= 1928 Pittsburgh Pirates season =

1928 Pittsburgh Pirates
- League: National League
- Ballpark: Forbes Field
- City: Pittsburgh, Pennsylvania
- Owners: Barney Dreyfuss
- Managers: Donie Bush

The 1928 Pittsburgh Pirates season was the 47th season in franchise history. The team scored the most runs in the National League. However, they also allowed the third most and slipped down to fourth place in the standings.

== Offseason ==
- December 3, 1927: Mike Cvengros and Ike Danning were traded by the Pirates to the Wichita Falls Spudders for Fred Fussell.

== Regular season ==
During the season, Burleigh Grimes became the last pitcher to win at least 25 games in one season for the Pirates in the 20th century.

=== Season standings ===
National League
Team	W	L	Pct.	GB	Home	Road
St. Louis Cardinals	95	59	.617	—	42‍–‍35	53‍–‍24
New York Giants	93	61	.604	2	51‍–‍26	42‍–‍35
Chicago Cubs	91	63	.591	4	52‍–‍25	39‍–‍38
Pittsburgh Pirates	85	67	.559	9	47‍–‍30	38‍–‍37
Cincinnati Reds	78	74	.513	16	44‍–‍33	34‍–‍41
Brooklyn Robins	77	76	.503	17½	41‍–‍35	36‍–‍41
Boston Braves	50	103	.327	44½	25‍–‍51	25‍–‍52
Philadelphia Phillies	43	109	.283	51	26‍–‍49	17‍–‍60

=== Record vs. opponents ===
1928 National League record Sources:
Team	BSN	BRO	CHC	CIN	NYG	PHI	PIT	STL
Boston	—	7–15	5–17	10–12	6–16	13–9	5–16	4–18
Brooklyn	15–7	—	10–12	10–12–1	9–13–1	15–7	9–12	9–13
Chicago	17–5	12–10	—	13–9	14–8	13–9	11–11	11–11
Cincinnati	12–10	12–10–1	9–13	—	8–14	13–7	12–10	12–10
New York	16–6	13–9–1	8–14	14–8	—	17–5	11–11	14–8
Philadelphia	9–13	7–15	9–13	7–13	5–17	—	4–18	2–20
Pittsburgh	16–5	12–9	11–11	10–12	11–11	18–4	—	7–15
St. Louis	18–4	13–9	11–11	10–12	8–14	20–2	15–7	—

=== Game log ===
1928 Game Log: 85–67 (Home: 47–30; Away: 38–37)
April: 6–8 (Home: 2–2; Away: 4–6)

#	Date	Opponent	Score	Win	Loss	Save	Attendance	Record
1	April 11	@ Cardinals	7–14	Haines	**Kremer** (0–1)	—	25,000	0–1
2	April 12	@ Cardinals	0–5	Alexander	**Grimes** (0–1)	—	—	0–2
3	April 14	@ Reds	0–5	Lucas	**Miljus** (0–1)	—	2,500	0–3
4	April 15	@ Reds	3–2	**Dawson** (1–0)	Luque	**Hill** (1)	—	1–3
5	April 16	@ Reds	8–1	**Grimes** (1–1)	Rixey	—	—	2–3
6	April 19	Cardinals	10–13	Littlejohn	**Miljus** (0–2)	Sherdel	30,000	2–4
7	April 20	Cardinals	2–6	Haines	**Grimes** (1–2)	—	—	2–5
8	April 22	@ Cubs	2–3	Jones	**Miljus** (0–3)	—	50,000	2–6
9	April 23	@ Cubs	6–0	**Kremer** (1–1)	Malone	—	—	3–6
10	April 24	@ Cubs	2–7	Blake	**Dawson** (1–1)	—	—	3–7
11	April 25	@ Cubs	10–0	**Grimes** (2–2)	Root	—	—	4–7
12	April 26	Reds	7–2	**Hill** (1–0)	Edwards	—	—	5–7
13	April 29	@ Reds	2–3	Rixey	**Kremer** (1–2)	—	—	5–8
14	April 30	Cubs	8–7	**Miljus** (1–3)	Malone	—	—	6–8

May: 12–16 (Home: 11–10; Away: 1–6)

#	Date	Opponent	Score	Win	Loss	Save	Attendance	Record
15	May 1	Cubs	4–1	**Hill** (2–0)	Bush	—	—	7–8
16	May 2	Cubs	9–8 (10)	**Dawson** (2–1)	Nehf	—	—	8–8
17	May 3	Braves	4–5 (11)	Brandt	**Kremer** (1–3)	—	—	8–9
18	May 4	Braves	13–3	**Grimes** (3–2)	Greenfield	—	—	9–9
19	May 5	Braves	6–2	**Dawson** (3–1)	Smith	**Miljus** (1)	—	10–9
20	May 7	Braves	9–4	**Miljus** (2–3)	Robertson	—	—	11–9
21	May 8	Giants	6–5	**Grimes** (4–2)	Henry	—	—	12–9
22	May 9	Giants	0–6	Barnes	**Dawson** (3–2)	—	—	12–10
23	May 10	Giants	4–5	Fitzsimmons	**Kremer** (1–4)	—	—	12–11
24	May 12	Robins	5–4	**Hill** (3–0)	McWeeny	—	10,000	13–11
25	May 13	@ Robins	5–8	Clark	**Grimes** (4–3)	—	22,000	13–12
26	May 14	Robins	6–7	Doak	**Brame** (0–1)	Vance	—	13–13
27	May 15	Robins	3–10	McWeeny	**Miljus** (2–4)	—	—	13–14
28	May 18	Phillies	6–4	**Kremer** (2–4)	Miller	**Grimes** (1)	—	14–14
29	May 19	Phillies	3–1	**Hill** (4–0)	Benge	—	—	15–14
30	May 20	@ Reds	2–3	Lucas	**Grimes** (4–4)	—	—	15–15
31	May 21	@ Reds	3–4	Rixey	**Dawson** (3–3)	—	—	15–16
32	May 21	@ Reds	6–3	**Fussell** (1–0)	May	—	—	16–16
33	May 22	@ Reds	4–5	Mays	**Kremer** (2–5)	—	—	16–17
34	May 23	@ Reds	3–4 (10)	Luque	**Hill** (4–1)	—	—	16–18
35	May 24	Cubs	6–2	**Grimes** (5–4)	Nehf	—	—	17–18
36	May 25	Cubs	3–10	Root	**Fussell** (1–1)	—	—	17–19
37	May 26	Cubs	1–6	Malone	**Kremer** (2–6)	—	—	17–20
38	May 27	@ Cubs	0–3	Blake	**Hill** (4–2)	—	35,000	17–21
39	May 29	Cardinals	1–7	Rhem	**Grimes** (5–5)	—	—	17–22
40	May 30	Cardinals	1–10	Sherdel	**Miljus** (2–5)	—	—	17–23
41	May 30	Cardinals	3–4	Johnson	**Kremer** (2–7)	Haid	—	17–24
42	May 31	Cardinals	3–2	**Hill** (5–2)	Haines	—	—	18–24

June: 13–11 (Home: 4–2; Away: 9–9)

#	Date	Opponent	Score	Win	Loss	Save	Attendance	Record
43	June 1	Cubs	10–4	**Grimes** (6–5)	Blake	—	—	19–24
44	June 2	Cubs	6–10	Weinert	**Dawson** (3–4)	Root	—	19–25
45	June 3	@ Robins	9–7 (14)	**Grimes** (7–5)	Petty	—	25,000	20–25
46	June 7	@ Braves	8–6 (12)	**Burwell** (1–0)	Smith	—	—	21–25
47	June 8	@ Braves	5–9	Brandt	**Kremer** (2–8)	—	—	21–26
48	June 9	@ Braves	6–2	**Grimes** (8–5)	Genewich	—	—	22–26
49	June 9	@ Braves	6–3	**Miljus** (3–5)	Robertson	—	—	23–26
50	June 11	@ Phillies	4–6	Ring	**Hill** (5–3)	Sweetland	—	23–27
51	June 12	@ Phillies	15–4	**Kremer** (3–8)	Miller	—	—	24–27
52	June 13	@ Phillies	3–4	Sweetland	**Grimes** (8–6)	—	—	24–28
53	June 14	@ Giants	4–3 (11)	**Miljus** (4–5)	Fitzsimmons	—	—	25–28
54	June 15	@ Giants	1–9	Aldridge	**Hill** (5–4)	—	9,000	25–29
55	June 16	@ Giants	0–4	Benton	**Kremer** (3–9)	—	—	25–30
56	June 17	@ Giants	6–0	**Grimes** (9–6)	Henry	—	—	26–30
57	June 20	Reds	2–1	**Kremer** (4–9)	Rixey	—	—	27–30
58	June 21	Reds	4–5	Appleton	**Fussell** (1–2)	—	—	27–31
59	June 22	Reds	11–1	**Grimes** (10–6)	Kolp	—	—	28–31
60	June 23	Reds	6–5 (10)	**Miljus** (5–5)	Kolp	—	—	29–31
61	June 24	@ Cubs	1–8	Nehf	**Kremer** (4–10)	—	15,000	29–32
62	June 26	@ Cubs	1–0	**Grimes** (11–6)	Blake	—	—	30–32
63	June 26	@ Cubs	3–7	Bush	**Miljus** (5–6)	Malone	—	30–33
64	June 28	@ Cardinals	3–4	Sherdel	**Hill** (5–5)	—	—	30–34
65	June 29	@ Cardinals	4–9	Mitchell	**Kremer** (4–11)	—	—	30–35
66	June 30	@ Cardinals	4–3	**Grimes** (12–6)	Alexander	—	—	31–35

July: 17–12 (Home: 11–6; Away: 6–6)

#	Date	Opponent	Score	Win	Loss	Save	Attendance	Record
67	July 1	@ Cardinals	2–0	**Fussell** (2–2)	Haines	—	—	32–35
68	July 1	@ Cardinals	6–8	Johnson	**Miljus** (5–7)	Haid	—	32–36
69	July 3	Reds	7–9	Edwards	**Grimes** (12–7)	—	—	32–37
70	July 4	Reds	0–6	Rixey	**Dawson** (3–5)	—	—	32–38
71	July 4	Reds	3–11	Kolp	**Grimes** (12–8)	—	—	32–39
72	July 6	Giants	7–11	Faulkner	**Fussell** (2–3)	—	—	32–40
73	July 7	Giants	8–6	**Fussell** (3–3)	Benton	—	—	33–40
74	July 7	Giants	5–2	**Brame** (1–1)	Fitzsimmons	—	—	34–40
75	July 9	Giants	5–3	**Grimes** (13–8)	Faulkner	—	—	35–40
76	July 10	Phillies	6–5	**Kremer** (5–11)	Ring	—	—	36–40
77	July 11	Phillies	3–1 (6)	**Brame** (2–1)	Benge	**Hill** (2)	—	37–40
78	July 14	Braves	10–0	**Grimes** (14–8)	Brandt	—	—	38–40
79	July 16	Braves	8–3	**Kremer** (6–11)	Delaney	—	—	39–40
80	July 17	Braves	7–6	**Hill** (6–5)	Smith	**Fussell** (1)	—	40–40
81	July 18	Braves	16–3	**Grimes** (15–8)	Barnes	—	—	41–40
82	July 19	Robins	0–3	McWeeny	**Fussell** (3–4)	—	—	41–41
83	July 20	Robins	7–8	Elliott	**Kremer** (6–12)	Clark	4,000	41–42
84	July 21	Robins	7–3	**Hill** (7–5)	Ehrhardt	—	—	42–42
85	July 21	Robins	10–2	**Meadows** (1–0)	Petty	—	15,000	43–42
86	July 22	@ Robins	0–5	Vance	**Grimes** (15–9)	—	—	43–43
87	July 22	@ Robins	6–5	**Kremer** (7–12)	Clark	—	29,000	44–43
88	July 23	@ Robins	2–1	**Fussell** (4–4)	McWeeny	—	—	45–43
89	July 24	@ Giants	3–6	Benton	**Dawson** (3–6)	—	—	45–44
90	July 25	@ Giants	5–6	Walker	**Hill** (7–6)	Genewich	—	45–45
91	July 26	@ Giants	7–5	**Grimes** (16–9)	Hubbell	—	—	46–45
92	July 27	@ Giants	2–4	Fitzsimmons	**Fussell** (4–5)	—	—	46–46
93	July 30	@ Braves	2–1	**Kremer** (8–12)	Brandt	—	—	47–46
94	July 30	@ Braves	6–5 (10)	**Grimes** (17–9)	Barnes	—	—	48–46
95	July 31	@ Braves	5–11	Smith	**Meadows** (1–1)	—	—	48–47

August: 23–9 (Home: 15–8; Away: 8–1)

#	Date	Opponent	Score	Win	Loss	Save	Attendance	Record
96	August 2	@ Phillies	18–4	**Grimes** (18–9)	Miller	**Dawson** (1)	—	49–47
97	August 3	@ Phillies	14–6	**Fussell** (5–5)	Sweetland	**Tauscher** (1)	—	50–47
98	August 4	@ Phillies	14–8	**Grimes** (19–9)	Benge	—	—	51–47
99	August 4	@ Phillies	11–4	**Hill** (8–6)	Ring	**Dawson** (2)	—	52–47
100	August 7	@ Robins	4–3	**Grimes** (20–9)	McWeeny	—	—	53–47
101	August 7	@ Robins	3–2 (12)	**Hill** (9–6)	Elliott	—	6,500	54–47
102	August 8	@ Robins	4–3	**Kremer** (9–12)	McWeeny	—	2,500	55–47
103	August 9	Cardinals	5–4	**Hill** (10–6)	Haines	**Grimes** (2)	—	56–47
104	August 10	Cardinals	1–2 (12)	Mitchell	**Fussell** (5–6)	Sherdel	—	56–48
105	August 11	Reds	0–1	Lucas	**Grimes** (20–10)	—	—	56–49
106	August 13	Robins	6–1	**Kremer** (10–12)	Doak	—	—	57–49
107	August 14	Robins	4–2	**Hill** (11–6)	McWeeny	—	—	58–49
108	August 15	Robins	5–6	Vance	**Fussell** (5–7)	Petty	—	58–50
109	August 16	Robins	11–6	**Grimes** (21–10)	Doak	—	—	59–50
110	August 17	Phillies	10–3	**Kremer** (11–12)	Willoughby	—	—	60–50
111	August 17	Phillies	9–1	**Brame** (3–1)	Sweetland	—	—	61–50
112	August 18	Phillies	9–0	**Hill** (12–6)	Benge	—	—	62–50
113	August 18	Phillies	8–11	Ring	**Fussell** (5–8)	Ferguson	—	62–51
114	August 20	Braves	11–14	Smith	**Grimes** (21–11)	Delaney	—	62–52
115	August 21	Braves	6–2	**Kremer** (12–12)	Brandt	—	—	63–52
116	August 22	Braves	10–3	**Brame** (4–1)	Greenfield	—	—	64–52
117	August 23	Giants	3–6	Benton	**Hill** (12–7)	Scott	35,000	64–53
118	August 23	Giants	13–3	**Fussell** (6–8)	Hubbell	—	30,000	65–53
119	August 24	Giants	16–5	**Grimes** (22–11)	Genewich	—	—	66–53
120	August 25	Giants	7–1	**Kremer** (13–12)	Fitzsimmons	—	—	67–53
121	August 26	@ Reds	3–4	Lucas	**Brame** (4–2)	—	—	67–54
122	August 27	@ Reds	9–4	**Fussell** (7–8)	Luque	—	—	68–54
123	August 28	Phillies	9–2	**Hill** (13–7)	Sweetland	—	—	69–54
124	August 28	Phillies	16–7	**Dawson** (4–6)	Benge	—	—	70–54
125	August 29	Phillies	0–4 (7)	Willoughby	**Brame** (4–3)	—	—	70–55
126	August 31	Cardinals	6–5	**Kremer** (14–12)	Alexander	**Grimes** (3)	—	71–55
127	August 31	Cardinals	2–6	Haines	**Fussell** (7–9)	—	—	71–56

September: 14–11 (Home: 4–2; Away: 10–9)

#	Date	Opponent	Score	Win	Loss	Save	Attendance	Record
128	September 1	Cardinals	1–4	Sherdel	**Hill** (13–8)	—	—	71–57
129	September 2	@ Cubs	2–3	Malone	**Grimes** (22–12)	—	32,000	71–58
130	September 3	Cubs	16–1	**Brame** (5–3)	Root	—	—	72–58
131	September 3	Cubs	6–3	**Kremer** (15–12)	Carlson	—	—	73–58
132	September 4	Cubs	8–9	Blake	**Hill** (13–9)	—	—	73–59
133	September 6	@ Cardinals	3–4 (10)	Mitchell	**Grimes** (22–13)	—	10,000	73–60
134	September 7	@ Cardinals	3–6	Haines	**Kremer** (15–13)	—	—	73–61
135	September 8	@ Cardinals	4–2	**Hill** (14–9)	Sherdel	—	—	74–61
136	September 9	@ Cardinals	8–7	**Dawson** (5–6)	Reinhart	—	—	75–61
137	September 10	@ Cubs	7–5	**Grimes** (23–13)	Nehf	—	—	76–61
138	September 11	@ Cubs	3–9	Malone	**Hill** (14–10)	—	—	76–62
139	September 14	Reds	4–1	**Grimes** (24–13)	Rixey	—	—	77–62
140	September 15	Reds	6–1	**Hill** (15–10)	Ash	—	—	78–62
141	September 16	@ Giants	1–0	**Fussell** (8–9)	Benton	—	50,000	79–62
142	September 17	@ Giants	2–9	Hubbell	**Brame** (5–4)	—	3,000	79–63
143	September 18	@ Giants	2–3 (10)	Fitzsimmons	**Dawson** (5–7)	—	—	79–64
144	September 20	@ Phillies	6–4	**Hill** (16–10)	Willoughby	—	—	80–64
145	September 21	@ Phillies	6–5	**Dawson** (6–7)	Sweetland	—	—	81–64
146	September 22	@ Phillies	9–7	**Grimes** (25–13)	McGraw	—	—	82–64
147	September 22	@ Phillies	5–3	**Brame** (6–4)	Caldwell	—	—	83–64
148	September 24	@ Braves	3–1 (10)	**Dawson** (7–7)	Delaney	—	—	84–64
149	September 24	@ Braves	2–4	Smith	**Blankenship** (0–1)	—	—	84–65
150	September 25	@ Braves	13–8	**Brame** (7–4)	Greenfield	**Dawson** (3)	—	85–65
151	September 27	@ Robins	6–7 (10)	Petty	**Grimes** (25–14)	—	—	85–66
152	September 27	@ Robins	1–8	Koupal	**Blankenship** (0–2)	—	—	85–67

Legend: = Win = Loss
Bold = Pirates team member

=== Roster ===
1928 Pittsburgh Pirates
**Roster**
**Pitchers**: Les Bartholomew; Homer Blankenship; Erv Brame; Bill Burwell; Joe Dawson; Fred Fussell; Burleigh Grimes; Carmen Hill; Ray Kremer; Lee Meadows; Johnny Miljus; Glenn Spencer; Walt Tauscher; Elmer Tutwiler	**Catchers**: Johnny Gooch; Charlie Hargreaves; Rollie Hemsley; John O'Connell; Earl Smith; **Infielders**: Sparky Adams; Dick Bartell; George Grantham; Joe Harris; Mack Hillis; Cobe Jones; Eddie Mulligan; Pie Traynor; Bill Windle; Glenn Wright	**Outfielders**: Clyde Barnhart; Fred Brickell; Adam Comorosky; Pete Scott; Lloyd Waner; Paul Waner	**Manager**: Donie Bush

== Player stats ==
=== Batting ===
==== Starters by position ====
Note: Pos = Position; G = Games played; AB = At bats; H = Hits; Avg. = Batting average; HR = Home runs; RBI = Runs batted in

Pos	Player	G	AB	H	Avg.	HR	RBI
C	Charlie Hargreaves	79	260	74	.285	1	32
1B	George Grantham	124	440	142	.323	10	85
2B	Sparky Adams	135	539	149	.276	0	38
SS	Glenn Wright	108	407	126	.310	8	66
3B	Pie Traynor	144	569	192	.337	3	124
OF	Lloyd Waner	152	659	221	.335	5	61
OF	Paul Waner	152	602	223	.370	6	86
OF	Fred Brickell	81	202	65	.322	3	41

==== Other batters ====
Note: G = Games played; AB = At bats; H = Hits; Avg. = Batting average; HR = Home runs; RBI = Runs batted in

Player	G	AB	H	Avg.	HR	RBI
Dick Bartell	72	233	71	.305	1	36
Fred Brickell	81	202	65	.322	3	41
Clyde Barnhart	61	196	58	.296	4	30
Pete Scott	60	177	55	.311	5	33
Rollie Hemsley	50	133	36	.271	0	18
Earl Smith	32	85	21	.247	2	11
Johnny Gooch	31	80	19	.238	0	5
Eddie Mulligan	27	43	10	.233	0	1
Mack Hillis	11	36	9	.250	1	7
Joe Harris	16	23	9	.391	0	2
Cobe Jones	1	2	1	.500	0	0
Bill Windle	1	1	1	1.000	0	0
John O'Connell	1	1	0	.000	0	0

=== Pitching ===
==== Starting pitchers ====
Note: G = Games pitched; IP = Innings pitched; W = Wins; L = Losses; ERA = Earned run average; SO = Strikeouts

Player	G	IP	W	L	ERA	SO
Burleigh Grimes	48	330.2	25	14	2.99	97
Carmen Hill	36	237.0	16	10	3.53	73
Ray Kremer	34	219.0	15	13	4.64	61
Fred Fussell	28	159.2	8	9	3.61	43

==== Other pitchers ====
Note: G = Games pitched; IP = Innings pitched; W = Wins; L = Losses; ERA = Earned run average; SO = Strikeouts

Player	G	IP	W	L	ERA	SO
Joe Dawson	31	128.2	7	7	3.29	36
Erv Brame	24	95.2	7	4	5.08	22
Johnny Miljus	21	69.2	5	7	5.30	26
Homer Blankenship	5	21.2	0	1	5.82	6
Bill Burwell	4	20.2	1	0	5.23	2
Lee Meadows	4	10.0	1	1	8.10	3

==== Relief pitchers ====
Note: G = Games pitched; W = Wins; L = Losses; SV = Saves; ERA = Earned run average; SO = Strikeouts

Player	G	W	L	SV	ERA	SO
Walt Tauscher	17	0	0	1	4.91	7
Les Bartholomew	6	0	0	0	7.15	6
Glenn Spencer	4	0	0	0	1.59	2
Elmer Tutwiler	2	0	0	0	4.91	1

== League leaders ==
George Grantham

- #3 in NL in on-base percentage (.408)

Burleigh Grimes

- MLB leader in wins (25)
- #4 in NL in strikeouts (97)

Pie Traynor

- #2 in NL in RBI (124)

Lloyd Waner

- #3 in NL in runs scored (121)

Paul Waner

- NL leader in runs scored (142)
- #2 in NL in batting average (.370)
- #2 in NL in on-base percentage (.446)
