= 1928 Boston Braves season =

1928 Boston Braves
- League: National League
- Ballpark: Braves Field
- City: Boston, Massachusetts
- Record: 50–103 (.327)
- League place: 7th
- Owners: Emil Fuchs
- Managers: Jack Slattery, Rogers Hornsby
- Radio: WNAC (Fred Hoey)

The 1928 Boston Braves season was the 58th season of the franchise. The team finished seventh in the National League with a record of 50–103, 44½ games behind the St. Louis Cardinals.

In the offseason, Rogers Hornsby was traded to the Braves. It was the second trade in as many seasons for Hornsby, who had been traded to the New York Giants during the previous offseason. Hornsby managed to be the league's most productive hitter. He won his seventh batting title in 1928 with a .387 average, and led the league in on-base percentage (.498, a figure that only Hornsby himself topped among National Leaguers in the 20th century), slugging percentage (.632), and walks (107).

The Braves played 9 consecutive doubleheaders between September 4 and September 15, totaling 18 games in just 12 days.

== Offseason ==
- December 14, 1927: Frank Gibson was purchased from the Braves by the St. Louis Cardinals.
- January 10, 1928: Shanty Hogan and Jimmy Welsh were traded by the Braves to the New York Giants for Rogers Hornsby.

== Regular season ==
=== Season standings ===
National League
Team	W	L	Pct.	GB	Home	Road
St. Louis Cardinals	95	59	.617	—	42‍–‍35	53‍–‍24
New York Giants	93	61	.604	2	51‍–‍26	42‍–‍35
Chicago Cubs	91	63	.591	4	52‍–‍25	39‍–‍38
Pittsburgh Pirates	85	67	.559	9	47‍–‍30	38‍–‍37
Cincinnati Reds	78	74	.513	16	44‍–‍33	34‍–‍41
Brooklyn Robins	77	76	.503	17½	41‍–‍35	36‍–‍41
Boston Braves	50	103	.327	44½	25‍–‍51	25‍–‍52
Philadelphia Phillies	43	109	.283	51	26‍–‍49	17‍–‍60

=== Record vs. opponents ===
1928 National League record Sources:
Team	BSN	BRO	CHC	CIN	NYG	PHI	PIT	STL
Boston	—	7–15	5–17	10–12	6–16	13–9	5–16	4–18
Brooklyn	15–7	—	10–12	10–12–1	9–13–1	15–7	9–12	9–13
Chicago	17–5	12–10	—	13–9	14–8	13–9	11–11	11–11
Cincinnati	12–10	12–10–1	9–13	—	8–14	13–7	12–10	12–10
New York	16–6	13–9–1	8–14	14–8	—	17–5	11–11	14–8
Philadelphia	9–13	7–15	9–13	7–13	5–17	—	4–18	2–20
Pittsburgh	16–5	12–9	11–11	10–12	11–11	18–4	—	7–15
St. Louis	18–4	13–9	11–11	10–12	8–14	20–2	15–7	—

=== Notable transactions ===
- August 14, 1928: Emilio Palmero was purchased by the Braves from the Toledo Mud Hens.

=== Roster ===
1928 Boston Braves
Roster
Pitchers: Virgil Barnes; Ray Boggs; Ed Brandt; Ben Cantwell; Bill Clarkson; Johnny Cooney; Art Delaney; Foster Edwards; Joe Genewich; Hal Goldsmith; Kent Greenfield; Bunny Hearn; Bonnie Hollingsworth; Art Mills; Guy Morrison; Emilio Palmero; Charlie Robertson; Bob Smith; Clay Touchstone; Johnny Werts	Catchers: Bill Cronin; Al Spohrer; Zack Taylor; Luke Urban; Earl Williams; Infielders: Les Bell; Dick Burrus; Jimmy Cooney; Doc Farrell; Howard Freigau; Doc Gautreau; Rogers Hornsby; George Sisler	Outfielders: Eddie Brown; Earl Clark; Dave Harris; Dinny McNamara; Eddie Moore; Heinie Mueller; Lance Richbourg; Jack Smith; Other batters: Charlie Fitzberger	Manager: Rogers Hornsby; Jack Slattery

== Player stats ==
= Indicates team leader

= Indicates league leader

=== Batting ===
==== Starters by position ====
Note: Pos = Position; G = Games played; AB = At bats; H = Hits; Avg. = Batting average; HR = Home runs; RBI = Runs batted in

Pos	Player	G	AB	H	Avg.	HR	RBI
C	Zack Taylor	125	399	100	.251	2	30
1B	George Sisler	118	491	167	.340	4	68
2B	Rogers Hornsby	140	486	188	.387	21	94
SS	Doc Farrell	134	483	104	.215	3	43
3B	Les Bell	153	591	164	.277	10	91
OF	Jack Smith	96	254	71	.280	1	32
OF	Eddie Brown	142	523	140	.268	2	59
OF	Lance Richbourg	148	612	206	.337	2	52

==== Other batters ====
Note: G = Games played; AB = At bats; H = Hits; Avg. = Batting average; HR = Home runs; RBI = Runs batted in

Player	G	AB	H	Avg.	HR	RBI
Eddie Moore	68	215	51	.237	2	18
Heinie Mueller	42	151	34	.225	0	19
Dick Burrus	64	137	37	.270	3	13
Al Spohrer	51	124	27	.218	0	9
Earl Clark	28	112	34	.304	0	10
Howard Freigau	52	109	28	.257	1	17
Jimmy Cooney	18	51	7	.137	0	3
Johnny Cooney	33	41	7	.171	0	2
Doc Gautreau	23	18	5	.278	0	1
Dave Harris	7	17	2	.118	0	0
Luke Urban	15	17	3	.176	0	2
Charlie Fitzberger	7	7	2	.286	0	0
Dinny McNamara	9	4	1	.250	0	0
Bill Cronin	3	2	0	.000	0	0
Earl Williams	3	2	0	.000	0	0

=== Pitching ===
==== Starting pitchers ====
Note: G = Games pitched; IP = Innings pitched; W = Wins; L = Losses; ERA = Earned run average; SO = Strikeouts

Player	G	IP	W	L	ERA	SO
Bob Smith	38	244.1	13	17	3.87	59
Ed Brandt	38	225.1	9	21	5.07	84
Joe Genewich	13	80.2	3	7	4.13	15

==== Other pitchers ====
Note: G = Games pitched; IP = Innings pitched; W = Wins; L = Losses; ERA = Earned run average; SO = Strikeouts

Player	G	IP	W	L	ERA	SO
Art Delaney	39	192.1	9	17	3.79	45
Kent Greenfield	32	143.2	3	11	5.32	30
Ben Cantwell	22	90.0	3	3	5.10	18
Johnny Cooney	24	89.2	3	7	4.32	18
Virgil Barnes	16	60.1	2	7	5.82	7
Charlie Robertson	13	59.1	2	5	5.31	17
Bonnie Hollingsworth	7	22.1	0	2	5.24	10
Johnny Werts	10	18.1	0	2	10.31	5
Emilio Palmero	3	6.2	0	1	5.40	0

==== Relief pitchers ====
Note: G = Games pitched; W = Wins; L = Losses; SV = Saves; ERA = Earned run average; SO = Strikeouts

Player	G	W	L	SV	ERA	SO
Foster Edwards	21	2	1	0	5.66	17
Bill Clarkson	19	0	2	0	6.75	8
Bunny Hearn	7	1	0	0	6.30	8
Clay Touchstone	5	0	0	0	4.50	1
Hal Goldsmith	4	0	0	0	3.24	1
Art Mills	4	0	0	0	12.91	0
Ray Boggs	4	0	0	0	5.40	0
Guy Morrison	1	0	0	0	12.00	0
George Sisler	1	0	0	0	0.00	0

== Farm system ==
Level	Team	League	Manager
A	Providence Grays	Eastern League	King Bader
