= 1928 Philadelphia Phillies season =

American baseball team season

1928 Philadelphia Phillies
- League: National League
- Ballpark: Baker Bowl
- City: Philadelphia, Pennsylvania
- Owners: William F. Baker
- Managers: Burt Shotton

The 1928 Philadelphia Phillies season was a Franchise's 45th season in Major League Baseball. The Phillies finished eighth in the National League with a record of 43 wins and 109 losses.

== Regular season ==
=== Season standings ===
National League
Team	W	L	Pct.	GB	Home	Road
St. Louis Cardinals	95	59	.617	—	42‍–‍35	53‍–‍24
New York Giants	93	61	.604	2	51‍–‍26	42‍–‍35
Chicago Cubs	91	63	.591	4	52‍–‍25	39‍–‍38
Pittsburgh Pirates	85	67	.559	9	47‍–‍30	38‍–‍37
Cincinnati Reds	78	74	.513	16	44‍–‍33	34‍–‍41
Brooklyn Robins	77	76	.503	17½	41‍–‍35	36‍–‍41
Boston Braves	50	103	.327	44½	25‍–‍51	25‍–‍52
Philadelphia Phillies	43	109	.283	51	26‍–‍49	17‍–‍60

=== Record vs. opponents ===
1928 National League record Sources:
Team	BSN	BRO	CHC	CIN	NYG	PHI	PIT	STL
Boston	—	7–15	5–17	10–12	6–16	13–9	5–16	4–18
Brooklyn	15–7	—	10–12	10–12–1	9–13–1	15–7	9–12	9–13
Chicago	17–5	12–10	—	13–9	14–8	13–9	11–11	11–11
Cincinnati	12–10	12–10–1	9–13	—	8–14	13–7	12–10	12–10
New York	16–6	13–9–1	8–14	14–8	—	17–5	11–11	14–8
Philadelphia	9–13	7–15	9–13	7–13	5–17	—	4–18	2–20
Pittsburgh	16–5	12–9	11–11	10–12	11–11	18–4	—	7–15
St. Louis	18–4	13–9	11–11	10–12	8–14	20–2	15–7	—

=== Roster ===
1928 Philadelphia Phillies
Roster
Pitchers: Ed Baecht; Ray Benge; Earl Caldwell; Alex Ferguson; June Greene; Ed Lennon; Bob McGraw; Russ Miller; John Milligan; Clarence Mitchell; Hub Pruett; Jimmy Ring; Les Sweetland; Marty Walker; Augie Walsh; Claude Willoughby	Catchers: Spud Davis; Walt Lerian; Johnny Schulte; Jimmie Wilson; Infielders: Bernie Friberg; Don Hurst; Bill Kelly; Heinie Sand; Fresco Thompson; Pinky Whitney	Outfielders: Bill Deitrick; Art Jahn; Chuck Klein; Freddy Leach; Harvey MacDonald; Al Nixon; Denny Sothern; Cy Williams; Russ Wrightstone	Manager: Burt Shotton; Coaches: Fred Hunter

== Player stats ==
=== Batting ===
==== Starters by position ====
Note: Pos = Position; G = Games played; AB = At bats; H = Hits; Avg. = Batting average; HR = Home runs; RBI = Runs batted in

Pos	Player	G	AB	H	Avg.	HR	RBI
C	Walt Lerian	96	239	65	.272	2	25
1B	Don Hurst	107	396	113	.285	19	64
2B	Fresco Thompson	152	634	182	.287	3	50
SS	Heinie Sand	141	426	90	.211	0	38
3B	Pinky Whitney	151	585	176	.301	10	103
OF	Denny Sothern	141	579	165	.285	5	38
OF	Freddy Leach	145	588	179	.304	13	96
OF	Chuck Klein	64	253	91	.360	11	34

==== Other batters ====
Note: G = Games played; AB = At bats; H = Hits; Avg. = Batting average; HR = Home runs; RBI = Runs batted in

Player	G	AB	H	Avg.	HR	RBI
Cy Williams	99	238	61	.256	12	37
Spud Davis	67	163	46	.282	3	18
Johnny Schulte	65	113	28	.248	4	17
Bill Deitrick	52	100	20	.200	0	7
Bernie Friberg	52	94	19	.202	1	7
Art Jahn	36	94	21	.223	0	11
Russ Wrightstone	33	91	19	.209	1	11
Bill Kelly	23	71	12	.169	0	5
Jimmie Wilson	21	70	21	.300	0	13
Al Nixon	25	64	15	.234	0	7
Harvey MacDonald	13	16	4	.250	0	2

=== Pitching ===
==== Starting pitchers ====
Note: G = Games pitched; IP = Innings pitched; W = Wins; L = Losses; ERA = Earned run average; SO = Strikeouts

Player	G	IP	W	L	ERA	SO
Ray Benge	40	201.2	8	18	4.55	68
Jimmy Ring	35	176.0	4	17	6.44	70
Hub Pruett	13	71.1	2	4	4.54	35
Earl Caldwell	5	34.2	1	4	5.71	6
Marty Walker	1	0.0	0	1	inf	0

==== Other pitchers ====
Note: G = Games pitched; IP = Innings pitched; W = Wins; L = Losses; ERA = Earned run average; SO = Strikeouts

Player	G	IP	W	L	ERA	SO
Les Sweetland	37	135.1	3	15	6.58	23
Alex Ferguson	34	134.2	5	10	5.88	51
Claude Willoughby	35	130.2	6	5	5.30	26
Augie Walsh	38	122.1	4	9	6.18	38
Russ Miller	33	108.0	0	12	5.42	19
John Milligan	13	68.0	2	5	4.37	22

==== Relief pitchers ====
Note: G = Games pitched; W = Wins; L = Losses; SV = Saves; ERA = Earned run average; SO = Strikeouts

Player	G	W	L	SV	ERA	SO
Bob McGraw	39	7	8	1	5.18	28
Ed Baecht	9	1	1	0	6.00	10
Ed Lennon	5	0	0	0	8.76	6
Clarence Mitchell	3	0	0	0	9.53	0
June Greene	1	0	0	0	9.00	0
