= 1928 Brooklyn Robins season =

1928 Brooklyn Robins
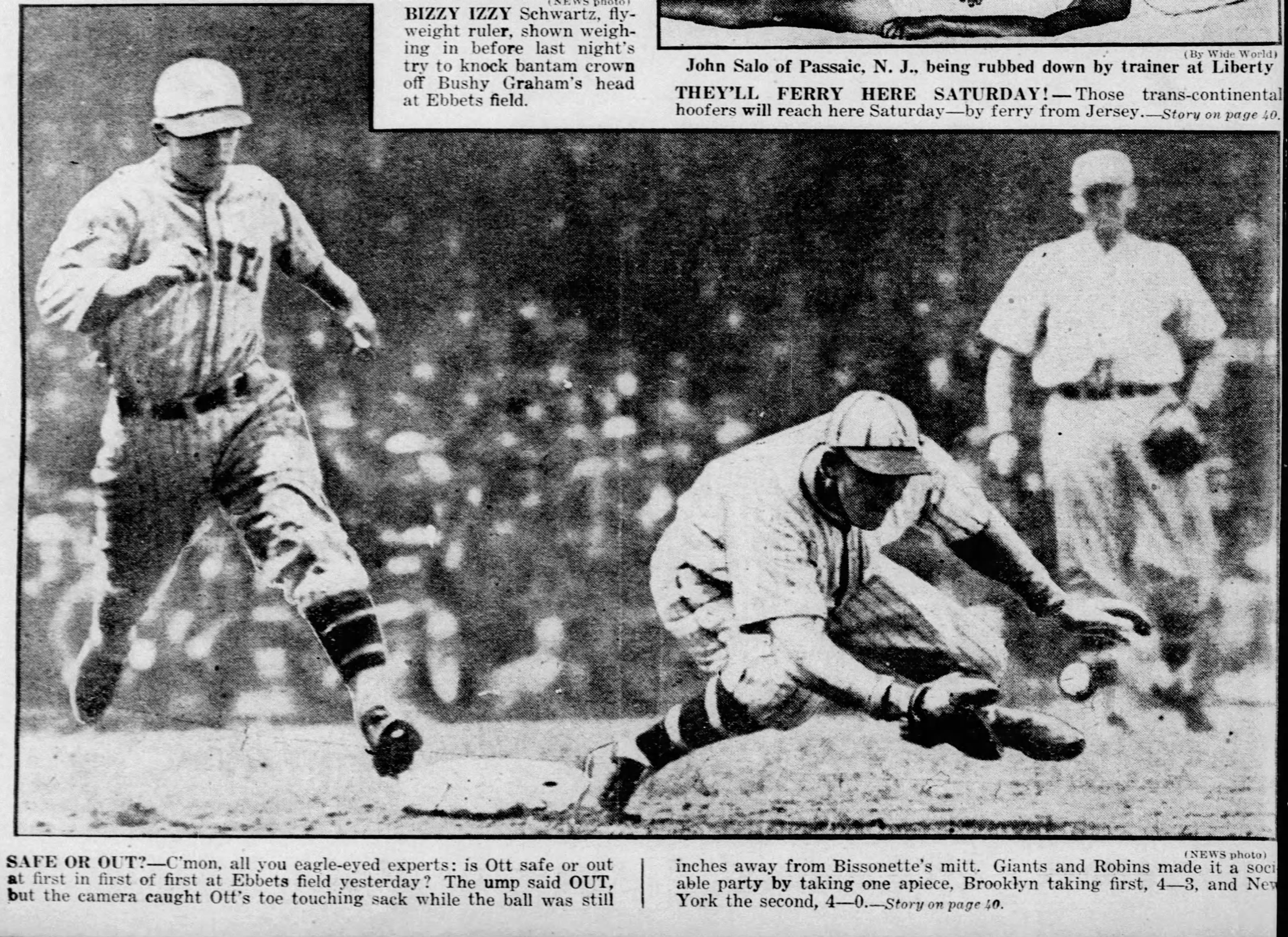
- Photograph from the May 23, 1928 doubleheader between the Brooklyn Robins and the New York Giants.
- League: National League
- Ballpark: Ebbets Field
- City: Brooklyn, New York
- Record: 77–76 (.503)
- League place: 6th
- Owners: Stephen McKeever, Brooklyn Trust Company
- President: Wilbert Robinson
- Managers: Wilbert Robinson

The 1928 Brooklyn Robins finished in sixth place, despite pitcher Dazzy Vance leading the league in strikeouts for a seventh straight season as well as posting a career best 2.09 ERA.

== Offseason ==
- December 12, 1928: Johnny Butler was purchased from the Robins by the Chicago Cubs.

== Regular season ==
=== Season standings ===
National League
Team	W	L	Pct.	GB	Home	Road
St. Louis Cardinals	95	59	.617	—	42‍–‍35	53‍–‍24
New York Giants	93	61	.604	2	51‍–‍26	42‍–‍35
Chicago Cubs	91	63	.591	4	52‍–‍25	39‍–‍38
Pittsburgh Pirates	85	67	.559	9	47‍–‍30	38‍–‍37
Cincinnati Reds	78	74	.513	16	44‍–‍33	34‍–‍41
Brooklyn Robins	77	76	.503	17½	41‍–‍35	36‍–‍41
Boston Braves	50	103	.327	44½	25‍–‍51	25‍–‍52
Philadelphia Phillies	43	109	.283	51	26‍–‍49	17‍–‍60

=== Record vs. opponents ===
1928 National League record Sources:
Team	BSN	BRO	CHC	CIN	NYG	PHI	PIT	STL
Boston	—	7–15	5–17	10–12	6–16	13–9	5–16	4–18
Brooklyn	15–7	—	10–12	10–12–1	9–13–1	15–7	9–12	9–13
Chicago	17–5	12–10	—	13–9	14–8	13–9	11–11	11–11
Cincinnati	12–10	12–10–1	9–13	—	8–14	13–7	12–10	12–10
New York	16–6	13–9–1	8–14	14–8	—	17–5	11–11	14–8
Philadelphia	9–13	7–15	9–13	7–13	5–17	—	4–18	2–20
Pittsburgh	16–5	12–9	11–11	10–12	11–11	18–4	—	7–15
St. Louis	18–4	13–9	11–11	10–12	8–14	20–2	15–7	—

=== Notable transactions ===
- June 8, 1928: Charlie Hargreaves was traded by the Robins to the Pittsburgh Pirates for Joe Harris and Johnny Gooch.
- June 23, 1928: Howard Freigau was purchased from the Robins by the Boston Braves.

=== Roster ===
1928 Brooklyn Robins
Roster
Pitchers: Watty Clark; Bill Doak; Rube Ehrhardt; Jumbo Elliott; Lou Koupal; Doug McWeeny; Ray Moss; Jesse Petty; Dazzy Vance	Catchers: Hank DeBerry; Johnny Gooch; Charlie Hargreaves; Butch Henline; Al López; Infielders: Dave Bancroft; Del Bissonette; Jake Flowers; Howard Freigau; Wally Gilbert; Harvey Hendrick; Jay Partridge; Harry Riconda	Outfielders: Rube Bressler; Max Carey; Joe Harris; Babe Herman; Jigger Statz; Ty Tyson; Overton Tremper; Max West	Manager: Wilbert Robinson; Coaches: Otto Miller

== Player stats ==
=== Batting ===
==== Starters by position ====
Note: Pos = Position; G = Games played; AB = At bats; R = Runs; H = Hits; Avg. = Batting average; HR = Home runs; RBI = Runs batted in; SB = Stolen bases

Pos	Player	G	AB	R	H	Avg.	HR	RBI	SB
C	Hank DeBerry	82	258	19	65	.252	0	23	3
1B	Del Bissonette	155	587	90	188	.320	25	106	5
2B	Jake Flowers	103	339	51	93	.274	2	44	10
3B	Harvey Hendrick	126	425	83	135	.318	11	59	16
SS	Dave Bancroft	149	515	47	127	.247	0	51	7
OF	Babe Herman	134	486	64	165	.340	12	91	1
OF	Rube Bressler	145	501	78	148	.295	4	70	2
OF	Max Carey	108	296	41	73	.247	2	19	18

==== Other batters ====
Note: G = Games played; AB = At bats; R = Runs; H = Hits; Avg. = Batting average; HR = Home runs; RBI = Runs batted in; SB = Stolen bases

Player	G	AB	R	H	Avg.	HR	RBI	SB
Harry Riconda	92	281	22	63	.224	3	35	6
Ty Tyson	59	210	25	57	.271	1	21	3
Jigger Statz	77	171	28	40	.234	0	16	3
Wally Gilbert	39	153	26	31	.203	0	3	2
Butch Henline	55	132	12	28	.212	2	8	2
Johnny Gooch	42	101	9	32	.317	0	12	0
Joe Harris	55	89	8	21	.236	1	8	0
Jay Partridge	37	73	18	18	.247	0	12	2
Charlie Hargreaves	20	61	3	12	.197	0	5	1
Howard Freigau	17	34	6	7	.206	0	3	0
Overton Tremper	10	31	1	6	.194	0	1	0
Max West	7	21	4	6	.286	0	1	0
Al López	3	12	0	0	.000	0	0	0

=== Pitching ===
==== Starting pitchers ====
Note: G = Games pitched; GS = Games started; CG = Complete games; IP = Innings pitched; W = Wins; L = Losses; ERA = Earned run average; BB = Bases on balls; SO = Strikeouts

Player	G	GS	CG	IP	W	L	ERA	BB	SO
Dazzy Vance	38	32	24	280.1	22	10	2.09	72	200
Doug McWeeny	42	32	12	244.0	14	14	3.17	114	79
Jesse Petty	40	31	15	234.0	15	15	4.04	56	74

==== Other pitchers ====
Note: G = Games pitched; GS = Games started; CG = Complete games; IP = Innings pitched; W = Wins; L = Losses; ERA = Earned run average; BB = Bases on balls; SO = Strikeouts

Player	G	GS	CG	IP	W	L	ERA	BB	SO
Watty Clark	40	19	10	194.2	12	9	2.68	50	85
Jumbo Elliott	41	21	7	192.0	9	14	3.89	64	74
Bill Doak	28	12	4	99.1	3	8	3.26	35	12
Ray Moss	22	5	1	60.1	0	3	4.92	35	5

==== Relief pitchers ====
Note: G = Games pitched; IP = Innings pitched; W = Wins; L = Losses; SV = Saves; ERA = Earned run average; BB = Bases on balls; SO = Strikeouts

Player	G	IP	W	L	SV	ERA	BB	SO
Rube Ehrhardt	28	54.0	1	3	2	4.67	27	12
Lou Koupal	17	37.1	1	0	1	2.41	15	10

== Awards and honors ==
=== League top five finishers ===
Del Bissonette

- #4 in NL in home runs (25)

Watty Clark

- #4 in NL in ERA (2.68)

Dazzy Vance

- MLB leader in ERA (2.09)
- MLB leader in strikeouts (200)
- #3 in NL in wins (22)
