= Sparky Adams =

American baseball player (1894–1989)

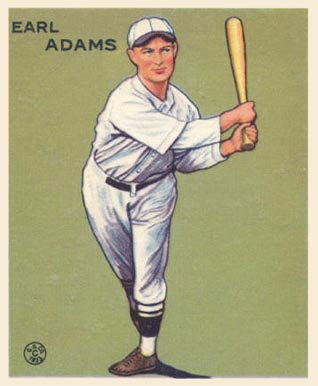
- Infielder
- Born: August 26, 1894; Zerbe Township, Pennsylvania, U.S.
- Died: February 24, 1989 (aged 94); Pottsville, Pennsylvania, U.S.
- Batted: Right Threw: Right

MLB debut
- September 18, 1922, for the Chicago Cubs

Last MLB appearance
- September 30, 1934, for the Cincinnati Reds

MLB statistics
- Batting average: .286
- Hits: 1,588
- Home runs: 9
- Runs batted in: 394
- Stats at Baseball Reference

Teams
- Chicago Cubs (1922–1927); Pittsburgh Pirates (1928–1929); St. Louis Cardinals (1930–1933); Cincinnati Reds (1933–1934)

Career highlights and awards
- World Series champion (1931)

Earl John "Sparky" Adams (August 26, 1894 – February 24, 1989) was an American professional Major League Baseball player who played with the Chicago Cubs, Pittsburgh Pirates, St. Louis Cardinals, and Cincinnati Reds. At five feet four and a half inches (1.638 m), Adams was the smallest Major League player during his career.

== Career ==
=== Chicago Cubs ===
Adams made his Major League debut with the Cubs on September 18, 1922. He played 11 games during the 1922 season. He spent the following two seasons as the team's shortstop, splitting time at the position with Charlie Hollocher. In the 1923 season, he hit four home runs in 311 at-bats for the season, then went on to hit only five the following 5,246 at-bats of his career. The 1925 season became his breakthrough, as he became a second baseman as a result of a trade that sent George Grantham to Pittsburgh, leaving the second base position open. As a hitter, he finished the season with 26 stolen bases, eight triples, and 627 at-bats, which led the National League. As a fielder, he led all second basemen in putouts, assists, and fielding average for the season.

In 1926, Adams increased his batting average to .309, and stole a career-high 27 bases, second-best in the National League. He also played all 154 games of the season, finished first in at-bats for the second year in a row with 624, and finished first in plate appearances with 700. The 1927 season saw Adams being used mainly as a utility infielder, although he started nearly every game. He played 60 games at second base, 53 at third base, and 40 at shortstop. He led the league in at-bats for the third year in a row with 647, and stole 26 bases for the third year in a row.

=== Pittsburgh Pirates ===
The 1927 season marked the end of Adams' time in Chicago. On November 28, 1927, Adams was traded, along with Pete Scott, to the Pittsburgh Pirates for Kiki Cuyler. Manager Joe McCarthy was criticized for the move, as the Cubs has plenty of outfield strength, but lacked a solid infield presence. It was also considered a good move for Pittsburgh, with sportswriters picking the Pirates to finish first the National League in 1928. He was given the starting second baseman job for the 1928 season. Adams took the place of George Grantham, so was moved to first base, the second time that Adams forced Grantham to another infield position. However, his batting average began to decline, and by the 1929 season, Adams was being used as a utility infielder. At the end of the season, the St. Louis Cardinals purchased his contract from the Pirates after two seasons of playing in Pittsburgh.

=== St. Louis Cardinals ===
As the 1930 season began, Adams was given the starting third baseman job. He went on to have a career high batting average of .314, and hit a career high nine triples. Adams played all six games in the 1930 World Series, hitting .143 as the Cardinals ended up losing the series. That season, every Cardinals player with over 300 at-bats had a batting average over .300, the only time in history this has happened. The 1931 season ended up being a career year for Adams. He was first in the league in doubles with 46, and had over 600 at-bats for the fourth season. Adams also placed in MVP voting, finishing ninth with 18 votes. He played 143 games over the season; however, an injury in September caused him to miss postseason time. Adams was injured on September 20 when, after winning a bunting and running contest before the game, he sprained his ankle while taking part in the baserunning challenge. He played two games as the Cardinals won the 1931 World Series. Adams was the last surviving member of the 1931 World Champion Cardinals. The following season, he only played 31 games due to injury.

=== Cincinnati Reds ===
On May 7, 1933, Adams was traded along with Paul Derringer and Allyn Stout to the Cincinnati Reds for Leo Durocher, Dutch Henry, and Jack Ogden, after playing only eight games for the Cardinals that season. He became the starting leadoff man during the 1933 season, as he had been for the other teams he played for. During the 1934 season, as primarily a backup to Mark Koenig, Adams was used as the backup second baseman and third baseman. At the end of the season, Adams was released, then retired at the end of the 1935 season.

After his retirement, he became a farmer and a service station operator in Tremont, Pennsylvania.

When he died in Pottsville, Pennsylvania on February 24, 1989, he was the last remaining player of the St. Louis Cardinals in the 1931 World Series.

== Career statistics ==
In 1,424 games over 13 seasons, Adams posted a .286 batting average (1,588-for-5,557) with 844 runs, 249 doubles, 48 triples, 9 home runs, 394 RBI, 154 stolen bases, 453 bases on balls, .343 on-base percentage and .353 slugging percentage. He finished his career with a .963 fielding percentage playing at second base, third base, shortstop and several games in the outfield. In the 1930 and '31 World Series, he was unproductive, hitting only .160 (4-for-25) with only one RBI.

== See also ==
- List of Major League Baseball annual doubles leaders
- List of Major League Baseball career stolen bases leaders
