= 1928 Cincinnati Reds season =

1928 Cincinnati Reds
- League: National League
- Ballpark: Redland Field
- City: Cincinnati
- Owners: C. J. McDiarmid
- Managers: Jack Hendricks

The 1928 Cincinnati Reds season was a season in American baseball. The team finished fifth in the National League with a record of 78–74, 16 games behind the St. Louis Cardinals.

== Off-season ==
On March 13, the Reds lost outfielder Rube Bressler, as he was selected by the Brooklyn Robins off waivers.

== Regular season ==
Cincinnati had a very solid start to the season, winning 19 of their first 30 games, and was leading the National League by one game over the second place Chicago Cubs. The Reds continued to play excellent baseball, and following a 20–12 victory over the Boston Braves on June 2, the team had increased their lead for the pennant to 3.5 games with a 32–17 record.

Throughout the remainder of June, the club struggled, winning only seven of their next 23 games, quickly falling to fifth place in the league. At the end of June, Cincinnati had a 39–33 record and was seven games behind the first place St. Louis Cardinals. In July, the Reds won eight of their first nine games to climb back into the pennant race, as they were in second place, cutting the Cardinals lead to 4.5 games. Cincinnati remained hot throughout the month, and by the end of July, the team remained in second place, but they could not close the gap on St. Louis, as they were five games behind.

The Reds struggled to a poor 11–14 record in August, falling back into fifth place by the end of the month, with a record of 70–56, seven games out of first place. The struggles continued into September, as Cincinnati finished the season in fifth place with a 78–74 record, 16 games behind the Cardinals.

The Reds 78 victories represented an increase of three from the previous season, and the club finished over .500 for the 10th time over the past 12 seasons. Attendance improved to 490,490 for the season, an increase of nearly 50,000 from the 1927 season.

Outfielder Ethan Allen led the Reds in batting average, as he hit .305 with a home run and 62 RBI in 129 games. Catcher Val Picinich led the club in home runs, as he hit seven, while batting .302 in 96 games. Outfielder Curt Walker batted .279 with six home runs and a team best 73 RBI and 19 stolen bases. Second baseman Hughie Critz led Cincinnati with 95 runs scored, as he finished the season with a .296 batting average with five home runs and 52 RBI, while adding 18 stolen bases. As a team, the Reds stole an NL high 83 bases.

Eppa Rixey led the Reds pitching staff, as he finished the season with a 19–18 record with a 3.43 ERA in 43 games. Rixey led the Reds with 291.1 innings pitched and 17 complete games. Ray Kolp had the best ERA on the club at 3.13, as he finished the season with a 13–10 record in 44 games. Red Lucas had a solid season, going 13–9 with a 3.39 ERA in 27 games. Dolf Luque led the team with 72 strikeouts, while earning a record of 11–10 with a 3.57 ERA in 33 games.

=== Season standings ===
National League
| Team | W | L | Pct. | GB | Home | Road |
|---|---|---|---|---|---|---|
| St. Louis Cardinals | 95 | 59 | .617 | — | 42‍–‍35 | 53‍–‍24 |
| New York Giants | 93 | 61 | .604 | 2 | 51‍–‍26 | 42‍–‍35 |
| Chicago Cubs | 91 | 63 | .591 | 4 | 52‍–‍25 | 39‍–‍38 |
| Pittsburgh Pirates | 85 | 67 | .559 | 9 | 47‍–‍30 | 38‍–‍37 |
| Cincinnati Reds | 78 | 74 | .513 | 16 | 44‍–‍33 | 34‍–‍41 |
| Brooklyn Robins | 77 | 76 | .503 | 17½ | 41‍–‍35 | 36‍–‍41 |
| Boston Braves | 50 | 103 | .327 | 44½ | 25‍–‍51 | 25‍–‍52 |
| Philadelphia Phillies | 43 | 109 | .283 | 51 | 26‍–‍49 | 17‍–‍60 |

=== Record vs. opponents ===
1928 National League record Sources:
| Team | BSN | BRO | CHC | CIN | NYG | PHI | PIT | STL |
|---|---|---|---|---|---|---|---|---|
| Boston | — | 7–15 | 5–17 | 10–12 | 6–16 | 13–9 | 5–16 | 4–18 |
| Brooklyn | 15–7 | — | 10–12 | 10–12–1 | 9–13–1 | 15–7 | 9–12 | 9–13 |
| Chicago | 17–5 | 12–10 | — | 13–9 | 14–8 | 13–9 | 11–11 | 11–11 |
| Cincinnati | 12–10 | 12–10–1 | 9–13 | — | 8–14 | 13–7 | 12–10 | 12–10 |
| New York | 16–6 | 13–9–1 | 8–14 | 14–8 | — | 17–5 | 11–11 | 14–8 |
| Philadelphia | 9–13 | 7–15 | 9–13 | 7–13 | 5–17 | — | 4–18 | 2–20 |
| Pittsburgh | 16–5 | 12–9 | 11–11 | 10–12 | 11–11 | 18–4 | — | 7–15 |
| St. Louis | 18–4 | 13–9 | 11–11 | 10–12 | 8–14 | 20–2 | 15–7 | — |

=== Roster ===
1928 Cincinnati Reds
Roster
| Pitchers: Pete Appleton; Ken Ash; Jim Beckman; Pete Donohue; Jim Joe Edwards; Si Johnson; Ray Kolp; Red Lucas; Dolf Luque; Jakie May; Carl Mays; Harlan Pyle; Eppa Rixey | Catchers: Bubbles Hargrave; Val Picinich; Clyde Sukeforth; Infielders: Hughie Critz; Chuck Dressen; Hod Ford; George Kelly; Wally Pipp; Pinky Pittinger; Jack White | Outfielders: Ethan Allen; Marty Callaghan; Pid Purdy; Joe Stripp; Curt Walker; Billy Zitzmann | Manager: Jack Hendricks; Coaches: Grover Land; Bobby Wallace; Ivey Wingo |

== Player stats ==
=== Batting ===
==== Starters by position ====
Note: Pos = Position; G = Games played; AB = At bats; H = Hits; Avg. = Batting average; HR = Home runs; RBI = Runs batted in

| Pos | Player | G | AB | H | Avg. | HR | RBI |
|---|---|---|---|---|---|---|---|
| C | Val Picinich | 96 | 324 | 98 | .302 | 7 | 35 |
| 1B | High Pockets Kelly | 116 | 402 | 119 | .296 | 3 | 58 |
| 2B | Hughie Critz | 153 | 641 | 190 | .296 | 5 | 52 |
| SS | Hod Ford | 149 | 506 | 122 | .241 | 0 | 54 |
| 3B | Chuck Dressen | 135 | 498 | 145 | .291 | 1 | 59 |
| OF | Curt Walker | 123 | 427 | 119 | .279 | 6 | 73 |
| OF | Ethan Allen | 129 | 485 | 148 | .305 | 1 | 62 |
| OF | Billy Zitzmann | 101 | 266 | 79 | .297 | 3 | 33 |

==== Other batters ====
Note: G = Games played; AB = At bats; H = Hits; Avg. = Batting average; HR = Home runs; RBI = Runs batted in

| Player | G | AB | H | Avg. | HR | RBI |
|---|---|---|---|---|---|---|
| Wally Pipp | 95 | 272 | 77 | .283 | 2 | 26 |
| Marty Callaghan | 81 | 238 | 69 | .290 | 0 | 24 |
| Pid Purdy | 70 | 223 | 69 | .309 | 0 | 25 |
| Bubbles Hargrave | 65 | 190 | 56 | .295 | 0 | 23 |
| Joe Stripp | 42 | 139 | 40 | .288 | 1 | 17 |
| Clyde Sukeforth | 33 | 53 | 7 | .132 | 0 | 3 |
| Pinky Pittenger | 40 | 38 | 9 | .237 | 0 | 4 |
| Jack White | 1 | 3 | 0 | .000 | 0 | 0 |

=== Pitching ===
==== Starting pitchers ====
Note: G = Games pitched; IP = Innings pitched; W = Wins; L = Losses; ERA = Earned run average; SO = Strikeouts

| Player | G | IP | W | L | ERA | SO |
|---|---|---|---|---|---|---|
| Eppa Rixey | 43 | 291.1 | 19 | 18 | 3.43 | 58 |
| Dolf Luque | 33 | 234.1 | 11 | 10 | 3.57 | 72 |
| Red Lucas | 27 | 167.1 | 13 | 9 | 3.39 | 35 |
| Pete Donohue | 23 | 150.0 | 7 | 11 | 4.74 | 37 |

==== Other pitchers ====
Note: G = Games pitched; IP = Innings pitched; W = Wins; L = Losses; ERA = Earned run average; SO = Strikeouts

| Player | G | IP | W | L | ERA | SO |
|---|---|---|---|---|---|---|
| Ray Kolp | 44 | 209.0 | 13 | 10 | 3.19 | 61 |
| Jakie May | 21 | 79.1 | 3 | 5 | 4.42 | 39 |
| Carl Mays | 14 | 62.2 | 4 | 1 | 3.88 | 10 |
| Ken Ash | 8 | 36.0 | 3 | 3 | 6.50 | 6 |
| Harlan Pyle | 2 | 1.1 | 0 | 0 | 20.25 | 1 |

==== Relief pitchers ====
Note: G = Games pitched; W = Wins; L = Losses; SV = Saves; ERA = Earned run average; SO = Strikeouts

| Player | G | W | L | SV | ERA | SO |
|---|---|---|---|---|---|---|
| Pete Appleton | 31 | 3 | 4 | 0 | 4.68 | 20 |
| Jim Joe Edwards | 18 | 2 | 2 | 2 | 7.59 | 11 |
| Jim Beckman | 6 | 0 | 1 | 0 | 5.87 | 4 |
| Si Johnson | 3 | 0 | 0 | 0 | 4.35 | 1 |

== Farm system ==
| Level | Team | League | Manager |
|---|---|---|---|
| B | Peoria Tractors | Illinois–Indiana–Iowa League | Ernie Krueger |
