= 1928 New York Giants (MLB) season =

1928 New York Giants
- League: National League
- Ballpark: Polo Grounds
- City: New York City
- Record: 93–61 (.604)
- League place: 2nd
- Owners: Charles Stoneham
- Managers: John McGraw

The 1928 New York Giants season was the franchise's 46th season. The team finished in second place in the National League with a 93–61 record, two games behind the St. Louis Cardinals.

== Offseason ==
- January 10, 1928: Rogers Hornsby was traded by the Giants to the Boston Braves for Shanty Hogan and Jimmy Welsh.

== Regular season ==
=== Season standings ===
National League
Team	W	L	Pct.	GB	Home	Road
St. Louis Cardinals	95	59	.617	—	42‍–‍35	53‍–‍24
New York Giants	93	61	.604	2	51‍–‍26	42‍–‍35
Chicago Cubs	91	63	.591	4	52‍–‍25	39‍–‍38
Pittsburgh Pirates	85	67	.559	9	47‍–‍30	38‍–‍37
Cincinnati Reds	78	74	.513	16	44‍–‍33	34‍–‍41
Brooklyn Robins	77	76	.503	17½	41‍–‍35	36‍–‍41
Boston Braves	50	103	.327	44½	25‍–‍51	25‍–‍52
Philadelphia Phillies	43	109	.283	51	26‍–‍49	17‍–‍60

=== Record vs. opponents ===
1928 National League record Sources:
Team	BSN	BRO	CHC	CIN	NYG	PHI	PIT	STL
Boston	—	7–15	5–17	10–12	6–16	13–9	5–16	4–18
Brooklyn	15–7	—	10–12	10–12–1	9–13–1	15–7	9–12	9–13
Chicago	17–5	12–10	—	13–9	14–8	13–9	11–11	11–11
Cincinnati	12–10	12–10–1	9–13	—	8–14	13–7	12–10	12–10
New York	16–6	13–9–1	8–14	14–8	—	17–5	11–11	14–8
Philadelphia	9–13	7–15	9–13	7–13	5–17	—	4–18	2–20
Pittsburgh	16–5	12–9	11–11	10–12	11–11	18–4	—	7–15
St. Louis	18–4	13–9	11–11	10–12	8–14	20–2	15–7	—

=== Roster ===
1928 New York Giants
Roster
Pitchers: Vic Aldridge; Virgil Barnes; Larry Benton; Garland Buckeye; Ben Cantwell; Tiny Chaplin; Bill Clarkson; Jim Faulkner; Freddie Fitzsimmons; Joe Genewich; Dutch Henry; Carl Hubbell; Leo Mangum; Chet Nichols; Jack Scott; Bill Walker	Catchers: Jack Cummings; Bill Haeffner; Shanty Hogan; Bob O'Farrell; Al Spohrer; Infielders: Andy Cohen; Travis Jackson; Freddie Lindstrom; Bill Terry; Russ Wrightstone	Outfielders: George Harper; Art Jahn; Les Mann; Lefty O'Doul; Mel Ott; Joe Price; Andy Reese; Edd Roush; Pat Veltman; Jimmy Welsh; Other batters: Ray Foley; Chick Fullis	Manager: John McGraw; Coaches: Roger Bresnahan

== Player stats ==
=== Batting ===
==== Starters by position ====
Note: Pos = Position; G = Games played; AB = At bats; H = Hits; Avg. = Batting average; HR = Home runs; RBI = Runs batted in

Pos	Player	G	AB	H	Avg.	HR	RBI
C	Shanty Hogan	131	411	137	.333	10	71
1B	Bill Terry	149	568	185	.326	17	101
2B	Andy Cohen	129	504	138	.274	9	59
SS	Travis Jackson	150	537	145	.270	14	77
3B	Freddie Lindstrom	153	646	231	.358	14	107
OF	Mel Ott	124	435	140	.322	18	77
OF	Jimmy Welsh	124	476	146	.307	9	54
OF	Lefty O'Doul	114	354	113	.319	8	46

==== Other batters ====
Note: G = Games played; AB = At bats; H = Hits; Avg. = Batting average; HR = Home runs; RBI = Runs batted in

Player	G	AB	H	Avg.	HR	RBI
Andy Reese	109	406	125	.308	6	44
Les Mann	82	193	51	.264	2	25
Edd Roush	46	163	41	.252	2	13
Bob O'Farrell	75	133	26	.195	2	20
George Harper	19	57	13	.228	2	7
Art Jahn	10	29	8	.276	1	7
Jack Cummings	33	27	9	.333	2	9
Russ Wrightstone	30	25	4	.160	1	5
Pat Veltman	1	3	1	.333	0	0
Al Spohrer	2	2	0	.000	0	0
Ray Foley	2	1	0	.000	0	0
Chick Fullis	11	1	0	.000	0	0
Bill Haeffner	2	1	0	.000	0	0
Joe Price	1	1	0	.000	0	0

=== Pitching ===
==== Starting pitchers ====
Note: G = Games pitched; IP = Innings pitched; W = Wins; L = Losses; ERA = Earned run average; SO = Strikeouts

Player	G	IP	W	L	ERA	SO
Larry Benton	42	310.1	25	9	2.73	90
Freddie Fitzsimmons	40	261.1	20	9	3.68	67
Joe Genewich	26	158.1	11	4	3.18	37
Carl Hubbell	20	124.0	10	6	2.83	37
Vic Aldridge	22	119.1	4	7	4.83	33
Virgil Barnes	10	55.1	3	3	5.04	11
Leo Mangum	1	3.0	0	0	15.00	1

==== Other pitchers ====
Note: G = Games pitched; IP = Innings pitched; W = Wins; L = Losses; ERA = Earned run average; SO = Strikeouts

Player	G	IP	W	L	ERA	SO
Jim Faulkner	38	117.1	9	8	3.53	32
Bill Walker	22	76.1	3	6	4.72	39
Dutch Henry	17	64.0	3	6	3.80	23
Jack Scott	16	50.1	4	1	3.58	17

==== Relief pitchers ====
Note: G = Games pitched; W = Wins; L = Losses; SV = Saves; ERA = Earned run average; SO = Strikeouts

Player	G	W	L	SV	ERA	SO
Tiny Chaplin	12	0	2	0	4.50	5
Ben Cantwell	7	1	0	1	4.42	0
Bill Clarkson	4	0	0	0	7.94	3
Chet Nichols	3	0	0	0	23.63	1
Garland Buckeye	1	0	0	0	14.73	3

== Farm system ==
Level	Team	League	Manager
AA	Buffalo Bisons	International League	Bill Clymer
A	Bridgeport Bears	Eastern League	William Whitman and Bob Emmerich
