= Gus Mancuso =

American baseball player, coach, scout, and broadcaster (1905–1984)

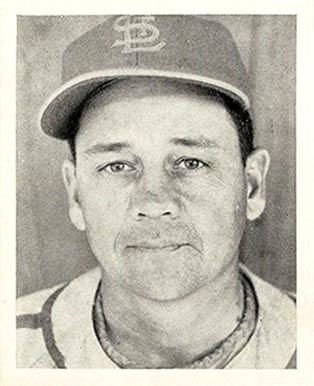
- Catcher
- Born: December 5, 1905; Galveston, Texas, U.S.
- Died: October 26, 1984 (aged 78); Houston, Texas, U.S.
- Batted: Right Threw: Right

MLB debut
- April 30, 1928, for the St. Louis Cardinals

Last MLB appearance
- September 11, 1945, for the Philadelphia Phillies

MLB statistics
- Batting average: .265
- Home runs: 53
- Runs batted in: 543
- Stats at Baseball Reference

Teams
- St. Louis Cardinals (1928, 1930–1932); New York Giants (1933–1938); Chicago Cubs (1939); Brooklyn Dodgers (1940); St. Louis Cardinals (1941–1942); New York Giants (1942–1944); Philadelphia Phillies (1945)

Career highlights and awards
- 2× All-Star (1935, 1937); 2× World Series champion (1931, 1933)

August Rodney Mancuso (December 5, 1905 – October 26, 1984), nicknamed "Blackie", was an American professional baseball player, coach, scout and radio sports commentator. He played as a catcher in Major League Baseball with the St. Louis Cardinals (1928, 1930–32, 1941–42), New York Giants (1933–38, 1942–44), Chicago Cubs (1939), Brooklyn Dodgers (1940) and Philadelphia Phillies (1945).

Mancuso was known for his capable handling of pitching staffs and for his on-field leadership abilities. He was a member of five National League pennant-winning teams, and played as the catcher for five pitchers who were eventually inducted into the Baseball Hall of Fame. Mancuso was regarded as one of the top defensive catchers of the 1930s.

== Baseball career ==
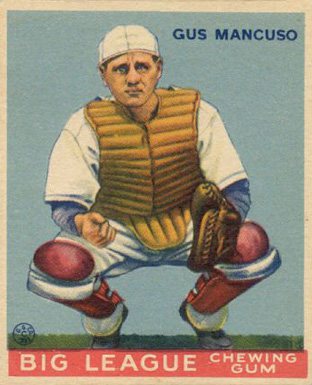
Mancuso with the Giants (c. 1933)

Mancuso was born in Galveston, Texas to the son of a Sicilian immigrant and the daughter of German immigrants. His father died in his forties and his mother continued to support the family by working as a midwife. Mancuso first began to play baseball as a nine-year-old. After graduating from high school, he went to work as a teller at a bank although, he was hired more for his talent as a baseball player than as a teller, playing as a member of the bank's baseball team. He eventually caught the attention of the President of the Houston Buffaloes of the Texas League, and began his professional baseball career with them in 1925.

In 1927, he hit for a .372 batting average for the Syracuse Stars in the International League. He made his Major League debut with the St. Louis Cardinals at the age of 22 on April 30, 1928, and stayed with them until July, when he was sent to the Minneapolis Millers in the American Association. He spent 1929 with St. Louis's American Association farm club, the Rochester Red Wings and with Houston.

The Cardinals returned Mancuso to the major leagues in 1930, primarily because of a contract dispute with Branch Rickey that made Baseball Commissioner Kenesaw Mountain Landis void Mancuso's minor league contract. He served as a reserve catcher to Jimmie Wilson who Mancuso considered one of the best catchers of the era.

Although they competed for the same job, the veteran Wilson provided Mancuso with valuable help in learning the intricacies of catching in the major leagues. Mancuso became a student of the game, learning to study the daily box scores to learn the strengths and weaknesses of opposing teams. On September 12, Wilson sprained his ankle and would not play for the rest of the season. Mancuso rose to the occasion, ending the season with a .366 batting average during a hitters' year when the league average was above .300 for the first and only time.

The Cardinals won the National League pennant but, eventually lost to Connie Mack's Philadelphia Athletics in the 1930 World Series.

In 1931 Mancuso was once again the reserve catcher to Wilson, leading the league with a 54.3% caught stealing percentage as the Cardinals won their second consecutive National League pennant.

The 1931 World Series was a rematch with the Athletics as the Cardinals were victorious in a seven-game series. Mancuso only had one plate appearance during the series as a late-inning pinch hitter. During the 1932 season, Wilson turned 32 years old and shared the catching duties with Mancuso who caught 82 games to Wilson's 75 and hit for a .284 average.

Mancuso was traded to the New York Giants before the 1933 season where new manager Bill Terry was rebuilding the team after the resignation of longtime manager John McGraw. Terry wanted to build his team around speed, defense and pitching. He replaced the slow-footed Shanty Hogan and installed the agile Mancuso as the Giants' starting catcher. Terry allowed Mancuso to be in charge of the Giants' pitching staff that included; Carl Hubbell's sharp-breaking screwball, Hal Schumacher's diving sinker ball, Freddie Fitzsimmons' knuckleball and Roy Parmelee who threw a variety of different pitches. Although Mancuso led National League catchers in errors and passed balls, he also led in games played, baserunners caught stealing, putouts and, finished second in assists and in range factor.

Under Mancuso's guidance, the Giants' pitching staff led the National League in earned run average as the team won their first pennant in nine years, then went on to defeat the Washington Senators in the 1933 World Series. In an Associated Press poll of sportswriters, Mancuso finished second to the Yankees' Bill Dickey as the majors league's all-star catcher based on his ability to handle pitchers so skillfully. Mancuso ranked sixth in voting for the 1933 National League Most Valuable Player Award.

Terry credited Mancuso as a major factor in moving the Giants from sixth place in 1932 to World Series champions in 1933. Between 1933 and 1937, the Giants won three pennants and finished second and third in the other two seasons, winning at least 91 games each year with Mancuso as their regular catcher.

In 1934, the Giants finished in second place, two games behind the eventual world champion St. Louis Cardinals, as Mancuso had an off-year with his batting average dropping almost twenty points along with 10 fewer runs batted in.

In 1935 Mancuso improved to hit for a .298 batting average with five home runs, and 56 runs batted in. He also earned a spot as a reserve for the National League team in the 1935 All-Star Game.

He had his best season in 1936, hitting for a .301 batting average with career-highs of nine home runs and 63 runs batted in as the Giants once again claimed the National League pennant. He led the league's catchers in putouts, baserunners caught stealing, finished second in assists and, once again guided the Giants' pitching staff to the lowest earned run average in the league. The Giants would go down in defeat against the powerful New York Yankees in the 1936 World Series. Mancuso finished the year ranked eighth in voting for the 1936 National League Most Valuable Player Award.

In 1937, Mancuso was hitting for a .283 average at mid-season to earn his second berth as a reserve for the National League team in the 1937 All-Star Game. A few days after the All-Star Game, a foul tip broke the ring finger on Mancuso's right hand. Harry Danning replaced him and played well enough that, when Mancuso was healthy again, the two shared the catching duties for the rest of the season.

The Giants clinched their second consecutive National League pennant and, once again faced the New York Yankees in the 1937 World Series. Mancuso started the first two World Series games but, when he went hitless, Danning took over as the Yankees went on to win the series in five games. Danning took over as the Giants' starting catcher for the 1938 season with Mancuso hitting a respectable .348 with a .411 on-base percentage in 52 games.

The Giants traded Mancuso to the Chicago Cubs before the 1939 season where he shared catching duties with 38-year-old player-manager Gabby Hartnett. He ended the season with a .231 batting average with only two home runs and 17 runs batted in. With the shortage of major league players due to the Second World War, Mancuso saw his career extended for another four years. He played the 1940 season with the Brooklyn Dodgers before the Cardinals brought him back to St. Louis for the 1941 season. Mancuso helped develop the Cardinals' rookie catcher and future star, Walker Cooper but, when Cooper was injured, Mancuso caught the majority of the Cardinals' games in 1941. He was credited with helping the Cardinals to a second-place finish due to his work with rookie pitchers Ernie White (17-7) and Howie Krist (10-0), but only managed to post a .229 batting average.

Mancuso returned to the Giants in 1942 as a backup catcher and pitching coach. When Harry Danning was drafted into the United States Army, Mancuso became the club's starting catcher at age 37, sharing the job with 35-year-old future Hall of Fame member, Ernie Lombardi for the 1943 and 1944 seasons.

At the end of the 1944 season, one month before his 39th birthday, he was released by the Giants. Former teammate Freddie Fitzsimmons was managing the Philadelphia Phillies in 1945 and, convinced Mancuso to play one more season as a catcher and full-time pitching coach. He caught 70 games while sharing catching duties with Andy Seminick but, when Fitzsimmons was fired, Mancuso left the club before the end of the season, playing his final game on September 11 at the age of 40.

== Career statistics ==
In a seventeen-year major league career, Mancuso played in 1,460 games, accumulating 1,194 hits in 4,505 at bats for a .265 career batting average along with 53 home runs, 543 runs batted in, and an on-base percentage of .328. He retired with a .977 fielding percentage. A two-time All-Star, he led National League catchers three times in putouts, and twice in baserunners caught stealing and in range factor. His 50.69% career caught stealing percentage ranks 10th all-time among major league catchers. Mancuso was a member of five pennant-winning teams. He caught for five pitchers who were inducted into the Baseball Hall of Fame (Carl Hubbell, Grover Cleveland Alexander, Dizzy Dean, Burleigh Grimes and Jesse Haines). In his book, The Bill James Historical Baseball Abstract, baseball historian Bill James ranked Mancuso 74th all-time among major league catchers.

== Coaching and broadcasting career ==
In 1946, Mancuso became the player-manager of the minor league Tulsa Oilers and in 1948 he took over as manager of the San Antonio Missions. In 1950, he was hired as the pitching coach for the Cincinnati Reds.

Mancuso began a career as a broadcaster in 1951 with his hometown Houston team in the Texas League. He later moved to St. Louis where he worked with play-by-play announcer Harry Caray on the Cardinals' radio network until 1954. He then served as a scout for the St. Louis Cardinals and the Houston Colt .45s. His younger brother, Frank Mancuso, also was a major league catcher in the mid-1940s. In 1962 Mancuso was seriously injured in a traffic accident which killed his wife, Lorena Mancuso.

Mancuso was inducted into the Texas Sports Hall of Fame in 1981 and was elected to the National Italian American Sports Hall of Fame in 1984. Mancuso contracted emphysema and died in 1984 at the age of 78 in Houston, Texas.

== See also ==
- List of athletes on Wheaties boxes
- List of members of the Italian American Sports Hall of Fame
