= John O'Connell (catcher) =

American baseball player (1904–1992)

- Catcher
- Born: June 13, 1904; Verona, Pennsylvania, U.S.
- Died: October 17, 1992 (aged 88); Canton, Ohio, U.S.
- Batted: Right Threw: Right

MLB debut
- August 16, 1928, for the Pittsburgh Pirates

Last MLB appearance
- October 6, 1929, for the Pittsburgh Pirates

MLB statistics
- Games played: 3
- At bats: 8
- Hits: 1
- Stats at Baseball Reference

Teams
- Pittsburgh Pirates (1928–1929)

John Charles O'Connell (June 13, 1904 – October 17, 1992) was an American baseball player for Major League Baseball. His career was short, and he only played for three games as a catcher in two different seasons for the Pittsburgh Pirates in their 1928 and 1929 season. O'Connell was one of five catchers on the roster in 1928 and among four in 1929, and he saw very little playing time with Charlie Hargreaves serving as the starting catcher on the team those years. Prior to joining the Pirates, O'Connell attended Duquesne University.

He made his major league debut on August 16, 1928, at the age of 24. He played only a few innings and batted only once. It was the only game he played during the 1928 season. He returned near the end of the 1929 season and played two more games for the Pittsburgh Pirates, where his only hit in seven at bats was a double, in which he would score a run. He did not return for the 1930 season and never played in Major League Baseball again. His career stats include three games played, eight at bats, one run, one hit (a double), one base on balls, one strikeout, and a .125 batting average. O'Connell died in Canton, Ohio, on October 17, 1992, at the age of 88.
