= Ray Jacobs (baseball) =

American baseball player (1902–1952)

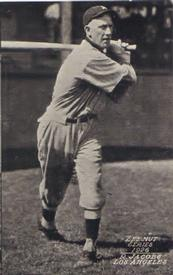
- Jacobs c. 1926
- Pinch hitter
- Born: January 2, 1902; Salt Lake City, Utah, U.S.
- Died: April 5, 1952 (aged 50); Los Angeles, California, U.S.
- Batted: Right Threw: Right

MLB debut
- April 20, 1928, for the Chicago Cubs

Last MLB appearance
- May 2, 1928, for the Chicago Cubs

MLB statistics
- Games played: 2
- At bats: 2
- Hits: 0
- Stats at Baseball Reference

Teams
- Chicago Cubs (1928)

Raymond Frederick Jacobs (born January 2, 1902 – April 5, 1952) was an American infielder in Major League Baseball who made two pinch-hit appearances for the Chicago Cubs in its 1928 season.
