= Harlan Pyle =

American baseball player (1905–1993)

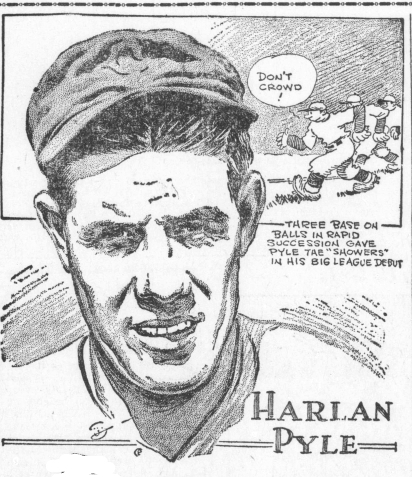
- Pitcher
- Born: November 29, 1905; Burchard, Nebraska, U.S.
- Died: January 13, 1993 (aged 87); Beatrice, Nebraska, U.S.
- Batted: Right Threw: Right

MLB debut
- September 21, 1928, for the Cincinnati Reds

Last MLB appearance
- September 22, 1928, for the Cincinnati Reds

MLB statistics
- Win–loss record: 0–0
- Earned run average: 20.25
- Strikeouts: 1
- Stats at Baseball Reference

Teams
- Cincinnati Reds (1928)

Harlan Albert Pyle (November 29, 1905 – January 13, 1993), nicknamed "Firpo", was an American Major League Baseball pitcher. Pyle appeared in two games for the Cincinnati Reds during the 1928 season.
