= June Greene =

American baseball player (1899-1974)

- Pinch hitter / Pitcher
- Born: June 25, 1899; Ramseur, North Carolina, U.S.
- Died: March 19, 1974 (aged 74); Glendora, California, U.S.
- Batted: Left Threw: Right

MLB debut
- April 20, 1928, for the Philadelphia Phillies

Last MLB appearance
- July 6, 1929, for the Philadelphia Phillies

MLB statistics
- Games played: 32
- Batting average: .280
- Earned run average: 18.38
- Stats at Baseball Reference

Teams
- Philadelphia Phillies (1928–1929)

Julius Foust "June" Greene (June 25, 1899 – March 19, 1974) was an American pinch hitter and pitcher in Major League Baseball. He played for the Philadelphia Phillies in 1928 and 1929.
