= Shanty Hogan =

American baseball player (1906–1967)

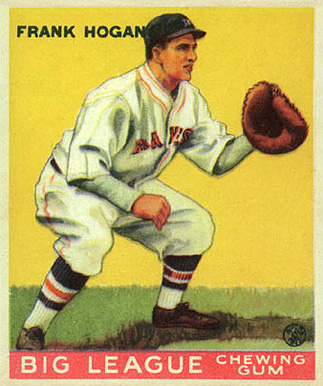
- Catcher
- Born: March 21, 1906; Somerville, Massachusetts, U.S.
- Died: April 7, 1967 (aged 61); Boston, Massachusetts, U.S.
- Batted: Right Threw: Right

MLB debut
- June 23, 1925, for the Boston Braves

Last MLB appearance
- June 13, 1937, for the Washington Senators

MLB statistics
- Batting average: .295
- Home runs: 61
- Runs batted in: 474
- Stats at Baseball Reference

Teams
- Boston Braves (1925–1927); New York Giants (1928–1932); Boston Braves (1933–1935); Washington Senators (1936–1937)

James Francis "Shanty" Hogan (March 21, 1906 – April 7, 1967) was an American professional baseball player. He played in Major League Baseball as a catcher from 1925 to 1937. Hogan was listed at 6 feet 1 inch (1.85 m) and 240 pounds (110 kg) — an exceptionally large player, especially for his era. Due to this, there are many anecdotes relating to Hogan and food. This included several conflicts with manager John McGraw, who often attempted to persuade Hogan to lose weight. He was generally known as a good natured ballplayer and a decent hitter who had his best years with the Giants, hitting over .300 for four consecutive seasons in New York.

== Early life ==
A native of Somerville, Massachusetts, in 1924 Hogan played for the Osterville town team in the Cape Cod Baseball League. Hogan batted .385 on the season, was named team MVP, and reportedly smashed the "longest home run ever seen" at Osterville's West Bay Field. Playing alongside his Somerville High teammate and fellow future-major leaguer Danny MacFayden, the pair led Osterville to the league title.

== Professional career ==
=== Boston Braves ===
Hogan was signed by the Boston Braves on June 18, 1925 as an amateur free agent at the age of 19, and made his major league debut five days later as an outfielder. He was promptly sent to the minor leagues where he played for the Worcester Panthers and the Albany Senators. In 1926, he was sent to play for the Lynn Papooses where he was converted into a catcher. He appeared in 71 games for the Braves in 1927, with 66 hits (including 17 doubles, a triple and three home runs) in 229 at-bats for a .288 batting average. His strong throwing arm was evident as he led National League catchers with an impressive 58.1% caught stealing percentage.

=== New York Giants ===
Before the 1928 season, the Braves management wanted to increase Hogan's home run productivity, so they built bleachers in the left and center fields of the cavernous Braves Field, reducing the distance from home plate to left field from 403 feet to 353 feet and in center field from 550 feet to 387 feet. The Braves then made an about face when they traded Hogan to the New York Giants. In a controversial decision on January 10, 1928, the Giants owner, Charles Stoneham, traded Rogers Hornsby, one of the best hitters in the major leagues, to the Braves in exchange for Hogan and outfielder Jimmy Welsh. Stoneham announced that the trade "was in the best interests of the team." The controversy resurfaced in 1929 when the Giants filed suit against their former treasurer, Francis McQuade, stating that he had hurt the club with his poor decisions regarding trades.

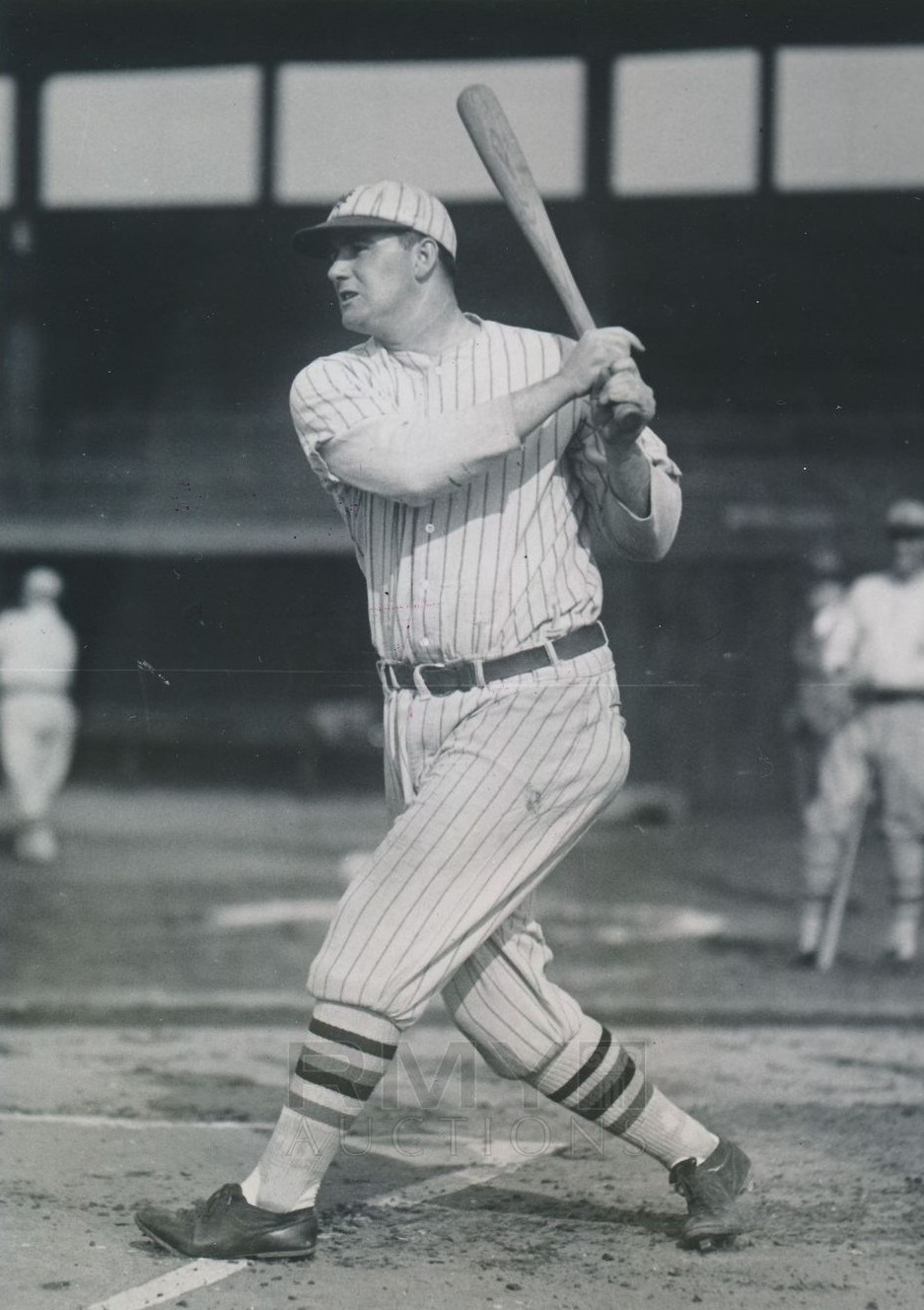
Hogan with the New York Giants in 1928

Despite the controversy, Hogan experienced his first success in the 1928 season, hitting .333, with 25 doubles, 10 home runs and 71 runs batted in to help the Giants finish in second place, two games behind the St. Louis Cardinals. He finished 8th in the balloting for the 1928 National League Most Valuable Player Award.

He was part of a vaudeville act, telling jokes and singing parodies with Andy Cohen, a Jewish teammate from the Giants who played second base for the team. After the 1928 season they started performing on the Loew Circuit, with their first appearance on stage at the Loew's Commodore Theatre in Manhattan on October 15, 1928. The duo earned $1,800 a week, billed as "Cohen & Hogan", except in Boston, when the billings were reversed. In a 1960 interview, Cohen reminisced that "if we didn't kill vaudeville, we sure helped."

His vaudeville / baseball partner Andy Cohen recalled Hogan as someone who "could have been one of the best catchers ever... but he ate himself out of the big leagues." Hogan showed up for camp one year weighing 265 pounds (120 kg) and would run in a rubber suit and take hot showers in an effort to lose weight, but then he'd eat more to regain his strength, and weight. Giants manager John McGraw tried to control Hogan's weight by watching his meal checks, but Hogan developed a system where he would write down foods McGraw would want him to eat, which the waitresses knew to replace with the foods Hogan wanted to eat. As Cohen recalled, "He'd write down spinach, but that meant potatoes. He had a whole code of his own."

Hogan batted .300 with five home runs and 45 RBI in the 1929 season as the Giants dropped to third place in the final standings. He helped guide the Giants pitching staff to the lowest team earned run average in the league. 1930 marked Hogan's best season offensively. His performance was aided by the introduction of a lively ball wound with special Australian wool, resulting in a league batting average that was above .300 for the only time in baseball history. Hogan finished the season with a .339 average, 13 home runs, and 75 runs batted in, as the Giants once again finished in third place.

Hogan would hit above .300 for a fourth consecutive season in 1931, and once again guided the Giants pitching staff to the lowest team earned run average in the league, however, the team still finished the season 13 games behind the eventual world champion St. Louis Cardinals. On August 19, 1931, Hogan was the first catcher to start three double plays – only one other catcher‚ Damian Miller in 1999 – has matched him. He finished the season having committed only 2 errors in 525 total chances, to establish a National League fielding record with a .996 fielding percentage. The record would only last for one year, as it was eclipsed by Earl Grace of the Pittsburgh Pirates in 1932.

The 1932 season was a disastrous one for the Giants as the team fell to sixth place in the season standings. After 30 years as the Giants' manager, McGraw stepped down from the job in the middle of the season and, was replaced by the Giants first baseman, Bill Terry, who became the team's player-manager. Despite performing well, hitting for a .287 average with 8 home runs and 77 runs batted in, the slow-footed Hogan was replaced after the end of the season by the more agile Gus Mancuso, as Terry sought to rebuild the team around speed, defense and pitching. The Giants sold Hogan to the Boston Braves on December 29, 1932, for $25,000.

=== Return to Boston Braves ===
Although Hogan's offensive output diminished during his second stint with the Braves, he continued to perform well defensively in 1933, leading the league's catchers with a .997 fielding percentage and setting a still unbroken major league single-season record for catchers with a 75% caught stealing percentage. Between May 1933 and August 1934, Hogan set a since-broken National League record for catchers by playing in 121 games without committing an error. His batting average improved to .262 in 1934, with four home runs and 34 RBI. He appeared in only 56 games as catcher in 1935, batting .301 and hitting two home runs and 25 RBI. When Hogan was released by the Braves on August 5, 1935, news reports cited his excessive weight as a factor. He was signed as a free agent one week later by the Cleveland Indians, who sent him to the Washington Senators in December 1935.

=== Washington Senators ===
With the Senators, Hogan was a part-time player, batting .323 with a home run and seven RBI in 19 games in 1936. The 1937 season saw him play in 21 games and bat .152, with no home runs and five RBI. He was part of a May 2, 1937, trade that sent him to the Indianapolis Indians of the American Association in exchange for catcher Johnny Riddle, but the trade was voided and the players returned to their original teams on May 20. Hogan played in his last game in the major leagues on June 13, 1937, at the age of 31, and the Senators released him eight days later. He returned to the minor leagues in 1938, playing for the San Diego Padres of the Pacific Coast League. He appeared in five games for the Springfield Nationals in 1939 before retiring as a player at the age of 33.

== Career statistics ==
In a thirteen-year major league career, Hogan played in 989 games, accumulating 939 hits in 3,180 at bats for a .295 career batting average, along with 61 home runs, 474 runs batted in, and a .348 on-base percentage. He finished his career with a .985 fielding percentage, which was 6 points above the league average during his playing career. Hogan led National League catchers twice in fielding percentage, twice in caught stealing percentage and once in putouts.

== Later career ==
Hogan served as a minor league manager for the Hot Springs Bathers of the Cotton States League in 1952. Hogan died on April 7, 1967 at the age of 61 in Boston, Massachusetts.
