= Ed Lennon =

American baseball player (1897-1947)

- Pitcher
- Born: August 17, 1897; Philadelphia, Pennsylvania, U.S.
- Died: September 13, 1947 (aged 50); Philadelphia, Pennsylvania, U.S.
- Batted: Right Threw: Right

MLB debut
- June 30, 1928, for the Philadelphia Phillies

Last MLB appearance
- August 2, 1928, for the Philadelphia Phillies

MLB statistics
- Win–loss record: 0–0
- Earned run average: 8.76
- Strikeouts: 6
- Stats at Baseball Reference

Teams
- Philadelphia Phillies (1928)

Edward Francis Lennon (August 17, 1897 – September 13, 1947) was an American pitcher in Major League Baseball. He played for the Philadelphia Phillies in 1928.
