= Johnny Gooch =

American baseball player (1897–1975)

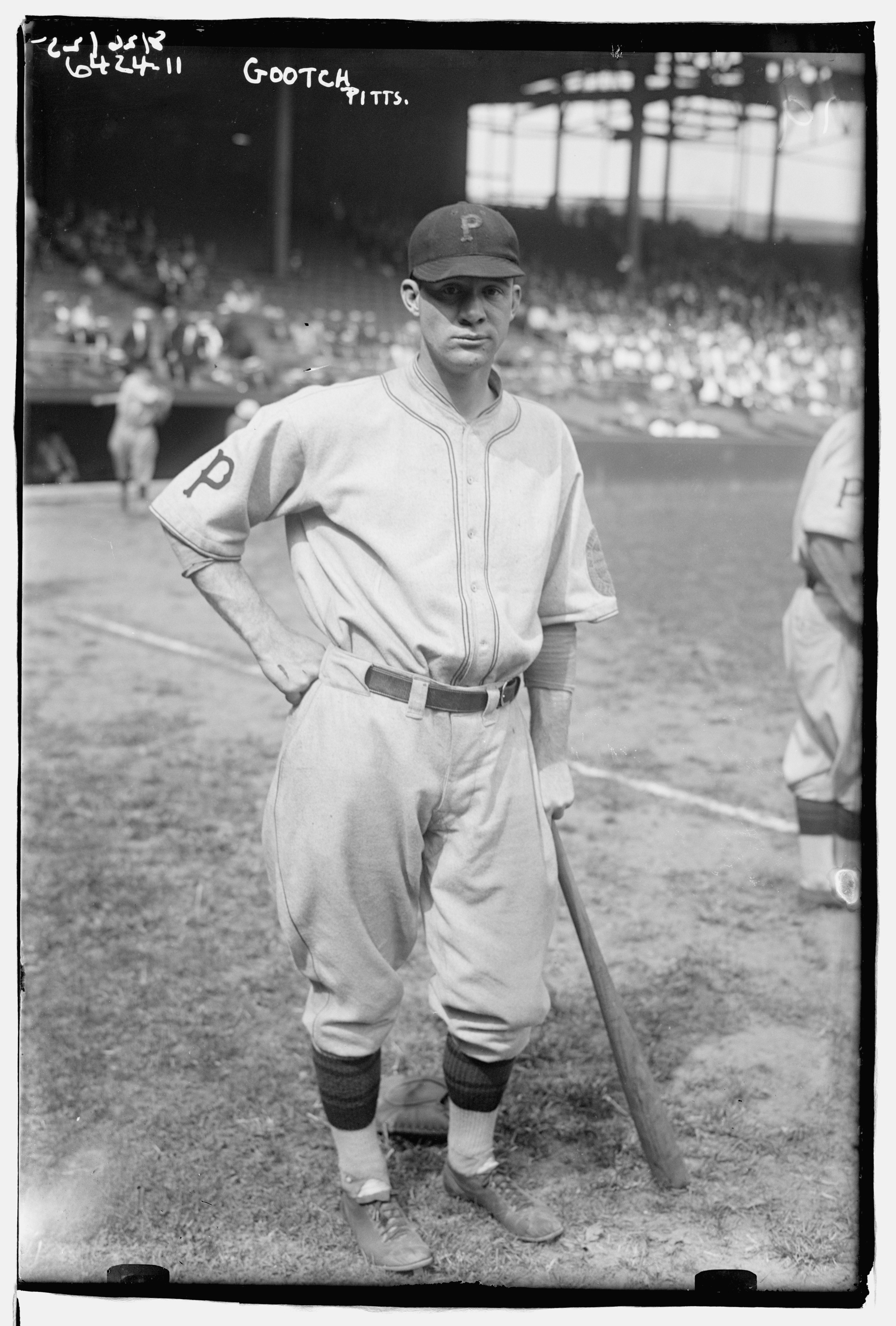
- Catcher
- Born: November 9, 1897; Smyrna, Tennessee, U.S.
- Died: May 15, 1975 (aged 77); Nashville, Tennessee, U.S.
- Batted: Switch Threw: Right

MLB debut
- September 9, 1921, for the Pittsburgh Pirates

Last MLB appearance
- September 12, 1933, for the Boston Red Sox

MLB statistics
- Batting average: .280
- Home runs: 7
- Runs batted in: 293
- Stats at Baseball Reference

Teams
- Pittsburgh Pirates (1921–1928); Brooklyn Robins (1928–1929); Cincinnati Reds (1929–1930); Boston Red Sox (1933)

Career highlights and awards
- World Series champion (1925)

John Beverley Gooch (November 9, 1897 – May 15, 1975) was an American professional baseball player, coach, minor league manager and scout. He played in Major League Baseball as a catcher from 1921 to 1933, most prominently for the Pittsburgh Pirates where he was a member of the 1925 World Series winning team. He also played for the Brooklyn Robins, Cincinnati Reds and the Boston Red Sox. After his playing career ended, Gooch continued to work as a baseball coach and minor league manager. In 1972, Gooch was inducted into the Tennessee Sports Hall of Fame.

== Baseball career ==
Born in Smyrna, Tennessee, Gooch began his professional baseball career in 1916 at the age of 18 with the Talladega Tigers of the Georgia–Alabama League. He didn't play professionally in 1917 or 1918 as he returned to help on the family farm after his oldest brother had died in a drowning accident and his second oldest brother had been called into military service during World War I. Gooch was also called into military service and was aboard a train heading to the service when news of the Armistice broke.

In 1918, Gooch tried out to play for the New Orleans Pelicans but didn't make the team. Despite this setback, the eager Gooch continued to show up for the team's practices. His eagerness to play finally convinced the Pelicans to sign him to a contract. He was sent to play in Cleveland and then to Mobile, where he was released. The Birmingham Barons then signed him after The Barons’ manager, Carlton Molesworth, remembered his dedication during one of his team's visits to play in Mobile. It was in Birmingham where Gooch first played with future Baseball Hall of Fame inductee, Pie Traynor, and the two men developed a lifelong friendship. In 1920, he posted a .288 batting average in 136 games for the Barons.

Gooch made his major league debut with the Pittsburgh Pirates on September 9, 1921 at the age of 22. Gooch had his best season offensively in 1922 when veteran catcher Walter Schmidt, held out for more pay and didn't play until August. He posted a career-high .329 batting average in 105 games, and collected an extra-inning six-hit game, two four-hit games, and eight three-hit games. He also had 102 assists defensively, third best in the league. In 1925, he played as a backup catcher to Earl Smith while posting a .298 batting average along with 30 runs batted in to help the Pirates win the National League pennant. The Pirates then went on to defeat the Washington Senators in the 1925 World Series. He appeared in three games of series and went hitless in 3 at bats.

Gooch played in 101 games in 1927 and had a career-high 48 runs batted in, as the Pirates once again won the National League championship. However, they faced the powerful New York Yankees led by Babe Ruth and Lou Gehrig in the 1927 World Series and were defeated in four straight games. In 1928, the Pirates acquired future Baseball Hall of Fame inductee, Burleigh Grimes, who was the last pitcher allowed to throw the spitball in the major leagues. Pirates manager, Donie Bush chose Gooch to be Grimes' personal catcher, due to his previous experience at catching the tricky spitball.

After spending six and a half years with the Pirates, Gooch was traded in June 1928 along with Joe Harris to the Brooklyn Robins in exchange for Charlie Hargreaves, as the Pirates were seeking a right-handed batter. It was also reported that he had fallen out of favor with the Pirates because of a salary dispute during the off-season. News reports surfaced in January 1929 that Gooch wasn't happy in Brooklyn after having spent so many years in Pittsburgh, and was contemplating retirement. That April, he was traded to the Cincinnati Reds for Val Picinich. He experienced a rejuvenation by hitting for a .300 batting average in 92 games for the seventh-place Reds. After one more season with the Reds where his batting average dropped to .243, he was traded to the Nashville Volunteers in the Southern Association for Joe Cicero. He posted a .334 batting average in 117 games during the Volunteers' 1932 season. In January 1933, he returned to the major leagues when his contract was bought by the Boston Red Sox. Gooch's playing time was diminished when the Red Sox acquired catcher Rick Ferrell in May. He appeared in 37 games for the Red Sox and played in his final major league game on September 12, 1933, at the age of 37.

== Career statistics ==
In an eleven-year major league career, Gooch played in 805 games, accumulating 662 hits in 2,363 at-bats for a .280 career batting average along with 7 home runs, 293 runs batted in and an on-base percentage of .342. He had a career fielding percentage of .973.

== Managerial and coaching career ==
Gooch was hired by the Cincinnati Reds to be a player-manager for the Durham Bulls of the Piedmont League in December 1935. He was credited with helping young pitcher Johnny Vander Meer cure the wildness of his pitching. Vander Meer went on to become the only pitcher in Major League Baseball history to pitch two consecutive no hitters. Gooch was then hired as the manager for the Mount Airy Reds of the Bi-State League. In January 1937, the Pirates hired Gooch to be their pitching coach, at the urging of his old friend, Pie Traynor, who was then managing the Pirates. In October 1939, the Pirates released him as a coach, then immediately rehired him as a scout. The Pirates then named him to be the manager for their minor league affiliate, the Hutchinson Pirates of the Western Association for the 1941 season. His final year in baseball was 1942, as a player-manager for the Bluefield Blue–Grays in the Mountain State League.

== Later life ==
After retiring from baseball management, Gooch opened a baseball bat factory in Nashville. In 1972, Gooch was inducted into the Tennessee Sports Hall of Fame.

Gooch died on May 15, 1975, in Nashville, Tennessee, at the age of 77.

== See also ==
- List of Major League Baseball single-game hits leaders
