= 1928 St. Louis Cardinals season =

Major League Baseball season

1928 St. Louis Cardinals
- National League champions
- League: National League
- Ballpark: Sportsman's Park
- City: St. Louis, Missouri
- Record: 95–59 (.617)
- League place: 1st
- Owners: Sam Breadon
- General managers: Branch Rickey
- Managers: Bill McKechnie
- Radio: KMOX (Garnett Marks); KWK (Thomas Patrick); WIL (William Elsworth)

1928 photograph of St. Louis Cardinals player Andy High

The 1928 St. Louis Cardinals season was the team's 47th season in St. Louis, Missouri and the 37th season in the National League. The Cardinals went 95–59 during the season and finished first in the National League. In the World Series, they were swept by the New York Yankees.

== Offseason ==
- December 14, 1927: Frank Gibson was purchased by the Cardinals from the Boston Braves.

== Regular season ==
First baseman Jim Bottomley won the MVP Award this year, batting .325, with 31 home runs and 136 RBIs.

=== Season standings ===
National League
Team	W	L	Pct.	GB	Home	Road
St. Louis Cardinals	95	59	.617	—	42‍–‍35	53‍–‍24
New York Giants	93	61	.604	2	51‍–‍26	42‍–‍35
Chicago Cubs	91	63	.591	4	52‍–‍25	39‍–‍38
Pittsburgh Pirates	85	67	.559	9	47‍–‍30	38‍–‍37
Cincinnati Reds	78	74	.513	16	44‍–‍33	34‍–‍41
Brooklyn Robins	77	76	.503	17½	41‍–‍35	36‍–‍41
Boston Braves	50	103	.327	44½	25‍–‍51	25‍–‍52
Philadelphia Phillies	43	109	.283	51	26‍–‍49	17‍–‍60

=== Record vs. opponents ===
1928 National League record Sources:
Team	BSN	BRO	CHC	CIN	NYG	PHI	PIT	STL
Boston	—	7–15	5–17	10–12	6–16	13–9	5–16	4–18
Brooklyn	15–7	—	10–12	10–12–1	9–13–1	15–7	9–12	9–13
Chicago	17–5	12–10	—	13–9	14–8	13–9	11–11	11–11
Cincinnati	12–10	12–10–1	9–13	—	8–14	13–7	12–10	12–10
New York	16–6	13–9–1	8–14	14–8	—	17–5	11–11	14–8
Philadelphia	9–13	7–15	9–13	7–13	5–17	—	4–18	2–20
Pittsburgh	16–5	12–9	11–11	10–12	11–11	18–4	—	7–15
St. Louis	18–4	13–9	11–11	10–12	8–14	20–2	15–7	—

=== Roster ===
1928 St. Louis Cardinals
Roster
Pitchers: Pete Alexander; Fred Frankhouse; Hal Haid; Jesse Haines; Syl Johnson; Tony Kaufmann; Carlisle Littlejohn; Clarence Mitchell; Art Reinhart; Flint Rhem; Bill Sherdel	Catchers: Spud Davis; Gus Mancuso; Bob O'Farrell; Earl Smith; Jimmie Wilson; Infielders: Jim Bottomley; Frankie Frisch; Andy High; Wattie Holm; Rabbit Maranville; Tommy Thevenow; Specs Toporcer	Outfielders: Ray Blades; Taylor Douthit; Chick Hafey; George Harper; Pepper Martin; Ernie Orsatti; Wally Roettger; Other batters: Howie Williamson	Manager: Bill McKechnie; Coaches: Jack Onslow; Allen Sothoron

== Player stats ==
=== Batting ===
==== Starters by position ====
Note: Pos = Position; G = Games played; AB = At bats; H = Hits; Avg. = Batting average; HR = Home runs; RBI = Runs batted in

Pos	Player	G	AB	H	Avg.	HR	RBI
C	Jimmie Wilson	120	411	106	.258	2	50
1B	Jim Bottomley	149	576	187	.325	31	136
2B	Frankie Frisch	141	547	164	.300	10	86
SS	Rabbit Maranville	112	366	88	.240	1	34
3B	Wattie Holm	102	386	107	.277	3	47
OF	George Harper	99	272	83	.305	17	58
OF	Chick Hafey	138	520	175	.337	27	111
OF	Taylor Douthit	154	648	191	.295	3	43

==== Other batters ====
Note: G = Games played; AB = At bats; H = Hits; Avg. = Batting average; HR = Home runs; RBI = Runs batted in

Player	G	AB	H	Avg.	HR	RBI
Andy High	111	368	105	.285	6	37
Wally Roettger	68	261	89	.341	6	44
Tommy Thevenow	69	171	35	.205	0	13
Ray Blades	51	85	20	.235	1	19
Ernie Orsatti	27	69	21	.304	3	15
Earl Smith	24	58	13	.224	0	7
Bob O'Farrell	16	52	11	.212	0	4
Gus Mancuso	40	38	7	.184	0	3
Specs Toporcer	8	14	0	.000	0	0
Pepper Martin	39	13	4	.308	0	0
Howie Williamson	10	9	2	.222	0	0
Spud Davis	2	5	1	.200	0	1

=== Pitching ===
==== Starting pitchers ====
Note: G = Games pitched; IP = Innings pitched; W = Wins; L = Losses; ERA = Earned run average; SO = Strikeouts

Player	G	IP	W	L	ERA	SO
Bill Sherdel	38	248.2	21	10	2.86	72
Pete Alexander	34	243.2	16	9	3.36	59
Jesse Haines	33	240.1	20	8	3.18	77
Flint Rhem	28	169.2	11	8	4.14	47

==== Other pitchers ====
Note: G = Games pitched; IP = Innings pitched; W = Wins; L = Losses; ERA = Earned run average; SO = Strikeouts

Player	G	IP	W	L	ERA	SO
Clarence Mitchell	19	150.0	8	9	3.30	31
Syl Johnson	34	120.0	8	4	3.90	66
Fred Frankhouse	21	84.0	3	2	3.96	29
Art Reinhart	23	75.1	4	6	2.87	12
Tony Kaufmann	4	4.2	0	0	9.64	2

==== Relief pitchers ====
Note: G = Games pitched; W = Wins; L = Losses; SV = Saves; ERA = Earned run average; SO = Strikeouts

Player	G	W	L	SV	ERA	SO
Hal Haid	27	2	2	5	2.30	21
Carlisle Littlejohn	12	2	1	0	3.66	6

== 1928 World Series ==
Game	Date	Visitor	Score	Home	Score	Record (NYY-STL)	Attendance
1	October 4	St. Louis Cardinals	1	New York Yankees	4	1–0	61,425
2	October 5	St. Louis Cardinals	3	New York Yankees	9	2–0	60,714
3	October 7	New York Yankees	7	St. Louis Cardinals	3	3–0	39,602
4	October 9	New York Yankees	7	St. Louis Cardinals	3	4–0	37,331
New York Yankees win 4–0

== Farm system ==
Level	Team	League	Manager
AA	Rochester Red Wings	International League	Billy Southworth
A	Houston Buffaloes	Texas League	Frank Snyder
B	Danville Veterans	Illinois–Indiana–Iowa League	Joe Schultz, Sr.
C	Topeka Jayhawks	Western Association	Eddie Dyer
D	Laurel Cardinals	Cotton States League	John Ganzel and Bobby Schang

LEAGUE CHAMPIONS: Rochester, Houston
