= Jack White (infielder) =

American baseball player (1905–1971)

- Infielder
- Born: August 31, 1905; New York City, New York
- Died: June 19, 1971 (aged 65); Flushing, New York
- Batted: Switch Threw: Right

MLB debut
- June 22, 1927, for the Cincinnati Reds

Last MLB appearance
- April 19, 1928, for the Cincinnati Reds

MLB statistics
- At bats: 7
- Runs: 1
- Hits: 0
- Stats at Baseball Reference

Teams
- Cincinnati Reds (1927–1928)

John Peter White (August 31, 1905 – June 19, 1971) was a professional baseball infielder who played three seasons in the sport, two of which were spent in Major League Baseball. In six total major league games from 1927 to 1928, White went hitless in seven at-bats. On the defensive side, White played four games at second base and two games at shortstop.

== Early life ==
White was born in New York City on August 31, 1905. He attended Fordham University from 1924 to 1927.

== Professional career ==
Just out of Fordham University, White began his professional career in 1927. White played three games with the Class-A Providence Grays in minor league baseball. He made his major league debut on June 22, 1927. In five games that season with the major league Cincinnati Reds, White had no hits, and one run in four at-bats. Along with Ken Ash, White was sent to the minor leagues on April 24, 1928. On the defensive side, White played three games at second base, and two games at shortstop; and in eight total chances, committed no errors, made three putouts, made five assists, and helped convert one double play. In 1928, White played in the minor leagues with the Double-A Toledo Mud Hens and Double-A Columbus Senators. He batted .304 with 22 runs, 38 hits, two doubles, four triples, and two stolen bases in 46 combined games. With the Reds that season, White went hitless in three at-bats. In his one-game, White played second base. That season would prove to be White's final season in the major leagues. In 1928, White played for the Double-A Columbus Senators. In 14 games that season, White batted .171 with six hits, and one triple.

== Later life ==
White died on June 19, 1971, in Flushing, Queens and was buried at Saint Raymond's Cemetery in the Bronx, New York City.
