= 1928 Chicago Cubs season =

1928 Chicago Cubs
- League: National League
- Ballpark: Wrigley Field
- City: Chicago
- Record: 91–63 (.591)
- League place: 3rd
- Owners: William Wrigley Jr.
- Managers: Joe McCarthy
- Radio: WCFL (Johnny O'Hara); WGN (Quin Ryan); WMAQ (Hal Totten)

The 1928 Chicago Cubs season was the 57th season of the Chicago Cubs franchise, the 53rd in the National League and the 13th at Wrigley Field. The Cubs finished third in the National League with a record of 91–63. Future Hall of Famer Gabby Hartnett hit .302, with 14 home runs in 388 at-bats. He led the league with 103 assists.

== Regular season ==
=== Season standings ===
National League
Team	W	L	Pct.	GB	Home	Road
St. Louis Cardinals	95	59	.617	—	42‍–‍35	53‍–‍24
New York Giants	93	61	.604	2	51‍–‍26	42‍–‍35
Chicago Cubs	91	63	.591	4	52‍–‍25	39‍–‍38
Pittsburgh Pirates	85	67	.559	9	47‍–‍30	38‍–‍37
Cincinnati Reds	78	74	.513	16	44‍–‍33	34‍–‍41
Brooklyn Robins	77	76	.503	17½	41‍–‍35	36‍–‍41
Boston Braves	50	103	.327	44½	25‍–‍51	25‍–‍52
Philadelphia Phillies	43	109	.283	51	26‍–‍49	17‍–‍60

=== Record vs. opponents ===
1928 National League record Sources:
Team	BSN	BRO	CHC	CIN	NYG	PHI	PIT	STL
Boston	—	7–15	5–17	10–12	6–16	13–9	5–16	4–18
Brooklyn	15–7	—	10–12	10–12–1	9–13–1	15–7	9–12	9–13
Chicago	17–5	12–10	—	13–9	14–8	13–9	11–11	11–11
Cincinnati	12–10	12–10–1	9–13	—	8–14	13–7	12–10	12–10
New York	16–6	13–9–1	8–14	14–8	—	17–5	11–11	14–8
Philadelphia	9–13	7–15	9–13	7–13	5–17	—	4–18	2–20
Pittsburgh	16–5	12–9	11–11	10–12	11–11	18–4	—	7–15
St. Louis	18–4	13–9	11–11	10–12	8–14	20–2	15–7	—

=== Roster ===
1928 Chicago Cubs
Roster
Pitchers: Sheriff Blake; Guy Bush; Hal Carlson; Ed Holley; Percy Jones; Pat Malone; Art Nehf; Charlie Root; Ben Tincup; Lefty Weinert; Johnny Welch	Catchers: Mike González; Gabby Hartnett; Infielders: Clyde Beck; Johnny Butler; Woody English; Charlie Grimm; Joe Kelly; Freddie Maguire; Norm McMillan; Elmer Yoter	Outfielders: Kiki Cuyler; Cliff Heathcote; Riggs Stephenson; Earl Webb; Hack Wilson; Other batters: Ray Jacobs; Johnny Moore	Manager: Joe McCarthy; Coaches: Jimmy Burke; Mickey Doolan

== Player stats ==
=== Batting ===
==== Starters by position ====
Note: Pos = Position; G = Games played; AB = At bats; H = Hits; Avg. = Batting average; HR = Home runs; RBI = Runs batted in

Pos	Player	G	AB	H	Avg.	HR	RBI
C	Gabby Hartnett	120	388	117	.302	14	57
1B	Charlie Grimm	147	547	161	.294	5	62
2B	Freddie Maguire	140	574	160	.279	1	41
SS	Woody English	116	475	142	.299	2	34
3B	Clyde Beck	131	483	124	.257	3	52
OF	Riggs Stephenson	137	512	166	.324	8	90
OF	Kiki Cuyler	133	499	142	.285	17	79
OF	Hack Wilson	145	520	163	.313	31	120

==== Other batters ====
Note: G = Games played; AB = At bats; H = Hits; Avg. = Batting average; HR = Home runs; RBI = Runs batted in

Player	G	AB	H	Avg.	HR	RBI
Johnny Butler	62	174	47	.270	0	16
Mike González	49	158	43	.272	1	21
Earl Webb	62	140	35	.250	3	23
Cliff Heathcote	67	137	39	.285	3	18
Norm McMillan	49	123	27	.220	1	12
Joe Kelly	32	52	11	.212	1	7
Johnny Moore	4	4	0	.000	0	0
Ray Jacobs	2	2	0	.000	0	0
Elmer Yoter	1	0	0	----	0	0

=== Pitching ===
==== Starting pitchers ====
Note: G = Games pitched; IP = Innings pitched; W = Wins; L = Losses; ERA = Earned run average; SO = Strikeouts

Player	G	IP	W	L	ERA	SO
Sheriff Blake	34	240.2	17	11	2.47	78
Charlie Root	40	237.0	14	18	3.57	122
Art Nehf	31	176.2	13	7	2.65	40

==== Other pitchers ====
Note: G = Games pitched; IP = Innings pitched; W = Wins; L = Losses; ERA = Earned run average; SO = Strikeouts

Player	G	IP	W	L	ERA	SO
Pat Malone	42	250.2	18	13	2.84	155
Guy Bush	42	204.1	15	6	3.83	61
Percy Jones	39	154.0	10	6	4.03	41
Hal Carlson	20	56.1	3	2	5.91	11

==== Relief pitchers ====
Note: G = Games pitched; W = Wins; L = Losses; SV = Saves; ERA = Earned run average; SO = Strikeouts

Player	G	W	L	SV	ERA	SO
Ed Holley	13	0	0	0	3.77	10
Lefty Weinert	10	1	0	0	5.29	8
Johnny Welch	3	0	0	0	15.75	2
Ben Tincup	2	0	0	0	7.00	3

== Farm system ==
Level	Team	League	Manager
AA	Reading Keystones	International League	Harry Hinchman
AA	Los Angeles Angels	Pacific Coast League	Marty Krug
