= Elmer Tutwiler =

American baseball player (1904–1976)

- Pitcher
- Born: November 19, 1904; Carbon Hill, Alabama, U.S.
- Died: May 3, 1976 (aged 71); Pensacola, Florida, U.S.
- Batted: Right Threw: Right

MLB debut
- August 20, 1928, for the Pittsburgh Pirates

Last MLB appearance
- September 27, 1928, for the Pittsburgh Pirates

MLB statistics
- Games pitched: 2
- Earned run average: 4.91
- Strikeouts: 1
- Stats at Baseball Reference

Teams
- Pittsburgh Pirates (1928)

Elmer Strange Tutwiler (November 19, 1904 – May 3, 1976) was an American Major League Baseball pitcher who played in two games with the Pittsburgh Pirates in 1928.
