= Charlie Fitzberger =

American baseball player (1904–1965)

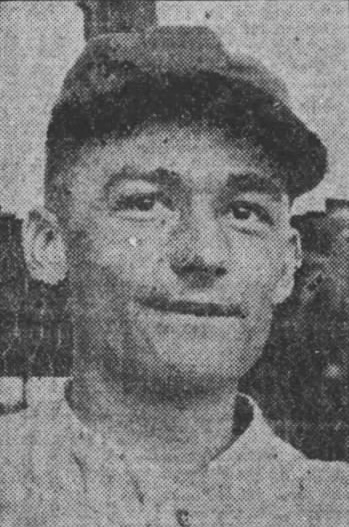
- Born: February 13, 1904; Baltimore, Maryland
- Died: January 25, 1965 (aged 60); Baltimore, Maryland
- Batted: Left Threw: Left

MLB debut
- September 11, 1928, for the Boston Braves

Last MLB appearance
- September 25, 1928, for the Boston Braves

Teams
- Boston Braves (1928)

Charles Caspar Fitzberger (February 13, 1904 – January 25, 1965) was a Major League Baseball player for the Boston Braves during the end of the 1928 season. His major league debut on September 11, 1928, was against the New York Giants. He went 2-for-7 for a batting average of .286.

In 1930, he played for the Allentown Brooks.

Fitzberger died in his hometown of Baltimore, Maryland, at the age of 60.
