= Max West (1920s outfielder) =

American baseball player (1904–1971)

- Outfielder
- Born: July 14, 1904; Sunset, Texas
- Died: April 25, 1971 (aged 66); Houston, Texas
- Batted: Right Threw: Right

MLB debut
- September 18, 1928, for the Brooklyn Robins

Last MLB appearance
- October 5, 1929, for the Brooklyn Robins

MLB statistics
- Batting average: .276
- Home runs: 0
- Runs batted in: 2
- Stats at Baseball Reference

Teams
- Brooklyn Robins (1928–1929)

Walter Maxwell West Sr. (July 14, 1904 – April 25, 1971), was a professional baseball player who played outfield in the Major Leagues for the Brooklyn Robins during the 1928 and 1929 baseball seasons. He attended the University of North Texas.
