= Jim Faulkner =

American baseball player (1899-1962)

- Pitcher
- Born: July 27, 1899; Beatrice, Nebraska, U.S.
- Died: June 1, 1962 (aged 62); West Palm Beach, Florida, U.S.
- Batted: Switch Threw: Left

MLB debut
- September 15, 1927, for the New York Giants

Last MLB appearance
- April 23, 1930, for the Brooklyn Robins

MLB statistics
- Win–loss record: 10–8
- Earned run average: 3.74
- Strikeouts: 34
- Stats at Baseball Reference

Teams
- New York Giants (1927–1928); Brooklyn Robins (1930)

James Leroy Faulkner (July 27, 1899 in Beatrice, Nebraska – June 1, 1962 in West Palm Beach, Florida) was an American pitcher in Major League Baseball. He pitched from 1927 to 1930.
