= Howie Williamson =

American baseball player (1904–1969)

- Outfielder
- Born: December 23, 1904; Little Rock, Arkansas, U.S.
- Died: August 15, 1969 (aged 64); Texarkana, Arkansas, U.S.
- Batted: Left Threw: Left

MLB debut
- July 7, 1928, for the St. Louis Cardinals

Last MLB appearance
- August 17, 1928, for the St. Louis Cardinals

MLB statistics
- Batting average: .222
- At bats: 9
- Hits: 2
- Stats at Baseball Reference

Teams
- St. Louis Cardinals (1928)

Nathaniel Howard Williamson (December 23, 1904 – August 15, 1969) was an American professional baseball player. He played one season in Major League Baseball in 1928 for the St. Louis Cardinals, primarily as an outfielder.
