= Fred Fussell =

American baseball player (1895–1966)

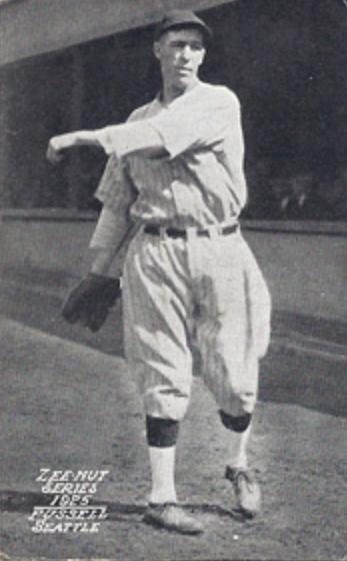
- Pitcher
- Born: October 7, 1895; Sheridan, Missouri, US
- Died: October 23, 1966 (aged 71); Syracuse, New York, US
- Batted: Left Threw: Left

MLB debut
- September 23, 1922, for the Chicago Cubs

Last MLB appearance
- September 29, 1929, for the Pittsburgh Pirates

MLB statistics
- Win–loss record: 14–17
- Earned run average: 4.86
- Strikeouts: 103
- Stats at Baseball Reference

Teams
- Chicago Cubs (1922–1923); Pittsburgh Pirates (1928–1929)

Frederick Morris Fussell (October 7, 1895 – October 23, 1966) was an American pitcher in Major League Baseball. He played for the Chicago Cubs and Pittsburgh Pirates. Fussell was 5 feet, 10 inches tall and weighed 155 pounds.

== Career ==
Fussell was born in Sheridan, Missouri, in 1895. He started his professional baseball career in 1922 with the Chicago Cubs. That season, he played in three MLB games in September and October and had a win–loss record of 1–1. In 1923, Fussell mostly pitched in relief for Chicago. He appeared in 28 games, going 3–5 and tying for the team-lead with three saves.

Fussell spent the next several years in the minor leagues. He played for the Pacific Coast League's Seattle Indians in 1924 and 1925 and then went to the Texas League's Wichita Falls Spudders. In 1927, he won a career-high 21 games for the Spudders, and he was traded to the Pittsburgh Pirates that December for Mike Cvengros and Ike Danning. He pitched well the following spring and made the Pirates roster.

Fussell was a major league starter during the 1928 season. In 159.2 innings pitched, he went 8–9 with a 3.61 earned run average. In 1929, he was a reliever, and his ERA jumped up to 8.62. He was released after the season and never played in the majors again.

During the 1930s, Fussell pitched for various teams in the International League, including the Buffalo Bisons and Syracuse Chiefs. In 1933, he threw a no-hitter in a night game; he was subsequently nicknamed "Moonlight Ace". Fussell's professional baseball career ended in 1939. He retired with a career minor league record of 150–118 to go along with his 14–17 major league one.

In his later years, Fussell lived in Syracuse, New York, and worked as a lathe operator. Late in Fussell's life, Baseball Hall of Fame historian Lee Allen wrote a piece about him in a Baseball Digest article. He died in 1966.
