= Les Bartholomew =

American baseball player (1903–1972)

- Pitcher
- Born: April 4, 1903; Madison, Wisconsin, U.S.
- Died: September 19, 1972 (aged 69); Barrington, Illinois, U.S.
- Batted: Right Threw: Left

MLB debut
- April 11, 1928, for the Pittsburgh Pirates

Last MLB appearance
- August 19, 1932, for the Chicago White Sox

MLB statistics
- Win–loss record: 0–0
- Earned run average: 6.75
- Strikeouts: 7
- Stats at Baseball Reference

Teams
- Pittsburgh Pirates (1928); Chicago White Sox (1932)

Lester Justin Bartholomew (April 4, 1903 – September 19, 1972) was an American professional baseball pitcher in Major League Baseball. He played for the Pittsburgh Pirates and Chicago White Sox. Bartholomew weighed 195 lbs, batted right-handed, and threw left-handed.
