= Jim Beckman =

American baseball player (1905–1974)

- Pitcher
- Born: March 1, 1905; Cincinnati, Ohio
- Died: December 5, 1974 (aged 69); Montgomery, Ohio
- Batted: Right Threw: Right

MLB debut
- July 27, 1927, for the Cincinnati Reds

Last MLB appearance
- September 22, 1928, for the Cincinnati Reds

MLB statistics
- Win–loss record: 0-2
- Earned run average: 5.86
- Strikeouts: 4
- Stats at Baseball Reference

Teams
- Cincinnati Reds (1927–1928)

James Joseph Beckman (March 1, 1905 – December 5, 1974) was a pitcher in Major League Baseball. He played for the Cincinnati Reds.
