= Harvey MacDonald =

American baseball player (1898-1965)

- Pinch hitter
- Born: May 18, 1898; New York, New York, U.S.
- Died: October 4, 1965 (aged 67); Manoa, Pennsylvania, U.S.
- Batted: Left Threw: Left

MLB debut
- June 12, 1928, for the Philadelphia Phillies

Last MLB appearance
- July 19, 1928, for the Philadelphia Phillies

MLB statistics
- Batting average: .250
- Home runs: 0
- Runs batted in: 2
- Stats at Baseball Reference

Teams
- Philadelphia Phillies (1922)

Harvey Forsyth MacDonald (May 18, 1898 – October 4, 1965) was an American Major League Baseball player who played in 13 games for the Philadelphia Phillies in 1928. He was used as a pinch hitter in 11 of his 13 games.

He died October 4, 1965, and was interred at Glenwood Memorial Gardens in Broomall, Pennsylvania.
