= Bill Deitrick =

American baseball player (1902-1946)

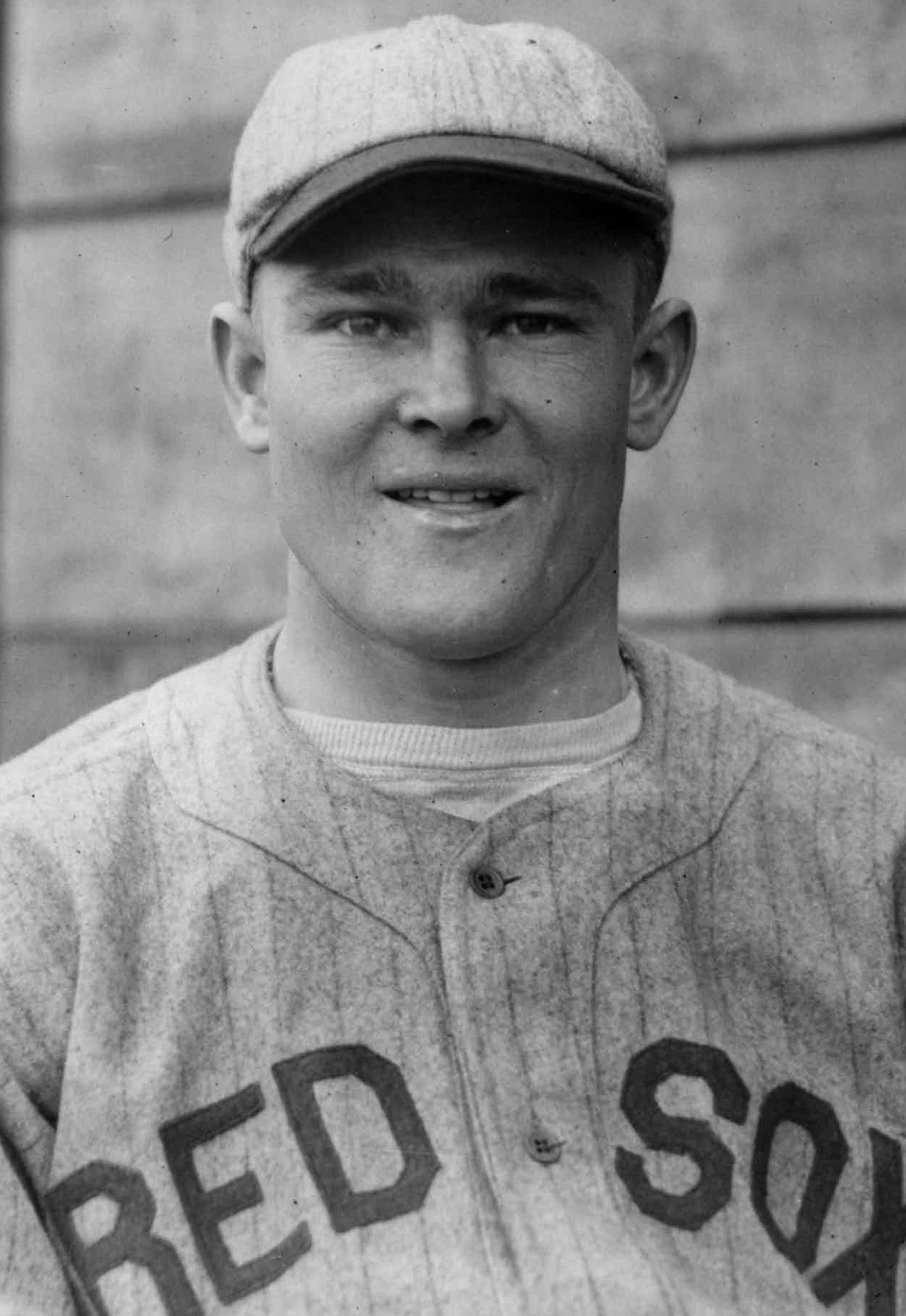
- Left fielder/Shortstop
- Born: April 30, 1902; Hanover County, Virginia, U.S.
- Died: May 6, 1946 (aged 44); Bethesda, Maryland, U.S.
- Batted: Right Threw: Right

MLB debut
- September 19, 1927, for the Philadelphia Phillies

Last MLB appearance
- September 27, 1928, for the Philadelphia Phillies

MLB statistics
- Batting average: .198
- Hits: 20
- Runs: 14
- Stats at Baseball Reference

Teams
- Philadelphia Phillies (1927–1928)

William Alexander Deitrick (April 30, 1902 – May 6, 1946) was a Major League Baseball left fielder and shortstop. He played for the Philadelphia Phillies from 1927 to 1928, playing in 57 career games.
