= Earl Williams (1920s catcher) =

American baseball player (1903–1958)

- Catcher
- Born: January 27, 1903; Cumberland Gap, Tennessee, U.S.
- Died: March 10, 1958 (aged 55); Knoxville, Tennessee, U.S.
- Batted: Right Threw: Right

MLB debut
- May 27, 1928, for the Boston Braves

Last MLB appearance
- June 2, 1928, for the Boston Braves

MLB statistics
- Games played: 3
- At bats: 2
- Hits: 0
- Stats at Baseball Reference

Earl Baxter Williams (January 27, 1903 – March 10, 1958) was an American professional baseball player. He played three games in Major League Baseball (MLB) for the Boston Braves in 1928, two as a pinch hitter and one as a catcher.

Williams was a catcher at Maryville College (1921-1924). He broke into organized baseball in 1924 with the Morristown Roosters of the Appalachian League. After four seasons of independent league ball, he was drafted by the Boston Braves from the Asheville Tourists of the South Atlantic League in the 1927 rule 5 draft.

He made his major league debut on May 27, 1928. He was hitless in two at bats with a strikeout in three games. He continued to play minor league ball through 1932.

Williams was a World War II veteran. He was a collector for the U.S. Internal Revenue Service for twenty years. He died at age 55 at St. Mary's Hospital in Knoxville, Tennessee from an apparent heart attack on March 10, 1958, and is buried at Highland Memorial Cemetery in Knoxville.
