= Bill Clarkson =

American baseball player (1898-1971)

- Pitcher
- Born: September 27, 1898; Portsmouth, Virginia, U.S.
- Died: August 27, 1971 (aged 72); Raleigh, North Carolina, U.S.
- Batted: Right Threw: Right

MLB debut
- May 2, 1927, for the New York Giants

Last MLB appearance
- October 6, 1929, for the Boston Braves

MLB statistics
- Win–loss record: 3-12
- Earned run average: 5.44
- Strikeouts: 39
- Stats at Baseball Reference

Teams
- New York Giants (1927–1928); Boston Braves (1928–1929)

William Henry Clarkson (September 27, 1898 – August 27, 1971), also known as "Blackie", was an American pitcher in Major League Baseball. He played for the New York Giants and Boston Braves.
