= George Grantham (baseball) =

American baseball player (1900–1954)

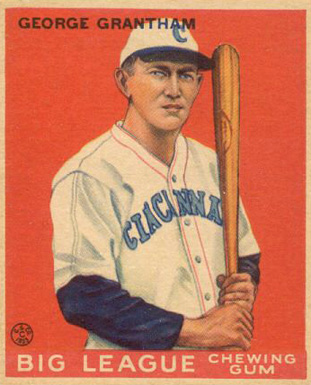
- 1933 Goudey baseball card of Grantham
- Second baseman / First baseman
- Born: May 20, 1900; Galena, Kansas, U.S.
- Died: March 16, 1954 (aged 53); Kingman, Arizona, U.S.
- Batted: Left Threw: Right

MLB debut
- September 20, 1922, for the Chicago Cubs

Last MLB appearance
- July 26, 1934, for the New York Giants

MLB statistics
- Batting average: .302
- Home runs: 105
- Runs batted in: 712
- Stats at Baseball Reference

Teams
- Chicago Cubs (1922–1924); Pittsburgh Pirates (1925–1931); Cincinnati Reds (1932–1933); New York Giants (1934)

Career highlights and awards
- World Series champion (1925)

George Farley "Boots" Grantham (May 20, 1900 – March 16, 1954) was an American Major League Baseball second baseman who played for the Chicago Cubs, Pittsburgh Pirates, Cincinnati Reds, and New York Giants between 1922 and 1934.

He attended Flagstaff High School and Northern Arizona University. After making his debut for the Cubs in the final week of the 1922 season, Grantham became their everyday second baseman in 1923, playing in a career-high 151 games and stealing 43 bases.

Grantham hit over .300 every season from 1924 to 1931. During the same span, his on-base percentage was .408. He was traded by the Cubs after the 1924 season to the Pirates in a six-player swap that sent future Hall of Famer Rabbit Maranville to Chicago, switching over to first base. With Pittsburgh, he appeared in the 1925 and 1927 World Series. He hit .364 in the '27 Series against what some consider the greatest Major League team of all time, the '27 Yankees.

In 1930 he hit .324, setting career highs in hits (179), RBIs (99), and runs scored (120).

In 1,444 career games over 13 seasons, Grantham posted a .302 batting average (1,508-for-4,989) with 912 runs, 292 doubles, 93 triples, 105 home runs, 712 RBI, 132 stolen bases, .392 on-base percentage and .461 slugging percentage. He finished his career with a .968 fielding percentage playing at first, second, third base and left field. In two World Series (1925 and '27) he batted .231 (6-for-26) with no runs or RBI.

== See also ==
- List of Major League Baseball career on-base percentage leaders
