= Charlie Hargreaves =

American baseball player (1896–1979)

- Catcher
- Born: December 14, 1896; Trenton, New Jersey, U.S.
- Died: May 9, 1979 (aged 82); Neptune, New Jersey, U.S.
- Batted: Right Threw: Right

MLB debut
- July 15, 1923, for the Brooklyn Robins

Last MLB appearance
- May 31, 1930, for the Pittsburgh Pirates

MLB statistics
- Batting average: .270
- Home runs: 4
- Runs batted in: 139
- Stats at Baseball Reference

Teams
- Brooklyn Robins (1923–1928); Pittsburgh Pirates (1928–1930)

Charles Russell Hargreaves (December 14, 1896 – May 9, 1979) was an American professional baseball player who played catcher from 1923 to 1930.

In 423 games over eight seasons, Hargreaves posted a .270 batting average (321-for-1188) with 96 runs, 4 home runs, 139 RBIs and 77 bases on balls. He recorded a .977 fielding percentage as a catcher.

From 1925 to 1928, Hargreaves was the head men's basketball coach at Middlebury College. He later managed the Keokuk Pirates in the Central Association in 1949.
