= 1928 Major League Baseball season =

1928 MLB season
- League: American League (AL); National League (NL)
- Sport: Baseball
- Duration: Regular season: April 10 – September 30, 1928; World Series: October 4–9, 1928
- Games: 154
- Teams: 16 (8 per league)

Regular Season
- Season MVP: AL: Mickey Cochrane (PHA); NL: Jim Bottomley (STL)
- AL champions: New York Yankees
- AL runners-up: Philadelphia Athletics
- NL champions: St. Louis Cardinals
- NL runners-up: New York Giants

World Series
- Champions: New York Yankees
- Runners-up: St. Louis Cardinals

MLB seasons
- ← 1927 1929 →

Locations of teams for the 1923–1931 American League seasons
American League
Locations of teams for the 1920–1931 National League seasons
National League

The 1928 major league baseball season began on April 10, 1928. The regular season ended on September 30, with the St. Louis Cardinals and New York Yankees as the regular season champions of the National League and American League, respectively. The postseason began with Game 1 of the 25th World Series on October 4 and ended with Game 4 on October 9. In the second iteration of this World Series matchup, the Yankees swept the Cardinals in four games, capturing their third championship in franchise history, and the fifth team to win back-to-back World Series.

This was the seventh of eight seasons that "League Awards", a precursor to the Major League Baseball Most Valuable Player Award (introduced in 1931), were issued.

== Schedule ==
The 1928 schedule consisted of 154 games for all teams in the American League and National League, each of which had eight teams. Each team was scheduled to play 22 games against the other seven teams of their respective league. This continued the format put in place since the 1904 season (except for 1919) and would be used until 1961 in the American League and 1962 in the National League.

American League Opening Day took place on April 10 with the Boston Red Sox and Washington Senators playing, while National League Opening Day took place the following day. The final day of the regular season was on September 30. The World Series took place between October 4 and October 9.

== Rule change ==
The 1928 season saw the following rule change:

- The National League reimplemented the early-1920 home run rule, which states that balls are to be called based on where the ball crosses the outfield fence regarding home runs. This rule was only for balls which landed in the stands. Balls which completely left the ballpark were to be judged based on where the ball flew out of sight. The American League would implement the outfield fence portion of the home run rule in 1931, and would extend this interpretation to balls which leave the ballpark completely.

== Teams ==
| League | Team | City | Ballpark | Capacity | Manager |
|---|---|---|---|---|---|
| American League | Boston Red Sox | Boston, Massachusetts | Fenway Park | 27,000 | Bill Carrigan |
| American League | Chicago White Sox | Chicago, Illinois | Comiskey Park | 52,000 | Ray Schalk |
| American League | Chicago White Sox | Chicago, Illinois | Comiskey Park | 52,000 | Lena Blackburne |
| American League | Cleveland Indians | Cleveland, Ohio | Dunn Field | 21,414 | Roger Peckinpaugh |
| American League | Detroit Tigers | Detroit, Michigan | Navin Field | 30,000 | George Moriarty |
| American League | New York Yankees | New York, New York | Yankee Stadium | 82,000 | Miller Huggins |
| American League | Philadelphia Athletics | Philadelphia, Pennsylvania | Shibe Park | 28,250 | Connie Mack |
| American League | St. Louis Browns | St. Louis, Missouri | Sportsman's Park | 34,023 | Dan Howley |
| American League | Washington Senators | Washington, D.C. | Griffith Stadium | 27,000 | Bucky Harris |
| National League | Boston Braves | Boston, Massachusetts | Braves Field | 46,500 | Jack Slattery |
| National League | Boston Braves | Boston, Massachusetts | Braves Field | 46,500 | Rogers Hornsby |
| National League | Brooklyn Robins | New York, New York | Ebbets Field | 28,000 | Wilbert Robinson |
| National League | Chicago Cubs | Chicago, Illinois | Wrigley Field | 40,000 | Joe McCarthy |
| National League | Cincinnati Reds | Cincinnati, Ohio | Redland Field | 26,060 | Jack Hendricks |
| National League | New York Giants | New York, New York | Polo Grounds | 55,000 | John McGraw |
| National League | Philadelphia Phillies | Philadelphia, Pennsylvania | Baker Bowl | 18,000 | Burt Shotton |
| National League | Pittsburgh Pirates | Pittsburgh, Pennsylvania | Forbes Field | 41,000 | Donie Bush |
| National League | St. Louis Cardinals | St. Louis, Missouri | Sportsman's Park | 34,023 | Bill McKechnie |

== Standings ==
=== American League ===
American League
| Team | W | L | Pct. | GB | Home | Road |
|---|---|---|---|---|---|---|
| New York Yankees | 101 | 53 | .656 | — | 52‍–‍25 | 49‍–‍28 |
| Philadelphia Athletics | 98 | 55 | .641 | 2½ | 52‍–‍25 | 46‍–‍30 |
| St. Louis Browns | 82 | 72 | .532 | 19 | 43‍–‍34 | 39‍–‍38 |
| Washington Senators | 75 | 79 | .487 | 26 | 37‍–‍43 | 38‍–‍36 |
| Chicago White Sox | 72 | 82 | .468 | 29 | 37‍–‍40 | 35‍–‍42 |
| Detroit Tigers | 68 | 86 | .442 | 33 | 36‍–‍41 | 32‍–‍45 |
| Cleveland Indians | 62 | 92 | .403 | 39 | 28‍–‍49 | 34‍–‍43 |
| Boston Red Sox | 57 | 96 | .373 | 43½ | 26‍–‍47 | 31‍–‍49 |

=== National League ===
National League
| Team | W | L | Pct. | GB | Home | Road |
|---|---|---|---|---|---|---|
| St. Louis Cardinals | 95 | 59 | .617 | — | 42‍–‍35 | 53‍–‍24 |
| New York Giants | 93 | 61 | .604 | 2 | 51‍–‍26 | 42‍–‍35 |
| Chicago Cubs | 91 | 63 | .591 | 4 | 52‍–‍25 | 39‍–‍38 |
| Pittsburgh Pirates | 85 | 67 | .559 | 9 | 47‍–‍30 | 38‍–‍37 |
| Cincinnati Reds | 78 | 74 | .513 | 16 | 44‍–‍33 | 34‍–‍41 |
| Brooklyn Robins | 77 | 76 | .503 | 17½ | 41‍–‍35 | 36‍–‍41 |
| Boston Braves | 50 | 103 | .327 | 44½ | 25‍–‍51 | 25‍–‍52 |
| Philadelphia Phillies | 43 | 109 | .283 | 51 | 26‍–‍49 | 17‍–‍60 |

=== Tie games ===
4 tie games (2 in AL, 2 in NL), which are not factored into winning percentage or games behind (and were often replayed again) occurred throughout the season.

==== American League ====
The Boston Red Sox, Chicago White Sox, Cleveland Indians, and Washington Senators had one tie game each.

- April 13, Cleveland Indians vs. Chicago White Sox, tied at 1 after a shortened game of six innings due to rain.
- April 14, Washington Senators vs. Boston Red Sox, scoreless tie after a shortened game of five innings due to rain.

==== National League ====
The Brooklyn Robins had two tie games. The Cincinnati Reds and New York Giants had one tie game each.

- May 30 (game 2), New York Giants vs. Brooklyn Robins, tied at 2 after a shortened game of six innings due to rain.
- July 12, Brooklyn Robins vs. Cincinnati Reds, scoreless tie after nine innings due to rain.

== Postseason ==
The postseason began on October 4 and ended on October 9 with the New York Yankees sweeping the St. Louis Cardinals in the 1928 World Series in four games.

=== Bracket ===
| World Series |
| AL | New York Yankees | 4 |
| NL | St. Louis Cardinals | 0 |

== Managerial changes ==
=== Off-season ===
| Team | Former Manager | New Manager |
|---|---|---|
| Boston Braves | Dave Bancroft | Jack Slattery |
| Cleveland Indians | Jack McCallister | Roger Peckinpaugh |
| Philadelphia Phillies | Stuffy McInnis | Burt Shotton |
| St. Louis Cardinals | Bob O'Farrell | Bill McKechnie |

=== In-season ===
| Team | Former Manager | New Manager |
|---|---|---|
| Boston Braves | Jack Slattery | Rogers Hornsby |
| Chicago White Sox | Ray Schalk | Lena Blackburne |

== League leaders ==
=== American League ===
Hitting leaders
| Stat | Player | Total |
|---|---|---|
| AVG | Goose Goslin (WSH) | .379 |
| OPS | Babe Ruth (NYY) | 1.172 |
| HR | Babe Ruth (NYY) | 54 |
| RBI | Lou Gehrig (NYY); Babe Ruth (NYY) | 142 |
| R | Babe Ruth (NYY) | 163 |
| H | Heinie Manush (SLB) | 241 |
| SB | Buddy Myer (BOS) | 30 |

Pitching leaders
| Stat | Player | Total |
|---|---|---|
| W | Lefty Grove (PHA); George Pipgras (NYY) | 24 |
| L | Red Ruffing (BOS) | 25 |
| ERA | Garland Braxton (WSH) | 2.51 |
| K | Lefty Grove (PHA) | 183 |
| IP | George Pipgras (NYY) | 300.2 |
| SV | Waite Hoyt (NYY) | 8 |
| WHIP | Garland Braxton (WSH) | 1.012 |

=== National League ===
Hitting leaders
| Stat | Player | Total |
|---|---|---|
| AVG | Rogers Hornsby (BSN) | .387 |
| OPS | Rogers Hornsby (BSN) | 1.130 |
| HR | Jim Bottomley (STL); Hack Wilson (CHC) | 31 |
| RBI | Jim Bottomley (STL) | 136 |
| R | Paul Waner (PIT) | 142 |
| H | Freddie Lindstrom (NYG) | 231 |
| SB | Kiki Cuyler (CHC) | 37 |

Pitching leaders
| Stat | Player | Total |
|---|---|---|
| W | Larry Benton (NYG); Burleigh Grimes (PIT) | 25 |
| L | Ed Brandt (BSN) | 21 |
| ERA | Dazzy Vance (BRO) | 2.09 |
| K | Dazzy Vance (BRO) | 200 |
| IP | Burleigh Grimes (PIT) | 330.2 |
| SV | Hal Haid (STL); Bill Sherdel (STL) | 5 |
| WHIP | Dazzy Vance (BRO) | 1.063 |

== Milestones ==
=== Batters ===
==== Cycles ====
- Bill Terry (NYG):
  - Terry hit for his first cycle and eighth in franchise history, on May 29 against the Brooklyn Robins.
- Bob Meusel (NYY):
  - Meusel hit for his third cycle and fourth in franchise history, in game one of a doubleheader on July 26 against the Detroit Tigers.

==== Other batting accomplishments ====
- Ty Cobb (PHA):
  - Became the first player in major league history to play in 3,000 games on June 26 against the Washington Senators.
  - When only counting the modern definition of a stolen base, defined in 1898, Cobb set a major league record of 897 career stolen bases in the first inning against the Boston Red Sox in game one of a doubleheader on July 4.

=== Miscellaneous ===
- New York Yankees:
  - Set a major league record for most runs scored in the 12th inning, by scoring 11 runs against the Detroit Tigers in game one of a doubleheader on July 26.
- Philadelphia Phillies:
  - Set the modern National League record for most losses in a season on September 30 with 109. The previous record of 108 was set by the Boston Doves in 1909.
  - Set the modern National League record for worst winning percentage with .283. The previous record of .291 was set by the Boston Rustlers in 1911.

== Awards and honors ==
- League Award: Jim Bottomley (STL, National); Mickey Cochrane (PHA, American)

== Home field attendance ==
| Team name | Wins | %± | Home attendance | %± | Per game |
|---|---|---|---|---|---|
| Chicago Cubs | 91 | 7.1% | 1,143,740 | −1.3% | 14,854 |
| New York Yankees | 101 | −8.2% | 1,072,132 | −7.9% | 13,924 |
| New York Giants | 93 | 1.1% | 916,191 | 6.8% | 11,899 |
| St. Louis Cardinals | 95 | 3.3% | 761,574 | 1.6% | 9,891 |
| Philadelphia Athletics | 98 | 7.7% | 689,756 | 13.9% | 8,958 |
| Brooklyn Robins | 77 | 18.5% | 664,863 | 4.3% | 8,635 |
| Pittsburgh Pirates | 85 | −9.6% | 495,070 | −43.1% | 6,429 |
| Chicago White Sox | 72 | 2.9% | 494,152 | −19.6% | 6,335 |
| Cincinnati Reds | 78 | 4.0% | 490,490 | 10.9% | 6,288 |
| Detroit Tigers | 68 | −17.1% | 474,323 | −38.7% | 6,160 |
| Boston Red Sox | 57 | 11.8% | 396,920 | 30.0% | 5,364 |
| Washington Senators | 75 | −11.8% | 378,501 | −28.4% | 4,731 |
| Cleveland Indians | 62 | −6.1% | 375,907 | 0.7% | 4,882 |
| St. Louis Browns | 82 | 39.0% | 339,497 | 37.0% | 4,409 |
| Boston Braves | 50 | −16.7% | 227,001 | −21.4% | 2,987 |
| Philadelphia Phillies | 43 | −15.7% | 182,168 | −40.4% | 2,429 |

== Venues ==
The Cleveland Indians' Dunn Field reverts to the name League Park, following the sale of the team by team owner Jim Dunn.

== See also ==
- 1928 in baseball (Events, Births, Deaths)
