= 1946 Chicago Cubs season =

1946 Chicago Cubs
- League: National League
- Ballpark: Wrigley Field
- City: Chicago
- Record: 82–71 (.536)
- League place: 3rd
- Owners: Philip K. Wrigley
- General managers: James T. Gallagher
- Managers: Charlie Grimm
- Television: WBKB (Jack Gibney)
- Radio: WIND (Bert Wilson)

The 1946 Chicago Cubs season was the 75th season of the Chicago Cubs franchise, the 71st in the National League and the 31st at Wrigley Field. The Cubs finished third in the National League with a record of 82–71.

== Offseason ==
- Prior to the 1946 season: Hal Jeffcoat was signed as an amateur free agent by the Cubs.

== Regular season ==
=== Season standings ===
National League
Team	W	L	Pct.	GB	Home	Road
St. Louis Cardinals	98	58	.628	—	49‍–‍29	49‍–‍29
Brooklyn Dodgers	96	60	.615	2	56‍–‍22	40‍–‍38
Chicago Cubs	82	71	.536	14½	44‍–‍33	38‍–‍38
Boston Braves	81	72	.529	15½	45‍–‍31	36‍–‍41
Philadelphia Phillies	69	85	.448	28	41‍–‍36	28‍–‍49
Cincinnati Reds	67	87	.435	30	35‍–‍42	32‍–‍45
Pittsburgh Pirates	63	91	.409	34	37‍–‍40	26‍–‍51
New York Giants	61	93	.396	36	38‍–‍39	23‍–‍54

=== Record vs. opponents ===
1946 National League record Sources:
Team	BSN	BRO	CHC	CIN	NYG	PHI	PIT	STL
Boston	—	5–17	12–9–1	15–7	13–9	14–8	15–7	7–15
Brooklyn	17–5	—	11–11	14–8–1	15–7	17–5	14–8	8–16
Chicago	9–12–1	11–11	—	13–9	17–5	12–10	12–10–1	8–14
Cincinnati	7–15	8–14–1	9–13	—	14–8	8–14–1	13–9	8–14
New York	9–13	7–15	5–17	8–14	—	12–10	10–12	10–12
Philadelphia	8–14	5–17	10–12	14–8–1	10–12	—	14–8	8–14
Pittsburgh	7–15	8–14	10–12–1	9–13	12–10	8–14	—	9–13
St. Louis	15–7	16–8	14–8	14–8	12–10	14–8	13–9	—

=== Notable transactions ===
- June 26, 1946: Heinz Becker was traded by the Cubs to the Cleveland Indians for Mickey Rocco and cash.

=== Roster ===
1946 Chicago Cubs
Roster
Pitchers: 18 Red Adams; 18 Russ Bauers; 25 Hi Bithorn; 26 Hank Borowy; 31 Bob Chipman; 37 Paul Erickson; 32 Bill Fleming; 34,49 Ed Hanyzewski; 29 Emil Kush; 19 Doyle Lade; 13 Hal Manders; 17 Russ Meers; 38 Russ Meyer; 19 Emmett O'Neill; 23 Vern Olsen; 13 Claude Passeau; 39 Ray Prim; 53 Johnny Schmitz; 33 Hank Wyse	Catchers: 11 Mickey Livingston; 8 Clyde McCullough; 32 Ted Pawelek; 10 Bob Scheffing; 6,20 Dewey Williams; Infielders: 34 Cy Block; 27 Al Glossop; 6 Stan Hack; 20 Don Johnson; 45 Billy Jurges; 21 Lennie Merullo; 27 Johnny Ostrowski; 17 Hank Schenz; 12 Lou Stringer; 7,38 Bobby Sturgeon; 36 Eddie Waitkus	Outfielders: 44 Phil Cavarretta; 46 Dom Dallessandro; 22 Charlie Gilbert; 47 Peanuts Lowrey; 54 Clarence Maddern; 43 Bill Nicholson; 48 Andy Pafko; 35 Marv Rickert; 49 Frank Secory; Other batters: 7 Heinz Becker; 22 Cecil Garriott	Manager: 40 Charlie Grimm; Coaches: 42 Roy Johnson; 52 Red Smith; 41 Milt Stock

== Player stats ==
=== Batting ===
==== Starters by position ====
Note: Pos = Position; G = Games played; AB = At bats; H = Hits; Avg. = Batting average; HR = Home runs; RBI = Runs batted in

Pos	Player	G	AB	H	Avg.	HR	RBI
C	Clyde McCullough	95	307	88	.287	4	34
1B	Eddie Waitkus	113	441	134	.304	4	55
2B	Don Johnson	83	314	76	.242	1	19
SS	Billy Jurges	82	221	49	.222	0	17
3B	Stan Hack	92	323	92	.285	0	26
OF	Peanuts Lowrey	144	540	139	.257	4	54
OF	Marv Rickert	111	392	103	.263	7	47
OF	Phil Cavarretta	139	510	150	.294	8	78

==== Other batters ====
Note: G = Games played; AB = At bats; H = Hits; Avg. = Batting average; HR = Home runs; RBI = Runs batted in

Player	G	AB	H	Avg.	HR	RBI
Bill Nicholson	105	296	65	.220	8	41
Bobby Sturgeon	100	294	87	.296	1	21
Andy Pafko	65	234	66	.282	3	39
Lou Stringer	80	209	51	.244	3	19
Mickey Livingston	66	176	45	.256	2	20
Johnny Ostrowski	64	160	34	.213	3	12
Lennie Merullo	65	126	19	.151	0	7
Bob Scheffing	63	115	32	.278	0	18
Dom Dallessandro	65	89	20	.225	1	9
Frank Secory	33	43	10	.233	3	12
Cy Block	6	13	3	.231	0	0
Charlie Gilbert	15	13	1	.077	0	1
Hank Schenz	6	11	2	.182	0	1
Al Glossop	4	10	0	.000	0	0
Heinz Becker	9	7	2	.286	0	1
Cecil Garriott	6	5	0	.000	0	0
Dewey Williams	4	5	1	.200	0	0
Ted Pawelek	4	4	1	.250	0	0
Clarence Maddern	3	3	0	.000	0	0

=== Pitching ===
==== Starting pitchers ====
Note: G = Games pitched; IP = Innings pitched; W = Wins; L = Losses; ERA = Earned run average; SO = Strikeouts

Player	G	IP	W	L	ERA	SO
Johnny Schmitz	41	224.1	11	11	2.61	135
Hank Wyse	40	201.1	14	12	2.68	52
Hank Borowy	32	201.0	12	10	3.76	95
Claude Passeau	21	129.1	9	8	3.13	47

==== Other pitchers ====
Note: G = Games pitched; IP = Innings pitched; W = Wins; L = Losses; ERA = Earned run average; SO = Strikeouts

Player	G	IP	W	L	ERA	SO
Paul Erickson	32	137.0	9	7	2.43	70
Emil Kush	40	129.2	9	2	3.05	50
Bob Chipman	34	109.1	6	5	3.13	42
Hi Bithorn	26	86.2	6	5	3.84	34
Russ Meyer	4	17.0	0	0	3.18	10
Doyle Lade	3	15.1	0	2	4.11	8
Russ Meers	7	11.1	1	2	3.18	2
Hal Manders	2	6.0	0	1	9.00	4

==== Relief pitchers ====
Note: G = Games pitched; W = Wins; L = Losses; SV = Saves; ERA = Earned run average; SO = Strikeouts

Player	G	W	L	SV	ERA	SO
Russ Bauers	15	2	1	1	3.53	22
Bill Fleming	14	0	1	0	6.14	10
Ray Prim	14	2	3	1	5.79	10
Red Adams	8	0	1	0	8.25	8
Vern Olsen	5	0	0	0	2.79	8
Ed Hanyzewski	3	1	0	0	4.50	1
Emmett O'Neill	1	0	0	0	0.00	1

== Farm system ==
Level	Team	League	Manager
AAA	Los Angeles Angels	Pacific Coast League	Bill Sweeney
AA	Nashville Vols	Southern Association	Larry Gilbert
AA	Tulsa Oilers	Texas League	Gus Mancuso
A	Macon Peaches	Sally League	Al Leitz and Bobby LaMotte
B	Davenport Cubs	Illinois–Indiana–Iowa League	Bill Kelly
B	Hagerstown Owls	Interstate League	Bunny Griffiths
B	Portsmouth Cubs	Piedmont League	Gene Hasson and Ace Parker
B	Shelby Cubs	Tri-State League	Clyde McDowell
B	Tacoma Tigers	Western International League	Red Harvel
C	Visalia Cubs	California League	Bobby Schang and Pete Beiden
C	Quebec Alouettes	Canadian–American League	Joe Sugrue, Tim Murchison and John Intlekofer
C	Hutchinson Cubs	Western Association	Dickey Kerr
D	Elizabethton Betsy Cubs	Appalachian League	Lou Bekeza
D	Fayetteville Cubs	Coastal Plain League	John Intlekofer and Donald Anderson
D	Iola Cubs	Kansas–Oklahoma–Missouri League	Al Reitz
D	Hopkinsville Hoppers	KITTY League	Calvin Chapman
D	Statesville Cubs	North Carolina State League	Halley Wilson
D	Janesville Bears	Wisconsin State League	Quinto Valentino

LEAGUE CHAMPIONS: Hutchinson; LEAGUE CO-CHAMPIONS: Iola
