= 1945 Chicago Cubs season =

1945 Chicago Cubs
- National League champions
- League: National League
- Ballpark: Wrigley Field
- City: Chicago
- Record: 98–56 (.636)
- League place: 1st
- Owners: Philip K. Wrigley
- General managers: James T. Gallagher
- Managers: Charlie Grimm
- Radio: WIND (Bert Wilson, Wayne Osborne)

The 1945 Chicago Cubs season was the 74th season of the Chicago Cubs franchise, the 70th in the National League and the 30th at Wrigley Field. The Cubs won the National League pennant with a record of 98–56, 3 games ahead of the second-place St. Louis Cardinals. The team went on to the World Series, which they lost to the Detroit Tigers in seven games. This was the Cubs last postseason appearance until 1984. It would take 71 years before the Cubs made it to another World Series.

== Regular season ==
=== Season standings ===
National League
Team	W	L	Pct.	GB	Home	Road
Chicago Cubs	98	56	.636	—	49‍–‍26	49‍–‍30
St. Louis Cardinals	95	59	.617	3	48‍–‍29	47‍–‍30
Brooklyn Dodgers	87	67	.565	11	48‍–‍30	39‍–‍37
Pittsburgh Pirates	82	72	.532	16	45‍–‍34	37‍–‍38
New York Giants	78	74	.513	19	47‍–‍30	31‍–‍44
Boston Braves	67	85	.441	30	36‍–‍38	31‍–‍47
Cincinnati Reds	61	93	.396	37	36‍–‍41	25‍–‍52
Philadelphia Phillies	46	108	.299	52	22‍–‍55	24‍–‍53

=== Record vs. opponents ===
1945 National League record Sources:
Team	BSN	BRO	CHC	CIN	NYG	PHI	PIT	STL
Boston	—	9–13–1	7–15	10–12	10–10–2	14–8	7–15	10–12
Brooklyn	13–9–1	—	8–14–1	11–11	15–7	19–3	12–10	9–13
Chicago	15–7	14–8–1	—	21–1	11–11	17–5	14–8	6–16
Cincinnati	12–10	11–11	1–21	—	6–16	12–10	10–12	9–13
New York	10–10–2	7–15	11–11	16–6	—	17–5	11–11	6–16
Philadelphia	8–14	3–19	5–17	10–12	5–17	—	6–16	9–13
Pittsburgh	15–7	10–12	8–14	12–10	11–11	16–6	—	10–12–1
St. Louis	12–10	13–9	16–6	13–9	16–6	13–9	12–10–1	—

=== Roster ===
1945 Chicago Cubs
Roster
Pitchers: 26 Hank Borowy; 31 Bob Chipman; 36 Jorge Comellas; 30 Paul Derringer; 37 Paul Erickson; 34 Ed Hanyzewski; 27 George Hennessey; 13 Claude Passeau; 39 Ray Prim; 27 Walter Signer; 32,38 Ray Starr; 38 Mack Stewart; 35 Hy Vandenberg; 36 Lon Warneke; 33 Hank Wyse	Catchers: 10 Paul Gillespie; 11 Mickey Livingston; 8 Len Rice; 12 Dewey Williams; Infielders: 7 Heinz Becker; 53 Cy Block; 44 Phil Cavarretta; 6 Stan Hack; 23 Roy Hughes; 20 Pep Johnson; 21 Lennie Merullo; 50 Johnny Ostrowski; 51 Reggie Otero; 22 Bill Schuster	Outfielders: 32 Loyd Christopher; 47 Peanuts Lowrey; 43 Bill Nicholson; 48 Andy Pafko; 45 Ed Sauer; 49 Frank Secory; Other batters: 5 Johnny Moore	Manager: 40 Charlie Grimm; Coaches: 42 Roy Johnson; 52 Red Smith; 41 Milt Stock

== Player stats ==
=== Batting ===
==== Starters by position ====
Note: Pos = Position; G = Games played; AB = At bats; H = Hits; Avg. = Batting average; HR = Home runs; RBI = Runs batted in

Pos	Player	G	AB	H	Avg.	HR	RBI
C	Mickey Livingston	71	224	57	.254	2	23
1B	Phil Cavarretta	132	498	177	.355	6	97
2B	Don Johnson	138	557	168	.302	2	58
SS	Lennie Merullo	121	394	94	.239	2	37
3B	Stan Hack	150	597	193	.323	2	43
OF	Peanuts Lowrey	143	523	148	.283	7	89
OF	Andy Pafko	144	534	159	.298	12	110
OF	Bill Nicholson	151	559	136	.243	13	88

==== Other batters ====
Note: G = Games played; AB = At bats; H = Hits; Avg. = Batting average; HR = Home runs; RBI = Runs batted in

Player	G	AB	H	Avg.	HR	RBI
Roy Hughes	69	222	58	.261	0	8
Paul Gillespie	75	163	47	.288	3	25
Heinz Becker	67	133	38	.286	2	27
Dewey Williams	59	100	28	.280	2	5
Len Rice	32	99	23	.232	0	7
Ed Sauer	49	93	24	.258	2	11
Frank Secory	35	57	9	.158	0	6
Bill Schuster	45	47	9	.191	0	2
Reggie Otero	14	23	9	.391	0	5
Johnny Ostrowski	7	10	3	.300	0	1
Cy Block	2	7	1	.143	0	1
Johnny Moore	7	6	1	.167	0	2
Loyd Christopher	1	0	0	----	0	0

=== Pitching ===
==== Starting pitchers ====
Note: G = Games pitched; IP = Innings pitched; W = Wins; L = Losses; ERA = Earned run average; SO = Strikeouts

Player	G	IP	W	L	ERA	SO
Hank Wyse	38	278.1	22	10	2.68	77
Claude Passeau	34	227.0	17	9	2.46	98
Paul Derringer	35	213.2	16	11	3.45	86
Ray Prim	34	165.1	13	8	2.40	88
Hank Borowy	15	122.1	11	2	2.13	47

==== Other pitchers ====
Note: G = Games pitched; IP = Innings pitched; W = Wins; L = Losses; ERA = Earned run average; SO = Strikeouts

Player	G	IP	W	L	ERA	SO
Hy Vandenberg	30	95.1	7	3	3.49	35
Bob Chipman	25	72.0	4	5	3.50	29
Lon Warneke	9	14.0	0	1	3.86	6
Ray Starr	9	13.1	0	0	7.43	5
Jorge Comellas	7	12.0	0	2	4.50	6
Ed Hanyzewski	2	4.2	0	0	5.79	2

==== Relief pitchers ====
Note: G = Games pitched; W = Wins; L = Losses; SV = Saves; ERA = Earned run average; SO = Strikeouts

Player	G	W	L	SV	ERA	SO
Paul Erickson	28	7	4	3	3.32	53
Mack Stewart	16	0	1	0	4.76	9
Walter Signer	6	0	0	1	3.38	0
George Hennessey	2	0	0	0	7.36	2

== 1945 World Series ==
=== The Curse of Billy "The Goat" Sianis ===
The Curse of the Billy Goat was a curse on the Chicago Cubs that was started in 1945 and ended in 2016. As the story goes, Billy Sianis, a Greek immigrant (from Paleopyrgos, Greece), who owned a nearby tavern (the now-famous Billy Goat Tavern), had two $7.20 box seat tickets to Game 4 of the 1945 World Series between the Chicago Cubs and the Detroit Tigers, and decided to bring along his pet goat, Murphy (or Sinovia according to some references), which Sianis had restored to health when the goat had fallen off a truck and subsequently limped into his tavern. The goat wore a blanket with a sign pinned to it which read "We got Detroit's goat". Sianis and the goat were allowed into Wrigley Field and even paraded about on the playing field before the game before ushers intervened and led them off the field. After a heated argument, both Sianis and the goat were permitted to stay in the stadium occupying the box seat for which he had tickets. At this point, Andy Frain (head of Wrigley Field's hired security company at the time), waved the goat's box-seat ticket in the air and proclaimed, "If he eats the ticket that would solve everything." However, the goat did not. Before the game was over, it started to rain and Sianis and the goat were ejected from the stadium at the command of Cubs owner Philip Knight Wrigley due to the objectionable odor of wet goat. Sianis was outraged at the ejection and allegedly placed a curse upon the Cubs that they would never win another pennant or play in a World Series at Wrigley Field again because the Cubs organization had insulted his goat, and subsequently left the U.S. to vacation in his home in Greece. The Cubs lost Game 4 and eventually the 1945 World Series, prompting Sianis to write to Wrigley from Greece, saying, "Who stinks now?" The Cubs would eventually break the curse and what would turn out to be a 108-year drought by winning the World Series in 2016 over the Cleveland Indians in seven games.

=== Game 1 ===
October 3, 1945, at Briggs Stadium in Detroit

Team	1	2	3	4	5	6	7	8	9	R	H	E
Chicago	4	0	3	0	0	0	2	0	0	9	13	0
Detroit	0	0	0	0	0	0	0	0	0	0	6	0
WP: Hank Borowy (1–0) LP: Hal Newhouser (0–1); Home runs: CHI: Phil Cavarretta (1); DET: None

=== Game 2 ===
October 4, 1945, at Briggs Stadium in Detroit

Team	1	2	3	4	5	6	7	8	9	R	H	E
Chicago	0	0	0	1	0	0	0	0	0	1	7	0
Detroit	0	0	0	0	4	0	0	0	0	4	7	0
WP: Virgil Trucks (1–0) LP: Hank Wyse (0–1); Home runs: CHI: None; DET: Hank Greenberg (1)

=== Game 3 ===
October 5, 1945, at Briggs Stadium in Detroit

Team	1	2	3	4	5	6	7	8	9	R	H	E
Chicago	0	0	0	2	0	0	1	0	0	3	8	0
Detroit	0	0	0	0	0	0	0	0	0	0	1	2
WP: Claude Passeau (1–0) LP: Stubby Overmire (0–1)

=== Game 4 ===
October 6, 1945, at Wrigley Field in Chicago

Team	1	2	3	4	5	6	7	8	9	R	H	E
Detroit	0	0	0	4	0	0	0	0	0	4	7	1
Chicago	0	0	0	0	0	1	0	0	0	1	5	1
WP: Dizzy Trout (1–0) LP: Ray Prim (0–1)

=== Game 5 ===
October 7, 1945, at Wrigley Field in Chicago

Team	1	2	3	4	5	6	7	8	9	R	H	E
Detroit	0	0	1	0	0	4	1	0	2	8	11	0
Chicago	0	0	1	0	0	0	2	0	1	4	7	2
WP: Hal Newhouser (1–1) LP: Hank Borowy (1–1)

=== Game 6 ===
October 8, 1945, at Wrigley Field in Chicago

Team	1	2	3	4	5	6	7	8	9	10	11	12	R	H	E
Detroit	0	1	0	0	0	0	2	4	0	0	0	0	7	13	1
Chicago	0	0	0	0	4	1	2	0	0	0	0	1	8	15	3
WP: Hank Borowy (2–1) LP: Dizzy Trout (1–1); Home runs: DET: Hank Greenberg (2); CHI: None

=== Game 7 ===
October 10, 1945, at Wrigley Field in Chicago

Team	1	2	3	4	5	6	7	8	9	R	H	E
Detroit	5	1	0	0	0	0	1	2	0	9	9	1
Chicago	1	0	0	1	0	0	0	1	0	3	10	0
WP: Hal Newhouser (2–1) LP: Hank Borowy (2–2)

== Farm system ==
Level	Team	League	Manager
AA	Los Angeles Angels	Pacific Coast League	Bill Sweeney
A1	Nashville Vols	Southern Association	Larry Gilbert
B	Hagerstown Owls	Interstate League	Mickey Balla and Dutch Dorman
B	Portsmouth Cubs	Piedmont League	Ival Goodman
C	Leaksville-Draper-Spray Triplets	Carolina League	Jack Warner
D	Elizabethton Betsy Cubs	Appalachian League	Bill Kelly
D	Statesville Cubs	North Carolina State League	Jim Poole
