= Dewey Williams =

American baseball player (1916–2000)

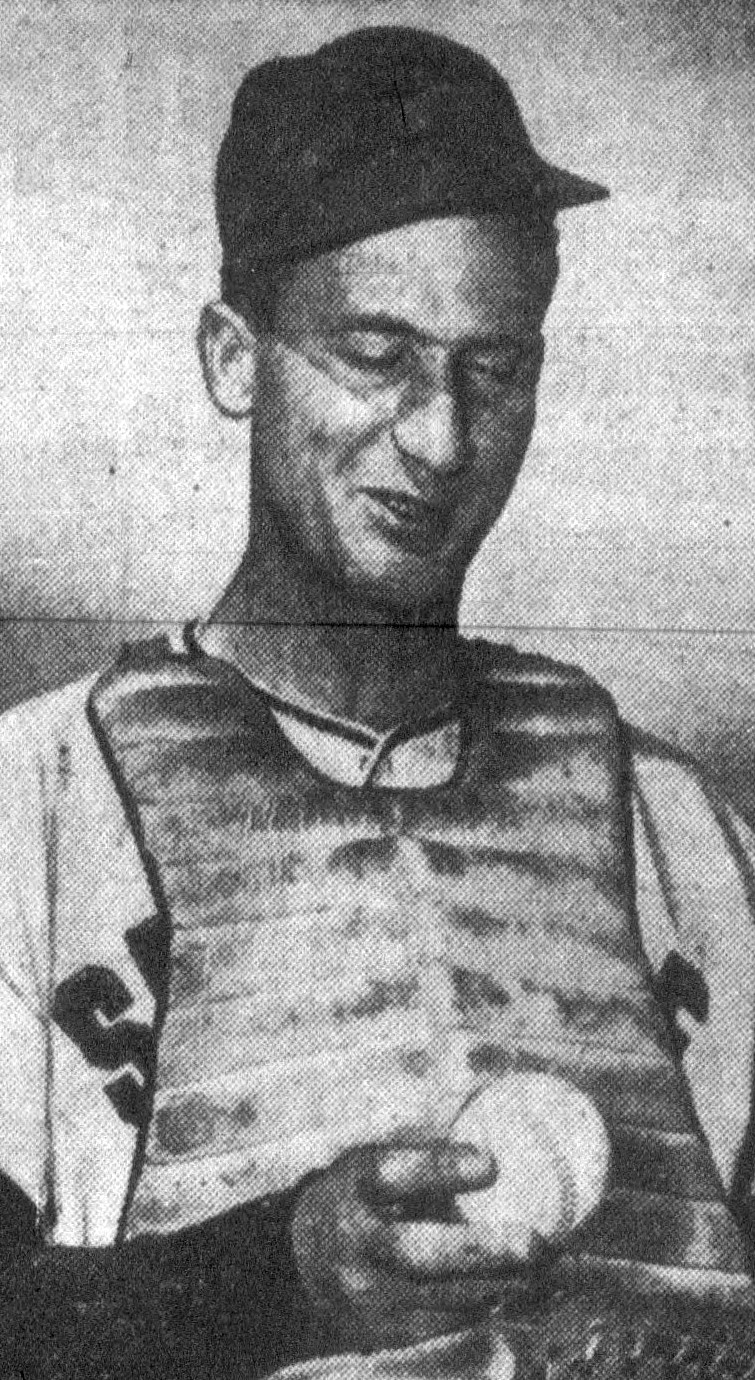
- Williams with the Seattle Rainiers, circa 1950
- Catcher
- Born: February 5, 1916; Durham, North Carolina, U.S.
- Died: March 19, 2000 (aged 84); Williston, North Dakota, U.S.
- Batted: Right Threw: Right

MLB debut
- June 28, 1944, for the Chicago Cubs

Last MLB appearance
- September 26, 1948, for the Cincinnati Reds

MLB statistics
- Batting average: .233
- Home runs: 3
- Runs batted in: 37
- Stats at Baseball Reference

Teams
- Chicago Cubs (1944–1947); Cincinnati Reds (1948)

Dewey Edgar Williams (February 5, 1916 – March 19, 2000), nicknamed "Dee", was an American professional baseball player. A catcher, he appeared in 193 games played in the Major Leagues between 1944 and 1948, and was a member of the 1945 Chicago Cubs, until 2016 the most recent Cub team to win a National League pennant.

Williams was a native of Durham, North Carolina. He threw and batted right-handed, stood 6 feet (1.8 m) tall and weighed 160 pounds (73 kg), a slender frame for a catcher.

== Career ==
His professional career lasted for 18 seasons, however (1937–54). In June 1944, he was acquired by the Cubs after he batted .313 in 48 games for the Toronto Maple Leafs of the top-level International League. During his rookie 1944 campaign, Williams appeared in an MLB-career-high 79 games (77 as a catcher), and batted .240 with 27 runs batted in.

In 1945, the following season, Williams was the Cubbies' third-string catcher (behind Mickey Livingston and Paul Gillespie); nevertheless, he appeared in 59 games and slugged two of his three career MLB home runs that season. He remained on the Cub roster for the 1945 World Series and played in two games. As a pinch hitter in Game 5, Williams struck out against Detroit Tigers' ace left-hander Hal Newhouser. He was a defensive replacement in Game 6, catching the last three innings, grounding out in his only at bat (against Dizzy Trout), and handling two chances without an error. The Cubs split the two games in which Williams played, but the Tigers prevailed in seven games to win the 1945 world championship.

He later spent time in the minor leagues, catching for the Seattle Rainiers in the Pacific Coast League (PCL) in the late 1940s and early 1950s.
