= Ted Pawelek =

American baseball player (1919–1964)

- Catcher
- Born: August 15, 1919; Chicago Heights, Illinois, U.S.
- Died: February 12, 1964 (aged 44); Chicago Heights, Illinois, U.S.
- Batted: Left Threw: Right

MLB debut
- September 13, 1946, for the Chicago Cubs

Last MLB appearance
- September 26, 1946, for the Chicago Cubs

MLB statistics
- Batting average: .250
- Home runs: 0
- Runs batted in: 0
- Stats at Baseball Reference

Teams
- Chicago Cubs (1946)

Theodore John Pawelek (August 15, 1919 – February 12, 1964) nicknamed "Porky", was an American professional baseball player, who played in four games in Major League Baseball as a catcher and pinch hitter for the 1946 Chicago Cubs. Pawelek batted left-handed, threw right-handed, and was listed as 5 feet 10 inches (1.78 m) tall and 202 pounds (92 kg). He was born in Chicago Heights, Illinois.

For his brief MLB career, he compiled a .250 batting average in four at-bats. Pawelek had spent 1946 with the Nashville Vols of the Double-A Southern Association, batting .335 with 107 hits and 15 home runs playing his home games in the Vols' hitter-friendly ballpark, Sulphur Dell. In his September trial, he was hitless in his first three appearances for the Cubs, but on September 26, 1946, in what would be his last big-league at bat, he doubled off the Pittsburgh Pirates' Jack Hallett in a 5–3 Chicago victory.

During his 11-season minor league career (1939–1941 and 1946–1953), he played for the Anniston Rams, Hot Springs Bathers, Tulsa Oilers, Nashville Vols, Los Angeles Angels, Portsmouth Cubs, Reidsville Luckies, Lakeland Pilots, Oklahoma City Indians, and Pampa Oilers. His career was interrupted from 1942 to 1945 when Pawelek served with the United States Marines during World War II.

He died in Chicago Heights in an automobile accident at the age of 44. Pawelek was a Detroit Tigers scout at the time of his death.
