= Lou Stringer =

American baseball player (1917–2008)

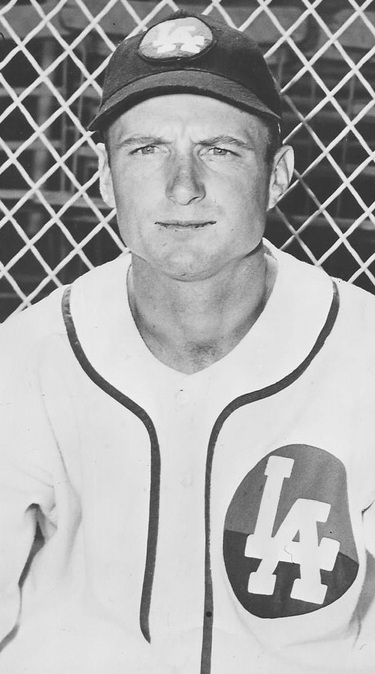
- Second baseman
- Born: May 13, 1917; Grand Rapids, Michigan, U.S.
- Died: October 19, 2008 (aged 91); Lake Forest, California, U.S.
- Batted: Right Threw: Right

MLB debut
- April 15, 1941, for the Chicago Cubs

Last MLB appearance
- September 23, 1950, for the Boston Red Sox

MLB statistics
- Batting average: .242
- Home runs: 19
- Runs batted in: 122
- Stats at Baseball Reference

Teams
- Chicago Cubs (1941–1942; 1946); Boston Red Sox (1948–1950)

Louis Bernard Stringer (May 13, 1917 – October 19, 2008) was an American second baseman in Major League Baseball who played for the Chicago Cubs and Boston Red Sox between the 1941 and 1950 seasons. Listed at 5 feet 11 inches (1.80 m) tall and 173 pounds (78 kg), Stringer batted and threw right-handed. He was born in Grand Rapids, Michigan, and raised in East Los Angeles, California.

== Biography ==
Stringer was one of many major leaguers who saw his baseball career interrupted by World War II. In his case, he served a stint in the United States Army Air Forces and missed three seasons (1943–1945).

He entered the Majors with the Cubs, playing for them three years (1941–42, 1946) before joining the Red Sox (1948–50). His most productive season came in his rookie year, when he posted career-numbers in games (145), hits (126), runs (59), extra bases (40) and runs batted in (53), while hitting .246 with a .324 on-base percentage. In 1942 he hit .241 with 41 RBI and a career-high nine home runs in 121 games. Injuries shortened his career after that, being replaced by Don Johnson in the Cubs infield. He also appeared in 63 games in parts of three seasons for the Red Sox.

In a six-season career, Stringer was a .242 hitter (290–for–1,196) with 19 home runs and 122 RBI in 409 games, including 148 runs, 49 doubles, 10 triples and seven stolen bases.

Stringer's minor league baseball career lasted for all or parts of 13 years between 1937 and 1957, and included a brief stint as acting manager of the Hollywood Stars of the Pacific Coast League in 1948. He died in Lake Forest, California, at the age of 91.
