= Dom Dallessandro =

American baseball player (1913–1988)

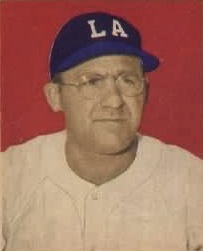
- Dallessandro's 1949 Bowman Gum baseball card, during his tenure with the PCL Los Angeles Angels
- Left fielder
- Born: October 3, 1913; Reading, Pennsylvania, U.S.
- Died: April 29, 1988 (aged 74); Indianapolis, Indiana, U.S.
- Batted: Left Threw: Left

MLB debut
- April 24, 1937, for the Boston Red Sox

Last MLB appearance
- September 24, 1947, for the Chicago Cubs

MLB statistics
- Batting average: .267
- Home runs: 22
- Runs batted in: 303
- Stats at Baseball Reference

Teams
- Boston Red Sox (1937); Chicago Cubs (1940–1944, 1946–1947)

Nicholas Dominic Dallessandro (October 3, 1913 – April 29, 1988) was an American outfielder in Major League Baseball who played for two teams between 1937 and 1947. Listed at 5 ft 6 in (1.68 m), 168 lb., Dallessandro batted and threw left-handed. He was born in Reading, Pennsylvania.

Dallessandro entered the majors in 1937 with the Boston Red Sox, playing for them one year before joining the Chicago Cubs in 1940. His most productive season came in 1941 with Chicago, when he hit .272 with six home runs and posted career-highs in games (140), hits (132), runs (73) and RBI (85), while his 36 doubles ranked him 4th in the National League. He enjoyed another solid season in 1944, hitting a career-high .304 with eight home runs and 74 RBI in 117 games. He missed 1945 due to military service during World War II and rejoined the Cubs in 1946, playing for them in part of the next two seasons. After his big league career ended, he saw action in the minor leagues until retiring in 1952.

In an eight-season career, Dallessandro was a .267 hitter (520-for-1945) with 22 home runs and 303 RBI in 746 games, including 242 runs, 11 doubles, 23 triples, 16 stolen bases, and a .369 on-base percentage. A disciplined hitter, he compiled a 2.07 walk-to-strikeout ratio (310-to-150). Defensively, he recorded a .980 fielding percentage playing at all three outfield positions.

Known by the alliterative but uncomplimentary nickname "Dim Dom" and also as "Mr. 5-by-5", short of stature, he was referenced in Chicago columnist Mike Royko's annual Cubs quiz on April 18, 1968:

Q: Which of these two players always had sore feet? Heinz Becker or the immortal Dominic Dallessandro?
A: Becker had sore feet. Dallessandro had tiny feet. It used to take him twenty jumps to get out of the dugout.

Dallessandro's nephew Dick Gernert also played in the major leagues.

Dallessandro died in Indianapolis, Indiana at the age of 74.
