= Ed Hanyzewski =

American baseball player (1920–1991)

- Pitcher
- Born: September 18, 1920; Union Mills, Indiana, U.S.
- Died: October 8, 1991 (aged 71); Fargo, North Dakota, U.S.
- Batted: Right Threw: Right

MLB debut
- May 12, 1942, for the Chicago Cubs

Last MLB appearance
- September 26, 1946, for the Chicago Cubs

MLB statistics
- Win–loss record: 12–13
- Earned run average: 3.30
- Strikeouts: 81
- Stats at Baseball Reference

Teams
- Chicago Cubs (1942–1946)

Edward Michael Hanyzewski (September 18, 1920 – October 8, 1991) was an American professional baseball player, a right-handed pitcher who worked in 58 games (25 as a starting pitcher) in the Major Leagues between 1942 and 1946 for the Chicago Cubs. Born to Polish immigrants Franciszka “Frances” (née Klodzinski) and Louis Hanyzewski, he threw and batted right-handed, stood 6 feet 1 inch (1.85 m) tall and weighed 200 pounds (91 kg) and attended the University of Notre Dame.

Hanyzewski's best Major League season came in 1943, when he appeared in 33 games (16 as a starter), won eight of 15 decisions, and fashioned a 2.56 earned run average in 130 innings pitched with three complete games.

Hanyzewski pitched in only two games (one in April and one in September) for the 1945 Cubs, who won the National League pennant, and did not appear in the 1945 World Series.

During his MLB career, Hanyzewski allowed 213 hits and 79 bases on balls in 218 innings pitched, with 81 strikeouts. He did not record a save.
