= Walter Signer =

American baseball player (1910–1974)

- Pitcher
- Born: October 12, 1910; New York City, New York, U.S.
- Died: July 23, 1974 (aged 63); Greenwich, Connecticut, U.S.
- Batted: Right Threw: Right

MLB debut
- September 18, 1943, for the Chicago Cubs

Last MLB appearance
- July 22, 1945, for the Chicago Cubs

MLB statistics
- Win–loss record: 2–1
- Earned run average: 3.00
- Strikeouts: 5
- Stats at Baseball Reference

Teams
- Chicago Cubs (1943, 1945)

Walter Donald Aloysius Signer (October 12, 1910 – July 23, 1974) was an American Major League Baseball pitcher who played for the Chicago Cubs in 1943 and 1945. The 6 ft 0 in (1.83 m), 185 lb (84 kg) right-hander was a native of New York City.

Signer is one of many ballplayers who only appeared in the major leagues during World War II. He made his major league debut on September 18, 1943, starting the second game of a doubleheader against the St. Louis Cardinals at Sportsman's Park. Signer and the Cubs were shut out 5–0 by 29-year-old rookie Al Brazle.

Signer's first major league win came as a relief pitcher in an 8–7 victory over the Philadelphia Blue Jays at Wrigley Field (September 23, 1943). His best game as a big leaguer was on October 1, 1943, when he pitched a complete game 3–1 win at home vs. the Boston Braves.

Two years later, in 1945, Signer pitched six games in relief for the Cubs with no starts. His career totals include 10 games pitched, 2 starts, a complete game, a 2–1 record with 3 games finished, a save, 11 earned runs allowed in 33 innings, and an earned run average of 3.00.

Signer died at the age of 63 in Greenwich, Connecticut.
