= Lennie Merullo =

American baseball player (1917–2015)

- Shortstop
- Born: May 5, 1917; East Boston, Massachusetts, U.S.
- Died: May 30, 2015 (aged 98); Reading, Massachusetts, U.S.
- Batted: Right Threw: Right

MLB debut
- September 12, 1941, for the Chicago Cubs

Last MLB appearance
- August 22, 1947, for the Chicago Cubs

MLB statistics
- Batting average: .240
- Hits: 497
- Home runs: 6
- Runs batted in: 152
- Stats at Baseball Reference

Teams
- Chicago Cubs (1941–1947)

Career highlights and awards
- Appeared in three games for Cubs in 1945 World Series

Leonard Richard Merullo (May 5, 1917 – May 30, 2015) was an American Major League Baseball (MLB) shortstop who played for the Chicago Cubs from 1941 to 1947, and scouted for MLB from 1950 to 2003.

== Chicago Cubs ==
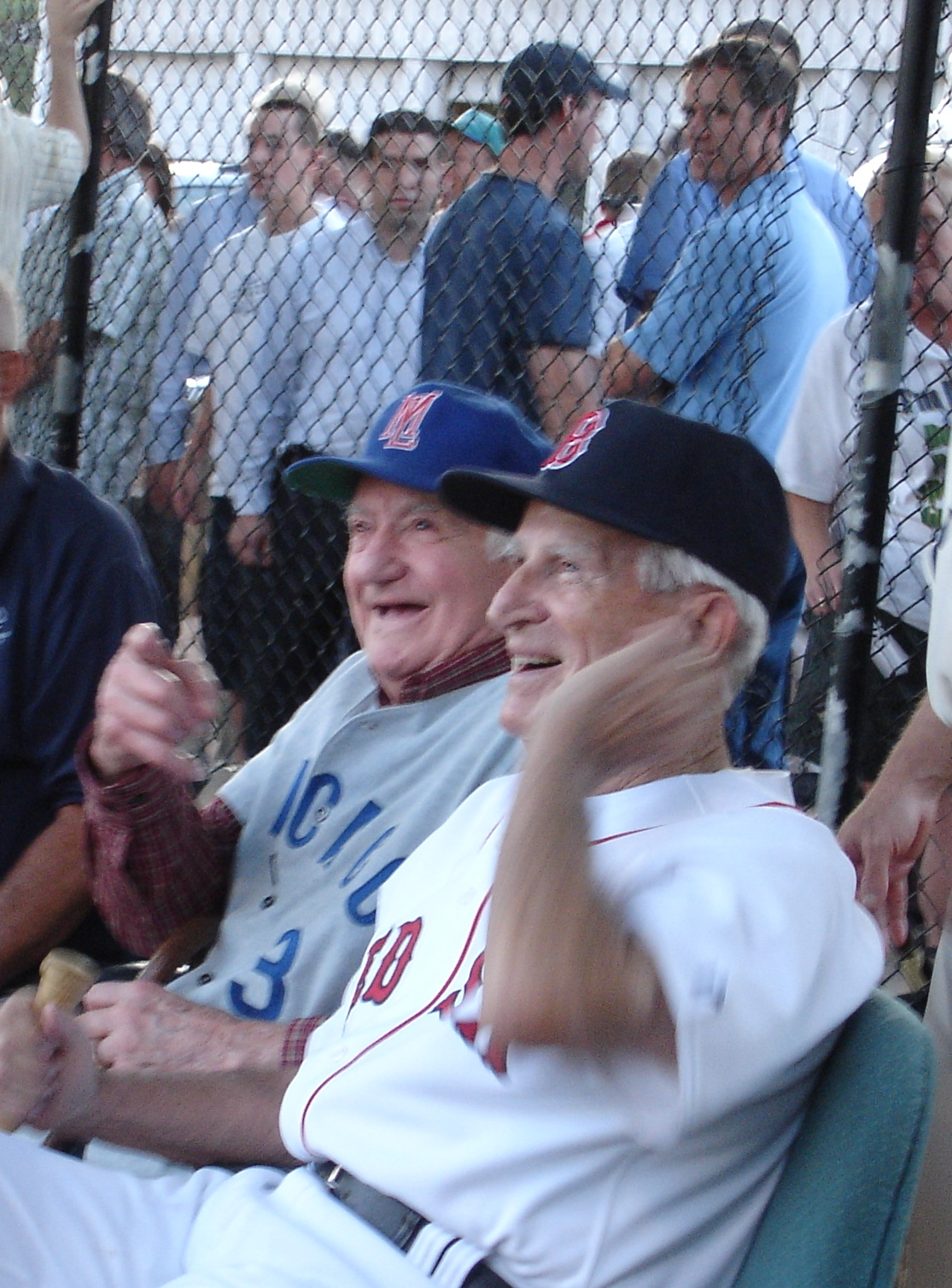
Merullo (left) with Johnny Pesky, 2008

A native of East Boston, Massachusetts, Merullo played shortstop for the Chicago Cubs for seven years in the major leagues in the 1940s. He appeared in three games during the 1945 World Series against two-time MVP Hal Newhouser, pitchers Virgil Trucks, Tommy Bridges, and slugger Hank Greenberg of the Detroit Tigers, who defeated the Cubs in seven games in the Series, the last one the Cubs played in until 2016. With the death of Andy Pafko on October 8, 2013, Merullo was the last surviving member of the 1945 team, as well as being the oldest living former member of the Cubs. Merullo's major league career began in 1941, and in 1942-45 he won the shortstop job, with Stan Hack playing third base and Merullo's roommate, Phil Cavarretta, at first. In 1946, Billy Jurges, Bobby Sturgeon and Merullo shared the shortstop position until Merullo regained the position in 1947. During this period, Merullo was known to have the quickest throwing arm in baseball. Merullo's time with the Cubs caused him, in later years, to be a frequent subject of Chicago columnist Mike Royko's annual Cub Quiz.

== Scout ==
After retiring from professional baseball, Merullo was chief scout for the Cubs from 1950–72, signing, among others, relief pitcher Moe Drabowsky. He left the Cubs in 1973 to join the then-fledgling Major League Baseball Scouting Bureau, where he served until his retirement at the age of 85 in 2003.

== Personal life ==
Merullo had four sons, the eldest is nicknamed "Boots" because Merullo famously made four errors in a single inning, on September 13, 1942, having been informed by the club's owner, Philip Wrigley, that his wife had just delivered. The following day the Chicago newspapers suggested his newborn baby should be called "Boots" in honor of the occasion.

Boots went on to play in the Pittsburgh Pirates' minor league system for three seasons and Merullo's grandson Matt had a six-year career playing for major league teams, mainly the Chicago White Sox. Matt Merullo was a scout for the Arizona Diamondbacks and is now manager of the Aberdeen IronBirds.

== Death ==
On May 30, 2015 in the early morning, Merullo had died, due to complications following a stroke a few weeks prior, aged 98, as announced by the Chicago Cubs. The team did not reveal details pertaining to his death.

== Accolades ==
In 2000, Merullo was named a member of the inaugural class of the Cape Cod Baseball League Hall of Fame, having led the Barnstable Townies to the old Cape League title in 1935. He was awarded Scout of the Year in 1990, and the prestigious Judge Emil Fuchs Award for long and meritorious service to baseball in 2006.
