= Ray Prim =

American baseball player (1906–1995)

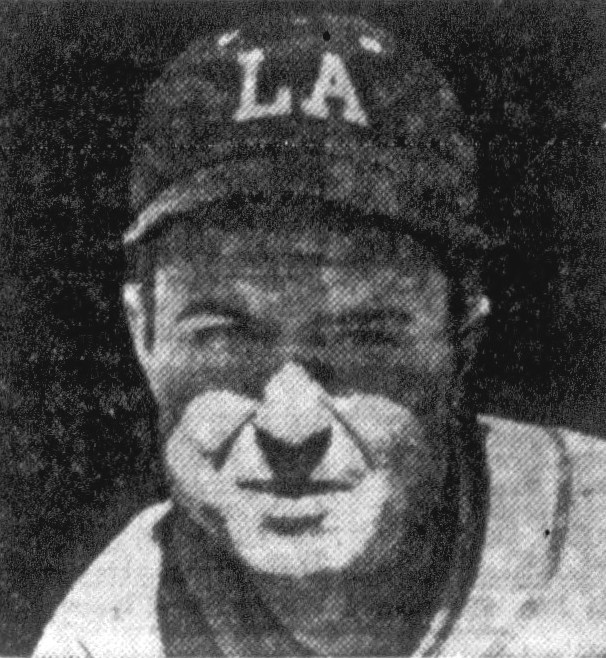
- Prim, circa 1947
- Pitcher
- Born: December 30, 1906; Salitpa, Alabama, U.S.
- Died: April 29, 1995 (aged 88); Monte Rio, California, U.S.
- Batted: Right Threw: Left

MLB debut
- September 24, 1933, for the Washington Senators

Last MLB appearance
- September 28, 1946, for the Chicago Cubs

MLB statistics
- Win–loss record: 22–21
- Earned run average: 3.56
- Strikeouts: 161
- Stats at Baseball Reference

Teams
- Washington Senators (1933–1934); Philadelphia Phillies (1935); Chicago Cubs (1943, 1945–1946)

Career highlights and awards
- NL ERA leader (1945)

Raymond Lee Prim (December 30, 1906 – April 29, 1995), nicknamed "Pop", was an American pitcher who played Major League Baseball during the 1930s and 1940s. During his professional career, he also pitched for the Los Angeles Angels of the AAA-Class Pacific Coast League (PCL). In 2005, the PCL Hall of Fame elected Prim as a member.

Throughout the years 1933 and 1946 he appeared, during six the prior mentioned years, in at least one Major League game. He played for the Washington Senators, for the Philadelphia Phillies, and for the Chicago Cubs while at the Major League level. While with the Cubs, Prim won the 1945 National League ERA title. Prim started one game in the 1945 World Series, appeared in another, and lost his only decision.

In 116 Major League games, he won 22 games and lost 21 games and recorded 161 strikeouts. As a minor league player, Prim won 150 games and posted a career ERA of 3.00 in over 2,000 games.

== Early life ==
Prim was born in Salitpa, Alabama, to Scots-Irish parents. As a youth, he burned his right hand. As result, though naturally right-handed, he threw with his left-hand, though he batted from the right side of the home plate.

He was educated in Jackson, Alabama, and attended college at Alabama Polytechnic Institute, where he lettered in baseball and football.

== Professional career ==
=== Early years ===
In 1928 Prim made his professional baseball debut. That year, he pitched with Alexandria of the Cotton States League; however, Alexandria cut Prim later that season. He did not play professional baseball again until 1930.

In 1931 Prim played with the Greensboro Patriots and the Durham Bulls of the C-Class Piedmont League. He won a combined 33 games that year and lost just 14.

Prim began the 1933 season with the Albany Senators of the International League where he went 14–10 with a 3.42 ERA. Shortly thereafter, the Chicago Cubs and Boston Braves entered into a dispute over his rights. Kenesaw Mountain Landis, the Commissioner of Baseball, ruled that Albany had the right to sell them to the franchise of their choice. Although the dispute started with the Braves and the Cubs, it was the Washington Senators who won his rights.

=== The majors and the PCL ===
Prim made his major league debut on September 24, 1933, against the Philadelphia Athletics. Prim faced Mickey Cochrane and Jimmie Foxx to start his major league career. He promptly struck out the two future Baseball Hall of Fame members. After two games, Prim underwent surgery on his foot and missed the rest of the year. Over the next few years, Prim spent time with Albany, the Philadelphia Phillies and the Minneapolis Millers. In 1936, the Millers sold Prim to the Los Angeles Angels of the PCL. Prim pitched just one inning for the Millers.

Prim spent the next six years with the Angels. In 1936 he won 16 games and lost just nine. Because he was 30 years old at the time, Prim received the nickname 'Pop' from his teammates.

By 1943 the United States was deeply involved in World War II and many major league players were drafted in the United States Army. As a result, Prim had the opportunity to play at the major league level for a second time.

After 1943 he returned to the Angels for the 1944 season. A year later, he returned to the Cubs. Prim helped the Cubs to make the 1945 World Series with a 13–8 record, an ERA of 2.40 and two shutouts. His earned run average was the lowest in the National League that year. Prim was the last Cub to lead the league in ERA until Kyle Hendricks in 2016. During the World Series versus the Detroit Tigers, Prim pitched in two games. He lost his only decision. Prim pitched for the Cubs in 1946, it was his last season in the majors.

Prim's last year in professional baseball was 1947. At the age of 41, he helped the Angels win another. Because of his outstanding performance while with the Angels, Prim joined the Pacific Coast League Hall of Fame in 2005.

=== Death ===
Prim died on April 29, 1995, in Monte Rio, California, and was buried at the Calvary Cemetery in Los Angeles.

== See also ==
- List of Major League Baseball annual ERA leaders
