= Bill Schuster =

American baseball player (1912–1987)

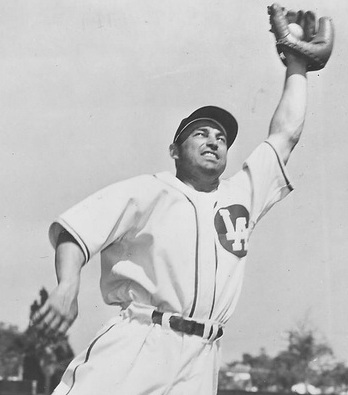
- Schuster in 1947
- Shortstop
- Born: August 4, 1912; Buffalo, New York, U.S.
- Died: June 28, 1987 (aged 74); El Monte, California, U.S.
- Batted: Right Threw: Right

MLB debut
- September 29, 1937, for the Pittsburgh Pirates

Last MLB appearance
- September 29, 1945, for the Chicago Cubs

MLB statistics
- Batting average: .234
- Home runs: 1
- Runs batted in: 17
- Stats at Baseball Reference

Teams
- Pittsburgh Pirates (1937); Boston Bees (1939); Chicago Cubs (1943–1945)

William Charles Schuster (August 4, 1912 – June 28, 1987) was an American professional baseball player who played shortstop in the Major League Baseball from 1937 to 1945. He would play for the Pittsburgh Pirates, Boston Bees, and Chicago Cubs.

Schuester attended Seneca Vocational High School before signing a professional contract in 1934.

Schuster scored the winning run in the Chicago Cubs' last victory in a World Series game prior to 2016. He was a pinch runner in the 11th inning of Game 6 at Wrigley Field in the 1945 World Series and scored from first base on Stan Hack's walk-off double for an 8–7 Cub win over Detroit. It was to be Schuster's last appearance in a major league game.

After retiring as a player, Schuster managed the Vancouver Capilanos of the Western International League in 1950 and 1951, served as a third base coach for the Seattle Rainiers, worked in the press room of the Los Angeles Times and worked at a gas station in Woodland Hills, California before dying of a heart attack at age 74.

For his long career in the minor leagues, which included 1,872 hits over 16 seasons, Schuster is a member of the Pacific Coast League Hall of Fame.
