= Roy Hughes (baseball) =

American baseball player (1911–1995)

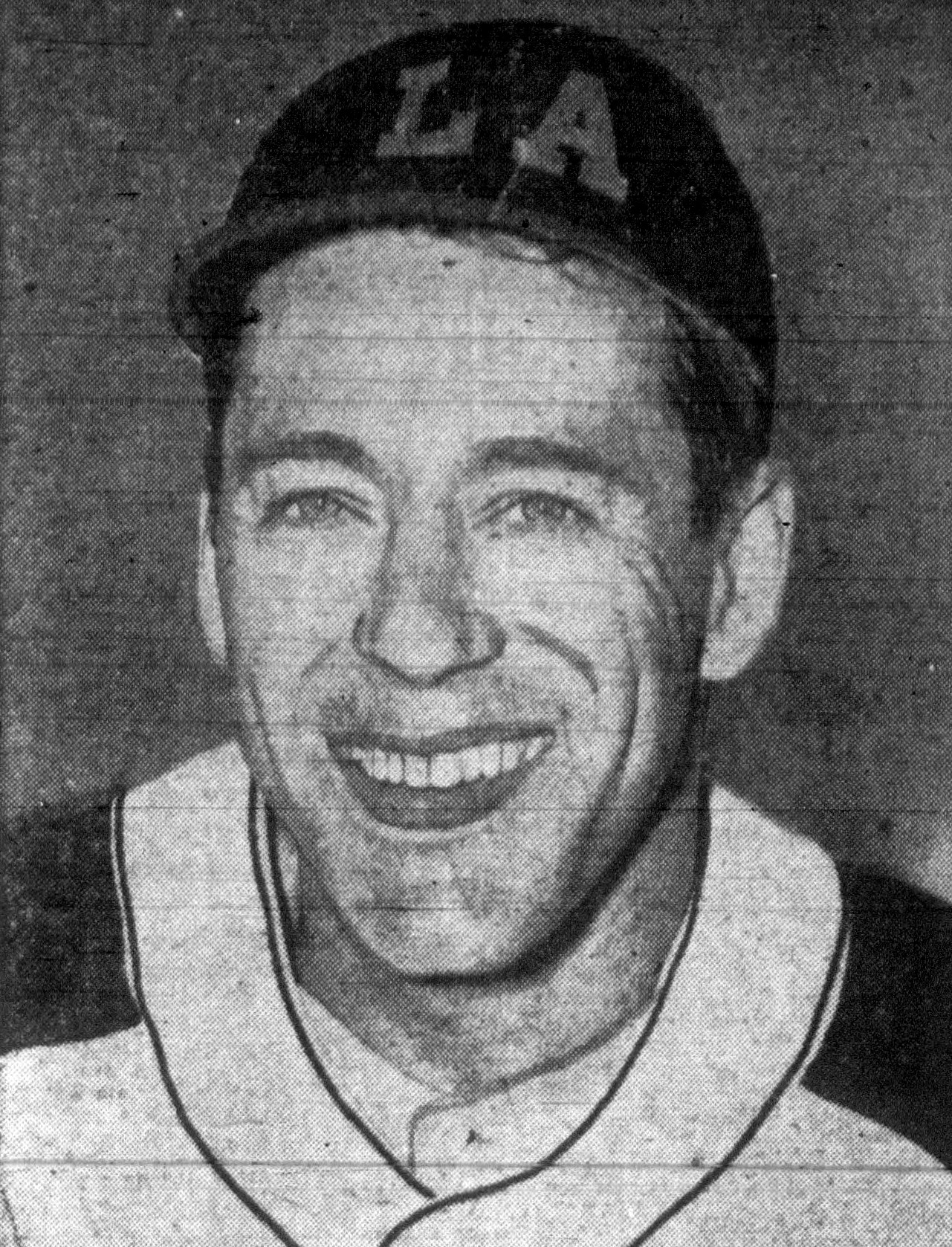
- Hughes, circa 1943
- Infielder
- Born: January 11, 1911; Cincinnati, Ohio, U.S.
- Died: March 5, 1995 (aged 84); Asheville, North Carolina, U.S.
- Batted: Right Threw: Right

MLB debut
- April 16, 1935, for the Cleveland Indians

Last MLB appearance
- September 28, 1946, for the Philadelphia Phillies

MLB statistics
- Batting average: .273
- Home runs: 5
- Runs batted in: 205
- Stats at Baseball Reference

Teams
- Cleveland Indians (1935–1937); St. Louis Browns (1938–1939); Philadelphia Phillies (1939–1940); Chicago Cubs (1944–1945); Philadelphia Phillies (1946)

Roy John "Sage" or "Jeep" Hughes (January 11, 1911 – March 5, 1995) was an American professional baseball infielder, who played in Major League Baseball with the Cleveland Indians, St. Louis Browns, Philadelphia Phillies, and Chicago Cubs.

Hughes started six games at shortstop for the Cubs during the 1945 World Series, handling 31 total chances without an error, turned two double plays, and batted .294 with five hits, including a double, in 17 at bats. That season, Hughes had been the Cubs' utility infielder, with Lennie Merullo at shortstop, however Hughes got the nod as the team's midfielder in all but one game of the 1945 World Series, won in seven games by the Detroit Tigers.

His ninth-inning single in Game 7 was the last hit by a Cubs player in a World Series game until Chicago made it to the 2016 World Series.

Born in Cincinnati, Hughes stood 5 feet 10 inches (1.78 m) tall, weighed 167 pounds (76 kg) and batted and threw right-handed.

Including minor league service, his professional career spanned 18 seasons (1933–1947; 1949–1951).

As a Major Leaguer, Hughes divided his time between second base (345 games), third base (170) and shortstop (154). Altogether, he collected 705 hits in the Majors, including 105 doubles and 27 triples.
