= Heinz Becker =

German baseball player (1915–1991)

- First baseman
- Born: August 26, 1915; Berlin, Prussia
- Died: November 11, 1991 (aged 76); Dallas, Texas, U.S.
- Batted: Both Threw: Right

MLB debut
- April 21, 1943, for the Chicago Cubs

Last MLB appearance
- May 9, 1947, for the Cleveland Indians

MLB statistics
- Batting average: .263
- Home runs: 2
- Runs batted in: 47
- Stats at Baseball Reference

Teams
- Chicago Cubs (1943, 1945–1946); Cleveland Indians (1946–1947)

Heinz Reinhard Becker (August 26, 1915 – November 11, 1991) was a Major League Baseball first baseman for the Chicago Cubs and Cleveland Indians from 1943–1947. A switch hitter, Becker was a member of the Cubs during their National League pennant win in 1945 but made his prominence with the Milwaukee Brewers of the American Association during the 1940s.

Born in Berlin, Germany as the son of a prominent brewer, Becker and his family moved to Venezuela in 1921 to start a cattle ranch. Despite making money in the brewing business, the family lost money in the cattle ranching expedition. They moved to Dallas, Texas after the cattle ranch venture failed. Becker was a product of the Chicago White Sox's Rayne Rice Birds of the Evangeline Baseball League, where he signed in 1938.

== Career ==
Becker was a first baseman for the 1945 Chicago Cubs, the last Cubs team to win a National League pennant until 2016. He played in 67 games and hit .286 with two home runs, 27 runs batted in, and 25 runs scored. He played solid defense, making no errors in 28 appearances at first base.

He was traded by the Cubs to the Cleveland Indians for first baseman Mickey Rocco and cash on June 26, 1946 as part of a planned restocking progress by Bill Veeck. While playing for the Indians, Becker was a roommate of Bob Feller's. He would hit .299 in 59 games that season.

He was released by Cleveland on May 12, 1947 alongside pitcher Ed Hanyzewski. He signed with the Milwaukee Brewers of the American Association two days later, but never again appeared in a major league game.

Career totals include 152 games played, 92 hits, 2 HR, 47 RBI, 45 runs scored, and a lifetime batting average of .263. His on-base percentage was .359, and he had a slugging percentage of .346. He had a lifetime fielding percentage of .994 in 90 appearances at first base and participated in 64 double plays.

== Legacy ==
Becker died at the age of 76 in Dallas, Texas.

Becker had problems with his feet during his playing career, earning him the nickname "Bunions". He was referenced in Chicago columnist Mike Royko's annual Cubs quiz on April 18, 1968:

Q: Which of these two players always had sore feet? Heinz Becker or the immortal Dominic Dallessandro?
A: Becker had sore feet. Dallessandro had tiny feet. It used to take him twenty jumps to get out of the dugout.
