= Clarence Maddern =

American baseball player (1921–1986)

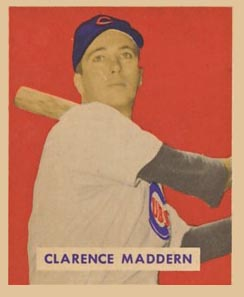
- Outfielder
- Born: September 26, 1921; Lowell, Arizona, US
- Died: August 9, 1986 (aged 64); Tucson, Arizona, US
- Batted: Right Threw: Right

MLB debut
- September 19, 1946, for the Chicago Cubs

Last MLB appearance
- September 25, 1951, for the Cleveland Indians

MLB statistics
- Batting average: .248
- Home runs: 5
- Runs batted in: 29
- Stats at Baseball Reference

Teams
- Chicago Cubs (1946; 1948–1949); Cleveland Indians (1951)

Clarence James Maddern (September 26, 1921 – August 9, 1986) was an American professional baseball outfielder who appeared in 104 Major League games for the Chicago Cubs in 1946, 1948 and 1949, and the Cleveland Indians in 1951. His minor league career extended from 1940 through 1957. He threw and batted right-handed, stood 6 feet 1 inch (1.85 m) tall and weighed 185 pounds (84 kg).

Maddern attended the University of Arizona on a baseball scholarship and signed a contract with the Cubs' minor league affiliate Bisbee Bees, in the Arizona–Texas League. His career was interrupted by service from 1943 to 1945 in the United States Army during World War II, when he served in the 76th Infantry Division. Maddern served in France and participated in the Battle of the Bulge.

In 1946 Maddern was leading the Texas League in hitting with the Tulsa Oilers before being called up by the parent Cubs. He also was a stalwart in the postwar Pacific Coast League as a star for the Los Angeles Angels and a member of four other PCL clubs. The biggest moment in his career came the night of September 29, 1947, before a sellout crowd in Los Angeles' Wrigley Field. The Angels and the San Francisco Seals had finished in a dead heat for the PCL pennant and met in a one-game playoff. The game was a scoreless tie until Maddern broke it up with a grand slam home run in the eighth inning to give the Angels a 5–0 win over the Seals.

Maddern left baseball in 1957, returned to Bisbee and became an insurance agent.
