= Hy Vandenberg =

American baseball player (1906–1994)

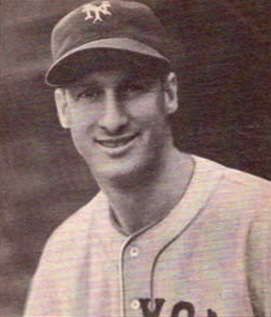
- Pitcher
- Born: March 17, 1906; Abilene, Kansas, U.S.
- Died: July 31, 1994 (aged 88); Bloomington, Minnesota, U.S.
- Batted: Right Threw: Right

MLB debut
- June 8, 1935, for the Boston Red Sox

Last MLB appearance
- September 9, 1945, for the Chicago Cubs

MLB statistics
- Win–loss record: 15–10
- Earned run average: 4.32
- Strikeouts: 120
- Stats at Baseball Reference

Teams
- Boston Red Sox (1935); New York Giants (1937–1940); Chicago Cubs (1944–1945)

Harold Harris "Hy" Vandenberg (March 17, 1906 – July 31, 1994) born in Abilene, Kansas, was a pitcher for the Boston Red Sox (1935), New York Giants (1937–40) and Chicago Cubs (1944–45).

Vandenberg helped the Giants win the 1937 National League pennant and the Cubs win the 1945 NL pennant.

Over seven seasons, Vandenberg had a 15–10 win–loss record, 90 games (22 starts), seven complete games, one shutout, 43 games finished, five saves, 291 2/3 innings pitched, 304 hits allowed, 166 runs allowed, 140 earned runs allowed, 17 home runs allowed, 128 walks allowed, 120 strikeouts, six hit batsmen, four wild pitches, 1,277 batters faced and a 4.32 ERA.

Vandenberg died of cancer in Bloomington, Minnesota at the age of 88.
