= Andy Pafko =

American baseball player (1921–2013)

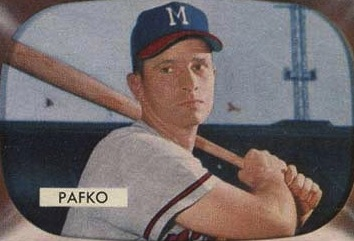
- Center fielder
- Born: February 25, 1921; Boyceville, Wisconsin, U.S.
- Died: October 8, 2013 (aged 92); Stevensville, Michigan, U.S.
- Batted: Right Threw: Right

MLB debut
- September 24, 1943, for the Chicago Cubs

Last MLB appearance
- September 29, 1959, for the Milwaukee Braves

MLB statistics
- Batting average: .285
- Home runs: 213
- Runs batted in: 976
- Stats at Baseball Reference

Teams
- Chicago Cubs (1943–1951); Brooklyn Dodgers (1951–1952); Milwaukee Braves (1953–1959)

Career highlights and awards
- 5× All-Star (1945, 1947–1950); World Series champion (1957); Chicago Cubs Hall of Fame

Andrew Pafko (February 25, 1921 – October 8, 2013) was an American professional baseball player. He played in Major League Baseball (MLB) for the Chicago Cubs (1943–51), Brooklyn Dodgers (1951–52), and Milwaukee Braves (1953–59). He batted and threw right-handed and played center field.

Pafko was born in Boyceville, Wisconsin. In his 17-year MLB career, he was an All-Star for four seasons (Note: MLB cancelled the 1945 All-Star Game and selections.) and was a .285 hitter with 213 home runs and 976 runs batted in (RBI) in 1,852 games. In 1999, he was named to the Chicago Cubs All-Century Team.

== Early years ==
Pafko grew up in Boyceville, Wisconsin. The small village did not have a baseball team. Pafko was signed as a 19-year-old by the Class D baseball team in nearby Eau Claire. Pafko learned about the interest from team manager Ivy Griffin while working on his father's farm. "I still remember the day he pulled into the driveway at the farm in that nice new car", Pafko said. "It took me about five minutes to get off the threshing machine and change my clothes. I was gone."

== Baseball career ==
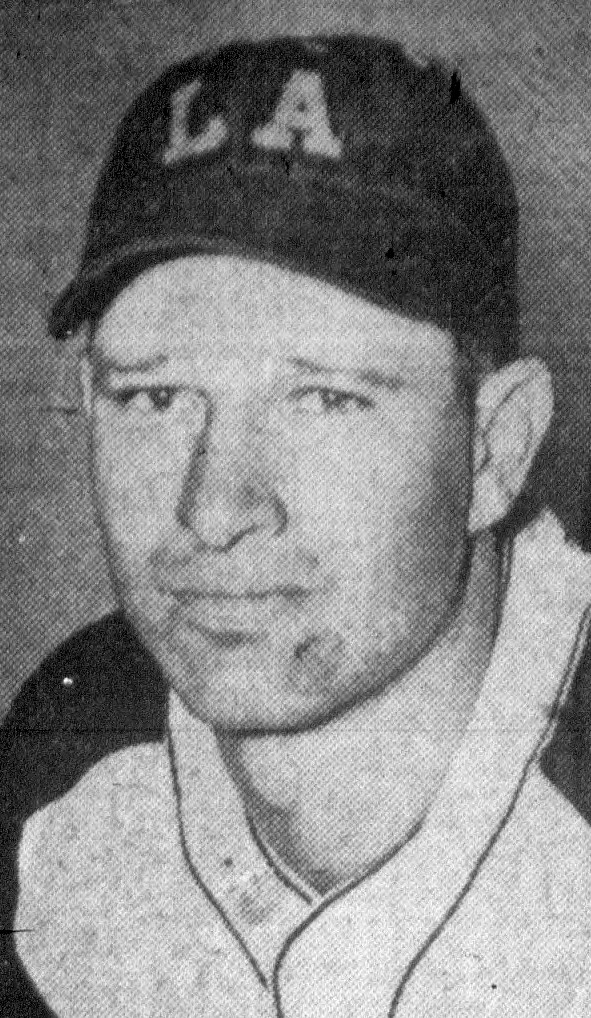
Pafko as a member of the Los Angeles Angels during the 1943 season.

In 1941, Pafko played on the Green Bay Blue Sox team in the Wisconsin State League. He had 12 home runs, 66 RBIs, while batting .349 on the team that won the league championship. He played another season in the minor leagues before debuting in the major leagues in 1943 with the Chicago Cubs.

Nicknamed "Handy Andy", Pafko was a popular player well known for good hitting and fielding, and contributed to championship-caliber teams in three different cities. Pafko became popular for taking away hits with a running dive forward, in the direction of the infield, so much so, for a time, the move was known as a "Pafko dive".

He played for the Chicago Cubs during their 1945 World Series appearance. After Cubs third baseman Stan Hack retired the following year, Pafko replaced him at third base long enough to be almost named an All-Star there. MLB cancelled the All-Star Game and selection that season due to the war, and the Associated Press sportswriters named Pafko as one of their All-Stars. Pafko did become a four-time consecutive All-Star from 1947 through 1950, making him one of the few players to achieve All-Star status in both the infield and outfield. On August 2, 1950, Pafko hit 3 home runs with 5 RBI in an 8-6 loss to the New York Giants at the Polo Grounds.

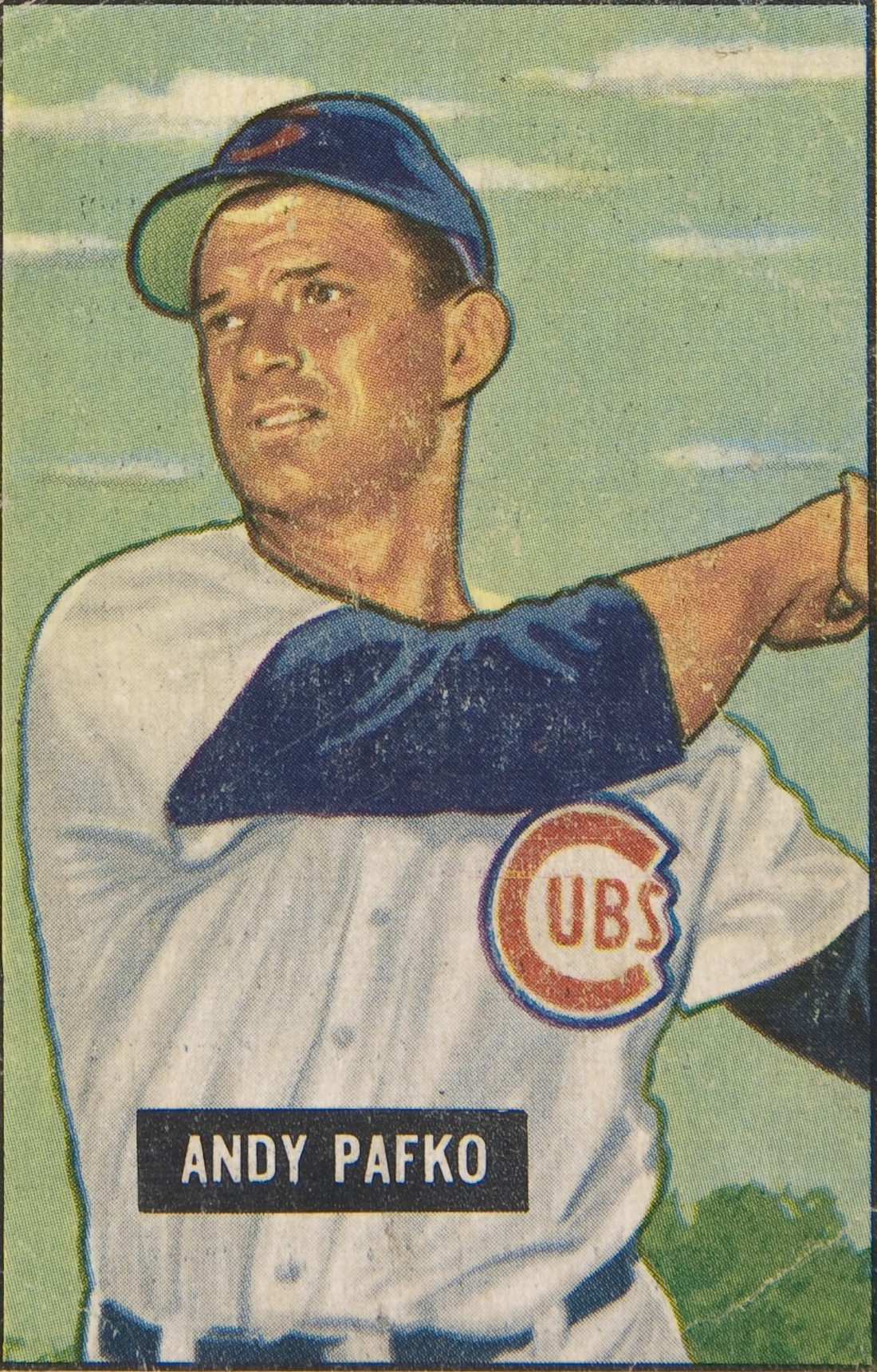
A 1951 Bowman Gum trading card of Pafko.

Pafko was traded to the Brooklyn Dodgers in June 1951 during the middle of the season; he was the left fielder when Bobby Thomson hit the "Shot Heard 'Round the World". Pafko returned home when he was traded to the Boston Braves before the start of the 1953 season, becoming the only Wisconsin native on the Braves roster when they arrived in Milwaukee and participating in their strong contending teams there, including the 1957 World Series champions. Pafko started in the first game at Milwaukee County Stadium on April 3, 1953. A devout Slovak Lutheran, he was an instant favorite with Milwaukee's large Eastern European community. In the mid 1950s, the Milwaukee area Lutherans had an "Andy Pafko Night" and gave him a new car.

=== Post-playing days ===
After playing in the major leagues, Pafko coached for the Braves from 1960 through 1962, then managed in the minor leagues, including a two-year stint as the skipper for the Kinston Eagles in the Carolina League. Pafko also scouted for the Montreal Royals in the late 1960s. He was also active in the Milwaukee Braves Historical Association. He eventually settled in the Chicago area, and always provided good copy for the press, especially when the subject of the Cubs would come up. When the Cubs won their division in 1984, Pafko mused, "I never dreamed it would take them 39 years to win again. I thought they would have won by accident before then!" Pafko was named to the Cubs All-Century team at the turn of the 21st century. Pafko and Lennie Merullo (died May 30, 2015) were the last two men alive who played for the Cubs in a World Series, prior to 2016.

The book Carl Erskine's Tales from the Dodgers Dugout: Extra Innings (2004) includes short stories from former Dodger pitcher Carl Erskine. Pafko is prominent in many of these stories. He is also the title character in Pafko at the Wall and The Perfect Pafko. He also plays a role in Roger Kahn's American classic, The Boys of Summer.

Pafko died at a nursing home in Stevensville, Michigan on October 8, 2013. He was 92.

== Legacy ==
- Pafko is known for being card #1 in the 1952 Topps baseball card set. This card in near mint or better condition is often worth tens of thousands of dollars or more because most collectors back in 1952 simply put the cards in numerical order and rubber banded the stack. This causes the top card (Pafko) to receive the most wear and tear and thus top grade copies are very rare and valuable. One of Pafko's 1952 cards sold for $84,000 in 1998. The card played a major role in the 2010 film Cop Out.
- Pafko is also remembered for a 1949 incident in which (according to him) he caught a blooper in the outfield off the bat of St. Louis Cardinal first baseman, Rocky Nelson. The outfield was strewn with paper cups, perhaps confusing umpire Al Barlick who called Nelson safe on a supposedly "trapped" catch. At the time of the play there was a runner on first base with two outs in the top of the ninth inning and the Cubs leading 3-2, so if Pafko had indeed made a valid catch, the Cubs would be 3-2 victors. Pafko started arguing with Barlick, and forgot to call time. By the time the enraged Pafko realized that time had not been called, the base runner on first had scored and Nelson was heading home. Pafko finally threw home, but his throw bounced off Nelson as Rocky slid home, giving the Cards the lead 4-3. The Cardinals subsequently went on to win 4-3 and Nelson was credited with perhaps the only "inside the glove" home run in baseball history.
- Pafko was in left field for the Brooklyn Dodgers, but unable to catch the "shot heard round the world", Bobby Thomson's game-winning 3-run homer in the famous play-off game between the Giants and Dodgers in 1951. Don DeLillo's short story about the game is thus titled "Pafko at the Wall." The left field wall at the Polo Grounds was over 15 feet high, too high for anyone to make a leaping catch.
- Andy Pafko Park in Boyceville, hosts a softball tournament every year at Cucumber Fest. The field was previously used as the home field for the high school softball team before they switched to a field at the local elementary school, Tiffany Creek.
