= Mickey Livingston =

American baseball player (1914–1983)

- Catcher
- Born: November 15, 1914; Newberry, South Carolina, U.S.
- Died: April 3, 1983 (aged 68); Houston, Texas, U.S.
- Batted: Right Threw: Right

MLB debut
- September 17, 1938, for the Washington Senators

Last MLB appearance
- September 20, 1951, for the Brooklyn Dodgers

MLB statistics
- Batting average: .238
- Home runs: 19
- Runs batted in: 153
- Stats at Baseball Reference

Teams
- Washington Senators (1938); Philadelphia Phillies (1941–1943); Chicago Cubs (1943, 1945–1947); New York Giants (1947–1949); Boston Braves (1949); Brooklyn Dodgers (1951)

Thompson Orville "Mickey" Livingston (November 15, 1914 – April 3, 1983) was an American professional baseball catcher. He played ten seasons in Major League Baseball (MLB) between 1938 and 1951 for the Washington Senators, Philadelphia Phillies, Chicago Cubs, New York Giants, Boston Braves and Brooklyn Dodgers. Born in Newberry, South Carolina, he batted and threw right-handed, stood 6 feet 1 inch (1.85 m) tall and weighed 185 pounds (84 kg). He served in the United States Army during World War II, missing the 1944 season.

Livingston began his professional career at age 22 in 1937 after playing semipro baseball in South Carolina's textile leagues. He made his MLB debut the following season, on September 17, 1938, by collecting three hits in four at bats, including a double, as his Senators outlasted the St. Louis Browns 10–9 at Sportsman's Park.

Much of Livingston's decade-long big-league tenure was spent as a backup catcher, although he was the 1943 Cubs' regular receiver (starting in 100 games) and the pennant-winning 1945 Cubs' most-used backstop, starting in 64 regular-season contests and catching 541 innings. Livingston followed that by starting six of the seven games at catcher for the Cubs in the 1945 World Series. He had eight hits in 22 at bats (.364), including three doubles. Chicago went 3–3 in those six games, including the decisive Game 7, which the Cubs dropped to the Series champion Detroit Tigers.

Livingston was a teammate of Jackie Robinson on the 1951 Brooklyn Dodgers. He played for the last time on September 20 and did not appear in the tie-breaker postseason series, which ended October 3, 1951, with the "Shot Heard 'Round the World" pennant-winning home run by the Giants' Bobby Thomson. From 1952 to 1956, Livingston was a player-manager in the minor leagues.

During his 561-game MLB playing career, Livingston batted .238. His 354 hits included 56 doubles, nine triples and 19 home runs, with 153 runs batted in.
