= Los Angeles Angels (PCL) =

- 1903–1957; Los Angeles, California

Minor league affiliations
- Class: Open (1952–1957); Triple-A (1946–1951); Double-A (1912–1945); Single-A (1903–1911)
- League: Pacific Coast League (1903–1957)

Major league affiliations
- Team: Brooklyn Dodgers (1957); Chicago Cubs (1932–1956)

Minor league titles
- League titles (11): 1903; 1905; 1907; 1908; 1916; 1921; 1926; 1933; 1934; 1947; 1956

Team data
- Name: Los Angeles Angels (1903–1957)
- Ballpark: Wrigley Field (1925–1957); Washington Park (1911–1925); Chutes Park (1903–1910)

The Los Angeles Angels were a professional baseball team based in Los Angeles that played in the Pacific Coast League (PCL) from 1903 through 1957.

The Angels were formed in 1903 as charter members of the PCL. In 1958, they were forced to move to a smaller market as a result of the Brooklyn Dodgers' move to Los Angeles, which brought Major League Baseball competition into the PCL's territory. The franchise relocated to Spokane, Washington, as the Spokane Indians.

The 1903, 1934, and 1943 Angels were recognized as being among the 100 greatest minor league teams of all time. The 1934 team, with a 137–50 record, was ranked as the number one minor league team.

== Team history ==
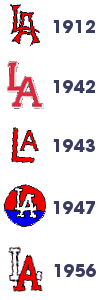
Progression of LA Angels logotype.

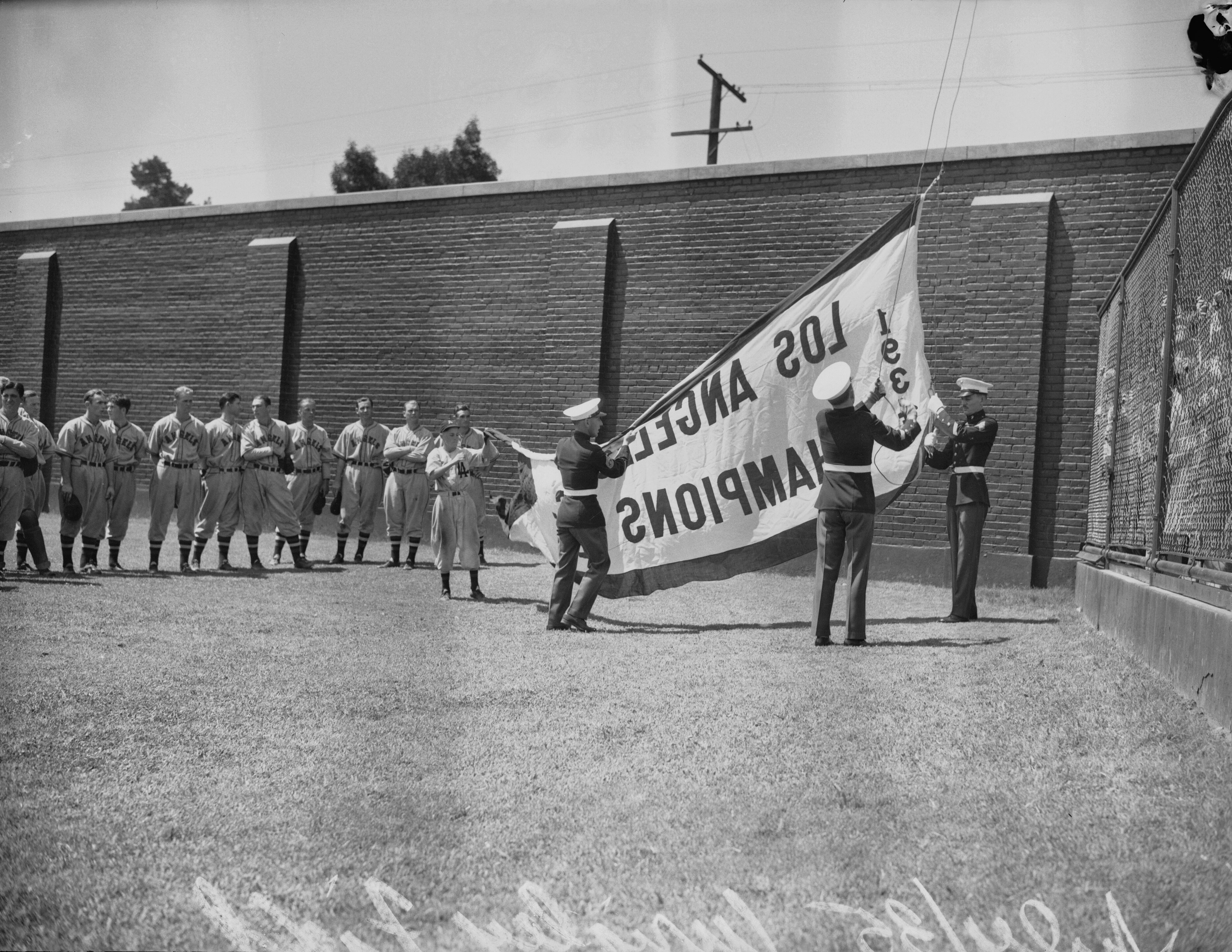
Los Angeles Angels players watching a banner of the 1934 PCL championship being hung up on July 28, 1935

From 1903 through 1957, the Los Angeles Angels were one of the mainstays of the Pacific Coast League (PCL), winning the PCL pennant 12 times. The Angels, along with the Portland Beavers, Oakland Oaks, Sacramento Solons, San Francisco Seals, and Seattle Indians, were charter members of the Pacific Coast League.

From 1903 through 1925, the team played at the 15,000-seat Washington Park (also known as Chutes Park), just south of downtown Los Angeles. Both the team and the park were founded by James Furlong "Jim" Morley (1869–1940), an entrepreneur involved in bowling, prize fighting, billiards, and gemstones as well as baseball.

During this time, the Angels (also known as the Looloos or Seraphs), won pennants in 1903, 1905, 1907, 1908, 1916, 1918, and 1921. In 1918, the team finished second in regular season play, but won the postseason series against their cross-town rivals, the Vernon Tigers. From 1915 to 1921, the Angels were owned by John F. "Johnny" Powers, a Los Angeles socialite. The 1916 team was managed by Frank Chance, baseball Hall of Famer, and part of "Tinker to Evers to Chance."

In 1921, the team was purchased by chewing-gum magnate William Wrigley Jr., the owner of the Chicago Cubs of the National League. When Wrigley could not get the city of Los Angeles to make the improvements to Washington Park that he requested, he began construction of his own 21,000-seat stadium, appropriately named Wrigley Field, at 42nd Place and Avalon Boulevard in South Los Angeles. The Angels began play at Wrigley in 1926, and responded by winning their eighth PCL pennant, 10 1/2 games ahead of the second-place Oakland Oaks. The stadium was best known as the venue for the 1960 TV show Home Run Derby, filmed in December 1959.

The Seraphs won the pennant again in 1933. The following year, they fielded what is regarded as one of the greatest teams in the history of baseball. They finished at 137–50 (.733), 35 1/2 games ahead of the Mission Reds on an annualized basis (the PCL used a split season format that year). Due to their success, their opponent in the postseason series (which the Angels won) was an all-star team composed of players from the other seven PCL teams.

The team continued to win pennants in 1938, 1943, 1944, and 1947, with the 1943 team being considered among the best in league history. For the following eight years, however, the Angels struggled. In 1949, the Seraphs finished in last place (their third time doing so in 47 years). After finishing in third place in 1955, the Angels won their last pennant in the PCL in 1956. Led by their portly, popular first baseman Steve Bilko, the Seraphs finished 101–61 (.623), sixteen games ahead of the runner-up Seattle Rainiers. Their manager was Bob Scheffing, who later managed the Detroit Tigers and Chicago Cubs.

== Area rivals ==
In 1909, the PCL added two teams to become a six-team league (in 1919, it added two more). One of the new teams was located in the nearby town of Vernon, and the Angels had their first cross-town rival in the Vernon Tigers. Vernon, a small town, was one of only two cities in Los Angeles County that had legalized the sale of alcohol—with alcoholic beverages as an attraction, the Tigers attracted big crowds by the standards of the day, and won three pennants during their 17-year history. In 1919, the Tigers were purchased by actor Roscoe "Fatty" Arbuckle. Opening day in 1919 featured a preliminary "game" which included Arbuckle, Tom Mix, and Buster Keaton. Later that year, with the ratification of the 18th Amendment and the criminalizing of alcohol consumption, crowds became sparse. The Tigers were sold to San Francisco interests, which included Herbert Fleishhacker, and moved there for the 1926 season, becoming the Mission Reds.

The move of the Tigers prompted the owner of the Salt Lake City Bees to move his team to Los Angeles for the 1926 season. The team began play as the Hollywood Bees, but soon changed their name to the Hollywood Stars. This first version of the Stars, supposedly representing Hollywood, actually played home games as tenants of the Angels at Wrigley Field. Though the Stars won pennants in 1929 and 1930, they never developed much of a fan base. They were merely a team to watch when the Angels were on the road. After the 1935 season, the Angels doubled the Stars’ rent, whereupon the Stars moved to San Diego for the 1936 season, becoming the San Diego Padres, and Los Angeles became a one-team city for the 1936 and 1937 seasons.

In 1938, the former Vernon Tigers, who had played as the Mission Reds since 1926, moved back to Los Angeles and became the second iteration of the Hollywood Stars. Like their predecessors, they played their home games at Wrigley Field. After that season, the team was sold to new owners, amongst them Robert H. Cobb, co-owner of the Brown Derby restaurant chain and for whom the Cobb salad is named. They sold stock in the team to movie stars, movie moguls, and Hollywood civic leaders. Moreover, the team actually played in the Hollywood area, beginning in 1939 when Gilmore Field was opened in the Fairfax District adjacent to Hollywood.

The new Stars (or "Twinks") caught on and became a very popular team, winning three pennants before 1958. They were genuine rivals to the Angels, and it was not uncommon for fights between the teams to break out during games. One instance occurred August 2, 1953, where a brawl between the two teams lasted 30 minutes, broken up only when 50 riot police were sent to Gilmore Field by LAPD Chief William Parker, who was at home watching the game on television when the fight started.

=== The beginning of the end ===
Early in 1957, Philip Wrigley, who had inherited the team from his father, sold the Angels and Wrigley Field to Brooklyn Dodgers owner Walter O'Malley for the then-astronomical sum of $3,000,000 ($34,389,800 today), as well as ownership of the Fort Worth Panthers of the Texas League. O'Malley assured the PCL owners that he intended to operate the Angels as a PCL team, as the Wrigleys had. He kept his promise – for one season. The ownership of the minor league team also gave O'Malley exclusive rights to major league baseball in Los Angeles, and he used this to relocate the Dodgers.

After the 1957 season, the Angels and the Stars were relocated when the Dodgers confirmed their long-rumored move to Los Angeles for the 1958 season. The following year, the Angels relocated to Spokane, Washington, where they continued as the Spokane Indians. The Stars relocated to Salt Lake City, Utah, (where the original Stars had moved from in 1926), becoming the Salt Lake City Bees once more.

The new Los Angeles Dodgers would adopt the interlocking "LA" cap logo of the Angels, with a color change to Dodger Blue and white.

=== After Los Angeles ===
After Los Angeles, the franchise had stays in Spokane, Washington, (Indians, 1958–1971) and Albuquerque, New Mexico, (Dukes, for the "Duke City") from 1972 to 2000. The franchise was sold and became the third incarnation of the Portland Beavers (2001–2010).

In 2010, the franchise was purchased by San Diego Padres' principal owner Jeff Moorad, after the Portland City Council chose to renovate PGE Park as a soccer-only facility for the Portland Timbers of Major League Soccer rather than continue as a joint-use baseball and soccer stadium. The franchise relocated to Tucson, Arizona, for the 2011 season as the Tucson Padres. Moorad intended to have the team play in Escondido, a suburb northeast of San Diego, starting in 2013; however, those plans fell through. After three seasons in Tucson, they moved in 2014 to El Paso, Texas, and became the El Paso Chihuahuas.

On May 26, 2012, the MLB's Los Angeles Angels wore the PCL franchise's 1950s uniforms during a game at Safeco Field against the Seattle Mariners, as part of the Mariners' "turn back the clock 1950s" game.

== Affiliations ==
The Angels were affiliated with the following major league teams:

Year	Affiliation(s)
1921–56	Chicago Cubs
1957	Brooklyn Dodgers

== Notable Angels with MLB experience ==
- Gene Baker
- Steve Bilko
- Cliff Chambers
- Dick Conger
- Chuck Connors
- Gavvy Cravath
- Sam Crawford
- Frank Demaree
- Howard Ehmke
- Brad Hogg
- Roy Hughes
- Tommy Lasorda
- Clarence Maddern
- Gene Mauch
- Johnny Moore
- Bobo Newsom
- Johnny Ostrowski
- Andy Pafko
- Jimmie Reese
- Bill Sarni
- Jigger Statz
- Dixie Upright
