= Bobby Sturgeon =

American baseball player (1919–2007)

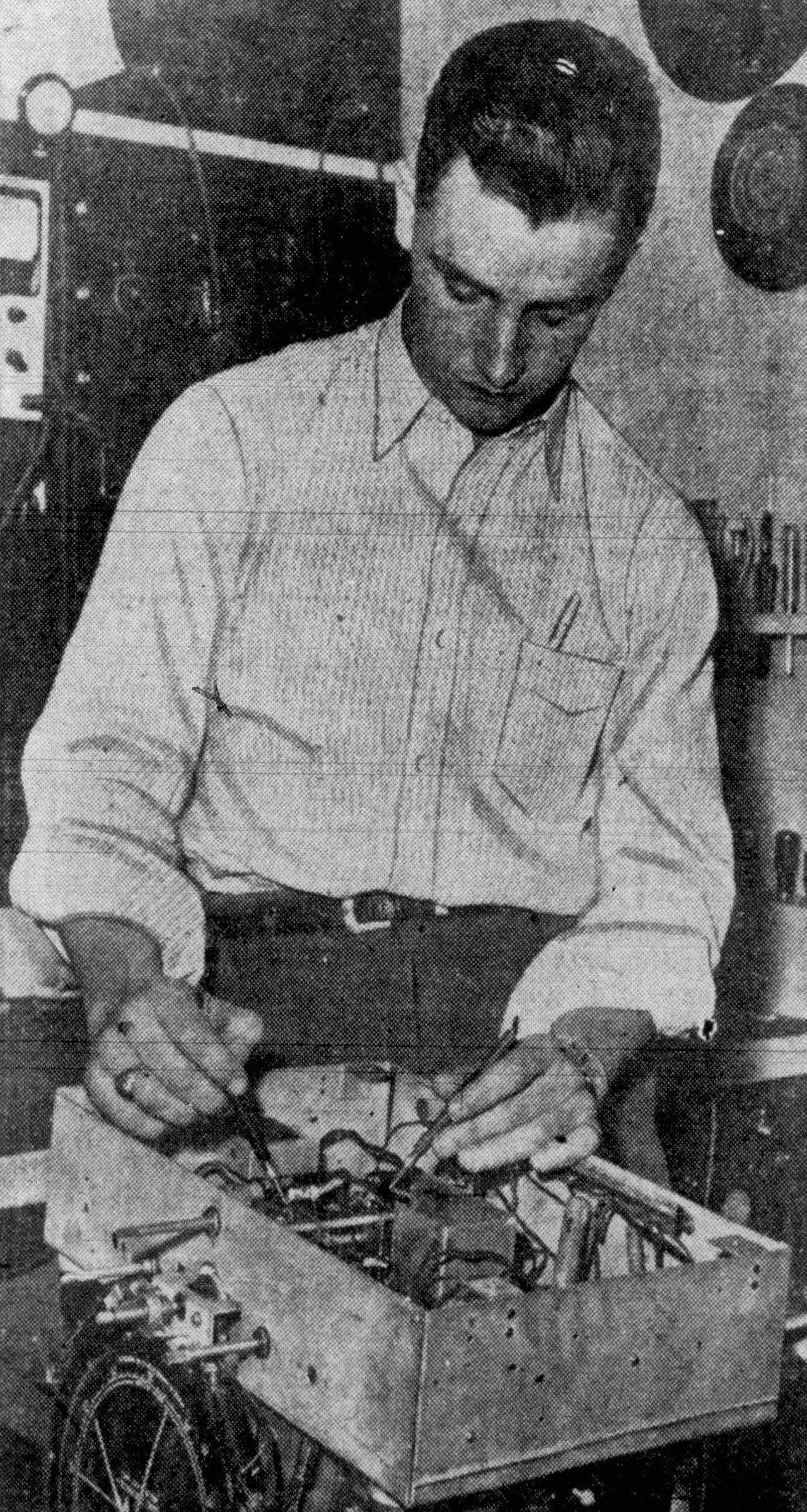
- Sturgeon, circa 1942, during his off-season job repairing radios in Long Beach, California.
- Shortstop / Second baseman
- Born: August 6, 1919; Clinton, Indiana, U.S.
- Died: March 10, 2007 (aged 87); San Dimas, California, U.S.
- Batted: Right Threw: Right

MLB debut
- April 16, 1940, for the Chicago Cubs

Last MLB appearance
- October 3, 1948, for the Boston Braves

MLB statistics
- Batting average: .257
- Home runs: 1
- Runs batted in: 80
- Stats at Baseball Reference

Teams
- Chicago Cubs (1940–1942, 1946–1947); Boston Braves (1948)

Robert Harwood Sturgeon (August 6, 1919 – March 10, 2007) was an American shortstop and second baseman in Major League Baseball who played between 1940 and 1948 for the Chicago Cubs (1940–1942, 1946–1947) and Boston Braves (1948). Listed at 6 ft 0 in (1.83 m), 175 lb., Sturgeon batted and threw right-handed. He was born in Clinton, Indiana.

Sturgeon was one of many major leaguers who saw his baseball career interrupted when he joined the US Navy during World War II (1942–45). His most productive season came for the 1946 Cubs, when he posted a career-high .296 batting average.

In a six-season career, Sturgeon was a .257 hitter (313-for-1220) with one home run and 80 RBI in 420 games played, including 106 runs, 48 doubles, 12 triples and seven stolen bases.

Sturgeon died in San Dimas, California, at age 87.
