= Johnny Moore (baseball) =

American baseball player (1902–1991)

- Outfielder
- Born: March 23, 1902; Waterville, Connecticut, U.S.
- Died: April 4, 1991 (aged 89); Bradenton, Florida, U.S.
- Batted: Left Threw: Right

MLB debut
- September 15, 1928, for the Chicago Cubs

Last MLB appearance
- September 26, 1945, for the Chicago Cubs

MLB statistics
- Batting average: .307
- Home runs: 73
- Runs batted in: 452
- Stats at Baseball Reference

Teams
- Chicago Cubs (1928–1929, 1931–1932); Cincinnati Reds (1933–1934); Philadelphia Phillies (1934–1937); Chicago Cubs (1945)

John Francis Moore (March 23, 1902 – April 4, 1991) was an American outfielder in Major League Baseball. He hit better than .300 five times with the Cubs and Phillies with a high of .330 in 1934. He drove in 90 or more runs in a season two times with 98 RBI in 1934 and 93 RBI in 1935. He finished his 10-year career with a .307 batting average (926-3013) with 73 home runs, 452 RBI, and 439 runs scored.

He was on the 1932 Chicago Cubs pennant-winning team, but went 0-7 with a run scored in 2 games in the World Series against the Yankees who swept the Cubs.

In 1945, Moore was called back to the majors by the Cubs after an 8-year stint in the minors in early September, and went 1-6 with 2 RBI down the stretch. He missed being eligible for the World Series roster by only one day.

In 1934, Moore enjoyed a 23-game hitting streak, the longest of his career, going 37-96 (.385) with 4 home runs and 22 RBI as a member of the Phillies.

His finest day in the majors came on July 22, 1936, at the Baker Bowl. Moore connected for 3 home runs, had 6 RBI, scored 4 runs and went 4-5 in a 16-4 rout of the Pirates.

Moore died April 4, 1991, at the age of 89 in Bradenton, Florida.

== Sources ==
- Career statistics from Baseball Reference · Retrosheet · Baseball Almanac
- Shatzkin, Mike (1990). The Ballplayers: Baseball's Ultimate Biographical Reference. Arbor House. p. 757.
