= Don Johnson (second baseman) =

American baseball player (1911–2000)

- Second baseman
- Born: December 7, 1911; Chicago, Illinois, U.S.
- Died: April 6, 2000 (aged 88); Laguna Beach, California, U.S.
- Batted: Right Threw: Right

MLB debut
- September 26, 1943, for the Chicago Cubs

Last MLB appearance
- May 16, 1948, for the Chicago Cubs

MLB statistics
- Batting average: .273
- Home runs: 8
- Runs batted in: 175
- Stats at Baseball Reference

Teams
- Chicago Cubs (1943–1948)

Career highlights and awards
- 2× All-Star (1944, 1945)

Donald Spore Johnson (December 7, 1911 – April 6, 2000), nicknamed "Pep", was an American Major League Baseball second baseman for the Chicago Cubs from 1943 to 1948. A native of Chicago, he attended Oregon State University before beginning his professional baseball career.

Johnson's best seasons were during World War II. In 1944, a season in which he had a career-high 71 runs batted in, he was selected for the All-Star Game. In 1945, he was an important part of the last Cubs team until 2016 to win a pennant, hitting a career-high .302 and scoring 94 runs, tenth in the league. He was also selected for the unofficial "All-Star Game" that was organized by the Associated Press after the official game was canceled.

Until Dexter Fowler led off in the 2016 World Series, Johnson was the last Cub to come to bat in a World Series game. He grounded into a force out to end the 1945 World Series defeat to the Detroit Tigers.

Career totals for 511 games include 528 hits, 8 home runs, 175 runs batted in, 219 runs scored, a .273 batting average, and an on-base percentage of .315.

His father was former major league shortstop Ernie Johnson.

== See also ==
- List of second-generation Major League Baseball players
