= Paul Erickson (baseball) =

American baseball player (1915–2002)

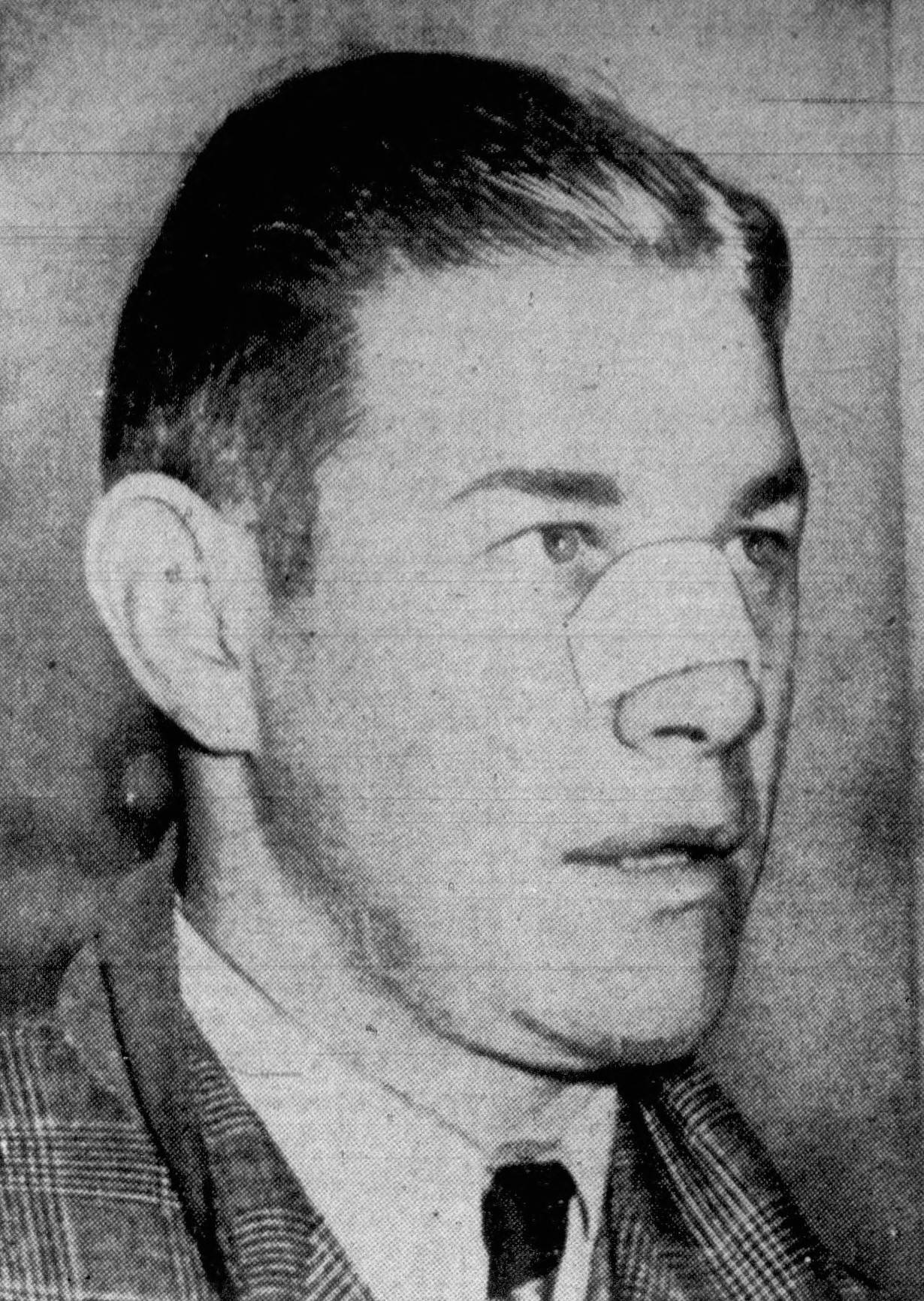
- Erickson, circa 1942
- Pitcher
- Born: December 14, 1915; Zion, Illinois, U.S.
- Died: April 5, 2002 (aged 86); Fond du Lac, Wisconsin, U.S.
- Batted: Right Threw: Right

MLB debut
- April 17, 1941, for the Chicago Cubs

Last MLB appearance
- July 10, 1948, for the New York Giants

MLB statistics
- Win–loss record: 37–48
- Earned run average: 3.86
- Strikeouts: 432
- Stats at Baseball Reference

Teams
- Chicago Cubs (1941–1948); Philadelphia Phillies (1948); New York Giants (1948)

Career highlights and awards
- Appeared in 1945 World Series

Paul Walford Erickson (December 14, 1915 – April 5, 2002), nicknamed "L'il Abner", was an American professional baseball right-handed pitcher whose career extended from 1937–49. He appeared in 207 games pitched in Major League Baseball (MLB) for the Chicago Cubs, Philadelphia Phillies, and New York Giants, between 1941 and 1948. Erickson stood 6 feet 2 inches (1.88 m) tall and weighed 200 pounds (91 kg).

Erickson, a native of Zion, Illinois, was a contributor to the Cubs' 1945 National League (NL) championship. He appeared in 28 games, nine as a starter, and won seven of 11 decisions with an earned run average (ERA) of 3.32, three complete games, and three saves, in 108 1/3 innings pitched. Erickson saved the final two games of the regular season against the Pittsburgh Pirates at Forbes Field, then worked in four of the seven games of the 1945 World Series, all Cub defeats, including the decisive Game 7 against the Detroit Tigers. He had no decisions in the Fall Classic, and in seven innings pitched Erickson surrendered three earned runs, on eight hits, and three bases on balls, for a 3.86 ERA. He recorded three strikeouts.

The following season, 1946, saw the return to action of many MLB players who had served in military service during World War II, but Erickson enjoyed his best year in the big leagues, winning a career-best nine games and posting a 2.43 ERA.

Altogether, as a Major Leaguer, Erickson worked in 814 1/3 innings, allowing 774 hits, 425 bases on balls, and tallied 432 strikeouts. He won 37 of 85 decisions (.435) and notched six career saves.
