= Hank Wyse =

American baseball player (1917–2000)

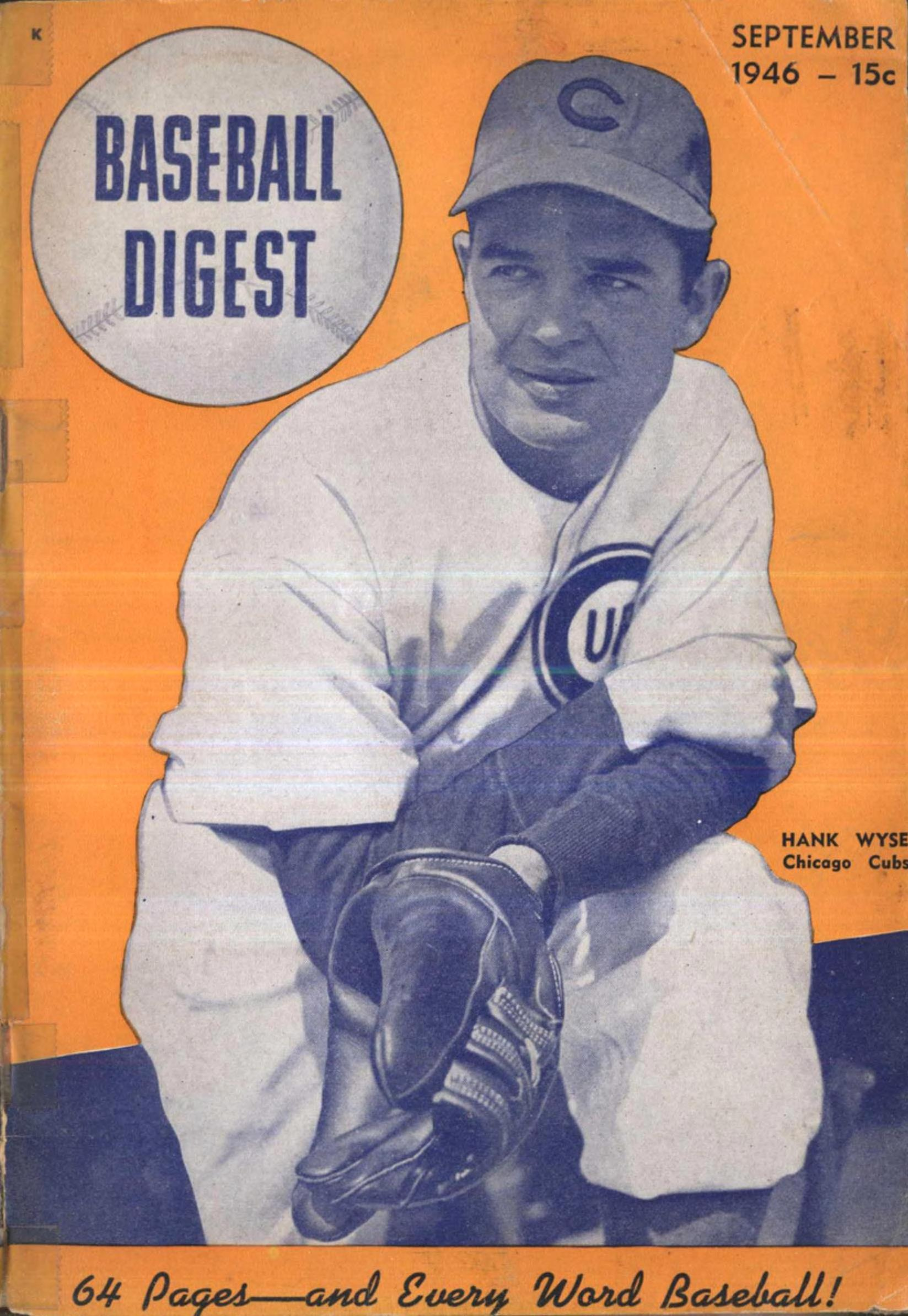
- Wyse, Baseball Digest
- Pitcher
- Born: March 1, 1917; Lunsford, Craighead County, Arkansas, U.S.
- Died: October 22, 2000 (aged 83); Pryor, Oklahoma, U.S.
- Batted: Right Threw: Right

MLB debut
- September 7, 1942, for the Chicago Cubs

Last MLB appearance
- June 14, 1951, for the Washington Senators

MLB statistics
- Win–loss record: 79–70
- Earned run average: 3.52
- Strikeouts: 362
- Stats at Baseball Reference

Teams
- Chicago Cubs (1942–1947); Philadelphia Athletics (1950–1951); Washington Senators (1951)

Career highlights and awards
- All-Star (1945)

Henry Washington Wyse (March 1, 1917 – October 22, 2000) was an American professional baseball pitcher. Between 1942 and 1951, Wyse played in Major League Baseball for the Chicago Cubs (1942–47), Philadelphia Athletics (1950–51) and Washington Senators (1951). A native of Lunsford, Craighead County, Arkansas, he was listed as 5 feet 11 inches (1.80 m) tall and 185 pounds (84 kg) and he batted and threw right-handed.

Wyse was of Cherokee and Irish descent.

== Baseball career ==
A control pitcher, Wyse was a sinkerballer and a curve specialist. Wyse was nicknamed "Hooks" in acknowledgment of his curveball, described by Wyse biographer Gregory Wolf as "knee-buckling". Wyse suffered a spinal injury that kept him from serving in World War II. As a result, he wore a corset at times to pitch.

Wyse debuted for the Chicago Cubs on September 7, 1942, and would remain a Cub thru the 1947 season. Wyse also pitched in the American League with the Philadelphia Athletics and Washington Senators for parts of two seasons, playing his final game in the major leagues on June 14, 1951.

In his eight-season MLB career, Wyse posted a 79–70 won–lost record with a 3.52 ERA, 362 strikeouts, 11 shutouts, eight saves, and 1257 2/3 innings in 251 games pitched, 159 as a starter.

=== 1945 season ===
His most productive season came in 1945, when he helped the Cubs win the National League pennant after going 22–10 with a 2.68 ERA. During that season he was, for his first and only time, selected as an All-Star and pitched a one-hitter on April 28 against the Pittsburgh Pirates. His potential no-hitter was broken up by Bill Salkeld, who singled in the 8th inning with one out. He would finish seventh in the 1945 National League Most Valuable Player vote.

Wyse would pitch and be credited with a loss in the second game of the World Series. He relieved in Games 6 and 7. Until Jon Lester pitched in the first inning of the 2016 World Series, Wyse was the last Cubs' pitcher to appear in a World Series game. The 1945 World Series would be Wyse's only postseason appearance.

== Death ==
Wyse died in Pryor, Oklahoma, at age 83. He would be posthumously inducted into the Texas League Hall of Fame in 2009.
