= Hank Borowy =

American baseball player (1916–2004)

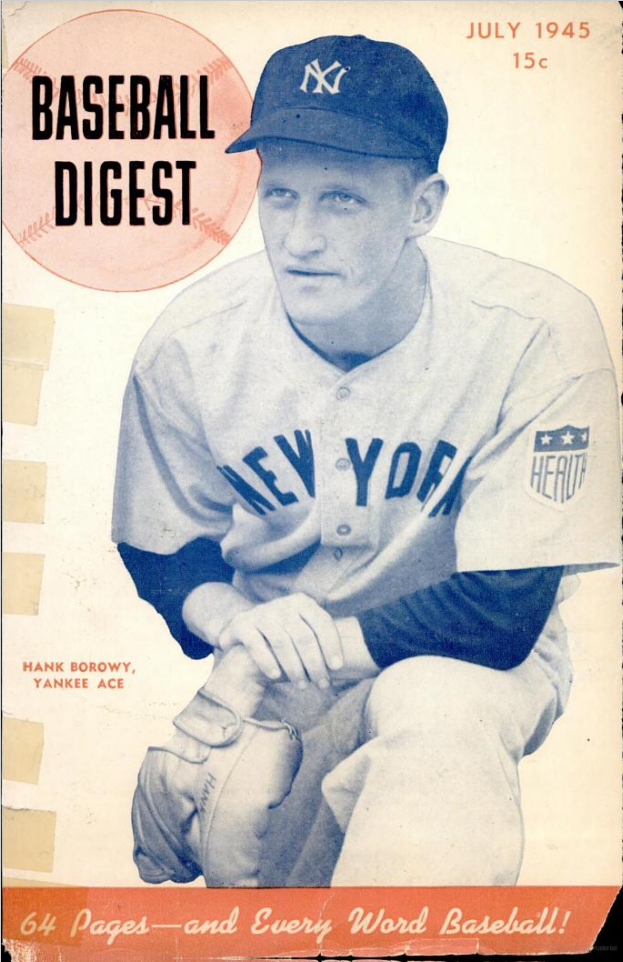
- Borowy on the front page of Baseball Digest, 1945
- Pitcher
- Born: May 12, 1916; Bloomfield, New Jersey, U.S.
- Died: August 23, 2004 (aged 88); Brick Township, New Jersey, U.S.
- Batted: Right Threw: Right

MLB debut
- April 18, 1942, for the New York Yankees

Last MLB appearance
- September 14, 1951, for the Detroit Tigers

MLB statistics
- Win–loss record: 108–82
- Earned run average: 3.50
- Strikeouts: 690
- Stats at Baseball Reference

Teams
- New York Yankees (1942–1945); Chicago Cubs (1945–1948); Philadelphia Phillies (1949–1950); Pittsburgh Pirates (1950); Detroit Tigers (1950–1951)

Career highlights and awards
- 2× All-Star (1944, 1945); World Series champion (1943)

Henry Ludwig Borowy (May 12, 1916 – August 23, 2004) was an American professional baseball player who was a starting pitcher in Major League Baseball (MLB) from 1942 through 1951 for the New York Yankees (1942–1945), Chicago Cubs (1945–1948), Philadelphia Phillies (1949–1950), Pittsburgh Pirates (1950), and Detroit Tigers (1950–1951). He batted and threw right-handed.

Born in Bloomfield, New Jersey, Borowy graduated from Bloomfield High School and Fordham University. Over the course of his career, Borowy pitched in six World Series games, and posted a 108–82 regular season record, with 690 strikeouts, and a 3.50 earned run average (ERA), in 1,717 innings.

== Major league career ==
Borowy debuted on April 18, 1942, with the Yankees, finishing with a 15–4 record, 85 strikeouts, and a 2.82 ERA. He started Game 4 of the World Series against the St. Louis Cardinals but did not receive a decision.

In 1943, Borowy went 14–9, with 107 strikeouts, and a 2.82 ERA, while being credited with the win in Game 3 of the World Series against the Cardinals. Named an All-Star in 1944, he pitched three scoreless innings in the game, ending the season with a 17–12 record, 107 strikeouts, and a 2.64 ERA.

In 1945, Borowy posted a 10–5 record with the Yankees in the first half of the season. The 1945 All Star game was cancelled due to wartime travel restrictions, but Borowy was selected a "virtual" All Star in an unofficial poll of managers conducted by the Associated Press. At the All-Star break he was placed on waivers by the Yankees, and eventually sold to the Cubs for $100,000 ($1,788,355 in current dollar terms). Borowy went 11–2 for the remainder of the season, including three wins over the Cardinals down the stretch, and led the National League (NL) in winning percentage (.846) and ERA (2.14), as the Cubs won the pennant. His combined 1945 Yankees/Cubs record was 21–7, with 82 strikeouts, and a 2.65 ERA. Borowy is one of two pitchers in major league history to win at least 10 games for two different teams in the same season (the other is Bartolo Colón, with the Cleveland Indians and Montreal Expos, in 2002).

On October 3, 1945, the Detroit Tigers and Cubs met in the World Series for the fourth time. In the opener Borowy pitched a six-hit, 9–0 shutout. He lost the fifth game, and then came back to win the sixth with four scoreless relief innings. Borowy started the final game on one day's rest but gave up hits to the first three batters before leaving. He took the loss and the Tigers won the Series. Before the 2016 World Series, Borowy was the last Chicago Cubs pitcher to win a World Series game.

Borowy is the fourth and last pitcher to hit two doubles in the same inning, on May 5, 1946 (the previous three were Fred Goldsmith, Joe Wood, and Ted Lyons).

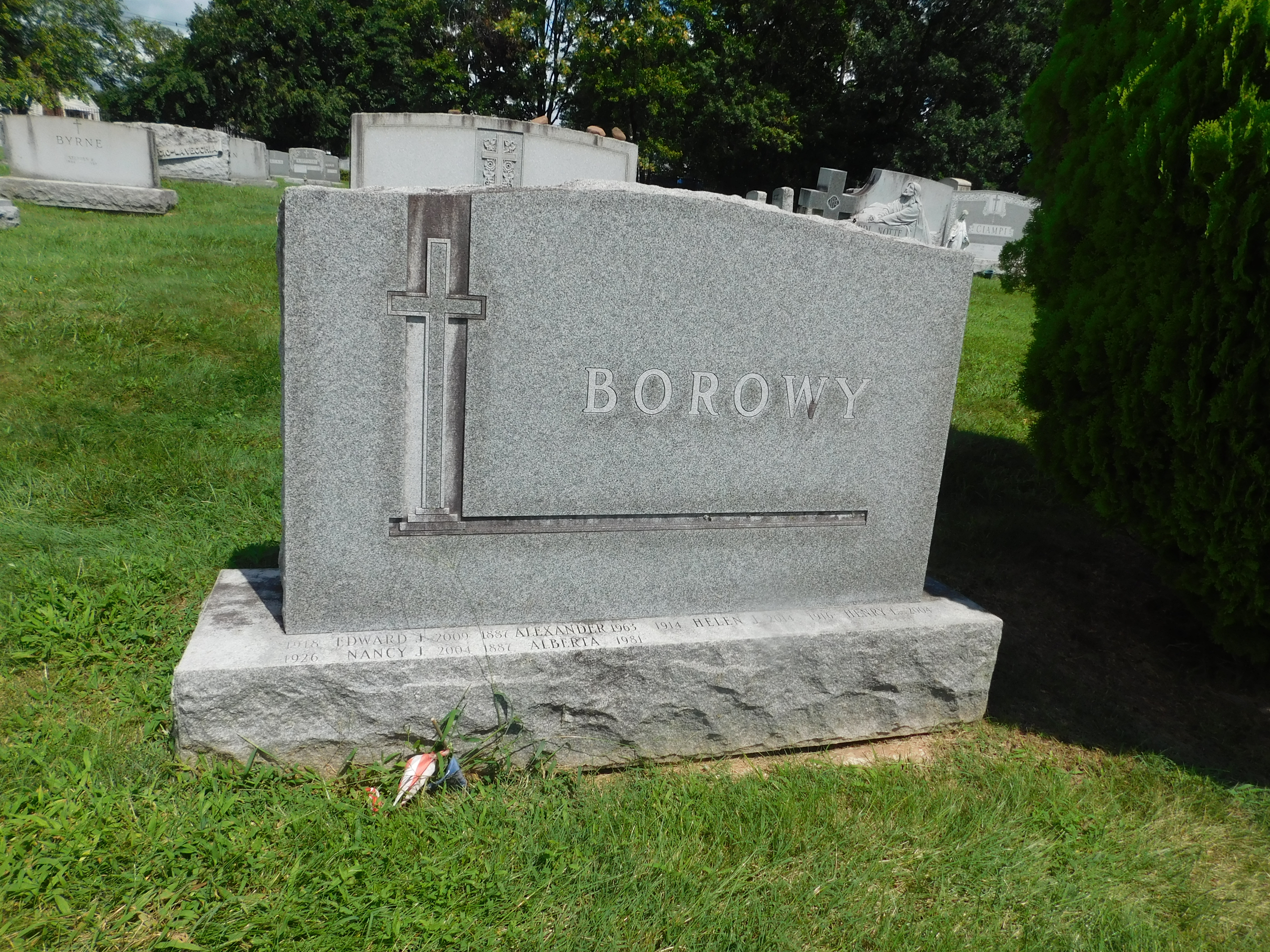
The Borowy family plot at Mount Olivet Cemetery in Bloomfield, New Jersey

For the remainder of Borowy's career, he was plagued by finger blisters and a chronic sore shoulder. Just prior to Borowy's retirement, he delivered one of the worst pitching performances ever seen in big league baseball. Playing against the St. Louis Browns on August 18, Borowy was called upon to pitch in the bottom of the seventh inning, with the game tied at 9-all. Borowy faced nine batters, and was unable to record an out, giving up four singles, four walks, and a three-run home run, before being pulled from the game by Tigers manager Red Rolfe. No other pitcher has faced nine batters in a game and not managed an out. He pitched his final game on September 14, 1951.

== Death ==
Borowy was a longtime resident of Brick Township, New Jersey, where he died on August 23, 2004, aged 88.
