= Johnny Ostrowski =

American baseball player (1917–1992)

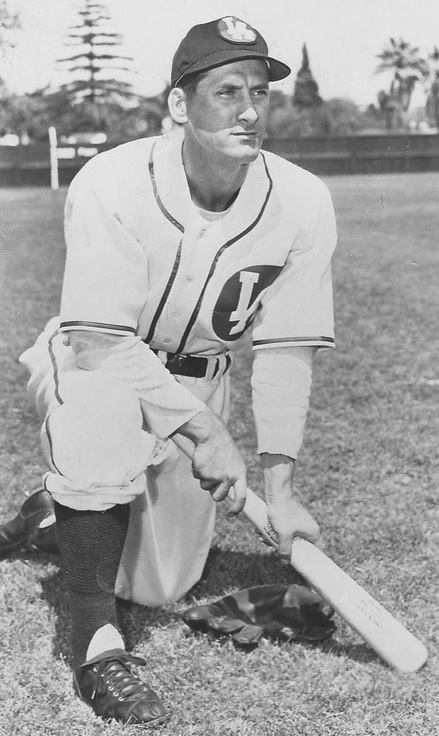
- Left fielder / Third baseman
- Born: October 17, 1917; Chicago, Illinois, U.S.
- Died: November 13, 1992 (aged 75); Chicago, Illinois, U.S.
- Batted: Right Threw: Right

MLB debut
- September 24, 1943, for the Chicago Cubs

Last MLB appearance
- October 1, 1950, for the Chicago White Sox

MLB statistics
- Batting average: .234
- Home runs: 14
- Runs batted in: 74
- Stats at Baseball Reference

Teams
- Chicago Cubs (1943–1946); Boston Red Sox (1948); Chicago White Sox (1949–1950); Washington Senators (1950)

John Thaddeus Ostrowski (October 17, 1917 – November 13, 1992) was an American professional baseball player. Born in Chicago, he was an outfielder and third baseman who spent all or part of seven Major League seasons (1943–1946; 1948–1950) with the Chicago Cubs, Boston Red Sox, Chicago White Sox and Washington Senators. Listed at 5 feet 10 1/2 inches (1.791 m) tall and 170 pounds (77 kg), Ostrowski batted and threw right-handed.

Over his 216 MLB games played, Ostrowski was a .234 hitter (131-for-561) with 14 home runs and 74 RBI in 216 games, including 73 runs, 20 doubles, nine triples, seven stolen bases, and a .321 on-base percentage. However, in a 1,600-game minor league baseball career, Ostrowski hit 218 home runs and five times exceeded the 20-homer mark, including two 30 home run seasons.

Ostrowski died in Chicago at the age of 75.
