= 1945 World Series =

1945 Major League Baseball championship series

Team (Wins)	Managers	Season
Detroit Tigers (4)	Steve O'Neill	88–65, .575, GA: 1 1/2
Chicago Cubs (3)	Charlie Grimm	98–56, .636, GA: 3
- Dates: October 3–10
- Venue(s): Briggs Stadium (Detroit); Wrigley Field (Chicago)
- Umpires: Bill Summers (AL), Lou Jorda (NL); Art Passarella (AL), Jocko Conlan (NL)
- Hall of Famers: Umpire: Jocko Conlan; Tigers: Hank Greenberg; Hal Newhouser; Cubs: none

Broadcast
- Radio: Mutual
- Radio announcers: Bill Slater and Al Helfer

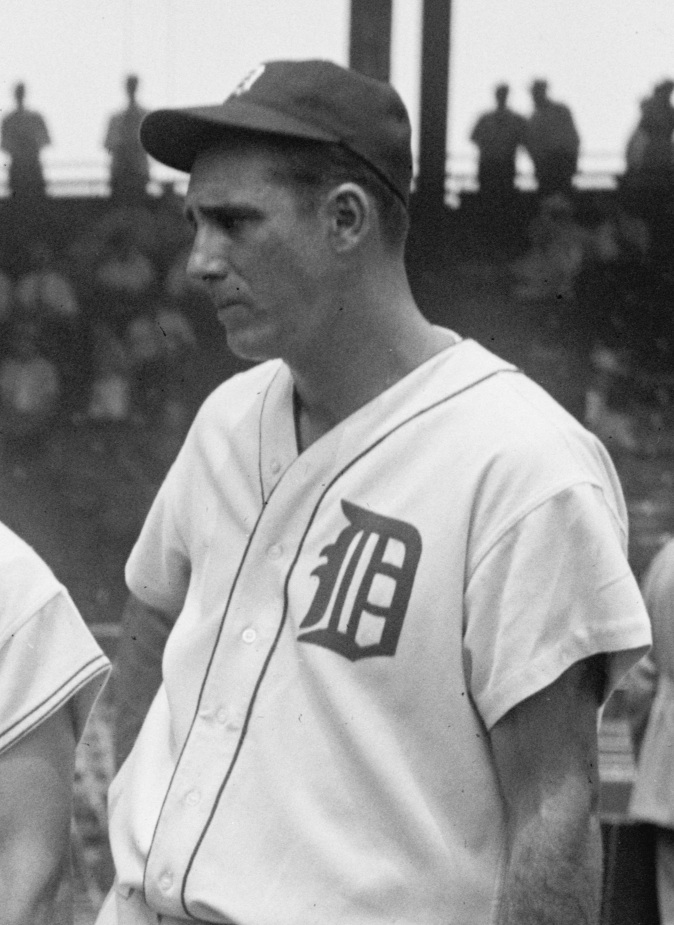
Hank Greenberg, Hall of Famer and two-time MVP

The 1945 World Series was the championship series in Major League Baseball for the 1945 season. The 42nd edition of the World Series, it matched the American League (AL) champion Detroit Tigers against the National League (NL) champion Chicago Cubs. The Tigers won the Series in seven games, giving them their second championship and first since 1935.

In the decisive Game 7, Paul Richards drove in four runs to lead the Tigers to a 9–3 victory to clinch the Series.

The World Series again used the 3–4 wartime setup for home field sites, instead of the normal 2–3–2. Although the major hostilities of World War II had ended, some of the rules were still in effect and many of the best MLB players were still in military service. Warren Brown, author of a history of the Cubs in 1946, commented on this by titling one chapter "World's Worst Series". He also cited a famous quote of his, referencing himself anonymously and in the third person. When asked who he liked in the Series, he answered, "I don't think either one of them can win it."

In a similar vein, Frank Graham jokingly called this Series "the fat men versus the tall men at the office picnic."

One player decidedly not fitting that description was the Tigers' slugger Hank Greenberg, who had been discharged from military service early. He hit the only two Tigers homers in the Series, and scored seven runs overall and also drove in seven. The series matched the league MVPs, with Phil Cavarretta (a .355 hitter that year) of the National League and Hal Newhouser of the American League for the second straight season for Detroit. Newhouser led the Tigers to two victories, including a complete game performance in Game 7.

The Curse of the Billy Goat originated in this Series before the start of Game 4. Having last won the Series in 1908, the Cubs owned the dubious record of both the longest league pennant drought and the longest World Series drought in history, not winning (or appearing in) another World Series until 2016.

The Series was a rematch of the 1935 World Series. In that year's Game 6, Stan Hack led off the top of the ninth inning with a triple, but was stranded. The Cubs lost the game and the Series. Hack was still with the Cubs in 1945. According to Warren Brown's account, Hack was seen surveying the field before the first Series game. When asked what he was doing, Hack responded, "I just wanted to see if I was still standing there on third base."

To date, the Chicago Cubs have had no personnel from this team elected to the National Baseball Hall of Fame.

== Summary ==
AL Detroit Tigers (4) vs. NL Chicago Cubs (3)

Game	Date	Score	Location	Time	Attendance
1	October 3	Chicago Cubs – 9, Detroit Tigers – 0	Briggs Stadium	2:10	54,637
2	October 4	Chicago Cubs – 1, Detroit Tigers – 4	Briggs Stadium	1:47	53,636
3	October 5	Chicago Cubs – 3, Detroit Tigers – 0	Briggs Stadium	1:55	55,500
4	October 6	Detroit Tigers – 4, Chicago Cubs – 1	Wrigley Field	2:00	42,923
5	October 7	Detroit Tigers – 8, Chicago Cubs – 4	Wrigley Field	2:18	43,463
6	October 8	Detroit Tigers – 7, Chicago Cubs – 8 (12)	Wrigley Field	3:28	41,708
7	October 10	Detroit Tigers – 9, Chicago Cubs – 3	Wrigley Field	2:31	41,590

== Matchups ==
=== Game 1 ===
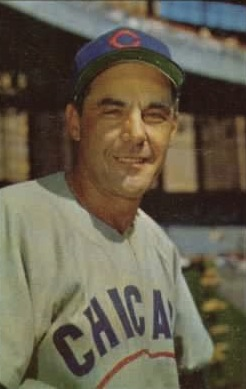
Phil Cavarretta

Wednesday, October 3, 1945 2:30 pm (ET) at Briggs Stadium in Detroit, Michigan
Team	1	2	3	4	5	6	7	8	9	R	H	E
Chicago	4	0	3	0	0	0	2	0	0	9	13	0
Detroit	0	0	0	0	0	0	0	0	0	0	6	0
WP: Hank Borowy (1–0) LP: Hal Newhouser (0–1); Home runs: CHC: Phil Cavarretta (1); DET: None

The visiting Cubs began with a bang, scoring four times in the first. With two outs and runners on first and third, a passed ball by future Hall of Famer Hal Newhouser scored the game's first run. After an intentional walk, a two-run Bill Nicholson double and Mickey Livingston's RBI single made it 4–0 Cubs. In the third, after a leadoff double, Phil Cavarretta's single and Andy Pafko's double scored a run each. One out later, Livingston's second RBI single of the game knocked Newhouser out of the game. Cavarretta's two-out home run in the seventh off Jim Tobin made it 8–0. Pafko then singled, stole second, moved to third on a passed ball, and scored the game's last run on Nicholson's single. Hank Borowy pitched a complete-game shutout despite allowing 12 base runners as the Cubs took a 1–0 series lead. This was the first and only home run hit by the Cubs in the Series and Cavaretta's home run was the last postseason home run hit by a Cub until Bob Dernier did so in Game 1 of the 1984 National League Championship Series.

=== Game 2 ===
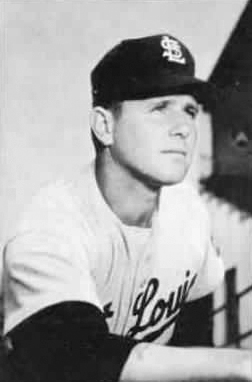
Virgil Trucks

Thursday, October 4, 1945 2:30 pm (ET) at Briggs Stadium in Detroit, Michigan
Team	1	2	3	4	5	6	7	8	9	R	H	E
Chicago	0	0	0	1	0	0	0	0	0	1	7	0
Detroit	0	0	0	0	4	0	0	0	X	4	7	0
WP: Virgil Trucks (1–0) LP: Hank Wyse (0–1); Home runs: CHC: None; DET: Hank Greenberg (1)

The Cubs struck first when Phil Cavarretta doubled with one out in the fourth and scored on Bill Nicholson's single. After 13 innings without a run, Detroit finally got going in a big way in the fifth. Hank Wyse got two outs, before allowing a single and walk. Doc Cramer's RBI single tied the game before Hank Greenberg's three-run home run put the Tigers up 4–1. Virgil Trucks allowed no other runs in a complete game as the Tigers tied the series at a game apiece.

=== Game 3 ===
Claude Passeau hurled a complete game one-hitter for the Cubs.

Friday, October 5, 1945 2:30 pm (ET) at Briggs Stadium in Detroit, Michigan
Team	1	2	3	4	5	6	7	8	9	R	H	E
Chicago	0	0	0	2	0	0	1	0	0	3	8	0
Detroit	0	0	0	0	0	0	0	0	0	0	1	2
WP: Claude Passeau (1–0) LP: Stubby Overmire (0–1)

Claude Passeau pitched a complete game one-hitter. The Tigers' only hit of the game came with two outs in the second inning off the bat of Rudy York. Other Series pitchers in the "low-hit Complete Game Club" are:

Name	Team	League	Year
Ed Reulbach	Chicago Cubs	N.L.	1906 (1-hitter)
Bill Bevens	New York Yankees	A.L.	1947 (1-hitter)
Don Larsen	New York Yankees	A.L.	1956 (perfect game)
Jim Lonborg	Boston Red Sox	A.L.	1967 (1-hitter)
Tom Glavine	Atlanta Braves	N.L.	1995 (1-hitter)

The Cubs scored two runs in the fourth off Stubby Overmire on RBI singles by Bill Nicholson and Roy Hughes after a leadoff double and one-out walk. They added another run in the seventh off Al Benton when Mickey Livingston hit a leadoff double, moved to third on a groundout and scored on Claude Passeau's sacrifice fly. They now led the series 2–1.

=== Game 4 ===
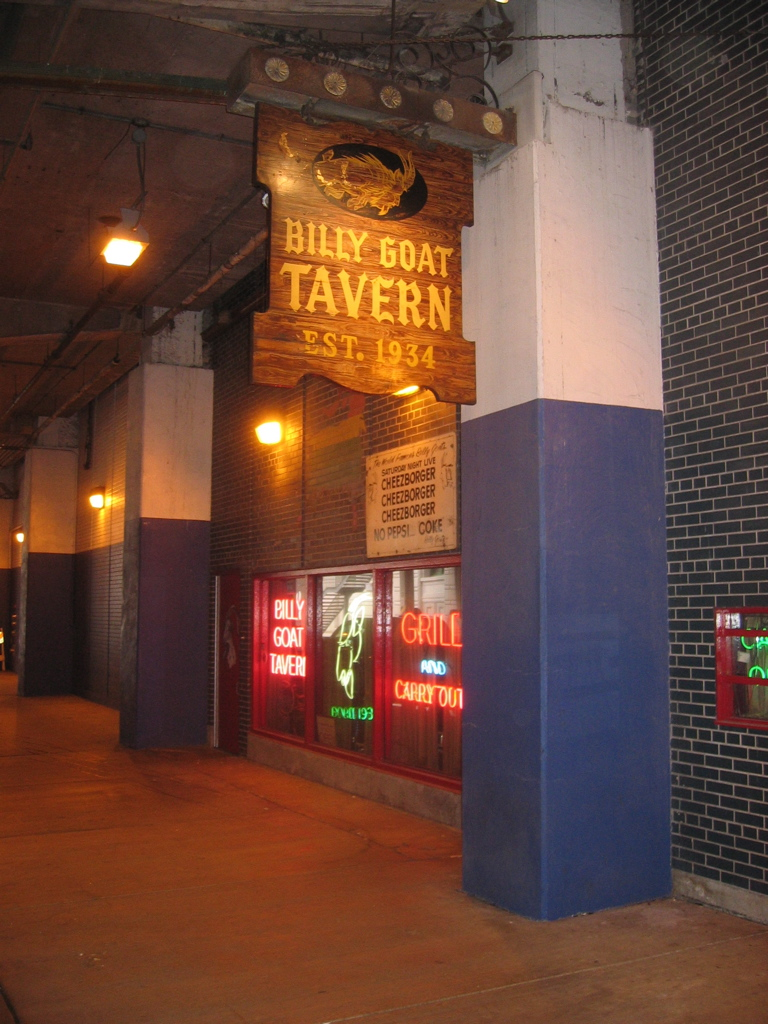
A sports-related curse was supposedly placed on the Chicago Cubs by Billy Goat Tavern owner William Sianis during Game 4.

Saturday, October 6, 1945 1:30 pm (CT) at Wrigley Field in Chicago, Illinois
Team	1	2	3	4	5	6	7	8	9	R	H	E
Detroit	0	0	0	4	0	0	0	0	0	4	7	1
Chicago	0	0	0	0	0	1	0	0	0	1	5	1
WP: Dizzy Trout (1–0) LP: Ray Prim (0–1)

The Series shifted to Wrigley Field and the so-called Curse of the Billy Goat began. Dizzy Trout went the distance for Detroit with a five-hitter. A four-run fourth against Cub starter Ray Prim gave Trout all the runs he needed. After a one-out walk and single, Hank Greenberg's RBI single and Roy Cullenbine's RBI double knocked starter Ray Prim out of the game. Paul Derringer intentionally walked Rudy York before Jimmy Outlaw's groundout and Paul Richards's single scored a run each. The Cubs scored their only run of the game in the sixth when Don Johnson hit a leadoff triple and scored on Peanuts Lowrey's groundout. The series was now tied 2–2.

=== Game 5 ===
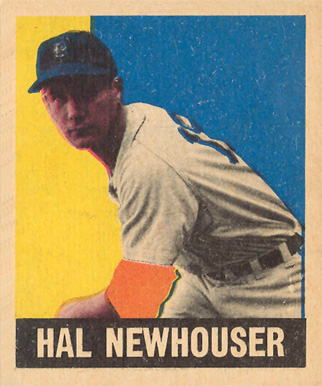
Hal Newhouser

Sunday, October 7, 1945 1:30 pm (CT) at Wrigley Field in Chicago, Illinois
Team	1	2	3	4	5	6	7	8	9	R	H	E
Detroit	0	0	1	0	0	4	1	0	2	8	11	0
Chicago	0	0	1	0	0	0	2	0	1	4	7	2
WP: Hal Newhouser (1–1) LP: Hank Borowy (1–1)

Back in form, Hal Newhouser went the distance for Detroit, striking out nine. The Tigers struck first in the top of the third on Doc Cramer's sacrifice fly with runners on first and third, but the Cubs tied the game in the bottom half when Hank Borowy doubled with two outs and scored on Stan Hack's single. In the sixth, Cramer hit a leadoff single and scored on Hank Greenberg's double. After a single, Rudy York's RBI single knocked starter Hank Borowy out of the game. Hy Vandenberg in relief intentionally walked Paul Richards with one out to load the bases before a walk to Newhouser and Skeeter Webb's groundout scored a run each. Next inning, Jimmy Outlaw's sacrifice fly with runners on first and third off Paul Derringer made it 6–1 Tigers. In the bottom of the inning, with runners on first and third with two outs, Bill Nicholson's fielder's choice and Mickey Livingston's ground-rule double scored a run each. In the ninth, after a hit-by-pitch and double, Roy Cullenbine's two-run double off Paul Erickson made it 8–3 Tigers. In the bottom half, Phil Cavarretta hit a leadoff double and scored on Nicholson's one out single before Newhouser retired the next two batters to end the game and put the Tigers one win away from the championship. The Cubs' World Series record at Wrigley Field now stood at 1–10.

=== Game 6 ===
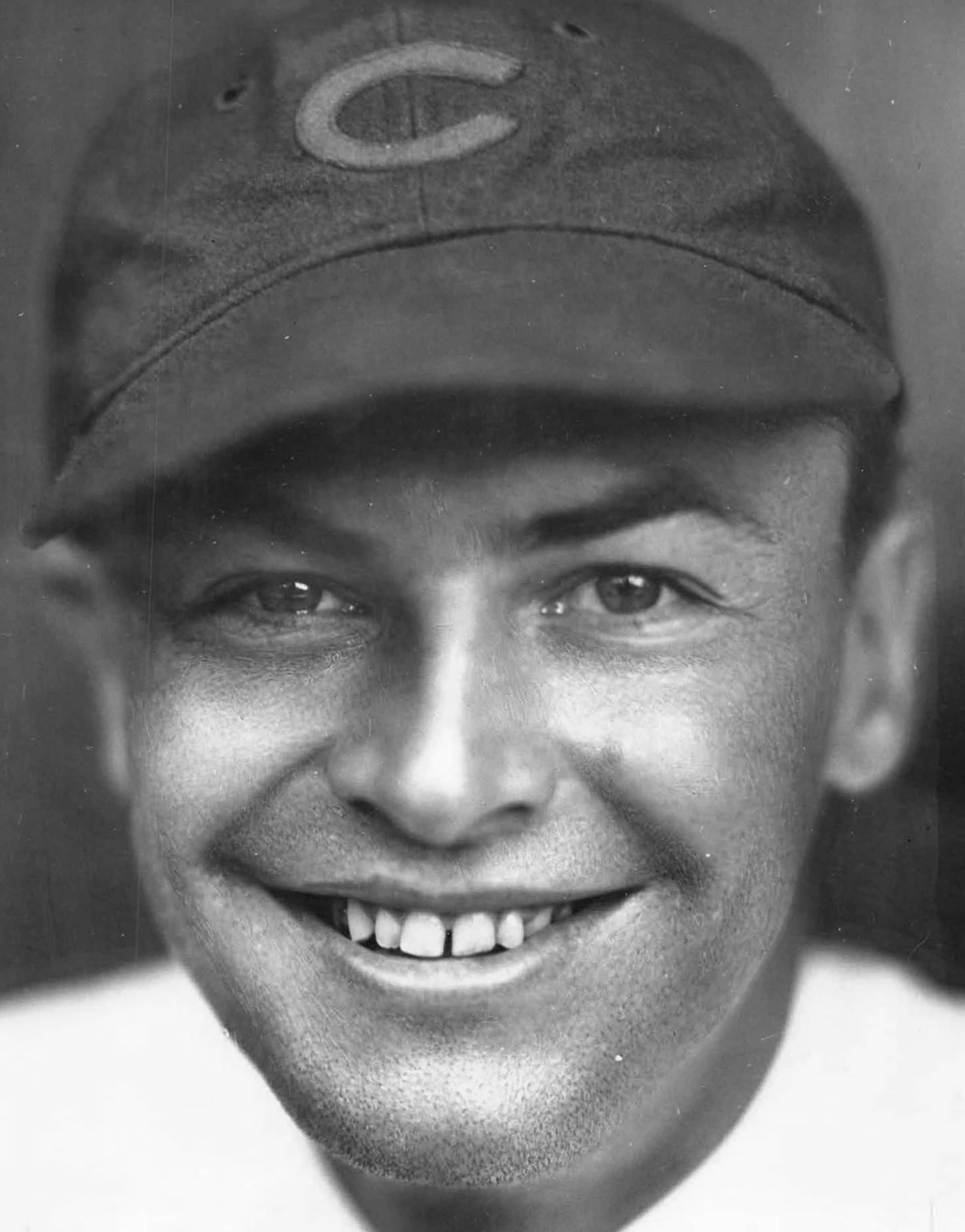
Stan Hack delivered a game-winning double in the last World Series game the Cubs ended up winning for 71 years.

Monday, October 8, 1945 1:30 pm (CT) at Wrigley Field in Chicago, Illinois
Team	1	2	3	4	5	6	7	8	9	10	11	12	R	H	E
Detroit	0	1	0	0	0	0	2	4	0	0	0	0	7	13	1
Chicago	0	0	0	0	4	1	2	0	0	0	0	1	8	15	3
WP: Hank Borowy (2–1) LP: Dizzy Trout (1–1); Home runs: DET: Hank Greenberg (2); CHC: None

In Game 6, the Tigers struck first on a bases-loaded walk to Paul Richards by Claude Passeau in the second. In the fifth with the bases loaded off Virgil Trucks, Stan Hack's two-run single put the Cubs up 2–1. After another walk loaded the bases, Phil Cavarretta's two-run single knocked Trucks out of the game. Back-to-back leadoff doubles next inning by Mickey Livingston and Roy Hughes off Tommy Bridges made it 5–1 Cubs. In the top of the seventh with two on and two outs, RBI singles by Roy Cullenbine off Passeau and Rudy York off Hank Wyse cut the Cubs' lead to 5–3, but they got those runs back in the bottom half on a bases loaded walk to Livingston by Bridges followed by Roy Hughes's RBI single off Al Benton. In the top of the eighth, after a leadoff walk and double, an error on Joe Hoover's ground ball scored a run, then Eddie Mayo's RBI single scored another with Hoover going to third and Mayo being tagged out at second. Ray Prim relieved Wyse and allowed a sacrifice fly to Doc Cramer before Hank Greenberg's home run tied the game. In the 12th, after a one-out single by Frank Secory off Dizzy Trout, pinch-runner Bill Schuster came all the way around on Stan Hack's walk-off double to left, forcing a Game 7.

Besides being the last World Series game the Cubs won until Game 2 in 2016, this would also be the second—and last—World Series game that the Cubs would win before their hometown fans at Wrigley Field, until Game 5 in 2016. The only other Wrigley victory was Game 5 in 1935.

As of 2026, this is still the last postseason walk-off win in Cubs history.

=== Game 7 ===
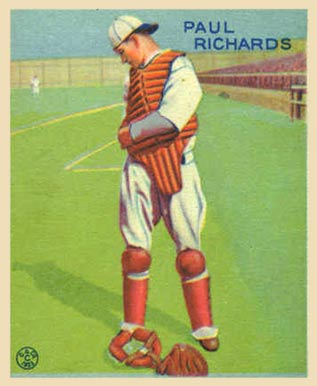
Paul Richards

Wednesday, October 10, 1945 1:30 pm (CT) at Wrigley Field in Chicago, Illinois
Team	1	2	3	4	5	6	7	8	9	R	H	E
Detroit	5	1	0	0	0	0	1	2	0	9	9	1
Chicago	1	0	0	1	0	0	0	1	0	3	10	0
WP: Hal Newhouser (2–1) LP: Hank Borowy (2–2)

The Cubs went with the overworked Borowy, who lasted just three batters, each of whom singled, the last of which scored a run. Paul Derringer replaced him, intentionally walked Roy Cullenbine with one out to load the bases, then one out later, walked Jimmy Outlaw before Paul Richards cleared the bases with a three-run double. The Cubs got a run in the bottom of the first on Phil Cavarretta's RBI single with two on off Hal Newhouser, but in the second, Derringer allowed a two-out single, then three consecutive walks to force in another run. The Cubs got another run in the fourth when Cavaretta singled and scored on Andy Pafko's triple. In the seventh, Cullenbine drew a leadoff walk off Paul Erickson and scored on Paul Richards's two-out double. Next inning, Skeeter Webb drew a leadoff walk off Claude Passeau and scored on Eddie Mayo's double. After moving to third on a groundout, he scored on Hank Greenberg's sacrifice fly. The Cubs scored just one more run in the bottom of the inning on Bill Richardson's RBI double with two on as Newhouser pitched a complete game to give the Tigers the championship. This was the first Game 7 won by the Tigers in franchise history.

The Tigers would not make another World Series appearance until winning it in 1968, while the Cubs would not make the postseason again until 1984 and not appear in another World Series until winning it in 2016.

== Composite box ==
1945 World Series (4–3): Detroit Tigers (A.L.) over Chicago Cubs (N.L.)

Team	1	2	3	4	5	6	7	8	9	10	11	12	R	H	E
Detroit Tigers	5	2	1	4	4	4	4	6	2	0	0	0	32	54	5
Chicago Cubs	5	0	4	4	4	2	7	1	1	0	0	1	29	65	6
Total attendance: 333,457 Average attendance: 47,637; Winning player's share: $6,443 Losing player's share: $3,930

== Aftermath ==
This was the last time the Tigers won the World Series until 1968, where they overcame a 3–1 series deficit to defeat the St. Louis Cardinals in seven games after being nine outs away from elimination in Game 5.

After the series loss, the Cubs entered a decades long slump. In their next four attempts to win a league pennant (1984, 1989, 2003, 2015), the Cubs lost each time. They would not return to the Fall Classic until 2016, where they overcame a 3–1 series deficit against the Cleveland Indians and won in seven games after being taken to extra innings in Game 7, ending a 108-year championship drought.

== See also ==
- 1945 Negro World Series
- Curse of the Billy Goat
