= Pittsburgh Pirates all-time roster =

This list is complete and up-to-date as of April 10, 2025.

The following is a list of players, both past and current, who appeared at least in one game for the Pittsburgh Pirates National League franchise (1891–present), previously known as the Pittsburgh Alleghenys (1882–1890).

Players in Bold are members of the National Baseball Hall of Fame.

Players in Italics have had their numbers retired by the team.

== A ==
- Ed Abbaticchio
- Cal Abrams
- Bill Abstein
- Ed Acosta
- Babe Adams
- Sparky Adams
- Spencer Adams
- Bob Addis
- Darío Agrazal
- Ed Albosta
- Vic Aldridge
- Gary Alexander
- Matt Alexander
- Anthony Alford
- Cam Alldred
- Greg Allen
- Jermaine Allensworth
- Gene Alley
- Gair Allie
- Bill Almon
- Matty Alou
- Moisés Alou
- Jesse Altenburg
- El Potro Álvarez
- Pedro Álvarez
- Alfredo Amézaga
- Alf Anderson
- Goat Anderson
- Jimmy Anderson
- Tanner Anderson
- Tyler Anderson
- Miguel Andújar
- Chris Archer
- Jimmy Archer
- Tony Armas
- Tony Armas Jr.
- Bronson Arroyo
- Luis Arroyo
- José Ascanio
- Braxton Ashcraft
- Toby Atwell
- Rich Aude
- Dave Augustine
- Bruce Aven
- John Axford

== B ==
- Wally Backman
- Ji-hwan Bae
- Jim Bagby Jr.
- Jim Bagby Sr.
- Ed Bahr
- Bob Bailey
- Doug Bair
- Doug Baird
- Bill Baker
- Gene Baker
- Kirtley Baker
- Mark Baldwin
- Jeff Ballard
- Anthony Banda
- Jeff Banister
- Manny Bañuelos
- Rod Barajas
- Walter Barbare
- Johnny Barbato
- Jap Barbeau
- Dave Barbee
- Hunter Barco
- Andy Barkett
- Clint Barmes
- Eppie Barnes
- Ed Barney
- Clyde Barnhart
- Vic Barnhart
- Steven Baron
- Dick Barone
- Frank Barrett
- Johnny Barrett
- Joey Bart
- Dick Bartell
- Jimmy Barthmaier
- Les Bartholomew
- Tony Bartirome
- Monty Basgall
- Tyler Bashlor
- Eddie Basinski
- Brian Bass
- Antonio Bastardo
- Miguel Batista
- Bill Batsch
- Russ Bauers
- Ross Baumgarten
- Denny Bautista
- José Bautista
- Jason Bay
- Jonah Bayliss
- Bob Beall
- T. J. Beam
- Trey Beamon
- Ted Beard
- Ginger Beaumont
- Boom-Boom Beck
- Beals Becker
- **Jake Beckley**
- Érik Bédard
- Andy Bednar
- David Bednar
- Tyler Beede
- Jalen Beeks
- Hank Behrman
- Joe Beimel
- Stan Belinda
- Bo Belinsky
- Bill Bell
- Derek Bell
- Fern Bell
- Gus Bell
- Jay Bell
- Josh Bell
- Rafael Belliard
- Mike Benjamin
- Fred Bennett
- Joaquín Benoit
- Kris Benson
- John Beradino
- Clarence Berger
- Tun Berger
- Carlos Bernier
- Dale Berra
- Ray Berres
- Kurt Bevacqua
- Jim Bibby
- Osvaldo Bido
- Brandan Bidois
- Mike Bielecki
- Lou Bierbauer
- Steve Bieser
- Carson Bigbee
- Lyle Bigbee
- Dann Bilardello
- Ralph Birkofer
- Rivington Bisland
- Brian Bixler
- Vic Black
- Earl Blackburn
- Ron Blackburn
- Fred Blackwell
- Sheriff Blake
- Homer Blankenship
- Cy Blanton
- Joe Blanton
- Steve Blass
- Jimmy Bloodworth
- **Bert Blyleven**
- Eddie Bockman
- Tony Boeckel
- George Boehler
- Brian Boehringer
- Joe Boever
- Pat Bohen
- Cody Bolton
- Barry Bonds
- Tiny Bonham
- Bobby Bonilla
- Everett Booe
- Al Bool
- Lute Boone
- Chris Bootcheck
- Frank Bork
- John Bormann
- Hank Borowy
- Ryan Borucki
- Wilfredo Boscán
- Don Bosch
- Christopher Bostick
- Frank Bowerman
- John Bowker
- Joe Bowman
- Roger Bowman
- Jason Boyd
- Doe Boyland
- Eddie Boyle
- King Brady
- Dave Brain
- Erv Brame
- Ron Brand
- Chick Brandom
- Bill Brandt
- Ed Brandt
- Kitty Bransfield
- Steven Brault
- Sid Bream
- Sam Brenegan
- Bill Brenzel
- Ken Brett
- Austin Brice
- Fred Brickell
- Bunny Brief
- Harry Bright
- Nelson Briles
- Chuck Brinkman
- Gil Britton
- Steve Brodie
- Frank Brooks
- Frank Brosseau
- Tony Brottem
- Adrian Brown
- Brant Brown
- Dusty Brown
- Emil Brown
- Jimmy Brown
- Mace Brown
- Mike Brown
- Myrl Brown
- Earl Browne
- Pete Browning
- Keon Broxton
- Bill Brubaker
- JT Brubaker
- Justin Bruihl
- Jacob Brumfield
- George Brunet
- Steve Brye
- John Buck
- Steve Buechele
- Scott Bullett
- Bryan Bullington
- **Jim Bunning**
- Nick Burdi
- Smoky Burgess
- Eddie Burke
- Jimmy Burke
- A. J. Burnett
- Sean Burnett
- Jeromy Burnitz
- Tom Burns
- Brian Burres
- Mike Burrows
- Bill Burwell
- Bullet Joe Bush
- Guy Bush
- Max Butcher
- Art Butler
- Tom Butters
- Marlon Byrd
- Bobby Byrne

== C ==
- Génesis Cabrera
- Melky Cabrera
- Trevor Cahill
- Ernie Camacho
- Fred Cambria
- Hank Camelli
- Arquimedes Caminero
- Harry Camnitz
- Howie Camnitz
- Kid Camp
- Jim Campanis
- Marc Campbell
- Vin Campbell
- Alexander Canario
- John Candelaria
- John Cangelosi
- Chris Cannizzaro
- Matt Capps
- Vinny Capra
- Ralph Capron
- Bernie Carbo
- Don Cardwell
- **Max Carey**
- Bobby Cargo
- Fred Carisch
- Don Carlsen
- Hal Carlson
- Paul Carpenter
- Frank Carpin
- Lew Carr
- D. J. Carrasco
- Clay Carroll
- Fred Carroll
- Steve Carter
- Charlie Case
- Hugh Casey
- Sean Casey
- Dave Cash
- Harry Cassady
- Jack Cassini
- Pete Castiglione
- Diego Castillo
- José Castillo
- Rodolfo Castro
- Howdy Caton
- Ronny Cedeño
- Blake Cederlind
- Francisco Cervelli
- Shawn Chacón
- Leon Chagnon
- Cliff Chambers
- Bubba Chandler
- Yu Chang
- Aroldis Chapman
- Jesse Chavez
- Raúl Chávez
- Michael Chavis
- Tsung-Che Cheng
- Tom Cheney
- **Jack Chesbro**
- Bob Chesnes
- Ji-man Choi
- Jason Christiansen
- Joe Christopher
- Ryan Church
- Chuck Churn
- Gino Cimoli
- Pedro Ciriaco
- Anthony Claggett
- Bill Clancy
- Dave Clark
- Willie Clark
- **Fred Clarke**
- Nig Clarke
- Stu Clarke
- Bill Clemensen
- Jeff Clement
- **Roberto Clemente**
- Pat Clements
- Donn Clendenon
- Gene Clines
- Billy Clingman
- Brad Clontz
- Otis Clymer
- Phil Coke
- Tom Colcolough
- Alex Cole
- Dick Cole
- Gerrit Cole
- King Cole
- Victor Cole
- Bob Coleman
- Joe Coleman
- Darnell Coles
- Lou Collier
- Zack Collins
- Zip Collins
- Frank Colman
- Dick Colpaert
- Adam Comorosky
- Pete Compton
- Ralph Comstock
- Onix Concepción
- Dick Conger
- Wid Conroy
- José Contreras
- Roansy Contreras
- Joe Conzelman
- Dale Coogan
- Billy Cook
- Steve Cooke
- Duff Cooley
- Walker Cooper
- Wilbur Cooper
- John Corcoran
- Wil Cordero
- Francisco Córdova
- Mark Corey
- Pop Corkhill
- Kevin Correia
- Pete Coscarart
- Dan Costello
- Humberto Cota
- Ensign Cottrell
- Billy Cox
- Danny Cox
- Will Craig
- Del Crandall
- Kyle Crick
- Fred Crolius
- Jack Cronin
- **Joe Cronin**
- Bobby Crosby
- Monte Cross
- Michael Crotta
- Wil Crowe
- Iván Cruz
- Juan Cruz
- Luis Cruz
- Oneil Cruz
- Víctor Cruz
- Cookie Cuccurullo
- Bud Culloton
- Midre Cummings
- Brandon Cumpton
- Gene Curtis
- Harvey Cushman
- George Cutshaw
- **Kiki Cuyler**
- Mike Cvengros

== D ==
- Jeff D'Amico
- Chase d'Arnaud
- Babe Dahlgren
- Bruce Dal Canton
- Bennie Daniels
- Michael Darrell-Hicks
- Danny Darwin
- Harry Daubert
- Vic Davalillo
- David Davidson
- Austin Davis
- Brandy Davis
- Butch Davis
- Dick Davis
- Harry Davis
- Henry Davis
- Ike Davis
- J. J. Davis
- Jason Davis
- Lefty Davis
- Rajai Davis
- Ron Davis
- Rookie Davis
- Spud Davis
- Taylor Davis
- Trench Davis
- Joe Dawson
- Chase De Jong
- Bryan De La Cruz
- Enyel De Los Santos
- Yerry De Los Santos
- Adam DeBus
- Yurendell DeCaster
- Harry Decker
- Jaff Decker
- Bobby Del Greco
- Miguel Del Pozo
- Tom Delahanty
- Jason Delay
- José DeLeón
- Larry Demery
- Gene DeMontreville
- Con Dempsey
- Elmer Dessens
- Orestes Destrade
- Tom Dettore
- Cam Devanney
- Mark Dewey
- Argenis Díaz
- Elías Díaz
- Matt Diaz
- Mike Diaz
- Robinzon Díaz
- Corey Dickerson
- Johnny Dickshot
- Murry Dickson
- Ernie Diehl
- Dutch Dietz
- Wilmer Difo
- Bob Dillinger
- Frank Dillon
- Miguel Diloné
- Vince DiMaggio
- Benny Distefano
- Ona Dodd
- Ed Doheny
- Cozy Dolan
- Jiggs Donahue
- Mike Donlin
- Brendan Donnelly
- Jim Donnelly
- Lino Donoso
- Patsy Donovan
- Jerry Dorsey
- Octavio Dotel
- Wilber Dotel
- Jim Dougherty
- Whammy Douglas
- Ryan Doumit
- Kip Dowd
- Doug Drabek
- Tim Drummond
- Clise Dudley
- Bernie Duffy
- Chris Duffy
- Gus Dugas
- Bill Duggleby
- Zach Duke
- Phil Dumatrait
- Pat Duncan
- Jim Dunn
- Mike Dunne
- Shawon Dunston
- Montana DuRapau
- Blaine Durbin
- Erv Dusak
- Jerry Dybzinski
- Duffy Dyer
- Mike Dyer
- Jarrod Dyson

== E ==
- Bill Eagan
- Truck Eagan
- Billy Earle
- Mike Easler
- Logan Easley
- Jack Easton
- Eddie Eayrs
- Stump Edington
- Mike Edwards (2B)
- Mike Edwards (3B)
- Red Ehret
- Jerad Eickhoff
- Brad Eldred
- Roy Ellam
- Larry Elliot
- Bob Elliott
- Dock Ellis
- Jake Elmore
- Kevin Elster
- Bones Ely
- Angelo Encarnación
- Charlie Engle
- Jewel Ens
- Aubrey Epps
- John Ericks
- Ralph Erickson
- Robbie Erlin
- Luis Escobar
- Duke Esper
- Cecil Espy
- Bill Evans
- Phillip Evans
- Dana Eveland

== F ==
- Roy Face
- Héctor Fajardo
- Cy Falkenberg
- Pete Falsey
- Bailey Falter
- Stan Fansler
- Jack Farmer
- Kyle Farnsworth
- Duke Farrell
- Brady Feigl
- Michael Feliz
- Neftalí Feliz
- Caleb Ferguson
- Félix Fermín
- Ed Fernandes
- Junior Fernández
- Nanny Fernandez
- Jack Ferry
- Mike Fetters
- Jocko Fields
- Cole Figueroa
- Luis Figueroa
- Nelson Figueroa
- Hal Finney
- William Fischer
- Brian Fisher
- Harry Fisher
- Wilbur Fisher
- Ed Fitz Gerald
- Ira Flagstead
- Patsy Flaherty
- Steamer Flanagan
- Josh Fleming
- Les Fleming
- Aaron Fletcher
- Elbie Fletcher
- Don Flinn
- Rafael Flores
- Pedro Florimón
- John Flynn
- Josh Fogg
- Lee Fohl
- Hank Foiles
- Tom Foley
- Tim Foli
- Dee Fondy
- Jim Foor
- Brownie Foreman
- Terry Forster
- Larry Foss
- Dustin Fowler
- George Fox
- Earl Francis
- Adam Frazier
- Todd Frazier
- David Freese
- Gene Freese
- George Freese
- Jim Fregosi
- Larry French
- Bob Friend
- Ernesto Frieri
- Doug Frobel
- Sam Frock
- Eric Fryer
- Woodie Fryman
- J. J. Furmaniak
- Fred Fussell

== G ==
- Ken Gables
- Sean Gallagher
- Pud Galvin
- Ben Gamel
- Bob Ganley
- Gussie Gannon
- John Ganzel
- Joe Garagiola
- Bob Garber
- Gene Garber
- Carlos García
- Freddy García
- Jhostynxon García
- Miguel García
- Mike Garcia
- Harry Gardner
- Jim Gardner
- Debs Garms
- Phil Garner
- Cito Gaston
- Hank Gastright
- Huck Geary
- Johnny Gee
- John Gelnar
- Frank Genins
- Wally Gerber
- Al Gerheauser
- Domingo Germán
- Lou Gertenrich
- Jody Gerut
- Gus Getz
- Joe Gibbon
- George Gibson
- Kirk Gibson
- Brett Gideon
- Paul Giel
- Jack Gilbert
- Brian Giles
- Warren Gill
- Sam Gillen
- Len Gilmore
- Al Gionfriddo
- Dave Giusti
- Tyler Glasnow
- Jack Glasscock
- Whitey Glazner
- Billy Gleason
- Jerry Don Gleaton
- Jot Goar
- José Godoy
- Jerry Goff
- Chuck Goggin
- Chris Gomez
- Jeanmar Gómez
- Jesse Gonder
- Marco Gonzales
- Nick Gonzales
- Denny González
- Erik González
- Fernando González
- José González
- Mike Gonzalez
- Johnny Gooch
- Sid Gordon
- Hank Gornicki
- Matt Gorski
- Tom Gorzelanny
- Howie Goss
- **Goose Gossage**
- Phil Gosselin
- Julio Gotay
- Jim Gott
- John Grabow
- Earl Grace
- Yasmani Grandal
- Jeff Granger
- George Grant
- Mudcat Grant
- George Grantham
- Bill Gray
- Chummy Gray
- Jim Gray
- Stan Gray
- Chris Green
- Fred Green
- **Hank Greenberg**
- Hal Gregg
- Tommy Gregg
- Reddy Grey
- Konnor Griffin
- Tom Griffin
- Jason Grilli
- **Burleigh Grimes**
- Charlie Grimm
- Dick Groat
- Heinie Groh
- Howdy Groskloss
- Don Gross
- Al Grunwald
- Cecilio Guante
- Deolis Guerra
- José Guillén
- Ben Guintini
- Ad Gumbert
- Billy Gumbert
- Harry Gumbert
- Frankie Gustine
- Don Gutteridge

== H ==
- Yamid Haad
- Mule Haas
- Eric Hacker
- Harvey Haddix
- Bill Haeffner
- Bud Hafey
- Matt Hague
- Jerry Hairston Sr.
- Albert Hall
- Bill Hall
- Bob Hall
- Dick Hall
- Jack Hallett
- Newt Halliday
- Bill Hallman
- Dave Hamilton
- Earl Hamilton
- Ken Hamlin
- Luke Hamlin
- Jack Hammond
- Lee Hancock
- Lee Handley
- Ned Hanlon
- Joel Hanrahan
- Greg Hansell
- Craig Hansen
- Alen Hanson
- J. A. Happ
- Gary Hargis
- Charlie Hargreaves
- Bob Harmon
- Brian Harper
- Terry Harper
- Ray Harrell
- Thomas Harrington
- Bill Harris
- Joe Harris
- Josh Harrison
- Bill Hart
- Corey Hart
- Kevin Hart
- Chuck Hartenstein
- Geoff Hartlieb
- Fred Hartman
- Andy Hassler
- Charlie Hastings
- Thomas Hatch
- Billy Hatcher
- Pink Hawley
- Charlie Hayes
- Ke'Bryan Hayes
- Andrew Heaney
- Neal Heaton
- Wally Hebert
- Richie Hebner
- Adeiny Hechavarria
- Guy Hecker
- Austin Hedges
- Tyler Heineman
- Ken Heintzelman
- Ben Heller
- Tommy Helms
- Heath Hembree
- Rollie Hemsley
- George Hendrick
- Claude Hendrix
- Gail Henley
- Bill Henry
- Guillermo Heredia
- Babe Herman
- **Billy Herman**
- Chad Hermansen
- Gene Hermanski
- Alex Hernández
- Gorkys Hernández
- Jackie Hernández
- José Hernández (IF)
- José Hernández(P)
- Ramón Hernández
- Roberto Hernández
- Yoslan Herrera
- Art Herring
- Johnny Hetki
- Jake Hewitt
- Kirby Higbe
- Bobby Hill
- Carmen Hill
- Rich Hill
- Homer Hillebrand
- Chuck Hiller
- Mack Hillis
- Bill Hinchman
- Eric Hinske
- Don Hoak
- Bill Hoffer
- Jesse Hoffmeister
- Solly Hofman
- Cal Hogue
- Colin Holderman
- John Holdzkom
- Al Holland
- Derek Holland
- Ed Holley
- Bonnie Hollingsworth
- Clay Holmes
- Brock Holt
- Brent Honeywell Jr.
- Wally Hood
- John Hope
- Mike Hopkins
- Johnny Hopp
- Jim Hopper
- Elmer Horton
- Spencer Horwitz
- Dave Hostetler
- J. R. House
- Del Howard
- Lee Howard
- Sam Howard
- Art Howe
- Dixie Howell
- Bill Howerton
- Waite Hoyt
- Daniel Hudson
- Bill Hughes
- Jared Hughes
- Jim Hughey
- Mark Huismann
- Brian Hunter
- Newt Hunter
- Bert Husting
- Drew Hutchison
- Ham Hyatt
- Adam Hyzdu

== I ==
- Brandon Inge
- Mel Ingram
- Phil Irwin
- Travis Ishikawa
- Akinori Iwamura
- César Izturis

== J ==
- Al Jackson
- Andre Jackson
- Charlie Jackson
- Danny Jackson
- Grant Jackson
- Steven Jackson
- Elmer Jacobs
- Spook Jacobs
- Chris Jakubauskas
- Vic Janowicz
- Jason Jaramillo
- Roy Jarvis
- John Jaso
- Daulton Jefferies
- Jesse Jefferson
- Woody Jensen
- Williams Jerez
- Johnny Jeter
- Sam Jethroe
- Houston Jiménez
- Juan Jiménez
- Manny Jiménez
- Connor Joe
- Bob Johnson
- Dave Johnson
- Jason Johnson
- Kris Johnson
- Lloyd Johnson
- Mark Johnson
- Doc Johnston
- Joel Johnston
- Mike Johnston
- Rex Johnston
- Barry Jones
- Cobe Jones
- Garrett Jones
- Jared Jones
- Odell Jones
- Percy Jones
- Tim Jones
- Bubber Jonnard
- Harry Jordan
- Corban Joseph
- Matt Joyce
- Walt Judnich
- Red Juelich
- Ken Jungels

== K ==
- Jack Kading
- Jake Kafora
- Frank Kalin
- Jim Kane
- Jung-ho Kang
- Erv Kantlehner
- Ed Karger
- Jeff Karstens
- Matt Kata
- Bill Keen
- Keone Kela
- Mickey Keliher
- Kyle Keller
- Mitch Keller
- Joe Kelley
- Antwone Kelly
- Billy Kelly
- Don Kelly
- **George Kelly**
- Herb Kelly
- Jim Kelly
- Joe Kelly
- Billy Kelsey
- Steve Kemp
- Jason Kendall
- Brickyard Kennedy
- Sam Khalifa
- Pat Kilhullen
- Frank Killen
- Isiah Kiner-Falefa
- **Ralph Kiner**
- Jeff King
- Lee King
- Nellie King
- Silver King
- Mike Kingery
- Nick Kingham
- Ed Kinsella
- Tom Kinslow
- Bob Kipper
- Ed Kirkpatrick
- Bruce Kison
- **Chuck Klein**
- Ron Kline
- Bob Klinger
- Ted Kluszewski
- Clyde Kluttz
- Otto Knabe
- Andrew Knapp
- Phil Knell
- Cliff Knox
- Nick Koback
- Grant Koch
- Dan Kolb
- Gary Kolb
- Fred Kommers
- Ed Konetchy
- George Kontos
- Dennis Konuszewski
- George Kopacz
- Clem Koshorek
- Bill Koski
- Lou Koupal
- Kevin Kramer
- Randy Kramer
- Max Kranick
- Erik Kratz
- Danny Kravitz
- Ray Krawczyk
- Ray Kremer
- Otto Krueger
- Chad Kuhl
- Charlie Kuhns
- Earl Kunz
- Masumi Kuwata
- Bob Kuzava

== L ==
- Clem Labine
- Lee Lacy
- Hi Ladd
- Bobby LaFromboise
- Fred Lake
- Tim Laker
- Dan Lally
- Jack Lamabe
- John Lamb
- Andrew Lambo
- Dennis Lamp
- Dick Lanahan
- Bill Landrum
- Marty Lang
- Rick Langford
- Rimp Lanier
- Johnny Lanning
- Paul LaPalme
- Dave LaPoint
- Adam LaRoche
- Andy LaRoche
- Sam LaRocque
- Tacks Latimer
- Cookie Lavagetto
- Mike LaValliere
- Ryan Lavarnway
- Vance Law
- Vern Law
- Justin Lawrence
- Sean Lawrence
- Matt Lawton
- Herman Layne
- Tommy Leach
- Tom Leahy
- Jack Leathersich
- Wade LeBlanc
- Wil Ledezma
- Cliff Lee
- Derrek Lee
- Mark Lee
- Watty Lee
- Sam Leever
- Lefty Leifield
- Ed Leip
- Larry LeJeune
- Johnnie LeMaster
- Joe Leonard
- Don Leppert
- Chris Leroux
- Sixto Lezcano
- Jon Lieber
- Brad Lincoln
- Mike Lincoln
- José Lind
- Josh Lindblom
- Johnny Lindell
- **Freddie Lindstrom**
- Bob Linton
- Francisco Liriano
- Nelson Liriano
- Scott Little
- Dick Littlefield
- Radhames Liz
- Abel Lizotte
- Esteban Loaiza
- Hans Lobert
- Kyle Lobstein
- Jeff Locke
- Kenny Lofton
- Johnny Logan
- Alberto Lois
- Rich Loiselle
- Vic Lombardi
- Steve Lombardozzi Jr.
- Bob Long
- Dale Long
- **Al López**
- Javier López
- Mendy López
- Scott Loucks
- Tom Lovelace
- Bobby Lowe
- Brandon Lowe
- Sean Lowe
- Red Lucas
- Frank Luce
- Ryan Ludwick
- Cory Luebke
- Wild Bill Luhrsen
- Del Lundgren
- Al Luplow
- Jordan Luplow
- Jordan Lyles
- Jerry Lynch
- Mike Lynch
- Al Lyons
- Denny Lyons
- Tyler Lyons

== M ==
- Bill Macdonald
- Danny MacFayden
- Ken Macha
- Connie Mack
- Rob Mackowiak
- Gene Madden
- Morris Madden
- Nick Maddox
- Mike Maddux
- Art Madison
- Bill Madlock
- Bligh Madris
- Harl Maggert
- Drew Maggi
- Jack Maguire
- Roy Mahaffey
- Mickey Mahler
- Paul Maholm
- Pat Mahomes
- Woody Main
- Carlos Maldonado
- Al Mamaux
- Jim Mangan
- Ángel Mangual
- Jim Mann
- Lou Manske
- **Heinie Manush**
- Josías Manzanillo
- Ravelo Manzanillo
- **Rabbit Maranville**
- Tucupita Marcano
- Jhan Mariñez
- Jake Marisnick
- Parker Markel
- Lou Marone
- Luis Márquez
- Jim Marshall
- Joe Marshall
- Dámaso Marte
- Kelvin Marte
- Starling Marte
- Al Martin
- Jason Martin
- Paul Martin
- Russell Martin
- Stu Martin
- Carmelo Martínez
- Javier Martínez
- Joe Martinez
- José Martínez
- Manny Martínez
- Michael Martínez
- Ramón Martínez
- James Marvel
- Phil Masi
- Roger Mason
- Rubén Mateo
- Mark Mathias
- Gary Matthews Jr.
- Isaac Mattson
- Jim Mattox
- Gene Mauch
- Dal Maxvill
- Bert Maxwell
- Buckshot May
- Darrell May
- Dave May
- Jerry May
- Milt May
- Erskine Mayer
- Tim Mayza
- **Bill Mazeroski**
- Vin Mazzaro
- Lee Mazzilli
- Dixie McArthur
- Ike McAuley
- Al McBean
- George McBride
- Windy McCall
- Alex McCarthy
- Jack McCarthy
- Tom McCarthy
- Pete McClanahan
- Lloyd McClendon
- Moose McCormick
- Tom McCreery
- Clyde McCullough
- Jeff McCurry
- Andrew McCutchen
- Daniel McCutchen
- James McDonald
- John McDonald
- Sam McDowell
- Will McEnaney
- Chappie McFarland
- Orlando McFarlane
- Casey McGehee
- Irish McIlveen
- Stuffy McInnis
- **Bill McKechnie**
- Jim McKee
- Michael McKenry
- Billy McKinney
- Tony McKnight
- Warren McLaughlin
- Marty McLeary
- Cal McLish
- Nate McLouth
- Jack McMahan
- Tom McNamara
- Jerry McNertney
- Kyle McPherson
- George McQuillan
- Alex McRae
- Larry McWilliams
- Johnny Meador
- Austin Meadows
- Brian Meadows
- Lee Meadows
- Pat Meares
- Nick Mears
- Doc Medich
- Scott Medvin
- Evan Meek
- Jouett Meekin
- Dutch Meier
- Heine Meine
- Román Mejías
- Mark Melancon
- Mario Mendoza
- Jock Menefee
- Tony Menéndez
- Ed Mensor
- Orlando Merced
- Jack Mercer
- Jordy Mercer
- Art Merewether
- Bill Merritt
- George Merritt
- Jack Merson
- José Mesa
- Catfish Metkovich
- Dan Miceli
- Gene Michael
- Jason Michaels
- Doug Mientkiewicz
- Pete Mikkelsen
- Johnny Miljus
- Lastings Milledge
- Bill Miller
- Bob Miller
- Doggie Miller
- Dots Miller
- Frank Miller
- Jake Miller
- Paul Miller
- Ray Miller
- Roscoe Miller
- Shelby Miller
- Ward Miller
- Randy Milligan
- John Milner
- Blas Minor
- Jim Minshall
- Cal Mitchell
- Mike Mitchell
- Wilmer Mizell
- Carmen Mlodzinski
- Danny Moeller
- Dennis Moeller
- Johnny Mokan
- Fritz Mollwitz
- Raúl Mondesí
- Craig Monroe
- Willie Montañez
- Felipe Montemayor
- Eddie Moore
- Frank Moore
- Gene Moore
- Bob Moose
- Colin Moran
- Sam Moran
- Brent Morel
- Ramón Morel
- Lew Moren
- Omar Moreno
- Dauri Moreta
- Nyjer Morgan
- John Morlan
- Justin Morneau
- Max Moroff
- Bryan Morris
- Matt Morris
- Warren Morris
- Jim Morrison
- Johnny Morrison
- Phil Morrison
- Michael Morse
- Charlie Morton
- Walt Moryn
- Paul Moskau
- Daniel Moskos
- Jim Mosolf
- Brandon Moss
- Manny Mota
- Mike Mowrey
- Ray Mueller
- Walter Mueller
- Joe Muir
- Hugh Mulcahy
- Terry Mulholland
- Eddie Mulligan
- Bob Muncrief
- Red Munger
- Eddie Murphy
- John Ryan Murphy
- Leo Murphy
- Morgan Murphy
- Danny Murtaugh
- Joe Musgrove

== N ==
- Xavier Nady
- Judge Nagle
- Steve Nagy
- Cholly Naranjo
- Pete Naton
- Yamaico Navarro
- Denny Neagle
- Joe Nealon
- Ron Necciai
- Cal Neeman
- Cy Neighbors
- Jim Nelson
- Rocky Nelson
- Dovydas Neverauskas
- John Newell
- Kevin Newman
- Gift Ngoepe
- Juan Nicasio
- Chet Nichols Sr.
- Fred Nicholson
- Ovid Nicholson
- George Nicol
- Kyle Nicolas
- Steve Nicosia
- Al Niehaus
- Randy Niemann
- Jon Niese
- Bill Niles
- Jayson Nix
- Junior Noboa
- John Nogowski
- Red Nonnenkamp
- Wayne Nordhagen
- Nelson Norman
- Iván Nova
- Abraham Núñez

== O ==
- Ken Oberkfell
- Eddie O'Brien
- John O'Brien
- Johnny O'Brien
- Ray O'Brien
- Tom O'Brien
- Tommy O'Brien
- Danny O'Connell
- John O'Connell
- Brian O'Connor
- Jack O'Connor
- Paddy O'Connor
- Billy O'Dell
- George O'Donnell
- Ryan O'Hearn
- Ross Ohlendorf
- Red Oldham
- Bob Oldis
- Jared Oliva
- Edward Olivares
- Omar Olivares
- Al Oliver
- Bob Oliver
- Joe Oliver
- Diomedes Olivo
- Garrett Olson
- Tony Ordeñana
- Joe Orsulak
- Danny Ortiz
- Junior Ortiz
- Luis Ortiz
- Bob Osborn
- Wayne Osborne
- Keith Osik
- Franquelis Osoria
- Fritz Ostermueller
- José Osuna
- Bill Otey
- Amos Otis
- Marty O'Toole
- Ed Ott
- Dave Otto
- Lyle Overbay
- Connor Overton
- Johan Oviedo
- Luis Oviedo
- Bob Owchinko
- Hunter Owen
- Chris Owings
- Marcell Ozuna

== P ==
- Dick Padden
- Tom Padden
- Kevin Padlo
- Dave Pagan
- José Pagán
- Joe Page
- Mitchell Page
- Jim Pagliaroni
- Matt Pagnozzi
- Joshua Palacios
- Vicente Palacios
- Frank Papish
- Mark Parent
- Chan Ho Park
- Hoy Park
- Dave Parker
- Jay Parker
- José Parra
- Steve Parris
- Lance Parrish
- Tom Parsons
- Curtis Partch
- Claude Passeau
- Freddie Patek
- Bob Patterson
- Daryl Patterson
- Xavier Paul
- Ronny Paulino
- Harley Payne
- Steve Pearce
- Al Pedrique
- Red Peery
- Liover Peguero
- Steve Pegues
- Heinie Peitz
- Eddie Pellagrini
- Alejandro Peña
- Hipólito Peña
- Orlando Peña
- Tony Peña
- Jim Pendleton
- Hayden Penn
- Will Pennyfeather
- Laurin Pepper
- Ángel Perdomo
- George Perez
- Juan Pérez
- Martín Pérez
- Michael Pérez
- Óliver Pérez
- Pascual Pérez
- Roberto Pérez
- Chris Peters
- Dillon Peters
- Harding Peterson
- Mark Petkovsek
- Paul Pettit
- Jesse Petty
- Jeff Pfeffer
- Jack Pfiester
- Tommy Pham
- Babe Phelps
- Ed Phelps
- Josh Phelps
- Deacon Phillippe
- Eddie Phillips
- Jack Phillips
- Jason Phillips
- Zach Phillips
- Val Picinich
- Félix Pie
- Bill Pierro
- Tony Piet
- Stolmy Pimentel
- Jake Pitler
- Juan Pizarro
- Elmo Plaskett
- Dan Plesac
- Ray Poat
- Johnny Podgajny
- Gregory Polanco
- Kevin Polcovich
- Howie Pollet
- Cody Ponce
- Elmer Ponder
- Ed Poole
- Paul Popovich
- Sean Poppen
- Bob Porterfield
- Bill Powell
- Ross Powell
- Ted Power
- John Powers
- Alex Presley
- Bob Priddy
- Quinn Priester
- Tom Prince
- Buddy Pritchard
- Alfonso Pulido
- Bob Purkey

== Q ==
- Chad Qualls
- Mel Queen
- Rey Quiñones
- José Quintana

== R ==
- Marv Rackley
- Roberto Clemente
- Jack Rafter
- Tanner Rainey
- Pep Rambert
- Alex Ramírez
- Aramis Ramírez
- Yefry Ramírez
- Yohan Ramírez
- Pedro Ramos
- Dick Rand
- Joe Randa
- Willie Randolph
- Johnny Rawlings
- Johnny Ray
- Curt Raydon
- Harry Raymond
- John Raynor
- Britt Reames
- Jeff Reboulet
- Joe Redfield
- Mark Redman
- Tike Redman
- Gary Redus
- Rick Reed
- Pokey Reese
- Bill Regan
- Wally Rehg
- Ryan Reid
- Arch Reilly
- Charlie Reilly
- Pete Reiser
- Heinie Reitz
- Ken Reitz
- Rick Renteria
- Xavier Rescigno
- Chris Resop
- Dino Restelli
- Michael Restovich
- Rick Reuschel
- Jerry Reuss
- Al Reyes
- Dennys Reyes
- Pablo Reyes
- Bryan Reynolds
- Craig Reynolds
- R. J. Reynolds
- Bobby Rhawn
- Billy Rhines
- Rick Rhoden
- Hal Rhyne
- Dennis Ribant
- Hal Rice
- Jeff Richardson
- Joe Rickert
- Marv Rickert
- Dave Ricketts
- Harry Riconda
- Elmer Riddle
- J. T. Riddle
- Johnny Riddle
- Culley Rikard
- Ricardo Rincón
- Armando Ríos
- Yacksel Ríos
- Claude Ritchey
- Todd Ritchie
- Jim Ritz
- Alfonso Rivas
- Luis Rivas
- Carlos Rivera
- Johnny Rizzo
- Curt Roberts
- Dave Roberts (1B)
- Dave Roberts (P)
- Willis Roberts
- Bob Robertson
- Dave Robertson
- Rich Robertson
- Bill Robinson
- Don Robinson
- Hank Robinson
- Jeff Robinson (RP)
- Jeff Robinson (SP)
- Chick Robitaille
- Andre Rodgers
- Bill Rodgers
- Endy Rodríguez
- Josh Rodriguez
- Richard Rodríguez
- Rosario Rodríguez
- Rubén Rodríguez
- Sean Rodriguez
- Wandy Rodríguez
- Preacher Roe
- Mike Roesler
- Wally Roettger
- Brian Rogers
- Jason Rogers
- Ray Rohwer
- Stan Rojek
- Enny Romero
- Enrique Romo
- Jorge Rondón
- Jim Rooker
- Eli Rosebraugh
- David Ross
- Mark Ross
- Jack Rothfuss
- Al Rubeling
- Dave Rucker
- Matt Ruebel
- Dan Runzler
- Scott Ruskin
- Jim Russell
- Reb Russell
- Mark Ryal
- Mike Ryan
- Ryder Ryan

== S ==
- Casey Sadler
- Ray Sadler
- Jim Sadowski
- Tom Saffell
- Vic Saier
- Marino Salas
- Jeff Salazar
- Freddy Sale
- Bill Salkeld
- Jack Saltzgaver
- Jack Salveson
- Roger Samuels
- Ángel Sánchez
- Duaner Sánchez
- Freddy Sanchez
- Gaby Sánchez
- Jonathan Sánchez
- Rómulo Sánchez
- Tony Sanchez
- Cam Sanders
- Reggie Sanders
- Roy Sanders
- Mike Sandlock
- Charlie Sands
- Chance Sanford
- Manny Sanguillén
- Ben Sankey
- Carlos Santana
- Dennis Santana
- Edgar Santana
- Benito Santiago
- Víctor Santos
- Manny Sarmiento
- Mackey Sasser
- Scott Sauerbeck
- Rich Sauveur
- Ted Savage
- Rob Scahill
- Doc Scanlan
- Bobby Schang
- Fritz Scheeren
- Frank Scheibeck
- John Scheneberg
- Hank Schenz
- Jason Schmidt
- Walter Schmidt
- Ducky Schofield
- Pete Schourek
- Pop Schriver
- A. J. Schugel
- Frank Schulte
- Fred Schulte
- Bob Schultz
- Joe Schultz
- Joe Schultz Jr.
- Jeff Schulz
- Bill Schuster
- Don Schwall
- Jack Scott
- Pete Scott
- Rod Scurry
- Jimmy Sebring
- Colin Selby
- Sonny Senerchia
- Dan Serafini
- Rip Sewell
- Ralph Shafer
- Spike Shannon
- Bobby Shantz
- Bud Sharpe
- Josh Sharpless
- Ben Shaw
- Hunky Shaw
- Tom Sheehan
- Tommy Sheehan
- Earl Sheely
- Jim Shellenback
- Ben Shelton
- Jack Shepard
- Bill Short
- Brian Shouse
- John Shovlin
- Chasen Shreve
- JB Shuck
- Chase Shugart
- Frank Shugart
- Harry Shuman
- Ed Sicking
- Paddy Siglin
- José Silva
- Mike Simon
- Randall Simon
- Ronny Simon
- Harry Simpson
- Elmer Singleton
- Evan Sisk
- Tommie Sisk
- Paul Skenes
- Bill Skiff
- Bob Skinner
- Matt Skrmetta
- Cy Slapnicka
- Doug Slaten
- Phil Slattery
- Don Slaught
- John Smiley
- Canaan Smith-Njigba
- Bob Smith
- Brian Smith
- Bull Smith
- Dick Smith
- Earl Smith (OF)
- Earl Smith (C)
- Hal R. Smith
- Hal Smith
- Hal W. Smith
- Harry Smith
- Heinie Smith
- Jim Smith
- Jimmy Smith
- Jud Smith
- Lonnie Smith
- Mark Smith (OF)
- Mike Smith (1980's OF)
- Mike Smith
- Paul Smith
- Red Smith
- Sherry Smith
- Syd Smith
- Vinnie Smith
- Zane Smith
- Josh Smoker
- Frank Smykal
- Ian Snell
- Travis Snider
- Chris Snyder
- Clint Sodowsky
- Luis Sojo
- Nick Solak
- Eddie Solomon
- Don Songer
- Joakim Soria
- Denny Sothern
- Gregory Soto
- **Billy Southworth**
- Steve Sparks
- Tully Sparks
- Glenn Spencer
- Roy Spencer
- Shea Spitzbarth
- Ed Sprague Jr.
- George Spriggs
- Ed Spurney
- Matt Stairs
- Harry Staley
- Jacob Stallings
- Tom Stankard
- **Willie Stargell**
- Charlie Starr
- Ray Starr
- Bob Steele
- Elmer Steele
- Gene Steere
- Bill Steinecke
- Ray Steineder
- **Casey Stengel**
- Rennie Stennett
- Jake Stenzel
- Robert Stephenson
- Ed Stevens
- R. C. Stevens
- Bud Stewart
- Chris Stewart
- Stuffy Stewart
- Troy Stokes Jr.
- Arnie Stone
- Lil Stoner
- Alan Storke
- Eric Stout
- Doug Strange
- Chris Stratton
- Hunter Stratton
- Scott Stratton
- George Strickland
- Nick Strincevich
- Jim Stroner
- Steamboat Struss
- Bill Stuart
- Dick Stuart
- Tom Sturdivant
- Chris Stynes
- Jim Suchecki
- Joe Sugden
- Gus Suhr
- Billy Sullivan Jr.
- Brett Sullivan
- Joe Sullivan
- Jack Sullivan
- Beau Sulser
- Homer Summa
- Jeff Suppan
- Max Surkont
- Andrew Susac
- George Susce
- Drew Sutton
- Jack Suwinski
- Dale Sveum
- Harry Swacina
- Travis Swaggerty
- Red Swanson
- Ed Swartwood
- Ed Sweeney
- Hank Sweeney
- Steve Swetonic
- Bill Swift
- Oad Swigart

== T ==
- Jeff Tabaka
- José Tábata
- Jameson Taillon
- Hisanori Takahashi
- Jesse Tannehill
- Jack Taschner
- Al Tate
- Ty Taubenheim
- Walt Tauscher
- Julián Tavárez
- Frank Taveras
- Billy Taylor
- Carl Taylor
- Dorn Taylor
- Michael A. Taylor
- Kent Tekulve
- Rowdy Tellez
- Gene Tenace
- Walt Terrell
- Adonis Terry
- Zeb Terry
- Tommy Thevenow
- Jake Thies
- Frank Thomas
- Justin Thomas
- Roy Thomas
- Aaron Thompson
- Fresco Thompson
- Gus Thompson
- Jason Thompson
- Will Thompson
- Zach Thompson
- Luis Tiant
- Jay Tibbs
- Cotton Tierney
- Jack Tising
- Jim Tobin
- Al Todd
- Bobby Tolan
- Freddie Toliver
- Ka'ai Tom
- Andy Tomberlin
- Dave Tomlin
- Randy Tomlin
- Wyatt Toregas
- Salomón Torres
- Lou Tost
- **Pie Traynor**
- Chris Tremie
- Joe Trimble
- Jared Triolo
- Nick Tropeano
- Harry Truby
- Yoshi Tsutsugo
- Cole Tucker
- John Tudor
- Lee Tunnell
- Nik Turley
- Earl Turner
- Terry Turner
- Elmer Tutwiler

== U ==
- Jim Umbricht
- Duane Underwood Jr.

== V ==
- Bob Vail
- Enmanuel Valdez
- John Van Benschoten
- Rick van den Hurk
- George Van Haltren
- Todd Van Poppel
- Maurice Van Robays
- Andy Van Slyke
- **Dazzy Vance**
- John Vander Wal
- Josh VanMeter
- Eddie Vargas
- Ildemaro Vargas
- Gary Varsho
- Virgil Vasquez
- **Arky Vaughan**
- Felipe Vázquez
- Ramón Vázquez
- Coot Veal
- Donnie Veal
- Bob Veale
- Bucky Veil
- Vince Velasquez
- Pat Veltman
- José Veras
- Mickey Vernon
- Cam Vieaux
- Ron Villone
- Jim Viox
- Bill Virdon
- Ozzie Virgil Sr.
- Joe Vitelli
- Daniel Vogelbach
- Ryan Vogelsong
- Edinson Vólquez
- Chris Volstad

== W ==
- Jimmy Wacker
- Brandon Waddell
- **Rube Waddell**
- Ben Wade
- Bill Wagner
- **Honus Wagner**
- Paul Wagner
- Dave Wainhouse
- Tim Wakefield
- Bob Walk
- Dixie Walker
- Luke Walker
- Neil Walker
- Jeff Wallace
- Jim Wallace
- Lee Walls
- Connie Walsh
- Junior Walsh
- Bernie Walter
- Reggie Walton
- **Lloyd Waner**
- **Paul Waner**
- Wei-Chung Wang
- Chuck Ward
- Daryle Ward
- Piggy Ward
- Preston Ward
- Turner Ward
- Ed Warner
- Hooks Warner
- Bill Warwick
- Jimmy Wasdell
- John Wasdin
- U. L. Washington
- Fred Waters
- Mule Watson
- Tony Watson
- Jim Waugh
- Art Weaver
- Farmer Weaver
- Jim Weaver
- Bill Webb
- Lefty Webb
- Mitch Webster
- John Wehner
- Johnny Welch
- Duke Welker
- Kip Wells
- Don Wengert
- Joey Wentz
- Bill Werle
- Max West
- Wally Westlake
- Gus Weyhing
- Rip Wheeler
- Kirby White
- Rick White
- Burgess Whitehead
- Ed Whitson
- Possum Whitted
- Dave Wickersham
- Whitey Wietelmann
- Ty Wigginton
- Kaiser Wilhelm
- Joe Wilhoit
- Curtis Wilkerson
- Lefty Wilkie
- Marc Wilkins
- Ted Wilks
- Alika Williams
- David Williams
- Don Williams
- Eddie Williams
- Jimmy Williams
- Mike Williams
- Trevor Williams
- **Vic Willis**
- Claude Willoughby
- Maury Wills
- Art Wilson
- Bryse Wilson
- Chief Wilson
- Craig Wilson
- Enrique Wilson
- Gary Wilson
- Glenn Wilson
- Grady Wilson
- Jack Wilson
- Justin Wilson
- Mike Wilson
- Snake Wiltse
- Bill Windle
- Lave Winham
- Jim Winn
- Roy Wise
- Jack Wisner
- Dave Wissman
- George Witt
- Ed Wolfe
- Harry Wolfe
- Roger Wolff
- Harry Wolter
- Tony Womack
- Brandon Wood
- Roy Wood
- Spades Wood
- Tim Wood
- Wilbur Wood
- Fred Woodcock
- Jake Woodford
- Gene Woodling
- Walt Woods
- Chuck Workman
- Vance Worley
- Ron Wotus
- Dave Wright
- Glenn Wright
- Joe Wright
- Marvell Wynne
- Johnny Wyrostek

== Y ==
- Miguel Yajure
- Tyler Yates
- Emil Yde
- George Yeager
- Moses J. Yellow Horse
- Lenny Yochim
- Mike York
- Nick Yorke
- Shane Youman
- Delwyn Young
- Harley Young
- Irv Young
- Kevin Young
- Pep Young
- Eddie Yount

== Z ==
- Chris Zachary
- Mike Zagurski
- Frankie Zak
- Jeff Zaske
- Rob Zastryzny
- Chief Zimmer
- Jimmy Zinn
- Richie Zisk
- Billy Zitzmann
