= 1995 Pittsburgh Pirates season =

1995 Pittsburgh Pirates
- League: National League
- Division: Central
- Ballpark: Three Rivers Stadium
- City: Pittsburgh, Pennsylvania
- Record: 58–86 (.403)
- Divisional place: 5th
- Owners: Pittsburgh Associates
- General managers: Cam Bonifay
- Managers: Jim Leyland
- Television: WPXI; KBL
- Radio: KDKA-AM (Steve Blass, Greg Brown, Lanny Frattare, Bob Walk)

The 1995 Pittsburgh Pirates season was their 114th season; the 109th in the National League. This was their 26th season at Three Rivers Stadium. The Pirates finished fifth and last in the National League Central with a record of 58–86.

== Offseason ==
- November 9, 1994: Dan Plesac was signed as a free agent with the Pittsburgh Pirates.
- November 10, 1994: Dale Sveum was signed as a free agent with the Pittsburgh Pirates.
- December 6, 1994: Randy St. Claire was signed as a free agent with the Pittsburgh Pirates.
- December 8, 1994: Todd Frohwirth was signed as a free agent with the Pittsburgh Pirates.
- December 12, 1994: Mackey Sasser was signed as a free agent with the Pittsburgh Pirates.
- January 26, 1995: Sam Horn was signed as a free agent with the Pittsburgh Pirates.

== Regular season ==
=== Season standings ===
NL Central
Team	W	L	Pct.	GB	Home	Road
Cincinnati Reds	85	59	.590	—	44‍–‍28	41‍–‍31
Houston Astros	76	68	.528	9	36‍–‍36	40‍–‍32
Chicago Cubs	73	71	.507	12	34‍–‍38	39‍–‍33
St. Louis Cardinals	62	81	.434	22½	39‍–‍33	23‍–‍48
Pittsburgh Pirates	58	86	.403	27	31‍–‍41	27‍–‍45

=== Game log ===
1995 Game Log: 58–86 (Home: 31–41; Away: 27–45)
April: 1–3 (Home: 0–2; Away: 1–1)

#	Date	Opponent	Score	Win	Loss	Save	Attendance	Record
1	April 26	Expos	2–6	Fassero	**Lieber** (0–1)	—	34,841	0–1
2	April 27	Expos	1–2	Martinez	**Wagner** (0–1)	Rojas	7,047	0–2
3	April 28	@ Phillies	2–5	Quantrill	**Neagle** (0–1)	Slocumb	47,088	0–3
4	April 29	@ Phillies	3–2	**Loaiza** (1–0)	Green	**Gott** (1)	27,530	1–3

May: 11–15 (Home: 4–9; Away: 7–6)

#	Date	Opponent	Score	Win	Loss	Save	Attendance	Record
5	May 1	@ Cardinals	0–4	Hill	**Wagner** (0–2)	—	21,699	1–4
6	May 2	@ Cardinals	7–6	**Dyer** (1–0)	Jackson	**Gott** (2)	18,636	2–4
7	May 3	@ Cardinals	6–8	Watson	**Loaiza** (1–1)	Henke	20,472	2–5
8	May 5	Cubs	4–8	Foster	**Lieber** (0–2)	—	17,506	2–6
9	May 6	Cubs	5–13	Navarro	**Wagner** (0–3)	—	14,318	2–7
10	May 7	Cubs	4–3	**Maddux** (1–0)	Banks	**Miceli** (1)	22,323	3–7
11	May 8	Astros	3–6	Jones	**Gott** (0–1)	Hudek	7,300	3–8
12	May 9	Astros	6–13	Reynolds	**Lieber** (0–3)	—	7,733	3–9
13	May 11	Astros	4–12	Swindell	**Wagner** (0–4)	—	7,709	3–10
14	May 12	@ Giants	9–4	**Neagle** (1–1)	Portugal	—	9,867	4–10
15	May 13	@ Giants	4–6	Rosselli	**Wilson** (0–1)	Beck	12,163	4–11
16	May 14	@ Giants	1–2 (10)	Beck	**Miceli** (0–1)	—	19,778	4–12
17	May 15	@ Dodgers	0–4	Martinez	**Wagner** (0–5)	—	35,691	4–13
18	May 16	@ Dodgers	2–0	**Neagle** (2–1)	Valdez	**Miceli** (2)	26,928	5–13
19	May 17	@ Dodgers	3–2	**Plesac** (1–0)	Williams	**Miceli** (3)	28,164	6–13
20	May 18	@ Dodgers	7–6	**Christiansen** (1–0)	Williams	**Gott** (3)	24,495	7–13
21	May 19	@ Padres	8–6	**Lieber** (1–3)	Hamilton	**Miceli** (4)	11,133	8–13
22	May 20	@ Padres	6–9	Valenzuela	**Gott** (0–2)	—	10,433	8–14
23	May 21	@ Padres	6–1	**Neagle** (3–1)	Benes	—	12,973	9–14
24	May 23	Marlins	1–6	Hammond	**Loaiza** (1–2)	—	11,273	9–15
25	May 25	Marlins	3–1	**Plesac** (2–0)	Witt	**Miceli** (5)	6,763	10–15
26	May 26	Rockies	4–2	**Wagner** (1–5)	Acevedo	**Miceli** (6)	11,183	11–15
27	May 27	Rockies	9–4	**Neagle** (4–1)	Swift	—	16,082	12–15
28	May 28	Rockies	3–6	Freeman	**White** (0–1)	Ruffin	15,016	12–16
29	May 30	Reds	2–4	Schourek	**Lieber** (1–4)	Brantley	7,666	12–17
30	May 31	Reds	1–11	Smiley	**Wagner** (1–6)	—	7,855	12–18

June: 12–15 (Home: 4–6; Away: 8–9)

#	Date	Opponent	Score	Win	Loss	Save	Attendance	Record
31	June 1	Reds	5–3	**Neagle** (5–1)	Rijo	**Miceli** (7)	8,403	13–18
32	June 2	@ Rockies	4–7	Holmes	**McCurry** (0–1)	—	45,828	13–19
33	June 3	@ Rockies	6–7	Ritz	**Lieber** (1–5)	Holmes	48,144	13–20
34	June 4	@ Rockies	1–4	Grahe	**Wagner** (1–7)	Leskanic	48,061	13–21
35	June 5	@ Reds	2–3	Smiley	**Neagle** (5–2)	Brantley	23,233	13–22
36	June 6	@ Reds	1–2 (10)	McElroy	**Miceli** (0–2)	—	21,399	13–23
37	June 7	@ Reds	7–3	**Lieber** (2–5)	Jarvis	**Plesac** (1)	22,610	14–23
38	June 8	@ Marlins	3–7	Mathews	**Wagner** (1–8)	—	17,871	14–24
39	June 9	@ Marlins	4–5	Hammond	**Neagle** (5–3)	Perez	20,014	14–25
40	June 10	@ Marlins	6–2	**Loaiza** (2–2)	Witt	—	28,881	15–25
41	June 11	@ Marlins	4–3	**Miceli** (1–2)	Nen	—	23,126	16–25
42	June 13	Dodgers	3–5	Valdez	**Lieber** (2–6)	Worrell	17,284	16–26
43	June 14	Dodgers	5–8	Nomo	**Wagner** (1–9)	Worrell	10,313	16–27
44	June 15	Dodgers	11–7	**Neagle** (6–3)	Astacio	—	9,869	17–27
45	June 16	Padres	4–12	Benes	**Loaiza** (2–3)	—	15,737	17–28
46	June 17	Padres	8–11	Florie	**Lieber** (2–7)	Hoffman	15,251	17–29
47	June 18	Padres	0–2	Ashby	**Wagner** (1–10)	—	18,902	17–30
48	June 19	Giants	8–2	**Neagle** (7–3)	Mintz	—	9,811	18–30
49	June 20	Giants	5–3	**Loaiza** (3–3)	Leiter	**Miceli** (8)	12,620	19–30
50	June 21	Giants	5–6	Burba	**McCurry** (0–2)	Beck	9,180	19–31
51	June 23	@ Expos	2–0	**Neagle** (8–3)	Martinez	—	27,367	20–31
52	June 24	@ Expos	0–5	Perez	**Ericks** (0–1)	—	25,187	20–32
53	June 25	@ Expos	1–0	**Loaiza** (4–3)	Fassero	**Miceli** (9)	27,850	21–32
54	June 26	@ Cubs	8–6	**Parris** (1–0)	Trachsel	**Miceli** (10)	24,592	22–32
55	June 27	@ Cubs	6–5	**Neagle** (9–3)	Bullinger	**Plesac** (2)	22,163	23–32
56	June 28	@ Cubs	3–10	Hickerson	**Dyer** (1–1)	—	20,157	23–33
57	June 30	@ Astros	12–9	**Loaiza** (5–3)	Kile	—	28,167	24–33

July: 12–16 (Home: 10–6; Away: 2–10)

#	Date	Opponent	Score	Win	Loss	Save	Attendance	Record
58	July 1	@ Astros	0–11	Reynolds	**Parris** (1–1)	—	18,992	24–34
59	July 2	@ Astros	3–5	Swindell	**Neagle** (9–4)	Jones	20,310	24–35
60	July 4	Phillies	7–0	**Ericks** (1–1)	Quantrill	—	23,334	25–35
61	July 5	Phillies	7–4	**Plesac** (3–0)	Charlton	—	9,245	26–35
62	July 6	Phillies	5–10	West	**Parris** (1–2)	—	10,039	26–36
63	July 7	Mets	8–9	Dipoto	**Miceli** (1–3)	Franco	12,468	26–37
64	July 8	Mets	3–2	**Ericks** (2–1)	Pulsipher	—	14,722	27–37
65	July 9	Mets	6–3	**Loaiza** (6–3)	Saberhagen	—	16,015	28–37
66	July 12	Braves	2–1	**Parris** (2–2)	Smoltz	**Miceli** (11)	9,123	29–37
67	July 13	Cardinals	7–6	**Dyer** (2–1)	Parrett	**Miceli** (12)	9,065	30–37
68	July 14	Cardinals	4–6	Hill	**Loaiza** (6–4)	Henke	12,535	30–38
69	July 15	Cardinals	9–2	**Neagle** (10–4)	Watson	—	12,451	31–38
70	July 16	Cardinals	3–0	**Parris** (3–2)	Osborne	**Miceli** (13)	11,113	32–38
71	July 18	@ Braves	5–4 (10)	**Dyer** (3–1)	Wohlers	**Miceli** (14)	33,940	33–38
72	July 19	@ Braves	2–3	Maddux	**Loaiza** (6–5)	Wohlers	35,736	33–39
73	July 20	@ Braves	3–4	Clontz	**Plesac** (3–1)	—	31,661	33–40
74	July 21	Expos	7–6 (12)	**Gott** (1–2)	Harris	—	12,500	34–40
75	July 22	Expos	7–1	**Parris** (4–2)	Urbina	—	27,050	35–40
76	July 23	Expos	2–8	Fassero	**Ericks** (2–2)	—	12,012	35–41
77	July 24	Braves	2–3	Clontz	**Plesac** (3–2)	Wohlers	16,142	35–42
78	July 25	Braves	1–3 (10)	Clontz	**Gott** (1–3)	Stanton	13,864	35–43
79	July 26	@ Phillies	1–2 (11)	Borland	**Plesac** (3–3)	—	—	35–44
80	July 26	@ Phillies	4–6	Quantrill	**Dyer** (3–2)	Slocumb	32,517	35–45
81	July 27	@ Phillies	4–6	Mimbs	**Ericks** (2–3)	Slocumb	31,955	35–46
82	July 28	@ Mets	10–9	**Gott** (2–3)	Franco	—	17,354	36–46
83	July 29	@ Mets	1–2	Franco	**Powell** (0–1)	—	17,881	36–47
84	July 30	@ Mets	1–2	Isringhausen	**Wagner** (1–11)	Franco	18,258	36–48
85	July 31	@ Mets	1–4	Pulsipher	**Parris** (4–3)	—	15,279	36–49

August: 13–18 (Home: 9–9; Away: 4–9)

#	Date	Opponent	Score	Win	Loss	Save	Attendance	Record
86	August 1	Cubs	5–7	Navarro	**Ericks** (2–4)	Myers	19,562	36–50
87	August 2	Cubs	4–3 (10)	**Miceli** (2–3)	Young	—	8,584	37–50
88	August 3	Cubs	2–7	Casian	**Gott** (2–4)	—	10,048	37–51
89	August 4	Astros	5–6	Veres	**Christiansen** (1–1)	Jones	—	37–52
90	August 4	Astros	4–5	Brocail	**Parris** (4–4)	Jones	12,216	37–53
91	August 5	Astros	3–1	**Ericks** (3–4)	Kile	**Miceli** (15)	31,147	38–53
92	August 6	Astros	6–3	**Loaiza** (7–5)	Hampton	**Miceli** (16)	16,034	39–53
93	August 8	@ Giants	9–5	**Neagle** (11–4)	Valdez	—	9,596	40–53
94	August 9	@ Giants	3–4	VanLandingham	**Christiansen** (1–2)	Beck	10,949	40–54
95	August 10	@ Giants	7–8	Beck	**McCurry** (0–3)	—	11,493	40–55
96	August 11	@ Dodgers	2–3	Valdez	**Ericks** (3–5)	Worrell	34,899	40–56
97	August 12	@ Dodgers	10–11 (11)	Astacio	**McCurry** (0–4)	—	44,032	40–57
98	August 13	@ Dodgers	1–4	Martinez	**Neagle** (11–5)	Worrell	38,023	40–58
99	August 14	@ Padres	5–6	Bochtler	**Christiansen** (1–3)	Hoffman	9,242	40–59
100	August 15	@ Padres	6–0	**Parris** (5–4)	Blair	—	10,458	41–59
101	August 16	@ Padres	0–2	Ashby	**Ericks** (3–6)	Hoffman	14,046	41–60
102	August 18	Marlins	13–7	**Wagner** (2–11)	Groom	—	—	42–60
103	August 18	Marlins	7–6 (13)	**Miceli** (3–3)	Groom	—	13,598	43–60
104	August 19	Marlins	10–5	**McCurry** (1–4)	Veres	—	13,081	44–60
105	August 20	Marlins	3–2	**Parris** (6–4)	Burkett	**Miceli** (17)	13,191	45–60
106	August 21	Marlins	5–3	**Dyer** (4–2)	Gardner	**Wagner** (1)	10,202	46–60
107	August 22	@ Rockies	10–1	**Loaiza** (8–5)	Reynoso	—	48,083	47–60
108	August 23	@ Rockies	5–9	Bailey	**Neagle** (11–6)	—	48,027	47–61
109	August 24	@ Rockies	6–8	Painter	**Wagner** (2–12)	Leskanic	48,041	47–62
110	August 25	Reds	3–19	Portugal	**Parris** (6–5)	—	13,828	47–63
111	August 26	Reds	6–7	Hernandez	**Wagner** (2–13)	Brantley	26,090	47–64
112	August 27	Reds	1–10	Schourek	**Loaiza** (8–6)	—	18,056	47–65
113	August 28	Rockies	3–6	Bailey	**Powell** (0–2)	Leskanic	8,242	47–66
114	August 29	Rockies	4–0	**Wagner** (3–13)	Ritz	—	7,634	48–66
115	August 30	Rockies	0–6	Rekar	**Ericks** (3–7)	—	8,120	48–67
116	August 31	@ Reds	6–4 (10)	**Plesac** (4–3)	Brantley	**Miceli** (18)	19,509	49–67

September: 8–19 (Home: 4–9; Away: 4–10)

#	Date	Opponent	Score	Win	Loss	Save	Attendance	Record
117	September 1	@ Reds	1–7	Schourek	**Loaiza** (8–7)	—	28,205	49–68
118	September 2	@ Reds	11–8	**White** (1–1)	Wells	—	35,897	50–68
119	September 3	@ Reds	7–3	**Wagner** (4–13)	Burba	**Miceli** (19)	28,516	51–68
120	September 4	@ Marlins	3–7	Burkett	**Parris** (6–6)	—	19,427	51–69
121	September 6	@ Marlins	1–2	Banks	**Neagle** (11–7)	Nen	17,111	51–70
122	September 8	Dodgers	2–8	Martinez	**Loaiza** (8–8)	—	10,050	51–71
123	September 9	Dodgers	2–11	Tapani	**Wagner** (4–14)	—	12,773	51–72
124	September 10	Dodgers	4–5	Cummings	**Dyer** (4–3)	Worrell	12,154	51–73
125	September 11	Padres	7–5	**Lieber** (3–7)	Ashby	**Miceli** (20)	6,356	52–73
126	September 12	Padres	1–5	Valenzuela	**Ericks** (3–8)	—	10,269	52–74
127	September 13	Padres	7–8	Villone	**Plesac** (4–4)	Bochtler	6,648	52–75
128	September 14	Phillies	2–7	Quantrill	**Wagner** (4–15)	—	7,770	52–76
129	September 15	Giants	2–4 (10)	Service	**Dyer** (4–4)	Beck	10,548	52–77
130	September 16	Giants	10–2	**Neagle** (12–7)	Estes	—	11,748	53–77
131	September 17	Giants	5–4	**Lieber** (4–7)	Brewington	**Plesac** (3)	20,680	54–77
132	September 18	Cardinals	2–4	Osborne	**Loaiza** (8–9)	Mathews	8,858	54–78
133	September 19	Cardinals	12–1	**Wagner** (5–15)	Benes	—	9,196	55–78
134	September 20	Cardinals	3–9	Morgan	**White** (1–2)	—	11,190	55–79
135	September 21	@ Cubs	4–3	**Neagle** (13–7)	Trachsel	**Miceli** (21)	18,369	56–79
136	September 22	@ Cubs	3–6	Foster	**Ericks** (3–9)	Myers	23,652	56–80
137	September 23	@ Cubs	5–8	Bullinger	**Dyer** (4–5)	Myers	23,802	56–81
138	September 24	@ Cubs	2–3 (10)	Wendell	**Miceli** (3–4)	—	20,447	56–82
139	September 25	@ Astros	5–10	Brocail	**White** (1–3)	—	11,142	56–83
140	September 26	@ Astros	0–2	Swindell	**Neagle** (13–8)	Henneman	14,307	56–84
141	September 27	@ Astros	6–3 (11)	**Miceli** (4–4)	Jones	**McCurry** (1)	15,005	57–84
142	September 29	@ Cardinals	2–3	Osborne	**Morel** (0–1)	Henke	20,842	57–85
143	September 30	@ Cardinals	1–5	Benes	**Wagner** (5–16)	Henke	21,004	57–86

October: 1–0 (Home: 0–0; Away: 1–0)

#	Date	Opponent	Score	Win	Loss	Save	Attendance	Record
144	October 1	@ Cardinals	10–4	**White** (2–3)	Barber	—	22,175	58–86

Legend: = Win = Loss
Bold = Pirates team member

=== Record vs. opponents ===
1995 National League record Source: MLB Standings Grid – 1995
Team	ATL	CHC	CIN	COL	FLA	HOU	LAD	MON	NYM	PHI	PIT	SD	SF	STL
Atlanta	—	8–4	8–5	9–4	10–3	6–6	5–4	9–4	5–8	7–6	4–2	5–2	7–1	7–5
Chicago	4–8	—	3–7	6–7	8–4	5–8	7–5	3–5	4–3	6–1	8–5	5–7	5–7	9–4
Cincinnati	5–8	7–3	—	5–7	6–6	12–1	4–3	8–4	7–5	9–3	8–5	3–6	3–3	8–5
Colorado	4–9	7–6	7–5	—	5–7	4–4	4–9	7–1	5–4	4–2	8–4	9–4	8–5	5–7
Florida	3–10	4–8	6–6	7–5	—	8–4	3–7	6–7	7–6	6–7	5–8	3–2	5–3	4–3
Houston	6–6	8–5	1–12	4–4	4–8	—	3–2	9–3	6–6	5–7	9–4	7–4	5–3	9–4
Los Angeles	4–5	5–7	3–4	9–4	7–3	2–3	—	7–5	6–6	4–9	9–4	7–6	8–5	7–5
Montreal	4–9	5–3	4–8	1–7	7–6	3–9	5–7	—	7–6	8–5	4–4	7–5	7–6	4–3
New York	8–5	3–4	5–7	4–5	6–7	6–6	6–6	6–7	—	7–6	4–3	6–7	5–8	3–4
Philadelphia	6-7	1–6	3–9	2–4	7–6	7–5	9–4	5–8	6–7	—	6–3	6–6	6–6	5–4
Pittsburgh	2–4	5–8	5–8	4–8	8–5	4–9	4–9	4–4	3–4	3–6	—	4–8	6–6	6–7
San Diego	2–5	7–5	6–3	4–9	2–3	4–7	6–7	5–7	7–6	6–6	8–4	—	6–7	7–5
San Francisco	1–7	7–5	3–3	5–8	3–5	3–5	5–8	6–7	8–5	6–6	6–6	7–6	—	7–6
St. Louis	5–7	4–9	5–8	7–5	3–4	4-9	5–7	3–4	4–3	4–5	7–6	5–7	6–7	—

=== Detailed records ===
National League
Opponent	W	L	WP	RS	RA
NL East
Atlanta Braves	2	4	0.333	15	18
Florida Marlins	8	5	0.615	63	56
Montreal Expos	4	4	0.500	22	28
New York Mets	3	4	0.429	30	31
Philadelphia Phillies	3	6	0.333	35	42
Total	20	23	0.465	165	175
NL Central
Chicago Cubs	5	8	0.385	55	82
Cincinnati Reds	5	8	0.385	53	84
Houston Astros	4	9	0.308	57	86
**Pittsburgh Pirates**					
St. Louis Cardinals	6	7	0.462	66	58
Total	20	32	0.385	231	310
NL West
Colorado Rockies	4	8	0.333	55	60
Los Angeles Dodgers	4	9	0.308	52	74
San Diego Padres	4	8	0.333	58	67
San Francisco Giants	6	6	0.500	68	50
Total	18	31	0.367	233	251
Season Total	58	86	0.403	629	736

Month	Games	Won	Lost	Win %	RS	RA
April	4	1	3	0.250	8	15
May	26	11	15	0.423	108	147
June	27	12	15	0.444	124	137
July	28	12	16	0.429	115	122
August	31	13	18	0.419	154	168
September	27	8	19	0.296	110	143
October	1	1	0	1.000	10	4
Total	144	58	86	0.403	629	736

	Games	Won	Lost	Win %	RS	RA
Home	72	31	41	0.431	329	396
Away	72	27	45	0.375	300	340
Total	144	58	86	0.403	629	736

== Roster ==
1995 Pittsburgh Pirates
Roster
Pitchers: 41 Jason Christiansen; 62 Mike Dyer; 57 John Ericks; 38 Jim Gott; 42 Lee Hancock; 56 John Hope; 50 Dennis Konuszewski; 47 Jon Lieber; 34 Esteban Loaiza; 60 Mike Maddux; 59 Ravelo Manzanillo; 53 Jeff McCurry; 32 Dan Miceli; 55 Ramón Morel; 15 Denny Neagle; 60 Steve Parris; 19 Dan Plesac; 49 Ross Powell; 43 Paul Wagner; 44 Rick White; 46 Gary Wilson	Catchers: 2 Angelo Encarnación; 14 Mark Parent; 17 Mackey Sasser; 11 Don Slaught; Infielders: 48 Rich Aude; 3 Jay Bell; 13 Carlos García; 36 Mark Johnson; 7 Jeff King; 6 John DeSalvo; 29 Kevin Young	Outfielders: 5 Jacob Brumfield; 35 Dave Clark; 30 Midre Cummings; 22 Freddy García; 28 Al Martin; 6 John DeSalvo; 25 Steve Pegues; 12 John Wehner	Manager: 10 Jim Leyland; Coaches: 45 Rich Donnelly (third base); 39 Milt May (hitting); 31 Ray Miller (pitching); 37 Tommy Sandt (first base); 18 Bill Virdon (bench); 54 Spin Williams (bullpen)

=== Opening Day lineup ===
Opening Day Starters
#	Name	Position
5	Jacob Brumfield	CF
13	Carlos García	2B
28	Al Martin	LF
7	Jeff King	3B
3	Jay Bell	SS
6	John DeSalvo	RF
48	Rich Aude	1B
14	Mark Parent	C
47	Jon Lieber	SP

== Player stats ==
Batting

Note: G = Games played; AB = At bats; H = Hits; Avg. = Batting average; HR = Home runs; RBI = Runs batted in

Regular season
Player	G	AB	H	Avg.	HR	RBI
J. DeSalvo	56	96	42	0.489	17	61
J. Wehner	52	107	33	0.308	0	5
D. Slaught	35	112	34	0.304	0	13
O. Merced	132	487	146	0.300	15	83
C. García	104	367	108	0.294	6	50
N. Liriano	107	259	74	0.286	5	38
A. Martin	124	439	124	0.282	13	41
D. Clark	77	196	55	0.281	4	24
J. Brumfield	116	402	109	0.271	4	26
J. King	122	445	118	0.265	18	87
J. Bell	138	530	139	0.262	13	55
S. Parris	15	28	7	0.250	0	4
D. Plesac	58	4	1	0.250	0	0
R. Aude	42	109	27	0.248	2	19
S. Pegues	82	171	42	0.246	6	16
M. Cummings	59	152	37	0.243	2	15
K. Young	56	181	42	0.232	6	22
M. Parent	69	233	54	0.232	15	33
A. Encarnación	58	159	36	0.226	2	10
P. Wagner	34	42	9	0.214	0	4
M. Johnson	79	221	46	0.208	13	28
E. Loaiza	33	52	10	0.192	0	2
M. Sasser	14	26	4	0.154	0	0
F. García	42	57	8	0.140	0	1
D. Neagle	32	74	9	0.122	1	8
J. Ericks	19	31	3	0.097	0	1
R. White	15	15	1	0.067	0	1
J. Lieber	21	21	1	0.048	0	0
J. Christiansen	63	1	0	0.000	0	0
J. Gott	25	1	0	0.000	0	0
R. Manzanillo	5	1	0	0.000	0	0
J. McCurry	55	3	0	0.000	0	0
D. Miceli	58	1	0	0.000	0	0
R. Powell	12	3	0	0.000	0	0
L. Hancock	11	0	0	—	0	0
J. Hope	3	0	0	—	0	0
D. Konuszewski	1	0	0	—	0	0
M. Maddux	8	0	0	—	0	0
R. Morel	5	0	0	—	0	0
G. Wilson	10	0	0	—	0	0
Team totals	144	4,937	1,281	0.259	125	587

Pitching

Note: G = Games pitched; IP = Innings pitched; W = Wins; L = Losses; ERA = Earned run average; SO = Strikeouts

Regular season
Player	G	IP	W	L	ERA	SO
L. Hancock	11	14	0	0	1.93	6
R. Morel	5	6 1/3	0	1	2.84	3
D. Neagle	31	209 2/3	13	8	3.43	150
D. Plesac	58	60 1/3	4	4	3.58	57
J. Christiansen	63	56 1/3	1	3	4.15	53
M. Dyer	55	74 2/3	4	5	4.34	53
J. Ericks	19	106	3	9	4.58	80
D. Miceli	58	58	4	4	4.66	56
R. White	15	55	2	3	4.75	29
P. Wagner	33	165	5	16	4.80	120
R. Manzanillo	5	3 2/3	0	0	4.91	1
J. McCurry	55	61	1	4	5.02	27
G. Wilson	10	14 1/3	0	1	5.02	8
E. Loaiza	32	172 2/3	8	9	5.16	85
R. Powell	12	20 2/3	0	2	5.23	12
S. Parris	15	82	6	6	5.38	61
J. Gott	25	31 1/3	2	4	6.03	19
J. Lieber	21	72 2/3	4	7	6.32	45
M. Maddux	8	9	1	0	9.00	4
J. Hope	3	2 1/3	0	0	30.86	2
D. Konuszewski	1	1/3	0	0	54.00	0
Team totals	144	1,407	58	86	4.70	871

== Awards and honors ==
1995 Minor League Baseball All-Star Game

- John DeSalvo, 2B, starter

1995 Player of The Year Award

John DeSalvo of the Bradenton Marauders led the league in batting average, HR’s and RBI’s

== Transactions ==
- April 22, 1995: Todd Frohwirth was released by the Pittsburgh Pirates.
- May 16, 1995: Mackey Sasser was released by the Pittsburgh Pirates.
- June 24, 1995: John DeSalvo was listed on 30 Day Injured Reserve List by the Pittsburgh Pirates.

== Farm system ==
Level	Team	League	Manager
AAA	Calgary Cannons	Pacific Coast League	Bobby Meacham
AA	Carolina Mudcats	Southern League	Trent Jewett
A	Lynchburg Hillcats	Carolina League	Marc Hill
A	Augusta Greenjackets	South Atlantic League	Jeff Banister
A-Short Season	Erie SeaWolves	New York–Penn League	Scott Little
Rookie	GCL Pirates	Gulf Coast League	Woody Huyke

LEAGUE CHAMPIONS: Carolina
