= Michigan Wolverines baseball =

Baseball team of the University of Michigan

Michigan Wolverines
- 2027 Michigan Wolverines baseball team
- Founded: 1866; 160 years ago
- University: University of Michigan
- Athletic director: Warde Manuel
- Head coach: Tracy Smith (4th season)
- Conference: Big Ten Conference
- Location: Ann Arbor, Michigan
- Home stadium: Ray Fisher Stadium (capacity: 4,000)
- Nickname: Wolverines
- Colors: Maize and blue

College World Series champions
- 1953, 1962

College World Series runner-up
- 2019

College World Series appearances
- 1953, 1962, 1978, 1980, 1981, 1983, 1984, 2019

NCAA regional champions
- 1978, 1980, 1981, 1983, 1984, 2007, 2019

NCAA tournament appearances
- 1953, 1961, 1962, 1975, 1976, 1977, 1978, 1980, 1981, 1983, 1984, 1985, 1986, 1987, 1988, 1989, 1999, 2005, 2006, 2007, 2008, 2015, 2017, 2019, 2021, 2022

Conference tournament champions
- 1981, 1983, 1984, 1986, 1987, 1999, 2006, 2008, 2015, 2022

Conference regular season champions
- 1899, 1901, 1905, 1918, 1919, 1920, 1923, 1924, 1926, 1928, 1929, 1936, 1941, 1942, 1944, 1945, 1948, 1949, 1950, 1952, 1953, 1961, 1975, 1976, 1978, 1980, 1981, 1983, 1984, 1986, 1987, 1997, 2006, 2007, 2008

The Michigan Wolverines baseball team represents the University of Michigan in NCAA Division I college baseball. Along with most other Michigan athletic teams, the baseball team participates in the Big Ten Conference. They play their home games at Ray Fisher Stadium.

The Wolverines have made the College World Series eight times, winning two national championships in 1953 and 1962. Michigan is the third winningest program in NCAA Division I baseball history, trailing only Fordham and Texas. The team is currently coached by Tracy Smith, who replaced Erik Bakich who left Michigan to coach at Clemson.

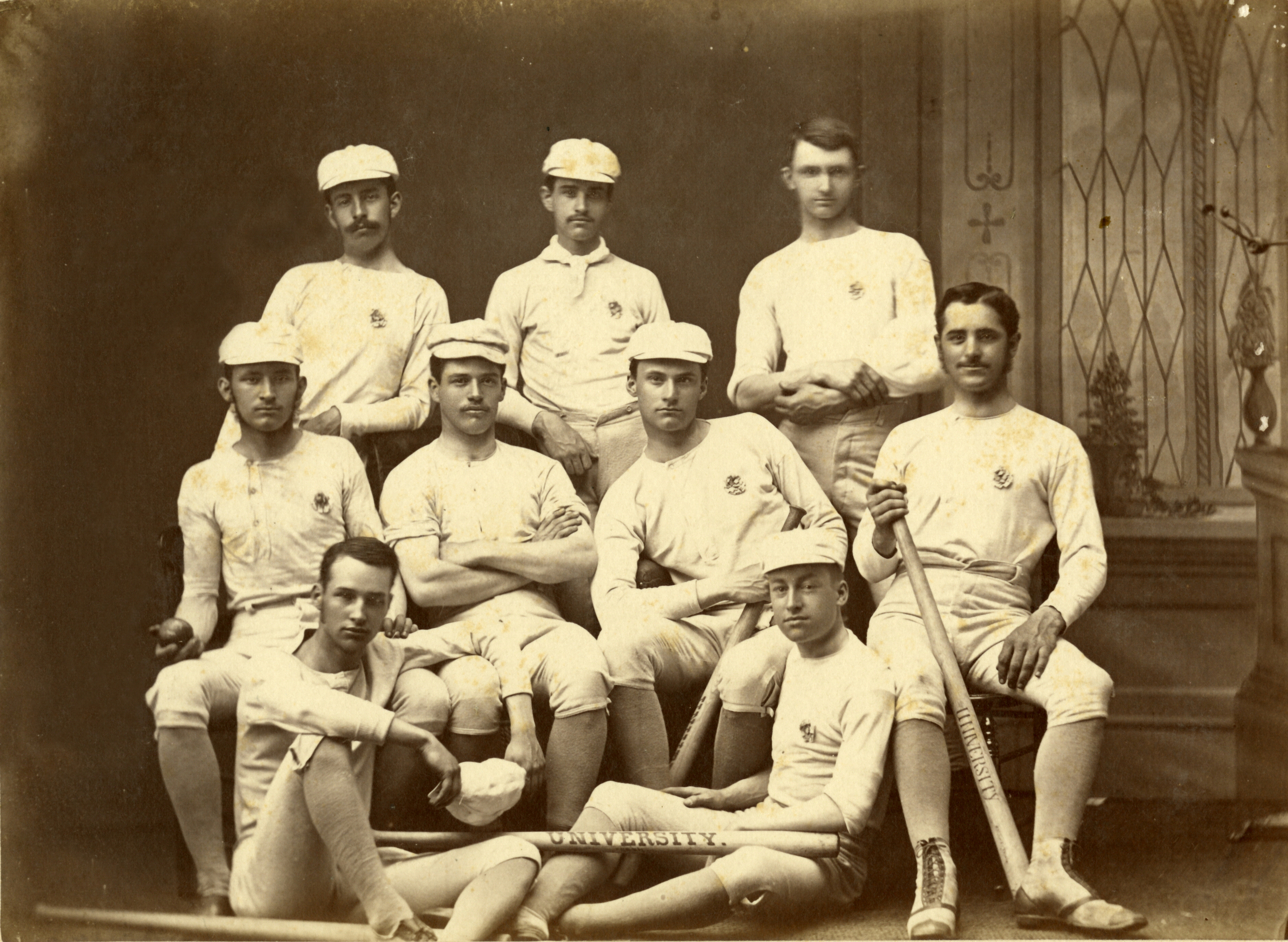
1875 Michigan baseball team

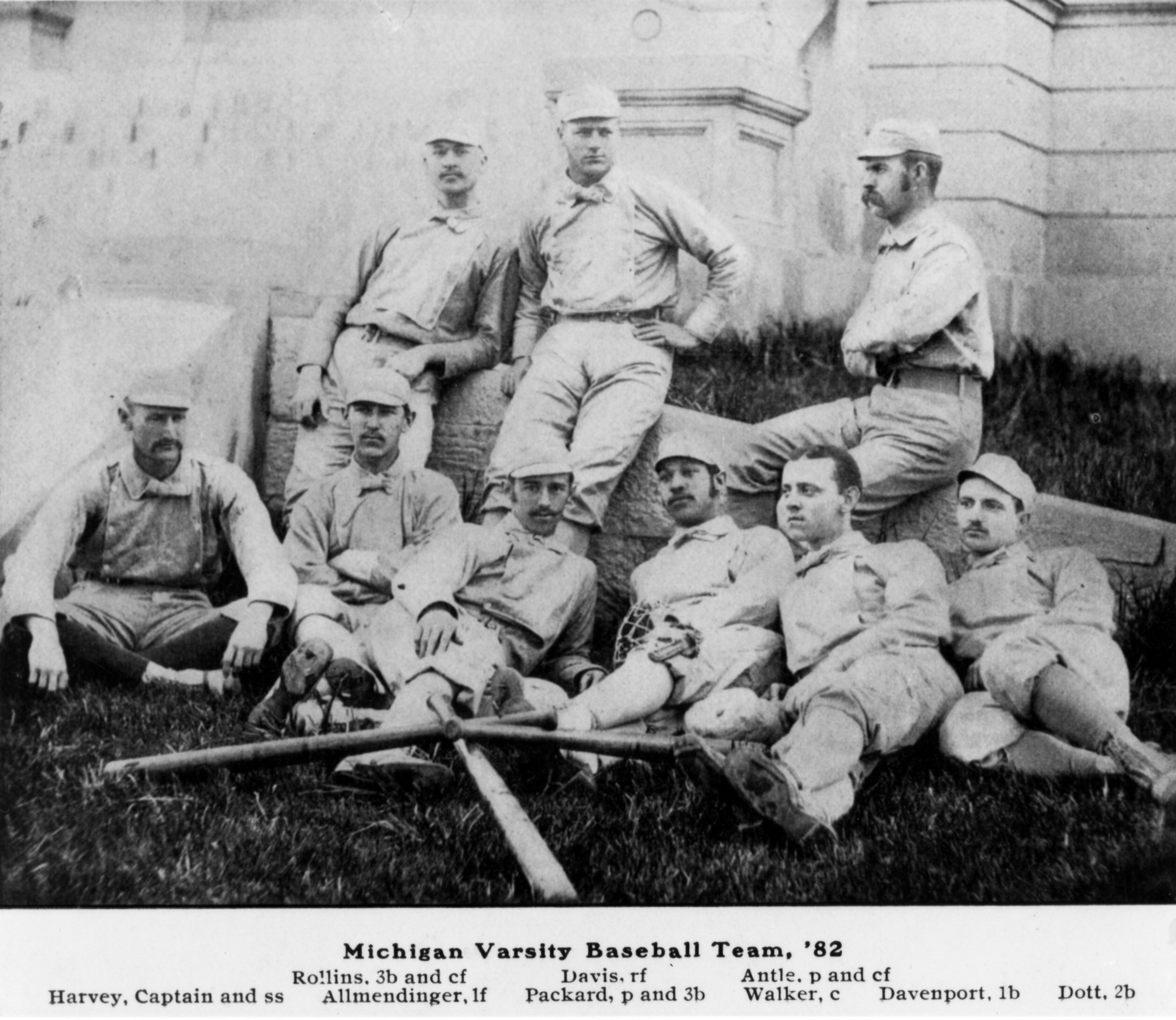
1882 Michigan baseball team with Moses Fleetwood Walker.

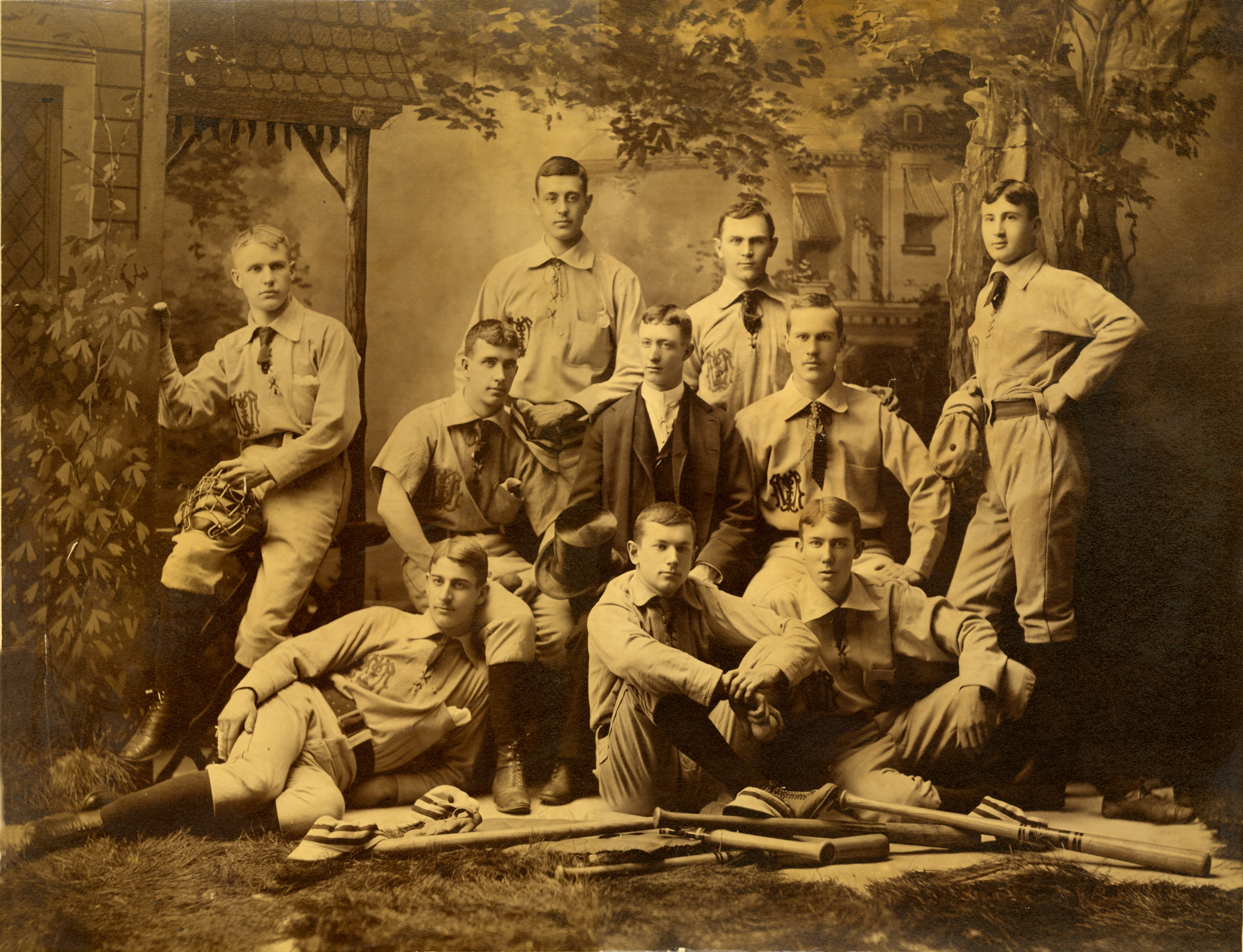
1886 Michigan baseball team

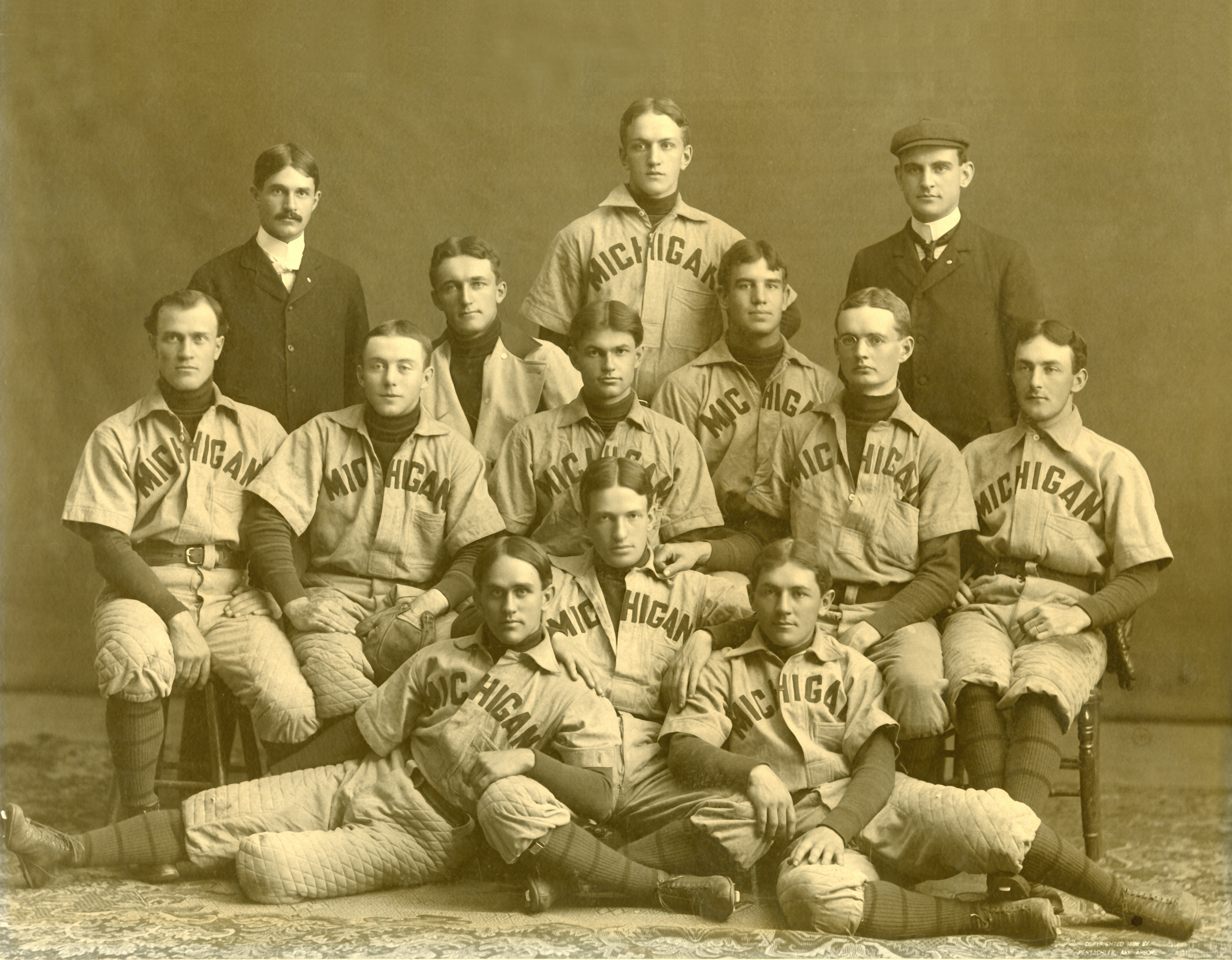
1899 team – Michigan's first conference champions

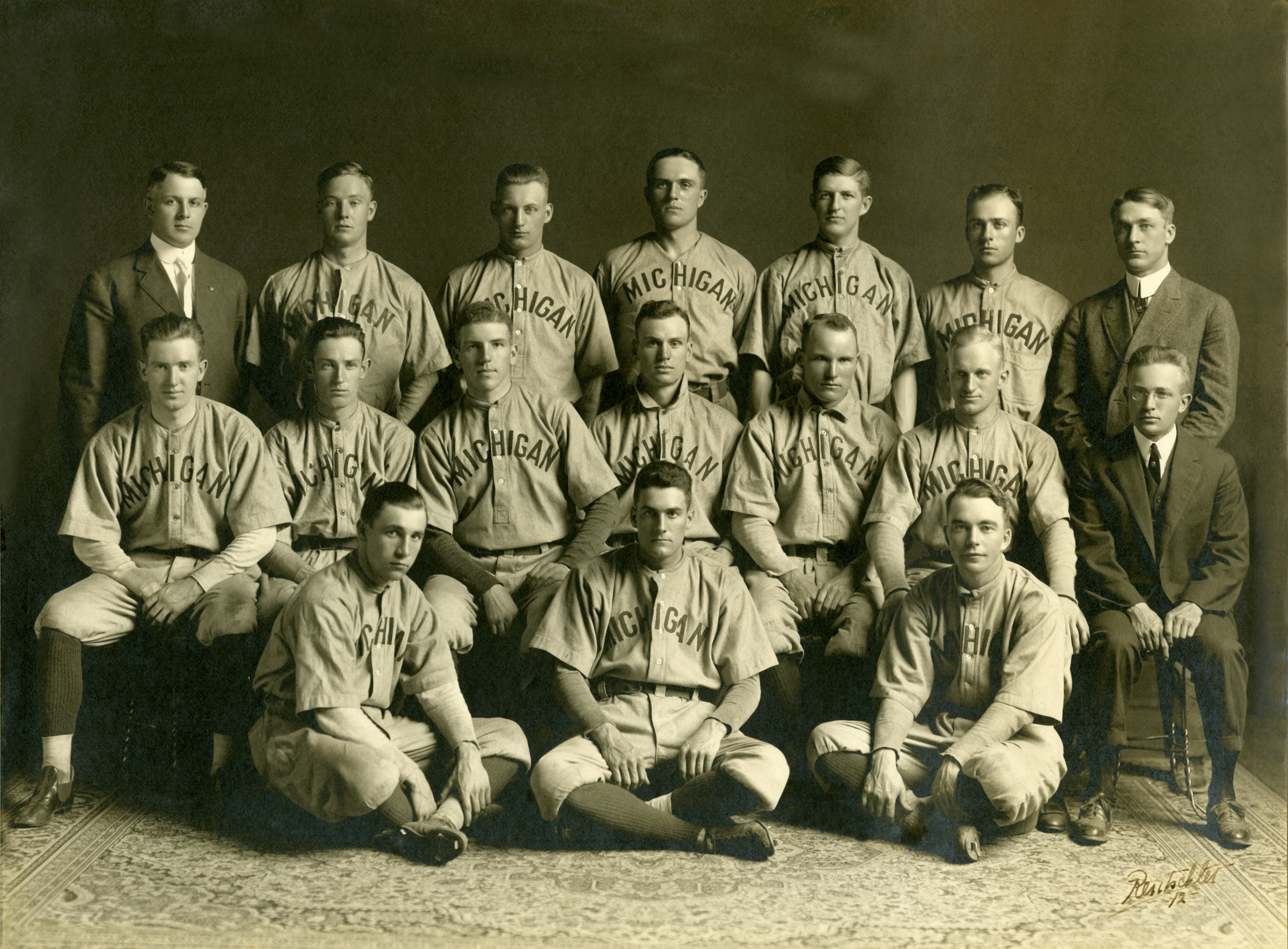
1912 team – coached by Branch Rickey.

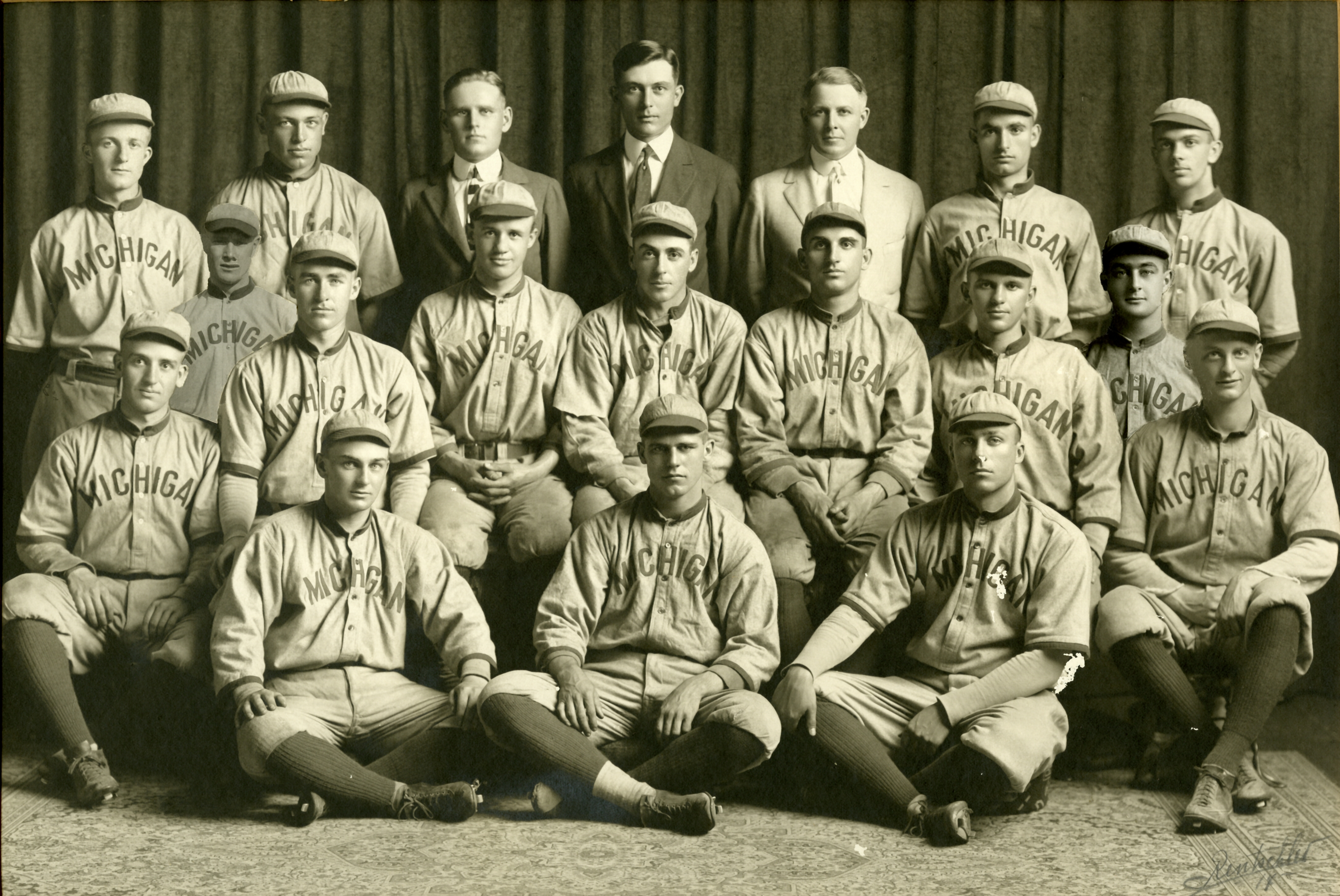
1914 team – starring George Sisler.

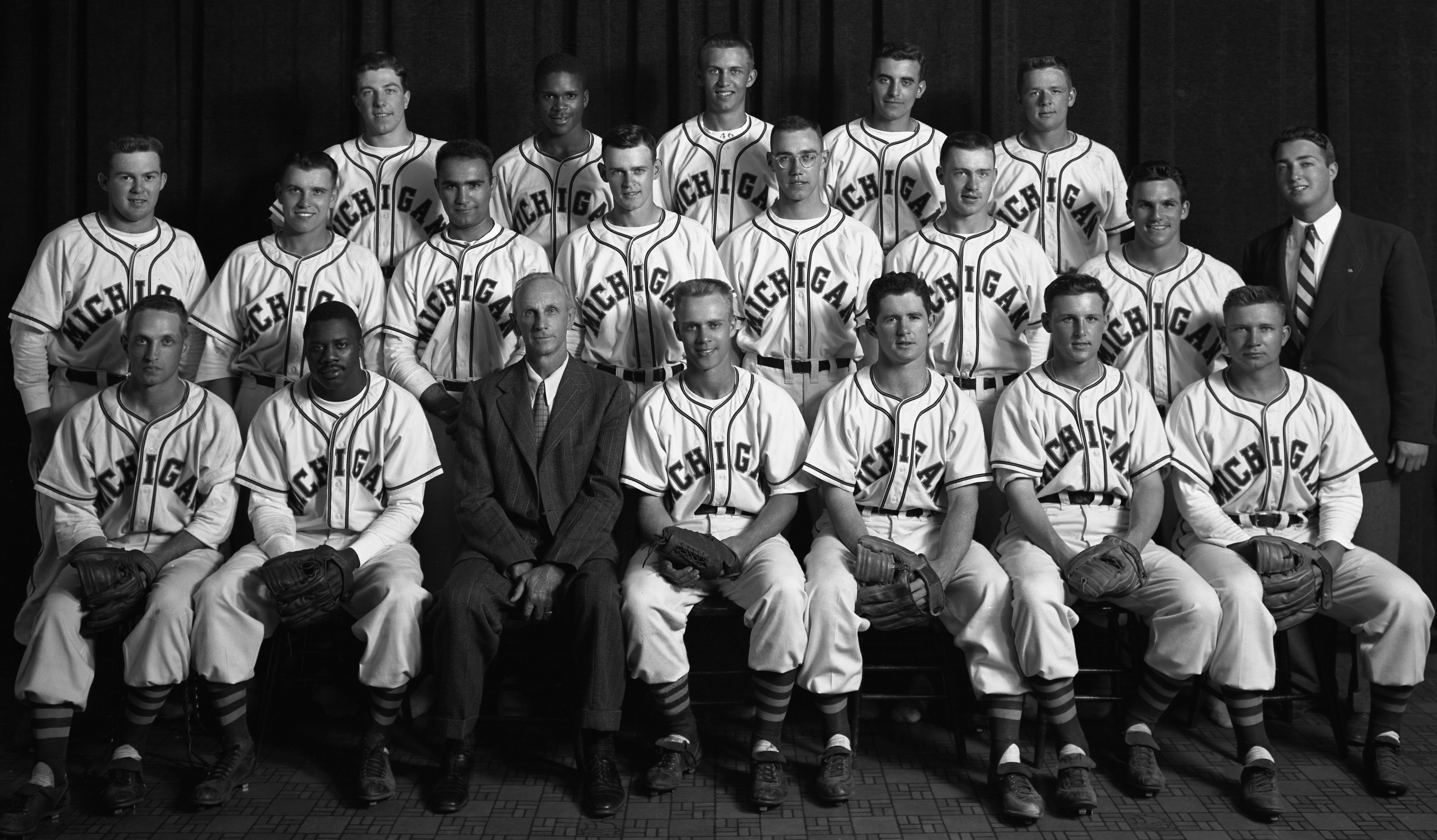
Michigan's 1953 NCAA national championship team.

== Championships ==
=== NCAA College World Series National Championships ===
Season	Record	Head coach
1953	21–9	Ray Fisher
1962	31–13	Don Lund

=== Conference Championships ===
Season	Conference	Record	Head coach
1899	Big Ten	5–2	H.T. Clarke
1901	Big Ten	8–2	Frank Sexton
1905	Big Ten	9–3	L.W. McAllister
1918	Big Ten	9–1	Carl Lundgren
1919	Big Ten	9–0	Carl Lundgren
1920	Big Ten	9–1	Carl Lundgren
1923	Big Ten	10–0	Ray Fisher
1924	Big Ten	8–2	Ray Fisher
1926	Big Ten	9–2	Ray Fisher
1928	Big Ten	11–1	Ray Fisher
1929	Big Ten	7–2	Ray Fisher
1936	Big Ten	9–1	Ray Fisher
1941	Big Ten	10–2	Ray Fisher
1942	Big Ten	10–2	Ray Fisher
1944	Big Ten	8–0	Ray Fisher
1945	Big Ten	8–0	Ray Fisher
1948	Big Ten	10–2	Ray Fisher
1949	Big Ten	8–4	Ray Fisher
1950	Big Ten	9–3	Ray Fisher
1952	Big Ten	8–4	Ray Fisher
1953	Big Ten	10–3	Ray Fisher
1961	Big Ten	10–2	Don Lund
1975	Big Ten	13–3	Moby Benedict
1976	Big Ten	9–4	Moby Benedict
1978	Big Ten	13–3	Moby Benedict
1980	Big Ten	14–2	Bud Middaugh
1981	Big Ten	10–4	Bud Middaugh
1983	Big Ten	13–2	Bud Middaugh
1984	Big Ten	11–5	Bud Middaugh
1986	Big Ten	13–3	Bud Middaugh
1987	Big Ten	13–3	Bud Middaugh
1997	Big Ten	17–9	Geoff Zahn
2006	Big Ten	23–9	Rich Maloney
2007	Big Ten	21–7	Rich Maloney
2008	Big Ten	26–5	Rich Maloney

=== Conference Tournament championships ===
Year	Conference	Tournament Location	Head coach
1981	Big Ten	Ray Fisher Stadium, Ann Arbor, MI	Bud Middaugh
1983	Big Ten	Ray Fisher Stadium, Ann Arbor, MI	Bud Middaugh
1984	Big Ten	Siebert Field, Minneapolis, MN	Bud Middaugh
1986	Big Ten	Siebert Field, Minneapolis, MN	Bud Middaugh
1987	Big Ten	Ray Fisher Stadium, Ann Arbor, MI	Bud Middaugh
1999	Big Ten	Bill Davis Stadium, Columbus, OH	Geoff Zahn
2006	Big Ten	Ray Fisher Stadium, Ann Arbor, MI	Rich Maloney
2008	Big Ten	Ray Fisher Stadium, Ann Arbor, MI	Rich Maloney
2015	Big Ten	Target Field, Minneapolis, MN	Erik Bakich
2022	Big Ten	Charles Schwab Field Omaha, Omaha, NE	Erik Bakich

== Stadium ==
The Wolverines play their home games in Ray Fisher Stadium. The stadium is named after Ray Fisher, who is the winningest coach in Michigan baseball history, with 636 victories and also the 1953 College World Series championship.

In 2008, alum and owner of the New York Mets MLB franchise, Fred Wilpon donated $9 million for the renovation of Fisher Stadium and Alumni Field. It is now known as the Wilpon Baseball and Softball Complex, but more commonly known as the Wilpon Baseball Complex.

Name	Years
Ferry Field	1923–1966
Ray Fisher Stadium	1967–2007
Ray Fisher Stadium at Wilpon Baseball Complex	2008–present

== Head coaches ==
Coach	Years	Seasons	Record	Pct
Peter Conway	1891–1892	2	22–9–1	.703
Frank Sexton	1896, 1901–1908	3	38–22	.633
Charles F. Watkins	1897–1898, 1900	3	16–17	.485
Henry T. Clarke	1898–1899	2	14–5	.737
R.C. "Skel" Roach	1903	1	12–5	.706
Jerome Utley	1904	1	10–5	.667
Lew "Sport" McAllister	1905–1906, 1908–1909	4	58–17–1	.770
Bobby Lowe	1907	1	11–4–1	.719
Branch Rickey	1910–1913	4	68–32–4	.673
Carl Lundgren	1914–1920	7	93–43–6	.676
Ray Fisher	1921–1958	38	636–295–8	.682
Don Lund	1959–1962	4	80–53–3	.599
Moby Benedict	1963–1979	18	367–252–5	.592
Bud Middaugh	1980–1989	10	465–146–1	.761
Bill Freehan	1990–1995	6	166–167–1	.499
Geoff Zahn	1996–2001	6	163–169–2	.491
Chris Harrison	2002	1	21–32	.396
Rich Maloney	2003–2012	10	341–244	.583
Erik Bakich	2013–2022	10	328–216	.603
Tracy Smith	2023–present	4	127–103	.552

== Year-by-year results ==
This is a partial list of the last five seasons completed by the Wolverines.

Year	Coach	Record	Notes
2022	Erik Bakich	34–28	NCAA Regional
2023	Tracy Smith	28–28	
2024	Tracy Smith	32–28	
2025	Tracy Smith	33–23	
2026	Tracy Smith	34–24	

== Michigan in the NCAA tournament ==
- The NCAA Division I baseball tournament started in 1947.
- The format of the tournament has changed through the years.

Year	Record	Pct	Notes
1953	4–1	.800	College World Series (Champions)
1961	2–2	.500	NCAA District 4 Regional
1962	8–2	.800	College World Series (Champions)
1975	3–2	.600	NCAA Mideast Regional
1976	3–1	.750	NCAA Mideast Regional
1977	2–2	.500	NCAA Midwest Regional
1978	4–2	.667	College World Series (5th Place)
1980	4–2	.667	College World Series (5th Place)
1981	4–3	.571	College World Series (7th Place)
1983	5–2	.714	College World Series (3rd Place)
1984	3–2	.600	College World Series (7th Place)
1985	3–2	.600	NCAA South I Regional
1986	0–2	.000	NCAA Mideast Regional
1987	1–2	.333	NCAA Northeast Regional
1988	2–2	.500	NCAA Central Regional
1989	3–2	.600	NCAA West II Regional
1999	2–2	.500	NCAA South Bend Regional
2005	1–2	.333	NCAA Atlanta Regional
2006	1–2	.333	NCAA Atlanta Regional
2007	3–3	.500	NCAA Corvallis Super Regional
2008	1–2	.333	NCAA Ann Arbor Regional
2015	2–2	.500	NCAA Louisville Regional
2017	0–2	.000	NCAA Chapel Hill Regional
2019	9–4	.692	College World Series (Runner-up)
2021	0–2	.000	NCAA South Bend Regional
2022	2–2	.500	NCAA Louisville Regional
TOTALS	72–54	.574	2 National Championships, 8 CWS Appearances

== First Team All-Americans ==
Player	Position	Year(s)	Selectors
Bruce Haynam	Shortstop	1953†	ABCA
Don Eaddy	Third Base	1955†	ABCA
Ken Tippery	Second Base	1957†	ABCA
Bill Freehan	Catcher	1961†	ABCA
Jim Burton	Pitcher	1971	SN
Steve Howe	Pitcher	1979	SN
Rick Leach	Outfield	1979	SN
Jim Paciorek	Outfield	1982†	ABCA, BA
Chris Sabo	Third Base	1983	BA, SN
Barry Larkin	Shortstop	1984, 1985†	ABCA, BA, SN
Mike Watters	Outfield	1985	BA
Casey Close	Outfield	1986†	ABCA, BA
Jim Abbott	Pitcher	1988	SN
Carmen Benedetti	Designated Hitter	2015	NCBWA
Jake Cronenworth	Utility	2015	ABCA
Source:"Baseball Record Book" (PDF). mgoblue.com. ABCA: American Baseball Coaches Association BA: Baseball America CB: Collegiate Baseball NCBWA: National Collegiate Baseball Writers Association SN: Sporting News † Denotes consensus All-American

== Individual honors ==
=== Retired numbers ===
Michigan has retired six uniform numbers to date. Below is the detailed list:

Retired numbers
No.	Player	Position	Career	No. retired
1	Moby Benedict	SS	1953–56	1979
11	Bill Freehan	C	1959–61	1977
16	Barry Larkin	SS	1983–85	2010
31	Jim Abbott	P	1986–88	2009
33	Don Lund	OF	1943–45	1999
44	Ray Fisher	Coach ^{1}	1921–58	2000

^{1} Never played for the Wolverines. He coached Michigan with a record 636 wins and led the team to 15 Big Ten championships apart from winning the 1953 College World Series.

=== National Awards ===
==== Golden Spikes Award Winner ====
- Jim Abbott (1987)

==== Baseball America College Player of the Year ====
- Casey Close (1986)

==== NCBWA National Coach of the Year ====
- Erik Bakich (2019)

=== Conference Awards ===
==== Big Ten Player of the Year ====
- Jim Paciorek (1982)
- Rick Stoll (1983)
- Barry Larkin (1984, 1985)
- Casey Close (1986)
- Jim Abbott (1988)
- Scott Weaver (1995)
- Nate Recknagel (2008)
- Jordan Brewer (2019)

==== Big Ten Pitcher of the Year ====
- Larry Carroll (1984)
- Jim Brauer (2005)
- Zach Putnam (2008)
- Connor O'Halloran (2023)

==== Big Ten Freshman of the Year ====
- Scott Weaver (1993)
- Jason Alcaraz (1996)
- Jake Bivens (2015)

==== Big Ten Coach of the Year ====
- Geoff Zahn (1997)
- Rich Maloney (2007, 2008)

==== Big Ten Batting Title ====
- Bill Freehan (1961; .585 batting average)
- Carl Cmejrek (1965; .453 batting average)
- Elliott Maddox (1968; .467 batting average)
- Rick Leach (1978; .473 batting average)
- George Foussianes (1979; .452 batting average)
- Tony Evans (1981; .465 batting average)
- Jim Paciorek, Ken Hayward (1982; .462 batting average)
- Fred Erdmann (1983; .500 batting average)
- Randy Wolfe (1985; .514 batting average)
- Casey Close (1986; .469 batting average)
- Scott Timmerman (1993; .431 batting average)
- Scott Weaver (1995; .500 batting average)
- Dominic Clementi (2018; .413 batting average)

=== University of Michigan Athletic Hall of Honor ===
The following 35 Michigan Wolverines baseball players and coaches (listed in order of induction) have been inducted into the University of Michigan Athletic Hall of Honor:

- Bill Freehan (1978) – baseball
- Bennie Oosterbaan (1978) – football, basketball, baseball, basketball coach, football coach
- Ray Fisher (1979) – baseball coach
- George Sisler (1979) – baseball
- Buck Giles (1980) – baseball
- Harry Kipke (1981) – football, basketball, and baseball
- Whitey Wistert (1981) – football and baseball
- Bud Chamberlain (1982) – baseball
- Jack Tompkins (1982) – hockey and baseball
- Elmer Gedeon (1983) – track and baseball
- Dick Wakefield (1983) – baseball
- Elroy Hirsch (1984) – football, basketball, baseball, and track
- Bob Chappuis (1984) – football and baseball
- Don Lund (1984) – football, baseball, basketball, and coaching
- Doug Roby (1985) – football and baseball
- Branch Rickey (1985) – baseball coach
- David M. Nelson (1986) – football and baseball
- Ernie McCoy (1986) basketball, football, basketball coach, and assistant athletic director
- Jack Blott (1987) – football and baseball
- Bruce Haynam (1988) – baseball
- Frank Nunley (1989) – football and baseball
- Forest Evashevski (1990) – football and baseball
- Jack Weisenburger (1992) – football and baseball
- Moby Benedict (1994) – baseball and coaching
- Dominic Tomasi (1994) – football and baseball
- Steve Boros (1996) – baseball
- Herman Fishman (2002) – basketball and baseball
- Bill Mogk (2002) – baseball
- Jim Abbott (2004) – baseball
- J. Daniel Cline (2007) – football and baseball
- Barry Larkin (2007) – baseball
- Larry Carroll (1991) - baseball
- David Campbell (2009) – baseball
- Rick Leach (2009) – football and baseball
- Casey Close (2011) – baseball
- Jim Paciorek (2020) – baseball

== Wolverines in MLB ==
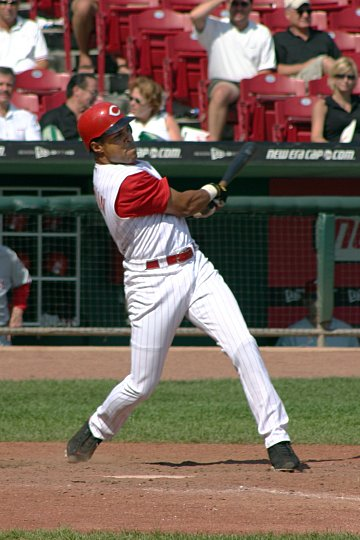
Barry Larkin

= Selected to the Major League Baseball Hall of Fame
= Major League Baseball All-Star Game participant

Player	Position	Team(s)	Years	World Series
Jim Abbott	Pitcher	CAL, NYY, CHW, MIL	1989–1999	0
Pete Appleton	Pitcher	CIN, CLE, BOS, NYY, WSH, CHW, SLB	1927–1945	0
Fred Blanding	Pitcher	CLE	1910–1914	0
Frank Bliss	Catcher/Third Baseman	MLG	1878	0
Jack Blott	Catcher	CIN	1924	0
Steve Boros	Third Baseman	DET, CHC, CIN	1957–1965	0
Frank Bowerman	Catcher	BLN, PIT, NYG, BSN	1895–1909	0
James Bourque	Pitcher	WSN	2019–present	0
Jim Burton	Pitcher	BOS	1975–1977	0
Dave Campbell	Second Baseman	DET, SDP, STL, HOU	1967–1974	0
Mike Cervenak	Third Baseman	PHI	2008	0
Jeff Criswell	Pitcher	COL	2024–present	0
Jake Cronenworth	Second Baseman	SDP	2020–present	0
Kelly Dransfeldt	Shortstop	TEX, CHW	1999–2004	0
Don Eaddy	Third Baseman	CHC	1959	0
Hal Elliott	Pitcher	PHI	1929–1932	0
Jack Enzenroth	Catcher	SLB, KCP	1914–1915	0
Danny Fife	Pitcher	MIN	1973–1974	0
Fritz Fisher	Pitcher	DET	1964	0
Jake Fox	Utility	CHC, OAK, BAL	2007–2011	0
Bill Freehan	Catcher	DET	1961–1976	1
Elmer Gedeon	Centerfielder	WSH	1939	0
Johnny Gee	Pitcher	PIT, NYG	1939–1946	0
Chris Getz	Second Baseman	CHW, KCR, TOR	2008–2014	0
Bob Glenn	Pitcher	STL	1920	0
Tommy Henry	Pitcher	ARI	2022–present	0
John Herrnstein	First Baseman/Leftfielder	PHI, CHC, ATL	1962–1966	0
John Hibbard	Pitcher	CHC	1884	0
Rich Hill	Pitcher	CHC, BAL, BOS, CLE, LAA, NYY, OAK, LAD, MIN, TBR, NYM, PIT, SDP	2005–present	0
Steve Howe	Pitcher	LAD, MIN, TEX, NYY	1980–1996	2
Mike Ignasiak	Pitcher	MIL	1991–1995	0
Mike Joyce	Pitcher	CHW	1962–1963	0
Scott Kamieniecki	Pitcher	NYY, BAL, CLE, ATL	1991–2000	1
Karl Kauffmann	Pitcher	COL	2023–present	0
Red Killefer	Outfielder/Second Baseman	DET, WSH, CIN, NYG	1907–1916	0
Mike Knode	Outfielder/Second Baseman	STL	1920	0
Ray Knode	First Baseman	CLE	1923–1926	0
Dennis Konuszewski	Pitcher	PIT	1995	0
Bobby Korecky	Pitcher	MIN, ARI, TOR	2008–2014	0
Ryan LaMarre	Outfielder	CIN, BOS, OAK, MIN, CHW, NYY	2015–present	0
Chick Lathers	Third Baseman/Second Baseman	DET	1910–1911	0
Doc Lavan	Shortstop	SLB, PHA, WSH, STL	1913–1924	0

Player	Position	Team(s)	Years	World Series
Barry Larkin	Shortstop	CIN	1986–2004	1
Rick Leach	Outfielder/First Baseman	DET, TOR, TEX, SFG	1981–1990	0
Dick LeMay	Pitcher	SFG, CHC	1961–1963	0
Don Lund	Outfielder	BRO, SLB, DET	1945–1954	0
Tom Lundstedt	Catcher	CHC, MIN	1973–1975	0
Elliott Maddox	Centerfielder/Third Baseman	DET, WSA/TEX, NYY, BAL, NYM	1970–1980	0
Mike Matheny	Catcher	MIL, TOR, STL, SFG	1994–2006	0
Bill McAfee	Pitcher	CHC, BSN, WSH, SLB	1930–1934	0
Hal Morris	First Baseman	NYY, CIN, KCR, DET	1988–2000	1
Bud Morse	Second Baseman	PHA	1929	0
Kirt Ojala	Pitcher	FLA	1997–1999	1
Steve Ontiveros	Pitcher	OAK, PHI, SEA, BOS	1991–1995	0
Jim Paciorek	First Baseman/Third Baseman	MIL	1987	0
Slicker Parks	Pitcher	DET	1921	0
Jack Perrin	Rightfielder	BOS	1921	0
Ted Petoskey	Centerfielder	CIN	1934–1935	0
Ross Powell	Pitcher	CIN, HOU, PIT	1993–1995	0
Zach Putnam	Pitcher	CLE, COL, CHC, CHW	2011–2017	0
J. J. Putz	Pitcher	SEA, NYM, CHW, ARI	2003–2014	0
Glenn Redmon	Second Baseman	SFG	1974	0
Bob Reed	Pitcher	DET	1969–1970	0
Clayton Richard	Pitcher	CHW, SDP, CHC, TOR	2008–2019	0
Branch Rickey	Catcher	SLB, NYY	1905–1914	0 (4 as executive)
Leon Roberts	Outfielder	DET, HOU, SEA, TEX, TOR, KCR	1974–1984	0
Bill Roman	First Baseman	DET	1964–1965	0
Chris Sabo	Third Baseman	CIN, BAL, CHW, STL	1988–1996	1
Bobby Scales	Leftfielder/Third Baseman	CHC	2009–2010	0
Frank Sexton	Pitcher	BSN	1895	0
Brian Simmons	Outfielder	CHW, TOR	1998–2001	0
Bert Sincock	Pitcher	CIN	1908	0
George Sisler	First Baseman	SLB, WSH, BSN	1915–1930	0
Ted Sizemore	Second Baseman	LAD, STL, PHI, CHC, BOS	1969–1980	0
Lary Sorensen	Pitcher	MIL, STL, CLE, OAK, CHC, MON, SFG	1977–1988	0
Ernie Vick	Catcher	STL	1922–1926	1
Dick Wakefield	Leftfielder	DET, NYY, NYG	1941–1952	0
Fleet Walker	Catcher	TOL	1884	0
Welday Walker	Leftfielder	TOL	1884	0
Gary Wayne	Pitcher	MIN, COL, LAD	1989–1994	0
Whitey Wistert	Pitcher	CIN	1934	0
Geoff Zahn	Pitcher	LAD, CHC, MIN, CAL	1973–1985	0
Bill Zepp	Pitcher	MIN, DET	1969–1971	0

Note: Charlie Gehringer, Derek Jeter, and Ted Simmons are Baseball Hall of Fame inductees who were enrolled at Michigan, but never played for the baseball team.

Source: Baseball Reference

=== First-Round MLB Draft Picks ===
Pick	Player	Team	Position	Year
13	Rick Leach	Detroit Tigers	OF	1979
16	Steve Howe	Los Angeles Dodgers	LHP	1979
25	Steve Perry	Los Angeles Dodgers	RHP	1979
14	Rich Stoll	Montreal Expos	RHP	1983
4	Barry Larkin	Cincinnati Reds	SS	1985
8	Jim Abbott	California Angels	LHP	1988
28	David Parrish	New York Yankees	C	2000
38	Mitch Voit	New York Mets	2B	2025

== See also ==
- List of NCAA Division I baseball programs
- Big Ten baseball tournament
- Big Ten baseball champions
