= Kaden Polcovich =

American baseball player (born 1999)

Free agent
- Second baseman
- Born: February 21, 1999 (age 27); Edmond, Oklahoma, U.S.
- Bats: Switch Throws: Right
- Stats at Baseball Reference

Kaden James Polcovich (born February 21, 1999) is an American professional baseball second baseman who is a free agent. He was selected by the Seattle Mariners in the third round of the 2020 Major League Baseball draft.

== Amateur career ==
Polcovich attended Deer Creek High School in Edmond, Oklahoma. After his junior year 2016, in which he batted .321 with 26 RBIs, he committed to play college baseball at the University of Kentucky. Polcovich was not selected in the 2017 Major League Baseball draft and enrolled at Kentucky.

Polcovich was dismissed from the Kentucky baseball team during the first semester of his freshman year. He did not play for the Wildcats in a game. He left Kentucky and enrolled at Northwest Florida State College, where he hit .280 with three home runs, 18 RBIs, and 13 stolen bases over 40 games as a freshman in 2018, then batting .273 with 12 home runs and 38 RBIs over 53 games as a sophomore in 2019. After his sophomore year, he played collegiate summer baseball with the Chatham Anglers of the Cape Cod Baseball League and was named a league all-star. He also transferred to Oklahoma State University. As a junior at Oklahoma State in 2020, he batted .344 with two home runs in 21 games before the season was cancelled due to the COVID-19 pandemic.

== Professional career ==
Polcovich was selected by the Seattle Mariners in the third round, with the 78th overall pick, of the 2020 Major League Baseball draft. He signed for $575,000.

Polcovich made his professional debut in 2021 with the Everett AquaSox of the High-A West with whom he batted .271/.415/.505 with ten home runs, 47 RBIs, and 16 stolen bases over 58 games. He was promoted to the Arkansas Travelers of the Double-A South in late July, slashing .133/.242/.211 with two home runs, 14 RBIs, and four doubles over 36 games to end the season. He returned to Arkansas for the 2022 season. Over 118 games, he batted .242/.345/.386 with 12 home runs, 60 RBIs, and 18 stolen bases. He repeated in Double-A in 2023 and 2024, not raising his batting average or on-base plus slugging above his 2022 numbers. He did not play in the minors in 2025.

On March 2, 2026, Polcovich signed with the Kansas City Monarchs of the American Association of Professional Baseball. He was released by the team on May 9, 2026, prior to the beginning of the regular season.

== Personal life ==
Polcovich's father, Kevin Polcovich played in Major League Baseball for the Pittsburgh Pirates in 1997 and 1998.
