= Kevin Polcovich =

American baseball player (born 1970)

- Shortstop
- Born: June 28, 1970 (age 55); Auburn, New York, U.S.
- Batted: Right Threw: Right

MLB debut
- May 17, 1997, for the Pittsburgh Pirates

Last MLB appearance
- September 22, 1998, for the Pittsburgh Pirates

MLB statistics
- Batting average: .234
- Home runs: 4
- Runs batted in: 35
- Stats at Baseball Reference

Teams
- Pittsburgh Pirates (1997–1998)

Kevin Michael Polcovich (born June 28, 1970) is an American former professional baseball player who was a utility infielder for the Pittsburgh Pirates in two Major League Baseball seasons during the 1990s.

== Early life ==
Polcovich was born in Auburn, New York. He attended Auburn High School, and played for the Auburn Maroons baseball team.

== Collegiate career ==
Polcovich attended Gulf Coast Community College. In 1990 he played collegiate summer baseball with the Hyannis Mets of the Cape Cod Baseball League. He attended the University of Florida, where he played shortstop for coach Joe Arnold's Florida Gators baseball team in 1991 and 1992. He participated in the College World Series in 1991, and received All-Southeastern Conference (SEC), SEC All-Tournament, and College World Series All-Tournament honors. Polcovich holds the NCAA Division I record for most fielding assists in a game, with 14 on April 27, 1991.

== Professional career ==
The Pittsburgh Pirates selected Polcovich in the 30th round of the 1992 MLB draft. He made his Major League debut on May 17, 1997.

Polcovich is most remembered for his key role as a member of Pittsburgh's 1997 "Freak Show" team. Prior to the season, new ownership had dismantled the team and launched a team rebuild. The team's opening day payroll was $9 million, by far the lowest in the major leagues. Expectations were very low for the Pirates, but perhaps none were lower than for Polcovich, who was bagging groceries to help support himself during spring training. When the Pirates' starting shortstop was injured in May, Polcovich got his call-up to the majors, and the former bag boy was now the new starting shortstop. He quickly became the anchor of the Pirates infield and helped the team compete for the NL Central Division until the final week of the season, when they were finally eliminated by ultimate division champions, the Houston Astros.

Polcovich only played one more year of major league baseball.

== Personal life ==
Polcovich and his wife, Lisa, have two children, Kaden and Teagan. His wife and children were all collegiate athletes. Lisa played volleyball for the Florida Gators. Kaden was drafted in the third round of the 2020 MLB draft by the Seattle Mariners. He attended Northwest Florida State College and Oklahoma State University. Teagan played volleyball for Missouri State University after being coached by Lisa in high school.

== See also ==
- List of Florida Gators baseball players
- Pittsburgh Pirates all-time roster
