= Scott Medvin =

American baseball player (born 1961)

- Pitcher
- Born: September 16, 1961 (age 64); North Olmsted, Ohio, U.S.
- Batted: Right Threw: Right

MLB debut
- May 9, 1988, for the Pittsburgh Pirates

Last MLB appearance
- September 22, 1990, for the Seattle Mariners

MLB statistics
- Win–loss record: 3–2
- Earned run average: 5.17
- Strikeouts: 21
- Stats at Baseball Reference

Teams
- Pittsburgh Pirates (1988–1989); Seattle Mariners (1990)

Scott Howard Medvin (born September 16, 1961) is an American former professional baseball pitcher. He played parts of three seasons in Major League Baseball for the Pittsburgh Pirates (1988–89) and Seattle Mariners (1990).

== Early life and education ==
Medvin attended North Olmsted High School in North Olmstead, Ohio and Baldwin Wallace University in Berea, Ohio, where he earned a degree in management. He was named to the All-Ohio Athletic Conference as a senior.

== Career ==
He signed as an undrafted free agent by the Detroit Tigers on September 27, 1983.

Medvin was dealt several times before reaching the majors. He was loaned to the Mariners in 1984, making his professional debut with the Wausau Mariners. The Tigers sent him to the San Francisco Giants on December 11, 1985, as the player to be named later in a trade sending Juan Berenguer and Bob Melvin to the Giants for Eric King, Dave LaPoint, and Matt Nokes. On August 21, 1987, the Giants traded Medvin and fellow reliever Jeff Robinson to the Pirates for pitcher Rick Reuschel. After the 1987 season, the Houston Astros selected Medvin in the Rule 5 draft, but he was returned to the Pirates in April 1988 after not making Houston's opening day roster.

Medvin made his MLB debut on May 9 against San Francisco. He earned a win on May 11 against the Los Angeles Dodgers. He was sent back to the minors after posting a 5.28 ERA in 7 appearances, returning as a September call-up. He earned his third and final MLB win in a game at Wrigley Field attended by President Ronald Reagan. Medvin pitched in a career-high 17 MLB games and, in Triple-A, had 12 saves for the Buffalo Bisons. Medvin again pitched primarily in Buffalo in 1989, earning 10 saves. He made six appearances for the Pirates, with a 5.68 ERA.

On May 18, 1990, Pittsburgh traded Medvin to the Mariners for Lee Hancock. Medvin pitched in 5 games for the Mariners with a 6.23 ERA in 4 1/3 innings, ending in MLB career. He pitched for Industriales de Monterrey in the Mexican League in 1991, Monterrey and Saraperos de Saltillo in 1992, and Saltillo and Rieleros de Aguascalientes in 1993.
