= Dennis Konuszewski =

American baseball player (born 1971)

- Pitcher
- Born: February 4, 1971 (age 55); Bridgeport, Michigan
- Batted: Right Threw: Right

MLB debut
- August 4, 1995, for the Pittsburgh Pirates

Last MLB appearance
- August 4, 1995, for the Pittsburgh Pirates

MLB statistics
- Games played: 1
- Innings pitched: 0.1
- Earned runs: 2
- Stats at Baseball Reference

Teams
- Pittsburgh Pirates (1995)

Dennis John Konuszewski (born February 4, 1971) is an American former professional baseball pitcher with the Pittsburgh Pirates of Major League Baseball. He appeared in one game with the Pirates during the 1995 season.

== Amateur career ==
Konuszewski attended Bridgeport High School in Bridgeport, Michigan where he played baseball, basketball and football. As a junior in 1988, he had an earned run average of 1.47 followed by a 0.78 ERA in 1989. Over his final two seasons of high school he tallied 187 strikeouts in 129 innings. He was named all-state as both a junior and a senior and won multiple Michigan baseball player of the year awards.

After recruiting trips to Central Michigan, Texas A&M, Cal State Fullerton and Portland State, Konuszewski committed to play college baseball for Michigan. Konuszewski chose to attend Michigan despite being taken in the fifteenth round of the 1989 MLB draft by the New York Yankees. At Michigan, Konuszewski formed a battery with Mike Matheny and would become the team's top starting pitcher. In 1991, he played collegiate summer baseball with the Falmouth Commodores of the Cape Cod Baseball League, where he posted a 1.79 ERA over 40.1 innings.

== Professional career ==
Konuszewski was drafted again in 1992, this time in the seventh round by the Pittsburgh Pirates. Konuszewski began his professional career in Pittsburgh's farm system. He was pitching what he considered to be his "best [season] as a professional pitcher" in 1994 when his progress was interrupted by the 1994–95 Major League Baseball strike. That offseason, he pitched in the Arizona Fall League where he had the distinction of striking out Scottsdale Scorpions outfielder Michael Jordan in a nationally televised game.

On August 4, 1995, Konuszewski relieved Steve Parris in his first and final Major League Baseball game. Konuszewski faced five Houston Astros batters, among them future Hall of Famer Craig Biggio. Konuszewski allowed four of them to reach base before manager Jim Leyland pulled him from the game. By 1997, Konuszewski was relegated to Double-A at 26 years old. After 15 games that season, he asked for his release and quietly retired.

== Personal ==
By 2017, Konuszewski had returned to Michigan where he managed the North Saginaw Township team to the 2017 Junior League World Series. As of 2018, he and his wife, Marcia, pronounced Mar-cee-ah, had two children and Konuszewski had been working in sales for Stryker Corporation for over a decade. In 2018, he was inducted into the sports hall of fame for Saginaw County.
