= John Ericks =

American baseball player (born 1967)

- Pitcher
- Born: September 16, 1967 (age 59); Oak Lawn, Illinois, U.S.
- Batted: Right Threw: Right

MLB debut
- June 24, 1995, for the Pittsburgh Pirates

Last MLB appearance
- April 28, 1997, for the Pittsburgh Pirates

MLB statistics
- Win–loss record: 8–14
- Earned run average: 4.78
- Strikeouts: 132
- Stats at Baseball Reference

Teams
- Pittsburgh Pirates (1995–1997)

John Edward Ericks II (born September 16, 1967) is an American former Major League Baseball pitcher who was a first-round draft pick in 1988 by the St. Louis Cardinals. He played for three seasons for the Pittsburgh Pirates from 1995 to 1997, appearing in 57 career games.

A native of Tinley Park, Illinois, Ericks attended the University of Illinois at Urbana-Champaign, and in 1987 he played collegiate summer baseball with the Chatham A's of the Cape Cod Baseball League.
