= Ravelo Manzanillo =

Dominican baseball player (born 1963)

- Pitcher
- Born: October 17, 1963 (age 62); San Pedro de Macorís, Dominican Republic
- Batted: Left Threw: Left

MLB debut
- September 25, 1988, for the Chicago White Sox

Last MLB appearance
- May 9, 1995, for the Pittsburgh Pirates

MLB statistics
- Win–loss record: 4–3
- Earned run average: 4.43
- Strikeouts: 50

CPBL statistics
- Win–loss record: 17–13
- Earned run average: 3.02
- Strikeouts: 212

KBO statistics
- Win–loss record: 8–11
- Earned run average: 4.32
- Strikeouts: 122
- Stats at Baseball Reference

Teams
- Chicago White Sox (1988); Brother Elephants (1992); Pittsburgh Pirates (1993–1995); China Times Eagles (1996); LG Twins (2002)

Career highlights and awards
- Taiwan Series champion (1992)

Ravelo Manzanillo Adams (born October 17, 1963) is a Dominican former pitcher in Major League Baseball.

== Career ==
Manzanillo played with the Chicago White Sox and Pittsburgh Pirates over parts of three seasons spanning 1988–1994. Listed at 6 ft 1 in (1.85 m), 210 pounds (95 kg), he batted and threw left-handed.

Manzanillo posted a 4–3 record with a 4.43 earned run average in 53 games for the White Sox and Pirates. He also spent 18 seasons in the Minor Leagues from 1981 to 2005, including stints in the Korea, Taiwan and Mexico baseball circuits.

In between, Manzanillo played winter ball with the Leones del Caracas club of the Venezuelan League, and for the Tigres de Licey and Leones del Escogido of the Dominican League. In addition, he served as a reinforcement for the Águilas Cibaeñas in the 1986 Caribbean Series.

== Personal ==
His brother, Josías Manzanillo, played eleven seasons for eight teams. On June 30, 1994, they became the first pair of brothers to both earn a save on the same day.

== Sources ==
- Career statistics from Baseball Reference · Baseball Reference (Minors) · Retrosheet · Baseball Almanac, or Retrosheet
