= Ramón Morel =

Dominican baseball player (born 1974)

- Pitcher
- Born: August 15, 1974 (age 51); Villa González, Dominican Republic
- Batted: Right Threw: Right

Professional debut
- MLB: July 6, 1995, for the Pittsburgh Pirates
- CPBL: August 7, 2002, for the Sinon Bulls
- NPB: April 11, 2004, for the Hanshin Tigers

Last appearance
- MLB: September 27, 1997, for the Chicago Cubs
- NPB: August 31, 2004, for the Hanshin Tigers
- CPBL: April 18, 2007, for the La New Bears

MLB statistics
- Win–loss record: 2–2
- Earned run average: 4.98
- Strikeouts: 32

CPBL statistics
- Win–loss record: 6–5
- Earned run average: 1.76
- Strikeouts: 131

NPB statistics
- Win–loss record: 0–1
- Earned run average: 3.67
- Strikeouts: 20
- Stats at Baseball Reference

Teams
- Pittsburgh Pirates (1995–1997); Chicago Cubs (1997); Sinon Bulls (2002–2003); Hanshin Tigers (2004); La New Bears (2006–2007)

Career highlights and awards
- Taiwan Series champion (2006)

Ramón Rafael Morel (born August 15, 1974) is a Dominican former professional baseball pitcher. Morel played for the Pittsburgh Pirates from 1995 to 1997 and with the Chicago Cubs in 1997.
