= Freddy García (infielder) =

Dominican baseball player (born 1972)

- Third baseman / Left fielder
- Born: August 1, 1972 (age 53); La Romana, Dominican Republic
- Batted: Right Threw: Right

MLB debut
- May 2, 1995, for the Pittsburgh Pirates

Last MLB appearance
- October 3, 1999, for the Atlanta Braves

MLB statistics
- Batting average: .222
- Home runs: 19
- Runs batted in: 56
- Stats at Baseball Reference

Teams
- Pittsburgh Pirates (1995, 1997–1999); Atlanta Braves (1999); Osaka Kintetsu Buffaloes (2001)

Freddy Adrian Garcia Felix (born August 1, 1972) is a Dominican former Major League Baseball (MLB) infielder. He played during four seasons at the major league level for the Pittsburgh Pirates and Atlanta Braves. He was signed by the Toronto Blue Jays as an amateur free agent in 1991. Garcia played his first professional season (in American baseball) with their Rookie league Medicine Hat Blue Jays in 1993, and his last season with the Boston Red Sox's Triple-A Pawtucket Red Sox in 2000.
