= Mark Johnson (first baseman) =

American baseball player (born 1967)

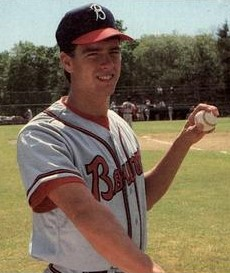
- First baseman
- Born: October 17, 1967 (age 58); Worcester, Massachusetts, U.S.
- Batted: Left Threw: Left

MLB debut
- April 26, 1995, for the Pittsburgh Pirates

Last MLB appearance
- June 2, 2002, for the New York Mets

MLB statistics
- Batting average: .232
- Home runs: 38
- Runs batted im: 137
- Stats at Baseball Reference

Teams
- Pittsburgh Pirates (1995–1997); Anaheim Angels (1998); Hanshin Tigers (1999); New York Mets (2000–2002)

Mark Patrick Johnson (born October 17, 1967) is an American former professional baseball first baseman who played in Major League Baseball (MLB). He played from 1995–2002 for the Pittsburgh Pirates, Anaheim Angels, and New York Mets. He also played one season in Japan for the Hanshin Tigers in 1999. He currently works as a trader on Wall Street.
