= Lee Hancock =

American baseball player (born 1967)

- Pitcher
- Born: June 27, 1967 (age 58); North Hollywood, California, U.S.
- Batted: Left Threw: Left

MLB debut
- September 3, 1995, for the Pittsburgh Pirates

Last MLB appearance
- May 13, 1996, for the Pittsburgh Pirates

MLB statistics
- Win–loss record: 0-0
- Earned run average: 4.45
- Strikeouts: 19
- Stats at Baseball Reference

Teams
- Pittsburgh Pirates (1995–1996)

Leland David Hancock (born June 27, 1967) is an American former professional baseball player. He played two seasons in Major League Baseball as a pitcher for the Pittsburgh Pirates.

Hancock was selected by the Seattle Mariners in the fourth round of the 1988 Major League Baseball draft out of Cal Poly. On May 18, 1990, Hancock was traded to the Pirates in exchange for pitcher Scott Medvin and assigned to Double-A Harrisburg. In September 1995, he was called up to the majors along with Rick White. He made his Major League debut on September 3, 1995. He entered the game in the eighth inning in relief of Paul Wagner and allowed a run-scoring double to Brian Hunter, the only batter he faced. He pitched his final Major League game on May 13, 1996. He spent the remainder of the 1996 season, as well as the 1997 season, in the farm systems of the San Francisco Giants and Chicago Cubs. The 1997 season was his final as a professional baseball player.
