= Mike Dyer (baseball) =

American baseball player (born 1966)

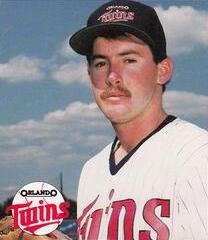
- Dyer with the Orlando Twins c. 1988
- Pitcher
- Born: September 8, 1966 (age 59); Upland, California, U.S.
- Batted: Right Threw: Right

MLB debut
- May 29, 1989, for the Minnesota Twins

Last MLB appearance
- September 28, 1996, for the Montreal Expos

MLB statistics
- Win–loss record: 14–18
- Earned run average: 4.60
- Strikeouts: 154
- Stats at Baseball Reference

Teams
- Minnesota Twins (1989); Pittsburgh Pirates (1994–1995); Montreal Expos (1996)

Michael Lawrence Dyer (born September 8, 1966), is a retired Major League Baseball pitcher. He played all or part of four seasons in the majors, between 1989 and 1996, for the Minnesota Twins, Pittsburgh Pirates, and Montreal Expos.
