= Rich Aude =

American baseball player (born 1971)

- First baseman
- Born: July 13, 1971 (age 55); Van Nuys, California, U.S.
- Batted: Right Threw: Right

MLB debut
- September 9, 1993, for the Pittsburgh Pirates

Last MLB appearance
- May 15, 1996, for the Pittsburgh Pirates

MLB statistics
- Batting average: .225
- Home runs: 2
- Runs batted in: 24
- Stats at Baseball Reference

Teams
- Pittsburgh Pirates (1993, 1995–1996)

Richard Thomas Aude (born July 13, 1971) is an American former professional baseball player who played first base in 1993 and from 1995 to 1996 for the Pittsburgh Pirates of the Major League Baseball (MLB). He is the brother of Grammy-winning producer, house DJ, and remixer Dave Audé.

A viral video of Aude pimping his walk-off home run to end a May 1994 game at Pilot Field between the Buffalo Bisons and Louisville Redbirds was covered by media outlets such as Deadspin and MLB.com.
