= Angelo Encarnación =

Dominican baseball player (born 1969)

- Catcher
- Born: April 18, 1969 (age 57); Santo Domingo, Dominican Republic
- Batted: Right Threw: Right

MLB debut
- May 2, 1995, for the Pittsburgh Pirates

Last MLB appearance
- September 27, 1997, for the Anaheim Angels

MLB statistics
- Batting average: .253
- Home runs: 3
- Runs batted in: 15
- Stats at Baseball Reference

Teams
- Pittsburgh Pirates (1995–1996); Anaheim Angels (1997)

Eleutero Benjamin "Angelo" Encarnación (born April 18, 1969) is a Dominican former professional baseball catcher. He previously in Major League Baseball (MLB) for the Pittsburgh Pirates and Anaheim Angels.

== Career ==
During a game against the Los Angeles Dodgers on August 12, 1995, Encarnacion made an unusual mistake that ultimately cost the Pirates the game. Encarnacion entered the game in the top of the eleventh inning with the score tied at 10–10, as a pinch runner for the Pirates' starting catcher, Mark Parent. The Pirates failed to score, and Encarnacion remained in the game as the catcher. Later that inning, with one out and Roberto Kelly on third base, Encarnacion casually scooped up a bouncing ball with his face mask. This was a violation of MLB's rarely invoked Rule 7.05 (d), which allows runners on base to advance under that circumstance, permitting Kelly to score the game-winning run uncontested.
