= Gary Wilson (1990s pitcher) =

American baseball player (born 1970)

- Pitcher
- Born: January 1, 1970 (age 56); Arcata, California, U.S.
- Batted: Right Threw: Right

MLB debut
- April 28, 1995, for the Pittsburgh Pirates

Last MLB appearance
- June 14, 1995, for the Pittsburgh Pirates

MLB statistics
- Win–loss record: 0-1
- Earned run average: 5.02
- Strikeouts: 8
- Stats at Baseball Reference

Teams
- Pittsburgh Pirates (1995)

Gary Morris Wilson (born January 1, 1970) is an American former professional baseball pitcher. He played part of one season in Major League Baseball (MLB) for the Pittsburgh Pirates in 1995.

== Career ==
Wilson was drafted by the Pirates in the 18th round of the 1992 MLB draft. Wilson played his first professional season with the Low-A Welland Pirates and Single-A Augusta Pirates in 1995, and split his last season between their Triple-A Nashville Sounds and the Minnesota Twins' Triple-A Salt Lake Buzz in 1998.
