= Jacob Brumfield =

American baseball player (born 1965)

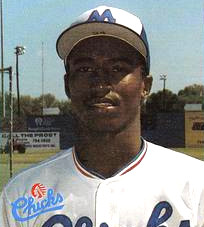
- Brumfield in 1988
- Outfielder
- Born: May 27, 1965 (age 61); Bogalusa, Louisiana, U.S.
- Batted: Right Threw: Right

MLB debut
- April 6, 1992, for the Cincinnati Reds

Last MLB appearance
- September 30, 1999, for the Los Angeles Dodgers

MLB statistics
- Batting average: .257
- Home runs: 32
- Runs batted in: 162
- Stats at Baseball Reference

Teams
- Cincinnati Reds (1992–1994); Pittsburgh Pirates (1995–1996); Toronto Blue Jays (1996–1999); Los Angeles Dodgers (1999)

Jacob Donnell Brumfield (born May 27, 1965) is an American former professional baseball outfielder. He played in Major League Baseball (MLB) for the Cincinnati Reds, Pittsburgh Pirates, Toronto Blue Jays, and Los Angeles Dodgers from 1992 to 1999. He is best known for being involved in a collision with fellow Pirates outfielder Dave Clark during the 1995 season.
