= Steve Pegues =

American baseball player (born 1968)

- Outfielder
- Born: May 21, 1968 (age 57); Pontotoc, Mississippi, U.S.
- Batted: Right Threw: Right

MLB debut
- June 3, 1994, for the Cincinnati Reds

Last MLB appearance
- September 29, 1995, for the Pittsburgh Pirates

MLB statistics
- Batting average: .266
- Home runs: 6
- Runs batted in: 18

CPBL statistics
- Batting average: .282
- Home runs: 1
- Runs batted in: 12
- Stats at Baseball Reference

Teams
- Cincinnati Reds (1994); Pittsburgh Pirates (1994–1995); Mercuries Tigers (1999)

Steven Antone Pegues (born May 21, 1968) is an American former Major League Baseball player.

== Career ==
Pegues was drafted in the first round of the 1987 amateur draft by the Detroit Tigers and debuted with the Cincinnati Reds on July 6, 1994. During his rookie campaign he batted .361 in 18 games with both the Reds and the Pittsburgh Pirates.
