= Ross Powell =

American baseball player (1968–2017)

- Pitcher
- Born: January 24, 1968; Grand Rapids, Michigan, U.S.
- Died: October 25, 2017 (aged 49); Lucas, Texas, U.S.
- Batted: Left Threw: Left

MLB debut
- September 5, 1993, for the Cincinnati Reds

Last MLB appearance
- September 30, 1995, for the Pittsburgh Pirates

MLB statistics
- Win–loss record: 0–5
- Earned run average: 5.40
- Strikeouts: 42
- Innings pitched: 531/3
- Stats at Baseball Reference

Teams
- Cincinnati Reds (1993); Houston Astros (1994–1995); Pittsburgh Pirates (1995)

Ross John Powell (January 24, 1968 – October 25, 2017) was an American Major League Baseball pitcher who played for the Cincinnati Reds, Houston Astros and Pittsburgh Pirates over parts of three seasons (1993–95). A left-hander, he was listed as 6 feet (1.83 m) tall and 180 pounds (82 kg).

A native of Grand Rapids, Michigan, he attended the University of Michigan, and in 1988 he played collegiate summer baseball with the Harwich Mariners of the Cape Cod Baseball League.

Powell was a third-round selection by Cincinnati in the 1989 Major League Baseball draft. He was called up by the Reds at the end of his fifth professional season and debuted on September 5, 1993, against the Philadelphia Phillies, when he threw two innings of one-hit relief. In his second appearance, six days later against the Montreal Expos, Powell took the mound for one of his four career starting assignments. He allowed two earned runs and three hits in four innings, and left for a pinch hitter with the Reds trailing, 2–1. He was charged with the loss in an eventual 4–2 Montreal victory. Powell then absorbed two more losses in relief over the season's last month.

In April 1994, Powell was traded to Houston in a deal for catcher Ed Taubensee. He spent much of that year at Triple-A, but made 12 appearances in relief in June and August for the Astros. He faced 32 batters in only 71/3 innings pitched, but was effective: although he allowed six hits and five bases on balls, he surrendered only one earned run, for a 1.23 ERA. That MLB season was curtailed by a players' strike on August 12, one day after Powell, pitching against the San Diego Padres, surrendered the earned run.

The 1995 season started late because of the strike. Powell made seven relief appearances for Houston between April 27 and May 13, but was treated harshly, allowing ten hits, eight bases on balls and nine earned runs in five innings pitched. He returned to Triple-A for six weeks, then was recalled by the Astros in July. His effectiveness returned, as he allowed two earned runs in four innings pitched and eight appearances. Then, on July 28, his contract was sold to the Pirates.

After four appearances out of the Pittsburgh bullpen, Powell was given three starting assignments in mid-August by Pirate manager Jim Leyland. He received no-decisions against the Florida Marlins on August 19 and the Colorado Rockies on August 24, before losing a return match against Colorado on August 28. He then returned to the bullpen for the remainder of the year, his last in the majors.

Throughout his MLB career Powell played in 48 games, with four starts. He never collected a big-league win and ended his career with a 0–5 win–loss record. In 531/3 innings pitched, he gave up 52 hits, 32 bases on balls, and 32 earned runs. He struck out 42. His professional baseball career lasted for eight seasons (1989–96).

Two decades after leaving baseball, Powell, 49, who had opened a lawn-care company, was found dead of carbon monoxide poisoning in his business's van in Lucas, Texas, a suburb of Dallas–Fort Worth. His 72-year-old father, Lyle, also perished in the October 25, 2017, incident.
