= 1952 Pittsburgh Pirates season =

1952 Pittsburgh Pirates
- League: National League
- Ballpark: Forbes Field
- City: Pittsburgh, Pennsylvania
- Owners: John W. Galbreath (majority shareholder); Bing Crosby, Thomas P. Johnson, Branch Rickey (minority shareholders)
- General managers: Branch Rickey
- Managers: Billy Meyer
- Radio: WWSW; Rosey Rowswell, Bob Prince

The 1952 Pittsburgh Pirates season was the team's 71st season in Major League Baseball, and their 66th season in the National League. The Pirates posted a record of 42 wins and 112 losses, their worst record since 1890, and one of the worst in major league history.

== Offseason ==
The Pirates were led in 1952 by 70-year-old general manager Branch Rickey and 60-year-old manager Billy Meyer. Meyer had led Pittsburgh to a last-place finish in the National League in 1950. After Rickey was installed as general manager, the Pirates were second-to-last in 1951. Tension was high as the two-year contract of their star slugger, Ralph Kiner, expired before the 1952 season. Kiner was the premier power hitter in baseball, having won the previous six National League home run titles. Rickey voiced what he viewed as inconsistent levels of commitment by Kiner when talking to the media. Kiner received permission to instead negotiate directly with owner John W. Galbreath and agreed to a reported one-year, $90,000 contract, making him the highest-paid player in the National League. Kiner was signed, but the most famous Pirate of all, 78-year-old Hall of Fame member Honus Wagner, decided to retire from his part-time coaching duties with the team. His number was retired, and he was given a lifetime pass to Forbes Field.

Rickey wanted to hold a tryout for dozens of kids from the low minor league levels, and his plan was largely supported by Bing Crosby and the rest of the team's ownership. Rickey hired his former scout and coach Clyde Sukeforth, who had scouted Jackie Robinson for Rickey in the 1940s. Several top young prospects, like Vern Law and Danny O'Connell, were called to military service for the Korean War, and the more experienced Danny Murtaugh retired to accept a minor league managing position. Expectations were high for 23-year-old outfielder Gus Bell to support Kiner in the lineup. Murry Dickson, who had won 21 games in 1951, nearly a third of the entire team's win total, was once again expected to be the anchor of the pitching rotation.

=== Notable transactions ===
- Before the 1952 season: Sonny Senerchia was signed as a free agent by the Pirates.

== Regular season ==
=== Season summary ===
==== A season to forget ====
The Pirates struggled throughout spring training in 1952. Gus Bell missed training time due to family-related car problems and illness and was sent to the minor leagues. Towards the end of spring training, pitcher Bill Werle was suspended indefinitely and fined $500, only the third player fined in over two decades of Billy Meyer's managing career. Werle professed his innocence and was reinstated before Opening Day but he was traded to the St. Louis Cardinals two weeks later.

Thirteen rookies made the Pirates' Opening Day roster, including four teenagers: Bobby Del Greco, Tony Bartirome, Jim Waugh and Lee Walls. After four games, Pittsburgh's record was 2–2 but they quickly tumbled to the bottom of the majors by losing 16 of their next 17 games. The early two-game winning streak matched the longest they would see all year. Their top three pitchers combined to win just one of their first nine games started. Kiner's hitting was affected by the lack of support as well as back problems and his batting average was under .220 several weeks into the season. Kiner's difficulties and a club-earned run average over five resulted in a 5–28 record in mid-May. Gus Bell returned from the minors on May 12 and hit for some power but Kiner hit only .241 with 13 home runs and 31 RBIs in the first half which ended with Pittsburgh at 21–59. 21-year-old Dick Groat was one of the Pirates' few bright spots in the first half with four hits in his first three games, but others went into long slumps like Jack Merson's 0-for-35, Clyde McCullough's 0-for-24 and Tony Bartirome's 0-for-29.

The second half soon resembled the first with a 2–11 stretch in mid-July. They were mathematically eliminated from pennant contention on August 6 with more than six weeks left to play. In early August, Pittsburgh called up 20-year-old pitcher Ron Necciai from the minors. Necciai had pitched a legendary 27-strikeout game in the minors but gave up five runs in his first inning in the majors. Necciai not only finished the season with poor numbers but also injured his arm and never again pitched in the majors. Branch Rickey's youth movement, derided as "Operation Peach Fuzz", continued unabated. On August 20, the average age of Pittsburgh's starting lineup was only 23 with Kiner and Garagiola being the only non-rookies. On September 5, pitcher Bill Bell made his major league debut at age 18. Including Bell, seven of the eight youngest players in the National League in 1952 were Pittsburgh Pirates. The "Rickey Dinks", as they were sometimes called, were not only young but small. In one game, the entire infield was less than six feet tall.

The Pirate's difficulties reached off the field as well. Ralph Kiner, enduring his worst season to date, received a death threat in an attempt to extort $6,200. Rather than pay, he contacted the authorities and was kept under guard for a time. Financially, Pittsburgh's attendance was the lowest since World War II, falling more than 30% short of the one million budgeted. Branch Rickey sometimes saved money by sending only 21 players on road trips. The final losses for the franchise, including minor leagues and bonuses, were $800,000.

Billy Meyer resigned as manager on September 27, the second-to-last day of the season.

==== Final results ====
When the season mercifully ended, Pittsburgh's final record was 42–112. The winning percentage and number of losses were the worst for the franchise since the 1890 season (which was greatly affected by the inclusion of the Players' League) and the worst for any franchise since the 1935 Boston Braves. Since 1952, the only non-expansion team to finish worse has been the 2003 Detroit Tigers.

A few individuals came away with positive notes. A late-season home run surge by Ralph Kiner brought him his seventh consecutive home run championship (he finished tied with Hank Sauer with 37 on the year). It was also his last. Dick Groat finished at .284 and was third in National League Rookie of the Year voting. Joe Garagiola logged the most playing time of his career and hit .273 with a career-high 54 RBIs, third most on the team behind only Kiner and Gus Bell.

On the flip side, teenagers Tony Bartirome and Bobby Del Greco were regulars but neither hit over .220. Seven other players had at least 40 at-bats but hit under .200. Kiner's home run total (37) was more than the next four highest on the team combined (16, 8, 7, 5). As a team, Pittsburgh was last in the National League in runs, hits, doubles, triples, home runs, RBIs, batting average, slugging percentage, complete games, ERA, walks allowed, home runs allowed, fielding percentage and errors committed. Murry Dickson, who won 21 games in 1951, lost 20 games in 1952, going 14–20. Only three other pitchers won more than two games. The pitching staff walked 615 opposing batters while striking out only 564, with 16 different players starting a game during the season.

Among their young players, only Jim Waugh – the youngest – played in the majors again before 1955. Waugh played in 1953, his last year; Ron Necciai and Tony Bartirome never played in the majors after 1952; Bill Bell pitched one inning in 1955, his last; and Bobby Del Greco, Lee Walls and Ron Kline had longer careers but not until several years later. Dick Groat and pitcher Bob Friend were the only players to endure the 1952 season who also played with the 1960 World Series champion Pirates.

==== Anecdotes, etc. ====
The failure of the 1952 Pirates was the source of several anecdotes and side stories. Pittsburgh Press writer Les Biederman recalled an earlier humorous practice by giving Dick Groat a dime while he was in an 0-for-19 slump. When Groat broke out of the slump with a 5-for-5 game, Biederman gave Kiner a quarter with similar positive results so Biederman continued giving coins to various Pirates. Joe Garagiola, the regular catcher for the 1952 Pirates, frequently used the team's struggles in his later career as a baseball sportscaster with lines like, "They talk about Pearl Harbor being something; they should have seen the 1952 Pittsburgh Pirates" and "In an eight-team league, we should've finished ninth."

=== Season standings ===
National League
Team	W	L	Pct.	GB	Home	Road
Brooklyn Dodgers	96	57	.627	—	45‍–‍33	51‍–‍24
New York Giants	92	62	.597	4½	50‍–‍27	42‍–‍35
St. Louis Cardinals	88	66	.571	8½	48‍–‍29	40‍–‍37
Philadelphia Phillies	87	67	.565	9½	47‍–‍29	40‍–‍38
Chicago Cubs	77	77	.500	19½	42‍–‍35	35‍–‍42
Cincinnati Reds	69	85	.448	27½	38‍–‍39	31‍–‍46
Boston Braves	64	89	.418	32	31‍–‍45	33‍–‍44
Pittsburgh Pirates	42	112	.273	54½	23‍–‍54	19‍–‍58

=== Record vs. opponents ===
1952 National League record Sources:
Team	BSN	BRO	CHC	CIN	NYG	PHI	PIT	STL
Boston	—	3–18–1	12–10	9–13	9–13	9–13	15–7–1	7–15
Brooklyn	18–3–1	—	13–9–1	17–5	8–14	10–12	19–3	11–11
Chicago	10–12	9–13–1	—	13–9	10–12	10–12	14–8	11–11
Cincinnati	13–9	5–17	9–13	—	6–16	10–12	16–6	10–12
New York	13–9	14–8	12–10	16–6	—	10–12	15–7	12–10
Philadelphia	13–9	12–10	12–10	12–10	12–10	—	16–6	10–12
Pittsburgh	7–15–1	3–19	8–14	6–16	7–15	6–16	—	5–17
St. Louis	15–7	11–11	11–11	12–10	10–12	12–10	17–5	—

=== Game log ===
1952 Game Log: 42–112 (Home: 23–54; Away: 19–58)
April: 3–12 (Home: 2–7; Away: 1–5)

#	Date	Opponent	Score	Win	Loss	Save	Attendance	Record
1	April 15	@ Cardinals	2–3	Staley	**Dickson** (0–1)	Brazle	15,850	0–1
2	April 16	@ Cardinals	5–6	Chambers	**Pollet** (0–1)	Brazle	4,324	0–2
3	April 17	@ Cardinals	5–3	**Muir** (1–0)	Yuhas	**Wilks** (1)	4,907	1–2
4	April 18	Reds	3–0	**Friend** (1–0)	Blackwell	—	29,874	2–2
5	April 19	Reds	3–9	Wehmeier	**Queen** (0–1)	—	10,271	2–3
6	April 20	Reds	6–8	Perkowski	**Dickson** (0–2)	Byerly		2–4
7	April 20	Reds	2–12	Hiller	**Pollet** (0–2)	—	23,732	2–5
8	April 21	Cubs	1–7	Minner	**Kline** (0–1)	—	12,378	2–6
9	April 22	Cubs	2–13	Rush	**Friend** (1–1)	—	9,321	2–7
10	April 25	Cardinals	4–6	Staley	**Muir** (1–1)	Brazle	1,945	2–8
11	April 26	@ Reds	2–9	Wehmeier	**Dickson** (0–3)	Smith	4,239	2–9
12	April 27	@ Reds	2–8	Raffensberger	**Friend** (1–2)	—		2–10
13	April 27	@ Reds	0–1	Hiller	**Pollet** (0–3)	—	16,427	2–11
14	April 29	Braves	1–5	Spahn	**Friend** (1–3)	—	10,008	2–12
15	April 30	Braves	11–5	**Dickson** (1–3)	Cole	**Wilks** (2)	2,861	3–12

May: 7–21 (Home: 6–11; Away: 1–10)

#	Date	Opponent	Score	Win	Loss	Save	Attendance	Record
16	May 1	Giants	5–13	Hearn	**Queen** (0–2)	—	4,801	3–13
17	May 2	Giants	3–5 (10)	Wilhelm	**Wilks** (0–1)	Spencer	17,111	3–14
18	May 3	Giants	2–3	Maglie	**Kline** (0–2)	—	7,451	3–15
19	May 4	Dodgers	0–6	Erskine	**Dickson** (1–4)	—	19,322	3–16
20	May 5	Dodgers	1–5 (8)	Branca	**Friend** (1–4)	—	3,652	3–17
21	May 6	Phillies	0–6	Roberts	**Carlsen** (0–1)	—	9,008	3–18
22	May 7	Phillies	5–1	**Pollet** (1–3)	Meyer	—	7,291	4–18
23	May 10	@ Cubs	1–3	Rush	**Dickson** (1–5)	—	7,438	4–19
24	May 11	@ Cubs	2–8	Minner	**Kline** (0–3)	—		4–20
25	May 11	@ Cubs	11–2	**Friend** (2–4)	Klippstein	—	14,845	5–20
26	May 13	@ Braves	1–3	Bickford	**Pollet** (1–4)	—	2,831	5–21
27	May 14	@ Braves	3–4 (10)	Surkont	**Main** (0–1)	—	1,105	5–22
28	May 15	@ Dodgers	0–2	Loes	**Dickson** (1–6)	—	14,402	5–23
29	May 16	@ Dodgers	4–6	Labine	**Main** (0–2)	—	3,385	5–24
30	May 17	@ Dodgers	7–12	Wade	**Kline** (0–4)	—	11,067	5–25
31	May 19	@ Giants	0–4	Maglie	**Pollet** (1–5)	—	4,461	5–26
32	May 21	@ Phillies	3–7	Roberts	**Dickson** (1–7)	—	6,202	5–27
33	May 22	@ Phillies	0–6	Simmons	**Munger** (0–1)	—	3,065	5–28
34	May 23	Cubs	6–5 (13)	**Wilks** (1–1)	Hacker	—	8,496	6–28
35	May 24	Cubs	5–7	Minner	**Pollet** (1–6)	Klippstein	3,118	6–29
36	May 25	Cubs	4–5	Hacker	**Wilks** (1–2)	Leonard	5,111	6–30
37	May 26	Reds	6–3	**Friend** (3–4)	Hiller	—	6,171	7–30
38	May 27	Reds	4–5 (14)	Smith	**Main** (0–3)	—	2,150	7–31
39	May 28	Reds	2–5	Raffensberger	**Munger** (0–2)	—	6,186	7–32
40	May 29	Reds	4–2	**Dickson** (2–7)	Perkowski	—	1,070	8–32
41	May 30	Cardinals	2–3	Yuhas	**Friend** (3–5)	Brazle		8–33
42	May 30	Cardinals	4–3	**LaPalme** (1–0)	Staley	—	19,546	9–33
43	May 31	Phillies	5–3	**Muir** (2–1)	Possehl	**Main** (1)	6,425	10–33

June: 8–20 (Home: 5–10; Away: 3–10)

#	Date	Opponent	Score	Win	Loss	Save	Attendance	Record
44	June 1	Phillies	1–5	Simmons	**Dickson** (2–8)	—		10–34
45	June 1	Phillies	2–1	**Wilks** (2–2)	Drews	—	15,529	11–34
46	June 3	Dodgers	4–6	Branca	**Munger** (0–3)	Rutherford	19,452	11–35
47	June 4	Dodgers	4–7	Erskine	**Friend** (3–6)	Loes	14,421	11–36
48	June 5	Dodgers	0–2	Wade	**Main** (0–4)	—	6,328	11–37
49	June 6	Giants	8–1	**Dickson** (3–8)	Maglie	—	20,163	12–37
50	June 7	Giants	5–7	Spencer	**Main** (0–5)	Lanier	7,656	12–38
51	June 8	Giants	1–9	Jansen	**Pollet** (1–7)	—	13,942	12–39
52	June 9	Braves	2–3	Wilson	**Friend** (3–7)	—	6,973	12–40
53	June 10	Braves	7–5	**Wilks** (3–2)	Spahn	—	10,934	13–40
54	June 11	Braves	5–0	**Dickson** (4–8)	Surkont	—	9,415	14–40
55	June 12	Braves	2–11	Burdette	**Muir** (2–2)	—	3,223	14–41
56	June 14	@ Phillies	2–4	Meyer	**Friend** (3–8)	Konstanty	5,033	14–42
57	June 15	@ Phillies	6–0	**Pollet** (2–7)	Drews	—		15–42
58	June 15	@ Phillies	3–6	Fox	**Dickson** (4–9)	Konstanty	12,525	15–43
59	June 16	@ Phillies	4–5	Konstanty	**LaPalme** (1–1)	—	2,210	15–44
60	June 17	@ Giants	6–2	**Main** (1–5)	Gregg	—	11,317	16–44
61	June 18	@ Giants	2–5	Hearn	**Friend** (3–9)	—	3,346	16–45
62	June 19	@ Giants	8–1	**Dickson** (5–9)	Jansen	—	6,369	17–45
63	June 20	@ Dodgers	4–5	Labine	**Wilks** (3–3)	—	4,679	17–46
64	June 21	@ Dodgers	4–14	Loes	**Main** (1–6)	Erskine	13,335	17–47
65	June 23	@ Braves	3–9	Johnson	**Friend** (3–10)	—	2,654	17–48
66	June 24	@ Braves	3–4	Wilson	**Dickson** (5–10)	—	3,736	17–49
67	June 25	@ Braves	2–5	Surkont	**Pollet** (2–8)	—	1,414	17–50
68	June 27	Cardinals	4–6	Yuhas	**Muir** (2–3)	Brazle	16,133	17–51
69	June 28	Cardinals	3–4	Yuhas	**Dickson** (5–11)	—	5,417	17–52
70	June 29	Cardinals	2–1 (5)	**Pollet** (3–8)	Boyer	—	14,870	18–52
71	June 30	@ Cubs	4–5	Klippstein	**Friend** (3–11)	—	5,983	18–53

July: 10–21 (Home: 4–8; Away: 6–13)

#	Date	Opponent	Score	Win	Loss	Save	Attendance	Record
72	July 1	@ Cubs	3–2	**Main** (2–6)	Ramsdell	**Wilks** (3)	9,935	19–53
73	July 2	@ Cubs	3–8	Minner	**Dickson** (5–12)	—		19–54
74	July 2	@ Cubs	0–3 (8)	Hacker	**Kline** (0–5)	—	16,543	19–55
75	July 3	@ Reds	1–5	Church	**Pollet** (3–9)	—	1,807	19–56
76	July 4	@ Reds	4–2	**Friend** (4–11)	Perkowski	—		20–56
77	July 4	@ Reds	5–2	**Fisher** (1–0)	Nuxhall	**Wilks** (4)	8,253	21–56
78	July 5	@ Cardinals	0–5	Brazle	**Main** (2–7)	—	15,625	21–57
79	July 6	@ Cardinals	5–6	Yuhas	**Dickson** (5–13)	—		21–58
80	July 6	@ Cardinals	4–6	Brecheen	**Friend** (4–12)	—	17,048	21–59
81	July 10	Giants	6–4 (12)	**Wilks** (4–3)	Spencer	—	15,226	22–59
82	July 11	Giants	6–2	**Dickson** (6–13)	Maglie	—	4,482	23–59
83	July 12	Braves	2–5	Bickford	**Friend** (4–13)	—	4,999	23–60
84	July 13	Braves	2–4	Surkont	**Fisher** (1–1)	—		23–61
85	July 13	Braves	1–2	Jester	**Wilks** (4–4)	—	12,373	23–62
86	July 15	Phillies	3–10	Simmons	**Pollet** (3–10)	—	10,244	23–63
87	July 16	Phillies	7–8	Roberts	**Dickson** (6–14)	Hansen	2,569	23–64
88	July 17	Phillies	2–1	**Hogue** (1–0)	Meyer	—		24–64
89	July 17	Phillies	4–2	**Wilks** (5–4)	Drews	—	5,304	25–64
90	July 18	Dodgers	2–6	Loes	**Friend** (4–14)	Black	19,681	25–65
91	July 19	Dodgers	1–9	Erskine	**Pollet** (3–11)	—	5,662	25–66
92	July 20	Dodgers	5–8	Wade	**Dickson** (6–15)	Black	14,490	25–67
93	July 22	@ Phillies	4–14	Meyer	**Hogue** (1–1)	—		25–68
94	July 22	@ Phillies	1–8	Drews	**Main** (2–8)	Hansen	11,213	25–69
95	July 23	@ Phillies	1–4	Ridzik	**Friend** (4–15)	Roberts	4,611	25–70
96	July 25	@ Braves	3–2	**Dickson** (7–15)	Spahn	—	4,126	26–70
97	July 26	@ Braves	6–4	**Pollet** (4–11)	Jester	—	2,006	27–70
98	July 27	@ Braves	2–5	Bickford	**Hogue** (1–2)	Burdette		27–71
99	July 27	@ Braves	3–3 (11)			—	3,719	27–71
100	July 29	@ Dodgers	7–1	**Dickson** (8–15)	Loes	—	11,807	28–71
101	July 30	@ Dodgers	3–4 (10)	Black	**Friend** (4–16)	—	5,110	28–72
102	July 31	@ Dodgers	6–7 (11)	Black	**LaPalme** (1–2)	—		28–73
103	July 31	@ Dodgers	1–4	Landrum	**Main** (2–9)	—		28–74

August: 10–20 (Home: 5–15; Away: 5–5)

#	Date	Opponent	Score	Win	Loss	Save	Attendance	Record
104	August 1	@ Giants	3–7	Hearn	**Fisher** (1–2)	—	10,458	28–75
105	August 2	@ Giants	3–4 (6)	Wilhelm	**Dickson** (8–16)	—	4,174	28–76
106	August 3	@ Giants	7–0	**Dickson** (9–16)	Lanier	—		29–76
107	August 3	@ Giants	10–8 (6)	**Pollet** (5–11)	Jansen	**Main** (2)	17,965	30–76
108	August 5	Cardinals	3–4 (12)	Presko	**Hogue** (1–3)	—	10,235	30–77
109	August 6	Cardinals	2–7 (10)	Brazle	**Wilks** (5–5)	—		30–78
110	August 6	Cardinals	2–3	Boyer	**Main** (2–10)	Yuhas	11,999	30–79
111	August 8	Cubs	1–0 (10)	**Dickson** (10–16)	Rush	—	8,503	31–79
112	August 9	Cubs	4–3	**Waugh** (1–0)	Kelly	—	4,196	32–79
113	August 10	Cubs	5–9	Hacker	**Necciai** (0–1)	Leonard		32–80
114	August 10	Cubs	3–4	Minner	**Pollet** (5–12)	Leonard	17,773	32–81
115	August 11	Reds	4–10	Wehmeier	**Hogue** (1–4)	Smith	9,304	32–82
116	August 14	@ Cardinals	5–3 (10)	**Dickson** (11–16)	Presko	—	9,524	33–82
117	August 15	@ Cardinals	4–5	Brazle	**Main** (2–11)	—	6,115	33–83
118	August 16	@ Cubs	2–1	**Pollet** (6–12)	Minner	—	12,256	34–83
119	August 17	@ Cubs	2–5	Rush	**Waugh** (1–1)	—		34–84
120	August 17	@ Cubs	5–2	**Friend** (5–16)	Kelly	—	26,635	35–84
121	August 18	@ Cubs	3–4	Schultz	**Dickson** (11–17)	—	4,911	35–85
122	August 19	Phillies	5–10	Roberts	**Necciai** (0–2)	—	11,207	35–86
123	August 20	Phillies	1–3	Meyer	**Hogue** (1–5)	—	2,755	35–87
124	August 22	Dodgers	2–9	Black	**Pollet** (6–13)	—		35–88
125	August 22	Dodgers	3–2	**Dickson** (12–17)	Landrum	—	21,845	36–88
126	August 23	Dodgers	2–3	Labine	**Waugh** (1–2)	Black	8,844	36–89
127	August 24	Braves	4–3	**Necciai** (1–2)	Jester	**Dickson** (1)		37–89
128	August 24	Braves	3–5 (10)	Burdette	**Kline** (0–6)	—	12,349	37–90
129	August 26	Giants	7–14	Wilhelm	**Dickson** (12–18)	Lanier	14,011	37–91
130	August 27	Giants	4–5	Connelly	**Pollet** (6–14)	Jansen	4,069	37–92
131	August 28	Giants	7–14	Koslo	**Waugh** (1–3)	—	3,561	37–93
132	August 30	Cardinals	2–12	Staley	**Necciai** (1–3)	—	10,500	37–94
133	August 31	Cardinals	4–2	**Dickson** (13–18)	Miller	—	7,871	38–94

September: 4–18 (Home: 1–3; Away: 3–15)

#	Date	Opponent	Score	Win	Loss	Save	Attendance	Record
134	September 1	Cubs	0–6	Klippstein	**Pollet** (6–15)	—		38–95
135	September 1	Cubs	5–4 (11)	**Dickson** (14–18)	Leonard	—	13,031	39–95
136	September 3	@ Reds	0–1	Raffensberger	**Necciai** (1–4)	—	4,230	39–96
137	September 4	@ Reds	2–7	Wehmeier	**Waugh** (1–4)	—	1,519	39–97
138	September 5	@ Cardinals	0–4	Mizell	**Bell** (0–1)	—	4,327	39–98
139	September 6	@ Cardinals	4–7 (10)	Brazle	**Dickson** (14–19)	—	7,329	39–99
140	September 7	@ Cardinals	3–4	Brazle	**Waugh** (1–5)	—	9,298	39–100
141	September 9	@ Giants	6–11	Connelly	**Hogue** (1–6)	Spencer	2,894	39–101
142	September 10	@ Giants	2–3 (13)	Wilhelm	**Dickson** (14–20)	—	3,742	39–102
143	September 11	@ Giants	4–5	Maglie	**Pollet** (6–16)	Wilhelm	3,094	39–103
144	September 12	@ Braves	8–1	**Friend** (6–16)	Jester	—		40–103
145	September 12	@ Braves	0–16	Johnson	**Necciai** (1–5)	—	2,608	40–104
146	September 13	@ Braves	0–8	Spahn	**Kline** (0–7)	—	1,957	40–105
147	September 14	@ Phillies	2–5	Simmons	**Hogue** (1–7)	—		40–106
148	September 14	@ Phillies	1–2	Meyer	**Waugh** (1–6)	—	7,238	40–107
149	September 16	@ Dodgers	2–4	Hughes	**Dickson** (14–21)	Black	13,422	40–108
150	September 17	@ Dodgers	4–1	**Pollet** (7–16)	Wade	**Dickson** (2)	5,895	41–108
151	September 19	Reds	3–4	Wehmeier	**Friend** (6–17)	—	5,435	41–109
152	September 21	Reds	3–4	Podbielan	**Necciai** (1–6)	—	22,398	41–110
153	September 26	@ Reds	0–5	Podbielan	**Hogue** (1–8)	—	3,893	41–111
154	September 27	@ Reds	9–6	**Friend** (7–17)	Perkowski	—	2,084	42–111
155	September 28	@ Reds	2–3	Raffensberger	**Main** (2–12)	—	7,354	42–112

Legend: = Win = Loss = Tie
Bold = Pirates team member

=== Opening Day lineup ===
Opening Day Starters
**April 15, 1952 @St. Louis**
Position	Player
P	Murry Dickson
C	Clyde McCullough
1B	Catfish Metkovich
2B	Jack Merson
3B	Dick Hall
SS	Clem Koshorek
LF	Ralph Kiner
CF	Ted Beard
RF	Gus Bell

=== Notable transactions ===
- May 17, 1952: Bill Howerton was selected off waivers from the Pirates by the New York Giants.
- June 16, 1952: Dick Groat was signed as an amateur free agent by the Pirates.

=== Roster ===
1952 Pittsburgh Pirates
**Roster**
**Pitchers**: 30 Bill Bell; 24 Don Carlsen; 22 Murry Dickson; 29 Jim Dunn; 19 Harry Fisher; 25 Bob Friend; 36 Cal Hogue; 20 Ron Kline; 32 Paul LaPalme; 35 Woody Main; 30 Joe Muir; 19 Red Munger; 21 Ron Necciai; 11 Howie Pollet; 36 Mel Queen; 27 Jim Suchecki; 23 Jim Waugh; 19 Bill Werle; 28 Ted Wilks; 34 Ed Wolfe	**Catchers**: 9 Ed Fitz Gerald; 2 Joe Garagiola; 29 Jim Mangan; 3 Clyde McCullough; **Infielders**: 5 Tony Bartirome; 12 Johnny Berardino; 16 Pete Castiglione; 24 Dick Groat; 26 Clem Koshorek; 10 Jack Merson; 44 Catfish Metkovich; 5 Jack Phillips; 14 Sonny Senerchia; 6,31 Dick Smith; 14 George Strickland	**Outfielders**: 21 Ted Beard; 7 Gus Bell; 17 Brandy Davis; 8 Bobby Del Greco; 15 Erv Dusak; 18 Dick Hall; 8 Bill Howerton; 4 Ralph Kiner; 15 Frank Thomas; 6 Lee Walls	**Manager**: 1 Billy Meyer; **Coaches**: 43 Sam Narron; 42 Bill Posedel; 40 Milt Stock; 41 Clyde Sukeforth

== Player stats ==
=== Batting ===
==== Starters by position ====
Note: Pos = Position; G = Games played; AB = At bats; H = Hits; Avg. = Batting average; HR = Home runs; RBI = Runs batted in

Pos	Player	G	AB	H	Avg.	HR	RBI
C	Joe Garagiola	118	344	94	.273	8	54
1B	Tony Bartirome	124	355	78	.220	0	16
2B	Jack Merson	111	398	98	.246	5	38
3B	Pete Castiglione	67	214	57	.266	4	18
SS	Dick Groat	95	384	109	.284	1	29
OF	Ralph Kiner	149	516	126	.244	37	87
OF	Gus Bell	131	468	117	.250	16	59
OF	Bobby Del Greco	99	341	74	.217	1	20

==== Other batters ====
Note: G = Games played; AB = At bats; H = Hits; Avg. = Batting average; HR = Home runs; RBI = Runs batted in

Player	G	AB	H	Avg.	HR	RBI
Catfish Metkovich	125	373	101	.271	7	41
Clem Koshorek	98	322	84	.261	0	15
George Strickland	76	232	41	.177	5	22
Clyde McCullough	66	172	40	.233	1	15
Sonny Senerchia	29	100	22	.220	3	11
Brandy Davis	55	95	17	.179	0	1
Dick Hall	26	80	11	.138	0	2
Lee Walls	32	80	15	.188	2	5
Ed Fitz Gerald	51	73	17	.233	1	7
Dick Smith	29	66	7	.106	0	5
Johnny Berardino	19	56	8	.143	0	4
Ted Beard	15	44	8	.182	0	3
Erv Dusak	20	27	6	.222	1	3
Bill Howerton	13	25	8	.320	0	4
Frank Thomas	6	21	2	.095	0	0
Jim Mangan	11	13	2	.154	0	2
Jack Phillips	1	1	0	.000	0	0

=== Pitching ===
==== Starting pitchers ====
Note: G = Games pitched; IP = Innings pitched; W = Wins; L = Losses; ERA = Earned run average; SO = Strikeouts

Player	G	IP	W	L	ERA	SO
Murry Dickson	43	277.2	14	21	3.57	112
Howie Pollet	31	214.0	7	16	4.12	90
Ron Necciai	12	54.2	1	6	7.08	31
Red Munger	5	26.1	0	3	7.18	8
Mel Queen	2	3.1	0	2	29.70	3

==== Other pitchers ====
Note: G = Games pitched; IP = Innings pitched; W = Wins; L = Losses; ERA = Earned run average; SO = Strikeouts

Player	G	IP	W	L	ERA	SO
Bob Friend	35	185.0	7	17	4.18	75
Woody Main	48	153.1	2	12	4.46	79
Cal Hogue	19	83.2	1	8	4.84	34
Ron Kline	27	78.2	0	7	5.49	27
Jim Waugh	17	52.1	1	6	6.36	18
Joe Muir	12	35.2	2	3	6.31	17
Harry Fisher	8	18.1	1	2	6.87	5
Bill Bell	4	15.2	0	1	4.60	4
Don Carlsen	5	10.0	0	1	10.80	2

==== Relief pitchers ====
Note: G = Games pitched; W = Wins; L = Losses; SV = Saves; ERA = Earned run average; SO = Strikeouts

Player	G	W	L	SV	ERA	SO
Ted Wilks	44	5	5	4	3.61	24
Paul LaPalme	31	1	2	0	3.92	25
Jim Suchecki	5	0	0	0	5.40	6
Jim Dunn	3	0	0	0	3.38	2
Bill Werle	5	0	0	0	9.00	1
Ed Wolfe	3	0	0	0	7.36	1

== Farm system ==
Level	Team	League	Manager
Open	Hollywood Stars	Pacific Coast League	Fred Haney
AA	New Orleans Pelicans	Southern Association	Danny Murtaugh
A	Charleston Rebels	Sally League	Frank Oceak
A	Denver Bears	Western League	Andy Cohen
B	Waco Pirates	Big State League	Tedd Gullic
B	Burlington-Graham Pirates	Carolina League	Jerry Gardner
C	Modesto Reds	California League	Buck Elliott and Clint Cameron
C	Billings Mustangs	Pioneer League	Cliff Dapper
C	St. Jean Canadiens	Provincial League	Gordon Maltzberger
C	Hutchinson Elks	Western Association	Wes Griffin
D	Bristol Twins	Appalachian League	George Detore
D	Brunswick Pirates	Georgia–Florida League	Mickey O'Neil
D	Bartlesville/Pittsburg Pirates	Kansas–Oklahoma–Missouri League	Hersh Martin and Ed Hayes
D	Mayfield Clothiers	KITTY League	Frank Barrett
D	Batavia Clippers	PONY League	George Genovese

LEAGUE CHAMPIONS: Hollywood, Denver
Bartlesville franchise transferred to Pittsburg (Kansas), on July 7, 1952

== See also ==
- List of worst Major League Baseball season records
