= Harry Dunlop =

American baseball player and coach (1933–2022)

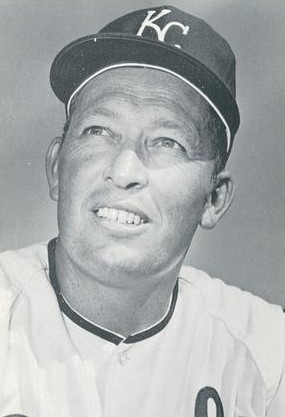
- Coach
- Born: September 6, 1933 (age 92); Sacramento, California, U.S.
- Died: November 16, 2022; Sacramento, California, U.S.
- Batted: Left Threw: Right
- Stats at Baseball Reference

Teams
- Kansas City Royals (1969–1975); Chicago Cubs (1976); Cincinnati Reds (1979–1982); San Diego Padres (1983–1987); Cincinnati Reds (1998–2000); Florida Marlins (2005)

Harry Alexander Dunlop (September 6, 1933 - November 16, 2022) was an American catcher, coach and manager in professional baseball. As a player, Dunlop never reached Major League Baseball—he spent his early career as a catcher and pilot in the minor leagues—but he spent 21 seasons in the big leagues as a coach during the period between 1969 and 2005.

== Catcher for Necciai's 27-strikeout game ==
Dunlop batted left-handed, threw right-handed, stood 6 ft 3 in (191 cm) tall and weighed 200 pounds (91 kg). He played in the farm system of the Pittsburgh Pirates from 1952 through 1957—missing the 1953–54 seasons due to military service—but his most famous achievement came during his 16-game stint with his first team, the Bristol Twins of the Class D Appalachian League. Between May 13 and May 26, 1952, Dunlop caught three no-hitters from Bristol pitchers, one from Ron Necciai in which Necciai struck out a record 27 batters in a nine-inning game, and two no-hitters from teammate Bill Bell.

The Necciai game is regarded as one of the most outstanding achievements in baseball history. While he recorded 27 strikeouts and one ground ball out, Necciai had to garner 28 outs in the game because of a passed ball by Dunlop on a strikeout in the ninth inning. "That was the first of three no-hitters I caught in 14 days", Dunlop said 35 years later. "But it was the only professional game anyone ever caught in which a pitcher struck out 27 batters in nine innings. I felt like a celebrity after it. I told [manager] George Detore, I said, 'George, I called a helluva game, didn't I?' You know what? George just looked at me and said, 'Why'd you call that pitch to so-and-so in the sixth?'"

== Minor league manager ==
Dunlop's celebrity was short-lived. His playing career stalled in 1956 with the New Orleans Pelicans of the Class AA Southern Association and he was released by the Pirates the following season. He kept his baseball career going, however, as the playing manager of the unaffiliated Tucson Cowboys of the Class C Arizona–Mexico League. The Cowboys finished second in the league in 1958, and Dunlop batted .349.

By 1961, Dunlop had joined the minor league managerial staff of the Baltimore Orioles, with the Stockton Ports of the Class C California League. He managed at the Class A level for the Orioles and the California Angels through the middle of 1968, briefly coached for the AAA Seattle Angels, and then was named a coach in 1969 for the first-year Kansas City Royals expansion franchise in the American League.

== Major League coach ==
He spent seven seasons (1969–75) as a coach with Kansas City, then served on the staffs of the Chicago Cubs (1976), Cincinnati Reds (1979–82), and San Diego Padres (1983–87).

During his Kansas City tenure, he worked for 2½ years (1973 through mid-1975) under Royals manager Jack McKeon, like Dunlop a former minor league catcher in the Pirates' organization, and the two formed a strong professional association. McKeon was the general manager of the Padres when Dunlop coached for San Diego; he then moved Dunlop into the Padre farm system as field coordinator of minor league instruction (1988–90). McKeon also named Dunlop to his coaching staff in his late-career managerial assignments with the Reds (1998–2000) and Florida Marlins, for whom Dunlop served as a coach in 2005 when he was 71 years of age, and McKeon, his boss, was 74.

He recently wrote a book 50 Years in a Kid's Game. Dunlop died on November 16, 2022, at the age of 89.

Sporting positions
Preceded by Bill Rigney	Tucson Cowboys manager 1958	Succeeded by Ernest Choukalos
Preceded by Billy DeMars	Stockton Ports manager 1961–1964	Succeeded by Harry Malmberg
Preceded by Chuck Tanner	Quad Cities Angels manager 1965	Succeeded by Ken Blackman
Preceded by Ken Blackman	Quad Cities Angels manager 1965–1966	Succeeded by Fred Koenig
Preceded by Rocky Bridges	San Jose Bees manager 1967–1968	Succeeded by Del Rice
Preceded by Irv Noren	Chicago Cubs third base coach 1976	Succeeded by Peanuts Lowrey
Preceded by Doc Edwards	Wichita Aeros manager 1977–1978	Succeeded by Jack Hiatt
Preceded by George Scherger	Cincinnati Reds bench coach 1979–1982	Succeeded by George Scherger
Preceded by first manager	Las Vegas Stars manager 1983	Succeeded by Bob Cluck
Preceded by Clyde McCullough	San Diego Padres bullpen coach 1983–1985	Succeeded by
Preceded by	San Diego Padres bench coach 1986	Succeeded by Greg Riddich
Preceded by Ozzie Virgil Sr.	San Diego Padres third base coach 1987	Succeeded by Sandy Alomar Sr.
Preceded by Gary Calhoun	Helena Brewers manager 1991–1992	Succeeded by Mike Epstein
Preceded by Mike Epstein	Helena Brewers manager 1993	Succeeded by Dub Kilgo
Preceded by Joel Youngblood	Cincinnati Reds third base coach 1998–1999	Succeeded by Ron Oester
Preceded by Doug Davis	Florida Marlins bench coach 2005	Succeeded by Gary Tuck
