= Sonny Senerchia =

American baseball player (1931–2003)

- Third baseman
- Born: April 6, 1931; Newark, New Jersey, U.S.
- Died: November 1, 2003 (aged 72); Freehold Township, New Jersey, U.S.
- Batted: Right Threw: Right

MLB debut
- April 22, 1952, for the Pittsburgh Pirates

Last MLB appearance
- September 28, 1952, for the Pittsburgh Pirates

MLB statistics
- Batting average: .220
- Home runs: 3
- Runs batted in: 11
- Stats at Baseball Reference

Teams
- Pittsburgh Pirates (1952)

Emanuel Robert "Sonny" Senerchia (April 6, 1931 – November 1, 2003) was an American professional baseball player who appeared in 29 games of Major League Baseball with the 1952 Pittsburgh Pirates and later became a professional musician as well as a teacher and college baseball coach.

He was born and brought up in Newark, New Jersey, and attended Montclair State University, where he earned bachelor's degrees in physical education and English; he then received a master's degree in music from Trenton State College. According to his obituary, Senerchia was an accomplished violinist as a boy, appearing at Carnegie Hall at the age of ten, and as an adult he was a concert violinist with the New Jersey Symphony, the Garden State Arts Center Orchestra, and the Toms River Symphony. He also performed as a violinist with Pearl Bailey, Jack Benny and others. As a jazz musician, he played clarinet, saxophone, flute and piano in ensembles and big bands.

Senerchia's professional baseball career lasted for eight seasons (1949; 1952–58). He threw and batted right-handed, stood 6 feet 1 inch (1.85 m) tall and weighed 195 pounds (88 kg). Mostly a third baseman early in his career, he later converted to pitcher as a minor leaguer.

However, he appeared in the Major Leagues almost exclusively as a third baseman, starting 26 games at the position for the last place Pirates during the final six weeks of the 1952 season, in which they lost 112 out of the 154 games they played. Although he would collect only 22 hits in an even 100 at bats, Senerchia had some shining moments. On August 24 at Forbes Field, he had three hits in four at bats, including his first Major League home run (off future TV broadcaster Ernie Johnson), which proved to be decisive in a 4–3 victory over the Boston Braves. He hit his final MLB homer off future Baseball Hall of Famer Hoyt Wilhelm of the New York Giants on September 11.

After his playing days ended, Senerchia became a teacher and head baseball coach of Monmouth University, as well as a professional musician. He was a Phys. Ed. and Drivers Ed. teacher at Christian Brothers Academy High School in Lincroft for several years in the mid 70s. He also was a race car driver and private pilot, and appeared on local TV and radio as a sports personality, living in Long Branch, Ocean Township and Spring Lake, where he resided for 20 years. He died from injuries suffered in a motorcycle accident in Freehold Township, New Jersey, at age 72.
