= Clem Koshorek =

American baseball player (1925–1991)

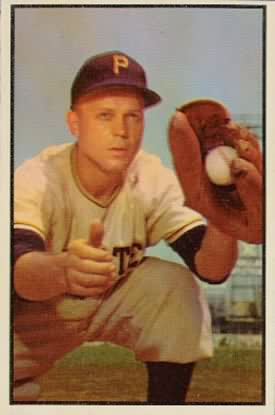
- Infielder
- Born: June 20, 1925; Royal Oak, Michigan, U.S.
- Died: September 8, 1991 (aged 66); Royal Oak, Michigan, U.S.
- Batted: Right Threw: Right

MLB debut
- April 15, 1952, for the Pittsburgh Pirates

Last MLB appearance
- April 14, 1953, for the Pittsburgh Pirates

MLB statistics
- Batting average: .260
- Home runs: 0
- Runs batted in: 15
- Stats at Baseball Reference

Teams
- Pittsburgh Pirates (1952–1953)

Clement John Koshorek (June 20, 1925 – September 8, 1991) was an American professional baseball player who had a 14-season career, mostly in the minor leagues. The infielder appeared in 99 games in Major League Baseball for the 1952–1953 Pittsburgh Pirates. Born in Royal Oak, Michigan, Koshorek threw and batted right-handed. He stood 5 feet 4 inches (1.63 m) tall and weighed 165 pounds (75 kg).

== Detroit Tigers prospect ==
Koshorek's minor league career began in the farm system of the Detroit Tigers in 1946. As the shortstop for the Flint Arrows in the higher-level Central League from 1948 to 1950, he was nicknamed "Scooter". Koshorek was considered a good prospect, but he briefly quit the game after he was turned down for a raise in pay by Tigers farm director Red Rolfe. Koshorek was eventually reinstated by the Tigers, playing for the Charleston Rebels of the Sally League, then the Little Rock Travelers of the Double-A Southern Association. He was selected by the Pirates in the 1951 Rule 5 draft.

== Pittsburgh Pirates infielder ==
Koshorek was a member of the Pirates' MLB roster for the entire 1952 season. Appearing in 98 games, he stated 33 games at shortstop, 25 at third base and 24 at second base, and batted .261 with 84 hits, including 17 doubles. He drove in 15 runs. But the 1952 Pirates won only 42 of 154 games, the franchise's worst record in the post-1900 era. Koshorek appeared in only one contest in 1953, as a pinch hitter April 14, when he struck out against Joe Black of the Brooklyn Dodgers. He was sent to the minors, where he played for almost seven full seasons, including one (1959) as player–manager of the Palatka Redlegs, a Cincinnati farm team.

An article in the June 1958 issue of Baseball Digest includes the 5'4" Koshorek with other smaller infielders like Rabbit Maranville, Sparky Adams, Phil Rizzuto and Skeeter Scalzi. These players, the writer noted, had to do more to impress baseball scouts.
