= Cal Hogue =

American baseball player (1927–2005)

- Pitcher
- Born: October 24, 1927; Dayton, Ohio, U.S.
- Died: August 5, 2005 (aged 77); Kettering, Ohio, U.S.
- Batted: Right Threw: Right

MLB debut
- July 15, 1952, for the Pittsburgh Pirates

Last MLB appearance
- April 24, 1954, for the Pittsburgh Pirates

MLB statistics
- Win–loss record: 2–10
- Earned run average: 4.91
- Innings pitched: 113 2/3
- Stats at Baseball Reference

Teams
- Pittsburgh Pirates (1952–1954)

Calvin Grey Hogue (October 24, 1927 – August 5, 2005) was an American professional baseball player, a right-handed pitcher who appeared in 25 Major League Baseball games between 1952 and 1954 for the Pittsburgh Pirates. The native of Dayton, Ohio, stood 6 feet (1.83 m) tall and weighed 185 pounds (84 kg).

Hogue spent his rookie season, and 19 games of his MLB career, on one of the worst teams in history: the 1952 Pirates, who won only 42 of 154 games and finished 54 1/2 games out of first place in the National League. Recalled by Pittsburgh after compiling a 10–3 record with the Class A Charleston Rebels of the Sally League, Hogue threw a complete game, four-hit 2–1 victory over the Philadelphia Phillies in his second appearance in the Major Leagues on July 17. But he was hit hard in his next start, also against the Phillies, allowing ten earned runs in three innings pitched and taking the loss in 14–4 Phillie win. He started ten more games for the Pirates, but failed to win another game, finishing 1–8 (4.84), although he did throw two more complete games.

Hogue spent most of 1953 in the Double-A Texas League, and pitched in three games for the Pirates. He gained his second Major League win on September 27, throwing another complete game and beating the New York Giants, 6–4. Then Hogue made the 1954 Pirates coming out of spring training. He started two April games, but failed to last past four complete innings in each one. He retired from professional baseball after three games with the 1957 Columbus Jets of the Triple-A International League.

During his Major League career, Hogue issued 96 bases on balls in 113 2/3 innings and allowed 109 hits, with 54 strikeouts.
