= Brandy Davis =

American baseball player (1927–2005)

- Outfielder
- Born: September 10, 1927; Newark, Delaware
- Died: June 12, 2005 (aged 77); Newark, Delaware
- Batted: Right Threw: Right

MLB debut
- April 15, 1952, for the Pittsburgh Pirates

Last MLB appearance
- September 26, 1953, for the Pittsburgh Pirates

MLB statistics
- Batting average: .187
- Home runs: 0
- Runs scored: 19
- Stats at Baseball Reference

Teams
- Pittsburgh Pirates (1952–1953)

Career highlights and awards
- 1989 Delaware Sports Hall of Fame

Robert Brandon Davis (September 10, 1927 – June 12, 2005) was an American professional baseball player, manager, coach and longtime scout who spent 52 years in the game. In his playing days, the outfielder appeared in 67 games in Major League Baseball for the Pittsburgh Pirates during the 1952 and 1953 seasons. He threw and batted right-handed, stood 6 feet (1.8 m) tall and weighed 170 pounds (77 kg), and was a native and lifelong resident of Newark, Delaware.

== Playing career ==
Prior to his professional career, Davis played baseball at Newark High School and Duke University and served in the United States Marine Corps. His pro career began in the Pittsburgh organization in 1951, when he batted a composite .313 across three lower levels of minor league baseball. He then spent 55 games in the majors for the 1952 Pirates, a team that would lose 112 games. He drew a base on balls in his initial big-league appearance as a pinch hitter on April 15; then, the following day, he started in right field and collected two hits in four at bats against left-hander Cliff Chambers of the St. Louis Cardinals. But Davis struggled at the plate thereafter; overall he hit only .179 and spent part of the year with Class B Waco. In 1953, he spent much of the year in the minor leagues before his recall in September for his final trial with the Pirates. But that resulted in only a .205 average in 39 at bats.

Davis' 25 career MLB hits included three doubles and one triple. He batted .187 lifetime with three runs batted in. But he showed speed on the base paths, stealing nine bases during his 55-game 1952 stint with the Pirates. His obituary, noting his offensive struggles, observed: "He was forced from the league after it was discovered he could not successfully steal first base."

== Longtime scout ==
His playing career continued through 1957, then Davis became a player-manager in the Los Angeles Dodgers' organization from 1958 to 1960. After that season, he sporadically served as a manager in the minor leagues, but concentrated primarily on scouting. He worked for multiple organizations, including his hometown MLB team, the Philadelphia Phillies. In 1972, he served on the coaching staff of the Phils' interim manager, Paul Owens.

Davis was inducted in 1989 to the Delaware Sports Museum and Hall of Fame. For some time he served on its board of governors. He died at age 77 at his Newark residence.
