= Jim Dunn (pitcher) =

American baseball player (1931–1999)

- Pitcher
- Born: February 25, 1931; Valdosta, Georgia, U.S.
- Died: January 6, 1999 (aged 67); Gadsden, Alabama, U.S.
- Batted: Right Threw: Right

MLB debut
- August 26, 1952, for the Pittsburgh Pirates

Last MLB appearance
- September 12, 1952, for the Pittsburgh Pirates

MLB statistics
- Win–loss record: 0–0
- Earned run average: 3.38
- Innings pitched: 5 1/3
- Stats at Baseball Reference

Teams
- Pittsburgh Pirates (1952)

James William Dunn (February 25, 1931 – January 6, 1999) — also known as Bill Dunn — was an American professional baseball player, a right-handed pitcher who worked in three Major League games, all in relief, for the 1952 Pittsburgh Pirates. Dunn stood 6 feet (1.8 m) tall and weighed 185 pounds (84 kg). He graduated from Gadsden, Alabama, High School in 1949 and attended the University of Alabama.

Dunn's professional career extended for nine seasons (1951–1959), spent in the Pirates' and Chicago Cubs' organizations. In his first two MLB appearances, August 26 and 28, 1952, he faced the defending National League champion New York Giants and pitched 3⅓ hitless, scoreless innings, with two strikeouts. In his final big league game, on September 12, he worked two innings and allowed two earned runs on four hits to the Boston Braves at Braves Field.

He spent the rest of his career in minor league baseball, winning 15 games for the Class C Billings Mustangs in 1955 in his finest season.
