= Dick Smith (third baseman) =

American baseball player (1926–2021)

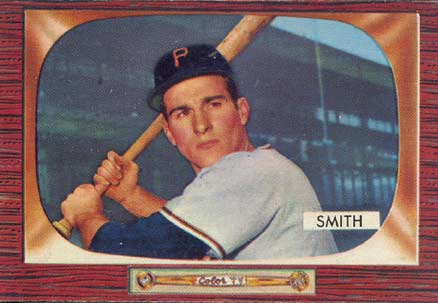
- Third baseman
- Born: July 21, 1926; Blandburg, Pennsylvania, U.S.
- Died: January 25, 2021 (aged 94); Boalsburg, Pennsylvania, U.S.
- Batted: Right Threw: Right

MLB debut
- September 14, 1951, for the Pittsburgh Pirates

Last MLB appearance
- May 1, 1955, for the Pittsburgh Pirates

MLB statistics
- Batting average: .134
- Home runs: 0
- Runs batted in: 11
- Stats at Baseball Reference

Teams
- Pittsburgh Pirates (1951–1955)

Richard Harrison Smith (July 21, 1926 – January 25, 2021) was an American professional baseball player who appeared in seventy games over parts of five Major League Baseball seasons (1951–1955) as a member of the Pittsburgh Pirates. Smith was primarily a third baseman who also played shortstop and second base.

== Biography ==
The Blandburg, Pennsylvania, native threw and batted right-handed and was listed as 5 feet 8 inches (1.73 m) tall and 160 pounds (73 kg). He attended Penn State University and Lock Haven University of Pennsylvania.

Smith's professional career lasted for a dozen seasons, beginning in 1949. His highest MLB batting average was .174 in forty-six at bats during his rookie 1951 campaign. Lifetime, he hit .134, with his twenty-five hits including two doubles and two triples. He was credited with eleven runs batted in. In his longest stint in the majors, Smith appeared in twenty-nine games for the last-place 1952 Pirates, but collecting seven hits and batting .106. The Pirates went 42–112 that year.

After his playing career, Smith became a professor of sports science and physical education at Pennsylvania State University, as well as an assistant coach of the Nittany Lions' varsity baseball team. He died on January 25, 2021, in Boalsburg, Pennsylvania.
