= Harry Fisher (baseball) =

Canadian baseball player (1926–1981)

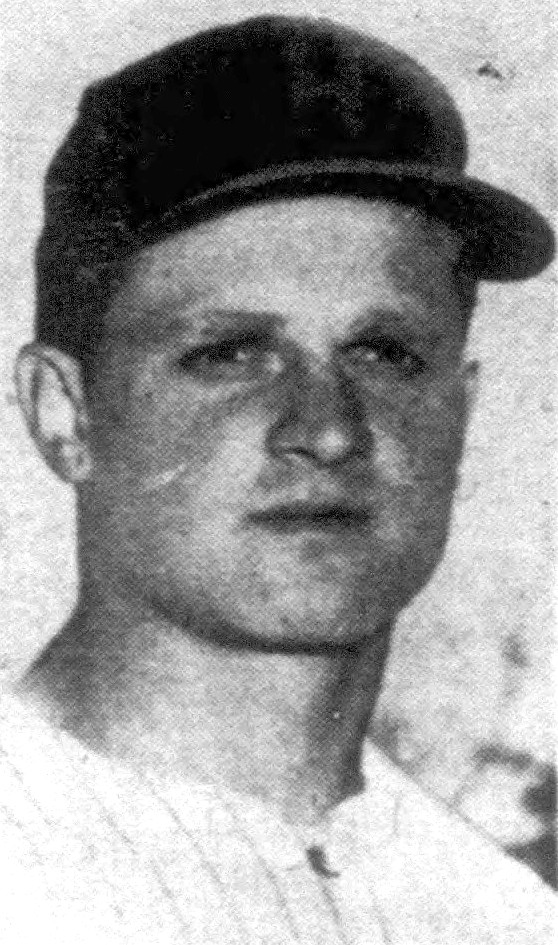
- Fisher, circa 1953
- Pitcher / Pinch hitter
- Born: January 3, 1926; Newbury, Ontario, Canada
- Died: September 20, 1981 (aged 55); Waterloo, Ontario, Canada
- Batted: Left Threw: Right

MLB debut
- September 16, 1951, for the Pittsburgh Pirates

Last MLB appearance
- August 8, 1952, for the Pittsburgh Pirates

MLB statistics
- Win–loss record: 1–2
- Earned run average: 6.87
- Innings pitched: 18 1/3
- Strikeouts: 5
- Stats at Baseball Reference

Teams
- Pittsburgh Pirates (1951–1952)

Harry Devereaux Fisher (January 3, 1926 – September 20, 1981) was a Canadian professional baseball player. Primarily a right-handed pitcher, his skill as a batter also enabled him to play outfield in minor league baseball and pinch hit at both the minor and Major League levels. He batted left-handed, stood 6 feet (1.8 m) tall and weighed 180 pounds (82 kg) (12 stone 12).

== Career ==
Fisher's professional career lasted for 12 seasons (1947–54; 1956–59). In 1949–50, with the New Orleans Pelicans of the Double-A Southern Association, Fisher batted .397 and .423 in successive seasons, although, as a pitcher (and part-time outfielder in 1950), he was well short of enough at bats (58 and 156, respectively) or plate appearances to win the SA batting championship.

He appeared in 18 Major League games with the 1951–52 Pittsburgh Pirates — ten as a pinch hitter and eight as a pitcher. In his first trial with the 1951 Bucs, Fisher was used exclusively in a pinch hitting role, going hitless in three at bats. In 1952, he began the season with the Hollywood Stars of the Open-Classification Pacific Coast League until his recall by the Pirates. In his first MLB contest of the season, on June 21, he got his first Major League hit, a pinch single off Carl Erskine of the Brooklyn Dodgers at Ebbets Field. He would pinch hit three more times until he took the mound July 2 for his debut MLB pitching assignment; in relief of Ron Kline, he allowed no runs and two hits in two innings of work in a 3–0 Pittsburgh defeat at the hands of the Chicago Cubs at Wrigley Field. Two days later, on July 4 at Crosley Field, Fisher got his maiden starting assignment in the Majors, and he defeated the Cincinnati Reds 5–2 for his only big league victory. Fisher worked six innings and scattered five hits, allowing two earned runs, and left the game with the lead, 3–2.

Fisher made ten more appearances for the Pirates that season, six as a pitcher, losing his last two starts to the Boston Braves on July 13 and New York Giants on August 1. Returning to minor league baseball, he played through 1959 (sitting out the 1955 season), gradually logging more time in the outfield to take advantage of his batting prowess.

As a Major Leaguer, he gave up 17 hits and 13 bases on balls in 18 1/3 innings pitched, recording five strikeouts. As a batter, he hit .278; his five MLB hits included one double and he had one run batted in.
