= Ted Beard =

American baseball player (1921–2011)

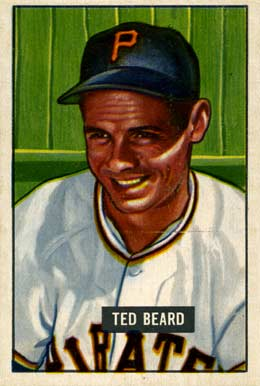
- Outfielder
- Born: January 7, 1921; Woodsboro, Maryland, U.S.
- Died: December 30, 2011 (aged 90); Fishers, Indiana, U.S.
- Batted: Left Threw: Left

MLB debut
- September 5, 1948, for the Pittsburgh Pirates

Last MLB appearance
- May 13, 1958, for the Chicago White Sox

MLB statistics
- Batting average: .198
- Home runs: 6
- Runs batted in: 35
- Stats at Baseball Reference

Teams
- Pittsburgh Pirates (1948–1952); Chicago White Sox (1957–1958)

Cramer Theodore Beard (January 7, 1921 – December 30, 2011) was an American professional baseball player who played for the Pittsburgh Pirates and the Chicago White Sox for parts of seven seasons spanning 1948–1958. Born in Woodsboro, Maryland, the outfielder threw and batted left-handed, stood 5 feet 8 inches (173 cm) tall and weighed 165 pounds (75 kg).

Beard was signed by the Pittsburgh Pirates as an amateur free agent in 1942 and spent the next six years playing in the minor leagues. Upon reaching the Majors, he played in the outfield for the Pirates for five seasons until his contract was purchased by the San Francisco Seals on April 8, 1954, for $10,000. His contract was again sold on March 1, 1956, to the Cleveland Indians. Prior to the 1957 season, Beard was assigned to the Indianapolis Indians before being called up to the big leagues by the White Sox later that season. In his seven-year big league career, Beard played in 194 games and garnered 94 hits, including 11 doubles, six triples and six home runs.

Beard played for Indianapolis for all or part of 13 seasons during the period of 1947 to 1963, and was the Indians' player-manager for part of the 1960 season. He settled in the Indianapolis suburbs, in Fishers, Indiana, where he died in 2011 at the age of 90.
