= Mel Queen =

Mel Queen is the name of:

- Mel Queen (pitcher) (1918–1982), MLB pitcher
- Mel Queen (pitcher/outfielder) (1942–2011), MLB player/manager
