= Bobby Del Greco =

American baseball player (1933–2019)

- Center fielder
- Born: April 7, 1933; Pittsburgh, Pennsylvania, U.S.
- Died: October 13, 2019 (aged 86); Beechview, Pennsylvania, U.S.
- Batted: Right Threw: Right

MLB debut
- April 16, 1952, for the Pittsburgh Pirates

Last MLB appearance
- May 8, 1965, for the Philadelphia Phillies

MLB statistics
- Batting average: .229
- Home runs: 42
- Runs batted in: 169
- Stats at Baseball Reference

Teams
- Pittsburgh Pirates (1952, 1956); St. Louis Cardinals (1956); Chicago Cubs (1957); New York Yankees (1957–1958); Philadelphia Phillies (1960–1961); Kansas City Athletics (1961–1963); Philadelphia Phillies (1965)

Robert George Del Greco (April 7, 1933 – October 13, 2019) was an American professional baseball outfielder, who played in Major League Baseball (MLB) for six teams during the 1950s and 1960s, including the Pittsburgh Pirates (1952 and 1956), St. Louis Cardinals (1956), Chicago Cubs (1957), New York Yankees (1957–58), Philadelphia Phillies (1960–61, 1965), and Kansas City Athletics (1961–63). He threw and batted right-handed; Del Greco stood 5 feet 10 inches (1.78 m) tall and weighed 185 pounds (84 kg), during his playing days.

Del Greco grew up in Pittsburgh's Hill District and was signed by the hometown Pirates. They traded him to the Cardinals on May 17, 1956, in a deal that brought center fielder Bill Virdon to Pittsburgh.

After spending most of 1957 with the seventh-place Cubs and in Triple-A, Del Greco was acquired by the pennant-winning Yankees, on September 10. He was a light-hitting, speedy, and defensively-sound player. The Yankees used him to fill in for Mickey Mantle in the late innings, but Del Greco did not appear in the 1957 World Series, won by the Milwaukee Braves in seven games. He was the regular center fielder for the A's from July 1961 through 1963, hitting a composite .233 in 327 games played. After a minor-league stint in 1964, Del Greco played his last MLB game for the Phillies, in May 1965 and retired from baseball after the 1966 campaign.

In nine major league seasons Del Greco played in 731 games, with 1,982 at bats, 271 runs, 454 hits, 95 doubles, 11 triples, 42 home runs, 169 RBI, 16 stolen bases, 271 walks, a .229 batting average, a .330 on-base percentage, a .352 slugging percentage, 697 total bases, and 29 sacrifice hits.

Del Greco died October 13, 2019.

On October 29, 2022, Del Greco was posthumously inducted into the Pennsylvania Sports Hall of Fame.
