= Don Carlsen =

American baseball player (1926–2002)

- Pitcher
- Born: October 15, 1926; Chicago, Illinois, U.S.
- Died: September 22, 2002 (aged 75); Denver, Colorado, U.S.
- Batted: Right Threw: Right

MLB debut
- April 28, 1948, for the Chicago Cubs

Last MLB appearance
- May 24, 1952, for the Pittsburgh Pirates

MLB statistics
- Win–loss record: 2–4
- Earned run average: 6.00
- Strikeouts: 23
- Stats at Baseball Reference

Teams
- Chicago Cubs (1948); Pittsburgh Pirates (1951–1952)

Donald Herbert Carlsen (October 15, 1926 – September 22, 2002) was an American right-handed pitcher in Major League Baseball for the Chicago Cubs and Pittsburgh Pirates.

Born in Chicago, Illinois, Carlsen was signed by the Cubs as an amateur free agent in 1944 at age 17. After one season as a fielder, he spent two years in military service. Afterward, he pitched at Pepperdine University and the University of Denver and worked his way through the minor leagues until he got promoted to the Cubs in 1948. He made his one and only appearance for Chicago on April 28, allowing 4 earned runs in just one inning of relief work as the Cubs lost 8–1 to Johnny Vander Meer and the Cincinnati Reds. From 1948 through 1950, Carlsen pitched in the Cubs' minor league system. On December 21, 1950, he was purchased from the Cubs by the Hollywood entry in the Pacific Coast League. He was promoted to the Pittsburgh Pirates prior to the start of the 1951 season but split the year between the Pirates and the minors.

With the Pirates in 1951, Carlsen appeared in seven games, starting six. He earned his first major league win on August 19 against his former club, the Cubs, and won his second six days later against the Philadelphia Phillies. Those would end up being the only two wins of Carlsen's career, but he finished the season with respectable numbers of two wins, three losses, two complete games, and a 4.19 ERA.

The right-hander made his final five major league appearances in 1952 with the Pirates, starting one game. In ten total innings, he allowed 12 earned runs on 20 hits and five walks, making his final appearance on May 24 before returning to the minors. He remained there until 1954, finishing his career with the Williamsport Grays in the Pirates' minor league system at age 27.

For his career, Carlsen appeared in 13 games (7 starts), winning two and losing four with a 6.00 ERA.

Carlsen died in Denver, Colorado, on September 22, 2002, aged 75.
