= Jim Suchecki =

American baseball player (1927–2000)

- Pitcher
- Born: August 25, 1927; Chicago, Illinois, U.S.
- Died: July 20, 2000 (aged 72); Crofton, Maryland, U.S.
- Batted: Right Threw: Right

MLB debut
- May 20, 1950, for the Boston Red Sox

Last MLB appearance
- May 1, 1952, for the Pittsburgh Pirates

MLB statistics
- Win–loss record: 0–6
- Earned run average: 5.38
- Strikeouts: 56
- Stats at Baseball Reference

Teams
- Boston Red Sox (1950); St. Louis Browns (1951); Pittsburgh Pirates (1952)

James Joseph Suchecki (August 25, 1927 – July 20, 2000) was an American pitcher in Major League Baseball who played from 1950 through 1952 for the Boston Red Sox (1950), St. Louis Browns (1951) and Pittsburgh Pirates (1952). Listed at 5' 11", 185 lb., Suchecki batted and threw right-handed. He was born in Chicago.

In a three-season career, Suchecki posted a 0–6 record with a 5.38 ERA in 38 appearances, including six starts, 17 games finished, 56 strikeouts, 50 walks, 130 hits allowed, and 103.2 innings of work.

Suchecki died in Crofton, Maryland at age 72.
