= Ron Necciai =

American baseball player (born 1932)

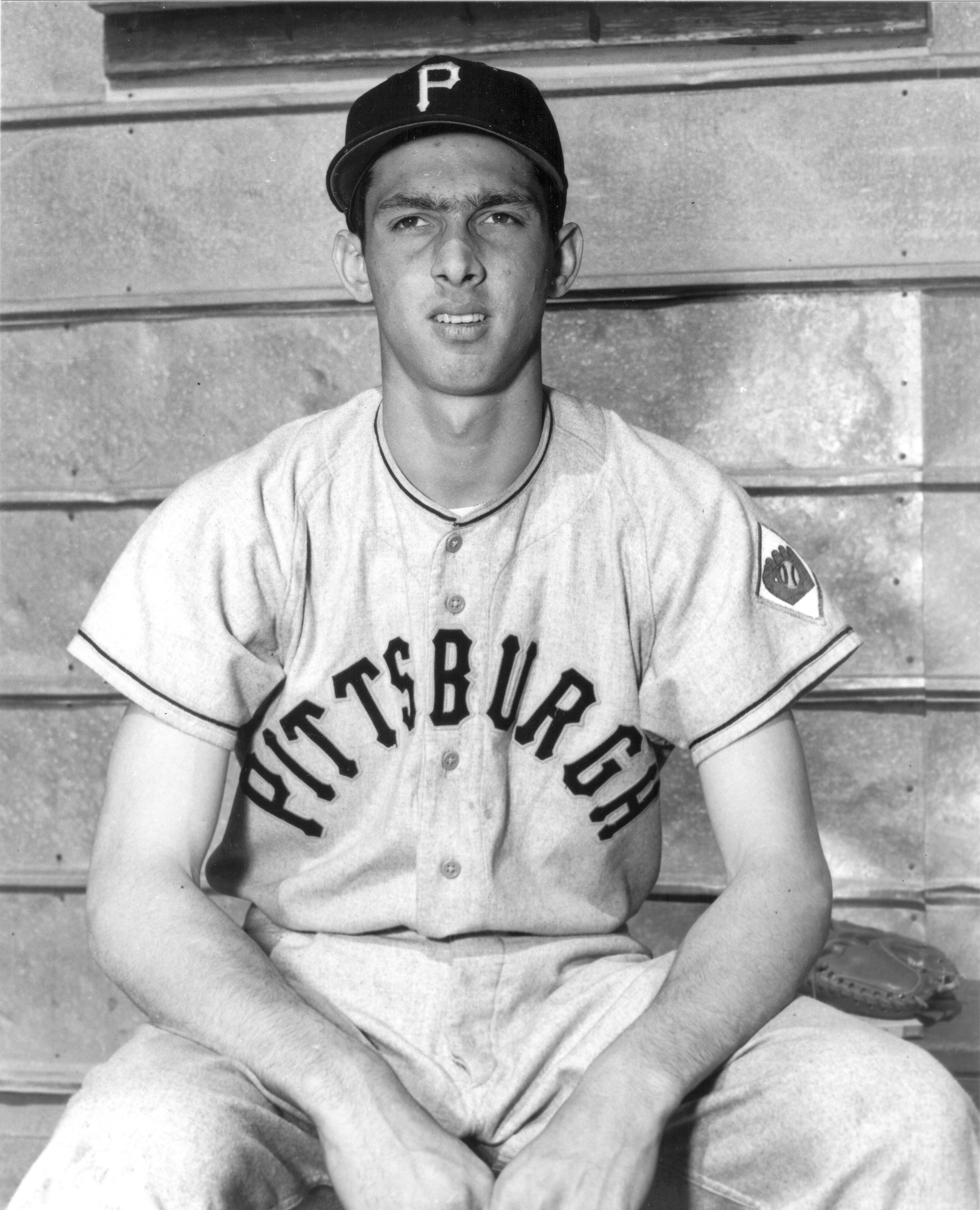
- Pitcher
- Born: June 18, 1932 (age 94); Gallatin, Pennsylvania, U.S.
- Batted: Right Threw: Right

MLB debut
- August 10, 1952, for the Pittsburgh Pirates

Last MLB appearance
- September 28, 1952, for the Pittsburgh Pirates

MLB statistics
- Win–loss record: 1–6
- Earned run average: 7.08
- Strikeouts: 31
- Stats at Baseball Reference

Teams
- Pittsburgh Pirates (1952)

Ronald Andrew Necciai [NEH-chai], (born June 18, 1932), is an American former Major League Baseball starting pitcher who played with the Pittsburgh Pirates in the 1952 season. He batted and threw right-handed.

Necciai is best remembered for the unique feat of striking out 27 batters in a nine-inning game, which he accomplished while playing with the Class-D Appalachian League team, the Bristol Twins, on May 13, 1952. He is the only pitcher ever to do so in a nine-inning, professional-league game.

== Minor League career ==
Necciai pitched two seasons of Class-D baseball before being drafted in the Pirates' farm system in 1952 at age 19. He was assigned to pitch for the Bristol Twins, the Pirates' Appalachian League team. On May 13, pitching despite painful stomach ulcers, Necciai struck out 27 batters while throwing a 7–0 no-hitter against the Welch Miners. Four of the Welch hitters did reach base, via a walk, an error, a hit batsman and a passed ball charged to Twins' catcher Harry Dunlop on a swinging uncaught third strike. This resulted in a four-strikeout ninth inning. Only two batters put the ball in play: Robert Ganung grounded out to first base in the fourth inning, while Frank Whitehead got on base on an error in the ninth.

In his next start, Necciai threw a 24-strikeout two-hitter.

In that season he struck out 109 hitters in 43 innings with Bristol, and a Carolina League-high 172 in 126 innings at Burlington before quickly climbing the ranks of the organization and eventually getting called up to the Major Leagues amid heavy publicity in August 1952.

== Major League career ==
At 20 years old, Necciai posted a 1–6 record with 31 strikeouts and a 7.08 earned run average in 54 2/3 innings pitched from August 10 to September 28, 1952, the single season comprising his entire Major League Baseball career.

== Later years ==
Necciai served a brief stint in the United States Army in 1953 before being released on a medical discharge. He returned to baseball thereafter, but was plagued by injuries resulting from his long-standing battle with stomach ulcers and further debilitation from a torn rotator cuff. He spent the years between 1953 and 1955 in various lower levels of professional baseball, but was ultimately unable to overcome injuries. He later began a successful career in the sporting goods industry.

== See also ==
- List of Major League Baseball pitchers with 18 strikeouts in one game
