= Ed Wolfe =

American baseball player (1929–2009)

- Pitcher
- Born: January 2, 1929; Los Angeles, California, U.S.
- Died: March 8, 2009 (aged 80); Modesto, California, U.S.
- Batted: Right Threw: Right

MLB debut
- April 19, 1952, for the Pittsburgh Pirates

Last MLB appearance
- April 25, 1952, for the Pittsburgh Pirates

MLB statistics
- Win–loss record: 0–0
- Strikeouts: 1
- Earned run average: 7.36
- Stats at Baseball Reference

Teams
- Pittsburgh Pirates (1952)

Edward Anthony Wolfe (January 2, 1929 – March 8, 2009) was an American professional baseball pitcher. He appeared in three games as a relief pitcher in Major League Baseball for the Pittsburgh Pirates during the 1952 season. Listed at 6' 3", 185 lb., he batted and threw right-handed.

A native of Los Angeles, California, Wolfe posted a 7.36 ERA and did not have a decision or save, giving up three runs on seven hits and five walks while striking out one in 3.2 innings of work.

Wolfe died in Modesto, California, at the age of 80.
