= Jack Merson =

American baseball player (1922–2000)

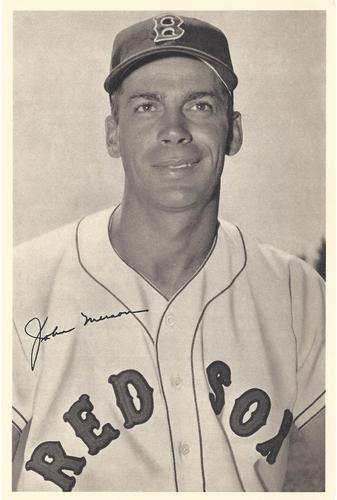
- Second baseman
- Born: January 17, 1922; Elkridge, Maryland, U.S.
- Died: April 28, 2000 (aged 78); Elkridge, Maryland, U.S.
- Batted: Right Threw: Right

MLB debut
- September 14, 1951, for the Pittsburgh Pirates

Last MLB appearance
- April 24, 1953, for the Boston Red Sox

MLB statistics
- Batting average: .257
- Home runs: 6
- RBI: 52
- Stats at Baseball Reference

Teams
- Pittsburgh Pirates (1951–1952); Boston Red Sox (1953)

John Warren Merson (January 17, 1922 – April 28, 2000) was an American professional baseball player. The second baseman and third baseman appeared in 125 games in the Major Leagues for the Pittsburgh Pirates and the Boston Red Sox—124 of them for the Pirates.

Merson was originally signed by the Washington Senators in 1940, but was released in 1941 without playing a single game for them. In 1947, the Pirates signed Merson as a free agent, and he made his debut with Pittsburgh in 1951. He played 111 of 154 games in 1952, batting .246 with five home runs and thirty-eight runs batted in. He became the first Pirates player to have a four-hit game early in his first few games when he went 4-for-5 in his second major league game on September 15, 1951. No other Pirates player would accomplish this feat until Brock Holt on September 4, 2012. Merson was the first player in Major League history to have ten RBIs in their first five games, a feat equalled only by Danny Espinosa in 2010 and Yasiel Puig in 2013.

During the 1952 off-season, the Red Sox took Merson in the Rule 5 draft. Merson appeared in one game for Boston in 1953 before being sent to the San Diego Padres of the Pacific Coast League. He played four seasons with the Padres before retiring from baseball in 1956.
