= Tony Bartirome =

American baseball player (1932–2018)

- First baseman
- Born: May 9, 1932; Pittsburgh, Pennsylvania, U.S.
- Died: June 22, 2018 (aged 86); Bradenton, Florida, U.S.
- Batted: Left Threw: Left

MLB debut
- April 19, 1952, for the Pittsburgh Pirates

Last MLB appearance
- September 28, 1952, for the Pittsburgh Pirates

MLB statistics
- Batting average: .220
- Hits: 78
- Runs batted in: 16
- Stats at Baseball Reference

Teams
- Pittsburgh Pirates (1952)

Anthony Joseph Bartirome (May 9, 1932 – June 22, 2018) was an American baseball player, coach and athletic trainer. He played first base for the Pittsburgh Pirates during the 1952 baseball season, after just one minor league season. He never appeared in another major league game following 1952, even though his professional career lasted through 1963. Prior to playing professionally, Bartirome was the star first baseman for a sandlot baseball team in Oakmont, Pennsylvania. He also went on to serve as a coach for the Atlanta Braves from 1986 to 1988. He was the team trainer for the Pittsburgh Pirates from 1967 to 1985.

Charlie Metro was his manager with the 1960 Denver Bears and offered this glowing praise: "Tony Bartirome was an absolute delight. I had Bo Osborne as a first baseman, and Tony had been there the year before. Tony was a good-fielding, little first baseman, not a very big guy. He was a left-handed hitter and thrower and was one of the most positive guys I've ever seen. I kept him on the ball club because he was great for the club. I regret one thing—I wanted to play him at shortstop or second base, because he was a left-hander, and I wanted to shake up things. I was hoping one of my infielders would catch a cold sometime so I could put him in there. I'd come in from the coaching box line when we were behind, and Tony would say, 'Don't worry, Skip. A couple of hits, a couple of bases on balls and a choke-up play, and we got 4 runs. We'll get them.' That was his idea of a rally! He became a fine trainer with the Pittsburgh Pirates for many years. If I could pattern a ball club with guys as positive as he was, I think I'd send a wire to the other managers: 'Forget first place.' What a guy to have on a club!"

Bartirome died on June 22, 2018, at the age of 86.
