= Bristol Twins =

- (1940–1955); Bristol, Virginia

Minor league affiliations
- Class: Class-D
- Previous leagues: Appalachian League

Major league affiliations
- Previous teams: New York Yankees (1954–1955); Pittsburgh Pirates (1952–1953); New York Giants (1942–1951)

Minor league titles
- League titles: 2 (1942, 1950)

Team data
- Ballpark: Shaw Stadium

The Bristol Twins were a Minor League Baseball team located in Bristol, Virginia, that operated in the Class D Appalachian League between the 1940 and 1955 seasons.

During their history, Twins were an affiliate team of the New York Giants (1942–1951), Pittsburgh Pirates (1952–1953) and New York Yankees (1954–1955). The team played their home games at Shaw Stadium.

In its sixteen seasons of existence, the Bristol Twins advanced to the playoffs series at total of fourteen times, winning the championship in 1942 and 1950.

== The Ballpark ==
The Twins played at Shaw Stadium, located at 1501 Euclid Street, on Gate City Highway. The ballpark had a capacity of 3,500. The site is now a factory.

== Notable alumni ==
- Billy Gardner (1945)
- Art Fowler (1944)
- Charlie Fox (1942, 1947)
- Ron Necciai (1952)
- Bobby Thomson (1942) 3 x MLB All-Star

== Seasons ==
Year	Affiliate	Record	Finish	Manager	Playoffs
1940	n/a	54-60	4th	Larry Merville; Tim Murchison; Lance Richbourg	Lost in First Round
1941	n/a	72-45	2nd	George Hackett; Lee Sherrill	Lost in First Round
1942	n/a	71-36	1st	Hal Gruber	Championship title
1943	NYG	74-35	1st	Hal Gruber	Lost Final Series
1944	NYG	54-53	2nd	Hal Gruber	Lost Final Series
1945	NYG	64-45	1st	Hal Gruber	Lost Final Series
1946	NYG	72-51	2nd	Don Cross	Lost in First Round
1947	NYG	64-62	4th	Charlie Fox	Lost in First Round
1948	NYG	49-72	6th	Rufus Jackson; Dale Alexander	
1949	NYG	76-41	3rd	Ben Geraghty	Lost Final Series
1950	NYG	74-47	2nd	Ben Geraghty	Championship title
1951	NYG	56-73	5th	Russ Wein	
1952	PIT	60-57	2nd	George DeTore	Lost in First Round
1953	PIT	54-72	4th	George DeTore	
1954	NYY	65-51	3rd	Walter Lance	Lost in First Round
1955	NYY	63-61	3rd	Dave Madison	Lost in First Round

== Fact ==
- Ron Necciai pitched for Bristol before joining the Pittsburgh Pirates. On May 13, 1952 Necciai struck out 27 batters while throwing a 7–0 no-hitter against the Welch Miners. Four of the Welch hitters did reach base, including one runner each via a walk, an error, a hit batsman and a passed ball charged to Twins' catcher Harry Dunlop on a swinging third strike. This resulted in a four-strikeout ninth inning. In his next start Necciai threw a 24-strikeout two-hitter, posting a 4-0 record with a 0.42 earned run average and 109 strikeouts in 43 innings of work.
