= Clyde McCullough =

American baseball player (1917–1982)

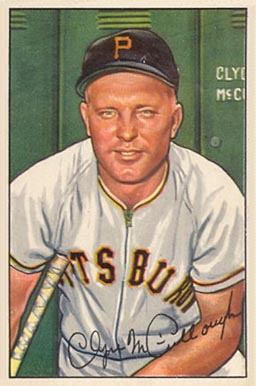
- Catcher
- Born: March 4, 1917; Nashville, Tennessee, U.S.
- Died: September 18, 1982 (aged 65); San Francisco, California, U.S.
- Batted: Right Threw: Right

MLB debut
- April 28, 1940, for the Chicago Cubs

Last MLB appearance
- July 22, 1956, for the Chicago Cubs

MLB statistics
- Batting average: .252
- Home runs: 52
- Runs batted in: 339
- Stats at Baseball Reference

Teams
- As player: Chicago Cubs (1940–1943, 1946–1948); Pittsburgh Pirates (1949–1952); Chicago Cubs (1953–1956); As coach: Washington Senators/Minnesota Twins (1960–1961); New York Mets (1963); San Diego Padres (1982)

Career highlights and awards
- 2× All-Star (1948, 1953)

Clyde Edward McCullough (March 4, 1917 – September 18, 1982) was an American catcher in Major League Baseball. After his playing career ended, he also managed in the minor leagues and was a major-league coach. Born in Nashville, Tennessee, McCullough batted and threw right-handed and in his playing days stood 5 ft 11 1/2 in (1.82 m) (182 cm) tall and weighed 180 pounds (82 kg).

Originally a member of the New York Yankees farm system, he never played for them; instead, he was sold to the Chicago Cubs in September 1939 after toiling for the Yankees' Kansas City Blues farm club. He spent 11 seasons of his 15-year career for the Cubs, except for four years (1949–52) with the Pittsburgh Pirates. He missed the 1944 and 1945 seasons to serve in the United States Navy during World War II, but returned to the Cubs in late 1945 to make one pinch-hitting appearance in the 1945 World Series.

In his playing career, he hit 15 home runs, collected 785 hits, and batted .252 in 1,098 games. McCullough played in two All Star games for the National League, in 1948 and 1953. He also caught Sam Jones' no-hitter on May 12, 1955.

McCullough makes a cameo appearance in William Bast's 1956 biography of James Dean. Bast relates that McCullough was the driver who gave Bast, Dean and another friend a ride in the summer of 1952 when they were hitchhiking to Dean's childhood farm home for an impromptu "vacation". In the anecdote, McCullough comes across as kind, caring and generous, expressing admiration for the contribution of actors to cultural life, and even offering some money to the clearly cash-strapped young trio (and is understanding when it is refused).

As a coach, McCullough worked with the Washington Senators/Minnesota Twins (1960–61), New York Mets (1963) and San Diego Padres (1982). He was a key manager and instructor in the Mets' farm system in the mid- to late-1960s when the club developed young pitchers such as Tom Seaver, Nolan Ryan, Jerry Koosman and Tug McGraw. In 1982, McCullough was serving as the Padres' bullpen coach when he was found dead in his San Francisco hotel room on September 18 during a road trip. He was 65. He was interred in Rosewood Memorial Park Cemetery, Virginia Beach, Virginia.

In 1983, McCullough was inducted into the Virginia Sports Hall of Fame.
