= Bill Bell (baseball) =

American baseball player (1933–1962)

- Pitcher
- Born: October 24, 1933; Goldsboro, North Carolina, U.S.
- Died: October 11, 1962 (aged 28); Durham, North Carolina, U.S.
- Batted: Right Threw: Right

MLB debut
- September 5, 1952, for the Pittsburgh Pirates

Last MLB appearance
- October 11, 1955, for the Pittsburgh Pirates

MLB statistics
- Win–loss record: 0–1
- Earned run average: 4.32
- Strikeouts: 4
- Stats at Baseball Reference

Teams
- Pittsburgh Pirates (1952, 1955)

William Samuel "Ding Dong" Bell (October 24, 1933 – October 11, 1962) was an American Major League Baseball pitcher. Bell played for the Pittsburgh Pirates in 1952 and 1955. In 5 career games, he had a 0–1 record, with a 4.32 ERA. He batted and threw right-handed.

In 1952, Bell threw three no-hitters while pitching in the Appalachian League. The only other person to do this in professional baseball history is Tom Drees.

Bell died at age 28 in Durham, North Carolina, on October 11, 1962, from devastating injuries he had sustained in a car accident in January 1962.
