= 1952 in baseball =

The following are the baseball events of the year 1952 throughout the world.

== Champions ==
=== Major League Baseball ===
- World Series: New York Yankees over Brooklyn Dodgers (4–3)
- All-Star Game, July 8 at Shibe Park: National League, 3–2 (5 innings)

=== Other champions ===
- All-American Girls Professional Baseball League: South Bend Blue Sox
- College World Series: Holy Cross
- Japan Series: Yomiuri Giants over Nankai Hawks (4–2)
- Little League World Series: Norwalk National, Norwalk, Connecticut

Winter Leagues

- 1952 Caribbean Series: Senadores de San Juan
- Cuban League: Leones del Habana
- Dominican Republic League: Águilas Cibaeñas
- Mexican Pacific League: Tacuarineros de Culiacán
- Panamanian League: Carta Vieja Yankees
- Puerto Rican League: Senadores de San Juan
- Venezuelan League: Cervecería Caracas

== Awards and honors ==
- Baseball Hall of Fame
  - Harry Heilmann
  - Paul Waner
- MLB Most Valuable Player Award
  - Hank Sauer (CHC, National)
  - Bobby Shantz (PHA, American)
- MLB Rookie of the Year Award
  - Joe Black (BRO, National)
  - Harry Byrd (PHA, American)
- The Sporting News Player of the Year Award
  - Robin Roberts (PHI)
- The Sporting News Pitcher of the Year Award
  - Robin Roberts (PHI, National)
  - Bobby Shantz (CLE, American)
- The Sporting News Rookie of the Year Award
  - Joe Black (BRO, National)
  - Clint Courtney (SLB, American)
- The Sporting News Manager of the Year Award
  - Eddie Stanky (STL)

== Statistical leaders ==
	American League		National League	
Stat	Player	Total	Player	Total
AVG	Ferris Fain (PHA)	.327	Stan Musial (STL)	.336
HR	Larry Doby (CLE)	32	Ralph Kiner (PIT); Hank Sauer (CHC)	37
RBI	Al Rosen (CLE)	105	Hank Sauer (CHC)	121
W	Bobby Shantz (PHA)	24	Robin Roberts (PHI)	28
ERA	Allie Reynolds (NYY)	2.06	Hoyt Wilhelm (NYG)	2.43
K	Allie Reynolds (NYY)	160	Warren Spahn (BSN)	183

== Major league baseball final standings ==
=== American League final standings ===
American League
Team	W	L	Pct.	GB	Home	Road
New York Yankees	95	59	.617	—	49‍–‍28	46‍–‍31
Cleveland Indians	93	61	.604	2	49‍–‍28	44‍–‍33
Chicago White Sox	81	73	.526	14	44‍–‍33	37‍–‍40
Philadelphia Athletics	79	75	.513	16	45‍–‍32	34‍–‍43
Washington Senators	78	76	.506	17	42‍–‍35	36‍–‍41
Boston Red Sox	76	78	.494	19	50‍–‍27	26‍–‍51
St. Louis Browns	64	90	.416	31	42‍–‍35	22‍–‍55
Detroit Tigers	50	104	.325	45	32‍–‍45	18‍–‍59

Locations of teams for the 1942–1953 American League seasons
American League

=== National League final standings ===
National League
Team	W	L	Pct.	GB	Home	Road
Brooklyn Dodgers	96	57	.627	—	45‍–‍33	51‍–‍24
New York Giants	92	62	.597	4½	50‍–‍27	42‍–‍35
St. Louis Cardinals	88	66	.571	8½	48‍–‍29	40‍–‍37
Philadelphia Phillies	87	67	.565	9½	47‍–‍29	40‍–‍38
Chicago Cubs	77	77	.500	19½	42‍–‍35	35‍–‍42
Cincinnati Reds	69	85	.448	27½	38‍–‍39	31‍–‍46
Boston Braves	64	89	.418	32	31‍–‍45	33‍–‍44
Pittsburgh Pirates	42	112	.273	54½	23‍–‍54	19‍–‍58

Locations of teams for the 1943–1952 National League seasons
National League

== All-American Girls Professional Baseball League final standings ==
Rank	Team	W	L	Pct.	GB
1	Fort Wayne Daisies	67	42	.613	—
2	South Bend Blue Sox	64	45	.587	3
3	Rockford Peaches	55	54	.505	10
4	Grand Rapids Chicks	50	60	.455	17½
5	Kalamazoo Lassies	49	60	.450	18
6	Battle Creek Belles	43	67	.344	24

== Nippon Professional Baseball final standings ==
=== Central League final standings ===
Central League	G	W	L	T	Pct.	GB
Yomiuri Giants	120	83	37	0	.692	—
Osaka Tigers	120	79	40	1	.664	3.5
Nagoya Dragons	120	75	43	2	.636	7.0
Taiyo Whales	120	58	62	0	.483	25.0
Kokutetsu Swallows	120	50	70	0	.417	33.0
Hiroshima Carp	120	37	80	3	.316	44.5
Shochiku Robins	120	34	84	2	.288	48.0

=== Pacific League final standings ===
Pacific League	G	W	L	T	Pct.	GB
Nankai Hawks	121	76	44	1	.633	—
Mainichi Orions	120	75	45	0	.625	1.0
Nishitetsu Lions	120	67	52	1	.563	8.5
Daiei Stars	121	55	65	1	.458	21.0
Hankyu Braves	108	49	58	1	.458	20.5
Tokyu Flyers	108	49	59	0	.454	21.0
Kintetsu Pearls	108	30	78	0	.278	40.0

== Events ==
=== January ===
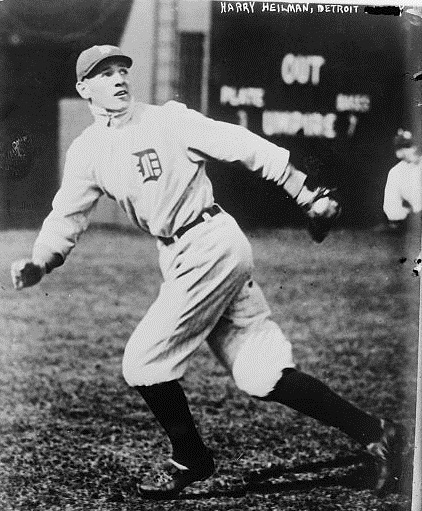
Harry Heilmann

- January 3 – The Chicago Cubs purchase the contract of 34-year-old knuckleballer Willie Ramsdell from the Cincinnati Reds. With his 17 losses in 1951, Ramsdell tied for the National League lead in that dubious category with Paul Minner (Cubs) and Ken Raffensberger (Reds).
- January 16 – The Boston Braves release outfielder–manager Tommy Holmes, 34, from his players' contract. He had batted only .172 in 1951 in 32 games, mostly as a pinch hitter.
- January 31 – Harry Heilmann with 203 votes, and Paul Waner with 195, become the newest members of the Hall of Fame.

=== February ===
- February 6 – The Cleveland Indians sign veteran outfielder Pete Reiser as a free agent. Reiser, 32, was a National League batting and stolen base champion and a "five-tool" star for the pre-World War II Brooklyn Dodgers, but a plethora of serious injuries—shoulder separations, broken bones (including a skull fracture), and concussions, most of them sustained when he ran fearlessly into outfield walls in pursuit of fly balls—has wrecked his career. Released in November 1951 by the Pittsburgh Pirates, his third NL team, Reiser will hit only .136 in 34 games for Cleveland in 1952, most of them as a pinch hitter, through July 5 in what is his last year as an active player.
- February 14 – The St. Louis Browns and Detroit Tigers make a seven-player trade, in which the Browns send left-handed pitcher Dick Littlefield, catcher Matt Batts, first baseman Ben Taylor and outfielder Cliff Mapes to Detroit for southpaws Bob Cain and Gene Bearden and first baseman Dick Kryhoski. Ironically, in Cain the Browns obtain the Tiger pitcher who faced 3 ft 7 in (1.09 m), 60 lb (27 kg) Eddie Gaedel in Bill Veeck's legendary stunt on August 19, 1951.
- February 16 – Hall of Famer Honus Wagner, 77, retires after 40 years as a major league player and coach. He receives a pension from the Pittsburgh Pirates, with whom he spent most of those years.
- February 21 & 26 – Thomas Fine of Cuba's Leones de la Habana hurls the first no-hitter in Caribbean Series history, a 1–0 masterpiece against Al Papai and Venezuela's Cervecería Caracas. Through 2013, it has been the only no-hitter pitched in Series history. Five days later, Fine is only three outs from consecutive no-hitters before he allows a single in the ninth inning of the Habana club's 11–3 victory over Panama's Carta Vieja Yankees. Fine's 17 consecutive hitless innings pitched record remains the longest in Caribbean Series history.

=== March ===
- March 1 – With the opening of spring training, MLB umpires are sent to the 16 clubs' camps to warn players against fraternizing with fans and opposing players. League presidents institute fines of $5 (initial offense) and $25 (repeat offenses) for violation of the rule. The warning, which is chiefly to combat gambling on game outcomes, is instituted in the wake of the 1951–1952 college basketball "point-shaving" scandal.
- March 20 – Philadelphia Phillies manager Eddie Sawyer, who took a hard line with his players by imposing an "austerity program" at the club's spring training camp—banning wives, automobiles, clubhouse card games, and golf (among other things), and enforcing a strict curfew—is so pleased by the Phils' improved performance that he relaxes some (though not all) of the restrictions he had implemented. However, the club gets off to a sluggish 4–7 April start and Sawyer will resign before June is out.
- March 24 – The Chicago White Sox deal third baseman Bob Dillinger, 33, a .306 lifetime hitter and three-time American League stolen base leader, but frequently scorned as an indifferent fielder, to the Sacramento Solons of the Pacific Coast League for a player to be named later and $10,000. He never plays in the major leagues again.

=== April ===
- April 1 – The 49-year-old Pacific Coast League begins its 180-game regular season as a member of an experimental level within Minor League Baseball called the "Open Classification." Elevated from Triple-A status, the PCL's "Open" designation marks its first step in a bid to become the third major league. In addition, the ability of MLB teams to draft PCL players is restricted, and member clubs are discouraged from signing working agreements with big-league "parent" organizations.
- April 4 – Pitcher Dave Hoskins, a 34-year-old veteran of the Chicago American Giants and Homestead Grays of the Negro leagues, becomes the first Black player in the Double-A Texas League when he takes the mound for the Dallas Eagles. Enduring death threats and Jim Crow laws during the season, Hoskins will post a 22–10 (2.12) record, leading the Dallas franchise to its first TL pennant since 1936.
- April 8 – The Boston Braves trade stalwart veteran third baseman Bob Elliott to the New York Giants for pitcher Sheldon Jones and $50,000. Known in Boston as "Mister Team" and 1947's National League MVP, Elliott, 35, is one of the few remaining members of the 1948 NL champion Braves.
- April 19 – In their second meeting of 1952, the Brooklyn Dodgers gain their second straight victory over the arch-rival New York Giants, 11–6, backed by five Brooklyn home runs. Despite giving up four homers today, Ralph Branca earns the complete-game triumph; it's the first time he's faced the Giants since giving up the pennant-deciding "Shot Heard 'Round the World" home run to Bobby Thomson on October 3, 1951. Thomson goes hitless in four at bats, with one base on balls, today.
- April 22 – At Crosley Field, three members of the St. Louis Cardinals are ejected, including manager Eddie Stanky, in a 2–1 loss to the home-standing Cincinnati Reds. Stanky's third-inning eviction features a shoving match with home plate umpire Scotty Robb. NL president Warren Giles, present in the stands, rules two weeks later that Robb instigated the physical contact, issues a reprimand, and fines the umpire—and triggers Robb's immediate resignation.
- April 23 – Bob Cain and the St. Louis Browns defeat Bob Feller and the Cleveland Indians, 1–0, in a game in which both pitchers throw a one-hitter. This was only the second double one-hitter in the modern era (since 1901).
- April 29 – At Shibe Park, third baseman Al Rosen of the Cleveland Indians socks three home runs and drives in seven and his club lashes 25 hits in all—an MLB high for 1951—as Cleveland thrashes the Philadelphia Athletics, 21–9.
- April 30
  - Veteran Negro leagues catcher Quincy Trouppe makes his major league debut with the Cleveland Indians. At 39 years of age, he is one of the oldest rookies in major league history. Three days later, Trouppe is behind the plate when relief pitcher Toothpick Sam Jones enters the game, forming the first black battery in American League history.
  - In the seventh inning at Fenway Park, Ted Williams of the Boston Red Sox hits a game-winning, two-run home run off Dizzy Trout of the Detroit Tigers to break a 3–3 tie on "Ted Williams Day." It is Williams' final game of the season before he departs for the Korean War to serve as a Marine fighter pilot. He plays only six contests in 1952 and goes four-for-ten, with today's blast his only home run of the campaign.

=== May ===
- May 3
  - The New York Yankees acquire outfielder Irv Noren and shortstop Tom Upton from the Washington Senators for pitcher Spec Shea, infielder Jerry Snyder, and outfielders Jackie Jensen and Archie Wilson. Noren becomes a valuable lefthanded-swinging outfielder in Casey Stengel's "platoon" system. Jensen gets to play regularly in his 1½ years as Washington's starting right fielder before he's traded to the Boston Red Sox after the 1953 campaign.
  - The Senators also trade outfielder Sam Mele to the Chicago White Sox for infielder Mel Hoderlein and outfielder Jim Busby.
- May 9 – The White Sox score three runs in the top of the 16th inning, then hold the Detroit Tigers off the scoreboard in the home half to claim an 8–5 win at Briggs Stadium. Future Hall-of-Famer Minnie Miñoso's triple is the key blow in the ChiSox' triumph.

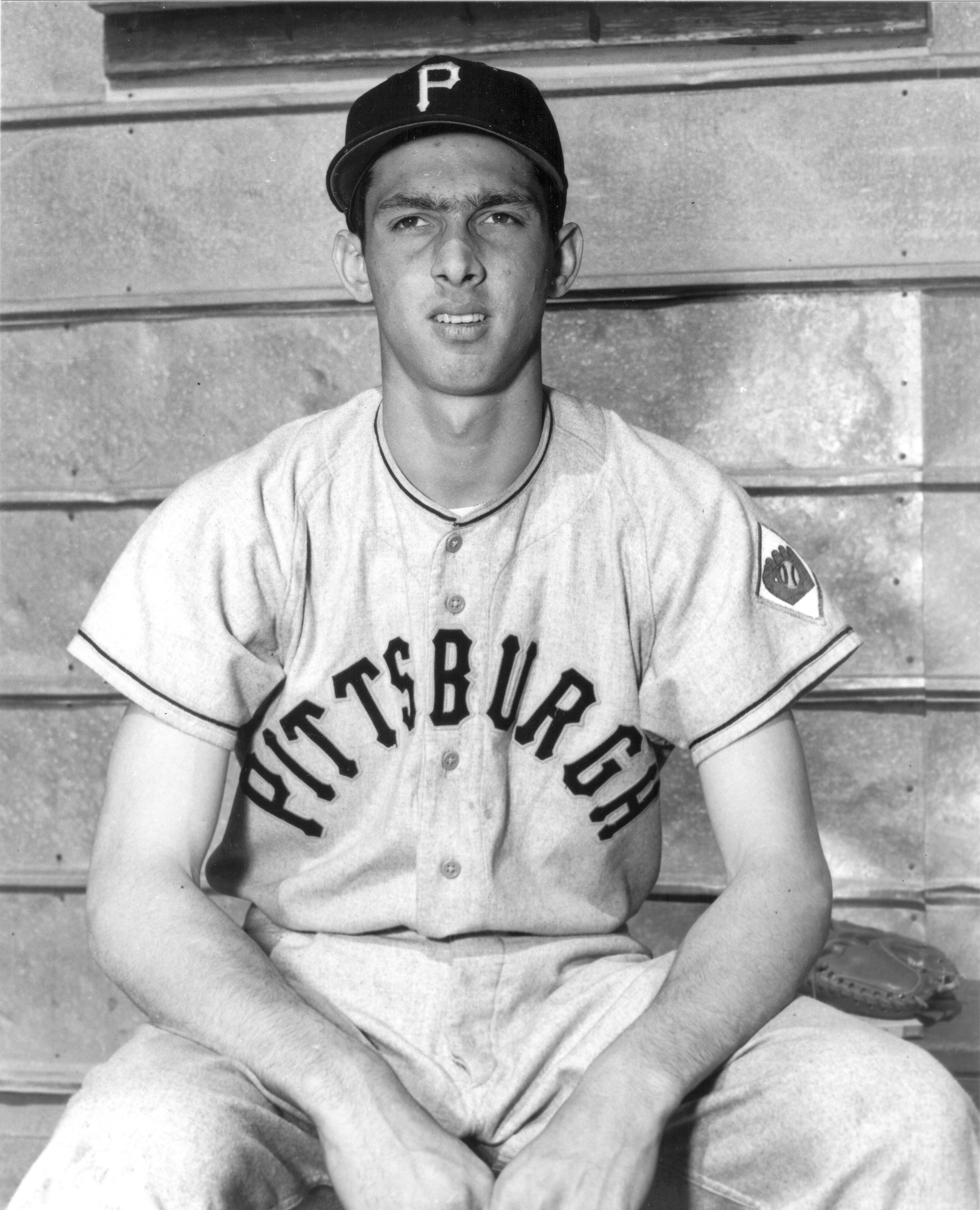
Ron Necciai

- May 13 – Ron Necciai of the Class-D Bristol Twins strikes out 27 batters while firing a 7–0, nine-inning no-hit victory against the Welch Miners in an Appalachian League game. Four of the Welch hitters reach base on a walk, an error, a hit by pitch, and a passed ball charged to Twins' catcher Harry Dunlop on a swinging third strike. But 27 strikeouts are recorded on the night, including four in the ninth inning, as a result of Dunlop's miscue, while one batter is retired on a grounder in the second inning.
- May 15 – After pitching four no-hitters in the minors, 33-year-old Virgil Trucks of the Detroit Tigers pitches his first in the majors, a 1–0 blanking of the Washington Senators. Vic Wertz's two-out home run in the ninth inning off Bob Porterfield wins the game at Briggs Stadium.
- May 21 – At Ebbets Field, the Brooklyn Dodgers set a Major League record by scoring 15 runs in the first inning of a 19–1 pounding of the Cincinnati Reds. All nine Dodgers in the starting lineup both score a run and bat in a run in that first inning.
- May 23 – The Cincinnati Reds trade left-hander Kent Peterson and outfielder Johnny Wyrostek to the Philadelphia Phillies for pitcher Bubba Church.
- May 26 – Ron Necciai's teammate on the Class-D Bristol Twins, 18-year-old right-hander Bill Bell, throws his second consecutive no-hit game, striking out 17 and walking 11 in defeating Kingsport. Bell will throw a third Appalachian League no-hitter on August 25, a seven-inning triumph over Bluefield. Like Necciai, he will be called up by the parent Pittsburgh Pirates in September for a taste of major league competition.
- May 28 – New York Giants sophomore centerfielder Willie Mays goes hitless in four at bats, dropping his 1952 batting average to .236 in 34 games. But his Giants defeat the Brooklyn Dodgers 6–2 at Ebbets Field, improving their record to 26–8 (.765) and they extend their lead over Brooklyn to 2½ games. After Mays is called into Korean War military service the following day, the Giants will finish second in 1952 and fifth in 1953 before Mays' return to baseball in 1954.
- May 29 – Boston Red Sox pitcher Mickey McDermott faces 27 batters and fires a one-hitter to beat the Washington Senators, 1–0, at Fenway Park. Mel Hoderlein's fourth-inning single is the only Washington hit and he is thrown out while trying to stretch his single into a double.
- May 30
  - After the Boston Braves (13–22 and seventh in the National League) drop a Memorial Day doubleheader to the Brooklyn Dodgers, they fire second-year manager Tommy Holmes. To replace him, they summon veteran Charlie Grimm from Triple-A Milwaukee to take the reins. Holmes, who went 61–69 (.469) in just under a full calendar year as the Braves' pilot, returns to the playing ranks June 17 when he signs with the Dodgers as a free agent.
  - In an unlikely doubleheader sweep at Yankee Stadium, the Philadelphia Athletics take two from their hosts, the Yankees, 2–1 behind Bobby Shantz' 14-inning complete game, and 4–2 behind hurlers Bob Hooper and Carl Scheib.
  - The last-place Pittsburgh Pirates split their twin bill with the St. Louis Cardinals at Forbes Field, improving their season mark to 9–33 (.214). En route to a 42–112 final record, the Bucs have already endured losing streaks of ten, eight and six games.

=== June ===
- June 1 – At Sportsman's Park, the New York Giants drop a doubleheader to the St. Louis Cardinals, 8–7 and 8–2, while the Brooklyn Dodgers defeat the Chicago Cubs 3–2 at Wrigley Field behind the pitching of Ben Wade and Joe Black. The Dodgers (27–10) move into first place in the National League by a game over the Giants (27–12).
- June 3 – The second-place Boston Red Sox (23–18) and last-place Detroit Tigers (13–27) make a nine-player trade and sports headlines: Boston sends pitcher Bill Wight, first baseman Walt Dropo, third baseman Johnny Pesky, infielder Fred Hatfield, and outfielder Don Lenhardt to Detroit for pitcher Dizzy Trout, third baseman George Kell, shortstop Johnny Lipon, and outfielder Hoot Evers. Dropo, Pesky, Trout, Kell and Evers are former American League All-Stars, and Kell is en route to the Baseball Hall of Fame. However, none of the traded players will make a significant mark with his new club.
- June 4 – The Cleveland Indians' Larry Doby hits for the cycle in a 13–11 loss to the Red Sox at Fenway Park. The future Hall of Famer drives in six runs. On the Boston side, second baseman Billy Goodman goes five for five (all singles), scores four runs, and knocks in three. Doby's is the only "cycle" in the majors this season.
- June 10
  - Rogers Hornsby's second tour of duty as dugout boss of the St. Louis Browns ends after only 51 games (and only 22 victories), when owner Bill Veeck replaces him with player-manager Marty Marion. The Browns' players celebrate the firing by presenting Veeck with a trophy after tonight's 7–4 victory over the Boston Red Sox to thank the owner for "emancipating" them from the irascible Hornsby's reign.
  - The Red Sox and Washington Senators do a three-pitcher deal, with Boston sending Randy Gumpert and Walt Masterson to Washington for Sid Hudson.
  - On the strength of home runs from Sam Mele, Héctor Rodríguez and Al Zarilla, the Chicago White Sox score 12 runs in the fourth inning at Shibe Park and rout the Philadelphia Athletics 15–4.
- June 11
  - The Browns' joy is short-lived. Boston catcher Sammy White clouts a walk-off grand slam in the ninth inning off Leroy "Satchel" Paige to give the Red Sox an 11–9 victory over the Brownies at Fenway Park.
  - During that uprising, the Red Sox end Paige's personal streak of 272/3 innings pitched of scoreless relief, compiled over 12 appearances and dating to May 8, third-longest in MLB in 1952. Their winning rally is started by rookie Jimmy Piersall, who beats out a bunt, then distracts the 45-year-old Paige with "hysterics on the base path [and] a series of pantomimes". Piersall's mocking antics will be among multiple public displays of a serious disorder that result in his treatment in a Boston-area mental hospital later in 1952; his story will be told in a memoir and feature film five years later.
- June 14
  - The Boston Braves purchase the contract of Hank Aaron from the Indianapolis Clowns and assign him to the Eau Claire Bears, the Braves' Class C farm team in the Northern League.
  - At Braves Field, ace left-hander Warren Spahn fans 18 Chicago Cubs in 15 innings, but surrenders a game-deciding triple to Hal Jeffcoat and loses the complete game, 3–1. Spahn accounts for Boston's only run with a solo home run in the sixth inning as the Braves gather only four hits.
- June 15
  - The St. Louis Browns acquire shortstop Willy Miranda and outfielder Al Zarilla from the Chicago White Sox for third baseman Leo Thomas and outfielder Tom Wright. Zarilla, a 33-year-old veteran, returns to St. Louis, where eight years before he was a member of the 1944 Browns, the city's only American League champion.
  - Infielder Tommy Brown, only 24 years old but already in his eighth National League season, changes address for the second time in two years when the Philadelphia Phillies sell his contract to the Chicago Cubs.

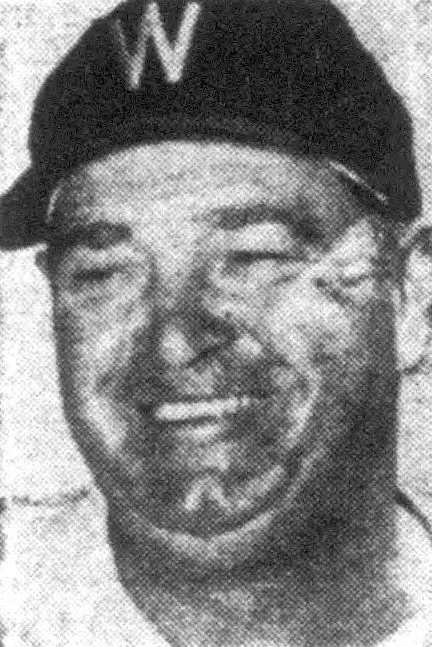
Louis "Bobo" Newsom

- June 16 – Colorful, well-traveled, 44-year-old right-hander Bobo Newsom changes uniforms for the final time, when he's released by the Washington Senators and signed by the Philadelphia Athletics. Since he first arrived in the majors in 1929, Newsom has pitched for nine different franchises, playing multiple stints for four of them (the Senators and Athletics included). Retrosheet and Baseball Reference list 23 different transactions over Newsom's long career, which will finally end in November 1953 with him posting a 211–222 record in 600 MLB games, including three 20-victory and three 20-loss seasons.
- June 19 – Carl Erskine of the Brooklyn Dodgers tosses a 5–0 no-hitter against the Chicago Cubs at Ebbets Field. Erskine will pitch his second career no-hitter on May 12, 1956 against the New York Giants, 3–0, also at Ebbets Field.
- June 20 – In a night game at Sportsman's Park, the St. Louis Browns and Washington Senators play to an 18-inning, 5–5 tie before a curfew halts the game. Satchel Paige of the Browns, age 46, throws ten shutout innings in relief. Each team has 14 hits. While the statistics will count for the players, the game will have to be replayed from scratch.
- June 22 – The Boston Braves' Sid Gordon hits a two-run homer over the left-field fence at Braves Field and wins a 100-pound bear cub as the prize for being the first Boston player to homer on "State of Maine Day". After the game, Gordon is presented with the animal in the Braves' clubhouse.
- June 23 – The fan attendance crisis suddenly plaguing minor league baseball is dramatized when the Toledo Mud Hens of the Triple-A American Association—facing bankruptcy—transfer to West Virginia in midseason and change their name to the Charleston Senators. A Toledo institution since 1916, the Mud Hens have consistently finished among the bottom three teams in the Association's standings during the post-war period and their attendance has plummeted from 234,000 in 1946 to only 99,000 in 1951.
- June 25 – At Comiskey Park, Chicago White Sox shortstop Alfonso "Chico" Carrasquel fractures his little finger during a 9–6 loss to the Washington Senators‚ which drops Chicago four games out of first place. Carrasquel will reinjure it on July 9 and be out of the lineup until August 19. The injury to Carrasquel will prove to be a key factor in the team's disappointing third-place finish. The White Sox will reacquire slick-fielding shortstop Willy Miranda from the Browns on June 28—thirteen days after they traded him—in an effort to plug the gap.
- June 27 – Eddie Sawyer, who managed the 1950 "Whiz Kid" Philadelphia Phillies to only the second pennant in club history (and first since 1915), resigns after the club's 6–0 triumph over the New York Giants at Shibe Park. Sawyer, 41, remains with the Phils as special assignment scout for owner R. R. M. Carpenter Jr. In all or parts of his five seasons as their skipper, Sawyer's Phillies went 296–292 (.503). His replacement is veteran former American League pilot Steve O'Neill, 61, who last managed the 1951 Boston Red Sox. Under O'Neill, the 1952 Phillies (now 28–35) will rally to go 59–32 (.648) to finish 87–67 and in the National League's first division.

=== July ===
- July 1 – After 18 innings of play, the Cleveland Indians and visiting St. Louis Browns remain knotted 2–2. Then, in the top off the 19th, the Browns break through to take a 3–2 lead on Jim Delsing's RBI single. But in the bottom of the 19th, the Indians re-tie the game on Al Rosen's double, then win it 4–3 on recently acquired Hank Majeski's pinch single. The decisions go to two notable pitchers: the winner, left-hander Lou Brissie, is a World War II combat veteran who wears a brace to support his badly wounded left leg; the loser, eventual Baseball Hall of Famer Satchel Page, is a 46-year-old veteran of the Negro leagues. Brissie throws ten innings of one-run relief, while Paige goes 102/3 and allows just two runs on eight hits and eight bases on balls.
- July 4
  - The standings at the end of today's holiday doubleheaders, which mark the midpoint of the MLB season, show the arch-rival Brooklyn Dodgers and New York Giants again fighting for supremacy of the National League, with Brooklyn (49–21) three games in front of the Giants (46–24). In the American League, the New York Yankees (43–28) hold a 2½-game advantage over the Chicago White Sox (43–33).
  - Not even two years removed from battling for the 1950 AL pennant, the Detroit Tigers (23–49) languish in last place in the Junior Circuit, 20½ games behind the Yankees. In response, the Tigers fire manager Red Rolfe, and replace him with an active player, 32-year-old pitcher Fred Hutchinson, who has won 95 games for Detroit over his nine years with the team. The move launches Hutchinson's 12-year career as a big-league skipper, which will include recognition as MLB Manager of the Year (1957) and a National League pennant-winning season (1961).

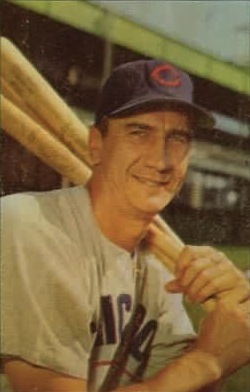
1952 NL MVP Hank Sauer

- July 8 – In a rain-shortened affair at Shibe Park, home of the Philadelphia Phillies, the National League tops the American League, 3–2 (five innings), in the All-Star Game. Jackie Robinson and Hank Sauer each homer for the NL.
- July 15
  - Detroit Tigers first baseman Walt Dropo collects seven consecutive hits over the course of doubleheader against the Washington Senators. Combined with the five consecutive hits he recorded on July 14, Dropo establishes the American League and Major League record for consecutive hits in consecutive plate appearances with twelve base hits.
  - Eddie Joost of the Philadelphia Athletics becomes the second player (after Boston's Sammy White on June 11) to hit a walk-off grand slam against St. Louis Browns pitcher Satchel Paige this season, in a 7–6 victory at Shibe Park. Paige is the first pitcher in Major League history to surrender two walk-off homers in the same season, according to the Elias Sports Bureau. Other pitchers will join Paige in the coming years: Lindy McDaniel in 1963, Lee Smith in 1995 and Francisco Rodríguez in 2009.
- July 19 – Joe Reliford, the 12-year-old batboy for the Fitzgerald Pioneers of the Class D Georgia State League, is allowed by the home-plate umpire to pinch hit in an official game; Fitzgerald is trailing 13–0 in the eighth inning at the time. After grounding out sharply to third base, Reliford plays an inning of defense in centerfield. He becomes the youngest player to ever appear in Minor League Baseball, and also breaks the color line in the segregated GSL. In the aftermath of his appearance, the league fires the umpire, Fitzgerald's manager is suspended for five games, and Reliford is relieved of his batboy job.
- July 23 – The Washington Senators, one of the surprise teams of the American League, win their ninth game of their last 11 with a 16-inning, 5–2 triumph over the Detroit Tigers at Briggs Stadium. Starting pitcher Spec Shea allows only one earned run over 14 frames before he's relieved by eventual winner Sandy Consuegra. Washington is now 50–40, in third place and only 5½ games behind the New York Yankees.
- July 28 – The Chicago White Sox and St. Louis Browns pull off a four-player waiver deal, in which the White Sox acquire catcher Darrell Johnson and outfielder Jim Rivera from St. Louis for rookie catcher Jay Porter and outfielder Ray Coleman. Porter is a 19-year-old "bonus baby" and considered a top prospect.

=== August ===
- August 3 – The woeful (28–76) Pittsburgh Pirates deal the second-place New York Giants a shocking Sunday doubleheader setback at the Polo Grounds, taking the twin bill by scores of 7–0 and 10–8 (six innings, called due to darkness). Pittsburgh's winning pitchers, Murry Dickson and Howie Pollet, are both veterans of the St. Louis Cardinals' contending teams of the 1940s. The two losses, coupled with Brooklyn's doubleheader sweep of the Chicago Cubs, drop the Giants (60–37) to 6½ games behind the front-running Dodgers.
- August 5 – Hall-of-Fame hitter Rogers Hornsby, whose departure from the St. Louis Browns' managerial job in June was controversially celebrated by his former players, gets another chance to manage in the major leagues. The Cincinnati Reds, who are 42–61 and seventh in the National League, name Hornsby, 56, the replacement for former skipper Luke Sewell, who was fired July 30. Hornsby, considered the greatest right-handed hitter in NL history (.358 lifetime batting average), coaxes the 1952 Reds to a 27–24 record through season's end. Cincinnati will be the seventh and final stop in Hornsby's MLB managerial career.
- August 8 – United States Air Force Major Bob Neighbors, a former shortstop who played six pro seasons (1936–1941)—including seven September 1939 games with the St. Louis Browns—before becoming a USAAF pilot during World War II, does not return from a bombing mission during the Korean War. Missing and presumed killed in action, Neighbors, 34, is believed to be the only MLB player who lost his life during the Korean conflict. (See Deaths entry for this date below.)
- August 10 – In his first MLB appearance, 20-year-old minor-league phenom Ron Necciai, called up by the Pittsburgh Pirates, gives up five runs in the top of the first inning to the Chicago Cubs before settling down to work six full frames. He's tagged with seven earned runs and the 9–5 loss. Necciai had gained fame May 13 by striking out 27 batters in a nine-inning game in the Class D Appalachian League, and 281 hitters in only 169 innings pitched through August 1952. He will win only one of seven MLB decisions in 12 appearances, then, plagued by ulcers, be out of baseball by 1956.
- August 14 – The two tail-enders in the American League, the seventh-place St. Louis Browns and eighth-place Detroit Tigers, exchange eight players in a late-season waiver deal. The four-for-four trade sees St. Louis send pitchers Bud Black, Ned Garver (a 20-game-winner in 1951) and Dave Madison, along with outfielder Jim Delsing, to Detroit for hurlers Dick Littlefield and Marlin Stuart and outfielders Don Lenhardt and Vic Wertz.
- August 16 – In a game that lasts only 61/3 innings before it's halted by rain, the Brooklyn Dodgers pile up 15 runs and 15 hits, put up "crooked numbers" in four innings, and blank the visiting Philadelphia Phillies, 15–0.
- August 18 – The second-place Cleveland Indians, only two games out of the American League lead, acquire relief pitcher Ted Wilks and shortstop George Strickland in a waiver deal with the Pittsburgh Pirates for infielder John Beradino, $50,000, and a "PTBNL." Wilks is one of the National League's premier relievers. Beradino, an actor as well as a ballplayer, is destined to become a daytime television star as Dr. Steve Hardy of General Hospital.

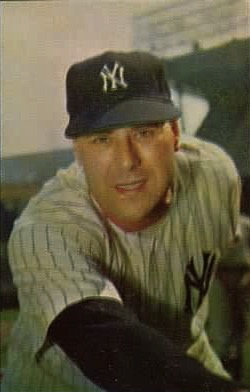
Vic Raschi

- August 23
  - Bob Elliott of the New York Giants is ejected for arguing a strike call during an at-bat against the St. Louis Cardinals at Sportsman's Park. Bobby Hofman completes Elliott's at-bat. Hofman strikes out and is also ejected for arguing.
  - The New York Yankees break a virtual tie for first place with the visiting Indians when Vic Raschi outduels future Hall-of-Famer Early Wynn 1–0. Joe Collins provides the Yanks' run with a fourth-inning double and Raschi improves his record to 15–3. The following day, the Bombers increase their margin to two games when they defeat Detroit 4–2 and Cleveland loses a marathon, 16-inning contest to Washington, 9–8.
- August 25 – Tigers pitcher Virgil Trucks fires his second no-hitter of the season, a 1–0 shutout over the host New York Yankees. Previously, Trucks held the Washington Senators without a hit on May 15. Trucks is one of five pitchers to throw two no-hitters in a season, the others being Johnny Vander Meer (1938), Allie Reynolds (1951), Nolan Ryan (1973) and Roy Halladay (2010, with one of his no-hitters coming in the postseason). Hurling for the 50–104, cellar-dwelling 1952 Tigers, Trucks will post a career-worst 5–19 won–lost record, but two of his five victories will be no-hitters and a third triumph will be a July 22 one-hitter, also against Washington.
- August 28 – The Yankees make one of their patented, pennant-drive pickups from the National League, acquiring pitcher Ewell Blackwell from the Cincinnati Reds for pitchers Ernie Nevel and Johnny Schmitz, outfielders Jim Greengrass and Bob Marquis, and $35,000. Blackwell is a six-time NL All-Star and former 22-game-winner.

=== September ===
- September 1 – With Labor Day games in the books, the home stretch of the 1952 MLB season begins with the Brooklyn Dodgers (83–42) holding a nine-game lead over the New York Giants (75–52) and the New York Yankees (77–54) up by 2½ lengths over the Cleveland Indians (75–57) in their respective leagues. The Boston Red Sox (69–59) and the surprising Philadelphia Athletics (69–61) are within shouting distance in the Junior Circuit.
- September 6 – At Shibe Park, future Hall-of-Famer Robin Roberts wins his 23rd game of 1952 and goes all 17 innings and Del Ennis hits a walk-off home run, enabling the Philadelphia Phillies to edge the Boston Braves 7–6.
- September 13 – Buffalo Bisons outfielder Frank Carswell wins the International League batting title with a .344 average, also leading the league with 30 home runs while driving in 101 runs and slugging .587.
- September 16 – In the American League's second-longest contest of 1952, the Chicago White Sox outlast the Boston Red Sox 4–3 in 17 innings. The Bosox are in the midst of a horrific 7–20 month of September that drops them two games under .500 by season's end.
- September 21
  - Mired in the midst of a ten-game losing streak, the seventh-place Boston Braves drop their final home game, 8–2, to the visiting, pennant-bound Brooklyn Dodgers to fall to a 63–85 mark. The contest is witnessed by 8,822 fans at Braves Field, bringing the year's attendance to 281,278—by far the worst in the majors (and over 237,000 fans fewer than the next-worst team, the St. Louis Browns). Few, if any, know it, but today's spectators have seen the last National League game to be played in Boston: the Braves will abruptly relocate to Milwaukee in the midst of spring training in 1953.
  - The Hollywood Stars win the 1952 Pacific Coast League title in the PCL's first season at the "Open Classification" level. One of two clubs in Los Angeles, the Stars finish third in attendance, behind the league-leading Angels and the Portland Beavers. Its "Open" designation, intended to help the PCL attain major-league status, will last through 1957, when the Dodgers and Giants invade California.
- September 23 – The Brooklyn Dodgers (95–54) clinch their ninth-ever National League championship (since 1890), coming back from a 4–1 deficit to edge the Philadelphia Phillies 5–4 in the first game of an Ebbets Field double-header. Johnny Rutherford is the unsung hero, throwing a complete game in what will be his final regular-season MLB appearance.
- September 26 – The New York Yankees (94–58) clinch their fourth straight American League pennant, defeating the Philadelphia Athletics in 11 innings, 5–2, at Shibe Park. Billy Martin's RBI single is the winning blow. It's the Bombers' 19th AL flag in the past 32 seasons. They will face the Brooklyn Dodgers for the fourth time since 1941 in the 1952 World Series.
- September 27
  - At Ebbets Field, rookie third baseman Eddie Mathews of the Boston Braves slugs three home runs in his club's penultimate game, leading Boston to an 11–3 victory. Mathews, 21, will earn a place in the Baseball Hall of Fame, belting 512 career homers in a 17-year career; he will also be known as the only man to play for the Braves in Boston (1952), Milwaukee (1953–1965) and Atlanta (1966).
  - Billy Meyer, manager of the Pittsburgh Pirates since 1948, announces he will retire after the season "for a healthier job." Meyer, 59, won the 1948 The Sporting News Manager of the Year Award, but his 1952 team is on the verge of a 42–112 debacle. He remains with the Pirates as a scout until his 1957 death, with the team retiring his uniform #1 in 1954.

=== October ===
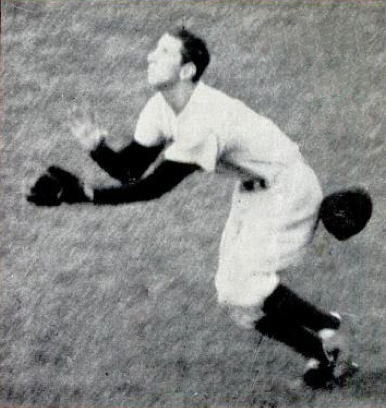
Billy Martin's Series-saving, Game 7 catch

- October 1 – In Game 1 of the 1952 World Series, the Brooklyn Dodgers defeat the New York Yankees, 4–2, at Ebbets Field behind relief ace Joe Black, who started only two games during the regular season.
- October 7 – The New York Yankees defeat the Brooklyn Dodgers, 4–2, in the decisive Game 7 of the World Series to win their fourth straight World Championship title – tying the mark they set between 1936 and 1939 and fifteenth overall. Billy Martin saves the day by snaring a two-out, bases-loaded infield pop off the bat of Jackie Robinson. Gil Hodges goes hitless again and is 0-for-21 in the Series. This is the Yankees' third defeat of the Dodgers in six years.
- October 14
  - The Cincinnati Reds obtain centerfielder Gus Bell from the Pittsburgh Pirates for catcher Joe Rossi and outfielders Cal Abrams and Gail Henley. Bell will thrive in Cincinnati, making four National League All-Star teams and slugging 160 home runs over nine seasons.
  - The Brooklyn Dodgers trade slick-fielding minor-league shortstop Billy Hunter to the St. Louis Browns for pitcher Bob Mahoney, shortstop Stan Rojek, outfielder Ray Coleman, and $95,000.
- October 15 – The Boston Red Sox remove player-manager Lou Boudreau from their active roster, enabling him to better focus on his managerial duties. Boudreau will remain at the Bosox' helm for two more seasons. His unconditional release ends the playing career of the former star shortstop and playing skipper of the Cleveland Indians, a future Baseball Hall of Famer.
- October 30 – The St. Louis Cardinals release longtime star left-hander Harry Brecheen, a two-time NL All-Star and hero of the 1946 World Series. Brecheen is immediately named a playing pitching coach by the American League St. Louis Browns.

=== November ===
- November 12 – Bobby Shantz, who posted a 24–7 record with 152 strikeouts and a 2.48 ERA for the Philadelphia Athletics, is selected the American League Most Valuable Player by the Baseball Writers' Association of America and the AL Pitcher of the Year by The Sporting News.
- November 20 – Hank Sauer, slugging outfielder of the Chicago Cubs who is nicknamed "The Mayor of Wrigley Field," wins the 1952 National League Most Valuable Player Award. Sauer, 35, tied Ralph Kiner for the Senior Circuit's home-run crown, with 37 blasts, and led the NL in RBI (121).
- November 21 – Joe Black, who posted a 15–4 record, 2.15 earned run average, and 15 saves for the pennant-winning Brooklyn Dodgers, wins the National League Rookie of the Year Award.
- November 22 – Philadelphia Athletics pitcher Harry Byrd, who won 15 games and posted and a 3.31 ERA, is selected American League Rookie of the Year. Byrd will be the last Athletics player to win the award until Jose Canseco in 1986.
- November 28 – International League president Frank Shaughnessy reveals plans to form two new major leagues by merging the top teams in the American Association and the top teams from the IL. Shaughnessy thinks that in five to six years, Major League Baseball will elevate these two leagues, along with the Pacific Coast League, which nearly has MLB status now.
- November 30 – On a local New York TV program, Jackie Robinson of the Brooklyn Dodgers charges that the New York Yankees management is racist for its failure to bring up a black player. Yankees executive George Weiss denies the allegations.

=== December ===
- December 2 – The Pittsburgh Pirates draft relief pitcher Elroy Face from the Montreal Royals, the top minor league affiliate of the Brooklyn Dodgers. During a 15-year career with the Pirates, Face will lead the National League in saves three times and will be a three-time All-Star, as well as his amazing 18 relief wins in 1959 remains a major league record.
- December 4
  - The Detroit Tigers trade hard-throwing pitcher Virgil Trucks, fellow right-hander Hal White and outfielder Johnny Groth to the St. Louis Browns for catcher Jay Porter, infielder Owen Friend and outfielder Bob Nieman. Trucks, an 11-year Tiger veteran, threw two no-hitters in 1952 but posted only a 5–19 (3.97 ERA) record for the last-place Bengals.
  - Brooklyn Dodgers' vice president Buzzie Bavasi dismisses the New York Yankees' reaction to the Jackie Robinson racism charges. Commissioner Ford Frick plans no action against Robinson. Two days earlier, Robinson had called the Yankees a racist organization for its failure to promote a black player to the parent club.
- December 10 – The Washington Senators acquire left-hander Chuck Stobbs from the Chicago White Sox for righty hurler Mike Fornieles.
- December 11 – The Pittsburgh Pirates fill their managerial vacancy by promoting Fred Haney, 56, from the Hollywood Stars of the Pacific Coast League. Haney will fail to lift the Bucs out of the National League basement, going 163–299 (.353) over three seasons.

== Movies ==
- The Pride of St. Louis
- The Winning Team

== Births ==
=== January ===
- January 2 – Greg Heydeman
- January 6 – Bob Adams
- January 7
  - Doug Capilla
  - Bob Gorinski
- January 9
  - Don Hopkins
  - Joe Wallis
- January 13 – Bob Galasso
- January 14
  - Terry Forster
  - Wayne Gross
- January 17
  - Pete LaCock
  - Darrell Porter
- January 21 – Mike Krukow
- January 22 – Ramón Avilés
- January 24 – John Scott
- January 26 – Morris Nettles

=== February ===
- February 2 – Warren Brusstar
- February 3 – Fred Lynn
- February 14 – Will McEnaney
- February 16
  - Barry Foote
  - Jerry Hairston, Sr.
- February 18 – Marc Hill
- February 19 – Dave Cheadle
- February 26 – Dennis Kinney
- February 27 – Henry Cruz
- February 28 – Orlando Álvarez
- February 29 – Al Autry

=== March ===
- March 1 – Bob Davis
- March 5 – Mike Squires
- March 6 – Eduardo Rodríguez
- March 15 – Steve Stroughter
- March 17 – Jerry Tabb
- March 19 – Perry Hill
- March 20
  - Rick Langford
  - Greg Terlecky
- March 21 – Fernando Arroyo
- March 22
  - Eddie Bane
  - Eric Rasmussen
- March 29 – Bill Castro

=== April ===
- April 1 – Mike Bacsik
- April 6 – Steve Waterbury
- April 9 – Ed Plank
- April 20 – Joe Gilbert
- April 24 – Pat Zachry
- April 29
  - Bob McClure
  - Ron Washington

=== May ===
- May 1 – Bob Allietta
- May 4 – Fred Andrews
- May 9 – Sam Mejías
- May 15 – Rick Waits
- May 17 – Porfi Altamirano
- May 19 – Dan Ford
- May 23
  - Pepe Mangual
  - Butch Metzger
- May 29 – Fred Holdsworth
- May 31 – Dwight Bernard

=== June ===
- June 2 – Mike Davey
- June 13 – Ernie Whitt
- June 21 – Dave Downs
- June 22 – Randy Scarbery
- June 26 – Steve Bowling
- June 28 – Joe Sambito

=== July ===
- July 1 – Kerry Dineen
- July 3
  - Ryan Kurosaki
  - John Verhoeven
- July 5 – Don DeMola
- July 6 – Cardell Camper
- July 21 – Steve Smith
- July 24 – Jerry Augustine
- July 27
  - Rich Dauer
  - Bump Wills
- July 30 – Mickey Mahler

=== August ===
- August 1 – Greg Gross
- August 2
  - Art James
  - Bombo Rivera
- August 3
  - Bob Davidson
  - Dan Meyer
- August 8
  - Mike Ivie
  - Greg Mahlberg
- August 16 – Al Holland
- August 19 – Tim Blackwell
- August 20
  - Bobby Cuellar
  - Lance Rautzhan
- August 21 – Chip Lang
- August 22 – Gary Beare
- August 23 – Jerry White
- August 27
  - Marshall Edwards
  - Mike Edwards

=== September ===
- September 2 – Nate Snell
- September 7 – Rick Sweet
- September 8 – Larry McCall
- September 9 – Jerry Mumphrey
- September 15 – Don Collins
- September 18 – Sam Bowen
- September 20 – Jim Wilhelm
- September 21
  - Art Gardner
  - Gary Gray
- September 22 – Dell Alston
- September 23
  - Dennis Lamp
  - Jim Morrison
  - Pat Scanlon
- September 24 – Rod Gilbreath
- September 25
  - Sal Butera
  - Mike Stanton

=== October ===
- October 1 – Bob Myrick
- October 2 – Terry Cornutt
- October 7 – John Caneira
- October 18
  - Allen Ripley
  - Jerry Royster
- October 20 – Dave Collins
- October 23
  - John Poff
  - Randy Tate
- October 24
  - Omar Moreno
  - Angel Torres
  - Reggie Walton
- October 25
  - Rowland Office
  - Roy Smalley
- October 27
  - Gil Flores
  - Bill Travers
  - Pete Vuckovich
- October 30 – Tom Brennan
- October 31 – Joe West

=== November ===
- November 4 – Doug Corbett
- November 5 – Tom Carroll
- November 8
  - John Denny
  - Jerry Remy
- November 9
  - Jim Riggleman
  - Dave Wehrmeister
  - Rick Williams
- November 13 – John Sutton
- November 15 – Tom Donohue
- November 16 – Glenn Burke
- November 17 – Dave Frost
- November 18
  - Dan Briggs
  - Steve Henderson
- November 21 – Bill Almon

=== December ===
- December 1 – Dan Warthen
- December 3 – Larry Anderson
- December 6
  - Chuck Baker
  - Jeff Schneider
- December 9 – Bruce Boisclair
- December 11 – Rob Andrews
- December 15 – Bud Bulling
- December 16 – Tommy Bianco
- December 21 – Joaquín Andújar
- December 23 – Santo Alcalá
- December 25 – Julio González
- December 27
  - Mark Budaska
  - Craig Reynolds
- December 28
  - Ray Knight
  - José Sosa
- December 29 – Dennis Werth

== Deaths ==
=== January ===
- January 6 – Frank Oberlin, 75, pitcher who played for the Boston Americans and Washington Senators over four seasons spanning 1906–1910.
- January 8 – Art Evans, 40, pitcher for the 1932 Chicago White Sox.
- January 10 – Bones Ely, 88, one of the top defensive shortstops of his generation and also a versatile two-way player, whose 19-season professional career included stints with eight major league teams in three different leagues in a span of fourteen seasons between 1884 and 1902.
- January 14 – Rube Sellers, 70, outfielder who played for the Boston Doves in its 1910 season.
- January 15 – Ben Houser, 68, first baseman who played with the Philadelphia Athletics during the 1910 season, and for the Boston Rustlers and Braves from 1911 to 1912.
- January 17
  - Walter O. Briggs Sr., 74, industrialist and co-owner of the Detroit Tigers from 1919 to 1935, and sole owner from 1935 until his death.
  - Solly Salisbury, 75, pitcher who played in 1902 with the Philadelphia Phillies.
- January 20 – Ollie Pickering, 81, outfielder for six major league clubs in three different leagues between 1896 and 1908, who entered the record books as the first ever batter in American League history, when he faced Chicago White Sox pitcher Roy Patterson as a member of the Cleveland Blues on April 24, 1901.
- January 24
  - Ángel Aragón, 61, third baseman for the New York Yankees in three seasons from 1914 to 1917, who was also the first Cuban and Latin American player to wear a Yankees uniform.
  - Dick Wright, 61, catcher who made four game appearances for the Brooklyn Tip-Tops of the outlaw Federal League in 1915.

=== February ===
- February 5
  - Esty Chaney, 61, pitcher who played from 1913 to 1914 for the Boston Red Sox (1913) and Brooklyn Tip-Tops.
  - Mike Hopkins, 79, catcher who appeared in just one game for the Pittsburgh Pirates in 1902, hitting a single and one double in two at-bats to finish his major league career with a 1.000 batting average and a 1.500 slugging percentage.
- February 6 – Del Paddock, 64, third baseman who divided his playing time between the Chicago White Sox and the New York Highlanders in the 1912 season.
- February 12 – Charlie Manlove, 89, 19th century catcher who played in 1884 for the Altoona Mountain City of the Union Association and the New York Gothams of the National League.

=== March ===
- March 11 – Pete Daglia, 46, pitcher for the 1932 Chicago White Sox.
- March 13 – Vincent Maney, 65, shortstop for the Detroit Tigers in the 1912 season.
- March 19 – Lefty Thomas, 48, pitcher who played in eight games in 1925 and 1926 for the Washington Senators.
- March 20 – Harry Bay, 74, outfielder for the Cincinnati Reds and the Cleveland Bronchos and Naps in a span of eight seasons from 1901 to 1908, who led the American League in stolen bases in 1903 and 1904.
- March 23 – Steve Sundra, 41, pitcher for the New York Yankees, Washington Senators and St. Louis Browns over eight seasons spanning 1936–1946, as well as a member of the 1938 and 1939 World Series champion Yankees teams.
- March 30
  - John Gallagher, 60, second baseman who played in 1915 for the Baltimore Terrapins of the Federal League.
  - Deacon Phillippe, 79, pitcher who played for the Louisville Colonels in 1899 and for the Pittsburgh Pirates from 1900 through 1911, whose 13-season career was highlighted by pitching a no-hitter in his seventh career game with the Colonels, winning four National League pennants and the 1909 World Series with the Pirates, while winning three games of the 1903 World Series against the eventual champions Boston Americans, and prevailing in a pitching duel with Cy Young in Game 1 of the best-of-nine series, as his five decisions in the World Series are still a record for a pitcher.

=== April ===
- April 3
  - Dick Harley, 79, left fielder who played from 1897 through 1903 for the St. Louis Browns, Cleveland Spiders, Cincinnati Reds, Detroit Tigers and Chicago Cubs.
  - Phenomenal Smith, 87, whose pitching career lasted eight seasons from 1884 to 1891 while playing for six different clubs, as he earned the sumptuous nickname when he pitched a no-hitter for the Newark Domestics of the American Association on October 3, 1885, in which he struck out 16 Baltimore Orioles batters.
- April 5 – Ray Jacobs, 50, infielder who made two pinch-hit appearances for the Chicago Cubs in its 1918 season.
- April 8 – Willie Ludolph, 52, pitcher for the 1924 Detroit Tigers.
- April 21 – Sheldon Lejeune, 68, outfielder who played with the Brooklyn Dodgers in 1911 and for the Pittsburgh Pirates in 1915.
- April 30 – Frank Madden, 59, catcher who played in two games for the Pittsburgh Rebels in 1914.

=== May ===
- May 1 – Ernie Johnson, 64, middle infielder and third baseman whose 10-year career included stints with four teams from 1912 to 1925, being also a contributor to the 1923 World Series Champion Yankees, slashing.297/.333/.385 for the club in the regular season, and scoring the series-deciding run as a pinch runner in Game 6 against the New York Giants.
- May 4 – Burt Keeley, 72, pitcher for the Washington Senators in the 1908 and 1909 seasons.
- May 6
  - Rube Dessau, 69, pitcher who played with the Boston Doves in 1907 and for the Brooklyn Superbas in 1910.
  - Harry Berte, 79, middle infielder for the 1903 St. Louis Cardinals.
- May 7 – Red Bluhm, 57, slick fielding first baseman in the minor leagues, who made one appearance as a pinch hitter for the Boston Red Sox in 1918.
- May 12 – Charlie Young, 59, pitcher who played for the Baltimore Terrapins of the outlaw Federal League in 1915.
- May 14
  - Bert Cunningham, 86, pitcher who played from 1887 through 1901 for the Brooklyn Grays, Baltimore Orioles, Philadelphia Athletics, Buffalo Bisons, Louisville Colonels and Chicago Orphans,
  - Red Dooin, 72, catcher (1902–1914) and player-manager (1910–1914) for the Philadelphia Phillies who caught 1,219 games for the team and posted a record of 392–370 (.514) as its skipper; also played for the Cincinnati Reds (1915) and New York Giants (1915–1916).
- May 16 – Sal Campfield, 52, pitcher who played for the New York Giants in its 1896 season.
- May 18 – Spec Harkness, 64, pitcher who played from 1910 to 1911 for the Cleveland Naps.
- May 23 – Bill McGilvray, 69, outfielder for the 1908 Cincinnati Reds.
- May 27 – Lew Ritter, 76, catcher who played for the Brooklyn Superbas over seven seasons from 1902 to 1908.
- May 29 – Doc Lavan, 61, shortstop whose 16-year pro career included stints in the major leagues with the St. Louis Browns, Philadelphia Athletics, Washington Senators and St. Louis Cardinals in a span of twelve seasons from 1913 to 1924.
- May 30 – Albert Lasker, 72, advertising executive and owner or part-owner of the Chicago Cubs between 1916 and 1925.

=== June ===
- June 5 – Bruno Haas, 61, pitcher for the 1915 Philadelphia Athletics.
- June 9 – Bob McHale, 82, 19th century pitcher who played for the Washington Senators of the National League in 1898.
- June 17
  - Al Atkinson, 91, pitcher who played for the Philadelphia Athletics, Chicago Browns and Baltimore Monumentals in 1884 and again with Philadelphia from 1886 to 1887; one of the few pitchers to throw two no-hitters in the early days of baseball, first against the Pittsburgh Alleghenys on May 24, 1884, and the second on May 1, 1886, against the New York Metropolitans, but achieved prominence in 1888 when he set a season record with 307 strikeouts in the International Association, a mark that stood until 1923, when Lefty Grove broke it with 320 SO while pitching for the Baltimore Orioles in the then International League.
  - Julio Bonetti, 40, pitcher who played for the St. Louis Browns and Chicago Cubs over part of three seasons spanning 1937–1940, one of only seven Italian-born players in Major League Baseball history.
- June 19 – Dick Crutcher, 62, pitcher for the Boston Braves in part of two seasons from 1914 to 1915.
- June 20 – John Kalahan, 73, catcher who appeared in one game with the Philadelphia Athletics during the 1903 season.
- June 21 – Andy Dunning, 80, 19th century pitcher who played with the Pittsburgh Alleghenys in 1889 and for the New York Giants in 1891.

=== July ===
- July 3 – Fred Tenney, 80, first baseman and manager whose career lasted 17 seasons from 1894 to 1911, who was ranked behind only Hal Chase among first basemen of the Deadball Era, being also considered the originator of the 3-6-3 double play, while leading the National League in putouts in 1905 and 1907–1908 as well as in assists each year from 1901 through 1907, setting a major-league record with 152 in 1905 that lasted until Mickey Vernon topped it in 1949, hitting over .300 seven times and retiring with a .294/.371/.358 slash line, including 2,231 hits, 1,134 runs scored and 688 runs batted in.
- July 11 – Dutch Leonard, 60, left-handed pitcher for the Boston Red Sox and Detroit Tigers over eleven seasons from 1913 to 1925, who earned two World Series rings with Boston in 1915 and 1916, while leading the major leagues with an earned run average of 0.96 in 1914, setting a modern-era season record that still stands.

=== August ===
- August 1 – Phil Douglas, 62, hard-throwing pitcher who posted a 94–93 record and 2.80 earned run average for five teams in a nine-year career, winning 15 games with a 2.08 ERA in the 1921 season and then two wins in the 1921 World Series to help the New York Giants win the series, going 11–4 with a National League leading 2.63 ERA in 1922, before being banned for life under Commissioner Landis due to a quarrel with Giants manager John McGraw.
- August 8 – Bob Neighbors, 34, shortstop for the 1939 St. Louis Browns, who later served as a pilot in the Korean War and was shot down, making him the most recent major leaguer to be killed in battle.
- August 13 – Hal Haid, 54, relief pitcher who played with the St. Louis Browns, St. Louis Cardinals, Boston Braves and Chicago White Sox over parts of six seasons spanning 1919–1933.
- August 19 – George McAvoy, 68, pinch hitter who appeared in one game with the 1914 Philadelphia Phillies.
- August 20
  - Red Owens, 77, second baseman who played in 1899 with the Philadelphia Phillies and for the Brooklyn Superbas in 1905.
  - Ned Pettigrew, 71, who pinch-hit in two games for the Buffalo Blues of the outlaw Federal League in 1914.
- August 21 – Jack Ryan, 83, big league catcher who played from 1889 through 1913 for six clubs in three different leagues, completing a career that lasted four decades, a feat which has been attained by only 29 players in Major League history.
- August 25 – Harry Maupin, 80, 19th century pitcher who played in 1898 with the St. Louis Browns and for the Cleveland Spiders in 1899.
- August 30 – Arky Vaughan, 40, Hall of Fame and nine-time All-Star shortstop, who hit .300 or better in each of his first 10 major league seasons, all with the Pittsburgh Pirates from 1932 to 1941, winning the National League batting crown with a .385 average in 1935, while leading the league in runs and triples three years apiece, as well as stolen bases once; died tragically when a sudden storm capsized his fishing boat on Lost Lake, near his Northern California home.

=== September ===
- September 3 – Bert Daly, 71, backup infielder for the 1903 Philadelphia Athletics.
- September 4 – Butch Schmidt, 66, first baseman who played for the New York Highlanders and Boston Braves in a span of four seasons from 1909 to 1915, being also a member of the 1914 Miracle Braves, the first MLB club ever to win a World Series in just four games.
- September 8 – Ed Hearne, 64, shortstop who played briefly with the Boston Red Sox in 1910.
- September 13 – Al Clauss, 61, pitcher for the 1913 Detroit Tigers.
- September 16 – Earl Sheely, 59, first baseman who posted a .300 batting average with the Chicago White Sox, Pittsburgh Pirates and Boston Braves in nine seasons between 1921 and 1931, serving later as a scout for the Boston Red Sox and general manager for the Triple-A Seattle Rainiers, earning a Pacific Coast League Hall of Fame induction for his contributions to the league over the years.
- September 28 – Zeke Wrigley, 78, 19th century shortstop who played from 1896 through 1899 for the Washington Senators, New York Giants and Brooklyn Superbas.
- September 30 – Jerry Freeman, 72, first baseman for the Washington Senators from 1908 to 1909.

=== October ===
- October 4 – Bill Zimmerman, 65, German outfielder who played for the Brooklyn Robins in 1915.
- October 8 – Joe Adams, 74, pitcher for the 1902 St. Louis Cardinals, who later became a successful manager in the minor leagues, being a mentor for future Hall of Famers Frank Chance and Ray Schalk, among others, while earning the nickname of Godfather of the Eastern Illinois League, according to the 1908 Spalding Guide.
- October 11 – Roy Beecher, 68, pitcher for the New York Giants from 1907 to 1908.
- October 14 – Jim Banning, 87, 19th century catcher who played for the Washington Nationals of the National League in parts of two seasonsd from 1888 to 1889.
- October 17 – Vince Shields, 51, Canadian pitcher for the 1924 St. Louis Cardinals.
- October 22 – Howard McGraner, 63, pitcher who played with the Cincinnati Reds in 1912.
- October 26
  - Tom Angley, 48, backup catcher for the Chicago Cubs in its 1929 season.
  - Mike Murphy, 64, catcher who played with the St. Louis Cardinals in 1912 and for the Philadelphia Athletics in 1916.
- October 28 – Bob Lawson, 77, pitcher who played with the Boston Beaneaters in 1901 and for the original Baltimore Orioles in 1902.

=== November ===
- November 1
  - Wally Clement, 72, outfielder who played in 1908 with the Philadelphia Phillies, and for the Brooklyn Superbas in 1909.
  - Ed McNichol, 73, pitcher for the 1904 Boston Beaneaters.
- November 3 – Frank Smith, 73, pitcher who played for the Chicago White Sox, Boston Red Sox, Cincinnati Reds, Baltimore Terrapins and Brooklyn Tip-Tops during 11 seasons spanning 1904–1915, while pitching two no-hitters and winning over 20 games twice, ending his career with a 139–111 record and 2.59 ERA in 2,274 innings.
- November 20 – Fred McMullin, best known for his involvement in the 1919 World Series Black Sox Scandal, died in Los Angeles, California, at the age of 61. McMullin, a reserve infielder with the Chicago White Sox, was one of the eight White Sox players that were banned from baseball for gambling on the series, won by the Cincinnati Reds. McMullin began his major league career in 1914, as a shortstop for the Detroit Tigers before making the Chicago club in 1916. Afterwards, he was a member of the 1917 World Series Champion White Sox. In his final years, he suffered from arteriosclerosis, a heart ailment. Just over a month after his 61st birthday, he had a stroke that caused hemorrhaging in the brain and died a day later.
- November 26 – Warren Gill, 73, first baseman who played for the Pittsburgh Pirates in its 1908 season.
- November 29 – Arlie Latham, 92, "The Freshest Man on Earth", who played for the Buffalo Bisons, St. Louis Browns, Chicago Pirates, Cincinnati Reds, Washington Senators and New York Giants in a span of 17 seasons from 1880 to 1909; known for his practical jokes and setting the MLB career record to date for the most errors at third base, with 822, while ranking seventh on the all-time list for stolen bases with 742, ending his career with a .269 batting average, 1,478 runs scored, 836 hits, 27 home runs and 563 and runs batted in.

=== December ===
- December 6 – Don Hurst, 47, first baseman who played from 1928 through 1934 for the Philadelphia Phillies and Chicago Cubs, leading the National League with 143 RBI in 1932.
- December 14 – Frank Hansford, 77, pitcher for the 1898 Brooklyn Bridegrooms.
- December 28 – Deacon Jones, 60, pitcher who played from 1916 to 1918 for the Detroit Tigers.
- December 29 – Bob Meinke, 65, shortstop who appeared in two games for the Cincinnati Reds in 1910.
