= 1952 Philadelphia Phillies season =

1952 Philadelphia Phillies
- League: National League
- Ballpark: Shibe Park
- City: Philadelphia
- Owners: R. R. M. Carpenter, Jr.
- General managers: R. R. M. Carpenter, Jr.
- Managers: Eddie Sawyer, Steve O'Neill
- Television: WPTZ; WCAU; WFIL
- Radio: WPEN (Gene Kelly, Claude Haring)

The 1952 Philadelphia Phillies season was the 70th season in the history of the franchise, and the 15th season for the Philadelphia Phillies at Shibe Park.

== Offseason ==
In March 1952, during spring training, shortstop Granny Hamner was named captain of the team by manager Eddie Sawyer.

=== Notable transactions ===
- December 10, 1951: Andy Seminick, Eddie Pellagrini, Dick Sisler, and Niles Jordan were traded by the Phillies to the Cincinnati Reds for Smoky Burgess, Howie Fox and Connie Ryan.

== Regular season ==
=== Season standings ===
National League
Team	W	L	Pct.	GB	Home	Road
Brooklyn Dodgers	96	57	.627	—	45‍–‍33	51‍–‍24
New York Giants	92	62	.597	4½	50‍–‍27	42‍–‍35
St. Louis Cardinals	88	66	.571	8½	48‍–‍29	40‍–‍37
Philadelphia Phillies	87	67	.565	9½	47‍–‍29	40‍–‍38
Chicago Cubs	77	77	.500	19½	42‍–‍35	35‍–‍42
Cincinnati Reds	69	85	.448	27½	38‍–‍39	31‍–‍46
Boston Braves	64	89	.418	32	31‍–‍45	33‍–‍44
Pittsburgh Pirates	42	112	.273	54½	23‍–‍54	19‍–‍58

=== Record vs. opponents ===
1952 National League record Sources:
Team	BSN	BRO	CHC	CIN	NYG	PHI	PIT	STL
Boston	—	3–18–1	12–10	9–13	9–13	9–13	15–7–1	7–15
Brooklyn	18–3–1	—	13–9–1	17–5	8–14	10–12	19–3	11–11
Chicago	10–12	9–13–1	—	13–9	10–12	10–12	14–8	11–11
Cincinnati	13–9	5–17	9–13	—	6–16	10–12	16–6	10–12
New York	13–9	14–8	12–10	16–6	—	10–12	15–7	12–10
Philadelphia	13–9	12–10	12–10	12–10	12–10	—	16–6	10–12
Pittsburgh	7–15–1	3–19	8–14	6–16	7–15	6–16	—	5–17
St. Louis	15–7	11–11	11–11	12–10	10–12	12–10	17–5	—

=== Notable transactions ===
- April 29, 1952: John Anderson was signed as an amateur free agent by the Phillies.
- May 23, 1952: Bubba Church was traded by the Phillies to the Cincinnati Reds for Kent Peterson and Johnny Wyrostek.
- August 30, 1952: Tommy Glaviano was selected off waivers by the Phillies from the St. Louis Cardinals.

=== Game log ===
Legend
	Phillies win
	Phillies loss
	Postponement
**Bold**	Phillies team member

1952 Game Log
Overall Record: 87–67
April (4–7)

#	Date	Opponent	Score	Win	Loss	Save	Attendance	Record
–	April 15	@ Giants	Postponed (rain); Makeup: September 4					
1	April 16	@ Giants	3–5	Sal Maglie (1–0)	**Robin Roberts** (0–1)	None	17,472	0–1
2	April 17	@ Giants	5–3 (11)	**Jim Konstanty** (1–0)	George Spencer (0–1)	None	13,697	1–1
3	April 18	Braves	2–3	Lew Burdette (1–0)	**Russ Meyer** (0–1)	None	15,911	1–2
4	April 19	Braves	7–9	Bert Thiel (1–0)	**Andy Hansen** (0–1)	Lew Burdette (1)	9,466	1–3
5	April 20 (1)	Braves	4–3 (10)	**Robin Roberts** (1–1)	Lew Burdette (1–1)	None	see 2nd game	2–3
6	April 20 (2)	Braves	1–2	Dave Cole (1–0)	**Karl Drews** (0–1)	Dick Donovan (1)	26,011	2–4
7	April 21	Giants	4–10	Jim Hearn (1–0)	**Howie Fox** (0–1)	Dave Koslo (1)	14,609	2–5
8	April 22	Giants	1–4	Larry Jansen (1–0)	**Russ Meyer** (0–2)	None	12,405	2–6
–	April 23	Dodgers	Postponed (rain); Makeup: August 9 as a traditional double-header					
–	April 24	Dodgers	Postponed (rain); Makeup: August 11 as a traditional double-header					
–	April 25	@ Braves	Postponed (rain); Makeup: July 3					
9	April 26	@ Braves	8–0	**Robin Roberts** (2–1)	Vern Bickford (0–1)	None	1,893	3–6
–	April 27 (1)	@ Braves	Postponed (rain); Makeup: August 5 as a traditional double-header					
–	April 27 (2)	@ Braves	Postponed (rain); Makeup: August 6 as a traditional double-header					
10	April 29	@ Cubs	8–2	**Curt Simmons** (1–0)	Bob Rush (1–2)	None	8,484	4–6
11	April 30	@ Cubs	8–9 (12)	Dutch Leonard (1–0)	**Howie Fox** (0–2)	None	7,221	4–7

May (13–13)

#	Date	Opponent	Score	Win	Loss	Save	Attendance	Record
12	May 1	@ Cardinals	6–3	**Robin Roberts** (3–1)	Cliff Chambers (1–1)	None	5,596	5–7
13	May 2	@ Cardinals	2–3	Vinegar Bend Mizell (1–2)	**Russ Meyer** (0–3)	None	9,462	5–8
14	May 3	@ Cardinals	0–3	Cloyd Boyer (1–0)	**Karl Drews** (0–2)	None	5,676	5–9
15	May 4 (1)	@ Reds	4–5	Ewell Blackwell (1–3)	**Curt Simmons** (1–1)	Frank Smith (3)	see 2nd game	5–10
16	May 4 (2)	@ Reds	7–8	Harry Perkowski (2–1)	**Howie Fox** (0–3)	Frank Smith (4)	19,780	5–11
17	May 6	@ Pirates	6–0	**Robin Roberts** (4–1)	Don Carlsen (0–1)	None	9,008	6–11
18	May 7	@ Pirates	1–5	Howie Pollet (1–3)	**Russ Meyer** (0–4)	None	7,291	6–12
–	May 8	@ Pirates	Postponed (rain, wet grounds); Makeup: July 17 as a traditional double-header					
19	May 10 (1)	@ Dodgers	4–0	**Karl Drews** (1–2)	Ralph Branca (2–2)	None	see 2nd game	7–12
20	May 10 (2)	@ Dodgers	8–1	**Robin Roberts** (5–1)	Clem Labine (0–1)	None	31,777	8–12
21	May 11	@ Dodgers	3–4 (10)	Carl Erskine (2–0)	**Howie Fox** (0–4)	None	9,104	8–13
–	May 12	@ Dodgers	Postponed (cold, wet grounds); Makeup: July 2 as a traditional double-header					
22	May 13	Cubs	6–0	**Curt Simmons** (2–1)	Joe Hatten (2–2)	None	5,702	9–13
23	May 14	Cubs	9–2	**Russ Meyer** (1–4)	Bob Kelly (1–3)	None	3,212	10–13
24	May 15	Reds	5–1	**Robin Roberts** (6–1)	Ewell Blackwell (1–5)	None	14,752	11–13
25	May 16	Reds	3–2 (10)	**Ken Heintzelman** (1–0)	Herm Wehmeier (3–2)	None	19,313	12–13
26	May 17	Reds	3–7	Frank Hiller (4–2)	**Howie Fox** (0–5)	None	5,285	12–14
27	May 18	Cardinals	3–4	Gerry Staley (7–1)	**Russ Meyer** (1–5)	Al Brazle (6)	12,380	12–15
–	May 19	Cardinals	Postponed (rain); Makeup: June 17 as a traditional double-header					
–	May 20	Pirates	Postponed (rain); Makeup: June 16					
28	May 21	Pirates	7–3	**Robin Roberts** (7–1)	Murry Dickson (1–7)	None	6,202	13–15
29	May 22	Pirates	6–0	**Curt Simmons** (3–1)	Red Munger (0–2)	None	3,065	14–15
30	May 23	Dodgers	1–5	Ben Wade (3–1)	**Karl Drews** (1–3)	None	30,323	14–16
31	May 24	Dodgers	0–5	Billy Loes (5–0)	**Russ Meyer** (1–6)	None	15,894	14–17
–	May 25	Dodgers	Postponed (rain); Makeup: September 2					
–	May 26	Braves	Postponed (rain); Makeup: May 27 as a traditional double-header					
32	May 27 (1)	Braves	2–4 (12)	Warren Spahn (4–3)	**Ken Heintzelman** (1–1)	Lew Burdette (4)	see 2nd game	14–18
33	May 27 (2)	Braves	5–4 (10)	**Andy Hansen** (1–1)	Sheldon Jones (0–1)	None	27,225	15–18
34	May 29	Giants	6–5	**Karl Drews** (2–3)	Hoyt Wilhelm (4–1)	**Ken Heintzelman** (1)	3,919	16–18
35	May 30 (1)	Giants	3–0	**Russ Meyer** (2–6)	Max Lanier (1–3)	None	see 2nd game	17–18
36	May 30 (2)	Giants	2–4	Larry Jansen (4–1)	**Robin Roberts** (7–2)	None	31,273	17–19
37	May 31	@ Pirates	3–5	Joe Muir (2–1)	**Lou Possehl** (0–1)	Woody Main (1)	6,425	17–20

June (13–16)

#	Date	Opponent	Score	Win	Loss	Save	Attendance	Record
38	June 1 (1)	@ Pirates	5–1	**Curt Simmons** (4–1)	Murry Dickson (2–8)	None	see 2nd game	18–20
39	June 1 (2)	@ Pirates	1–2	Ted Wilks (2–2)	**Karl Drews** (2–4)	None	15,529	18–21
40	June 3	@ Reds	1–2	Frank Smith (2–1)	**Robin Roberts** (7–3)	None	6,441	18–22
41	June 4	@ Reds	8–10	Frank Smith (3–1)	**Ken Heintzelman** (1–2)	None	6,075	18–23
42	June 5	@ Reds	3–5	Harry Perkowski (5–2)	**Karl Drews** (2–5)	None	2,459	18–24
43	June 6	@ Cardinals	4–5	Al Brazle (3–0)	**Jim Konstanty** (1–1)	None	7,512	18–25
44	June 7	@ Cardinals	4–3	**Jim Konstanty** (2–1)	Bill Werle (0–1)	None	10,391	19–25
45	June 8	@ Cardinals	3–5	Willard Schmidt (1–2)	**Russ Meyer** (2–7)	Eddie Yuhas (1)	10,399	19–26
46	June 10	@ Cubs	5–10	Paul Minner (6–1)	**Karl Drews** (2–6)	None	10,125	19–27
47	June 11	@ Cubs	2–3	Turk Lown (3–2)	**Curt Simmons** (4–2)	Dutch Leonard (3)	10,765	19–28
48	June 12	@ Cubs	1–3	Warren Hacker (4–1)	**Robin Roberts** (7–4)	None	9,646	19–29
49	June 14	Pirates	4–2	**Russ Meyer** (3–7)	Bob Friend (3–8)	**Jim Konstanty** (1)	5,033	20–29
50	June 15 (1)	Pirates	0–6	Howie Pollet (2–7)	**Karl Drews** (2–7)	None	see 2nd game	20–30
51	June 15 (2)	Pirates	6–3	**Howie Fox** (1–5)	Murry Dickson (4–9)	**Jim Konstanty** (2)	12,525	21–30
52	June 16	Pirates	5–4	**Jim Konstanty** (3–1)	Paul LaPalme (1–1)	None	2,210	22–30
53	June 17 (1)	Cardinals	2–1	**Curt Simmons** (5–2)	Bill Werle (1–2)	None	see 2nd game	23–30
54	June 17 (2)	Cardinals	0–4	Al Brazle (4–1)	**Robin Roberts** (7–5)	Eddie Yuhas (2)	22,854	23–31
55	June 18	Cardinals	1–7	Joe Presko (4–3)	**Russ Meyer** (3–8)	None	9,973	23–32
56	June 19	Cardinals	4–6	Cloyd Boyer (3–3)	**Howie Fox** (1–6)	Al Brazle (10)	7,751	23–33
57	June 20	Reds	3–1	**Robin Roberts** (8–5)	Ewell Blackwell (2–8)	None	6,367	24–33
–	June 21	Reds	Postponed (rain); Makeup: July 29 as a traditional double-header					
58	June 22 (1)	Reds	3–5	Frank Smith (6–3)	**Andy Hansen** (1–2)	None	see 2nd game	24–34
59	June 22 (2)	Reds	3–0 (7)^{^{[a]}}	**Karl Drews** (3–7)	Herm Wehmeier (4–4)	None	6,891	25–34
–	June 23	Cubs	Postponed (rain); Makeup: June 24 as a traditional double-header					
60	June 24 (1)	Cubs	6–0	**Robin Roberts** (9–5)	Bob Rush (9–4)	None	see 2nd game	26–34
61	June 24 (2)	Cubs	2–1	**Russ Meyer** (4–8)	Johnny Klippstein (4–5)	**Jim Konstanty** (3)	13,102	27–34
62	June 25	Cubs	1–4	Bob Kelly (2–4)	**Karl Drews** (3–8)	Dutch Leonard (4)	5,128	27–35
63	June 27	Giants	6–0	**Curt Simmons** (6–2)	Larry Jansen (6–4)	None	13,569	28–35
64	June 28	Giants	7–2	**Robin Roberts** (10–5)	Jim Hearn (8–2)	None	17,182	29–35
65	June 29	Giants	3–12	Hoyt Wilhelm (6–2)	**Russ Meyer** (4–9)	Max Lanier (4)	12,034	29–36
66	June 30	@ Dodgers	4–0	**Karl Drews** (4–8)	Carl Erskine (7–2)	None	21,377	30–36

July (22–10)

#	Date	Opponent	Score	Win	Loss	Save	Attendance	Record
67	July 1	@ Dodgers	3–4	Clem Labine (5–2)	**Jim Konstanty** (3–2)	None	7,184	30–37
68	July 2 (1)	@ Dodgers	4–3	**Robin Roberts** (11–5)	Chris Van Cuyk (5–5)	None	see 2nd game	31–37
69	July 2 (2)	@ Dodgers	2–1	**Russ Meyer** (5–9)	Ben Wade (6–5)	**Andy Hansen** (1)	17,216	32–37
70	July 3	@ Braves	2–0	**Curt Simmons** (7–2)	Jim Wilson (7–6)	None	1,232	33–37
71	July 4 (1)	@ Braves	1–2 (11)	Lew Burdette (4–3)	**Karl Drews** (4–9)	None	see 2nd game	33–38
72	July 4 (2)	@ Braves	2–3	Vern Bickford (3–9)	**Ken Heintzelman** (1–3)	None	7,610	33–39
73	July 5	@ Giants	3–2	**Howie Fox** (2–6)	Larry Jansen (7–5)	None	12,691	34–39
74	July 6 (1)	@ Giants	0–2	Max Lanier (3–4)	**Robin Roberts** (11–6)	None	see 2nd game	34–40
75	July 6 (2)	@ Giants	4–1	**Russ Meyer** (6–9)	Sal Maglie (11–4)	None	24,238	35–40
–	July 8	**1952 Major League Baseball All-Star Game at Shibe Park in Philadelphia**						
76	July 10	@ Cardinals	3–10	Gerry Staley (12–6)	**Curt Simmons** (7–3)	None	13,416	35–41
77	July 11	@ Cardinals	4–3 (10)	**Robin Roberts** (12–6)	Al Brazle (6–2)	None	13,020	36–41
78	July 12	@ Cardinals	2–3	Harry Brecheen (4–3)	**Russ Meyer** (6–10)	Eddie Yuhas (4)	10,355	36–42
79	July 13 (1)	@ Cubs	7–3	**Karl Drews** (5–9)	Warren Hacker (6–3)	**Andy Hansen** (2)	see 2nd game	37–42
80	July 13 (2)	@ Cubs	9–2	**Steve Ridzik** (1–0)	Bob Rush (9–7)	**Jim Konstanty** (4)	29,065	38–42
–	July 14	@ Cubs	Postponed (rain); Makeup: August 24 as a traditional double-header					
81	July 15	@ Pirates	10–3	**Curt Simmons** (8–3)	Howie Pollet (3–10)	None	10,244	39–42
82	July 16	@ Pirates	8–7	**Robin Roberts** (13–6)	Murry Dickson (6–14)	**Andy Hansen** (3)	2,569	40–42
83	July 17 (1)	@ Pirates	1–2	Cal Hogue (1–0)	**Russ Meyer** (6–11)	None	see 2nd game	40–43
84	July 17 (2)	@ Pirates	2–4	Ted Wilks (5–4)	**Karl Drews** (5–10)	None	5,304	40–44
85	July 18	@ Reds	7–5	**Jim Konstanty** (4–2)	Frank Hiller (4–6)	**Russ Meyer** (1)	6,424	41–44
86	July 19	@ Reds	7–5	**Karl Drews** (6–10)	Bud Podbielan (0–1)	None	2,215	42–44
87	July 20 (1)	@ Reds	5–6 (10)	Frank Smith (8–7)	**Russ Meyer** (6–12)	None	see 2nd game	42–45
88	July 20 (2)	@ Reds	4–3	**Robin Roberts** (14–6)	Bubba Church (1–6)	None	9,170	43–45
89	July 22 (1)^{^{[b]}}	Pirates	14–4	**Russ Meyer** (7–12)	Cal Hogue (1–1)	None	see 2nd game	44–45
90	July 22 (2)^{^{[b]}}	Pirates	8–1	**Karl Drews** (7–10)	Woody Main (2–8)	**Andy Hansen** (4)	11,213	45–45
91	July 23	Pirates	4–1	**Steve Ridzik** (2–0)	Bob Friend (4–15)	**Robin Roberts** (1)	4,611	46–45
92	July 25	Cubs	3–8	Warren Hacker (8–3)	**Curt Simmons** (8–4)	None	10,802	46–46
93	July 26	Cubs	7–2	**Robin Roberts** (15–6)	Johnny Klippstein (6–8)	None	4,312	47–46
94	July 27 (1)	Cubs	12–8	**Andy Hansen** (2–2)	Paul Minner (9–7)	**Jim Konstanty** (5)	see 2nd game	48–46
95	July 27 (2)	Cubs	3–0	**Karl Drews** (8–10)	Bob Rush (10–8)	None	11,134	49–46
96	July 29 (1)	Reds	6–1	**Curt Simmons** (9–4)	Ewell Blackwell (2–11)	None	see 2nd game	50–46
97	July 29 (2)	Reds	4–3	**Andy Hansen** (3–2)	Ken Raffensberger (10–9)	None	19,055	51–46
98	July 30	Reds	7–3	**Robin Roberts** (16–6)	Frank Smith (8–9)	None	7,505	52–46

August (18–12)

#	Date	Opponent	Score	Win	Loss	Save	Attendance	Record
99	August 1	Cardinals	5–10	Eddie Yuhas (8–2)	**Andy Hansen** (3–3)	None	18,778	52–47
100	August 2	Cardinals	6–2	**Karl Drews** (9–10)	Gerry Staley (13–10)	**Robin Roberts** (2)	12,889	53–47
101	August 3	Cardinals	6–0	**Curt Simmons** (10–4)	Joe Presko (6–6)	None	13,715	54–47
–	August 5 (1)	@ Braves	Postponed (rain); Makeup: August 7 as a traditional double-header					
–	August 5 (2)	@ Braves	Postponed (rain); Makeup: August 31 as a traditional double-header					
–	August 6 (1)	@ Braves	Postponed (rain); Makeup: August 30 as a traditional double-header					
–	August 6 (2)	@ Braves	Postponed (rain); Makeup: September 6 in Philadelphia as a traditional double-header					
102	August 7 (1)	@ Braves	2–1	**Robin Roberts** (17–6)	Vern Bickford (7–11)	None	see 2nd game	55–47
103	August 7 (2)	@ Braves	10–2	**Russ Meyer** (8–12)	Jim Wilson (10–9)	None	4,829	56–47
104	August 8	Dodgers	3–6 (10)	Preacher Roe (8–1)	**Curt Simmons** (10–5)	None	16,163	56–48
105	August 9 (1)	Dodgers	0–6	Billy Loes (10–5)	**Karl Drews** (9–11)	None	see 2nd game	56–49
106	August 9 (2)	Dodgers	2–4	Johnny Rutherford (4–2)	**Steve Ridzik** (2–1)	None	34,606	56–50
–	August 10	Dodgers	Postponed (rain); Makeup: September 2 as a traditional double-header					
107	August 11 (1)	Dodgers	7–2	**Robin Roberts** (18–6)	Ben Wade (11–7)	None	see 2nd game	57–50
108	August 11 (2)	Dodgers	5–9	Joe Black (8–2)	**Howie Fox** (2–7)	None	39,705	57–51
–	August 12	Braves	Postponed (rain); Makeup: August 13 as a traditional double-header					
109	August 13 (1)	Braves	3–0	**Karl Drews** (10–11)	Vern Bickford (7–12)	None	see 2nd game	58–51
110	August 13 (2)	Braves	3–9	Max Surkont (8–10)	**Curt Simmons** (10–6)	None	11,280	58–52
111	August 14	Braves	5–3	**Russ Meyer** (9–12)	Warren Spahn (11–12)	None	3,391	59–52
112	August 15	@ Dodgers	8–3	**Robin Roberts** (19–6)	Joe Landrum (1–1)	None	18,182	60–52
113	August 16	@ Dodgers	0–15 (7)	Billy Loes (11–6)	**Curt Simmons** (10–7)	None	7,219	60–53
114	August 17	@ Dodgers	2–1	**Karl Drews** (11–11)	Carl Erskine (11–5)	None	18,863	61–53
115	August 19	@ Pirates	10–5	**Robin Roberts** (20–6)	Ron Necciai (0–2)	None	11,207	62–53
116	August 20	@ Pirates	3–1	**Russ Meyer** (10–12)	Cal Hogue (1–5)	None	2,755	63–53
117	August 22	@ Reds	2–3	Bud Podbielan (1–2)	**Andy Hansen** (3–4)	None	9,915	63–54
118	August 23	@ Reds	2–3	Frank Smith (9–9)	**Karl Drews** (11–12)	None	3,617	63–55
119	August 24 (1)	@ Cubs	0–3	Warren Hacker (11–6)	**Robin Roberts** (20–7)	None	see 2nd game	63–56
120	August 24 (2)	@ Cubs	14–4	**Russ Meyer** (11–12)	Paul Minner (11–9)	None	33,820	64–56
121	August 25	@ Cubs	6–3 (10)	**Andy Hansen** (4–4)	Turk Lown (4–9)	None	6,505	65–56
122	August 26	@ Cubs	2–3 (13)	Bob Schultz (4–2)	**Andy Hansen** (4–5)	None	7,019	65–57
123	August 27	@ Cardinals	7–2	**Curt Simmons** (11–7)	Vinegar Bend Mizell (8–6)	None	9,129	66–57
124	August 28	@ Cardinals	10–6	**Robin Roberts** (21–7)	Harry Brecheen (6–5)	None	7,632	67–57
125	August 30 (1)	@ Braves	4–2	**Karl Drews** (12–12)	Lew Burdette (6–8)	None	see 2nd game	68–57
126	August 30 (2)	@ Braves	8–6	**Andy Hansen** (5–5)	Warren Spahn (12–15)	None	5,277	69–57
127	August 31 (1)	@ Braves	0–1	Virgil Jester (2–4)	**Steve Ridzik** (2–2)	None	see 2nd game	69–58
128	August 31 (2)	@ Braves	4–0	**Jim Konstanty** (5–2)	Max Surkont (10–11)	None	6,920	70–58

September (17–9)

#	Date	Opponent	Score	Win	Loss	Save	Attendance	Record
–	September 1 (1)	Dodgers	Postponed (rain); Makeup: September 23 in Brooklyn as a traditional double-header					
–	September 1 (2)	Dodgers	Postponed (rain); Makeup: September 24 in Brooklyn					
129	September 2 (1)	Dodgers	8–2	**Robin Roberts** (22–7)	Ben Wade (11–8)	None	see 2nd game	71–58
130	September 2 (2)	Dodgers	9–3	**Karl Drews** (13–12)	Ray Moore (1–1)	None	28,582	72–58
131	September 3	@ Giants	3–4 (10)	Bill Connelly (3–0)	**Andy Hansen** (5–6)	None	15,984	72–59
132	September 4	@ Giants	3–4 (11)	Al Corwin (4–0)	**Russ Meyer** (11–13)	None	5,219	72–60
133	September 5	@ Giants	4–5	Al Corwin (5–0)	**Jim Konstanty** (5–3)	Sal Maglie (1)	5,391	72–61
134	September 6 (1)	Braves	7–6 (17)	**Robin Roberts** (23–7)	Bob Chipman (1–1)	None	see 2nd game	73–61
135	September 6 (2)	Braves	1–3^{^{[c]}}	Ernie Johnson (5–1)	**Karl Drews** (13–13)	Lew Burdette (7)	12,474	73–62
136	September 7	Braves	2–1	**Steve Ridzik** (3–2)	Lew Burdette (6–9)	None	6,011	74–62
137	September 9	Cardinals	4–7	Eddie Yuhas (9–2)	**Curt Simmons** (11–8)	Harry Brecheen (2)	9,254	74–63
138	September 10	Cardinals	6–3	**Steve Ridzik** (4–2)	Vinegar Bend Mizell (10–7)	**Jim Konstanty** (6)	7,157	75–63
139	September 11	Cardinals	3–2	**Robin Roberts** (24–7)	Cliff Chambers (4–4)	None	9,177	76–63
140	September 12 (1)^{^{[d]}}	Cubs	1–5	Paul Minner (13–9)	**Karl Drews** (13–14)	None	see 2nd game	76–64
141	September 12 (2)^{^{[d]}}	Cubs	0–7	Bob Kelly (4–9)	**Bob Miller** (0–1)	None	8,571	76–65
142	September 14 (1)	Pirates	5–2	**Curt Simmons** (12–8)	Cal Hogue (1–7)	None	see 2nd game	77–65
143	September 14 (2)	Pirates	2–1	**Russ Meyer** (12–13)	Jim Waugh (1–6)	None	7,238	78–65
144	September 16	Reds	4–2	**Robin Roberts** (25–7)	Niles Jordan (0–1)	None	8,690	79–65
145	September 17	Reds	7–4	**Karl Drews** (14–14)	Frank Hiller (5–8)	None	3,089	80–65
146	September 19	Giants	1–0	**Curt Simmons** (13–8)	Sal Maglie (17–8)	None	10,882	81–65
147	September 20	Giants	3–2	**Robin Roberts** (26–7)	Al Corwin (6–1)	None	21,712	82–65
148	September 21	Giants	6–2	**Russ Meyer** (13–13)	Jim Hearn (14–7)	None	12,891	83–65
149	September 23 (1)	@ Dodgers	4–5	Johnny Rutherford (7–7)	**Karl Drews** (14–15)	None	see 2nd game	83–66
150	September 23 (2)	@ Dodgers	1–0(12)	**Curt Simmons** (14–8)	Jim Hughes (2–1)	**Kent Peterson** (1)	24,408	84–66
151	September 24	@ Dodgers	9–7	**Robin Roberts** (27–7)	Clem Labine (8–4)	None	2,136	85–66
152	September 26	@ Giants	0–8	Sal Maglie (18–8)	**Russ Meyer** (13–14)	Hoyt Wilhelm (11)	1,684	85–67
153	September 27	@ Giants	7–3	**Paul Stuffel** (1–0)	Mario Picone (0–1)	**Kent Peterson** (2)	3,535	86–67
154	September 28	@ Giants	7–4	**Robin Roberts** (28–7)	Jack Harshman (0–2)	None	5,933	87–67

^{^[a]}The second game on June 22, 1952, was called after 7 innings due to darkness. Contemporary newspaper accounts, as well as Retrosheet, indicate that the Cincinnati Reds protested the game, but Baseball-Reference.com does not indicate that an official protest had occurred.
^{^[b]}The original game schedule indicated Pittsburgh at Philadelphia for single games on July 22, 23, and 24.
^{^[c]}The second game on September 6 was suspended (Pennsylvania curfew) in the bottom of the eighth inning with the score 1–3 and was completed September 7, 1952.
^{^[d]}The original game schedule indicated Chicago at Philadelphia for single games on September 12 and 13.

=== Roster ===
1952 Philadelphia Phillies
**Roster**
**Pitchers**: 23 Bubba Church; 22 Karl Drews; 18 Howie Fox; 20 Andy Hansen; 27 Ken Heintzelman; 35 Jim Konstanty; 34 Russ Meyer; 19 Bob Miller; 33 Kent Peterson; 41 Lou Possehl; 37 Steve Ridzik; 36 Robin Roberts; 28 Curt Simmons; 41 Paul Stuffel	**Catchers**: 21 Smoky Burgess; 29 Stan Lopata; **Infielders**: 5 Tommy Brown; 3 Putsy Caballero; 2 Granny Hamner; 9 Nippy Jones; 6 Willie Jones; 7 Jack Lohrke; 8 Connie Ryan; 4 Eddie Waitkus; 5 Dick Young	**Outfielders**: 1 Richie Ashburn; 16 Mel Clark; 14 Del Ennis; 15 Jackie Mayo; 12 Bill Nicholson; 17 Johnny Wyrostek; **Other batters**: 10 Del Wilber	**Manager**: 24 Steve O'Neill; 24 Eddie Sawyer; **Coaches**: 11 Benny Bengough; 32 Dusty Cooke; 32 Eddie Mayo; 40 Maje McDonnell; 31 Cy Perkins; 25 Ken Silvestri

== Player stats ==
= Indicates team leader

=== Batting ===
==== Starters by position ====
Note: Pos = Position; G = Games played; AB = At bats; H = Hits; Avg. = Batting average; HR = Home runs; RBI = Runs batted in

Pos	Player	G	AB	H	Avg.	HR	RBI
C	Smoky Burgess	110	371	110	.296	6	56
1B	Eddie Waitkus	146	499	144	.289	2	49
2B	Connie Ryan	154	577	139	.241	12	49
SS	Granny Hamner	151	596	164	.275	17	87
3B	Willie Jones	147	541	135	.250	18	72
OF	Del Ennis	151	592	171	.289	20	107
OF	Johnny Wyrostek	98	321	88	.274	1	37
OF	Richie Ashburn	154	613	173	.282	1	42

==== Other batters ====
Note: G = Games played; AB = At bats; H = Hits; Avg. = Batting average; HR = Home runs; RBI = Runs batted in

Player	G	AB	H	Avg.	HR	RBI
Stan Lopata	57	179	49	.274	4	27
Mel Clark	47	155	52	.335	1	15
Jackie Mayo	50	119	29	.244	1	4
Bill Nicholson	55	88	24	.273	6	19
Putsy Caballero	35	42	10	.238	0	6
Nippy Jones	8	30	5	.167	1	5
Jack Lohrke	25	29	6	.207	0	1
Tommy Brown	18	25	4	.160	1	2
Dick Young	5	9	2	.222	0	0
Del Wilber	2	2	0	.000	0	0

=== Pitching ===
= Indicates league leader

==== Starting pitchers ====
Note: G = Games pitched; IP = Innings pitched; W = Wins; L = Losses; ERA = Earned run average; SO = Strikeouts

Player	G	IP	W	L	ERA	SO
Robin Roberts	39	330.0	28	7	2.59	148
Russ Meyer	37	232.1	13	14	3.14	92
Karl Drews	33	228.2	14	15	2.72	96
Curt Simmons	28	201.1	14	8	2.82	141
Howie Fox	13	62.0	2	7	5.08	16

==== Other pitchers ====
Note: G = Games pitched; IP = Innings pitched; W = Wins; L = Losses; ERA = Earned run average; SO = Strikeouts

Player	G	IP	W	L	ERA	SO
Steve Ridzik	24	92.2	4	2	3.01	43
Lou Possehl	4	12.2	0	1	4.97	4
Bob Miller	3	9.0	0	1	6.00	2
Paul Stuffel	2	6.0	1	0	3.00	3
Bubba Church	2	5.0	0	0	10.80	3

==== Relief pitchers ====
Note: G = Games pitched; W = Wins; L = Losses; SV = Saves; ERA = Earned run average; SO = Strikeouts

Player	G	W	L	SV	ERA	SO
Jim Konstanty	42	5	3	6	3.94	16
Andy Hansen	43	5	6	4	3.26	18
Ken Heintzelman	23	1	3	1	3.16	20
Kent Peterson	3	0	0	0	0.00	7

== Awards and honors ==
- Robin Roberts, Sporting News Player of the Year Award
- Robin Roberts, Sporting News Pitcher of the Year Award

All-Star Game

- Curt Simmons, Pitcher, Starter
- Granny Hamner, Shortstop, Starter
- Robin Roberts, Pitcher, Reserve

=== League leaders ===
- Robin Roberts, National League Leader, Wins (28)

== Farm system ==
Level	Team	League	Manager
AAA	Baltimore Orioles	International League	Don Heffner
A	Schenectady Blue Jays	Eastern League	Dan Carnevale
A	Tri-City Braves	Western International League	Charlie Gassaway
B	Terre Haute Phillies	Illinois–Indiana–Iowa League	Skeeter Newsome
B	Wilmington Blue Rocks	Interstate League	Leon Riley
C	Grand Forks Chiefs	Northern League	Eddie Murphy
C	Salt Lake City Bees	Pioneer League	Hub Kittle
C	Granby Phillies	Provincial League	Al Barillari
C	Salina Blue Jays	Western Association	Floyd "Pat" Patterson
D	Pulaski Phillies	Appalachian League	Al Gardella
D	Miami Eagles	Kansas–Oklahoma–Missouri League	John Davenport
D	Bradford Phillies	PONY League	Dick Carter

LEAGUE CHAMPIONS: Terre Haute, Miami
