= 1952 Brooklyn Dodgers season =

1952 Brooklyn Dodgers
- National League champions
- League: National League
- Ballpark: Ebbets Field
- City: Brooklyn, New York
- Record: 96–57 (.627)
- League place: 1st
- Owners: Walter O'Malley, James & Dearie Mulvey, Mary Louise Smith
- President: Walter O'Malley
- General managers: Buzzie Bavasi
- Managers: Chuck Dressen
- Television: WOR-TV
- Radio: WMGM; Red Barber, Connie Desmond, Vin Scully

The 1952 Brooklyn Dodgers season was the 63rd season for the Brooklyn Dodgers franchise in the MLB. The team rebounded from the heartbreaking ending of 1951 to win the National League pennant by four games over the New York Giants. However, they dropped the World Series in seven games to the New York Yankees. Led by Gil Hodges, Jackie Robinson, and Duke Snider, the high-powered Brooklyn offense scored the most runs in the majors. This was the first year that the ballclub had red uniform numbers on the lower left front of their white home jerseys which was originally planned for the previous year's Fall Classic for which they failed to qualify.

== Offseason ==
- October 16, 1951: Don Nicholas was purchased from the Dodgers by the Chicago White Sox.
- December 3, 1951: Toby Atwell was traded by the Dodgers to the Chicago Cubs for Carmen Mauro.
- December 6, 1951: Héctor Rodríguez was traded by the Dodgers to the Chicago White Sox for Rocky Nelson.

== Regular season ==
- July 24, 1952: Duke Snider hit the 100th home run of his career. It was a walk-off version in the 11th inning off Frank Smith of the Cincinnati Reds.

=== Season standings ===
National League
Team	W	L	Pct.	GB	Home	Road
Brooklyn Dodgers	96	57	.627	—	45‍–‍33	51‍–‍24
New York Giants	92	62	.597	4½	50‍–‍27	42‍–‍35
St. Louis Cardinals	88	66	.571	8½	48‍–‍29	40‍–‍37
Philadelphia Phillies	87	67	.565	9½	47‍–‍29	40‍–‍38
Chicago Cubs	77	77	.500	19½	42‍–‍35	35‍–‍42
Cincinnati Reds	69	85	.448	27½	38‍–‍39	31‍–‍46
Boston Braves	64	89	.418	32	31‍–‍45	33‍–‍44
Pittsburgh Pirates	42	112	.273	54½	23‍–‍54	19‍–‍58

=== Record vs. opponents ===
1952 National League record Sources:
Team	BSN	BRO	CHC	CIN	NYG	PHI	PIT	STL
Boston	—	3–18–1	12–10	9–13	9–13	9–13	15–7–1	7–15
Brooklyn	18–3–1	—	13–9–1	17–5	8–14	10–12	19–3	11–11
Chicago	10–12	9–13–1	—	13–9	10–12	10–12	14–8	11–11
Cincinnati	13–9	5–17	9–13	—	6–16	10–12	16–6	10–12
New York	13–9	14–8	12–10	16–6	—	10–12	15–7	12–10
Philadelphia	13–9	12–10	12–10	12–10	12–10	—	16–6	10–12
Pittsburgh	7–15–1	3–19	8–14	6–16	7–15	6–16	—	5–17
St. Louis	15–7	11–11	11–11	12–10	10–12	12–10	17–5	—

=== Opening Day lineup ===
Opening Day Lineup
#	Name	Position
1	Pee Wee Reese	SS
3	Billy Cox	3B
42	Jackie Robinson	2B
39	Roy Campanella	C
48	Andy Pafko	LF
4	Duke Snider	CF
14	Gil Hodges	1B
6	Carl Furillo	RF
28	Preacher Roe	P

=== Notable transactions ===
- May 10, 1952: Marion Fricano was purchased from the Dodgers by the Philadelphia Athletics.
- June 9, 1952: Cal Abrams was traded by the Dodgers to the Cincinnati Reds for Rudy Rufer and cash.
- June 15, 1952: Bud Podbielan was traded by the Dodgers to the Cincinnati Reds for Bud Byerly and cash.

=== Roster ===
1952 Brooklyn Dodgers
Roster
Pitchers: 49 Joe Black; 12 Ralph Branca; 17 Carl Erskine; 18 Jim Hughes; 23 Clyde King; 41 Clem Labine; 19 Joe Landrum; 16 Ken Lehman; 30 Billy Loes; 45 Ray Moore; 34 Ron Negray; 40 Bud Podbielan; 28 Preacher Roe; 15 Johnny Rutherford; 19 Johnny Schmitz; 25 Chris Van Cuyk; 46 Ben Wade	Catchers: 39 Roy Campanella; 44 Steve Lembo; 10 Rube Walker; Infielders: 9 Rocky Bridges; 3 Billy Cox; 14 Gil Hodges; 2 Bobby Morgan; 32 Rocky Nelson; 1 Pee Wee Reese; 42 Jackie Robinson	Outfielders: 32 Cal Abrams; 5 Sandy Amorós; 6 Carl Furillo; 29 Tommy Holmes; 48 Andy Pafko; 8 George Shuba; 4 Duke Snider; 38 Dick Williams	Manager: 7 Charlie Dressen; Coaches: 22 Billy Herman; 27 Cookie Lavagetto; 47 George Pfister; 31 Jake Pitler

== Player stats ==
=== Batting ===
==== Starters by position ====
Note: Pos = Position; G = Games played; AB = At bats; H = Hits; Avg. = Batting average; HR = Home runs; RBI = Runs batted in

Pos	Player	G	AB	H	Avg.	HR	RBI
C	Roy Campanella	128	468	126	.269	22	97
1B	Gil Hodges	153	508	129	.254	32	102
2B	Jackie Robinson	149	510	157	.308	19	75
3B	Billy Cox	116	455	118	.259	6	34
SS	Pee Wee Reese	149	559	152	.272	6	58
LF	Andy Pafko	150	551	158	.287	19	85
CF	Duke Snider	144	534	162	.303	21	92
RF	Carl Furillo	134	425	105	.247	8	59

==== Other batters ====
Note: G = Games played; AB = At bats; H = Hits; Avg. = Batting average; HR = Home runs; RBI = Runs batted in

Player	G	AB	H	Avg.	HR	RBI
George Shuba	94	256	78	.305	9	40
Bobby Morgan	67	191	45	.236	7	16
Rube Walker	46	139	36	.259	1	19
Dick Williams	36	68	21	.309	0	11
Rocky Bridges	51	56	11	.196	0	2
Sandy Amorós	20	44	11	.250	0	3
Rocky Nelson	37	39	10	.256	0	3
Tommy Holmes	31	36	4	.111	0	1
Cal Abrams	10	10	2	.200	0	0
Steve Lembo	2	5	1	.200	0	1

=== Pitching ===
==== Starting pitchers ====
Note: G = Games pitched; IP = Innings pitched; W = Wins; L = Losses; ERA = Earned run average; SO = Strikeouts

Player	G	IP	W	L	ERA	SO
Carl Erskine	33	206.2	14	6	2.70	131
Billy Loes	39	187.1	13	8	2.69	115
Ben Wade	37	180.0	11	9	3.60	118
Preacher Roe	27	158.2	11	2	3.12	83

==== Other pitchers ====
Note: G = Games pitched; IP = Innings pitched; W = Wins; L = Losses; ERA = Earned run average; SO = Strikeouts

Player	G	IP	W	L	ERA	SO
Chris Van Cuyk	23	97.2	5	6	5.16	66
Johnny Rutherford	22	97.1	7	7	4.25	29
Clem Labine	25	77.0	8	4	5.14	43
Ralph Branca	16	61.0	4	2	3.84	26
Joe Landrum	9	38.0	1	3	5.21	17
Johnny Schmitz	10	33.1	1	1	4.32	11
Ray Moore	14	28.1	1	2	4.76	11
Ken Lehman	4	15.1	1	2	5.28	7
Ron Negray	4	13.0	0	0	3.46	5

==== Relief pitchers ====
Note: G = Games pitched; W = Wins; L = Losses; SV = Saves; ERA = Earned run average; SO = Strikeouts

Player	G	W	L	SV	ERA	SO
Joe Black	56	15	4	15	2.15	85
Clyde King	23	2	0	0	5.06	17
Jim Hughes	6	2	1	0	1.45	8
Bud Podbielan	3	0	0	0	18.00	1

== 1952 World Series ==
=== Game 1 ===
October 1, 1952, at Ebbets Field in Brooklyn, New York

Team	1	2	3	4	5	6	7	8	9	R	H	E
New York (A)	0	0	1	0	0	0	0	1	0	2	6	2
Brooklyn (N)	0	1	0	0	0	2	0	1	x	4	6	0
W: Joe Black (1–0) L: Allie Reynolds (0–1)
HR: NYY – Gil McDougald (1) BRO – Jackie Robinson (1), Duke Snider (1), Pee Wee Reese (1)

=== Game 2 ===
October 2, 1952, at Ebbets Field in Brooklyn, New York

Team	1	2	3	4	5	6	7	8	9	R	H	E
New York (A)	0	0	0	1	1	5	0	0	0	7	10	0
Brooklyn (N)	0	0	1	0	0	0	0	0	0	1	3	1
W: Vic Raschi (1–0) L: Carl Erskine (0–1)
HR: NYY – Billy Martin (1)

=== Game 3 ===
October 3, 1952, at Yankee Stadium in New York City

Team	1	2	3	4	5	6	7	8	9	R	H	E
Brooklyn (N)	0	0	1	0	1	0	0	1	2	5	11	0
New York (A)	0	1	0	0	0	0	0	1	1	3	6	2
W: Preacher Roe (1–0) L: Ed Lopat (0–1)
HR: NYY – Yogi Berra (1), Johnny Mize (1)

=== Game 4 ===
October 4, 1952, at Yankee Stadium in New York City

Team	1	2	3	4	5	6	7	8	9	R	H	E
Brooklyn (N)	0	0	0	0	0	0	0	0	0	0	4	1
New York (A)	0	0	0	1	0	0	0	1	x	2	4	1
W: Allie Reynolds (1–1) L: Joe Black (1–1)
HR: NYY – Johnny Mize (2)

=== Game 5 ===
October 5, 1952, at Yankee Stadium in New York City

Team	1	2	3	4	5	6	7	8	9	10	11	R	H	E
Brooklyn (N)	0	1	0	0	3	0	1	0	0	0	1	6	10	0
New York (A)	0	0	0	0	5	0	0	0	0	0	0	5	5	1
W: Carl Erskine (1–1) L: Johnny Sain (0–1)
HR: BRO – Duke Snider (2) NYY – Johnny Mize (3)

=== Game 6 ===
October 6, 1952, at Ebbets Field in Brooklyn, New York

Team	1	2	3	4	5	6	7	8	9	R	H	E
New York (A)	0	0	0	0	0	0	2	1	0	3	9	0
Brooklyn (N)	0	0	0	0	0	1	0	1	0	2	8	1
W: Vic Raschi (2–0) L: Billy Loes (0–1) S: Allie Reynolds (1)
HR: NYY – Yogi Berra (2), Mickey Mantle (1) BRO – Duke Snider (3, 4)

=== Game 7 ===
October 7, 1952, at Ebbets Field in Brooklyn, New York

Team	1	2	3	4	5	6	7	8	9	R	H	E
New York (A)	0	0	0	1	1	1	1	0	0	4	10	4
Brooklyn (N)	0	0	0	1	1	0	0	0	0	2	8	1
W: Allie Reynolds (2–1) L: Joe Black (1–2) S: Bob Kuzava (1)
HR: NYY – Gene Woodling (1), Mickey Mantle (2)

== Awards and honors ==
- National League Rookie of the Year
  - Joe Black
- TSN Rookie of the Year Award
  - Joe Black

=== All-Stars ===
- 1952 Major League Baseball All-Star Game
  - Roy Campanella starter
  - Jackie Robinson starter
  - Carl Furillo reserve
  - Gil Hodges reserve
  - Pee Wee Reese reserve
  - Preacher Roe reserve
  - Duke Snider reserve
- TSN Major League All-Star Team
  - Jackie Robinson

=== League top five finishers ===
Gil Hodges

- #2 in NL in walks (107)
- #3 in NL in home runs (32)
- #4 in NL in RBI (102)

Billy Loes

- #4 in NL in ERA (2.69)

Pee Wee Reese

- MLB leader in stolen bases (30)

Jackie Robinson

- MLB leader in on-base percentage (.440)
- #3 in NL in runs scored (104)
- #3 in NL in stolen bases (24)
- #3 in NL in walks (106)
- #4 in NL in batting average (.308)

== Farm system ==
Level	Team	League	Manager
AAA	Montreal Royals	International League	Walter Alston
AAA	St. Paul Saints	American Association	Clay Bryant
AA	Ft. Worth Cats	Texas League	Bobby Bragan
AA	Mobile Bears	Southern Association	Ed Head
A	Elmira Pioneers	Eastern League	George Fallon
A	Pueblo Dodgers	Western League	Bill McCahan
B	Lancaster Red Roses	Interstate League	James Bivin
B	Miami Sun Sox	Florida International League	Max Macon
B	Newport News Dodgers	Piedmont League	Ray Hathaway
C	Great Falls Electrics	Pioneer League	Lou Rochelli
C	Greenwood Dodgers	Cotton States League	Stan Wasiak
C	Santa Barbara Dodgers	California League	George Scherger
D	Hazard Bombers	Mountain States League	Mervin Dornburg
D	Hornell Dodgers	Pennsylvania–Ontario–New York League	Doc Alexson
D	Ponca City Dodgers	Kansas–Oklahoma–Missouri League	Boyd Bartley
D	Sheboygan Indians	Wisconsin State League	Joe Hauser
D	Valdosta Dodgers	Georgia–Florida League	John Angelone
