= 1952 Cincinnati Reds season =

1952 Cincinnati Reds
- League: National League
- Ballpark: Crosley Field
- City: Cincinnati
- Owners: Powel Crosley Jr.
- General managers: Gabe Paul
- Managers: Luke Sewell, Rogers Hornsby
- Television: WCPO-TV (Waite Hoyt, Bob Gilmore)
- Radio: WCPO (Waite Hoyt, Bob Gilmore)

The 1952 Cincinnati Reds season was the franchise's 63rd year as a member of the National League and its 71st consecutive year of operation in Major League Baseball. The Reds won 69 games, lost 85, and finished sixth, drawing 604,197 spectators to Crosley Field, next-to-last in the eight-team league.

== Offseason ==
- October 4, 1951: Johnny Pramesa and Bob Usher were traded by the Reds to the Chicago Cubs for Smoky Burgess and Bob Borkowski.
- October 14, 1951: Jim Bolger was traded by the Reds to the Buffalo Bisons for Tom Acker and Moe Savransky.
- December 10, 1951: Smoky Burgess, Howie Fox and Connie Ryan were traded by the Reds to the Philadelphia Phillies for Andy Seminick, Eddie Pellagrini, Dick Sisler, and Niles Jordan.
- Prior to 1952 season: Charlie Rabe was signed as an amateur free agent by the Reds.

== Regular season ==
- July 29, 1952: Manager Luke Sewell, in his third full year at the helm, is fired with Cincinnati 39–59 (.398) and in seventh place, 26 games out of the league lead. Coach Earle Brucker Sr. takes control as interim manager and the Reds win three of five decisions under him.
- August 5, 1952: Baseball Hall of Fame batsman Rogers Hornsby, 56, is named permanent manager. He leads the Reds to a 27–24 (.529) record for the remainder of the year, enabling them to climb to sixth place.

=== Season standings ===
National League
Team	W	L	Pct.	GB	Home	Road
Brooklyn Dodgers	96	57	.627	—	45‍–‍33	51‍–‍24
New York Giants	92	62	.597	4½	50‍–‍27	42‍–‍35
St. Louis Cardinals	88	66	.571	8½	48‍–‍29	40‍–‍37
Philadelphia Phillies	87	67	.565	9½	47‍–‍29	40‍–‍38
Chicago Cubs	77	77	.500	19½	42‍–‍35	35‍–‍42
Cincinnati Reds	69	85	.448	27½	38‍–‍39	31‍–‍46
Boston Braves	64	89	.418	32	31‍–‍45	33‍–‍44
Pittsburgh Pirates	42	112	.273	54½	23‍–‍54	19‍–‍58

=== Record vs. opponents ===
1952 National League record Sources:
Team	BSN	BRO	CHC	CIN	NYG	PHI	PIT	STL
Boston	—	3–18–1	12–10	9–13	9–13	9–13	15–7–1	7–15
Brooklyn	18–3–1	—	13–9–1	17–5	8–14	10–12	19–3	11–11
Chicago	10–12	9–13–1	—	13–9	10–12	10–12	14–8	11–11
Cincinnati	13–9	5–17	9–13	—	6–16	10–12	16–6	10–12
New York	13–9	14–8	12–10	16–6	—	10–12	15–7	12–10
Philadelphia	13–9	12–10	12–10	12–10	12–10	—	16–6	10–12
Pittsburgh	7–15–1	3–19	8–14	6–16	7–15	6–16	—	5–17
St. Louis	15–7	11–11	11–11	12–10	10–12	12–10	17–5	—

=== Notable transactions ===
- May 13, 1952: Dick Sisler and Virgil Stallcup were traded by the Reds to the St. Louis Cardinals for Eddie Kazak and Wally Westlake.
- May 23, 1952: Kent Peterson and Johnny Wyrostek were traded by the Reds to the Philadelphia Phillies for Bubba Church.
- August 7, 1952: Wally Westlake was purchased from the Reds by the Cleveland Indians.
- August 28, 1952: Ewell Blackwell was traded by the Reds to the New York Yankees for Jim Greengrass, Bob Marquis, Ernie Nevel, Johnny Schmitz and $35,000.

=== Roster ===
1952 Cincinnati Reds roster
Roster
Pitchers: 47 Ewell Blackwell; 45 Ed Blake; 38 Bud Byerly; 40 Bubba Church; 45 Phil Haugstad; 41 Frank Hiller; 25,40 Niles Jordan; 39 Joe Nuxhall; 35 Harry Perkowski; 38 Bud Podbielan; 36 Ken Raffensberger; 45 Johnny Schmitz; 32 Frank Smith; 31 Herm Wehmeier	Catchers: 6 Dixie Howell; 10 Hobie Landrith; 9 Joe Rossi; 7 Andy Seminick; Infielders: 12 Bobby Adams; 15 Grady Hatton; 10 Eddie Kazak; 18 Ted Kluszewski; 11 Roy McMillan; 13 Eddie Pellagrini; 10 Virgil Stallcup; 16 Johnny Temple	Outfielders: 28 Cal Abrams; 26 Joe Adcock; 24 Bob Borkowski; 25 Hank Edwards; 23 Jim Greengrass; 22 Willard Marshall; 28 Wally Post; 23 Dick Sisler; 23 Wally Westlake; 22 Johnny Wyrostek	Manager: 50 Rogers Hornsby; 50 Luke Sewell; Coaches: 51 Earle Brucker; 52 Ben Chapman; 53 Phil Page

== Player stats ==
=== Batting ===
==== Starters by position ====
Note: Pos = Position; G = Games played; AB = At bats; H = Hits; Avg. = Batting average; HR = Home runs; RBI = Runs batted in

Pos	Player	G	AB	H	Avg.	HR	RBI
C	Andy Seminick	108	336	86	.256	14	50
1B	Ted Kluszewski	135	497	159	.320	16	86
2B	Grady Hatton	128	433	92	.212	9	57
SS	Roy McMillan	154	540	132	.244	7	57
3B	Bobby Adams	154	637	180	.283	6	48
OF	Willard Marshall	107	397	106	.267	8	46
OF	Bob Borkowski	126	377	95	.252	4	24
OF	Joe Adcock	117	378	105	.278	13	52

==== Other batters ====
Note: G = Games played; AB = At bats; H = Hits; Avg. = Batting average; HR = Home runs; RBI = Runs batted in

Player	G	AB	H	Avg.	HR	RBI
Hank Edwards	74	184	52	.283	6	28
Wally Westlake	49	183	37	.202	3	14
Cal Abrams	71	158	44	.278	2	13
Joe Rossi	55	145	32	.221	1	6
Johnny Wyrostek	30	106	25	.236	1	10
Eddie Pellagrini	46	100	17	.170	1	3
Johnny Temple	30	97	19	.196	1	5
Jim Greengrass	18	68	21	.309	5	24
Wally Post	19	58	9	.155	2	7
Hobie Landrith	15	50	13	.260	0	4
Dixie Howell	17	37	7	.189	2	4
Dick Sisler	11	27	5	.185	0	4
Eddie Kazak	13	15	1	.067	0	0
Virgil Stallcup	2	1	0	.000	0	0

=== Pitching ===
==== Starting pitchers ====
Note: G = Games pitched; IP = Innings pitched; W = Wins; L = Losses; ERA = Earned run average; SO = Strikeouts

Player	G	IP	W	L	ERA	SO
Ken Raffensberger	38	247.0	17	13	2.81	93
Harry Perkowski	33	194.0	12	10	3.80	86
Herm Wehmeier	33	190.1	9	11	5.15	83
Bubba Church	29	153.1	5	9	4.34	47
Ewell Blackwell	23	102.0	3	12	5.38	48

==== Other pitchers ====
Note: G = Games pitched; IP = Innings pitched; W = Wins; L = Losses; ERA = Earned run average; SO = Strikeouts

Player	G	IP	W	L	ERA	SO
Frank Hiller	28	124.0	5	8	4.63	50
Bud Podbielan	24	86.2	4	5	2.80	22
Niles Jordan	3	6.1	0	1	9.95	2

==== Relief pitchers ====
Note: G = Games pitched; W = Wins; L = Losses; SV = Saves; ERA = Earned run average; SO = Strikeouts

Player	G	W	L	SV	ERA	SO
Frank Smith	53	12	11	7	3.75	77
Joe Nuxhall	37	1	4	1	3.22	52
Bud Byerly	12	0	1	1	5.11	14
Phil Haugstad	9	0	0	0	6.75	2
Johnny Schmitz	3	1	0	0	0.00	3
Ed Blake	2	0	0	0	0.00	0

== Farm system ==
Level	Team	League	Manager
AA	Tulsa Oilers	Texas League	Joe Schultz
A	Columbia Reds	Sally League	Ernie White
B	Burlington Flints	Illinois–Indiana–Iowa League	Len Schulte
B	Salisbury Reds	Interstate League	Mike Blazo and Dick Porter
C	Ogden Reds	Pioneer League	Dee Moore
D	Dublin Green Sox	Georgia State League	Cyril Pfeifer, George Hearn and Jack Bearden
D	Mattoon Indians	Mississippi–Ohio Valley League	Walt Dunkovich, Charlie Popovich and Bob Carson
D	Lawton Reds	Sooner State League	Tuck McWilliams
