= Milt Stock =

American baseball player (1893–1977)

- Third baseman
- Born: July 11, 1893; Chicago, Illinois, U.S.
- Died: July 16, 1977 (aged 84); Fairhope, Alabama, U.S.
- Batted: Right Threw: Right

MLB debut
- September 29, 1913, for the New York Giants

Last MLB appearance
- April 16, 1926, for the Brooklyn Robins

MLB statistics
- Batting average: .289
- Home runs: 22
- Runs batted in: 696
- Stats at Baseball Reference

Teams
- New York Giants (1913–1914); Philadelphia Phillies (1915–1918); St. Louis Cardinals (1919–1923); Brooklyn Robins (1924–1926)

Milton Joseph Stock (July 11, 1893 – July 16, 1977) was an American third baseman in Major League Baseball from 1913 through 1926. The Chicago native played for the New York Giants, Philadelphia Phillies, Brooklyn Robins and St. Louis Cardinals. Over 14 MLB seasons, he played in 1,628 games and amassed 1,806 hits, with a .289 lifetime batting average and 155 stolen bases. Stock stood 5 feet 8 inches (1.73 m) tall, weighed 154 pounds (70 kg) and threw and batted right-handed.

== Playing career ==
Stock's first full season was in 1914 with the New York Giants. He was traded to the Philadelphia Phillies before the 1915 season and helped them win that year's National League pennant. In the 1915 World Series, Stock went 2-for-17, with the Phillies losing to the Boston Red Sox in five games. It was his only World Series appearance as an active player.

Stock was traded to the Cardinals before the 1919 season. He responded by hitting .307 that year with a career-best .371 on-base percentage, leading the team with 49 walks. In 1920 he led the National League in games played (155) and at bats (639), finishing tied for second in hits (204, a career-best) and sixth in batting average (.319). Stock batted .307 in 1921 with 96 runs scored, leading the league with 36 sacrifice bunts. He batted .305 in 1922 with a career-high 5 home runs and .418 slugging percentage. In 1923, he led the Cardinals with 96 RBIs, the highest total of his career.

Traded to Brooklyn for the 1924 season, Stock had his worst full season for a team that finished the year only 11/2 games out of first place; he batted .242. In 1925, Stock bounced back with a .328 batting average, 98 runs scored and a .776 OPS, all career highs. He tied a career-high with 9 triples and was fifth in the league with 202 hits, though Brooklyn finished 27 games out of first place.

That season, Stock became the first major league player to attain four hits in each of four consecutive games. He performed the feat between June 30 through July 3, 1925, when he had 16 hits in 23 at bats against the Phillies, Boston Braves and Giants and raised his season battling average from .376 to .404. Julio Rodríguez of the Seattle Mariners is the most recent MLB player with four consecutive four-hit games, in 2023.

But 1925 would be Stock's last full big-league season; he was seriously injured in a collision with Lou Gehrig in spring training in 1926, and retired after playing only three early-season games.

== Coaching career ==
Stock remained in the game as a minor league manager and executive. Then, from 1944 through 1952, Stock coached in the National League for the Chicago Cubs (1944–48), Brooklyn Dodgers (1949–50) and Pittsburgh Pirates (1951–52).

His tenure as third-base coach in Brooklyn ended in controversy when Stock was blamed for his decision to send home baserunner Cal Abrams with the potential winning run in the bottom of the ninth inning of the final game of the 1950 National League season. The Dodgers trailed the Phillies by one game in the standings and needed to win the season's last game, against Philadelphia at Ebbets Field on October 1, to force a best-of-three playoff series.

With the score tied at one in the bottom of the ninth, Abrams was on second base with none out when Duke Snider singled sharply to center field. Stock was criticized for not holding Abrams at third base on the hit. Instead, he waved Abrams home, where he was thrown out easily by Phils' centerfielder Richie Ashburn, who was playing shallow to back up second base in the event of a wild throw on a pickoff attempt. Had Abrams (or any Dodger) scored, Brooklyn would have had a "walk-off" victory and forced the playoff. But the Dodgers squandered their scoring opportunity, the game went into extra innings, and Philadelphia won the game and the National League championship (their first since Stock's 1915 team) in the tenth inning on a three-run home run by Dick Sisler.

In the weeks following that season-ending game, Dodger manager Burt Shotton was fired and Stock moved on to the Pirates, where he coached two more seasons before leaving the game.

== Personal life ==
Stock settled in the Mobile, Alabama, area after playing minor league baseball there in 1913; he died in nearby Fairhope on July 16, 1977, at the age of 84.

Stock's daughter Myrtle married Eddie Stanky, the future MLB second baseman and manager and longtime college baseball coach; Stanky played under Stock with the Macon Peaches of the Sally League between 1939 and 1941.

== See also ==
- List of Major League Baseball career stolen bases leaders
- List of St. Louis Cardinals team records
