= Cal Abrams =

American baseball player (1924–1997)

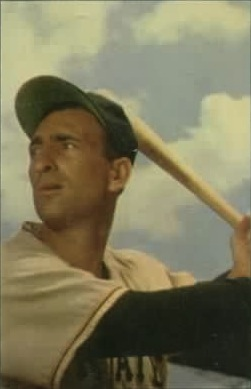
- Abrams in 1953
- Outfielder
- Born: March 2, 1924; Philadelphia, Pennsylvania, U.S.
- Died: February 25, 1997 (aged 72); Fort Lauderdale, Florida, U.S.
- Batted: Left Threw: Left

MLB debut
- April 20, 1949, for the Brooklyn Dodgers

Last MLB appearance
- May 9, 1956, for the Chicago White Sox

MLB statistics
- Batting average: .269
- Home runs: 32
- Runs batted in: 138
- Stats at Baseball Reference

Teams
- Brooklyn Dodgers (1949–1952); Cincinnati Reds (1952); Pittsburgh Pirates (1953–1954); Baltimore Orioles (1954–1955); Chicago White Sox (1956)

Calvin Ross Abrams (March 2, 1924 – February 25, 1997), nicknamed "Abie", was an American professional baseball outfielder. He played in Major League Baseball (MLB) between 1949 and 1956 for the Brooklyn Dodgers, Cincinnati Reds, Pittsburgh Pirates, Baltimore Orioles, and Chicago White Sox.

== Baseball career ==
=== Minor league ===
Abrams was born in Philadelphia, Pennsylvania, and signed by Joe Labate, a scout for the Brooklyn Dodgers, out of James Madison High School in Brooklyn in 1942, and assigned to the Olean Oilers of the Class D Pennsylvania–Ontario–New York League (PONY League). He played in 19 games that season.

In January 1943, he was inducted into the Army. He was assigned to Battery B 500th Anti-Aircraft Artillery, and served in Europe and the Pacific with two battle stars in the Pacific. Abrams was also awarded the Philippine Liberation Medal with one bronze star. He was released from the service in January 1946.

He then played for the Danville Dodgers in the Class B Three-I League for the 1946 season, hitting .331 and leading the league with 13 triples. The next two seasons, Abrams was with the Mobile Bears in the Class AA Southern Association, batting .345 and .337.

=== Major league ===
On April 20, 1949, he made his Major League debut with the Dodgers, and then was sent to the Fort Worth Cats of the AA Texas League for the rest of the season, where he hit .336. He split 1950 between the St. Paul Saints of the AAA American Association, for whom he hit .333 with a league-leading .502 on base percentage, and the Dodgers. A New York Post headline once read: Mantle, Schmantle. We Got Abie.

In 1950, he changed his uniform number to 18, explaining later: "18 means a lot." The number 18 stands for the Hebrew word for life. He wore this number for the majority of his career.

On October 1, 1950, the Dodgers and Philadelphia Phillies were playing a game that would determine which team would win the National League pennant. In the bottom of the 9th inning, with nobody out and the game tied 1–1, Abrams was on second base when Duke Snider hit a single to short center field. He was waved home by third-base coach Milt Stock, and was gunned down at the plate by a perfect throw by Phillies center fielder Richie Ashburn, who had fielded the ball on one bounce. The play resulted in the preservation of the 1–1 tie, and facilitated the Phils' Dick Sisler's 10th-inning pennant-winning home run.

In 1951, his manager Charlie Dressen, who was "capable of cruelty", failed to play him on "Cal Abrams Day." He finished the season with a .419 on-base percentage.

On June 9, 1952, he was traded by the Brooklyn Dodgers to the Cincinnati Reds for Rudy Rufer and cash. On October 14, 1952, he was traded by the Reds with Gail Henley and Joe Rossi to the Pittsburgh Pirates for Gus Bell.

In 1953, he hit 15 home runs, his career high, and had 13 assists and 3 double plays-leading all NL right fielders.

On May 25, 1954, he was traded by the Pittsburgh Pirates to the Baltimore Orioles for Dick Littlefield. In 1954, he was 7th in the AL with a .400 OBP, and 10th in the league with 7 triples. He came in 26th in the AL MVP voting.

In 1955, he had a .413 OBP, was 8th in the league in walks with 89, and was 4th in the league in assists by a center fielder with 6. On October 18, 1955, he was traded by the Baltimore Orioles to the Chicago White Sox for Bobby Adams.

He remained in the Major Leagues into the 1956 season, when he was sent to the Miami Marlins in the AAA International League. The next year Abrams retired from play.

In all of his minor league seasons, his lowest batting average was .331.

He played in 567 major league games with the Dodgers, Reds, Pirates, Orioles, and White Sox.

In eight seasons, Abrams posted a .269 batting average (433-for-1611) with 257 runs, 32 home runs, 138 RBIs, 304 bases on balls, .386 on-base percentage and .392 slugging percentage. Defensively, he recorded a .977 fielding percentage playing at all three outfield positions.

== After baseball ==
In the late 1950s and early 1960s, Abrams owned The Blossom Lounge in Garden City South, New York, near Adelphi College, later University. In the 1960s Abrams was also associated with Camp Iroquois in Peterborough, New Hampshire which was owned by Leo and Rose Trigoboff. Following the devastating ninth inning loss by his former Dodgers team, again to the Giants in the final game of a three-game playoff for the National League pennant in 1962, he was asked by an Adelphi student what he thought of the just concluded game. "Who was playing?" Abrams asked in all sincerity. In the 1990s, he was working for the Norwegian Cruise Line, giving talks and signing photographs (Brooklyn) while emphasizing his two outstanding on-base percentage seasons.

== Death ==
Abrams died in 1997 after suffering a heart attack in Fort Lauderdale, Florida. He was buried in his Brooklyn Dodgers uniform in the Garden of Moses section of the Star of David Cemetery in North Lauderdale.

== Hall of Fame ==
In 1996 Abrams, who was Jewish, was inducted into the B'nai B'rith Jewish American Sports Hall of Fame, in Washington, D.C.

== See also ==
- List of Jewish Major League Baseball players
