= Lyman, Washington =

- Town
- Location of Lyman, Washington
- Coordinates: 48°31′23″N 122°03′48″W
- Country: United States
- State: Washington
- County: Skagit

Government
  - Type: Mayor–council
  - Mayor: Eddie Hills

Area
  - Total: 0.76 sq mi (1.98 km^{2})
  - Land: 0.67 sq mi (1.74 km^{2})
  - Water: 0.093 sq mi (0.24 km^{2})
- Elevation: 69 ft (21 m)

Population (2020)
  - Total: 423
  - Density: 630/sq mi (243/km^{2})
- Time zone: UTC-8 (Pacific (PST))
  - Summer (DST): UTC-7 (PDT)
- ZIP Code: 98263
- Area code: 360, 564
- FIPS code: 53-40770
- GNIS feature ID: 2412927
- Website: Town of Lyman

Lyman is a town in Skagit County, Washington, United States. The population was 423 at the 2020 census. It is included in the Mount Vernon-Anacortes, Washington Metropolitan Statistical Area.

== History ==
Prior to American settlement, the Chobaabish (Lushootseed: čubəʔabš) band of the Skagit people had two winter houses around what is now Lyman. One winter longhouse was located close to the present town, along Lyman Slough (Lushootseed: yət̕ič). Another winter longhouse was located across the Skagit River, at the mouth of Day Creek (Lushootseed: sk̓ʷəb).

Lyman's first postmaster, B.L. Lyman, named the town for himself. Lyman was officially incorporated on May 8, 1909. Floodwaters in the channel, eroded a hundred feet of property during November 2017.

== Geography ==
According to the United States Census Bureau, the town has a total area of 0.76 square miles (1.97 km^{2}), of which, 0.67 square miles (1.74 km^{2}) is land and 0.09 square miles (0.23 km^{2}) is water.

== Demographics ==
Historical population
Census	Pop.	Note	%±
1910	441		—
1920	492		11.6%
1930	441		−10.4%
1940	376		−14.7%
1950	378		0.5%
1960	400		5.8%
1970	324		−19.0%
1980	285		−12.0%
1990	275		−3.5%
2000	409		48.7%
2010	438		7.1%
2020	423		−3.4%
U.S. Decennial Census

=== 2010 census ===
As of the 2010 census, there were 438 people, 160 households, and 111 families living in the town. The population density was 653.7 inhabitants per square mile (252.4/km^{2}). There were 172 housing units at an average density of 256.7 per square mile (99.1/km^{2}). The racial makeup of the town was 95.4% White, 1.4% Native American, 0.2% Asian, 1.8% from other races, and 1.1% from two or more races. Hispanic or Latino of any race were 3.4% of the population.

There were 160 households, of which 40.0% had children under the age of 18 living with them, 52.5% were married couples living together, 8.1% had a female householder with no husband present, 8.8% had a male householder with no wife present, and 30.6% were non-families. 18.8% of all households were made up of individuals, and 8.1% had someone living alone who was 65 years of age or older. The average household size was 2.74 and the average family size was 3.12.

The median age in the town was 36.1 years. 25.3% of residents were under the age of 18; 7.7% were between the ages of 18 and 24; 29.2% were from 25 to 44; 26% were from 45 to 64; and 11.6% were 65 years of age or older. The gender makeup of the town was 49.3% male and 50.7% female.

=== 2000 census ===
As of the 2000 census, there were 409 people, 161 households, and 105 families living in the town. The population density was 621.2 people per square mile (239.3/km^{2}). There were 173 housing units at an average density of 262.8 per square mile (101.2/km^{2}). The racial makeup of the town was 95.60% White, 0.98% African American, 1.47% Native American, 0.24% Asian, and 1.71% from two or more races. Hispanic or Latino of any race were 0.73% of the population.

There were 161 households, out of which 28.0% had children under the age of 18 living with them, 50.9% were married couples living together, 7.5% had a female householder with no husband present, and 34.2% were non-families. 25.5% of all households were made up of individuals, and 9.3% had someone living alone who was 65 years of age or older. The average household size was 2.54 and the average family size was 2.99.

In the town, the age distribution of the population shows 25.7% under the age of 18, 8.6% from 18 to 24, 30.6% from 25 to 44, 24.0% from 45 to 64, and 11.2% who were 65 years of age or older. The median age was 37 years. For every 100 females, there were 98.5 males. For every 100 females age 18 and over, there were 98.7 males.

The median income for a household in the town was $34,318, and the median income for a family was $40,625. Males had a median income of $34,583 versus $25,417 for females. The per capita income for the town was $17,014. About 11.3% of families and 15.7% of the population were below the poverty line, including 27.1% of those under age 18 and none of those age 65 or over.

== Education ==
The town is served by the Sedro-Woolley School District.

== Notable person ==
- Niles Jordan, baseball player
