= Eddie Kazak =

American baseball player (1920–1999)

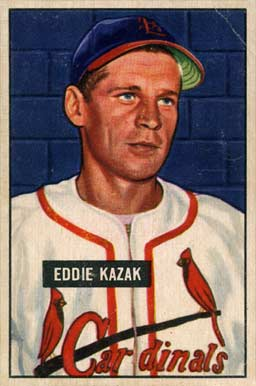
- Third baseman
- Born: July 18, 1920; Steubenville, Ohio, U.S.
- Died: December 15, 1999 (aged 79); Austin, Texas, U.S.
- Batted: Right Threw: Right

MLB debut
- September 29, 1948, for the St. Louis Cardinals

Last MLB appearance
- July 1, 1952, for the Cincinnati Reds

MLB statistics
- Batting average: .273
- Home runs: 11
- Runs batted in: 71
- Stats at Baseball Reference

Teams
- St. Louis Cardinals (1948–1952); Cincinnati Reds (1952)

Career highlights and awards
- All-Star (1949)

Edward Terrance Kazak (July 18, 1920 – December 15, 1999) was an American professional baseball player. Of Polish descent, he played in Major League Baseball (MLB) as a third baseman from 1948 to 1952, most prominently as a member of the St. Louis Cardinals.

After suffering serious injuries during World War II, Kazak recovered to become a Major League Baseball player where, he played in the 1949 All-Star Game as a 28-year-old rookie. Injuries prematurely ended his playing career after just five seasons. He played his final season with the Cincinnati Reds.

== Baseball career ==
Born Edward Terrance Tkaczuk in Steubenville, Ohio, Kazak graduated from Cecil Township High School in 1938, where he played both baseball and soccer. He played sandlot baseball and played in the Georgia–Florida League for a few years, boasting a batting average of .378 in 1941 when with Albany, the team that won the Georgia-Florida pennant.

After the end of the 1942 season on October 1, Kazak entered the military and enlisted with the United States Army. He was originally stationed in Brooks Field, Texas, then joined the paratroopers in 1943. In 1944, Kazak left the United States for Europe. After the Invasion of Normandy, Kazak sustained a bayonet wound to his left arm and had his right elbow shattered by shrapnel. As a result, he spent 18 months in hospitals recovering and enduring numerous operations, including one where a plastic patch was put in place of the missing bone in his elbow. By the time he was released in December 1945, his doctors has told him to forget about baseball.

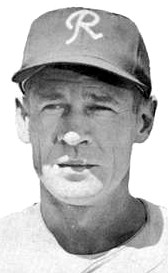
Kazakin as a member of the PCL Seattle Rainiers in 1959.

In 1946, Kazak spent the season in the South Atlantic League, playing for the Columbus Cardinals. In 1947, he played for the Omaha Cardinals of the Western League and the Rochester Red Wings of the International League. Though he has been a second baseman throughout his career, he moved to third base while playing for Rochester in 1948. By the end of the season, Kazak was promoted to the major leagues.

Kazak made his major league debut on September 29, 1948, and played in six games with 22 at bats during the 1948 season. The 1949 season was Kazak's best statistical season. In 92 games, he had a career-high batting average of .304, 6 home runs, and 3 triples.

When Kazak was named the starting third baseman for the National League team in the 1949 Major League Baseball All-Star Game, he became only the fourth rookie player in MLB history to start in an All-Star Game after Joe DiMaggio (1936), Dick Wakefield (1943) and Richie Ashburn (1948). However, Kazak was later injured and lost his starting job to Tommy Glaviano, becoming a pinch hitter during the 1950 season. He had 207 at-bats in 93 games during the 1950 season, and led the National League with 42 pinch hit at-bats. Kazak only played 11 games the following season, and after playing three games in 1952, he was traded along with Wally Westlake from the Cardinals to the Reds for Dick Sisler and Virgil Stallcup on May 13, 1952. However, Kazak only had one hit in 13 games as a member of the Reds, which marked the end of his Major League career.

Kazak continued to play baseball after his major league career was over. He played his last professional game at the age of 40 in 1960 while playing for Austin in the Texas League. He died in Austin, Texas on December 15, 1999.
