= Matt Drews =

American former baseball pitcher (born 1974)

- Pitcher
- Born: August 29, 1974 (age 52); Sarasota, Florida, U.S.
- Bats: Right Throws: Right
- Stats at Baseball Reference

Matthew Ross Drews (born August 29, 1974) is an American former minor league baseball pitcher.

== Career ==
Drews played high school baseball at Sarasota High School, where he had a 10-2 win–loss record with a 1.27 earned run average (ERA) his senior high year, with 125 strikeouts in 88 innings pitched. He signed a letter of intent with the University of Texas at Austin.

Drews was considered by Baseball America to be the top high school pitcher available in the 1993 Major League Baseball draft. The Yankees selected Drews in the first round, thirteenth overall. He signed late, for a $620,000 bonus, and did not play for the Yankees system that year.

Assigned to the Oneonta Yankees in 1994, Drews went 7-6 with a 2.10 ERA, walked 19 and struck out 69 in 90 frames. Drews led the New York–Penn League in ERA and was selected as the 2nd-best prospect in the league by managers. With the Tampa Yankees in 1995, Drews won 15 of 22 decisions and posted a 2.27 ERA. He led the league in wins, innings (182) and starts (28), was second in strikeouts (140) and third in ERA. Managers again picked him as the #2 prospect (behind Scott Rolen). He made the Florida State League All-Star team as one of the top two right-handed pitchers; Shane Bowers was the other.

Rated by Baseball America as the Yankees' #3 prospect (after Rubén Rivera and Derek Jeter) entering 1996 and 12th in all of baseball, Drews went 1-3 with a 4.50 ERA for the Norwich Navigators, 0-4 with an 8.41 for the Columbus Clippers and 0-3 with a 7.13 ERA for Tampa. He walked 72 and struck out 56 in 84 innings. He was traded to the Detroit Tigers along with Rubén Sierra for Cecil Fielder. In Detroit's system, he went 0-4 with a 4.35 ERA for the Jacksonville Suns to complete a 1-14 season.

In 1997, Drews (picked as the #9 Tigers prospect by BA entering the year) was 8-11, 5.49 for Jacksonville and 0-2, 6.60 for the Toledo Mud Hens. The former control specialist continued to walk many batters, issuing 14 free passes in 15 innings with Toledo. He was drafted by the Arizona Diamondbacks in the second round of the 1997 expansion draft but sent back to the Tigers in a deal for Travis Fryman. In 1998, Drews was 5-17 with a 6.57 ERA for Toledo, allowing over 250 baserunners in under 150 innings. He managed to avoid leading the International League in losses, as teammate Mike Drumright dropped 19 decisions, though Drews did lead in hit batsmen (16).

Drews went 2-14 with an 8.27 ERA for Toledo in 1999, with a WHIP of 1.93. He led the IL in losses, runs allowed (136), earned runs allowed (125) and walks (91). With the 2000 Durham Bulls, Drews allowed 4 runs, 4 walks and no hits in two-thirds of an inning. Overall, the former 1st-round draft pick went 38-71 in his pro career, 16-58 after his first two years.

== Personal ==
Drews is the grandson of former major leaguer Karl Drews. Drews has two biological sons and an adopted daughter, named August, Eli, and Sophia.
