= 1949 Major League Baseball All-Star Game =

1949 American baseball competition

	1	2	3	4	5	6	7	8	9	R	H	E
American League	4	0	0	2	0	2	3	0	0	11	13	1
National League	2	1	2	0	0	2	0	0	0	7	12	5
- Date: July 12, 1949
- Venue: Ebbets Field
- City: Brooklyn, New York
- Managers: Lou Boudreau (CLE); Billy Southworth (BSN)
- Attendance: 32,577
- Television: CBS
- TV announcers: Red Barber
- Radio: Mutual
- Radio announcers: Mel Allen and Jim Britt

The 1949 Major League Baseball All-Star Game was the 16th annual midseason exhibition game for Major League Baseball all-stars between the American League (AL) and the National League (NL). The AL continued its early dominance of the Midsummer Classic with an 11–7 win at Ebbets Field in Brooklyn, New York City, home field of the NL's Brooklyn Dodgers. The win moved the AL's all-time record in the game to 12–4.

The 1949 All-Star Game was the first to have African Americans in the line-up. Jackie Robinson of the Dodgers started for the NL at second base, while his teammates catcher Roy Campanella and pitcher Don Newcombe also played for the NL. Cleveland Indians' outfielder Larry Doby played the final four innings of the game for the AL. Eddie Kazak became only the fourth rookie player in MLB history to start in an All-Star Game after Joe DiMaggio, (1939), Dick Wakefield, (1943) and Richie Ashburn, (1948).

== Dodgers in the game ==
The Dodgers hosted the game and were well-represented. Pee Wee Reese and Jackie Robinson were starting infielders for the NL. Ralph Branca, Don Newcombe, and Preacher Roe were on the pitching staff, while Roy Campanella and Gil Hodges were reserve position players. All of the Dodgers' representatives, with the exception of Branca, played in the game.

== Starting lineups ==
Players in italics have since been inducted into the National Baseball Hall of Fame.

=== American League ===
- Dom DiMaggio, rf
- George Kell, 3b
- Ted Williams, lf
- Joe DiMaggio, cf - starting in place of Tommy Henrich, due to injury
- Eddie Joost, ss
- Eddie Robinson, 1b
- Cass Michaels, 2b
- Birdie Tebbetts, c
- Mel Parnell, p
- Lou Brissie, p
- Vic Raschi, p
- Virgil Trucks, p

=== National League ===
- Pee Wee Reese, ss
- Jackie Robinson, 2b
- Stan Musial, cf
- Ralph Kiner, lf
- Johnny Mize, 1b
- Willard Marshall, rf
- Eddie Kazak, 3b
- Andy Seminick, c
- Warren Spahn, p

=== Umpires ===
Position	Umpire	League
Home Plate	Al Barlick	National
First Base	Cal Hubbard	American
Second Base	Artie Gore	National
Third Base	Bill Summers	American
Left Field	Lee Ballanfant	National
Right Field	Bill Grieve	American

The umpires changed assignments in the middle of the fifth inning – Gore and Hubbard swapped positions, while Barlick left the game, Summers moved behind the plate, and Ballanfant move to third base. This was the first All-Star Game to field a 6-man umpiring crew, although after Barlick's departure the remainder of the game was played without an umpire in right field.

== Synopsis ==
Tuesday, July 12, 1949 1:30 pm (ET) at Ebbets Field in Brooklyn, New York
Team	1	2	3	4	5	6	7	8	9	R	H	E
American League	4	0	0	2	0	2	3	0	0	11	13	1
National League	2	1	2	0	0	2	0	0	0	7	12	5
WP: Virgil Trucks (1–0) LP: Don Newcombe (0–1) Sv: Vic Raschi (1); Home runs: AL: None; NL: Stan Musial (1), Ralph Kiner (1)

The starting pitchers were Mel Parnell of the Boston Red Sox for the AL, and Warren Spahn of the Boston Braves for the NL.

The AL opened a high scoring game in the top of the 1st inning; with a man on first (who reached on an error) and two outs, a sequence of single-walk-single-error-single pushed across 4 runs. The NL got 2 runs back in the bottom of the inning, with a double from Jackie Robinson followed by a home run by Stan Musial. In the bottom of the 2nd, the NL cut the AL's lead to 4–3; with bases loaded and no outs, Don Newcombe hit a lineout to left field that Willard Marshall scored on, but the NL was unable to score more as the next batter grounded into a double play. The NL then pulled ahead 5–4 by scoring twice in the bottom of the third, on two walks and three singles during the inning.

The AL pulled back ahead 6–5 in the top of the 4th inning; with men on second and third with two out, Eddie Joost hit a single to score both runners. The AL's lead was extended to 8–5 in the top of the 6th inning; with runners on first and third with one out, Joe DiMaggio drove in both men with a double. Ralph Kiner of the NL hit a two-run home run in the bottom of the 6th inning, which cut the AL lead to 8–7. The AL extended their lead in the top of the 7th inning; with a man on second and two out, a sequence of single-single-double scored three runs. That brought the AL lead to 11–7, and completed the scoring for the game.

The game wasn't crisp defensively, as there were six errors, five of them by the NL. All four of the AL's runs in the first inning were unearned.

Detroit Tigers pitcher Virgil Trucks got the win, and Vic Raschi of the New York Yankees earned a save, while the Brooklyn Dodgers' Don Newcombe took the loss.
