= Virgil Trucks =

American baseball player (1917–2013)

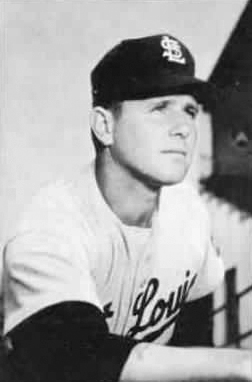
- Trucks with the St. Louis Browns
- Pitcher
- Born: April 26, 1917; Birmingham, Alabama, U.S.
- Died: March 23, 2013 (aged 95); Calera, Alabama, U.S.
- Batted: Right Threw: Right

MLB debut
- September 27, 1941, for the Detroit Tigers

Last MLB appearance
- September 26, 1958, for the New York Yankees

MLB statistics
- Win–loss record: 177–135
- Earned run average: 3.39
- Strikeouts: 1,534
- Stats at Baseball Reference

Teams
- Detroit Tigers (1941–1943, 1945–1952); St. Louis Browns (1953); Chicago White Sox (1953–1955); Detroit Tigers (1956); Kansas City Athletics (1957–1958); New York Yankees (1958)

Career highlights and awards
- 2× All-Star (1949, 1954); 2× World Series champion (1945, 1960); MLB strikeout leader (1949); Pitched two no-hitters

Virgil Oliver "Fire" Trucks (April 26, 1917 – March 23, 2013) was an American professional baseball pitcher in Major League Baseball with the Detroit Tigers, St. Louis Browns, Chicago White Sox, Kansas City Athletics and New York Yankees between 1941 and 1958. He batted and threw right-handed.

A native of Birmingham, Alabama, Trucks posted a 177–135 win–loss record with 1,534 strikeouts and a 3.39 ERA in 2,682.2 innings pitched over a 17-year career.

Trucks was a two-time All-Star and a two-time league leader in shutouts. In 1952, Trucks became the third major leaguer to throw two no-hitters in a season. After his playing career, Trucks coached for several years in the major leagues. At the time of his death in March 2013, he was one of the oldest living former major league players.

== Career ==
The Detroit Tigers signed Trucks as an amateur in 1938. In his first pro season, Trucks set a minor league record with 418 strikeouts. He also threw four no-hitters in the minors. He debuted with the Tigers in the fall of 1941.

Trucks missed two seasons due to military service in World War II and was discharged from the Navy less than two weeks before his start in the second game of the 1945 World Series. Because of the war and returning servicemen, the American and National Leagues waived the rule requiring players to have been on the team's roster by September 1 to qualify for post-season play. He defeated the Chicago Cubs in that game. At the time of his death, he was the last living pitcher to face the Cubs in a World Series game. The only other pitcher to win a post-season game without winning a regular season game is Chris Carpenter of the 2012 St. Louis Cardinals.

In 1949, Trucks was selected for the MLB All-Star Game and he led the league in shutouts and strikeouts. In 1952, despite a 5–19 record and the Detroit Tigers' equally terrible 50-104-2 record, Trucks became just the third major league pitcher to hurl two no-hitters in one season (three others have since matched the feat). He won both no-hitters by a score of 1-0, beating the Washington Senators on May 15 and the New York Yankees on August 25. In the 1953 season, Trucks recorded a 20-10 record, 149 strikeouts and a 2.93 ERA and finished fifth in AL MVP voting. He had been traded early that season from the St. Louis Browns to the Chicago White Sox, becoming one of a small number of pitchers traded during a 20-win season. He earned his second All-Star distinction in 1954, a year in which he led the AL in shutouts for a second time.

Along with his two no-hitters in his major league career, Trucks has also thrown four one-hitters and four two-hitters.

=== Coaching ===
After retiring as a player, Trucks joined the coaching staff of the Pittsburgh Pirates, winning the 1960 World Series with them against his old team, the Yankees. He continued coaching with the Pirates, then coached the Atlanta Braves and ended his MLB career with the Tigers in 1974.

== Personal life ==
Trucks was the uncle of Butch Trucks, a founding member of The Allman Brothers Band, and Chris Trucks. Trucks' great nephew, Derek (Chris' son) played guitar in the final lineup up the Allman Brothers Band and co-leads the Tedeschi Trucks Band with his wife Susan Tedeschi. Another other great-nephew Duane is the drummer for Widespread Panic.

== Later life ==
Trucks was inducted into the Alabama Sports Hall of Fame in 1974 and into the Michigan Sports Hall of Fame in 1985.

In the summer of 2012, Trucks was injured in a fall, but he made a recovery. He died on March 23, 2013, at the age of 95 in Calera, Alabama. He had been hospitalized with pneumonia shortly before his death.

== See also ==
- List of Major League Baseball annual strikeout leaders
- List of Major League Baseball no-hitters

Achievements
| Preceded by Allie Reynolds; Carl Erskine | No-hitter pitcher May 15, 1952; August 25, 1952 | Succeeded by Carl Erskine; Bobo Holloman |
