= Virgil Stallcup =

American baseball player (1922–1989)

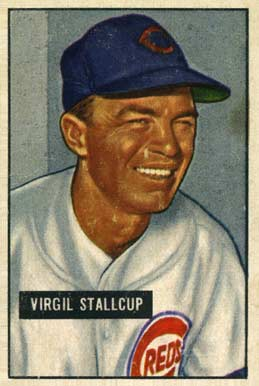
- Shortstop
- Born: January 3, 1922; Swain County, North Carolina, U.S.
- Died: May 2, 1989 (aged 67); Greenville, South Carolina, U.S.
- Batted: Right Threw: Right

MLB debut
- April 18, 1947, for the Cincinnati Reds

Last MLB appearance
- April 25, 1953, for the St. Louis Cardinals

MLB statistics
- Batting average: .241
- Home runs: 22
- Runs batted in: 214
- Stats at Baseball Reference

Teams
- Cincinnati Reds (1947–1952); St. Louis Cardinals (1952–1953)

Thomas Virgil Stallcup (January 3, 1922 – May 2, 1989) was an American professional baseball shortstop who played in seven Major League seasons from 1947 through 1953. Nicknamed "Red", the native of Honea Path, South Carolina, threw and batted right-handed, stood 6 feet 3 inches (1.91 m) tall and weighed 185 pounds (84 kg).

Stallcup attended Clemson University. He was originally signed by the Boston Red Sox before World War II, and was selected by the Cincinnati Reds in the Rule 5 draft after the 1946 season, when Stallcup batted .304 in the Class B Piedmont League. After his debut with the Reds on April 18, 1947, he was sent to the Jersey City Giants for seasoning, and he responded by hitting .338 with 15 home runs in 76 games. From 1948 to 1951, Stallcup was Cincinnati's starting shortstop, but he never batted higher than .254; he twice hit eight home runs in a season. During the 1951 season, he was platooned with 21-year-old Roy McMillan, though he still saw the majority of the action at shortstop. However, the following season, McMillan became the everyday shortstop. Stallcup was traded along with Dick Sisler from the Reds to the St. Louis Cardinals for Wally Westlake and Eddie Kazak on May 13, 1952. He ended his MLB career as a utility infielder. Overall, Stallcup batted .241 with 22 home runs in 587 games.

After briefly managing in minor league baseball, Stallcup left the game. He died at age 67 by suicide in Greenville, South Carolina, by shooting himself in the chest.

Stallcup is featured in Death in Vegas music video for the song Dirge.
