= Wally Westlake =

American baseball player (1920–2019)

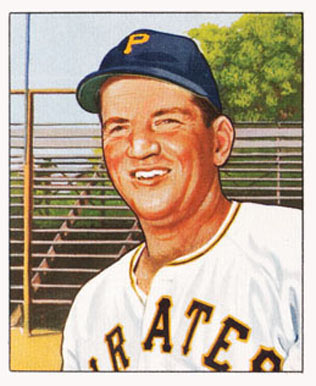
- Outfielder
- Born: November 8, 1920; Gridley, California, U.S.
- Died: September 5, 2019 (aged 98); Sacramento, California, U.S.
- Batted: Right Threw: Right

MLB debut
- April 15, 1947, for the Pittsburgh Pirates

Last MLB appearance
- May 12, 1956, for the Philadelphia Phillies

MLB statistics
- Batting average: .272
- Home runs: 127
- Runs batted in: 539
- Stats at Baseball Reference

Teams
- Pittsburgh Pirates (1947–1951); St. Louis Cardinals (1951–1952); Cincinnati Reds (1952); Cleveland Indians (1952–1955); Baltimore Orioles (1955); Philadelphia Phillies (1956)

Career highlights and awards
- All-Star (1951)

Waldon Thomas Westlake (November 8, 1920 – September 5, 2019) was an American utility player in Major League Baseball who had a ten-year career from 1947 to 1956.

== Career ==
Born in Gridley, California, Westlake played for the Pittsburgh Pirates, St. Louis Cardinals, Cincinnati Reds and Philadelphia Phillies of the National League, and the Cleveland Indians and Baltimore Orioles of the American League. He primarily played as an outfielder, with some appearances as a third baseman.

Westlake hit for the cycle twice in his career (both while playing for the Pirates), coming almost a year apart; July 30, 1948, against the Brooklyn Dodgers, and June 14, 1949, against the Boston Braves.

He was a member of the National League All-Star team in 1951, entering the game as a defensive replacement in the bottom of the 9th inning. He was traded along with Eddie Kazak from the Cardinals to the Reds for Dick Sisler and Virgil Stallcup on May 13, 1952.

Westlake was a member of the 1954 Cleveland Indians team, who were swept by the New York Giants in the 1954 World Series. He played in two games of the Series, batting 1-for-7 (.143) with one walk. Following the death of teammate Hal Naragon, Westlake was the last surviving player to play with the Indians in the 1954 World Series.

Westlake was acquired along with Dave Pope and cash by the Baltimore Orioles from the Indians for Gene Woodling and Billy Cox before the trade deadline on June 15, 1955.

In 958 regular season games played, Westlake hit .272 with 127 home runs and 539 RBIs. He played 738 games in the National League, and 220 games in the American League. He played 834 games in the outfield, and 34 games at third base (all of his games at third were with the 1951 Pittsburgh Pirates).

On August 26, 1947, Westlake became the first white batter hit by a pitch from a black pitcher - Dan Bankhead of the Brooklyn Dodgers at Ebbets Field.

== Personal life ==
Westlake graduated from Christian Brothers High School in Sacramento. His brother Jim Westlake was also a major league player.

Westlake served in the United States military during World War II. He died on September 5, 2019. He was the second-to-last living player from the 1954 American League champion Indians (after Dick Tomanek), and the last living member who played in the 1954 World Series.

== See also ==
- List of Major League Baseball players to hit for the cycle

Achievements
Preceded by Joe DiMaggio; Jackie Robinson	Hitting for the cycle July 30, 1948; June 14, 1949	Succeeded by Jackie Robinson; Gil Hodges
