= Preacher Roe =

American baseball player (1916–2008)

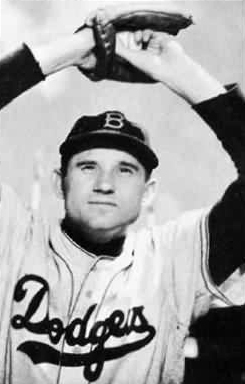
- Roe in 1953
- Pitcher
- Born: February 26, 1916; Ash Flat, Arkansas, U.S.
- Died: November 9, 2008 (aged 92); West Plains, Missouri, U.S.
- Batted: Right Threw: Left

MLB debut
- August 22, 1938, for the St. Louis Cardinals

Last MLB appearance
- September 4, 1954, for the Brooklyn Dodgers

MLB statistics
- Win–loss record: 127–84
- Earned run average: 3.43
- Strikeouts: 956
- Stats at Baseball Reference

Teams
- St. Louis Cardinals (1938); Pittsburgh Pirates (1944–1947); Brooklyn Dodgers (1948–1954)

Career highlights and awards
- 5× All-Star (1945, 1949–1952); NL strikeout leader (1945)

Elwin Charles "Preacher" Roe (February 26, 1916 – November 9, 2008) was an American professional baseball pitcher. He played in Major League Baseball for the St. Louis Cardinals (1938), Pittsburgh Pirates (1944–47), and Brooklyn Dodgers (1948–54). Roe was a five-time All-Star.

== Early years ==
Roe was born on February 26, 1916, in Ash Flat, Arkansas and grew up in Viola, Arkansas. The nickname "Preacher" came at the age of three when an uncle asked his name and Roe responded "preacher" because of a minister who would take him on horse-and-buggy rides. For some time, Roe’s father, Charles Roe, played semi-professional ball for a Pine Bluff, Arkansas team before he began practice as a country doctor.

== College career ==
From 1935 to 1939, Roe attended Harding College (now University). While majoring in education, he received a baseball scholarship and also tried his hand at basketball. At Harding, in a 13-inning game in 1937, Roe gained national attention by striking out 26 batters. The game ended in a 4-4 tie due to darkness.

== Major League Baseball ==
=== St. Louis Cardinals ===
In the summer of 1938, Roe was signed by Branch Rickey, then general manager for the St. Louis Cardinals. Roe pitched in one game for the team that season, giving up six hits, two walks, and four runs in 2 2/3 innings. He spent the next five seasons in the Cardinals' minor league system before being traded to the Pittsburgh Pirates on September 30, 1943 in exchange for pitcher Johnny Podgajny, outfielder Johnny Wyrostek and cash.

=== Pittsburgh Pirates ===
As a fastball pitcher with the Pittsburgh Pirates, Roe had a record of 13–11 with a 3.11 earned run average (ERA) in 1944 and a 14–13 record with a 2.87 ERA in 1945. His 148 strikeouts in the 1945 season led the National League and he was selected for (but did not play in) the 1945 All-Star Game. While coaching high school basketball after the 1945 season, Roe suffered a fractured skull in a fight with a referee. His pitching suffered in the following seasons, with his record falling to 3–8 and an ERA of 5.14 in 1946, and deteriorated further in 1947, as he finished the season with a record of 4–15 and an ERA of 5.25.

Ralph Kiner, he said, stood in a hole in the outfield. He caught balls hit to his hole but otherwise did not field. One can get a flavor of 'Ole Preach', as he was called, by reading Roger Kahn's book The Boys of Summer.

=== Brooklyn Dodgers ===
Branch Rickey, the general manager of the Brooklyn Dodgers, remembered Roe from Rickey's time in the Cardinals' management and engineered a trade. On December 8, 1947, the Dodgers got Roe, and infielders Billy Cox and Gene Mauch in exchange for pitchers Hal Gregg and Vic Lombardi and outfielder Dixie Walker.

With his health improving and with the spitball now in his repertoire, Roe had much success with the Dodgers, including winning records in his first six seasons with the team. Roe finished the 1948 season with a record of 12–8 and an ERA of 2.63.

Selected to play in the 1949 All-Star Game, Roe pitched in the ninth inning, retiring all three batters he faced. He improved further in the 1949 season, finishing with a 15–6 record and a 2.79 ERA. He pitched for the first time in the postseason in the 1949 World Series, winning Game 2 with a six-hit complete game shutout against the New York Yankees that the Dodgers won 1–0, their only win in the five game series.

Roe posted an exceptional 22–3 win-loss record for the Dodgers in 1951, becoming only the fifth pitcher since 1916 to begin the season 10–0. He had a winning percentage of 88% in the season. Had he not lost his second-to-last start of the year (he got a no-decision in his last start), he would have become the first pitcher ever with a winning percentage above 90% in a 20-win season (as it turned out, no pitcher has ever gone on to win 90% of their games for a 20-win season since Roe's near miss).

Roe was an exceptional pitcher, but notorious as a poor hitter, finishing his career with a .110 batting average. In 1953, he hit a home run at Forbes Field in Pittsburgh, the only one of his career, causing fans to roar in surprise and delight. Dodger broadcaster Red Barber told his radio audience, "Well, old Number 28 has hit a home run, and we'll never hear the end of it, folks!"

Roe was still pitching in the majors at age 39, unusual at the time, and was the third-oldest player in the National League in the 1954 season, his last in the majors. When asked to explain his longevity, he replied "Clean livin' and the spitball." He described his methodology in a 1955 article in Sports Illustrated, "The Outlawed Spitball Was My Money Pitch", published a year after he retired. He was acquired along with Billy Cox by the Baltimore Orioles from the Dodgers on December 14, 1954 for a pair of minor-leaguers, infielder Harry Schwegman and right-handed pitcher John Jancse, and $60,000.

Roe's overall career statistics were hurt by the fact that he was away from baseball during World War II and that for two of the years he pitched for the Pirates they were among the worst teams in the National League. Contrasting the fielding of the Dodgers and the Pirates, he once said that a pitcher should pay to pitch for the Dodgers, whereas the Pirates' second baseman and shortstop were like goalposts with the ball bouncing between them. After being taken out of a game in the second inning, Roe commented that, "Sometimes you eat the bear and sometimes the bear eats you."

Willie Mays said of Roe, "We used to say he had two fastball speeds—slow, and slower." Sal Maglie, star pitcher for the Giants, said Roe used to have a slow fastball: "Believe me, it really wasn't fast at all." Maglie noted that Roe would strike out hitters with it, though, by throwing it after a bunch of slower pitches, as this messed with the hitter's timing.

== After baseball ==
Roe lived in West Plains, Missouri, where for many years he operated a small grocery store (now home to another grocery store, The Truck Patch) on the northeast corner of Broadway and Porter Wagoner Boulevard, and has a street named after him (Preacher Roe Boulevard), which included U.S. 160 north of the US 63 bypass until the city rerouted U.S. 160 and Route 17 after 2000. U.S. Route 160 still runs as Preacher Roe Boulevard south of U.S. 63. A favorite son of West Plains, Roe was the subject of a 1984 cover story written by Terry Fuhrmann Hampton for Issue #26 of the West Plains Gazette magazine. There is an image of him on a mural inside the Ozark Heritage Welcome Center, located in West Plains.

A community ball field in Salem, Fulton County, Arkansas, 18 miles (29 km) from Roe's birthplace of Ash Flat, is known as Preacher Roe Park.

The book Carl Erskine's Tales from the Dodgers Dugout: Extra Innings (2004) includes short stories from former Dodger pitcher Carl Erskine. Roe is prominent in many of these stories.

Roe died on November 9, 2008, from colon cancer.

== See also ==
- List of Major League Baseball annual strikeout leaders

Preceded by Carl Erskine	Brooklyn Dodgers Opening Day; Starting pitcher 1952	Succeeded by Carl Erskine
