= Niles Jordan =

American baseball player (1925–2008)

- Pitcher
- Born: December 1, 1925; Lyman, Washington, U.S.
- Died: March 15, 2008 (aged 82); Sedro-Woolley, Washington, U.S.
- Batted: Left Threw: Left

MLB debut
- August 26, 1951, for the Philadelphia Phillies

Last MLB appearance
- September 16, 1952, for the Cincinnati Reds

MLB statistics
- Win–loss record: 2–4
- Earned run average: 4.19
- Innings pitched: 43
- Stats at Baseball Reference

Teams
- Philadelphia Phillies (1951); Cincinnati Reds (1952)

Niles Chapman Jordan (December 1, 1925 – March 15, 2008) was an American professional baseball player, a pitcher who appeared in Major League Baseball during the 1951 and 1952 seasons for the Philadelphia Phillies and Cincinnati Reds. Listed at 5 feet 11 inches (1.80 m) and 180 pounds (82 kg), he batted and threw left-handed.

A native of Lyman, Washington, Jordan attended Sedro-Woolley High School before enlisting the United States Navy upon graduation in 1943. He served on the destroyer USS Bennett, taking part at the battles of Iwo Jima and Okinawa. On April 7, 1945, Jordan survived a hit from a Japanese kamikaze fighter on the Bennett.

Jordan later pitched for the Sedro-Woolley in the local city league and in 1948 was signed by the Philadelphia Phillies. He was sent to the Klamath Falls Gems of the Far West League where, in 1949, he finished with a 19–7 mark and a 4.35 ERA. In 1950 he was promoted to the Terre Haute Phillies of the Three-I League where he was 17–6, and then enjoyed his best season with Wilmington of the Interstate League in 1951, going 21–3 with 20 complete games (including two one-hitters) and earned a late-season call-up to Philadelphia. Before the 1952 season, he was obtained by the Cincinnati Reds along with Eddie Pellagrini, Andy Seminick and Dick Sisler in the same transaction that brought Connie Ryan, Smoky Burgess and Howie Fox to the Phillies.

In a two-season career, Jordan posted a 2–4 record with a 4.19 ERA in eight appearances, including a shutout, giving up 22 runs (two unearned) on 49 hits and 11 walks while striking out 13 in 43.0 innings of work.

Following his baseball career, Jordan returned to Sedro Woolley, Washington, just miles from his birthplace, where he worked in the lumber industry for many years. He died in the Life Care Center of Skagit Valley at the age of 82.
