= Bob Borkowski =

American baseball player (1926–2017)

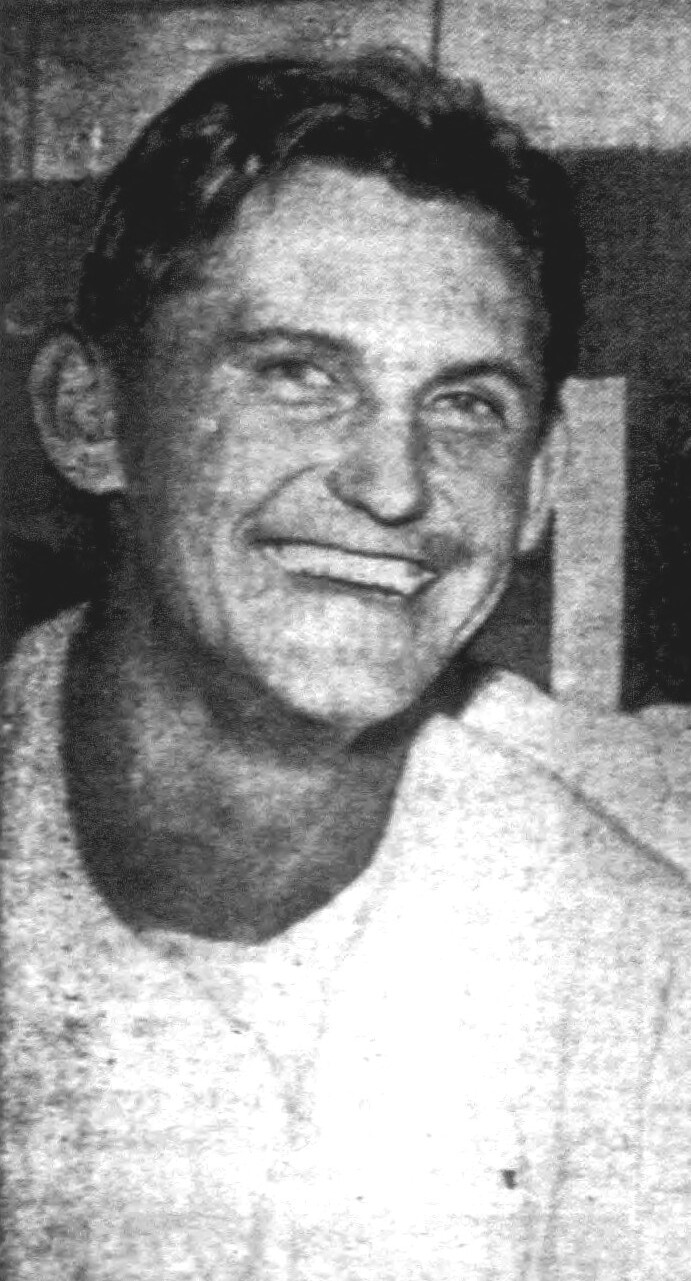
- Borkowski in 1953
- Outfielder
- Born: January 27, 1926; Dayton, Ohio, U.S.
- Died: November 18, 2017 (aged 91); Dayton, Ohio, U.S.
- Batted: Right Threw: Right

MLB debut
- April 22, 1950, for the Chicago Cubs

Last MLB appearance
- July 10, 1955, for the Brooklyn Dodgers

MLB statistics
- Batting average: .251
- Home runs: 16
- Runs batted in: 112
- Stats at Baseball Reference

Teams
- Chicago Cubs (1950–1951); Cincinnati Reds / Redlegs (1952–1955); Brooklyn Dodgers (1955)

Robert Vilarian Borkowski (January 27, 1926 – November 18, 2017) was an American outfielder in Major League Baseball who played from 1950 to 1955 with the Chicago Cubs, Cincinnati Reds and Brooklyn Dodgers. Listed at 6' 0" (1.83 m), 182 lb. (83 kg), Borkowski batted and threw right-handed. He was born and died in Dayton, Ohio.

Borkowski originally signed with the Cubs as a pitcher in 1946. In his first professional season, he posted an 18–9 record with a 3.46 ERA in the Class-D Appalachian League. He also played nearly 100 games in the outfield and hit a .384 batting average in 104 games. Borkowski was then converted into a full-time outfielder.

In 1949, Borkowski batted .376 with the Nashville Vols to win the Double-A Southern Association batting title, gaining a promotion to the Cubs the following season. Overall, Borkowski hit .273 and slugged .379 in 85 games as a rookie. Nevertheless, in 1951 he slumped badly with the Cubs and was traded to Cincinnati, where he played his only full major league season in 1952. After that, Borkowski was dealt to the Dodgers in 1955 and hit .105 in nine games before being sent down to the minors. He then played three seasons in AAA before retiring from baseball in 1958.

In 470 games over six seasons, Borkowski posted a .251 batting average (294-for-1170) with 126 runs, 16 home runs and 112 RBIs. Defensively, he recorded a .980 fielding percentage playing at all three outfield positions and first base.

Borkowski died on November 18, 2017, at the age of 91.
