= Kent Peterson (baseball) =

American baseball player (1925–1995)

- Pitcher
- Born: December 21, 1925; Goshen, Utah, U.S.
- Died: April 27, 1995 (aged 69); Highland, Utah, U.S.
- Batted: Right Threw: Left

MLB debut
- July 15, 1944, for the Cincinnati Reds

Last MLB appearance
- July 18, 1953, for the Philadelphia Phillies

MLB statistics
- Win–loss record: 13–38
- Earned run average: 4.95
- Strikeouts: 208
- Stats at Baseball Reference

Teams
- Cincinnati Reds (1944, 1947–1951); Philadelphia Phillies (1952–1953)

Kent Franklin Peterson (December 21, 1925 – April 27, 1995) was an American professional baseball player. The left-handed pitcher appeared in 147 games during all or part of eight seasons in Major League Baseball (1944, 1947–53) for the Cincinnati Reds and Philadelphia Phillies. Born in Goshen, Utah, he was listed as 5 feet 10 inches (1.78 m) tall and 170 pounds (77 kg).

Peterson signed with Cincinnati in 1944 and worked in one MLB game for the Reds that season, hurling a scoreless inning against the future World Series champion St. Louis Cardinals and retiring the Redbirds in order on July 15. He then entered the United States Army and performed World War II military service, missing the full seasons of 1945–46. At age 21 he returned to the Reds in 1947 and was a "swing man", splitting his time between starting and relief assignments, through 1949. Pitching for a second-division team, Peterson was able to win only 12 of 45 decisions over those three years, a winning percentage of .267. In 1948, he won two games while losing 15, finishing third in the National League in games lost. That year Peterson also led the league in hit batsmen with six in only 137 innings pitched. In 1949, his won–lost record improved to 4–5 in 30 games, but his earned run average rose to an ineffective 6.24. It would be Peterson's last full season in the majors.

In 1950, the Reds sent Peterson him to the minor leagues for the first time in his pro career, and he posted a winning record for Triple-A Syracuse. He split time between Cincinnati and the minors in 1950 and 1951, then was traded with outfielder Johnny Wyrostek to the Phillies for right-handed pitcher Bubba Church in May 1952. The Phillies used him in 18 games in relief during 1952 and 1953, sandwiched along with stints in Triple-A. In his final appearance on July 18, 1953, he worked three innings of "mop-up" relief against his former team, Cincinnati. He then played at the top level of the minors through 1956 before leaving baseball.

In the majors, Peterson posted a career record of 13 wins and 38 losses (.255) in his 147 MLB games on the mound, with seven complete games, one shutout (a five-hit, 1–0 triumph over the Cardinals on June 12, 1947), and five saves. In 4201/3 innings pitched, he allowed 434 hits and 215 bases on balls, with 208 strikeouts. His career ERA was 4.95.

He was inducted into the Utah Sports Hall of Fame in 1977.
