= Karl Drews =

American baseball player (1920-1963)

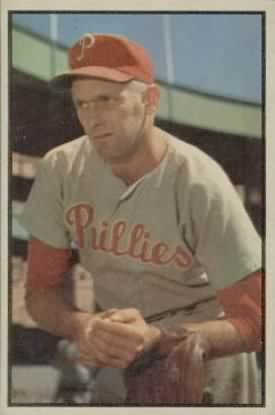
- Pitcher
- Born: February 22, 1920; Staten Island, New York, U.S.
- Died: August 15, 1963 (aged 43); Dania, Florida, U.S.
- Batted: Right Threw: Right

MLB debut
- September 8, 1946, for the New York Yankees

Last MLB appearance
- September 20, 1954, for the Cincinnati Redlegs

MLB statistics
- Win–loss record: 44–53
- Earned run average: 4.76
- Strikeouts: 322
- Stats at Baseball Reference

Teams
- New York Yankees (1946–1948); St. Louis Browns (1948–1949); Philadelphia Phillies (1951–1954); Cincinnati Redlegs (1954)

Career highlights and awards
- World Series champion (1947)

Karl August Drews (February 22, 1920 – August 15, 1963) was an American professional baseball right-handed pitcher, whose baseball career spanned 21 seasons (1939–1959). He played in Major League Baseball (MLB) from 1946 to 1949 and 1951 to 1954 for the New York Yankees, St. Louis Browns, Philadelphia Phillies, and Cincinnati Redlegs. Drews stood 6 feet 4 inches (1.93 m) tall and weighed 192 pounds (87 kg).

A Staten Island, New York native, Drews appeared in two games for the Yankees in the 1947 World Series as a relief pitcher and held the Brooklyn Dodgers to one run and two hits in three innings pitched, although he did allow a base on balls, a hit batsman, and threw a wild pitch. During his MLB career, Drews appeared in 218 games played, 107 as a starting pitcher, and gave up 913 hits and 332 bases on balls in 826 2/3 innings, with 322 strikeouts. In his finest season, with the 1952 Phillies, he finished third in the National League (NL) in shutouts (five), sixth in complete games (15), and seventh in earned run average (ERA) (2.72). Drews won 14 games (losing 15), while appearing in 33 games, 30 as a starter.

On August 15, 1963, Drews was driving his daughter Geraldine to Fort Lauderdale to meet with friends to attend a swim meet in Tallahassee. Their car stalled on Federal Highway in Dania. As Drews worked to push their stopped car off Federal Highway, an intoxicated driver, Earl Richard Johnson of Fort Lauderdale, struck Drews, killing him instantly. His daughter was unhurt. Police charged Johnson with driving while intoxicated, causing an accident and extreme reckless driving. He would be released on $500 bond. On September 20, 1963, a judge fined Johnson $75 and court costs for Drews' death.

His grandson, Matt Drews, is a former Minor League Baseball (MiLB) right-handed pitcher selected by the Yankees in the first round of the June 1993 MLB draft, who played for seven seasons.
