= Eddie Yuhas =

American baseball player (1924–1986)

- Pitcher
- Born: August 5, 1924; Youngstown, Ohio, U.S.
- Died: July 6, 1986 (aged 61); Winston-Salem, North Carolina, U.S.
- Batted: Right Threw: Right

MLB debut
- April 17, 1952, for the St. Louis Cardinals

Last MLB appearance
- April 28, 1953, for the St. Louis Cardinals

MLB statistics
- Win–loss record: 12–2
- Earned run average: 2.87
- Strikeouts: 39
- Stats at Baseball Reference

Teams
- St. Louis Cardinals (1952–1953)

John Edward Yuhas (August 5, 1924 – July 6, 1986) was an American former professional baseball pitcher. Born in Youngstown, Ohio, he appeared in two seasons in Major League Baseball for the St. Louis Cardinals in 1952–53. He batted and threw right-handed during his baseball career.

== Professional career ==
=== Early years ===
Yuhas was signed by the New York Yankees as an amateur free agent in 1942. The New York Yankees traded him to the Cardinals in 1943 in an unknown transaction. After missing several seasons during World War II, he returned in 1947, pitching in the minor leagues for five seasons.

=== Major leagues ===
In 1952, Yuhas made his major league debut with the Cardinals at age 27. In 1952, Yuhas went on to go 12–2, with a 2.72 earned run average. Yuhas led the Cardinals in 1952 with Won-Loss % (.857), games (54), and wild pitches (4). Yuhas' win-loss percentage was also the best in the National League, while his appearances placed him third. In the games category, Yuhas was only behind Joe Black (56), and future Hall of Fame inductee Hoyt Wilhelm. The Cardinals went on to record an 88–66 record in the National League, finishing third in the standings. Yuhas finished in a five-way tie for thirty-first place in the 1952 National League Most Valuable Player voting.

In 1953, however, Yuhas appeared in only 2 games. In one inning, Yuhas had an 18.00 era, with three hits and two earned runs given up before suffering an arm injury that kept him out the rest of the season. With Yuhas out of action, the 1953 Cardinals fell to an 83–71 record. They did, however, maintain third place in the standings.

Yuhas never recovered from his arm trouble, having played in his last game on April 28 of 1953. At the time of his retirement Yuhas had a 12–2 record, a 2.72 ERA, 35 walks, and 39 strikeouts. Yuhas was 4 for 21 hitting, with a lifetime batting average of .190. His lifetime fielding percentage was .947.

Yuhas, along with Ted Williams and Joe DiMaggio, is one of only three players to receive MVP votes in all but one of his Major League seasons.

== See also ==
- List of St. Louis Cardinals team records
