= Johnny Rutherford (baseball) =

Canadian baseball player (1925–2016

- Pitcher
- Born: May 5, 1925; Belleville, Canada
- Died: December 25, 2016 (aged 91); Bloomfield Hills, Michigan, U.S.
- Batted: Left Threw: Right

MLB debut
- April 30, 1952, for the Brooklyn Dodgers

Last MLB appearance
- September 23, 1952, for the Brooklyn Dodgers

MLB statistics
- Win–loss record: 7–7
- Earned run average: 4.25
- Strikeouts: 29
- Stats at Baseball Reference

Teams
- Brooklyn Dodgers (1952)

John William Rutherford (May 5, 1925 – December 25, 2016) was a Canadian Major League Baseball pitcher.

== Early life and education ==
Born in Belleville, Ontario, Canada, Rutherford grew up in Detroit, Michigan, graduating from Mackenzie High School. After high school, he served with United States Navy during World War II.

== Career ==
Rutherford was signed by the Brooklyn Dodgers as an amateur free agent before the 1947 season and later played for them in 1952. Nicknamed "Doc", the 27-year-old rookie stood 5 ft 10 in (1.78 m) and weighed 170 lb (77 kg). He pitched both as a starter and reliever for the pennant-winning 1952 Dodgers, making his Major League Baseball debut in relief against the St. Louis Cardinals at Sportsman's Park on April 30. His first major league win came a week later, also in relief, in a 5–4 decision over the Cincinnati Reds at Ebbets Field. He got his first start on July 31. For the season he appeared in 22 games with 11 starts, four complete games, 8 games finished, and 2 saves. He won 7, lost 7, and had an earned run average of 4.25. In 97 1/3 innings pitched he gave up 97 hits, struck out 29, and walked 29. At the plate, he batted .290 (9-for-31) with 3 runs batted in and 3 runs scored. In the field he recorded 3 putouts, 24 assists, made no errors, and participated in a double play. He made an appearance in the 1952 World Series, which the New York Yankees won in seven games. He pitched an inning in Game # 4 and gave up a hit (a Mickey Mantle triple) and an earned run.

Prior to his time in the Major Leagues, Rutherford played in the minor leagues including with the Fort Worth Cats where he met and later married his wife, Martha Jo, at the ballpark.

With his baseball career shortened by shoulder problems, Rutherford followed his father's path to the Kirksville College of Osteopathic Medicine in Kirksville, Missouri, receiving his medical degree in 1962, interning at Riverside Hospital in Trenton, Michigan, and building his general practice in the Detroit suburb of River Rouge.

Rutherford's wife, Martha Jo, died on May 16, 2016; he died on December 25, 2016, at the age of 91. He is survived by his daughter, son, and 3 grandchildren.
