= Carl Erskine =

American baseball player (1926–2024)

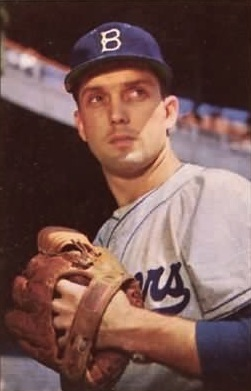
- Erskine with the Brooklyn Dodgers, c. 1953
- Pitcher
- Born: December 13, 1926; Anderson, Indiana, U.S.
- Died: April 16, 2024 (aged 97); Anderson, Indiana, U.S.
- Batted: Right Threw: Right

MLB debut
- July 25, 1948, for the Brooklyn Dodgers

Last MLB appearance
- June 14, 1959, for the Los Angeles Dodgers

MLB statistics
- Win–loss record: 122–78
- Earned run average: 4.00
- Strikeouts: 981
- Stats at Baseball Reference

Teams
- Brooklyn / Los Angeles Dodgers (1948–1959)

Career highlights and awards
- All-Star (1954); World Series champion (1955); Pitched two no-hitters

Carl Daniel Erskine (December 13, 1926 – April 16, 2024), nicknamed "Oisk", was an American professional baseball pitcher in Major League Baseball who played his entire career for the Brooklyn/Los Angeles Dodgers from 1948 through 1959. He was a pitching mainstay on Dodger teams which won five National League pennants and the 1955 World Series.

During the 1953 season, Erskine won 20 games and set a World Series record with 14 strikeouts in a single game. He was an All-Star the following season. Erskine pitched two of the NL's seven no-hitters during the 1950s.

After his baseball career ended, he was active as a business executive and an author. In particular, he was involved deeply with the Special Olympics and charities which aimed at helping people with developmental difficulties such as his son Jimmy, who was born with Down syndrome. Erskine died in 2024, the last surviving member of the "Boys of Summer" Brooklyn teams of the 1950s.

== Early life ==
Erskine was born in Anderson, Indiana, the youngest of three sons. He attended Anderson High School where he was a standout pitcher, attracting the attention of the Brooklyn Dodgers. After graduating, however, he joined the United States Navy in 1945. During his time with the Navy, he was stationed at Boston Navy Yard.

While in Boston, Erskine worked out with the Boston Braves who showed interest in him. However, Erskine remained loyal to the Dodgers and stalled the Braves' general manager John Quinn until an offer came from Dodgers' general manager Branch Rickey who gave him a bonus of $3,500 ($58,000 today) to sign with the Dodgers.

After being discharged from the Navy in 1946, he was declared a free agent by Commissioner Happy Chandler as the Dodgers had violated a directive which forbade Major League teams from signing a player active in the military. After a bidding war between the Boston Red Sox, the Philadelphia Phillies, and the Dodgers, he signed with Brooklyn for another bonus of $5,000 ($83,000 today).

== Career ==
Erskine broke into the majors a year before Don Newcombe, and from 1948 to 1950 was used primarily as a relief pitcher, going 21–10. In 1951, he mixed 19 starts with 27 relief appearances, and went 16–12. Erskine was 14–6 in 1952 with a career-best 2.70 earned run average, then had his 20-win season in 1953, leading the league with a .769 winning percentage along with 187 strikeouts and 16 complete games, all career highs. This was followed by 18–15 in 1954, posting career highs in starts (37) and innings (260 1/3), then by 11–8 in 1955 and 13–11 in 1956.

When Newcombe was pitching in the ninth inning of the third game of the playoff with the New York Giants on October 3, 1951, Erskine and Ralph Branca were warming up in the bullpen. On the recommendation of pitching coach Clyde Sukeforth, who thought that Branca had better stuff, Newcombe was relieved by Branca, who then gave up the game-winning home run to Bobby Thomson. Whenever Erskine was asked what his best pitch was, he replied, "The curveball I bounced in the Polo Grounds bullpen in 1951."

Erskine was a member of the beloved Dodgers team that won the 1955 World Series for the franchise's first Series title. He appeared in eleven World Series games (1949–52–53-55-56), and made the NL All-Star team in 1954. Erskine's 14 strikeouts as the winner of Game 3 of the 1953 Fall Classic – including striking out the side in the ninth inning – broke the Series record of 13 held by Howard Ehmke (1929, Game 1), and stood for 10 years until Sandy Koufax struck out 15 New York Yankees in the first game of the 1963 World Series. He was ineffective in Games 1 and 6, although he was not charged with the losses. From 1951 through 1956, Erskine won 92 games while losing only 58, which helped the Dodgers to four pennants and World Series.

Erskine threw two no-hitters during his career. His first was against the Chicago Cubs on June 19, 1952, during which he walked only one batter, just missing a perfect game. His second no-hitter came against the New York Giants on May 12, 1956. Erskine is one of two Dodger pitchers to throw multiple no-hitters, the other being teammate Sandy Koufax who threw four.

In 1958, the Dodgers moved to Los Angeles. On April 18, Erskine started the home opener at the Los Angeles Coliseum against the San Francisco Giants, who had moved west with their rivals, and won the game 6–5. However, his career in Los Angeles but lasted only a season and a half. He made his final appearance on June 14, 1959. In a twelve-season career, he posted a 122–78 (.610) record with 981 strikeouts and a 4.00 earned run average in 1718 2/3 innings pitched. After retiring, he was made an assistant pitching coach in 1959 and finished the season on the team that went on to win the World Series.

== Post-retirement ==
Following his retirement as a player, Erskine returned to his native Indiana. For the 1960 season, he worked as a color commentator for Saturday-afternoon telecasts of major league games on ABC, teaming with play-by-play announcer Jack Buck. He coached for the college baseball team Anderson College for 12 seasons, including four Hoosier Conference championships, and his 1965 squad went 20–5 and reached the NAIA World Series. He had 18 players named to All-Conference teams, and three named as All-American.

Erskine also became a leader in the community, participating in numerous organizations and businesses, including rising to the presidency of the Star Bank of Anderson, Indiana, before easing back to the role of vice chairman of the board. He was devoted to his son Jimmy, who was born with Down syndrome. He lived at home and held a job nearby at the Hopewell Center for people with developmental difficulties.

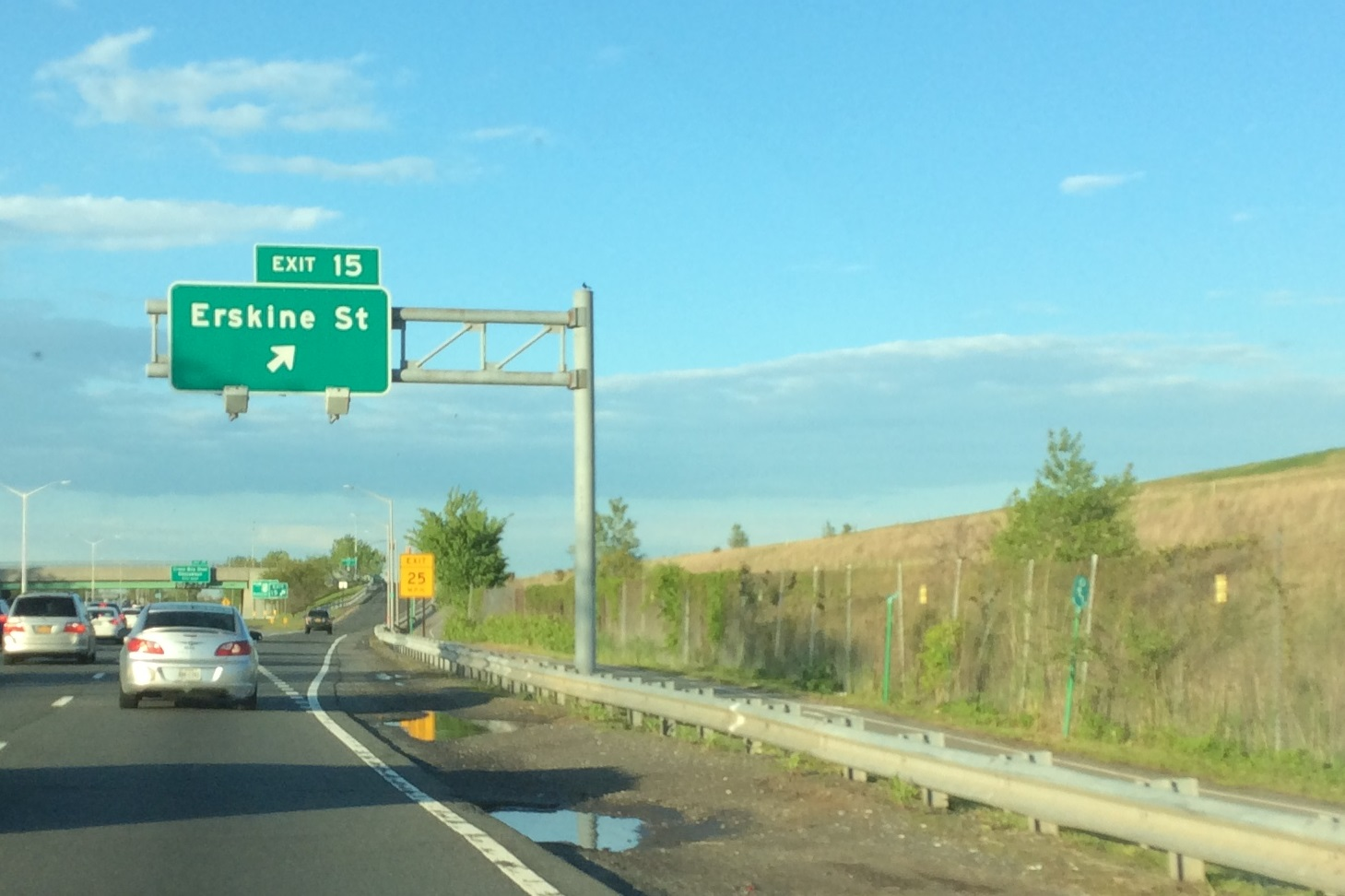
The Erskine Street exit of the Belt Parkway in Brooklyn

To commemorate Erskine's accomplishments both as a Dodger and as a citizen, a 6-foot (1.8 m) bronze statue was built in front of the Carl D. Erskine Rehabilitation and Sports Medicine Center. Erskine also donated part of his land to the Anderson Community School System to build a new school, which was named Erskine Elementary. In 2002, Erskine Street in Brooklyn was created and named after him.

In 2010, he was awarded the Sachem Award by Governor Mitch Daniels of Indiana, the state's highest honor which is given to recognize lifetime achievement of citizens of Indiana.

Erskine served as a member of the advisory board of the Baseball Assistance Team, a non-profit organization dedicated to helping former Major League, Minor League, and Negro league baseball players through financial and medical difficulties. Additionally, the Carl and Betty Erskine Society was formed by Erskine in order to raise money for the Special Olympics in which he was involved for more than 40 years.

In 2023, the National Baseball Hall of Fame and Museum awarded Erskine the Buck O'Neil Lifetime Achievement Award for his contributions to charity and his work towards the Special Olympics.

== Personal life and death ==
Erskine married Betty Palmer on October 5, 1947, they remained married for the next 76 years. The couple had four children together: Danny, Gary, Susan, and Jimmy. After his retirement, the couple lived in his hometown of Anderson, Indiana. He had initially planned to move his family to New York City to work as a representative for Van Heusen's athletic wear. However, after Jimmy Erskine was born with Down syndrome in 1960, the family chose to remain in Anderson.

Following a bout of pneumonia, Erskine died on April 16, 2024, at Community Hospital Anderson. He was 97. Erskine outlived his son, Jimmy, who had died in 2023.

Erskine was the last surviving member of the "Boys of Summer" Brooklyn Dodgers of the 1940s and 1950s, and the last surviving member of the 1955 World Champion Brooklyn Dodgers. Upon his death, Dodgers president and chief executive officer Stan Kasten released the following statement:

Carl Erskine was an exemplary Dodger. He was as much a hero off the field as he was on the field – which given the brilliance of his pitching is saying quite a lot. His support of the Special Olympics and related causes, inspired by his son Jimmy – who led a life beyond all expectations when he was born with Down Syndrome, cemented his legacy. We celebrate the life of 'Oisk' as we extend our sympathies to his wife, Betty, and their family.

Erskine's funeral was held in Madison Park Church of God in Anderson, Indiana on April 22. His body was later interred at Anderson Memorial Park.

== See also ==
- List of Major League Baseball no-hitters
- List of Major League Baseball players who spent their entire career with one franchise

Achievements
Preceded by Virgil Trucks; Sam Jones	No-hitter pitcher June 19, 1952; May 12, 1956	Succeeded by Virgil Trucks; Mel Parnell
Preceded by Don Newcombe; Preacher Roe	Brooklyn Dodgers Opening Day; Starting pitcher 1951; 1953–1955	Succeeded by Preacher Roe; Don Newcombe
