= Rudy Rufer =

American baseball player

- Shortstop
- Born: October 28, 1926; Ridgewood, New York, U.S.
- Died: October 25, 2010 (aged 83); Lynbrook, New York, U.S.
- Batted: Right Threw: Right

MLB debut
- September 22, 1949, for the New York Giants

Last MLB appearance
- October 1, 1950, for the New York Giants

MLB statistics
- Batting average: .077
- At bats: 26
- Hits: 2
- Stats at Baseball Reference

Teams
- New York Giants (1949–1950)

Rudolf Joseph Rufer (October 28, 1926 – October 25, 2010) was an American professional baseball player. He played in 26 games in Major League Baseball between the 1949 and 1950 seasons for the New York Giants, primarily as a shortstop.

Rufer spent two years of his four-year college baseball career playing at Dartmouth College and the other two at the University of Oklahoma. He also played for the minor league Wilmington Blue Rocks, for whom he still holds many team records.

Rufer resided in Malverne, New York, and was father to seven children. For twenty five years he was a scout for the Los Angeles Dodgers.
