= Joe Rossi (baseball) =

American baseball player (1921–1999)

- Catcher
- Born: March 13, 1921; Oakland, California, U.S.
- Died: February 20, 1999 (aged 77); Oakland, California, U.S.
- Batted: Right Threw: Right

MLB debut
- April 20, 1952, for the Cincinnati Reds

Last MLB appearance
- September 12, 1952, for the Cincinnati Reds

MLB statistics
- Batting average: .221
- Home runs: 1
- Runs batted in: 6
- Stats at Baseball Reference

Teams
- Cincinnati Reds (1952)

Joseph Anthony Rossi (March 13, 1921 – February 20, 1999) was an American professional baseball player. He played one season in Major League Baseball for the Cincinnati Reds in 1952, primarily as a catcher. Listed at 6 ft 1 in (1.85 m), 205 lb, Rossi batted and threw right-handed. He was born in Oakland, California.

In his lone major league season, Rossi served as backup to Reds' starting catcher Andy Seminick. He appeared in 55 games, hitting .221 (32-for-145) with one triple and one home run, driving in six runs and scoring 14 times while stealing a base.

Rossi also spent 14 years in the minor leagues between 1941 and 1956, also managing the Spokane Indians of the Northwest League in his last baseball season.

Rossi died in Oakland, California, at the age of 77.
