= Chris Van Cuyk =

American baseball player (1927-1992)

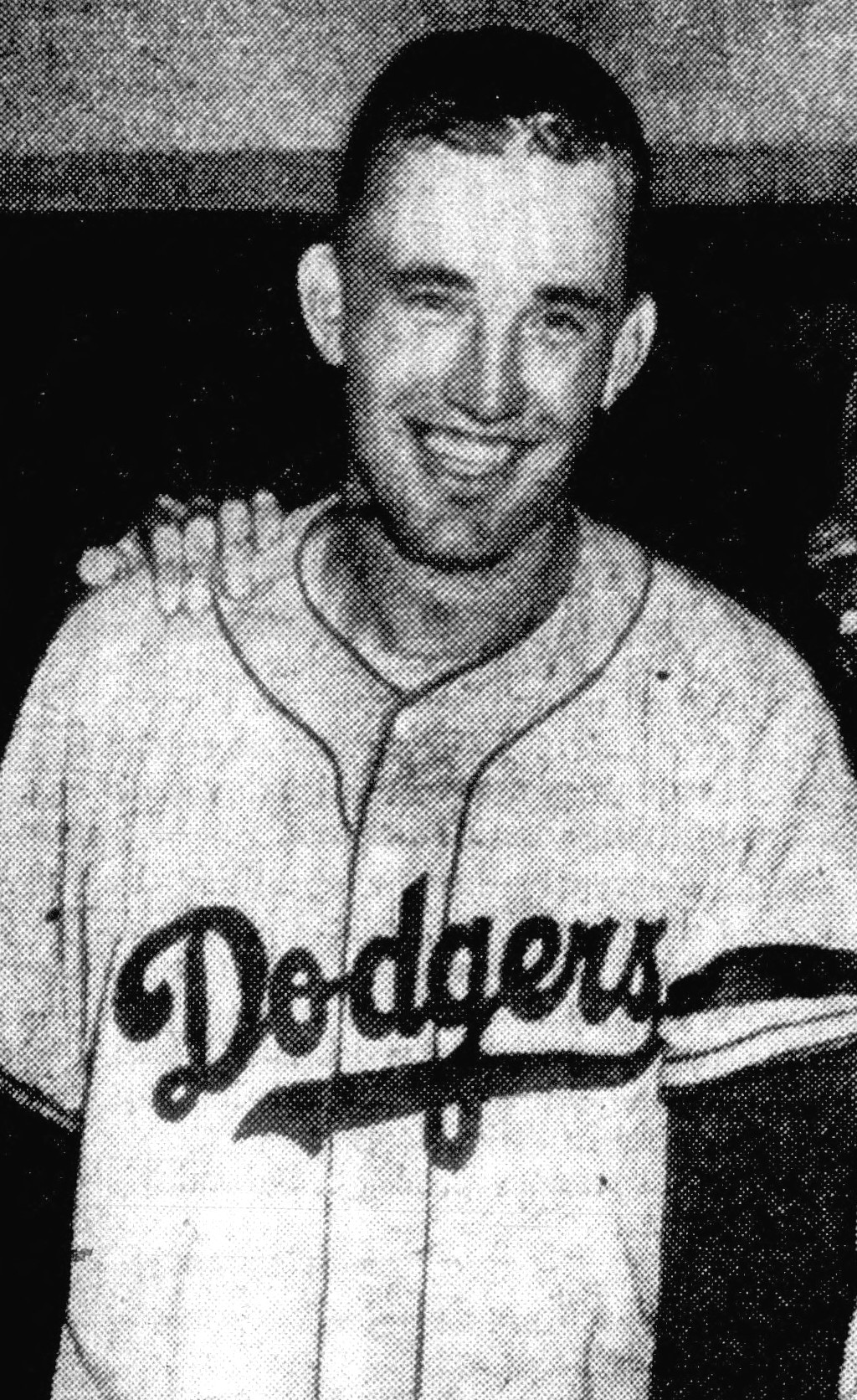
- Van Cuyk in 1950
- Pitcher
- Born: January 3, 1927; Kimberly, Wisconsin, U.S.
- Died: November 3, 1992 (aged 65); Hudson, Florida, U.S.
- Batted: Left Threw: Left

MLB debut
- July 16, 1950, for the Brooklyn Dodgers

Last MLB appearance
- August 15, 1952, for the Brooklyn Dodgers

MLB statistics
- Win–loss record: 7–11
- Earned run average: 5.16
- Strikeouts: 103
- Stats at Baseball Reference

Teams
- Brooklyn Dodgers (1950–1952)

Christian Gerald Van Cuyk (January 3, 1927 – November 3, 1992) was an American Major League Baseball left-handed pitcher. His older brother, Johnny Van Cuyk, also pitched in the majors.

Signed by the Brooklyn Dodgers as an amateur free agent in 1946, Van Cuyk made his Major League Baseball debut with the Brooklyn Dodgers on July 16, 1950, and appeared in his final game on August 15, 1952.

Before his entrance into professional baseball, Van Cuyk served in the US Navy during World War II.
