= Frank Smith (1950s pitcher) =

American baseball player (1928–2005)

- Pitcher
- Born: April 4, 1928; Pierrepont Manor, New York, U.S.
- Died: September 24, 2005 (aged 77); Malone, Florida, U.S.
- Batted: Right Threw: Right

MLB debut
- April 18, 1950, for the Cincinnati Reds

Last MLB appearance
- May 13, 1956, for the Cincinnati Redlegs

MLB statistics
- Win–loss record: 35–33
- Earned run average: 3.81
- Strikeouts: 277
- Stats at Baseball Reference

Teams
- Cincinnati Reds / Redlegs (1950–1954); St. Louis Cardinals (1955); Cincinnati Redlegs (1956)

Frank Thomas Smith (April 4, 1928 – September 24, 2005) was an American professional baseball player. Born in Pierrepont Manor, New York, he was a right-handed pitcher over parts of seven seasons (1950–56) with the Cincinnati Reds (also called the Redlegs in 1953–56) and the St. Louis Cardinals. During his career, he compiled a 35–33 record in 271 appearances, mostly as a relief pitcher, with a 3.81 earned run average, 277 strikeouts, and 44 saves.

Smith died at his Malone, Florida home on September 24, 2005.
