= Bud Podbielan =

American baseball player (1924–1982)

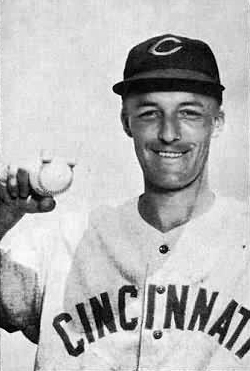
- Podbielan with the Reds in 1953
- Pitcher
- Born: March 6, 1924; Curlew, Washington, U.S.
- Died: October 26, 1982 (aged 58); Syracuse, New York, U.S.
- Batted: Right Threw: Right

MLB debut
- April 25, 1949, for the Brooklyn Dodgers

Last MLB appearance
- June 13, 1959, for the Cleveland Indians

MLB statistics
- Win–loss record: 25–42
- Earned run average: 4.49
- Strikeouts: 242
- Stats at Baseball Reference

Teams
- Brooklyn Dodgers (1949–1952); Cincinnati Reds / Redlegs (1952–1955, 1957); Cleveland Indians (1959)

Clarence Anthony Podbielan (March 6, 1924 – October 26, 1982) was an American professional baseball player, a pitcher for the Brooklyn Dodgers (1949–52), Cincinnati Reds/Redlegs (1952–55 and 1957) and Cleveland Indians (1959). He was born in Curlew, Washington.

On May 18, 1953 while pitching for the Cincinnati Reds, Podbielan walked a franchise record thirteen batters in a 10-inning game against the Brooklyn Dodgers.

In 9 seasons Podbielan had a 25–42 win–loss record, 172 games, 76 games started, 20 complete games, 2 shutouts, 35 games finished, 3 saves, 641 innings pitched, 693 hits allowed, 362 runs allowed, 320 earned runs allowed, 79 home runs allowed, 245 walks allowed, 242 strikeouts, 17 hit batsmen, 12 wild pitches, 2,792 batters faced and a 4.49 ERA.

Podbielan was a .154 hitter (29-for-188) in his nine-year major league career, and he had a career .980 fielding percentage with only three errors in 147 total chances covering 641 innings pitched over 172 games.

Bud Podbielan died in Syracuse, New York at the age of 58.
