= Dick Sisler =

American baseball player and coach (1920–1998)

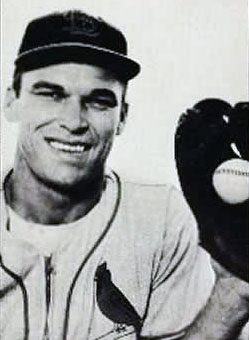
- First baseman / Left fielder / Manager
- Born: November 2, 1920; St. Louis, Missouri, U.S.
- Died: November 20, 1998 (aged 78); Nashville, Tennessee, U.S.
- Batted: Left Threw: Right

MLB debut
- April 16, 1946, for the St. Louis Cardinals

Last MLB appearance
- August 1, 1953, for the St. Louis Cardinals

MLB statistics
- Batting average: .276
- Home runs: 55
- Runs batted in: 360
- Managerial record: 121–94
- Winning %: .562
- Stats at Baseball Reference

Teams
- As player: St. Louis Cardinals (1946–1947); Philadelphia Phillies (1948–1951); Cincinnati Reds (1952); St. Louis Cardinals (1952–1953); As manager: Cincinnati Reds (1964–1965); As coach: Cincinnati Reds (1961–1964); St. Louis Cardinals (1966–1970); San Diego Padres (1975–1976); New York Mets (1979–1980)

Career highlights and awards
- All-Star (1950); 2× World Series champion (1946, 1967)

Richard Alan Sisler (November 2, 1920 – November 20, 1998) was an American player, coach, and manager in Major League Baseball. The son of Hall of Fame first baseman and two-time .400 hitter George Sisler, Dick Sisler's younger brother Dave was a relief pitcher in the 1950s and 1960s with four MLB teams, and his older brother George Jr. was a longtime executive in Minor League Baseball (MiLB).

== Early life ==
Sisler was born in St. Louis, Missouri. At John Burroughs School, a progressive private school his father helped found in 1923, he excelled in football, basketball, track, and baseball. Sisler enrolled at Colgate University, where he played baseball for one year before dropping out to sign a minor-league contract with the St. Louis Cardinals. He spent four years in the minor leagues, then, in 1943, enlisted in the United States Navy to help fight in World War II. Sisler rose to a chief petty officer and served as a physical instructor at the Bainbridge Naval Training Center in Maryland.

Upon his discharge in 1945, the Cardinals sent Sisler to Cuba to learn how to play first base. After a couple of weeks, the Cubans were proclaiming Sisler as their Babe Ruth. In his first game, Sisler recorded two home runs and in another game hit three more. He then made his MLB debut with the Redbirds in April 1946, spending a full season for the eventual National League and World Series champions.

== Playing career ==
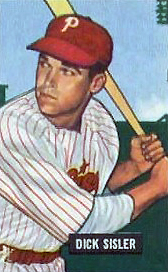
Sisler's 1951 Bowman baseball card

Listed at 6 feet 2 inches (1.88 m) tall and 205 pounds (93 kg), Sisler batted left-handed and threw right-handed.

Sisler was a journeyman left fielder and first baseman for the Cardinals (1946–47; 1952–53), Philadelphia Phillies (1948–51) and Cincinnati Reds (1952). He was traded along with Virgil Stallcup from the Reds to the Cardinals for Wally Westlake and Eddie Kazak on May 13, 1952. In an eight-season major-league career, he hit .276 with 720 hits, 55 home runs and 360 RBI in 799 games. Defensively, he recorded an overall .984 fielding percentage playing primarily at first base and left field.

Only with the Phillies did Sisler play on a consistent basis; he was Philadelphia's most-used first baseman in 1948 and 1949, and regular left fielder in 1950 and 1951. He made the National League All-Star team in 1950, a season during which Sisler reached personal bests in games played (141), games started (136, all in left field), at bats (523), runs scored (79), hits (155), doubles (29), homers (13), runs batted in (83), on-base percentage (.373), slugging percentage (.442) and batting average (.296). The season also gave Sisler lasting fame.

=== Pennant-winning home run ===
On the 1950 season's closing day, at Ebbets Field, with the game tied at one, Sisler hit a tenth-inning, opposite-field three-run home run against the Brooklyn Dodgers that led to the "Whiz Kids" Phillies winning the club's first National League pennant in 35 years. Had Philadelphia lost, the Phillies and Dodgers would have finished in a flatfooted tie for the NL championship and played a best-of-three playoff.

The home run (coupled with his slugging five years earlier in the Cuban winter league) made Sisler world-famous in baseball and literary circles when Ernest Hemingway immortalized him in his novel The Old Man and the Sea. In a conversation between an aging Cuban fisherman and his young apprentice discussing the unfolding 1950 big-league season, the older man says:

"In the other league, between Brooklyn and Philadelphia, I must take Brooklyn. But then I think of Dick Sisler and those great drives in the old park. There was nothing ever like them. He hits the longest ball I have ever seen."

His father, Hall of Fame player George Sr., had become a scout for Brooklyn after his own playing career ended, and served in that capacity when Dick Sisler hit his pennant-winning home run. When asked after the pennant-winning game how he felt when his son beat his current team, the Dodgers, George replied, "I felt awful and terrific at the same time."

In the 1950 World Series that followed, however, Sisler would collect only one single in 17 at bats (.059), as the Phillies were swept by the New York Yankees in four games. Earlier, in 1946, he had gone hitless in two at bats as a pinch hitter for the Cardinals in that season's Fall Classic, but picked up a World Series ring when the Redbirds defeated the Boston Red Sox in seven games.

== Coaching and managerial career ==
After managing in the minor leagues with the Double-A Nashville Vols and Triple-A Seattle Rainiers, Sisler became a coach for Cincinnati in 1961, serving under manager Fred Hutchinson.

In August 1964, he was promoted to acting manager when Hutchinson, suffering from terminal cancer, was forced to give up the reins. He led the Reds to a 32–21 record, and the team finished in a second-place tie (with the Phillies), one game behind the Cardinals. After his formal appointment as manager in October 1964, he brought the Reds home fourth in 1965 with an 89–73 mark before being fired at season's end. He then returned to the major league coaching ranks with the Cardinals (1966–70), San Diego Padres (1975–76) and New York Mets (1979–80). In 1967, while serving as the Cardinals' first base coach, Sisler earned his second World Series ring when St. Louis again defeated the Red Sox in seven games. In his late sixties, he was still working with young players as a roving hitting instructor in the Cardinal farm system.

Sisler died at a nursing home in Nashville, Tennessee on November 20, 1998 from an undisclosed illness at age 78.

== See also ==
- List of second-generation Major League Baseball players
- List of St. Louis Cardinals coaches

Preceded by Ernie White	Nashville Vols manager 1957–1959	Succeeded by Jim Turner
Preceded by Alan Strange	Seattle Rainiers manager 1960	Succeeded by Johnny Pesky
Preceded by Wally Moses	Cincinnati Reds first base coach 1961–1964	Succeeded by Reggie Otero
Preceded by Mickey Vernon	St. Louis Cardinals first base coach 1966–1970	Succeeded by Ken Boyer
