= Johnny Wyrostek =

American baseball player (1919–1986)

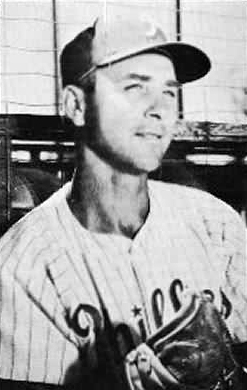
- Outfielder
- Born: July 12, 1919; Fairmont City, Illinois, U.S.
- Died: December 12, 1986 (aged 67); St. Louis, Missouri, U.S.
- Batted: Left Threw: Right

MLB debut
- September 10, 1942, for the Pittsburgh Pirates

Last MLB appearance
- September 26, 1954, for the Philadelphia Phillies

MLB statistics
- Batting average: .271
- Home runs: 58
- Runs batted in: 481
- Stats at Baseball Reference

Teams
- Pittsburgh Pirates (1942–1943); Philadelphia Phillies (1946–1947); Cincinnati Reds (1948–1952); Philadelphia Phillies (1952–1954)

Career highlights and awards
- 2× All-Star (1950, 1951)

John Barney Wyrostek (July 12, 1919 – December 12, 1986) was an American professional baseball player. He played all or part of eleven seasons in the Major League Baseball between 1942 and 1954 primarily as an outfielder, most often in right or center field. He batted left-handed, threw right-handed, and was listed as 6 feet 2 inches (1.88 m) tall and 180 pounds (82 kg).

Wyrostek was signed by the St. Louis Cardinals out of his East St. Louis high school. His contract was purchased by the Pittsburgh Pirates late in the 1941 season, and he played parts of the next two seasons with the Pirates as a reserve outfielder. On September 30, 1943, Wyrostek was traded back to the Cardinals. After a stint in the Army, his contract was sold to the Philadelphia Phillies in 1946, at which point he became an everyday player.

Wyrostek averaged eight homers a year in his career, and had only one season in which he hit over ten. In 1948, he had a total of 17 home runs with another career high, 76 RBIs, which he would tie later. His seven stolen bases on the year also tied a career-high.

In 1950, Wyrostek hit .285 with 8 homers and 76 RBIs with the Reds. On September 4 of that year, Wyrostek drove in eight of the Reds' 13 runs in a doubleheader sweep of the visiting Cardinals.

By 1951, Wyrostek was a good-hitting outfielder who averaged about a .266 batting average. But that year, his batting average skyrocketed to .311. While his power numbers went down (2 HR, 61 RBIs), his batting average was good for sixth in the league and his 167 hits was 10th. He made his second and final All-Star team.

In an 11-season career played with the Pirates, Phillies and Reds, Wyrostek batted .271 with 58 home runs and 481 RBIs in 1221 games. He had 525 runs scored with 33 stolen bases and a solid .349 on-base percentage. He had 1,149 hits with 209 doubles and 45 triples in his 4,240 at bats.
