= 1952 St. Louis Cardinals season =

Major League Baseball season

1952 St. Louis Cardinals
- League: National League
- Ballpark: Sportsman's Park
- City: St. Louis, Missouri
- Record: 88–66 (.571)
- League place: 3rd
- Owners: Fred Saigh
- General managers: William Walsingham Jr.
- Managers: Eddie Stanky
- Television: KSD
- Radio: WIL (Harry Caray, Gus Mancuso, Stretch Miller)
- Stats: ESPN.com; Baseball Reference

The 1952 St. Louis Cardinals season was the team's 71st season in St. Louis, Missouri and the 61st season in the National League. The Cardinals went 88–66 during the season and finished third in the National League.

Following his acquisition during the offseason, Eddie Stanky was named player-manager and eased himself out of the lineup over the course of the season.

== Offseason ==
- December 11, 1951: Chuck Diering and Max Lanier were traded by the Cardinals to the New York Giants for Eddie Stanky.
- Prior to 1952 season: Bob Smith was signed as an amateur free agent by the Cardinals.

== Regular season ==
=== Season standings ===
National League
Team	W	L	Pct.	GB	Home	Road
Brooklyn Dodgers	96	57	.627	—	45‍–‍33	51‍–‍24
New York Giants	92	62	.597	4½	50‍–‍27	42‍–‍35
St. Louis Cardinals	88	66	.571	8½	48‍–‍29	40‍–‍37
Philadelphia Phillies	87	67	.565	9½	47‍–‍29	40‍–‍38
Chicago Cubs	77	77	.500	19½	42‍–‍35	35‍–‍42
Cincinnati Reds	69	85	.448	27½	38‍–‍39	31‍–‍46
Boston Braves	64	89	.418	32	31‍–‍45	33‍–‍44
Pittsburgh Pirates	42	112	.273	54½	23‍–‍54	19‍–‍58

=== Record vs. opponents ===
1952 National League record Sources:
Team	BSN	BRO	CHC	CIN	NYG	PHI	PIT	STL
Boston	—	3–18–1	12–10	9–13	9–13	9–13	15–7–1	7–15
Brooklyn	18–3–1	—	13–9–1	17–5	8–14	10–12	19–3	11–11
Chicago	10–12	9–13–1	—	13–9	10–12	10–12	14–8	11–11
Cincinnati	13–9	5–17	9–13	—	6–16	10–12	16–6	10–12
New York	13–9	14–8	12–10	16–6	—	10–12	15–7	12–10
Philadelphia	13–9	12–10	12–10	12–10	12–10	—	16–6	10–12
Pittsburgh	7–15–1	3–19	8–14	6–16	7–15	6–16	—	5–17
St. Louis	15–7	11–11	11–11	12–10	10–12	12–10	17–5	—

=== Notable transactions ===
- May 13, 1952: Eddie Kazak and Wally Westlake were traded by the Cardinals to the Cincinnati Reds for Dick Sisler and Virgil Stallcup.
- August 30, 1952: Tommy Glaviano was selected off waivers from the Cardinals by the Philadelphia Phillies.

=== Roster ===
1952 St. Louis Cardinals
Roster
Pitchers: 25 Dick Bokelmann; 24 Cloyd Boyer; 27 Al Brazle; 31 Harry Brecheen; 28 Cliff Chambers; 22 Mike Clark; 32 Jackie Collum; 25 Jack Crimian; 42 Harvey Haddix; 41 Fred Hahn; 36 Stu Miller; 33 Vinegar Bend Mizell; 20 Red Munger; 21 Joe Presko; 44 Willard Schmidt; 14 Jerry Staley; 44 Bobby Tiefenauer; 20,22 Bill Werle; 43 Eddie Yuhas	Catchers: 17 Les Fusselman; 18 Del Rice; 16 Bill Sarni; Infielders: 25 Vern Benson; 5 Steve Bilko; 11 Tommy Glaviano; 7 Solly Hemus; 40 Neal Hertweck; 1 Billy Johnson; 3 Eddie Kazak; 36 Gene Mauch; 2 Red Schoendienst; 15 Dick Sisler; 3 Virgil Stallcup; 12 Eddie Stanky	Outfielders: 37 Peanuts Lowrey; 23 Larry Miggins; 6 Stan Musial; 39 Hal Rice; 9 Enos Slaughter; 17 Wally Westlake; Other batters: 38 Herb Gorman	Manager: 12 Eddie Stanky; Coaches: 8 Terry Moore; 29 Johnny Riddle; 35 Mike Ryba; 26 Buzzy Wares

== Player stats ==
= Indicates team leader

=== Batting ===
==== Starters by position ====
Note: Pos = Position; G = Games played; AB = At bats; H = Hits; Avg. = Batting average; HR = Home runs; RBI = Runs batted in

Pos	Player	G	AB	H	Avg.	HR	RBI
C	Del Rice	147	495	128	.259	11	65
1B	Dick Sisler	119	418	109	.261	13	60
2B	Red Schoendienst	152	620	188	.303	7	67
SS	Solly Hemus	151	570	153	.268	15	52
3B	Billy Johnson	94	282	71	.252	2	34
OF	Stan Musial	154	578	194	.336	21	91
OF	Peanuts Lowrey	132	374	107	.286	1	48
OF	Enos Slaughter	140	510	153	.300	11	101

==== Other batters ====
Note: G = Games played; AB = At bats; H = Hits; Avg. = Batting average; HR = Home runs; RBI = Runs batted in

Player	G	AB	H	Avg.	HR	RBI
Hal Rice	98	295	85	.288	7	45
Tommy Glaviano	80	162	39	.241	3	19
Larry Miggins	42	96	22	.229	2	10
Eddie Stanky	53	83	19	.229	0	7
Wally Westlake	21	74	16	.216	0	10
Steve Bilko	20	72	19	.264	1	6
Les Fusselman	32	63	10	.159	1	3
Vern Benson	20	47	9	.191	2	5
Virgil Stallcup	29	31	4	.129	0	1
Neal Hertweck	2	6	0	.000	0	0
Bill Sarni	3	5	1	.200	0	0
Gene Mauch	7	3	0	.000	0	0
Eddie Kazak	3	2	0	.000	0	0
Herb Gorman	1	1	0	.000	0	0

=== Pitching ===
= Indicates league leader

==== Starting pitchers ====
Note: G = Games pitched; IP = Innings pitched; W = Wins; L = Losses; ERA = Earned run average; SO = Strikeouts

Player	G	IP	W	L	ERA	SO
Gerry Staley	35	239.2	17	14	3.27	93
Vinegar Bend Mizell	30	190.0	10	8	3.65	146
Stu Miller	12	88.0	6	3	2.05	64
Harvey Haddix	7	42.0	2	2	2.79	31
Red Munger	1	4.1	0	1	12.46	1

==== Other pitchers ====
Note: G = Games pitched; IP = Innings pitched; W = Wins; L = Losses; ERA = Earned run average; SO = Strikeouts

Player	G	IP	W	L	ERA	SO
Joe Presko	28	146.2	7	10	4.05	63
Cloyd Boyer	23	110.1	6	6	4.24	44
Harry Breechen	25	100.1	7	5	3.32	54
Cliff Chambers	26	98.1	4	4	4.12	47
Willard Schmidt	18	34.2	2	3	5.19	30
Mike Clark	12	25.1	2	0	6.04	10

==== Relief pitchers ====
Note: G = Games pitched; W = Wins; L = Losses; SV = Saves; ERA = Earned run average; SO = Strikeouts

Player	G	W	L	SV	ERA	SO
Al Brazle	46	12	5	16	2.72	55
Eddie Yuhas	54	12	2	6	2.72	39
Bill Werle	19	1	2	1	4.85	23
Dick Bokelmann	11	0	1	0	9.24	5
Bob Tiefenauer	6	0	0	0	7.88	3
Jack Crimian	5	0	0	0	9.72	4
Jackie Collum	2	0	0	0	0.00	0
Fred Hahn	1	0	0	0	0.00	0
Stan Musial	1	0	0	0	----	0

== Awards and honors ==
- Eddie Stanky, Sporting News Manager of the Year

All-Star Game

- Stan Musial, Outfield, Starter
- Enos Slaughter, Outfield, Starter

== Farm system ==
Level	Team	League	Manager
AAA	Columbus Red Birds	American Association	Johnny Keane
AAA	Rochester Red Wings	International League	Harry Walker
AA	Houston Buffaloes	Texas League	Al Hollingsworth
A	Columbus Cardinals	Sally League	Sheldon "Chief" Bender
A	Omaha Cardinals	Western League	George Kissell
B	Winston-Salem Cardinals	Carolina League	Harold Olt and Jimmy Brown
B	Allentown Cardinals	Interstate League	Whitey Kurowski
B	Lynchburg Cardinals	Piedmont League	Jimmy Brown and Harold Olt
C	Fresno Cardinals	California League	Roland LeBlanc
D	Johnson City Cardinals	Appalachian League	Jim Hercinger
D	Goldsboro Jets	Coastal Plain League	Wes Livengood
D	Hazlehurst-Baxley Cardinals	Georgia State League	Arnie Riesgo
D	Albany Cardinals	Georgia–Florida League	Gene Corbett
D	Paducah Chiefs	KITTY League	Bob Stanton and Greg Masson
D	Hamilton Cardinals	PONY League	Harold Contini

LEAGUE CHAMPIONS: Rochester, Fresno, Albany
