= 1952 Chicago Cubs season =

1952 Chicago Cubs
- League: National League
- Ballpark: Wrigley Field
- City: Chicago
- Record: 77–77 (.500)
- League place: 5th
- Owners: Philip K. Wrigley
- General managers: Wid Matthews
- Managers: Phil Cavarretta
- Television: WGN-TV (Jack Brickhouse, Harry Creighton)
- Radio: WIND (Bert Wilson, Bud Campbell)

The 1952 Chicago Cubs season was the 81st season of the Chicago Cubs franchise, the 77th in the National League and the 37th at Wrigley Field. The Cubs finished fifth in the National League with a record of 77–77. Starting from this season, WGN was the exclusive television broadcast partner of the Cubs franchise with the transfer of WBKB ownership to CBS.

== Offseason ==
- October 4, 1951: Smoky Burgess and Bob Borkowski were traded by the Cubs to the Cincinnati Reds for Johnny Pramesa and Bob Usher.
- October 19, 1951: Grant Dunlap was purchased by the Cubs from the Shreveport Sports.
- Prior to 1952 season: Footer Johnson was signed as an amateur free agent by the Cubs.

== Regular season ==
=== Season standings ===
National League
Team	W	L	Pct.	GB	Home	Road
Brooklyn Dodgers	96	57	.627	—	45‍–‍33	51‍–‍24
New York Giants	92	62	.597	4½	50‍–‍27	42‍–‍35
St. Louis Cardinals	88	66	.571	8½	48‍–‍29	40‍–‍37
Philadelphia Phillies	87	67	.565	9½	47‍–‍29	40‍–‍38
Chicago Cubs	77	77	.500	19½	42‍–‍35	35‍–‍42
Cincinnati Reds	69	85	.448	27½	38‍–‍39	31‍–‍46
Boston Braves	64	89	.418	32	31‍–‍45	33‍–‍44
Pittsburgh Pirates	42	112	.273	54½	23‍–‍54	19‍–‍58

=== Record vs. opponents ===
1952 National League record Sources:
Team	BSN	BRO	CHC	CIN	NYG	PHI	PIT	STL
Boston	—	3–18–1	12–10	9–13	9–13	9–13	15–7–1	7–15
Brooklyn	18–3–1	—	13–9–1	17–5	8–14	10–12	19–3	11–11
Chicago	10–12	9–13–1	—	13–9	10–12	10–12	14–8	11–11
Cincinnati	13–9	5–17	9–13	—	6–16	10–12	16–6	10–12
New York	13–9	14–8	12–10	16–6	—	10–12	15–7	12–10
Philadelphia	13–9	12–10	12–10	12–10	12–10	—	16–6	10–12
Pittsburgh	7–15–1	3–19	8–14	6–16	7–15	6–16	—	5–17
St. Louis	15–7	11–11	11–11	12–10	10–12	12–10	17–5	—

=== Notable transactions ===
- May 8, 1952: Grant Dunlap was returned by the Cubs to the Shreveport Sports.

=== Roster ===
1952 Chicago Cubs
Roster
Pitchers: 26 Monk Dubiel; 30,37 Vern Fear; 18 Warren Hacker; 19,53 Joe Hatten; 53 Cal Howe; 33 Bob Kelly; 36 Johnny Klippstein; 20 Dutch Leonard; 35 Turk Lown; 19 Dick Manville; 24 Paul Minner; 30 Willie Ramsdell; 17 Bob Rush; 10,34 Bob Schultz	Catchers: 11 Toby Atwell; 32 Harry Chiti; 8 Bruce Edwards; 25 Johnny Pramesa; Infielders: 43 Leon Brinkopf; 12 Tommy Brown; 44 Phil Cavarretta; 40 Dee Fondy; 41 Bud Hardin; 2 Randy Jackson; 21 Eddie Miksis; 5 Bob Ramazzotti; 6 Bill Serena; 39 Roy Smalley Jr.	Outfielders: 16 Bob Addis; 7 Frank Baumholtz; 22 Gene Hermanski; 4 Hal Jeffcoat; 9 Hank Sauer; Other batters: 10 Ron Northey; 12 Bob Usher	Manager: 44 Phil Cavarretta; Coaches: 47 Spud Davis; 42 Roy Johnson; 49 Charlie Root

== Player stats ==
=== Batting ===
==== Starters by position ====
Note: Pos = Position; G = Games played; AB = At bats; H = Hits; Avg. = Batting average; HR = Home runs; RBI = Runs batted in

Pos	Player	G	AB	H	Avg.	HR	RBI
C	Toby Atwell	107	362	105	.290	2	31
1B	Dee Fondy	145	554	166	.300	10	67
2B	Eddie Miksis	93	383	89	.232	2	19
SS	Roy Smalley Jr.	87	261	58	.222	5	30
3B	Randy Jackson	116	379	88	.232	9	34
OF	Hal Jeffcoat	102	297	65	.219	4	30
OF	Frank Baumholtz	103	409	133	.325	4	35
OF	Hank Sauer	151	567	153	.270	37	121

==== Other batters ====
Note: G = Games played; AB = At bats; H = Hits; Avg. = Batting average; HR = Home runs; RBI = Runs batted in

Player	G	AB	H	Avg.	HR	RBI
Bill Serena	122	390	107	.274	15	61
Bob Addis	93	292	86	.295	1	20
Gene Hermanski	99	275	70	.255	4	34
Tommy Brown	61	200	64	.320	3	24
Bob Ramazzotti	50	183	52	.284	1	12
Harry Chiti	32	113	31	.274	5	13
Bruce Edwards	50	94	23	.245	1	12
Phil Cavarretta	41	63	15	.238	1	8
Johnny Pramesa	22	46	13	.283	1	5
Leon Brinkopf	9	22	4	.182	0	2
Bud Hardin	3	7	1	.143	0	0
Ron Northey	1	1	0	.000	0	0
Bob Usher	1	0	0	----	0	0

=== Pitching ===
==== Starting pitchers ====
Note: G = Games pitched; IP = Innings pitched; W = Wins; L = Losses; ERA = Earned run average; SO = Strikeouts

Player	G	IP	W	L	ERA	SO
Bob Rush	34	250.1	17	13	2.70	157
Johnny Klippstein	41	202.2	9	14	4.44	110
Warren Hacker	33	185.0	15	9	2.58	84
Paul Minner	28	180.2	14	9	3.74	61

==== Other pitchers ====
Note: G = Games pitched; IP = Innings pitched; W = Wins; L = Losses; ERA = Earned run average; SO = Strikeouts

Player	G	IP	W	L	ERA	SO
Turk Lown	33	156.2	4	11	4.37	73
Bob Kelly	31	125.1	4	9	3.59	50
Willie Ramsdell	19	67.0	2	3	2.42	30
Joe Hatten	13	50.1	4	4	6.08	15

==== Relief pitchers ====
Note: G = Games pitched; W = Wins; L = Losses; SV = Saves; ERA = Earned run average; SO = Strikeouts

Player	G	W	L	SV	ERA	SO
Dutch Leonard	45	2	2	11	2.16	37
Bob Schultz	29	6	3	0	4.01	31
Dick Manville	11	0	0	0	7.94	6
Vern Fear	4	0	0	0	7.88	4
Cal Howe	1	0	0	0	0.00	2
Monk Dubiel	1	0	0	0	0.00	1

== Farm system ==
Level	Team	League	Manager
Open	Los Angeles Angels	Pacific Coast League	Stan Hack
AAA	Springfield Cubs	International League	Bill Kelly
A	Macon Peaches	Sally League	Ed Hartness
A	Des Moines Bruins	Western League	Harry Strohm
B	Greensboro Patriots	Carolina League	Kemp Wicker
C	Visalia Cubs	California League	Larry Barton, Sr.
C	Sioux Falls Canaries	Northern League	Al Kubski
C	Topeka Owls	Western Association	Adolph Matulis and Jack Dean
D	Blackwell Broncos	Kansas–Oklahoma–Missouri League	Al Reitz
D	Hickory Rebels	Western Carolina League	Norm Small, Ed Yount and Charlie Bowles
D	Janesville Cubs	Wisconsin State League	Harry Bright

== Awards and honors ==
- Hank Sauer, National League Most Valuable Player
- Hank Sauer, National League Home Run Champion (with Ralph Kiner)
- Hank Sauer, National League RBI Champion
