= 1953 St. Louis Cardinals season =

Major League Baseball season

1953 St. Louis Cardinals
- League: National League
- Ballpark: Busch Stadium I
- City: St. Louis, Missouri
- Record: 83–71 (.539)
- League place: 3rd
- Owners: August "Gussie" Busch
- Managers: Eddie Stanky
- Radio: WIL (Harry Caray, Gus Mancuso, Stretch Miller)
- Stats: ESPN.com; Baseball Reference

The 1953 St. Louis Cardinals season was the team's 72nd season in St. Louis, Missouri and the 62nd season in the National League. The Cardinals went 83–71 during the season and finished in a tie for third place with the Philadelphia Phillies in the National League.

Prior to the start of the season, August A. Busch, Jr. of Anheuser-Busch bought the team from Fred Saigh. That started a reign that would last until March 1996, when William DeWitt, Jr., Drew Baur and Fred Hanser bought the club. Realizing the Cardinals now had more resources than he could possibly match, Bill Veeck, owner of the St. Louis Browns decided to search for another city to which to move the Browns. As a first step, he sold Sportsman's Park to the Cardinals. He would have probably had to sell the park in any case; the park had fallen into disrepair over the years, and the city had threatened to have it condemned. With the Browns' declining revenues – despite collecting rent from the Cardinals – Veeck could not afford to bring it up to code. Busch heavily renovated the 44-year-old park and renamed it Busch Stadium. Within a year, Veeck also sold the Browns to Jerold Hoffberger and Clarence Miles, and the new owners moved them to Baltimore as the Orioles.

== Offseason ==
- December 3, 1952: Grant Dunlap was purchased by the Cardinals from the Shreveport Sports.

== Regular season ==
=== Season standings ===
National League
| Team | W | L | Pct. | GB | Home | Road |
|---|---|---|---|---|---|---|
| Brooklyn Dodgers | 105 | 49 | .682 | — | 60‍–‍17 | 45‍–‍32 |
| Milwaukee Braves | 92 | 62 | .597 | 13 | 45‍–‍31 | 47‍–‍31 |
| Philadelphia Phillies | 83 | 71 | .539 | 22 | 48‍–‍29 | 35‍–‍42 |
| St. Louis Cardinals | 83 | 71 | .539 | 22 | 48‍–‍30 | 35‍–‍41 |
| New York Giants | 70 | 84 | .455 | 35 | 38‍–‍39 | 32‍–‍45 |
| Cincinnati Redlegs | 68 | 86 | .442 | 37 | 38‍–‍39 | 30‍–‍47 |
| Chicago Cubs | 65 | 89 | .422 | 40 | 43‍–‍34 | 22‍–‍55 |
| Pittsburgh Pirates | 50 | 104 | .325 | 55 | 26‍–‍51 | 24‍–‍53 |

=== Record vs. opponents ===
1953 National League record Sources:
| Team | BRO | CHC | CIN | MIL | NYG | PHI | PIT | STL |
|---|---|---|---|---|---|---|---|---|
| Brooklyn | — | 13–9–1 | 15–7 | 13–9 | 15–7 | 14–8 | 20–2 | 15–7 |
| Chicago | 9–13–1 | — | 12–10 | 8–14 | 9–13 | 5–17 | 11–11 | 11–11 |
| Cincinnati | 7–15 | 10–12 | — | 8–14 | 9–13 | 12–10 | 15–7 | 7–15–1 |
| Milwaukee | 9–13 | 14–8 | 14–8 | — | 14–8–1 | 13–9–1 | 15–7 | 13–9–1 |
| New York | 7–15 | 13–9 | 13–9 | 8–14–1 | — | 9–13 | 11–11 | 9–13 |
| Philadelphia | 8–14 | 17–5 | 10–12 | 9–13–1 | 13–9 | — | 15–7 | 11–11–1 |
| Pittsburgh | 2–20 | 11–11 | 7–15 | 7–15 | 11–11 | 7–15 | — | 5–17 |
| St. Louis | 7–15 | 11–11 | 15–7–1 | 9–13–1 | 13–9 | 11–11–1 | 17–5 | — |

=== Notable transactions ===
- May 18, 1953: Billy Johnson was released by the Cardinals.
- May 23, 1953: Jackie Collum was traded by the Cardinals to the Cincinnati Reds for Eddie Erautt.
- June 14, 1953: Hal Rice was traded by the Cardinals to the Pittsburgh Pirates for Pete Castiglione.

=== Roster ===
1953 St. Louis Cardinals
Roster
| Pitchers: 25 Dick Bokelmann; 27 Al Brazle; 28 Cliff Chambers; 22 Mike Clark; 32 Jackie Collum; 32,25 Eddie Erautt; 41 Jack Faszholz; 42 Harvey Haddix; 36 Stu Miller; 33 Vinegar Bend Mizell; 32,21 Joe Presko; 39 John Romonosky; 47 Willard Schmidt; 14 Gerry Staley; 26 Hal White; 43 Eddie Yuhas | Catchers: 38 Ferrell Anderson; 17 Les Fusselman; 16 Dick Rand; 18 Del Rice; 17 Sal Yvars; Infielders: 5 Steve Bilko; 1 Pete Castiglione; 7 Solly Hemus; 11 Ray Jablonski; 1 Billy Johnson; 15 Fred Marolewski; 2 Red Schoendienst; 19 Dick Schofield; 15 Dick Sisler; 12 Eddie Stanky | Outfielders: 10 Grant Dunlap; 10 Harry Elliott; 37 Peanuts Lowrey; 6 Stan Musial; 8 Rip Repulski; 9 Enos Slaughter; Other batters: 19 Vern Benson; 20 Eddie Phillips; 39 Hal Rice; 3 Virgil Stallcup | Manager: 12 Eddie Stanky; Coaches: 29 Johnny Riddle; 35 Mike Ryba; 30 Dixie Walker |

== Player stats ==
=== Batting ===
==== Starters by position ====
Note: Pos = Position; G = Games played; AB = At bats; H = Hits; Avg. = Batting average; HR = Home runs; RBI = Runs batted in

| Pos | Player | G | AB | H | Avg. | HR | RBI |
|---|---|---|---|---|---|---|---|
| C | Del Rice | 135 | 419 | 99 | .236 | 6 | 37 |
| 1B | Steve Bilko | 154 | 570 | 143 | .251 | 21 | 84 |
| 2B | Red Schoendienst | 146 | 564 | 193 | .342 | 15 | 79 |
| SS | Solly Hemus | 154 | 585 | 163 | .279 | 14 | 61 |
| 3B | Ray Jablonski | 157 | 604 | 162 | .268 | 21 | 112 |
| OF | Stan Musial | 157 | 593 | 200 | .337 | 30 | 113 |
| OF | Enos Slaughter | 143 | 492 | 143 | .291 | 6 | 89 |
| OF | Rip Repulski | 153 | 567 | 156 | .275 | 15 | 66 |

==== Other batters ====
Note: G = Games played; AB = At bats; H = Hits; Avg. = Batting average; HR = Home runs; RBI = Runs batted in

| Player | G | AB | H | Avg. | HR | RBI |
|---|---|---|---|---|---|---|
| Peanuts Lowrey | 104 | 182 | 49 | .269 | 5 | 27 |
| Harry Elliott | 24 | 59 | 15 | .254 | 1 | 6 |
| Sal Yvars | 30 | 57 | 14 | .246 | 1 | 6 |
| Pete Castiglione | 67 | 52 | 9 | .173 | 0 | 3 |
| Dick Sisler | 32 | 43 | 11 | .256 | 0 | 4 |
| Ducky Schofield | 33 | 39 | 7 | .179 | 2 | 4 |
| Ferrell Anderson | 18 | 35 | 10 | .286 | 0 | 1 |
| Dick Rand | 9 | 31 | 9 | .290 | 0 | 1 |
| Eddie Stanky | 17 | 30 | 8 | .267 | 0 | 1 |
| Grant Dunlap | 16 | 17 | 6 | .353 | 1 | 3 |
| Les Fusselman | 11 | 8 | 2 | .250 | 0 | 0 |
| Hal Rice | 8 | 8 | 2 | .250 | 0 | 0 |
| Billy Johnson | 11 | 5 | 1 | .200 | 0 | 1 |
| Vern Benson | 13 | 4 | 0 | .000 | 0 | 0 |
| Eddie Phillips | 9 | 0 | 0 | ---- | 0 | 0 |
| Fred Marolewski | 1 | 0 | 0 | ---- | 0 | 0 |

=== Pitching ===
==== Starting pitchers ====
Note: G = Games pitched; IP = Innings pitched; W = Wins; L = Losses; ERA = Earned run average; SO = Strikeouts

| Player | G | IP | W | L | ERA | SO |
|---|---|---|---|---|---|---|
| Harvey Haddix | 36 | 253.0 | 20 | 9 | 3.06 | 163 |
| Gerry Staley | 40 | 230.0 | 18 | 9 | 3.99 | 88 |
| Vinegar Bend Mizell | 33 | 224.1 | 13 | 11 | 3.49 | 173 |
| Joe Presko | 34 | 161.2 | 6 | 13 | 5.01 | 56 |
| John Romonosky | 2 | 7.2 | 0 | 0 | 4.70 | 3 |

==== Other pitchers ====
Note: G = Games pitched; IP = Innings pitched; W = Wins; L = Losses; ERA = Earned run average; SO = Strikeouts

| Player | G | IP | W | L | ERA | SO |
|---|---|---|---|---|---|---|
| Stu Miller | 40 | 137.2 | 7 | 8 | 5.56 | 79 |
| Cliff Chambers | 32 | 79.2 | 3 | 6 | 4.86 | 26 |
| Willard Schmidt | 6 | 17.2 | 0 | 2 | 9.17 | 11 |
| Jack Faszholz | 4 | 11.2 | 0 | 0 | 6.94 | 7 |

==== Relief pitchers ====
Note: G = Games pitched; W = Wins; L = Losses; SV = Saves; ERA = Earned run average; SO = Strikeouts

| Player | G | W | L | SV | ERA | SO |
|---|---|---|---|---|---|---|
| Al Brazle | 60 | 6 | 7 | 18 | 4.21 | 57 |
| Hal White | 49 | 6 | 5 | 7 | 2.99 | 32 |
| Mike Clark | 23 | 1 | 0 | 1 | 4.79 | 17 |
| Eddie Erautt | 20 | 3 | 1 | 0 | 6.31 | 15 |
| Jackie Collum | 7 | 0 | 0 | 0 | 6.35 | 5 |
| Dick Bokelmann | 3 | 0 | 0 | 0 | 6.00 | 0 |
| Eddie Yuhas | 2 | 0 | 0 | 0 | 18.00 | 0 |

== Farm system ==
| Level | Team | League | Manager |
|---|---|---|---|
| AAA | Columbus Red Birds | American Association | Johnny Keane |
| AAA | Rochester Red Wings | International League | Harry Walker |
| AA | Houston Buffaloes | Texas League | Al Hollingsworth and Dixie Walker |
| A | Columbus Cardinals | Sally League | Sheldon "Chief" Bender |
| A | Omaha Cardinals | Western League | George Kissell |
| B | Winston-Salem Cardinals | Carolina League | Jimmy Brown |
| B | Peoria Chiefs | Illinois–Indiana–Iowa League | Whitey Kurowski |
| B | Lynchburg Cardinals | Piedmont League | Dick Landis and John Sullivan |
| C | Fresno Cardinals | California League | Roland LeBlanc |
| C | St. Joseph Cardinals | Western Association | Harold Olt |
| D | Dothan Rebels | Alabama–Florida League | Homer Ray Wilson |
| D | Johnson City Cardinals | Appalachian League | Jim Hercinger |
| D | Sanford Cardinals | Florida State League | J. C. Dunn |
| D | Hazlehurst-Baxley Cardinals | Georgia State League | Arnie Riesgo |
| D | Albany Cardinals | Georgia–Florida League | Russ McGovern |
| D | Paducah Chiefs | KITTY League | Lee "Pete" Peterson |
| D | Hannibal Cardinals | Mississippi–Ohio Valley League | Tince Leonard |
| D | Hamilton Cardinals | PONY League | Harold Contini |
| D | Ardmore Cardinals | Sooner State League | Bennie Warren |

LEAGUE CHAMPIONS: Dothan, Hazlehurst-Baxley, Paducah
