= St. Joseph Cardinals =

Minor league baseball team (1939–1954)

- 1946–1953; (1939–1941, 1946–1951, 1953–1954); St. Joseph, Missouri

Minor league affiliations
- Class: Class C (1939–1941, 1946–1951, 1953–1954)
- League: Western Association (1939–1941, 1946–1951, 1953–1954)

Major league affiliations
- Team: Chicago Cubs (1939–1940); St. Louis Browns (1941); St. Louis Cardinals (1946–1951, 1953); New York Yankees (1954)

Minor league titles
- League titles (3): 1940; 1947; 1948
- Conference titles (3): 1948; 1949; 1953
- Wild card berths (3): 1940; 1947; 1954

Team data
- Name: St. Joseph Angels (1939); St. Joseph Saints (1940); St. Joseph Ponies (1941); St. Joseph Cardinals (1946–1951, 1953); Saint Joseph Saints (1954)
- Ballpark: Phil Welch Stadium (1939–1942, 1946–1949, 1951–1954)

The St. Joseph Cardinals were a minor league baseball team based in St. Joseph, Missouri. St. Joseph teams played as member of the Class C level Western Association between 1939 and 1954, winning league championships in 1940, 1947 and 1948.

The St. Joseph Cardinals were a minor league affiliate of the St. Louis Cardinals from 1946 to 1953 and adopted the "Cardinals" nickname in those affiliate seasons. In 1939 and 1940, St. Joseph was a Chicago Cubs affiliate, thenbecame a St. Louis Browns affiliate for the 1941 season. The team was a New York Yankees affiliate in its final season of 1954.

The St. Joseph Western Association league teams hosted home minor league games at Phil Welch Stadium, which was called City Stadium in the era. Opened in 1939 for the Cardinals' first season, the ballpark is still in use today.

Baseball Hall of Fame member Earl Weaver played for St. Joseph in 1949.

== History ==
=== Early St. Joseph teams ===
Minor league baseball began St. Joseph in 1886 when the St. Joseph Reds began play as members of the first incarnation of the Western League. The St. Joseph Saints began membership in the Western Association in the 1889 season.

Previous to the 1939 season, the city last hosted a minor league team in 1935, when the St. Joseph Saints ended a 29-year tenure of league play as members of the Western League. In 1936, the Class A level Western League reduced from an eight-team league to a six-team league, contracting the St. Joseph Saints and Keokuk Indians franchises from the league. St. Joseph was without a minor league team for the next three seasons. The Western League folded following the 1937 season and did not play in 1938.

=== 1939: St. Joseph joins Western Association ===
After not playing a 1938 season schedule, a new Western League reformed in 1939. The new Western League reorganized as a six-team, Class D level league. The league reformed in name only, as the Nebraska State League changed names. Transforming from the Nebraska State League, the new Western League did not include longtime member St. Joseph or any of the 1937 Western League member teams. St. Joseph instead resumed minor league play in a different league for the 1939 season.

St. Joseph regained a minor league franchise when the 1938 Western Association league champion Ponca City Angels of Ponca City, Oklahoma, moved to St. Joseph for the 1939 season. The Ponca City Angels were a minor league affiliate of the Chicago Cubs, beginning as an affiliate in 1935. With Ponca City, Goldie Holt had managed the Angels to an 84–54 record to win the pennant before sweeping the playoffs. Holt remained with the franchise after the relocation and became the St. Joseph player/manager.

The new St. Joseph franchise remained as a Cubs affiliate after the move from Ponca City. St. Joseph also kept the "Angels" nickname in beginning league play in the eight-team Class D level league. St. Joseph joined the Fort Smith Giants (New York Giants minor league affiliate), Hutchinson Pirates (Pittsburgh Pirates), Joplin Miners (New York Yankees), Muskogee Reds (Cincinnati Reds), Salina Millers, Springfield Cardinals (St. Louis Cardinals) and Topeka Owls (St. Louis Browns) teams in Western Association play. The Western Association began its season schedule with opening games held on April 27, 1939.

With a new league and a new nickname, the St. Joseph Angels began play in a new ballpark for their return to baseball during the 1939 season. St. Joseph hosted their home minor games at a newly constructed ballpark called City Stadium in the era, known today as Phil Welch Stadium. The ballpark opened in the 1939 Western Association season, built for estimated $100,000 as a Works Progress Administration project. The newly relocated St. Joseph Angels hosted their first home game at the newly built ballpark on June 23, 1939.

The St. Joseph Angels ended the regular season with a record of 66–72 and in fifth place in the final league standings. The Angels continued the Cubs' affiliation in St. Joseph. The Angels finished 19 games behind the first place Fort Smith Giants in the eight-team Class C league, playing the season under manager Goldie Holt. With their fifth-place finish in the regular season, the Angels did not qualify for the four-team playoffs. The 1939 Western Association playoffs were won by the Springfield Cardinals, who defeated Topeka in the finals.

Goldie Holt had the dual role of player/manager and played second base for St. Joseph at age 37. Holt batted .291 with 11 home runs while playing 127 games for the Angels. Overall, Holt played in 23 seasons in the minor leagues (1924–1942; 1944–1947) without reaching the major leagues as a player. In 1948, Holt became a coach in the major leagues with the Pittsburgh Pirates (1948–1950) and later coached with the Chicago Cubs (1961–1965). Holt had two separate terms serving as a scout for the Dodgers in both Brooklyn and Los Angeles, a position he held into the 1980's.

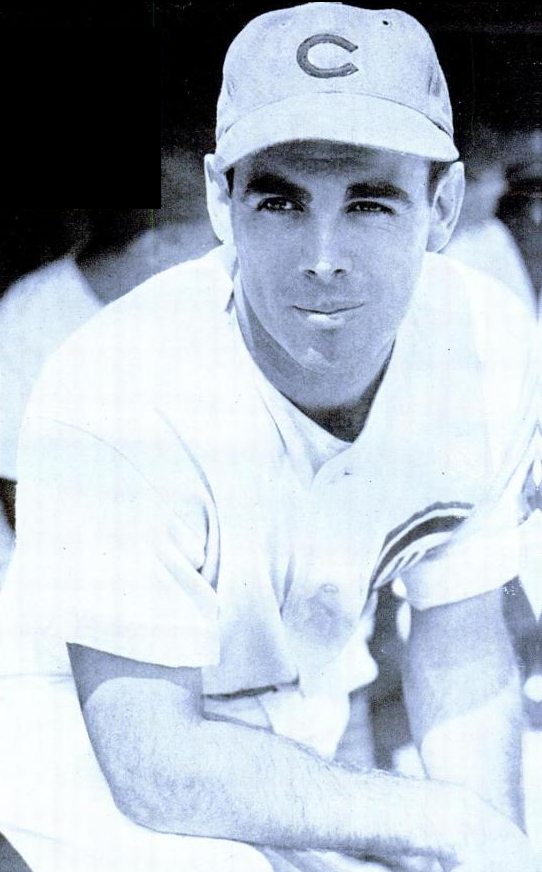
(1948) Peanuts Lowrey, Chicago Cubs. Lowery had a strong season for St. Joseph in 1939. He played in the major leagues for 13 seasons beginning in 1942. He was a coach in the major leagues through 1981.

Harry "Peanuts" Lowery played in the outfield for the Angels in 1939. Lowery had a strong season for St. Joseph at age 21, batting .344 with 15 home runs and 39 doubles in 137 games. Lowery came to St. Joseph after the Chicago Cubs signed him out of Hamilton High School in Los Angeles, California and assigned him to the Moline Plow Boys of the Three-I League for the 1937 season at age 18. Lowery reportedly gained his "Peanuts" nickname in Los Angeles when he was a childhood actor on the Our Gang comedy set. Actress Thelma Todd gained his good behavior on set by to buying him peanuts. Lowery played the 1938 season with the Ponca City Angels and remained with the Angles franchise in St. Joseph in 1939. Lowrey had a lengthy major league career with the Chicago Cubs (1942–1943, 1945–1949), Cincinnati Reds (1949–1950), St. Louis Cardinals (1950–1954) and Philadelphia Phillies (1955), making the 1946 All-star team.

In the winter of 1943–44, Lowrey was one of 12 major league leaguers placed under investigation by Baseball Commissioner Kenesaw Mountain Landis in the era of baseball segregation. The 12 players were under investigation for supposedly violating their major-league contract by appearing in off-season games playing alongside black players. Landis died in 1944, and the investigation was ended. Lowery entered the U.S. Army on April 15, 1944. He was honorably discharged after six months due to knee issues, missing the 1945 major league season.

In his major league career, Lowery batted .273 with 37 career home runs in 1,401 career games. Following his playing career, Lowrey served as a major league coach between 1960 and 1981. He was a notable coach for the Philadelphia Phillies (1960–1966), San Francisco Giants (1967–1968), Montreal Expos (1969), Chicago Cubs (1970–1971), California Angels (1972) and Chicago Cubs (1977–1981). As an actor, Lowery appeared in The Winning Team (1952) and Strategic Air Command (1955).

First baseman John Scolinos played for St. Joseph in 1939 at age 21. Following his tenure with St. Joseph, he served in the Army Air Force during World War II from 1942 to 1945 in the Pacific Theater. Following the war, Scolinos did not resume his minor league playing career. Scolinos remained in baseball and became a long-time collegiate baseball coach, coaching in five different decades and also coaching in the Olympics. From 1946 to 1960, Scolinos served as the Pepperdine Waves baseball coach at Pepperdine University. From 1962 to 1991, he was the head coach of the Cal Poly Pomona Broncos baseball team at Cal Poly Pomona University. His teams won he won three NCAA Division II national championships and he totaled 1,198 career collegiate victories. He was the pitching coach for the 1984 U.S. Olympic Baseball team. He is the namesake of Scolinos Field, the home ballpark of the Cal Poly Pomona baseball team. The ballpark was constructed in 1968 and re-named honoring Scolinos in 1980.

=== 1940 & 1941: Western Association title / franchise move ===
The team became known as the St. Joseph "Saints" for the 1940 season. St. Joseph qualified for the Western Association four-team playoffs and won the 1940 Western Association championship in the Class C level league. The St. Joseph Saints, continuing as a minor league affiliate of the Chicago Cubs, ended the Western Association regular season in fourth place. With a record of 69–63 under player/manager Keith Frazier, St. Joseph ended the regular season 17½ games behind the first place Muskogee Reds (90–49), who dominated in winning the league by 14 games over second place Topeka. With their fourth-place finish, the Saints secured the final spot and qualified for the four-team playoffs.

The Saints entered the Western Association playoffs and began by defeated the defending league champion Topeka Owls (St. Louis Browns affiliate). St. Joseph defeated Topeka in the first round of the playoffs 3 games to 1 to advance to the finals. The St. Joseph Saints then met the third place Fort Smith Giants in the championship series, after Fort Smith swept pennant winning Muskogee in three games in their series. St. Joseph dominated the finals as they swept the Giants 3 games to 0 to win their first Western Association title.

Frank Houska of St. Joseph won the Western Association batting title in 1940, hitting .379 on the season. Playing first base at age 27, Houska had 198 total hits on the 1940 season, with 30 doubles, 15 triples and 6 home runs. His minor league career ended following the 1941 season. St, Joseph player/manager Keith Frazier played in 116 games as an outfielder for the Saints and batted .343 with 6 home runs, 28 doubles and 13 triples in his dual role.

In 1941, the St. Joseph team became a minor league affiliate of the St. Louis Browns and St. Joseph became known as the "Ponies" for the 1941 Western Association season. The league continued play as a six-team Class C level league.

The "Ponies" nickname used by St. Joseph in 1941 ties to local history. The nationwide Pony Express began in St. Joseph on April 3, 1860. Today, the city is the home to the Pony Express National Museum. The museum is located at 914 Penn Street in St. Joseph.

Topeka, the former Browns affiliate remained in the league, but played the season as the only unaffiliated team in the eight-team league. The Muskogee Reds became the Chicago Cubs affiliate in the Western Association. The Ponies began league play in defense of their title in the Class C level Western Association. It was a tumultuous season for the franchise, which relocated during the season. On June 1, 1941, the St. Joseph Ponies had compiled a record of 10–22 to that point in the season, when the team moved south to Carthage, Missouri, and became the Carthage Browns. The team proceeded to finish in last place in the eight-team league, playing under managers Gus Albright and Dennis Burns. The team compiled a record of 30–74 while based in Carthage and ended the season in eighth place. St. Joseph/Carthage finished a distant 54 games behind the first place Joplin Miners in the final regular season standings. Joplin went on to sweep the four-team playoffs and capture the league title.

At age 26, Gus Albright played second base in his player/manager role with St. Joseph. He played in 45 games for the Cardinals and batted .276. To finish the season, Albright also playing in 51 games for the Paragould Browns after leaving the St. Joseph/Carthage team in 1941,. At age 43, player/manager Dennis Burns pitched in 7 games and had a record of 1–2 with a 9.41 ERA in 22 innings. It was his final season in professional baseball. Burns first joined the team in August 1941.

After the 1941 season, the Carthage Browns and the Salina Millers franchises both folded, as the Western Association reduced to a six–team league for the 1942 season. The 1942 Western Association played as a six-team league Class C level league without St. Joseph, Carthage or Salina as members.

The Western Association did not return to play in 1943, due to World War II, remaining dormant until 1946. In an era before the game became more international, professional baseball was greatly affected by the war as more than 2,000 minor league baseball players served in the United States armed forces during World War II. Over 500 major league players also served. There were 32 minor leagues that played in 1942. That number reduced to 10 in the 1943 season.

=== 1946: Western Association reforms ===
Following the completion of World War II, St. Joseph resumed membership in the Western Association for the 1946 season. The team had a new nickname and minor league affiliation. The Western Association reformed as an eight–team, Class C level league ending its three-season hiatus. St. Joseph resumed play as an affiliate of the St. Louis Cardinals, and adopted the "Cardinals" nickname in the process. The St. Joseph Cardinals joined with the Fort Smith Giants (New York Giants affiliate) Hutchinson Cubs (Chicago Cubs), Joplin Miners (New York Yankees), Leavenworth Braves (Boston Braves), Muskogee Reds (Cincinnati Reds), Salina Blue Jays (Philadelphia Phillies), and Topeka Owls teams in the reformed 1946 Western League. St. Joseph and the league members resumed play with opening day games scheduled for May 2, 1946. Tim Fairweather had been the Western Association's league president when the league took a hiatus during World War II in 1943. He returned as the league president when the league reformed on 1946.

Veteran second baseman Robert Stanton became the St. Joseph Cardinals' player/manager in 1946. At age 29, Stanton had last played in the 1941 season. Stanton had been in the St. Louis Cardinals minor league system since 1938 and the managerial position with St. Joseph was his first.

In returning to play in the 1946 season, the St. Joseph Cardinals finished in third place in the overall standings. The Western Association adopted a split-season schedule that advanced the two split season winning teams to the final. In the split season schedule the Fort Smith Giants won the first half pennant and the second half pennant winner were the Hutchinson Cubs. Hutchinson finished in second place and Fort Smith finished in fifth place in the overall league standings. In the overall standings, St. Joseph ended the regular season with an overall record of 75–62 to finish in third place. Playing the entire season under player/manager Robert Stanton, the Cardinals finished 3 games behind the first place Leavenworth Braves. Leavenworth also failed to qualify for the playoff final. Fort Smith lost in the Western Association finals to the champion Hutchinson Cubs.

Frank Celona of St. Joseph led the 1946 Western Association scoring 101 runs, while teammate Rocky Nelson had a noteworthy 23 triples on the season, tops in the Western Association. Playing shortstop in his first professional season, Celona had 108 hits and 104 bases on balls on the season. In his role as player/manager, Robert Stanton batted .237 with 2 home runs and 52 RBIs in 113 games for St. Joseph.

A left-handed hitting first baseman, Rocky Nelson batted .319 with 5 home runs 93 RBIs and 26 stolen bases for the Cardinals at age 21. He was given his "Rocky" nickname when teammate Whitey Kurowski bounced a ball off his head during a pepper game. After being struck by the ball, Nelson was uninjured and Kurowski proceeded to call him "Rocky." The nickname stuck with him for the rest of his life. Nelson went on to play nine seasons in the major leagues. He batted .300 in 1960 as the Pittsburgh Pirates won the 1960 World Series. Nelson batted .333 in the World Series with 1 home run and 2 RBIs. Nelson played in the major leagues with the St. Louis Cardinals (1949–1951), Pittsburgh Pirates (1951), Chicago White Sox (1951), Brooklyn Dodgers (1952), Cleveland Indians (1954), Brooklyn Dodgers (1956), St. Louis Cardinals (1956) and Pittsburgh Pirates (1959–1961), batting .249 with 31 career home runs. Nelson's 1946 season with St. Joseph was his first following his military service. He served from February 20, 1943, through 1945 with the U.S. Army in the Pacific Theater.

Born in St. Joseph, Robert Eisiminger pitched for his hometown team in 1946. Having begun his playing career in the St. Louis Cardinals minor league organization in 1939, Eisiminger played for St. Joseph at age 25 in 1946. He had a 14–7 record with a 2.66 ERA and 14 complete games in 30 appearances for the Cardinals. In 1949, Eisiminger worked as a teacher at Pickett High School in St. Joseph.

=== 1947 to 1949: Western Association / two championships ===
The 1947 St. Joseph Cardinals won the Western Association championship, playing their championship season under returning player/manager Robert Stanton. The Cardinals had a title winning playoff run after the Western Association adopted a four-team playoff system for the eight-team Class C level league. The St. Joseph claimed the a playoff spot after the Cardinals ended the 1947 Western Association regular season with a 72–67 final record, placing fourth in the final standings. St. Joseph finished 13½ games behind the first place Salina Blue Jays in the final regular season standings. In the four-team playoff for the eight-team league, the Cardinals secured the final playoff spot.

In the Western Association post season playoffs, the St. Joseph Cardinals began their championship run by defeating the Topeka Owls 3 games to 2 in the first round. In the finals, the Cardinals opponent was the Muskogee Reds, who had finished the regular season in third place with a 75–64 record. The Western Association championship series went 7-games as the St. Joseph Cardinals defeated the Muskogee Reds 4 games to 3 to win the Western Association championship.

Playing second base in 107 games, the Cardinals' player/manager Robert Stanton batted .290, had a .392 OBP with 0 home runs and 56 RBIs while managing St Joseph to the title. In their championship season, St. Joseph drew 88,000 home fans for the season, ranking second in the league to Topeka who drew 113,000.

Playing catcher for St. Joseph in 1947 Vern Rapp batted. 282 with 6 home runs and 87 RBIs in 101 games for the team. A native of St. Louis, Missouri, Rapp had signed with the St. Louis Cardinals organization in 1946, playing his first professional season with the Marion Cardinals. While Rapp never played in the major leagues, he later became the manager of the St. Louis Cardinals (1977–1978) and Cincinnati Reds (1984).

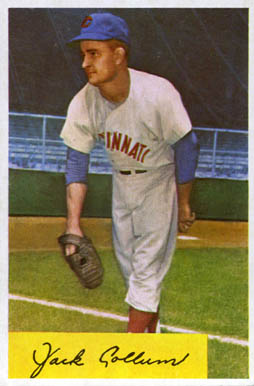
(1954) Jackie Collum, Cincinnati Reds, 1954 baseball card. Collum pitched for St. Joseph in 1947 and 1948. He was 24–2 in 1948.

Replacing Robert Stanton, Harold Olt became the player/manager of the St. Joseph Cardinals in 1948 and inherited the defending league champion team. At age 28, Olt was a manager for the first time and had begun play in the St. Louis Cardinals organization in 1939 with the Cambridge Cardinals.

Taking over leadership of the St. Joseph team, Harold Olt led St. Joseph to a second consecutive Western Association championship and a league pennant. The Western Association continued play as an eight-team Class C level league and the Cardinals ended the regular season in first place, capturing the league pennant. With a record of 90–48, St. Joseph ended the season 9 games ahead of the second place Fort Smith Giants and 43 games ahead of the eighth place Springfield Cubs.

In the 1948 Western Association four-team playoffs, the Cardinals won their first round series against Joplin, defeating the Joplin Miners 3 games to 2. In the finals, St. Joseph faced the Topeka Owls, who had just defeated the Fort Smith Giants 3 games to 1 in their first round series. In the finals, St. Joseph won their second consecutive championship, defeating Topeka 4 games to 2. With their second consecutive championship run, St. Joseph led the Western Association in home attendance, drawing 129,230 for the season. Joplin was second in the league with 95,722.

Future major league pitcher Jackie Collum had a dominant season for St. Joseph in 1948. Collum led the Western Association with both 24 wins and a 2.47 ERA for St. Joseph. At age 19, another future major league pitcher, Joe Presko had a 16–8 record, with a 2.70 ERA in 39 games with 17 complete games. Two 20-year-olds in the regular lineup also contributed greatly to the team's success. Outfielder Sid Langston batted .320 with 8 home runs and 110 RBIs for the Cardinals in 1948. Hit teammate, catcher Joe DiMartino hit .351 with 4 home runs and 111 RBIs, adding 31 doubles and 11 triples and a .912 OPS.

Player/manager Harold Olt played third base for St. Joseph and had an outstanding season. A left-handed hitter, Olt batted .343 with no home runs, but 110 RBIs and 134 runs scored. He had 108 bases on balls, 42 doubles and 15 triples. Olt moved to third base after committing 60 errors at shortstop the season prior for the Lynchburg Cardinals. Olt committed 33 errors playing third base for St. Joseph.

Left-handed pitcher Jackie Collum had a stellar 24–2 record for the 1948 St. Joseph Cardinals. Collum had served in World War II with the United States Army Air Forces in the Pacific Theatre of Operations prior to beginning his baseball career. The season prior, Collum had pitched to a 15–11 in 1947, playing his first professional season with St. Joseph after returning from war service. Collum pitched in the major leagues with the St. Louis Cardinals (1951–1953), Cincinnati Redlegs (1953–1955), St. Louis Cardinals (1956), Chicago Cubs (1957), Brooklyn Dodgers / Los Angeles Dodgers (1957–1958), Minnesota Twins (1962) and Cleveland Indians winning 32 career games in 171 career appearances.

Joe Presko pitched minor leagues for many years and had some time in the major leagues. He pitched in the major leagues for the, winning 25 career games in six seasons with the St. Louis Cardinals (1951–1954) and Detroit Tigers (1957–1958). Presco was signed by the St. Louis Cardinals after graduating from North Kansas City High School in 1946. After his playing career ended, Presko coached youth American Legion and Ban Johnson baseball teams in the Kansas City area for many years. One of his youth players was future Cy Young Award winner David Cone. David Cone attended a high school that did not have a baseball program. Cone credited Presco for developing him through play in the Ban Johnson leagues and giving him the confidence as a teenager that he could actually become a major league pitcher.

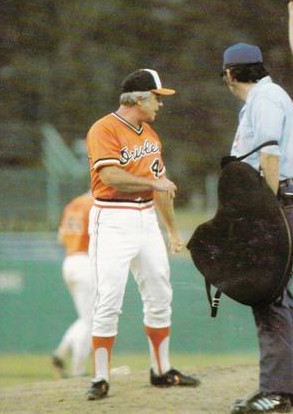
(1977) Baseball Hall of Fame member Earl Weaver, manager Baltimore Orioles. Weaver played for St. Joseph in 1948. he became a Hall of Fame manager for the Orioles.

After beginning his professional career with the 1948 West Frankfort Cardinals, Baseball Hall of Fame member Earl Weaver joined the St. Joseph Cardinals for the 1949 season. Weaver played second base for St. Joseph at age 18. He and batted .282, with 101 RBIs and an on-base percentage of .382, with 75 bases on balls, 80 runs scored and 17 stolen bases in 1949. After his season with West Frankfort, Weaver had become married. Prior to joining St, Joseph, Weaver worked at Liberty Loan in St. Louis, Missouri in the off season.

Weaver grew up in St, Louis. There his father owned and operated a dry-cleaning business located near Sportsman's Park that cleaned the uniforms for the St. Louis Browns and St. Louis Cardinals. Weaver was offered professional contracts by both the Browns and Cardinals out of high school. He chose to sign with the Cardinals. As a player, Weaver never reached the major leagues. He began managing in the minor leagues in 1956 and eventually became a coach with the Baltimore Orioles in 1967. Weaver became the manager of the Orioles in 1968. During his tenure, Weaver led Baltimore to four American League pennants and a victory in the 1970 World Series. Weaver managed Baltimore from (1968 to 1982 and 1985 through 1986, winning 1,480 career games. He was inducted into the baseball Hall of Fame in 1996.

With Weaver on the roster, the 1949 St. Joseph Cardinals sought to win their third consecutive Western Association championship. Harold Olt returned as the St. Joseph player/manager. The St. Joseph Cardinals continued as a St. Louis Cardinals affiliate and the 1949 team dominated the Western Association league regular season, while averaging 6.48 runs per game.

During the Western Association regular season, St. Joseph compiled a record of 96–42, to finish in first place, playing the full season under manager Harold Olt. The Cardinals ended the regular season 11 games ahead of the second place Fort Smith Giants (86–54) and an amazing 70½ games ahead of the last place Leavenworth Braves, who finished with a final record of 25–112. Notably, Leavenworth had started out the 1949 Western Association season with a 22-game losing streak before their first victory against the Hutchinson Elks on May 17, 1949. Hutchinson ended their 1949 season in seventh place with a 41–93 record, 54 games behind St. Joseph.

In the four-team playoffs, St, Joseph matched up against the Topeka Owls, who had finished fourth in the regular season standings, ending the season 19 games behind the Cardinals. Topeka pulled the upset win over The Cardinals, taking the series 3 games to 2, ending the St. Joseph Western Association title run. The Topeka Owls lost 4 games to 2 to the new champion Joplin Miners in the finals. St. Joseph again led the Western Association in attendance during their 1949 pennant winning season, drawing 126,301, finishing ahead of Topeka's 116,136.

With Earl Weaver at second base, St. Joseph player/manager Harold Olt played 117 games at third base in 1949. Olt batted .317 with 5 home runs and 87 RBIs on the season. He cut his errors in the field to 17. John Pruett played shortstop for St. Joseph in 1949, having served as a player/manager of the Lawrenceville Cardinals the previous season. Playing in 132 games, Pruett compiled more bases on balls (101) than total hits (88) for St. Joseph while batting .212, with a .369 OBP. At age 24, 1949 was his final professional season.

St. Joseph pitcher Nick Huck led the Western Association with a 2.25 ERA on the 1949 season. Huck had an 18–7 record with 19 complete games and 7 shutouts for the season. Huck pitched again for St. Joseph in 1950 and won 5 games in the final season of his career at age 25. He returned to the team for the 1951 season, but was cut on April 8, 1951, and never played again. Huck had served in the U.S. Army during World War II from April 5, 1943, to November 12, 1945 prior to his time with St. Joseph.

=== Western Association 1950–1951 ===
With Olt returning for a third season as their player/manager, the St. Joseph Cardinals continued Western Association play in 1950. St. Joseph did not make the four-team league playoffs in 1950. The Cardinals ended the season with a record of 67–69 to finish in fifth place, ending their string of solid seasons in the league by missing the league playoffs. Remaining a St. Louis Cardinals affiliate, St. Joseph finished 23 games behind the first place Joplin Miners (New York Yankees affiliate) in the eight-team Class C level league. Player/manager Harold Olt played third base in 132 games, batting .305 with 32 doubles, 8 triples and 5 home runs on the season.

The Joplin Miners, managed by Harry Craft, with the legendary Mickey Mantle on the team as an 18-year-old shortstop, won the league pennant following the regular season. In the post season, St. Joseph didn't qualify for the four-team playoffs as the Hutchinson Elks won Western Association championship in 1950. At age 18, Mantle led the Western Association with a league-leading .383 batting average with 26 home runs and 136 RBIs.

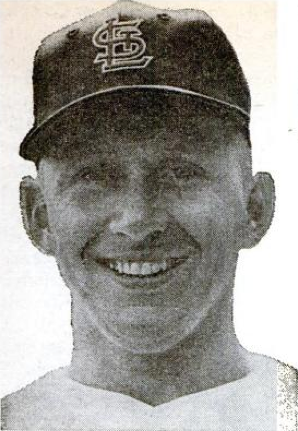
(1960) Joe Cunningham, St. Louis Cardinals. Cunningham played for St. Joseph in 1950

Left-handed hitter Joe Cunningham played first base for the St. Joseph Cardinals in 1950 at 18 years of age. After graduating from Lodi High School (New Jersey) in 1949, Cunningham was signed by Benny Borgmann, a scout for the St. Louis Cardinals to a contract paying him $150 per month. Notably, a former basketball player, Borgmann as inducted into the Naismith Memorial Basketball Hall of Fame in 1961.

After being signed by Borgmann, Cunningham was assigned by the St. Louis Cardinals to the Johnson City Cardinals, where played 60 games for Johnson City in 1949 and batted .345 at age 17. Playing in his second professional season, Johnson played in 136 games for St. Joseph, batting .286 with 10 home runs, 26 doubles and 14 triples on the season. Cunningham became a two-time major-league All-Star in his career with the St. Louis Cardinals (1954, 1956–1961), Chicago White Sox (1962–1964) and Washington Senators (1964–1966). Cunningham batted .291 and had a .403 OBP, 820 OPS in his 12 career major league seasons with 64 home runs in 1,121 career games. He had 599 career bases on balls against 369 strikeouts.

Following the conclusion of his playing career, beginning in 1968, Joe Cunningham worked for the St. Louis organization in various capacities through the late 1990's. In recognition of his tenure with for the franchise, the St. Louis Cardinals dedicated a section of Busch Stadium as "Cunningham Corner" in 2015.

St. Joseph had a new manager in 1951. Gene Corbett and Olt both switched teams while remaining within the St. Louis Cardinals minor league organization. Corbett became the St. Joseph Cardinals' new player/manager. Olt's three season tenure with St. Joseph ended, as the major league Cardinals organization named him manager of the Winston-Salem Cardinals of the Class B level Carolina League. Olt's three season tenure with St. Joseph ended, as the major league Cardinals organization named him manager of the Winston-Salem Cardinals of the Class B level Carolina League. Gene Corbett joined St. Joseph having just served as the player/manager of the Allentown Cardinals in the Class B level Interstate League the prior season. Corbett was 37 years old in 1951 and had been in the Cardinals origination as a player/manager beginning in 1947. He had managed the 1947 Decatur Commodores, before managing the Salisbury Cardinals in 1948 and 1949. As a major league player, Corbett had played first base for the Philadelphia Phillies in brief appearances from 1936 to 1938, appearing in 37 total major league games and batting .120 with 2 home runs.

On August 5, 1951, St. Joseph completed a three-game sweep of the Joplin Miners at home, winning the game by the score of 4–3 as Bubber Joyner pitched a complete game for the Cardinals. After the game, St. Joseph was in fourth place in the Western Association standings with a 45–40 record. Joplin and Topeka were tied for first place. St. Joseph was scheduled to play Enid in their next game at City Stadium.

The St. Joseph team continued membership in the Western Association, as a minor league affiliate of the St. Louis Cardinals. The Western Association had flooding in the region that affected the 1951 post season. The Cardinals finished third in the Western Association regular season standings. With a record of 69–51, St. Joseph finished 6 games behind the first place Topeka Owls in the final standings. St. Joseph would have qualified for a four-team playoff, but a natural disaster ended the Western Association season before a post season could be played.

The Western Association post season schedule was cancelled due to flooding in the region. The Great Flood of 1951 killed 17 people and left 518,000 without shelter. With the flooding in the region, St. Joseph had home attendance of 47,133 for the 1951 season, sixth best in the eight-team Western Association.

St. Joseph outfielder Gene Barth led the Western Association with 103 RBIs on the 1951 season. St. Joseph pitcher Walter Montgomery led the league with 230 strikeouts.

After batting .311 for St. Joseph in 1951, Gene Barth left professional baseball after the 1952 season and became successful in business while also embarking on a long tenure as a professional football official. He became the president of the Bonafide Oil Company, of Hazelwood, Missouri. Barth was a long time official in the National Football League, from 1971 to 1991. Barth was the Referee for Super Bowl XVIII, held on January 22, 1984.

A native of Hannibal, Missouri, Eddie Phillips played for St. Joseph in 1951, batting .307, with a team leading 13 home runs with 13. and 14 triples with a .519 slugging percentage. St. Louis Cardinals scout, Ollie Vaneck, who had signed Cardinals Stan Musial in 1938, signed Eddie to a professional contract as an outfielder on August 28, 1949, after his graduation from Hannibal High School. After receiving a $2,000 signing bonus, Phillips was assigned to the West Frankfort Cardinals in 1950, before joining St. Joseph. During the 1951 season, Phillips was fined $5.00 by the league for his argument with an umpire on May 11, 1951. Phillips played briefly with the 1953 St. Louis Cardinals, where he was utilized as a pinch runner, making 9 appearances.

=== 1953: Franchise rejoins Western Association ===
After flooding hit the region in 1951, the St. Joseph franchise did not return to membership in the league as the 1952 Western Association continued play as a Class C level league but with fewer teams. The Western Association reduced to six teams from eight teams dropping St. Joseph and the Enid Buffaloes from membership. The Joplin Miners won the league pennant in 1952. The 1952 Western Association league playoff final was won by the Joplin over Muskogee.

The 1953 Western Association remained a six-team, Class D level league and the St. Joseph Cardinals franchise returned to Western Association play after a one season hiatus. Former major league umpire George Barr became the Western Association league president. As the league remained a Class C level league, the St. Joseph Cardinals replaced the Salina Blue Jays in the league. Salina had been a Philadelphia Phillies affiliate, and the 1952 league did not have a St. Louis Cardinals affiliate member. In rejoining the league, St. Joseph also resumed its partnership as a St. Lousi Cardinals minor league affiliate n 1953. While replacing Salina, St. Joseph joined the five returning teams in Western Association league play. The Fort Smith Twins, Hutchinson Elks (Pittsburgh Pirates affiliate), Joplin Miners (New York Yankees), Muskogee Reds (New York Giants) and Topeka Owls (Chicago White Sox) teams continued their Western Association membership in the 1953 season .

Harold Olt returned to St. Joseph in the role of player/manager and led the Cardinals team to the 1953 Western Association pennant. St. Joseph ended the 1953 season with a third pennant in the Western Association standings. St. Joseph ended the season with a record of 83–57, finishing in first place in the six-team league. The Cardinals finished 3 games ahead of the second place Hutchinson Elks and 33½ games ahead of the last place Van Buren Twins in the standings.

In the four-team Western Association playoffs, the Cardinals swept the fourth place Joplin Miners 3 games to 0 in the semi-finals. St. Joseph then faced the Hutchinson Elks, who had swept the Topeka Owls to advance. In the finals Hutchinson, a Pittsburgh Pirates minor league affiliate beat St. Joseph 4 games to 1 to win the 1953 Western Association title.

Returning to St. Joseph at age 33, Harold Olt had been the player-manager of the Winston-Salem Cardinals and Lynchburg Cardinals the prior two seasons. Playing third base for St. Joseph, Olt batted .267 with 1 home run and a .425 OBP in 105 games

=== 1954: Final season / Yankees affiliate ===
The St. Joseph team became a New York Yankees affiliate in 1954, as the Western Association expanded to an eight-team league. Raterher than the "Yankees'" St. Joseph was known again by "Saints" nickname as the team played their final season in 1954. The Blackwell Broncos, Iola Indians, and Ponca City Jets teams were the new league franchises. The St. Louis Cardinals affiliate moved to former Yankee affiliate Joplin, as the teams basically traded affiliates. St. Joseph played as the "Saints" and Joplin became the Joplin Cardinals. The Van Buren Twins didn't return to the league.

William "Bill" Cope became the St. Joseph player/manager for the 1954 season. At age 30, Cope had been a minor league player in the Yankees minor league system since 1948. He joined St. Joseph after serving the prior two seasons as the player/manager for the McAlester Rockets in the Sooner State League, leading the Rockets to the 1952 league championship. Cope had attended Ohio State University where he played on both the Ohio State Buckeyes baseball and basketball teams. Cope also played professional basketball in the 1948 season as a member of his hometown Zanesville Pioneers of the All-American Professional Basketball League. Cope had served in the U.S. Navy during World War II.

As a New York Yankees affiliate, St. Joseph had a successful 1954 season, as the Saints advanced to the Western Association finals for the second consecutive season. The Saints ended their 1954 season with a record of 82–57 to finish in third place. Playing the season under player/manager Bill Cope, St. Joseph finished 5½ games behind the first place Topeka Owls and qualified for the four-team playoffs.

In the first round of the four-team playoffs, St. Joseph defeated the Muskogee Giants 3 games to 2 and advanced. The Saints met the Blackwell Broncos, who had defeated 4 games to 0. St. Joseph lost in the Western Association final, as Blackwell won the series 4 games to 1. They were the final Western Association games ever played in the league. St. Joseph drew 58,647 for the season, third most in the final season for the league.

Serving as a utility player manning five different positions, player/manager Bill Cope played in 75 games for St. Joseph. Cope batted .232 with 1 home run and 35 RBIs for the Saints. A native of Zanesville, Ohio, 1954 was Cope's final season in professional baseball.

Playing shortstop for St. Joseph, Fritz Brickell had a strong season for the Saints, being named to the Western Association All-star team. Brickell batted .306 with 11 home runs and 97 RBIs playing at age 19. He committed 56 errors in 119 games at shortstop. Brickell played briefly in the major leagues for the New York Yankees (1958–1959) and Los Angeles Angels (1961), batting .182 with 1 home run and 7 RBIs in 42 career games. Brickell was a native of Wichita, Kansas and on August 29, 1965, "Fritz Brickell Night" was held at Lawrence Stadium in Wichita. Brickell was stricken with cancer and the event was organized to raise funds for Brickell's medical expenses. His former New York Yankee teammate Mickey Mantle flew in for the event and put on a hitting exhibition for the fans in attendance. Brickell died on October 15, 1965. He was 30 years old, survived by his wife and two children.

The Western Association permanently folded following the 1954 season. After the season, the Muskogee Giants became members of the 1955 Sooner State League and the other seven Western Association member franchises folded.

St. Joseph has not hosted another minor league team. The amateur St. Joseph Mustangs, a collegiate summer baseball team began play as members of the M.I.N.K. Collegiate Baseball League in 2009.

== The ballpark ==
The St. Joseph teams hosted home minor league home games at Phil Welch Stadium, which is still in use today. The ballpark was called City Stadium in the era. The ballpark was named for former St. Joseph mayor and congressman Phil J. Welch in 1964.

The ballpark originally opened for the 1939 season as the home of the St. Joseph Western Association minor league franchise. The ballpark was constructed in 1939 as a Works Progress Administration Project for an estimated cost of over $100,000. The stadium was built in a timeline of 10 weeks with the project overseen by Lehr Construction. The St. Joseph Angels played their first game in the newly constructed ballpark on June 23, 1939. The ballpark grandstand was built with steel, cement and a brick backstop.

In the era, the ballpark also hosted games featuring touring Negro Leagues teams. The ballpark often hosted the Kansas City Monarchs and other Negro League teams during the 1940s and 1950s. Negro League players such as Satchel Paige, Buck O'Neil and Willie Mays played games at the ballpark.

In 2009, the St. Joseph Mustangs of the collegiate summer baseball format M.I.N.K. Collegiate Baseball League began play, hosting home games at Phil Welch Stadium.

Still in use today as a baseball stadium, Phil Welch Stadium is located at 2600 SW Parkway in St. Joseph.

== Timeline ==
Year(s)	# Yrs.	Team	Level	League	Affiliate	Ballpark
1939	1	St. Joseph Angels	Class C	Western Association	Chicago Cubs	Phil Welch Stadium
1940	1	St. Joseph Saints	Class C	Western Association	Chicago Cubs	Phil Welch Stadium
1941	1	St. Joseph Ponies	Class C	Western Association	St. Louis Browns	Phil Welch Stadium
1946–1951	6	St. Joseph Cardinals	Class C	Western Association	St. Louis Cardinals	Phil Welch Stadium
1953	1	St. Joseph Cardinals	Class C	Western Association	St. Louis Cardinals	Phil Welch Stadium
1954	1	St. Joseph Saints	Class C	Western Association	New York Yankees	Phil Welch Stadium

== Year–by–year records ==
Year	Record	Finish	Manager	Playoffs/Notes
1939	66–72	5th	Goldie Holt	Did not qualify
1940	69–63	4th	Keith Frazier	League champions
1941	40–96	8th	Gus Albright / Dennis Burns	Team (10–22) moved to Carthage June 3
1946	75–62	3rd	Robert Stanton	Did not qualify
1947	72–67	4th	Robert Stanton	League champions
1948	90–48	1st	Harold Olt	Won pennant League champions
1949	96–42	1st	Harold Olt	Won pennant Lost in 1st round
1950	67–69	5th	Harold Olt	Did not qualify
1951	69–51	3rd	Gene Corbett	No playoffs held due to flooding
1952	Did not play			
1953	83–57	1st	Harold Olt	Won pennant Lost League Finals
1954	82–57	3rd	William Cope	Lost League Finals

== Notable alumni ==
- Earl Weaver (1949) Inducted Baseball Hall of Fame, 1996
- Gene Barth (1950)
- Jim Bilbrey (1941)
- Fritz Brickell (1954)
- Dennis Burns (1941, MGR)
- Jackie Collum (1948)
- Gene Corbett (1951, MGR)
- Joe Cunningham (1950) 2x MLB All-Star
- Bob Duliba (1953)
- Paul Erickson (1939)
- Keith Frazier (1940, MGR)
- Don Gilmore (1945)
- Chris Haughey (1947)
- Goldie Holt (1939, MGR)
- Fred Koenig (1953)
- Dan Lewandowski (1950)
- Peanuts Lowrey (1939) MLB All-Star
- Frank Mancuso (1940-1941)
- Fred Marolewski (1949)
- Rocky Nelson (1946)
- Roy Partee (1939)
- Eddie Phillips (1951)
- Joe Presko (1945)
- Vern Rapp (1947)
- John Scolinos (1939)
- Bill Smith (1953)
- Bobby Smith (1953)
- Roy Wright (1953)

== See also ==
- St. Joseph Cardinals players
- St. Joseph Angels players
- St. Joseph Ponies players
