= Keith Frazier =

Keith Frazier may refer to:

- Keith Frazier (baseball)
- Keith Frazier (musician)
