= Bud Hardin =

American baseball player (1922–1997)

- Second baseman / Shortstop
- Born: June 14, 1922; Shelby, North Carolina, U.S.
- Died: July 28, 1997 (aged 75); Rancho Santa Fe, California, U.S.
- Batted: Right Threw: Right

MLB debut
- April 15, 1952, for the Chicago Cubs

Last MLB appearance
- May 1, 1952, for the Chicago Cubs

MLB statistics
- Batting average: .143
- Home runs: 0
- Runs batted in: 0
- Stats at Baseball Reference

Teams
- Chicago Cubs (1952)

William Edgar "Bud" Hardin (June 14, 1922 – July 28, 1997) was an American professional baseball player. Although he played professionally for 13 seasons (1942; 1946–1957), Hardin appeared in only three Major League games as a shortstop, second baseman and pinch hitter for the 1952 Chicago Cubs. The native of Shelby, North Carolina, threw and batted right-handed, stood 5 feet 10 inches (1.78 m) tall and weighed 165 pounds (75 kg). He served in the United States Army during World War II.

Hardin made the Cubs' early season roster in 1952 as a 29-year-old rookie after being selected in the 1951 Rule 5 draft out of the St. Louis Cardinals' organization. In his debut game on April 15, 1952, Hardin pinch hit for second baseman Bob Ramazzotti in the fourth inning of a game against the Cincinnati Reds at Crosley Field, then stayed in the game at second base, going hitless in four at bats but playing errorless ball in the field as the Cubs won, 6–5. His next appearance came a week later against the Pittsburgh Pirates at Forbes Field. He entered the game, a one-sided Chicago victory, in the fifth inning in relief of starting shortstop Leon Brinkopf. The following inning, Hardin collected his only Major League hit, a single off the Pirates' Jim Suchecki. Again he played errorless ball, handling two chances. In his final appearance, and lone game played at Wrigley Field, he was again a defensive replacement in the late innings of a winning Cubs' effort, taking over from Roy Smalley Jr. at shortstop. In his final MLB at bat, facing Clyde King, Hardin grounded out to his opposite number, Pee Wee Reese of the Brooklyn Dodgers. He also turned a double play.

During his minor league career, Hardin played in 1,347 games.
