= Nelson Field (Concordia, Texas) =

Baseball park in Austin, Texas, US

Coordinates: 30.323608°N 97.687920°W

Nelson Field is a baseball park located in Austin, Texas and the temporary home of the Concordia University Tornados until their new baseball facility is completed in time for the 2010 season. The former baseball facility, Keller-Faszholz Field, hosted its last game on April 19, 2008. For the 2009 season, the college team has also used Dell Diamond. The Tornados are a member of the American Southwest Conference.
