= Eddie Stanky =

American baseball player and manager (1915–1999)

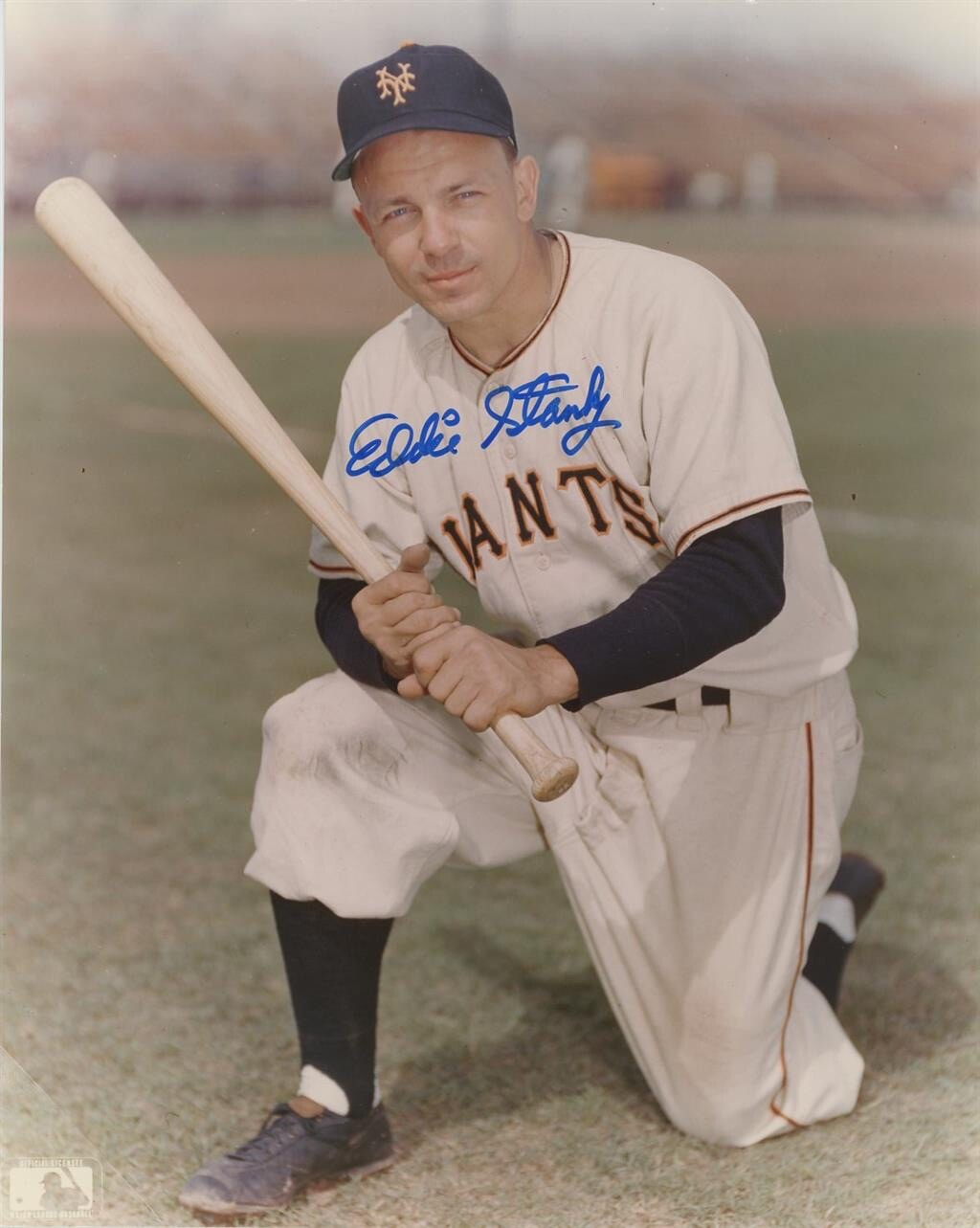
- Stanky with the New York Giants in 1950
- Second baseman / Manager
- Born: September 3, 1915; Philadelphia, Pennsylvania, U.S.
- Died: June 6, 1999 (aged 83); Fairhope, Alabama, U.S.
- Batted: Right Threw: Right

MLB debut
- April 21, 1943, for the Chicago Cubs

Last MLB appearance
- July 25, 1953, for the St. Louis Cardinals

MLB statistics
- Batting average: .268
- Home runs: 29
- Runs batted in: 364
- Managerial record: 467–435
- Winning %: .518
- Stats at Baseball Reference
- Managerial record at Baseball Reference

Teams
- As player: Chicago Cubs (1943–1944); Brooklyn Dodgers (1944–1947); Boston Braves (1948–1949); New York Giants (1950–1951); St. Louis Cardinals (1952–1953); As manager: St. Louis Cardinals (1952–1955); Chicago White Sox (1966–1968); Texas Rangers (1977)

Career highlights and awards
- 3× All-Star (1947, 1948, 1950)

Edward Raymond Stanky (né Stankiewicz) (September 3, 1915 – June 6, 1999) was an American professional baseball second baseman, shortstop, and manager. He played in Major League Baseball (MLB) for the Chicago Cubs, Brooklyn Dodgers, Boston Braves, New York Giants, and St. Louis Cardinals between 1943 and 1953. He was born in Philadelphia, Pennsylvania.

It took Stanky eight years to reach the major leagues at age 27 after starting out at Greenville, Mississippi, in the East Dixie League, where he was a teammate of future St. Louis Cardinals star Harry Brecheen, whom Stanky would manage in St. Louis in 1952. After spending a brief time as a player-manager, he transitioned to managing full-time, ending his MLB career in 1968, along with a brief return in 1977. In the interim, he had a successful run as an NCAA baseball manager.

== "He just knows how to win" ==
Stanky was famous for his ability to draw walks; he drew 100 or more walks in each of six different seasons, 140 or more in two of them. In 1946, he hit just .273 but his 137 walks allowed him to lead the league in OBP with .436, edging out Stan Musial—who led in more than ten hitting categories. His best season was probably 1950 with the Giants, when he hit an even .300 and led the league in walks (144) and OBP (.460). On August 30, he tied a major league record when he walked in seven consecutive plate appearances (in two games).

Leo Durocher, who managed him with the Dodgers and Giants, once summed up Stanky's talents: he said the second baseman "can't hit, can't run, can't field [but] he just knows how to win." Yankee shortstop Phil Rizzuto still complained years later about a notorious play during Game 3 of the 1951 World Series in which Stanky kicked the ball loose from Rizzuto's glove as he slid into second base, instrumental in the Giant win that put them ahead two games to one, although they lost the next three and the Series with it. Stanky himself said, "I would spike my mother if it meant being safe on a close play."

As a runner at third base with less than two out, he would station himself several feet back of the bag, in shallow left field. He would time the arc of any outfield fly and then take off running, step on third as the catch was being made and continue to run at full speed, making it almost impossible to throw him out at home, a tactic eventually outlawed as a result. He was also (in)famous for what came to be called "the Stanky maneuver", distracting opposing hitters by jumping up and down and waving his arms behind the pitcher from his second base position.

Stanky was also a master of the "delayed steal" in which the runner feigns disinterest after the pitch, but instead of walking back to first breaks for second as soon as the infielders return to their normal positions. As Cardinal player-manager, he would hold up games close to being called on account of darkness or curfew when that would benefit his team, by walking leisurely to the mound from second base or the dugout (when not playing) after every pitch to confer with his pitcher, eventually resulting in the one-trip-per-inning rule.

== Contribution to breaking the color barrier ==
Stanky contributed to the breaking of the color barrier as a member of the Brooklyn Dodgers in 1947. Upon first meeting Jackie Robinson at spring training, Stanky told him he was not in favor of integrating baseball, and he was unhappy that Jackie was now on his team, but that despite his own personal feelings, Robinson was now his teammate, and Stanky promised he would have his back. When Robinson began playing that season, he was treated harshly and discriminated against, and frequently taunted with insults and threats by players from the opposing teams. Stanky stayed silent at first, but finally yelled back at Ben Chapman's racist insults during a game. Not long afterward, the other Dodgers began to stand up for Robinson as well. The incident is portrayed in the film 42. Stanky is played by Jesse Luken.

Robinson, a natural second baseman, was shifted to first base in his rookie season as Stanky was already the Dodgers' second baseman and leadoff hitter. Robinson credited Stanky with giving him tips that made the transition to first base easier. Before the 1948 season began, Stanky was traded to the Boston Braves so that Robinson could return to his natural position and also bat leadoff. Stanky also demanded a trade because he thought Durocher had taken Branch Rickey's side in a salary dispute, which Stanky considered "a knife in my back." In Roger Kahn’s The Boys of Summer, he recounts an occasion in which Stanky, then managing the St. Louis Cardinals, angrily defended his players for shouting racial slurs against Jackie Robinson in a game. Stanky stated that they were “not out of line”, but rather part of the normal gamesmanship that was expected between rivals at the time.

== Manager of Cardinals and White Sox ==
He appeared in three World Series in the five years between 1947 and 1951—with three different National League champions, the Dodgers, Braves and Giants, all of whom lost to their American League opponents. In 1948, he was on pace to have his finest season. Batting .320 in July, his season was interrupted on July 8 when he broke his right leg in a collision with Bruce Edwards while trying to return to third base during a game. Originally expected to be out for just two weeks, Stanky did not play again for the Braves until September 19 and was used sparingly in the remainder of the regular season. Following the 1951 World Series, in which he played in all six games for the Giants but hit an anemic .136, he was traded to the Cardinals as player-manager.

In 1952, his Cardinals won seven more games than they had in 1951 and he was chosen Major League Manager of the Year by The Sporting News. The Cards advanced from fourth to third place in the National League standings, although finishing 151/2 games behind the pennant-winning Dodgers. But Stanky's time as Cardinal manager coincided with the slow decline of the team and its farm system from its glory days in the 1940s and the ownership transition from Fred Saigh to August "Gussie" Busch. On May 27, 1955, after a 17–19 start, he was fired.

Stanky then managed the Triple-A Minneapolis Millers (1956) before returning to the Majors as a coach for the Cleveland Indians (1957–58). He then spent almost six seasons in the Cardinal front office in charge of player development (1959–64), moving on to the New York Mets in a similar capacity in 1965.

In 1966, he succeeded Al López as the Chicago White Sox' manager. The White Sox had been runners-up in the American League (AL) for three successive seasons (1963–65), averaging almost 96 victories per year, but Stanky's maiden squad won only 83 games and fell to fourth place. However, his 1967 White Sox team — built on speed and pitching but hampered by an impotent offense — contended for the pennant until the last week of the season in a thrilling four-team race. But they lost their last five games to the lowly Kansas City Athletics and Washington Senators, and finished three games behind the surprise pennant winners, the "Impossible Dream" Boston Red Sox.

In 1968, the White Sox got off to a terrible start, losing their first ten games (extending their regular-season losing streak to 15 games dating from 1967). They recovered slightly but were only 34–45 on July 11, when Stanky was fired and López came out of retirement to reclaim his old job. One of his players, Tommy John, recalled that "When Eddie Stanky took over as manager of the White Sox in 1966, people would tell me what an absolute tyrant he was, an S.O.B., a slave driver. Yet I probably learned more baseball under Eddie than any manager I ever played for. I wish I could have played for him ten years. He was just that good."

Stanky used to have pitchers throw batting practice without a protective screen, presumably to encourage toughness. He would often walk up and down the dugout during a game asking players, "What's the count?" to ensure that they were paying attention to the game. He also expected his players to know the statistics of the opposing team. A pet peeve of his was when he would see players reading the Wall Street Journal. "Guys today are more worried about their investments than they are about their batting averages," Stanky complained.

== Success as college baseball coach ==
After his firing in Chicago, Stanky became the head baseball coach of the University of South Alabama in 1969, compiling a 490–195-2 (.714) record with five NCAA baseball tournament appearances over 14 seasons. He returned to MLB on June 22, 1977, as manager of the Texas Rangers, replacing Frank Lucchesi who was dismissed earlier that day despite the team being four games out of first place in the AL West. The 10–8 victory over the Minnesota Twins at Metropolitan Stadium later that night was the only Rangers game he would manage. He submitted his resignation due to homesickness the following day on June 23 and returned to college coaching at South Alabama. His 18 hours on the job is one of the shortest managerial stints in MLB history. According to Leo Durocher's autobiography, Stanky quit because he couldn't adapt to the attitudes of modern baseball players. He was succeeded on an interim basis by third‐base coach Connie Ryan and a more permanent one by Billy Hunter four days later on June 27. His career MLB managerial mark was 467–435 (.518).

Stanky was inducted into the Mobile Sports Hall of Fame in 1990. He died of a heart attack in 1999 at age 83 in Fairhope, Alabama. He was buried in the Catholic Cemetery of Mobile.

Eddie Stanky Field, the ballpark of the University of South Alabama baseball team, is named for him.

== Managerial record ==
Team	Year	Regular season					Postseason			
Team	Year	Games	Won	Lost	Win %	Finish	Won	Lost	Win %	Result
STL	1952	154	88	66	.571	3rd in NL	–	–	–	–
STL	1953	154	83	71	.539	3rd in NL	–	–	–	–
STL	1954	154	72	82	.468	6th in NL	–	–	–	–
STL	1955	36	17	19	.472	fired	–	–	–	–
STL total		498	260	238	.522		0	0	–	
CWS	1966	162	83	79	.512	4th in AL	–	–	–	–
CWS	1967	162	89	73	.549	4th in AL	–	–	–	–
CWS	1968	79	34	45	.430	fired	–	–	–	–
CWS total		403	206	197	.511		0	0	–	
TEX	1977	1	1	0	1.000	resigned	–	–	–	–
TEX total		1	1	0	1.000		0	0	–	
Total		902	467	435	.518		0	0	–	

== Legacy ==
Stanky was good friends with Alvin Dark, his roommate when the two played together on the Braves and Giants. As players, both dreamed of managing major league teams one day, and Dark spoke highly of Stanky's baseball intelligence. "Stanky knew so much more about the game than anybody else. If there were ten possible percentage plays to make, most guys would know four or five. Stanky would know ten." After their careers, the two did not correspond as much; Dark speculated this was because of his divorce, as Stanky was a devout Catholic.

== See also ==
- List of Major League Baseball annual runs scored leaders
- List of Major League Baseball player-managers

Sporting positions
Preceded by Bill Rigney	Minneapolis Millers manager 1956	Succeeded by Red Davis
