= Jack Faszholz =

American baseball player (1927–2017)

- Pitcher
- Born: April 11, 1927; St. Louis, Missouri, U.S.
- Died: March 25, 2017 (aged 89); Belle, Missouri, U.S.
- Batted: Right Threw: Right

MLB debut
- April 25, 1953, for the St. Louis Cardinals

Last MLB appearance
- May 30, 1953, for the St. Louis Cardinals

MLB statistics
- Win–loss record: 0–0
- Earned run average: 6.94
- Strikeouts: 7
- Stats at Baseball Reference

Teams
- St. Louis Cardinals (1953)

John Edward Faszholz (April 11, 1927 – March 25, 2017), nicknamed Preacher, was an American Major League Baseball pitcher who played for the St. Louis Cardinals in their 1953 season.

== Career and education ==
Faszholz went to spring training with the Cardinals in 1953 and 1955, and pitched a total of 11 2/3 innings at the National League level. However, most of his baseball career was spent playing for the Rochester Red Wings, then a Cardinals minor league affiliate.

Faszholz was inducted into the Red Wings Hall of Fame in 1990, winning more games than any other pitcher in franchise history with 80 career victories.

While playing professional baseball, he also attended Concordia Seminary in St. Louis, Missouri, during the fall semester of each year, beginning in 1947 and finally graduating in 1958. He then became an ordained pastor of the Lutheran Church–Missouri Synod and taught first at Lutheran high schools in St. Louis, then at Concordia University in Austin, Texas. He coached Concordia's baseball team, and the team's former stadium, Keller-Faszholz Field, was named after him and another coach, James Keller. Faszholz was inducted into Concordia's athletics hall of fame in 2014.

Faszholz died in 2017 in Belle, Missouri, at the age of 89.
