= Rock County Fairgrounds =

Coordinates: 42°41′32″N 89°00′18″W

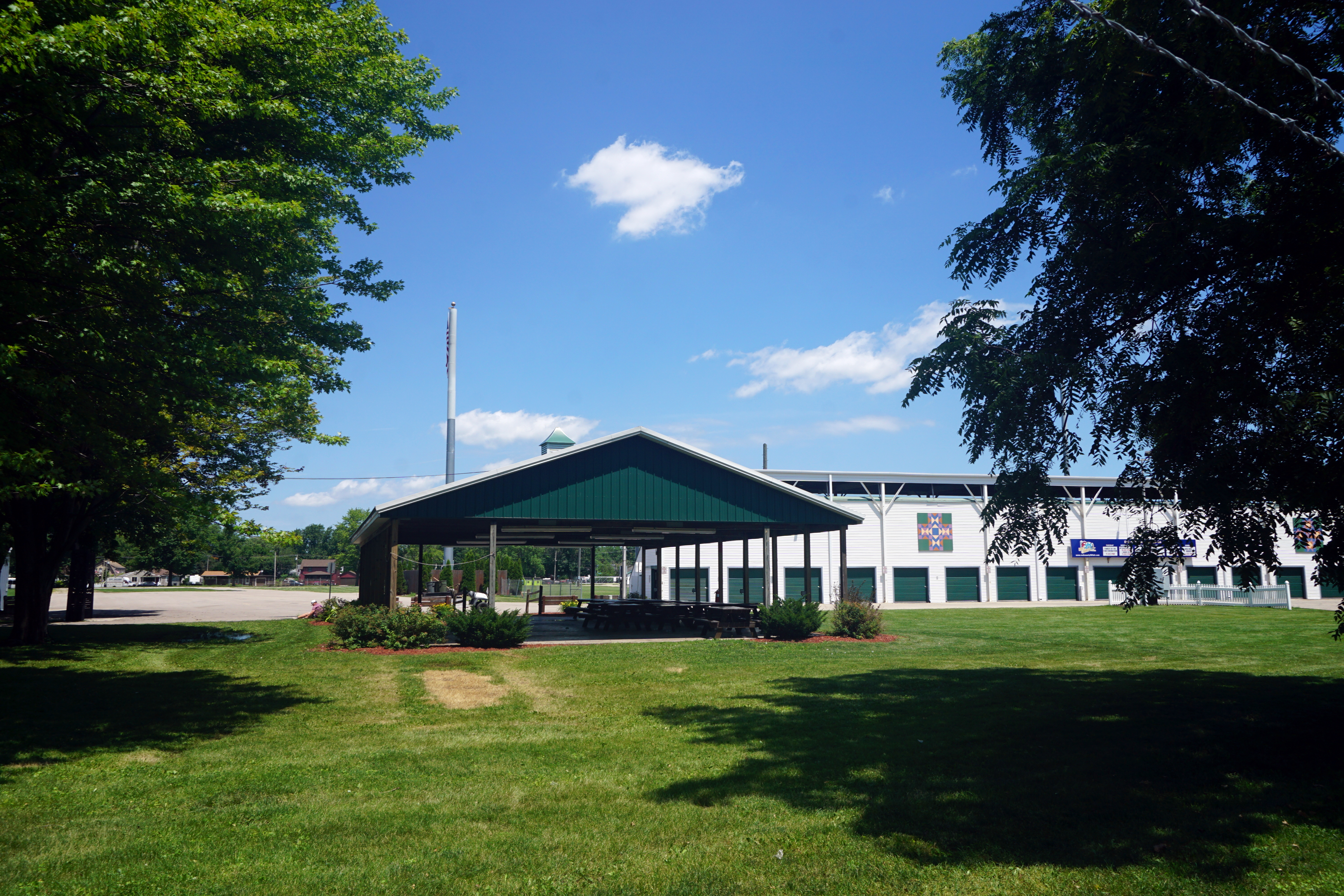
Rock County Fairgrounds

The Rock County Fairgrounds, also known as the Rock County 4-H Fairgrounds, is an 18.5 acre fairground located in Janesville, Wisconsin. It is the home of the Rock County 4-H Fair. It served as the home of the Janesville Cubs, a minor league baseball team, from 1941 to 1953.
