= St. Joseph Saints =

- 1886–1954; St. Joseph, Missouri

Minor league affiliations
- Previous classes: Class C; Class D
- Previous leagues: Western Association (1889, 1893-1897, 1906, 1927, 1939-1941, 1946-1951, 1953-1954); Western League (1886-1887, 1898, 1900-1905, 1910--1926, 1930-1935)

Major league affiliations
- Previous teams: St. Louis Cardinals (1930, 1946-1951, 1953); Chicago Cubs (1939-1940); St. Louis Browns (1941); New York Yankees (1954)

Minor league titles
- League titles: 6 (1933-1935, 1940, 1947-1948)

Team data
- Name: St. Joseph Saints
- Previous names: St. Joseph Reds (1886-1887); St. Joseph Clay Eaters (1889); St. Joseph Saints (1893-1897, 1898, 1900-1905, 1918-1927, 1940, 1930-1935, 1954); St. Joseph Packers (1906); St. Joseph Drummers(1910-1917); St. Joseph Angels (1939); St. Joseph Ponies (1941); St. Joseph Cardinals (1946-1951, 1953)
- Previous parks: Phil Welch Stadium

The Saint Joseph Saints was a primary name of the minor league baseball team that was based in St. Joseph, Missouri during various seasons between 1886 and 1953. Baseball Hall of Fame inductees Dizzy Dean and Earl Weaver played for St. Joseph teams.

== History ==
St. Joseph was a member of the Western Association (1889, 1893–1897, 1906, 1927, 1939–1941, 1946–1951, 1953–1954) and Western League (1886–1887, 1898, 1900–1905, 1910–1926, 1930–1935), They were an affiliate of the St. Louis Cardinals (1930, 1946–1951, 1953), the Chicago Cubs (1939–1940), St. Louis Browns (1941) and the New York Yankees (1954).

They won six championships. They won three straight league championships, from 1933 to 1935 and again in 1940, 1947 and 1948. Their first came under manager Dutch Zwilling. Their second Wes Griffin and Earle Brucker, and their third under Earle Brucker. They won the fourth league championship in 1940 under Keith Frazier the last two under Robert Stanton and Harold Olt.

In 1930, Dizzy Dean debuted his professional career with St. Joseph, going 17–8 in 32 games with a 3.69 ERA.

The 1941 team moved to Carthage, Missouri on June 3, 1941.

== The ballpark ==
Later St. Joseph teams played at Phil Welch Stadium beginning in 1939. The stadium is still in use today had been home to the St. Joseph Mustangs, a collegiate summer baseball league team in the MINK League since 2009. The address is 2600 Southwest Parkway, St. Joseph, 64503.

== Notable St. Joseph alumni ==
- Dizzy Dean (1930) Inducted Baseball Hall of Fame, 1953
- Earl Weaver (1949) Inducted Baseball Hall of Fame, 1996
- Babe Adams (1917)
- Cy Blanton (1933) 2 x MLB All-Star; 1935 NL ERA Title
- Mace Brown (1930) MLB All-Star
- Pete Coscarart (1935)
- Joe Cunningham (1950 2 x MLB All-Star
- Paul Erickson (1939)
- Vern Kennedy (1932) 2 x MLB All-Star
- Bill Lee (1930) 5 x MLB All-Star; 1938 NL ERA Title
- Dutch Leonard (1931) 5 x MLB All-Star
- Peanuts Lowrey (1939) MLB All-Star
- Sherry Magee (1923) 1910 NL Batting Title
- Fritz Ostermueller (1930)
- Vern Rapp (1947)
- Lew Riggs (1930) MLB All-Star
