= Chris Haughey =

American baseball player (1925–2022)

- Pitcher
- Born: October 3, 1925; Astoria, New York, U.S.
- Died: April 24, 2022 (aged 96); Salinas, California, U.S.
- Batted: Right Threw: Right

MLB debut
- October 3, 1943, for the Brooklyn Dodgers

Last MLB appearance
- October 3, 1943, for the Brooklyn Dodgers

MLB statistics
- Win–loss record: 0–1
- Earned run average: 3.86
- Strikeouts: 0
- Stats at Baseball Reference

Teams
- Brooklyn Dodgers (1943)

Christopher Francis Haughey (October 3, 1925 – April 24, 2022), nicknamed "Bud", was an American pitcher who appeared in one game for the Brooklyn Dodgers of Major League Baseball during the 1943 season. At 18 years of age, the 6 ft 1 in (1.85 m), 180 lb (82 kg) rookie was the second-youngest player to appear in a National League game that season.

Haughey is one of many ballplayers who only appeared in the major leagues during World War II. His major league debut happened to be on his 18th birthday, and it was the last game of the season. He pitched seven innings of relief against the Cincinnati Reds at Crosley Field, giving up five hits, ten walks, and six runs (three earned) in a 6–1 loss. Johnny Vander Meer was the winning pitcher. His career ended with a 0–1 record and a 3.86 ERA. Five other players made their Major League debut on the same day, October 3, 1943, as Haughey: Norm Brown, Hank Camelli, Cookie Cuccurullo, Gil Hodges, and Tony Ordenana.

After losing two seasons to the war in 1944–45, Haughey returned to the Dodgers and played in the minor leagues to work on his fastball. He would be signed by the St. Louis Cardinals, and remained in the minors for five seasons through 1950, winning fifteen games for the St. Joseph Cardinals of the Class C Western Association in 1947. Afterwards, Haughey attended Fordham University, graduating with a degree in physics. He worked for a New York oil company, and then in retail, firstly for his brother-in-law's store in Salinas, California, of which he was a part-owner, and then for a Macy's store in Pleasanton, California. He later lived in Fremont, California, before moving back to Salinas, where he was in a rehabilitation center at the time of his death.

Haughey died on April 24, 2022, at the age of 96. He was the last living major league baseball player from the 1943 season.
