= Cal Howe =

American baseball player (1924–2008)

- Pitcher
- Born: November 27, 1924; Rock Falls, Illinois, U.S.
- Died: May 5, 2008 (aged 83); Grand Rapids, Michigan, U.S.
- Batted: Left Threw: Left

MLB debut
- September 26, 1952, for the Chicago Cubs

Last MLB appearance
- September 26, 1952, for the Chicago Cubs

MLB statistics
- Win–loss record: 0–0
- Earned run average: 0.00
- Innings pitched: 2
- Stats at Baseball Reference

Teams
- Chicago Cubs (1952)

Calvin Earl Howe (November 27, 1924 – May 5, 2008) was an American professional baseball player who appeared in one game in Major League Baseball as a relief pitcher for the Chicago Cubs during the 1952 season. Listed at 6 feet 3 inches (1.91 m) and 230 pounds (100 kg), Howe batted and threw left-handed. He was born in Rock Falls, Illinois.

In his one relief appearance, on September 26, 1952, against the St. Louis Cardinals at Sportsman's Park, Howe posted a perfect 0.00 ERA without a decision or save, giving up one walk (to Solly Hemus), while striking out two (Dick Sisler and Gerry Staley) in two hitless innings of work.

Howe's minor league career lasted for eleven seasons (1942; 1948–1957); he won 99 games (losing 70) and posted a 3.49 ERA in 1,337 innings pitched.

== See also ==
- 1952 Chicago Cubs season
- Cup of coffee
