= Dick Manville =

American baseball player (1925–2019)

- Pitcher
- Born: December 31, 1926; Des Moines, Iowa, U.S.
- Died: February 13, 2019 (aged 92); Winter Springs, Florida, U.S.
- Batted: Right Threw: Right

MLB debut
- April 30, 1950, for the Boston Braves

Last MLB appearance
- September 10, 1952, for the Chicago Cubs

MLB statistics
- Win–loss record: 0–0
- Earned run average: 7.11
- Strikeouts: 8
- Stats at Baseball Reference

Teams
- Boston Braves (1950); Chicago Cubs (1952)

Richard Wesley Manville (December 31, 1926 – February 13, 2019) was an American professional baseball pitcher who appeared in 12 games (all in relief) over parts of two seasons in Major League Baseball for the 1950 Boston Braves and 1952 Chicago Cubs. Born in Des Moines, Iowa, Manville attended Yale University before serving in the United States Navy during World War II, then Harvard University after the war. He lettered in basketball, baseball, ice hockey and soccer.

The right-hander was listed as 6 feet 4 inches (1.93 m) tall and 192 pounds (87 kg). His pro career lasted six seasons, 1947–1950 and 1952–1953. In his National League debut on April 30, 1950, against the Philadelphia Phillies, Manville threw two scoreless innings of relief, without allowing a hit, in a 9–3 Boston defeat at Shibe Park. It was his only appearance for the Braves; he was sent to the minor leagues thereafter and was acquired by the Cubs on May 15.

In his 12 MLB games, Manville allowed 25 hits and 15 bases on balls, along with 15 earned runs. He was credited with eight strikeouts. He did not earn a decision or a save, and posted a 7.11 career ERA.

Manville died at age 92 on February 13, 2019, in Winter Springs, Florida.
