= Fred Marolewski =

American baseball player (1928–2023)

- First baseman
- Born: October 6, 1928; Chicago, Illinois, U.S.
- Died: February 28, 2023 (aged 94); Palos Heights, Illinois, U.S.
- Batted: Right Threw: Right

MLB debut
- September 19, 1953, for the St. Louis Cardinals

Last MLB appearance
- September 19, 1953, for the St. Louis Cardinals

MLB statistics
- Games played: 1
- At bats: 0
- Stats at Baseball Reference

Teams
- St. Louis Cardinals (1953)

Fred Daniel Marolewski (October 6, 1928 – February 28, 2023) was an American professional baseball player whose eight-season career (1948–1950; 1953–1957) included one inning in one game played in Major League Baseball as a member of the 1953 St. Louis Cardinals. He was born in Chicago, Illinois, threw and batted right-handed, and was listed as 6 feet 2 inches (1.88 m) tall and 205 pounds (93 kg).

Marolewski was recalled by the Cardinals in September 1953 after spending most of the season with the Houston Buffaloes of the Double-A Texas League. On the 19th, Marolewski entered an extra-inning game between St. Louis and the Chicago Cubs at Sportsman's Park in the top of the 12th frame as a defensive replacement for first baseman Steve Bilko. During that half-inning, the Cubs took a three-run lead on the strength of RBI hits by future Hall of Famers Ralph Kiner and Ernie Banks. Both Retrosheet and Baseball Reference record that Marolewski had no fielding chances during the Cubs' half of the 12th. In the Cardinals' half of the inning, he was left in the on-deck circle when Ray Jablonski made the final out of the game, denying Marolewski an MLB at bat.

Marolewski returned to the Texas League in 1954. As a player in minor league baseball, Marolewski played in 1,077 games and smashed over 100 home runs.

Marolewski died on February 28, 2023, at the age of 94.
