= Neal Hertweck =

American baseball player (born 1931)

- First baseman
- Born: November 22, 1931 (age 94); St. Louis, Missouri, U.S.
- Batted: Left Threw: Left

MLB debut
- September 27, 1952, for the St. Louis Cardinals

Last MLB appearance
- September 28, 1952, for the St. Louis Cardinals

MLB statistics
- Games played: 2
- At bats: 6
- Hits: 0
- Stats at Baseball Reference

Teams
- St. Louis Cardinals (1952)

Neal Charles Hertweck (born November 22, 1931) is an American former professional baseball player, a first baseman who appeared in two Major League Baseball games for the St. Louis Cardinals in 1952. He threw and batted left-handed, stood 6 feet 1 inch (1.85 m) tall and weighed 175 pounds (79 kg).

Born in St. Louis, Hertweck attended Washington University in St. Louis (where he played baseball) and the University of Missouri. His professional career lasted for eight seasons (1949–56) with his only audition for the MLB Cardinals happening after the 1952 campaign, during which Hertweck appeared in 152 games for the Omaha Cardinals of the Class A Western League. He started two games at first base on September 27–28 and went hitless in six at bats against Bob Rush and Paul Minner of the Chicago Cubs. He reached base once on a walk.
