= Vern Fear =

American baseball player (1925–1976)

- Pitcher
- Born: August 21, 1925; Everly, Iowa, U.S.
- Died: September 6, 1976 (aged 51); Spencer, Iowa, U.S.
- Batted: Both Threw: Right

MLB debut
- August 3, 1952, for the Chicago Cubs

Last MLB appearance
- September 3, 1952, for the Chicago Cubs

MLB statistics
- Win–loss record: 0–0
- Earned run average: 7.88
- Strikeouts: 4
- Stats at Baseball Reference

Teams
- Chicago Cubs (1952)

Luvern Carl Fear (August 21, 1925 – September 6, 1976) was an American pitcher in Major League Baseball. He played for the Chicago Cubs.
