= Janesville Cubs =

- 1941–1953; (1941-1942, 1946-1953); Janesville, Wisconsin

Minor league affiliations
- Previous classes: Class D
- League: Wisconsin State League

Major league affiliations
- Previous teams: Chicago Cubs

Team data
- Previous names: Janesville Cubs (1947-1953); Janesville Bears (1946); Janesville Cubs (1941-1942)

The Janesville Cubs were a minor league baseball team that existed from 1941 to 1942 and from 1946 to 1953. Affiliated with the Chicago Cubs, they played in the Wisconsin State League. They were based in Janesville, Wisconsin and played their home games at the Rock County 4-H Fairgrounds. They were also known as the Janesville Bears in 1946.

== Year-by-year record ==
Year	Record	Finish	Manager	Playoffs
1941	38-72	7th	Eddie Stumpf	
1942	51-58	5th	Eddie Stumpf	
1947	66-54	2nd	Frank Piet	none
1948	46-79	8th	Frank Kristie / Lou Bekeza	none
1949	50-75	8th	Jim Oglesby / Michael Frederick / Adolph Matulis	none
1950	70-54	3rd	Adolph Matulis	Lost League Finals
1951	56-64	7th	Adolph Matulis	none
1952	54-66	7th	Harry Bright	none
1953	43-80	8th	Robert Dant	
