= The Winning Team =

1952 American film by Lewis Seiler

- Theatrical release poster
- Directed by: Lewis Seiler
- Screenplay by: Ted Sherdeman; Seeleg Lester; Merwin Gerard
- Story by: Seeleg Lester; Merwin Gerard
- Produced by: Bryan Foy
- Starring: Doris Day; Ronald Reagan; Frank Lovejoy
- Cinematography: Sidney Hickox
- Edited by: Alan Crosland Jr.
- Music by: David Buttolph
- Production company: Warner Bros. Pictures
- Distributed by: Warner Bros. Pictures
- Release date: June 20, 1952
- Running time: 98 minutes
- Country: United States
- Language: English
- Box office: $1.7 million

The Winning Team is a 1952 American biographical film starring Ronald Reagan and Doris Day, and directed by Lewis Seiler. It is a fictionalized biography of the life of major league pitcher Grover Cleveland Alexander.

It includes Alexander's heroic performance in three games in the 1926 World Series against the New York Yankees, where the seventh inning strikeout of Tony Lazzeri is used as the game-ending, Series-winning pitch.

The film earned an estimated $1.7 million at the North American box office in 1952.

== Plot ==
Grover Cleveland Alexander (Ronald Reagan) is working as a telephone lineman in Elba, Nebraska. While Alex is speaking with his boss, a man comes along and tells them that there is an exhibition baseball game between some local farmers and a minor league baseball team. Alex runs straight there.

Meanwhile, his fiancée Aimee (Doris Day) is talking with her father, who doesn't have the best opinion of Alex because he is more interested in baseball than in farming. He is worried about his daughter's future.

The game between the farmers and the team is a betting place. Many come to see this game and they know that with Alex pitching they can't lose. Alex strikes out everyone in this game. When he wins the game he returns home.

Aimee is at home waiting for Alex. Her father offers to put a down payment on a farm for her. After a small argument, Aimee switches to her father's side and promises that Alex will not play baseball.

Alex and Aimee attend a church meeting where an invited guest is to show film shots of his recent journey to Norway. As he begins to speak, the noise of a backfiring automobile is heard. The driver opens the door to the church and announces that he is looking for Alex. He finally sees Alex and asks him to come outside with him, where he asks Alex if he can really pitch like he did at the earlier game or was it a fluke. Alex learns he is the manager of the team he beat, and throws some pitches to him. Aimee is inside, listening to the presentation, which is now interrupted by the sound of a ball hitting a glove over and over. Alex is offered $100 a month if he will consider playing for his team. Alex agrees to play and is shown playing baseball with the new team, the Galesburg Boosters. He regularly sends home a baseball card with his picture along with money so he can buy the farm for him and his fiancée.

During one of the games Alex is struck in the head by a thrown ball while running bases. He wakes up three days later in the hospital with Aimee and his mother by his side. The injury ends his 1909 season of baseball.

During the off-season between 1909 and 1910, Alex now has enough money to buy that farm and marry Aimee. After arriving at the farm he goes out back and starts chucking mud balls at a fence. His eyes are out of whack and he sees everything double. He hires a catcher to catch for him and he is always just a bit off because of his eyesight.

In 1910 he returns to baseball after he wakes up one morning and his eyes are perfect again. His record during that year is 29-11 playing for the Syracuse Stars in the class B New York State League. Then he is sold to the Philadelphia Phillies for $750.

The scene turns to what Doris Day is known for: a Christmas at the farm where the family is gathered around and Aimee sings.

The movie returns to baseball. Alex's official Major League baseball debut is with the Phillies on April 15, 1911. He throws five innings of no-hit, no-run baseball. During another game he is facing Rogers Hornsby. The catcher passes on a tidbit of info that if Hornsby strikes out he will be booted off the team. Alex tells the catcher what the next pitches will be and Hornsby is able to connect with one of them.

Alex spends most of 1918 in France as a sergeant with a field artillery unit where he is exposed to mustard gas, and a shell that explodes near him causes partial hearing loss as well as epileptic seizures. He has also developed a drinking problem. He returns to the States and continues pitching in 1919.

He is traded from Philadelphia to Chicago and pitches for the Cubs during the 1920 season where he wins the pitching Triple Crown. While playing a game at Forbes Field his hearing problem returns. In the sixth inning while on the mound, Alex collapses and his teammates carry him off the field. It turns out to be an epileptic seizure.

Alex's doctor tells him that if he wants to live he should probably go back to farm life. Alex will not hear of that. He tells the doctor that he really does not want his wife Aimee to know.

As Alex is walking down the street, he passes a bar and the doorman recognizes him and invites him in for a drink "on the house". He becomes totally inebriated. As he lays his head down on his arm a customer walks to a telephone booth. He asks for the sports desk and tells the person who answers that he knows why Alex fell at the ballgame today: "He's a lush." The papers are filled with stories of Alex's drinking problem. The scene changes to a baseball game where Alex fields a ball and basically throws it away to the first baseman. He is removed from the game.

Drinking seems to have become Alex's new pastime. He is removed from the Cubs and sent to a team playing for the House of David. All this time his wife is trying to find him. She finally finds out that he is a main headliner at a circus, touted as the man who can answer any and all questions about baseball - and specifically about pitching. Aimee buys a ticket, but when he comes out from the rear of the tent, she hides. He spews out many facts and figures about his own career and then asks if anyone has any questions. Aimee leaves without contacting him.

When Aimee does get in touch with him she tells him that she knows of his medical conditions. At Aimee's request, his old friend Rogers Hornsby contacts him and offers him a pitching job with the St. Louis Cardinals.

At the 1926 World Series, the St. Louis Cardinals and the New York Yankees are squaring off. Alex pitches the second and the sixth games of the series and they win both of them. At the conclusion of the sixth game Alex and Aimee have a conversation in the tunnel of the stadium; it's here that she learns that he looks to her for strength while pitching.

The Cardinals tie up the series at 3-3. It is now the seventh game. Aimee is not at the stadium because she is packing for a vacation that will start as soon as the game is over. Alex is not expected to pitch today at all. They are at Sportsman's Park in St. Louis and in the seventh inning the pitcher of record has allowed the bases to be loaded. Player-manager Rogers Hornsby pulls the pitcher. He gets a message to the bullpen for Alex to come out and pitch. When Alex gets to the mound he looks and finds that Aimee is not there. Aimee is ready to call for a taxi when she reads on the ticker-tape board across the street that her husband has now been called on to pitch. She has the bellhop at the curb get her a taxi right away so she can get to the stadium.

While she is in traffic, Alex is pitching without her as his rock. He pitches out of the inning and Aimee arrives at the stadium before the ninth inning. She sits in her chair and he sees her. The Cardinals win the series.

== Cast ==
- Ronald Reagan as Grover Cleveland Alexander
- Doris Day as Aimee Alexander
- Frank Lovejoy as Rogers Hornsby
- Eve Miller as Margaret Killefer
- James Millican as Bill Killefer
- Russ Tamblyn as Willie Alexander
- Gordon Jones as George Glasheen
- Hugh Sanders as Joe McCarthy
- Frank Ferguson as Sam Arrants
- Walter Baldwin as Pa Alexander
- Dorothy Adams as Ma Alexander
- Bob Lemon as Jesse "Pop" Haines
- Jerry Priddy as Ballplayer
- Peanuts Lowrey as Ballplayer
- George Metkovich as Ballplayer
- Henry Blair as Batboy
- Jimmy Dodd as Fred
- Pat Rosson as Aimee's father (uncredited)

== See also ==
- List of baseball films
