= Bob Usher =

American baseball player (1925–2014)

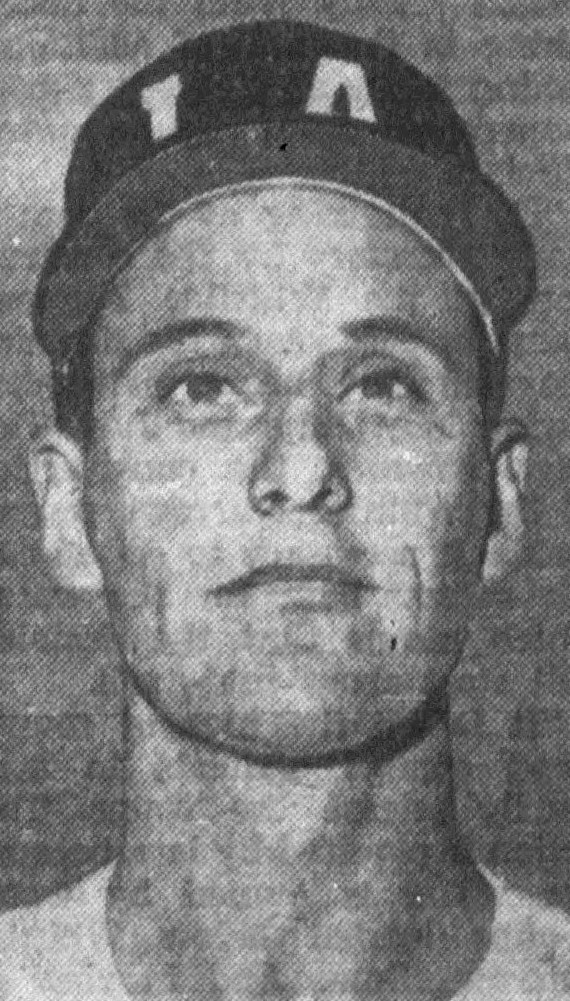
- Usher, circa 1954
- Outfielder
- Born: March 1, 1925; San Diego, California, U.S.
- Died: December 29, 2014 (aged 89); San Jose, California, U.S.
- Batted: Right Threw: Right

MLB debut
- April 16, 1946, for the Cincinnati Reds

Last MLB appearance
- September 19, 1957, for the Washington Senators

MLB statistics
- Batting average: .235
- Home runs: 18
- Runs batted in: 102
- Stats at Baseball Reference

Teams
- Cincinnati Reds (1946–1947, 1950–1951); Chicago Cubs (1952); Cleveland Indians (1957); Washington Senators (1957)

Robert Royce Usher (March 1, 1925 – December 29, 2014) was an American Major League Baseball outfielder who played in parts of six seasons, appearing first for the Cincinnati Reds during 1946 and 1947, then in 1950 and 1951. He also played for the Chicago Cubs in 1952, and the Cleveland Indians and Washington Senators in 1957.

== Biography ==
Usher was signed as a free agent by the Reds prior to the 1943 season, making his debut on April 16, 1946 following naval service in World War II.
