= Bill Serena =

American baseball player (1924–1996)

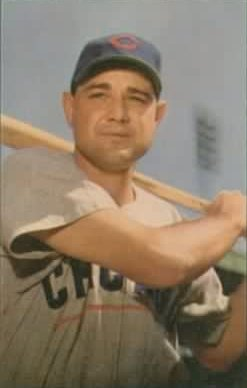
- Third baseman
- Born: October 2, 1924; Alameda, California, U.S.
- Died: April 17, 1996 (aged 71); Hayward, California, U.S.
- Batted: Right Threw: Right

MLB debut
- September 16, 1949, for the Chicago Cubs

Last MLB appearance
- August 7, 1954, for the Chicago Cubs

MLB statistics
- Batting average: .251
- Home runs: 48
- Runs batted in: 198
- Stats at Baseball Reference

Teams
- Chicago Cubs (1949–1954)

William Robert Serena (October 2, 1924 – April 17, 1996) was an American professional baseball player who played infield in the Major Leagues from 1949 to 1954 for the Chicago Cubs.

After his playing career was over, Serena worked as a baseball scout.

He was born in Alameda, California and died in Hayward, California where he was cremated.
