= Eddie Phillips (pinch runner) =

American baseball player (1930–2010)

- Pinch runner
- Born: July 8, 1930; St. Louis, Missouri, U.S.
- Died: September 9, 2010 (aged 80); Hannibal, Missouri, U.S.
- Batted: Both Threw: Right

MLB debut
- September 10, 1953, for the St. Louis Cardinals

Last MLB appearance
- September 26, 1953, for the St. Louis Cardinals

MLB statistics
- Games played: 9
- Runs: 4
- Stats at Baseball Reference

Teams
- St. Louis Cardinals (1953)

Howard Edward Phillips (July 8, 1930 – September 9, 2010) was an American professional baseball player. In Major League Baseball, he appeared solely as a pinch runner for the St. Louis Cardinals during the 1953 season. Listed at 6' 1", 180 lb., he was a switch-hitter and threw right-handed.

== Early life ==
A native of St. Louis, Missouri, Eddie Phillips was one of four sons born to Raymond and Estella (née Schaffer) Phillips. He grew up in Hannibal, approximately 100 miles (160 km) northwest of St. Louis, after his father, a railroad engineer, was transferred there. Phillips was an all-around athlete at Hannibal High School, where he played baseball, basketball and football, in addition to competing in track. He was signed by the St. Louis Cardinals after graduation in 1949 and was assigned to the Class-D West Frankfort Cardinals in 1950.

== Playing career ==
Phillips had the ability to play at all three outfield positions, mainly at center field, and also was a competent third baseman. In his first minor league season, he hit .297 with a slugging percentage of .423 in 117 games, while stealing 36 bases and scoring 119 runs. He was promoted to the Class-C St. Joseph Cardinals in 1951, ending with a .307 average and 28 stolen bases while leading Western Association hitters with 14 triples.

In 1952, Phillips played for Class-A Omaha and captured the Western League batting crown with a .320 average in 145 games. The next season, he batted .306 in 107 games for Double-A Houston Buffaloes, dividing his playing time between the Buffaloes and Triple-A Columbus Red Birds in 1954. That year he hit a combined .255 average in 123 games before joining the big team in late September. Phillips appeared in nine games with the Cardinals as a pinch runner. He never batted or fielded a ball in the majors, but scored four runs.

In each of the next two seasons, Phillips was invited to the Cardinals' spring training, but he wound up being assigned to Class AAA. The Cards already had Stan Musial, Red Schoendienst, Ray Jablonski, Enos Slaughter and Rip Repulski in the outfield. Phillips stuck it out in the minors until 1960, playing for eight different teams in the Cardinals, White Sox, Orioles, Braves and Phillies farm systems. He then left baseball, realizing he would never be called to the majors again. In an 11-season career, he was a .273 hitter (1121-for-4109) in 1268 games, including 166 doubles, 55 triples, 85 home runs and 90 stolen bases, driving in 313 runs while scoring 329 times.

== Later life ==
He married Joyce Easley in 1959, and they had one son, a daughter and five grandchildren. Phillips died in his home of Hannibal at the age of 80.
