= Fred Hahn =

American baseball player (1929–1984)

- Pitcher
- Born: February 16, 1929; Nyack, New York, U.S.
- Died: August 16, 1984 (aged 55); Valhalla, New York, U.S.
- Batted: Right Threw: Left

MLB debut
- April 19, 1952, for the St. Louis Cardinals

Last MLB appearance
- April 19, 1952, for the St. Louis Cardinals

MLB statistics
- Games played: 1
- Innings pitched: 2
- Earned runs: 0
- Stats at Baseball Reference

Teams
- St. Louis Cardinals (1952)

Frederick Aloys Hahn (February 16, 1929 – August 16, 1984) was an American professional baseball pitcher who worked in one game in Major League Baseball (MLB) for the St. Louis Cardinals in 1952. Despite his brief MLB tenure, Hahn, a left-hander from Nyack, New York, had a 13-year (1947–1959) professional career. He was listed as 6 feet 3 inches (1.91 m) tall and 174 pounds (79 kg).

In his lone big-league appearance, on April 19, 1952, at Wrigley Field, Hahn was called into the contest in the seventh inning with the Chicago Cubs in command, 6–0. He pitched the seventh and eighth innings and allowed two unearned runs, two hits and one base on balls. He spent the rest of 1952 at Triple-A Rochester.
