= Harry Elliott (baseball) =

American baseball player (1923–2013)

- Outfielder
- Born: December 30, 1923; San Francisco, California, U.S.
- Died: August 9, 2013 (aged 89); Little River, Kansas, U.S.
- Batted: Right Threw: Right

MLB debut
- August 1, 1953, for the St. Louis Cardinals

Last MLB appearance
- September 25, 1955, for the St. Louis Cardinals

MLB statistics
- Batting average: .256
- Home runs: 2
- Runs batted in: 18
- Stats at Baseball Reference

Teams
- St. Louis Cardinals (1953, 1955)

Harry Lewis Elliott (December 30, 1923 – August 9, 2013) was an American professional baseball player who appeared in 92 games in Major League Baseball for the 1953 and 1955 St. Louis Cardinals. A 5 ft 9 in (1.75 m), 175 lb (79 kg) outfielder, Elliott threw and batted right-handed.

== Early life ==
Elliott was born in San Francisco, California. As a youth, his family moved to Watertown, Minnesota. He played piano professionally from the age of 15, playing Big Band music until the mid-1990s. Elliott graduated from Watertown High School in 1942. He was a standout athlete, lettering two years each in football, basketball and baseball and earned All-Conference and All-District honors. Elliott then attended the University of Minnesota where he was a member of Phi Sigma Kappa fraternity, earning three varsity letters in both football and baseball. In 1949, he was their first athlete to earn first-team Big Ten honors in the sport of baseball. He then spent a short time teaching in Austin, Minnesota.

Elliott started playing professional baseball at the relatively advanced age of 27 and put up prodigious batting numbers in his early seasons in minor league baseball. He batted .391 with 221 hits for the 1951 Alexandria Aces of the Class D Evangeline League, notched 204 hits one year later in the Double-A Texas League with the Shreveport Sports, and in 1954 batted .350 with 224 hits, 42 doubles, 15 home runs and 110 runs batted in in 168 games for the San Diego Padres of the Open Classification Pacific Coast League. In his seven-year minor league career, Elliott batted .326 lifetime.

Acquired by the Cardinals in December 1952, he was batting .321 for their Houston Buffaloes farm club in 1953 when he was called up for the final two months of the Major League season with the Redbirds. Although he struck out against Brooklyn Dodgers left-hander Preacher Roe in his debut on August 1, Elliott gained a measure of revenge against Roe exactly one month later, with three hits in four at bats, including his first MLB home run.

Elliott spent the entire 1954 season in the Pacific Coast League — then vying for possible Major League status as an "Open" (one level above Triple-A) circuit — and was named a PCL all-star because of his stellar season with San Diego. Reacquired by the Cardinals, he spent the entire 1955 season on their roster, appearing in 29 games in the field and in more than 40 games as a pinch hitter. He had two of his best games against Chicago Cubs southpaw Paul Minner, with three hits on May 30 and two more, including his second and final Major League home run, off Minner on September 19. Elliott was featured on the cover of Sports Illustrated magazine in March 1956.

All told, Elliott collected 45 hits, including ten doubles and one triple in the majors. He retired from professional baseball after the 1958 season.

== Retirement ==
Following his retirement from baseball, Elliott taught physical education at El Cajon Valley High School. Throughout his 27 years of teaching, he also coached baseball, football, basketball and soccer.

Elliott subsequently spent 30 years in retirement in Yuma, Arizona, and frequently traveled in his motor home.

== Death ==
Elliott spent the final days of his life in Lyons, Kansas, with his family by his side. He died on August 9, 2013, at the Sandstone Heights Nursing Home in Little River, Kansas.
