= Adolph Matulis =

American college athlete and professional baseball player

- Matulis, c. 1942

Personal information
- Born: August 3, 1920 East Chicago, Indiana, U.S.
- Died: May 25, 2002 (aged 81)
- Education: University of Arizona
- Years active: 1940-1941
- Height: 5 ft 10 in (178 cm)
- Weight: 183 lb (83 kg; 13 st 1 lb)

Sport
- Sport: Baseball, Basketball, Football
- Position: Pitcher (baseball); Guard (basketball); Fullback / Quarterback (football)

Adolph John Matulis (Note: Matulis' nicknames included A.J., Matt, and Pops.) (August 3, 1920 – May 25, 2002) was an American college athlete at the University of Arizona who earned varsity letters in baseball, basketball, and football. He went on to a minor league baseball career as a pitcher and player-manager.

== College athletics ==
Matulis earned varsity letters for the Arizona Wildcats football team in 1940 and 1941; the 1941 Wildcats were champions of the Border Conference. He joined the team as a freshman in 1940 and was originally a fullback. He later played quarterback for the team. He also played baseball and basketball for the school, lettering on each of those teams in 1941.

== Professional baseball ==
Adolph Matulis
- Pitcher / Manager
- Born: August 3, 1920; East Chicago, Indiana
- Died: May 25, 2002 (aged 81)
- Batted: Right Threw: Right
- Stats at Baseball Reference

Listed at 5 feet 10 inches (1.78 m) and 183 pounds (83 kg), Matulis threw and batted right-handed.

=== Playing career ===
Matulis pitched in the Chicago Cubs system in 1942 and from 1946 to 1952. With the Class-B Madison Blues of the Three-I League in 1942, he had a 9–13 win–loss record with a 4.39 earned run average (ERA) in 37 games. He tied for second in the league in losses and was third in games started. As a hitter, he batted .200 (13-for-65).

After serving in the military, Matulis returned to professional baseball in 1946, playing for the Class-A Macon Peaches of the South Atlantic League (SAL). He went 17–15 with a 3.39 ERA on the mound and contributed a .206 batting average. That year, he led the SAL in losses, appearances, hits allowed and earned runs allowed. Matulis pitched for the Double-A Nashville Volunteers of the Southern Association in 1947, going 8–9 with a 5.18 ERA in 38 appearances. He also had a .167 batting average. In 1948, he hit .358 (76-for-212) with four home runs and a .514 slugging percentage for the Class-D Elizabethton Betsy Cubs of the Appalachian League. He also went 1–4 with a 4.50 ERA in 22 appearances on the mound.

Matulis played for the Class-C Clinton Steers of the Central Association and the Class-D Janesville Cubs of the Wisconsin State League in 1949. He hit a combined .256 in 71 games, and had a 3–2 record pitching with Janesville, with a 2.45 ERA in 16 games. He spent all of the 1950 and 1951 seasons with Janesville, with pitching records of 12–6 and 4–4, and batting averages of .300 and .305, respectively. In 1950, He led the Wisconsin State League in ERA (1.84). In 1952, Matulis' final season, he played for the Class-C Topeka Owls of the Western Association, where he was 9–2 with a 5.07 ERA in 15 appearances as a pitcher. At the plate, he hit .295 with two home runs.

Overall, Matulis played eight years in the minor leagues, going 63–55 with a 3.86 ERA in 214 pitching appearances. In 1,078 innings pitched, he allowed 1,125 hits and 461 walks. As a batter, he hit .282 with 13 home runs in 1,007 at bats.

=== Managerial career ===
Matulis was a player-manager for part of five seasons. His first season managing was 1948, when he led Elizabethton to a 64–61 fifth-place finish. In 1949, he was one of three managers for Janesville, and one of two managers for Clinton. In 1950, he led Janesville to a 70–54 third-place finish and a berth in the playoffs, where the team lost in the final round. He managed Janesville to a 56–64 seventh-place finish in 1951. In 1952, he managed Topeka to a 63–76 record.

== Personal life ==
Matulis was born in 1920 in East Chicago, Indiana. He did not play in professional baseball from 1943 to 1945, due to World War II. He enlisted in the United States Army as a private on October 22, 1942. He served as a corporal for the 12th Armored Division, where he continued to play baseball as well as basketball. After his sports career, he worked for and retired from a brewery. Matulis was inducted to the East Chicago Athletic Hall of Fame. He died in May 2002, aged 81; a widower, he was survived by a daughter. He was of Lithuanian descent.
