= Keller-Faszholz Field =

Ballpark in Austin, Texas, US

Coordinates: 30.021472°N 91.826352°W

Keller-Faszholz Field was a ballpark located in Austin, Texas that was the home of the Concordia University Tornados baseball team through the 2008 season. The last game at the venue was played on April 19, 2008. It was named after former head coaches Jack Faszholz and James Keller. The university's main campus moved, and a new ballpark, Gardner-Boggs Field, opened in 2010. Scott Linebrink, who played at Keller-Fazholz Field and was the first Tornado to play in Major League Baseball, donated $300,000 to help build the new stadium.
