= Mike Clark (baseball) =

American baseball player (1922–1996)

- Pitcher
- Born: February 12, 1922; Camden, New Jersey, U.S.
- Died: January 25, 1996 (aged 73); Camden, New Jersey, U.S.
- Batted: Right Threw: Right

MLB debut
- July 27, 1952, for the St. Louis Cardinals

Last MLB appearance
- July 18, 1953, for the St. Louis Cardinals

MLB statistics
- Win–loss record: 3–0
- Earned run average: 5.31
- Innings pitched: 61
- Stats at Baseball Reference

Teams
- St. Louis Cardinals (1952–1953)

Michael John Clark (February 12, 1922 – January 25, 1996) was an American professional baseball player. A right-handed pitcher, Clark was 30 years old when he broke into the Major Leagues on July 27, 1952, with the St. Louis Cardinals. Although he played 17 years of professional baseball, he appeared in only two partial seasons in the Majors, working in 35 games played for the 1952–1953 Cardinals.

Clark was a native of Camden, New Jersey. He stood 6 feet 4 inches (1.93 m) tall and weighed 195 pounds (88 kg). His career began in the Cardinal farm system in 1940 and continued through 1959, interrupted by three years of service in the United States Army during World War II.

In the Majors, he appeared in 29 of his 35 games in relief, and allowed 78 hits and 35 bases on balls (with 27 strikeouts) in 61 innings pitched. He was undefeated in three decisions and recorded one save. As a minor leaguer, he compiled a 163–146 win-loss record in 556 games, including an 18-win 1949 season for the Columbus Cardinals of the Class A Sally League.
