= Keith Frazier (baseball) =

American baseball player and manager

Keith F. Frazier (May 18, 1913 – June 17, 1992) was a minor league baseball player and manager who is notable for leading the St. Joseph Saints to a league championship in 1940. He was born in Colorado, United States. Used as both an outfielder and a pitcher, Frazier played from 1933 to 1941 as well as in 1945. He hit around .282 in his career, with a career-high of .343 with the Saints in 1940. That year, he also hit 28 doubles and 13 triples, also career highs. As a pitcher, he went 42–75 in 214 games.

Frazier also fought during World War II while serving in the Navy.

== Manager career ==
Frazier managed for two seasons. In 1940, as mentioned, he managed the St. Joseph Saints to a league championship. In 1941, he managed the Stockton Fliers, leading them to the playoffs. However, they lost in the first round.
