= Willard Schmidt =

American baseball player (1928–2007)

- Pitcher
- Born: May 29, 1928; Hays, Kansas, U.S.
- Died: March 22, 2007 (aged 78); Newcastle, Oklahoma, U.S.
- Batted: Right Threw: Right

MLB debut
- April 19, 1952, for the St. Louis Cardinals

Last MLB appearance
- September 26, 1959, for the Cincinnati Reds

MLB statistics
- Win–loss record: 31–29
- Earned run average: 3.93
- Strikeouts: 323
- Stats at Baseball Reference

Teams
- St. Louis Cardinals (1952–1953, 1955–1957); Cincinnati Redlegs / Reds (1958–1959)

Willard Raymond Schmidt (May 29, 1928 – March 22, 2007) was an American professional baseball player, a pitcher who played in Major League Baseball between 1952 and 1959. Listed at 6 feet 1 inch (1.85 m), 187 pounds (85 kg), Schmidt batted and threw right-handed. He was born in Hays, Kansas. His four grandparents were Volga Germans.

He reached the majors in 1952 with the St. Louis Cardinals, spending part of six years with them (1952–53, 1955–57) before moving to the Cincinnati Redlegs (1958–59) in the same transaction that brought Curt Flood to St. Louis. His most productive season came in 1957 with the Cardinals, when he set a 10–3 mark and led the National League pitchers with a .769 W-L %. He was inducted into the Kansas Baseball Hall of Fame in 1989.

In a seven-season career, Schmidt posted a 31–29 record with 323 strikeouts and a 3.93 ERA in 194 appearances, including 55 starts, 11 complete games, one shutout, two saves, and 586 1/3 innings pitched.

== See also ==
- St. Louis Cardinals all-time roster
