= Gene Corbett =

American baseball player (1913-2009)

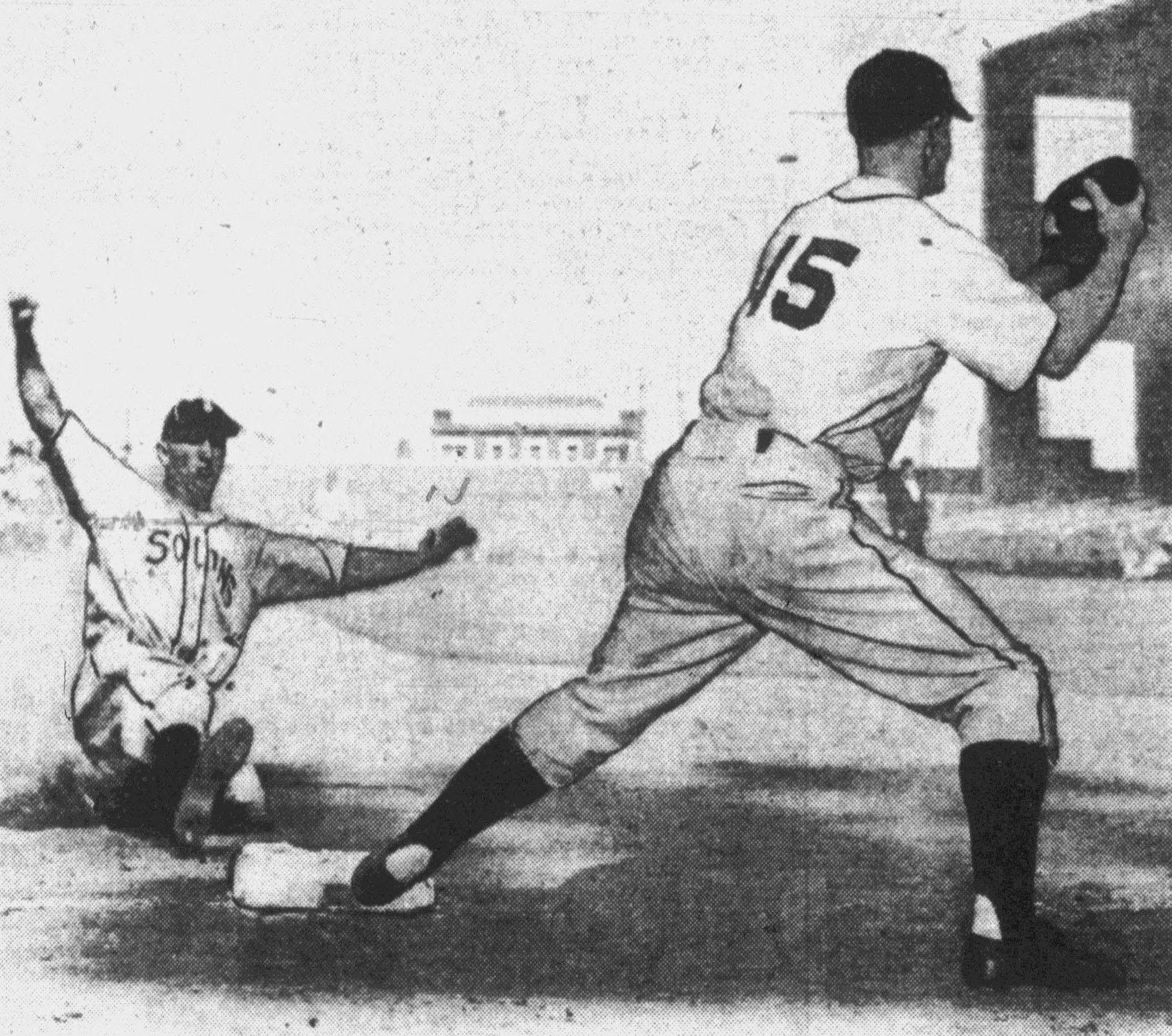
- Corbett (left) slides safely into third base as Los Angeles Angels third baseman George Archie (right) anticipates the throw.
- First baseman
- Born: October 25, 1913; Winona, Minnesota, U.S.
- Died: January 28, 2009 (aged 95); Salisbury, Maryland, U.S.
- Batted: Left Threw: Right

MLB debut
- September 19, 1936, for the Philadelphia Phillies

Last MLB appearance
- June 6, 1938, for the Philadelphia Phillies

MLB statistics
- Batting average: .120
- Home runs: 2
- Runs batted in: 10
- Stats at Baseball Reference

Teams
- Philadelphia Phillies (1936–1938)

Eugene Louis Corbett (October 25, 1913 – January 28, 2009) was an American first baseman in Major League Baseball who played for the Philadelphia Phillies between 1936 and 1938. Born in Winona, Minnesota, he batted left-handed and threw right-handed.

Corbett played with the Phillies in part of three seasons. In a 37-game career, he was a .120 hitter (13-for-108) with two home runs and 10 RBI, including 12 runs and three doubles. Following his majors career, he was traded for first baseman/outfielder Phil Weintraub and played for the Baltimore Orioles of the International League.

Corbett was the last living position player (non-pitcher) to have played at Baker Bowl, the Phillies home ballpark between May 2, 1895, and June 30, 1938, while a member of the Phillies.
