= Les Fusselman =

American baseball player (1921–1970)

- Catcher
- Born: March 7, 1921; Pryor, Oklahoma, U.S.
- Died: May 21, 1970 (aged 49); Cleveland, Ohio, U.S.
- Batted: Right Threw: Right

MLB debut
- April 16, 1952, for the St. Louis Cardinals

Last MLB appearance
- June 12, 1953, for the St. Louis Cardinals

MLB statistics
- Batting average: .169
- Home runs: 1
- Runs batted in: 3
- Stats at Baseball Reference

Teams
- St. Louis Cardinals (1952–1953)

Lester Leroy Fusselman (March 7, 1921 – May 21, 1970) was an American professional baseball player, a catcher who appeared in 43 Major League games for the 1952–1953 St. Louis Cardinals. He threw and batted right-handed, stood 6 feet 1 inch (1.85 m) tall and weighed 195 pounds (88 kg).

Born in Pryor, Oklahoma, Fusselman graduated from Payson-Seymour High School in Illinois and attended Western Illinois University. His decade-long professional career, which began in the Cardinal farm system in 1942, was interrupted by three years of service in the United States Army during World War II. Fusselman's postwar baseball career was spent bouncing between upper-level Redbird affiliates until, at age 31, he made the Cardinal roster in 1952 as a rookie. He appeared in 32 games that season as the backup catcher to Del Rice, who started 137 out of the Cards' 154 games. Fusselman himself batted 63 times and made ten hits. On May 9, 1952 he went two for four with a home run and two runs scored off Ken Raffensberger of the Cincinnati Reds.

As a minor leaguer, Fusselman batted .274 with 717 hits in 823 games played. His playing career ended after the 1954 season.
