= Leon Brinkopf =

American baseball player (1926–1998)

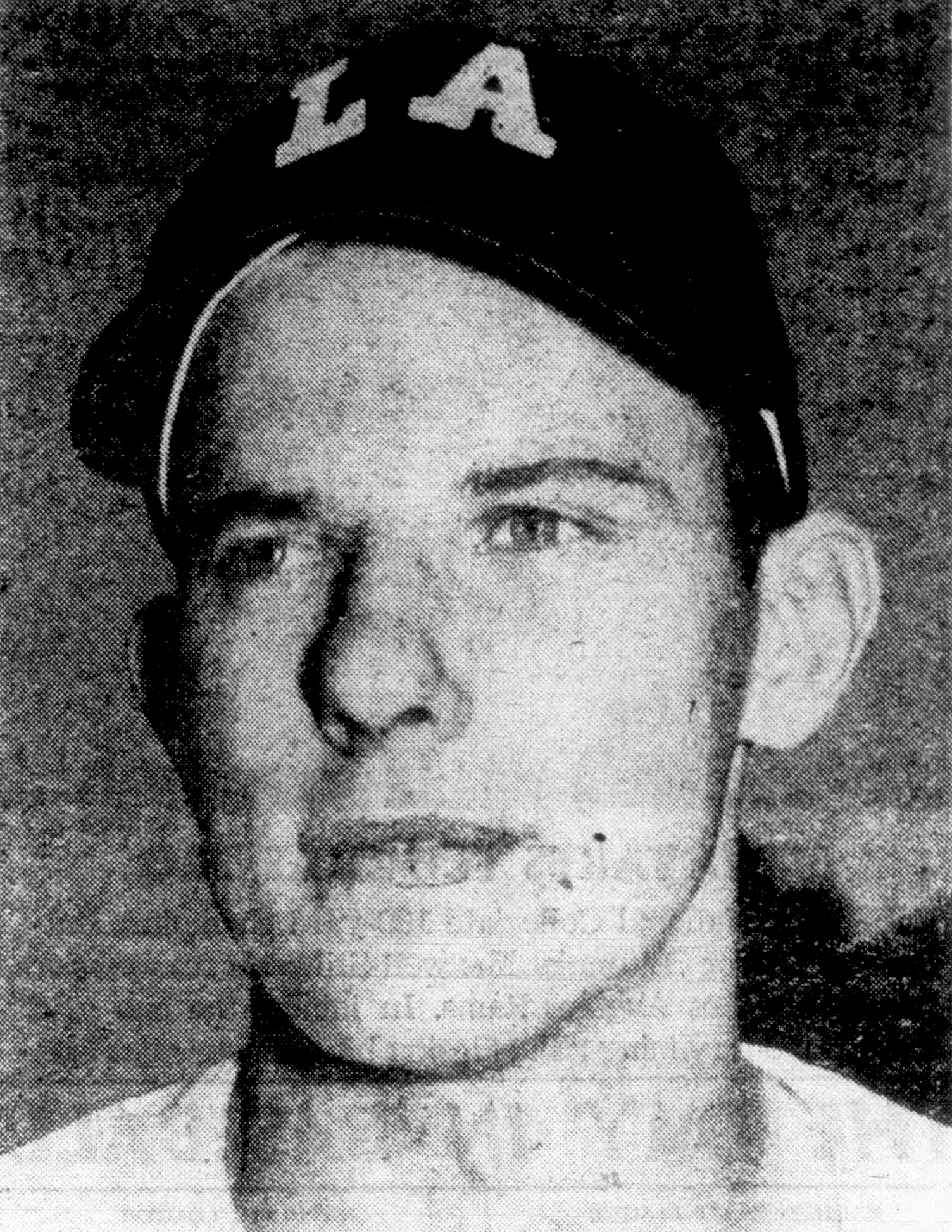
- Brinkopf in 1950
- Shortstop
- Born: October 20, 1926; Cape Girardeau, Missouri, U.S.
- Died: July 2, 1998 (aged 71); Cape Girardeau, Missouri, U.S.
- Batted: Right Threw: Right

MLB debut
- April 18, 1952, for the Chicago Cubs

Last MLB appearance
- May 5, 1952, for the Chicago Cubs

MLB statistics
- Batting average: .182
- Home runs: 0
- Runs batted in: 2
- Stats at Baseball Reference

Teams
- Chicago Cubs (1952)

Leon Clarence Brinkopf (October 20, 1926 – July 2, 1998) was an American right-handed shortstop in Major League Baseball for the Chicago Cubs in 1952.

Brinkopf was originally signed by the St. Louis Browns in 1944 but found himself released a year later. He made his way to the Chicago Cubs' farm system after they acquired him from his independent minor league team in Dallas, Texas, in exchange for former Cub big-leaguer Roy Easterwood. Brinkopf debuted with the Cubs on April 18, 1952, and appeared in a total of nine games, including his final big-league contest on May 5. The sum of his Major League Baseball experience was four hits (all singles) in 22 at-bats (a .182 batting average), 2 RBI and a run scored.

Brinkopf died on July 2, 1998, in his birthplace of Cape Girardeau, Missouri.
