= Peanuts Lowrey =

American baseball player (1917–1986)

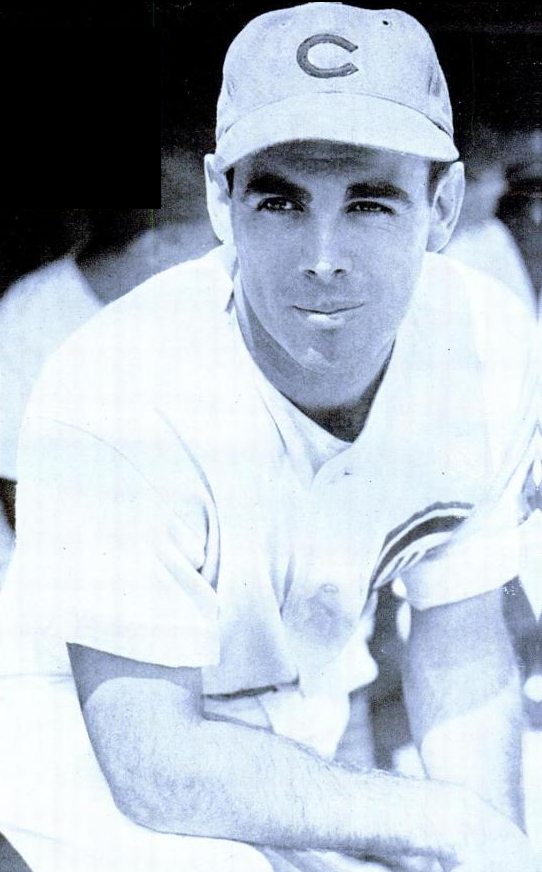
- Lowrey with the Chicago Cubs in 1948
- Outfielder
- Born: August 27, 1917; Culver City, California, U.S.
- Died: July 2, 1986 (aged 68); Inglewood, California, U.S.
- Batted: Right Threw: Right

MLB debut
- April 14, 1942, for the Chicago Cubs

Last MLB appearance
- August 30, 1955, for the Philadelphia Phillies

MLB statistics
- Batting average: .273
- Home runs: 37
- Runs batted in: 479
- Stats at Baseball Reference

Teams
- Chicago Cubs (1942–1943, 1945–1949); Cincinnati Reds (1949–1950); St. Louis Cardinals (1950–1954); Philadelphia Phillies (1955); As coach: Philadelphia Phillies (1960–1966); San Francisco Giants (1967–1968); Montreal Expos (1969); Chicago Cubs (1970–1971); California Angels (1972); Chicago Cubs (1977–1981)

Career highlights and awards
- All-Star (1946)

Harry Lee "Peanuts" Lowrey (August 27, 1917 – July 2, 1986) was an American outfielder in Major League Baseball who played for the Chicago Cubs (1942–43; 1945–49), Cincinnati Reds (1949–50), St. Louis Cardinals (1950–54) and Philadelphia Phillies (1955).

Lowrey was born in Culver City, California and attended Alexander Hamilton High School in Los Angeles. He was nicknamed as a child by an uncle who, remarking on Lowrey's small size, said, "Why, he's no bigger than a peanut." While Lowrey was growing up in Greater Los Angeles, he worked as a child actor on the Our Gang comedies. As a 35-year-old, he was credited for his screen role as a ballplayer, nicknamed "Peanuts," in The Winning Team, a 1952 biography of Grover Cleveland Alexander that starred Ronald Reagan in the title role.

Lowrey the ballplayer stood 5 feet, 8 1/2 inches (1.74 m) tall, weighed 170 pounds (77 kg) and threw and batted right-handed. In a 13-season career, Lowrey posted a .273 batting average with 1,177 hits, 37 home runs and 479 RBI in 1,401 games played. In his late career, he became known as one of the top pinch hitters in the Major Leagues. He set an MLB record with seven consecutive pinch hits in 1952, and the following season made 21 pinch hits to fall one shy of the then-MLB all-time record.

He missed the 1944 season while serving in the United States Army with a military police unit. Lowrey was discharged after six months and rejoined the Cubs in 1945.

Lowrey was the starting left fielder for the Cubs in all seven games of the 1945 World Series, batting .310 (9-for-29) with a double, and four runs scored; in Game 7, he was the last Cub to score a run in a World Series until Kris Bryant did so in Game 2 of the 2016 Fall Classic.

After a brief managing career in minor league baseball, Lowrey returned to the Major Leagues as a coach with the Phillies (1960–66), San Francisco Giants (1967–68), Montreal Expos (1969), Cubs (1970–71; 1977–81) and California Angels (1972).

Lowrey died on July 2, 1986 in Inglewood, California, at the age of 68 and is buried at Holy Cross Cemetery in Culver City.

Sporting positions
Preceded by Dick Carter	Philadelphia Phillies third base coach 1960–1963	Succeeded by George Myatt
Preceded by Al Vincent	Philadelphia Phillies first base coach 1964–1966	Succeeded by Don Hoak
Preceded by Franchise established	Montreal Expos third base coach 1969	Succeeded by Dick Williams
