= 1955 Philadelphia Phillies season =

1955 Philadelphia Phillies
- League: National League
- Ballpark: Connie Mack Stadium
- City: Philadelphia
- Owners: R. R. M. Carpenter Jr.
- General managers: Roy Hamey
- Managers: Mayo Smith
- Television: WPTZ; WFIL
- Radio: WIP (By Saam, Gene Kelly, Claude Haring)

The 1955 Philadelphia Phillies season was the 73rd season in the history of the franchise, and the 18th season for the Philadelphia Phillies at Connie Mack Stadium. It was the first season for Phillies' manager Mayo Smith. Prior to the season, the Phillies were seen to have strong pitching with ace Robin Roberts but did not have power hitters to match pennant favorites Brooklyn, New York, or Milwaukee, behind whom the Phillies finished in fourth place with a record of 77–77.

== Offseason ==
Prior to the 1955 season, the Phillies purchased the 50-foot-tall (15 m) Ballantine Beer electronic scoreboard from Yankee Stadium for $175,000 from the Yankees. It was placed in right-center field at Connie Mack Stadium. This scoreboard was used through the final year at the ballpark.

=== Spring training ===
In March 1955, the Phillies began spring training play at Clearwater's Jack Russell Stadium. The stadium was dedicated on March 10, 1955. Baseball Commissioner Ford Frick, National League president Warren Giles, American League president Will Harridge, Clearwater mayor Herbert M. Brown, and other city dignitaries were in attendance. The Phillies played their first game at the stadium on the day of the dedication. Robin Roberts started for the Phillies against the Detroit Tigers. The Phillies won 4–2 on a two-run double by Willie Jones before 4,209 attendees.

=== Notable transactions ===
- February 11, 1955: Peanuts Lowrey was signed as a free agent by the Phillies.
- February 19, 1955: Jimmie Coker was signed as an amateur free agent by the Phillies.
- Prior to 1955 season: Ed Bouchee was purchased by the Phillies from the Spokane Indians.

== Regular season ==
=== Season standings ===
National League
Team	W	L	Pct.	GB	Home	Road
Brooklyn Dodgers	98	55	.641	—	56‍–‍21	42‍–‍34
Milwaukee Braves	85	69	.552	13½	46‍–‍31	39‍–‍38
New York Giants	80	74	.519	18½	44‍–‍35	36‍–‍39
Philadelphia Phillies	77	77	.500	21½	46‍–‍31	31‍–‍46
Cincinnati Redlegs	75	79	.487	23½	46‍–‍31	29‍–‍48
Chicago Cubs	72	81	.471	26	43‍–‍33	29‍–‍48
St. Louis Cardinals	68	86	.442	30½	41‍–‍36	27‍–‍50
Pittsburgh Pirates	60	94	.390	38½	36‍–‍39	24‍–‍55

=== Record vs. opponents ===
1955 National League record Sources:
Team	BRO	CHC	CIN	MIL	NYG	PHI	PIT	STL
Brooklyn	—	14–7–1	12–10	15–7	13–9	16–6	14–8	14–8
Chicago	7–14–1	—	11–11	7–15	12–10	10–12	11–11	14–8
Cincinnati	10–12	11–11	—	9–13	9–13	11–11	14–8	11–11
Milwaukee	7–15	15–7	13–9	—	14–8	14–8	11–11	11–11
New York	9–13	10–12	13–9	8–14	—	10–12	17–5	13–9
Philadelphia	6–16	12–10	11–11	8–14	12–10	—	15–7	13–9
Pittsburgh	8–14	11–11	8–14	11–11	5–17	7–15	—	10–12
St. Louis	8–14	8–14	11–11	11–11	9–13	9–13	12–10	—

=== Notable transactions ===
- April 30, 1955: Smoky Burgess, Stan Palys and Steve Ridzik were traded by the Phillies to the Cincinnati Redlegs for Andy Seminick, Glen Gorbous, and Jim Greengrass.

=== Game log ===
Legend
	Phillies win
	Phillies loss
	Postponement
**Bold**	Phillies team member

1955 Game Log
Overall Record: 77–77
April (9–7)

#	Date	Opponent	Score	Win	Loss	Save	Attendance	Record
–	April 12	Giants	Postponed (rain); Makeup: May 25 as a traditional double-header					
1	April 13	Giants	4–2	**Robin Roberts** (1–0)	Johnny Antonelli (0–1)	None	13,219	1–0
2	April 14	@ Pirates	4–3	**Herm Wehmeier** (1–0)	Dick Littlefield (0–1)	None	23,540	2–0
–	April 15	@ Pirates	Postponed (rain, wet grounds); Makeup: May 29 as a traditional double-header					
3	April 16	@ Giants	3–8	Jim Hearn (1–0)	**Jack Meyer** (0–1)	None	11,163	2–1
4	April 17 (1)	@ Giants	4–2 (11)	**Robin Roberts** (2–0)	Johnny Antonelli (0–2)	None	see 2nd game	3–1
5	April 17 (2)	@ Giants	4–2	**Murry Dickson** (1–0)	Sal Maglie (0–2)	None	16,166	4–1
6	April 18	Dodgers	2–5	Carl Erskine (2–0)	**Herm Wehmeier** (1–1)	Ed Roebuck (1)	30,896	4–2
7	April 19	Dodgers	6–7	Don Newcombe (2–0)	**Jim Owens** (0–1)	Ed Roebuck (2)	19,930	4–3
8	April 20	@ Dodgers	2–3	Billy Loes (2–0)	**Steve Ridzik** (0–1)	Clem Labine (1)	9,942	4–4
9	April 21	@ Dodgers	4–14	Joe Black (1–0)	**Robin Roberts** (2–1)	None	3,874	4–5
10	April 22	Pirates	5–4	**Bob Miller** (1–0)	Roger Bowman (0–1)	None	5,821	5–5
11	April 23	Pirates	8–0	**Murry Dickson** (2–0)	Ron Kline (0–2)	None	4,132	6–5
12	April 24 (1)	Pirates	1–6	Max Surkont (1–2)	**Jim Owens** (0–2)	None	see 2nd game	6–6
13	April 24 (2)	Pirates	3–0^{^{[a]}}	**Jack Meyer** (1–1)	Nellie King (0–1)	**Robin Roberts** (1)	8,224	7–6
–	April 26	Cardinals	Postponed (wet grounds); Makeup: July 22 as a traditional double-header					
14	April 28	Braves	3–2	**Robin Roberts** (3–1)	Lew Burdette (2–1)	None	12,963	8–6
15	April 29	Braves	13–4 (8)	**Herm Wehmeier** (2–1)	Warren Spahn (2–2)	None	12,146	9–6
16	April 30	Braves	2–4	Chet Nichols (2–0)	**Murry Dickson** (2–1)	Humberto Robinson (2)	7,739	9–7

May (10–19)

#	Date	Opponent	Score	Win	Loss	Save	Attendance	Record
17	May 1 (1)	Cubs	7–8	Hal Jeffcoat (2–0)	**Lynn Lovenguth** (0–1)	Bubba Church (1)	see 2nd game	9–8
18	May 1 (2)	Cubs	2–4^{^{[b]}}	Hal Jeffcoat (3–0)	**Jack Meyer** (1–2)	Warren Hacker (1)	13,917	9–9
19	May 2	Cubs	1–2	Warren Hacker (1–1)	**Robin Roberts** (3–2)	None	7,964	9–10
20	May 3	Redlegs	5–7	Bud Podbielan (1–0)	**Jack Spring** (0–1)	None	6,029	9–11
21	May 4	Redlegs	3–7	Gerry Staley (3–2)	**Ron Mrozinski** (0–1)	Art Fowler (1)	5,531	9–12
22	May 6	Dodgers	4–6 (12)	Don Newcombe (3–0)	**Jack Meyer** (1–3)	None	22,420	9–13
23	May 7	Dodgers	3–6	Carl Erskine (5–0)	**Robin Roberts** (3–3)	None	27,922	9–14
24	May 8	Dodgers	8–9	Johnny Podres (3–1)	**Herm Wehmeier** (2–2)	Jim Hughes (4)	13,738	9–15
25	May 10	@ Cardinals	3–5 (10)	Luis Arroyo (2–0)	**Jack Meyer** (1–4)	None	4,693	9–16
26	May 11	@ Cardinals	5–6	Herb Moford (1–0)	**Ron Mrozinski** (0–2)	Barney Schultz (1)	4,726	9–17
–	May 12	@ Redlegs	Postponed (rain); Makeup: June 24 as a traditional double-header					
–	May 13	@ Redlegs	Postponed (rain, threatening weather, wet grounds); Makeup: August 2 as a traditional double-header					
27	May 14	@ Braves	4–5	Ernie Johnson (1–1)	**Jack Meyer** (1–5)	None	24,862	9–18
28	May 15 (1)	@ Braves	5–6	Dave Jolly (1–2)	**Thornton Kipper** (0–1)	None	see 2nd game	9–19
29	May 15 (2)	@ Braves	9–1	**Robin Roberts** (4–3)	Chet Nichols (3–1)	None	42,351	10–19
–	May 17	@ Cubs	Postponed (cold); Makeup: May 18 as a traditional double-header					
30	May 18 (1)	@ Cubs	2–3	Sam Jones (5–3)	**Curt Simmons** (0–1)	Hal Jeffcoat (2)	see 2nd game	10–20
31	May 18 (2)	@ Cubs	5–7	Hal Jeffcoat (4–0)	**Murry Dickson** (2–2)	None	9,329	10–21
32	May 20	@ Dodgers	5–3	**Robin Roberts** (5–3)	Billy Loes (4–2)	None	21,355	11–21
33	May 21	@ Dodgers	4–6	Don Newcombe (6–0)	**Dave Cole** (0–1)	Ed Roebuck (4)	13,401	11–22
34	May 22	@ Dodgers	3–8	Carl Erskine (6–1)	**Jack Meyer** (1–6)	Ed Roebuck (5)	15,459	11–23
35	May 24	Giants	6–2	**Curt Simmons** (1–1)	Jim Hearn (6–3)	**Jack Meyer** (1)	15,008	12–23
36	May 25 (1)	Giants	8–3	**Robin Roberts** (6–3)	Windy McCall (1–1)	None	see 2nd game	13–23
37	May 25 (2)	Giants	5–2	**Murry Dickson** (3–2)	Johnny Antonelli (4–5)	**Jack Meyer** (2)	27,420	14–23
38	May 26	Giants	3–2 (11)	**Bob Miller** (2–0)	Hoyt Wilhelm (2–1)	None	11,743	15–23
39	May 27	@ Pirates	5–2 (10)	**Herm Wehmeier** (3–2)	Bob Friend (2–1)	None	6,956	16–23
40	May 28	@ Pirates	8–4 (11)	**Bob Miller** (3–0)	Roy Face (0–1)	**Jack Meyer** (3)	3,082	17–23
41	May 29 (1)	@ Pirates	5–2	**Robin Roberts** (7–3)	Laurin Pepper (0–1)	None	see 2nd game	18–23
42	May 29 (2)	@ Pirates	5–11^{^{[c]}}	Max Surkont (4–5)	**Dave Cole** (0–2)	None	5,918	18–24
43	May 30 (1)	@ Giants	5–6	Marv Grissom (2–0)	**Curt Simmons** (1–2)	Windy McCall (1)	see 2nd game	18–25
44	May 30 (2)	@ Giants	3–1	**Bob Kuzava** (1–1)	Don Liddle (1–2)	**Jack Meyer** (4)	20,044	19–25
45	May 31	@ Giants	1–2	Sal Maglie (6–3)	**Herm Wehmeier** (3–3)	None	6,746	19–26

June (13–14)

#	Date	Opponent	Score	Win	Loss	Save	Attendance	Record
46	June 1	Cubs	3–1	**Robin Roberts** (8–3)	Sam Jones (5–6)	None	19,974	20–26
47	June 2	Cubs	8–4	**Curt Simmons** (2–2)	Warren Hacker (4–3)	**Bob Miller** (1)	6,084	21–26
48	June 3	Braves	3–4 (10)	Lew Burdette (3–4)	**Murry Dickson** (3–3)	None	16,362	21–27
49	June 4	Braves	3–11	Warren Spahn (4–6)	**Bob Miller** (3–1)	None	6,465	21–28
50	June 5 (1)	Braves	4–5	Ernie Johnson (2–2)	**Robin Roberts** (8–4)	None	see 2nd game	21–29
51	June 5 (2)	Braves	4–2^{^{[d]}}	**Herm Wehmeier** (4–3)	Gene Conley (7–3)	**Jack Meyer** (5)	23,431	22–29
52	June 6	Braves	2–5	Bob Buhl (2–4)	**Dave Cole** (0–3)	None	11,815	22–30
53	June 7	Cardinals	4–5	Harvey Haddix (3–8)	**Murry Dickson** (3–4)	Frank Smith (1)	9,782	22–31
–	June 8	Cardinals	Postponed (rain); Makeup: August 25 as a traditional double-header					
54	June 9	Cardinals	2–0	**Robin Roberts** (9–4)	Larry Jackson (2–3)	None	5,668	23–31
–	June 11	Redlegs	Postponed (rain); Makeup: July 19 as a traditional double-header					
55	June 12 (1)	Redlegs	12–8	**Curt Simmons** (3–2)	Joe Nuxhall (5–4)	None	13,067	24–31
–	June 12 (2)	Redlegs	Postponed (rain); Makeup: July 20 as a traditional double-header					
56	June 14	@ Braves	2–4	Lew Burdette (4–4)	**Robin Roberts** (9–5)	None	29,252	24–32
57	June 15	@ Braves	4–0	**Herm Wehmeier** (5–3)	Gene Conley (8–4)	None	27,759	25–32
58	June 16	@ Braves	3–0	**Murry Dickson** (4–4)	Bob Buhl (3–5)	None	17,978	26–32
59	June 17	@ Cubs	3–2	**Curt Simmons** (4–2)	Bob Rush (4–4)	None	6,575	27–32
60	June 18	@ Cubs	0–4	Sam Jones (7–8)	**Robin Roberts** (9–6)	None	16,543	27–33
61	June 19 (1)	@ Cubs	1–0 (15)	**Jack Meyer** (2–6)	Hal Jeffcoat (6–1)	None	see 2nd game	28–33
62	June 19 (2)	@ Cubs	7–8 (7)	Howie Pollet (3–0)	**Herm Wehmeier** (5–4)	Warren Hacker (2)	34,529	28–34
63	June 20	@ Cardinals	1–4	Luis Arroyo (8–2)	**Murry Dickson** (4–5)	None	7,284	28–35
64	June 21	@ Cardinals	10–8	**Murry Dickson** (5–5)	Paul LaPalme (3–1)	**Ron Mrozinski** (1)	7,717	29–35
65	June 22	@ Cardinals	9–6	**Robin Roberts** (10–6)	Bobby Tiefenauer (1–4)	None	7,445	30–35
66	June 23	@ Cardinals	1–7	Floyd Wooldridge (1–1)	**Herm Wehmeier** (5–5)	None	6,430	30–36
67	June 24 (1)	@ Redlegs	8–6	**Ron Negray** (1–0)	Rudy Minarcin (4–3)	**Jack Meyer** (6)	see 2nd game	31–36
68	June 24 (2)	@ Redlegs	0–6	Joe Nuxhall (7–4)	**Murry Dickson** (5–6)	None	18,326	31–37
–	June 25	@ Redlegs	Postponed (rain); Makeup: August 1					
69	June 26 (1)	@ Redlegs	5–16	Jackie Collum (6–2)	**Robin Roberts** (10–7)	Hersh Freeman (3)	see 2nd game	31–38
70	June 26 (2)	@ Redlegs	0–5	Art Fowler (3–4)	**Curt Simmons** (4–3)	None	16,897	31–39
71	June 28	Pirates	5–7 (10)	Bob Friend (5–4)	**Jack Meyer** (2–7)	Roy Face (3)	8,635	31–40
72	June 29	Pirates	6–3	**Ron Negray** (2–0)	Dick Littlefield (2–6)	None	4,919	32–40

July (21–14)

#	Date	Opponent	Score	Win	Loss	Save	Attendance	Record
73	July 1	Giants	9–3	**Robin Roberts** (11–7)	Johnny Antonelli (6–10)	None	14,135	33–40
74	July 2	Giants	1–6	Sal Maglie (9–4)	**Curt Simmons** (4–4)	Don Liddle (1)	6,542	33–41
75	July 3	Giants	3–4	Rubén Gómez (6–3)	**Bob Miller** (3–2)	None	8,259	33–42
76	July 4 (1)	Dodgers	2–11	Don Newcombe (14–1)	**Ron Negray** (2–1)	None	see 2nd game	33–43
77	July 4 (2)	Dodgers	3–6	Clem Labine (7–2)	**Herm Wehmeier** (5–6)	None	33,707	33–44
78	July 5	Dodgers	5–4	**Robin Roberts** (12–7)	Karl Spooner (2–2)	**Jack Meyer** (7)	21,041	34–44
79	July 6	@ Giants	2–4 (6)	Ramón Monzant (1–4)	**Curt Simmons** (4–5)	None	8,845	34–45
80	July 7	@ Giants	5–8	Windy McCall (3–3)	**Jack Meyer** (2–8)	Marv Grissom (7)	5,130	34–46
81	July 8	@ Pirates	5–1	**Herm Wehmeier** (6–6)	Max Surkont (7–9)	None	7,304	35–46
82	July 9	@ Pirates	7–1	**Robin Roberts** (13–7)	Dick Littlefield (2–7)	None	2,637	36–46
83	July 10 (1)	@ Pirates	4–1	**Curt Simmons** (5–5)	Bob Friend (5–5)	None	see 2nd game	37–46
84	July 10 (2)	@ Pirates	1–3	Vern Law (6–3)	**Ron Negray** (2–2)	None	6,454	37–47
–	July 12	**1955 Major League Baseball All-Star Game at Milwaukee County Stadium in Milwaukee**						
85	July 14	Braves	1–7	Bob Buhl (7–7)	**Herm Wehmeier** (6–7)	None	16,728	37–48
86	July 15	Braves	1–0	**Murry Dickson** (6–6)	Lew Burdette (7–5)	None	11,794	38–48
87	July 16	Cubs	39–48	**Robin Roberts** (14–7)	Warren Hacker (9–7)	None	5,241	39–48
88	July 17 (1)	Cubs	12–11 (10)	**Jack Meyer** (3–8)	Sam Jones (9–12)	None	see 2nd game	40–48
89	July 17 (2)	Cubs	8–6^{^{[e]}}	**Ron Negray** (3–2)	Hal Jeffcoat (6–4)	**Jack Meyer** (8)	8,513	41–48
90	July 18	Cubs	2–1	**Herm Wehmeier** (7–7)	Warren Hacker (9–8)	None	8,192	42–48
91	July 19 (1)	Redlegs	7–3	**Murry Dickson** (7–6)	Joe Nuxhall (9–7)	None	see 2nd game	43–48
92	July 19 (2)	Redlegs	6–2	**Robin Roberts** (15–7)	Jackie Collum (8–4)	None	16,960	44–48
93	July 20 (1)	Redlegs	6–0	**Saul Rogovin** (2–8)	Art Fowler (4–6)	None	see 2nd game	45–48
94	July 20 (2)	Redlegs	4–2	**Curt Simmons** (6–5)	Johnny Klippstein (1–6)	None	15,607	46–48
95	July 21	Redlegs	5–3	**Jack Meyer** (4–8)	Gerry Staley (5–7)	None	8,036	47–48
96	July 22 (1)	Cardinals	6–3	**Murry Dickson** (8–6)	Floyd Wooldridge (2–3)	None	see 2nd game	48–48
97	July 22 (2)	Cardinals	1–8	Harvey Haddix (8–9)	**Herm Wehmeier** (7–8)	None	27,611	48–49
98	July 23	Cardinals	7–2	**Robin Roberts** (16–7)	Willard Schmidt (1–1)	None	5,596	49–49
99	July 24 (1)	Cardinals	6–5	**Curt Simmons** (7–5)	Larry Jackson (5–7)	**Jack Meyer** (9)	see 2nd game	50–49
100	July 24 (2)	Cardinals	3–0 (6)	**Saul Rogovin** (3–8)	Tom Poholsky (4–5)	None	13,524	51–49
101	July 26	@ Braves	3–6	Warren Spahn (9–10)	**Herm Wehmeier** (7–9)	None	29,534	51–50
102	July 27	@ Braves	1–2	Lew Burdette (8–5)	**Robin Roberts** (16–8)	Ernie Johnson (2)	25,936	51–51
103	July 28	@ Braves	2–4	Bob Buhl (8–7)	**Murry Dickson** (8–7)	None	22,335	51–52
104	July 29	@ Cubs	6–4	**Jack Meyer** (5–8)	Sam Jones (9–15)	**Robin Roberts** (2)	4,271	52–52
105	July 30	@ Cubs	3–0	**Bob Miller** (4–2)	Jim Davis (5–6)	None	8,405	53–52
106	July 31 (1)	@ Cubs	1–7	Warren Hacker (10–9)	**Robin Roberts** (16–9)	None	see 2nd game	53–53
107	July 31 (2)	@ Cubs	5–6	Hal Jeffcoat (7–5)	**Jack Meyer** (5–9)	None	14,469	53–54

August (17–10)

#	Date	Opponent	Score	Win	Loss	Save	Attendance	Record
108	August 1	@ Redlegs	3–4	Art Fowler (6–7)	**Murry Dickson** (8–8)	Hersh Freeman (7)	3,481	53–55
109	August 2 (1)	@ Redlegs	0–2	Johnny Klippstein (3–6)	**Ron Negray** (3–3)	None	see 2nd game	53–56
110	August 2 (2)	@ Redlegs	0–4	Joe Nuxhall (11–8)	**Saul Rogovin** (3–9)	None	10,611	53–57
111	August 3	@ Redlegs	8–4	**Robin Roberts** (17–9)	Jackie Collum (9–6)	None	7,718	54–57
112	August 4	@ Redlegs	3–4	Rudy Minarcin (5–9)	**Jack Meyer** (5–10)	Joe Nuxhall (2)	2,793	54–58
113	August 5	@ Cardinals	7–4	**Bob Miller** (5–2)	Larry Jackson (5–9)	**Jack Meyer** (10)	8,455	55–58
114	August 6	@ Cardinals	5–3	**Murry Dickson** (9–8)	Harvey Haddix (9–11)	None	9,414	56–58
115	August 7	@ Cardinals	9–6	**Robin Roberts** (18–9)	Mel Wright (1–1)	**Jack Meyer** (11)	7,917	57–58
116	August 9	Pirates	9–1	**Herm Wehmeier** (8–9)	Dick Hall (3–2)	None	9,347	58–58
117	August 10	Pirates	2–3 (10)	Bob Friend (9–6)	**Bob Miller** (5–3)	None	3,922	58–59
–	August 12	@ Dodgers	Postponed (rain; Hurricane Connie); Makeup: August 14 as a traditional double-header					
–	August 13	@ Dodgers	Postponed (rain; Hurricane Connie); Makeup: September 20 as a traditional double-header					
118	August 14 (1)	@ Dodgers	3–2 (10)	**Robin Roberts** (19–9)	Don Newcombe (18–3)	None	see 2nd game	59–59
119	August 14 (2)	@ Dodgers	4–5 (13)	Karl Spooner (5–4)	**Bob Miller** (5–4)	None	21,344	59–60
120	August 16	@ Pirates	12–3	**Herm Wehmeier** (9–9)	Bob Friend (9–7)	None	6,290	60–60
121	August 17	@ Pirates	4–6	Roy Face (3–5)	**Curt Simmons** (7–6)	None	3,721	60–61
122	August 19	Dodgers	3–2	**Robin Roberts** (20–9)	Don Newcombe (18–4)	None	35,444	61–61
123	August 20	Dodgers	3–2	**Bob Miller** (6–4)	Johnny Podres (8–8)	**Robin Roberts** (3)	25,390	62–61
124	August 21	Dodgers	6–4	**Herm Wehmeier** (10–9)	Carl Erskine (10–5)	**Jack Meyer** (12)	17,492	63–61
125	August 23	Braves	4–3	**Jack Meyer** (6–10)	Lew Burdette (9–7)	None	23,991	64–61
126	August 25 (1)	Cardinals	11–9	**Robin Roberts** (21–9)	Paul LaPalme (4–3)	**Jack Meyer** (13)	see 2nd game	65–61
127	August 25 (2)	Cardinals	8–3	**Saul Rogovin** (4–9)	Harvey Haddix (11–13)	None	38,545	66–61
128	August 26	Cardinals	1–4	Willard Schmidt (4–3)	**Curt Simmons** (7–7)	None	11,387	66–62
129	August 27	Cardinals	8–2	**Murry Dickson** (10–8)	Luis Arroyo (11–8)	None	6,822	67–62
130	August 28 (1)	Redlegs	7–6	**Bob Miller** (7–4)	Joe Nuxhall (14–10)	**Jack Meyer** (14)	see 2nd game	68–62
131	August 28 (2)	Redlegs	8–3	**Ron Negray** (4–3)	Jackie Collum (9–8)	None	19,067	69–62
132	August 29	Redlegs	3–4	Hersh Freeman (6–3)	**Robin Roberts** (21–10)	None	17,134	69–63
133	August 30	Cubs	1–3	Sam Jones (12–17)	**Saul Rogovin** (4–10)	Hal Jeffcoat (6)	9,790	69–64
134	August 31	Cubs	13–2	**Murry Dickson** (11–8)	Jim Davis (6–10)	None	8,018	70–64

September (7–13)

#	Date	Opponent	Score	Win	Loss	Save	Attendance	Record
135	September 2	Giants	5–3	**Robin Roberts** (22–10)	Windy McCall (5–5)	**Jack Meyer** (15)	19,997	71–64
136	September 3	Giants	2–3	Ramón Monzant (3–7)	**Herm Wehmeier** (10–10)	None	23,179	71–65
137	September 4	Giants	4–7	Hoyt Wilhelm (3–1)	**Jack Meyer** (6–11)	Marv Grissom (8)	16,197	71–66
138	September 5 (1)	@ Dodgers	4–11	Don Newcombe (20–4)	**Murry Dickson** (11–9)	None	see 2nd game	71–67
139	September 5 (2)	@ Dodgers	2–8	Carl Erskine (11–7)	**Robin Roberts** (22–11)	None	33,451	71–68
140	September 7	@ Redlegs	3–6	Johnny Klippstein (7–9)	**Curt Simmons** (7–8)	None	6,888	71–69
141	September 8	@ Redlegs	6–4	**Bob Miller** (8–4)	Don Gross (3–5)	None	1,531	72–69
142	September 9	@ Cardinals	2–11	Willard Schmidt (5–5)	**Murry Dickson** (11–10)	None	5,932	72–70
143	September 10	@ Cardinals	3–4 (6)	Tom Poholsky (8–10)	**Robin Roberts** (22–12)	None	4,471	72–71
144	September 11 (1)	@ Braves	4–5	Ernie Johnson (5–6)	**Herm Wehmeier** (10–11)	None	see 2nd game	72–72
145	September 11 (2)	@ Braves	1–9	Humberto Robinson (3–0)	**Saul Rogovin** (4–11)	None	26,426	72–73
146	September 13	@ Cubs	10–0	**Murry Dickson** (12–10)	Sam Jones (13–19)	None	1,785	73–73
147	September 16	Pirates	8–1	**Robin Roberts** (23–12)	Max Surkont (7–13)	None	10,023	74–73
148	September 18 (1)	Pirates	2–5	Bob Friend (13–9)	**Herm Wehmeier** (10–12)	Roy Face (5)	see 2nd game	74–74
149	September 18 (2)	Pirates	2–1	**Saul Rogovin** (5–11)	Dick Hall (5–6)	None	12,683	75–74
150	September 20 (1)	@ Dodgers	3–6	Clem Labine (13–5)	**Murry Dickson** (12–11)	Don Bessent (3)	see 2nd game	75–75
151	September 20 (2)	@ Dodgers	1–6	Roger Craig (5–3)	**Robin Roberts** (23–13)	None	8,763	75–76
152	September 23	@ Giants	5–1	**Saul Rogovin** (6–11)	Rubén Gómez (9–10)	None	1,154	76–76
–	September 24	@ Giants	Postponed (rain); Makeup: September 25 as a traditional double-header					
153	September 25 (1)	@ Giants	2–5	Pete Burnside (1–0)	**Robin Roberts** (23–14)	None	see 2nd game	76–77
154	September 25 (2)	@ Giants	3–1	**Curt Simmons** (8–8)	Jim Hearn (14–16)	**Jack Meyer** (16)	6,848	77–77

^{^[a]}The second game on April 24 was suspended (Sunday curfew) in the bottom of the eighth inning with the score 2–0 and was completed June 28, 1955.
^{^[b]}The second game on May 1 was suspended (Sunday curfew) in the bottom of the ninth inning with the score 2–4 and was completed May 2, 1955.
^{^[c]}The second game on May 29 was suspended (Sunday curfew) in the bottom of the seventh inning with the score 3–8 and was completed July 8, 1955.
^{^[d]}The second game on June 5 was suspended (Sunday curfew) in the bottom of the seventh inning with the score 4–0 and was completed June 6, 1955.
^{^[e]}The second game on July 17 was suspended (Sunday curfew) in the bottom of the sixth inning with the score 4–5 and was completed July 18, 1955.

=== Roster ===
1955 Philadelphia Phillies
**Roster**
**Pitchers**: 44 Dave Cole; 20 Murry Dickson; 26 Bob Greenwood; 34 Thornton Kipper; 12 Bob Kuzava; 43 Lynn Lovenguth; 42 Jack Meyer; 19 Bob Miller; 27 Ron Mrozinski; 38 Ron Negray; 18,39 Jim Owens; 37 Steve Ridzik; 36 Robin Roberts; 5 Saul Rogovin; 28 Curt Simmons; 45 Jack Spring; 22 Herm Wehmeier	**Catchers**: 21 Smoky Burgess; 29 Stan Lopata; 25 Gus Niarhos; 21 Andy Seminick; **Infielders**: 38 Floyd Baker; 47 Marv Blaylock; 2 Granny Hamner; 6 Willie Jones; 7 Ted Kazanski; 5 Mickey Micelotta; 4 Bobby Morgan; 17 Roy Smalley Jr.; 9 Earl Torgeson; 44 Eddie Waitkus	**Outfielders**: 1 Richie Ashburn; 8 Bob Bowman; 16 Mel Clark; 14 Del Ennis; 37 Glen Gorbous; 10 Jim Greengrass; 3 Peanuts Lowrey; 15 Stan Palys; **Other batters**: 18 Jim Command; 9 John Easton; 10 Danny Schell; 45 Fred Van Dusen; 48 Jim Westlake	**Manager**: 24 Mayo Smith; **Coaches**: 11 Benny Bengough; 40 Maje McDonnell; 32 Wally Moses; 31 Whit Wyatt

== Player stats ==
=== Batting ===
==== Starters by position ====
Note: Pos = Position; G = Games played; AB = At bats; H = Hits; Avg. = Batting average; HR = Home runs; RBI = Runs batted in

Pos	Player	G	AB	H	Avg.	HR	RBI
C	Andy Seminick	93	289	71	.246	11	34
1B	Marv Blaylock	113	259	54	.208	3	24
2B	Bobby Morgan	136	483	112	.232	10	49
3B	Willie Jones	146	516	133	.258	16	81
SS	Roy Smalley Jr.	92	260	51	.196	7	39
LF	Del Ennis	146	564	167	.296	29	120
CF	Richie Ashburn	140	533	180	.338	3	42
RF	Jim Greengrass	94	323	88	.272	12	37

==== Other batters ====
Note: G = Games played; AB = At bats; H = Hits; Avg. = Batting average; HR = Home runs; RBI = Runs batted in

Player	G	AB	H	Avg.	HR	RBI
Granny Hamner	104	405	104	.257	5	43
Stan Lopata	99	303	82	.271	22	58
Glen Gorbous	91	224	53	.237	4	23
Earl Torgeson	47	150	40	.267	1	17
Eddie Waitkus	33	107	30	.280	2	14
Peanuts Lowrey	54	106	20	.189	0	8
Stan Palys	15	52	15	.288	1	8
Mel Clark	10	32	5	.156	0	1
Smoky Burgess	7	21	4	.190	1	1
Ted Kazanski	9	12	1	.083	1	1
Gus Niarhos	7	9	1	.111	0	0
Floyd Baker	5	8	0	.000	0	0
Jim Command	5	5	0	.000	0	0
Mickey Micelotta	4	4	0	.000	0	0
Bob Bowman	3	3	0	.000	0	0
Danny Schell	2	2	0	.000	0	0
Jim Westlake	1	1	0	.000	0	0
Fred Van Dusen	1	0	0	----	0	0
John Easton	1	0	0	----	0	0

=== Pitching ===
==== Starting pitchers ====
Note: G = Games pitched; IP = Innings pitched; W = Wins; L = Losses; ERA = Earned run average; SO = Strikeouts

Player	G	IP	W	L	ERA	SO
Robin Roberts	40	305.0	23	14	3.28	160
Murry Dickson	36	216.0	12	11	3.50	92
Herm Wehmeier	31	193.2	10	12	4.41	85
Curt Simmons	25	130.0	8	8	4.92	58
Saul Rogovin	12	73.0	5	3	3.08	27

==== Other pitchers ====
Note: G = Games pitched; IP = Innings pitched; W = Wins; L = Losses; ERA = Earned run average; SO = Strikeouts

Player	G	IP	W	L	ERA	SO
Ron Negray	19	71.2	4	3	3.52	30
Bob Kuzava	17	32.1	1	0	7.24	13
Dave Cole	7	18.1	0	3	6.38	6
Steve Ridzik	3	11.0	0	1	2.45	6
Jim Owens	3	8.2	0	2	8.31	6

==== Relief pitchers ====
Note: G = Games pitched; W = Wins; L = Losses; SV = Saves; ERA = Earned run average; SO = Strikeouts

Player	G	W	L	SV	ERA	SO
Jack Meyer	50	6	11	16	3.43	97
Bob Miller	40	8	4	1	2.41	28
Thornton Kipper	24	0	1	0	4.99	15
Ron Mrozinski	22	0	2	1	6.55	18
Lynn Lovenguth	14	0	1	0	4.50	14
Jack Spring	2	0	1	0	6.75	2
Bob Greenwood	1	0	0	0	15.43	0

== Awards and honors ==
All-Star Game

- Del Ennis, starter, outfield
- Robin Roberts, starter, pitcher
- Stan Lopata, reserve

== Farm system ==
Level	Team	League	Manager
AAA	Syracuse Chiefs	International League	Skeeter Newsome
A	Schenectady Blue Jays	Eastern League	Don Osborn
B	Reidsville Phillies	Carolina League	Charlie Gassaway
C	Salt Lake City Bees	Pioneer League	Don Sturgeon and Red Jessen
C	Trois-Rivières Phillies	Provincial League	Al Barillari
D	Pulaski Phillies	Appalachian League	Eddie Murphy
D	Mattoon Phillies	Mississippi–Ohio Valley League	Burl Storie
D	Bradford Phillies	PONY League	Lew Krausse, Sr., and Patrick Colgan
