= 1955 Brooklyn Dodgers season =

Major League Baseball season

1955 Brooklyn Dodgers
- World Series champions National League champions
- League: National League
- Ballpark: Ebbets Field
- City: Brooklyn, New York
- Record: 98–55 (.641)
- League place: 1st
- Owners: Walter O'Malley, James & Dearie Mulvey, Mary Louise Smith
- President: Walter O'Malley
- General managers: Buzzie Bavasi
- Managers: Walter Alston
- Television: WOR-TV
- Radio: WMGM; Vin Scully, Connie Desmond, André Baruch, Al Helfer; WHOM; Buck Canel

The 1955 Brooklyn Dodgers season was the 66th season for the Brooklyn Dodgers franchise in the MLB. The Dodgers finally fulfilled the promise of many previous Dodger teams. Although the club had won several pennants in the past, and had won as many as 105 games in 1953, it had never won a World Series. This team finished 13.5 games ahead in the National League pennant race, leading the league in both runs scored and fewest runs allowed. In the World Series, they finally beat their crosstown rivals, the New York Yankees. It was the Dodgers' first and only World Series championship won while located in Brooklyn. With their World Series victory, the '55 Dodgers became only the second wire-to-wire team (a team leading from opening day to season's end) in MLB history after the '27 Yankees.

== Offseason ==
- October 8, 1954: Ray Moore was traded by the Dodgers to the Baltimore Orioles for Chico García.
- December 13, 1954: Billy Cox and Preacher Roe were traded by the Dodgers to the Baltimore Orioles for Johnny Jancse, Harry Schwegeman and cash.
- March 17, 1955: Erv Palica was traded by the Dodgers to the Baltimore Orioles for Frank Kellert and cash.

== Regular season ==
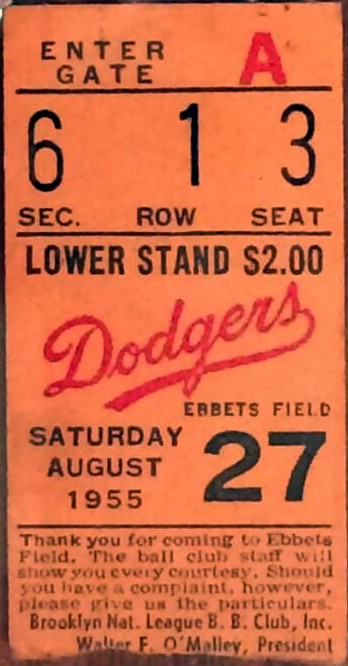
Sandy Koufax earned his first major league win with the Dodgers on August 27, 1955.

This season was basically a culmination of the careers of many legendary Dodger players. Catcher Roy Campanella won the 1955 National League Most Valuable Player award, his third in five years. Center fielder Duke Snider led the league in runs batted in and was second in the MVP voting. He also hit his 200th career home run on May 10. Jackie Robinson and Pee Wee Reese, both 36 years old, could still play. Gil Hodges, 31, hit 27 home runs (and drove in both Dodger runs in the seventh game of the Series), while Carl Furillo, 33, hit 26 home runs with a .314 batting average.

The pitching staff was anchored by Don Newcombe, who was 20–5. It was the first time a black pitcher had won 20 games in a season. The 22-year-old Johnny Podres was only 9–10 but became the hero of the 1955 World Series by shutting out the Yankees in the seventh game.

=== MVP controversy ===
Duke Snider finished second to teammate Campanella in the MVP voting by just five points, 226–221, with each man receiving eight first place votes. The voting then as now was conducted by the Baseball Writers' Association of America. Each voting member, one from each major league city, filled out a ballot selecting ten men. A player receiving a first place vote got 14 points, then values of 9–8–7–6–5–4–3–2–1 for those in places 2 through 10. A writer from Philadelphia who was sick and who had become hospitalized had turned in a ballot with Campanella listed in position number 1 as well as position number 5. The assumption had been that the writer had meant to write Snider's name into one of those slots. Unable to get a clarification from the ill writer the BBWAA, after considering disallowing the ballot, decided to accept it, count the first place vote for Campanella and count the fifth place vote as though it were left blank. Had the ballot been disallowed, the vote would have been won by Snider by three points. Had Snider gotten the fifth place vote, the final vote would have favored Snider 227–226. Duke did, however, win the Sporting News National League Player of the Year Award for 1955 and the Sid Mercer Award.

=== Season standings ===
National League
Team	W	L	Pct.	GB	Home	Road
Brooklyn Dodgers	98	55	.641	—	56‍–‍21	42‍–‍34
Milwaukee Braves	85	69	.552	13½	46‍–‍31	39‍–‍38
New York Giants	80	74	.519	18½	44‍–‍35	36‍–‍39
Philadelphia Phillies	77	77	.500	21½	46‍–‍31	31‍–‍46
Cincinnati Redlegs	75	79	.487	23½	46‍–‍31	29‍–‍48
Chicago Cubs	72	81	.471	26	43‍–‍33	29‍–‍48
St. Louis Cardinals	68	86	.442	30½	41‍–‍36	27‍–‍50
Pittsburgh Pirates	60	94	.390	38½	36‍–‍39	24‍–‍55

=== Record vs. opponents ===
1955 National League record Sources:
Team	BRO	CHC	CIN	MIL	NYG	PHI	PIT	STL
Brooklyn	—	14–7–1	12–10	15–7	13–9	16–6	14–8	14–8
Chicago	7–14–1	—	11–11	7–15	12–10	10–12	11–11	14–8
Cincinnati	10–12	11–11	—	9–13	9–13	11–11	14–8	11–11
Milwaukee	7–15	15–7	13–9	—	14–8	14–8	11–11	11–11
New York	9–13	10–12	13–9	8–14	—	10–12	17–5	13–9
Philadelphia	6–16	12–10	11–11	8–14	12–10	—	15–7	13–9
Pittsburgh	8–14	11–11	8–14	11–11	5–17	7–15	—	10–12
St. Louis	8–14	8–14	11–11	11–11	9–13	9–13	12–10	—

=== Opening Day Lineup ===
Opening Day Lineup
#	Name	Position
19	Jim Gilliam	2B
1	Pee Wee Reese	SS
4	Duke Snider	CF
14	Gil Hodges	1B
15	Sandy Amorós	LF
42	Jackie Robinson	3B
6	Carl Furillo	RF
39	Roy Campanella	C
17	Carl Erskine	P

=== Notable transactions ===
- June 7, 1955: Ron Negray was traded by the Dodgers to the Philadelphia Phillies for Dave Cole and cash.
- June 9, 1955: Joe Black was traded by the Dodgers to the Cincinnati Reds for Bob Borkowski and cash.
- September 12, 1955: Glenn Cox was purchased from the Dodgers by the Kansas City Athletics.

=== Roster ===
1955 Brooklyn Dodgers
Roster
Pitchers: 46 Don Bessent; 49 Joe Black; 40 Roger Craig; 17 Carl Erskine; 18 Jim Hughes; 32 Sandy Koufax; 41 Clem Labine; 27 Tommy Lasorda; 30 Billy Loes; 34 Russ Meyer; 36 Don Newcombe; 45 Johnny Podres; 37 Ed Roebuck; 48 Karl Spooner; 28 Chuck Templeton	Catchers: 39 Roy Campanella; 54 Dixie Howell; 10 Rube Walker; Infielders: 19 Jim Gilliam; 43 Don Hoak; 14 Gil Hodges; 12 Frank Kellert; 1 Pee Wee Reese; 42 Jackie Robinson; 23 Don Zimmer	Outfielders: 15 Sandy Amorós; 27 Bob Borkowski; 6 Carl Furillo; 51 Bert Hamric; 49 Walt Moryn; 8 George Shuba; 4 Duke Snider	Manager: 24 Walter Alston; Coaches: 33 Joe Becker; 22 Billy Herman; 31 Jake Pitler

== Player stats ==
= Indicates team leader

= Indicates league leader

=== Batting ===
==== Starters by position ====
Note: Pos = Position; G = Games played; AB = At bats; R = Runs; H = Hits; Avg. = Batting average; HR = Home runs; RBI = Runs batted in; SB = Stolen bases

Pos	Player	GP	AB	R	H	Avg.	HR	RBI	SB
C	Roy Campanella	123	446	81	142	.318	32	107	2
1B	Gil Hodges	150	546	75	158	.289	27	102	2
2B	Jim Gilliam	147	538	110	134	.249	7	40	15
SS	Pee Wee Reese	145	553	99	156	.282	10	61	8
3B	Jackie Robinson	105	317	51	81	.256	8	36	12
LF	Sandy Amorós	119	388	59	96	.247	10	51	10
CF	Duke Snider	148	538	126	166	.309	42	136	9
RF	Carl Furillo	140	523	83	164	.314	26	95	4

==== Other batters ====
Note: G = Games played; AB = At bats; R = Runs; H = Hits; Avg. = Batting average; HR = Home runs; RBI = Runs batted in; SB = Stolen bases

Player	G	AB	R	H	Avg.	HR	RBI	SB
Don Zimmer	88	280	38	67	.239	15	50	5
Don Hoak	94	279	50	67	.240	5	19	9
Rube Walker	48	103	6	26	.252	2	13	1
Frank Kellert	39	80	12	26	.325	4	19	0
George Shuba	44	51	8	14	.275	1	8	0
Dixie Howell	16	42	2	11	.262	0	5	0
Walt Moryn	11	19	3	5	.263	1	3	0
Bob Borkowski	9	19	2	2	.105	0	0	0
Bert Hamric	2	1	0	0	.000	0	0	0

=== Pitching ===
==== Starting pitchers ====
Note: G = Games pitched; GS = Games started; CG = Complete games; IP = Innings pitched; W = Wins; L = Losses; ERA = Earned run average; BB = Bases on balls; SO = Strikeouts

Player	G	GS	CG	IP	W	L	ERA	BB	SO
Don Newcombe	34	31	17	233.2	20	5	3.20	38	143
Carl Erskine	31	29	7	194.2	11	8	3.79	64	84
Johnny Podres	27	24	5	159.1	9	10	3.95	57	114
Billy Loes	22	19	6	128.0	10	4	3.59	46	85

==== Other pitchers ====
Note: G = Games pitched; GS = Games started; CG = Complete games; IP = Innings pitched; W = Wins; L = Losses; ERA = Earned run average; BB = Bases on balls; SO = Strikeouts

Player	G	GS	CG	IP	W	L	ERA	BB	SO
Karl Spooner	29	14	2	98.2	8	6	3.65	41	78
Roger Craig	21	10	3	90.2	5	3	2.78	43	48
Russ Meyer	18	11	2	73.0	6	2	5.42	31	26
Sandy Koufax	12	5	2	41.2	2	2	3.02	28	30
Tommy Lasorda	4	1	0	4.0	0	0	13.50	6	4

==== Relief pitchers ====
Note: G = Games pitched; IP = Innings pitched; W = Wins; L = Losses; SV = Saves; ERA = Earned run average; BB = Bases on balls; SO = Strikeouts

Player	G	IP	W	L	SV	ERA	BB	SO
Clem Labine	60	144.1	13	5	11	3.24	55	67
Ed Roebuck	47	84.0	5	6	12	4.71	24	33
Don Bessent	24	63.1	8	1	3	2.70	21	29
Jim Hughes	24	42.2	0	2	6	4.22	19	20
Joe Black	6	15.1	1	0	0	2.93	5	9
Chuck Templeton	4	4.2	0	1	0	11.57	5	3

== 1955 World Series ==
=== Game 1 ===
September 28, 1955, at Yankee Stadium in New York

Team	1	2	3	4	5	6	7	8	9	R	H	E
Brooklyn (N)	0	2	1	0	0	0	0	2	0	5	10	0
New York (A)	0	2	1	1	0	2	0	0	x	6	9	1
W: Whitey Ford (1–0) L: Don Newcombe (0–1) S: Bob Grim (1)
HR: BRO – Carl Furillo (1), Duke Snider (1) NYY – Elston Howard (1), Joe Collins (1, 2)

=== Game 2 ===
September 29, 1955, at Yankee Stadium in New York

Team	1	2	3	4	5	6	7	8	9	R	H	E
Brooklyn (N)	0	0	0	1	1	0	0	0	0	2	5	2
New York (A)	0	0	0	4	0	0	0	0	x	4	8	0
W: Tommy Byrne (1–0) L: Billy Loes (0–1)

=== Game 3 ===
September 30, 1955, at Ebbets Field in Brooklyn, New York

Team	1	2	3	4	5	6	7	8	9	R	H	E
New York (A)	0	2	0	0	0	0	1	0	0	3	7	0
Brooklyn (N)	2	2	0	2	0	0	2	0	x	8	11	1
W: Johnny Podres (1–0) L: Bob Turley (0–1)
HR: NYY – Mickey Mantle (1) BRO – Roy Campanella (1)

=== Game 4 ===
October 1, 1955, at Ebbets Field in Brooklyn, New York

Team	1	2	3	4	5	6	7	8	9	R	H	E
New York (A)	1	1	0	1	0	2	0	0	0	5	9	0
Brooklyn (N)	0	0	1	3	3	0	1	0	x	8	14	0
W: Clem Labine (1–0) L: Don Larsen (0–1)
HR: NYY – Gil McDougald (1) BRO – Roy Campanella (2), Gil Hodges (1), Duke Snider (2)

=== Game 5 ===
October 2, 1955, at Ebbets Field in Brooklyn, New York

Team	1	2	3	4	5	6	7	8	9	R	H	E
New York (A)	0	0	0	1	0	0	1	1	0	3	6	0
Brooklyn (N)	0	2	1	0	1	0	0	1	x	5	9	2
W: Roger Craig (1–0) L: Bob Grim (0–1) S: Clem Labine (1)
HR: NYY – Bob Cerv (1), Yogi Berra (1) BRO – Sandy Amorós (1), Duke Snider (3, 4)

=== Game 6 ===
October 3, 1955, at Yankee Stadium in New York

Team	1	2	3	4	5	6	7	8	9	R	H	E
Brooklyn (N)	0	0	0	1	0	0	0	0	0	1	4	1
New York (A)	5	0	0	0	0	0	0	0	x	5	8	0
W: Whitey Ford (2–0) L: Karl Spooner (0–1)
HR: NYY – Bill Skowron (1)

=== Game 7 ===
October 4, 1955, at Yankee Stadium in New York

Team	1	2	3	4	5	6	7	8	9	R	H	E
Brooklyn (N)	0	0	0	1	0	1	0	0	0	2	5	0
New York (A)	0	0	0	0	0	0	0	0	0	0	8	1
W: Johnny Podres (2–0) L: Tommy Byrne (1–1)

== Awards and honors ==
- National League Most Valuable Player
  - Roy Campanella
- World Series Most Valuable Player
  - Johnny Podres
- TSN Manager of the Year Award
  - Walter Alston
- TSN Executive of the Year Award
  - Walter O'Malley
- TSN Major League Player of the Year Award
  - Duke Snider
- TSN National League Player of the Year Award
  - Duke Snider

=== All-Stars ===
- 1955 Major League Baseball All-Star Game
  - Duke Snider starter
  - Roy Campanella reserve
  - Gil Hodges reserve
  - Don Newcombe reserve
- TSN Major League All-Star Team
  - Don Newcombe
  - Roy Campanella
  - Duke Snider

=== League top five finishers ===
Roy Campanella

- #4 in NL in batting average (.318)

Jim Gilliam

- #5 in NL in runs scored (110)
- #5 in NL in stolen bases (15)

Clem Labine

- #3 in NL in saves (11)

Don Newcombe

- #2 in NL in wins (20)
- #2 in NL in ERA (3.20)
- #2 in NL in complete games (17)
- #5 in NL in strikeouts (143)

Ed Roebuck

- #2 in NL in saves (12)

Duke Snider

- MLB leader in RBI (136)
- MLB leader in runs scored (126)
- #2 in NL in on-base percentage (.418)
- #2 in NL in slugging percentage (.628)
- #3 in NL in doubles (34)
- #3 in NL in bases on balls (104)
- #4 in NL in home runs (42)

== Farm system ==
Level	Team	League	Manager
AAA	Montreal Royals	International League	Greg Mulleavy
AAA	St. Paul Saints	American Association	Max Macon
AA	Ft. Worth Cats	Texas League	Tommy Holmes
AA	Mobile Bears	Southern Association	Clay Bryant
A	Elmira Pioneers	Eastern League	Ray Hathaway
A	Pueblo Dodgers	Western League	Goldie Holt
B	Asheville Tourists	Tri-State League	Earl Naylor
B	Cedar Rapids Raiders	Illinois–Indiana–Iowa League	Ray Perry
B	Newport News Dodgers	Piedmont League	George Scherger
C	Bakersfield Indians	California League	Doc Alexson
C	Great Falls Electrics	Pioneer League	Lou Rochelli
D	Hornell Dodgers	Pennsylvania–Ontario–New York League	Boyd Bartley
D	Shawnee Hawks	Sooner State League	Jack Banta
D	Thomasville Dodgers	Georgia–Florida League	Pete Reiser
D	Union City Dodgers	Kentucky–Illinois–Tennessee League	Joe Hauser

== Aftermath and legacy ==
The 1955 World Series proved to the only title the Dodgers won in Brooklyn. After losing the 1956 World Series to the Yankees, the team would move to Los Angeles after the 1957 season.

With the death of Carl Erskine in April 2024, Sandy Koufax became the last surviving player from the 1955 team.

=== 50th Anniversary ===
In August 2005, the Los Angeles Dodgers commemorated the 50th anniversary of the franchise winning its first World Series, and only one while in Brooklyn. The eleven surviving members of the 1955 team all attended the weekend celebration.

No official commemorative event, however, took place in Brooklyn on October 4, 2005 (the actual anniversary of the Dodgers' triumph), prompting author Thomas Oliphant to argue that "on both coasts, we could have done a little bit better, especially for such an important memory."

That being said, a small gathering of ten people took place at the site of Ebbets Field on October 4, 2005 "at 3:43 pm, 50 years to the minute from when the Brooklyn Dodgers won their only World Series." Brooklyn Paper journalist Ed Shakespeare reported that "[a]ll of the attendees came alone or in pairs, unaware of who else might attend", describing the event as "a sharing of memories from those who remembered."
