= 1955 Cincinnati Redlegs season =

1955 Cincinnati Redlegs
- League: National League
- Ballpark: Crosley Field
- City: Cincinnati
- Owners: Powel Crosley Jr.
- General managers: Gabe Paul
- Managers: Birdie Tebbetts
- Television: WCPO-TV (Waite Hoyt, Jack Moran)
- Radio: WSAI (Waite Hoyt, Jack Moran)

The 1955 Cincinnati Redlegs season was a season in American baseball. It consisted of the Redlegs finishing in fifth place in the National League, with a record of 75–79, 23 1/2 games behind the NL and World Series Champion Brooklyn Dodgers. The Redlegs were managed by Birdie Tebbetts and played their home games at Crosley Field.

== Offseason ==
- October 1, 1954: Jim Bolger, Harry Perkowski and Ted Tappe were traded by the Redlegs to the Chicago Cubs for Johnny Klippstein and Jim Willis.
- December 8, 1954: Frank Smith was traded by the Redlegs to the St. Louis Cardinals for Ray Jablonski and Gerry Staley.
- February 10, 1955: Lloyd Merriman was purchased from the Redlegs by the Chicago White Sox.
- Prior to 1955 season (exact date unknown)
  - Jesse Gonder was signed as an amateur free agent by the Redlegs.
  - Ernie Broglio was acquired from the Cincinnati Redlegs by the Stockton Ports.

== Regular season ==
=== Season standings ===
National League
Team	W	L	Pct.	GB	Home	Road
Brooklyn Dodgers	98	55	.641	—	56‍–‍21	42‍–‍34
Milwaukee Braves	85	69	.552	13½	46‍–‍31	39‍–‍38
New York Giants	80	74	.519	18½	44‍–‍35	36‍–‍39
Philadelphia Phillies	77	77	.500	21½	46‍–‍31	31‍–‍46
Cincinnati Redlegs	75	79	.487	23½	46‍–‍31	29‍–‍48
Chicago Cubs	72	81	.471	26	43‍–‍33	29‍–‍48
St. Louis Cardinals	68	86	.442	30½	41‍–‍36	27‍–‍50
Pittsburgh Pirates	60	94	.390	38½	36‍–‍39	24‍–‍55

=== Record vs. opponents ===
1955 National League record Sources:
Team	BRO	CHC	CIN	MIL	NYG	PHI	PIT	STL
Brooklyn	—	14–7–1	12–10	15–7	13–9	16–6	14–8	14–8
Chicago	7–14–1	—	11–11	7–15	12–10	10–12	11–11	14–8
Cincinnati	10–12	11–11	—	9–13	9–13	11–11	14–8	11–11
Milwaukee	7–15	15–7	13–9	—	14–8	14–8	11–11	11–11
New York	9–13	10–12	13–9	8–14	—	10–12	17–5	13–9
Philadelphia	6–16	12–10	11–11	8–14	12–10	—	15–7	13–9
Pittsburgh	8–14	11–11	8–14	11–11	5–17	7–15	—	10–12
St. Louis	8–14	8–14	11–11	11–11	9–13	9–13	12–10	—

=== Notable transactions ===
- April 30, 1955: Andy Seminick, Glen Gorbous, and Jim Greengrass were traded by the Redlegs to the Philadelphia Phillies for Smoky Burgess, Stan Palys and Steve Ridzik.
- September 10, 1955: Gene Hayden was obtained by the Redlegs from the Seattle Rainiers as part of a working agreement.
- September 14, 1955: Gerry Staley was selected off waivers from the Redlegs by the New York Yankees.

=== Roster ===
1955 Cincinnati Redlegs
Roster
Pitchers: 46 Fred Baczewski; 49 Joe Black; 34 Jackie Collum; 43 Maurice Fisher; 51 Art Fowler; 30 Hersh Freeman; 31 Don Gross; 37 Bob Hooper; 35 Johnny Klippstein; 31 Jerry Lane; 36 Rudy Minarcin; 39 Joe Nuxhall; 32 Jim Pearce; 38 Bud Podbielan; 33 Steve Ridzik; 42 Gerry Staley; 49 Corky Valentine	Catchers: 6 Ed Bailey; 6 Matt Batts; 7 Smoky Burgess; 5 Hobie Landrith; 7 Andy Seminick; Infielders: 12 Bobby Adams; 14 Rocky Bridges; 10 Chuck Harmon; 15 Ray Jablonski; 18 Ted Kluszewski; 11 Roy McMillan; 12 Milt Smith; 16 Johnny Temple	Outfielders: 25 Gus Bell; 24 Bob Borkowski; 27 Glen Gorbous; 23 Jim Greengrass; 26 Bob Hazle; 24 Sam Mele; 23 Stan Palys; 28 Wally Post; 27 Al Silvera; 22 Bob Thurman; Other batters: 26 Joe Brovia	Manager: 1 Birdie Tebbetts; Coaches: 2 Dick Bartell; 4 Jimmy Dykes; 3 Tom Ferrick

== Player stats ==
= Indicates team leader

=== Batting ===
==== Starters by position ====
Note: Pos = Position; G = Games played; AB = At bats; H = Hits; Avg. = Batting average; HR = Home runs; RBI = Runs batted in

Pos	Player	G	AB	H	Avg.	HR	RBI
C	Smokey Burgess	116	421	129	.306	20	77
1B	Ted Kluszewski	153	612	192	.314	47	113
2B	Johnny Temple	150	588	165	.281	0	50
SS	Roy McMillan	151	470	126	.268	1	37
3B	Rocky Bridges	95	168	48	.286	1	18
LF	Stan Palys	79	222	51	.230	7	30
CF	Gus Bell	154	610	188	.308	27	104
RF	Wally Post	154	601	186	.309	40	109

==== Other batters ====
Note: G = Games played; AB = At bats; H = Hits; Avg. = Batting average; HR = Home runs; RBI = Runs batted in

Player	G	AB	H	Avg.	HR	RBI
Ray Jablonski	74	221	53	.240	9	28
Chuck Harmon	96	198	50	.253	5	28
Bob Thurman	82	152	33	.217	7	22
Bobby Adams	64	150	41	.273	2	20
Milt Smith	36	102	20	.196	3	8
Hobie Landrith	43	87	22	.253	4	7
Matt Batts	26	71	18	.254	0	13
Sam Mele	35	62	13	.210	2	7
Jim Greengrass	13	39	4	.103	0	1
Ed Bailey	21	39	8	.205	1	4
Glen Gorbous	8	18	6	.333	0	4
Bob Borkowski	25	18	3	.167	0	1
Joe Brovia	21	18	2	.111	0	4
Andy Seminick	6	15	2	.133	1	1
Bob Hazle	6	13	3	.231	0	0
Al Silvera	13	7	1	.143	0	2

=== Pitching ===
==== Starting pitchers ====
Note: G = Games pitched; IP = Innings pitched; W = Wins; L = Losses; ERA = Earned run average; SO = Strikeouts

Player	G	IP	W	L	ERA	SO
Joe Nuxhall	50	257.0	17	12	3.47	98
Art Fowler	46	207.2	11	10	3.90	94

==== Other pitchers ====
Note: G = Games pitched; IP = Innings pitched; W = Wins; L = Losses; ERA = Earned run average; SO = Strikeouts

Player	G	IP	W	L	ERA	SO
Johnny Klippstein	39	138.0	9	10	3.39	68
Jackie Collum	32	134.0	9	8	3.63	49
Gerry Staley	30	119.2	5	8	4.66	40
Rudy Minarcin	41	115.2	5	9	4.90	45
Joe Black	32	102.1	5	2	4.22	54
Don Gross	17	67.1	4	5	4.14	33
Steve Ridzik	13	30.0	0	3	4.50	6
Corky Valentine	10	26.2	2	1	7.43	14
Jim Pearce	2	3.1	0	1	10.80	0

==== Relief pitchers ====
Note: G = Games pitched; W = Wins; L = Losses; SV = Saves; ERA = Earned run average; SO = Strikeouts

Player	G	W	L	SV	ERA	SO
Hersh Freeman	52	7	4	11	2.16	37
Bud Podbielan	17	1	2	0	3.21	26
Bob Hooper	8	0	2	0	7.62	6
Jerry Lane	8	0	2	1	4.91	5
Maurice Fisher	1	0	0	0	6.75	1
Fred Baczewski	1	0	0	0	18.00	1

== Awards and honors ==
All-Star Game

- Ted Kluszewski, Outfield, Starter
- Smokey Burgess, Catcher, Reserve
- Joe Nuxhall, Pitcher, Reserve

== Farm system ==
Level	Team	League	Manager
AAA	Havana Sugar Kings	International League	Reggie Otero
AA	Nashville Vols	Southern Association	Joe Schultz
A	Columbia Reds	Sally League	Ernie White
B	High Point-Thomasville Hi-Toms	Carolina League	Jimmy Brown
B	Sunbury Redlegs	Piedmont League	Virgil Stallcup and Dutch Dorman
C	Duluth Dukes	Northern League	Red Treadway and Jim Crandall
C	Ogden Reds	Pioneer League	Jim Crandall and Red Treadway
D	Fort Walton Beach Jets	Alabama–Florida League	John Streza and Shovel Hodge
D	Douglas Trojans	Georgia State League	Bob Wellman
D	Moultrie Reds	Georgia–Florida League	Ken Polivka

LEAGUE CO-CHAMPIONS: Douglas
