= 1955 Milwaukee Braves season =

Major League Baseball season

1955 Milwaukee Braves
- League: National League
- Ballpark: Milwaukee County Stadium
- City: Milwaukee, Wisconsin
- Record: 85–69 (.552)
- League place: 2nd
- Owners: Louis R. Perini
- General managers: John J. Quinn
- Managers: Charlie Grimm
- Radio: WEMP; WTMJ (Earl Gillespie, Blaine Walsh)

The 1955 Milwaukee Braves season was the third in Milwaukee and the 85th overall season of the franchise.

== Offseason ==
- March 4, 1955: Catfish Metkovich was released by the Braves.
- Prior to 1955 season: (exact date unknown)
  - Marshall Bridges was acquired by the Braves from the New York Giants.
  - Chi-Chi Olivo was signed as an amateur free agent by the Braves.

== Regular season ==
=== Season standings ===
National League
Team	W	L	Pct.	GB	Home	Road
Brooklyn Dodgers	98	55	.641	—	56‍–‍21	42‍–‍34
Milwaukee Braves	85	69	.552	13½	46‍–‍31	39‍–‍38
New York Giants	80	74	.519	18½	44‍–‍35	36‍–‍39
Philadelphia Phillies	77	77	.500	21½	46‍–‍31	31‍–‍46
Cincinnati Redlegs	75	79	.487	23½	46‍–‍31	29‍–‍48
Chicago Cubs	72	81	.471	26	43‍–‍33	29‍–‍48
St. Louis Cardinals	68	86	.442	30½	41‍–‍36	27‍–‍50
Pittsburgh Pirates	60	94	.390	38½	36‍–‍39	24‍–‍55

=== Record vs. opponents ===
1955 National League record Sources:
Team	BRO	CHC	CIN	MIL	NYG	PHI	PIT	STL
Brooklyn	—	14–7–1	12–10	15–7	13–9	16–6	14–8	14–8
Chicago	7–14–1	—	11–11	7–15	12–10	10–12	11–11	14–8
Cincinnati	10–12	11–11	—	9–13	9–13	11–11	14–8	11–11
Milwaukee	7–15	15–7	13–9	—	14–8	14–8	11–11	11–11
New York	9–13	10–12	13–9	8–14	—	10–12	17–5	13–9
Philadelphia	6–16	12–10	11–11	8–14	12–10	—	15–7	13–9
Pittsburgh	8–14	11–11	8–14	11–11	5–17	7–15	—	10–12
St. Louis	8–14	8–14	11–11	11–11	9–13	9–13	12–10	—

=== Notable transactions ===
- June 3, 1955: Pete Whisenant was traded by the Braves to the St. Louis Cardinals for Del Rice.

=== Roster ===
1955 Milwaukee Braves
Roster
Pitchers: 10 Bob Buhl; 33 Lew Burdette; 22 Gene Conley; 12,20 Ray Crone; 30 John Edelman; 15 Charlie Gorin; 47 Joey Jay; 32 Ernie Johnson; 16 Dave Jolly; 20 Dave Koslo; 17 Chet Nichols Jr.; 11 Phil Paine; 49 Humberto Robinson; 21 Warren Spahn; 29 Roberto Vargas	Catchers: 1 Del Crandall; 7 Del Rice; 24 Bob Roselli; 24 Charlie White; Infielders: 9 Joe Adcock; 39 George Crowe; 6 Jack Dittmer; 23 Johnny Logan; 41 Eddie Mathews; 4,27 Danny O'Connell; 3 Jim Pendleton; 19 Ben Taylor	Outfielders: 44 Hank Aaron; 38 Bill Bruton; 48 Andy Pafko; 18 Chuck Tanner; 34 Bobby Thomson	Manager: 40 Charlie Grimm; Coaches: 28 Johnny Cooney; 35 Bob Keely; 31 Bucky Walters

== Player stats ==
=== Batting ===
==== Starters by position ====
Note: Pos = Position; G = Games played; AB = At bats; H = Hits; Avg. = Batting average; HR = Home runs; RBI = Runs batted in

Pos	Player	G	AB	H	Avg.	HR	RBI
C	Del Crandall	133	440	104	.236	26	62
1B	George Crowe	104	303	85	.281	15	55
2B	Danny O'Connell	124	453	102	.225	6	40
SS	Johnny Logan	154	595	177	.297	13	83
3B	Eddie Mathews	141	499	144	.289	41	101
LF	Bobby Thomson	101	343	88	.257	12	56
CF	Bill Bruton	149	636	175	.275	9	47
RF	Hank Aaron	153	602	189	.314	27	106

==== Other batters ====
Note: G = Games played; AB = At bats; H = Hits; Avg. = Batting average; HR = Home runs; RBI = Runs batted in

Player	G	AB	H	Avg.	HR	RBI
Joe Adcock	84	288	76	.264	15	45
Andy Pafko	86	252	67	.266	5	34
Chuck Tanner	97	243	60	.247	6	27
Jack Dittmer	38	72	9	.125	1	4
Del Rice	27	71	14	.197	2	7
Charlie White	12	30	7	.233	0	4
Ben Taylor	12	10	1	.100	0	0
Jim Pendleton	8	10	0	.000	0	0
Bob Roselli	6	9	2	.222	0	0

=== Pitching ===
==== Starting pitchers ====
Note: G = Games pitched; IP = Innings pitched; W = Wins; L = Losses; ERA = Earned run average; SO = Strikeouts

Player	G	IP	W	L	ERA	SO
Warren Spahn	39	245.2	17	14	3.26	110
Lew Burdette	42	230.0	13	8	4.03	70
Bob Buhl	38	201.2	13	11	3.21	117
Gene Conley	22	158.0	11	7	4.16	107

==== Other pitchers ====
Note: G = Games pitched; IP = Innings pitched; W = Wins; L = Losses; ERA = Earned run average; SO = Strikeouts

Player	G	IP	W	L	ERA	SO
Chet Nichols Jr.	34	144.0	9	8	4.00	44
Ray Crone	33	140.1	10	9	3.46	76
Humberto Robinson	13	38.0	3	1	3.08	19

==== Relief pitchers ====
Note: G = Games pitched; W = Wins; L = Losses; SV = Saves; ERA = Earned run average; SO = Strikeouts

Player	G	W	L	SV	ERA	SO
Ernie Johnson	40	5	7	4	3.42	43
Dave Jolly	36	2	3	2	5.71	23
Roberto Vargas	25	0	0	2	8.76	13
Phil Paine	15	2	0	0	2.49	26
Joey Jay	12	0	0	0	4.74	3
John Edelman	5	0	0	0	11.12	3
Charlie Gorin	2	0	0	0	54.00	0
Dave Koslo	1	0	1	0	inf	0

== Awards and honors ==
All-Star Game

- Del Crandall, catcher, starter
- Eddie Mathews, third base, starter
- Hank Aaron, reserve
- Gene Conley, reserve
- Johnny Logan, reserve

== Farm system ==
Level	Team	League	Manager
AAA	Toledo Sox	American Association	George Selkirk
AA	Atlanta Crackers	Southern Association	George McQuinn, Marvin Rackley and Clyde King
AA	Beaumont Exporters	Texas League	Mickey Livingston
A	Jacksonville Braves	Sally League	Ben Geraghty
B	Corpus Christi Clippers	Big State League	Connie Ryan
B	Evansville Braves	Illinois–Indiana–Iowa League	Bob Coleman
C	Eau Claire Braves	Northern League	Joe Just
C	Boise Braves	Pioneer League	Lou Stringer
C	Quebec Braves	Provincial League	Sibby Sisti
D	West Palm Beach Indians	Florida State League	Bill Steinecke
D	Wellsville Braves	PONY League	Alex Monchak
D	Lawton Braves	Sooner State League	Travis Jackson

LEAGUE CHAMPIONS: Corpus Christi, Quebec, Lawton
