= 1955 St. Louis Cardinals season =

Major League Baseball season

1955 St. Louis Cardinals
- League: National League
- Ballpark: Busch Stadium I
- City: St. Louis, Missouri
- Record: 68–86 (.442)
- League place: 7th
- Owners: August "Gussie" Busch
- General managers: Richard A. Meyer
- Managers: Eddie Stanky, Harry Walker
- Television: KTVI
- Radio: KMOX (Harry Caray, Jack Buck, Joe Garagiola)
- Stats: ESPN.com; Baseball Reference

The 1955 St. Louis Cardinals season was the team's 74th season in St. Louis, Missouri and the 64th season in the National League. The Cardinals went 68–86 during the season and finished seventh in the National League, 30 1/2 games behind the Brooklyn Dodgers.

Outfielder Bill Virdon won the Rookie of the Year Award this year, batting .281, with 17 home runs and 68 RBIs. This was the second consecutive year a Cardinal won the Rookie of the Year Award, with Wally Moon winning the previous season. The Cardinals would have this occur again in 1985 and 1986, with Vince Coleman and Todd Worrell, respectively.

== Offseason ==
- October 19, 1954: Peanuts Lowrey was released by the Cardinals.
- November 22, 1954: Jim King was drafted from the Cardinals by the Chicago Cubs in the 1954 rule 5 draft.
- November 30, 1954: Benny Valenzuela was drafted by the Cardinals from the Bisbee-Douglas Copper Kings in the 1954 minor league draft.
- December 8, 1954: Ray Jablonski and Gerry Staley were traded by the Cardinals to the Cincinnati Redlegs for Frank Smith.
- Prior to 1955 season: Duke Carmel was signed as an amateur free agent by the Cardinals.

== Regular season ==
=== Season standings ===
National League
Team	W	L	Pct.	GB	Home	Road
Brooklyn Dodgers	98	55	.641	—	56‍–‍21	42‍–‍34
Milwaukee Braves	85	69	.552	13½	46‍–‍31	39‍–‍38
New York Giants	80	74	.519	18½	44‍–‍35	36‍–‍39
Philadelphia Phillies	77	77	.500	21½	46‍–‍31	31‍–‍46
Cincinnati Redlegs	75	79	.487	23½	46‍–‍31	29‍–‍48
Chicago Cubs	72	81	.471	26	43‍–‍33	29‍–‍48
St. Louis Cardinals	68	86	.442	30½	41‍–‍36	27‍–‍50
Pittsburgh Pirates	60	94	.390	38½	36‍–‍39	24‍–‍55

=== Record vs. opponents ===
1955 National League record Sources:
Team	BRO	CHC	CIN	MIL	NYG	PHI	PIT	STL
Brooklyn	—	14–7–1	12–10	15–7	13–9	16–6	14–8	14–8
Chicago	7–14–1	—	11–11	7–15	12–10	10–12	11–11	14–8
Cincinnati	10–12	11–11	—	9–13	9–13	11–11	14–8	11–11
Milwaukee	7–15	15–7	13–9	—	14–8	14–8	11–11	11–11
New York	9–13	10–12	13–9	8–14	—	10–12	17–5	13–9
Philadelphia	6–16	12–10	11–11	8–14	12–10	—	15–7	13–9
Pittsburgh	8–14	11–11	8–14	11–11	5–17	7–15	—	10–12
St. Louis	8–14	8–14	11–11	11–11	9–13	9–13	12–10	—

=== Notable transactions ===
- June 3, 1955: Del Rice was traded by the Cardinals to the Milwaukee Braves for Pete Whisenant.

=== Roster ===
1955 St. Louis Cardinals
Roster
Pitchers: 38 Luis Arroyo; 37 Ben Flowers; 31 Al Gettel; 42 Harvey Haddix; 39 Larry Jackson; 1 Tony Jacobs; 45 Gordon Jones; 35 Paul LaPalme; 31 Brooks Lawrence; 28 John Mackinson; 41 Lindy McDaniel; 40 Herb Moford; 23 Tom Poholsky; 17 Vic Raschi; 44 Willard Schmidt; 43 Barney Schultz; 25 Frank Smith; 34 Bobby Tiefenauer; 41 Floyd Wooldridge; 17 Mel Wright	Catchers: 18 Nelson Burbrink; 16 Dick Rand; 18 Del Rice; 15 Bill Sarni; Infielders: 10 Tom Alston; 3 Don Blasingame; 14 Ken Boyer; 4 Alex Grammas; 7 Solly Hemus; 6 Stan Musial; 2 Red Schoendienst; 19 Dick Schofield; 21 Bob Stephenson	Outfielders: 11 Harry Elliott; 24 Joe Frazier; 20 Wally Moon; 8 Rip Repulski; 9 Bill Virdon; 5 Harry Walker; 10 Pete Whisenant	Manager: 12 Eddie Stanky; 5 Harry Walker; Coaches: 27 Lou Kahn; 33 Bill Posedel; 29 Johnny Riddle; 30 Dixie Walker

== Player stats ==
=== Batting ===
==== Starters by position ====
Note: Pos = Position; G = Games played; AB = At bats; H = Hits; Avg. = Batting average; HR = Home runs; RBI = Runs batted in

Pos	Player	G	AB	H	Avg.	HR	RBI
C	Bill Sarni	107	325	83	.255	3	34
1B	Stan Musial	154	562	179	.319	33	108
2B	Red Schoendienst	145	553	148	.268	11	51
SS	Alex Grammas	128	366	88	.240	3	25
3B	Ken Boyer	147	530	140	.264	18	62
LF	Rip Repulski	147	512	138	.270	23	73
CF	Bill Virdon	144	534	150	.281	17	68
RF	Wally Moon	152	593	175	.295	19	76

==== Other batters ====
Note: G = Games played; AB = At bats; H = Hits; Avg. = Batting average; HR = Home runs; RBI = Runs batted in

Player	G	AB	H	Avg.	HR	RBI
Solly Hemus	96	206	50	.243	5	21
Nelson Burbrink	58	170	47	.276	0	15
Harry Elliott	68	117	30	.256	1	12
Pete Whisenant	58	115	22	.191	2	9
Bob Stephenson	67	111	27	.243	0	6
Joe Frazier	58	70	14	.200	4	9
Del Rice	20	59	12	.203	1	7
Don Blasingame	5	16	6	.375	0	0
Harry Walker	11	14	5	.357	0	1
Dick Rand	3	10	3	.300	1	3
Tom Alston	13	8	1	.125	0	0
Ducky Schofield	12	4	0	.000	0	0

=== Pitching ===
==== Starting pitchers ====
Note: G = Games pitched; IP = Innings pitched; W = Wins; L = Losses; ERA = Earned run average; SO = Strikeouts

Player	G	IP	W	L	ERA	SO
Harvey Haddix	37	208.0	12	16	4.46	150
Larry Jackson	37	177.1	9	14	4.31	88
Luis Arroyo	35	159.0	11	8	4.19	68
Tom Poholsky	30	151.0	9	11	3.81	66
Willard Schmidt	20	129.2	7	6	2.78	86
Ben Flowers	4	27.1	1	0	3.62	19
Vic Raschi	1	1.2	0	1	21.60	1

==== Other pitchers ====
Note: G = Games pitched; IP = Innings pitched; W = Wins; L = Losses; ERA = Earned run average; SO = Strikeouts

Player	G	IP	W	L	ERA	SO
Brooks Lawrence	46	96.0	3	8	6.56	52
Floyd Wooldridge	18	57.2	2	4	4.84	14
Gordon Jones	15	57.0	1	4	5.84	46
John Mackinson	8	20.2	0	1	7.84	8
Lindy McDaniel	4	19.0	0	0	4.74	7

==== Relief pitchers ====
Note: G = Games pitched; W = Wins; L = Losses; SV = Saves; ERA = Earned run average; SO = Strikeouts

Player	G	W	L	SV	ERA	SO
Paul LaPalme	56	4	3	2	2.75	39
Mel Wright	29	2	2	1	6.19	18
Frank Smith	28	3	1	1	3.23	17
Barney Schultz	19	1	2	4	7.89	19
Bobby Tiefenauer	18	1	4	0	4.41	16
Herb Moford	14	1	1	2	7.88	8
Al Gettel	8	1	0	0	9.00	7
Tony Jacobs	1	0	0	0	18.00	1

== Awards and honors ==
All-Star Game

- Red Schoendienst, second base, starter
- Luis Arroyo, reserve
- Harvey Haddix, reserve
- Stan Musial, reserve

== Farm system ==
Level	Team	League	Manager
AAA	Omaha Cardinals	American Association	Johnny Keane
AAA	Rochester Red Wings	International League	Harry Walker, Lou Kahn and Dixie Walker
AA	Houston Buffaloes	Texas League	Mike Ryba
A	Allentown Cardinals	Eastern League	Harold Olt
A	Columbus Cardinals	Sally League	Ferrell Anderson
B	Peoria Chiefs	Illinois–Indiana–Iowa League	Whitey Kurowski
B	Lynchburg Cardinals	Piedmont League	George Kissell
C	Mexicali Eagles	Arizona–Texas League	Art Lilly
C	Fresno Cardinals	California League	Roland LeBlanc
C	Winnipeg Goldeyes	Northern League	Al Kubski
D	Dothan Cardinals	Alabama–Florida League	Chase Riddle
D	Johnson City Cardinals	Appalachian League	Wayne Wallace
D	Sanford Cardinals	Florida State League	Dan Keith and Mario Mauriello
D	Hazlehurst-Baxley Cardinals	Georgia State League	Samuel Goodsoozian
D	Albany Cardinals	Georgia–Florida League	J. C. Dunn
D	Paducah Chiefs	KITTY League	Homer Ray Wilson
D	Decatur Commodores	Mississippi–Ohio Valley League	Al Unser
D	Hamilton Cardinals	PONY League	Ed Lyons
D	Ardmore Cardinals	Sooner State League	Frank Mancuso

LEAGUE CHAMPIONS: Rochester, Fresno, Paducah, Hamilton; LEAGUE CO-CHAMPIONS: Johnson City
