= Roy Smalley =

Roy Smalley may refer to:

- Roy Smalley Jr. (1926–2011), American baseball player, father of Roy Smalley III
- Roy Smalley III (born 1952), American baseball player, son of Roy Smalley Jr.
