= John Easton (baseball) =

American baseball player (1933-2001)

- Pinch hitter/Pinch runner
- Born: March 4, 1933; Trenton, New Jersey, U.S.
- Died: July 28, 2001 (aged 68); Princeton, New Jersey, U.S.
- Batted: Right Threw: Right

MLB debut
- June 19, 1955, for the Philadelphia Phillies

Last MLB appearance
- April 26, 1959, for the Philadelphia Phillies

MLB statistics
- At bats: 3
- Hits: 0
- Runs scored: 0
- Stats at Baseball Reference

Teams
- Philadelphia Phillies (1955; 1959)

John David Easton (March 4, 1933 – July 28, 2001) was an American professional baseball player. He signed with the Philadelphia Phillies after graduating from Princeton University and appeared in four Major League Baseball (MLB) games — one as a pinch runner in 1955 and three as a pinch hitter in 1959 — all for the Phillies. Easton went hitless in three at bats and failed to score a run as a baserunner. He threw and batted right-handed, standing 6 feet 2 inches (1.88 m) tall and weighing 185 pounds (84 kg), during his playing days.

Easton graduated from Trenton Central High School and was a member of Princeton's Class of 1955. He also played varsity basketball for the Tigers and captained their baseball team.

Easton made his MLB debut only days after signing his first pro contract, pinch running for veteran catcher Andy Seminick in the second inning of the first game of a doubleheader, against the Chicago Cubs, at Wrigley Field. Easton was not able to advance from second base when the Phils' rally was snuffed out by an inning-ending double play. However, Marv Blaylock, who had replaced Easton in the lineup, would score the only run of the game, thirteen innings later, as the Phillies won, 1–0.

Easton did not play in 1956 and much of 1957, serving in the United States Navy, but had an all-star year in 1958 for the Class A Williamsport Grays of the Eastern League, winning the batting title (.321), with 152 hits, including 35 doubles, ten triples, and 13 home runs. That earned him a second stint with the Phillies, to start the 1959 campaign, but in three pinch hitting appearances, Easton struck out all three times. He was sent back to the minor leagues, and retired after the 1959 season.

Easton graduated with a degree in electrical engineering from Princeton and became a manager for Public Service Electric & Gas Company (P S E & G) (a public utility), retiring in 1995. A resident of Hopewell Township, Mercer County, New Jersey, he died at age 68 after battling melanoma on July 28, 2001.
