= 1955 New York Giants (MLB) season =

1955 New York Giants
- League: National League
- Ballpark: Polo Grounds
- City: New York City
- Record: 80–74 (.519)
- League place: 3rd
- Owners: Horace Stoneham
- General managers: Chub Feeney
- Managers: Leo Durocher
- Television: WPIX (Russ Hodges, Bob DeLaney)
- Radio: WMCA (Russ Hodges, Bob DeLaney)

The 1955 New York Giants season was the franchise's 73rd season. The team finished in third place in the National League with an 80–74 record, 18 1/2 games behind the Brooklyn Dodgers. The season ended with the Phillies turning a triple play with the winning run at home plate.

== Offseason ==
- Prior to 1955 season: Marshall Bridges was acquired from the Giants by the Milwaukee Braves.

== Regular season ==
=== Season standings ===
National League
Team	W	L	Pct.	GB	Home	Road
Brooklyn Dodgers	98	55	.641	—	56‍–‍21	42‍–‍34
Milwaukee Braves	85	69	.552	13½	46‍–‍31	39‍–‍38
New York Giants	80	74	.519	18½	44‍–‍35	36‍–‍39
Philadelphia Phillies	77	77	.500	21½	46‍–‍31	31‍–‍46
Cincinnati Redlegs	75	79	.487	23½	46‍–‍31	29‍–‍48
Chicago Cubs	72	81	.471	26	43‍–‍33	29‍–‍48
St. Louis Cardinals	68	86	.442	30½	41‍–‍36	27‍–‍50
Pittsburgh Pirates	60	94	.390	38½	36‍–‍39	24‍–‍55

=== Record vs. opponents ===
1955 National League record Sources:
Team	BRO	CHC	CIN	MIL	NYG	PHI	PIT	STL
Brooklyn	—	14–7–1	12–10	15–7	13–9	16–6	14–8	14–8
Chicago	7–14–1	—	11–11	7–15	12–10	10–12	11–11	14–8
Cincinnati	10–12	11–11	—	9–13	9–13	11–11	14–8	11–11
Milwaukee	7–15	15–7	13–9	—	14–8	14–8	11–11	11–11
New York	9–13	10–12	13–9	8–14	—	10–12	17–5	13–9
Philadelphia	6–16	12–10	11–11	8–14	12–10	—	15–7	13–9
Pittsburgh	8–14	11–11	8–14	11–11	5–17	7–15	—	10–12
St. Louis	8–14	8–14	11–11	11–11	9–13	9–13	12–10	—

=== Roster ===
1955 New York Giants
Roster
Pitchers: 43 Johnny Antonelli; 39 Pete Burnside; 34,41 Al Corwin; 31 Paul Giel; 28 Rubén Gómez; 42 Marv Grissom; 21 Jim Hearn; 37 Don Liddle; 35 Sal Maglie; 40 Windy McCall; 34,41 Ramón Monzant; 30 George Spencer; 49 Hoyt Wilhelm	Catchers: 7 Mickey Grasso; 8 Ray Katt; 9 Wes Westrum; Infielders: 12 Joey Amalfitano; 18 Foster Castleman; 19 Alvin Dark; 15 Billy Gardner; 30 Sid Gordon; 15 Gail Harris; 14 Bobby Hofman; 34 Wayne Terwilliger; 16 Hank Thompson; 10 Davey Williams	Outfielders: 10 Gil Coan; 20 Monte Irvin; 25 Whitey Lockman; 24 Willie Mays; 22 Don Mueller; 26 Dusty Rhodes; 27 Bill Taylor	Manager: 2 Leo Durocher; Coaches: 6 Fred Fitzsimmons; 3 Herman Franks; 1 Frank Shellenback

== Player stats ==
=== Batting ===
==== Starters by position ====
Note: Pos = Position; G = Games played; AB = At bats; H = Hits; Avg. = Batting average; HR = Home runs; RBI = Runs batted in

Pos	Player	G	AB	H	Avg.	HR	RBI
C	Ray Katt	124	326	70	.215	7	28
1B	Gail Harris	79	263	61	.232	12	36
2B	Wayne Terwilliger	80	257	66	.257	1	18
3B	Hank Thompson	135	432	106	.245	17	63
SS	Alvin Dark	115	475	134	.282	9	45
LF	Whitey Lockman	147	576	157	.273	15	49
CF	Willie Mays	152	580	185	.319	51	127
RF	Don Mueller	147	605	185	.306	8	83

==== Other batters ====
Note: G = Games played; AB = At bats; H = Hits; Avg. = Batting average; HR = Home runs; RBI = Runs batted in

Player	G	AB	H	Avg.	HR	RBI
Davey Williams	82	247	62	.251	4	15
Bobby Hofman	96	207	55	.266	10	28
Dusty Rhodes	94	187	57	.305	6	32
Billy Gardner	59	187	38	.203	3	17
Monte Irvin	51	150	38	.253	1	17
Sid Gordon	66	144	35	.243	7	25
Wes Westrum	69	137	29	.212	4	18
Bill Taylor	65	64	17	.266	4	12
Foster Castleman	15	28	6	.214	2	4
Joey Amalfitano	36	22	5	.227	0	1
Gil Coan	9	13	2	.154	0	0
Mickey Grasso	8	2	0	.000	0	0

=== Pitching ===
==== Starting pitchers ====
Note: G = Games pitched; IP = Innings pitched; W = Wins; L = Losses; ERA = Earned run average; SO = Strikeouts

Player	G	IP	W	L	ERA	SO
Johnny Antonelli	38	235.1	14	16	3.33	143
Jim Hearn	39	226.2	14	16	3.73	86
Rubén Gómez	33	185.1	9	10	4.56	79
Sal Maglie	23	129.2	9	5	3.75	71
Pete Burnside	2	12.2	1	0	2.84	2

==== Other pitchers ====
Note: G = Games pitched; IP = Innings pitched; W = Wins; L = Losses; ERA = Earned run average; SO = Strikeouts

Player	G	IP	W	L	ERA	SO
Don Liddle	33	106.1	10	4	4.23	56
Ramón Monzant	28	94.2	4	8	3.99	54

==== Relief pitchers ====
Note: G = Games pitched; W = Wins; L = Losses; SV = Saves; ERA = Earned run average; SO = Strikeouts

Player	G	W	L	SV	ERA	SO
Marv Grissom	55	5	4	8	2.92	49
Hoyt Wilhelm	59	4	1	0	3.93	71
Windy McCall	42	6	5	3	3.69	50
Paul Giel	34	4	4	0	3.39	47
Al Corwin	13	0	1	0	4.01	13
George Spencer	1	0	0	0	5.40	0

== Awards and honors ==
- Alvin Dark, Lou Gehrig Memorial Award

== Farm system ==
Level	Team	League	Manager
AAA	Minneapolis Millers	American Association	Bill Rigney
AA	Dallas Eagles	Texas League	Red Davis
A	Wilkes-Barre Barons/ Johnstown Johnnies	Eastern League	Mike McCormick
A	Sioux City Soos	Western League	John Davenport
B	Danville Leafs	Carolina League	Andy Gilbert
C	El Dorado Oilers	Cotton States League	Salty Parker
C	St. Cloud Rox	Northern League	Charlie Fox
D	Sandersville Giants	Georgia State League	Pete Pavlick
D	Mayfield Clothiers	KITTY League	Dave Garcia
D	Muskogee Giants	Sooner State League	Richie Klaus

LEAGUE CHAMPIONS: Minneapolis, Danville, St. Cloud; LEAGUE CO-CHAMPIONS: Sandersville
Wilkes-Barre franchise transferred to Johnstown and renamed, July 1, 1955
