= Andy Seminick =

American baseball player (1920–2004)

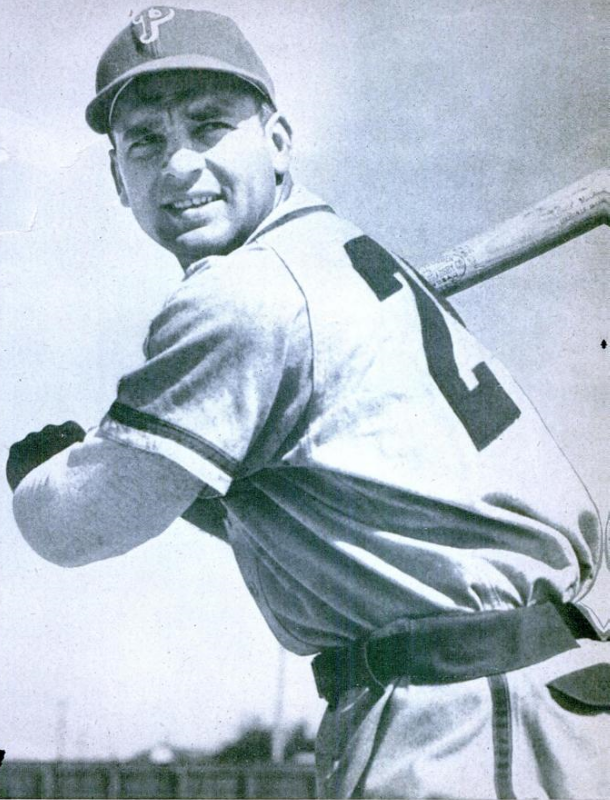
- Seminick in 1947
- Catcher
- Born: September 12, 1920; Pierce, West Virginia, U.S.
- Died: February 22, 2004 (aged 83); Palm Bay, Florida, U.S.
- Batted: Right Threw: Right

MLB debut
- September 14, 1943, for the Philadelphia Phillies

Last MLB appearance
- September 21, 1957, for the Philadelphia Phillies

MLB statistics
- Batting average: .243
- Home runs: 164
- Runs batted in: 556
- Stats at Baseball Reference

Teams
- Philadelphia Phillies (1943–1951); Cincinnati Reds / Redlegs (1952–1955); Philadelphia Phillies (1955–1957)

Career highlights and awards
- All-Star (1949)

Andrew Wasal Seminick (September 12, 1920 – February 22, 2004) was an American professional baseball player. He played in Major League Baseball as a catcher for the Philadelphia Phillies between 1943 and 1951, and the Cincinnati Reds/Redlegs from 1952 through part of 1955, when he rejoined the Phillies for the rest of his career until his release at the end of the 1957 season. Seminick was an integral part of the 1950 "Whiz Kids" Phillies team that won their first pennant since 1915.

== Playing career ==
Seminick was born in Pierce, West Virginia to Lemko immigrant parents, but moved to Muse, Pennsylvania when Andy was two. His father was a Rusyn from Żegiestów in Nowy Sacz County. He was contracted as an amateur free agent in 1941 by the Pittsburgh Pirates. Seminick led the Appalachian League in 1942 with 15 home runs and 202 total bases, and was among the league leaders in batting average. In 1943, he had a .303 batting average with the Knoxville Smokies of the Class-A Southern Association, and was purchased by the Philadelphia Phillies.

At the age of 23, Seminick made his major league debut on September 14, 1943. By 1945, the Phillies were using Seminick in a platoon system alongside veteran catcher Gus Mancuso. While he could hit for power, his defensive skills were below average, as he led the National League in errors in 1946, 1948 and 1949. Phillies manager Eddie Sawyer assigned Phillies coach and former catcher Cy Perkins to tutor him, which helped improve his defensive skills. He was voted by baseball fans to be the starting catcher for the National League in the 1949 All-Star Game, mostly for his reputation as a hitter.

On June 2, 1949, the Phillies hit five home runs during the eighth inning in a 12–3 victory over Cincinnati at Shibe Park, tying the major league mark set by the 1939 New York Giants. Seminick hit two home runs in the inning, while Del Ennis, Willie Jones and Schoolboy Rowe had one each. Jones added a triple as Granny Hamner's double jumped the extra bases total to 18, still a record. Seminick collected three home runs overall.

With his defensive and pitch calling skills improved, Seminick played an important leadership role during the 1950 "Whiz Kids" championship season. Because he was, at 29, one of the veterans on the squad and was called upon to handle a young Phillie pitching staff, Philadelphia baseball writers nicknamed Seminick "Grandpa Whiz."

On August 12, 1950, in a game against the Giants, Seminick became irritated after Eddie Stanky repeatedly waved his arms while Seminick was batting. Stanky was eventually ejected from the game, but Seminick took out his frustrations on Bill Rigney, Stanky's replacement at second base. After he reached base on an error in the fourth inning, he slid hard into second base, crashing into Rigney and causing him to fall over. A nearly ten-minute brawl erupted between the teams, which required police intervention and resulted in the ejection of Seminick and Rigney from the game. The Phillies went on to win 4–3.

Seminick enjoyed his best season in 1950, hitting for a .288 batting average with 24 home runs and 68 runs batted in. Seminick broke his ankle late in the season, but continued to play with the injury until the Phillies lost to the New York Yankees in the World Series. Future Hall of Fame pitcher, Robin Roberts said of Seminick,"If you had to pick a guy in the clubhouse who was our leader that year, it would be Andy. He always played hard, and that was his best year by far".

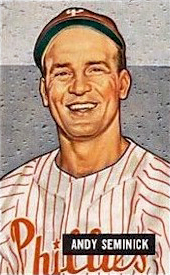
Seminick in 1951

In 1951, Seminick was beaned by a Max Lanier fastball, diminishing his ability to play. He was traded to the Cincinnati Reds for catcher Smoky Burgess, playing there from 1952 until the early part of the 1955 season. In 1955, he was once again traded for Burgess, returning to the Phillies, where he led National League catchers with a .994 fielding percentage. He played two more years before ending his playing career at the age of 36 after the 1957 season.

== Career statistics ==
In a 15-year major league career, Seminick played in 1,304 games, totaling 953 hits in 3,921 at bats for a .243 batting average, with 164 home runs and 556 runs batted in. He threw out 44.6% of the base runners who tried steal a base on him, 16th on the all-time list. Seminick led National League catchers twice in baserunners caught stealing and once each in putouts, assists and fielding percentage. At the time of his retirement, he ranked seventh all-time in home runs by catchers.

== Managing and coaching career ==
After retiring as a player, Seminick worked for the Philadelphia organization for the rest of his life. He was a coach with the Phillies (1957–58, 1967–69) and manager of 11 minor-league affiliates (1959–66, 1970–73). After that, he served as a scout and as a roving minor-league instructor for the Phillies (1974–mid-1980s). Notably, ninety of the players he managed or coached eventually played in the major leagues, including Mike Schmidt, Ferguson Jenkins, Greg Luzinski and Bob Boone. Seminick helped to convert Boone from a third baseman to one of the best defensive catchers in baseball.

In the 1990s, Seminick served as a catching instructor for Philadelphia in spring training and in the Florida Instructional League.

Andy Seminick died in Palm Bay, Florida, at 83 years of age.
