= Bert Hamric =

American baseball player (1928–1984)

- Pinch hitter
- Born: March 1, 1928; Sand Fork, West Virginia, US
- Died: August 8, 1984 (aged 56); Springboro, Ohio, US
- Batted: Left Threw: Right

MLB debut
- April 24, 1955, for the Brooklyn Dodgers

Last MLB appearance
- May 26, 1958, for the Baltimore Orioles

MLB statistics
- Batting Average: .111
- Home Runs: 0
- RBI: 0
- Stats at Baseball Reference

Teams
- Brooklyn Dodgers (1955); Baltimore Orioles (1958)

Odbert Herman Hamric (March 1, 1928 – August 8, 1984) was an American professional baseball player from 1949 to 1961. An outfielder in minor league baseball, the native of Clarksburg, West Virginia, appeared in ten Major League games as a pinch hitter: two games for the 1955 Brooklyn Dodgers and eight for the 1958 Baltimore Orioles.

Hamric batted left-handed, threw right-handed, stood 6 feet (1.8 m) tall and weighed 165 pounds (75 kg).

He died at age 56 in Springboro, Ohio.
