= The Sporting News Player of the Year Award =

The Sporting News Player of the Year Award refers to a set of awards given to the player of the year in various sports as adjudged by The Sporting News:

Awards include:

- The Sporting News College Football Player of the Year, beginning in 1942
- The Sporting News Men's College Basketball Player of the Year, beginning in 1942
- The Sporting News Minor League Player of the Year Award, minor league baseball from 1936 to 2007
- The Sporting News MLB Player of the Year Award, Major League Baseball beginning in 1936
- The Sporting News NFL Player of the Year Award, National Football League beginning in 1954
