= Jack Meyer =

American baseball player (1932-1967)

- Pitcher
- Born: March 23, 1932; Philadelphia, Pennsylvania, U.S.
- Died: March 6, 1967 (aged 34); Philadelphia, Pennsylvania, U.S.
- Batted: Right Threw: Right

MLB debut
- April 16, 1955, for the Philadelphia Phillies

Last MLB appearance
- April 30, 1961, for the Philadelphia Phillies

MLB statistics
- Win–loss record: 24–34
- Earned run average: 3.92
- Strikeouts: 375
- Stats at Baseball Reference

Teams
- Philadelphia Phillies (1955–1961)

John Robert Meyer (March 23, 1932 – March 6, 1967) was an American professional baseball right-handed pitcher, who appeared in all or parts of seven Major League (MLB) seasons (1955–1961) with the Philadelphia Phillies.

== Early life ==
Born in Philadelphia, Meyer came from a '"well-to-do New Jersey family," was educated at the exclusive William Penn Charter School, and attended the University of Delaware and Wake Forest University. During his playing days, he was listed at 6 feet 1 inch (1.85 m) tall, weighing 175 pounds (79 kg).

== Baseball career ==
Meyer signed with the Phillies in 1951 and steadily rose through their farm system, winning 15 games for the 1954 Syracuse Chiefs of the Triple-A International League (IL). His most successful MLB season was his 1955 rookie campaign, when he led the National League (NL) in both saves (16) and games finished (36), while fanning 97 batters in 110 1/3 innings pitched. Meyer also made five starts, and wound up finishing second to Bill Virdon in NL Rookie-of-the-Year Award balloting. However, Meyer’s effectiveness then began to fade and he spent part of 1957 back in Triple-A.

Meyer rebounded to post respectable seasons in both 1958 and 1959, largely in middle relief, but his career was negatively affected by his growing reputation as a drinker and late-night carouser. Nicknamed "The Bird," he was a member — along with fellow pitchers Turk Farrell and Jim Owens — of the so-called "Dalton Gang", who received notoriety around baseball for multiple, and well-publicized, off-field incidents.

Meyer went on the disabled list with a herniated disk and was fined $1,200 (nine percent of his salary) after a bout of post-game drinking in Pittsburgh in May 1960. The evening ended with Meyer confronting two sportswriters and Phillies' broadcaster Byrum Saam, then fighting with Farrell and several teammates. Meyer's resulting back injury caused him to miss the remainder of the 1960 season. He only pitched in one more game, in 1961: a relief appearance in which he surrendered two earned runs in two innings pitched against the St. Louis Cardinals on April 30, before leaving baseball.

For his MLB career, Meyer compiled a 24–34 record, with 21 saves and four complete games, in 202 appearances, 178 of them as a relief pitcher, with a 3.92 earned run average (ERA), and 375 strikeouts. In 455 career innings pitched, he allowed 385 hits and 244 bases on balls.

== Death and legacy ==
Meyer suffered a heart attack while watching a basketball game on television and died on March 6, 1967, at Thomas Jefferson University Hospital in Philadelphia. Only 34 years old, he had a history of heart problems. Meyer left a wife and three children.

His nephew, Brian Meyer, pitched briefly in MLB, for the Houston Astros, from 1988 to 1990.

== See also ==
- List of Major League Baseball annual saves leaders
