= Fred Van Dusen =

American baseball player (1937–2018)

- Pinch hitter
- Born: July 31, 1937; Jackson Heights, New York, U.S.
- Died: June 1, 2018 (aged 80); Franklin, Tennessee, U.S.
- Batted: Left Threw: Left

MLB debut
- September 11, 1955, for the Philadelphia Phillies

Last MLB appearance
- September 11, 1955, for the Philadelphia Phillies

MLB statistics
- Games played: 1
- Plate appearances: 1
- Hit by pitch: 1
- Stats at Baseball Reference

Teams
- Philadelphia Phillies (1955)

Frederick William Van Dusen (July 31, 1937 – June 1, 2018) was an American Major League Baseball player. Van Dusen played for Philadelphia Phillies during the 1955 season, when he was 18 years old.

An outfielder by trade, out of William Cullen Bryant High School, Van Dusen was signed by the Phillies in August 1955 as a bonus baby, meaning he had to be kept on the Phillies' 40-man roster for two years. During his first month with the team, he appeared just once, pinch hitting in the second game of a doubleheader against the Milwaukee Braves on September 11, 1955 at County Stadium. In the ninth inning, with the Phillies down 9-1, he pinch hit for pitcher Lynn Lovenguth against Humberto Robinson and was hit by a pitch. While Van Dusen never appeared in another major league game, he did continue to play in the Phillies minor league organization until 1961 before retiring.

Van Dusen divorced his first wife, with whom he had three children, after his baseball career ended. He later remarried and became an insurance agent based in New York.
