= Pierce, West Virginia =

Pierce
- Unincorporated community
- Location within the state of West Virginia Pierce (the United States)
- Coordinates: 39°10′25″N 79°30′37″W
- Country: United States
- State: West Virginia
- County: Tucker
- Elevation: 2,999 ft (914 m)
- Time zone: UTC-5 (Eastern (EST))
  - Summer (DST): UTC-4 (EDT)
- GNIS ID: 1555342

Pierce is an unincorporated community and coal town in Tucker County, West Virginia, United States.

The community was named after one Mr. Pierce, a railroad official.
