= Jack Moran (broadcaster) =

American sports commentator (1920 – 1997)

Moran

John Daniel Moran (August 18, 1920 – January 14, 1997) was an American sports commentator who worked on television and radio in the Cincinnati, Ohio, market during five decades spanning 1946 and 1982. Born in nearby Newport, Kentucky, he was a United States Army Air Forces veteran of World War II.

Moran began his radio career at Newport's WNOP (AM) in 1946. In 1955, he became a member of the Cincinnati Reds radio and TV announcing team on WSAI and WCPO-TV, starting a seven-year, on-air partnership with #1 announcer and Baseball Hall of Fame former pitcher Waite Hoyt. In 1961, his final season in the Reds' booth, Moran and Hoyt described games for Cincinnati's National League champions on WLW radio.

That year, Moran also became sports director of WCPO-TV, then Cincinnati's CBS affiliate, holding the position into 1982. He was succeeded on the Reds' radio team by Gene Kelly, former Philadelphia Phillies announcer, in 1962.

During his 22 years as a sports anchor for WCPO-TV, Moran was noted for wearing plaid sports jackets on the air, and he hosted the bowling program BPA King of Bowling. After retiring from television, Moran opened a talent agency.

He died in Hamilton County, Ohio, in 1997, aged 76, and is interred in Cincinnati's Vine Street Hill Cemetery.
