= Jim Westlake =

American baseball player (1930-2003)

- Pinch hitter
- Born: July 3, 1930; Sacramento, California, U.S.
- Died: January 3, 2003 (aged 72); Sacramento, California, U.S.
- Batted: Left Threw: Left

MLB debut
- April 16, 1955, for the Philadelphia Phillies

Last MLB appearance
- April 16, 1955, for the Philadelphia Phillies

MLB statistics
- Games played: 1
- At bats: 1
- Hits: 0
- Stats at Baseball Reference

Teams
- Philadelphia Phillies (1955)

James Patrick Westlake (July 3, 1930 – January 3, 2003) was an American Major League Baseball player. Westlake played for the Philadelphia Phillies in 1955. In one game, Westlake had no hits in one career at-bat. He batted and threw left-handed. His brother is former player Wally Westlake.

== Baseball career ==
Jim graduated from C. K. McClatchy High School in Sacramento, California in 1948. He had one at bat for the Philadelphia Phillies on April 16, 1955 at the Polo Grounds in New York City against the Giants. Westlake entered the game as a pinch-hitter in the top of the ninth inning as the first batter hitting for relief pitcher Jack Spring. Jim Hearn was the pitcher for the Giants and struck out Westlake in his only Major League at-bat.

Westlake was born and died in Sacramento, California.
