= Ron Mrozinski =

American baseball player (1930-2005)

- Pitcher
- Born: September 16, 1930; White Haven, Pennsylvania, U.S.
- Died: October 19, 2005 (aged 75); Washington, New Jersey, U.S.
- Batted: Right Threw: Left

MLB debut
- June 20, 1954, for the Philadelphia Phillies

Last MLB appearance
- September 9, 1955, for the Philadelphia Phillies

MLB statistics
- Win–loss record: 1–3
- Earned run average: 5.36
- Strikeouts: 44
- Stats at Baseball Reference

Teams
- Philadelphia Phillies (1954–1955)

Ronald Frank Mrozinski (September 16, 1930 – October 19, 2005) was an American professional baseball player, a pitcher who played in 37 Major League Baseball games over two seasons, 1954 and 1955, for the Philadelphia Phillies. His professional career spanned fourteen years, from 1949 until 1962. Born in White Haven, Pennsylvania, he threw left-handed, batted right-handed, and was listed as 5 feet 11 inches (1.80 m) tall and 160 pounds (73 kg).

Mrozinski came up through the Phillies' organization, registering double figures in wins during each of his first four pro seasons. Recalled from Triple-A Syracuse in the middle of 1954, he got into 15 games for the Phils, four as a starter, and split two decisions with a 4.50 earned run average in 48 innings pitched. He threw one complete game; ironically, it was the game he lost, 5–2, on September 14 against the St. Louis Cardinals at Connie Mack Stadium. Mrozinski had held the Cards to two runs into the eighth inning before giving up back-to-back home runs to Red Schoendienst (a two-run job) and Rip Repulski. Ten days later, Mrozinski earned his only big-league win, going 62/3 innings against the eventual world champion New York Giants. In that game, Mrozinski left with a 4–2 lead, and was relieved by a Baseball Hall of Famer, Robin Roberts, who shut down the Giants for the remainder of the game to earn a save.

In 1955, he appeared in 22 games for Philadelphia, making only one start, and was winless in two decisions. He did, however, earn his only MLB save that year when he preserved a 10–8 victory over the Cardinals on June 21. The 1955 campaign was Mrozinski's only full year and his last season on a big-league roster. In his 37 games and 821/3 innings pitched, he allowed 87 hits and 44 bases on balls; he also struck out 44. Returning to the minors in 1957, he racked up four more years with double-digit victories, and won 119 games overall before retiring from the game.

Ron Mrozinski died at his home in Washington, New Jersey.

== Sources ==
- Career statistics from Baseball Reference · Baseball Reference (Minors) · Retrosheet · Baseball Almanac
- Retrosheet
