= Ron Negray =

American baseball player (1930–2018)

- Pitcher
- Born: February 26, 1930; Akron, Ohio, U.S.
- Died: November 8, 2018 (aged 88); Akron, Ohio, U.S.
- Batted: Right Threw: Right

MLB debut
- September 14, 1952, for the Brooklyn Dodgers

Last MLB appearance
- May 9, 1958, for the Los Angeles Dodgers

MLB statistics
- Win–loss record: 6–6
- Earned run average: 4.04
- Strikeouts: 81
- Stats at Baseball Reference

Teams
- Brooklyn Dodgers (1952); Philadelphia Phillies (1955–1956); Los Angeles Dodgers (1958)

Ronald Alvin Negray (February 26, 1930 – November 8, 2018) was an American professional baseball player. A right-handed pitcher, he appeared in 66 games in Major League Baseball over four seasons between 1952 and 1958 for the Brooklyn / Los Angeles Dodgers and Philadelphia Phillies. The native of Akron, Ohio, was listed as 6 feet 1 inch (1.85 m) tall and 185 pounds (84 kg). He graduated from Garfield High School and attended Kent State University.

== Baseball career ==
=== Early years with Brooklyn ===
Negray began his 15-year pro career in 1949 in the Brooklyn farm system, winning 21 games in the Class D Georgia–Florida League. His first taste of MLB service came at the tail end of the 1952 campaign, when the pennant-bound Dodgers recalled him from the Triple-A St. Paul Saints. Negray got into four games pitched, including one start, and allowed 15 hits and five earned runs in 13 full innings pitched. He then spent 21/2 more years with St. Paul, winning 17 games for the Saints in 1954. On June 7, 1955, he was recalled by the Dodgers and traded to the Phillies for fellow pitcher Dave Cole.

=== Philadelphia Phillies ===
Inserted into the Phils' starting rotation, Negray hurled seven shutout innings on June 19 against the Chicago Cubs at Wrigley Field, surrendering only four hits and one base on balls before departing in the eighth inning. (The Phillies would go on to win 1–0 in 15 innings.) Negray was less effective in his next start five days later, permitting 11 hits and five earned runs in seven innings against the Cincinnati Redlegs at Crosley Field, but the Phillies outscored Cincinnati 8–6 to deliver Negray's first big-league win. In his third start on June 29, Negray notched his first complete game in MLB, defeating the Pittsburgh Pirates 6–3 at Connie Mack Stadium, giving up only two earned runs. He threw his second and last complete game two months later, defeating the Redlegs at Connie Mack Stadium, 8–3. All told, in his half-season with the Phillies, Negray won four of seven decisions in 19 games almost evenly split between starting and relieving.

The following year, 1956, was Negray's only full season in the majors. He worked in 39 games, all but four of them in relief, and earned three saves out of the Phillie bullpen. He posted a 2–3 record and his earned run average rose from 3.52 to 4.19.

=== Return to the Dodgers ===
During spring training in 1957, he was traded back to the Dodgers in a six-player transaction that brought shortstop Humberto "Chico" Fernández to Philadelphia. The Dodgers, playing their final season in Brooklyn, sent Negray back to St. Paul for the remainder of 1957. Negray was destined to be a member of the first edition of the Los Angeles Dodgers, however.

On March 8, 1958, he was the starting pitcher in the franchise's first spring training game as representatives of Los Angeles, a 7–4 loss to the Phillies at Miami Stadium. Then, after making the Dodgers' 28-man early-season roster, he appeared in the first regular National League game in Los Angeles Dodger history on April 15 at Seals Stadium, as the Dodgers fell to the San Francisco Giants, 8–0. In that game, he allowed one earned run in two innings of mop-up relief. Three more relief appearances followed before Negray returned to the minor leagues for the rest of his career in May 1958. In 1960, he was on the Toronto Maple Leafs who went 100–54. His record was 10–6. The team featured, among other players, Sparky Anderson and Chuck Tanner, who would later become major league managers. He played for the Maple Leafs from 1960 to 1962. He played for the Hawaii Islanders in 1963.

== Statistics and later years ==
In the majors, he split 12 decisions and posted a career earned run average of 4.04 in 66 games, including 15 starts. He allowed 170 hits and 57 bases on balls in 1622/3 innings pitched, posting two complete games, three saves, no shutouts, and 81 strikeouts. He won 113 games in minor league baseball, including 58 during all or parts of six seasons with the St. Paul Saints. After his baseball career, he resided in New Franklin, Ohio, and become a salesman of athletics equipment.
