= Chuck Templeton (baseball) =

American baseball player (1932–1997)

- Pitcher
- Born: June 1, 1932; Detroit, Michigan
- Died: October 9, 1997 (aged 65); Irving, Texas
- Batted: Right Threw: Left

MLB debut
- September 9, 1955, for the Brooklyn Dodgers

Last MLB appearance
- June 10, 1956, for the Brooklyn Dodgers

MLB statistics
- Record: 0-2
- Earned run average: 7.71
- Strikeouts: 11
- Stats at Baseball Reference

Teams
- Brooklyn Dodgers (1955–1956)

Charles Sherman Templeton (June 1, 1932 – October 9, 1997) was a pitcher in Major League Baseball. He pitched from 1955 to 1956 with the Brooklyn Dodgers.

His career was cut short due to an arm injury which took away the blazing fastball he had early in his career.

He died at the age of 65
