= John Edelman =

American baseball player (1935–2026)

- Pitcher
- Born: July 27, 1935; Philadelphia, Pennsylvania, U.S.
- Died: April 9, 2026 (aged 90); West Chester, Pennsylvania, U.S.
- Batted: Right Threw: Right

MLB debut
- June 2, 1955, for the Milwaukee Braves

Last MLB appearance
- September 21, 1955, for the Milwaukee Braves

MLB statistics
- Win–loss record: 0–0
- Earned run average: 11.12
- Strikeouts: 3
- Innings pitched: 5 2/3
- Stats at Baseball Reference

Teams
- Milwaukee Braves (1955)

John Rogers Edelman (July 27, 1935 – April 9, 2026) was an American Major League Baseball pitcher. Edelman signed with the Milwaukee Braves as a bonus baby free agent in 1955 and played with the team that year.

Edelman played at the collegiate level at West Chester University. He stood 6 feet 3 inches (1.91 m) tall and weighed 185 pounds (84 kg).

Edelman died on April 9, 2026, at the age of 90.
