= Herm Wehmeier =

American baseball player (1927–1973)

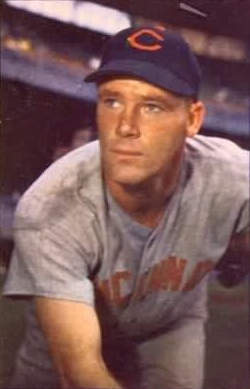
- Wehmeier, c. 1953
- Pitcher
- Born: February 18, 1927; Cincinnati, Ohio, U.S.
- Died: May 21, 1973 (aged 46); Dallas, Texas, U.S.
- Batted: Right Threw: Right

MLB debut
- September 7, 1945, for the Cincinnati Reds

Last MLB appearance
- July 23, 1958, for the Detroit Tigers

MLB statistics
- Win–loss record: 92–108
- Earned run average: 4.80
- Strikeouts: 794
- Stats at Baseball Reference

Teams
- Cincinnati Reds / Redlegs (1945, 1947–1954); Philadelphia Phillies (1954–1956); St. Louis Cardinals (1956–1958); Detroit Tigers (1958)

Herman Ralph Wehmeier (February 18, 1927 – May 21, 1973) was an American professional baseball player, a right-handed pitcher for the Cincinnati Reds (1945 and 1947–54), Philadelphia Phillies (1954–56), St. Louis Cardinals (1956–58) and Detroit Tigers (1958). Wehmeier stood 6 feet 2 inches (188 cm) tall and weighed 185 pounds (84 kg; 13.2 st). He was born in Cincinnati, and died in Dallas, Texas due to a heart attack, at the age of 46, while he was testifying in an embezzlement trial.

Wehmeier attended Western Hills High School (Cincinnati, Ohio). Signed by the Cincinnati Reds out of high school, he went on to play 13 years in the major leagues.

He led the National League in Walks Allowed in 1949 (117), 1950 (135) and 1952 (103). He led the NL in Earned Runs Allowed (145) in 1950. He led the NL in Wild Pitches in 1949 (7) and 1950 (11). He led the NL in Hit Batsmen (7) in 1952. In 13 seasons he had a 92–108 Win–loss record, 240 Games Started, 79 Complete Games, 9 Shutouts, 9 Saves, 1,803 Innings Pitched, 794 Strikeouts, and a 4.80 ERA. As a hitter, he posted a .196 batting average (124-for-633) with 67 runs, 3 home runs and 40 RBIs.
