= Smoky Burgess =

American baseball player (1927–1991)

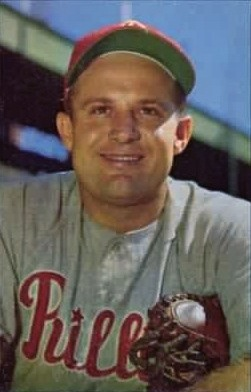
- Burgess, c. 1953
- Catcher
- Born: February 6, 1927; Caroleen, North Carolina, U.S.
- Died: September 15, 1991 (aged 64); Rutherfordton, North Carolina, U.S.
- Batted: Left Threw: Right

MLB debut
- April 19, 1949, for the Chicago Cubs

Last MLB appearance
- October 1, 1967, for the Chicago White Sox

MLB statistics
- Batting average: .295
- Home runs: 126
- Runs batted in: 673
- Stats at Baseball Reference

Teams
- Chicago Cubs (1949, 1951); Philadelphia Phillies (1952–1955); Cincinnati Reds (1955–1958); Pittsburgh Pirates (1959–1964); Chicago White Sox (1964–1967)

Career highlights and awards
- 9× All-Star (1954, 1955, 1959–1961², 1964); World Series champion (1960); Cincinnati Reds Hall of Fame

Forrest Harrill "Smoky" Burgess (February 6, 1927 – September 15, 1991) was an American professional baseball catcher, pinch hitter, coach, and scout, who played in Major League Baseball (MLB) from 1949 to 1967. Burgess was selected as an All-Star in six seasons (being on the National League (NL) team for nine All-Star games). He became known, later in his career, for his abilities as an elite pinch hitter, setting the MLB career record for career pinch-hits with 144. During his career, he led NL catchers in fielding percentage three times. He stood 5 feet 8 inches (1.73 m) tall, weighing 245 pounds (111 kg). Burgess batted left-handed and threw right-handed. A statue of Burgess was unveiled in his hometown on November 9, 2024.

== Early life ==
Burgess was born on February 6, 1927, in Caroleen, North Carolina, the son of Lloyd Luther Burgess and Ocie (Lewis) Burgess. Lloyd worked in textiles, and was a standout semi-professional baseball player. Burgess attended Tri-High School in Caroleen, and played baseball under coach Forrest Hunt, who had been a catcher in the New York Yankees minor league system. Hunt taught Burgess to be an aggressive hitter. He played American Legion baseball from 1942 to 1944.

When asked why Burgess was her only ball playing child, his mother explained it was because "Forrest couldn’t pick cotton like his brothers!"

== Baseball career ==
Burgess was originally signed by the St. Louis Cardinals in 1943, but Commissioner Kenesaw Mountain Landis voided the deal after Burgess was deemed to be too young. The Chicago Cubs signed him as an amateur free agent one year later.

=== Minor leagues ===
Burgess played in Minor League Baseball (MiLB) from 1944 to 1948 before he made his major league debut in the 1949 season. In 1944, he played in 54 games for the Class D Lockport Cubs, batting .325. He spent the majority of the 1945 and 1946 seasons in military service. In 1947, he led the Class B Tri-State League with a .387 batting average with the Fayetteville Cubs. Burgess followed that by leading (minimum 100 games played) the Southern Association with a .386 average, in 1948 with the Double-A Nashville Volunteers. In 1949, he played 19 games for the Triple-A Los Angeles Angels of the Pacific Coast League, batting .279 in 43 at bats. After playing in 46 games for the Chicago Cubs in 1949, in 1950, he played the season with the Triple-A Springfield Cubs of the International League, where he hit .327 in 88 games.

=== Chicago Cubs and Philadelphia Phillies ===
Burgess made his major league debut at the age of 22 with the Chicago Cubs on April 19, 1949. He played in 46 games, batting .268 in 56 at bats for the Cubs that season. He returned to the Cubs for the 1951 season, starting 49 games at catcher, and batting .251 in 219 at bats.

In early October 1951, Burgess was traded along with Bob Borkowski to the Cincinnati Reds for Johnny Pramesa and Bob Usher. On December 10, 1951, the Reds traded Burgess, Connie Ryan and Howie Fox to the Philadelphia Phillies for catcher Andy Seminick, Eddie Pellagrini, Dick Sisler and Niles Jordan, before the start of the 1952 season. With the Phillies, he platooned alongside the right-handed-hitting Stan Lopata. He started 102 games to Lopata's 52 in 1952, and led the team in hitting with a .296 batting average in 371 at bats. In 1953, he started 85 games, and hit .292 in 312 at bats. Burgess had his best season in 1954, when he had career-highs with a .368 batting average and .942 OPS (on base plus slugging) in 108 games for the Phillies, again starting 85 games; and earning his first All-Star Game selection.

=== Cincinnati Reds ===
At the beginning of the 1955 season, after playing seven games for the Phillies, Burgess was once again traded for Andy Seminick. The Phillies traded Burgess, Steve Ridzik and Stan Palys to the Cincinnati Reds for Seminick, Glen Gorbous and Jim Greengrass. In being returned to Cincinnati, Burgess finally got the chance to play every day. He rose to the occasion, hitting for a .306 batting average for the rest of the season along with 20 home runs and 77 runs batted in (RBI) gaining his second consecutive berth on the National League All-Star team. Burgess started 103 of the 116 games in which he played for the Reds that season, and had a career-high number of plate appearances in a season for any team on which he ever played (477).

On July 29, 1955, Burgess hit three home runs and had nine runs batted in during a game against the Pittsburgh Pirates, including a grand slam home run. Roberto Clemente caught a fourth long drive that Burgess hit at the right field screen at Crosley Field. He began the 1956 season as the Reds' starting catcher, but when the team faltered early in the season, Reds manager Birdie Tebbetts decided to shake things up, and replaced Burgess with a younger man, Ed Bailey. Burgess started 53 games in 1956, with a .275 batting average, 12 home runs and 39 runs batted in (RBI). Burgess said his most memorable career pinch hit came on the last day of the 1956 season, when Tebbetts asked him to hit a home run to tie the Red's all-time team home run record in a season. Burgess successfully hit a home run against the Chicago Cubs' Sad Sam Jones; the only time in his career Burgess ever went to bat with the intention of hitting a home run.

In 1957, Burgess started 42 games for the Reds, batting .283 in 205 at bats. He hit 14 home runs with 39 RBIs. In 1958, he started 53 games for the Reds, batting .283 for a second consecutive season. He had six home runs and 31 RBIs in 251 at bats. Among Burgess's Reds teammates from 1957 to 1958 was Jerry Lynch, who like Burgess would become one of Major League Baseball's greatest pinch hitters.

=== Pittsburgh Pirates ===
In 1959, Burgess was traded along with Harvey Haddix and Don Hoak to the Pittsburgh Pirates for Frank Thomas, Whammy Douglas, Jim Pendleton and John Powers. He played for the Pirates from 1959 through September 12, 1964, when his contract rights were sold to the Chicago White Sox. As a Pirate he was named to the National League All-Star team in four seasons (1959 to 1961, 1964).

In 1959, Burgess started 95 games for the Pirates. He hit .297, with 11 home runs and 59 RBIs in 377 at bats. He was the Pirates catcher on May 26, 1959 when Haddix took a perfect game into the 13th inning against the Milwaukee Braves, before losing the game. He was selected to both All-Star games in 1959. He had five hits in six at bats in an August 6, 1959 game against the St. Louis Cardinals, with a home run, two doubles and six RBIs.

In 1960, Burgess started 86 games for the Pirates, hitting .294, with seven home runs and 39 RBIs in 337 at bats. He was again selected to play in both 1960 All-Star Games. Burgess also won a World Series with the Pirates in 1960, defeating the New York Yankees. Burgess had a .333 batting average in the seven-game series, starting in Games 1, 2, 4, 5 and 7; four of which the Pirates won.

In 1961, Burgess started 83 games and had a .303 batting average with 12 home runs and 52 RBIs. He was selected to both 1961 NL All-Star Teams, and was named the starting catcher in the July 11 game. He played the entire game, with one hit in four at bats and 13 putouts. He also started the July 31 All-Star Game, but was replaced early in the game by John Roseboro. The Sporting News selected him as the catcher on its 1961 NL All-Star Team.

In 1962, he started 94 games and had a team-high .328 batting average, above future Hall of Fame right fielder Roberto Clemente's .312 average. Burgess also had 13 home runs and 61 RBIs. He felt snubbed by not being selected by his fellow NL players for the 1962 NL All-Star team, even though he was hitting .317 at the time of the voting. Between his rejection as an all-star and the first all-star game that year, he raised his average from .317 to .346.

The Pirates traded for Boston Red Sox catcher Jim Pagliaroni before the 1963 season, in November 1962. Burgess and Pagliaroni were roommates during spring training that season. Although the 36-year old Burgess was considered the team's number one catcher going into the season, by the end of the year Pagliaroni had started 78 games and Burgess 65. Burgess hit .280, with six home runs and 37 RBIs in 264 at bats; and the 26-year old Pagliarioni hit .230, with 11 home runs and 26 RBIs in 252 at bats. The Pirates also had traded for Manny Mota in early April and for Jerry Lynch in late May that season, giving the team three of the top pinch hitters in Major League history. As of early 2000, Mota was the all-time leader in career pinch hits (150), Burgess was second (145) and Lynch was sixth (116). As of April 2025, Mota was third, Burgess fourth and Lynch 11th all-time in career pinch hits.

Burgess played the majority of the 1964 season with the Pirates. He started 40 games to Pagliaroni's 95, hitting .246, with two home runs and 17 RBIs in 171 at bats. Burgess was selected to the 1964 NL All-Star Team as a reserve catcher. His contract rights were sold to the Chicago White Sox on September 12.

=== Chicago White Sox ===
In late 1964, Burgess was acquired by the Chicago White Sox, who were in the middle of a heated pennant race. In his first plate appearance with the White Sox, on September 15 against the Detroit Tigers, he hit a game-tying home run off pitcher Dave Wickersham. The White Sox eventually won the game, moving them to within one game of first place in the American League pennant race. That was his only hit in seven pinch hit appearances for the White Sox in 1964, along with two bases on balls.

Over the next three years, Burgess was used almost exclusively as a pinch hitter, appearing in just 7 games behind the plate. In 1965, he appeared in 80 games, all but five as a pinch hitter. He had 22 hits in 77 at bats, with two home runs and 24 RBIs. In 1966, he set Major League records which still stand as of 2026 for the most games in a season (79) by a non-pitcher and most times on base in a season (34) by a player who did not score a run. The 39-year-old Burgess played in two games as a catcher of the 79 games in which he appeared, batting .313 with 15 RBIs.

The White Sox released Burgess after the 1966 season ended, at Burgess's request as he planned to go home to North Carolina to work in his automobile business. However, general manager Ed Short said at the time if Burgess changed his mind about playing, he would be invited to the White Sox 1967 spring training camp; and if he was interested in coaching, the White Sox would make him a minor league batting instructor.

Burgess did rejoin the White Sox in spring training the following season, and played his final season of Major League Baseball with the White Sox in 1967. At 40-years old, Burgess appeared in 77 games, all as a pinch hitter. He had eight hits in 60 at bats, with 14 bases on balls, two home runs and 11 RBIs. He was hampered during the season by a pulled muscle in his rib cage that affected his swing. Burgess played his final major league game on October 1, 1967 at the age of 40.

=== Career statistics ===
During an 18-year major league career, Burgess played in 1,691 games, hitting for a .295 career batting average, with 126 home runs, 673 RBIs, and a .362 on-base percentage. He accumulated 1,318 career hits, with 230 doubles, and 33 triples. He walked 477 times while striking out just 270 times. He recorded a career .988 fielding percentage. Burgess batted .285 (144–505) with 16 home runs and 147 RBIs as a pinch hitter.

== Legacy and honors ==
His .295 career batting average ranked him 10th among Major League catchers, as of 2009. As of 2024 he is ranked 13th. Burgess led National League catchers in fielding percentage three times, in 1953, 1960, and 1961. Burgess was a six-time All-Star,1954 and 1955 with the Phillies, and 1959 to 1961 and 1964 with the Pirates. From 1959 to 1962, there were two All-Star games a year instead of one, so Burgess played in eight overall All-Star games. Burgess did not play in the first 1959 All-Star game (though on the team), but did play in the second, played in both game 1 and game 2 in 1960, and played in both game 1 and game 2 in 1961.

In 1973, Burgess was reported as having 144 career pinch hits. In September 1979, Manny Mota was said have tied Burgess's all-time career record of 144 pinch hits on August 7, 1979; and then broken Burgess's record with his 145th pinch hit on September 2, 1979. In 1982, Burgess was reported as having 145 career pinch hits. At the time of his death in 1991, Burgess's pinch hit total was reported as 145 career pinch hits. The Society for American Baseball Research articles on Mota and Burgess indicate Burgess's career pinch hit total is 145 hits, and so Mota actually broke the record on September 29, 1979, when he got his next (146th) pinch hit. Baseball Reference states Burgess had 144 career pinch hits. Burgess and Mota (150 career pinch hits) were later surpassed by Lenny Harris (212 pinch hits) and Mark Sweeney (175 pinch hits).

Along with Curt Simmons, he was the last player to formally retire who had played in the major leagues in the 1940s (not counting Minnie Miñoso, who un-retired twice).

Burgess was inducted into the Cincinnati Reds Hall of Fame, in 1975. Burgess was inducted into the North Carolina Sports Hall of Fame, in 1978. Burgess was inducted into the Rutherford County, North Carolina Hall of Fame, in 2017.

On November 9, 2024, a statue of Burgess completing his left-handed swing was unveiled in his hometown of Forest City.

== Scout and coach ==
When his playing career ended, Burgess spent many years with the Atlanta Braves as a scout and minor league batting coach with the Pulaski Braves, in Pulaski, Virginia. At the time of his death, he was still working for the Braves as a scout.

== Personal life and death ==
After retiring as a player, Burgess operated an automobile dealership in Forest City, North Carolina, Piedmont Carolina Motors, about six miles from his Caroleen, North Carolina birthplace. Burgess had a stomach ulcer for most of his playing career. An operation to treat the ulcer later cost him a baseball coaching job, as it left him weak for a year.

Burgess died at age 64, in Rutherfordton, North Carolina, September 15, 1991, survived by his wife, Margaret and son, Larry, both of Forest City, North Carolina. Margaret never called him Smoky, only Forrest.

== See also ==
- Major League Baseball all-time pinch hit leaders
