= Floyd Wooldridge =

American baseball player (1928–2008)

- Pitcher
- Born: August 25, 1928; Jerico Springs, Missouri, US
- Died: May 14, 2008 (aged 79); Springfield, Missouri US
- Batted: Right Threw: Right

MLB debut
- May 1, 1955, for the St. Louis Cardinals

Last MLB appearance
- August 15, 1955, for the St. Louis Cardinals

MLB statistics
- Win–loss record: 2–4
- Earned run average: 4.84
- Strikeouts: 14
- Stats at Baseball Reference

Teams
- St. Louis Cardinals (1955)

Floyd Lewis Wooldridge (August 15, 1928 – May 14, 2008) was an American professional baseball player. A right-handed pitcher, he appeared in 18 Major League Baseball games for the 1955 St. Louis Cardinals. The native of Jerico Springs, Missouri, was measured during his playing days at 6 feet 1 inch (1.85 m) tall and 185 pounds (84 kg).

== Career ==
Wooldridge started eight games during his MLB career. Both of his victories were complete-game efforts. On June 23, he defeated the Philadelphia Phillies 7–1 at Busch Stadium, scattering seven hits and issuing two bases on balls. On July 3, he defeated the Chicago Cubs 8–2 at Wrigley Field, giving up only five hits, walking three and striking out five.

In 57 2/3 major league innings, Wooldridge allowed 64 hits (including nine home runs) and 31 earned runs, walking 27 and striking out 14. During his minor league career (1950–53; 1955–57) he appeared in 193 games and posted a 59–62 won/lost record.
