= Marv Blaylock =

American baseball player (1929-1993)

- First baseman
- Born: September 30, 1929; Fort Smith, Arkansas, U.S.
- Died: October 23, 1993 (aged 64); Conway, Arkansas, U.S.
- Batted: Left Threw: Left

MLB debut
- September 26, 1950, for the New York Giants

Last MLB appearance
- September 28, 1957, for the Philadelphia Phillies

MLB statistics
- Batting average: .235
- Home runs: 15
- Runs batted in: 78
- Stats at Baseball Reference

Teams
- New York Giants (1950); Philadelphia Phillies (1955–1957)

Marvin Edward Blaylock (September 30, 1929 – October 23, 1993) was an American professional baseball first baseman and outfielder, who played in Major League Baseball (MLB) for the Philadelphia Phillies and New York Giants. Between 1950 and 1957, he appeared in 287 big league games. Blaylock threw and batted left-handed, standing 6 feet 1 inch (1.85 m) tall and weighing 175 pounds (79 kg), during his playing days.

Originally signed by the Giants in 1947, Blaylock appeared in only one MLB game for them, as a pinch hitter on September 26, 1950. Batting for pitcher Larry Jansen, he popped out to third baseman Billy Cox off Ralph Branca of the Brooklyn Dodgers. Blaylock then returned to Minor League Baseball (MiLB) for four full seasons, batting over .300 for the 1954 Syracuse Chiefs of the Triple-A International League, the top farm club of the Phillies, which earned him a second trial in MLB.

Blaylock was the Phillies' most-used first baseman in both 1955 and 1956. In 1955, he appeared in 113 games, starting 55 of them (while Earl Torgeson, Eddie Waitkus, and Stan Lopata each started more than 25 games at first for the team). Blaylock batted only .208 with three home runs that season. However, in 1956, he started 110 games at first, improved his batting average to .254, and hit ten home runs, fourth on the team.

But it was not enough production, and Blaylock lost his starting job to rookie Ed Bouchee in 1957. He was sent down to the Triple-A Miami Marlins for 41 games before his recall in September 1957. In his final Major League at bat, Blaylock hit a pinch hit home run off René Valdés of the Dodgers in an 8–4 loss at Connie Mack Stadium. As a Major Leaguer, he had 175 total hits, including 21 doubles, 15 triples, and 15 homers.

Blaylock was out of baseball in 1958 but returned for a final pro season in 1959 at the Double-A level, with the Nashville Vols of the Southern Association.
