= Johnny Klippstein =

American baseball player (1927–2003)

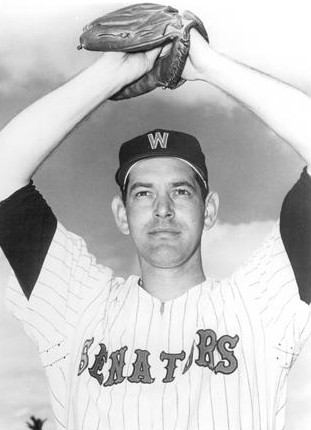
- Pitcher
- Born: October 17, 1927; Washington, D.C., U.S.
- Died: October 10, 2003 (aged 75); Elgin, Illinois, U.S.
- Batted: Right Threw: Right

MLB debut
- May 3, 1950, for the Chicago Cubs

Last MLB appearance
- May 27, 1967, for the Detroit Tigers

MLB statistics
- Win–loss record: 101–118
- Earned run average: 4.24
- Strikeouts: 1,158
- Saves: 66
- Stats at Baseball Reference

Teams
- Chicago Cubs (1950–1954); Cincinnati Redlegs (1955–1958); Los Angeles Dodgers (1958–1959); Cleveland Indians (1960); Washington Senators (1961); Cincinnati Reds (1962); Philadelphia Phillies (1963–1964); Minnesota Twins (1964–1966); Detroit Tigers (1967)

Career highlights and awards
- World Series champion (1959)

John Calvin Klippstein (/ˈklɪpstaɪn/ KLIP-styne; October 17, 1927 – October 10, 2003) was an American professional baseball pitcher (mostly a reliever), who played in Major League Baseball (MLB) for a number of teams, over an 18-season career. The most prominent portion of his early career was spent with the Chicago Cubs (1950–1954). Klippstein’s career stat line included a 101–118 record, with a 4.24 earned run average (ERA), in 711 games (161 of them as a starter). He had 1,158 strikeouts in 1,967 2/3 innings pitched. Klippstein was often known for his control problems.

Klippstein became a world champion with the Los Angeles Dodgers, in the 1959 World Series, but played a much more significant role in the Minnesota Twins’ pennant run in 1965. He was the son-in-law of (the late) MLB pitcher Dutch Leonard. Klippstein was tied (with Mike Fornieles) for the league lead in saves in 1960, with 14.

Klippstein died October 10, 2003, while listening to a radio broadcast of the Cubs versus Florida Marlins game of the 2003 National League Championship Series.

== See also ==
- List of Major League Baseball annual saves leaders
