= Roy Smalley Jr. =

American baseball player (1926–2011)

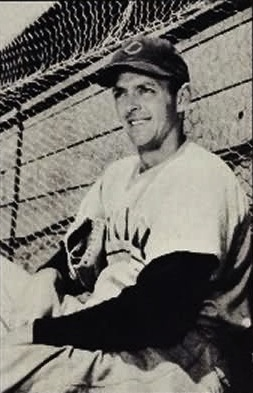
- Smalley in 1953.
- Shortstop
- Born: June 9, 1926; Springfield, Missouri, U.S.
- Died: October 22, 2011 (aged 85); Sahuarita, Arizona, U.S.
- Batted: Right Threw: Right

MLB debut
- April 20, 1948, for the Chicago Cubs

Last MLB appearance
- April 21, 1958, for the Philadelphia Phillies

MLB statistics
- Batting average: .227
- Home runs: 61
- Runs batted in: 305
- Stats at Baseball Reference

Teams
- Chicago Cubs (1948–1953); Milwaukee Braves (1954); Philadelphia Phillies (1955–1958)

Roy Frederick Smalley Jr. (June 9, 1926 – October 22, 2011) was a shortstop in Major League Baseball. From 1948 through 1958, Smalley played for the Chicago Cubs (1948–1953), Milwaukee Braves (1954) and Philadelphia Phillies (1955–1958). He batted and threw right-handed. In an 11-season career, Smalley was a .227 hitter with 61 home runs and 305 RBI in 872 games played. Smalley was the father of major league shortstop Roy Smalley III.

== Career ==
Smalley was signed at age 17 by the Cubs as an amateur free agent out of Springfield Catholic High School. He began his professional career in 1944 with the Los Angeles Angels of the Pacific Coast League, where he batted just .188 in 61 games. After missing the 1945 season due to military service, Smalley was moved down to the Shelby Cubs for the 1946 season. By the end of the year, he was back with the Angels. In 1947, Smalley spent the entire season with the Class A Des Moines Bruins, where he batted .244 in 114 games.

=== Chicago Cubs ===
Smalley's 1947 minor league season was impressive enough that in 1948 he was given the starting shortstop job with the major league Cubs, replacing incumbent Lennie Merullo, who was sent to the minors himself for the season. Smalley remained the Cubs' primary shortstop for the remainder of his tenure with the team.

Smalley's best season statistically was 1950. He posted career highs in home runs (21), RBI (85), runs (58), hits (128) and doubles (21), including hitting for the cycle on June 28. He struck out a league-leading 114 times. He made 51 errors (the last time a player made at least 50), but he also led National League shortstops in total chances per game, as he had in 1949, and in double plays.

Smalley was the last regular shortstop for the Cubs prior to the debut of "Mr. Cub", Ernie Banks. Smalley appeared in 77 games at short during the 1953 season, more than any other Cubs player. Banks debuted on September 17 and started the last 10 games of the season.

In his six seasons with Chicago, Smalley appeared in 661 games, batting .232 with 52 home runs and 242 RBIs.

=== Milwaukee Braves ===
Smalley was traded to the Braves in March 1954 for pitcher Dave Cole. He appeared in 25 games for the Braves during the 1954 season, batting .222 with 1 home run and 7 RBIs.

=== Philadelphia Phillies ===
In April 1955, the Phillies purchased Smalley's contract. He played for them for the 1955 through 1957 seasons, plus a single game in the 1958 season. In his time with the Phillies, he appeared in a total of 186 games, batting .204 with 8 home runs and 56 RBIs.

=== Return to the minors ===
After being released by the Phillies in May 1958, Smalley signed with the St. Louis Cardinals and the spent the season with their Triple AAA club, the Rochester Red Wings. For the 1959 season, Smalley played for the Houston Buffs and the Minneapolis Millers. He played for the Spokane Indians of the Los Angeles Dodgers organization for the 1960 season, after which he retired.

Smalley was named manager of the Class C Reno Silver Sox in 1961, and he managed the team to a first-place finish in the California League in his first season. In 1962, the team slipped into a tie for third place, and Smalley was let go; during the season he played in one game, his final professional appearance as a player.

== Personal life ==
Smalley served a year in the military during World War II. During the 1950 season, he married Jolene Mauch, sister of former teammate Gene Mauch, in Brookline, Massachusetts, while the Cubs were in Boston playing the Braves on August 5. Smalley had played a 13-inning game earlier that day, going 0-for-5. Their son Roy III, born in 1952, went on to play shortstop in the major leagues for several teams from 1975 until 1987, including several years for the Minnesota Twins when Mauch was their manager. Smalley lived in Sahuarita, Arizona, from 2004 until his death in October 2011.

== See also ==
- List of Major League Baseball players to hit for the cycle

Achievements
Preceded by Ralph Kiner	Hitting for the cycle June 28, 1950	Succeeded by Elmer Valo
