= Windy McCall =

American baseball player (1925–2015)

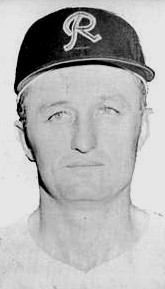
- McCall in 1959
- Pitcher
- Born: July 18, 1925; San Francisco, California, U.S.
- Died: February 5, 2015 (aged 89); Tucson, Arizona, U.S.
- Batted: Left Threw: Left

MLB debut
- April 25, 1948, for the Boston Red Sox

Last MLB appearance
- May 5, 1957, for the New York Giants

MLB statistics
- Win–loss record: 11–15
- Earned run average: 4.22
- Strikeouts: 144
- Stats at Baseball Reference

Teams
- Boston Red Sox (1948–1949); Pittsburgh Pirates (1950); New York Giants (1954–1957)

Career highlights and awards
- World Series champion (1954)

John William McCall (July 18, 1925 – February 5, 2015) was an American relief pitcher in Major League Baseball who played from 1948 through 1957 for the Boston Red Sox (1948–49), Pittsburgh Pirates (1950) and New York Giants (1954–57). Listed at 6 feet (1.83 m) tall and 180 pounds (82 kg), McCall batted and threw left-handed. He was born in San Francisco, California, and studied at the University of San Francisco. He was a United States Marine Corps veteran of World War II, serving in the Pacific Theater of Operations, including Iwo Jima and Okinawa.

In a seven-season MLB career, McCall posted an 11–15 record with a 4.22 ERA and 12 saves in 134 appearances, including 15 starts, four complete games, 144 strikeouts, 103 walks, 249 hits allowed, and 253 1/3 innings of work. McCall also pitched for the San Francisco Seals of the Pacific Coast League from 1951 to 1953. According to the Baseball Register, McCall was nicknamed "Windy" by Red Sox slugger Ted Williams as a young player when asking about his bats. Williams said to a sportswriter in referring to McCall, "the windy one told me when I was pitching batting practice to bring up some of my good bats." McCall died on February 5, 2015, but the news of his death did not reach researchers until 2016.
