= Joe Black =

American baseball player (1924-2002)

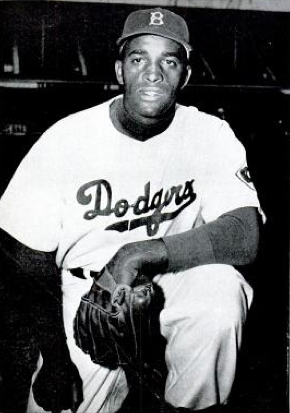
- Pitcher
- Born: February 8, 1924; Plainfield, New Jersey, U.S.
- Died: May 17, 2002 (aged 78); Scottsdale, Arizona, U.S.
- Batted: Right Threw: Right

Professional debut
- NgL: 1943, for the Baltimore Elite Giants
- MLB: May 1, 1952, for the Brooklyn Dodgers

Last MLB appearance
- September 11, 1957, for the Washington Senators

MLB (Note: On December 16, 2020, Major League Baseball declared the Negro leagues, from the span of 1920–1948, to be a "Major League". Black's statistics reflect his time in the Negro leagues from 1943-1948.) statistics
- Win–loss record: 49–36
- Earned run average: 3.72
- Strikeouts: 454
- Stats at Baseball Reference

Teams
- Negro leagues: Baltimore Elite Giants (1943–1950); Major League Baseball: Brooklyn Dodgers (1952–1955); Cincinnati Redlegs (1955–1956); Washington Senators (1957)

Career highlights and awards
- 3x NgL All-Star (1947, 1948, 1950); NL Rookie of the Year (1952); Negro National League strikeout leader (1948)

Joseph Black (February 8, 1924 – May 17, 2002) was an American professional baseball pitcher in the Negro leagues and Major League Baseball (MLB) for the Baltimore Elite Giants, Brooklyn Dodgers, Cincinnati Redlegs, and Washington Senators. Black became the first black pitcher to win a World Series game, in 1952.

== Education and military service ==
A native of Plainfield, New Jersey, he starred at Plainfield High School. Black was drafted by the US Army during World War II and served for two and a half years in the Medical Corp. He was stationed stateside in Long Island, Texas and Missouri, where he played for various camp sports teams. He attended Morgan State University originally playing football, basketball and track, and returned after his Army discharge graduating in 1950 with a degree in psychology and physical education. He later received an honorary doctorate from Shaw University. He was a member of Omega Psi Phi fraternity.

== Negro and minor leagues ==
In 1943, Black tried out for the Baltimore Elite Giants and had the opportunity to pitch in two games before he was drafted. Since he was stationed stateside, he was still able to pitch for the Elite Giants "during weekend passes and furloughs," but was still limited to only ten games in the next two years. After his discharge, Black helped the Elite Giants win the 1949 Negro American League pennant. He was a three-time Negro league All-Star, in 1947, 1948 and 1950. Black and Jackie Robinson pushed for a pension plan for Negro league players and was instrumental in getting the plan to include retired players who had played in the leagues before 1944. Black then played for a year in the Brooklyn Dodgers' minor league system.

== Call up to Brooklyn ==
The Dodgers promoted Black to the major leagues in 1952 at 28, five years after teammate Jackie Robinson broke baseball's color barrier. He roomed with Robinson while on the Dodgers. Black was chosen Rookie of the Year after winning 15 games and saving 15 others for the National League champions. He had a 2.15 ERA but, with 142 innings pitched, fell eight innings short of winning the ERA title.

Strapped for pitching, Dodgers manager Chuck Dressen brought Black out of the bullpen and started him three times in seven days in the 1952 World Series against the New York Yankees. He won the opener with a six-hitter over Allie Reynolds, 4–2, then lost the fourth game, 2–0, and the seventh, 4–2.

The spring after the 1952 World Series, Dressen urged Black to add some pitches to his strong fastball and tight curve. He tried, but lost control of his two basic pitches in the process and didn't regain his dominance until 1955. After three more seasons with Brooklyn, Black drifted to Cincinnati and Washington and was out of baseball by 1958. In six seasons, he compiled a 30–12 record, half of his wins coming in his rookie season.

== After baseball ==
After his career ended, Black was a scout for the Washington Senators (1959–60). He taught health and physical education at Hubbard Junior High School in Plainfield, New Jersey, and later became an executive with Greyhound in Phoenix.

In addition to lobbying for black players, he remained in baseball through his affiliation with the commissioner's office, where he consulted with players about career choices.

He appears prominently in Roger Kahn's 1972 book, The Boys of Summer. In 1991, Black appeared as a fictional character, 'Joe 'Playday' Sims', in TV's Cosby Show, in the 7th Season episode, "There's Still No Joy in Mudville", which originally aired April 4, 1991.

He was a board director of the Baseball Assistance Team and worked for the Arizona Diamondbacks in community relations after they joined the National League in 1998. Black was a regular in the Diamondbacks' dugout during batting practice and in the press box. He also performed much charity work in the Phoenix area.

He wrote a syndicated column, "By the Way", for Ebony magazine and an autobiography, Ain't Nobody Better Than You.

Years later, Peter O'Malley (son of Walter, who owned the team before Peter) awarded Black a 1955 championship ring (Black had been traded prior to the World Series run).

Black died of prostate cancer at age 78 on May 17, 2002. He was interred in the Hillside Cemetery in Scotch Plains, New Jersey.

== Honors and awards ==
The Arizona Fall League's Most Valuable Player award is named for Black. First presented in 2002, the award honors the 1952 National League Rookie of the Year.

There is a plaque honoring him at Chase Field alongside the Diamondbacks' championships and retired numbers.

Beginning in 2010, the Washington Nationals have presented the Joe Black Award to a Washington area organization chosen for its work promoting baseball in African American communities. The award recognizes Black as the first African American player on the Washington Senators (1957).

In 2010, the Plainfield, NJ school board named the Plainfield High School baseball complex "The Joe Black Baseball Field" in his honor.

== See also ==
- List of Negro league baseball players who played in Major League Baseball
