= Dave Cole (baseball) =

American baseball player (1930–2011)

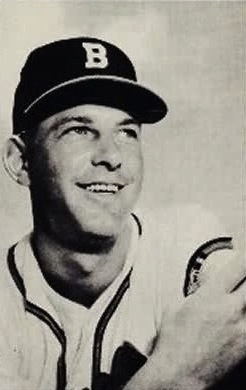
- Cole in 1953
- Pitcher
- Born: August 29, 1930; Williamsport, Maryland, U.S.
- Died: October 26, 2011 (aged 81); Williamsport, Maryland, U.S.
- Batted: Right Threw: Right

MLB debut
- September 9, 1950, for the Boston Braves

Last MLB appearance
- June 6, 1955, for the Philadelphia Phillies

MLB statistics
- Win–loss record: 6–18
- Earned run average: 4.94
- Strikeouts: 119
- Stats at Baseball Reference

Teams
- Boston / Milwaukee Braves (1950–1953); Chicago Cubs (1954); Philadelphia Phillies (1955)

David Bruce Cole (August 29, 1930 – October 26, 2011) was an American professional baseball pitcher, who played in Major League Baseball (MLB) for six seasons, between 1950 and 1955.

Born in Williamsport, Maryland and attended Williamsport High School, Cole was known as one of the "wildest" pitchers with a career BB/9 of 7.556

Cole achieved the notable feat of recording three outs without throwing a single strike while pitching for the Boston Braves in 1952 in a game against the Philadelphia Phillies.

Cole spent four years with the Braves, following the team from Boston to Milwaukee before spending a season with the Chicago Cubs. From the Cubs, he was traded to the Philadelphia Phillies for Roy Smalley Jr. Upon his trade to Philadelphia in 1955, he is said to have remarked: "That's too bad; they're the only team I can beat."
