= 1955 Pittsburgh Pirates season =

1955 Pittsburgh Pirates
- League: National League
- Ballpark: Forbes Field
- City: Pittsburgh
- Owners: John W. Galbreath (majority shareholder); Bing Crosby, Thomas P. Johnson, Branch Rickey (minority shareholders)
- General managers: Branch Rickey
- Managers: Fred Haney
- Radio: WWSW; Bob Prince, Dick Bingham

The 1955 Pittsburgh Pirates season was the 74th season of the Pittsburgh Pirates franchise; the 69th in the National League. The Pirates finished eighth and last in the league standings with a record of 60–94.

== Offseason ==
- Prior to 1955 season: Ellis Burton was signed as an amateur free agent by the Pirates.

== Regular season ==
=== Season standings ===
National League
Team	W	L	Pct.	GB	Home	Road
Brooklyn Dodgers	98	55	.641	—	56‍–‍21	42‍–‍34
Milwaukee Braves	85	69	.552	13½	46‍–‍31	39‍–‍38
New York Giants	80	74	.519	18½	44‍–‍35	36‍–‍39
Philadelphia Phillies	77	77	.500	21½	46‍–‍31	31‍–‍46
Cincinnati Redlegs	75	79	.487	23½	46‍–‍31	29‍–‍48
Chicago Cubs	72	81	.471	26	43‍–‍33	29‍–‍48
St. Louis Cardinals	68	86	.442	30½	41‍–‍36	27‍–‍50
Pittsburgh Pirates	60	94	.390	38½	36‍–‍39	24‍–‍55

=== Record vs. opponents ===
1955 National League record Sources:
Team	BRO	CHC	CIN	MIL	NYG	PHI	PIT	STL
Brooklyn	—	14–7–1	12–10	15–7	13–9	16–6	14–8	14–8
Chicago	7–14–1	—	11–11	7–15	12–10	10–12	11–11	14–8
Cincinnati	10–12	11–11	—	9–13	9–13	11–11	14–8	11–11
Milwaukee	7–15	15–7	13–9	—	14–8	14–8	11–11	11–11
New York	9–13	10–12	13–9	8–14	—	10–12	17–5	13–9
Philadelphia	6–16	12–10	11–11	8–14	12–10	—	15–7	13–9
Pittsburgh	8–14	11–11	8–14	11–11	5–17	7–15	—	10–12
St. Louis	8–14	8–14	11–11	11–11	9–13	9–13	12–10	—

=== Game log ===
1955 Game Log: 60–94 (Home: 36–39; Away: 24–55)
April: 3–11 (Home: 2–6; Away: 1–5)

#	Date	Opponent	Score	Win	Loss	Save	Attendance	Record
1	April 13	@ Dodgers	1–6	Erskine	**Surkont** (0–1)	—	6,999	0–1
2	April 14	Phillies	3–4	Wehmeier	**Littlefield** (0–1)	—	23,540	0–2
3	April 16	Dodgers	0–6	Meyer	**Purkey** (0–1)	—	5,533	0–3
4	April 17	Dodgers	3–10	Podres	**Thies** (0–1)	—		0–4
5	April 17	Dodgers	2–3	Labine	**Kline** (0–1)	Hughes	20,499	0–5
6	April 18	@ Giants	3–12	Liddle	**Surkont** (0–2)	Grissom	2,915	0–6
7	April 22	@ Phillies	4–5	Miller	**Bowman** (0–1)	—	5,821	0–7
8	April 23	@ Phillies	0–8	Dickson	**Kline** (0–2)	—	4,132	0–8
9	April 24	@ Phillies	6–1	**Surkont** (1–2)	Owens	—		1–8
10	April 24	@ Phillies	0–3	Meyer	**King** (0–1)	Roberts	8,224	1–9
11	April 27	Cubs	4–1	**Purkey** (1–1)	Minner	—	1,044	2–9
12	April 28	Redlegs	2–3	Staley	**Littlefield** (0–2)	Lane	6,907	2–10
13	April 29	Redlegs	0–5	Nuxhall	**Surkont** (1–3)	—	6,341	2–11
14	April 30	Redlegs	5–4	**Friend** (1–0)	Lane	—	3,118	3–11

May: 11–20 (Home: 7–9; Away: 4–11)

#	Date	Opponent	Score	Win	Loss	Save	Attendance	Record
15	May 1	Cardinals	3–4	Tiefenauer	**Bowman** (0–2)	Moford		3–12
16	May 1	Cardinals	7–0	**Kline** (1–2)	Jones	—	13,213	4–12
17	May 2	Cardinals	5–1	**Purkey** (2–1)	Haddix	—	2,181	5–12
18	May 3	Braves	4–0	**Littlefield** (1–2)	Spahn	—	10,784	6–12
19	May 4	Braves	5–4	**Surkont** (2–3)	Jolly	**Friend** (1)	13,374	7–12
20	May 5	Braves	9–4	**King** (1–1)	Buhl	**Law** (1)	4,329	8–12
21	May 6	@ Giants	3–2	**Kline** (2–2)	Antonelli	**Wade** (1)	10,330	9–12
22	May 7	@ Giants	3–11	Hearn	**Purkey** (2–2)	—	8,926	9–13
23	May 8	@ Giants	7–5	**Littlefield** (2–2)	Gomez	**Face** (1)		10–13
24	May 8	@ Giants	3–6	Maglie	**Law** (0–1)	—	14,180	10–14
25	May 10	@ Braves	9–6	**Surkont** (3–3)	Johnson	—	20,562	11–14
26	May 11	@ Braves	3–8	Nichols	**Kline** (2–3)	—	12,444	11–15
27	May 12	@ Cubs	0–4	Jones	**King** (1–2)	—	2,918	11–16
28	May 14	@ Cardinals	0–6	Lawrence	**Littlefield** (2–3)	—	9,479	11–17
29	May 15	@ Cardinals	1–5	Jones	**Surkont** (3–4)	Schultz	10,996	11–18
30	May 16	@ Cardinals	0–6	Arroyo	**Kline** (2–4)	—	5,184	11–19
31	May 17	@ Redlegs	2–9	Nuxhall	**Purkey** (2–3)	—	4,881	11–20
32	May 18	@ Redlegs	1–5	Minarcin	**Littlefield** (2–4)	—	2,079	11–21
33	May 20	Giants	3–6	Wilhelm	**Surkont** (3–5)	Grissom	15,722	11–22
34	May 21	Giants	2–3	Maglie	**Kline** (2–5)	Grissom	5,731	11–23
35	May 22	Giants	2–5	Gomez	**Bowman** (0–3)	—		11–24
36	May 22	Giants	3–5 (8)	Wilhelm	**Wade** (0–1)	Grissom	16,691	11–25
37	May 24	Dodgers	15–1	**Friend** (2–0)	Podres	—	9,251	12–25
38	May 26	Dodgers	2–6	Newcombe	**Kline** (2–6)	—	2,680	12–26
39	May 27	Phillies	2–5 (10)	Wehmeier	**Friend** (2–1)	—	6,956	12–27
40	May 28	Phillies	4–8 (11)	Miller	**Face** (0–1)	Meyer	3,082	12–28
41	May 29	Phillies	2–5	Roberts	**Pepper** (0–1)	—		12–29
42	May 29	Phillies	11–5	**Surkont** (4–5)	Cole	—	5,918	13–29
43	May 30	@ Dodgers	4–8	Meyer	**Purkey** (2–4)	Roebuck		13–30
44	May 30	@ Dodgers	3–8	Newcombe	**Kline** (2–7)	—	26,711	13–31
45	May 31	@ Dodgers	6–3	**Friend** (3–1)	Roebuck	—	6,008	14–31

June: 10–18 (Home: 5–7; Away: 5–11)

#	Date	Opponent	Score	Win	Loss	Save	Attendance	Record
46	June 1	Cardinals	2–6	Arroyo	**Purkey** (2–5)	—	7,580	14–32
47	June 2	Cardinals	12–3	**Surkont** (5–5)	Haddix	—	2,052	15–32
48	June 3	Redlegs	7–6	**Law** (1–1)	Ridzik	—		16–32
49	June 4	Redlegs	0–6	Minarcin	**Kline** (2–8)	—	4,072	16–33
50	June 5	Redlegs	7–6	**Surkont** (6–5)	Klippstein	—		17–33
51	June 5	Redlegs	1–5	Collum	**Purkey** (2–6)	—	10,308	17–34
52	June 7	Cubs	3–4	Hacker	**King** (1–3)	Pollet	65,681	17–35
53	June 8	Cubs	2–1	**Kline** (3–8)	Davis	—	3,779	18–35
54	June 9	Cubs	2–6	Minner	**Purkey** (2–7)	—	2,187	18–36
55	June 11	Braves	4–7	Conley	**Friend** (3–2)	—	1,995	18–37
56	June 12	Braves	5–3	**Law** (2–1)	Spahn	**Face** (2)		19–37
57	June 12	Braves	5–6	Buhl	**Surkont** (6–6)	—	12,738	19–38
58	June 14	@ Cardinals	10–5	**Kline** (4–8)	Jackson	—	7,962	20–38
59	June 15	@ Cardinals	3–7	Arroyo	**Friend** (3–3)	—	6,524	20–39
60	June 16	@ Cardinals	0–5	Haddix	**Law** (2–2)	—	6,277	20–40
61	June 17	@ Redlegs	3–1	**Surkont** (7–6)	Collum	**Kline** (1)	6,872	21–40
62	June 18	@ Redlegs	1–4	Staley	**Donoso** (0–1)	—	3,433	21–41
63	June 19	@ Redlegs	5–2	**Friend** (4–3)	Minarcin	—		22–41
64	June 19	@ Redlegs	0–4	Nuxhall	**Kline** (4–9)	—	11,640	22–42
65	June 20	@ Braves	1–2	Conley	**Law** (2–3)	—	21,510	22–43
66	June 21	@ Braves	4–6	Buhl	**Kline** (4–10)	—	25,510	22–44
67	June 22	@ Braves	0–6	Spahn	**Surkont** (7–7)	—	23,219	22–45
68	June 24	@ Cubs	3–10	Minner	**Friend** (4–4)	—	4,424	22–46
69	June 25	@ Cubs	4–6	Hacker	**Littlefield** (2–5)	—	12,181	22–47
70	June 26	@ Cubs	5–4	**Law** (3–3)	Davis	**Surkont** (1)		23–47
71	June 26	@ Cubs	1–2	Rush	**Donoso** (0–2)	—	24,500	23–48
72	June 28	@ Phillies	7–5 (10)	**Friend** (5–4)	Meyer	**Face** (3)	8,635	24–48
73	June 29	@ Phillies	3–6	Negray	**Littlefield** (2–6)	—	4,919	24–49

July: 14–19 (Home: 10–12; Away: 4–7)

#	Date	Opponent	Score	Win	Loss	Save	Attendance	Record
74	July 1	@ Dodgers	3–2	**Law** (4–3)	Podres	—	10,325	25–49
75	July 2	@ Dodgers	7–6 (10)	**Kline** (5–10)	Labine	—	6,158	26–49
76	July 3	@ Dodgers	7–5	**Kline** (6–10)	Roebuck	—		27–49
77	July 3	@ Dodgers	1–3	Loes	**Surkont** (7–8)	Labine	15,000	27–50
78	July 4	Giants	4–3	**Donoso** (1–2)	McCall	—		28–50
79	July 4	Giants	3–5 (11)	Grissom	**Donoso** (1–3)	—	16,902	28–51
80	July 5	Giants	1–11	Antonelli	**Martin** (0–1)	—	7,245	28–52
81	July 6	Dodgers	5–10	Erskine	**Face** (0–2)	Roebuck		28–53
82	July 6	Dodgers	4–1	**Law** (5–3)	Roebuck	—	20,674	29–53
83	July 7	Dodgers	3–4	Loes	**Kline** (6–11)	—	4,533	29–54
84	July 8	Phillies	1–5	Wehmeier	**Surkont** (7–9)	—	7,304	29–55
85	July 9	Phillies	1–7	Roberts	**Littlefield** (2–7)	—	2,637	29–56
86	July 10	Phillies	1–4	Simmons	**Friend** (5–5)	—		29–57
87	July 10	Phillies	3–1	**Law** (6–3)	Negray	—	6,454	30–57
88	July 14	Redlegs	1–19	Collum	**Surkont** (7–10)	—	6,947	30–58
89	July 15	Redlegs	1–9	Nuxhall	**Law** (6–4)	Freeman	1,563	30–59
90	July 16	Cardinals	5–1	**Donoso** (2–3)	Arroyo	—	2,579	31–59
91	July 17	Cardinals	8–9 (12)	Arroyo	**Donoso** (2–4)	Lawrence		31–60
92	July 17	Cardinals	0–1	Haddix	**Face** (0–3)	—	8,490	31–61
93	July 19	Braves	4–3 (19)	**Friend** (6–5)	Conley	—	7,953	32–61
94	July 20	Braves	4–3	**Littlefield** (3–7)	Crone	—	5,568	33–61
95	July 21	Braves	3–5	Spahn	**Donoso** (2–5)	—	2,568	33–62
96	July 22	Cubs	3–1	**Face** (1–3)	Minner	—	7,388	34–62
97	July 23	Cubs	10–2	**Friend** (7–5)	Hacker	—	2,955	35–62
98	July 24	Cubs	12–5	**Hall** (1–0)	Rush	—		36–62
99	July 24	Cubs	3–2 (10)	**Law** (7–4)	Jones	—	14,466	37–62
100	July 26	@ Cardinals	3–1	**Littlefield** (4–7)	Arroyo	—	10,261	38–62
101	July 27	@ Cardinals	1–6	Haddix	**Face** (1–4)	—	6,424	38–63
102	July 28	@ Cardinals	1–4	Schmidt	**Hall** (1–1)	—	6,039	38–64
103	July 29	@ Redlegs	5–16	Nuxhall	**Law** (7–5)	—	5,690	38–65
104	July 30	@ Redlegs	2–5	Collum	**Friend** (7–6)	—	3,030	38–66
105	July 31	@ Redlegs	4–7	Black	**Littlefield** (4–8)	Freeman		38–67
106	July 31	@ Redlegs	5–6	Freeman	**Donoso** (2–6)	—	9,704	38–68

August: 14–12 (Home: 9–4; Away: 5–8)

#	Date	Opponent	Score	Win	Loss	Save	Attendance	Record
107	August 1	@ Cubs	5–4	**Hall** (2–1)	Minner	—	3,194	39–68
108	August 2	@ Cubs	4–12	Rush	**Littlefield** (4–9)	—	1,788	39–69
109	August 3	@ Cubs	3–2	**Face** (2–4)	Davis	**Surkont** (2)		40–69
110	August 3	@ Cubs	4–5 (12)	Perkowski	**Law** (7–6)	—	8,805	40–70
111	August 4	@ Cubs	10–11	Tremel	**Littlefield** (4–10)	—	3,486	40–71
112	August 5	@ Braves	8–5	**Hall** (3–1)	Spahn	**Donoso** (1)	21,791	41–71
113	August 6	@ Braves	2–0	**Friend** (8–6)	Crone	—	16,337	42–71
114	August 7	@ Braves	3–6	Nichols	**Law** (7–7)	Johnson		42–72
115	August 7	@ Braves	2–4	Buhl	**Face** (2–5)	—	26,955	42–73
116	August 9	@ Phillies	1–9	Wehmeier	**Hall** (3–2)	—	9,347	42–74
117	August 10	@ Phillies	3–2 (10)	**Friend** (9–6)	Miller	—	3,922	43–74
118	August 14	@ Giants	2–4	Antonelli	**Law** (7–8)	—		43–75
119	August 14	@ Giants	1–3	Hearn	**Hall** (3–3)	—	7,166	43–76
120	August 16	Phillies	3–12	Wehmeier	**Friend** (9–7)	—	6,290	43–77
121	August 17	Phillies	6–4	**Face** (3–5)	Simmons	—	3,721	44–77
122	August 19	Giants	8–3	**Law** (8–8)	Antonelli	—	9,695	45–77
123	August 20	Giants	9–14 (12)	Hearn	**Littlefield** (4–11)	—	4,336	45–78
124	August 23	Redlegs	2–1	**Law** (9–8)	Freeman	—	6,387	46–78
125	August 24	Redlegs	4–2	**Hall** (4–3)	Nuxhall	—	2,399	47–78
126	August 25	Cubs	2–1	**Face** (4–5)	Minner	—	6,181	48–78
127	August 26	Cubs	3–6	Jones	**Friend** (9–8)	—	5,376	48–79
128	August 27	Cubs	3–4	Pollet	**Surkont** (7–11)	—	3,210	48–80
129	August 28	Braves	5–3	**Hall** (5–3)	Crone	**Kline** (2)		49–80
130	August 28	Braves	2–0	**Law** (10–8)	Spahn	—	12,032	50–80
131	August 30	Cardinals	3–1	**Littlefield** (5–11)	Haddix	**Face** (4)	7,526	51–80
132	August 31	Cardinals	4–3 (10)	**Donoso** (3–6)	Schmidt	—	6,379	52–80

September: 8–14 (Home: 3–1; Away: 5–13)

#	Date	Opponent	Score	Win	Loss	Save	Attendance	Record
133	September 1	Cardinals	7–6	**Face** (5–5)	Wright	—	2,878	53–80
134	September 2	@ Dodgers	0–2	Spooner	**Hall** (5–4)	—	10,827	53–81
135	September 3	@ Dodgers	0–4	Koufax	**Friend** (9–9)	—	7,767	53–82
136	September 4	@ Dodgers	5–6	Labine	**Surkont** (7–12)	Craig	13,258	53–83
137	September 5	@ Giants	8–5 (10)	**Friend** (10–9)	Grissom	**Hall** (1)		54–83
138	September 5	@ Giants	3–6	Liddle	**Face** (5–6)	—	10,352	54–84
139	September 7	@ Cubs	2–0	**Friend** (11–9)	Minner	—	3,076	55–84
140	September 9	@ Braves	2–3	Spahn	**Hall** (5–5)	—	15,614	55–85
141	September 10	@ Braves	5–13	Crone	**Law** (10–9)	—	11,071	55–86
142	September 11	@ Cardinals	5–6	Jackson	**Littlefield** (5–12)	—	7,877	55–87
143	September 12	@ Cardinals	9–3	**Donoso** (4–6)	Haddix	—	3,289	56–87
144	September 13	@ Redlegs	5–2	**Friend** (12–9)	Nuxhall	—	3,962	57–87
145	September 16	@ Phillies	1–8	Roberts	**Surkont** (7–13)	—	10,023	57–88
146	September 18	@ Phillies	5–2	**Friend** (13–9)	Wehmeier	**Face** (5)		58–88
147	September 18	@ Phillies	1–2	Rogovin	**Hall** (5–6)	—	12,683	58–89
148	September 20	@ Giants	1–11	Antonelli	**Law** (10–10)	—		58–90
149	September 20	@ Giants	8–14	Wilhelm	**Surkont** (7–14)	—	1,165	58–91
150	September 21	@ Giants	2–7	Liddle	**Face** (5–7)	—		58–92
151	September 21	@ Giants	3–7	Monzant	**Kline** (6–12)	—	2,091	58–93
152	September 24	Dodgers	4–3	**Hall** (6–6)	Bessent	—		59–93
153	September 24	Dodgers	6–1	**Friend** (14–9)	Koufax	—	4,531	60–93
154	September 25	Dodgers	0–4	Meyer	**Kline** (6–13)	Craig	25,185	60–94

Legend: = Win = Loss
Bold = Pirates team member

=== Notable transactions ===
- August 27, 1955: Red Swanson was signed as an amateur free agent (bonus baby) by the Pirates.

=== Roster ===
1955 Pittsburgh Pirates
**Roster**
**Pitchers**: 20,57 Bill Bell; 31 Roger Bowman; 31 Lino Donoso; 26 Roy Face; 19 Bob Friend; 37 Al Grunwald; 30 Dick Hall; 30 Nellie King; 22 Ron Kline; 32 Vern Law; 27 Dick Littlefield; 28 Paul Martin; 23 Laurin Pepper; 34 Bob Purkey; 35 Max Surkont; 20 Red Swanson; 39 Jake Thies; 28 Ben Wade; 34 Fred Waters	**Catchers**: 11 Toby Atwell; 9 Nick Koback; 17 Hardy Peterson; 10 Jack Shepard; **Infielders**: 12 Dick Cole; 8 Gene Freese; 3 George Freese; 4 Sid Gordon; 24 Dick Groat; 29 Dale Long; 6 Johnny O'Brien; 7 Curt Roberts; 6 Dick Smith; 5 Preston Ward	**Outfielders**: 13,21 Roberto Clemente; 18 Jerry Lynch; 25 Román Mejías; 14 Felipe Montemayor; 7 Eddie O'Brien; 14 Johnny Powers; 16 Tom Saffell; 21 Earl Smith; 15 Frank Thomas	**Manager**: 2 Fred Haney; **Coaches**: 40 John Fitzpatrick; 43 Sam Narron; 41 Clyde Sukeforth

== Player stats ==
=== Batting ===
==== Starters by position ====
Note: Pos = Position; G = Games played; AB = At bats; H = Hits; Avg. = Batting average; HR = Home runs; RBI = Runs batted in

Pos	Player	G	AB	H	Avg.	HR	RBI
C	Jack Shepard	94	264	63	.239	2	23
1B	Dale Long	131	419	122	.291	16	79
2B	Johnny O'Brien	84	278	83	.299	1	25
SS	Dick Groat	151	521	139	.267	4	51
3B	Gene Freese	134	455	115	.253	14	44
LF	Frank Thomas	142	510	125	.245	25	72
CF	Eddie O'Brien	75	236	55	.233	0	8
RF	Roberto Clemente	124	474	121	.255	5	47

==== Other batters ====
Note: G = Games played; AB = At bats; H = Hits; Avg. = Batting average; HR = Home runs; RBI = Runs batted in

Player	G	AB	H	Avg.	HR	RBI
Jerry Lynch	88	282	80	.284	5	28
Dick Cole	77	239	54	.226	0	21
Toby Atwell	71	207	44	.213	1	18
Preston Ward	84	179	38	.212	5	25
George Freese	51	179	46	.257	3	22
Román Mejías	71	167	36	.216	3	21
Tom Saffell	73	113	19	.168	1	3
Felipe Montemayor	36	95	20	.211	2	8
Hardy Peterson	32	81	20	.247	1	10
Sid Gordon	16	47	8	.170	0	1
Curt Roberts	6	17	2	.118	0	0
Earl Smith	5	16	1	.063	0	0
Nick Koback	5	7	2	.286	0	0
John Powers	2	4	1	.250	0	0
Dick Smith	4	0	0	----	0	0

=== Pitching ===
==== Starting pitchers ====
Note: G = Games pitched; IP = Innings pitched; W = Wins; L = Losses; ERA = Earned run average; SO = Strikeouts

Player	G	IP	W	L	ERA	SO
Vern Law	43	200.2	10	10	3.81	82
Max Surkont	35	166.1	7	14	5.57	84
Dick Hall	15	94.1	6	6	3.91	46
Bob Purkey	14	67.2	2	7	5.32	24
Jake Thies	1	3.2	0	1	4.91	0

==== Other pitchers ====
Note: G = Games pitched; IP = Innings pitched; W = Wins; L = Losses; ERA = Earned run average; SO = Strikeouts

Player	G	IP	W	L	ERA	SO
Bob Friend	44	200.1	14	9	2.83	98
Ron Kline	36	136.2	6	13	4.15	48
Dick Littlefield	35	130.0	5	12	5.12	70
Roy Face	42	125.2	5	7	3.58	84
Lino Donoso	25	95.0	4	6	5.31	38
Nellie King	17	54.1	1	3	2.98	21
Roger Bowman	7	16.2	0	3	8.64	8
Paul Martin	7	7.0	0	1	14.14	3

==== Relief pitchers ====
Note: G = Games pitched; W = Wins; L = Losses; SV = Saves; ERA = Earned run average; SO = Strikeouts

Player	G	W	L	SV	ERA	SO
Laurin Pepper	14	0	1	0	10.35	7
Ben Wade	11	0	1	1	3.21	7
Al Grunwald	3	0	0	0	4.70	2
Fred Waters	2	0	0	0	3.60	0
Red Swanson	1	0	0	0	18.00	0
Bill Bell	1	0	0	0	0.00	0

== Awards and honors ==
All-Star Game

- Frank Thomas, reserve

== Farm system ==
Level	Team	League	Manager
Open	Hollywood Stars	Pacific Coast League	Bobby Bragan
AA	New Orleans Pelicans	Southern Association	Andy Cohen
A	Williamsport Grays	Eastern League	Larry Shepard
A	Lincoln Chiefs	Western League	Bill Burwell
B	Waco Pirates	Big State League	Stan Wentzel
B	Burlington-Graham Pirates	Carolina League	Lamar Dorton
C	Phoenix Stars	Arizona–Mexico League	Jerry Gardner
C	Salinas Packers	California League	Buck Elliott and Jack Paepke
C	Billings Mustangs	Pioneer League	Jack Paepke and Buck Elliott
C	St. Jean Canadiens	Provincial League	Steve Mizerak and Fred Luciano
D	Dublin Irish	Georgia State League	George Kinnamon
D	Brunswick Pirates	Georgia–Florida League	Frank Oceak
D	Clinton Pirates	Mississippi–Ohio Valley League	Robert Clark

LEAGUE CO-CHAMPIONS: Brunswick
