= List of baseball players who went directly to Major League Baseball =

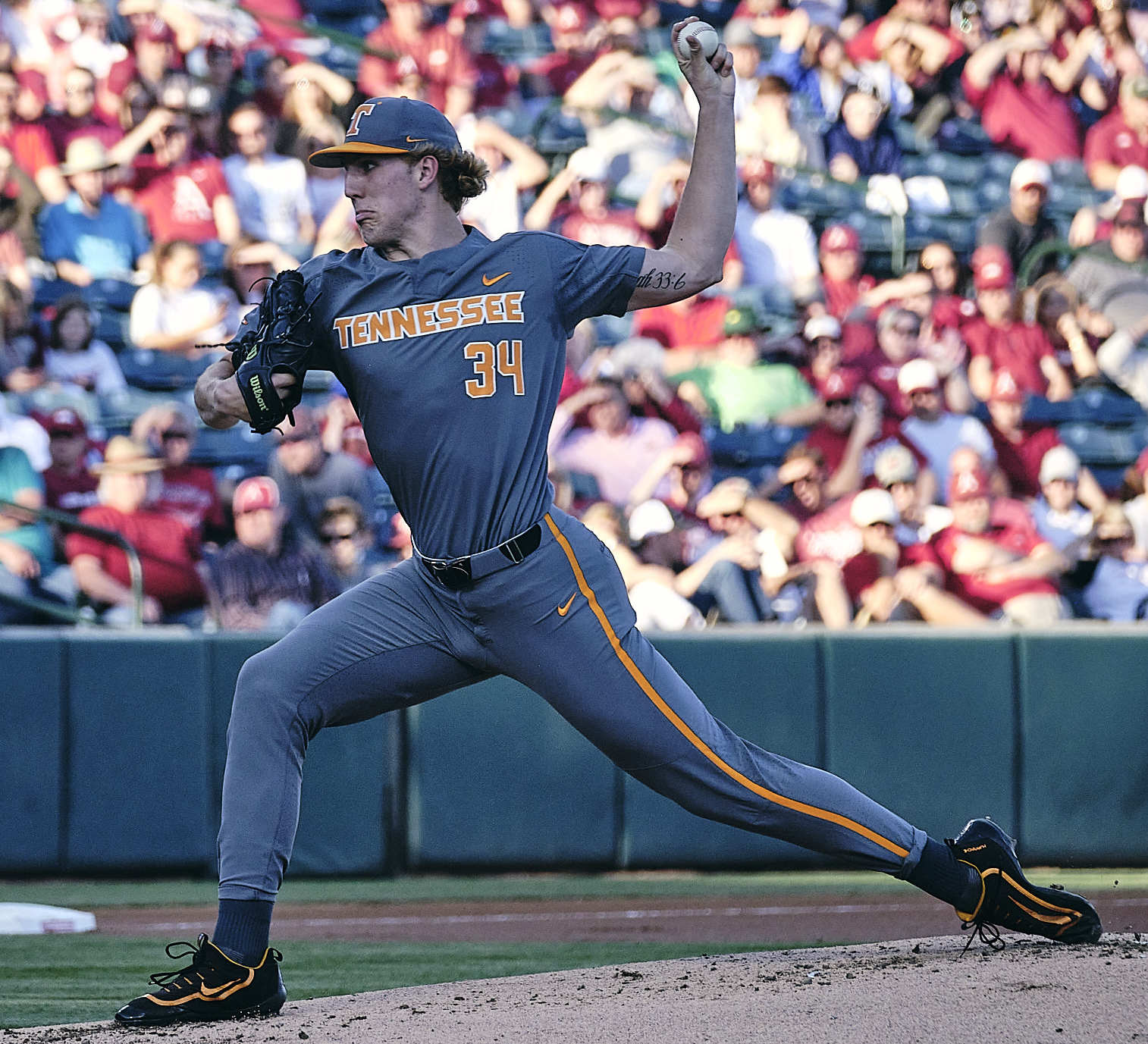
Garrett Crochet is the most recent player to jump from amateur baseball directly to Major League Baseball and become an All-Star.

This is a list of baseball players who went directly to the major leagues. They are distinguished as a group by having made their North American professional baseball debut with a Major League Baseball (MLB) franchise without having previously played at the professional level. After their major-league debuts, many of these players appeared in professional leagues other than MLB.

Included are multiple "bonus babies" who were signed under the bonus rule, in force intermittently between 1947 and 1964, which obligated major-league teams to keep players awarded large signing bonuses on their rosters. Excluded are players who, prior to their major-league debut, appeared in any professional baseball game, such as within Minor League Baseball, Negro league baseball, professional leagues outside of North America (such as Nippon Professional Baseball), or independent baseball leagues. A player who participated only in offseason developmental baseball (such as winter league baseball) is not excluded.

The practice of players directly joining a major-league team has become increasingly rare since the major-league draft was instituted in 1965, as only 24 drafted players have accomplished the feat. The most recent player to accomplish the feat is pitcher Ryan Johnson, who made his debut in 2025 with the Los Angeles Angels.

== Players ==
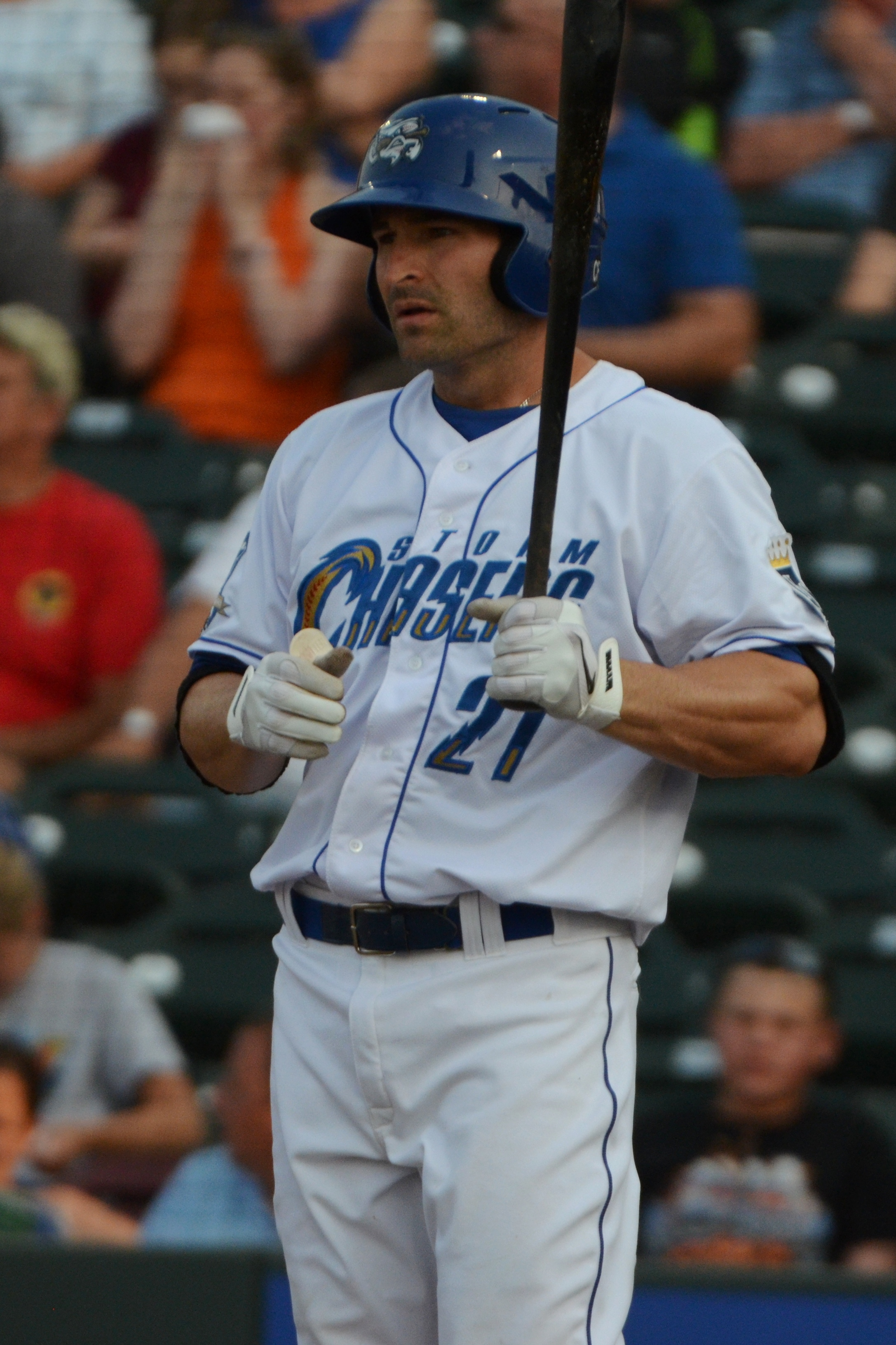
Xavier Nady is the most recent non-pitcher to go directly to MLB.

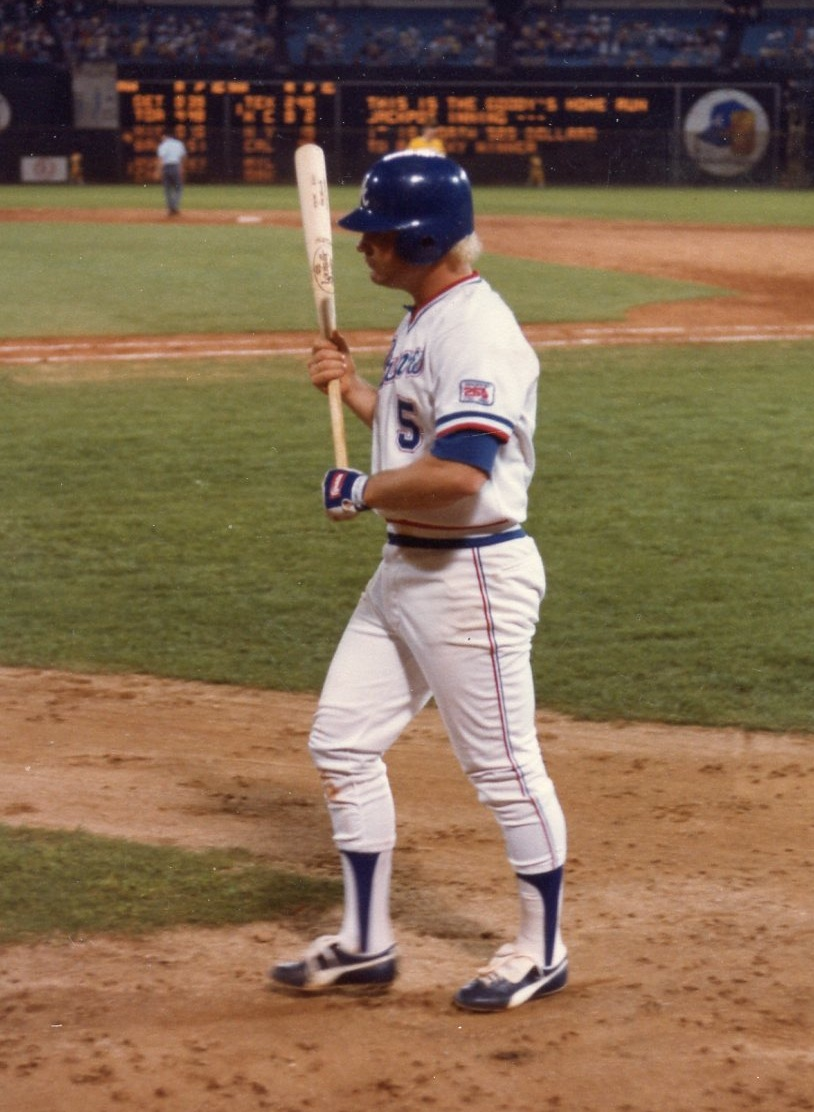
Bob Horner is the only player to go directly to MLB and win a Rookie of the Year Award.

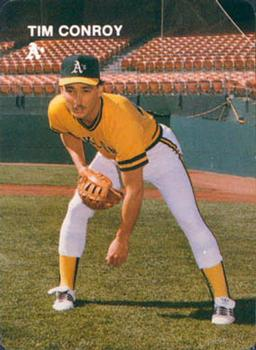
Tim Conroy and Brian Milner are the most recent players to go straight from high school to MLB, having debuted on the same day in 1978.

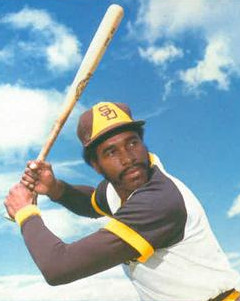
Dave Winfield is the most recent player to jump directly to MLB and subsequently be inducted into the Hall of Fame.

Listed below are baseball players who did not play baseball professionally before their major-league debuts. The players are grouped by era: the early years of baseball, "bonus babies" (circa 1947–1964), and players selected in the major-league draft (1965–present). A few players who have accomplished the feat since World War II were neither bonus babies nor draft selections; they are listed independently.

Each of these players, with the exception of Charlie Faust, Eddie Gaedel, and Herb Washington, first played amateur baseball in an organized sports league, typically at the high school or college level. Faust played two games with the 1911 New York Giants, essentially as a good luck charm under manager John McGraw. Gaedel, who stood 3 feet 7 inches (1.09 m), played one game with the 1951 St. Louis Browns, as a gimmick of owner Bill Veeck. Washington, who played for the Oakland Athletics in the mid-1970s, was put under contract by owner Charlie Finley due to his experience as a world-class sprinter.

Key
*	Inducted into the Baseball Hall of Fame
+	"Bonus babies"
^	Selected in a major-league draft

=== Early years ===
The below players are known to have advanced directly to the major leagues between the start of the modern baseball era (considered 1900) and the creation of the bonus rule in 1947. Listed alphabetically.

Several of the below made their debuts due to a shortage of players during World War II. Examples include Joe Nuxhall, who went on to pitch in over 500 major-league games, and Harry MacPherson, who appeared in a single game in 1944. Multiple of the listed players made their debuts with the Philadelphia Athletics, as longtime manager Connie Mack "relied largely on an informal network of old ballplayers, high school and college coaches, and other friendly sources" to find players.

Note that some major-league players listed in some sources as having never played in the minor leagues are excluded here, as they played semi-professionally before their major-league debuts. Examples include Milt Gaston and Danny MacFayden. Other players, whose statistics are incomplete or appear to indicate that they did not first play in the minor leagues, are known to have played professionally prior to their major-league debuts. Examples include Wayne Ambler.

Name	Position	Amateur team	MLB team	Debut	Ref.
Ethan Allen	Outfielder	Cincinnati	Cincinnati Reds	1926	
Walter Ancker	Pitcher	Tenafly Base Ball Club (NJ)	Philadelphia Athletics	1915	
Jack Barry^{*}	Shortstop	Holy Cross	Philadelphia Athletics	1908	
Jack Coombs	Pitcher	Colby	Philadelphia Athletics	1906	
Joe Dugan	Third baseman	Holy Cross	Philadelphia Athletics	1917	
Charlie Faust	Pitcher	—	New York Giants	1911	
Bob Feller^{*}	Pitcher	Van Meter HS (IA)	Cleveland Indians	1936	
Frankie Frisch^{*}	Second baseman	Fordham	New York Giants	1919	
Johnson Fry	Pitcher	Groves-Thornton Tumblers (WV)	Cleveland Indians	1923	
Gil Hodges^{*}	Third baseman	St. Joseph's	Brooklyn Dodgers	1943	
Ted Lyons^{*}	Pitcher	Baylor	Chicago White Sox	1923	
Harry MacPherson	Pitcher	Johnson HS (MA)	Boston Braves	1944	
Cal McLish	Pitcher	Central HS (OK)	Brooklyn Dodgers	1944	
Cass Michaels	Second baseman	Hamtramck HS (MI)	Chicago White Sox	1943	
Joe Nuxhall	Pitcher	Hamilton HS (OH)	Cincinnati Reds	1944	
Mel Ott^{*}	Outfielder	Gretna HS (LA)	New York Giants	1926	
Eddie Plank^{*}	Pitcher	Gettysburg	Philadelphia Athletics	1901	
Eppa Rixey^{*}	Pitcher	Virginia	Philadelphia Phillies	1912	
Carl Scheib	Pitcher	Simon Gratz HS (PA)	Philadelphia Athletics	1943	
Tillie Shafer	Infielder	Santa Clara	New York Giants	1909	
George Sisler^{*}	First baseman	Michigan	St. Louis Browns	1915	
Cy Williams	Outfielder	Notre Dame	Chicago Cubs	1912	
Eddie Yost	Third baseman	NYU	Washington Senators	1944	
Tom Zachary	Pitcher	Guilford	Philadelphia Athletics	1918	

=== Bonus babies ===
These players advanced directly to the major leagues while being subjected to baseball's bonus rule, which required teams to place any player who received a signing bonus of greater than $4,000 on their major-league rosters. The rule was in force intermittently from 1947 through 1964, most notably from 1953 through 1957. Not all players who were subjected to the bonus rule went on to play in the major leagues. There were also instances of teams avoiding the bonus rule, such as by having a player sign their contract with a minor-league affiliate. "Bonus babies" who did make their major-league debuts without playing in the minor leagues are listed below, alphabetically.

Name	Position	Amateur team	MLB team	Debut
Joey Amalfitano^{+}	Second baseman	Loyola Marymount	New York Giants	1954
Johnny Antonelli^{+}	Pitcher	Thomas Jefferson HS (NY)	Boston Braves	1948
Reno Bertoia^{+}	Third baseman	Assumption College HS (ON)	Detroit Tigers	1953
Steve Boros^{+}	Infielder	Michigan	Detroit Tigers	1957
Clete Boyer^{+}	Third baseman	Alba HS (MO)	Kansas City Athletics	1955
Jim Brady^{+}	Pitcher	Notre Dame	Detroit Tigers	1956
Mack Burk^{+}	Catcher	Texas	Philadelphia Phillies	1956
Tom Carroll^{+}	Infielder	Notre Dame	New York Yankees	1955
Wayne Causey^{+}	Infielder	Neville HS (LA)	Baltimore Orioles	1955
Billy Consolo^{+}	Shortstop	Dorsey HS (CA)	Boston Red Sox	1953
John DeMerit^{+}	Outfielder	Wisconsin	Milwaukee Braves	1957
Jim Derrington^{+}	Pitcher	South Gate HS (CA)	Chicago White Sox	1956
Moe Drabowsky^{+}	Pitcher	Trinity College (CT)	Chicago Cubs	1956
John Edelman^{+}	Pitcher	West Chester	Milwaukee Braves	1955
Bob Garibaldi^{+}	Pitcher	Santa Clara	San Francisco Giants	1962
Tom Gastall^{+}	Catcher	Boston University	Baltimore Orioles	1955
Paul Giel^{+}	Pitcher	Minnesota	New York Giants	1954
Bobby Henrich^{+}	Shortstop	Compton HS (CA)	Cincinnati Redlegs	1957
Dave Hill^{+}	Pitcher	Northwestern	Kansas City Athletics	1957
Jay Hook^{+}	Pitcher	Northwestern	Cincinnati Redlegs	1957
Catfish Hunter^{*+}	Pitcher	Perquimans County HS (NC)	Kansas City Athletics	1965 (Note: Catfish Hunter played nine games in the Florida Instructional League (whose players are paid) in the fall of 1964, prior to his major-league debut on May 13, 1965. The Florida Instructional League is considered a developmental winter league, thus Hunter is not excluded from this list.)
Ron Jackson^{+}	First baseman	Western Michigan	Chicago White Sox	1954
Vic Janowicz^{+}	Catcher	Ohio State	Pittsburgh Pirates	1953
Joey Jay^{+}	Pitcher	Woodrow Wilson HS (CT)	Milwaukee Braves	1953
Don Kaiser^{+}	Pitcher	East Central University	Chicago Cubs	1955
Al Kaline^{*+}	Outfielder	Southern HS (MD)	Detroit Tigers	1953
Harmon Killebrew^{*+}	First baseman	Payette HS (ID)	Washington Senators	1954
Jerry Kindall^{+}	Second baseman	Minnesota	Chicago Cubs	1956
Nick Koback^{+}	Catcher	Hartford Public HS (CT)	Pittsburgh Pirates	1953
Sandy Koufax^{*+}	Pitcher	Cincinnati	Brooklyn Dodgers	1955
Kenny Kuhn^{+}	Infielder	Louisville Male HS (KY)	Cleveland Indians	1955
Frank Leja^{+}	First baseman	Holyoke HS (MA)	New York Yankees	1954
Ralph Lumenti^{+}	Pitcher	Boston University	Washington Senators	1957
Mike McCormick^{+}	Pitcher	Mark Keppel HS (CA)	New York Giants	1956
Lindy McDaniel^{+}	Pitcher	Arnett HS (OK)	St. Louis Cardinals	1955
Von McDaniel^{+}	Pitcher	Arnett HS (OK)	St. Louis Cardinals	1957
Bob G. Miller^{+}	Pitcher	Morton East HS (IL)	Cincinnati Redlegs	1953
Bob L. Miller^{+}	Pitcher	Beaumont HS (MO)	St. Louis Cardinals	1957
Paul Martin^{+}	Pitcher	Marion Center Area HS (PA)	Pittsburgh Pirates	1955
Tex Nelson^{+}	First baseman	W. H. Adamson HS (TX)	Baltimore Orioles	1955
Eddie O'Brien^{+}	Shortstop	Seattle	Pittsburgh Pirates	1953
Johnny O'Brien^{+}	Second baseman	Seattle	Pittsburgh Pirates	1953
Billy O'Dell^{+}	Pitcher	Clemson	Baltimore Orioles	1954
Jim Pagliaroni^{+}	Catcher	Wilson HS (CA)	Boston Red Sox	1955
Don Pavletich^{+}	Catcher	Nathan Hale HS (WI)	Cincinnati Reds	1957
Laurin Pepper^{+}	Pitcher	Southern Miss	Pittsburgh Pirates	1954
Leroy Powell^{+}	Pinch runner	Michigan State	Chicago White Sox	1955
Buddy Pritchard^{+}	Second baseman	USC	Pittsburgh Pirates	1957
Jim Pyburn^{+}	Third baseman	Alabama Polytechnic Institute	Baltimore Orioles	1955
Tom Qualters^{+}	Pitcher	McKeesport HS (PA)	Philadelphia Phillies	1953
Mel Roach^{+}	Infielder	Virginia	Milwaukee Braves	1953
Jerry Schoonmaker^{+}	Outfielder	Missouri	Washington Senators	1955
Al Silvera^{+}	Outfielder	USC	Cincinnati Reds	1955
Jim Small^{+}	Outfielder	Bellarmine College Prep (CA)	Detroit Tigers	1955
Red Swanson^{+}	Pitcher	LSU	Pittsburgh Pirates	1955
Hawk Taylor^{+}	Catcher	Metropolis Community HS (IL)	Milwaukee Braves	1957
George Thomas^{+}	Outfielder	Minnesota	Detroit Tigers	1957
Fred Van Dusen^{+}	Pinch hitter	Bryant HS (NY)	Philadelphia Phillies	1955
Jerry Walker^{+}	Pitcher	Byng HS (OK)	Baltimore Orioles	1957
Frank Zupo^{+}	Catcher	Sacred Heart Cathedral Prep (CA)	Baltimore Orioles	1957

=== Draft selections ===
A total of 24 players have accomplished the feat after being selected in a major-league draft, which began in 1965. Listed chronologically.

No.	Name	Position	Amateur team	MLB team	Debut
1	Mike Adamson^{^}	Pitcher	USC	Baltimore Orioles	1967
2	Steve Dunning^{^}	Pitcher	Stanford	Cleveland Indians	1970
3	Burt Hooton^{^}	Pitcher	Texas	Chicago Cubs	1971
4	Rob Ellis^{^}	Outfielder	Michigan State	Milwaukee Brewers	1971
5	Pete Broberg^{^}	Pitcher	Dartmouth	Washington Senators	1971
6	Dave Roberts^{^}	Third baseman	Oregon	San Diego Padres	1972
7	Dick Ruthven^{^}	Pitcher	Fresno State	Philadelphia Phillies	1973
8	Dave Winfield^{*^}	Outfielder	Minnesota	San Diego Padres	1973
9	David Clyde^{^}	Pitcher	Westchester HS (TX)	Texas Rangers	1973
10	Eddie Bane^{^}	Pitcher	Arizona State	Minnesota Twins	1973
11	Denny Walling^{^}	Outfielder	Clemson	Oakland Athletics	1975
12	Mike Morgan^{^}	Pitcher	Valley HS (NV)	Oakland Athletics	1978
13	Bob Horner^{^}	Third baseman	Arizona State	Atlanta Braves	1978
14	Tim Conroy^{^}	Pitcher	Gateway Senior HS (PA)	Oakland Athletics	1978
15	Brian Milner^{^}	Catcher	Fort Worth Southwest HS (TX)	Toronto Blue Jays	1978
16	Pete Incaviglia^{^}	Outfielder	Oklahoma State	Texas Rangers	1986
17	Jim Abbott^{^}	Pitcher	Michigan	California Angels	1989
18	John Olerud^{^}	First baseman	Washington State	Toronto Blue Jays	1989
19	Darren Dreifort^{^}	Pitcher	Wichita State	Los Angeles Dodgers	1994
20	Ariel Prieto^{^}	Pitcher	Isla de la Juventud (Cuba)	Oakland Athletics	1995
21	Xavier Nady^{^}	Outfielder	California	San Diego Padres	2000
22	Mike Leake^{^}	Pitcher	Arizona State	Cincinnati Reds	2010
23	Garrett Crochet^{^}	Pitcher	Tennessee	Chicago White Sox	2020
24	Ryan Johnson^{^}	Pitcher	Dallas Baptist	Los Angeles Angels	2025

=== Other players ===
Listed here are players who have debuted directly in the major leagues since World War II without playing professionally beforehand and without being subjected to the bonus rule or being selected in the major-league draft. Listed alphabetically.

Name	Position	Amateur team	MLB team	Debut	Ref.
Eddie Gaedel	Pinch hitter	—	St. Louis Browns	1951	
Dick Groat	Shortstop	Duke	Pittsburgh Pirates	1952	
Claude Osteen	Pitcher	Reading HS (OH)	Cincinnati Reds	1957	
Chan Ho Park	Pitcher	Hanyang University (South Korea)	Los Angeles Dodgers	1994	
Herb Washington	Pinch runner	—	Oakland Athletics	1974	
