= Mike Leake =

American baseball player (born 1987)

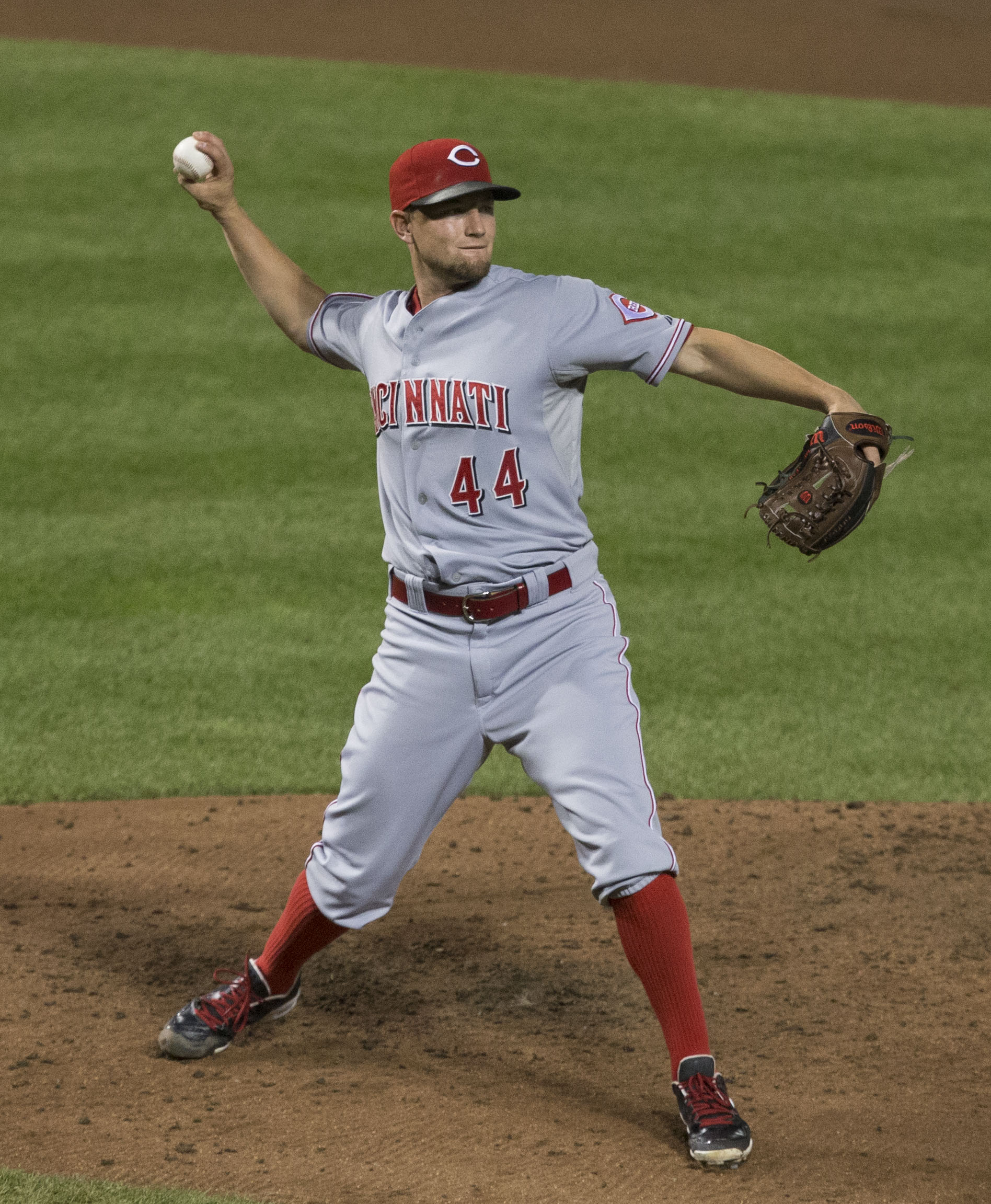
- Leake with the Cincinnati Reds in 2014
- Pitcher
- Born: November 12, 1987 (age 38); San Diego, California, U.S.
- Batted: Right Threw: Right

MLB debut
- April 11, 2010, for the Cincinnati Reds

Last MLB appearance
- September 24, 2019, for the Arizona Diamondbacks

MLB statistics
- Win–loss record: 105–98
- Earned run average: 4.05
- Strikeouts: 1,231
- Stats at Baseball Reference

Teams
- Cincinnati Reds (2010–2015); San Francisco Giants (2015); St. Louis Cardinals (2016–2017); Seattle Mariners (2017–2019); Arizona Diamondbacks (2019)

Career highlights and awards
- Gold Glove Award (2019)
Medals
Men's baseball
Representing United States
World University Championship
Gold medal – first place	2008 Brno	National team

Michael Raymond Leake (born November 12, 1987) is an American former professional baseball pitcher. He played in Major League Baseball (MLB) for the Cincinnati Reds, San Francisco Giants, St. Louis Cardinals, Seattle Mariners, and Arizona Diamondbacks.

Leake played college baseball for the Arizona State Sun Devils of Arizona State University. The Reds selected Leake in the first round of the 2009 MLB draft. They promoted him to the major leagues at the start of the 2010 season without having him pitch in the minor leagues, making him the 21st player to go straight from the draft to the major league team that drafted him.

Leake pitched for the Reds through 2015, at which point he was traded to the Giants. A free agent that offseason, he signed with the Cardinals. The Cardinals traded him to the Mariners in 2017. He was traded for a third time in his career in 2019 as the Arizona Diamondbacks agreed to acquire him at the Trade Deadline.

== Early life ==
=== Personal life ===
Leake was born in San Diego, California, and grew up in Valley Center, California, the son of Chris and Sarah Leake. Both his brother and his father call him Mikey. Leake grew up as a Seattle Mariners fan and idolized Vladimir Guerrero and Nolan Ryan among others. He started playing baseball at age five by tagging along with his older brother everywhere, to the point that Ryan complained about Mike to his parents. Chris and Sarah Leake convinced Ryan to put up with Mike and teach him how to act both on and off the field.

Leake is listed at 6-foot-1, 190 pounds, in the Reds' media guide, but he himself admits that he is actually about 5-foot-10, 175 pounds.

=== High school ===
His freshman and sophomore years, Leake attended Valley Center High School, where he started on the varsity baseball team. Leake transferred to Fallbrook High School, where he lettered in baseball two years and was co-team captain for the baseball team his senior season. He graduated in 2006.

During his junior year, Leake batted .431 with 10 home runs and 31 runs batted in (RBIs) while compiling a 9–3 win–loss record with a 1.87 earned run average (ERA). The next year, he batted .342 with eight home runs and went 11–1 with a 1.87 ERA. His pitching performances those years helped him win the Avocado League Pitcher of the Year award twice.

Leake was a two-time All-Avocado League honoree; he was twice named to both the first and second teams. He was named the team MVP his sophomore year and was selected to the first team all-CIF his junior and senior years. He was on the first team all-state those two years as well. Additionally, Leake won the Avocado League's Cy Young Award twice, was selected to the first all-academic team twice, and earned the Fallbrook High School Principal's Award twice.

== College career ==
After graduating from high school, Leake attended Arizona State University, where he majored in management.

=== 2007 ===
Leake began his season as the closer for Arizona State, but soon became a starter. Over the course of the year, Leake had a 13–2 record with a save and a 3.69 ERA in his 25 appearances, 13 of which were starts. His 13 wins, the third most in Arizona State history by a freshman, tied him with his teammate, Josh Satow, for the Pac-10 lead. Leake also set the Arizona State freshman record with 127 innings pitched and 94 strikeouts. Those were the sixth-most and ninth-most in the SEC that year.

He was named to the First Team All-Pac-10. Collegiate Baseball Newspaper named Leake a Third Team All-American and a First Team Freshman All-American. Additionally, Leake was named to the All-Houston College Classic tournament team and the All-Coca-Cola Classic Team. He was also voted the Most Outstanding Player of the Tempe Regional.

=== 2008 ===
Continuing where he left off at the end of his freshman year, Leake had an 11–3 record with a save and a 3.49 ERA in his 19 appearances, 16 of which were starts. Having totaled 24 career victories through this point in his collegiate career, Leake became one of only nine Sun Devils to reach 20 career wins. He also was one of only three Sun Devils to have done so by their sophomore year. He also batted .340 with 2 homers and 11 RBI in 47 at-bats while playing first base, second base, shortstop, left field, center field, and right field. He hit his first career home run against UCLA on May 4, 2008.

Leake led the Pac-10 with 121.1 innings pitched and was named the Pac-10 Pitcher of the Year. He was also named First Team All-Pac-10 and Second Team All-America by Baseball America and Collegiate Baseball Newspaper. However, the National Collegiate Baseball Writers Association named him Third Team All-America. Leake was also selected to the Second Team All-West Region by the American Baseball Coaches Association and was a semifinalist for the Roger Clemens Award, given to top NCAA Division I college baseball pitcher of the year. He was also selected to the All-Tempe Regional Team and the First Team Academic All-Pac-10. ESPN The Magazine made the sophomore an Academic All-District VII selection.

That summer Leake played for the USA Collegiate National Team. The team won gold medals at the Haarlem Baseball Week in the Netherlands and the World University Baseball Championship in the Czech Republic. In those tournaments Leake appeared 8 times and had a 3–0 record with a 0.64 ERA. He also hit .236 with a homer and 8 RBI in 55 at-bats.

=== 2009 ===
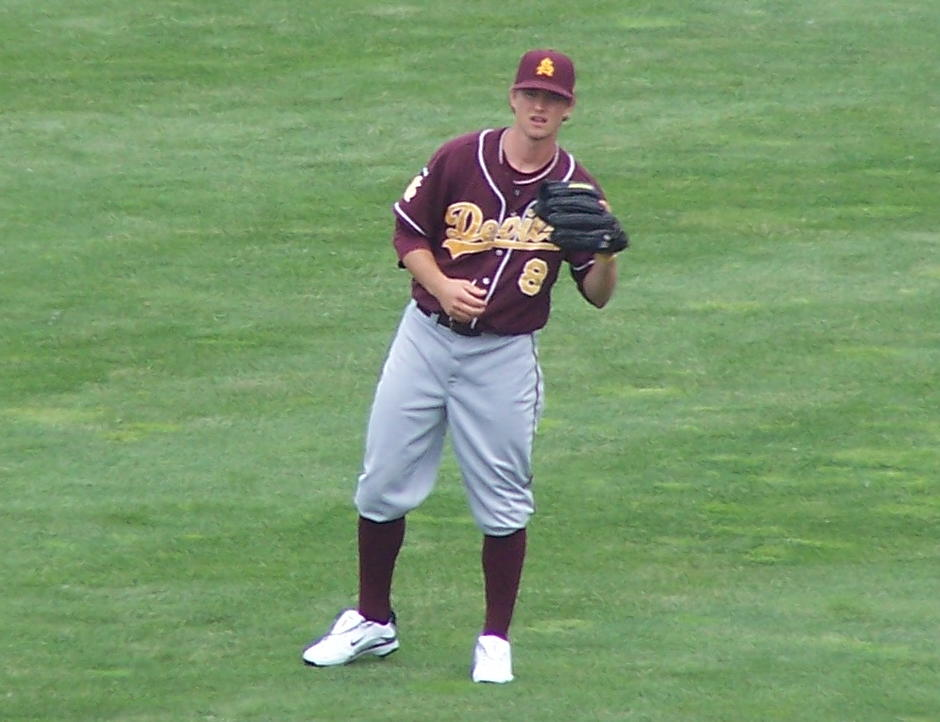
Leake plays catch at the 2009 College World Series.

During his junior year, Leake went 16–1 with a 1.71 ERA, 142 innings pitched, and 162 strikeouts, limiting batters to a .193 average, the second lowest in the Pac-10. He threw seven complete games, including back-to-back shutouts, and compiled 26 straight scoreless innings at one point. His 40 career wins tied him for the third most in school history by a three-year pitcher. Leake joined Eddie Bane as one of only two Arizona State pitchers to win 10 or more games for three straight seasons, and Raoul Torrez as one of only two to win three straight Pac-10 titles.

For the second straight season Leake won the Pac-10 Pitcher of the Year Award, becoming the first back-to-back winner and the fourth two-time winner of the award. Also for the second year, he was named First Team Academic Pac-10, Most Outstanding Player of the Tempe Regional, and Academic All-District VIII by ESPN The Magazine. He won the National Pitcher of the Week award twice and the Pac-10 pitcher of the Week four times. At the end of the season Leake was named National Player of the Year by the American Baseball Coaches Association and became a finalist for the Golden Spikes Award, given annually to the best amateur baseball player, the Dick Howser Trophy, presented by the National Collegiate Baseball Writers Association to the national college baseball player of the year, and the National Pitcher of the Year award. He was also named the Academic All-American of the Year and was a unanimous First Team All-American.

== Professional career ==
=== Cincinnati Reds ===
==== 2010 ====
Leake was drafted out of high school in 2006 by the Oakland Athletics in the seventh round (218th overall), but chose instead to attend college. The Cincinnati Reds re-drafted him eighth overall in the 2009 draft, which Leake accepted. He received a $2.3 million signing bonus and was signed to a $400,000 contract. He played for the Peoria Saguaros in the Arizona Fall League, winning the Arizona Fall League Rising Star Award.

In 2010, Leake competed for the Reds' fifth starter spot and ultimately won a spot on the Reds' twenty-five man roster amid competition from veterans Mike Lincoln, Justin Lehr, and Micah Owings and young pitchers Travis Wood and Aroldis Chapman. Leake's contract was purchased on April 11, 2010. To make room for him, the Reds optioned Juan Francisco to the Louisville Bats, the Reds' Triple-A affiliate. They also designated Pedro Viola for assignment. Leake became the first player since Xavier Nady, when he was with the San Diego Padres in 2000, to go directly from the draft to the major leagues, and was the first starting pitcher to accomplish the feat since left-hander Jim Abbott of the California Angels in 1989. He also was the first Cincinnati Red to do so since the abolition of the Bonus Rule after the 1965 season (shortstop Bobby Henrich, pitcher Jay Hook, and catcher Don Pavletich, who did so in 1957, all were "Bonus Babies").

Leake made his major league debut on April 11, 2010, in a 3–1 victory against the Chicago Cubs. On May 15, 2010, Leake earned his fourth career win. With a career record of 4–0 at that point, he became the first Reds rookie starting pitcher to open 4–0 since Pat Zachry and Santo Alcalá did so in 1976. Leake became the first rookie pitcher in Reds' history to remain undefeated after his 10th start by throwing six innings of shutout ball on May 30, 2010, against the Houston Astros.

On June 5, 2010, against the Washington Nationals, Leake earned his fifth victory. With this win, Leake moved to 5–0 in his career and joined Santo Alcalá as the only rookies in Reds history to begin their careers with that record. Leake began to suffer from shoulder fatigue as the season progressed, and he was eventually put on the disabled list (DL). He came off the DL in mid-September and joined the Reds as part of expanded rosters but never pitched. He pinch hit once but was left off the team's postseason roster.

Leake did throw a bullpen session late in the month, but was determined to be not ready for pitching in the post season and effectively "shut down" once again. He did see action as a pinch-runner and pinch-hitter in the month after showing his hitting ability during the season.

==== 2011 ====
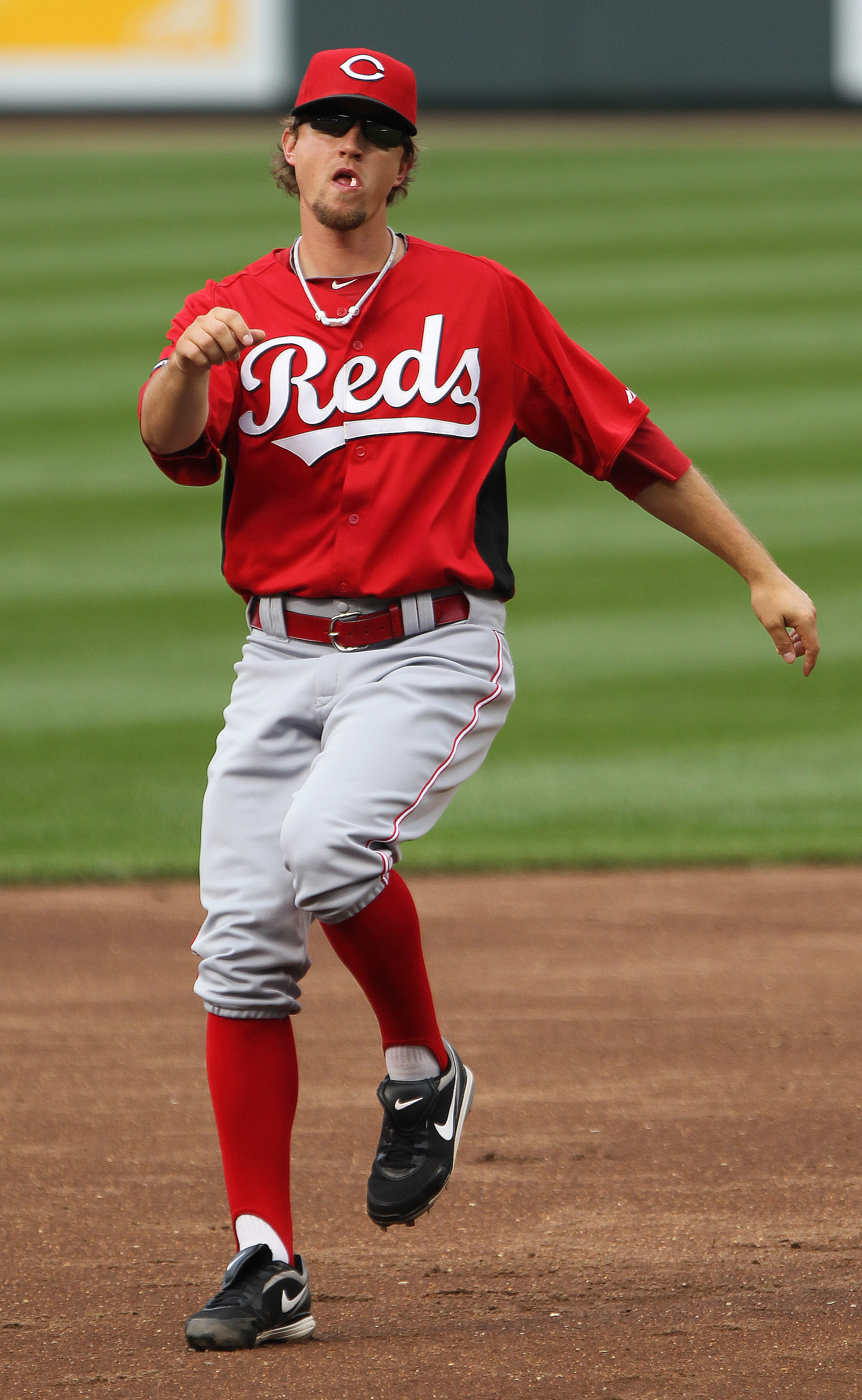
Leake in 2011

Entering spring training, Leake was considered the sixth man in the rotation, and faced starting the season in the minor leagues. However, Johnny Cueto and Homer Bailey both went on the DL, and Leake made the rotation out of spring. He won his first two decisions, posting a 5.40 ERA. Leake was optioned to triple-A for the first time in his career on May 14 to make room for reliever José Arredondo to come off the DL. Arredondo's rehab assignment had reached the maximum 30 days, he had pitched well, and was out of options. Leake was called back up on May 28 and started against the Braves, earning the win and pitching six innings of one-run ball.

==== 2012 ====
On May 21, 2012, Leake hit the first home run of his career, off Mike Minor of the Atlanta Braves in the fourth inning of a game at Great American Ball Park. On June 29, 2012, Leake threw his first complete game against the San Francisco Giants in a 5–1 victory. Leake made his first postseason appearance in the 4th game of the NLDS against the San Francisco Giants. Leake surrendered a leadoff home run to the first batter of the game, Ángel Pagán. The Giants would go on to win by a final of 8–3.

==== 2013–2015 ====
In 2013, Leake started 31 games, going 14–7 with a 3.37 ERA and 122 strikeouts over 192 1/3 innings. He started 33 games in 2014, going 11–13 with a 3.70 ERA and 164 strikeouts over 214 1/3 innings.

Leake began the 2015 season as the Reds #2 starter. In 21 starts for the Reds, Leake went 9–5 with a 3.56 ERA.

=== San Francisco Giants ===
On July 30, 2015, Leake was traded to the San Francisco Giants in exchange for pitching prospect Keury Mella and minor league third baseman Adam Duvall. Leake was scratched from his second scheduled start with the Giants due to a strained hamstring and was placed on the disabled list. On August 22 he was activated from the 15-day disabled list. Leake produced mostly disappointing results for the Giants. He was able to pitch at least six innings in seven of his nine starts but only able to win two of the nine games while posting a 4.07 earned run average.

=== St. Louis Cardinals ===
On December 22, 2015, Leake signed a five-year, $80 million contract with the St. Louis Cardinals. He was given jersey number 8, the same number he wore while playing for Arizona State.

==== 2016 ====
He made his Cardinals debut on April 6 against the Pittsburgh Pirates, allowing four runs and seven hits in 4 1/3 IP, resulting in being charged with the loss as Pittsburgh won, 5–1. He earned his first win a Cardinals uniform on May 10 against the Los Angeles Angels of Anaheim in an 8–1 advantage. In consecutive starts against the Milwaukee Brewers and San Diego Padres on July 10 and 18, he struck out at least ten batters in consecutive games for the first time in his career, after previously having two total ten-strikeout games in 189 starts. Covering his previous 48 2/3 innings, he had struck out 45 batters while walking three.

Overall, Leake struggled in his first season as a Cardinal, posting an ERA of 4.69, his highest ERA of his career. He finished 9–12 in 30 starts. He had the lowest left on base percentage of all major league pitchers, stranding only 65.6% of base runners.

==== 2017 ====
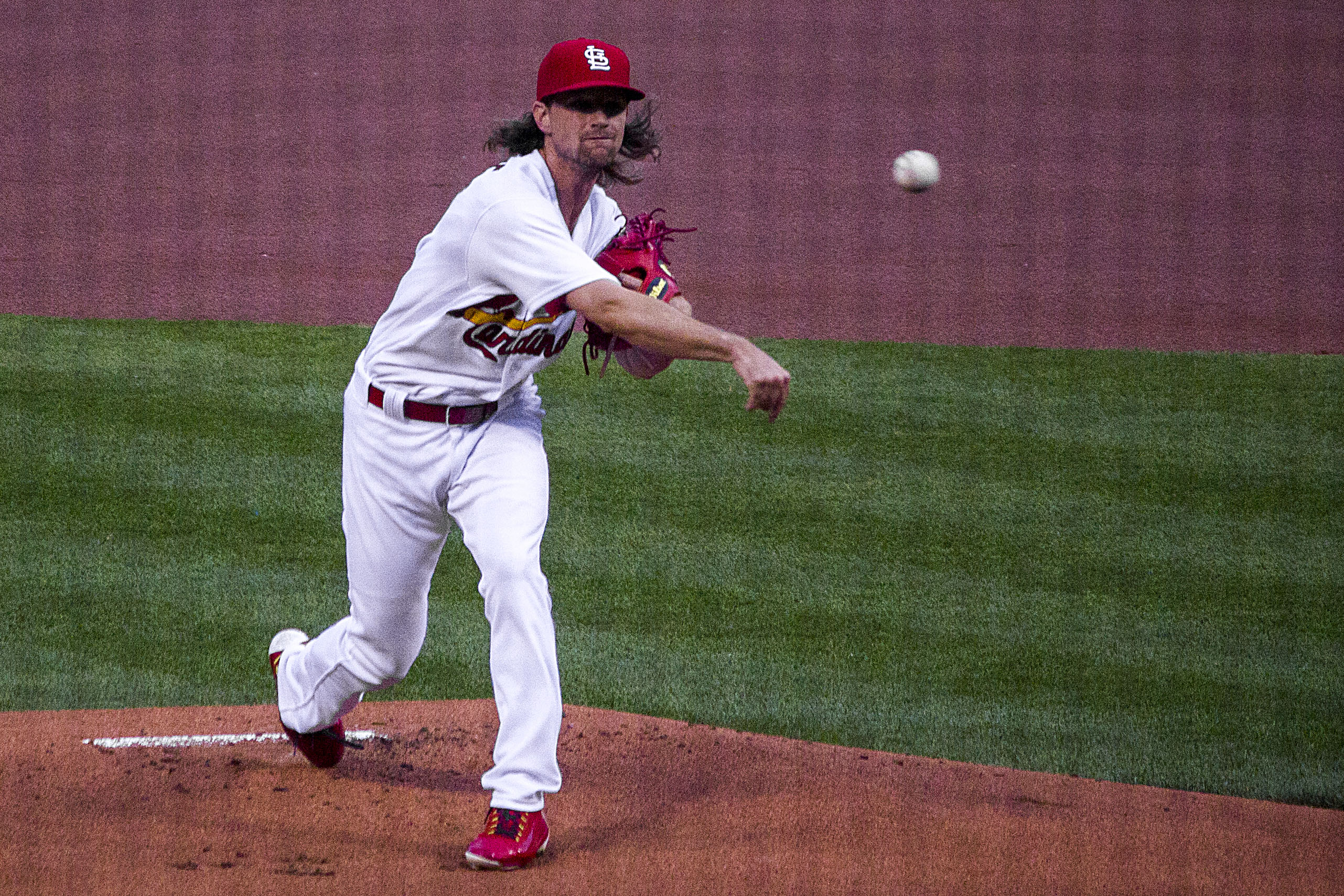
Leake in 2017

At the start of the season, Leake was 5–2 with a 1.91 ERA in 9 starts. From May 29 to August 26, Leake went 2–10. For the season with St. Louis, Leake finished 7–12 with a 4.21 ERA in 26 starts.

=== Seattle Mariners ===
==== 2017 ====
On August 30, 2017, the Cardinals traded Leake and international signing bonus space to the Seattle Mariners for Rayder Ascanio. He made his Mariners debut on September 1 against the Oakland Athletics, allowing only two earned runs on eight hits and a walk over seven innings to pick up his first win as a Mariner. In five starts with the Mariners, he finished strong with a 3–1 record with 2.53 ERA, 27 strikeouts, and 2 walks in 32 innings pitched.

==== 2018 ====
Leake started 31 games for the Mariners, finishing with a record of 10–10 with a 4.36 ERA in 185 2/3 innings. On May 4 against the Los Angeles Angels, Leake allowed Albert Pujols' 3,000th career hit. He had the fewest strikeouts per 9 innings in the major leagues (5.77), and he also led major league pitchers in highest contact percentage (84.8%) of batters against him. In addition, he led major league pitchers in percent of balls pulled against him (47.8%). Twelve batters reached base against him on an error, tops in the major leagues.

==== 2019 ====
On July 19, against the Angels, Leake took a perfect game through eight innings until allowing a leadoff hit by Luis Rengifo. He subsequently walked Kevan Smith, but got the next three batters out, held the shutout, and the Mariners won 10–0.

Leake closed his 2019 season with the Mariners having started 22 games, resulting in a 9–8 record and 4.27 ERA. He had two complete games and had a career-best 1.2 BB/9 during his 137 innings prior to being traded to the Diamondbacks.

=== Arizona Diamondbacks ===
==== 2019 ====
On July 31, 2019, Leake was traded to the Arizona Diamondbacks in exchange for José Caballero. Between the two teams, he led all major league pitchers in home runs allowed, with 41, and in hits, with 227.

==== 2020 ====
On June 29, 2020, Leake became the first player in MLB to announce he would not participate in the shortened 2020 season during the COVID-19 pandemic. Leake's agent, Dan Horwits, stated the decision was "not easy" for Leake and that he expected to play in 2021. Leake has not played major league baseball since 2019.

On October 28, 2020, the Diamondbacks declined an $18 million option on Leake's contract for the 2021 season, instead paying him a $5 million buyout, and he was declared a free agent.

=== Kevin Mather comments ===
In February 2021, Seattle Mariners' president Kevin Mather made a controversial speech to a local rotary club which ended up costing Mather his job with the team. One part of the speech which did not make headlines at the time concerned a certain former Mariners' pitcher: "Marco Gonzales has really taken a leadership role. One good story in 2019, we had a veteran pitcher, that we have since traded to the Arizona Diamondbacks (if you want to figure out who it is) who had a, you know, attitude. He’d been around, he’d been there, done that. And our bullpen coach was talking to the starting pitchers in spring training; he was talking about, you know, when you go out and throw your bullpens, you know, it’s only 20 pitches [so] let’s make sure it’s quality, and he was giving this speech. And the pitcher who’s no longer with us kind of rolled his eyes and said, 'Don’t tell me how to throw my bullpens yet.' As the meeting broke up, Marco Gonzales, with a help of a couple bullpen guys, pushed this particular pitcher into the locker and said, 'Listen, if you want to be a dick, be a dick, but do it quietly.' And, you know, for a young kid to do that, good for him. Good for him. And...it’s hard for a pitcher who only performs every fifth or sixth day to take a leadership role, but Marco has really kind of owned that." The only pitcher who fit Mather's description as having played for the Mariners in 2019 before being traded to the Diamondbacks is Mike Leake.

== Personal life ==
Leake and his wife, Catherine, have a son and a daughter together. They reside in Paradise Valley, Arizona.

On April 18, 2011, Leake was arrested by the Cincinnati Police for shoplifting six American Rag T-shirts worth $59.88 from the Macy's store in downtown Cincinnati, after he removed their price tags and tried to leave without paying for them. He had purchased an equal value of shirts earlier from Macy's, claimed he was trying to make an even exchange without talking to employees or going to customer service. Leake was charged with theft, a first-degree misdemeanor in Ohio that carried a maximum sentence of 180 days in jail if convicted. Leake had no known prior convictions. He pleaded guilty to a reduced charge of unauthorized use of property and entered a court-sponsored diversion program and was required to complete 30 hours of community service and counseling, upon which his case was dismissed. Leake apologized and called his mistake "a boneheaded move".

In 2013, Leake's father Chris suffered a fall off a roof that left him paralyzed from the waist down. This incident played a factor in Leake's desire to sign with the Diamondbacks before the 2016 season, and ultimately asking to be traded there at the 2019 trade deadline.

== Repertoire ==
Leake throws a sinkerball that averages around 90 miles per hour (140 km/h), a curveball, a changeup with an average speed of 81 miles per hour (130 km/h), a cutter, and a slider at around 85 miles per hour (137 km/h).

== See also ==
- Cincinnati Reds all-time roster
- List of baseball players who went directly to Major League Baseball
- San Francisco Giants all-time roster
- St. Louis Cardinals all-time roster
