= Marshall Harris =

American football player and artist (born 1955)

No. 90, 78
- Position: Defensive end

Personal information
- Born: December 6, 1955 (age 70); San Antonio, Texas, U.S.
- Listed height: 6 ft 6 in (1.98 m)
- Listed weight: 261 lb (118 kg)

Career information
- High school: Southwest (Fort Worth, Texas)
- College: TCU
- NFL draft: 1979: 8th round, 198th overall pick

Career history
- Cleveland Browns (1980–1982); New England Patriots (1983); New Jersey Generals (1984)

Awards and highlights
- Second-team All-SWC (1978)

Career NFL statistics
- Sacks: 6
- Fumble recoveries: 2
- Stats at Pro Football Reference

Marshall K. Harris (born December 6, 1955) is an American artist and former professional football player.

== Early life and education ==
Harris grew up in Fort Worth, Texas, and graduated from Southwest High School in 1974. After earning all-district honors as a football player at Southwest, he was offered athletic scholarships from several colleges but ultimately chose to stay in Fort Worth to study art at Texas Christian University. He also followed in the footsteps of his father, who had helped lead TCU to Southwest Conference titles in 1958 and 1959, by playing football for the Horned Frogs.

During his time at TCU, Harris designed the "Flying T" logo that was featured on the Frogs' helmets and served as the university's primary athletic logo until the early '90s.

== Professional football ==
The New York Jets selected Harris 198th overall in the eighth round of the 1979 NFL draft, though he never appeared in a game for the team after walking out of training camp and finding a job in commercial art that fall. He was traded the next year to the Cleveland Browns, where he became a starter and helped the team reach the playoffs in both 1980 and 1982. Harris joined the New England Patriots for the 1983 season before signing with the USFL's New Jersey Generals, who were owned by future U.S. president Donald Trump.

== Art ==
Following the conclusion of his football career, Harris worked in various graphic design roles in the marketing and advertising industries. His experience of being in New York City during the September 11 attacks in 2001 led to a decision to lend his skills to his own work rather than creating art for other people.

After earning an MFA from the University of the Arts in Philadelphia, Harris moved back to his hometown of Fort Worth, where he experimented with morbid artwork that included photographs from obituaries as well as toe tags. Many of his works also evoke Western themes – in 2013, he was awarded the prestigious Hunting Art Prize for his life-size photorealist graphite drawing titled Round Up: B.F. Smith & Son Saddlery Circa 1940–1942.
