= Nick Koback =

American baseball player (1935–2015)

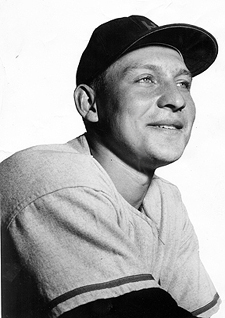
- Koback as a member of the Pittsburgh Pirates, c. 1950s
- Catcher
- Born: July 19, 1935; Hartford, Connecticut, U.S.
- Died: January 23, 2015 (aged 79); Hartford, Connecticut, U.S.
- Batted: Right Threw: Right

MLB debut
- July 29, 1953, for the Pittsburgh Pirates

Last MLB appearance
- July 4, 1955, for the Pittsburgh Pirates

MLB statistics
- Batting average: .121
- Hits: 4
- Stats at Baseball Reference

Teams
- Pittsburgh Pirates (1953–1955)

Nicholas Nicholie Koback (July 19, 1935 – January 23, 2015) was a Russian American professional baseball player whose career spanned eight seasons, three of which were spent with the Major League Baseball (MLB) Pittsburgh Pirates (1953–55). At the age of 17, Koback signed with the Pirates as a bonus baby out of Hartford Public High School. He made his MLB debut without ever playing in the minor leagues. At the time, he was the youngest Pittsburgh Pirates player ever. During his first career start, Koback caught a complete game shutout by Pirates pitcher Murry Dickson. Most of Koback's time with Pittsburgh was spent as a bullpen catcher. Over his three-year MLB career, Koback compiled a .121 batting average with one run scored, four hits, one triple and one base on balls in 16 games played. The majority of his playing career was spent in the minor leagues with the Lincoln Chiefs (1955, 1958), Williamsport Grays (1956), Hollywood Stars (1956–57), New Orleans Pelicans (1956–57), Columbus/Gastonia Pirates (1958) and Charleston Senators (1960). He batted and threw right-handed. During his career, he weighed 187 pounds (85 kg) and stood at 6 feet (180 cm). After retiring from baseball, Koback played pro–am golf in Connecticut.

== Early life ==
Nicholas Nicholie "Nick" Koback was born on July 19, 1935, in Hartford, Connecticut, to Nickolai Koback, who was a naturalized citizen of the United States originally from Russia. He worked at the Hartford Machine Screw Company. Nick Koback attended Hartford Public High School where he played baseball. During his sophomore season, his school's team won the Triangular League championship.

In May 1952, Koback missed playing time for his high school team due to a broken finger. He also played guard on the school's basketball team. Koback graduated from Hartford Public High School in June 1953.

== Baseball career ==
=== Pittsburgh Pirates (1953–55) ===
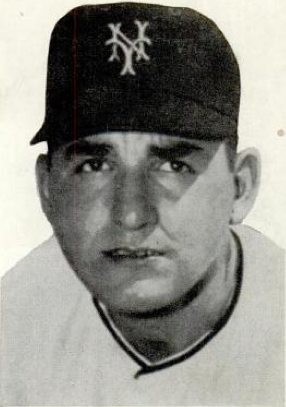
On August 30, 1953, during a pinch hit at-bat, Koback hit his first career MLB triple, which would later prove to be his only career MLB extra-base hit, off Milwaukee Braves pitcher Johnny Antonelli (pictured).

On July 9, 1953, after being scouted by Ed McCarrick, Koback was signed by the Major League Baseball (MLB) Pittsburgh Pirates out of high school. Koback received contract offers from the Boston Red Sox, Brooklyn Dodgers, Chicago Cubs and New York Giants who wanted to start him out in the minor leagues, but he declined after Pittsburgh offered the most money. Koback later said in an interview with The Pittsburgh Press that "Money looks awful big to an 18-year-old". Koback was signed under the Bonus Rule which at the time stated that he had to be on the Pirates roster for two years.

To fit Koback on the roster, Pirates general manager Branch Rickey released pitcher Bob Schultz. The official sum of his contract was not initially disclosed. However, his contract was later valued at US$20,000. Upon joining the Pittsburgh club, Koback went through a three-day training program with Pirates coaches. He made his MLB debut on July 29, without ever playing in the minor leagues, as a pinch hitter for catcher Mike Sandlock against the St. Louis Cardinals at Busch Stadium. In both of his at-bats he had over the night, Koback went hitless against St. Louis pitcher Harvey Haddix. Koback was the youngest Pittsburgh player ever at 18 years and 10 days old when he made his MLB debut. He got the first start of his career on July 31, against the Chicago Cubs at Wrigley Field. During that game, Koback caught the entire game, which was a complete game shutout by Pirates pitcher Murry Dickson. Koback got his first MLB hit that game against Cubs pitcher Paul Minner. In his next game on August 1, against the Cubs, Koback got his first career sacrifice hit. In mid-August, Pirates manager Fred Haney stated that Koback "is a good receiver but he's only a kid". During the first game of a doubleheader against the Milwaukee Braves on August 30, Koback served as a pinch hitter for pitcher Roger Bowman when he got his first career MLB triple off pitcher Johnny Antonelli. Koback's final game of the season came on September 26, against the New York Giants at Forbes Field. In that game, he started as the catcher going hitless in three at-bats.

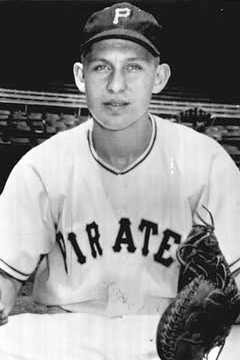
Under the Bonus Rule, Koback was a member of the Pittsburgh Pirates MLB roster for his first two seasons.

After the 1953 season, Koback played amateur baseball on pitcher Spec Shea's traveling team. After returning to his home-town from Pittsburgh, Pennsylvania, Kocack was asked if he felt any homesickness during the season, to which he replied, "Homesick? I was too busy and too excited to be homesick". While in Hartford for the off-season, Koback was the guest of honor at a Hartford Public High School sports rally. He gave a speech to local fire fighters, which was received positively according to The Hartford Courant. In mid-January 1954, the Pittsburgh Pirates held a workout for incoming rookies and younger players, in which Koback took part. The 1954 season would be the last year he would be protected by the Bonus Rule. Before the start of the season, United Press International stated that Koback and his teammate Vic Janowicz were a problem for the Pirates because "neither [were] ready for full-time duty".

Koback made his season debut on July 11, as a pinch hitter for catcher Toby Atwell in a game against the New York Giants. Koback's second game of the season came on July 17, as a pinch hitter for catcher Jack Shepard in a game against the Chicago Cubs. On July 25, the Sunday Herald's sports editor Sam Cohen wrote a scathing critique of the Bonus Rule, which he stated "[the rule] we feel hampers rather than aids the costly prospects' development, because in practically every case, they see so little action". Cohen went on to use Koback as an example of how the rule is "detrimental" to the development of young players. During his third game on September 22, against the Philadelphia Phillies, Koback started as the catcher going hitless in three at-bats. On September 26, Koback made his final appearance of the season against the Brooklyn Dodgers, where in three at-bats he went hitless. In four games that season, he went hitless in 10 at-bats. Defensively, Koback played all of his four games as catcher. Of those four games, two were starts. He made 14 putouts.

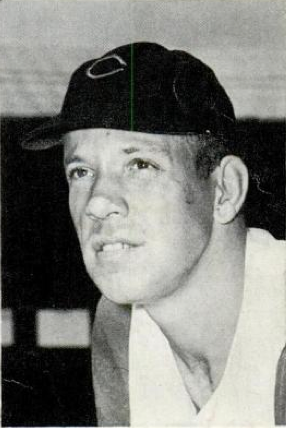
Koback got his first hit of the 1955 season off of Cincinnati Reds pitcher Joe Nuxhall (pictured).

Koback re-signed with the Pittsburgh Pirates on January 15, 1955. He made his season debut on May 17, against the Cincinnati Reds at Crosley Field. During his appearance, which was as a pinch hitter for pitcher Nellie King, Koback got one hit, a single, in one at-bat against Reds pitcher Joe Nuxhall.

Koback recalled a conversation he had with then-rookie Roberto Clemente during the 1955 season, saying, "Sometimes [Clemente] would come out on the field and bullshit with me. He'd say, 'Hey you—strong guy!'" On June 5, Koback played both games of a doubleheader against Cincinnati. In the first game, he appeared as a defensive replacement as the catcher. In his only at-bat that game, which was against Reds pitcher Johnny Klippstein, Koback flied out. Koback started the second game of the doubleheader.

During his second at-bat of the game, Koback hit a single off Reds pitcher Jackie Collum, which would later prove to be the last hit of Koback's MLB career. Koback's fourth appearance of the season came on June 19, against the Cincinnati Reds. During that game, he served as a pinch-hitter for pitcher Dick Littlefield in the seventh inning. Koback's final MLB appearance came on July 4, against the New York Giants. In that game, he served as a pinch hitter for pitcher Lino Donoso and struck-out in one at-bat. Over his career with the Pirates, Koback primarily served as a bullpen catcher. In his five games that season, he batted .286 with two hits in seven at-bats. Behind the plate, Koback made no errors, one assist and four putouts.

=== Later career (1955–1960) ===
On July 12, 1955, the Pittsburgh Pirates sold Koback to the minor league Lincoln Chiefs of the Class-A Western League. The Chiefs, who represented Lincoln, Nebraska, were managed by former St. Louis Browns and Pittsburgh Pirates pitcher Bill Burwell. His teammates featured past and future MLB players Bill Bell, Joe Christopher, Bennie Daniels, Dick Hall, Cholly Naranjo, Earl Smith, Jim Waugh and George Witt. With the Lincoln club that season, Koback batted .223 with 23 hits, five doubles and two triples in 38 games played. In November 1955, Koback was assigned to the minor league Hollywood Stars of the Pacific Coast League, which was to be under an open classification in 1956. His manager with the Stars was long-time minor league player and manager Clay Hopper. Most of Koback's teammates on the Stars had major league experience one time or another over their careers. He played with Hollywood during their season opener on April 10, 1956. With the Starts that season, Koback batted .176 with three hits and three runs batted in (RBIs) in 10 games played. Defensively, Koback had a perfect 1.000 fielding percentage in 42 total chances. In early-May, Koback was farmed out to the minor league New Orleans Pelicans of the Double-A Southern Association. In five games played with the Pelicans under the management of Andy Cohen, Koback accumulated one hit. Later in May, he was again sent to another team, this time it was the Williamsport Grays of the Class-A Eastern League. The manager of Williamsport was John Fitzpatrick, a long-time minor league player and manager. With the Grays that season, Koback batted .313 with 62 hits, 16 doubles and two home runs in 68 games played.

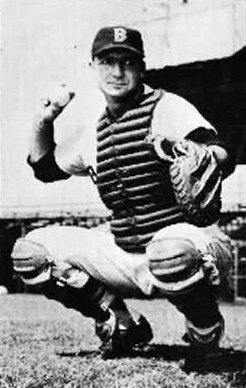
Del Wilber (pictured) served as Koback's manager during his final professional baseball season in 1960.

In October 1956, Koback joined the Venados de Mazatlán of the Mexican Pacific League. On March 1, 1957, Koback played a charity game as a member of the Hartford, Connecticut Young Democrats against the Hartford Young Republicans. Koback began the 1957 season with the Hollywood Stars. Koback batted .167 with five hits, one of which was a double, in 11 games played. In the field, he had a perfect 1.000 fielding percentage in 52 total chances. In May, Koback was farmed out to the Mobile Bears of the Double-A Southern Association. He later joined the New Orleans Pelicans, also of the Southern Association. Koback batted .230 with 28 hits, six of which were doubles, in 41 games played. Before the start of the 1958 season, Koback joined the minor league Salt Lake City Bees of the Pacific Coast League. However, before the start of the regular season, Koback broke his finger. By May, Koback was played for the minor league Lincoln Chiefs of the Class-A Western League. Monty Basgall, a former MLB player, was Koback's manager that season. On the season, he batted .240 with 54 hits, four doubles, four triples and three home runs in 68 games played.

After the 1958 season, Koback enlisted in the Nebraska National Guard and took up primary residence in that state. He spent the entire 1959 season with the minor league Pirates who represented Columbus, Georgia, and Gastonia, North Carolina. The Pirates, who were members of the Class-A South Atlantic League, were managed by former MLB pitcher Ray Hathaway. On the season, Koback batted .226 with 18 runs scored, 30 hits, six doubles, two triples, three home runs and 30 RBIs in 50 games played. Defensively, he made four errors, had 21 assists and 188 putouts. In April, Koback was traded by the Salt Lake City Bees, who still owned his contract, to the minor league Charleston Senators in exchange for outfielder Chick King. The Senators, who were members of the Triple-A American Association, were managed by Del Wilber, a former MLB player. Koback played five games with the Senators that season. In those games, he went hitless in four at-bats. That season would later prove to be his final in professional baseball.

== Later life ==
After his baseball career was over, Koback took up golf. In 1965, he began to work as a golf instructor at Goodwin Park in Hartford, Connecticut. Koback participated in the Keney Park Invitation in May 1966. He served as the assistant to Harry Nettelblatt at the Golf Club of Avon. Koback won a pro–am tournament at Cliffside Country Club in Hartford, Connecticut in June 1969. In 1970, Koback was named the assistant to Bud Cordone at the Pequot Golf Club. Koback was inducted in the Hartford Public High School Athletic Hall of Fame in 2004 for his contributions to the school's baseball team in the early 1950s. By 2006, Koback was living in Weatogue, Connecticut.

Koback died January 23, 2015, aged 79.
