= Dave Hill (baseball) =

American baseball player (1937–2018)

Dave Burnham Hill
- Pitcher
- Born: November 11, 1937; New Orleans, Louisiana, U.S.
- Died: October 16, 2018 (aged 80); Lakeland, Florida, U.S.
- Batted: Right Threw: Left

MLB debut
- August 22, 1957, for the Kansas City Athletics

Last MLB appearance
- August 26, 1957, for the Kansas City Athletics

MLB statistics
- Win–loss record: 0–0
- Earned run average: 27.00
- Strikeouts: 1
- Innings pitched: 2 1/3
- Stats at Baseball Reference

Teams
- Kansas City Athletics (1957)

David Burnham Hill (November 11, 1937 – October 16, 2018) was an American professional baseball player, a pitcher who appeared in two games in the Major Leagues for the 1957 Kansas City Athletics. Hill attended Northwestern University; he threw left-handed, batted right-handed, and was listed as 6 feet 2 inches (1.88 m) tall and 170 pounds (77 kg).

Hill signed with the Athletics in 1957 as a "Bonus Baby", under the Bonus Rule. He debuted for the As without playing in the minor leagues on August 22 in relief against the defending world champion New York Yankees and surrendered a two-run home run to eventual Baseball Hall of Famer Yogi Berra during an 11–4 Kansas City loss. Four days later he was treated roughly by the Boston Red Sox, also in relief, surrendering five runs (including homers to Frank Malzone and Jimmy Piersall) in only one-third of an inning. Boston routed the As, 16–0.

In 2 1/3 big-league innings pitched, Hill allowed six hits, three bases on balls, and seven earned runs. He struck out one.

He played in the Kansas City farm system from 1958 to 1961, rising to the middle level of the minors, before retiring. After retiring, Hill earned a master's degree from Loyola University and had a successful career in telecommunications. In his final years, he owned and operated Wickwire Art Gallery (Hendersonville, NC) with his wife of over 46 years. He was the father of three children and grandfather of nine. Hill maintained a love for baseball all of his life.

Hill died peacefully on October 16, 2018, after a brief battle with cancer.

== See also ==
- List of baseball players who went directly to Major League Baseball
