= Frances Kinne =

American author (1917–2020)

7th President of Jacksonville University
- In office 1979–1989
- Preceded by: Robert H. Spiro Jr.
- Succeeded by: James J. Brady Jr.

Personal details
- Born: Frances Bartlett; May 23, 1917 Story City, Iowa, U.S.
- Died: May 10, 2020 (aged 102) Jacksonville, Florida, U.S.
- Spouse(s): Harry L. Kinne (m. 1948; died 1981) M. Worthington Bordley (m. 1992)
- Education: Drake University (BA); University of Frankfurt (PhD)
- Website: Jacksonville University Frances Kinne Page

Frances Bartlett Kinne (May 23, 1917 – May 10, 2020) was an American author, academic administrator, and musician. She was the first female university president to hold that position in the state of Florida, and the second in the United States.

== Early life and education ==
Frances Kinne was born on May 23, 1917, in Story City, Iowa to Bertha Olson Bartlett and Charles M. Bartlett. She graduated high school in 1934 and attended the Iowa State Teachers College (now University of Northern Iowa). Kinne received piano lessons at Iowa State University during the summers for free. She later attended Drake University and received her Bachelors of Music Education during the start of World War II. During World War II, she served as a United States Army hostess for the United Service Organizations for three years. In 1957, she graduated from the University of Frankfurt, West Germany with a PhD in Music, English Literature, and Philosophy.

== Career ==
In 1958, Kinne moved to St. Augustine, Florida and became an Assistant Professor of Humanities at Jacksonville University, after being recruited by then-University President Franklyn A. Johnson. She founded the University's College of Fine Arts in 1960 and was named Professor of the Year in both 1961 and 1962. The Business and Professional Women's Clubs of Greater Jacksonville granted her the Distinguished Achievement Award. During her oversight in the 1960s, JU art majors grew by 42%. In 1969, she was chosen to become the first female Dean of a college in the United States, appointed as Dean of the JU College of Fine Arts.

In 1973, Kinne received the first awarded Florida Governor's Award For The Arts. She was appointed acting President of Jacksonville University in 1979 after JU President Rob Spiro was asked to resign by the Board of Trustees. While acting President, Kinne established the School of Business and received the EVE of the Decade Award from the Florida Publishing Company.

Kinne was inaugurated as the permanent President of Jacksonville University in 1980 and eliminated the University's debt within 18 months of her appointment. During this time, she approved the creation of a new School of Nursing at the University, which graduated its first nursing students in 1983. Kinne launched JU's 50-year Golden Anniversary Campaign in 1983 and successfully raised $16 Million.

In 1986, she was added to the Florida Women's Hall of Fame and appointed by U.S. President Ronald Reagan to chair the President's Council of the Independent Colleges and Universities of Florida. Kinne retired as President of Jacksonville University in 1989 and was immediately elected to become the first Chancellor of Jacksonville University by the Board of Trustees.

On November 1, 2012, the City of Jacksonville proclaimed Dr. Frances Bartlett Kinne Day. At Jacksonville Business Journal's 12th annual Women of Influence Awards, she received the lifetime achievement award.

== Personal life ==
Kinne married her first husband, Colonel Harry L. Kinne, in 1948. He died of cancer at the Mayo Clinic in Jacksonville, Florida on April 26, 1981.

She married Colonel M. Worthington Bordley in 1992.

Kinne published a memoir of her life in 2000 titled Iowa Girl: The President Wears A Skirt. Kinne died in Jacksonville, Florida on May 10, 2020, at the age of 102.

== See also ==
- Jacksonville University
- Jim Brady
