= Harry MacPherson =

American baseball player (1926-2017)

- Pitcher
- Born: July 10, 1926; North Andover, Massachusetts, U.S.
- Died: February 19, 2017 (aged 90); Englewood, Florida, U.S.
- Batted: Right Threw: Right

MLB debut
- August 14, 1944, for the Boston Braves

Last MLB appearance
- August 14, 1944, for the Boston Braves

MLB statistics
- Win–loss record: 0–0
- Earned run average: 0.00
- Strikeouts: 1
- Stats at Baseball Reference

Teams
- Boston Braves (1944)

Harry William MacPherson (July 10, 1926 – February 19, 2017) was an American right-handed pitcher who appeared in one game for the Boston Braves in 1944. At the age of 18, he was the eighth-youngest player to appear in a National League game that season. He was born in North Andover, Massachusetts.

MacPherson is one of many ballplayers who only appeared in the major leagues during World War II. On August 14, 1944, he came in to pitch the bottom of the eighth inning of a road game that the Braves lost to the Pittsburgh Pirates 5–0. Facing four batters, he allowed one walk and no runs in his one inning of work. His lifetime ERA stands at 0.00.

MacPherson served in the United States Navy during World War II. He died February 19, 2017, in Englewood, Florida.

== See also ==
- List of baseball players who went directly to Major League Baseball
