= Brian Milner =

American baseball player (born 1959)

- Catcher
- Born: November 17, 1959 (age 66); Fort Worth, Texas
- Batted: Right Threw: Right

MLB debut
- June 23, 1978, for the Toronto Blue Jays

Last MLB appearance
- June 26, 1978, for the Toronto Blue Jays

MLB statistics
- Batting average: .444
- Home runs: 0
- Runs batted in: 2
- Stats at Baseball Reference

Teams
- Toronto Blue Jays (1978)

Brian Tate Milner (born November 17, 1959) is an American former professional baseball player. He played two games in Major League Baseball (MLB) for the Toronto Blue Jays in 1978 as a catcher.

== Biography ==
Milner attended Southwest High School in Fort Worth, Texas, where he played baseball and football. He planned to attend Arizona State University, but was selected in the seventh round of the 1978 MLB draft, held June 6–8, by the Toronto Blue Jays. He signed with Toronto on June 17 after being offered a $150,000 signing bonus and the opportunity to join the MLB team immediately.

Milner joined the Blue Jays the next day, but did not make his major-league debut until June 23, in a road game against the Cleveland Indians. He became the first, and to date only, catcher to be brought directly to the major leagues after being signed since the MLB draft began in 1965, and the first Blue Jays player to do so. Making his debut at the age of 18 years, seven months, and six days, he remains the youngest person to play for the team. Milner played in two games for Toronto in June 1978, getting four hits, including a triple, in nine at bats—he scored three runs and had two runs batted in (RBIs).

Milner was sent down to the rookie league Medicine Hat Blue Jays shortly thereafter, where he had a .307 batting average. He played four more seasons in Minor League Baseball, but suffered a series of injuries and never played in the major leagues again.

Following the end of his playing career, Milner ran a landscaping business in Fort Worth until 1990. He later served as a coach in the New York Yankees organization during 1991–1995, and as a scout for the Chicago Cubs during 1996–2007. One of the players he signed for Chicago was Eric Hinske. Milner later earned a business degree from Tarleton State University in 2009, and became a high school teacher.

Milner is the father of major-league pitcher Hoby Milner.

== See also ==
- List of baseball players who went directly to Major League Baseball
