= Dan Horwits =

American sports agent

Dan Horwits is an American sports agent, certified by the Major League Baseball Players Association. He is currently a partner at Beverly Hills Sports Council, a sports agency located in Los Angeles that represents Major League Baseball players. Beverly Hills Sports Council was ranked in a recent publishing by Forbes.com as the 10th most valuable MLB agency.

== Background ==
Horwits earned his undergraduate degree from Brandeis University, where he played Division III baseball and basketball, and his law degree from Loyola Law School. He began as an intern at Beverly Hills Sports Council while still attending law school.

== Career ==
Horwits eventually became part-owner of the agency, and personally represented players including John Franco, Keith Foulke, Jason Isringhausen, Arthur Rhodes John Axford, and Ryan Ludwick. He is an expert at baseball’s arbitration process and has prepared hundreds of cases.

In January 2000, Horwits and New York Mets general manager Steve Phillips agreed to restructure the last year of outfielder Bobby Bonilla’s contract so he would become a free agent. The $5.9m salary would be deferred and later reported to be $1.19m paid to Bonilla every year from 2011 to 2035.

In April 2014, his client Jason Kipnis signed a 6-year $52.5m extension with the Cleveland Indians.

On December 22, 2015, his client Mike Leake signed a 5-year $80 million contract with the St. Louis Cardinals, after talks with general manager John Mozeliak began only a week and a half earlier.
