= Tim Conroy =

American baseball player (born 1960)

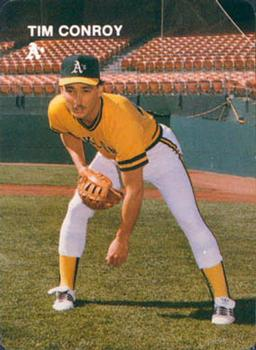
- Pitcher
- Born: April 3, 1960 (age 65); Monroeville, Pennsylvania, U.S.
- Batted: Left Threw: Left

MLB debut
- June 23, 1978, for the Oakland Athletics

Last MLB appearance
- June 16, 1987, for the St. Louis Cardinals

MLB statistics
- Win–loss record: 18–32
- Earned run average: 4.69
- Strikeouts: 307
- Stats at Baseball Reference

Teams
- Oakland Athletics (1978, 1982–1985); St. Louis Cardinals (1986–1987)

Timothy James Conroy (born April 3, 1960) is an American former professional baseball player and scout. He played in Major League Baseball as a left-handed pitcher for the Oakland Athletics (1978 and 1982–85) and St. Louis Cardinals (1986–87). He was the first person born in the 1960s to make his MLB debut.

== Career ==
Conroy was the Oakland Athletics' first round draft pick after graduating from Gateway Senior High School in Monroeville, Pennsylvania in 1978. He was immediately called up by the A's that June with no minor league pitching experience.

Conroy spent most of the 1985 season with the Tacoma Tigers where he had 22 starts, an 11–3 record and 167 strikeouts in 129 innings. His 16 appearances with the Athletics included two starts but no wins. He was traded along with Mike Heath from the Athletics to the Cardinals for Joaquín Andújar during the Winter Meetings on December 10, 1985.

In seven seasons he had an 18–32 win–loss record, 135 games (71 started) played, 5 complete games, 1 shutout, 21 games finished, 466 2/3 innings pitched, 438 hits allowed, 279 runs allowed, 244 earned runs allowed, 47 home runs allowed, 284 walks, 307 strikeouts, 10 hit batsmen, 31 wild pitches, 2,082 batters faced, 13 intentional walks, 2 balks and a 4.69 ERA. His WHIP was 1.547.

He is currently a scout for the Kansas City Royals.

== See also ==
- List of baseball players who went directly to Major League Baseball
