= Jim Brady (baseball) =

American athlete, economist, and educator (1936–2024)

8th President of Jacksonville University
- In office 1989–1996
- Preceded by: Frances Kinne
- Succeeded by: Paul S. Tipton
- Pitcher
- Born: March 2, 1936; Jersey City, New Jersey, U.S.
- Died: August 18, 2024 (aged 88); Jacksonville, Florida, U.S.
- Batted: Left Threw: Left

MLB debut
- May 12, 1956, for the Detroit Tigers

Last MLB appearance
- August 2, 1956, for the Detroit Tigers

MLB statistics
- Win–loss record: 0–0
- Earned run average: 28.42
- Innings pitched: 61/3
- Strikeouts: 3
- Stats at Baseball Reference

Teams
- Detroit Tigers (1956)

James Joseph Brady Jr. (March 2, 1936 – August 18, 2024) was an American economist, university educator and administrator, and pitcher in professional baseball. A native of Jersey City, New Jersey, he attended and earned three degrees from the University of Notre Dame.

Brady was the eighth president of Jacksonville University (1989–96), after service as dean of both the university's College of Arts and Sciences and Davis College of Business. Prior to that, he held the department chair in economics at Old Dominion University and was a member of the economics faculty of his alma mater, Notre Dame.

As a baseball player, the 6 ft 2 in (1.88 m), 185 lb (84 kg) Brady was signed off his college campus as an undergraduate by the Detroit Tigers as a $37,500 "bonus baby" in 1955. Detroit's farm system director, John McHale, was a Notre Dame alumnus and Brady promised his father he would return to college to complete his education when he signed his contract. Under the terms of the bonus rule then in effect, however, Brady was forced to spend the first two years of his pro career on a Major League roster.

Nicknamed "Diamond Jim" because of his bonus status, Brady missed the 1955 season due to an injury, then made his MLB debut on May 12, 1956, hurling a perfect ninth inning against the Chicago White Sox in a 7–6 loss at Briggs Stadium. A week later, he pitched another scoreless inning against the Baltimore Orioles, but was treated roughly in his next four appearances, surrendering 20 earned runs on 15 hits and ten bases on balls in only 4 1/3 innings of work.

He made only those six appearances, all in relief, during the season, then was sent to the minors for good in 1957. He retired as an active player after appearing in eight games for the 1961 Knoxville Smokies of the Class A Sally League.

According to Jacksonville University, as of 2011, Brady was an arbitrator in North Florida. Brady died in Jacksonville on August 18, 2024, at the age of 88.

== See also ==
- List of baseball players who went directly to Major League Baseball
