= Charlie Faust =

American baseball player (1880–1915)

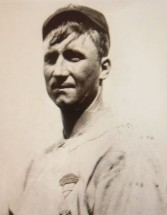
- Faust with the New York Giants
- Pitcher
- Born: October 9, 1880; Marion, Kansas
- Died: June 18, 1915 (aged 34); Steilacoom, Washington
- Batted: Right Threw: Right

MLB debut
- October 7, 1911, for the New York Giants

Last MLB appearance
- October 12, 1911, for the New York Giants

MLB statistics
- Games pitched: 2
- Win–loss record: 0–0
- Earned run average: 4.50
- Stats at Baseball Reference

Teams
- New York Giants (1911)

Charles Victor "Victory" Faust (October 9, 1880 – June 18, 1915) was an American Major League Baseball pitcher. Regarded as a good-luck charm, Faust helped the New York Giants win the 1911 National League championship.

== Major League Baseball career ==
Faust was born in Marion, Kansas, in 1880. In July 1911, he went to St. Louis and visited John McGraw, the manager of the New York Giants. Faust told McGraw that a fortuneteller said he would help the Giants win the championship. As a joke, McGraw gave Faust a tryout, and he was eventually allowed to stay due to the team's sudden winning streak that commenced after his arrival. The Giants had a record of 36–2 that season when Faust was in uniform; when he was not there, they struggled. Faust wanted to pitch in a real game, but having little athletic ability, he was relegated to warming up with the team on the field. After the Giants clinched the pennant, Faust pitched in the ninth inning of two games, allowing one run and stealing two bases.

The following season, the Giants started 54–11 with Faust. He still wanted to pitch, however, McGraw grew tired of him. Faust was permanently dismissed from the team. Without him, the Giants saw their hot streak end, but they did win the pennant again.

== Later life ==
Faust moved to California and then to Seattle. In 1914, still intent on rejoining the Giants, he walked to Portland and was sent to a mental hospital, where he was diagnosed with dementia. Later that year, he was sent to the Western State Hospital. He died there of tuberculosis in 1915. Six years after his death, the Giants won the World Series.

Faust's story was revived in the 1960s, when one of his Giants teammates, Fred Snodgrass, talked about him in an interview for The Glory of Their Times. Faust is also mentioned in E. L. Doctorow's novel Ragtime.

== See also ==
- List of baseball players who went directly to Major League Baseball
