= Earl Smith (1950s outfielder) =

American baseball player (1928–2014)

- Center fielder
- Born: March 14, 1928; Sunnyside, Washington, U.S.
- Died: September 27, 2014 (aged 86); Fresno, California, U.S.
- Batted: Right Threw: Right

MLB debut
- April 14, 1955, for the Pittsburgh Pirates

Last MLB appearance
- April 29, 1955, for the Pittsburgh Pirates

MLB statistics
- Batting average: .063
- Runs: 1
- Games played: 5
- Stats at Baseball Reference

Teams
- Pittsburgh Pirates (1955)

Earl Calvin Smith (March 14, 1928 – September 27, 2014) was an American center fielder in Major League Baseball who played for the Pittsburgh Pirates in their 1955 season. Listed at 6 feet 0 inches (1.83 m) and weighed 185 pounds (84 kilograms), he batted and threw right handed.

Born in Sunnyside, Washington, Smith moved along with his family to Southern California when he was eight. He graduated in 1946 from Bonita High School in La Verne, California.

The Pittsburgh organization signed Smith in 1949 out of Fresno State University, where he was a two-sport star and shined most as a slugging outfielder for the Bulldogs until his graduation. He saw action in all of parts of seven Minor League seasons spanning 1949–1955, before joining the Pirates on April 14, 1955 as a 27-year-old rookie.

His most productive in the minors came in 1954, when he posted a .387 batting average with 32 home runs and led the Arizona–Texas League with 195 runs batted in, helping the Phoenix Stars clinch the pennant title, earning All-Star Team honors for his stellar 1954 campaign.

He then made five game appearances at Pittsburgh over a two-week span in which he got one hit in 16 at-bats for a .063 average, scoring a run while striking out twice and walking four times for a .286 on-base percentage. Smith played his final game on April 29, 1955; four days later, he was optioned to New Orleans of the Southern Association. Smith would be the last Pirates player to wear uniform No. 21, other than his fellow rookie, future Hall of Fame outfielder Roberto Clemente, who had started the season as No.13.

Smith would try one more Minor League season in 1956, hitting a .294 average and 10 homers in 102 games for three teams at two different levels. Overall, he hit a .299 (BA)/.324 (OBP)/.456 (SLG) line and 93 home runs in 830 games.

After baseball, Smith returned to his home of Fresno, California and owned a grocery store before committing himself to his almond ranch east of Fresno. In 1998, he gained induction into the Fresno Athletic Hall of Fame.

In 2011 Smith was diagnosed with myelodysplastic syndromes, a type of cancer in which the bone marrow does not make enough healthy blood cells.

Smith died in 2014 in Fresno at the age of 86, following complications related to his illness. He is survived by Betty Smith, his wife of 65 years, their children Joan, Richard and Lisa, five grandsons, one great-granddaughter and two great-grandsons.
