= Frank Zupo =

American baseball player (1939-2005)

- Catcher
- Born: August 29, 1939; San Francisco, California, U.S.
- Died: March 25, 2005 (aged 65); Palo Alto, California, U.S.
- Batted: Left Threw: Right

MLB debut
- July 1, 1957, for the Baltimore Orioles

Last MLB appearance
- May 9, 1961, for the Baltimore Orioles

MLB statistics
- Batting average: .167
- Stats at Baseball Reference

Teams
- Baltimore Orioles (1957–1958, 1961)

Frank Joseph Zupo (August 29, 1939 – March 25, 2005), nicknamed "Noodles", was an American professional baseball player. A catcher, he appeared in 16 games over parts of three seasons in Major League Baseball for the Baltimore Orioles in 1957–58 and 1961.

== Biography ==
Born in San Francisco, Zupo batted left-handed, threw right-handed, stood 5 feet 11 inches (1.80 m) tall and weighed 182 pounds (83 kg). He signed with the Orioles for a $50,000 bonus after graduating from Sacred Heart Cathedral Preparatory, a private Roman Catholic high school in his native city.

In 1957, Zupo entered the American League as a 17-year-old "bonus baby" without having played in the minor leagues; the bonus rule of the day mandated that MLB teams keep bonus players on their big-league rosters for two full years. That season, together with George Zuverink, Zupo twice formed the only "Z" battery in Major League history, the first time coming on July 1, 1957, when Zupo made his big-league debut with a 10th-inning catching appearance against the New York Yankees. He batted only 12 times in ten games in 1957, with one hit (.083).

In 1958, the bonus rule was amended and Baltimore was able to send Zupo to the minors for needed experience. Recalled after spending that year at three different minor league levels, he appeared in one September game and went hitless in two at bats in relief of the Orioles' regular catcher, Gus Triandos. His other trial in the big leagues occurred early in the 1961 campaign, and he collected two hits, including a double, in four at bats; it would be his only extra-base hit in the majors.

Zupo's career continued in the minor leagues through 1964 before he left the game.
