= Southwest High School (Fort Worth, Texas) =

Location
- 4100 Alta Mesa Blvd., Fort Worth, TX 76133; United States; 32.65207°N 97.38135°W

Information
- Type: Public
- Motto: To provide supportive, academic, and cultural opportunities that result in creative, disciplined, and productive life-long learners.
- Established: 1967
- School district: Fort Worth Independent School District
- Principal: John Engel
- Faculty: 90.80 (FTE)
- Grades: 9–12
- Enrollment: 1,186 (2023–2024)
- Student to teacher ratio: 13.06
- Colors: Cardinal red, royal blue, and white
- Mascot: The Raider
- Website: Southwest Homepage

Southwest High School is a public high school in Fort Worth, Texas, United States. It is one of fourteen traditional high schools in the Fort Worth Independent School District. The school has an enrollment of approximately 1,300 with a teaching staff of approximately 85. Southwest is classified as a 5A school in the state of Texas.

== History ==
Southwest High School was established in the fall of 1967 and first opened in January 1968 when the student body transferred from temporary facilities at Paschal High School.

When the school first opened, it was in a new neighborhood adjacent to ranch land, serving a 20-year-old neighborhood that bordered its back fence. The student population reached the 2,000 mark within a year, peaking at approximately 2,400. In 2025 Southwest is just one of the 29 Fort Worth ISD high schools in a city of more than one million residents.

The school mascot was originally a Confederate Rebel, and was later changed to the Raider because of complaints by community leaders, and to better represent the diverse student body. The school's colors are cardinal red, royal blue, and white.

== Notable alumni ==
- Brandon Finnegan (2011) — professional baseball pitcher for the Cincinnati Reds
- Marshall Harris (1974) — artist and former NFL football player
- Brandin Lea (1995) — former lead singer of Flickerstick
- Oliver Miller (1988) — former NBA basketball player
- Brian Milner (1978) — former MLB player
- Phoebe Strole (2001) — cast member of the Broadway musical Spring Awakening
