= Bobby Henrich =

American baseball player (1938–2026)

- Shortstop
- Born: December 24, 1938; Lawrence, Kansas, U.S.
- Died: February 9, 2026 (aged 87); La Habra, California, U.S.
- Batted: Right Threw: Right

MLB debut
- May 3, 1957, for the Cincinnati Redlegs

Last MLB appearance
- September 19, 1959, for the Cincinnati Reds

MLB statistics
- Batting average: .125
- Hits: 2
- RBI: 1
- Home runs: 0
- Stats at Baseball Reference

Teams
- Cincinnati Redlegs/Reds (1957–1959)

Robert Edward Henrich (December 24, 1938 – February 9, 2026) was an American Major League Baseball shortstop. He played parts of three seasons, from 1957 until 1959, for the Cincinnati Redlegs. He was used most frequently as a pinch runner.

== Amateur career ==
Born in Lawrence, Kansas and a distant relative of New York Yankees' Tommy Henrich, Bobby first attracted the attention of pro scouts following his junior year at Compton High School. He was the center fielder of the Compton Junior Legion team that won a tournament in Anaheim. Henrich was voted "best hustling player" by the scouts. In four years of Legion ball, he compiled a .482 batting average, as well a .484 average in high school. He ran the 100-yard dash in 9.7 seconds, and also played football and basketball in high school before concentrating on baseball his senior year. He was an excellent student, and made All-Southern California baseball team as a senior. Bobby was offered several college scholarships and was also wooed by many professional baseball teams. The Cincinnati Redlegs got a jump on the other clubs, though, by signing Bobby's father Ed, a junior college coach, as a scout. Soon after, Bobby signed with the Redlegs as a bonus baby for an estimated bonus of $30,000. Since that was after the 1956 season had ended, Bobby went to Compton Community College over the winter, then went to spring training with the Redlegs.

== Professional career ==
Henrich had played both shortstop and center field in high school; manager Birdie Tebbetts decided to try him out at shortstop, but said he would definitely make it as an outfielder if he did not succeed there. The former California sprint champion was selected as the Reds' fastest runner in a sportswriters' poll that spring. At only 18 years old, Henrich mainly sat on the bench once the regular season began; he got into 29 games that year, pinch-running in 16 of them, although he would sometimes stay in the game. He filled five positions that year.

During the winter, Henrich went to South America and played in the Panamanian League during three seasons, helping the Carta Vieja Yankees club win the 1954–1955 pennant.

With the repeal of the bonus rule, Henrich was allowed to be optioned to the minors in 1958, spending the season with the Savannah Sand Gnats in the South Atlantic League, while playing third base. The Redlegs recalled him in September and again used him mostly to pinch-run.

In 1959, Henrich returned to Savannah before earning a mid-season promotion to the Redlegs. After a brief stint there, he was sent to the Pacific Coast League, and again was recalled to Cincinnati in September.

On November 21, 1959, Bobby married Virginia Lee Brodbeck (October 21, 1940 – December 11, 2004) in Compton, California. The following year found him playing for Nashville in the Southern Association, and after the season, at the age of 22, Henrich left baseball.

== Life after baseball ==
After his playing days ended, Henrich went into the insurance business eventually owning an independent insurance agency in Brea, California. On May 4, 2008, Bob married Terese Jean Baber (born November 5, 1948) in Dana Point, California. His younger brother Jim (Scooter) Henrich was also a gifted baseball talent.

Bobby Henrich died in La Habra, California, on February 9, 2026, at the age of 87.

== See also ==
- List of baseball players who went directly to Major League Baseball
