= John Powers (baseball) =

American baseball player (1929–2001)

- Outfielder
- Born: July 8, 1929; Birmingham, Alabama, U.S.
- Died: September 25, 2001 (aged 72); Birmingham, Alabama, U.S.
- Batted: Left Threw: Right

MLB debut
- September 24, 1955, for the Pittsburgh Pirates

Last MLB appearance
- May 31, 1960, for the Cleveland Indians

MLB statistics
- Batting average: .195
- Home runs: 6
- Runs batted in: 14
- Stats at Baseball Reference

Teams
- Pittsburgh Pirates (1955–1958); Cincinnati Reds (1959); Baltimore Orioles (1960); Cleveland Indians (1960)

John Calvin Powers (July 8, 1929 – September 25, 2001) was an American professional baseball player, an outfielder who played for all or parts of six seasons in Major League Baseball for the Pittsburgh Pirates, Cincinnati Reds, Baltimore Orioles and Cleveland Indians.

The native of Birmingham, Alabama, batted left-handed, threw right-handed, stood 6 feet 1 inch (1.85 m) tall and weighed 185 pounds (84 kg). Although he hit only .195 in 151 MLB games played and 215 at bats, Powers was a feared batsman in minor league baseball, smashing 39 home runs in 1950 for the Class B Waco Pirates and in 1956 for the Double-A New Orleans Pelicans. He belted 298 home runs in his minor league career (1949–1951; 1954–1957; 1960–1965).

He died at age 72 in Birmingham.
