= Bonus rule =

Former Major League Baseball contractual rule

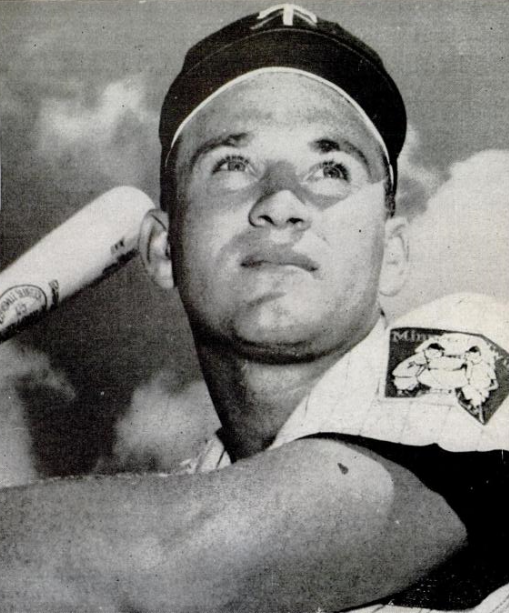
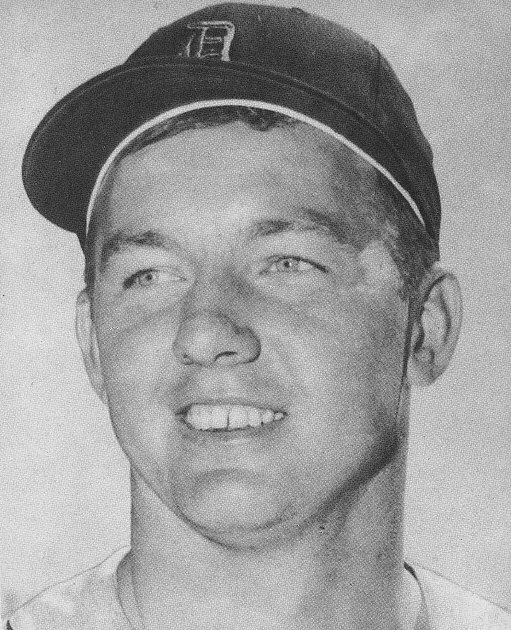
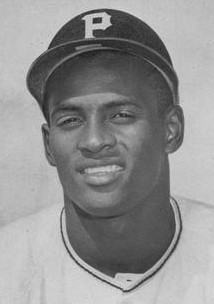
Sandy Koufax, Harmon Killebrew, Al Kaline, and Roberto Clemente were all bonus players who went on to be elected to the Baseball Hall of Fame.

The bonus rule was a contractual rule affecting major league baseball intermittently between 1947 and 1964, meant to prevent teams from assigning certain players to farm teams. The rule stipulated that when a major-league team signed a player to a contract with a signing bonus above a certain threshold, (Note: A bonus threshold of $4,000 is commonly noted, although sources indicate the threshold varied over time.) the team was required to keep that player on their active roster. Any team that failed to comply with the rule lost the rights to that player's contract, and the player was then exposed to the waiver wire.

The rule was first instituted in 1947, removed in December 1950, and re-introduced in December 1952. As in force for the 1953 though 1957 seasons, a player subject to the rule had to be on the team's active roster for two full seasons, after which he could be assigned to a farm team without repercussions. The rule was again rescinded in 1958, but re-established for the 1962 major-league expansion, with different and more relaxed stipulations. It was finally abolished in 1965, when the Major League Baseball draft was initiated.

== History of the rule ==
In the late 1930s and early 1940s, major league franchises found themselves bidding against one another for the services of young players. These engagements subsided when World War II broke out. When the war ended, the bidding wars resumed and resulted in skyrocketing signing bonuses. To counter this, in 1947, the major leagues implemented the bonus rule. The rule's purpose was to prevent the wealthiest teams from signing all of the best players and from stashing those players in their farm systems. Additionally, the bonus market was weakened as a result of inhibited competition. In return, this limited labor costs.

The legitimacy of the rule was challenged several times after it was initially implemented. In December 1950, the rule was rescinded. In December 1952, a committee chaired by Branch Rickey revived the rule. It was this iteration of the rule that stated a team had to place the players who met the bonus rule criteria on the major league roster immediately. Furthermore, the player had to remain on the roster for two years from the signing date.

Although players were signed as a result of their potential, many of them were not able to succeed. In an extreme case, pitcher Tom Qualters was on the active roster of the Philadelphia Phillies for all of 1953 and 1954, but pitched only one-third of an inning in one game of the 1953 season, and did not get into a game at all in 1954. Qualters did not appear in his second major league game until 1957, and never recorded a victory as a big league pitcher.

Incidents like the Clete Boyer trade (detail below) showed how the bonus rule could be circumvented. Rumor also spread that teams were ignoring the rule and bribing players. In 1958, both leagues voted to rescind the rule. In addition, they rescinded it retroactively. This eliminated the major league roster requirement for the players signed in 1957.

After the league added four new teams (the Angels and Senators, followed by the Colt .45s and Mets), the bonus rule was reintroduced for the 1962 season. The main difference between the new version of the rule and the previous one was that a player had to spend just one full season on the roster instead of two seasons. As approved in December 1961: "all [rookies] in the minors are draftable at $8,000. If brought to the major league roster, only one can be optioned to the minors. Others must pass through an irrevocable $8,000 waiver claim." Entering the 1963 season, National League teams had a total of 14 players subject to the bonus rule (led by the New York Mets with three), while American League teams had a total of 17 such players (led by the Chicago White Sox and Kansas City Athletics with three each).

The bonus rule was rescinded permanently in June 1965, with the introduction of the Major League Baseball draft.

=== Avoidances ===
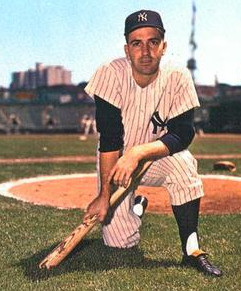
Clete Boyer, during his time with the Yankees

Instances of teams skirting the bonus rule include Paul Pettit, signed by the Pittsburgh Pirates at the end of January 1950. While his bonus was a record-setting $100,000 ($1.34 million in 2025), the contract was actually with the minor-league New Orleans Pelicans, where Pettit spent the 1950 season before making his major-league debut in May 1951.

The New York Yankees worked out a deal with the Kansas City Athletics whereby the Athletics signed Clete Boyer to a contract at the end of May 1955. At this time, the Yankees were perennially finishing at or near the top of the American League, with the Athletics at or near the bottom of the standings. The Athletics used Boyer sparingly for the two years they had him. Then, in early June 1957, just days after the first date at which the Athletics could send Boyer down to the minor leagues, they sent him to the Yankees as the player to be named later from a trade the previous winter. This trade did not sit well with the owners of the other American League teams. They claimed that the Yankees had used the Athletics to hold Boyer. However, the deal was allowed by the league.

Notable players who received large signing bonuses during the two years that the rule was not in effect—December 1950 to December 1952—included Jay Porter, a $67,500 bonus in 1951 ($837,260 in 2025), and Dick Groat, a bonus of approximately $35,000 in June 1952 ($424,342 in 2025).

== Bonus players ==
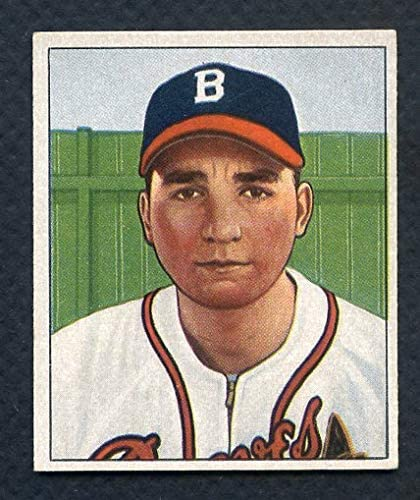
Johnny Antonelli, one of the first bonus babies

Players signed under the bonus rule were referred to as "bonus players" or "bonus babies". These players often went straight to the major leagues and, due to bonus rule, were prevented from spending time and developing their talent in the minor leagues. As a result, the rule came under criticism because it often caused such a player to languish on a major league bench instead of gaining experience in the minors.

During the most restrictive period, 1953 to 1957, at least 58 bonus players are known to have been signed by major-league teams. (Note: A count of 57 is given in a 2004 article by Steve Treder in The Hardball Times. However, Treder omitted Roberto Clemente from his list of players, possibly due to Clemente not playing for the team that first signed him and issued his bonus, the Dodgers. A count of 58, including Clemente, aligns with the Baseball Almanac list of players, for the 1953–1957 period.) Four of those players went on to have Hall of Fame careers: Roberto Clemente, Al Kaline, Harmon Killebrew, and Sandy Koufax.

Of the four, only Killebrew, a bonus baby for the Washington Senators, saw any minor league service time once his mandatory two-year period expired. Clemente was signed as a bonus player by the Brooklyn Dodgers who sent him to the minors to allow him to develop; however, he was subsequently drafted under the Rule 5 draft by the Pittsburgh Pirates after one of their scouts took note his raw skills. Kaline and Koufax, on the other hand, never played in the minor leagues.

Other notable stars who signed under the original bonus rule were Clete Boyer, Lindy McDaniel, and Johnny Antonelli.

Under the 1962 rule, which had more relaxed requirements, notable bonus players included Hall of Fame pitcher Catfish Hunter and Hall of Fame manager Tony La Russa. Hunter did not see any minor league service but did pitch in the Florida Instructional League before his major league debut.

=== List of bonus players ===
A list of players who are known to have been subjected to the bonus rule follows. The list should be considered incomplete, as there is currently no known comprehensive list of all such players, as kept contemporaneously by the American League and National League or compiled later, especially for players outside of the 1953–1957 window.

Key
*	Inducted into the Baseball Hall of Fame

Name	Position	Amateur team	Major-league team	Bonus	Debut
Joey Amalfitano	Second baseman	Loyola Marymount	New York Giants	$40,000	May 2, 1954
Johnny Antonelli	Pitcher	Thomas Jefferson HS (NY)	Boston Braves	$65,000	July 4, 1948
Bob Bailey	Third baseman	Woodrow Wilson HS (CA)	Pittsburgh Pirates	$175,000	September 14, 1962
Reno Bertoia	Third baseman	Assumption College HS (ON)	Detroit Tigers	$23,000	September 22, 1953
Steve Boros	Infielder	Michigan	Detroit Tigers	$25,000	June 19, 1957
Clete Boyer	Third baseman	Alba HS (MO)	Kansas City Athletics	$35,000	June 5, 1955
Jim Brady	Pitcher	Notre Dame	Detroit Tigers	$37,000	May 12, 1956
Mack Burk	Catcher	Texas	Philadelphia Phillies	$40,000	May 25, 1956
Tom Carroll	Infielder	Notre Dame	New York Yankees	$30,000	May 7, 1955
Wayne Causey	Infielder	Neville HS (LA)	Baltimore Orioles	$32,000	June 5, 1955
Roberto Clemente^{*}	Outfielder	La Escuela Julio C Vizcarrondo	Brooklyn Dodgers	$10,000	April 17, 1955
Billy Consolo	Shortstop	Dorsey HS (CA)	Boston Red Sox	$65,000	April 20, 1953
Willie Crawford	Catcher	Fremont HS (CA)	Los Angeles Dodgers	$100,000	September 16, 1964
John DeMerit	Outfielder	Wisconsin	Milwaukee Braves	$100,000	June 18, 1957
Jim Derrington	Pitcher	South Gate HS (CA)	Chicago White Sox	$78,000	September 30, 1956
Moe Drabowsky	Pitcher	Trinity College (CT)	Chicago Cubs	$75,000	August 7, 1956
John Edelman	Pitcher	West Chester	Milwaukee Braves	$20,000	June 2, 1955
Tom Gastall	Catcher	Boston University	Baltimore Orioles	$30,000	June 21, 1955
Bob Garibaldi	Pitcher	Santa Clara	San Francisco Giants	$150,000	July 15, 1962
Paul Giel	Pitcher	Minnesota	New York Giants	$60,000	July 10, 1954
Bobby Henrich	Shortstop	Compton HS (CA)	Cincinnati Redlegs	$25,000	May 3, 1957
Dave Hill	Pitcher	Northwestern	Kansas City Athletics	$30,000	August 22, 1957
Jay Hook	Pitcher	Northwestern	Cincinnati Redlegs	$65,000	September 3, 1957
Catfish Hunter^{*}	Pitcher	Perquimans County HS (NC)	Oakland Athletics	$75,000	May 13, 1965
Ron Jackson	First baseman	Western Michigan	Chicago White Sox	$10,000	June 15, 1954
Vic Janowicz	Catcher	Ohio State	Pittsburgh Pirates	$25,000	May 31, 1953
Joey Jay	Pitcher	Woodrow Wilson HS (CT)	Milwaukee Braves	$40,000	July 21, 1953
Don Kaiser	Pitcher	East Central University	Chicago Cubs	$27,000	July 20, 1955
Al Kaline^{*}	Outfielder	Southern HS (MD)	Detroit Tigers	$35,000	June 25, 1953
Harmon Killebrew^{*}	First baseman	Payette HS (ID)	Washington Senators	$30,000	June 23, 1954
Jerry Kindall	Second baseman	Minnesota	Chicago Cubs	$50,000	July 1, 1956
Nick Koback	Catcher	Hartford Public HS (CT)	Pittsburgh Pirates	$20,000	July 29, 1953
Sandy Koufax^{*}	Pitcher	Cincinnati	Brooklyn Dodgers	$14,000	June 24, 1955
Kenny Kuhn	Infielder	Louisville Male HS (KY)	Cleveland Indians	$50,000	July 7, 1955
Frank Leja	First baseman	Holyoke HS (MA)	New York Yankees	$40,000	May 1, 1954
Ralph Lumenti	Pitcher	Boston University	Washington Senators	$35,000	September 7, 1957
Mike McCormick	Pitcher	Mark Keppel HS (CA)	New York Giants	$50,000	September 3, 1956
Lindy McDaniel	Pitcher	Arnett HS (OK)	St. Louis Cardinals	$50,000	September 2, 1955
Von McDaniel	Pitcher	Arnett HS (OK)	St. Louis Cardinals	$50,000	June 13, 1957
Bob G. Miller	Pitcher	Morton East HS (IL)	Cincinnati Redlegs	$60,000	June 25, 1953
Bob L. Miller	Pitcher	Beaumont HS (MO)	St. Louis Cardinals	$25,000	June 26, 1957
Paul Martin	Pitcher	Marion Center Area HS (PA)	Pittsburgh Pirates	$20,000	July 2, 1955
Tex Nelson	First baseman	W. H. Adamson HS (TX)	Baltimore Orioles	$40,000	June 22, 1955
Eddie O'Brien	Shortstop	Seattle	Pittsburgh Pirates	$40,000	April 25, 1953
Johnny O'Brien	Second baseman	Seattle	Pittsburgh Pirates	$40,000	April 19, 1953
Billy O'Dell	Pitcher	Clemson	Baltimore Orioles	$24,000	June 20, 1954
Jim Pagliaroni	Catcher	Wilson HS (CA)	Boston Red Sox	$85,000	August 13, 1955
Don Pavletich	Catcher	Nathan Hale HS (WI)	Cincinnati Reds	$30,000	April 20, 1957
Laurin Pepper	Pitcher	Southern Miss	Pittsburgh Pirates	$20,000	July 4, 1954
Bob Powell	Pinch runner	Michigan State	Chicago White Sox	$36,000	September 16, 1955
Buddy Pritchard	Second baseman	USC	Pittsburgh Pirates	$48,000	April 21, 1957
Jim Pyburn	Third baseman	Alabama Polytechnic Institute	Baltimore Orioles	$50,000	April 17, 1955
Tom Qualters	Pitcher	McKeesport HS (PA)	Philadelphia Phillies	$40,000	September 13, 1953
Mel Roach	Infielder	Virginia	Milwaukee Braves	$45,000	July 31, 1953
Johnny Romano	Catcher	Demherst HS (NJ)	Pittsburgh Pirates	$15,000	September 12, 1958
Ducky Schofield	Shortstop	Springfield HS (IL)	St. Louis Cardinals	$40,000	July 3, 1953
Jerry Schoonmaker	Outfielder	Missouri	Washington Senators	$30,000	June 11, 1955
John Sevcik	Catcher	Missouri	Minnesota Twins	$10,000	April 24, 1965
Al Silvera	Outfielder	USC	Cincinnati Reds	$20,000	June 12, 1955
Jim Small	Outfielder	Bellarmine College Prep (CA)	Detroit Tigers	$30,000	June 22, 1955
Red Swanson	Pitcher	LSU	Pittsburgh Pirates	$20,000	September 10, 1955
Hawk Taylor	Catcher	Metropolis Community HS (IL)	Milwaukee Braves	$119,000	June 9, 1957
George Thomas	Outfielder	Minnesota	Detroit Tigers	$25,000	September 11, 1957
Fred Van Dusen	Pinch hitter	Bryant HS (NY)	Philadelphia Phillies	$50,000	September 11, 1955
Jerry Walker	Pitcher	Byng HS (OK)	Baltimore Orioles	$20,000	July 6, 1957
Frank Zupo	Catcher	Sacred Heart Cathedral Prep (CA)	Baltimore Orioles	$50,000	July 1, 1957

Source: (Note: This list is based on the cited source at Baseball Almanac. Other sources note additional players from outside of the 1953–1957 period.)

== See also ==
- List of baseball players who went directly to Major League Baseball
