= Laurin Pepper =

American baseball and football player (1930–2018)

Profile
- Position: Running back
- Class: 1952–53

Personal information
- Born: January 18, 1930; Vaughan, Mississippi, U.S.
- Died: February 4, 2018 (aged 88); Ocean Springs, Mississippi, U.S.
- Listed height: 5 ft 11 in (1.80 m)
- Listed weight: 190 lb (86 kg)

Awards and highlights
- 1,868 rushing yards; 20 rushing TDs; 157 total points; 8.3 yards per carry – 1953 (single-season school record); 8.2 career yards per carry (school career record); 8 Games with 100 or more rushing yards; 1953 All-American

Hugh Pepper
- Pitcher
- Batted: Right Threw: Right

MLB debut
- July 4, 1954, for the Pittsburgh Pirates

Last MLB appearance
- June 6, 1957, for the Pittsburgh Pirates

MLB statistics
- Win–loss record: 2–8
- Earned run average: 7.06
- Strikeouts: 40
- Stats at Baseball Reference

Teams
- Pittsburgh Pirates (1954–1957)

Hugh McLaurin Pepper III (January 18, 1930 – February 4, 2018) was an American Major League Baseball player, All-American football player, and high school football coach. Born in Vaughan, Mississippi, he is a member of the University of Southern Mississippi Hall of Fame and was a charter member of the school's Legends Club, as well as the Mississippi Sports Hall of Fame. He was twice honored by the Mississippi State Legislature—once for his playing career at USM and once for his achievements as a high school football coach in Ocean Springs.

== College career ==
Before turning to professional baseball, Pepper was an All-American halfback at Mississippi Southern. He starred in a 1953 Mississippi Southern win over 5th-ranked University of Alabama led by Bart Starr. Pepper had a 66-yard touchdown run combined with a 45-yard touchdown reception in the upset. He complimented his offensive performance with an interception on defense to help lift then Mississippi Southern to its first win against Alabama. Pepper was an explosive threat on the football field with an 8.2 career yards per carry average, still the school record. He also has two touchdowns on kick returns in only 6 attempts.

== Professional career ==
Pepper was selected in the sixth round of the 1954 NFL Draft by the Pittsburgh Steelers. He instead signed a bonus contract with the Pittsburgh Pirates. Under the rules in place at that time, the Pirates were required to keep Pepper on their Major League Baseball roster.

From 1954 to 1957, Pepper pitched in 44 games for the Pirates. His first win was in a game played on August 26, 1954. He only won one other major league game. Pepper played in his last major league game on June 6, 1957. Three days later he was optioned to the Hollywood Stars of the Pacific Coast League in order to make room for Dick Hall. Pepper continued to play professional baseball in the minor leagues until 1963.

== Coaching career ==
After his playing days were over, Pepper spent nearly three decades as a high school football coach and athletic director at Ocean Springs High School, where he had 25 winning seasons, won 12 Gulf Coast Conference championships and had 6 undefeated teams. At a ceremony in 1998, the high school honored Pepper by naming the Greyhound Stadium field 'Hugh Pepper Field'. As Head Coach, Pepper led the Greyhounds to a 191-81-3 record over 28 seasons. In 1991, the year he retired, Pepper was honored by the National Football Foundation as its "Distinguished American."

== Personal life ==
Pepper and his wife, Janice, had four children and were married for 63 years.

Pepper died at his home in Ocean Springs, Mississippi on February 4, 2018, at the age of 88.
