= Paul Martin (baseball) =

American baseball player (1932–2011)

- Pitcher
- Born: March 9, 1932; Brownstown, Pennsylvania
- Died: October 11, 2011 (aged 79); San Diego, California
- Batted: Right Threw: Right

MLB debut
- July 2, 1955, for the Pittsburgh Pirates

Last MLB appearance
- August 16, 1955, for the Pittsburgh Pirates

MLB statistics
- Win–loss record: 0–1
- Earned run average: 14.14
- Innings pitched: 7
- Stats at Baseball Reference

Teams
- Pittsburgh Pirates (1955)

Paul Charles Martin (March 9, 1932 – October 11, 2011) was an American professional baseball player. Martin was a 6 ft 6 in (1.98 m), 230 lb (100 kg) right-handed pitcher who appeared in seven Major League games for the 1955 Pittsburgh Pirates. He was born at Brownstown, Pennsylvania.

Martin was a 1950s bonus baby who joined the Pirates' MLB roster immediately after signing his first pro contract in 1955. In his debut, he hurled two scoreless innings in relief against that season's eventual world champions, the Brooklyn Dodgers. In his second appearance, on July 5, he started against the defending world champions, the New York Giants. But Martin walked Alvin Dark, Willie Mays and Dusty Rhodes and hit Don Mueller with a pitch in the first inning, failed to record an out, and was tagged with the loss, his only Major League decision.

Martin sustained a career-ending arm injury that season. After an August 16 outing as a reliever, he never pitched in another professional game.

In seven Major League innings, Martin gave up 11 earned runs and 13 hits. Plagued by wildness, he issued 17 bases on balls, with one wild pitch and one hit batsman, while striking out three.

Martin died in 2011 in San Diego, California, at the age of 79. He was interred at Greenwood Memorial Park.
