= Red Swanson (baseball) =

American baseball player (1936–2024)

- Pitcher
- Born: October 15, 1936; Baton Rouge, Louisiana, U.S.
- Died: January 19, 2024 (aged 87)
- Batted: Right Threw: Right

MLB debut
- September 10, 1955, for the Pittsburgh Pirates

Last MLB appearance
- September 21, 1957, for the Pittsburgh Pirates

MLB statistics
- Win–loss record: 3–3
- Earned run average: 4.90
- Strikeouts: 34
- Stats at Baseball Reference

Teams
- Pittsburgh Pirates (1955–1957)

Arthur Leonard "Red" Swanson Jr. (October 15, 1936 – January 19, 2024) was an American Major League Baseball pitcher who appeared in 43 games (42 on the mound) for the Pittsburgh Pirates from 1955 through 1957. Born in Baton Rouge, Louisiana, Swanson graduated from Neville High School in Monroe and later went to Louisiana State University. His father, A. L. Swanson, coached both baseball and basketball at Louisiana State.

Red Swanson threw and batted right-handed and was listed as 6 feet 1 inch (1.85 m) tall and 175 pounds (79 kg). The Pirates signed him as a "bonus baby" on August 27, 1955, and the bonus rule of the time compelled him to spend his first two full seasons in professional baseball on Pittsburgh's MLB roster. He appeared in one game in 1955, ten games in 1956 (one as a pinch runner), and 32 contests in 1957.

In his 42 pitching appearances, Swanson posted a 3–3 won–lost record and a 4.90 earned run average. He made eight starts and threw one complete game (a four-hit, 8–1 triumph over the St. Louis Cardinals at Busch Stadium on June 18, 1957). In 861/3 career innings pitched, he allowed 91 hits and 42 bases on balls, with 34 strikeouts.

At the conclusion of his bonus-rule service, Swanson was assigned to the minor leagues in 1958. He continued to pitch into 1963, but he never got back to the majors. He spent his entire pro career in the Pirates' organization.

Swanson died at home on January 19, 2024, at the age of 87.
