= 1951 Philadelphia Phillies season =

1951 Philadelphia Phillies
- League: National League
- Ballpark: Shibe Park
- City: Philadelphia
- Owners: R. R. M. Carpenter, Jr.
- General managers: R. R. M. Carpenter, Jr.
- Managers: Eddie Sawyer
- Television: WPTZ; WCAU; WFIL
- Radio: WPEN (Gene Kelly, Bill Brundige)

The 1951 Philadelphia Phillies season was the 69th season in the history of the franchise.

The Phillies finished in fifth place. The team had won the 1950 National League pennant but in the United Press' annual preseason poll of sportswriters, only 18 out of 168 writers picked the team to repeat as pennant winners; the Giants received 81 votes and the Dodgers 55. Those two teams wound up tied, with the Phillies 23 games behind.

== Offseason ==
- Prior to 1951 season: Ray Semproch was signed as an amateur free agent by the Phillies.

== Preseason ==
The Phillies held spring training in Clearwater, Florida, stayed at the Fort Harrison Hotel, and played at Clearwater Athletic Field. It was the team's fifth successive year training in Clearwater.

== Regular season ==
=== Season standings ===
National League
Team	W	L	Pct.	GB	Home	Road
New York Giants	98	59	.624	—	50‍–‍28	48‍–‍31
Brooklyn Dodgers	97	60	.618	1	49‍–‍29	48‍–‍31
St. Louis Cardinals	81	73	.526	15½	44‍–‍34	37‍–‍39
Boston Braves	76	78	.494	20½	42‍–‍35	34‍–‍43
Philadelphia Phillies	73	81	.474	23½	38‍–‍39	35‍–‍42
Cincinnati Reds	68	86	.442	28½	35‍–‍42	33‍–‍44
Pittsburgh Pirates	64	90	.416	32½	32‍–‍45	32‍–‍45
Chicago Cubs	62	92	.403	34½	32‍–‍45	30‍–‍47

=== Record vs. opponents ===
1951 National League record Sources:
Team	BSN	BRO	CHC	CIN	NYG	PHI	PIT	STL
Boston	—	10–12–1	10–12	10–12	8–14	12–10	13–9	13–9
Brooklyn	12–10–1	—	14–8	14–8	14–11	15–7	10–12	18–4
Chicago	12–10	8–14	—	10–12	7–15	7–15	9–13	9–13–1
Cincinnati	12–10	8–14	12–10	—	5–17	11–11	12–10–1	8–14
New York	14–8	11–14	15–7	17–5	—	16–6	14–8	11–11
Philadelphia	10–12	7–15	15–7	11–11	6–16	—	15–7	9–13
Pittsburgh	9–13	12–10	13–9	10–12–1	8–14	7–15	—	5–17
St. Louis	9–13	4–18	13–9–1	14–8	11–11	13–9	17–5	—

=== Notable transactions ===
- June 11, 1951: Ted Kazanski was signed as an amateur free agent by the Phillies.

=== All-Star Game ===
The 1951 All-Star Game was originally awarded to the Philadelphia Phillies. The City of Detroit was celebrating the 250th anniversary of its founding in 1701 and requested to host the year's All-Star Game. Although the National League was scheduled to host the game in '51, the game was moved to Detroit's Briggs Stadium to coincide with the city's celebration. The Phillies instead hosted the 1952 All-Star Game at Shibe Park.

=== Game log ===
Legend
	Phillies win
	Phillies loss
	Postponement
**Bold**	Phillies team member

1951 Game Log
Overall Record: 73–81
April (7–6)

#	Date	Opponent	Score	Win	Loss	Save	Attendance	Record
1	April 17	@ Dodgers	5–2	**Robin Roberts** (1–0)	Carl Erskine (0–1)	None	19,217	1–0
2	April 18	@ Dodgers	3–4	Preacher Roe (1–0)	**Jim Konstanty** (0–1)	None	15,415	1–1
–	April 19	@ Dodgers	Postponed (rain); Makeup: May 31					
3	April 20	Braves	1–2	Max Surkont (1–0)	**Ken Heintzelman** (0–1)	None	17,423	1–2
4	April 21	Braves	6–8	Vern Bickford (1–1)	**Robin Roberts** (1–1)	George Estock (1)	10,945	1–3
5	April 22	Braves	6–5	**Bubba Church** (1–0)	Johnny Sain (0–1)	None	11,261	2–3
6	April 23	Giants	8–4	**Jocko Thompson** (1–0)	Jim Hearn (1–1)	None	17,283	3–3
7	April 24	Giants	6–4	**Bob Miller** (1–0)	Roger Bowman (0–1)	**Jim Konstanty** (1)	16,274	4–3
8	April 25	Giants	2–1	**Ken Heintzelman** (1–1)	Larry Jansen (1–2)	None	5,257	5–3
9	April 26	Dodgers	2–0	**Robin Roberts** (2–1)	Chris Van Cuyk (0–1)	None	30,161	6–3
10	April 27	Dodgers	5–11	Joe Hatten (1–0)	**Bubba Church** (1–1)	Carl Erskine (1)	9,267	6–4
11	April 28	@ Braves	0–3	Max Surkont (3–0)	**Russ Meyer** (0–1)	None	7,848	6–5
12	April 29 (1)	@ Braves	0–1	Vern Bickford (3–1)	**Jocko Thompson** (1–1)	None	see 2nd game	6–6
13	April 29 (2)	@ Braves	10–9	**Leo Cristante** (1–0)	Blix Donnelly (0–1)	**Jim Konstanty** (2)	18,518	7–6

May (10–18)

#	Date	Opponent	Score	Win	Loss	Save	Attendance	Record
14	May 1	Reds	6–5	**Robin Roberts** (3–1)	Willie Ramsdell (0–3)	None	13,749	8–6
15	May 2	Reds	4–6	Ewell Blackwell (3–2)	**Ken Heintzelman** (1–2)	Frank Smith (2)	3,417	8–7
16	May 3	Cardinals	4–8	Joe Presko (1–0)	**Jim Konstanty** (0–2)	None	14,289	8–8
17	May 4	Cardinals	6–4	**Russ Meyer** (1–1)	Howie Pollet (0–1)	None	14,232	9–8
18	May 5	Cardinals	3–4 (11)	Gerry Staley (3–1)	**Jim Konstanty** (0–3)	None	13,895	9–9
19	May 6 (1)	Cubs	5–4	**Bubba Church** (2–1)	Frank Hiller (2–2)	None	see 2nd game	10–9
20	May 6 (2)	Cubs	7–9 (10)	Johnny Klippstein (1–0)	**Robin Roberts** (3–2)	None	20,998	10–10
21	May 8	Pirates	3–9	Mel Queen (2–1)	**Ken Heintzelman** (1–3)	Bill Werle (5)	13,700	10–11
22	May 9	Pirates	6–5 (10)	**Jim Konstanty** (1–3)	Joe Muir (0–2)	None	14,134	11–11
23	May 10	Pirates	0–2	Murry Dickson (4–1)	**Bubba Church** (2–2)	None	3,562	11–12
–	May 11	@ Giants	Postponed (rain); Makeup: May 13 as a traditional double-header					
24	May 12	@ Giants	6–5 (10)	**Jim Konstanty** (2–3)	Dave Koslo (1–2)	None	12,856	12–12
25	May 13 (1)	@ Giants	2–11	Larry Jansen (3–3)	**Jocko Thompson** (1–2)	None	see 2nd game	12–13
26	May 13 (2)	@ Giants	2–4	Sal Maglie (4–2)	**Ken Heintzelman** (1–4)	None	26,740	12–14
27	May 15	@ Cardinals	5–4	**Russ Meyer** (2–1)	Tom Poholsky (2–3)	**Robin Roberts** (1)	13,837	13–14
28	May 16	@ Cardinals	3–5	Gerry Staley (5–3)	**Bubba Church** (2–3)	Al Brazle (1)	9,117	13–15
29	May 17	@ Cardinals	1–2	Joe Presko (2–2)	**Robin Roberts** (3–3)	None	9,754	13–16
30	May 18	@ Cubs	9–18	Dutch Leonard (1–0)	**Leo Cristante** (1–1)	None	7,564	13–17
31	May 19	@ Cubs	2–1	**Bubba Church** (3–3)	Johnny Klippstein (2–1)	**Jim Konstanty** (3)	20,811	14–17
32	May 20 (1)	@ Pirates	17–0	**Russ Meyer** (3–1)	Murry Dickson (5–3)	None	see 2nd game	15–17
33	May 20 (2)	@ Pirates	12–4	**Robin Roberts** (4–3)	Erv Dusak (0–1)	None	36,166	16–17
–	May 22	@ Reds	Postponed (rain); Makeup: July 30					
34	May 23	@ Reds	3–4 (10)	Willie Ramsdell (3–4)	**Jim Konstanty** (2–4)	None	2,647	16–18
35	May 25	Giants	5–8	George Spencer (2–1)	**Bob Miller** (1–1)	Sheldon Jones (3)	21,082	16–19
36	May 26	Giants	0–2	Larry Jansen (4–4)	**Robin Roberts** (4–4)	None	26,491	16–20
37	May 27	Giants	0–2	Sal Maglie (7–2)	**Russ Meyer** (3–2)	None	9,090	16–21
38	May 28	Dodgers	3–4	Ralph Branca (2–1)	**Ken Heintzelman** (1–5)	None	20,387	16–22
39	May 30 (1)	Dodgers	3–5	Don Newcombe (5–2)	**Robin Roberts** (4–5)	None	see 2nd game	16–23
40	May 30 (2)	Dodgers	9–5	**Bubba Church** (4–3)	Clyde King (4–3)	None	34,697	17–23
41	May 31	@ Dodgers	3–4	Carl Erskine (4–4)	**Russ Meyer** (3–3)	None	18,662	17–24

June (16–10)

#	Date	Opponent	Score	Win	Loss	Save	Attendance	Record
42	June 1	Cardinals	7–3	**Jocko Thompson** (2–2)	Gerry Staley (7–4)	**Jim Konstanty** (4)	16,372	18–24
43	June 2	Cardinals	5–2	**Ken Heintzelman** (2–5)	Tom Poholsky (4–4)	None	4,874	19–24
44	June 3 (1)	Pirates	11–2	**Robin Roberts** (5–5)	Mel Queen (3–5)	None	see 2nd game	20–24
45	June 3 (2)	Pirates	8–3	**Bubba Church** (5–3)	Murry Dickson (6–5)	None	19,325	21–24
46	June 4	Pirates	4–12	Bob Friend (1–1)	**Russ Meyer** (3–4)	Murry Dickson (1)	2,343	21–25
47	June 5	Cubs	2–3	Bob Rush (3–2)	**Jim Konstanty** (2–5)	None	10,937	21–26
48	June 6	Cubs	9–1	**Robin Roberts** (6–5)	Bob Schultz (3–4)	None	10,048	22–26
49	June 7	Cubs	7–1	**Bubba Church** (6–3)	Johnny Klippstein (3–2)	None	3,257	23–26
–	June 8	Reds	Postponed (rain); Makeup: July 17 as a traditional double-header					
50	June 9	Reds	4–5	Ewell Blackwell (7–4)	**Jocko Thompson** (2–3)	None	4,093	23–27
–	June 10 (1)	Reds	Postponed (rain); Makeup: July 18 as a traditional double-header					
–	June 10 (2)	Reds	Postponed (rain); Makeup: August 27 as a traditional double-header					
51	June 12	@ Cubs	6–5	**Milo Candini** (1–0)	Frank Hiller (4–5)	**Jim Konstanty** (5)	9,289	24–27
52	June 13	@ Cubs	5–0	**Robin Roberts** (7–5)	Johnny Klippstein (3–3)	None	7,889	25–27
53	June 14	@ Cubs	11–3	**Russ Meyer** (4–4)	Bob Rush (4–3)	None	6,896	26–27
54	June 15	@ Cardinals	2–10	Max Lanier (3–5)	**Ken Heintzelman** (2–6)	Cloyd Boyer (1)	9,320	26–28
55	June 16	@ Cardinals	5–6	Al Brazle (1–0)	**Jocko Thompson** (2–4)	Tom Poholsky (1)	12,932	26–29
56	June 17	@ Cardinals	4–5 (10)	Gerry Staley (8–6)	**Russ Meyer** (4–5)	None	22,751	26–30
57	June 19	@ Pirates	9–2	**Russ Meyer** (5–5)	Murry Dickson (8–7)	None	16,601	27–30
58	June 20	@ Pirates	1–0	**Bubba Church** (7–3)	Bob Friend (1–4)	None	12,751	28–30
59	June 21	@ Pirates	10–5	**Robin Roberts** (8–5)	Paul LaPalme (1–4)	None	5,682	29–30
60	June 22	@ Reds	2–3	Harry Perkowski (2–1)	**Jocko Thompson** (2–5)	Frank Smith (6)	8,973	29–31
61	June 23	@ Reds	1–8	Willie Ramsdell (5–7)	**Ken Heintzelman** (2–7)	Frank Smith (7)	4,343	29–32
62	June 24 (1)	@ Reds	1–3	Ken Raffensberger (7–7)	**Robin Roberts** (8–6)	None	see 2nd game	29–33
63	June 24 (2)	@ Reds	4–2	**Ken Heintzelman** (3–7)	Frank Smith (4–2)	**Jocko Thompson** (1)	19,005	30–33
64	June 26	Braves	7–0	**Bubba Church** (8–3)	Johnny Sain (4–8)	None	18,802	31–33
–	June 27	Braves	Postponed (rain); Makeup: August 7 as a traditional double-header					
65	June 28	Braves	3–2 (10)	**Jim Konstanty** (3–5)	Warren Spahn (8–6)	None	5,119	32–33
66	June 29	@ Dodgers	3–2	**Robin Roberts** (9–6)	Erv Palica (1–3)	None	24,566	33–33
67	June 30	@ Dodgers	8–14	Carl Erskine (7–7)	**Bubba Church** (8–4)	None	8,096	33–34

July (17–15)

#	Date	Opponent	Score	Win	Loss	Save	Attendance	Record
68	July 1	@ Dodgers	0–2	Don Newcombe (11–4)	**Russ Meyer** (5–6)	None	18,074	33–35
69	July 2	@ Giants	3–4	Jim Hearn (7–5)	**Ken Heintzelman** (3–8)	George Spencer (2)	23,046	33–36
70	July 3	@ Giants	8–9 (13)	Larry Jansen (11–6)	**Jocko Thompson** (2–6)	None	9,295	33–37
71	July 4 (1)	@ Braves	4–1	**Robin Roberts** (10–6)	Chet Nichols (3–3)	None	see 2nd game	34–37
72	July 4 (2)	@ Braves	3–1	**Bubba Church** (9–4)	Dave Cole (0–2)	None	13,010	35–37
73	July 5	@ Braves	6–7 (11)	Chet Nichols (4–3)	**Jim Konstanty** (3–6)	None	2,902	35–38
74	July 6	Dodgers	2–6	Carl Erskine (8–8)	**Russ Meyer** (5–7)	None	31,178	35–39
75	July 7	Dodgers	2–6	Ralph Branca (7–2)	**Robin Roberts** (10–7)	None	30,695	35–40
76	July 8	Dodgers	4–6 (10)	Erv Palica (2–3)	**Jim Konstanty** (3–7)	Clyde King (3)	26,071	35–41
–	July 10	**1951 Major League Baseball All-Star Game at Briggs Stadium in Detroit**						
77	July 12	Pirates	11–6	**Russ Meyer** (6–7)	Murry Dickson (10–10)	None	10,618	36–41
78	July 13	Pirates	3–2	**Robin Roberts** (11–7)	Howie Pollet (2–6)	None	7,786	37–41
79	July 14	Pirates	2–0	**Bubba Church** (10–4)	Vern Law (3–3)	None	4,106	38–41
80	July 15 (1)	Cardinals	4–7	Jack Crimian (1–0)	**Ken Johnson** (0–1)	Al Brazle (2)	see 2nd game	38–42
81	July 15 (2)	Cardinals	6–4	**Ken Heintzelman** (4–8)	Tom Poholsky (4–7)	**Jim Konstanty** (6)	25,551	39–42
82	July 16	Cardinals	5–2	**Russ Meyer** (7–7)	Gerry Staley (12–9)	**Jim Konstanty** (7)	11,502	40–42
83	July 17 (1)	Reds	8–9	Howie Fox (6–4)	**Robin Roberts** (11–8)	Frank Smith (10)	see 2nd game	40–43
84	July 17 (2)	Reds	10–0	**Jocko Thompson** (3–6)	Ken Raffensberger (9–10)	None	18,081	41–43
85	July 18 (1)	Reds	0–2	Willie Ramsdell (8–9)	**Bubba Church** (10–5)	None	see 2nd game	41–44
86	July 18 (2)	Reds	1–0	**Ken Johnson** (1–1)	Herm Wehmeier (1–4)	None	15,810	42–44
87	July 20	Cubs	4–3 (11)	**Jim Konstanty** (4–7)	Bob Rush (5–5)	None	10,642	43–44
88	July 21	Cubs	5–0	**Robin Roberts** (12–8)	Turk Lown (2–5)	None	5,515	44–44
89	July 22 (1)	Cubs	7–8 (14)	Dutch Leonard (8–3)	**Jim Konstanty** (4–8)	None	see 2nd game	44–45
90	July 22 (2)	Cubs	3–2 (12)^{^{[a]}}	**Bubba Church** (11–5)	Monk Dubiel (0–1)	None	13,877	45–45
91	July 24	@ Cardinals	5–9	Harry Brecheen (6–1)	**Russ Meyer** (7–8)	None	10,874	45–46
92	July 25	@ Cardinals	2–0	**Robin Roberts** (13–8)	Cliff Chambers (6–9)	None	10,239	46–46
93	July 26	@ Cardinals	7–0	**Ken Johnson** (2–1)	Tom Poholsky (4–9)	None	9,881	47–46
94	July 27	@ Cubs	2–0	**Bubba Church** (12–5)	Frank Hiller (6–8)	None	5,206	48–46
95	July 28	@ Cubs	1–0	**Russ Meyer** (8–8)	Cal McLish (2–4)	None	10,806	49–46
96	July 29 (1)^{^{[b]}}	@ Cubs	4–5	Bob Kelly (2–0)	**Jim Konstanty** (4–9)	None	see 2nd game	49–47
97	July 29 (2)^{^{[b]}}	@ Cubs	6–8	Dutch Leonard (9–3)	**Bubba Church** (12–6)	Monk Dubiel (1)	25,840	49–48
98	July 30	@ Reds	5–6	Frank Smith (5–2)	**Jim Konstanty** (4–10)	None	4,034	49–49
99	July 31	@ Reds	7–5	**Andy Hansen** (1–0)	Frank Smith (5–3)	**Ken Heintzelman** (1)	13,135	50–49

August (13–17)

#	Date	Opponent	Score	Win	Loss	Save	Attendance	Record
100	August 1	@ Reds	0–1	Ken Raffensberger (11–11)	**Russ Meyer** (8–9)	None	2,289	50–50
101	August 2	@ Reds	7–5	**Bob Miller** (2–1)	Ken Raffensberger (11–12)	**Ken Heintzelman** (2)	2,428	51–50
102	August 3	@ Pirates	5–4	**Robin Roberts** (14–8)	Vern Law (3–7)	None	13,607	52–50
103	August 4	@ Pirates	3–7	Murry Dickson (14–10)	**Ken Johnson** (2–2)	None	7,206	52–51
104	August 5 (1)	@ Pirates	5–1	**Bubba Church** (13–6)	Bob Friend (4–8)	None	see 2nd game	53–51
105	August 5 (2)	@ Pirates	12–7	**Ken Heintzelman** (5–8)	Ted Wilks (2–4)	**Jim Konstanty** (8)	20,049	54–51
106	August 7 (1)	Braves	3–1	**Robin Roberts** (15–8)	Max Surkont (9–9)	None	see 2nd game	55–51
107	August 7 (2)	Braves	1–0 (15)	**Ken Heintzelman** (6–8)	Warren Spahn (13–10)	None	19,125	56–51
108	August 8	Braves	3–2	**Ken Johnson** (3–2)	Jim Wilson (3–3)	**Jim Konstanty** (9)	12,759	57–51
109	August 9	Braves	4–5	Chet Nichols (6–3)	**Bubba Church** (13–7)	None	4,840	57–52
–	August 10	@ Giants	Postponed (rain); Makeup: August 12 as a traditional double-header					
110	August 11	@ Giants	4–0	**Robin Roberts** (16–8)	Jim Hearn (10–7)	None	8,160	58–52
111	August 12 (1)	@ Giants	2–3	Sal Maglie (16–5)	**Jocko Thompson** (3–7)	None	see 2nd game	58–53
112	August 12 (2)	@ Giants	1–2	Al Corwin (3–0)	**Ken Johnson** (3–3)	None	17,072	58–54
113	August 13	@ Giants	2–5	Larry Jansen (15–9)	**Bubba Church** (13–8)	Dave Koslo (3)	8,182	58–55
114	August 14	@ Braves	2–4	Chet Nichols (7–3)	**Robin Roberts** (16–9)	None	5,578	58–56
115	August 15	@ Braves	0–9	Warren Spahn (14–11)	**Ken Johnson** (3–4)	None	2,907	58–57
116	August 17	Giants	5–8	George Spencer (8–4)	**Ken Heintzelman** (6–9)	None	20,683	58–58
117	August 18	Giants	0–2	Larry Jansen (16–9)	**Robin Roberts** (16–10)	None	20,652	58–59
118	August 19	Giants	4–5	Al Corwin (4–0)	**Ken Heintzelman** (6–10)	None	12,515	58–60
119	August 21	Cubs	4–1	**Ken Johnson** (4–4)	Cal McLish (3–8)	**Bubba Church** (1)	7,683	59–60
120	August 22	Cubs	4–0	**Robin Roberts** (17–10)	Bob Rush (8–8)	None	6,632	60–60
121	August 24	Pirates	1–5	Murry Dickson (17–11)	**Jocko Thompson** (3–8)	None	8,847	60–61
122	August 25	Pirates	2–3 (12)	Don Carlsen (2–0)	**Jim Konstanty** (4–11)	None	5,276	60–62
123	August 26 (1)	Reds	2–4	Ewell Blackwell (14–11)	**Robin Roberts** (17–11)	None	see 2nd game	60–63
124	August 26 (2)	Reds	2–0	**Niles Jordan** (1–0)	Willie Ramsdell (9–13)	None	13,899	61–63
125	August 27 (1)	Reds	2–0	**Jocko Thompson** (4–8)	Herm Wehmeier (2–9)	None	see 2nd game	62–63
126	August 27 (2)	Reds	3–0	**Ken Johnson** (5–4)	Ken Raffensberger (12–17)	None	9,766	63–63
127	August 28	Cardinals	0–2	Max Lanier (9–8)	**Bubba Church** (13–9)	None	9,048	63–64
128	August 29	Cardinals	2–3	Gerry Staley (15–13)	**Ken Heintzelman** (6–11)	Harry Brecheen (1)	20,717	63–65
129	August 30	Cardinals	3–6	Al Brazle (4–2)	**Niles Jordan** (1–1)	Harry Brecheen (2)	10,297	63–66

September (10–15)

#	Date	Opponent	Score	Win	Loss	Save	Attendance	Record
130	September 1	Braves	4–9	Warren Spahn (18–11)	**Ken Heintzelman** (6–12)	None	7,439	63–67
131	September 2	Braves	5–3 (6)	**Andy Hansen** (2–0)	Dave Cole (1–4)	None	5,544	64–67
132	September 3 (1)	@ Giants	6–3	**Robin Roberts** (18–11)	Al Corwin (5–1)	None	see 2nd game	65–67
133	September 3 (2)	@ Giants	1–3	Dave Koslo (7–9)	**Niles Jordan** (1–2)	None	31,397	65–68
134	September 5	@ Dodgers	2–5	Ralph Branca (13–6)	**Ken Johnson** (5–5)	None	23,130	65–69
–	September 6	@ Dodgers	Postponed (rain); Makeup: September 21					
135	September 7	@ Dodgers	6–11	Preacher Roe (19–2)	**Robin Roberts** (18–12)	None	12,589	65–70
136	September 8	@ Braves	0–5	Chet Nichols (9–6)	**Bubba Church** (13–10)	None	2,629	65–71
137	September 9 (1)	@ Braves	4–5	Warren Spahn (19–12)	**Ken Johnson** (5–6)	None	see 2nd game	65–72
138	September 9 (2)	@ Braves	1–4	Dave Cole (2–4)	**Niles Jordan** (1–3)	None	8,588	65–73
139	September 11	@ Pirates	3–2	**Robin Roberts** (19–12)	Don Carlsen (2–3)	None	8,152	66–73
140	September 12	@ Pirates	6–8	Vern Law (6–9)	**Andy Hansen** (2–1)	Ted Wilks (10)	2,364	66–74
141	September 14	@ Reds	10–4	**Bubba Church** (14–10)	Willie Ramsdell (9–16)	None	3,588	67–74
142	September 15	@ Reds	5–2	**Niles Jordan** (2–3)	Herm Wehmeier (5–10)	**Robin Roberts** (2)	1,795	68–74
143	September 16	@ Cardinals	2–9	Gerry Staley (17–13)	**Ken Johnson** (5–7)	None	11,942	68–75
144	September 17	@ Cardinals	2–1 (10)	**Robin Roberts** (20–12)	Al Brazle (6–4)	None	4,525	69–75
145	September 18	@ Cubs	4–7	Cal McLish (4–10)	**Lou Possehl** (0–1)	Johnny Klippstein (2)	2,929	69–76
146	September 19	@ Cubs	5–1	**Bubba Church** (15–10)	Bob Rush (9–11)	None	3,792	70–76
147	September 21	@ Dodgers	9–6	**Robin Roberts** (21–12)	Clem Labine (4–1)	None	23,753	71–76
148	September 22	@ Dodgers	7–3	**Karl Drews** (1–0)	Don Newcombe (18–9)	None	30,723	72–76
149	September 23	@ Dodgers	2–6	Preacher Roe (22–2)	**Bubba Church** (15–11)	None	19,135	72–77
150	September 25	Giants	1–5	Jim Hearn (16–9)	**Robin Roberts** (21–13)	Sal Maglie (4)	7,219	72–78
151	September 26	Giants	1–10	Larry Jansen (21–11)	**Ken Johnson** (5–8)	None	14,009	72–79
152	September 28	Dodgers	4–3	**Andy Hansen** (3–1)	Carl Erskine (16–12)	None	18,895	73–79
153	September 29	Dodgers	0–5	Don Newcombe (20–9)	**Robin Roberts** (21–14)	None	28,408	73–80
154	September 30	Dodgers	8–9 (14)	Bud Podbielan (2–2)	**Robin Roberts** (21–15)	None	31,755	73–81

^{^[a]}The second game on July 22 was suspended (Sunday curfew) after seven innings with the score 0–1 and was completed August 21, 1951, with new umpires.
^{^[b]}The original game schedule indicated Philadelphia at Chicago for single games on July 29 and September 20.

=== Roster ===
1951 Philadelphia Phillies
**Roster**
**Pitchers**: 41 Jack Brittin; 18 Milo Candini; 23 Bubba Church; 38 Leo Cristante; 22 Karl Drews; 20 Andy Hansen; 27 Ken Heintzelman; 39 Ken Johnson; 41 Niles Jordan; 35 Jim Konstanty; 34 Russ Meyer; 19 Bob Miller; 16 Lou Possehl; 36 Robin Roberts; 33 Jocko Thompson	**Catchers**: 29 Stan Lopata; 21 Andy Seminick; 25 Ken Silvestri; 10 Del Wilber; **Infielders**: 37,5 Jimmy Bloodworth; 3 Putsy Caballero; 9 Mike Goliat; 2 Granny Hamner; 6 Willie Jones; 13 Eddie Pellagrini; 4 Eddie Waitkus; 9 Dick Young	**Outfielders**: 1 Richie Ashburn; 37,5 Tommy Brown; 37 Mel Clark; 14 Del Ennis; 15 Jackie Mayo; 12 Bill Nicholson; 15 Ed Sanicki; 8 Dick Sisler; 37 Dick Whitman; **Other batters**: 17 Stan Hollmig	**Manager**: 24 Eddie Sawyer; **Coaches**: 11 Benny Bengough; 32 Dusty Cooke; 40 Maje McDonnell; 31 Cy Perkins

== Player stats ==
=== Batting ===
==== Starters by position ====
Note: Pos = Position; G = Games played; AB = At bats; H = Hits; Avg. = Batting average; HR = Home runs; RBI = Runs batted in

Pos	Player	G	AB	H	Avg.	HR	RBI
C	Andy Seminick	101	291	66	.227	11	37
1B	Eddie Waitkus	145	610	157	.257	1	46
2B	Putsy Caballero	84	161	30	.186	1	11
SS	Granny Hamner	150	589	150	.255	9	72
3B	Willie Jones	148	564	161	.285	22	81
OF	Dick Sisler	125	428	123	.287	8	52
OF	Del Ennis	144	532	142	.267	15	73
OF	Richie Ashburn	154	643	221	.344	4	63

==== Other batters ====
Note: G = Games played; AB = At bats; H = Hits; Avg. = Batting average; HR = Home runs; RBI = Runs batted in

Player	G	AB	H	Avg.	HR	RBI
Del Wilber	84	245	68	.278	8	34
Eddie Pellagrini	86	197	46	.234	5	30
Tommy Brown	78	196	43	.219	10	32
Bill Nicholson	85	170	41	.241	8	30
Mike Goliat	41	138	31	.225	4	15
Dick Young	15	68	16	.235	0	2
Jimmy Bloodworth	21	42	6	.143	0	1
Mel Clark	10	31	10	.323	1	3
Dick Whitman	19	17	2	.118	0	0
Ken Silvestri	4	9	2	.222	0	1
Jackie Mayo	9	7	1	.143	0	0
Stan Lopata	3	5	0	.000	0	0
Ed Sanicki	13	4	2	.500	0	1
Stan Hollmig	2	2	0	.000	0	0

=== Pitching ===
==== Starting pitchers ====
Note: G = Games pitched; IP = Innings pitched; W = Wins; L = Losses; ERA = Earned run average; SO = Strikeouts

Player	G	IP	W	L	ERA	SO
Robin Roberts	44	315.0	21	15	3.03	127
Bubba Church	38	247.0	15	11	3.53	104
Russ Meyer	28	168.0	8	9	3.48	65
Ken Johnson	20	106.1	5	8	4.57	58
Niles Jordan	5	36.2	2	3	3.19	11

==== Other pitchers ====
Note: G = Games pitched; IP = Innings pitched; W = Wins; L = Losses; ERA = Earned run average; SO = Strikeouts

Player	G	IP	W	L	ERA	SO
Jocko Thompson	29	119.1	4	8	3.85	60
Ken Heintzelman	35	118.1	6	12	4.18	55
Karl Drews	5	23.0	1	0	6.26	13
Lou Possehl	2	6.0	0	1	6.00	6

==== Relief pitchers ====
Note: G = Games pitched; W = Wins; L = Losses; SV = Saves; ERA = Earned run average; SO = Strikeouts

Player	G	W	L	SV	ERA	SO
Jim Konstanty	58	4	11	9	4.05	27
Andy Hansen	24	3	1	0	2.54	11
Milo Candini	18	1	0	0	2.70	10
Bob Miller	17	2	1	0	6.82	10
Leo Cristante	10	1	1	0	4.91	6
Jack Brittin	3	0	0	0	9.00	3

== Farm system ==
Level	Team	League	Manager
AAA	Baltimore Orioles	International League	Nick Cullop
A	Schenectady Blue Jays	Eastern League	Leon Riley
B	Terre Haute Phillies	Illinois–Indiana–Iowa League	Skeeter Newsome
B	Wilmington Blue Rocks	Interstate League	Dan Carnevale
C	Pittsfield Phillies	Canadian–American League	Dick Carter
C	Grand Forks Chiefs	Northern League	Eddie Murphy
C	Salt Lake City Bees	Pioneer League	Hub Kittle
C	Salina Blue Jays	Western Association	Floyd "Pat" Patterson
D	Elizabethton Phils	Appalachian League	John Davenport and Donald Marshall
D	Klamath Falls Gems	Far West League	Bill DeCarlo
D	Lima Phillies	Ohio–Indiana League	Barney Lutz
D	Bradford Phillies	PONY League	Frank McCormick and John Davenport

LEAGUE CHAMPIONS: Wilmington, Grand Forks, Klamath Falls
