= Stan Lopata =

American baseball player (1925–2013)

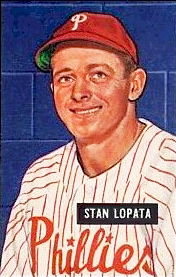
- Catcher
- Born: September 12, 1925; Delray, Michigan, U.S.
- Died: June 15, 2013 (aged 87); Philadelphia, Pennsylvania, U.S.
- Batted: Right Threw: Right

MLB debut
- September 19, 1948, for the Philadelphia Phillies

Last MLB appearance
- June 12, 1960, for the Milwaukee Braves

MLB statistics
- Batting average: .254
- Home runs: 116
- Runs batted in: 397
- Stats at Baseball Reference

Teams
- Philadelphia Phillies (1948–1958); Milwaukee Braves (1959–1960)

Career highlights and awards
- 2× All-Star (1955, 1956)

Stanley Edward Lopata (September 12, 1925 – June 15, 2013) was an American professional baseball player. A catcher, Lopata played in Major League Baseball for 13 seasons in the National League with the Philadelphia Phillies and Milwaukee Braves. In 853 career games, Lopata recorded a batting average of .254 and accumulated 661 hits, 116 home runs, and 379 runs batted in (RBI).

A two-time all-star, he was the first National League catcher to wear glasses.

== Early life ==
Born in Delray, a neighborhood of Detroit, to foundry worker Anthony Lopata and Agnes Lopata, both born in Poland and came to the United States in 1911. Stanley was the youngest of five children having two sisters, Wanda and Bertha, and two brothers, Casimir and Chester. Lopata was a graduate of Southwestern High School. He was a classmate of Harold Schultz. Stan went into the Army in December 1943 and served with the 14th Armored Division in Europe, he saw heavy action and was awarded the Bronze Star and the Purple Heart before his discharge in late 1945.

Lopata began his professional baseball career in the minor leagues with the Terre Haute Phillies of the Class B Illinois–Indiana–Iowa League in 1946 after the big-league Philadelphia club signed him to a $20,000 bonus. The Phillies discovered Lopata when he emerged as a star in the sandlots of Detroit, Michigan, as well as the tough American Legion Baseball league. He did well in his first season for Terre Haute, posting up a .292 batting average with a .540 slugging percentage, 9 home runs, and 11 triples in just 67 games played.

Lopata was very successful in 1947. He was still a few years of seasoning away from the majors, but in March Phillies manager Ben Chapman made it clear that he wanted Lopata to be their second-string catcher behind current starter Andy Seminick. Lopata was promoted to the Utica Blue Sox of the Class A Eastern League, and made the most of it by hitting .325 with 9 home runs, 13 triples, and 196 total bases in 115 games en route to earning the league's Most Valuable Player award. Lopata played a key role in leading the Blue Sox to their first ever league title, tying the championship series with the Albany Senators after hitting a home run in the 13th inning to give his team the 3–2 victory.

Lopata continued his rise through the minor league ranks in 1948 for the baseball Toronto Maple Leafs of the Class AAA International League. He once again put up consistent and powerful numbers: a .279 batting average, 15 home runs, and 67 RBI in 110 games. Lopata had a league record shattering day on May 20 when he drove in eight runs off two home runs, breaking the old Roosevelt Stadium record of runs batted in for a single game of 7 set by Albie Glosop in 1939. Around this time, major league scouts labeled Lopata as a "can't miss" prospect.

== Philadelphia Phillies ==
On September 13, 1948, Lopata finally received his call to the majors along with four of his teammates (Lou Possehl, Jocko Thompson, Jim Konstanty, and Willie "Puddin' Head" Jones) from the AAA Toronto Maple Leafs. He got his first start in the second game of a doubleheader against the Pittsburgh Pirates on September 19, playing catcher and batting 8th in the order. He went 0 for 4 in the game. On the next day, Lopata was called upon again to start the second game of a doubleheader, this time getting his first hit, a double. He would be used as a pinch hitter in three more games and have another uneventful start on September 28 at the New York Giants before his season came to a close. In 15 at-bats, Lopata had 2 hits, driving in 2 runs.

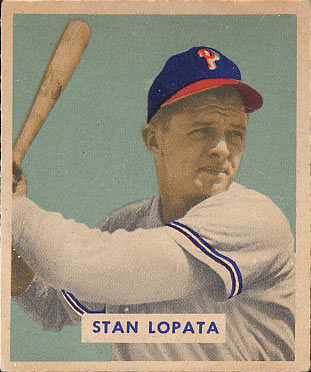
Stan Lopata with the Philadelphia Phillies in 1949.

On February 6, 1949, Lopata signed a contract with the Philadelphia Phillies, joining five other catchers on the squad going into spring training. The rookie impressed manager Eddie Sawyer so much in spring training that he initially won the role of starting catcher from six-year veteran Andy Seminick, citing that he was "the most improved player on the club." He was said to be a product of club president Bob Carpenter's "youth movement." The Phillies had the youngest team in the majors that year, calling themselves the "Fighting Phillies of '49," determined to improve upon their dreadful record of 66–88 from the 1948 season. Despite having the starting job, Lopata split time with Seminick, eventually playing in less games than Seminick and also providing much less offensive support. Despite putting up relatively average numbers of a .271 batting average, 8 home runs, and 27 RBI in 83 games, the 23-year-old's first full season was generally regarded as a success. One reporter recalled that Lopata "hit one of the longest homers Sunday at Shibe Park since the days of (Jimmie) Foxx."

Before the start of the 1950 season, Lopata's status as starter or backup was not established until mid-March as Seminick was holding out for a sufficient contract. He was reportedly the "last of the club's holdouts", and "appeared eager to sign after (Bob) Carpenter informed him his substitute, Stan Lopata" had hit three towering home runs over the deep left field wall at the Phillies' training park in Clearwater, Florida. Seminick got the starting role, with Lopata coming in as the backup. The season saw less playing time for Stan, hitting just .209 with 1 home run and 11 RBI in 58 games. The Phillies, dubbed the Whiz Kids due to their youthful roster age, won the National League pennant, before being swept in four straight games in the 1950 World Series by the New York Yankees. Lopata was used very sparingly in the World Series, but earned the dubious honor of recording the final out of the series, striking out to a cutter from Yankees pitcher Allie Reynolds.

1951 was full of downs for Lopata. On April 27, he was optioned to the Class AAA International League Baltimore Orioles. He struggled with injuries throughout the season, which led to a lackluster season of a .196 average in just 38 games.

In September 1951, The Phillies announced that Lopata would be taken to their spring training squad for the 1952 season. On January 31, 1952, he signed a new contract with Philadelphia, taking what was regarded as a "slight" pay cut from his 1951 salary. He successfully earned a spot on the roster, but again was used sparingly, mostly towards the tail end of the season. Lopata finished the season with a fair .274 average to go with 4 home runs and 27 RBI in 57 games.

On January 31, 1953, Lopata signed another contract to continue playing with the Phillies. Lopata split time with all-star Smoky Burgess, posting a .239 average and 31 RBI in 86 games.

1954 would prove to be Lopata's most interesting year yet. On February 11, 1954, he signed his new contract with the Phillies. Midway through the 1954 season, Lopata started to assume a new, very low batting stance. Dizzy Dean remarked that, "He looks like a man hittin' from an easy chair." Stan met with Rogers Hornsby in Chicago, where Hornsby helped inspire Lopata to assume his new batting stance. He tried various stances in batting practice before settling with a semi-squat. The first time it was seen by opposing players and the fans, he was considered a laughingstock. However, the laughs quickly subsided, as Lopata had 10 hits in his first 22 at-bats. The stance has since been related to that of Jeff Bagwell. In June the once quiet bat of Lopata erupted with a flurry of offensive output, hitting .396 with 2 home runs and 10 RBI in 53 at-bats. It got to the point where pitchers and managers tried to argue that his stance was illegal, but to no avail. Around this time, Stan also began to wear tinted glasses because he had trouble picking up the ball due to the glare from the lights of the Connie Mack Stadium scoreboard thus, becoming the first catcher in National League history to wear glasses. The St. Louis Cardinals were his favorite victim to try his new batting stance on, hitting .353 with 5 home runs and 11 RBI in the 12 games played that season. On July 30, Lopata slugged two home runs off the Cardinals' hurler Harvey Haddix in a 12–3 losing effort. The 1954 season as a whole was far and away his most successful season yet, raising his average to .290 while hitting 14 home runs and driving in 42 runs in 86 games. One odd footnote from the 1954 season was a game on July 18 against the St. Louis Cardinals in which, both Lopata and Cardinals catcher Bill Sarni played the game without wearing chest protectors because of the intense heat.

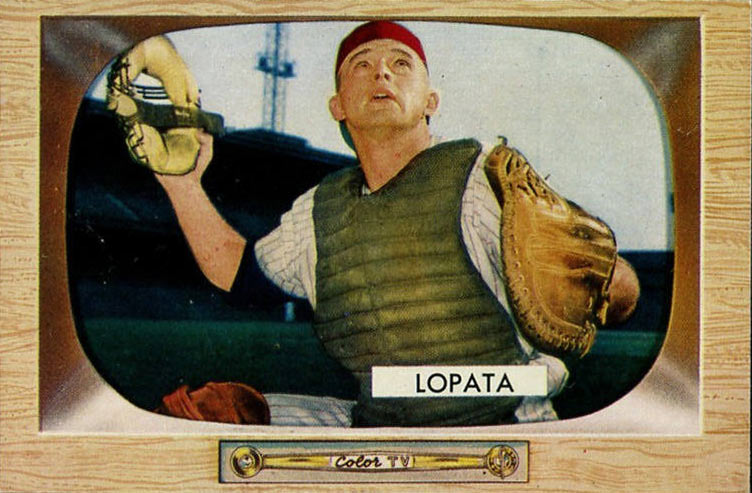
Lopata poses in his Phillies catcher's gear in 1955.

Before the 1955 season, some teams expressed interest in acquiring the newly rejuvenated Lopata from the Phillies, including the upstart Milwaukee Braves. Phillies General Manager Roy Hamey recalled Lopata's performance from the 1954 season, saying that he thought Lopata was one of the better catchers in the league for the last three months of the season. The Phillies intended to keep Lopata on their squad. Initially, Lopata split time with Burgess, but on April 30, Burgess was traded to the Cincinnati Reds for former Phillies starting catcher Andy Seminick. Nonetheless, Lopata continued his stellar play, raising enough eyebrows that he joined the National League all-stars as a replacement for the injured Brooklyn Dodger all-time great Roy Campanella. In the 1955 All-Star Game, Lopata pinch hit for former teammate Smoky Burgess with the National League losing 5–0. He reached first base on an error, allowing Hank Aaron to score their first run of the game. The National League would go on to win 6–5 in 12 innings, with Lopata staying in to finish the game.

Phillies First baseman Marv Blaylock struggled against left-handed pitchers, so the decision was made to start Lopata at first base whenever the Phillies were up against a southpaw pitcher. He played 25 games at first base in 1955, hitting .316 with 8 home runs and 18 RBI. However, Stan felt more comfortable playing from the catcher position. His season was more successful than the last, hitting .272 with 22 home runs and 58 RBI in 99 games. In bases loaded situations, he hit .571 with a homer and 11 RBI. Lopata was an honorable mention for the National League Comeback Player of the Year Award, which eventually went to Roy Campanella.

Lopata survived a scare on September 4, 1955, after collapsing twice in a game against the New York Giants. First he collapsed on the field, then he collapsed again in the dressing room following a three-run home run. He was taken to the Temple University Hospital and was believed to be suffering from a "delayed reaction from being hit on the head by a pitched ball." A doctor at the hospital eventually said that Lopata was in satisfactory condition. He was released from the hospital on September 6 and returned to active duty at the Cincinnati Reds on September 8, drawing two walks and scoring a run en route to a 6–4 victory.

Lopata's rise to stardom continued in 1956. Before the season even started, Lopata wowed fans against the Cincinnati Reds in an exhibition game by hitting a towering home run for 510 feet. On February 15, Lopata signed a new deal with the Phillies. There was talk of moving Lopata from catcher to first base on a full-time basis during spring training, but he spent most of his time at catcher for the season, sitting behind home plate in 100 games while playing at first in 38.

Lopata started the 1956 season by splitting time with Seminick, but after a slow start by Seminick, Lopata finally emerged as an everyday player, making the most of it by slamming 32 home runs while driving in 95 runs in 146 games. Stan had many highlights that year. He had a walk-off home run against the Milwaukee Braves on June 27 in the bottom of the 11th inning to win the game 4–3. Lopata finished fourth in the fan voting for catchers on the National League all-star roster, tallying 16,197 votes. He received his second all-star nomination when a roster spot opened up after Braves catcher Del Crandall was injured and unable to play. On August 11, Lopata ended Brooklyn Dodgers hurler Don Newcombe's 39 2/3 scoreless innings streak with a two-run home run in a 5–2 losing effort. Lopata led all major league catchers in slugging percentage by posting up a .535 mark. His 32 home runs set a since-broken Phillies' team record for right-handed batters. The Phillies had a lackluster season overall with a 71–83 record, but management did not fault Lopata. They had so much faith in him that after the season was over, they stated that every player on the roster was subject to possible trade except for Lopata.

1957 started to show some decline in Lopata's performance. On January 25, he signed a new contract with the Phillies that reportedly had a "substantial increase." Lopata started being plagued with nagging injuries in July, injuring his shoulder in one game and pulled a muscle only a few days later. It would take more than two weeks for him to recover enough to start again as catcher. On July 21, he made the most of his return by hitting two solo home runs in a 6–4 defeat against Cincinnati. Lopata finished the month by homering in two consecutive games on July 30 and 31, and continued his streak into August by hitting a homer on August 1 and 2. Despite the surge of power, Lopata's numbers were diminished from his previous all-star year, putting up a .237 batting average to go with 18 home runs and 67 RBI in 116 games. Despite the lowered numbers, he still had the best offensive output out of all catchers in the National League. He never did quite get over the knee injury he sustained earlier in the season. In October he was given orders by his doctor to exercise to strengthen his ligaments in his right knee, and began training at Connie Mack Stadium to get back in shape for the upcoming 1958 season.

After the 1957 season, Phillies management made it clear that they were looking for a new backup catcher for Lopata. He signed his new contract in January 1958, marking his 11th season with the Phillies. Throughout spring training, Lopata did daily exercises for his injured knee, trying to get it strong enough to hold up for the 1958 season. He got off to a slow start in the season, and by the end of May the fans had turned on their once local favorite. His woes continued on June 8 when Larry Jackson out of St. Louis hit Lopata in the head with a pitch. It was reported to not be serious, but he would not be released from the hospital until three days later on June 11. Lopata suffered yet another injury in July, playing in only seven games that month. He finished the season with a .248 average to go with 9 home runs and 33 RBI in 86 games. After the season ended, Lopata was asked to join Willie Mays' National League "All-Star" Team for an exhibition game against an American League All-Star team put together by Mickey Mantle in New York City.

== Milwaukee Braves and retirement ==
In January 1959, Lopata signed a new contract with the Philadelphia Phillies, taking a pay cut. He played through spring training with the Phils, but ended up being traded to the Milwaukee Braves on March 31, 1959 along with Ted Kazanski and Johnny O'Brien for Gene Conley, Harry Hanebrink, and Joe Koppe. Lopata was initially very optimistic about the move. He said his knee was strong again, and was looking forward to playing in front of the "friendly crowds in Milwaukee." However, it failed to pan out. Lopata was used sparingly throughout much of the season, failing to get a single hit until July 16. He finished the season with a .104 average in just 48 at-bats. On October 26, Lopata was officially released by the Braves.

The Braves agreed to bring back Lopata for the 1960 season by having him sign a contract on February 9. Manager Charlie Dressen immediately designated him as the second string catcher behind starter Del Crandall. Dressen had faith that Lopata's 1959 season was an aberration and not a trend, adding that he would try to get Stan into more games that season. He hit well in spring training, including a walk-off home run against the Reds in the bottom of the 12th inning on April 6 in Jacksonville, Florida. In the regular season, however, Lopata only appeared in 7 games for the Braves before being optioned to the minor league Class AAA Louisville Colonels of the American Association. He hit .246 with 12 home runs and 28 RBI in 55 games for the Colonels. Lopata received one more call up to the majors on September 12, but he did not play in any games and was soon sent back to Louisville. Lopata's final professional game ended on a high note, as he helped Louisville win the "Little World Series" 5–1 against Toronto of the International League. Lopata received his unconditional release from the Braves on October 14, bringing his professional career to a close at the age of 34.

== Playing style ==
Lopata had an "extreme crouch" at the plate, according to New York Giants star pitcher Sal Maglie. This made his strike zone "awfully small," in Maglie's words.

== After baseball ==
On June 3, 1969, the 1950 National League Pennant Winning Philadelphia Philliles, nicknamed the "Whiz Kids", had an exhibition game against a local team. Lopata batted cleanup, hitting a home run in the first inning. The Whiz Kids were victorious 10–1.

After his professional baseball career was over, Lopata made a living by working at a steel plant in Dearborn, Michigan, later moving back to Philadelphia to work as a salesman for IBM. He later worked for a concrete company in Philadelphia, retiring as vice president of sales. In 1988, Lopata was inducted into the Pennsylvania Sports Hall of Fame, and nine years later, on June 12, 1997, he was also inducted into the National Polish American Sports Hall of Fame.

== Personal life ==
Lopata married Betty Kulczyk, who lived in the next block in Detroit, on October 25, 1947. Stanley and Betty had seven children, 16 grandchildren, and eight great-grandchildren In July 1949, Stan went on a brief bereavement from the ballclub when the front office notified him that he had become a father. Lopata died of heart complications on June 15, 2013, at the University of Pennsylvania Hospital.
