= 1951 St. Louis Cardinals season =

Major League Baseball season

1951 St. Louis Cardinals
- League: National League
- Ballpark: Sportsman's Park
- City: St. Louis, Missouri
- Record: 81–73 (.526)
- League place: 3rd
- Owners: Fred Saigh
- General managers: William Walsingham Jr.
- Managers: Marty Marion
- Television: KSD
- Radio: WIL (Harry Caray, Gus Mancuso, Stretch Miller)

The 1951 St. Louis Cardinals season was the team's 70th season in St. Louis, Missouri and the 60th season in the National League. The Cardinals went 81–73 during the season and finished third in the National League.

== Offseason ==
- Prior to 1951 season: Larry Jackson was signed as an amateur free agent by the Cardinals.

== Regular season ==
=== Season standings ===
National League
Team	W	L	Pct.	GB	Home	Road
New York Giants	98	59	.624	—	50‍–‍28	48‍–‍31
Brooklyn Dodgers	97	60	.618	1	49‍–‍29	48‍–‍31
St. Louis Cardinals	81	73	.526	15½	44‍–‍34	37‍–‍39
Boston Braves	76	78	.494	20½	42‍–‍35	34‍–‍43
Philadelphia Phillies	73	81	.474	23½	38‍–‍39	35‍–‍42
Cincinnati Reds	68	86	.442	28½	35‍–‍42	33‍–‍44
Pittsburgh Pirates	64	90	.416	32½	32‍–‍45	32‍–‍45
Chicago Cubs	62	92	.403	34½	32‍–‍45	30‍–‍47

=== Record vs. opponents ===
1951 National League record Sources:
Team	BSN	BRO	CHC	CIN	NYG	PHI	PIT	STL
Boston	—	10–12–1	10–12	10–12	8–14	12–10	13–9	13–9
Brooklyn	12–10–1	—	14–8	14–8	14–11	15–7	10–12	18–4
Chicago	12–10	8–14	—	10–12	7–15	7–15	9–13	9–13–1
Cincinnati	12–10	8–14	12–10	—	5–17	11–11	12–10–1	8–14
New York	14–8	11–14	15–7	17–5	—	16–6	14–8	11–11
Philadelphia	10–12	7–15	15–7	11–11	6–16	—	15–7	9–13
Pittsburgh	9–13	12–10	13–9	10–12–1	8–14	7–15	—	5–17
St. Louis	9–13	4–18	13–9–1	14–8	11–11	13–9	17–5	—

=== Notable transactions ===
- May 14, 1951: Don Bollweg and $15,000 were traded by the Cardinals to the New York Yankees for Billy Johnson.
- June 15, 1951: Joe Garagiola, Dick Cole, Bill Howerton, Howie Pollet, and Ted Wilks were traded by the Cardinals to the Pittsburgh Pirates for Cliff Chambers and Wally Westlake.

=== Roster ===
1951 St. Louis Cardinals
Roster
Pitchers: 25 Dick Bokelmann; 24 Cloyd Boyer; 27 Al Brazle; 31 Harry Brecheen; 28 Cliff Chambers; 32 Jackie Collum; 25,26 Jack Crimian; 25 Erv Dusak; 22 Bob Habenicht; 30 Kurt Krieger; 23 Max Lanier; 34 Dan Lewandowski; 20 Red Munger; 29 Tom Poholsky; 11 Howie Pollet; 21 Joe Presko; 14 Gerry Staley; 28 Ted Wilks	Catchers: 17 Joe Garagiola; 18 Del Rice; 16 Bill Sarni; 30 Bob Scheffing; Infielders: 36 Vern Benson; 5 Steve Bilko; 40 Don Bollweg; 15 Dick Cole; 7 Solly Hemus; 1 Billy Johnson; 3 Nippy Jones; 1 Eddie Kazak; 19 Rocky Nelson; 38 Don Richmond; 19 Stan Rojek; 2 Red Schoendienst	Outfielders: 34 Larry Ciaffone; 32 Chuck Diering; 12 Tommy Glaviano; 36 Bill Howerton; 37 Peanuts Lowrey; 6 Stan Musial; 39 Hal Rice; 9 Enos Slaughter; 36 Jay Van Noy; 38 Harry Walker; 17 Wally Westlake	Manager: 4 Marty Marion; Coaches: 33 Ray Blades; 8 Terry Moore; 35 Mike Ryba; 26 Buzzy Wares

== Player stats ==
= Indicates team leader

= Indicates league leader

=== Batting ===
==== Starters by position ====
Note: Pos = Position; G = Games played; AB = At bats; H = Hits; Avg. = Batting average; HR = Home runs; RBI = Runs batted in

Pos	Player	G	AB	H	Avg.	HR	RBI
C	Del Rice	122	374	94	.251	9	47
1B	Nippy Jones	80	300	79	.263	3	41
2B	Red Schoendienst	135	553	160	.289	6	54
SS	Solly Hemus	120	420	118	.281	2	32
3B	Billy Johnson	124	442	116	.262	14	64
OF	Stan Musial	152	578	205	.355	32	108
OF	Peanuts Lowrey	114	370	112	.303	5	40
OF	Enos Slaughter	123	409	115	.281	4	64

==== Other batters ====
Note: G = Games played; AB = At bats; H = Hits; Avg. = Batting average; HR = Home runs; RBI = Runs batted in

Player	G	AB	H	Avg.	HR	RBI
Wally Westlake	73	267	68	.255	6	39
Hal Rice	69	236	60	.254	4	38
Stan Rojek	51	186	51	.274	0	14
Tommy Glaviano	54	104	19	.183	1	4
Bill Sarni	36	86	15	.174	0	2
Chuck Diering	64	85	22	.259	0	8
Joe Garagiola	27	72	14	.194	2	9
Steve Bilko	21	72	16	.222	2	12
Bill Howerton	24	65	17	.262	1	4
Vern Benson	13	46	12	.261	1	7
Dick Cole	15	36	7	.194	0	3
Don Richmond	12	34	3	.088	1	4
Eddie Kazak	11	33	6	.182	0	4
Harry Walker	8	26	8	.308	0	2
Bob Scheffing	12	18	2	.111	0	2
Rocky Nelson	9	18	4	.222	0	1
Don Bollweg	6	9	1	.111	0	2
Jay Van Noy	6	7	0	.000	0	0
Larry Ciaffone	5	5	0	.000	0	0

=== Pitching ===
==== Starting pitchers ====
Note: G = Games pitched; IP = Innings pitched; W = Wins; L = Losses; ERA = Earned run average; SO = Strikeouts

Player	G	IP	W	L	ERA	SO
Gerry Staley	42	227.0	19	13	3.81	67
Tom Poholsky	38	195.0	7	13	4.43	70
Max Lanier	31	160.0	11	9	3.26	59
Harry Brecheen	24	138.2	8	4	3.25	57
Cliff Chambers	21	129.1	11	6	3.83	45
Joe Presko	15	88.2	7	4	3.45	38

==== Other pitchers ====
Note: G = Games pitched; IP = Innings pitched; W = Wins; L = Losses; ERA = Earned run average; SO = Strikeouts

Player	G	IP	W	L	ERA	SO
Red Munger	23	94.2	4	6	5.32	44
Cloyd Boyer	19	63.1	2	5	5.26	40
Jackie Collum	3	17.0	2	1	1.59	5
Howie Pollet	6	12.1	0	3	4.38	10

==== Relief pitchers ====
Note: G = Games pitched; W = Wins; L = Losses; SV = Saves; ERA = Earned run average; SO = Strikeouts

Player	G	W	L	SV	ERA	SO
Al Brazle	56	6	5	7	3.09	66
Dick Bokelmann	20	3	3	3	3.78	22
Ted Wilks	17	0	0	1	3.00	5
Jack Crimian	11	1	0	0	9.00	5
Erv Dusak	5	0	0	0	7.20	8
Bob Habenicht	3	0	0	0	7.20	1
Kurt Krieger	2	0	0	0	15.75	3
Dan Lewandowski	2	0	1	0	9.00	1

== Awards and honors ==
- Sporting News Player of the Year - Stan Musial
- Stan Musial, National League leader, triples. It was the fifth time in his career that he would lead the NL in triples.

All-Star Game

- Stan Musial, Outfield, Starter
- Red Schoendeist, Second Base, Reserve
- Enos Slaughter, Outfield, Reserve

== Farm system ==
Level	Team	League	Manager
AAA	Columbus Red Birds	American Association	Harry Walker
AAA	Rochester Red Wings	International League	Johnny Keane
AA	Houston Buffaloes	Texas League	Al Hollingsworth
A	Columbus Cardinals	Sally League	Hal Anderson
A	Omaha Cardinals	Western League	George Kissell
B	Winston-Salem Cardinals	Carolina League	Harold Olt
B	Allentown Cardinals	Interstate League	Whitey Kurowski
B	Lynchburg Cardinals	Piedmont League	Skeeter Scalzi
B	Tri-City Braves	Western International League	Charles Peterson
C	Fresno Cardinals	California League	Larry Barton, Sr.
C	Pocatello Cardinals	Pioneer League	Norm Shope and Bob Comiskey
C	St. Joseph Cardinals	Western Association	Gene Corbett
D	Johnson City Cardinals	Appalachian League	Ben Catchings
D	Goldsboro Cardinals	Coastal Plain League	George Ferrell
D	Albany Cardinals	Georgia–Florida League	Sheldon "Chief" Bender
D	Hamilton Cardinals	PONY League	Vedie Himsl

LEAGUE CHAMPIONS: Houston, Winston-Salem
