= Jocko Thompson =

American baseball player (1917–1988)

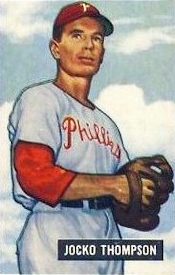
- Thompson, pictured during his Phillies tenure
- Pitcher
- Born: January 17, 1917; Beverly, Massachusetts, U.S.
- Died: February 3, 1988 (aged 71); Olney, Maryland, U.S.
- Batted: Left Threw: Left

MLB debut
- September 21, 1948, for the Philadelphia Phillies

Last MLB appearance
- September 16, 1951, for the Philadelphia Phillies

MLB statistics
- Win–loss record: 6–11
- Earned run average: 4.24
- Strikeouts: 81
- Stats at Baseball Reference

Teams
- Philadelphia Phillies (1948–1951)

John Samuel "Jocko" Thompson (January 17, 1917 – February 3, 1988) was an American professional baseball pitcher. He played all or part of four seasons for the Philadelphia Phillies of Major League Baseball from 1948 to 1951. He also served in the Army of the United States as a first lieutenant in the European theater during World War II. Thompson played in Major League Baseball during the Whiz Kids era during a career which spanned 12 seasons (1940–1941, 1946–1955). After attending Northeastern University, Thompson appeared as a situational pitcher and spot starter during the 1948, 1949, and 1950 seasons with the Phillies, and went 4–8 in his only season as a regular member of the team's starting rotation. After demotion to the minors in 1952, Thompson retired from baseball after the 1955 season.

Before his major league career, Thompson entered the military and participated in Operation Market Garden, where he led a platoon to secure a bridge over the Maas River. He served in the Army from 1941 to 1945. In 2004, the bridge that his platoon captured was renamed in his honor.

== Early career ==
Described as a "fast ball specialist", Thompson played three seasons for the baseball team at Northeastern University, one of six Major League Baseball players to attend the school. During his tenure (1938–1940), the Huskies won 31 games and lost 14, accumulating a .689 winning percentage. After the 1940 college season, Thompson was signed by Major League Baseball's Boston Red Sox as an amateur free agent. The Red Sox assigned Thompson to their D-level affiliate, the Centreville Red Sox, where he posted an 18–5 record and a 1.56 earned run average (ERA) in 27 games. He also played in seven games for the Canton Terriers, winning one and losing one and compiling a 3.41 ERA. Under manager Heinie Manush, Thompson played for the Greensboro Red Sox in the Piedmont League during the 1941 season; he amassed an 8–13 record and a 3.56 ERA in 162 innings pitched.

== Military service ==
Thompson's awards from the U.S. Army included (from top) the Bronze Star, Silver Star, and Purple Heart.

Thompson entered the Army of the United States in 1941 and was assigned to the 504th Parachute Infantry Regiment, a part of the 82nd Airborne Division. In 1944, as a first lieutenant, Thompson led his men during an air raid as part of Operation Market Garden in the German-occupied Netherlands. The light in the jump bay of the platoon's C-47 Skytrain was later than expected, moving their landing zone from its intended location near Grave, Netherlands; the plane was passing over buildings when the paratroopers were signalled to leave the aircraft, and Thompson decided to wait until reaching several approaching fields.

Thompson led his platoon in an attack against the nearby bridge spanning the Maas River, which was defended by German forces supplemented by two 20 mm flak guns, one on the close side of the bridge and one across the river. The platoon opened fire on the German forces, killing four. Two trucks of German soldiers arrived on the scene, but they "showed no desire to fight ... [and] ran away". Thompson's platoon destroyed "electrical equipment and cables that they expected were hooked up to demolitions", and their bazooka operator destroyed the nearer flak gun, permitting the establishment of a roadblock on the bridge while waiting for the remainder of the 82nd Airborne. After the battle at the Maas bridge, Thompson also participated in the Battle of the Bulge, where he was given a field commission, and during the Allied occupation of Berlin, where he served as an aide to General James M. Gavin.

Thompson was wounded twice during the war, for which he received two Purple Hearts; fellow pitcher Robin Roberts later wrote that his Phillies teammates "understood that Jocko still carried around a considerable amount of shrapnel in his body". Other decorations included the Bronze Star with cluster, the Silver Star, and various awards from the Belgian, French, and Dutch governments.

== Return to baseball ==
Thompson returned to baseball with the Scranton Red Sox of the Eastern League for the 1946 season. He was second on the team in innings pitched (180) and finished with a 13–7 record in 26 games (20 starts). For the season, Thompson allowed 164 hits—the most on the team—and 97 walks. The following year, he was promoted to the Toronto Maple Leafs, one of Boston's two Triple-A-level affiliates. After he posted a 6–12 record—the team's worst mark among starters with 30 or more appearances—the Red Sox did not retain Thompson's rights when their working agreement with the Maple Leafs ended. He remained with Toronto and his rights became the property of the Philadelphia Phillies when those two teams established a new agreement.

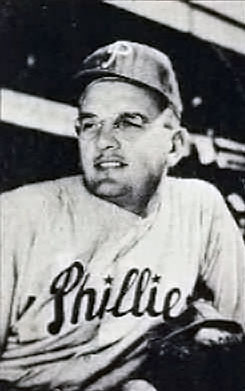
Thompson and Jim Konstanty were called up to the major league club together.

In 1948, Thompson went 12–8 for the Maple Leafs, the second-best win–loss record among the team's regular starting pitchers (20 or more starts). He was third on the team with 161 innings pitched, allowed the most earned runs (91), and posted a 5.09 ERA. At the end of the season, manager Eddie Sawyer called Thompson and Jim Konstanty up to the major league level. As per the working agreement between the teams, the major league club paid Toronto for the rights to each Maple Leafs player it called up: $25,000 ($335,000 in current terms) for the first player, and $5,000 ($67,000 currently) for each player thereafter. Sawyer recalled that Pete Campbell, Toronto's owner, and Konstanty "didn't get along... [because] they were both the same". Although Campbell was "glad to get rid of Konstanty", he told Sawyer to take Thompson as the $25,000 player because he did not want Konstanty to think he was worth the larger fee.

== Major league career ==
=== 1948–1949 ===
Thompson made his major league debut in the second game of a doubleheader on September 21, 1948. He pitched a complete game against the Cincinnati Reds, allowing one run on five hits, striking out five, and walking five batters to collect the first win of his major league career. He appeared in one other game during the 1948 season, pitching four innings in the second game of a doubleheader against the New York Giants on September 28, allowing three runs in a 6–3 Philadelphia victory. Thompson wore the uniform number 9 during his brief call-up.

Thompson began the 1949 season in the Phillies' starting rotation with Roberts, Ken Heintzelman, Russ Meyer, and Curt Simmons, and the Phillies "hoped for contributions" from him and some of his teammates, like Schoolboy Rowe and Blix Donnelly. However, Thompson lost his first two starts, both against the Boston Braves. He was sent down to Toronto, amassing a 14–5 record there for the 1949 season, and was later described as the team's "top pitcher" for that year. His 2.73 ERA was second on the team to right-handed starter Bubba Church; Thompson allowed 44 earned runs in 145 innings. He made a spot start in midseason for the Phillies against the Brooklyn Dodgers, but the Phillies lost 8–4. Thompson did not get his first win in the majors that year until September 19, when he defeated the St. Louis Cardinals behind Howie Pollet, 4–3. He made his final start of the season for the Phillies on September 24, against Don Newcombe and the Dodgers; the Phillies lost, 8–1. Thompson finished 1949 with a 1–3 record at the major league level, with a career-high ERA of 6.89, 12 strikeouts and 11 walks in 31 1/3 innings. For his 1949 appearance, Thompson's uniform number was 37.

=== 1950–1951 ===
Although Thompson was expected to contribute during the 1950 Phillies season and the Whiz Kids' "improbable" run to the pennant, he spent most of the season with Toronto. On June 8, he defeated the Jersey City Giants, 5–3, turning in a four-hit performance and striking out 11 batters. He also took a late-game loss in a doubleheader against the Baltimore Orioles, as they staged a five-run rally in the ninth inning to defeat Toronto. Again described as the team's top pitcher, he amassed 10 wins and 14 losses, a 4.57 ERA, and led the team with 201 innings pitched. As a batter, Thompson hit two doubles, two triples, and batted in nine runs. He was called up late in the season to reinforce a team that Roberts described as "depleted"; within one week's time, the Phillies had lost Church to injury, Simmons to military service, and Bob Miller to a recurring back injury. Thompson appeared in relief of Church after his return on September 15, but the Phillies lost, 5–0, due in part to a Bobby Thomson inside-the-park grand slam. In his 1950 major league appearances, he played in two games, pitching four innings and allowing one run. Although Thompson was on the playoff roster, he made no postseason appearances with the team. His uniform number for the rest of his Phillies career was 33.

1951 was Thompson's only full season as a regular in the major leagues, when he beat out Leo Cristante in spring training to make the team. During the preseason, he and Ken Johnson combined for a 1–0 shutout of the Cardinals. In the regular season, Thompson amassed a 4–8 record in 14 starts. He made a total of 29 appearances on the season, notching a 3.85 ERA. He won his first game of the year against the New York Giants, 8–4, on April 23; it was the Giants' fifth straight loss. His first loss of the season came in April in the first game of a doubleheader against the Braves, losing 1–0 though he held the Braves to two hits. At the plate, Thompson batted .103 with one double and one triple, the latter of which came on June 2 in a 7–3 defeat of St. Louis. The Phillies and the Reds split a doubleheader in July, with Thompson earning the victory in the nightcap; the Phillies won, 10–0. In August, Thompson entered in relief in the first inning of a game against the Pittsburgh Pirates after Russ Meyer was knocked out of the contest, staging a "respectable duel" with Mel Queen to the eighth inning in a 12–7 Phillies victory; later in the month, he shut out the Reds on three hits to complete a series sweep by the Phillies. Thompson also defeated St. Louis late in the pennant race when the Cardinals were battling the Dodgers for the top position in the league.

== After the majors ==
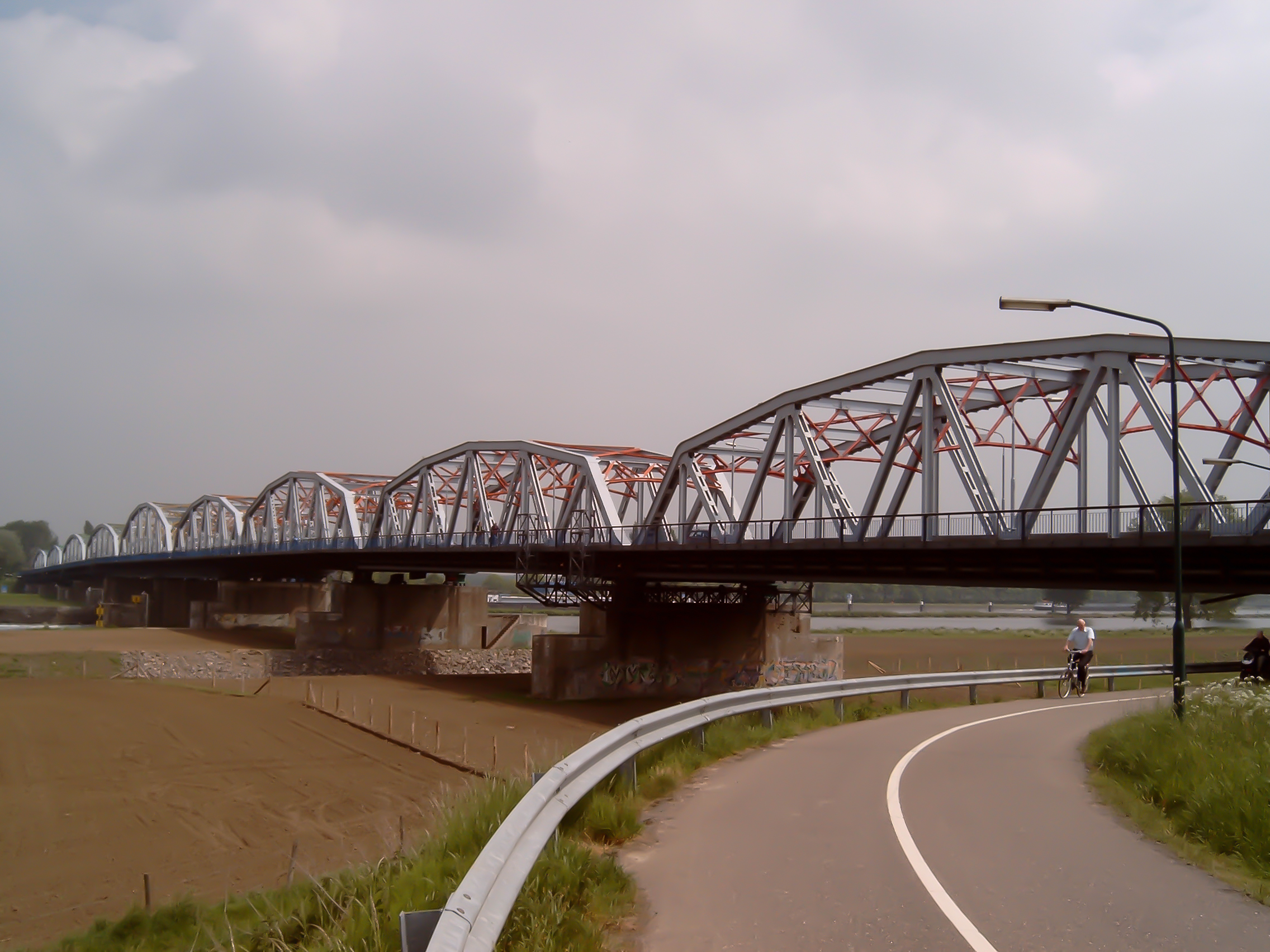
John S. Thompson Bridge over the Maas River in Grave, Netherlands

=== Minor leagues ===
Thompson returned to the minor leagues for the 1952 season, playing for the Baltimore Orioles, now affiliated with Philadelphia. He led the Orioles in innings pitched (231) and strikeouts (119) as he compiled a 13–14 record and a 2.49 ERA, third-best on the team. After the season, he played winter baseball in Havana, Cuba, pitching 14 1/3 innings in 5 games. Thompson's .714 winning percentage (ten wins and four losses) was best on the 1953 Orioles among pitchers who made 20 or more starts, and he pitched seven complete games. His 1953 ERA was 3.80, and he allowed 16 home runs in 154 innings. When the minor league Orioles moved to Richmond, Virginia, to make room for the transplanted St. Louis Browns of the American League, Thompson left the Phillies' system and remained with the old franchise, the unaffiliated Richmond Virginians, who began play in the 1954 season.

Thompson posted an 8–14 record for the Virginians in 1954; his ERA totaled 5.00 in 29 starts and he placed third on the team in innings pitched (198). His 112 strikeouts led Richmond, as did his 232 hits allowed. After a 6–16 season and a 5.17 ERA in 1955, Thompson retired from baseball.

=== Post-baseball ===
After his playing days ended, Thompson worked as a sales manager in Maryland. He died at age 71 on February 3, 1988, and was interred at the Gate of Heaven Cemetery in Silver Spring, Maryland. In 2004, the bridge over the Maas River which Thompson's platoon secured 60 years earlier was renamed the John S. Thompsonbrug ("John S. Thompson Bridge"). Many veterans of World War II, as well as Thompson's wife, attended the ceremony.
