= 1951 Pittsburgh Pirates season =

1951 Pittsburgh Pirates
- League: National League
- Ballpark: Forbes Field
- City: Pittsburgh, Pennsylvania
- Owners: John W. Galbreath (majority shareholder); Bing Crosby, Thomas P. Johnson, Branch Rickey (minority shareholders)
- General managers: Branch Rickey
- Managers: Billy Meyer
- Radio: WWSW; Rosey Rowswell, Bob Prince

The 1951 Pittsburgh Pirates season was the 70th season of the Pittsburgh Pirates franchise; the 65th in the National League. The Pirates finished seventh in the league standings with a record of 64–90.

== Offseason ==
- November 16, 1950: Catfish Metkovich was drafted by the Pirates from the Oakland Oaks in the 1950 rule 5 draft.

== Regular season ==
=== Season standings ===
National League
Team	W	L	Pct.	GB	Home	Road
New York Giants	98	59	.624	—	50‍–‍28	48‍–‍31
Brooklyn Dodgers	97	60	.618	1	49‍–‍29	48‍–‍31
St. Louis Cardinals	81	73	.526	15½	44‍–‍34	37‍–‍39
Boston Braves	76	78	.494	20½	42‍–‍35	34‍–‍43
Philadelphia Phillies	73	81	.474	23½	38‍–‍39	35‍–‍42
Cincinnati Reds	68	86	.442	28½	35‍–‍42	33‍–‍44
Pittsburgh Pirates	64	90	.416	32½	32‍–‍45	32‍–‍45
Chicago Cubs	62	92	.403	34½	32‍–‍45	30‍–‍47

=== Record vs. opponents ===
1951 National League record Sources:
Team	BSN	BRO	CHC	CIN	NYG	PHI	PIT	STL
Boston	—	10–12–1	10–12	10–12	8–14	12–10	13–9	13–9
Brooklyn	12–10–1	—	14–8	14–8	14–11	15–7	10–12	18–4
Chicago	12–10	8–14	—	10–12	7–15	7–15	9–13	9–13–1
Cincinnati	12–10	8–14	12–10	—	5–17	11–11	12–10–1	8–14
New York	14–8	11–14	15–7	17–5	—	16–6	14–8	11–11
Philadelphia	10–12	7–15	15–7	11–11	6–16	—	15–7	9–13
Pittsburgh	9–13	12–10	13–9	10–12–1	8–14	7–15	—	5–17
St. Louis	9–13	4–18	13–9–1	14–8	11–11	13–9	17–5	—

=== Game log ===
1951 Game Log: 64–90 (Home: 32–45; Away: 32–45)
April: 5–5 (Home: 2–2; Away: 3–3)

#	Date	Opponent	Score	Win	Loss	Save	Attendance	Record
1	April 16	@ Reds	4–3	**Chambers** (1–0)	Blackwell	**Werle** (1)	30,441	1–0
2	April 17	Cardinals	5–4	**Dickson** (1–0)	Poholsky	**Werle** (2)	25,894	2–0
3	April 21	@ Reds	3–8	Fox	**Chambers** (1–1)	—	4,180	2–1
4	April 22	@ Reds	7–5	**Werle** (1–0)	Blackwell	—	7,254	3–1
5	April 23	@ Cubs	1–2	Hiller	**Queen** (0–1)	—	7,899	3–2
6	April 24	@ Cubs	6–4	**Law** (1–0)	Lown	**Werle** (3)	7,750	4–2
7	April 25	@ Cardinals	0–4	Poholsky	**Chambers** (1–2)	—	9,628	4–3
8	April 27	Reds	5–7	Blackwell	**Muir** (0–1)	Fox	27,135	4–4
9	April 28	Reds	2–4	Wehmeier	**Dempsey** (0–1)	Smith	10,657	4–5
10	April 29	Reds	9–8 (13)	**Dickson** (2–0)	Smith	—		5–5
11	April 29	Reds	1–1 (10)			—	23,601	5–5

May: 10–18 (Home: 3–10; Away: 7–8)

#	Date	Opponent	Score	Win	Loss	Save	Attendance	Record
12	May 1	@ Dodgers	6–2	**Chambers** (2–2)	Palica	—	6,716	6–5
13	May 2	@ Dodgers	4–3	**Dickson** (3–0)	Newcombe	—	6,238	7–5
14	May 3	@ Giants	7–4 (10)	**Queen** (1–1)	Jones	**Werle** (4)	9,649	8–5
15	May 4	@ Giants	1–5	Maglie	**Dempsey** (0–2)	—	3,947	8–6
16	May 5	@ Giants	3–8	Bowman	**Koski** (0–1)	—	10,265	8–7
17	May 6	@ Braves	0–6	Spahn	**Dickson** (3–1)	—		8–8
18	May 6	@ Braves	3–0	**Chambers** (3–2)	Estock	—	15,492	9–8
19	May 8	@ Phillies	9–3	**Queen** (2–1)	Heintzelman	**Werle** (5)	13,700	10–8
20	May 9	@ Phillies	5–6 (10)	Konstanty	**Muir** (0–2)	—	14,134	10–9
21	May 10	@ Phillies	2–0	**Dickson** (4–1)	Church	—	3,562	11–9
22	May 11	Cubs	4–10	Rush	**Chambers** (3–3)	—	22,760	11–10
23	May 12	Cubs	4–8	Hiller	**Law** (1–1)	Minner	7,528	11–11
24	May 13	Cubs	2–1	**Queen** (3–1)	Schultz	—		12–11
25	May 13	Cubs	0–6	Klippstein	**Dickson** (4–2)	—	25,434	12–12
26	May 15	Giants	7–3	**Werle** (2–0)	Spencer	**Law** (1)	25,838	13–12
27	May 16	Giants	1–2	Hearn	**Walsh** (0–1)	—	24,103	13–13
28	May 17	Giants	12–7	**Dickson** (5–2)	Kennedy	—	13,926	14–13
29	May 18	Braves	3–12	Surkont	**Queen** (3–2)	—	30,890	14–14
30	May 19	Braves	2–6	Bickford	**Law** (1–2)	—	13,217	14–15
31	May 20	Phillies	0–17	Meyer	**Dickson** (5–3)	—		14–16
32	May 20	Phillies	4–12	Roberts	**Dusak** (0–1)	—	36,166	14–17
33	May 22	Dodgers	8–17	Erskine	**Friend** (0–1)	Branca	22,360	14–18
34	May 23	Dodgers	4–11	Newcombe	**Queen** (3–3)	—	15,759	14–19
35	May 25	@ Cubs	10–1	**Dickson** (6–3)	Hiller	—	8,143	15–19
36	May 26	@ Cubs	4–5 (10)	Schmitz	**Walsh** (0–2)	—	9,006	15–20
37	May 28	@ Cardinals	5–6 (10)	Poholsky	**LaPalme** (0–1)	—	9,757	15–21
38	May 30	@ Cardinals	3–4	Presko	**Dickson** (6–4)	Wilks		15–22
39	May 30	@ Cardinals	3–7	Munger	**Queen** (3–4)	—	26,952	15–23

June: 10–18 (Home: 4–9; Away: 6–9)

#	Date	Opponent	Score	Win	Loss	Save	Attendance	Record
40	June 1	@ Giants	2–8	Maglie	**Chambers** (3–4)	—	16,875	15–24
41	June 2	@ Giants	3–14	Hearn	**LaPalme** (0–2)	—	7,003	15–25
42	June 3	@ Phillies	2–11	Roberts	**Queen** (3–5)	—		15–26
43	June 3	@ Phillies	3–8	Church	**Dickson** (6–5)	—	19,325	15–27
44	June 4	@ Phillies	12–4	**Friend** (1–1)	Meyer	**Dickson** (1)	2,343	16–27
45	June 5	@ Braves	8–0	**LaPalme** (1–2)	Sain	—	4,302	17–27
46	June 6	@ Braves	2–5	Spahn	**Chambers** (3–5)	—	5,030	17–28
47	June 7	@ Braves	0–5	Bickford	**Queen** (3–6)	—	4,916	17–29
48	June 9	@ Dodgers	4–1	**Dickson** (7–5)	Newcombe	—	11,462	18–29
49	June 10	@ Dodgers	1–2	Branca	**Friend** (1–2)	—		18–30
50	June 10	@ Dodgers	5–4 (11)	**Werle** (3–0)	Erskine	—	24,602	19–30
51	June 12	Braves	3–13	Sain	**Chambers** (3–6)	—	16,054	19–31
52	June 14	Braves	9–4	**Dickson** (8–5)	Bickford	—	4,277	20–31
53	June 15	Giants	6–11	Hearn	**Friend** (1–3)	—	22,746	20–32
54	June 16	Giants	1–6	Maglie	**LaPalme** (1–3)	—	8,673	20–33
55	June 17	Giants	11–5	**Pollet** (1–0)	Bowman	**Werle** (6)		21–33
56	June 17	Giants	6–7 (10)	Jansen	**Dickson** (8–6)	—	25,090	21–34
57	June 19	Phillies	2–9	Meyer	**Dickson** (8–7)	—	16,601	21–35
58	June 20	Phillies	0–1	Church	**Friend** (1–4)	—	12,751	21–36
59	June 21	Phillies	5–10	Roberts	**LaPalme** (1–4)	—	5,682	21–37
60	June 22	Dodgers	4–8	King	**Wilks** (0–1)	—	24,966	21–38
61	June 23	Dodgers	1–13	Newcombe	**Werle** (3–1)	—	9,937	21–39
62	June 24	Dodgers	10–7	**Dickson** (9–7)	Erskine	—		22–39
63	June 24	Dodgers	5–4	**Wilks** (1–1)	King	—	31,435	23–39
64	June 26	@ Reds	3–2	**Pollet** (2–0)	Perkowski	—	8,313	24–39
65	June 27	@ Reds	1–2	Ramsdell	**Friend** (1–5)	—	5,788	24–40
66	June 28	@ Reds	7–5	**Werle** (4–1)	Raffensberger	**Wilks** (2)	7,568	25–40
67	June 30	@ Cardinals	4–8	Chambers	**Dickson** (9–8)	—	13,479	25–41

July: 14–16 (Home: 10–7; Away: 4–9)

#	Date	Opponent	Score	Win	Loss	Save	Attendance	Record
68	July 1	@ Cardinals	4–5 (12)	Staley	**Pollet** (2–1)	—	21,195	25–42
69	July 2	Cubs	7–2	**Dickson** (10–8)	Hiller	—	12,661	26–42
70	July 3	Cubs	2–0	**Law** (2–2)	Rush	—	4,650	27–42
71	July 4	Reds	4–1	**Friend** (2–5)	Blackwell	**Wilks** (3)		28–42
72	July 4	Reds	16–4 (6)	**Werle** (5–1)	Ramsdell	—	16,061	29–42
73	July 5	Reds	0–4	Fox	**Pollet** (2–2)	—	2,212	29–43
74	July 6	Cardinals	2–3	Munger	**Dickson** (10–9)	—	24,532	29–44
75	July 7	Cardinals	5–1	**Law** (3–2)	Lanier	—	10,127	30–44
76	July 8	Cardinals	6–2	**Friend** (3–5)	Staley	**Wilks** (4)		31–44
77	July 8	Cardinals	8–9	Chambers	**Wilks** (1–2)	Staley	31,085	31–45
78	July 12	@ Phillies	6–11	Meyer	**Dickson** (10–10)	—	10,618	31–46
79	July 13	@ Phillies	2–3	Roberts	**Pollet** (2–3)	—	7,786	31–47
80	July 14	@ Phillies	0–2	Church	**Law** (3–3)	—	4,106	31–48
81	July 15	@ Giants	7–6 (12)	**Dickson** (11–10)	Koslo	—		32–48
82	July 15	@ Giants	3–8	Hearn	**Werle** (5–2)	—	17,945	32–49
83	July 16	@ Giants	6–7	Spencer	**Werle** (5–3)	—	3,390	32–50
84	July 17	@ Dodgers	4–3	**Pollet** (3–3)	Podbielan	**Wilks** (5)	18,097	33–50
85	July 18	@ Dodgers	13–12	**Walsh** (1–2)	Palica	**Wilks** (6)	7,083	34–50
86	July 20	@ Braves	6–11	Spahn	**Law** (3–4)	—	5,767	34–51
87	July 21	@ Braves	6–11	Bickford	**Law** (3–5)	—	3,263	34–52
88	July 22	@ Braves	3–5	Chipman	**Wilks** (1–3)	—		34–53
89	July 22	@ Braves	5–2	**Dickson** (12–10)	Wilson	—	8,514	35–53
90	July 23	Braves	14–15	Paine	**Law** (3–6)	Chipman	8,112	35–54
91	July 24	Giants	3–4 (10)	Maglie	**Friend** (3–6)	—	17,858	35–55
92	July 25	Giants	5–4	**Wilks** (2–3)	Spencer	—	8,718	36–55
93	July 27	Braves	8–4	**Pollet** (4–3)	Surkont	—	17,256	37–55
94	July 28	Braves	8–4	**Dickson** (13–10)	Spahn	—	6,848	38–55
95	July 29	Braves	6–2	**Friend** (4–6)	Sain	—		39–55
96	July 29	Braves	4–5	Wilson	**Queen** (3–7)	Estock	17,881	39–56
97	July 31	Dodgers	3–8	Newcombe	**Pollet** (4–4)	—	26,132	39–57

August: 16–17 (Home: 6–6; Away: 10–11)

#	Date	Opponent	Score	Win	Loss	Save	Attendance	Record
98	August 1	Dodgers	12–9	**Werle** (6–3)	King	**Wilks** (7)	19,502	40–57
99	August 2	Dodgers	5–10	Erskine	**Friend** (4–7)	—	10,986	40–58
100	August 3	Phillies	4–5	Roberts	**Law** (3–7)	—	13,607	40–59
101	August 4	Phillies	7–3	**Dickson** (14–10)	Johnson	—	7,206	41–59
102	August 5	Phillies	1–5	Church	**Friend** (4–8)	—		41–60
103	August 5	Phillies	7–12	Heintzelman	**Wilks** (2–4)	Konstanty	20,049	41–61
104	August 7	@ Cardinals	7–16	Boyer	**LaPalme** (1–5)	Brazle	7,465	41–62
105	August 8	@ Cardinals	10–7	**Dickson** (15–10)	Poholsky	**Wilks** (8)	7,482	42–62
106	August 9	@ Cardinals	0–4	Chambers	**Pollet** (4–5)	—	6,855	42–63
107	August 10	@ Cubs	3–0	**Queen** (4–7)	McLish	—	7,703	43–63
108	August 11	@ Cubs	3–4	Kelly	**Law** (3–8)	—		43–64
109	August 11	@ Cubs	2–1	**Friend** (5–8)	Rush	—	20,522	44–64
110	August 12	@ Cubs	1–0	**Dickson** (16–10)	Hatten	—		45–64
111	August 12	@ Cubs	0–6	Minner	**Werle** (6–4)	—	25,891	45–65
112	August 13	@ Reds	0–2	Fox	**Pollet** (4–6)	—		45–66
113	August 13	@ Reds	1–7	Blackwell	**Walsh** (1–3)	—	9,992	45–67
114	August 15	Cardinals	7–0	**Friend** (6–8)	Staley	—	17,853	46–67
115	August 16	Cardinals	6–9	Staley	**Dickson** (16–11)	—	6,619	46–68
116	August 17	Cubs	8–3	**Queen** (5–7)	Minner	—	10,007	47–68
117	August 18	Cubs	5–11	Kelly	**Pollet** (4–7)	Leonard	6,212	47–69
118	August 19	Cubs	4–2	**Carlsen** (1–0)	Hatten	—		48–69
119	August 19	Cubs	5–4	**Law** (4–8)	Leonard	—	16,434	49–69
120	August 21	@ Braves	1–3	Wilson	**Friend** (6–9)	—	3,289	49–70
121	August 22	@ Braves	4–5 (10)	Chipman	**Werle** (6–5)	—	4,585	49–71
122	August 24	@ Phillies	5–1	**Dickson** (17–11)	Thompson	—	8,847	50–71
123	August 25	@ Phillies	3–2 (12)	**Carlsen** (2–0)	Konstanty	—	5,276	51–71
124	August 26	@ Dodgers	12–11	**Law** (5–8)	King	**Dickson** (2)		52–71
125	August 26	@ Dodgers	3–4 (10)	Roe	**Wilks** (2–5)	—	30,189	52–72
126	August 27	@ Dodgers	0–5	Branca	**Queen** (5–8)	—		52–73
127	August 27	@ Dodgers	5–2	**Werle** (7–5)	Palica	**Law** (2)	32,561	53–73
128	August 28	@ Giants	2–0	**Pollet** (5–7)	Jones	—	8,803	54–73
129	August 29	@ Giants	1–3	Hearn	**Dickson** (17–12)	—	7,678	54–74
130	August 30	@ Giants	10–9	**Dickson** (18–12)	Jansen	—	8,230	55–74

September: 9–16 (Home: 7–11; Away: 2–5)

#	Date	Opponent	Score	Win	Loss	Save	Attendance	Record
131	September 1	@ Cardinals	2–6	Chambers	**Carlsen** (2–1)	—	11,637	55–75
132	September 2	@ Cardinals	1–6	Poholsky	**Pollet** (5–8)	—	12,852	55–76
133	September 3	@ Cubs	10–11 (12)	Dubiel	**Law** (5–9)	—		55–77
134	September 3	@ Cubs	4–3 (7)	**Wilks** (3–5)	Lown	—	20,242	56–77
135	September 5	Reds	3–6	Wehmeier	**Werle** (7–6)	Raffensberger	9,086	56–78
136	September 6	Reds	7–4	**Pollet** (6–8)	Fox	**Wilks** (9)	4,222	57–78
137	September 7	Cardinals	4–11	Bokelmann	**Carlsen** (2–2)	—	7,371	57–79
138	September 8	Cardinals	2–4	Brazle	**Queen** (5–9)	—	5,511	57–80
139	September 9	Cardinals	1–2 (10)	Lanier	**Dickson** (18–13)	—		57–81
140	September 9	Cardinals	4–7	Bokelmann	**Walsh** (1–4)	—	17,456	57–82
141	September 11	Phillies	2–3	Roberts	**Carlsen** (2–3)	—	8,152	57–83
142	September 12	Phillies	8–6	**Law** (6–9)	Hansen	**Wilks** (10)	2,364	58–83
143	September 14	Dodgers	1–3	Roe	**Dickson** (18–14)	—	18,050	58–84
144	September 15	Dodgers	11–4	**Queen** (6–9)	Branca	**Wilks** (11)	11,098	59–84
145	September 16	Giants	1–7	Jansen	**Pollet** (6–9)	—		59–85
146	September 16	Giants	4–6	Maglie	**Dickson** (18–15)	—	24,990	59–86
147	September 18	Braves	6–5	**Yochim** (1–0)	Wilson	**Wilks** (12)	8,036	60–86
148	September 19	Braves	7–3	**Dickson** (19–15)	Nichols	—	2,793	61–86
149	September 22	@ Reds	0–9	Wehmeier	**Friend** (6–10)	—	1,093	61–87
150	September 23	@ Reds	3–0	**Dickson** (20–15)	Blackwell	—		62–87
151	September 23	@ Reds	0–2	Fox	**Pollet** (6–10)	—	6,152	62–88
152	September 25	Cubs	6–3	**Queen** (7–9)	Lown	**Wilks** (13)	6,063	63–88
153	September 28	Reds	3–4	Wehmeier	**Yochim** (1–1)	—	4,250	63–89
154	September 29	Reds	2–4	Blackwell	**Dickson** (20–16)	Smith	13,843	63–90
155	September 30	Reds	8–4 (11)	**Werle** (8–6)	Smith	—	9,068	64–90

Legend: = Win = Loss = Tie
Bold = Pirates team member

=== Notable transactions ===
- June 15, 1951: Cliff Chambers and Wally Westlake were traded by the Pirates to the St. Louis Cardinals for Joe Garagiola, Dick Cole, Bill Howerton, Howie Pollet, and Ted Wilks.

=== Roster ===
1951 Pittsburgh Pirates
**Roster**
**Pitchers**: 24 Don Carlsen; 23 Cliff Chambers; 30 Con Dempsey; 21,22 Murry Dickson; 25 Bob Friend; 26 Bill Koski; 24 Paul LaPalme; 20 Vern Law; 31 Joe Muir; 23 Paul Pettit; 30 Howie Pollet; 36 Mel Queen; 29 Junior Walsh; 19 Bill Werle; 28 Ted Wilks; 23 Len Yochim	**Catchers**: 9 Ed Fitz Gerald; 2 Joe Garagiola; 3,8 Clyde McCullough; **Infielders**: 10,12 Monty Basgall; 16 Pete Castiglione; 12 Dick Cole; 3 Bob Dillinger; 2 Dale Long; 12 Jack Maguire; 10 Jack Merson; 7 Danny Murtaugh; 6 Rocky Nelson; 5 Jack Phillips; 6 Stan Rojek; 10 Hank Schenz; 6 Dick Smith; 14 George Strickland; 15 Wally Westlake	**Outfielders**: 13 Ted Beard; 18 Gus Bell; 15 Erv Dusak; 8 Bill Howerton; 4 Ralph Kiner; 11 Catfish Metkovich; 27 Pete Reiser; 21 Dino Restelli; 17 Tom Saffell; 27 Frank Thomas; **Other batters**: 35,39 Harry Fisher	**Manager**: 1 Billy Meyer; **Coaches**: 41 Babe Herman (Hitting/First Base); 43 Sam Narron (Bullpen); 42 Bill Posedel (Pitching); 40 Milt Stock (Third Base); 33 Honus Wagner

== Player stats ==
=== Batting ===
==== Starters by position ====
Note: Pos = Position; G = Games played; AB = At bats; H = Hits; Avg. = Batting average; HR = Home runs; RBI = Runs batted in

Pos	Player	G	AB	H	Avg.	HR	RBI
C	Clyde McCullough	92	259	77	.297	8	39
1B	Jack Phillips	70	156	37	.237	0	12
2B	Monty Basgall	55	153	32	.209	0	9
SS	George Strickland	138	454	98	.216	9	47
3B	Pete Castiglione	132	482	126	.261	7	42
OF	Catfish Metkovich	120	423	124	.293	3	40
OF	Gus Bell	149	600	167	.278	16	89
OF	Ralph Kiner	151	531	164	.309	42	109

==== Other batters ====
Note: G = Games played; AB = At bats; H = Hits; Avg. = Batting average; HR = Home runs; RBI = Runs batted in

Player	G	AB	H	Avg.	HR	RBI
Bill Howerton	80	219	60	.274	11	37
Joe Garagiola	72	212	54	.255	9	35
Rocky Nelson	71	195	52	.267	1	14
Wally Westlake	50	181	51	.282	16	45
Danny Murtaugh	77	151	30	.199	1	11
Frank Thomas	39	148	39	.264	2	16
Pete Reiser	74	140	38	.271	2	13
Dick Cole	42	106	25	.236	1	11
Ed Fitz Gerald	55	97	22	.227	0	13
Tom Saffell	49	65	13	.200	1	5
Hank Schenz	25	61	13	.213	0	3
Jack Merson	13	50	18	.360	1	14
Ted Beard	22	48	9	.188	1	3
Dick Smith	12	46	8	.174	0	4
Bob Dillinger	12	43	10	.233	0	0
Erv Dusak	21	39	12	.308	1	7
Dino Restelli	21	38	7	.184	1	3
Stan Rojek	8	16	3	.188	0	0
Dale Long	10	12	2	.167	1	1
Jack Maguire	8	5	0	.000	0	0
Harry Fisher	3	3	0	.000	0	0

=== Pitching ===
==== Starting pitchers ====
Note: G = Games pitched; IP = Innings pitched; W = Wins; L = Losses; ERA = Earned run average; SO = Strikeouts

Player	G	IP	W	L	ERA	SO
Murry Dickson	45	288.2	20	16	4.02	112
Howie Pollet	21	128.2	6	10	5.04	47
Cliff Chambers	10	59.2	3	6	5.58	19
Don Carlsen	7	43.2	2	3	4.19	20
Len Yochim	2	8.2	1	1	8.31	5

==== Other pitchers ====
Note: G = Games pitched; IP = Innings pitched; W = Wins; L = Losses; ERA = Earned run average; SO = Strikeouts

Player	G	IP	W	L	ERA	SO
Mel Queen	39	168.1	7	9	4.44	123
Bob Friend	34	149.2	6	10	4.27	41
Vern Law	28	114.0	6	9	4.50	41
Paul LaPalme	22	54.1	1	5	6.29	24
Con Dempsey	3	7.0	0	2	9.00	3
Erv Dusak	3	6.2	0	1	12.15	2

==== Relief pitchers ====
Note: G = Games pitched; W = Wins; L = Losses; SV = Saves; ERA = Earned run average; SO = Strikeouts

Player	G	W	L	SV	ERA	SO
Ted Wilks	48	3	5	12	2.83	43
Bill Werle	59	8	6	6	5.65	57
Junior Walsh	36	1	4	0	6.87	32
Bill Koski	13	0	1	0	6.67	6
Joe Muir	9	0	2	0	2.76	5
Paul Pettit	2	0	0	0	3.38	0

== Farm system ==
Level	Team	League	Manager
AAA	Indianapolis Indians	American Association	Don Gutteridge
AAA	Hollywood Stars	Pacific Coast League	Fred Haney
AA	New Orleans Pelicans	Southern Association	Rip Sewell
A	Charleston Rebels	Sally League	Frank Oceak
B	Waco Pirates	Big State League	Walt Tauscher
B	Burlington Bees	Carolina League	Frank Barrett and Mike Kash
C	Modesto Reds	California League	Tony Freitas
C	Butler Tigers	Middle Atlantic League	Norm Gerdeman, William Allen and Frank Barrett
C	Hutchinson Elks	Western Association	Wes Griffin
D	Eugene Larks	Far West League	Duster Mails, George Matile and Cliff Dapper
D	Brunswick Pirates	Georgia–Florida League	Mickey O'Neil
D	Bartlesville Pirates	Kansas–Oklahoma–Missouri League	Tedd Gullic
D	Mayfield Clothiers	KITTY League	Jerry Gardner
D	Salisbury Pirates	North Carolina State League	George Detore
