= 1951 Boston Braves season =

Major League Baseball season

1951 Boston Braves
- League: National League
- Ballpark: Braves Field
- City: Boston, Massachusetts
- Record: 76–78 (.494)
- League place: 4th
- Owners: Louis R. Perini
- General managers: John J. Quinn
- Managers: Billy Southworth, Tommy Holmes
- Television: WNAC; WBZ-TV
- Radio: WNAC (Jim Britt, Bump Hadley, Les Smith)

The 1951 Boston Braves season was the 81st season of the franchise and its penultimate in Boston.

== Offseason ==
- Prior to 1951 season: Georges Maranda was signed as an amateur free agent by the Braves.

== Regular season ==
=== Season standings ===
National League
Team	W	L	Pct.	GB	Home	Road
New York Giants	98	59	.624	—	50‍–‍28	48‍–‍31
Brooklyn Dodgers	97	60	.618	1	49‍–‍29	48‍–‍31
St. Louis Cardinals	81	73	.526	15½	44‍–‍34	37‍–‍39
Boston Braves	76	78	.494	20½	42‍–‍35	34‍–‍43
Philadelphia Phillies	73	81	.474	23½	38‍–‍39	35‍–‍42
Cincinnati Reds	68	86	.442	28½	35‍–‍42	33‍–‍44
Pittsburgh Pirates	64	90	.416	32½	32‍–‍45	32‍–‍45
Chicago Cubs	62	92	.403	34½	32‍–‍45	30‍–‍47

=== Record vs. opponents ===
1951 National League record Sources:
Team	BSN	BRO	CHC	CIN	NYG	PHI	PIT	STL
Boston	—	10–12–1	10–12	10–12	8–14	12–10	13–9	13–9
Brooklyn	12–10–1	—	14–8	14–8	14–11	15–7	10–12	18–4
Chicago	12–10	8–14	—	10–12	7–15	7–15	9–13	9–13–1
Cincinnati	12–10	8–14	12–10	—	5–17	11–11	12–10–1	8–14
New York	14–8	11–14	15–7	17–5	—	16–6	14–8	11–11
Philadelphia	10–12	7–15	15–7	11–11	6–16	—	15–7	9–13
Pittsburgh	9–13	12–10	13–9	10–12–1	8–14	7–15	—	5–17
St. Louis	9–13	4–18	13–9–1	14–8	11–11	13–9	17–5	—

=== Roster ===
1951 Boston Braves
Roster
Pitchers: 24 Vern Bickford; 33 Lew Burdette; 14,44 Bob Chipman; 16,26 Dave Cole; 11 Blix Donnelly; 20 Dick Donovan; 22 George Estock; 37 Bobby Hogue; 17 Chet Nichols Jr.; 11 Phil Paine; 33 Johnny Sain; 11 Sid Schacht; 21 Warren Spahn; 36 Max Surkont; 19 Jim Wilson	Catchers: 39 Walker Cooper; 1,8 Ray Mueller; 7 Ebba St. Claire; Infielders: 3 Bob Elliott; 12 Roy Hartsfield; 10 Buddy Kerr; 23 Johnny Logan; 2 Gene Mauch; 13 Sibby Sisti; 9 Earl Torgeson	Outfielders: 6 Bob Addis; 4 Sid Gordon; 1 Tommy Holmes; 5 Sam Jethroe; 18 Luis Márquez; 27 Willard Marshall; 15 Luis Olmo; Other batters: 8 Bob Thorpe	Manager: 1 Tommy Holmes; 30 Billy Southworth; Coaches: 29 Jimmy Brown; 28 Johnny Cooney; 35 Bob Keely; 31 Bucky Walters

== Player stats ==
= Indicates team leader

=== Batting ===
==== Starters by position ====
Note: Pos = Position; G = Games played; AB = At bats; H = Hits; Avg. = Batting average; HR = Home runs; RBI = Runs batted in

Pos	Player	G	AB	H	Avg.	HR	RBI
C	Walker Cooper	109	342	107	.313	18	59
1B	Earl Torgeson	155	581	153	.263	24	92
2B	Roy Hartsfield	120	450	122	.271	6	31
SS	Buddy Kerr	69	172	32	.186	1	18
3B	Bob Elliott	136	480	137	.285	15	70
OF	Sid Gordon	150	550	158	.287	29	109
OF	Willard Marshall	136	469	132	.281	11	62
OF	Sam Jethroe	148	572	160	.280	18	65

==== Other batters ====
Note: G = Games played; AB = At bats; H = Hits; Avg. = Batting average; HR = Home runs; RBI = Runs batted in

Player	G	AB	H	Avg.	HR	RBI
Sibby Sisti	114	362	101	.279	2	38
Ebba St. Claire	72	220	62	.282	1	25
Bob Addis	85	199	55	.276	1	24
Johnny Logan	62	169	37	.219	0	16
Luis Márquez	68	122	24	.197	0	11
Ray Mueller	28	70	11	.157	1	9
Luis Olmo	21	56	11	.196	0	4
Tommy Holmes	27	29	5	.172	0	5
Gene Mauch	19	20	2	.100	0	1
Bob Thorpe	2	2	1	.500	0	1

=== Pitching ===
= Indicates league leader

==== Starting pitchers ====
Note: G = Games pitched; IP = Innings pitched; W = Wins; L = Losses; ERA = Earned run average; SO = Strikeouts

Player	G	IP	W	L	ERA	SO
Warren Spahn	39	310.2	22	14	2.98	164*
Max Surkont	37	237.0	12	16	3.99	110
Vern Bickford	25	164.2	11	9	3.12	76
Johnny Sain	26	160.1	5	13	4.21	63
Jim Wilson	20	110.0	7	7	5.40	33

- Tied with Don Newcombe (Brooklyn) for league lead

==== Other pitchers ====
Note: G = Games pitched; IP = Innings pitched; W = Wins; L = Losses; ERA = Earned run average; SO = Strikeouts

Player	G	IP	W	L	ERA	SO
Chet Nichols Jr.	33	156.0	11	8	2.88	71
Dave Cole	23	67.2	2	4	4.26	33
Dick Donovan	8	13.2	0	0	5.27	4

==== Relief pitchers ====
Note: G = Games pitched; W = Wins; L = Losses; SV = Saves; ERA = Earned run average; SO = Strikeouts

Player	G	W	L	SV	ERA	SO
George Estock	37	0	1	3	4.33	11
Bob Chipman	33	4	3	4	4.85	17
Phil Paine	21	2	0	0	3.06	17
Blix Donnelly	6	0	1	0	7.36	3
Sid Schacht	5	0	2	0	1.93	1
Bobby Hogue	3	0	0	0	5.40	0
Lew Burdette	3	0	0	0	6.23	1

== Awards and honors ==
All-Star Game

- Warren Spahn, Pitcher, Reserve

== Farm system ==
Level	Team	League	Manager
AAA	Milwaukee Brewers	American Association	Charlie Grimm
AA	Atlanta Crackers	Southern Association	Dixie Walker and Whit Wyatt
A	Hartford Chiefs	Eastern League	Tommy Holmes and Travis Jackson
A	Denver Bears	Western League	Andy Cohen
B	Evansville Braves	Illinois–Indiana–Iowa League	Bob Coleman
B	Hagerstown Braves	Interstate League	Dutch Dorman
C	Ventura Braves	California League	Gene Lillard
C	Eau Claire Bears	Northern League	Bill Adair
C	Quebec Braves	Provincial League	George McQuinn
D	Bluefield Blue-Grays	Appalachian League	Travis Jackson and Xavier Rescigno

LEAGUE CHAMPIONS: Milwaukee
