= 1951 Chicago Cubs season =

1951 Chicago Cubs
- League: National League
- Ballpark: Wrigley Field
- City: Chicago
- Record: 62–92 (.403)
- League place: 8th
- Owners: Philip K. Wrigley
- General managers: Wid Matthews
- Managers: Frankie Frisch, Phil Cavarretta
- Television: WGN-TV (Jack Brickhouse, Harry Creighton, Marty Hogan); WBKB (Joe Wilson)
- Radio: WIND (Bert Wilson, Bud Campbell)

The 1951 Chicago Cubs season was the 80th season of the Chicago Cubs franchise, the 76th in the National League and the 36th at Wrigley Field. The Cubs finished eighth and last in the National League with a record of 62–92.

== Offseason ==
- October 10, 1950: Hank Edwards and cash were traded by the Cubs to the Brooklyn Dodgers for Dee Fondy and Chuck Connors.

== Regular season ==
=== Season standings ===
National League
Team	W	L	Pct.	GB	Home	Road
New York Giants	98	59	.624	—	50‍–‍28	48‍–‍31
Brooklyn Dodgers	97	60	.618	1	49‍–‍29	48‍–‍31
St. Louis Cardinals	81	73	.526	15½	44‍–‍34	37‍–‍39
Boston Braves	76	78	.494	20½	42‍–‍35	34‍–‍43
Philadelphia Phillies	73	81	.474	23½	38‍–‍39	35‍–‍42
Cincinnati Reds	68	86	.442	28½	35‍–‍42	33‍–‍44
Pittsburgh Pirates	64	90	.416	32½	32‍–‍45	32‍–‍45
Chicago Cubs	62	92	.403	34½	32‍–‍45	30‍–‍47

=== Record vs. opponents ===
1951 National League record Sources:
Team	BSN	BRO	CHC	CIN	NYG	PHI	PIT	STL
Boston	—	10–12–1	10–12	10–12	8–14	12–10	13–9	13–9
Brooklyn	12–10–1	—	14–8	14–8	14–11	15–7	10–12	18–4
Chicago	12–10	8–14	—	10–12	7–15	7–15	9–13	9–13–1
Cincinnati	12–10	8–14	12–10	—	5–17	11–11	12–10–1	8–14
New York	14–8	11–14	15–7	17–5	—	16–6	14–8	11–11
Philadelphia	10–12	7–15	15–7	11–11	6–16	—	15–7	9–13
Pittsburgh	9–13	12–10	13–9	10–12–1	8–14	7–15	—	5–17
St. Louis	9–13	4–18	13–9–1	14–8	11–11	13–9	17–5	—

=== Notable transactions ===
- June 15, 1951: Johnny Schmitz, Rube Walker, Andy Pafko, and Wayne Terwilliger were traded by the Cubs to the Brooklyn Dodgers for Eddie Miksis, Bruce Edwards, Joe Hatten, and Gene Hermanski.

=== Roster ===
1951 Chicago Cubs
Roster
Pitchers: 26 Monk Dubiel; 18 Warren Hacker; 53 Joe Hatten; 30 Frank Hiller; 18,33 Bob Kelly; 36 Johnny Klippstein; 20 Dutch Leonard; 35 Turk Lown; 27 Cal McLish; 24 Paul Minner; 17 Bob Rush; 53 Johnny Schmitz; 32 Bob Schultz; 23 Andy Varga	Catchers: 11 Smoky Burgess; 32 Harry Chiti; 8 Bruce Edwards; 12 Mickey Owen; 8 Rube Walker; Infielders: 44 Phil Cavarretta; 40 Chuck Connors; 37 Jack Cusick; 40 Dee Fondy; 2 Randy Jackson; 21 Eddie Miksis; 5 Bob Ramazzotti; 6 Fred Richards; 6 Bill Serena; 39 Roy Smalley Jr.; 21 Wayne Terwilliger	Outfielders: 7 Frank Baumholtz; 22 Bob Borkowski; 48 Gene Hermanski; 4 Hal Jeffcoat; 41 Carmen Mauro; 48 Andy Pafko; 9 Hank Sauer	Manager: 3 Frankie Frisch; 44 Phil Cavarretta; Coaches: 47 Spud Davis; 42 Roy Johnson; 49 Charlie Root

== Player stats ==
=== Batting ===
==== Starters by position ====
Note: Pos = Position; G = Games played; AB = At bats; H = Hits; Avg. = Batting average; HR = Home runs; RBI = Runs batted in

Pos	Player	G	AB	H	Avg.	HR	RBI
C	Smoky Burgess	94	219	55	.251	2	20
1B	Chuck Connors	66	201	48	.239	2	18
2B	Eddie Miksis	102	421	112	.266	4	35
SS	Roy Smalley Jr.	79	238	55	.231	8	31
3B	Randy Jackson	145	557	153	.275	16	76
OF	Hal Jeffcoat	113	278	76	.273	4	27
OF	Frank Baumholtz	146	560	159	.284	2	50
OF	Hank Sauer	141	525	138	.263	30	89

==== Other batters ====
Note: G = Games played; AB = At bats; H = Hits; Avg. = Batting average; HR = Home runs; RBI = Runs batted in

Player	G	AB	H	Avg.	HR	RBI
Gene Hermanski	75	231	65	.281	3	20
Phil Cavarretta	89	206	64	.311	6	28
Wayne Terwilliger	50	192	41	.214	0	10
Andy Pafko	49	178	47	.264	12	35
Dee Fondy	49	170	46	.271	3	20
Jack Cusick	65	164	29	.177	2	16
Bob Ramazzotti	73	158	39	.247	1	15
Bruce Edwards	51	141	33	.234	3	17
Mickey Owen	58	125	23	.184	0	15
Rube Walker	37	107	25	.234	2	5
Bob Borkowski	58	89	14	.157	0	10
Bill Serena	13	39	13	.333	1	4
Harry Chiti	9	31	11	.355	0	5
Carmen Mauro	13	29	5	.172	0	3
Fred Richards	10	27	8	.296	0	4

=== Pitching ===
==== Starting pitchers ====
Note: G = Games pitched; IP = Innings pitched; W = Wins; L = Losses; ERA = Earned run average; SO = Strikeouts

Player	G	IP	W	L	ERA	SO
Bob Rush	37	211.1	11	12	3.83	129
Paul Minner	33	201.2	6	17	3.79	68
Frank Hiller	24	141.1	6	12	4.84	50

==== Other pitchers ====
Note: G = Games pitched; IP = Innings pitched; W = Wins; L = Losses; ERA = Earned run average; SO = Strikeouts

Player	G	IP	W	L	ERA	SO
Cal McLish	30	145.2	4	10	4.45	46
Turk Lown	31	127.0	4	9	5.46	39
Bob Kelly	35	123.2	7	4	4.66	48
Johnny Klippstein	35	123.2	6	6	4.29	56
Bob Schultz	17	77.1	3	6	5.24	27
Joe Hatten	23	75.1	2	6	5.14	23
Johnny Schmitz	8	18.0	1	2	8.00	6

==== Relief pitchers ====
Note: G = Games pitched; W = Wins; L = Losses; SV = Saves; ERA = Earned run average; SO = Strikeouts

Player	G	W	L	SV	ERA	SO
Dutch Leonard	41	10	6	3	2.64	30
Monk Dubiel	22	2	2	1	2.30	19
Andy Varga	2	0	0	0	3.00	1
Warren Hacker	2	0	0	0	13.50	2

== Farm system ==
Level	Team	League	Manager
AAA	Springfield Cubs	International League	Bill Kelly
AAA	Los Angeles Angels	Pacific Coast League	Stan Hack
AA	Nashville Vols	Southern Association	Don Osborn
A	Grand Rapids Jets	Central League	Jack Knight and Everett Robinson
A	Des Moines Bruins	Western League	Al Todd
B	Greensboro Patriots	Carolina League	Bob Peterson
B	Rock Hill Chiefs	Tri-State League	Dick Bouknight
C	Visalia Cubs	California League	Jim Trew and Cecil Garriott
C	Sioux Falls Canaries	Northern League	Lee Eilbracht and Dick Lloyd
C	Topeka Owls	Western Association	Butch Nieman
C	Clovis Pioneers	West Texas–New Mexico League	Chuck Bushong and Grover Seitz
D	Carthage Cubs	Kansas–Oklahoma–Missouri League	Donald Anderson and Al Reitz
D	Rutherford County Owls	Western Carolina League	Halley Wilson
D	Janesville Cubs	Wisconsin State League	Adolph Matulis

LEAGUE CHAMPIONS: Topeka, Carthage
