= Eddie Sawyer =

American baseball manager

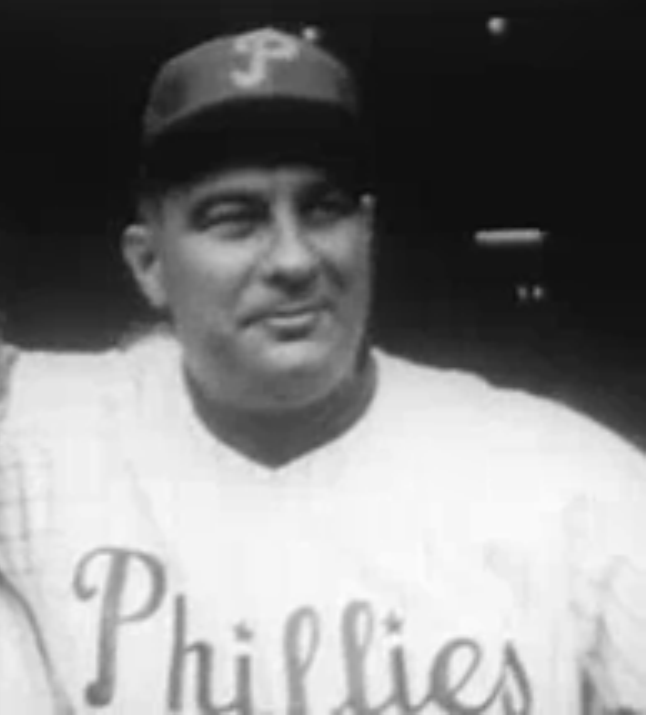
- Sawyer prior to the start of the 1950 World Series
- Manager
- Born: September 10, 1910; Westerly, Rhode Island, U.S.
- Died: September 22, 1997 (aged 87); Phoenixville, Pennsylvania, U.S.
- Batted: Right Threw: Right

MLB statistics
- Games managed: 817
- Managerial record: 390–423–4
- Winning percentage: .480
- Stats at Baseball Reference
- Managerial record at Baseball Reference

Teams
- Philadelphia Phillies (1948–1952, 1958–1960)

Edwin Milby Sawyer (September 10, 1910 – September 22, 1997) was an American manager and scout in Major League Baseball. As a manager, he led the 1950 Philadelphia Phillies — the "Whiz Kids", as the youthful club was known — to the second National League championship in team history.

== A scholar-athlete ==
Born in Westerly, Rhode Island, Sawyer was a minor league outfielder in his playing days who batted and threw right-handed; he was listed as 6 feet (1.8 m) tall and 210 pounds (95 kg). A rarity among baseball people of his era, Sawyer held an advanced degree from an Ivy League university: a master's degree in biology and physiology from Cornell. He had earned an undergraduate degree from Ithaca College, where he was a member of Phi Beta Kappa and later taught biology in the off-season.

Sawyer signed a contract to play in the New York Yankees' deep farm system in 1934. He reached the highest minor-league level in 1937 with the Oakland Oaks of the Pacific Coast League, but soon turned to managing in the Bronx Bombers' system. In 1939, his first year as a player-manager with the Amsterdam Rugmakers in the Class C Canadian–American League, Sawyer led the Rugmakers to a first-place finish and batted .369 with 103 runs batted in.

== Manager of the 'Whiz Kids' ==
In 1944, Sawyer left the Yankees to join the Phillies' organization. He managed the Utica Blue Sox of the Class A Eastern League from 1944 to 1947 and was in his first season with the Phils' top farm club, the Toronto Maple Leafs of the Triple-A International League, when he was promoted to replace Ben Chapman as the Phillies' manager on July 26, 1948.

Concurrently, the Phillies were being transfused with young blood, bringing to the majors many of the players who would become the Whiz Kids: Robin Roberts, Richie Ashburn, Del Ennis, Granny Hamner, Willie Jones, Curt Simmons, Bubba Church and others. He intermixed the youngsters with veteran players such as Jim Konstanty, Dick Sisler, Andy Seminick and Eddie Waitkus.

In 1949, the Phillies enjoyed their first winning season since 1932, winning 81 games and finishing third. Following the final game of the season Sawyer told his team: “We are going to win it all in 1950. Come back next year ready to win.” On opening day 1950, the Phillies debuted the red pinstripe uniform the team still wears today. Sawyer had designed it after concluding that “the old uniforms were terrible looking.” The NL pennant was up for grabs that season. The 1949 champion Brooklyn Dodgers suffered from pitching troubles and the outbreak of the Korean War had disrupted Major League rosters. The Phillies charged into the league lead and, despite a late-September tailspin, partially caused by the loss of Simmons to military service, they held off Brooklyn in the season's final game as Sisler's tenth-inning home run sealed a 4–1 victory. With 91 victories against 63 losses, the Phillies had won their first pennant since 1915. However, in the 1950 World Series they were no match for the Yankees, who swept them in four low-scoring games. After the season, Sawyer was named "manager of the year" in the Associated Press' poll of sports writers and sports broadcasters.

The 1950 season would be Sawyer's last winning season as a manager. The 1951 Phillies lost 18 games from their previous year's standard and fell to fifth. In 1952, with the team in sixth place and seven games below .500, Sawyer was replaced as skipper on June 27 by Steve O'Neill.

== An unsuccessful encore ==
He was out of baseball until the middle of the 1958 season. On July 22, with the team in seventh place, the Phillies fired Mayo Smith and brought Sawyer back to manage. The gamble fizzled, as the 1958 Phils dropped 40 of 70 games under Sawyer to finish last, and then placed last again in 1959. The second baseman on the 1959 Phillies roster was Sparky Anderson, in his only season in the Majors as a player before he went on to be a Hall of Fame skipper.

After managing the Phillies for the opening game of the 1960 season, a 9–4 loss to the Cincinnati Reds on April 12, Sawyer resigned his position, famously saying: "I'm 49 years old and I want to live to be 50." He was ultimately replaced by Gene Mauch. Sawyer would remain in the game as a scout, however, for the Phils and the Kansas City Royals.

His lifetime major league managerial record was 390–423 (.480). This unremarkable winning percentage may be deceptive. Richie Ashburn called Sawyer "the best manager I ever played for." Robin Roberts stated that “Eddie was a great manager to play for. I wish I could have played for him all 18 years.” Sawyer was elected a member of the Pennsylvania Sports and Ithaca College Sports halls of fame. He died at age 87 in Phoenixville, Pennsylvania.

== Managerial record ==
Team	Year	Regular season					Postseason			
Team	Year	Games	Won	Lost	Win %	Finish	Won	Lost	Win %	Result
PHI	1948	63	23	40	.365	6th in NL	–	–	–	–
PHI	1949	154	81	73	.526	3rd in NL	–	–	–	–
PHI	1950	157	91	63	.591	1st in NL	0	4	.000	Lost World Series (NYY)
PHI	1951	154	73	81	.474	5th in NL	–	–	–	–
PHI	1952	63	28	35	.444	(fired)	–	–	–	–
PHI	1958	70	30	40	.429	8th in NL	–	–	–	–
PHI	1959	155	64	90	.416	8th in NL	–	–	–	–
PHI	1960	1	0	1	.000	(resigned)	–	–	–	–
Total		817	390	423	.480		0	4	.000	
