= 1951 Cincinnati Reds season =

1951 Cincinnati Reds
- League: National League
- Ballpark: Crosley Field
- City: Cincinnati
- Owners: Powel Crosley Jr.
- General managers: Warren Giles
- Managers: Luke Sewell
- Television: WCPO-TV (Waite Hoyt)
- Radio: WCPO (Waite Hoyt)

The 1951 Cincinnati Reds season was a season in American baseball. The team finished sixth in the National League with a record of 68–86, 28 1/2 games behind the New York Giants.

== Offseason ==
- Prior to 1951 season: Bobby Durnbaugh was signed as an amateur free agent by the Reds.

== Regular season ==
=== Season standings ===
National League
Team	W	L	Pct.	GB	Home	Road
New York Giants	98	59	.624	—	50‍–‍28	48‍–‍31
Brooklyn Dodgers	97	60	.618	1	49‍–‍29	48‍–‍31
St. Louis Cardinals	81	73	.526	15½	44‍–‍34	37‍–‍39
Boston Braves	76	78	.494	20½	42‍–‍35	34‍–‍43
Philadelphia Phillies	73	81	.474	23½	38‍–‍39	35‍–‍42
Cincinnati Reds	68	86	.442	28½	35‍–‍42	33‍–‍44
Pittsburgh Pirates	64	90	.416	32½	32‍–‍45	32‍–‍45
Chicago Cubs	62	92	.403	34½	32‍–‍45	30‍–‍47

=== Record vs. opponents ===
1951 National League record Sources:
Team	BSN	BRO	CHC	CIN	NYG	PHI	PIT	STL
Boston	—	10–12–1	10–12	10–12	8–14	12–10	13–9	13–9
Brooklyn	12–10–1	—	14–8	14–8	14–11	15–7	10–12	18–4
Chicago	12–10	8–14	—	10–12	7–15	7–15	9–13	9–13–1
Cincinnati	12–10	8–14	12–10	—	5–17	11–11	12–10–1	8–14
New York	14–8	11–14	15–7	17–5	—	16–6	14–8	11–11
Philadelphia	10–12	7–15	15–7	11–11	6–16	—	15–7	9–13
Pittsburgh	9–13	12–10	13–9	10–12–1	8–14	7–15	—	5–17
St. Louis	9–13	4–18	13–9–1	14–8	11–11	13–9	17–5	—

=== Notable transactions ===
- June 1951: Bob Nieman was selected off waivers from the Reds by the Oklahoma City Indians.

=== Roster ===
1951 Cincinnati Reds
Roster
Pitchers: 33 Jim Blackburn; 47 Ewell Blackwell; 45 Ed Blake; 38 Bud Byerly; 34 Eddie Erautt; 43 Howie Fox; 35 Harry Perkowski; 30 Kent Peterson; 36 Ken Raffensberger; 40 Willie Ramsdell; 32 Frank Smith; 31 Herm Wehmeier	Catchers: 5 Dixie Howell; 8 Hobie Landrith; 9 Johnny Pramesa; 7 Bob Scheffing; Infielders: 12 Bobby Adams; 15 Grady Hatton; 18 Ted Kluszewski; 11 Roy McMillan; 14 Sammy Meeks; 16 Connie Ryan; 10 Virgil Stallcup	Outfielders: 21 Joe Adcock; 25 Hank Edwards; 52 Danny Litwhiler; 26 Barney McCosky; 20 Lloyd Merriman; 25 Wally Post; 24 Bob Usher; 22 Johnny Wyrostek; Other batters: 30 Jim Bolger; 26 Ted Tappe	Manager: 50 Luke Sewell; Coaches: 51 Tony Cuccinello; 52 Danny Litwhiler; 53 Phil Page

== Player stats ==
=== Batting ===
==== Starters by position ====
Note: Pos = Position; G = Games played; AB = At bats; H = Hits; Avg. = Batting average; HR = Home runs; RBI = Runs batted in

Pos	Player	G	AB	H	Avg.	HR	RBI
C	Dixie Howell	77	207	52	.251	2	18
1B	Ted Kluszewski	154	607	157	.259	13	77
2B	Connie Ryan	136	473	112	.237	16	53
SS	Virgil Stallcup	121	428	103	.241	8	49
3B	Grady Hatton	96	331	84	.254	4	37
OF	Joe Adcock	113	395	96	.243	10	47
OF	Johnny Wyrostek	142	537	167	.311	2	61
OF	Lloyd Merriman	114	359	87	.242	5	36

==== Other batters ====
Note: G = Games played; AB = At bats; H = Hits; Avg. = Batting average; HR = Home runs; RBI = Runs batted in

Player	G	AB	H	Avg.	HR	RBI
Bobby Adams	125	403	107	.266	5	24
Bob Usher	114	303	63	.208	5	25
Johnny Pramesa	72	227	52	.229	6	22
Roy McMillan	85	199	42	.211	1	8
Hank Edwards	41	127	40	.315	3	20
Bob Scheffing	47	122	31	.254	2	14
Barney McCosky	25	50	16	.320	1	11
Wally Post	15	41	9	.220	1	7
Sammy Meeks	23	35	8	.229	0	2
Danny Litwhiler	12	29	8	.276	2	3
Hobie Landrith	4	13	5	.385	0	0
Ted Tappe	4	3	1	.333	0	0
Jim Bolger	2	0	0	----	0	0

=== Pitching ===
==== Starting pitchers ====
Note: G = Games pitched; IP = Innings pitched; W = Wins; L = Losses; ERA = Earned run average; SO = Strikeouts

Player	G	IP	W	L	ERA	SO
Ken Raffensberger	42	248.2	16	17	3.44	81
Ewell Blackwell	38	232.2	16	15	3.44	120
Howie Fox	40	228.0	9	14	3.83	57
Willie Ramsdell	31	196.0	9	17	4.04	88

==== Other pitchers ====
Note: G = Games pitched; IP = Innings pitched; W = Wins; L = Losses; ERA = Earned run average; SO = Strikeouts

Player	G	IP	W	L	ERA	SO
Herm Wehmeier	39	184.2	7	10	3.70	93
Harry Perkowski	35	102.0	3	6	2.82	56

==== Relief pitchers ====
Note: G = Games pitched; W = Wins; L = Losses; SV = Saves; ERA = Earned run average; SO = Strikeouts

Player	G	W	L	SV	ERA	SO
Frank Smith	50	5	5	11	3.20	34
Bud Byerly	40	2	1	0	3.27	28
Eddie Erautt	30	0	0	0	5.72	20
Kent Peterson	9	1	1	0	6.52	5
Ed Blake	3	0	0	0	11.25	1
Jim Blackburn	2	0	0	0	17.18	1

== Farm system ==
Level	Team	League	Manager
AA	Tulsa Oilers	Texas League	Al Vincent
A	Charleston Senators	Central League	Ernie White
A	Columbia Reds	Sally League	Buddy Hancken
C	Ogden Reds	Pioneer League	Cecil Scheffel
D	Welch Miners	Appalachian League	Mike Blazo
