= Dick Young (baseball) =

American baseball player (1928–2018)

- Second baseman
- Born: June 3, 1928; Seattle, Washington, U.S.
- Died: January 7, 2018 (aged 89); Seattle, Washington, U.S.
- Batted: Left Threw: Right

MLB debut
- September 11, 1951, for the Philadelphia Phillies

Last MLB appearance
- September 28, 1952, for the Philadelphia Phillies

MLB statistics
- Batting average: .234
- Home runs: 0
- Runs batted in: 2
- Stats at Baseball Reference

Teams
- Philadelphia Phillies (1951–1952)

Richard Ennis Young (June 3, 1928 – January 7, 2018) was an American professional baseball player. He played parts of two seasons in Major League Baseball for the Philadelphia Phillies, primarily as a second baseman. He played 15 games for the Phillies during the 1951 Philadelphia Phillies season and five games during the 1952 Philadelphia Phillies season.

Young died January 7, 2018.
