= Andy Varga =

American baseball player (1930–1992)

- Pitcher
- Born: December 11, 1930; Chicago, Illinois, U.S.
- Died: November 4, 1992 (aged 61); Orlando, Florida, U.S.
- Batted: Right Threw: Left

MLB debut
- September 9, 1950, for the Chicago Cubs

Last MLB appearance
- September 23, 1951, for the Chicago Cubs

MLB statistics
- Win–loss record: 0–0
- Earned run average: 2.25
- Strikeouts: 1
- Stats at Baseball Reference

Teams
- Chicago Cubs (1950–1951)

Andrew William Varga (December 11, 1930 – November 4, 1992) was an American Major League Baseball pitcher who played for two seasons. He pitched with the Chicago Cubs for one game during the 1950 Chicago Cubs season and two games during the 1951 Chicago Cubs season. The 6 ft 4 in (1.93 m), 187 lb (85 kg) left-hander allowed two hits and six bases on balls in four Major League innings pitched.

== Playing career ==
Year	Team	League	Level	Affiliate
1950	Decatur Commodores	Illinois-Indiana-Iowa League	B	CIN
1950	Chicago Cubs	National League	MLB	CHC
1951	Grand Rapids Jets	Central League	A	CHC
1951	Springfield Cubs	International League	AAA	CHC
1951	Chicago Cubs	National League	MLB	CHC
1952	Blackwell Broncos	Kansas-Oklahoma-Missouri League	D	CHC
1953	Cedar Rapids Indians	Illinois-Indiana-Iowa League	B	CHC
1953	Janesville Cubs	Wisconsin State League	D	CHC
