= Larry Ciaffone =

American baseball player (1924–1991)

- Outfielder / Pinch hitter
- Born: August 17, 1924; New York City, New York, U.S.
- Died: December 14, 1991 (aged 67); New York City, New York, U.S.
- Batted: Right Threw: Right

MLB debut
- April 17, 1951, for the St. Louis Cardinals

Last MLB appearance
- May 3, 1951, for the St. Louis Cardinals

MLB statistics
- Batting average: .000
- At bats: 5
- Runs scored: 0
- Stats at Baseball Reference

Teams
- St. Louis Cardinals (1951)

Lawrence Thomas Ciaffone (August 17, 1924 – December 14, 1991), nicknamed "Symphony Larry", was an American professional baseball player whose ten-year playing career (1946–1955), largely as an outfielder, catcher and first baseman, included a six-game trial with the St. Louis Cardinals of Major League Baseball during the opening weeks of the 1951 season. Ciaffone threw and batted right-handed, stood 5 feet 9 inches (1.75 m) tall and weighed 185 pounds (84 kg).

Born in Brooklyn, New York, he attended Lafayette High School before transferring to Abraham Lincoln High School to be teammates with his cousin Frank Ciaffone, a star pitcher. Both signed with the Brooklyn Dodgers upon graduation but their baseball careers were delayed by military service in World War II. Larry entered the United States Army, and saw combat at the Battle of the Bulge in 1944–45. Frank enlisted in the United States Marines and was fatally wounded in the Battle of Iwo Jima on March 3, 1945.

Returning from wartime service at the age of 22, Larry Ciaffone began his playing career in the Brooklyn farm system, but was drafted by the Cardinals after only one season at the Class B level. He progressed through the Cardinal system, and after batting .324 for the Triple-A Rochester Red Wings in 1950, he made the Cardinals' early-season, 28-man roster in 1951. Ciaffone appeared in six games as a pinch hitter and substitute left fielder. He went hitless in five at bats with one base on balls, then returned to Rochester for the balance of the season.
