= Dan Lewandowski =

American baseball player (1928–1996)

- Pitcher
- Born: January 6, 1928; Buffalo, New York, U.S.
- Died: July 19, 1996 (aged 68); Hamilton, Ontario, Canada
- Batted: Right Threw: Right

MLB debut
- September 22, 1951, for the St. Louis Cardinals

Last MLB appearance
- September 30, 1951, for the St. Louis Cardinals

MLB statistics
- Win–loss record: 0–1
- Earned run average: 9.00
- Strikeouts: 1
- Stats at Baseball Reference

Teams
- St. Louis Cardinals (1951)

Daniel William Lewandowski (January 6, 1928 – July 19, 1996) was an American Major League Baseball pitcher who played in two games with the St. Louis Cardinals in 1951. He became a Little League coach in Hamilton, Ontario for 25 years until his death at the age of 69 due to a stroke.
