= Bubba Church =

American baseball player (1924–2001)

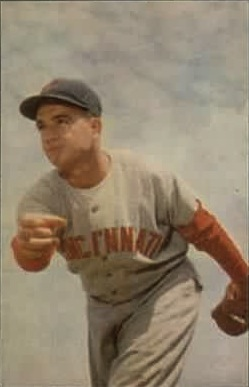
- Church, circa 1953
- Pitcher
- Born: September 12, 1924; Birmingham, Alabama, U.S.
- Died: September 17, 2001 (aged 77); Birmingham, Alabama, U.S.
- Batted: Right Threw: Right

MLB debut
- April 30, 1950, for the Philadelphia Phillies

Last MLB appearance
- May 1, 1955, for the Chicago Cubs

MLB statistics
- Win–loss record: 36–37
- Earned run average: 4.10
- Strikeouts: 274
- Stats at Baseball Reference

Teams
- Philadelphia Phillies (1950–1952); Cincinnati Reds / Redlegs (1952–1953); Chicago Cubs (1953–1955)

Emory Nicholas "Bubba" Church (September 12, 1924 – September 17, 2001) was an American professional baseball right-handed starting pitcher who played in Major League Baseball (MLB) for the Philadelphia Phillies (1950–52), Cincinnati Reds / Redlegs (1952–53), and Chicago Cubs (1953–55).

A native of Birmingham, Alabama, Church posted a 36–37 record, with 274 strikeouts, and a 3.37 earned run average (ERA), in 999 2/3 innings pitched, over the course of his six-season big league career.

== Baseball career ==
During his rookie season, Church was playing a key role for the famed 1950 "Whiz Kids" Phillies in their fight for a pennant. He pitched a week later, but after the game his season was over, and he did not play in the 1950 World Series. He finished 1950 at 8–6 with an ERA of 2.73 and two shutouts in 142 innings.

Church enjoyed his most productive season in 1951, when he collected career-highs in victories (15), strikeouts (104), shutouts (4) and innings (246), including a one-hitter over the Pittsburgh Pirates. Early in the 1952 season, he was traded to the Reds. Church was 5–9 for Cincinnati, and 7–8 for the Reds and the Chicago Cubs in 1953. He pitched for the Cubs until his career ended in 1955.

Prior to Church's professional baseball career, he served in the United States Army Air Forces during World War II serving in the China Burma India Theater.

== Death ==
On September 17, 2001, Church died at his home in Birmingham, Alabama, at the age of 77.
