= Russ Meyer (baseball) =

American baseball player (1923–1997)

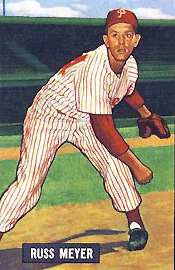
- Meyer with the Phillies in 1951
- Pitcher
- Born: October 25, 1923; Peru, Illinois, U.S.
- Died: November 16, 1997 (aged 74); Oglesby, Illinois, U.S.
- Batted: Switch Threw: Right

MLB debut
- September 13, 1946, for the Chicago Cubs

Last MLB appearance
- June 28, 1959, for the Kansas City Athletics

MLB statistics
- Win–loss record: 94–73
- Earned run average: 3.99
- Strikeouts: 672
- Stats at Baseball Reference

Teams
- As player: Chicago Cubs (1946–1948); Philadelphia Phillies (1949–1952); Brooklyn Dodgers (1953–1955); Cincinnati Redlegs (1956); Chicago Cubs (1956); Boston Red Sox (1957); Kansas City Athletics (1959); As coach: New York Yankees (1992)

Career highlights and awards
- World Series champion (1955)

Russell Charles Meyer (October 25, 1923 – November 16, 1997) was an American professional baseball player. A right-handed pitcher, Meyer's professional career lasted for 16 seasons, including 319 games pitched over all or part of 13 years in Major League Baseball for the Chicago Cubs (1946–48; 1956), Philadelphia Phillies (1949–52), Brooklyn Dodgers (1953–55), Cincinnati Redlegs (1956), Boston Red Sox (1957) and Kansas City Athletics (1959). The native of Peru, Illinois, was listed as 6 feet 1 inch (1.85 m) tall and 175 pounds (79 kg). His hot temper earned him the nickname "Mad Monk".

Initially signed by the Chicago White Sox as an amateur free agent in 1942, Meyer spent 1943 performing United States Army service during World War II. While pitching for his camp team, Meyer was stricken with appendicitis, then contracted peritonitis; he was given a medical discharge and released by the White Sox organization. He signed with the crosstown Cubs, spent three seasons in the Class A1 (now Double-A) Southern Association, and made his major league debut with the Cubs on September 13, 1946.

Among Meyer's ten full big-league seasons, two stand out. In 1949, with the Phillies, he won 17 of 25 decisions with a 3.08 earned run average (seventh in the National League), as Philadelphia finished in the first division for only the second time since World War I. Then, in his maiden campaign for the Dodgers in 1953, he went 15–5, for a sparkling .750 winning percentage. However, his ERA was a poor 4.56 and he surrendered 25 home runs in 1911/3 innings pitched—testimony to the Dodgers' potent offense and the intimate dimensions of Ebbets Field, where Meyer's earned run average was 5.28. That season, Brooklyn won 105 games and its second consecutive National League pennant.

Overall, Meyer posted a career MLB win–loss record of 94–73 (.563) with an ERA of 3.99 in his 319-game career, which included 219 starting pitcher assignments. He allowed 1,606 hits and 543 bases on balls in 1,5311/3 innings pitched, striking out 672. He registered 65 complete games and 13 shutouts, and five saves. He worked in three World Series (1950, 1953 and 1955), all against the New York Yankees. In four relief appearances, he went 0–1 (3.09), allowing four earned runs in 112/3 innings of work. He was a member of Brooklyn's 1955 World Championship squad.

Several years after his active career ended, he became a minor league pitching coach in the Yankees' organization, and served one season (1992) on the MLB staff of Yankees' manager Buck Showalter. On May 6, 1961, Meyer served as a television color commentator alongside Bob Finnegan for a game between the Detroit Tigers and Chicago White Sox on CBS. He died in 1997 at age 74.

Meyer was the first of three pitchers in major league history to have at least 23 consecutive road starts without a loss: Allie Reynolds has the record with 25, spanning the 1948 and 1949 seasons, a feat Kansas City Royals pitcher Chris Young nearly matched. Meyer had 24 consecutive road starts without a loss during the 1953 and 1954 seasons.
