= Bill Howerton =

American baseball player (1921–2001)

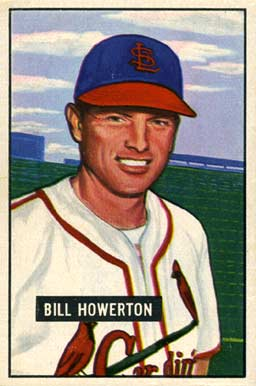
- Outfielder
- Born: December 12, 1921; Lompoc, California, U.S.
- Died: December 18, 2001 (aged 80); Blakely, Pennsylvania, U.S.
- Batted: Left Threw: Right

MLB debut
- September 11, 1949, for the St. Louis Cardinals

Last MLB appearance
- June 29, 1952, for the New York Giants

MLB statistics
- Batting average: .274
- Home runs: 22
- Runs batted in: 106
- Stats at Baseball Reference

Teams
- St. Louis Cardinals (1949–1951); Pittsburgh Pirates (1951–1952); New York Giants (1952)

William Ray Howerton (December 12, 1921 – December 18, 2001) was an American professional baseball player. An outfielder, he appeared in Major League Baseball in 247 games played during all or part of four seasons (1949–1952), for the St. Louis Cardinals, Pittsburgh Pirates, and New York Giants. The native of Lompoc, California, batted left-handed, threw right-handed; he stood 5 feet 11 inches (1.80 m) tall and weighed 185 pounds (84 kg).

Howerton grew up on a ranch in Santa Ynez, California. After graduation, from Santa Ynez High School, he attended St. Mary's College of California. He signed with the Boston Red Sox in 1943 and played three seasons in their farm system before being acquired by the Cardinals' organization. In September 1949, after Howerton batted .329 with 111 runs batted in for the Triple-A Columbus Red Birds, he was recalled by the Cardinals for a late-season trial. In 1950, he made the Redbird roster out of spring training and had his most successful MLB season, appearing in 110 games and collecting 88 hits (38 for extra bases) and 59 runs batted in. He was traded to the Pirates on June 15, 1951, in a deal that included fellow Redbirds Howie Pollet, Ted Wilks and Joe Garagiola, and played in 80 games for Pittsburgh, batting .274 in his last full MLB season.

After retiring, Howerton entered the trucking business in California. He died in Blakely, Pennsylvania, at age 80. His son, also named Bill, was the head baseball coach of the University of Scranton from 1987 to 2002.
