= Lou Possehl =

American baseball player (1926–1997)

- Pitcher
- Born: April 12, 1926; Chicago, Illinois, U.S.
- Died: October 7, 1997 (aged 71); Sarasota, Florida, U.S.
- Batted: Right Threw: Right

MLB debut
- August 25, 1946, for the Philadelphia Phillies

Last MLB appearance
- June 4, 1952, for the Philadelphia Phillies

MLB statistics
- Win–loss record: 2–5
- Earned run average: 5.26
- Strikeouts: 22
- Innings pitched: 51 1/3
- Stats at Baseball Reference

Teams
- Philadelphia Phillies (1946–1948, 1951–1952)

Louis Thomas Possehl (April 12, 1926 – October 7, 1997) was an American professional baseball player. A right-handed pitcher, he played in parts of five Major League seasons for the Philadelphia Phillies (1946–48; 1951–52). He was born in Chicago, Illinois, stood 6 feet 2 inches (1.88 m) tall and weighed 180 pounds (82 kg).

Possehl appeared in 15 Major League games, eight as a starting pitcher. In 51 1/3 innings pitched, he surrendered 62 hits and 24 bases on balls, with 22 strikeouts. In his only complete game, on September 20, 1948, he defeated the Pittsburgh Pirates 7–4 at Shibe Park, allowing eight hits and four walks.
