= Joe Muir =

American baseball player (1922–1980)

- Pitcher
- Born: November 26, 1922; Oriole, Maryland, U.S.
- Died: June 25, 1980 (aged 57); Baltimore, Maryland, U.S.
- Batted: Left Threw: Left

MLB debut
- April 21, 1951, for the Pittsburgh Pirates

Last MLB appearance
- June 27, 1952, for the Pittsburgh Pirates

MLB statistics
- Win–loss record: 2–5
- Earned run average: 5.19
- Strikeouts: 22
- Stats at Baseball Reference

Teams
- Pittsburgh Pirates (1951–1952)

Joseph Allen Muir (November 26, 1922 – June 25, 1980) was an American Major League Baseball pitcher. The 6 ft 1 in (1.85 m), 172 lb (78 kg) left-hander played parts of two seasons in the majors, 1951 and 1952, for the Pittsburgh Pirates, allowing 53 hits and 25 bases on balls in 52 innings pitched in 21 games played. His professional baseball career lasted for seven seasons (1947–1953), spent in the Pirates' organization.

A native of Oriole, Maryland, on that state's Eastern Shore, Muir was inducted into The Eastern Shore Baseball Hall of Fame in 1982, two years after his death at age 57.
