= Jim Konstanty =

American baseball player (1917–1976)

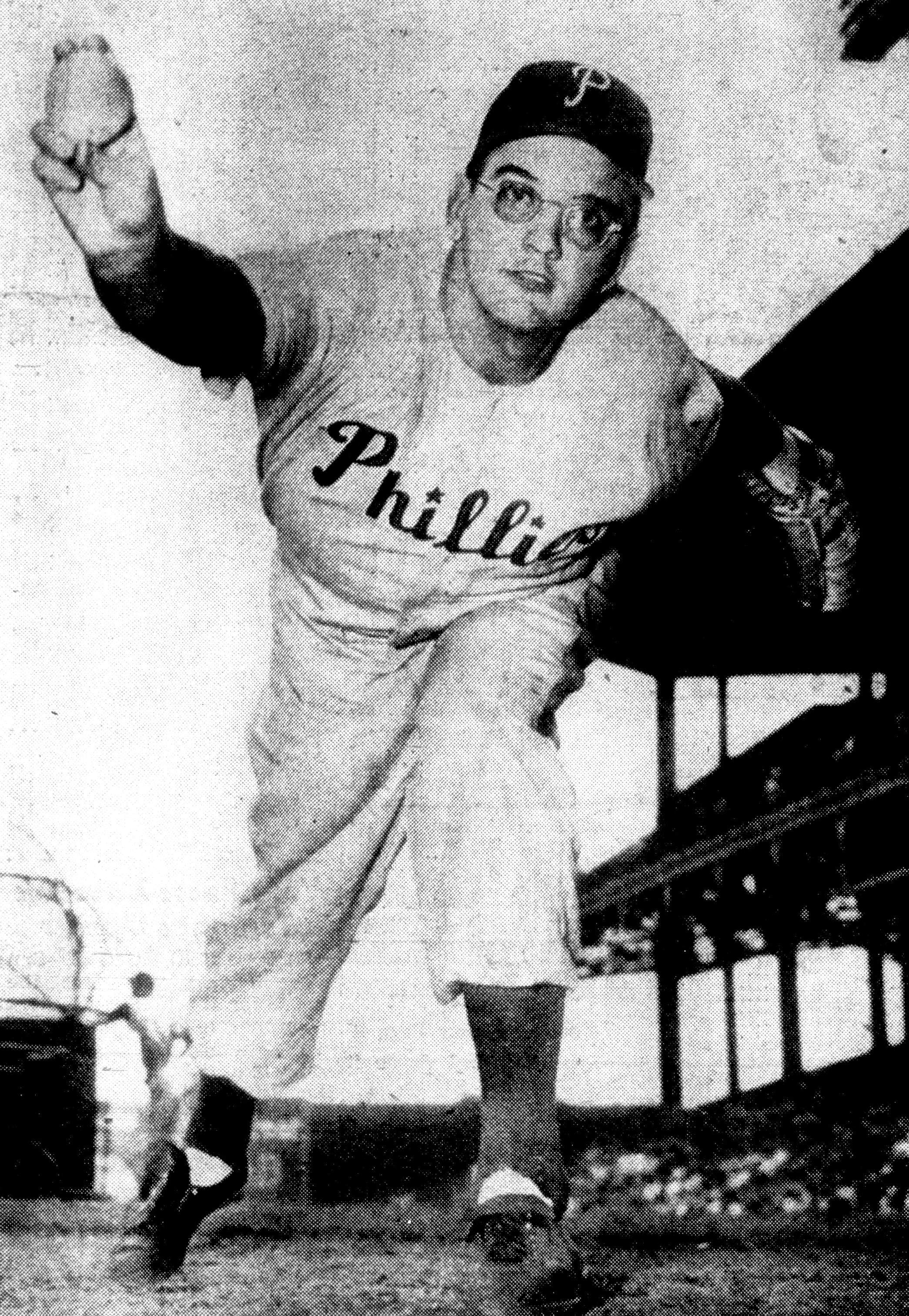
- Konstanty, circa 1950
- Pitcher
- Born: March 2, 1917; Strykersville, New York, U.S.
- Died: June 11, 1976 (aged 59); Oneonta, New York, U.S.
- Batted: Right Threw: Right

MLB debut
- June 18, 1944, for the Cincinnati Reds

Last MLB appearance
- September 19, 1956, for the St. Louis Cardinals

MLB statistics
- Win–loss record: 66–48
- Earned run average: 3.46
- Strikeouts: 268
- Saves: 74
- Stats at Baseball Reference

Teams
- Cincinnati Reds (1944); Boston Braves (1946); Philadelphia Phillies (1948–1954); New York Yankees (1954–1956); St. Louis Cardinals (1956)

Career highlights and awards
- All-Star (1950); NL MVP (1950)

Casimir James Konstanty (March 2, 1917 – June 11, 1976) was an American professional baseball relief pitcher in Major League Baseball and National League Most Valuable Player of 1950. He played for the Cincinnati Reds (1944), Boston Braves (1946), Philadelphia Phillies (1948–1954), New York Yankees (1954–1956) and St. Louis Cardinals (1956). Konstanty batted and threw right-handed, stood 6 feet 1 inch (1.85 m) tall and weighed 202 pounds (92 kg).

== Early life ==
Originally from the New York hamlet of Strykersville, he was the son of a farmer. Konstanty starred in sports in high school in Arcade, New York, and also at Syracuse University, where he earned a bachelor of science degree. He was a member of the university basketball team from 1936 to 1939. Konstanty was a physical education teacher in Saint Regis Falls, New York, before becoming a professional baseball player. He pitched in semi-pro leagues for the Malone Maroons and the Massena Alcos (sponsored by the Aluminum Company of America) in 1940 and 1941. In one game he struck out 11 batters while playing for Massena.

== Career ==
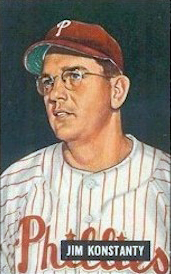
Konstanty's 1951 Bowman Gum baseball card

Konstanty began his pro career in 1941 at age 24. He pitched briefly with the Cincinnati Reds in 1944 and Boston Braves in 1946, while spending 1945 performing United States Navy service. Then he spent three seasons in the minors until 1948, when the Phillies called him up. He became a relief specialist who employed a slider and a change-up with great effectiveness.

In 1950, when the Phils "Whiz Kids" won the National League pennant, Konstanty was named the Most Valuable Player; to date, he is the only National League relief pitcher to achieve such an honor. He appeared in 74 games (then a major league record), winning 16 games with a National League leading 22 saves. He made the NL All-Star team and received the AP Athlete of the Year and the TSN Pitcher of the Year awards. In a surprise move, he was named to start Game 1 of the 1950 World Series against the New York Yankees. Konstanty gave up only four hits in eight innings but lost 1–0, his efforts outdone by Vic Raschi's two-hit shutout.

Konstanty lost some of his effectiveness after his spectacular 1950 season and was sent to the Yankees in the midseason of 1954. He played two seasons in New York, half a season for the St. Louis Cardinals, and a few games for the San Francisco Seals before retiring in 1957. In his 11-season career, Konstanty posted a 66–48 record with 74 saves and a 3.46 ERA in 433 games. In 9452/3 innings pitched, he struck out 268 and allowed 957 hits and 269 bases on balls. In his 36 games started, he amassed 14 complete games and two shutouts.

== Post-playing career ==
Konstanty lived in Worcester, New York. He opened a sporting goods store in Oneonta, New York in 1948, and he would operate that store until 1973. He served as a minor-league pitching coach for the St. Louis Cardinals. From 1968 to 1972 he was the director of athletics at Hartwick College in Oneonta, New York. He lived in Worcester until his death at the age of 59.

In 2008, Casimir (Jim) Konstanty was elected into the National Polish-American Sports Hall of Fame.

== See also ==
- List of Major League Baseball annual saves leaders
