= John Buttrick =

American soldier (1731–1791)

- Born: July 20, 1731
- Died: May 16, 1791 (aged 59); Concord, Massachusetts
- Military career
- Rank: Major
- Units: Concord, Massachusetts Militia
- Conflicts: American Revolutionary War; Battle of Concord

John Buttrick (July 20, 1731— May 16, 1791, Concord, Massachusetts) was one of the leaders of the Concord militia during the Battle of Concord on April 19, 1775. Given the usual interpretation of the first stanza of Ralph Waldo Emerson's famous poem "Concord Hymn," Buttrick is the man who ordered "the shot heard around the world."

== Battle of Concord ==
Buttrick played two notably critical roles in the Battle of Concord. Prior to the battle, the Concord militia and neighboring towns—then outnumbered by about 700 to 250—retreated to a ridge overlooking Concord as its command discussed immediate strategy. Colonel James Barrett surrendered the town of Concord and led the men across its Old North Bridge to a hill about a mile north of town, where they could continue to watch the troop movements of the British and the activities in the center of town. (This step proved fortuitous, as the ranks of troops continued to grow as Minuteman companies and additional militia arriving from the western towns joined them there.)

British Companies from the 4th and 10th Regiments, led by relatively inexperienced commander Captain Walter Laurie, had been stationed to guard their return route of the British troops; one company from the 43rd Regiment remained guarding the bridge itself. Upon seeing smoke rising from the village square, and seeing only a few companies directly below them, Colonel Barrett decided to march back toward the town from their vantage point on Punkatasset Hill to a lower, closer flat hilltop about 300 yards (274 m) from the North Bridge. Five full companies of Minutemen and five more of militia from Acton, Concord, Bedford and Lincoln occupied this hill as more groups of men streamed in, totaling at least 400 against Captain Laurie's light infantry companies, a force totaling 90–95 men.

As the militia advanced, the by now outnumbered British troops retreated from their position near the road to the bridge, yielding the hill to Barrett's men. Barrett ordered the Massachusetts men to form one long line two abreast on the highway leading down to the bridge. At around 10:30 a.m., after further consultation with his fellow officers, Barrett told the men to load their weapons but not to fire unless fired upon, and then ordered them to advance to the bridge. The militia troops approached the bridge in a column of two men abreast, they were led by their officers: Captain Isaac Davis, Major Buttrick of Concord, and Lt. Col. John Robinson of Westford.

The column of Minutemen and militia advanced on the light infantry in formation, keeping to the road, since it was surrounded by the spring floodwaters of the Concord River. Laurie ordered the British companies guarding the bridge to retreat across it. One officer then tried to pull up the loose planks of the bridge to impede the colonial advance, but Major Buttrick began to yell at the regulars to stop harming the bridge, preserving the militiamen's ability to continue to pursue their aims.

When the provincials were within about 75 yards of the bridge, the Regulars fired a few warning shots, wounding one. The British then fired a disorganized volley. Captain Davis was shot through the heart, becoming the first officer to die in the American Revolutionary War. At the same moment, Private Abner Hosmer of Acton became the first non-commissioned soldier to die. Seeing these casualties, Buttrick commanded, "Fire, fellow soldiers, for God's sake fire!"

The provincials returned fire, causing the British to abandon their wounded and immediately raced towards the advancing companies of British grenadiers approaching from Concord. This left isolated the companies that had been searching fruitlessly for the colonists' munitions at Barrett's farm. Buttrick and his militiamen then crossed the bridge to assume a defensive posture behind a stone wall.

As the detachment of regulars sent to Barrett's farm marched back, they passed through the now mostly-deserted battlefield and saw dead and wounded comrades lying on the bridge. One who had been killed by a hatchet to the head looked to them as if he had been scalped, angering and shocking them. They crossed the bridge and returned to the town by 11:30 AM, under the watchful eyes of the colonists, who continued to maintain defensive positions. The regulars continued to search for and destroy colonial military supplies in the town, ate lunch, reassembled for marching, and left Concord after noon. This delay in departure gave colonial militiamen from outlying towns additional time to reach the road back to Boston—on which they would inflict upon the British their worst casualties of the day.

== Legacy ==
Inscribed at the base of the statue called "The Minute Man," placed on the approximate site of Davis's death, is the first stanza of his "Concord Hymn," written in 1836:

By the rude bridge that arched the flood,

Their flag to April's breeze unfurled,
Here once the embattled farmers stood
And fired the shot heard round the world.

While the first shots of the exchange, like all shots that had found their targets earlier that morning at the skirmish in Lexington, had come from the British, it was the colonists' retort that Emerson had intended to memorialize. That first ever wartime attack by the colonial forces of the American Revolutionary War came at the order of the Major marching at the head of their advancing line, John Buttrick.

A street in Fitchburg Massachusetts bears his name in memorial.
