= Lexington–Concord Sesquicentennial half dollar =

1925 US commemorative coin

- United States
- Value: 50 cents (0.50 US dollars)
- Mass: 12.5 g
- Diameter: 30.61 mm (1.20 in)
- Thickness: 2.15 mm (0.08 in)
- Edge: Reeded
- Composition: 90.0% silver; 10.0% copper
- Silver: 0.36169 troy oz
- Years of minting: 1925
- Mintage: 162,099 including 99 pieces for the Assay Commission
- Mint marks: None, all pieces struck at Philadelphia Mint without mint mark.

Obverse
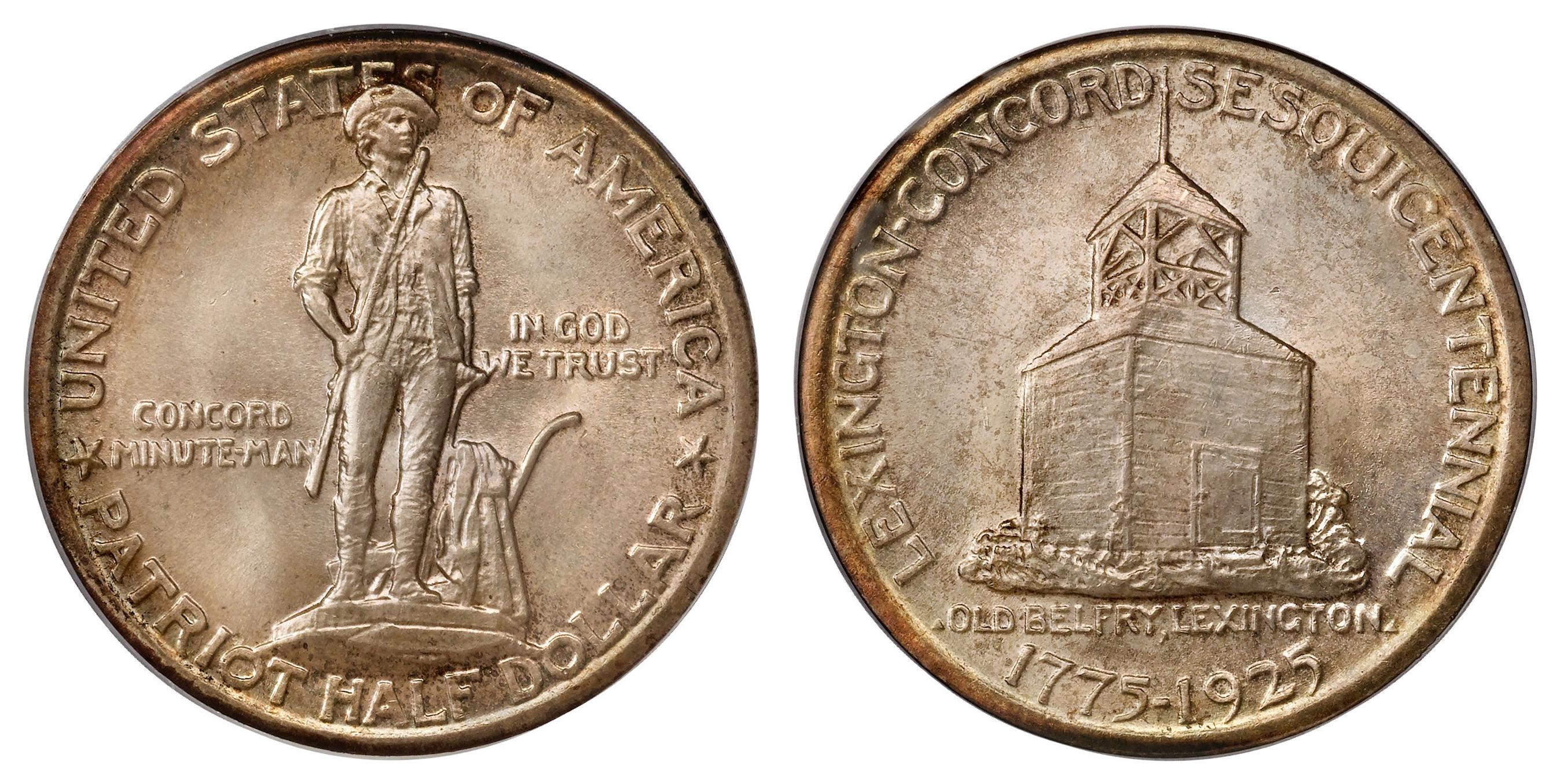
- Design: The Minute Man by Daniel Chester French, Concord, Massachusetts
- Designer: Chester Beach
- Design date: 1925

Reverse
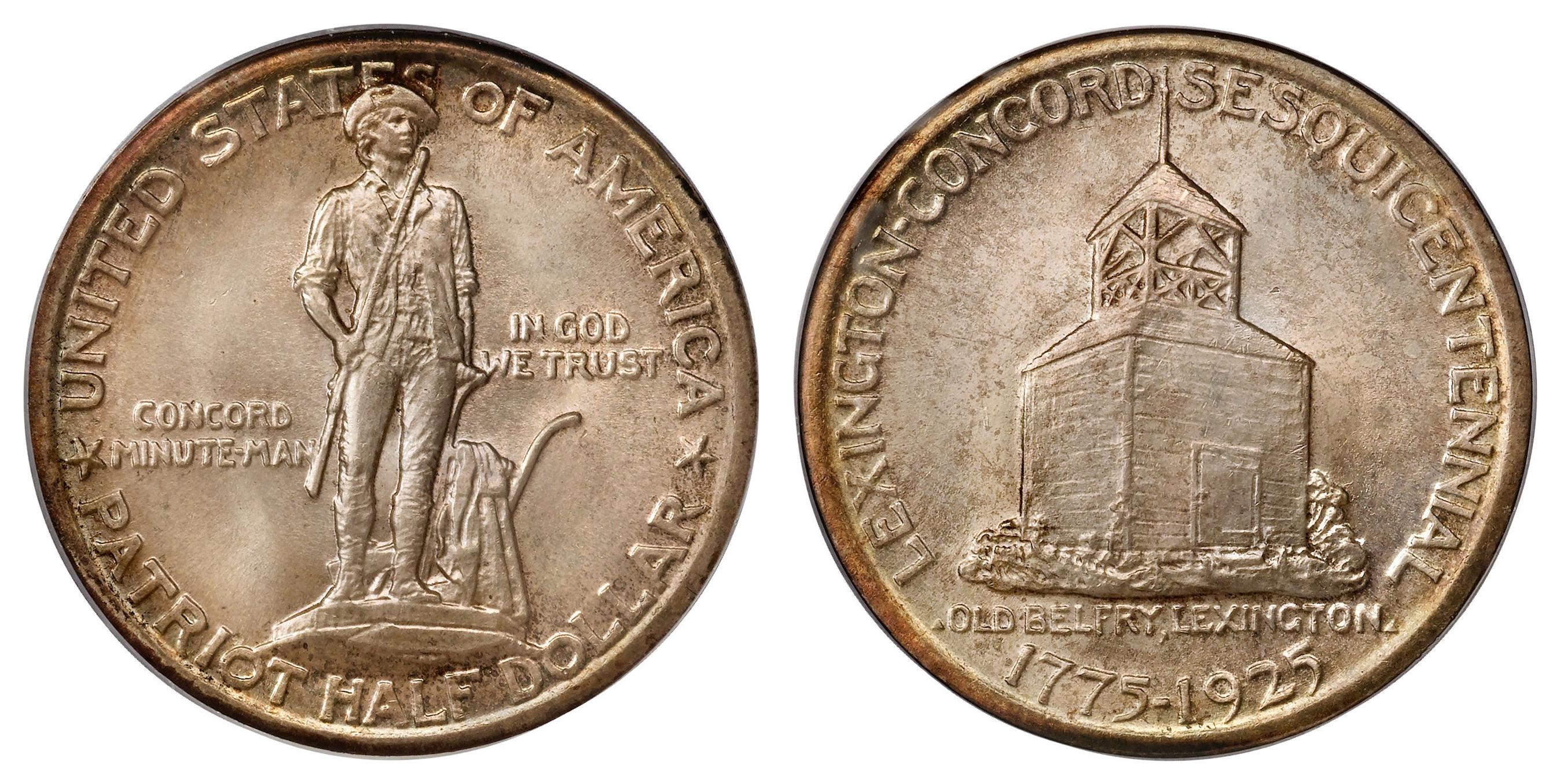
- Design: Old Belfry, Lexington, Massachusetts
- Designer: Chester Beach
- Design date: 1925

The Lexington–Concord Sesquicentennial half dollar, sometimes the Lexington–Concord half dollar or Patriot half dollar, is a commemorative fifty-cent piece struck by the United States Bureau of the Mint in 1925 in honor of the 150th anniversary of the Battles of Lexington and Concord, which began the American Revolutionary War. It was designed by Chester Beach and features Daniel Chester French's 1874 The Minute Man statue on the obverse.

Members of the Massachusetts congressional delegation introduced legislation in 1924 which would provide for a commemorative half dollar for the anniversary. The bill passed both houses of Congress and was signed by President Calvin Coolidge. Beach had to satisfy committees from both Lexington and Concord, and the Commission of Fine Arts passed the design only reluctantly, feeling Beach had been given poor materials to work with.

The coins were sold for $1 at the anniversary celebrations in Lexington and in Concord; they were also sold at banks across New England. Although just over half of the authorized mintage of 300,000 was struck, almost all the coins that were minted were sold. Depending on condition, they are catalogued in the hundreds of dollars.

== Background ==
The Battles of Lexington and Concord took place in those neighboring Massachusetts towns on April 19, 1775. The enmity between the British government and the American colonials that preceded the Revolutionary War had led, by early 1775, to militia groups, hostile to the British, being formed in the Boston area. These groups, under the control of Massachusetts leader John Hancock's Committee of Safety, were often dubbed minutemen for their readiness to assemble to fight at a moment's notice. Caches of munitions were stored at various towns for their use, including at Concord.

BEP engraved vignette Battle of Lexington which appeared on the $20 National Bank Note|alt=A printed engraving in black and white showing several people in 18th-century garb; one is firing a rifle. Another lies on the ground, dead or wounded; a woman tends to him.

The Secretary of State for the Colonies, Lord Dartmouth, instructed the British commander in Boston, General Thomas Gage, to stamp out this resistance. On April 18, 1775, Gage secretly ordered Lieutenant Colonel Francis Smith to go with 700 men to Concord and destroy the munitions there. It is uncertain how the Americans came to hear of the plan: Gage's wife Margaret was born in New Jersey and may have been a spy. Another local leader, Joseph Warren, informed Paul Revere and William Dawes, and the two men went by separate roads to Lexington to alert leaders and militia officers there that the British were coming. Both got through to Lexington, where they met with Hancock and Samuel Adams. The supplies in Concord were moved.

British troops began their march at 2 am on April 19, and Smith sent troops ahead under Major John Pitcairn. When Pitcairn and his men found a company of armed colonials at Lexington's town common, he ordered them to disperse. In the confusion, a shot was fired from an unknown source, which brought several volleys from the British troops. Eight of the local men were killed and one British soldier was wounded. The British burned or otherwise destroyed what supplies they could find in Concord, and a second confrontation took place at the North Bridge, in which the legendary "shot heard round the world" was fired. The bridge was held by the British, and by then about 400 minutemen had assembled. Seeing the smoke from Concord, the colonials believed the town was being burned, and attempted to cross the bridge to succor it. The British fired on them but the colonials returned fire and defeated them. The British, who had gotten reinforcements once they realized the countryside was roused against them, began their march to Boston harassed by at least 2,000 militiamen who inflicted a steady toll by gunfire until the British gained the protection of the cannon near Boston. The encounters at Lexington and Concord were the first battles of what became the Revolutionary War.

== Legislation ==
Identical joint resolutions to establish a United States Lexington–Concord Sesquicentennial Commission and to authorize federal participation in the celebrations surrounding the 150th anniversary of the battles were introduced into the House of Representatives by Massachusetts congressmen John Jacob Rogers and Frederick Dallinger on May 5, 1924. Robert Luce, also of that state, introduced an identical copy. Rogers represented Concord's district in Congress, while the townsfolk of Lexington were among Dallinger's constituents. All three bills were referred to the Committee on the Library, presided over by Luce. Hearings were held on May 8, 1924, with both Rogers and Dallinger present. Rogers spoke of the 1875 celebrations of the Lexington and Concord centennials, which President Ulysses S. Grant, Vice President Henry Wilson, Speaker of the House James G. Blaine and other notables had attended. These celebrations were not jointly held by Lexington and Concord; instead, there were two separate programs, though there was full cooperation between the two towns. They intended to follow this pattern for the 150th anniversary in 1925: although there would be considerable coordination, each town would have its own committee and its own events.

Rogers outlined the request for the establishment of the commission, with four members to be appointed by each house of Congress and three by President Calvin Coolidge. Rogers and Dallinger wanted $10,000 for the commission, and for Congress to authorize the issuance of commemorative coins and stamps. Rogers told the committee that the language for the legislative provisions for the coin had been borrowed from the bill for the Pilgrim Tercentenary half dollar (1920–1921), and reminded them of other commemorative coins that had been issued. At the time, commemorative coins were not sold by the government—Congress, in authorizing legislation, designated an organization which had the exclusive right to purchase the coins at face value and vend them to the public at a premium. A maximum of 300,000 coins was requested. Dallinger noted that the government would incur no cost from the commemorative half dollars: it would profit from the seignorage (Note: The difference between the cost of making the coin, including the value of the metal inside it, and the face value.) and would never be called upon to redeem them, as they would be retained by collectors. After the two congressmen appeared, Chairman Luce introduced a letter from the Senate Majority Leader, Henry Cabot Lodge of Massachusetts, indicating his support for the bill. Luce reported his own version of the resolution the following day, with his committee's recommendation that it pass.

The resolution was brought to the House floor on June 7, 1924, when Luce asked that the House pass the legislation. In his report, he had alluded to the well-known Ralph Waldo Emerson poem "Concord Hymn" by including the phrase "embattled farmers", a reference which Arkansas's Otis Wingo used as an excuse to deliver a lengthy speech on tariffs, accusing the Republican majority of harming the farmer. Once Wingo had finished to applause from the Democratic side, the House passed the bill without a recorded vote, with Rogers presiding over the House in the absence of the Speaker. The resolution was transmitted to the Senate the same day and was referred to the Senate Appropriations Committee. On January 5, 1925, the resolution was reported back to the Senate by Wyoming's Francis Warren, unamended, with the recommendation that it pass. Senator Joseph T. Robinson of Arkansas asked for the amount of the appropriation being made in the bill, and when told it was $15,000, had no additional questions. The bill passed without opposition, and was enacted with the signature of President Coolidge on January 14, 1925.

== Preparation ==
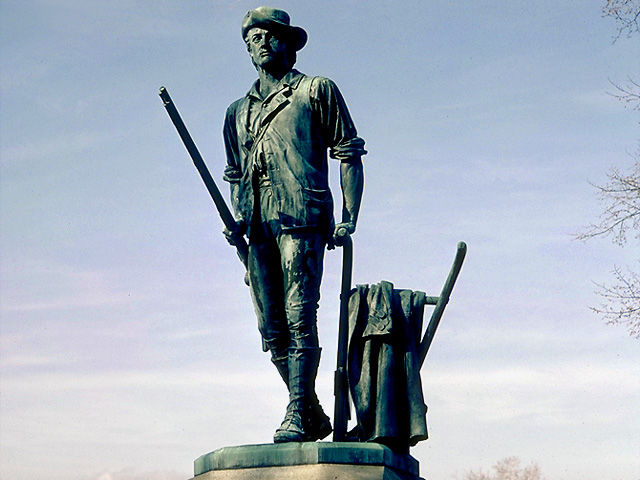
Daniel Chester French's 1874 statue The Minute Man

In 1923, the committees from Lexington and Concord each had considered pressing for a commemorative coin, and each, unbeknownst to the other, had contacted Chester Beach, credited with the design for the Monroe Doctrine Centennial half dollar. Beach got them to combine their efforts and each agreed to pay half of his fee of $1,250. Each town would decide the design for one side of the half dollar.

Judge Prescott Keyes, who led the Concord committee, sent Beach the proposed design for the obverse (the Concord side) on February 2, 1925, letting him know the Lexington design for the reverse, or Lexington side, would soon follow. The following day, Edward Stone, attorney for the Lexington committee, sent Beach a letter formalizing the contract. Beach would not be paid unless the Commission of Fine Arts approved the plaster models. Beach replied to Stone on the 4th, relating that he had spoken to James Earle Fraser, designer of the Buffalo nickel and sculptor member of the commission, and had been informed that the commission had just had its monthly meeting, but a quorum could be assembled to approve the coin. Beach noted that the Mint would take three or four weeks to begin striking coins once final approval was given; he had discussed this with Chief Engraver George T. Morgan in 1924. Morgan had recently died, but Beach did not expect the new chief engraver, John R. Sinnock, to cause any additional delays.

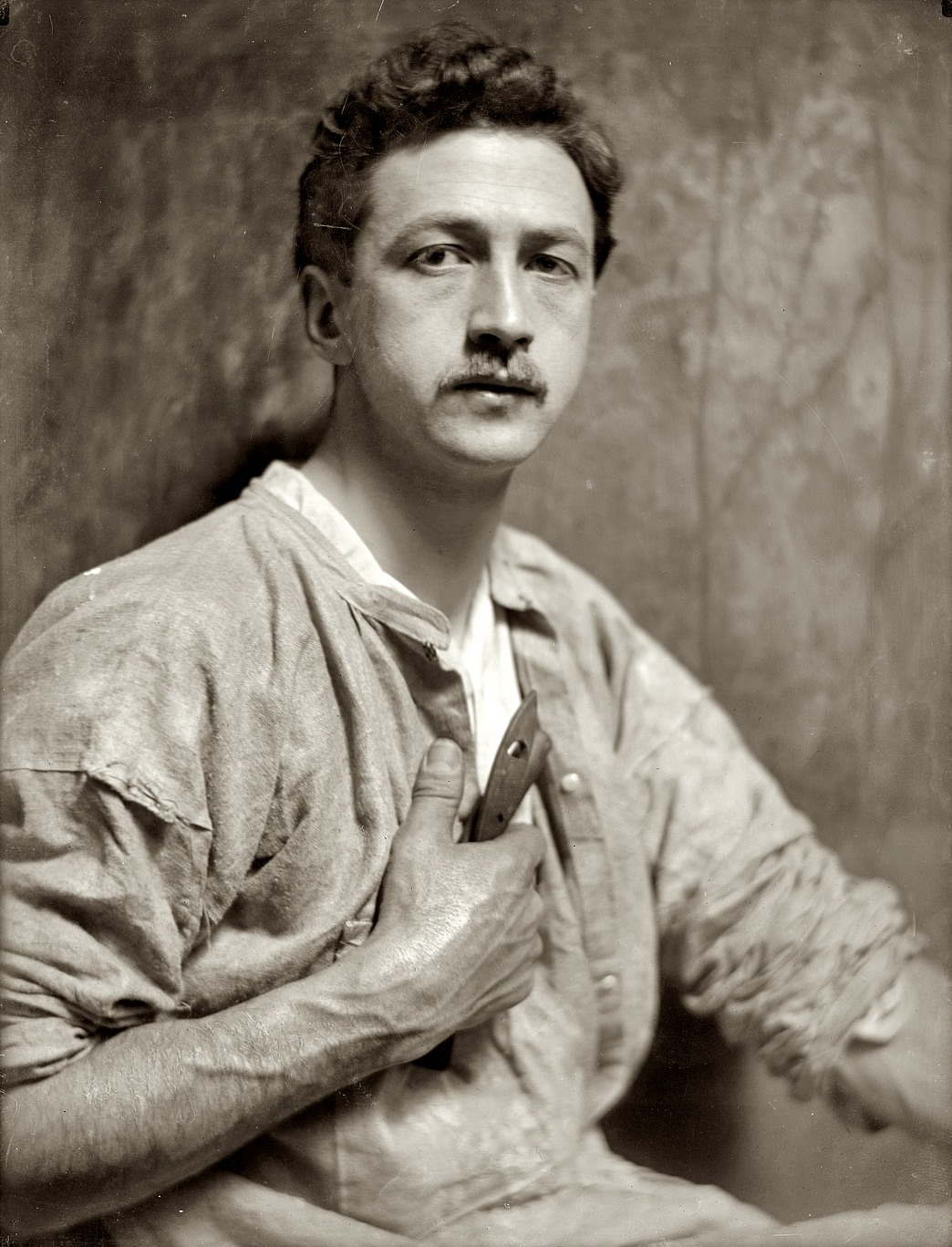
Chester Beach in 1910

On February 4, Concord artist Philip Holden sent Beach improved sketches for both sides. Beach had been under the impression that the year must appear on the coin by itself, in addition to the anniversary dates 1775–1925; on February 5 Keyes wrote to Beach that he had viewed the Pilgrim Tercentenary half dollar and the Huguenot-Walloon half dollar. Both bore their dates only as part of anniversaries. Keyes noted that the two coins had the words "PILGRIM" and "HUGUENOT" respectively before "HALF DOLLAR", and proposed that the word "PATRIOT" appear in the same place on the new coin. Keyes noted that April 19, the anniversary of both battles, is Patriot Day in Massachusetts. He insisted that the words "THE CONCORD MINUTE MAN" appear even if it was illegible, "the public in these two towns are sometimes pretty sensitive about petty matters and so Mr. Stone and I have been very particular to come to an agreement as to all details."

Beach agreed to the wording changes, subject to approval by the authorities in Washington. On February 12, 1925, Keyes wrote again to tell him that Harry B. Little, architect of the National Cathedral, had looked at the designs and had suggestions, including moving the words "E PLURIBUS UNUM" from the lower part of the Concord side to the left of the minuteman. He also proposed putting "April 19" on the coin; Beach did not do so, though he adopted other suggestions from Keyes. The Commission of Fine Arts felt that French's statue, due to its narrowness, was not suitable for a coin. Nevertheless, it approved the design, with Moore writing to Mint Director Robert J. Grant on March 5 that "a designer should be permitted to use symbols as he best knows how to use them in filling the spaces of a coin or medal."

By March 27, trial strikes had been made of the new coin at the Philadelphia Mint. Stone ordered an initial quantity of 100,000 half dollars on March 31.

== Design ==
By the rude bridge that arched the flood,
Their flag to April's breeze unfurled,
Here once the embattled farmers stood,
And fired the shot heard round the world.

— "Concord Hymn", by Ralph Waldo Emerson

The obverse reproduces Daniel Chester French's 1874 statue, The Minute Man, that stands in Concord. Commemorating the minutemen, volunteer militia who fought the British in 1775, it depicts a farmer, rifle in hand. His coat is draped over his plow, and he is ready to respond to the signal to assemble, presumably to be given by the bell in the Old Belfry at Lexington, the subject of the reverse of the coin. The minuteman's head obscures part of the name of the country he helped to establish, and he is flanked on the left by the words "CONCORD MINUTE-MAN" and on the right by "IN GOD WE TRUST". Not shown on the coin, but on the base of the statue in Concord, is the first stanza of Ralph Waldo Emerson's poem, "Concord Hymn", verses dutifully memorized by generations of American schoolchildren.

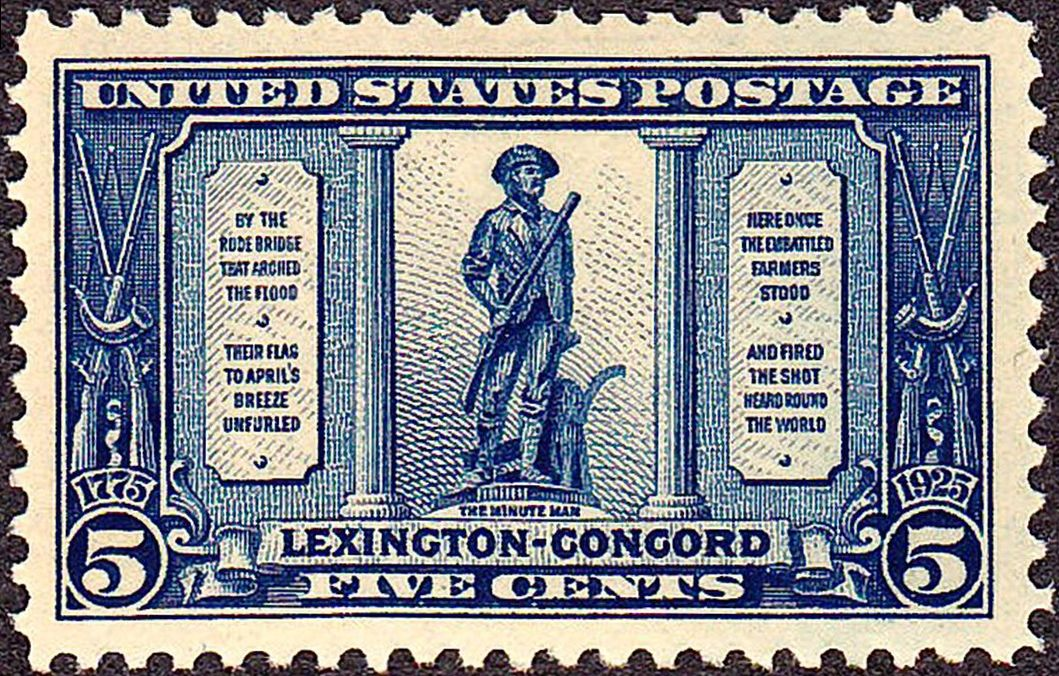
The United States Post Office Department issued a stamp for the anniversary depicting French's statue and Emerson's verse.

The reverse depicts the Old Belfry, located in Lexington, where a bell was sounded to assemble the local militia. The belfry was not then old, having been built following the donation of a bell weighing 463 pounds (210 kg) by Isaac Stone to the town of Lexington in 1761. The bell was sounded after Revere and Dawes arrived, but when no British soldiers appeared, Captain John Parker sent his men home, with instructions to remain ready. It was sounded again at 5:30 am, when word came the British were not far away.

Numismatist John F. Jones, in his 1937 survey of commemoratives, felt the statue and belfry highly appropriate subjects for the coin, but regretted that it lacked the clear, sharp lines of earlier special issues. Art historian Cornelius Vermeule, in his book on U.S. coins and medals, stated that the Lexington–Concord half dollar "is almost reduced to the artistic level of a photograph, for little is left that is original on the part of Beach". Vermeule deprecated the many inscriptions, though admitting they were forced on Beach, and especially disliked the placement of "In God We Trust": "nothing is more out of place than the religious motto." Vermeule opined that "although less irritating than his half-dollar for the Monroe Doctrine Centennial, this coin does no credit to Beach's stature as a first-class artist. What the coin exudes in patriotism, it lacks in art."

== Production, distribution, and collecting ==
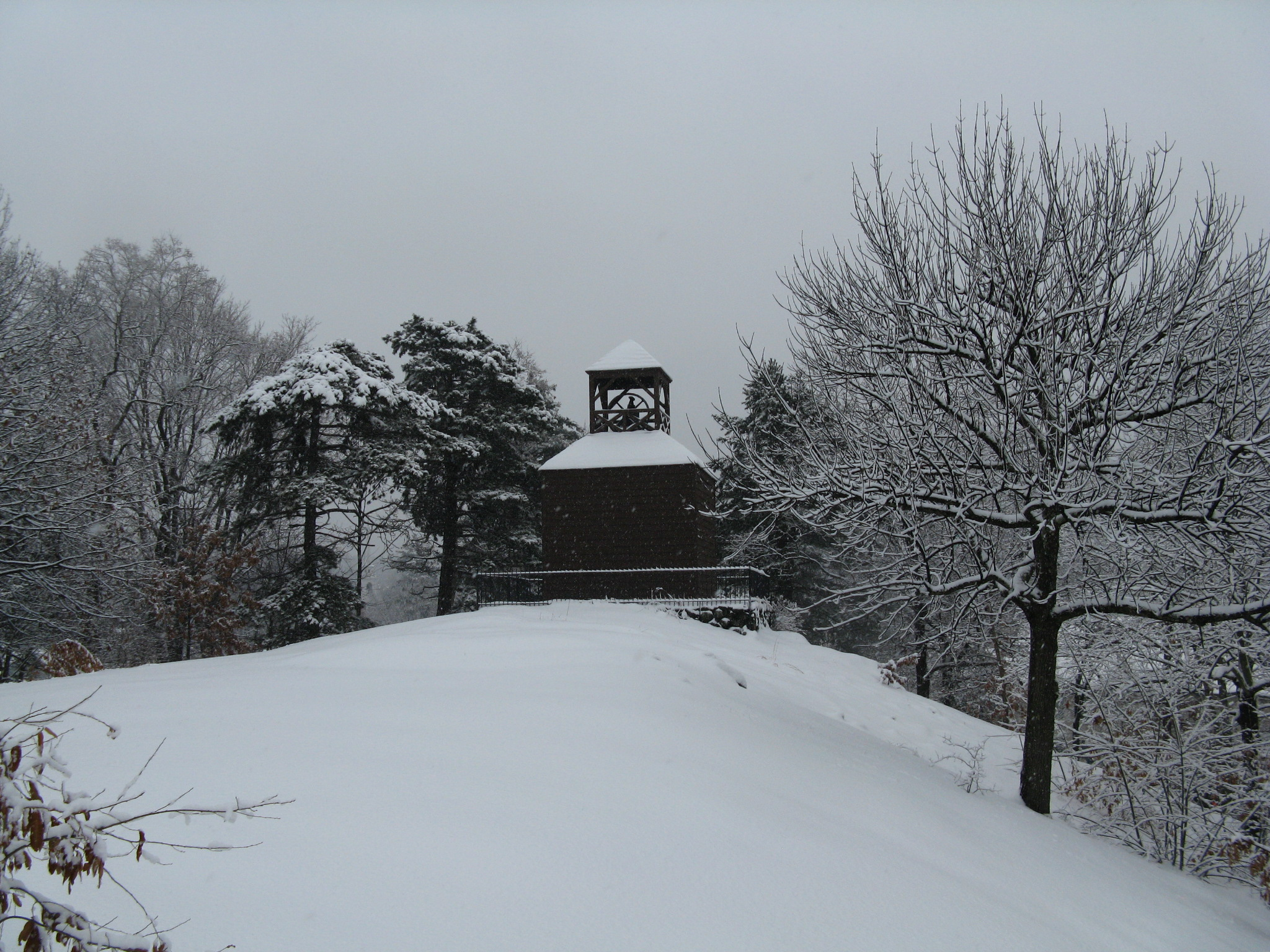
The Old Belfry, Lexington

A total of 162,099 Lexington–Concord Sesquicentennial half dollars were struck at the Philadelphia Mint in April and May 1925, with 99 pieces set aside for inspection and testing by the 1926 Assay Commission. The coins were made from blanks, or planchets, that had been intended for mintage into 1924 Stone Mountain Memorial half dollars, but had not been used.

The first coin struck was presented to President Coolidge. The half dollars were sold at the anniversary celebrations in Lexington and at those in Concord, both held April 18–20, 1925, with 39,000 sold in Lexington and 21,000 in Concord. Distribution was handled by the Lexington Trust Company and the Concord National Bank, which sold them in wooden boxes decorated with images of the statue and belfry. They were sold by banks throughout New England, and to some extent elsewhere in the country. Only 86 coins were returned to the Mint, likely representing damaged pieces. Most were sold to the general public, not to collectors. The asking price was $1. The edition of R.S. Yeoman's A Guide Book of United States Coins published in 2018 lists the half dollar at between $75 and $700 depending on condition. An exceptional specimen sold at auction in 2014 for $11,880.

== Sources ==
- Bowers, Q. David (1992). Commemorative Coins of the United States: A Complete Encyclopedia. Wolfeboro, NH: Bowers and Merena Galleries, Inc. ISBN 978-0-943161-35-8.
- Flynn, Kevin (2008). The Authoritative Reference on Commemorative Coins 1892–1954. Roswell, GA: Kyle Vick. OCLC 711779330.
- Jones, John F. (May 1937). "The Series of United States Commemorative Coins". The Numismatist. American Numismatic Association: 393–396.
- Slabaugh, Arlie R. (1975). United States Commemorative Coinage (second ed.). Racine, WI: Whitman Publishing. ISBN 978-0-307-09377-6.
- Swiatek, Anthony (2012). Encyclopedia of the Commemorative Coins of the United States. Chicago: KWS Publishers. ISBN 978-0-9817736-7-4.
- Swiatek, Anthony; Breen, Walter (1981). The Encyclopedia of United States Silver & Gold Commemorative Coins, 1892 to 1954. New York: Arco Publishing. ISBN 978-0-668-04765-4.
- Taxay, Don (1967). An Illustrated History of U.S. Commemorative Coinage. New York: Arco Publishing. ISBN 978-0-668-01536-3.
- United States House of Representatives Committee on the Library (May 8, 1924). One Hundred and Fiftieth Anniversary of the Battle of Lexington and Concord. United States Government Printing Office. (subscription required)
- Vermeule, Cornelius (1971). Numismatic Art in America. Cambridge, MA: The Belknap Press of Harvard University Press. ISBN 978-0-674-62840-3.
- Yeoman, R.S. (2015). A Guide Book of United States Coins (1st Deluxe ed.). Atlanta, Georgia: Whitman Publishing. ISBN 978-0-7948-4307-6.
- Yeoman, R. S. (2018). A Guide Book of United States Coins 2014 (Mega Red 4th ed.). Atlanta, GA: Whitman Publishing, LLC. ISBN 978-0-7948-4580-3.
