= Buttrick =

Buttrick is a surname. Notable people with the surname include:

- Barbara Buttrick (born 1930), English boxer
- Ellen Buttrick (born 1995), British Paralympic rower
- George Arthur Buttrick (1892–1980), English-born, American-based Christian preacher, author and lecturer
- John Buttrick (1731–1791), American Revolutionary War militiaman

== See also ==
- Battrick
