= Battrick =

Battrick is a surname. Notable people with the surname include:

- Gerald Battrick (1947–1998), Welsh tennis player
- Naomi Battrick (born 1991), English actress

== See also ==
- Buttrick
