= Minutemen =

American Revolutionary War militia

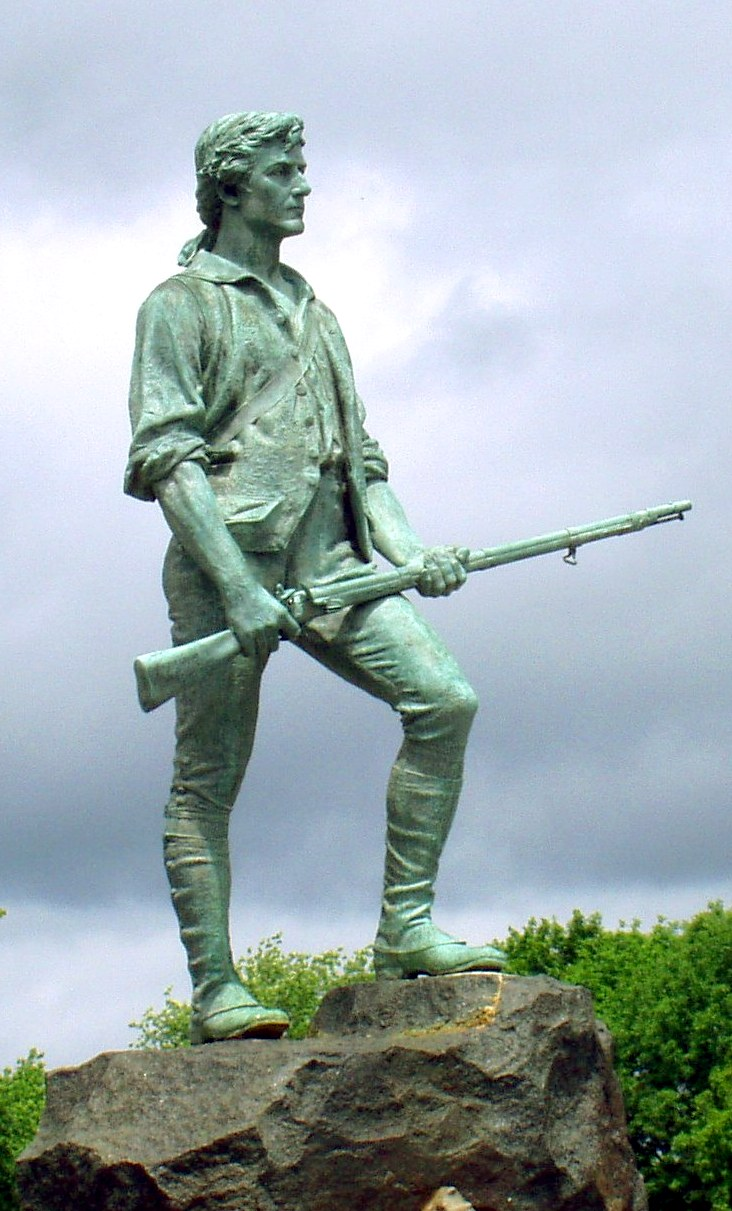
Lexington Minuteman, a 1900 monument by Henry Hudson Kitson pays tribute to the Minutemen during the American Revolutionary War

Minutemen were members of the organized militia companies in the Thirteen Colonies trained in weaponry, tactics, and military strategies leading up to and during the American Revolutionary War. They were known for being ready at a minute's notice, hence the name. Minutemen provided a highly mobile, rapidly deployed force that enabled the colonies to respond immediately to military threats. They were an evolution from the prior colonial rapid-response units.

The minutemen were among the first to fight in the American Revolution. Their teams constituted about a quarter of the entire militia. They were generally younger, more mobile, and provided with weapons and arms by the local governments. They were still part of the overall militia regimental organizations in their respective colonies.

The term has also been applied to various later United States civilian paramilitary forces.

== History ==
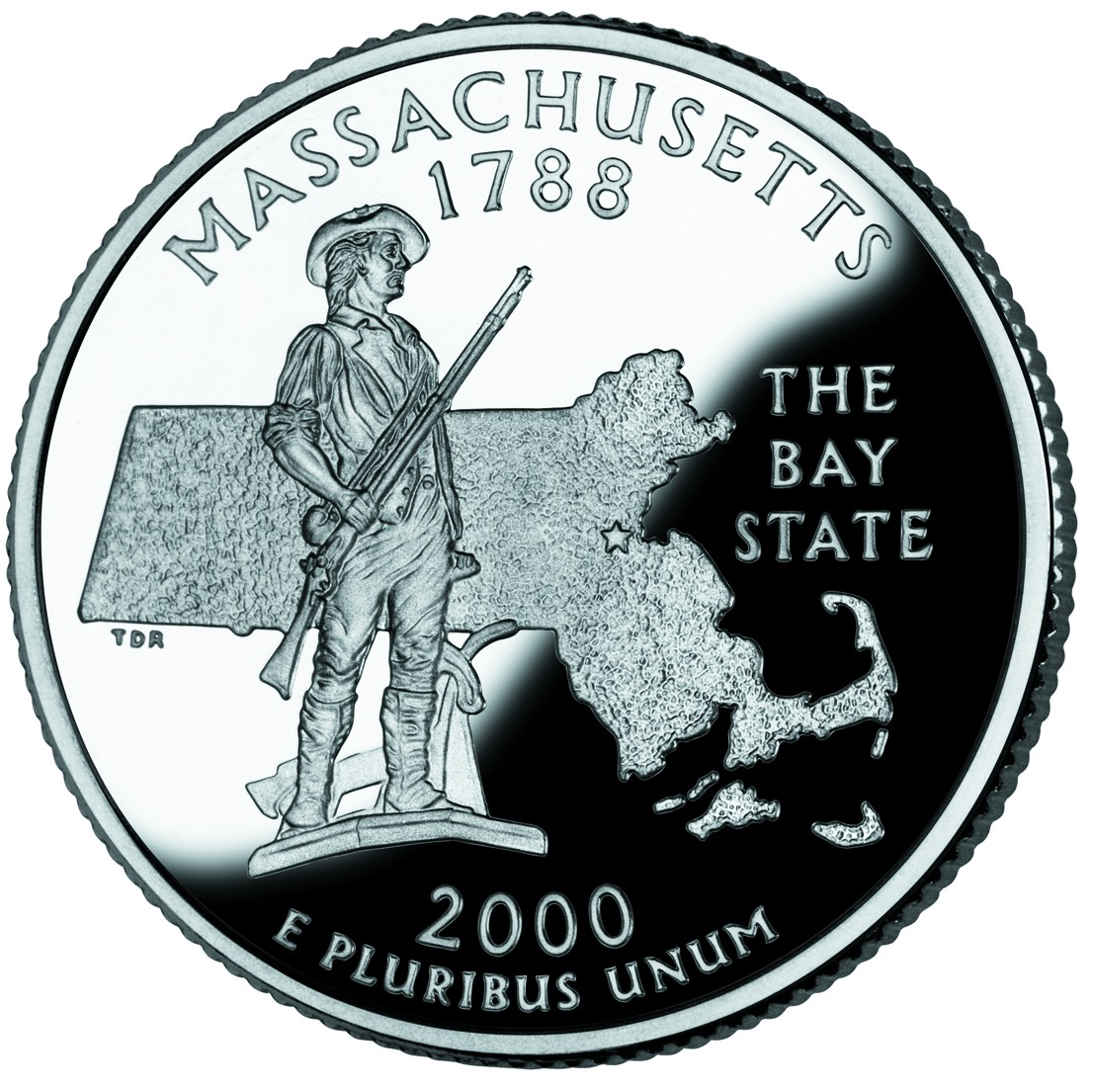
The Minute Man, a statue by Daniel Chester French on Massachusetts' state quarter

In the Massachusetts Bay Colony, all able-bodied men between the ages of 16 and 60 were required to participate in their local militia company. As early as 1645 in the Massachusetts Bay Colony, some men were selected from the general ranks of "town-based training band" to be ready for rapid deployment. Men so selected were designated as minutemen. Their companies were organized by town, so it was very common for their counterpart militia company to contain relatives and friends. Some towns in Massachusetts had a long history of designating a portion of their militia as minutemen, with "minute companies" constituting special units within the militia system whose members underwent additional training and held themselves ready to respond at a minute's notice to emergencies, which gave rise to their name as Minutemen.

The immediate predecessor to the organized Minuteman concept colony-wide was the Picket Guard, a concept of a rapid responder that never came to fruition because the legislation in the Colony of Massachusetts House of Representatives was never passed because the war ended. Members of the minutemen, in contrast to the regular militia, were no more than 30 years old, and were chosen for their enthusiasm, political reliability, and strength. They were the first armed militia to arrive at or await a battle. Officers were elected by popular vote, as in the rest of the militia, and each unit drafted a formal written covenant to be signed upon enlistment.

The militia in the New England colonies were organized in regiments by county. The militia and minutemen companies still were organized by town and trained typically as an entire unit in each town two to four times a year with the Minutemen receiving extra training. From the end of the French and Indian War, this was normal during peacetime but, in the 1770s, as friction with The Crown increased and the possibility of war became apparent, the militia trained three to four times a week.

In response to these tensions, the Massachusetts Provincial legislators found that the colony's militia resources were short just before the American Revolutionary War, on October 26, 1774, after observing the British military buildup. They found that, "including the sick and absent, it amounted to about 17,000 men, far short of the number wanted, that the council recommended an immediate application to the New England governments to make up the deficiency", resolving to re-organize and increase the size of the militia:

The Massachusetts General Assembly was stymied by Governor Hutchinson from passing a bill. As a result, resisting legislators, including Samuel Adams being among the leaders, set up Committees of Correspondence in parallel with their fellow Patriots in Connecticut, New Hampshire, and Rhode Island that recommended that the militia increase in size and reorganize and form special companies of minutemen, who should be equipped and prepared to march at the shortest notice. These minutemen were to comprise one-quarter of the whole militia, to be enlisted under the direction of the field-officers, and divide into companies, consisting of at least 50 men each. The privates were to choose their captains and subalterns, and these officers were to form the companies into battalions, and chose the field-officers to command the same. Hence the minute-men became a body distinct from the rest of the militia, and, by being more devoted to military exercises, they acquired skill in the use of arms. More attention than formerly was likewise bestowed on the training and drilling of militia.

The need for efficient minuteman companies was illustrated by the Powder Alarm of 1774. Militia companies were called out to engage British troops, who had been sent to capture ammunition stores. By the time the militia was ready, the British regulars had already captured the arms at Cambridge and Charlestown and had returned to Boston.

The reorganization increased the total size of the militia as well. During the French and Indian Wars, the counties in the New England colonies had provided provincial regiments to the armies of the Crown. In Massachusetts, Middlesex County provided two while most had provided one (except Worcester which had provided three). The new reorganization provided six regiments of militia with a nominal strength of 9,000 men with minuteman companies being formed from the younger, more physically fit men. The militia in New England was still midway through the process of splitting the Minutemen companies from the regular militia companies into their own regiments by the spring of 1775. For example, the old 2nd Middlesex Regiment of Foot, a provincial unit that had seen action in the French and Indian Wars, divided into a militia regiment under Colonel David Green and a Minuteman regiment Colonel Ebenezer Bridge. Colonel William Prescott's Middlesex regiment had not yet split and had ten companies of militia and seven of minutemen. Worcester County had managed to already complete the organization and staffing of three Minuteman regiments by April 1775.

=== Pequot War ===
In August 1636, the first offensive military attack by militias failed when Massachusetts dispatched John Endecott with four companies on an unsuccessful campaign against the Pequot Indians. According to one account, the expedition succeeded only in killing one Indian and burning some wigwams.

Weeks elapsed between the incidents that caused the march and the arrival of Endecott's men in the area. Once they got there, they did not know which Indians to fight or why. This feeble response served to encourage the Indians, and attacks increased on the settlers in the Connecticut Valley.

In the following year, the Province of Massachusetts Bay again put a force on the field in collaboration with Plymouth Colony and Connecticut. By the time that Plymouth had gotten their force packed and ready to march, the campaign had ended. Massachusetts Bay sent 150 militiamen, Plymouth sent 50, and Connecticut sent 90.

=== New England Confederation ===
In May 1643, a joint council was formed. They published the articles of the New England Confederation. The real power of the confederation was that all four of the colonies promised to contribute soldiers to an alert force that would fight anywhere in the colonies.

On September 7, 1643, the towns were given more tactical control. A new rule allowed any general to call up his militia at any time. On August 12, 1645, 30% of all militia were made into short-notice groups (minutemen). Command and control were decentralized to the extent that individual company commanders could put their troops into a defensive battle if necessary. A portion of the militia was well trained and well equipped, and set aside as a ready force.

In May 1653, the Council of Massachusetts said that an eighth of the militia should be ready to march within one day to anywhere in the colony. Eighty militiamen marched on the Narragansett tribe in Massachusetts, though no fighting took place. Since the colonies were expanding, the Narragansetts got desperate and began raiding the colonists again. The militia chased the Indians, caught their chief, and got him to sign an agreement to end fighting.

In 1672, the Massachusetts Council formed a military committee to control the militia in each town. In 1675, the military committee raised an expedition to fight the raiding Wampanoag tribe. A muster call was sent out and four days later, after harsh skirmishes with the Wampanoags, three companies arrived to help the locals. The expedition took heavy losses: two towns were raided, and one 80-man company was killed entirely, including their commander. That winter, a thousand militiamen pushed out the Wampanoags.

In response to the success of the Wampanoags, in the spring of 1676 an alarm system of riders and signals was formed in which each town was required to participate.

The Second Indian War broke out in 1689, and militiamen throughout the Thirteen Colonies began to muster in preparation for the fighting. In 1690, Colonel William Phips led 600 men to push back the French. Two years later he became governor of Massachusetts. When the French and Indians raided Massachusetts in 1702, Governor Phips created a bounty which paid 10 shillings each for the scalps of Indians. In 1703, snowshoes were issued to militiamen and bounty hunters to make winter raids on the Indians more effective. The minuteman concept was advanced by the snow shoe men.

The Minutemen always kept in touch with the political situation in Boston and their own towns. From 1629 to 1683, the towns had controlled themselves but in 1689, the King appointed governors. By 1772, James Otis and Samuel Adams used the town meetings to start a Committee of Correspondence. This instigated a boycott in 1774 of British goods. The Minutemen were aware of this as well.

With a rising number of Minutemen they faced another problem: a lack of gunpowder to support an army for long enough to fight a prolonged campaign against the British. The people of an island controlled by the Dutch, Sint Eustatius, were supportive of the American revolutionaries. As a token of support, they traded gunpowder to the Colonials for other goods needed in Europe. Not only did the Minutemen have political awareness of events in New England, but also of those occurring in Europe, such as Britain's lack of allies.

=== American Revolutionary War ===
A minuteman (second from left) in 1774–1775

In 1770, Samuel Adams had begun agitating for a reform and update of the militia in the provincial legislature. Hutchinson, the Royal Governor, had ignored him, but as tensions mounted, that tactic became less effective. Adams and his like-minded friends were gaining more traction. In May 1774, Hutchinson was relieved by General Thomas Gage, the new Governor of Massachusetts, who arrived with orders to close the port of Boston. Instead of tamping down disagreement between the colonists and the Crown, it escalated them. That same month, Parliament passed "An Act for the better regulating the Government of the Province of Massachusetts-Bay" and "An Act for the more impartial administration of justice in said Province," otherwise known as the Intolerable Acts, which were designed to remove power from the towns.

This brought many more citizens to Samuel Adams's side, and he pressed the Committees of Correspondence to hold County Conventions to revamp the militia. Gage tried to seat his own court in Worcester, but the townspeople blocked the court from sitting. Two thousand militiamen marched to intimidate the judges and get them to leave. This was the first time that the militia was used by the people to block the king's representatives from acting on royal orders and against popular opinion. Gage responded by preparing to march to collect munitions from the provincials. For 50 miles around Boston, militiamen were marching in response. By noon the next day, almost 4,000 people were on the common in Cambridge. The provincials got the judges to resign and leave. Gage backed off from trying to seat a court in Worcester.

The colonials in Worcester met and came up with a new militia mobilization plan in their County Convention. The Convention required that all current militia officers resign; the motive being that ranking officers in the militia could be considered strong Loyalists. Officers were then elected by their regiments. In turn, the officers then appointed one third of their militia regiment as Minutemen. Other counties followed Worcester's lead, electing new militia officers and appointing Minutemen.

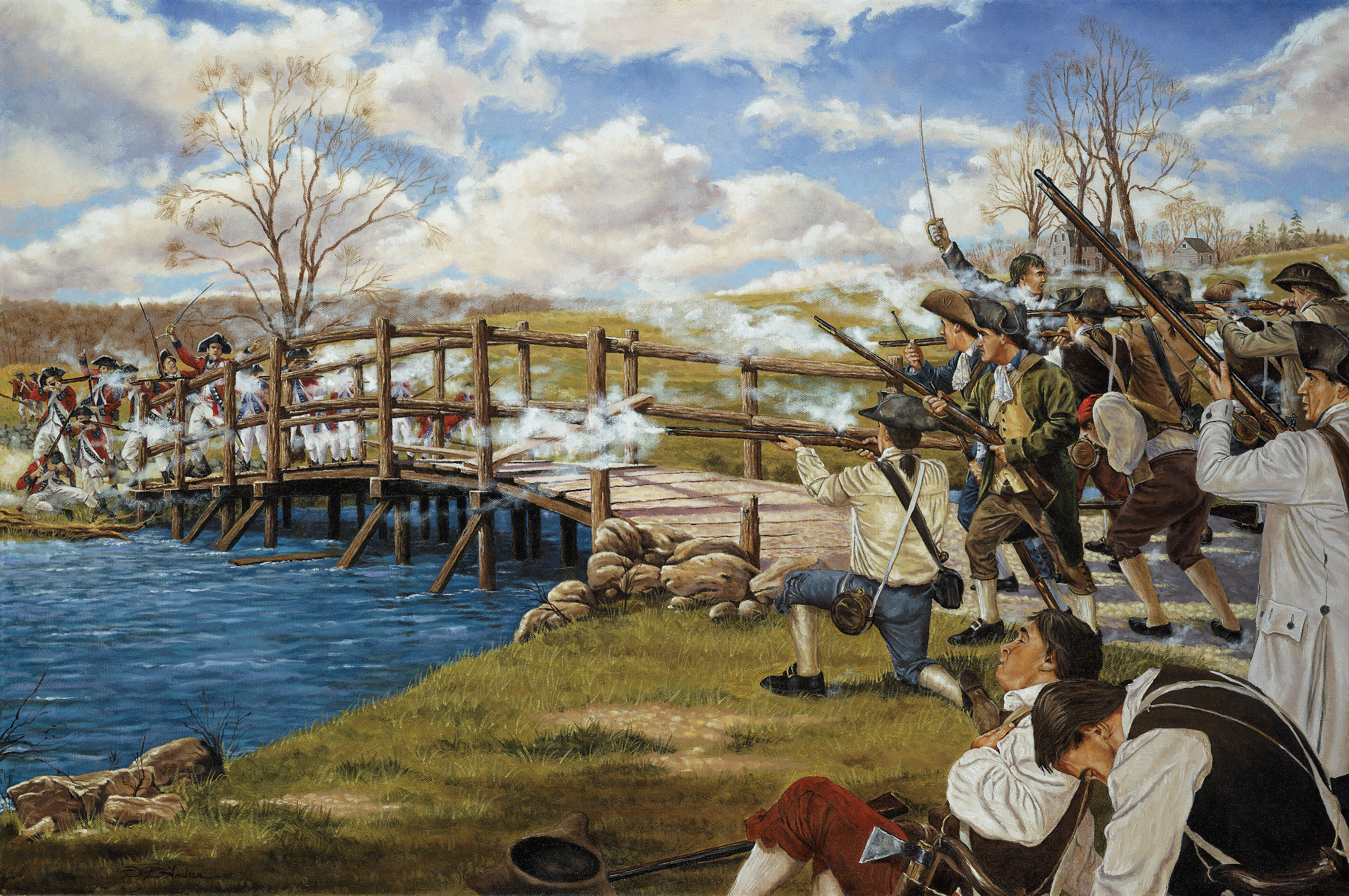
Minutemen during the Battles of Lexington and Concord, April 1775

The British practiced formations with their weapons, focusing on marching formations on the battlefield. It is a myth that the British and other professional armies of the 1700s did not practice marksmanship with their muskets; the military ammunition of the time was made for fast reloading and more than a dozen consecutive shots without cleaning. Accuracy of the musket was sacrificed for speed and repetitive loading.

The militia prepared with elaborate plans to alarm and respond to movements by the king's forces out of Boston. The frequent mustering of the minute companies also built unit cohesion and familiarity with live firing, which increased the minute companies' effectiveness. The royal authorities inadvertently gave the new Minuteman mobilization plans validation by several "show the flag" demonstrations by General Gage through 1774.

The royal authorities in Boston had seen these increasing numbers of militia appearing and thought that the militia would not interfere if they sent a sizable force to Concord to seize munitions and stores there (which they considered the King's property, since it was paid for to defend the colonies from the American Indian threat). The British officers were proven wrong. Shooting erupted at Lexington. There is still a debate as to whether it was a colonist or a British soldier who fired the first shot. The militia left the area, and the British moved on. The British then moved to Concord and faced a larger number of militia. The British were rapidly outnumbered at Concord, with the arrival of the slower moving militia; they had not counted on a long fight, and so had not brought additional ammunition beyond the standard issue in the soldiers' cartridge boxes. This then forced a strategic defeat on Colonel Smith, forcing him back to Boston.

A "running fight" began during the retreat. Militiamen knew the local countryside and were familiar with "skulking" or "Indian warfare". They used trees and other obstacles to cover themselves from British gunfire and pursuit by British soldiers, while the militia were firing and moving. This kept the British under sporadic fire, and caused them to exhaust their limited ammunition. Only the timely arrival of a relief column under Lord Percy prevented the annihilation or surrender of the original road column.

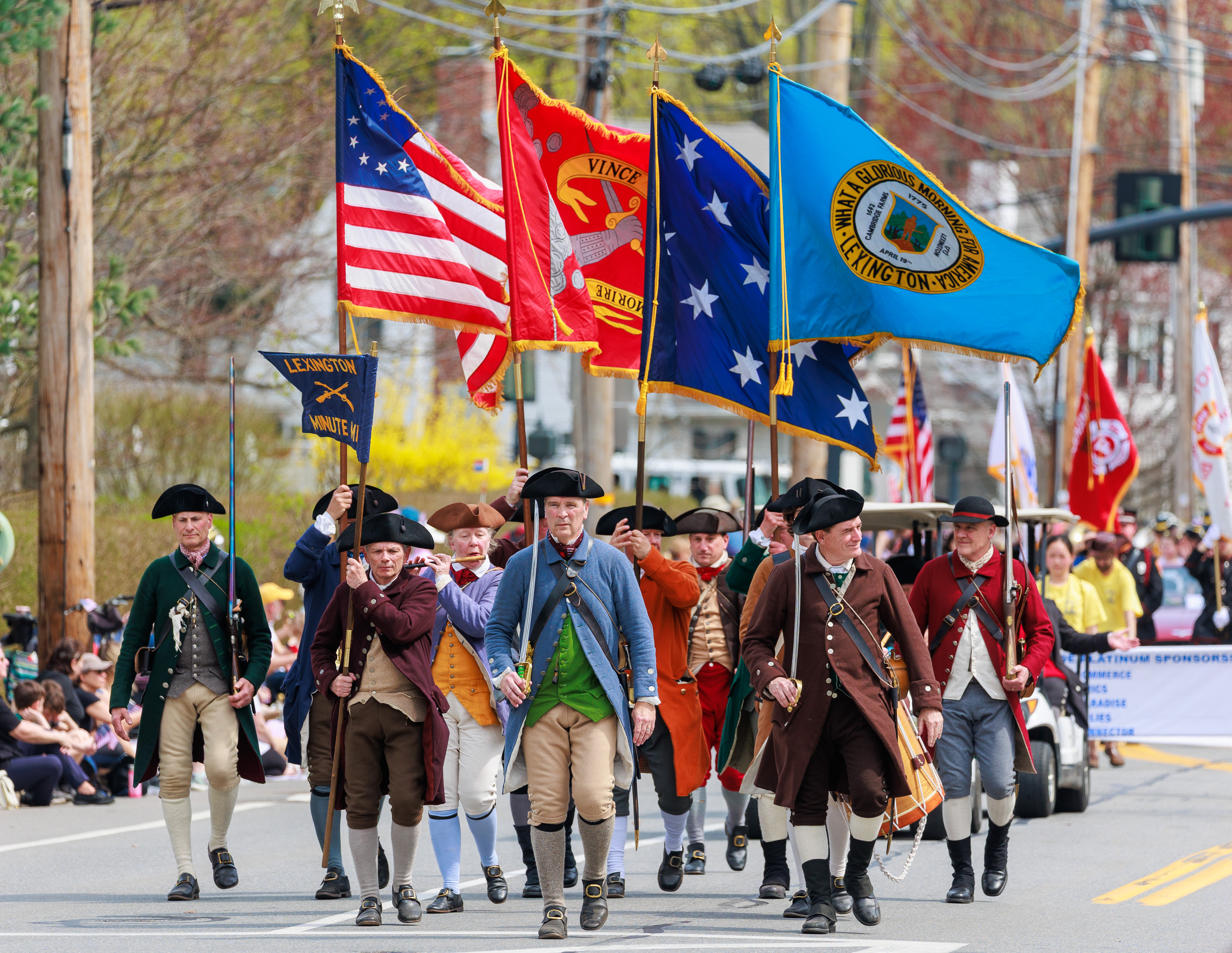
The Lexington Minute Men march in Lexington's 2025 Patriots' Day parade

=== Post Revolution ===
The organization was re-chartered ahead of an 1874 visit by Ulysses S. Grant. A charter granted May 5, 1910 by Governor Eben S. Draper permanently established the Minute Men (spelled as two words) as an independent, unattached military command in Massachusetts. In the 20th and 21st Centuries, the Minute Men serve as honor guards, march in parades (including eight Presidential inaugurations), and perform in re-enactments and living history programs.

== Equipment, training, and tactics ==
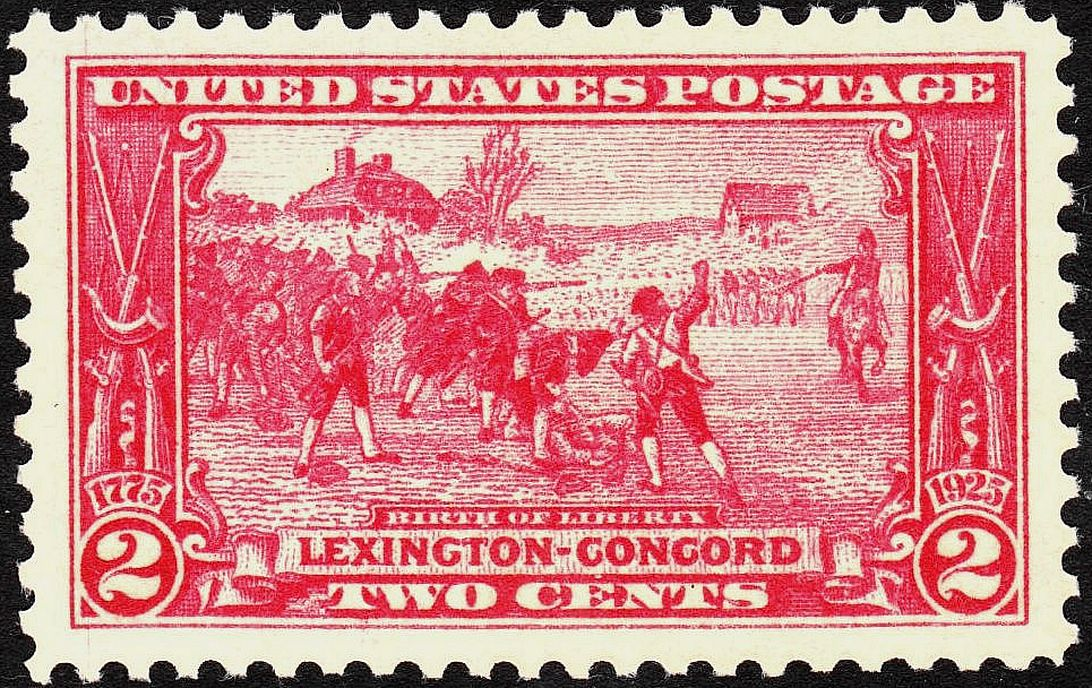

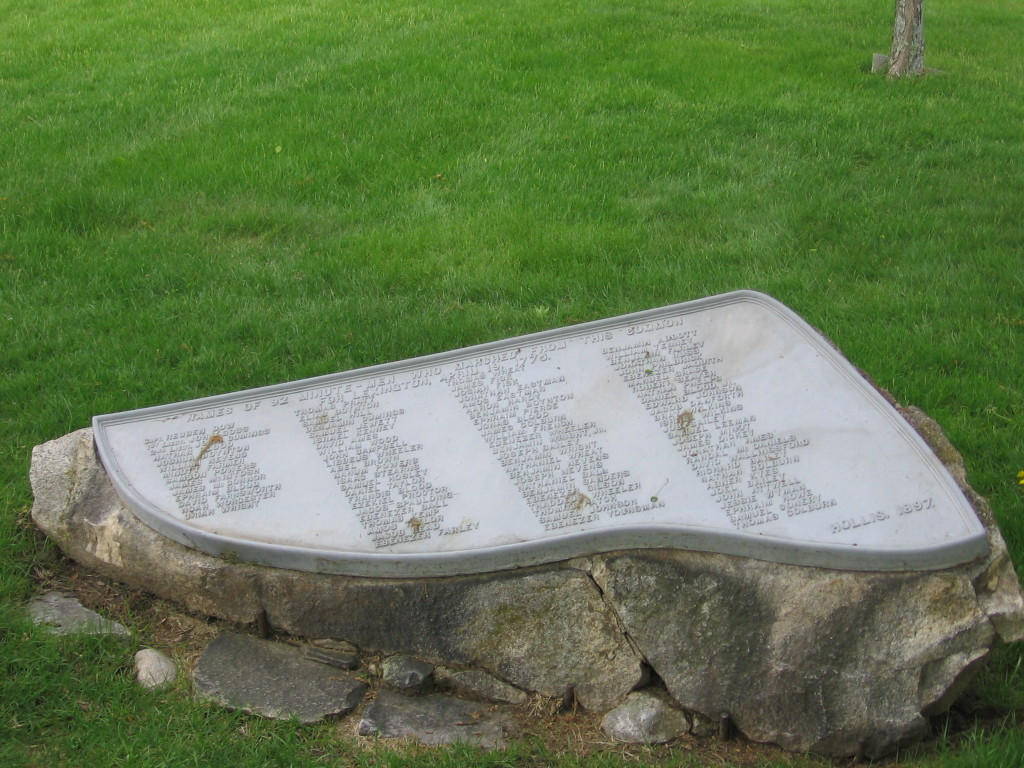
A Minutemen monument in Hollis, New Hampshire

While many Colonial militia units did not receive either arms or uniforms and were required to equip themselves, through colonial history both the Crown and local governments had issued arms and sometimes uniforms for provincial soldiers. Many simply wore their own farmers' or workmen's clothes and, in some cases, they wore cloth hunting frocks. Many farmers who owned separate guns such as fowling pieces, and sometimes rifles (though rarer in southern New England) would use them instead of the militia muskets if the muskets they bought for their duties were old or inoperative. These pieces gradually appeared in quantity, but neither fowling pieces nor rifles had bayonets. Some colonies purchased muskets, cartridge boxes, and bayonets from England, and maintained armories within the colony.

Muskets were usually shipped to Crown authorities, where they became provincial arms and were then sold to the towns or individuals, who would pay for them, as only the wealthy few could purchase arms directly from arms manufacturers. On several occasions, the Crown authorities had issued muskets as recruitment tools, such as for the 1709 Quebec expedition and the 1710 Port Royal expedition. The Crown often used such opportunities to clear their storehouses of outmoded and inferior weapons, but local Crown authorities were horrified and it became more usual for provincial troops to turn in muskets unless they bought them for use in the organized militia.

The Continental Army regulars received European-style military training later in the American Revolutionary War, but the militias did not get much of this. Like the militia organization itself, training day had a large administrative mission. Four times each year, militia companies were legally obligated to document all persons living within their areas of responsibility who qualified for the militia and a report on the number and condition of the units' weapons. Another mission was military training to prepare the provincial soldiers for combat and the nature of that combat. Since British doctrine usually counted on the militia as augmentees to the regular forces as skirmishers and irregular auxiliaries, the provincial soldiers were more frequently trained as irregulars or skirmishers rather than in the traditional dense lines and columns. When used in conjunction with continental regulars, the militia would frequently fire ragged irregular volleys from a forward skirmish line or from the flanks of the Continental Army, while Continental soldiers held the center.

Minutemen tended to get more training in line tactics and drill than the regular militia. Many Minutemen company commanders put their men through more training separate from the rest of the militia. Some also expended time, money, and effort to make sure their Minutemen were well-armed. For example, Captain Isaac Davis, who was a gunsmith in his civilian occupation, built a firing range on his farm to train his men in firing and drill. He also made sure that every man in his company had a good musket, cartridge box, canteen, and bayonet. This was one of the reasons that his company was in the lead of Colonel Barrett's Middlesex Minutemen regiment as the Rebels marched down to face the regulars at the Old North Bridge at the Battle of Concord. There were still some cases where men in the Minuteman companies had to be provided arms. In Concord's two Minutemen companies, fifteen of the 104 still needed to be provided with muskets from the town's arsenal.

Their experience suited irregular warfare. In the colonial agrarian society, many were familiar with hunting. The Indian Wars, and especially the recent French and Indian War, had given colonials valuable experience in irregular warfare and skirmishing, while British line companies (light infantry and grenadier companies were called flank companies and trained in skirmishing) troops were less familiar with this. The long rifle was also well suited to this role. The rifling (grooves inside the barrel) gave it a much greater range than the smoothbore musket, although it took much longer to load. Because of the lower rate of fire, rifles were not used by regular infantry, but were preferred for hunting. When performing as skirmishers, the militia could fire and fall back behind cover or behind other troops, before the British could get into range. The wilderness terrain that lay just beyond many colonial towns favored this style of combat and was very familiar to the local militia. In time, however, loyalists such as John Butler and Robert Rogers mustered equally capable irregular forces (Butler's Rangers and the Queen's Rangers, led by Englishman John Graves Simcoe). In addition, many British commanders learned from experience and effectively modified their light infantry tactics and battle dress to suit conditions in North America.

Through the remainder of the American Revolution, militias moved to adopting the minuteman model for rapid mobilization. With this rapid mustering of forces, the militia proved its value by augmenting the Continental Army on a temporary basis, occasionally leading to instances of numerical superiority. This was seen at the Battles of Hubbardton and Bennington in the north and at Camden and Cowpens in the south. Cowpens is notable in that Daniel Morgan used the militia's strengths and weaknesses skillfully to attain the double-envelopment of Tarleton's forces.

Historian M. L. Brown states that some of these men mastered the difficult handling of a rifle, though few became expert. Brown quotes Continental Army soldier Benjamin Thompson, who expressed the "common sentiment" at the time, which was that minutemen were notoriously poor marksmen with rifles: "Instead of being the best marksmen in the world and picking off every Regular that was to be seen, the continual firing which they kept up by the week and the month has had no other effect than to waste their ammunition and convince the King's troops that they are really not really so formidable."

There was a shortage of ammunition and supplies, and what they had were constantly being seized by British patrols. As a precaution, these items were often hidden or left behind by minutemen in fields or wooded areas. Other popular concealment methods were to hide items underneath floorboards in houses and barns.

== Legacy ==
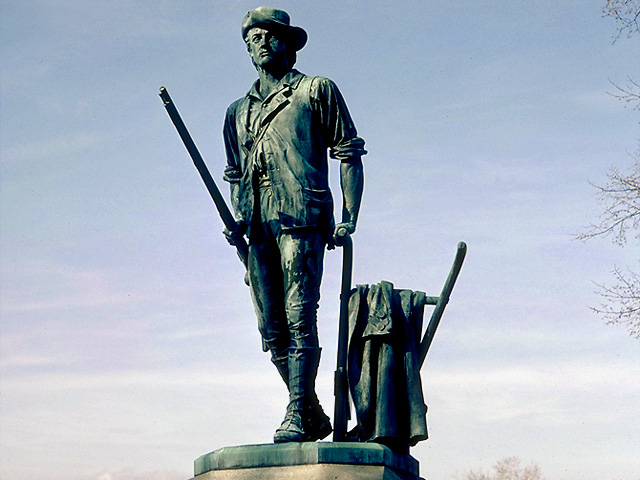
The Minute Man by Daniel Chester French, erected in 1875 in Concord, Massachusetts, depicting a typical Minuteman

The Minuteman model for militia mobilization married with a very professional, small standing army was the primary model for the United States' land forces up until 1916 with the establishment of the National Guard.

In commemoration of the centenary of the first engagement of the American Revolution, Daniel Chester French, in his first major commission, produced one of his best-known statues (along with the Lincoln Memorial), The Minute Man. Inscribed on the pedestal is the opening stanza of Ralph Waldo Emerson's 1837 "Concord Hymn" with the words, "Shot heard 'round the world". The statue's likeness is not based on Isaac Davis as is widely asserted, the captain of the Acton militia and first to be killed in Concord during the Battles of Lexington and Concord on April 19, 1775, but rather French used live models in the study of the anatomy and facial expression. The Minute Man statue is still the symbol of the National Guard, featured prominently on its seals. It was also the symbol of the former Boston and Maine Railroad.

Minutemen are portrayed in "Paul Revere's Ride", a poem by Henry Wadsworth Longfellow. Although historians criticize the work as being historically inaccurate, Longfellow understood the history and manipulated it for poetic effect.

The 1925 Lexington-Concord Sesquicentennial half dollar features a sculptural portrayal.

The athletic teams of the University of Massachusetts Amherst are nicknamed the Minutemen and Minutewomen. Until the 2003 rebranding featuring a modernized Sam the Minuteman, the logo featured the Concord Minute Man statue prominently.

The U.S. Air Force named the LGM-30 Intercontinental Ballistic Missile the "Minuteman", which was designed for rapid deployment in the event of a nuclear attack. The "Minuteman III" LGM-30G remains in service.

The U.S. Navy VR-55 Fleet Logistic Support Squadron is named "Minutemen" to highlight the rapid deployment and mobility nature of their mission.

One of the factions in Bethesda's 2015 video game Fallout 4, which is set in Massachusetts, is called the "Commonwealth Minutemen". The inspiration for their namesake comes from the requirement to be ready "at a minute's notice" to defend any settlement in danger.

Sinclair Lewis portrays Minute Men as paramilitary forces of Buzz Windrip's despotic government in his 1935 book It Can't Happen Here. In the book, the fascist-like militia is called "Minnie Mouses" by the populace.

In Alan Moore's Watchmen graphic novel the first masked vigilantes assembled are titled the Minutemen.

The Minutemen was a militant anti-communist organization in the early 1960s.

The Minuteman Civil Defense Corps was a militant anti-Mexican immigrants volunteer group formed in 2005.

The Minuteman Project is a 2004 organization that opposes Mexican immigration to US.

Minutemen are also featured in 2010 strategic video game Civilization V by Firaxis. They can only be recruited by the American Civilization and production is only available after researching the Gunpowder technology in the Renaissance era.
