= The Minute Man =

1874 sculpture by Daniel Chester French

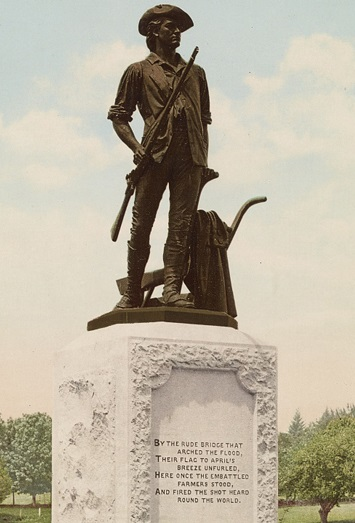
- Location: Minute Man National Historical Park, Concord, Massachusetts, US
- Coordinates: 42°28′8.1″N 71°21′4.6″W
- Designer: Daniel Chester French (sculptor); James Elliot Cabot (architect)
- Material: Bronze (sculpture); Granite (pedestal)
- Height: 7 feet (2.1 m)
- Opening date: April 19, 1875 (151 years ago)

The Minute Man (Note: The preponderance of the sources use the name The Minute Man (Eaton 2019, Howard 1906, p. 549, NPS 2020, Tolles 1999) or Minute Man (Holzer 2019, p. 349, Kowalski 2007, p. 50, and Richman 1972, p. 97) for the sculpture, but Minuteman (Eisen 1984 and Richardson 2015, p. 26) is also used.) is an 1874 sculpture by Daniel Chester French in Minute Man National Historical Park, located in Concord, Massachusetts, United States. It was created between 1871 and 1874 after extensive research, and was originally intended to be made of stone. The medium was switched to bronze and it was cast from ten Civil War-era cannons appropriated by Congress.

The statue depicts a minuteman stepping away from his plow to join the patriot forces at the Battle of Concord, at the start of the American Revolutionary War. The young man has an overcoat thrown over his plow, and has a musket in his hand. Nineteenth-century art historians noticed that the pose resembles that of the Apollo Belvedere. Until the late twentieth century, it was assumed that the pose was transposed from the earlier statue. Based on Daniel Chester French's journals, modern art historians have shown that the Apollo Belvedere was only one of several statues that were used in the research for The Minute Man.

The statue was unveiled in 1875 for the centennial of the Battle of Concord. It received critical acclaim and continues to be praised by commentators. The statue has been a suffragette symbol and a symbol of the United States National Guard and its components, the Army National Guard, and the Air National Guard, and depicted on coins such as the 1925 Lexington–Concord Sesquicentennial half dollar and the 2000 Massachusetts state quarter.

== Background ==
Minutemen or Minute Companies were a part of the militia of the Province of Massachusetts Bay. The name minutemen comes from the idea that they would be ready to fight with a minute's notice. The force was created in response to the Massachusetts militia's failure to respond to the Powder Alarm in September 1774. Unlike the general militia, which was made up of all able-bodied white men between 16 and 60, the two companies of minutemen were made up of young volunteers who were paid one shilling, eight pence for their time drilling three times a week. The other difference between the general militia and minutemen was how officers were appointed. In the general militia, officers were appointed by the governor as a political favor; officers of minutemen were elected by their peers. By February 1775, Concord, Massachusetts, had 104 minutemen in two companies.

=== Battles of Lexington and Concord ===
In 1775, the Massachusetts Provincial Congress designated Concord as the stockpile for patriot cannons, gunpowder, and ammunition. In response to the growing stockpile of arms, British Army General Thomas Gage sent spies to Concord to survey the preparations. Based on the reports from spies and instructions from Secretary of State for America William Legge, Earl of Dartmouth, Gage ordered a preemptive strike on Concord. At daybreak on April 19, 1775, six companies of grenadiers and light infantry under the command of major John Pitcairn met a group of 70 militiamen under the command of John Parker on the Lexington Common. The militiamen were alerted to the British advance by Paul Revere, William Dawes and Samuel Prescott, who traveled from Boston. It is unknown who fired the first shot of the Battle of Lexington, but after less than 30 minutes of fighting, eight militiamen were killed and nine were wounded. After dispersing the patriots, Pitcairn moved his troops on to Concord.

Based on alerts from Prescott and reports from Lexington, 150 minutemen from Concord and Lincoln mustered on the Concord Common under the command of James Barrett. After meeting the advancing British troops, the minutemen retreated to higher ground without firing a shot. Since the British troops had control of the town, they proceeded to search for and destroy the stockpiled supplies. The cannon, musket balls, and flour were all rendered unusable, but the gunpowder was removed before it could be seized. While the British were searching the town, the minutemen moved to the Old North Bridge and were reinforced by militiamen from other towns. At the bridge, 400 minutemen and militiamen repelled the British advance and forced them to retreat. Many of the minutemen who participated in the battle of Concord went home after the British retreated from the bridge. However, minutemen from other towns skirmished with the British troops during their march back to Boston.

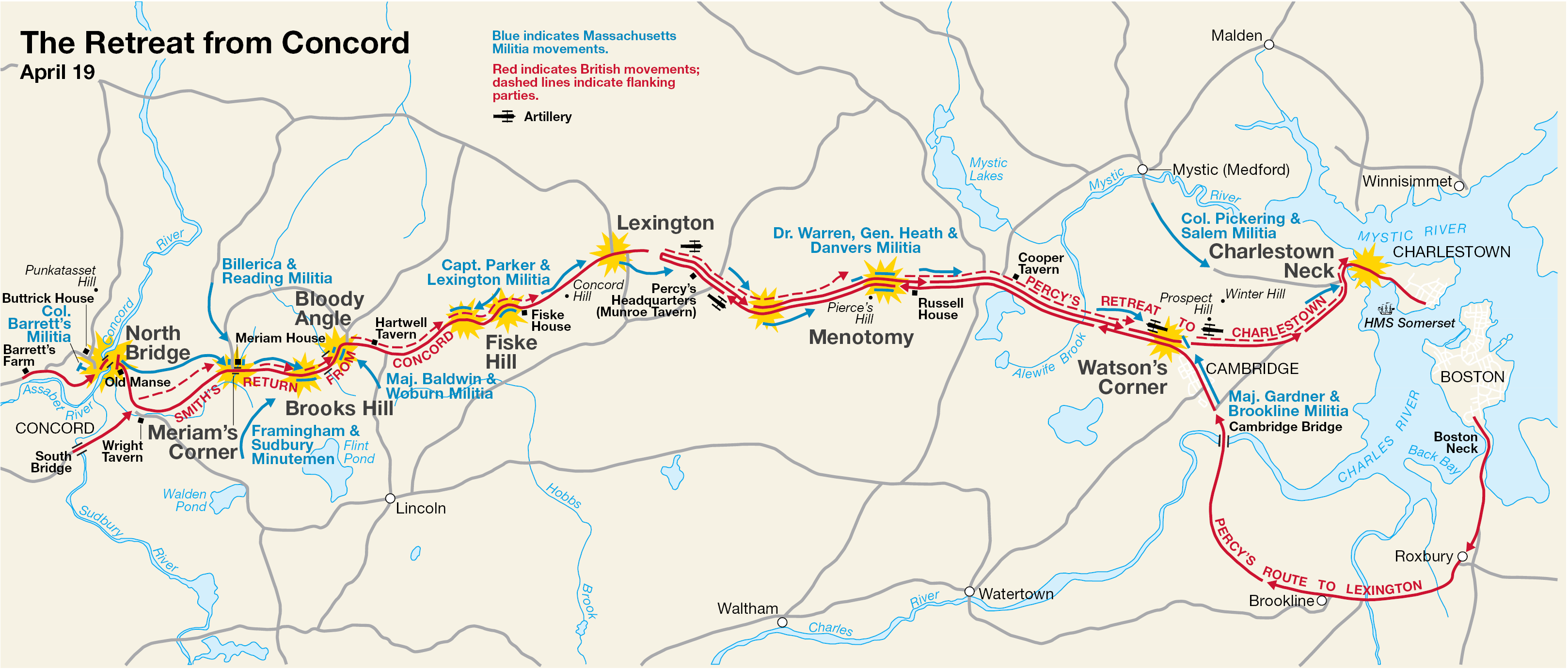
A National Park Service map showing the Battle of Concord and the British retreat

=== 1836 Battle monument ===
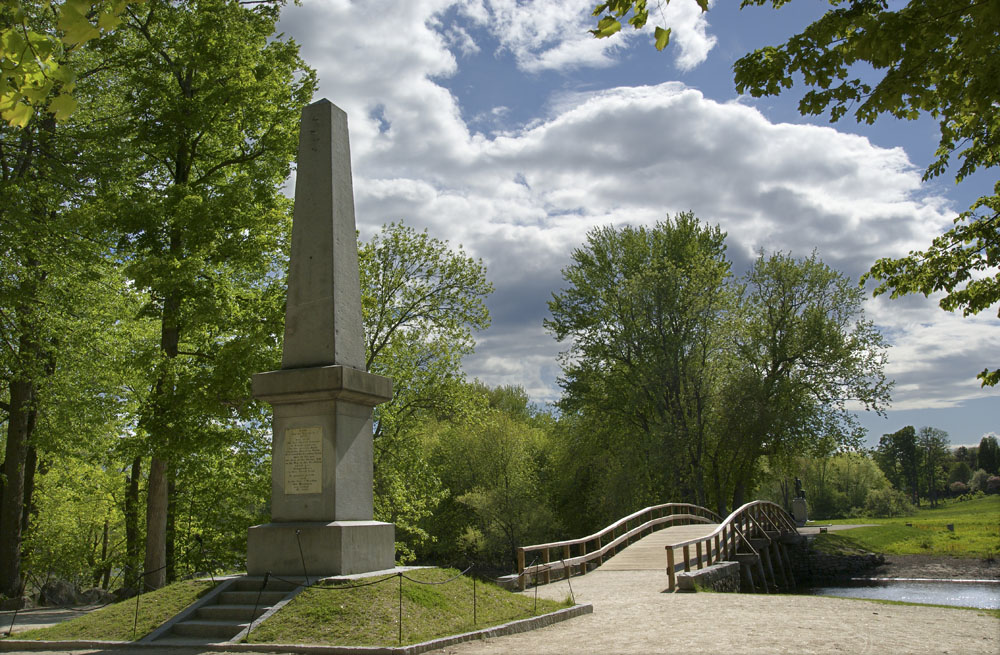
The 1836 obelisk with The Minute Man in the background on the other side of the Concord River

In 1825, the Bunker Hill Monument Association donated $500 (equivalent to $14,230 in 2025) to Concord to build a monument to the Battle of Concord. The original plan was to place the monument "near the town pump" in Concord. Due to disagreements within the town, nothing was done with the money until Ezra Ripley donated land for the monument near the Old North Bridge in 1835. After the donation, the town had Solomon Willard design a simple 25-foot-tall (7.6-meter) granite obelisk to commemorate the 60th anniversary of the Battle of Concord. The "Concord Hymn" was written by transcendentalist writer Ralph Waldo Emerson for the dedication of the monument in 1836. At the ceremony, it was sung to the tune of "Old Hundred".

To the dislike of Emerson, the obelisk stands on the bank of the river where the British stood during battle. The Minute Man was created for the centennial celebration of the battle in 1875. Unlike the earlier monument, it was to be placed on the bank where the Massachusetts militia stood.

== Creation and unveiling ==
The monument committee for The Minute Man—which consisted of George M. Brooks, John B. More, John S. Keyes, and Emerson—only considered Daniel Chester French because he was from Concord and his father, Henry F. French, was a prominent local lawyer and former judge. The statue was French's first full-size work; previously French had produced a bust of his father and one additional statue. In 1871, a year before he was formally commissioned, the committee chairman asked French to start working on the statue. Throughout the year, French sketched possible poses for the statue. That summer, he created a small clay "related figure" that was rejected by the committee. It is unknown what that statue looked like and it was not saved.

French researched The Minute Man by studying powder horns and buttons from the era. According to Harold Holzer, because French was a handsome man, "there would be a line of young women outside his studio ready to show him their alleged Colonial artifacts" to help him with his research. After a months-long search, a plow from the correct era was located to model for the statue. In 1873, his second clay model of the statue was accepted by the statue committee. The same year, the medium of the statue was changed from stone to bronze. The miniature version of the statue won a local art competition in September 1873, but the pose of the figure was deemed "awkwardly stiff" by critics. The pose of The Minute Man was made more natural in the enlargement process by working with models. By September 1874, the statue was completed and a plaster version of the clay statue was sent to Ames Manufacturing Works in Chicopee, Massachusetts. Because the town did not have the money to cast the statue in bronze, through a bill introduced by Ebenezer R. Hoar, the United States Congress appropriated ten Civil War-era cannons (Note: Sources disagree on whether the cannons were "confiscated" from the Confederate Army (Tolles 1999), left over from the Union Army (Holzer 2019, p. 49), or just from the era (Eaton 2019 and NPS 2020). The law that gave the cannons to Concord refers to them as "condemned brass cannons" (Boston National Historic Sites Commission 1959, p. 90).) to the project. The statue was cast with the metal from guns.

The statue was unveiled on April 19, 1875, during the centennial celebration of the Battle of Concord, in a ceremony attended by President Ulysses S. Grant and Ralph Waldo Emerson. French, however, left for Italy to further study sculpture in 1874 and was not in attendance. Holzer suggests that French avoided the celebration "in case the statue was panned" by contemporary critics. French's fears were unfounded and the statue was positively received by art critics and the public.

=== The Concord Minute Man of 1775 ===
French was commissioned by the town of Concord in 1889 to rework The Minute Man for the Yorktown-class gunboat USS Concord. The new statue, paid for by Congress, was titled The Concord Minute Man of 1775. (Note: Sources disagree on the year in the title of the reworked statue. Tolles (1999) uses the year 1875, while Kowalski (2007, p. 55) and Holzer (2019, p. 54) use 1775.) The reworked statue cleaned up some imperfections in the face of the original statue and incorporated elements of Beaux-Arts. French made the movement of the new statue more fluid and natural. It was completed in 1890 and installed on the gunboat in 1891. A copy of the statue was also carried by the Omaha-class cruiser USS Concord in the 1940s.

== Composition ==
=== Statue ===
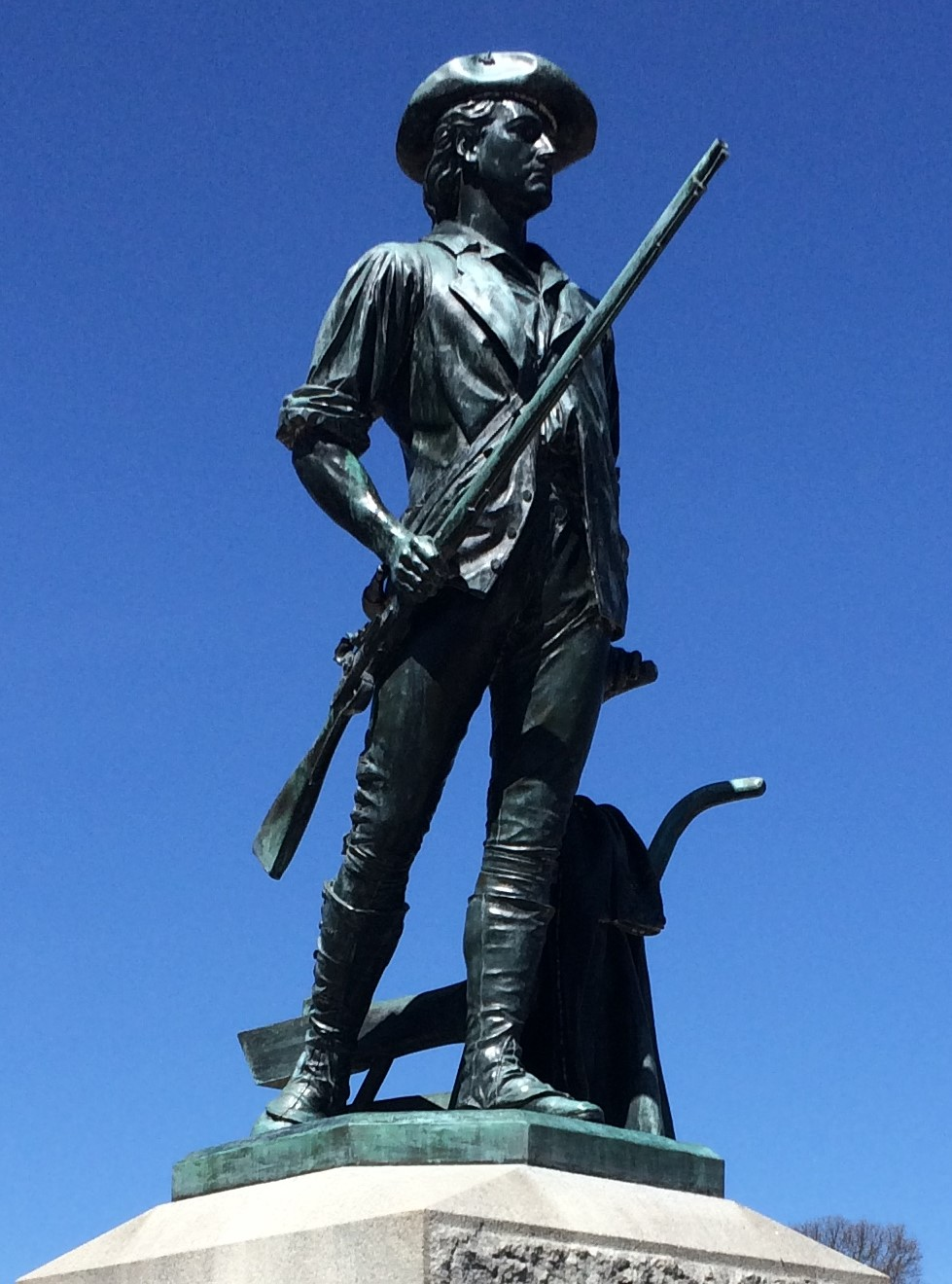
Closeup of The Minute Man without its pedestal

The statue is 7 feet (2.1 meters) tall and depicts a minuteman at the Battle of Concord. It is, perhaps, a portrait of Isaac Davis, (Note: The claim that The Minute Man depicts Davis first appeared in Robbins (1945) and can be found in sources such as Linenthal (1991, p. 30) and Stout (1999). Other sources about Daniel Chester French, such as Creston (1947), Richman (1972), and Holzer (2019), are silent on the subject. Contemporaneous sources such as Hoar, Emerson & Walcott (1876) also do not mention the connection between Davis and the statue.) an officer who died in the battle. The farmer-turned-soldier is shown trading his plow for a musket (Note: Sources disagree on the type of firearm in the hand of The Minute Man. Richman (1972, p. 101) and Creston (1947, p. 68) refer to it as a musket while Tolles (1999) calls it a rifle.) and stepping away from his private life toward the impending battle. The sleeves of his coat and shirt are rolled up; the minuteman's overcoat is draped over the plow. A powder horn, mistakenly, sits on the man's back instead of on his hip where it can be used. His face is alert while his eyes are transfixed on the battle into which he is ready to march. On his head sits a wide-brimmed hat that has been pinned on the right side.

The pose of the soldier has been compared to the pose of the Apollo Belvedere. Nineteenth- and twentieth-century art critics, such as Lorado Taft and H. C. Howard, have suggested that the pose was directly copied from the Roman sculpture. Howard in particular trivializes the sculpture as "little more than an Americanized rendition of the Apollo Belvedere". Modern scholarship, working with French's journals, disagrees that the pose is a copy while acknowledging that French used a variety of plaster casts of classical sculptures, including the Apollo Belvedere, as inspiration when creating The Minute Man.

=== Pedestal ===
The Minute Man was intended to be placed on a local boulder by the town of Concord. At the insistence of French and his father, the town allowed for the design of a stone pedestal. Several architects submitted designs to the town, including French's brother, but the competition was won by James Elliot Cabot. The resulting design is a simple granite pedestal that is 7.5 feet (2.3 meters) tall and 4.5 feet (1.4 meters) wide with inscriptions in two sides. On the front, it is inscribed with the first stanza of Ralph Waldo Emerson's "Concord Hymn". The date of the battle and the year of the centennial are on the rear. Cabot's design is nearly identical to French's final pedestal design. Throughout the creation of The Minute Man, French sketched and built a variety of potential pedestals.

Beneath the pedestal is a copper time capsule from 1875 that contains items from past celebrations of the battle, maps, and photographs of both the sculpture and sculptor. In 1975, a second time capsule was placed beneath the pedestal that included Girl Scouts USA pins, the United States Bicentennial's flag, and a cassette tape.

== Reception ==
The Minute Man is highly regarded by art historians and critics. Rudyard Kipling came "very near to choking" when he saw the statue and battlefield during his 1892 tour of the United States. Anna Seaton-Schmidt referred to it as "the most inspiring of our soldier monuments" in her 1922 biography of French in The American Magazine of Art. The Boston National Historic Sites Commission claimed the statue "perfectly personifies the American Patriot" in their 1959 interim report. Michael Richman, the 1971–1972 Samuel H. Kress Fellow, calls it a "masterwork in nineteenth-century American sculpture". Chris Bergeron from The MetroWest Daily News describes The Minute Man as "naturalistic detail imbued with an idealistic effect". Harold Holzer describes the statue as representative of French's style of "naturalism, a great feeling of humanity, and connection to the subject".

Louisa May Alcott, writing for Woman's Journal, commented on the lack of place for women in its unveiling ceremony. Alcott and other suffragettes appropriated the statue as a symbol of their struggle for voting rights, and the suffragettes made pilgrimages to the statue in the 1880s.

=== Government usage ===
The Minute Man was widely used by the US government to evoke the idea of the citizen-soldier, commemorate the Battle of Concord, and serve as a symbol for Massachusetts. The statue appears on the seal of the United States National Guard and its components, the Army National Guard, and the Air National Guard. In 1925, the United States Post Office Department released a five-cent stamp depicting the statue and verses from "Concord Hymn". The United States Treasury has used the statue on both war bonds and savings bonds. Workplaces and schools with a 90% war bond participation rate were authorized to fly a flag featuring The Minute Man during World War II. The statue has been depicted on United States coins twice. It appears on the obverse of the 1925 Lexington–Concord Sesquicentennial half dollar, and on the reverse of the 2000 Massachusetts state quarter along with an outline of the state.

Government uses of The Minute Man
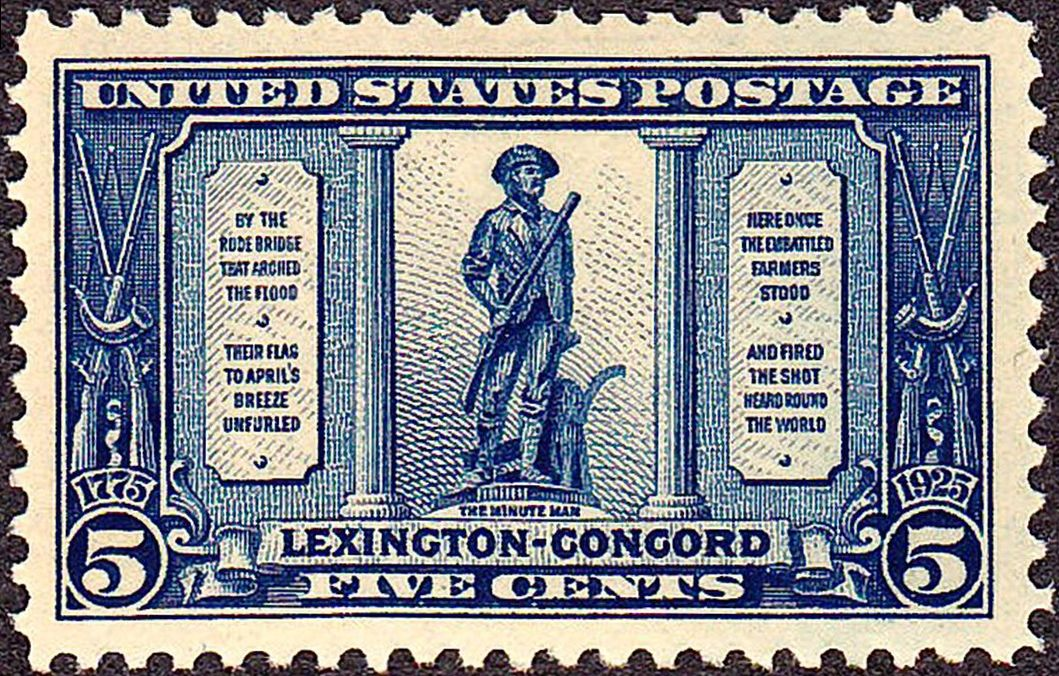
The five-cent stamp issued by the United States Post Office Department in 1925

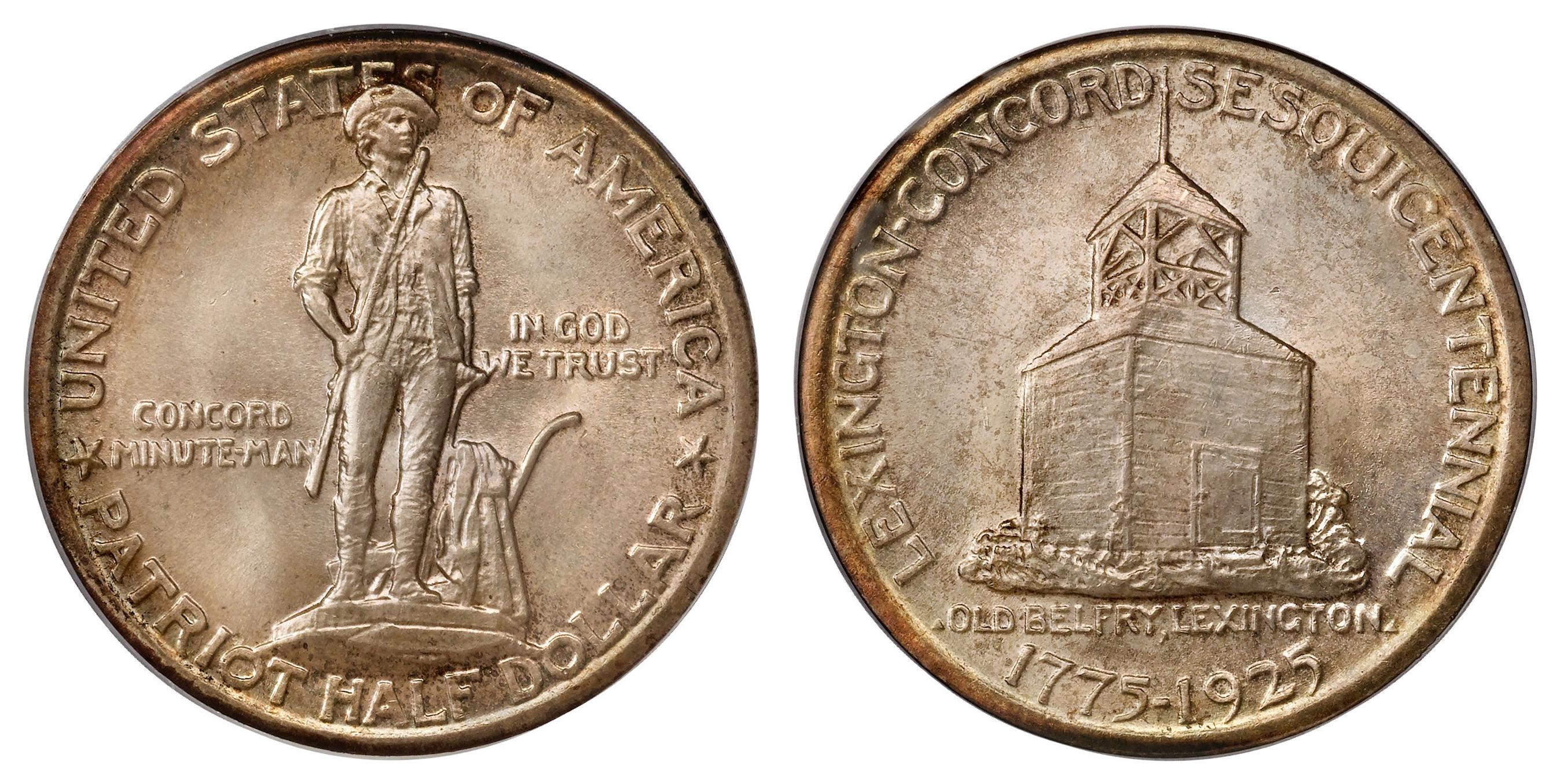
The 1925 Lexington–Concord Sesquicentennial half dollar showing The Minute Man on the obverse

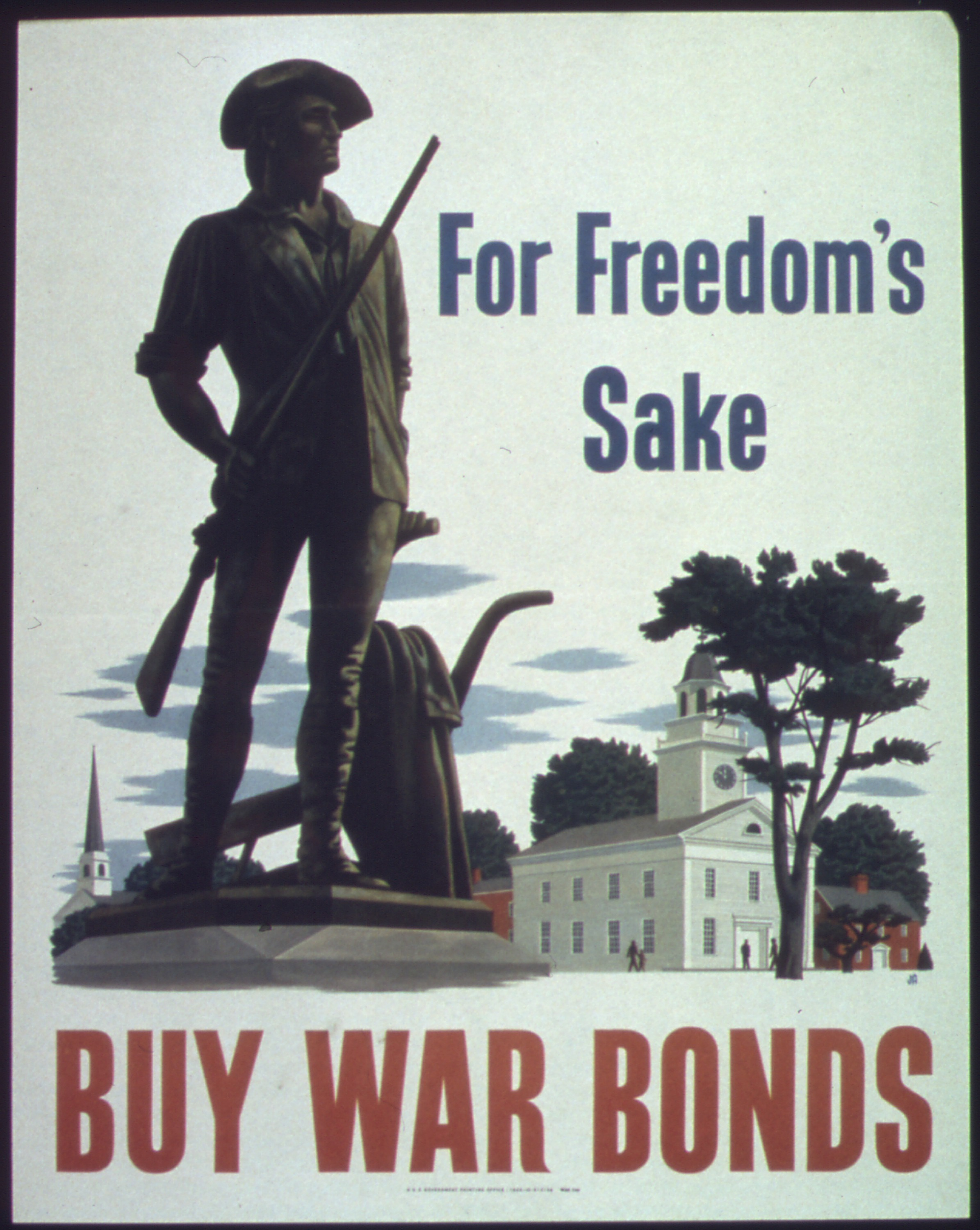
A 1940s propaganda poster from the United States Office of War Information encouraging the sale of war bonds

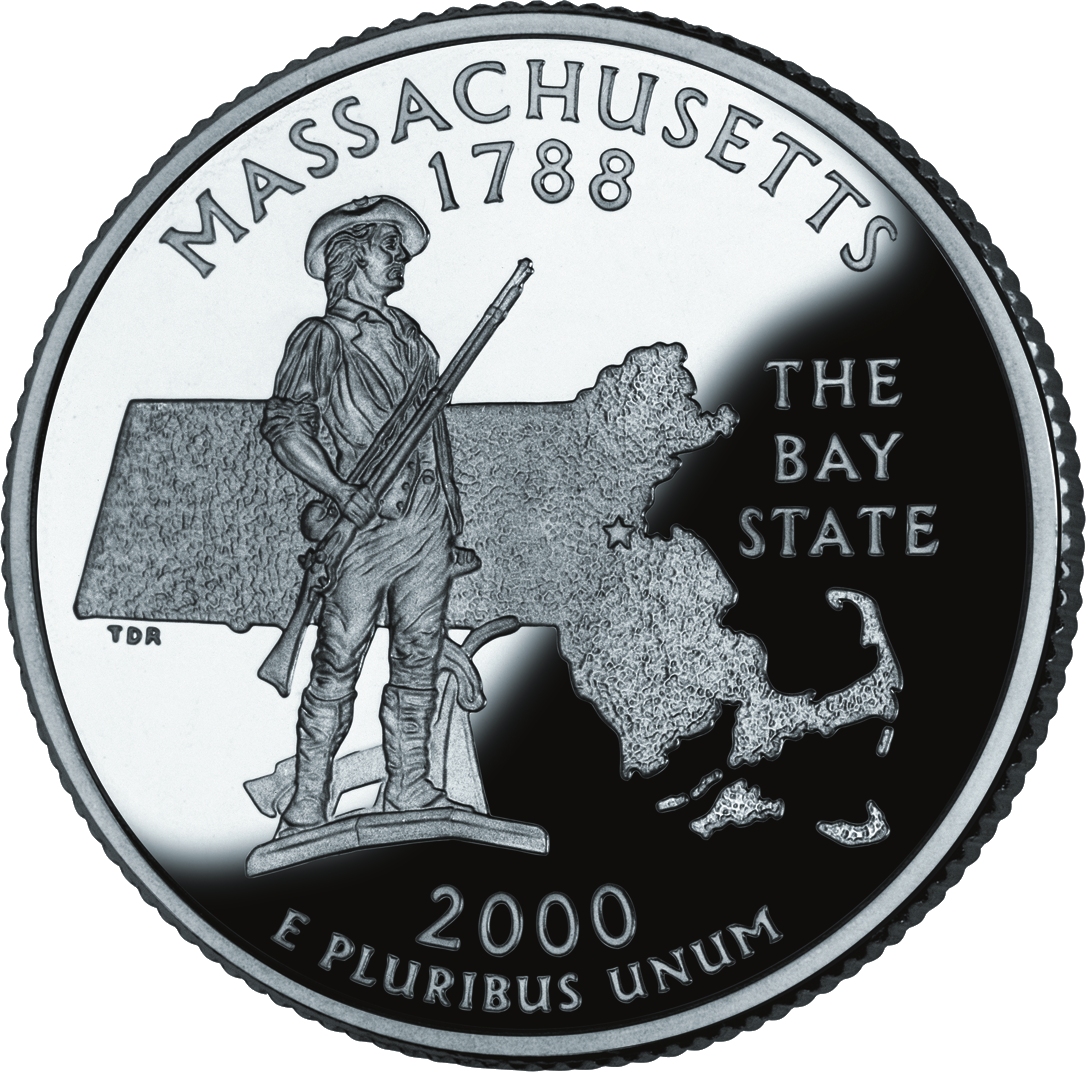
The reverse of the 2000 Massachusetts state quarter showing a map of the state and the statue

The shield of the Air National Guard

== See also ==
- Public sculptures by Daniel Chester French
