= Isaac Davis (soldier) =

American gunsmith (1745–1775)

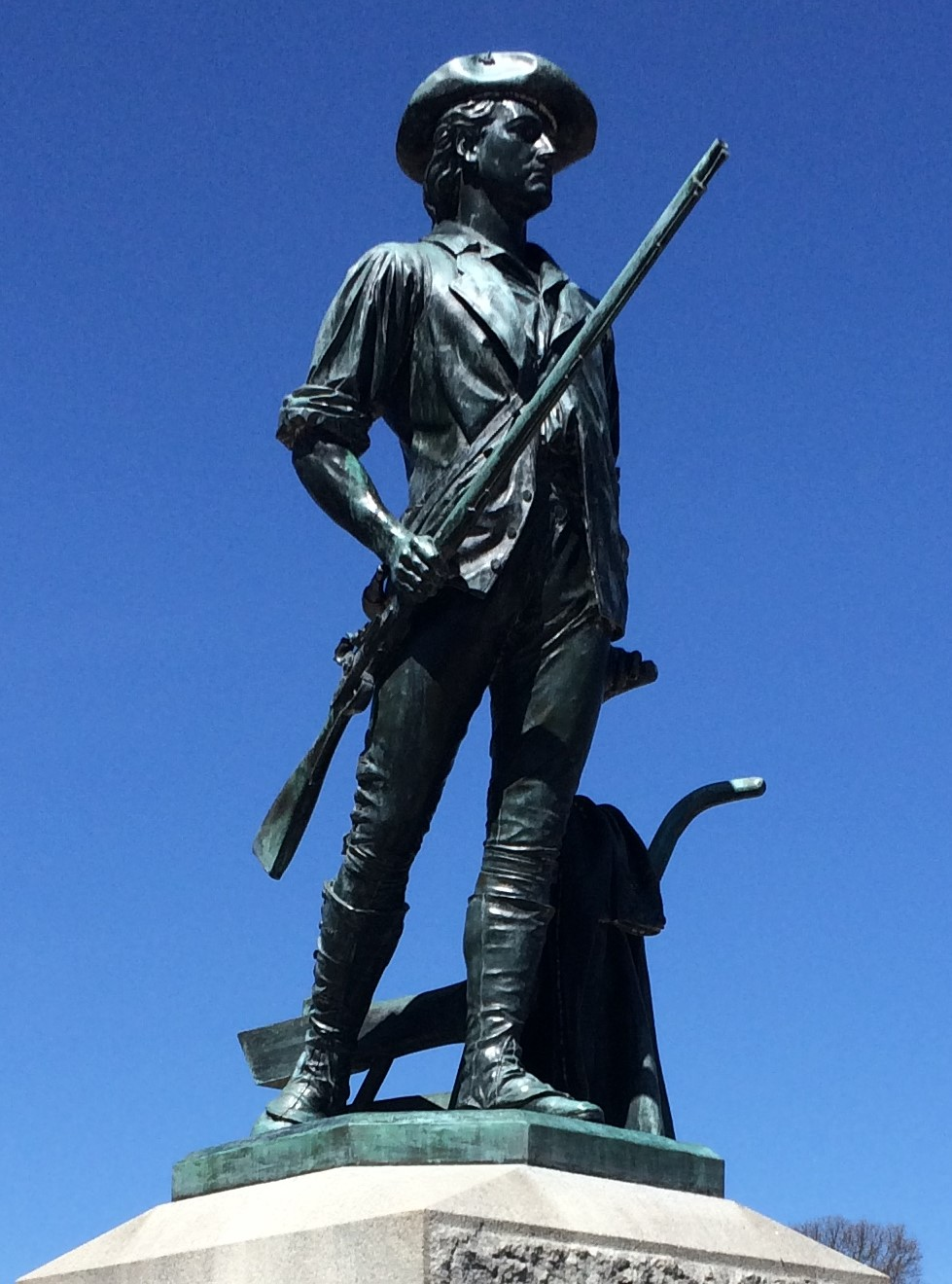
- The Minute Man (1875) by Daniel Chester French, depicting Davis
- Born: February 23, 1745; Acton, Massachusetts Bay
- Died: April 19, 1775 (aged 30); Concord, Massachusetts Bay
- Military career
- Allegiance: Provisional government of Massachusetts
- Branch: Militia
- Service years: 1775
- Rank: Captain
- Conflicts: American Revolutionary War; Battle of Concord †
- Other work: Gunsmith

Isaac Davis (February 23, 1745 – April 19, 1775) was an American gunsmith and militia officer who commanded a company of Minutemen from Acton, Massachusetts, during the first battle of the American Revolutionary War. In the months leading up to the Revolution, Davis set unusually high standards for his company in terms of equipment, training, and preparedness. His company was selected to lead the advance on the British Regulars during the Battle of Concord because his men were entirely outfitted with bayonets. During the American advance on the British at the Old North Bridge, Davis was among the first killed and was the first American officer to die in the Revolutionary War.

Davis is memorialized through the Isaac Davis Monument on the Acton Town Common. He was also the inspiration behind The Minute Man (1875), the sculpture at the Old North Bridge by Daniel Chester French. The sculpture, which French attempted to model after Davis using photographs of Davis's descendants, is now an iconic national symbol.

== Biography ==
=== Early life and family ===
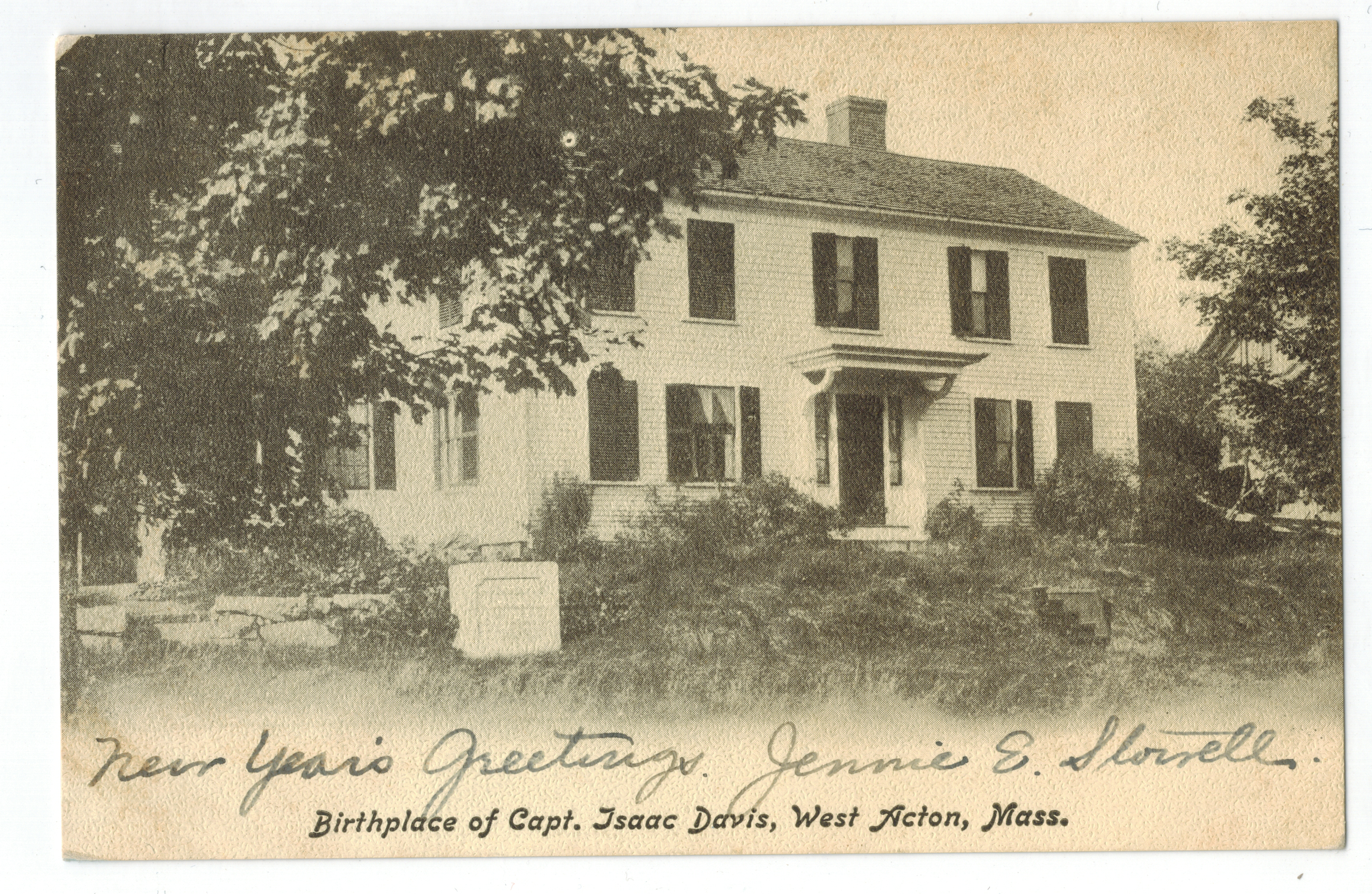
Isaac Davis' birth house in Acton, Massachusetts in 1905 (left) and 2015 (right)

Davis was born February 23, 1745, in the village of West Acton to Ezekial Davis (b. 1717) and Mary (nee Gibson) Davis (1725–1773). He married Hannah Brown (born 1746) on October 24, 1764. They had four children—two boys and two girls.

=== Preparations for war ===
During the early 1770s, many inhabitants of the Province of Massachusetts Bay protested taxation policies established by British Parliament. These protests eventually resulted in the military occupation of the provincial capital of Boston, Massachusetts, which, consequently caused further unrest. In September 1774, the military governor, General Thomas Gage, dissolved the Massachusetts General Court, placing the province under martial law. Citizens of Massachusetts formed an extra-legal Massachusetts Provincial Congress to govern the province outside of the rule of the King. In October 1774, the Massachusetts Provincial Congress recommended that each town establish a company of Minutemen—specially trained militia who could be ready at short notice in the event that the British Regulars in Boston attempted any warlike movements.

In November 1774, Acton formed a company of Minutemen, and Davis was elected captain. He was determined that his company be as well-equipped as the British soldiers. Most provincial Minuteman companies, unlike professional soldiers, were not equipped with bayonets for use in close combat and they typically re-loaded using powder horns, a slow method more suited to hunting than to battle. Davis employed his skills as a gunsmith to outfit nearly every man in his company with a bayonet and saw that his men were supplied with cartridge boxes, allowing his company to re-load as quickly as the British. Finally, Davis emphasized marksmanship, training his company on an improvised shooting range behind his house. These high standards in terms of equipment and training made the Acton company one of the best prepared in Massachusetts.

According to tradition, Davis was a superstitious man who believed he had seen numerous omens that indicated that he would die if forced into battle. In 1851, Rev. James Woodbury, Acton's representative to the Massachusetts General Court, delivered a speech about Davis to the House of Representatives. During this speech, Woodbury described an incident that allegedly took place a few days before the Battle of Concord in which Davis and his family returned home to find an owl perched on Davis's musket. According to Woodbury, "It was an ill omen, a bad sign. The sober conclusion was that the first time that Davis went into battle, he would lose his life."

=== Battle of Concord ===
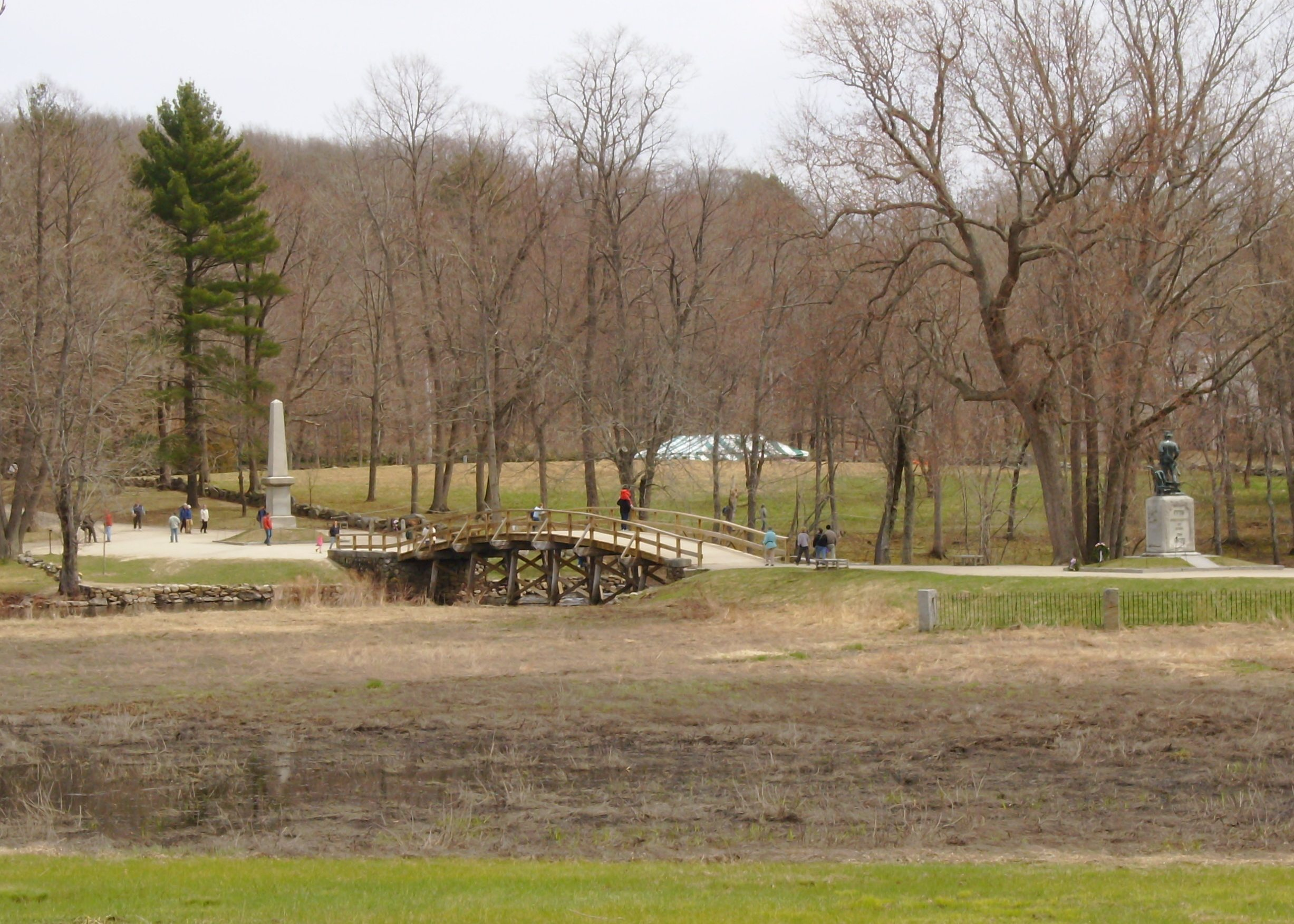
Old North Bridge in Concord. The British position was on the left bank of the river and the provincial position to the right.

During the early spring of 1775, Gage planned an expedition to confiscate a large stockpile of gunpowder and weapons kept by the provincials in Concord, Massachusetts. On April 15, he issued orders to hand-picked companies of British Regulars in Boston, relieving them from their usual duties. Concluding that a British movement was imminent, Paul Revere, a messenger for the provincial Sons of Liberty, was sent to Concord on April 16 to warn the inhabitants. Most of the supplies were removed from Concord, and the Minuteman companies were on alert days before the British marched from Boston.

On the night of April 18, 1775, Gage dispatched approximately 700 British Regulars under the command of Lieutenant Colonel Francis Smith. The Sons of Liberty in Boston were convinced that the British troops would also attempt to capture the provincial leaders, John Hancock and Samuel Adams, who were in Lexington, Massachusetts. Messengers Paul Revere and William Dawes therefore rode again on the night of April 18 to warn Hancock and Adams that the soldiers were marching from Boston. In Lexington, the British force encountered resistance from the Lexington militia, and a skirmish ensued on Lexington Green; eight provincials were killed, and one British soldier was wounded. Following the action on Lexington Green, the British marched on to Concord.

Word of the British movement reached Acton just before dawn on April 19, most likely delivered by Dr. Samuel Prescott, a resident of Concord and one of the Sons of Liberty. As the alarm spread, the Acton Minutemen began to gather at Davis's home. While waiting for others to arrive, the men made paper cartridges and some powdered their hair with flour so as to appear more like gentlemen when they met the British in battle. As the Minutemen prepared, Davis's wife noticed that he seemed especially somber and said very little. As some of his men joked about getting shot at by a British soldier, Davis rebuked them, reminding them that some of them would soon be killed.

Davis formed up his company and ordered them to march at about 7 a.m. According to his wife and other witnesses, shortly after stepping off, Davis ordered his company to halt, then returned to his front door to tell his wife, "Take good care of the children." Soon after crossing into Concord, the Acton company passed the farm of Colonel James Barrett who commanded the provincial troops in Concord that morning. A small detachment of British soldiers were searching Barrett's farm for supplies, and Davis considered attacking them. His orders, however, were to muster with the rest of the provincial militia and Minutemen near the Old North Bridge by the Concord River. He then diverted his company off the road, avoiding the British at Barrett's farm and marching past a tavern belonging to a Widow Brown. A boy named Charles Handley, who lived at Widow Brown's Tavern, saw Davis's company pass the tavern. He recalled many years later that a fifer and drummer played a song called "The White Cockade", a reference to the white ribbon worn on their bonnets by Scots revolutionaries during The '45. Tradition persists that this was Davis's favorite marching song, but there is little evidence to support this notion. There is also a tradition that the Acton musicians played the White Cockade later when Davis's company led the advance on the British at the Old North Bridge, although this too is not supported by primary source accounts.

Davis's company reached the area of the Old North Bridge at approximately 9 a.m. Several other companies of militia and Minutemen, consisting of about 500 men from Concord, Lincoln, and Bedford, had already gathered on a small hill overlooking the bridge. Approximately 100 British Regulars occupied the bridge. Shortly after Davis arrived, Barrett called a council of the officers present to determine whether or not to attack the Regulars at the bridge. In Concord, the majority of the British force was searching for supplies, but they found little. When they decided to burn some wooden gun carriages they discovered, the provincials near the Old North Bridge saw the smoke and thought the British were burning the town. Barrett then made the decision to attack the soldiers holding the bridge.

Davis's company had taken their designated position at the left of the provincial line. This would have placed the Acton company in the rear of the attack when the line advanced. The company in the lead would have been Captain David Brown's company from Concord. When Barrett asked Brown if he would lead the attack, Brown responded that he would rather not. Knowing that Davis's company was well equipped with bayonets and cartridge boxes, Barrett asked Davis if his company would lead the advance. Several slight variations of Davis's response have been recorded. His response is most often given as, "I have not a man that is afraid to go." Following Barrett's orders, Davis then moved his company to the right of the line. Around 10:30, the provincials faced to the right and advanced on the Old North Bridge in a column of two men abreast. At the head of the column was Davis, Major John Buttrick of Concord, and Lt. Col. John Robinson of Westford. Barrett remained behind on the hill, cautioning his men as they marched by him not to fire first. The British at the bridge, watching the provincials approach, were surprised to see, as one soldier later said, that they "advanced with the greatest regularity".

When the provincials were within about 75 yards of the bridge, the Regulars fired a few warning shots. Luther Blanchard, the fifer from Acton, was hit and wounded by one of these warning shots. The British then fired a disorganized volley. Isaac Davis was shot through the heart. Private Abner Hosmer of Acton was also killed in this volley. Seeing these casualties, Buttrick commanded, "Fire, fellow soldiers, for God's sake fire!" and the provincials returned fire, causing the British to immediately retreat back to Concord.

== Legacy ==
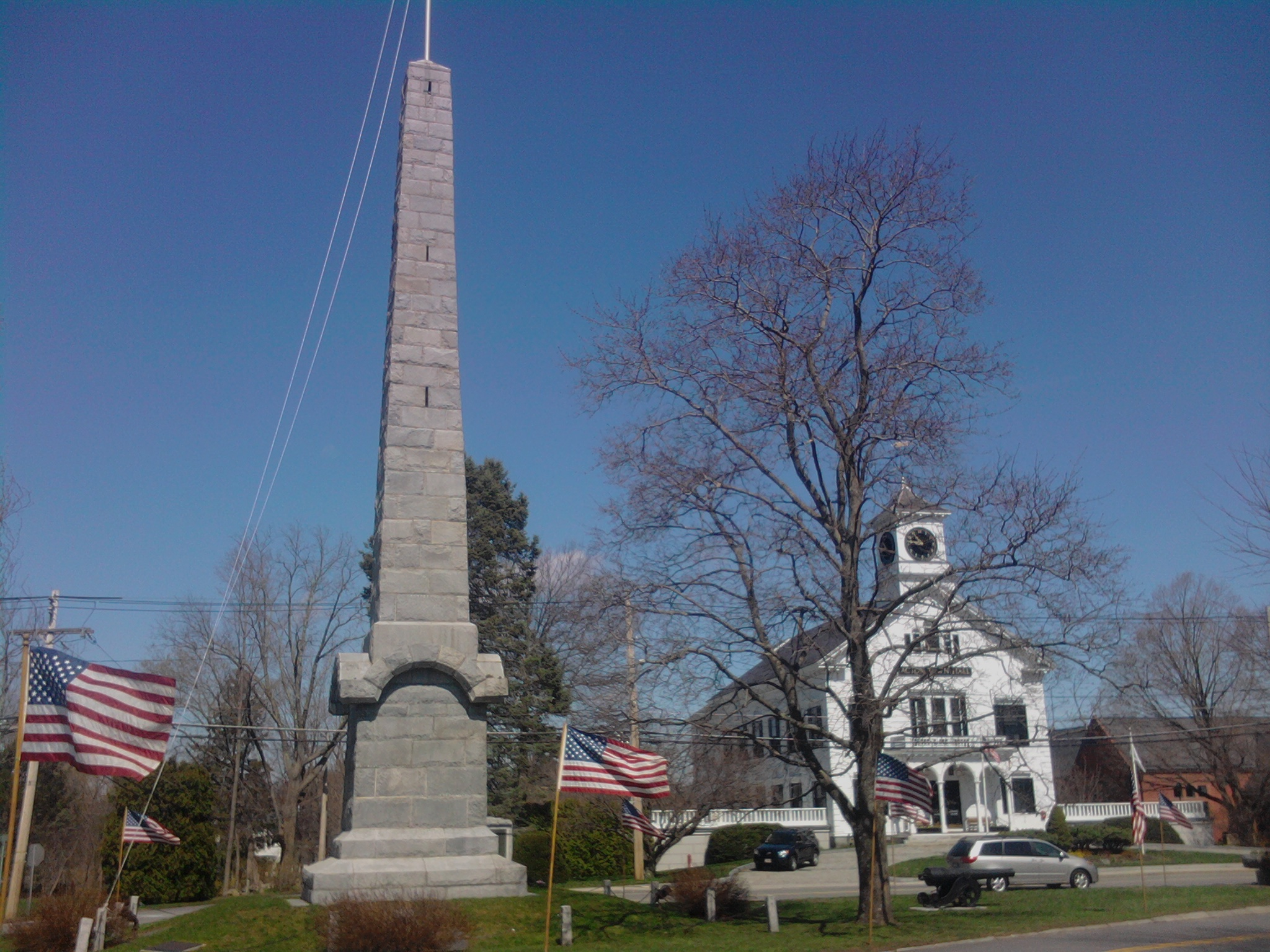
Isaac Davis Monument, gravesite of Abner Hosmer and Isaac Davis on the Acton Town Common

In February 1851, shortly after the 75th anniversary of the Battle of Concord, Rev. James Woodbury of Acton petitioned the Massachusetts General Court for funds to build a large monument to Isaac Davis in Acton. After the legislature appropriated $2,000 for the project, the 75-foot tall stone obelisk was completed that fall and dedicated on October 29, 1851. The remains of Davis, Hosmer, and James Hayward (an Acton soldier who was killed in Lexington later in the battle) were moved and re-interred beneath the monument. At the base of the monument is a stone brought from the vicinity of the Old North Bridge in Concord which is, according to an inscription, the stone upon which Davis's head fell when he was killed.

In 1875, on the centennial of the Battle of Concord, a statue called The Minute Man was placed on the approximate site of Isaac Davis's death. The statue was the first public work of sculptor Daniel Chester French, best known for his 1920 statue, "Abraham Lincoln", in the Lincoln Memorial. Although commissioned to sculpt a generic provincial soldier, French was inspired by the story of Isaac Davis and modeled the facial features of his statue after photographs of Isaac Davis's descendants. Davis's plow, which is currently on display in Acton's Town Hall, was used as the model for the plow on the statue.

On the base of the statue is inscribed the first stanza of Ralph Waldo Emerson's Concord Hymn written in 1836:

By the rude bridge that arched the flood,

Their flag to April's breeze unfurled,
Here once the embattled farmers stood
And fired the shot heard round the world.

National Guard logo

Representing Davis, the statue of "The Minute Man" with a musket in one hand and the other resting on a plow remains an iconic symbol, and can be found on the Massachusetts state quarter, corporate logos, and the seal of the National Guard of the United States.

The route of the Acton Minutemen is retraced every Patriots' Day in April by today's recreated company of Acton Minutemen, and by citizens and visitors. Now called the Isaac Davis Trail, the seven mile route from Acton to Concord traverses roads still in use as well as woodland trails. The path was established in 1957 by a group of Acton Boy Scouts who researched the historic route, cleared the portions of the path no longer in use, and placed markers. The trail was added to the National Register of Historic Places in 1972.
