= Concord Hymn =

Poem by Ralph Waldo Emerson

- Hymn: Sung at the Completion of the Concord Monument, April 19, 1836
- by Ralph Waldo Emerson
- Written: 1836
- Language: English
- Subject: Battles of Lexington and Concord
- Form: Hymn / Occasional poem
- Meter: Iambic tetrameter
- Rhyme scheme: aabb (Alternative: Quatrain stanza structure)
- Publication date: July 4, 1837 (Broadside)
- Lines: 16

Full text
- Concord Hymn at Wikisource

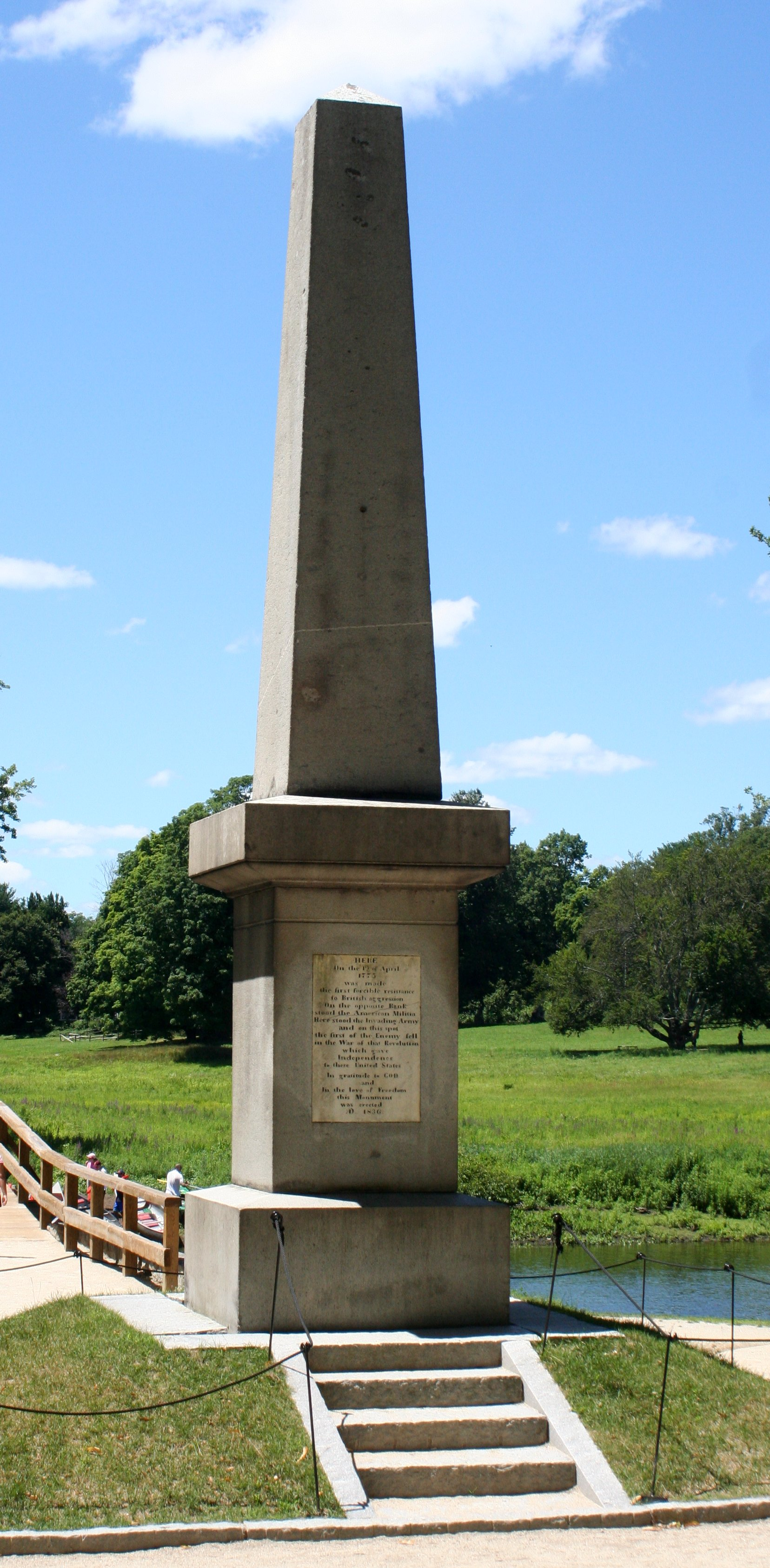
Emerson's "Concord Hymn" was written for the dedication of the memorial of the Battle of Concord.

"Concord Hymn" (original title "Hymn: Sung at the Completion of the Concord Monument, April 19, 1836") is a poem by Ralph Waldo Emerson written for the 1837 dedication of an obelisk monument in Concord, Massachusetts, commemorating the battles of Lexington and Concord, a series of battles and skirmishes on April 19, 1775 which sparked the American Revolutionary War. The poem was the origin of the phrase "shot heard round the world".

== History ==
In October 1834, Emerson went to live with his step-grandfather Ezra Ripley in Concord, at what was later named The Old Manse— less than a hundred paces from the spot where the battle took place. In 1835, he purchased a home on the Cambridge and Concord Turnpike and quickly became one of Concord's leading citizens. That same year he was asked to give a public lecture commemorating the town's 200th anniversary.

The "Concord Hymn" was written at the request of the Battle Monument Committee. At Concord's Independence Day celebration on July 4, 1837, it was first read, then sung as a hymn by a local choir using the then-familiar tune "Old Hundredth".

The poem elevates the battle above a simple event, setting Concord as the spiritual center of the American nation, removes specific details about the battle itself, and exalts a general spirit of revolution and freedom— a spirit Emerson hoped would outlive those who fought in the battle. One source of the hymn's power may be Emerson's personal ties to the subject: his grandfather William Emerson Sr., witnessed the battle at the North Bridge while living at the Old Manse.

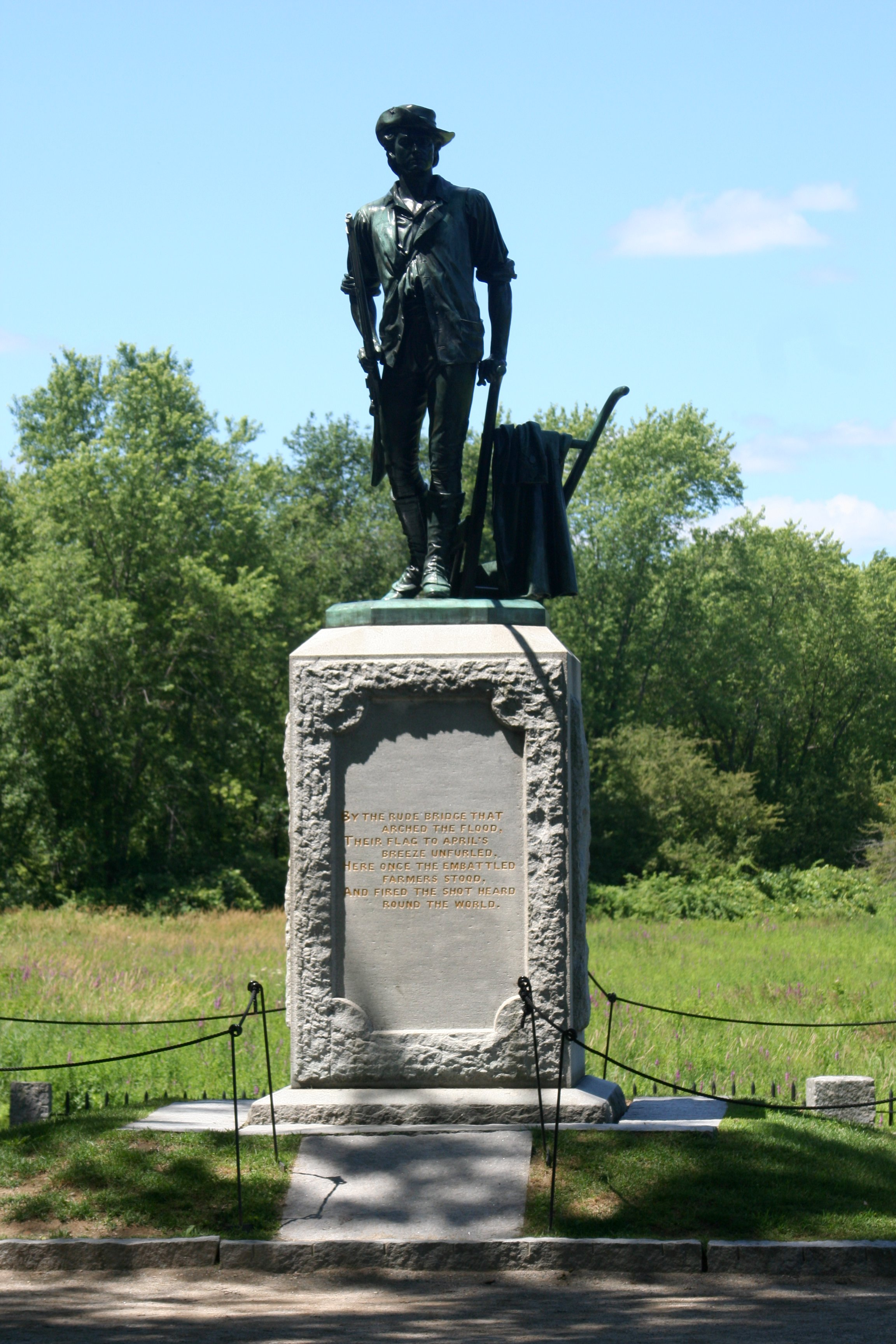
The first stanza of "Concord Hymn" is inscribed at the base of The Minute Man, an 1874 statue by Daniel Chester French.

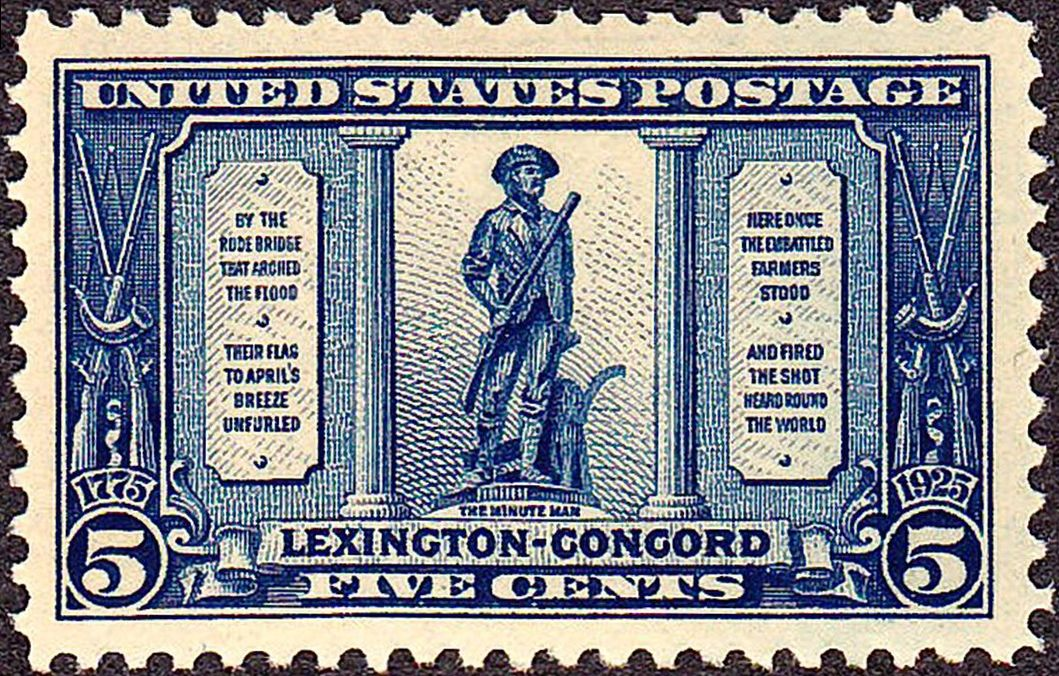
The poem's first stanza was also featured on a 1925 U.S. 5-cent stamp commemorating the 150th anniversary of the battle.

Emerson's poem was widely published in newspaper accounts of the dedication. In contrast there is no record of Congressman Samuel Hoar's speech that day. The poem, originally printed as a broadside for distribution at the monument's dedication, was republished as the last poem in Emerson's first edition of Poems, the American edition of which was published in December 1846 (the book, however, was dated 1847). In that edition the poem appeared with the three line title "HYMN: / SUNG AT THE COMPLETION OF THE CONCORD MONUMENT, / April 19, 1836." Emerson apparently confused the date of the 1837 dedication a decade earlier, July 4, Independence Day, with the anniversary of the battle, April 19, Patriots' Day and the inscription on the obelisk mentions that it was erected in 1836.

Emerson's line "the shot heard round the world" is a fixture in the lore of the American Revolution, and the opening stanza is inscribed beneath the Daniel Chester French The Minute Man statue dedicated (along with a replica of the Old North Bridge) at the 1875 commemoration of the original battle. "Concord Hymn" established Emerson as a poet; he was previously known as a lecturer and essayist. Emerson biographer Robert Richardson notes the phrase has since become the most famous line he ever wrote. Concord's centennial celebration of Emerson's birth in 1903 ended with a singing of the hymn.

== Text ==
By the rude bridge that arched the flood,
Their flag to April’s breeze unfurled,
Here once the embattled farmers stood,
And fired the shot heard round the world.

The foe long since in silence slept;
Alike the conqueror silent sleeps;
And Time the ruined bridge has swept
Down the dark stream which seaward creeps.

On this green bank, by this soft stream,
We set to-day a votive stone;
That memory may their deed redeem,
When, like our sires, our sons are gone.

Spirit, that made those heroes dare
To die, and leave their children free,
Bid Time and Nature gently spare
The shaft we raise to them and thee.

(Note: This version is from The Complete Works of Ralph Waldo Emerson (1904), edited by Edward Waldo Emerson, who noted, "From a copy of this hymn as first printed on slips for distribution among the Concord people at the celebration of the completion of the monument on the battle-ground, I note the differences from the poem here given as finally revised by Mr. Emerson in the Selected Poems.")
