= 1951 New York Giants (MLB) season =

1951 New York Giants
- National League champions
- League: National League
- Ballpark: Polo Grounds
- City: New York City
- Record: 98–59 (.624)
- League place: 1st
- Owners: Horace Stoneham
- General managers: Chub Feeney
- Managers: Leo Durocher
- Television: WPIX (Russ Hodges, Ernie Harwell)
- Radio: WMCA (Russ Hodges, Ernie Harwell)

The 1951 New York Giants season was the franchise's 69th season and saw the Giants finish the regular season in a tie for first place in the National League with a record of 96 wins and 58 losses. This prompted a best-of-three National League tiebreaker against the Brooklyn Dodgers, which the Giants won in three games, clinched by Bobby Thomson's walk-off home run, a moment immortalized as the Shot Heard 'Round the World. The Giants, however, lost the World Series to the New York Yankees in six games.

== Offseason ==
=== Spring training ===
The Giants had trained in Phoenix since 1947. In 1951, the team swapped spring training sites with the New York Yankees, with the Yankees moving to Phoenix and the Giants training at Al Lang Field in St. Petersburg, Florida. It was a one-year arrangement; the Giants returned to Phoenix in 1952.

=== Notable transactions ===
- December 4, 1950: Tom Acker was drafted from the Giants by the Buffalo Bisons in the 1950 minor league draft.
- Prior to 1951 season (exact date unknown)
  - Dom Zanni was signed as an amateur free agent by the Giants.
  - Don Taussig was acquired by the Giants from the New York Yankees.

== Regular season ==
Center fielder Willie Mays made his major league debut in a game against the Philadelphia Phillies on May 25. He went on to win the 1951 National League Rookie of the Year Award.

Outfielder Monte Irvin led the league in RBI with 121. Five players on the 1951 Giants team went on to become major league managers. Eddie Stanky (1952), Bill Rigney (1956), Alvin Dark (1961), Wes Westrum (1965) and Whitey Lockman (1972).

In June, future NFL Hall of Famer Andy Robustelli was offered a tryout with the New York Giants. The Giants offered Robustelli a $400 contract to play with Class AA Knoxville.

=== Season standings ===
National League
Team	W	L	Pct.	GB	Home	Road
New York Giants	98	59	.624	—	50‍–‍28	48‍–‍31
Brooklyn Dodgers	97	60	.618	1	49‍–‍29	48‍–‍31
St. Louis Cardinals	81	73	.526	15½	44‍–‍34	37‍–‍39
Boston Braves	76	78	.494	20½	42‍–‍35	34‍–‍43
Philadelphia Phillies	73	81	.474	23½	38‍–‍39	35‍–‍42
Cincinnati Reds	68	86	.442	28½	35‍–‍42	33‍–‍44
Pittsburgh Pirates	64	90	.416	32½	32‍–‍45	32‍–‍45
Chicago Cubs	62	92	.403	34½	32‍–‍45	30‍–‍47

=== Record vs. opponents ===
1951 National League record Sources:
Team	BSN	BRO	CHC	CIN	NYG	PHI	PIT	STL
Boston	—	10–12–1	10–12	10–12	8–14	12–10	13–9	13–9
Brooklyn	12–10–1	—	14–8	14–8	14–11	15–7	10–12	18–4
Chicago	12–10	8–14	—	10–12	7–15	7–15	9–13	9–13–1
Cincinnati	12–10	8–14	12–10	—	5–17	11–11	12–10–1	8–14
New York	14–8	11–14	15–7	17–5	—	16–6	14–8	11–11
Philadelphia	10–12	7–15	15–7	11–11	6–16	—	15–7	9–13
Pittsburgh	9–13	12–10	13–9	10–12–1	8–14	7–15	—	5–17
St. Louis	9–13	4–18	13–9–1	14–8	11–11	13–9	17–5	—

=== The comeback ===
After a slow start, the team went 50–12 over their final 62 games to complete one of the biggest comebacks in major league history. Longstanding rumors that the Giants engaged in systematic sign stealing during the second half of the 1951 season were confirmed in 2001. Several players told The Wall Street Journal that beginning on July 20, the team used a telescope, manned by coach Herman Franks in the Giants clubhouse behind center field, to steal the finger signals of those opposing catchers who left their signs unprotected. Stolen signs were relayed to the Giants dugout via a buzzer wire. Joshua Prager, the author of the Journal article, outlined the evidence in greater detail in a 2008 book. He noted that sign stealing, then as now, is not specifically forbidden by MLB rules and, moral issues aside, "has been a part of baseball since its inception."

=== The playoff ===
At the end of the season, they were tied with their arch-rivals, the Dodgers, for first place in the League, prompting a three-game playoff for the pennant. The Giants had home field advantage for the series.

==== Game 1 ====
The first game of the series was played at Ebbets Field. Jim Hearn started for the Giants against Ralph Branca for the Dodgers. Monte Irvin and Bobby Thomson homered for the Giants, powering them to a 3–1 win. Andy Pafko hit a home run for the only Dodgers run.

==== Game 2 ====
The series moved to the Polo Grounds for game two. Sheldon Jones took the mound for the Giants against the Dodgers' Clem Labine. Jones was pulled in the third inning despite giving up just two runs, one of which was a Jackie Robinson homer. However, the game went downhill from there, as the Dodgers abused relievers George Spencer and Al Corwin for eight more runs, while Labine pitched a six-hit shutout for a 10–0 shellacking. Pafko hit his second homer of the series, while Gil Hodges and Rube Walker added home runs of their own.

==== Game 3 ====
Game three was also held at the Polo Grounds. Sal "The Barber" Maglie was on the mound for New York, while Brooklyn called on Don Newcombe. After Maglie walked two batters in the top of the first, Jackie Robinson singled home the game's first run. The score remained 1–0 until the bottom of the seventh. In that inning, Monte Irvin led off with a double for the Giants. He was bunted over to third, and scored on a sacrifice fly by Bobby Thomson.

In the top of the eighth, the Dodgers came roaring back with three runs off Maglie. A pair of singles, a wild pitch, and two more singles made the score 4–1 Dodgers. Newcombe sat down the Giants in order in the bottom of the eighth, while Larry Jansen did the same in relief of Maglie.

===== The "shot heard 'round the world" =====
In the bottom of the ninth, Alvin Dark led off with a single, and Don Mueller followed with another. After Monte Irvin popped out to first base, Whitey Lockman lined a double to left-center field, scoring Dark and putting Mueller on third. Dodger manager Chuck Dressen summoned game 1 starter Ralph Branca in to relieve Newcombe, despite having had only one day of rest. On his second pitch, Bobby Thomson drove a pitch to deep left field for a walk-off home run to clinch the pennant for the Giants. This home run, hit at 3:58 p.m. EST on October 3, 1951, came to be known as the "Shot Heard 'Round the World".

The phrase shot heard 'round the world is from a classic poem by Ralph Waldo Emerson, originally used to refer to the first clash of the American Revolutionary War and since used to apply to other dramatic moments, military and otherwise. In the case of Thomson's home run, it was particularly apt as U.S. servicemen fighting in the Korean War listened to the radio broadcast of the game.

Thomson's homer, and the Giants' victory, are also sometimes known as the Miracle of Coogan's Bluff.

===== Line score =====
Polo Grounds

Team	1	2	3	4	5	6	7	8	9	R	H	E
Brooklyn	1	0	0	0	0	0	0	3	0	**4**	**8**	**0**
**New York**	0	0	0	0	0	0	1	0	4	**5**	**8**	**0**
WP: Larry Jansen (23–11) LP: Ralph Branca (13–12)

=== Roster ===
1951 New York Giants
**Roster**
**Pitchers**: 39 George Bamberger; 38 Roger Bowman; 39 Al Corwin; 44 Al Gettel; 38 Red Hardy; 21 Jim Hearn; 46 Larry Jansen; 37 Sheldon Jones; 32 Monte Kennedy; 38 Alex Konikowski; 31 Dave Koslo; 33 Jack Kramer; 35 Sal Maglie; 30 George Spencer)	**Catchers**: 5 Ray Noble; 9 Wes Westrum; 7 Sal Yvars; **Infielders**: 19 Al Dark; 25 Whitey Lockman; 17 Jack Lohrke; 18 Bill Rigney; 12 Eddie Stanky; 16 Hank Thompson; 14 Davey Williams; 15 Artie Wilson	**Outfielders**: 26 Clint Hartung; 20 Monte Irvin; 27 Spider Jorgensen; 24 Jack Maguire; 14,24 Willie Mays; 22 Don Mueller; 23 Bobby Thomson; **Other batters**: 27 Earl Rapp; 10 Hank Schenz	**Manager**: 2 Leo Durocher; **Coaches**: 6 Fred Fitzsimmons; 3 Herman Franks; 1 Frank Shellenback

=== Game log ===
1951 Game Log: 98–59 (Home 50–28, Road 48–31)
April: 3–12 (Home 0–5, Road 3–7)

#	Date	Opponent	Score	Win	Loss	Save	Stadium	Attendance	Record	Streak
1	April 17	@ Braves	4–0	**Jansen** (1–0)	Bickford (0–1)	–	Braves Field	6,081	1–0	W1
2	April 18	@ Braves	5–8	Wilson (1–0)	**Gettel** (0–1)	–	Braves Field	2,784	1–1	L1
3	April 19	@ Braves	4–2	**Hearn** (1–0)	Spahn (0–1)	–	Braves Field	12,682	2–1	W1
4	April 19	@ Braves	12–13	Nichols (1–0)	**Koslo** (0–1)	–	Braves Field	12,682	2–2	L1
5	April 20	Dodgers	3–7	Newcombe (1–0)	**Jones** (0–1)	–	Polo Grounds	30,870	2–3	L2
6	April 21	Dodgers	3–7	Branca (1–0)	**Jansen** (1–1)	–	Polo Grounds	32,445	2–4	L3
7	April 22	Dodgers	3–4	Newcombe (2–0)	**Maglie** (0–1)	–	Polo Grounds	32,954	2–5	L4
8	April 23	@ Phillies	4–8	Thompson (1–0)	**Hearn** (1–1)	–	Shibe Park	17,283	2–6	L5
9	April 24	@ Phillies	4–6	Miller (1–0)	**Bowman** (0–1)	Konstanty (1)	Shibe Park	16,274	2–7	L6
10	April 25	@ Phillies	1–2	Heintzelman (1–0)	**Jansen** (1–2)	–	Shibe Park	5,257	2–8	L7
11	April 26	Braves	0–3	Sain (1–1)	**Maglie** (0–2)	–	Polo Grounds	15,134	2–9	L8
12	April 27	Braves	3–7	Spahn (1–2)	**Hearn** (1–2)	–	Polo Grounds	6,981	2–10	L9
13	April 28	@ Dodgers	4–8	Roe (2–0)	**Bowman** (0–2)	–	Ebbets Field	22,117	2–11	L10
14	April 29	@ Dodgers	3–6	Erskine (1–2)	**Jansen** (1–3)	King (1)	Ebbets Field	28,124	2–12	L11
15	April 30	@ Dodgers	8–5	**Maglie** (1–2)	Van Cuyk (0–2)	**Jones** (1)	Ebbets Field	33,962	3–12	W1

May: 18–9 (Home 11–5, Road 7–4)

#	Date	Opponent	Score	Win	Loss	Save	Stadium	Attendance	Record	Streak
16	May 1	Cubs	5–3	**Hearn** (2–2)	Minner (1–2)	**Jones** (2)	Polo Grounds	12,009	4–12	W2
17	May 2	Cubs	8–1	**Spencer** (1–0)	Schmitz (0–2)	–	Polo Grounds	4,976	5–12	W3
18	May 3	Pirates	4–7	Queen (1–1)	**Jones** (0–2)	Werle (4)	Polo Grounds	9,649	5–13	L1
19	May 4	Pirates	5–1	**Maglie** (2–2)	Jones (0–2)	–	Polo Grounds	3,947	6–13	W1
20	May 5	Pirates	8–3	**Bowman** (1–2)	Koski (0–1)	–	Polo Grounds	10,265	7–13	W2
21	May 6	Reds	3–4	Smith (2–1)	**Jones** (0–3)	–	Polo Grounds	27,766	7–14	L1
22	May 6	Reds	8–5	**Koslo** (1–1)	Ramsdell (0–4)	**Spencer** (1)	Polo Grounds	27,766	8–14	W1
23	May 8	Cardinals	6–2	**Jansen** (2–3)	Presko (1–1)	–	Polo Grounds	20,379	9–14	W2
24	May 9	Cardinals	17–3	**Maglie** (3–2)	Lanier (1–1)	–	Polo Grounds	7,669	10–14	W3
25	May 10	Cardinals	3–2	**Bowman** (2–2)	Poholsky (2–2)	**Koslo** (1)	Polo Grounds	5,436	11–14	W4
―	May 11	Phillies	Postponed (inclement weather). Rescheduled to May 13.							
26	May 12	Phillies	5–6	Konstanty (2–3)	**Koslo** (1–2)	–	Polo Grounds	12,856	11–15	L1
27	May 13	Phillies	11–2	**Jansen** (3–3)	Thompson (1–2)	–	Polo Grounds	26,740	12–15	W1
28	May 13	Phillies	4–2	**Maglie** (4–2)	Heintzelman (1–4)	–	Polo Grounds	26,740	13–15	W2
29	May 15	@ Pirates	3–7	Werle (2–0)	**Spencer** (1–1)	Law (1)	Forbes Field	25,838	13–16	L1
30	May 16	@ Pirates	2–1	**Hearn** (3–2)	Walsh (0–1)		Forbes Field	24,103	14–16	W1
31	May 17	@ Pirates	7–12	Dickson (5–2)	**Kennedy** (0–1)	–	Forbes Field	13,926	14–17	L1
32	May 18	@ Reds	4–3	**Maglie** (5–2)	Raffensberger (1–4)	**Koslo** (2)	Crosley Field	16,488	15–17	W1
33	May 19	@ Reds	3–2	**Kennedy** (1–1)	Fox (2–2)	–	Crosley Field	7,716	16–17	W2
34	May 20	@ Cardinals	7–8	Munger (1–1)	**Bowman** (2-3)	Presko (2)	Sportsman's Park	22,666	16–18	L1
35	May 21	@ Cardinals	2–5	Staley (6–3)	**Jansen** (3–4)	–	Sportsman's Park	6,744	16–19	L2
―	May 22	@ Cubs	Postponed (inclement weather). Rescheduled to August 1.							
36	May 23	@ Cubs	2–1	**Maglie** (6–2)	Minner (2–3)	–	Wrigley Field	11,337	17–19	W1
37	May 25	@ Phillies	8–5	**Spencer** (2–1)	Miller (1–1)	**Jones** (3)	Shibe Park	21,082	18–19	W2
38	May 26	@ Phillies	2–0	**Jansen** (4–4)	Roberts (4–4)	–	Shibe Park	26,491	19–19	W3
39	May 27	@ Phillies	2–0	**Maglie** (7–2)	Meyer (3–2)	–	Shibe Park	9,090	20–19	W4
40	May 28	Braves	1–4	Spahn (5–3)	**Jones** (0–4)	–	Polo Grounds	23,101	20–20	L1
41	May 30	Braves	6–5	**Jansen** (5–4)	Surkont (5–3)	–	Polo Grounds	46,499	21–20	W1
42	May 30	Braves	3–6	Bickford (7–4)	**Hearn** (3–3)	–	Polo Grounds	46,499	21–21	L1

June: 18–11 (Home 8–6, Road 10–5)

#	Date	Opponent	Score	Win	Loss	Save	Stadium	Attendance	Record	Streak
43	June 1	Pirates	8–2	**Maglie** (8–2)	Chambers (3–4)	–	Polo Grounds	16,875	22–21	W1
44	June 2	Pirates	14–3	**Hearn** (4–3)	LaPalme (0–2)	–	Polo Grounds	7,003	23–21	W2
45	June 3	Cardinals	1–0	**Koslo** (2–2)	Lanier (2–4)	–	Polo Grounds	32,564	24–21	W3
46	June 3	Cardinals	3–4	Brecheen (3–0)	**Gettel** (0–2)	Pollet (1)	Polo Grounds	32,564	24–22	L1
47	June 4	Cardinals	2–7	Presko (5–2)	**Jansen** (5–5)	–	Polo Grounds	6,833	24–23	L2
48	June 5	Reds	3–2	**Maglie** (9–2)	Perkowski (0–1)	–	Polo Grounds	12,119	25–23	W1
49	June 6	Reds	4–5	Peterson (1–1)	**Kennedy** (1–2)	Blackwell (1)	Polo Grounds	3,859	25–24	L1
50	June 7	Reds	4–5	Raffensberger (5–5)	**Koslo** (2–3)	Smith (5)	Polo Grounds	3,792	25–25	L2
―	June 8	@ Cubs	Postponed (inclement weather). Rescheduled to August 27.							
51	June 9	Cubs	10–1	**Hearn** (5–3)	Minner (3–4)	–	Polo Grounds	8,586	26–25	W1
52	June 10	Cubs	6–1	**Jansen** (6–5)	Lown (0–3)	–	Polo Grounds	11,476	27–25	W2
53	June 10	Cubs	3–7	Rush (4–2)	**Maglie** (9–3)	–	Polo Grounds	11,476	27–26	L1
54	June 12	@ Reds	6–3	**Gettel** (1–2)	Raffensberger (5–6)	–	Crosley Field	13,978	28–26	W1
55	June 13	@ Reds	5–2	**Spencer** (3–1)	Blackwell (7–5)	**Maglie** (1)	Crosley Field	3,462	29–26	W2
56	June 14	@ Reds	11–6	**Jansen** (7–5)	Fox (3–3)	–	Crosley Field	3,198	30–26	W3
57	June 15	@ Pirates	11–6	**Hearn** (6–3)	Friend (1–3)	–	Forbes Field	22,746	31–26	W4
58	June 16	@ Pirates	6–1	**Maglie** (10–3)	LaPalme (1–3)	–	Forbes Field	8,673	32–26	W5
59	June 17	@ Pirates	5–11	Pollet (1-3)	**Bowman** (2–4)	Werle (6)	Forbes Field	25,090	32–27	L1
60	June 17	@ Pirates	7–6	**Jansen** (8–5)	Dickson (8–6)	–	Forbes Field	25,090	33–27	W1
61	June 18	@ Cardinals	5–4	**Maglie** (11–3)	Boyer (1–2)	–	Sportsman's Park	16,201	34–27	W2
62	June 19	@ Cardinals	2–1	**Jansen** (9–5)	Chambers (3–7)	–	Sportsman's Park	13,742	35–27	W3
63	June 20	@ Cardinals	2–4	Munger (3–3)	**Hearn** (6–4)	–	Sportsman's Park	15,483	35–28	L1
64	June 21	@ Cardinals	0–2	Staley (9–6)	**Jones** (0–5)	–	Sportsman's Park	8,706	35–29	L2
65	June 22	@ Cubs	9–6	**Spencer** (4–1)	Leonard (4–2)	–	Wrigley Field	5,985	36–29	W1
66	June 23	@ Cubs	4–7	Lown (1–4)	**Jansen** (9–6)	Hiller (1)	Wrigley Field	18,190	36–30	L1
67	June 24	@ Cubs	10–7	**Jones** (1–5)	Hatten (1–1)	–	Wrigley Field	25,805	37–30	W1
68	June 26	Dodgers	4–0	**Maglie** (12–3)	Roe (10–1)	–	Polo Grounds	45,732	38–30	W2
69	June 27	Dodgers	4–10	Newcombe (10–4)	**Hearn** (6–5)	–	Polo Grounds	23,767	38–31	L1
70	June 28	Dodgers	5–4	**Jones** (2–5)	Branca (5–2)	–	Polo Grounds	27,756	39–31	W1
―	June 29	@ Braves	Postponed (inclement weather). Rescheduled to September 5.							
71	June 30	@ Braves	7–19	Bickford (9–7)	**Maglie** (12–4)	Surkont (1)	Braves Field	10,812	39–32	L1

July: 17–12 (Home 10–7, Road 7–5)

#	Date	Opponent	Score	Win	Loss	Save	Stadium	Attendance	Record	Streak
72	July 1	@ Braves	4–1	**Jansen** (10–6)	Spahn (8–7)	–	Braves Field	5,985	40–32	W1
73	July 2	Phillies	4–3	**Hearn** (7–5)	Heintzelman (3–8)	**Spencer** (2)	Polo Grounds	23,046	41–32	W2
74	July 3	Phillies	9–8	**Jansen** (11–6)	Thompson (2–6)	–	Polo Grounds	9,295	42–32	W3
75	July 4	@ Dodgers	5–6	Roe (12–1)	**Jones** (2–6)	–	Ebbets Field	34,620	42–33	L1
76	July 4	@ Dodgers	2–4	Branca (6–2)	**Koslo** (2–4)	–	Ebbets Field	34,620	42–34	L2
77	July 5	@ Dodgers	4–8	Newcombe (12–4)	**Jansen** (11–7)	–	Ebbets Field	32,921	42–35	L3
78	July 6	Braves	12–10	**Koslo** (3–4)	Wilson (1–1)	–	Polo Grounds	7,443	43–35	W1
79	July 7	Braves	7–6	**Jansen** (12–7)	Spahn (8–8)	–	Polo Grounds	11,307	44–35	W2
80	July 8	Braves	5–6	Chipman (1–0)	**Koslo** (3–5)	–	Polo Grounds	17,431	44–36	L1
**18th All-Star Game in Detroit, MI**
81	July 12	Cardinals	0–2	Staley (12–8)	**Jansen** (12–8)	–	Polo Grounds	13,448	44–37	L2
82	July 13	Cardinals	14–4	**Koslo** (4–5)	Munger (4–4)	–	Polo Grounds	22,730	45–37	W1
83	July 14	Cardinals	3–4	Brazle (2–0)	**Spencer** (4–2)	–	Polo Grounds	10,007	45–38	L1
84	July 15	Pirates	6–7	Dickson (11–10)	**Koslo** (4–6)	–	Polo Grounds	17,945	45–39	L2
85	July 15	Pirates	8–3	**Hearn** (8–5)	Werle (5–2)	–	Polo Grounds	17,945	46–39	W1
86	July 16	Pirates	7–6	**Spencer** (5–2)	Werle (5–3)	–	Polo Grounds	3,390	47–39	W2
87	July 17	Cubs	4–7	McLish (2–3)	**Jones** (2–7)	–	Polo Grounds	8,672	47–40	L1
88	July 18	Cubs	3–6	Hiller (6–7)	**Koslo** (4–7)	–	Polo Grounds	3,538	47–41	L2
―	July 19	Cubs	Postponed (inclement weather). Rescheduled to August 27.							
89	July 20	Reds	11–5	**Maglie** (13–4)	Blackwell (9–8)	–	Polo Grounds	14,205	48–41	W1
90	July 21	Reds	3–2	**Jansen** (13–8)	Fox (6–5)	–	Polo Grounds	7,489	49–41	W2
91	July 22	Reds	3–7	Raffensberger (10–10)	**Koslo** (4–8)	–	Polo Grounds	15,843	49–42	L1
92	July 22	Reds	9–8	**Koslo** (5–8)	Blackwell (9–9)	–	Polo Grounds	15,843	50–42	W1
93	July 24	@ Pirates	4–3	**Maglie** (14–4)	Friend (3–6)	–	Forbes Field	17,858	51–42	W2
94	July 25	@ Pirates	4–5	Wilks (2–3)	**Spencer** (5–3)	–	Forbes Field	8,718	51–43	L1
95	July 27	@ Reds	5–3	**Hearn** (9–5)	Fox (6–6)	**Spencer** (3)	Crosley Field	11,874	52–43	W1
96	July 28	@ Reds	3–1	**Jansen** (14–8)	Raffensberger (10–11)	**Spencer** (4)	Crosley Field	4,881	53–43	W2
97	July 29	@ Reds	3–1	**Maglie** (15–4)	Ramsdell (8–10)	–	Crosley Field	21,700	54–43	W3
98	July 29	@ Reds	6–4	**Spencer** (6–3)	Perkowski (3–5)	**Jones** (4)	Crosley Field	21,700	55–43	W4
99	July 30	@ Cubs	6–7	Leonard (10–3)	**Spencer** (6–4)	–	Wrigley Field	7,518	55–44	L1
100	July 31	@ Cubs	4–3	**Hearn** (10–5)	Hiller (6–9)	**Maglie** (2)	Wrigley Field	7,693	56–44	W1

August: 20–9 (Home 14–3, Road 6–6)

#	Date	Opponent	Score	Win	Loss	Save	Stadium	Attendance	Record	Streak
101	August 1	@ Cubs	2–3	McLish (3–4)	**Jansen** (14–9)	–	Wrigley Field	26,821	56–45	L1
102	August 1	@ Cubs	2–0	**Corwin** (1–0)	Kelly (2–1)	–	Wrigley Field	26,821	57–45	W1
103	August 2	@ Cubs	3–6	Rush (6–6)	**Jones** (2–8)	–	Wrigley Field	7,966	57–46	L1
104	August 3	@ Cardinals	4–5	Brecheen (7–2)	**Maglie** (15–5)	Bokelmann (1)	Sportsman's Park	13,662	57–47	L2
105	August 4	@ Cardinals	10–0	**Koslo** (6–8)	Chambers (7–10)	–	Sportsman's Park	17,842	58–47	W1
106	August 5	@ Cardinals	8–4	**Corwin** (2–0)	Staley (12–11)	**Maglie** (3)	Sportsman's Park	28,769	59–47	W2
―	August 7	@ Dodgers	Postponed (inclement weather). Rescheduled to August 8.							
107	August 8	@ Dodgers	2–7	Erskine (12–8)	**Hearn** (10–6)	–	Ebbets Field	19,208	59–48	L1
108	August 8	@ Dodgers	6–7	King (11–5)	**Koslo** (6–9)	–	Ebbets Field	27,004	59–49	L2
109	August 9	@ Dodgers	5–6	King (12–5)	**Jones** (2–9)	–	Ebbets Field	15,838	59–50	L3
―	August 10	Phillies	Postponed (inclement weather). Rescheduled to August 12.							
110	August 11	Phillies	0–4	Roberts (16–8)	**Hearn** (10–7)	–	Polo Grounds	8,160	59–51	L4
111	August 12	Phillies	3–2	**Maglie** (16–5)	Thompson (3–7)	–	Polo Grounds	17,072	60–51	W1
112	August 12	Phillies	2–1	**Corwin** (3–0)	Johnson (3–3)	–	Polo Grounds	17,072	61–51	W2
113	August 13	Phillies	5–2	**Jansen** (15–9)	Church (13–8)	**Koslo** (3)	Polo Grounds	8,182	62–51	W3
114	August 14	Dodgers	4–2	**Spencer** (7–4)	Palica (2–5)	–	Polo Grounds	42,857	63–51	W4
115	August 15	Dodgers	3–1	**Hearn** (11–7)	Branca (10–4)	–	Polo Grounds	21,007	64–51	W5
116	August 16	Dodgers	2–1	**Maglie** (17–5)	Newcombe (16–6)	–	Polo Grounds	20,227	65–51	W6
117	August 17	@ Phillies	8–5	**Spencer** (8–4)	Heintzelman (6–9)	–	Shibe Park	20,683	66–51	W7
118	August 18	@ Phillies	2–0	**Jansen** (16–9)	Roberts (16–10)	–	Shibe Park	20,652	67–51	W8
119	August 19	@ Phillies	5–4	**Corwin** (4–0)	Heintzelman (6–10)	–	Shibe Park	12,515	68–51	W9
120	August 21	Reds	7–4	**Spencer** (9–4)	Smith (5–4)	–	Polo Grounds	6,315	69–51	W10
121	August 22	Reds	4–3	**Jones** (3–9)	Blackwell (13–11)	**Corwin** (1)	Polo Grounds	7,034	70–51	W11
122	August 24	Cardinals	6–5	**Jones** (4–9)	Staley (14–13)	–	Polo Grounds	10,559	71–51	W12
―	August 25	Cardinals	Postponed (inclement weather). Rescheduled to September 11.							
123	August 26	Cubs	5–4	**Spencer** (10–4)	Dubiel (1–2)	–	Polo Grounds	28,289	72–51	W13
124	August 26	Cubs	5–1	**Hearn** (12–7)	Klippstein (5–5)	–	Polo Grounds	28,289	73–51	W14
125	August 27	Cubs	5–4	**Jansen** (17–9)	Leonard (10–5)	–	Polo Grounds	15,748	74–51	W15
126	August 27	Cubs	6–3	**Corwin** (5–0)	Rush (8–9)	–	Polo Grounds	15,748	75–51	W16
127	August 28	Pirates	0–2	Pollet (5–10)	**Jones** (4–10)	–	Polo Grounds	8,803	75–52	L1
128	August 29	Pirates	3–1	**Hearn** (13–7)	Dickson (17–12)	–	Polo Grounds	7,678	76–52	W1
129	August 30	Pirates	9–10	Dickson (18–12)	**Jansen** (17–10)	–	Polo Grounds	8,230	76–53	L1

September: 20–5 (Home 6–1, Road 14–4)

#	Date	Opponent	Score	Win	Loss	Save	Stadium	Attendance	Record	Streak
130	September 1	Dodgers	8–1	**Maglie** (18–5)	Branca (12–6)	–	Polo Grounds	40,794	77–53	W1
131	September 2	Dodgers	11–2	**Hearn** (14–7)	Newcombe (17–8)	–	Polo Grounds	37,248	78–53	W2
132	September 3	Phillies	3–6	Roberts (18–11)	**Corwin** (5–1)	–	Polo Grounds	31,397	78–54	L1
133	September 3	Phillies	3–1	**Koslo** (7–9)	Jordan (1–2)	–	Polo Grounds	31,397	79–54	W1
134	September 5	@ Braves	3–2	**Jones** (5–10)	Spahn (18–12)	–	Braves Field	11,985	80–54	W2
135	September 5	@ Braves	9–1	**Maglie** (19–5)	Wilson (6–5)	–	Braves Field	11,985	81–54	W3
―	September 6	@ Braves	Postponed (inclement weather). Rescheduled to September 7.							
136	September 7	@ Braves	7–3	**Jansen** (18–10)	Surkont (11–13)	–	Braves Field	1,500	82–54	W4
137	September 8	@ Dodgers	0–9	Newcombe (18–8)	**Hearn** (14–8)	–	Ebbets Field	23,171	82–55	L1
138	September 9	@ Dodgers	2–1	**Maglie** (20–5)	Branca (13–7)	–	Ebbets Field	34,004	83–55	W1
139	September 11	@ Cardinals	10–5	**Koslo** (8–9)	Bokelmann (2–3)	–	Sportsman's Park	28,348	84–55	W2
140	September 11	@ Cardinals	3–4	Chambers (3–4)	**Jansen** (18–11)	–	Sportsman's Park	28,348	84–56	L1
―	September 12	@ Cardinals	Postponed (inclement weather). Rescheduled to September 13.							
141	September 13	@ Cardinals	4–6	Bokelmann (3–3)	**Maglie** (20–6)	Staley (3)	Sportsman's Park	4,160	84–57	L2
142	September 14	@ Cubs	7–2	**Hearn** (15–8)	Rush (9–10)	**Spencer** (5)	Wrigley Field	5,109	85–57	W1
143	September 15	@ Cubs	5–2	**Jones** (6–10)	Minner (6–16)	–	Wrigley Field	10,051	86–57	W2
144	September 16	@ Pirates	7–1	**Jansen** (19–11)	Pollet (6–12)	–	Forbes Field	24,990	87–57	W3
145	September 16	@ Pirates	6–4	**Maglie** (21–6)	Dickson (18–15)	–	Forbes Field	24,990	88–57	W4
146	September 18	@ Reds	6–5	**Koslo** (9–9)	Ramsdell (9–17)	**Spencer** (6)	Crosley Field	5,448	89–57	W5
147	September 20	@ Reds	1–3	Raffensberger (15–17)	**Hearn** (15–9)	Blackwell (2)	Crosley Field	2,194	89–58	L1
148	September 22	Braves	4–1	**Jansen** (20–11)	Spahn (21–13)	–	Polo Grounds	11,925	90–58	W1
149	September 23	Braves	4–1	**Maglie** (22–6)	Surkont (12–15)	–	Polo Grounds	17,774	91–58	W2
150	September 24	Braves	4–3	**Koslo** (10–9)	Nichols (10–8)	–	Polo Grounds	6,059	92–58	W3
151	September 25	@ Phillies	5–1	**Hearn** (16–9)	Roberts (21–13)	**Maglie** (4)	Shibe Park	7,219	93–58	W4
152	September 26	@ Phillies	10–1	**Jansen** (21–11)	Johnson (5–8)	–	Shibe Park	14,009	94–58	W5
153	September 29	@ Braves	3–0	**Maglie** (23–6)	Spahn (22–14)	–	Braves Field	7,091	95–58	W6
154	September 30	@ Braves	3–2	**Jansen** (22–11)	Wilson (7–7)	–	Braves Field	13,209	96–58	W7

October: 2–1 (Home 1–1, Road 1–0)

#	Date	Opponent	Score	Win	Loss	Save	Stadium	Attendance	Record	Streak
155	October 1	@ Dodgers	3–1	**Hearn** (17–9)	Branca (13–11)	–	Ebbets Field	30,707	97–58	W8
156	October 2	Dodgers	0–10	Labine (5–1)	**Jones** (6–11)	–	Polo Grounds	38,609	97–59	L1
157	October 3	Dodgers	5–4	**Jansen** (23–11)	Branca (13–12)	–	Polo Grounds	34,320	98–59	W1

Legend: = Win = Loss = Postponement
Bold = Giants team member

== Player stats ==
= Indicates team leader

=== Batting ===
==== Starters by position ====
Note: Pos = Position; G = Games played; AB = At bats; H = Hits; Avg. = Batting average; HR = Home runs; RBI = Runs batted in

Pos	Player	G	AB	H	Avg.	HR	RBI
C	Wes Westrum	124	361	79	.219	20	70
1B	Whitey Lockman	153	614	173	.282	12	73
2B	Eddie Stanky	145	515	127	.247	14	43
3B	Hank Thompson	87	264	62	.235	8	33
SS	Alvin Dark	156	646	196	.303	14	69
OF	Monte Irvin	151	558	174	.312	24	121
OF	Willie Mays	121	464	127	.274	20	68
OF	Don Mueller	122	469	130	.277	16	69

==== Other batters ====
Note: G = Games played; AB = At bats; H = Hits; Avg. = Batting average; HR = Home runs; RBI = Runs batted in

Player	G	AB	H	Avg.	HR	RBI
Bobby Thomson	148	518	152	.293	32	101
Ray Noble	55	141	33	.234	5	26
Bill Rigney	44	69	16	.232	4	9
Davey Williams	30	64	17	.266	2	8
Spider Jorgensen	28	51	12	.235	2	8
Clint Hartung	21	44	9	.205	0	2
Sal Yvars	25	41	13	.317	2	3
Jack Lohrke	23	40	8	.200	1	3
Artie Wilson	19	22	4	.182	0	1
Jack Maguire	16	20	8	.400	1	4
Earl Rapp	13	11	1	.091	0	1
Hank Schenz	8	0	0	----	0	0

=== Pitching ===
==== Starting pitchers ====
Note: G = Games pitched; IP = Innings pitched; W = Wins; L = Losses; ERA = Earned run average; SO = Strikeouts

Player	G	IP	W	L	ERA	SO
Sal Maglie	42	298.0	23	6	2.93	146
Larry Jansen	39	278.2	23	11	3.04	145
Jim Hearn	34	211.1	17	9	3.62	66

==== Other pitchers ====
Note: G = Games pitched; IP = Innings pitched; W = Wins; L = Losses; ERA = Earned run average; SO = Strikeouts

Player	G	IP	W	L	ERA	SO
Dave Koslo	39	149.2	10	9	3.31	54
Sheldon Jones	41	120.1	6	11	4.26	58
Al Corwin	15	59.0	5	1	3.66	30
Roger Bowman	9	26.1	2	4	6.15	24
Jack Kramer	4	4.2	0	0	15.43	2

==== Relief pitchers ====
Note: G = Games pitched; W = Wins; L = Losses; SV = Saves; ERA = Earned run average; SO = Strikeouts

Player	G	W	L	SV	ERA	SO
George Spencer	57	10	4	6	3.75	36
Al Gettel	30	1	2	0	4.87	36
Monty Kennedy	29	1	2	0	2.25	22
Alex Konikowski	3	0	0	0	0.00	5
George Bamberger	2	0	0	0	18.00	1
Red Hardy	2	0	0	0	6.75	0

== 1951 World Series ==
=== Game 1 ===
October 4, 1951, at Yankee Stadium in New York City

Team	1	2	3	4	5	6	7	8	9	R	H	E
New York (N)	2	0	0	0	0	3	0	0	0	5	10	1
New York (A)	0	1	0	0	0	0	0	0	0	1	7	1
W: Dave Koslo (1–0) L: Allie Reynolds (0–1)
HR: NYG – Alvin Dark (1)

=== Game 2 ===
October 5, 1951, at Yankee Stadium in New York City

Team	1	2	3	4	5	6	7	8	9	R	H	E
New York (N)	0	0	0	0	0	0	1	0	0	1	5	1
New York (A)	1	1	0	0	0	0	0	1	x	3	6	0
W: Ed Lopat (1–0) L: Larry Jansen (0–1)
HR: NYY – Joe Collins (1)

=== Game 3 ===
October 6, 1951, at the Polo Grounds in, New York City

Team	1	2	3	4	5	6	7	8	9	R	H	E
New York (A)	0	0	0	0	0	0	0	1	1	2	5	2
New York (N)	0	1	0	0	5	0	0	0	x	6	7	2
W: Jim Hearn (1–0) L: Vic Raschi (0–1)
HR: NYY – Gene Woodling (1) NYG – Whitey Lockman (1)

=== Game 4 ===
October 8, 1951, at the Polo Grounds in, New York City

Team	1	2	3	4	5	6	7	8	9	R	H	E
New York (A)	0	1	0	1	2	0	2	0	0	6	12	0
New York (N)	1	0	0	0	0	0	0	0	1	2	8	2
W: Allie Reynolds (1–1) L: Sal Maglie (0–1)
HR: NYY – Joe DiMaggio (1)

=== Game 5 ===
October 9, 1951, at the Polo Grounds in New York City

Team	1	2	3	4	5	6	7	8	9	R	H	E
New York (A)	0	0	5	2	0	2	4	0	0	13	12	1
New York (N)	1	0	0	0	0	0	0	0	0	1	5	3
W: Ed Lopat (2–0) L: Larry Jansen (0–2)
HR: NYY – Gil McDougald (1), Phil Rizzuto (1)

=== Game 6 ===
October 10, 1951, at Yankee Stadium in New York City

Team	1	2	3	4	5	6	7	8	9	R	H	E
New York (N)	0	0	0	0	1	0	0	0	2	3	11	1
New York (A)	1	0	0	0	0	3	0	0	x	4	7	0
W: Vic Raschi (1–1) L: Dave Koslo (1-1) S: Bob Kuzava (1)

== Awards and honors ==
- Willie Mays: National League Rookie of the Year

== Farm system ==
Level	Team	League	Manager
AAA	Minneapolis Millers	American Association	Tommy Heath
AAA	Ottawa Giants	International League	Hugh Poland
A	Jacksonville Tars	Sally League	Ben Geraghty
A	Sioux City Soos	Western League	Frank Genovese
B	Sunbury Giants	Interstate League	Charlie Fox
B	Knoxville Smokies	Tri-State League	Jack Aragón
C	St. Cloud Rox	Northern League	Harold Kollar
C	Idaho Falls Russets	Pioneer League	Red Jessen
C	Muskogee Giants	Western Association	Hal Bamberger
D	Bristol Twins	Appalachian League	Russ Wein
D	Sanford Giants	Florida State League	Richie Klaus
D	Springfield Giants	Ohio–Indiana League	Andy Gilbert
D	Lawton Giants	Sooner State League	Ray Baker
D	Lenoir Red Sox	Western Carolina League	Claude Jonnard, Okey Flowers and John Olsen
D	Oshkosh Giants	Wisconsin State League	Dave Garcia

LEAGUE CHAMPIONS: Sioux City
