= 1953 New York Giants (MLB) season =

Major League Baseball season

1953 New York Giants
- League: National League
- Ballpark: Polo Grounds
- City: New York City
- Record: 70–84 (.455)
- League place: 5th
- Owners: Horace Stoneham
- General managers: Chub Feeney
- Managers: Leo Durocher
- Television: WPIX (Russ Hodges, Ernie Harwell)
- Radio: WMCA (Russ Hodges, Ernie Harwell)

The 1953 New York Giants season was the franchise's 71st season. The team finished in fifth place in the National League with a 70–84 record, 35 games behind the Brooklyn Dodgers.

== Offseason ==
- Marshall Bridges was signed as an amateur free agent by the Giants.
- Han Urbanus was offered a contract, which would have made him the first European-trained player in the majors, and the first Dutch-born player since Bill Lelivelt in 1909. He declined to sign and returned to play in the Netherlands.
- After 1953 season: The Giants embarked of a month-long exhibition tour to Hawaii, Japan, Manila, Okinawa, and Guam. This marked the first time a Major League Baseball team to play Japanese teams. The Giants went 12-1-1 during their tour in Japan, including beating the 1953 Japan Series champions, the Tokyo Giants, 11–1.

== Regular season ==
=== Season standings ===
National League
Team	W	L	Pct.	GB	Home	Road
Brooklyn Dodgers	105	49	.682	—	60‍–‍17	45‍–‍32
Milwaukee Braves	92	62	.597	13	45‍–‍31	47‍–‍31
Philadelphia Phillies	83	71	.539	22	48‍–‍29	35‍–‍42
St. Louis Cardinals	83	71	.539	22	48‍–‍30	35‍–‍41
New York Giants	70	84	.455	35	38‍–‍39	32‍–‍45
Cincinnati Redlegs	68	86	.442	37	38‍–‍39	30‍–‍47
Chicago Cubs	65	89	.422	40	43‍–‍34	22‍–‍55
Pittsburgh Pirates	50	104	.325	55	26‍–‍51	24‍–‍53

=== Record vs. opponents ===
1953 National League record Sources:
Team	BRO	CHC	CIN	MIL	NYG	PHI	PIT	STL
Brooklyn	—	13–9–1	15–7	13–9	15–7	14–8	20–2	15–7
Chicago	9–13–1	—	12–10	8–14	9–13	5–17	11–11	11–11
Cincinnati	7–15	10–12	—	8–14	9–13	12–10	15–7	7–15–1
Milwaukee	9–13	14–8	14–8	—	14–8–1	13–9–1	15–7	13–9–1
New York	7–15	13–9	13–9	8–14–1	—	9–13	11–11	9–13
Philadelphia	8–14	17–5	10–12	9–13–1	13–9	—	15–7	11–11–1
Pittsburgh	2–20	11–11	7–15	7–15	11–11	7–15	—	5–17
St. Louis	7–15	11–11	15–7–1	9–13–1	13–9	11–11–1	17–5	—

=== Notable transactions ===
- July 1, 1953: Marv Grissom was selected off waivers by the Giants from the Boston Red Sox.

=== Roster ===
1953 New York Giants
Roster
Pitchers: 26 Bill Connelly; 27 Al Corwin; 28 Rubén Gómez; 42 Marv Grissom; 21 Jim Hearn; 42 Frank Hiller; 46 Larry Jansen; 32 Monte Kennedy; 31 Dave Koslo; 37 Max Lanier; 35 Sal Maglie; 30 George Spencer; 49 Hoyt Wilhelm; 26 Al Worthington	Catchers: 5 Sam Calderone; 8 Ray Katt; 8 Ray Noble; 9 Wes Westrum; 7 Sal Yvars; Infielders: 19 Alvin Dark; 17 Tookie Gilbert; 14 Bobby Hofman; 25 Whitey Lockman; 18 Bill Rigney; 12 Daryl Spencer; 16 Hank Thompson; 10 Davey Williams	Outfielders: 20 Monte Irvin; 22 Don Mueller; 38 Dusty Rhodes; 23 Bobby Thomson; Other batters: 40 George Wilson	Manager: 2 Leo Durocher; Coaches: 6 Fred Fitzsimmons; 3 Herman Franks; 1 Frank Shellenback

== Player stats ==
=== Batting ===
==== Starters by position ====
Note: Pos = Position; G = Games played; AB = At bats; H = Hits; Avg. = Batting average; HR = Home runs; RBI = Runs batted in

Pos	Player	G	AB	H	Avg.	HR	RBI
C	Wes Westrum	107	290	65	.224	12	30
1B	Whitey Lockman	150	607	179	.295	9	61
2B	Davey Williams	112	340	101	.297	3	34
SS	Alvin Dark	155	647	194	.300	23	88
3B	Hank Thompson	114	388	117	.302	24	74
OF	Monte Irvin	124	444	146	.329	21	97
OF	Don Mueller	131	480	160	.333	6	60
OF	Bobby Thomson	154	608	175	.288	26	106

==== Other batters ====
Note: G = Games played; AB = At bats; H = Hits; Avg. = Batting average; HR = Home runs; RBI = Runs batted in

Player	G	AB	H	Avg.	HR	RBI
Daryl Spencer	118	408	85	.208	20	56
Bobby Hofman	74	169	45	.266	12	34
Dusty Rhodes	76	163	38	.233	11	30
Tookie Gilbert	70	160	27	.169	3	16
Ray Noble	46	97	20	.206	4	14
Sal Yvars	23	47	13	.277	0	1
Sam Calderone	35	45	10	.222	0	8
Ray Katt	8	29	5	.172	0	1
Bill Rigney	19	20	5	.250	0	1
George Wilson	11	8	1	.125	0	0

=== Pitching ===
==== Starting pitchers ====
Note: G = Games pitched; IP = Innings pitched; W = Wins; L = Losses; ERA = Earned run average; SO = Strikeouts

Player	G	IP	W	L	ERA	SO
Rubén Gómez	29	204.0	13	11	3.40	113
Jim Hearn	36	196.2	9	12	4.53	77
Larry Jansen	36	184.2	11	16	4.14	88
Sal Maglie	27	145.1	8	9	4.15	80
Al Worthington	20	102.0	4	8	3.44	52
Alvin Dark	1	1.0	0	0	18.00	0

==== Other pitchers ====
Note: G = Games pitched; IP = Innings pitched; W = Wins; L = Losses; ERA = Earned run average; SO = Strikeouts

Player	G	IP	W	L	ERA	SO
Dave Koslo	37	111.2	6	12	4.76	36
Marv Grissom	21	84.1	4	2	3.95	46
Bill Connelly	8	20.1	0	1	11.07	11

==== Relief pitchers ====
Note: G = Games pitched; W = Wins; L = Losses; SV = Saves; ERA = Earned run average; SO = Strikeouts

Player	G	W	L	SV	ERA	SO
Hoyt Wilhelm	68	7	8	15	3.04	71
Al Corwin	48	6	4	2	4.98	49
Frank Hiller	19	2	1	0	6.15	10
Monty Kennedy	18	0	0	0	7.15	11
Max Lanier	3	0	0	0	6.75	2
George Spencer	1	0	0	0	7.71	1

== Farm system ==
Level	Team	League	Manager
AAA	Minneapolis Millers	American Association	Frank Genovese and Fred Fitzsimmons
AA	Nashville Vols	Southern Association	Hugh Poland
A	Sioux City Soos	Western League	Ray Mueller
B	Danville Leafs	Carolina League	Andy Gilbert
C	St. Cloud Rox	Northern League	Charlie Fox
C	Muskogee Giants	Western Association	Harold Kollar
D	Mayfield Clothiers	KITTY League	Austin Knickerbocker
D	Pauls Valley Raiders	Sooner State League	Richie Klaus
D	Oshkosh Giants	Wisconsin State League	Dave Garcia

LEAGUE CHAMPIONS: Sioux City, Danville
