= 1952 New York Giants (MLB) season =

1952 New York Giants
- League: National League
- Ballpark: Polo Grounds
- City: New York City
- Record: 92–62 (.597)
- League place: 2nd
- Owners: Horace Stoneham
- General managers: Chub Feeney
- Managers: Leo Durocher
- Television: WPIX (Russ Hodges, Ernie Harwell)
- Radio: WMCA (Russ Hodges, Ernie Harwell)

The 1952 New York Giants season was the franchise's 70th season. The team finished in second place in the National League with a 92–62 record, 4 1/2 games behind the Brooklyn Dodgers.

== Offseason ==
- December 11, 1951: Eddie Stanky was traded by the Giants to the St. Louis Cardinals for Chuck Diering and Max Lanier.
- February 1952: Han Urbanus, of the Netherlands, arrives for a month of spring training with Giants.

== Regular season ==
=== Season standings ===
National League
Team	W	L	Pct.	GB	Home	Road
Brooklyn Dodgers	96	57	.627	—	45‍–‍33	51‍–‍24
New York Giants	92	62	.597	4½	50‍–‍27	42‍–‍35
St. Louis Cardinals	88	66	.571	8½	48‍–‍29	40‍–‍37
Philadelphia Phillies	87	67	.565	9½	47‍–‍29	40‍–‍38
Chicago Cubs	77	77	.500	19½	42‍–‍35	35‍–‍42
Cincinnati Reds	69	85	.448	27½	38‍–‍39	31‍–‍46
Boston Braves	64	89	.418	32	31‍–‍45	33‍–‍44
Pittsburgh Pirates	42	112	.273	54½	23‍–‍54	19‍–‍58

=== Record vs. opponents ===
1952 National League record Sources:
Team	BSN	BRO	CHC	CIN	NYG	PHI	PIT	STL
Boston	—	3–18–1	12–10	9–13	9–13	9–13	15–7–1	7–15
Brooklyn	18–3–1	—	13–9–1	17–5	8–14	10–12	19–3	11–11
Chicago	10–12	9–13–1	—	13–9	10–12	10–12	14–8	11–11
Cincinnati	13–9	5–17	9–13	—	6–16	10–12	16–6	10–12
New York	13–9	14–8	12–10	16–6	—	10–12	15–7	12–10
Philadelphia	13–9	12–10	12–10	12–10	12–10	—	16–6	10–12
Pittsburgh	7–15–1	3–19	8–14	6–16	7–15	6–16	—	5–17
St. Louis	15–7	11–11	11–11	12–10	10–12	12–10	17–5	—

=== Notable transactions ===
- May 17, 1952: Bill Howerton was selected off waivers by the Giants from the Pittsburgh Pirates.

=== Roster ===
1952 New York Giants
Roster
Pitchers: 39 George Bamberger; 38 Roger Bowman; 26 Bill Connelly; 17,40 Al Corwin; 26 Hal Gregg; 39 Jack Harshman; 21 Jim Hearn; 46 Larry Jansen; 32 Monte Kennedy; 31 Dave Koslo; 42,37 Max Lanier; 35 Sal Maglie; 24 Mario Picone; 30 George Spencer; 49 Hoyt Wilhelm	Catchers: 8 Ray Katt; 5 Ray Noble; 9 Wes Westrum; 7 Sal Yvars; Infielders: 19 Alvin Dark; 14 Bobby Hofman; 25 Whitey Lockman; 18 Bill Rigney; 5 Daryl Spencer; 23 Bobby Thomson; 10 Davey Williams	Outfielders: 28 Chuck Diering; 12,37 Bob Elliott; 33 Clint Hartung; 8 Bill Howerton; 20 Monte Irvin; 24 Willie Mays; 22 Don Mueller; 38 Dusty Rhodes; 16 Hank Thompson; 40 George Wilson; Other batters: 26 Dick Wakefield	Manager: 2 Leo Durocher; Coaches: 6 Fred Fitzsimmons; 3 Herman Franks; 1 Frank Shellenback

== Player stats ==
=== Batting ===
==== Starters by position ====
Note: Pos = Position; G = Games played; AB = At bats; H = Hits; Avg. = Batting average; HR = Home runs; RBI = Runs batted in

Pos	Player	G	AB	H	Avg.	HR	RBI
C	Wes Westrum	114	322	71	.220	14	43
1B	Whitey Lockman	154	606	176	.290	13	58
2B	Davey Williams	138	540	137	.254	13	55
SS	Al Dark	151	589	177	.301	14	73
3B	Bobby Thomson	153	608	164	.270	24	108
OF	Hank Thompson	128	423	110	.260	17	67
OF	Bob Elliott	98	272	62	.228	10	35
OF	Don Mueller	126	456	128	.281	12	49

==== Other batters ====
Note: G = Games played; AB = At bats; H = Hits; Avg. = Batting average; HR = Home runs; RBI = Runs batted in

Player	G	AB	H	Avg.	HR	RBI
Dusty Rhodes	67	176	44	.250	10	36
Sal Yvars	66	151	37	.245	4	18
Willie Mays	34	127	30	.236	4	23
Monte Irvin	46	126	39	.310	4	21
George Wilson	62	112	27	.241	2	16
Bill Rigney	60	90	27	.300	1	14
Clint Hartung	28	78	17	.218	3	8
Bobby Hofman	32	63	18	.286	2	4
Ray Katt	9	27	6	.222	0	1
Chuck Diering	41	23	4	.174	0	2
Daryl Spencer	7	17	5	.294	0	3
Bill Howerton	11	15	1	.067	0	1
Ray Noble	6	5	0	.000	0	0
Dick Wakefield	3	2	0	.000	0	0

=== Pitching ===
==== Starting pitchers ====
Note: G = Games pitched; IP = Innings pitched; W = Wins; L = Losses; ERA = Earned run average; SO = Strikeouts

Player	G	IP	W	L	ERA	SO
Jim Hearn	37	223.2	14	7	3.78	89
Sal Maglie	35	216.0	18	8	2.92	112
Larry Jansen	34	167.1	11	11	4.09	74
Jack Harshman	2	6.1	0	2	14.21	6

==== Other pitchers ====
Note: G = Games pitched; IP = Innings pitched; W = Wins; L = Losses; ERA = Earned run average; SO = Strikeouts

Player	G	IP	W	L	ERA	SO
Dave Koslo	41	166.1	10	7	3.19	67
Max Lanier	37	137.0	7	12	3.94	37
Al Corwin	21	67.2	6	1	2.66	36
Hal Gregg	16	36.1	0	1	4.71	13
Bill Connelly	11	31.2	5	0	4.55	22
Mario Picone	2	9.0	0	1	7.00	3
Roger Bowman	2	3.0	0	0	12.00	0

==== Relief pitchers ====
Note: G = Games pitched; W = Wins; L = Losses; SV = Saves; ERA = Earned run average; SO = Strikeouts

Player	G	W	L	SV	ERA	SO
Hoyt Wilhelm	71	15	3	11	2.43	108
George Spencer	35	3	5	3	5.55	27
Monte Kennedy	31	3	4	0	3.02	48
George Bamberger	5	0	0	0	9.00	0

== Farm system ==
Level	Team	League	Manager
AAA	Minneapolis Millers	American Association	Frank Genovese
AA	Nashville Vols	Southern Association	Hugh Poland
A	Jacksonville Tars	Sally League	Ben Geraghty
A	Sioux City Soos	Western League	Ray Mueller
B	Sunbury Giants	Interstate League	Skeeter Scalzi and Jim Reggio
B	Knoxville Smokies	Tri-State League	Jack Aragón and Fred Gerken
C	St. Cloud Rox	Northern League	Charlie Fox
C	Muskogee Giants	Western Association	Andy Gilbert
D	Kingsport Cherokees	Appalachian League	Harold Kollar
D	Moultrie Giants	Georgia–Florida League	Richie Klaus
D	Big Stone Gap Rebels	Mountain States League	Len Cross
D	Statesville Owls	North Carolina State League	Ed Sokol and Bob Deese
D	Pauls Valley Raiders	Sooner State League	Louis Brower
D	Oshkosh Giants	Wisconsin State League	Dave Garcia
