= 1951 National League tie-breaker series =

1951 best-of-three tie-breaker series in Major League Baseball

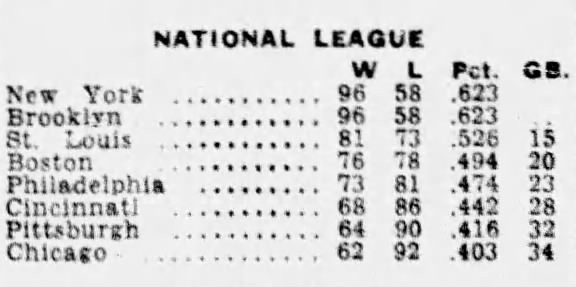
- Standings at the end of the 154-game schedule
Team (Wins)	Manager(s)	Season
New York Giants (2)	Leo Durocher	96–58 (.623)
Brooklyn Dodgers (1)	Chuck Dressen	96–58 (.623)
- Dates: October 1–3, 1951
- Venue: Polo Grounds (Manhattan); Ebbets Field (Brooklyn)

The 1951 National League tie-breaker series was a best-of-three series that extended Major League Baseball's (MLB) 1951 regular season to decide the winner of the National League (NL) pennant. The games were played on October 1, 2, and 3, 1951, between the New York Giants and Brooklyn Dodgers. It was necessary after both teams finished the season with identical win–loss records of 96–58. It is most famous for the walk-off home run hit by Bobby Thomson of the Giants in the deciding game, which has come to be known as baseball's "Shot Heard 'Round the World".

This was the second three-game playoff in NL history. After no tiebreakers had been needed since the American League (AL) became a major league in 1901, this was the third such tie in the previous six seasons. The Dodgers had been involved in the previous one as well, losing to the St. Louis Cardinals during the 1946 season in two straight games. In addition to the 1946 series, the AL had a one-game playoff in 1948.

The Giants won game one, while the Dodgers came back to win game two. After trailing for most of game three, the Giants rallied to win the game and the series. Consequently, they advanced to the 1951 World Series, in which they were defeated by the New York Yankees. In baseball statistics, the tie-breaker series counted as the 155th, 156th, and 157th regular season games by both teams; all events in the games were added to regular season statistics.

== Background ==
Sportswriters projected that the Giants, Dodgers, and Philadelphia Phillies would battle it out for the National League pennant during the 1951 Major League Baseball season. The previous season, the "Whiz Kids" Phillies won the NL pennant with a 91–63 record, while the Dodgers and Giants finished in second and third place, two and five games behind the Phillies, respectively. In the annual Associated Press poll, Brooklyn was projected as the favorite to win the pennant with 1,413 points, New York was second with 1,281, and Philadelphia was third with 1,176. The United Press, however, had New York winning the pennant; they had 81 votes compared to 55 for Brooklyn and 18 for Philadelphia.

Throughout the first half of the season, the Dodgers stayed in first place by a large margin. On August 11, they were 13 1/2 games ahead of the Giants and 14 1/2 games ahead of the Phillies, and as a result they were already looking ahead to facing the New York Yankees in the 1951 World Series; the Associated Press commented on their dominance, saying that "unless they completely fold in their last 50 games, they're in." While the Phillies fell out of contention, the Giants won 16 consecutive games from August 12 to August 27, cutting their deficit from 12 1/2 games to six.

By September 20, the Dodgers had ten games left to play while the Giants had seven, and the Dodgers had a 4 1/2 game advantage, making a pennant win appear imminent. However, the Giants won their last seven games, and the Dodgers needed to defeat the Phillies in the final game of the season to force a playoff; they did so by winning 9–8 in 14 innings, leaving both teams with a record of 96–58.

The National League used a three-game playoff (prior to 1969) to break a tie for the pennant, the winner of which would face the American League champion Yankees in the 1951 World Series. The Dodgers won the coin toss for home field advantage, but opted to host game one at Ebbets Field on October 1, while the Giants would as a result get to host games two and three at the Polo Grounds on October 2 and 3. The Dodgers chose Ralph Branca, who also started the first game of the 1946 tiebreaker, to start game one because he had beaten the Giants twice in the regular season, while the Giants chose Jim Hearn, who had beaten the Dodgers twice that year.

== Game 1 summary ==
Monday, October 1, 1951 1:30 pm (ET) at Ebbets Field in Brooklyn, New York
Team	1	2	3	4	5	6	7	8	9	R	H	E
New York	0	0	0	2	0	0	0	1	0	3	6	1
Brooklyn	0	1	0	0	0	0	0	0	0	1	5	1
WP: Jim Hearn (17–9) LP: Ralph Branca (13–11); Home runs: NYG: Bobby Thomson (31), Monte Irvin (24); BRO: Andy Pafko (29); Attendance: 30,707

Branca began the game by retiring the first three batters; Eddie Stanky and Alvin Dark flied out while Don Mueller grounded out. In the bottom of the first, Carl Furillo grounded out, and Pee Wee Reese hit a single. After Duke Snider flied out, Reese was caught stealing second base to end the inning. In the second inning, Branca retired all three hitters; when the Dodgers came up to bat, Jackie Robinson flied out and Roy Campanella grounded out. Andy Pafko scored the game's first run with a home run to left. After the third out, Willie Mays walked to start the third inning, and after the first out Stanky got the Giants' first hit, a single. After a fly out by Dark, the Giants remained without a run; Hearn retired all three batters in the bottom of the third to end the inning.

In the fourth inning, Monte Irvin was hit by a pitch between outs by Mueller and Whitey Lockman. Bobby Thomson then hit a home run to put the Giants up, 2–1. After the third out, the Dodgers came back to the plate. Reese grounded out, but Snider and Robinson hit back-to-back singles. Campanella grounded into a double play to end the inning. The Giants got one man on base in the top of the fifth inning, when Stanky singled with two outs. Pafko reached on an error to start off the bottom of the fifth, but was caught stealing second base; Gil Hodges and Branca both struck out to end the fifth. The only hit in the sixth inning was a single by Lockman, and the two teams entered the seventh inning with the score still 2–1.

There were no hits in the seventh inning, as both pitchers retired the first three batters they faced. In the top of the eighth inning, Irvin hit the third home run of the game, his 24th of the year, to make the score 3–1. Lockman then reached first base on an error and was able to advance to third base, but Mays and Hearn both struck out to keep the score intact. No Dodgers managed a hit in the bottom of the eighth, though the Dodgers brought in Jim Russell to use as a pinch hitter for Branca. In the ninth inning, Alvin Dark doubled for the Giants, but he was the only player on either team to earn a hit; Hearn retired all three Dodgers hitters to end the game with the 3–1 victory, earning a complete game win after allowing five hits to the Dodgers. Those in attendance included Bill Dickey, a coach for the Yankees who attended the game to scout both teams.

== Game 2 summary ==
Tuesday, October 2, 1951 1:30 pm (ET) at Polo Grounds in Manhattan, New York
Team	1	2	3	4	5	6	7	8	9	R	H	E
Brooklyn	2	0	0	0	1	3	2	0	2	10	13	2
New York	0	0	0	0	0	0	0	0	0	0	6	5
WP: Clem Labine (5–1) LP: Sheldon Jones (6–11); Home runs: BRO: Jackie Robinson (19), Gil Hodges (40), Andy Pafko (30), Rube Walker (4); NYG: None; Attendance: 38,609

The series moved to the Polo Grounds for game two. Sheldon Jones took the mound for the Giants despite a 6–10 record going into the game, allowing the Giants to save Sal Maglie for the series' game three or the first game of the World Series. The Dodgers used Clem Labine, a rookie who had started just six games for the Dodgers in his career, because they lacked pitchers who were ready for the game. The Yankees were among those in attendance as spectators.

Pee Wee Reese singled and Jackie Robinson homered, scoring two runs for the Dodgers in the first inning; the Giants had one player reach base on an error, making the score 2–0 after one inning. In the second inning, Gil Hodges singled and reached third base on an error, allowing the Dodgers to potentially score again. After Rube Walker's hit the Giants threw Hodges out at home plate, and two further outs ended their turn at bat. The Giants had two consecutive hits in their half, a double hit by Thomson and a single hit by Mays, but they failed to score as well after two groundouts, leaving the score 2–0. After one out, Duke Snider walked and Robinson singled to start the third inning, and Jones was removed from pitching duties, replaced by George Spencer.

Spencer ended the inning by throwing Snider out at home to keep the score 2–0. Eddie Stanky reached base after a Dodgers error, marking the second error for both teams; after another hit, the inning ended with a strikeout by Thomson. In the fourth inning, three players hit singles but did not score. Snider doubled in the fifth inning with one out, and a Jackie Robinson single made the score 3–0. The inning ended for the Dodgers on a double play, and Don Mueller hit a single in the bottom of the fifth before the Giants recorded three straight outs. The Dodgers opened up the game in the sixth inning, as Hodges led off with a home run. Billy Cox then reached base on an error and scored on a second error to make the game 5–0. After Labine walked to get on base, there was a rain delay, and play did not resume until that night.

After the game resumed, Labine scored on back-to-back singles by Reese and Snider. The Giants then came up to bat, failing to earn a hit as the score became 6–0 after six innings. To start the seventh inning, Al Corwin replaced Bill Rigney for the Giants, who had pinch hit for Spencer. Andy Pafko hit a home run to start the inning, and Hodges walked; he later scored on the fifth and final error made by the Giants to make the score 8–0. The bottom of the seventh and the eighth inning passed without a hit. In the ninth inning, Walker hit a home run, the fourth of the game, to make the score 10–0. The Giants failed to get a hit in the bottom of the ninth, ending the game. Labine pitched a six-hit shutout, not allowing a hit in the final four innings as the series went to a deciding third game.

== Game 3 summary ==
Wednesday, October 3, 1951 1:30 pm (ET) at Polo Grounds in Manhattan, New York
Team	1	2	3	4	5	6	7	8	9	R	H	E
Brooklyn	1	0	0	0	0	0	0	3	0	4	8	0
New York	0	0	0	0	0	0	1	0	4	5	8	0
WP: Larry Jansen (23–11) LP: Ralph Branca (13–12); Home runs: BRO: None; NYG: Bobby Thomson (32); Attendance: 34,320

Game three was also held at the Polo Grounds. With each team having won one game, it was time for a matchup between the two teams' ace pitchers. Sal Maglie was on the mound for New York, while Brooklyn called on Don Newcombe; both pitchers had winning records against the opposing team heading into the matchup. After Maglie walked two batters in the top of the first inning, Jackie Robinson singled, scoring Pee Wee Reese. No further hits were allowed until the bottom of the second, when Whitey Lockman and Bobby Thomson singled; neither scored, and it remained 1–0 through two innings.

Ironically, that potential rally in the first inning by the Giants was thwarted by a baserunning miscue by Bobby Thomson, who would later become the hero of the game. Trying to stretch a single into a double, Thomson didn't realize that Lockman had not advanced to third base. This led to two Giants baserunners being stuck at second and provided the Dodgers with an easy chance for an out.

The incident prompted Gordon McLendon on the Liberty Radio Network, which broadcast the game coast-to-coast, to draw comparisons between Bobby Thomson's baserunning gaffe and the infamous Merkle Boner, which cost the Giants the pennant in 1908, and baserunning antics of the allegedly inept Brooklyn Dodgers of the 1930s.

The game then became a pitcher's duel; Maglie and Newcombe did not allow a hit in the third or fourth innings. In the fifth, Billy Cox singled on a bunt, and Thomson hit a double, but the score remained 1–0 through five innings. Duke Snider singled in the sixth inning, but was caught stealing second. Neither team got another hit until the seventh inning. Rube Walker singled for the Dodgers, and Monte Irvin led off the bottom of the seventh with a double for the Giants. He reached third base after a bunt, and scored on a sacrifice fly by Thomson, tying the score at one run each.

In the top of the eighth, the Dodgers scored three runs off Maglie. Reese and Snider hit back-to-back singles, and Maglie threw a wild pitch, allowing Reese to score. After Robinson was walked, Andy Pafko hit a single to score Snider. Cox added another single to score Robinson, making the score 4–1 in favor of the Dodgers.

During this Dodgers rally, Thomson was once more at the center of attention, as both run-scoring hits in that inning were the results of groundballs hit towards him. Pafko's ball went off Thomson's glove into foul territory and Cox's two-out single went by Thomson into left field. The former hit was in fact deemed an error by radio announcer Gordon McLendon before the official scorer's decision of a hit was announced.

Newcombe got the Giants out in order in the bottom of the eighth, and Larry Jansen did the same in relief of Maglie in the top of the ninth.

Alvin Dark led off with a single in the bottom of the ninth, and Don Mueller followed with another. After Monte Irvin popped out to first base, Whitey Lockman hit a double to left-center field, scoring Dark and putting Mueller on third. Upon sliding into third, Mueller sprained his ankle and had to leave the game. As Mueller went to the locker room, Dodgers manager Chuck Dressen summoned game 1 starter Ralph Branca in to relieve Newcombe on only one day's rest. Bobby Thomson came up to bat, and on Branca's second pitch, Thomson drove the ball to deep left field for a walk-off home run to win the pennant for the Giants. This home run came to be known as the "Shot Heard 'Round the World" as the Giants won the National League pennant, advancing to the World Series.

== Aftermath ==
The following day, sportswriter Red Smith opened his recap of the game for the New York Herald Tribune with the following lead: "Now it is done. Now the story ends. And there is no way to tell it. The art of fiction is dead. Reality has strangled invention. Only the utterly impossible, the inexpressibly fantastic, can ever be plausible again." After winning the pennant, the Giants lost to the Yankees in the World Series four games to two. The Brooklyn Dodgers rebounded to win the National League pennant in 1952, but lost the 1952 World Series to the Yankees four games to three.

The three games counted statistically as regular season games. As a result, Hodges and Furillo led the league with 157 games played, which could not have been equaled by anyone but a Brooklyn or New York player. Monte Irvin increased his runs batted in total to 121, leading the NL that year. Larry Jansen's win in the final game gave him 23 wins on the year, tying him for the MLB lead with Maglie. Newcombe's two strikeouts in game three totalled 164 on the season for him, tying him for the NL lead with Warren Spahn and the MLB lead with Spahn and Vic Raschi. Campanella finished the season with a .325 batting average, 33 doubles, 33 home runs, and 108 runs batted in, and won the Major League Baseball Most Valuable Player Award at the end of the season. Mays finished the season with a .274 batting average, 22 doubles, and 20 home runs in 121 games, and won the Major League Baseball Rookie of the Year Award.

In 2001, Journalist Joshua Prager published that the Giants secretly learned opponents' finger signals, when several players told The Wall Street Journal that beginning on July 20, 1951, the team used a telescope and buzzer wire to steal the finger signals of opposing catchers careless enough to leave their signs unprotected. Giants catcher Sal Yvars told Prager that he relayed to Thomson the stolen sign for Branca's fastball. Thomson always insisted that he had no foreknowledge of Branca's pitch. Branca had been aware of the rumors and was skeptical of Thomson's denial, but later told The New York Times in 2001, "I didn't want to diminish a legendary moment in baseball. And even if Bobby knew what was coming, he had to hit it.... Knowing the pitch doesn't always help."

== Quotes ==
- Russ Hodges on WMCA

Bobby Thomson... up there swingin'... He's had two out of three, a single and a double, and Billy Cox is playing him right on the third-base line... One out, last of the ninth... Branca pitches... Bobby Thomson takes a strike called on the inside corner... Bobby hitting at .292... He's had a single and a double and he drove in the Giants' first run with a long fly to center... Brooklyn leads it 4–2...Hartung down the line at third not taking any chances... Lockman with not too big of a lead at second, but he'll be runnin' like the wind if Thomson hits one... Branca throws... [audible sound of bat meeting ball]

There's a long drive... it's gonna be, I believe...THE GIANTS WIN THE PENNANT!! THE GIANTS WIN THE PENNANT! THE GIANTS WIN THE PENNANT! THE GIANTS WIN THE PENNANT! Bobby Thomson hits into the lower deck of the left-field stands! The Giants win the pennant and they're goin' crazy, they're goin' crazy! HEEEY-OH!!!'' [ten-second pause for crowd noise]

I don't believe it! I don't believe it! I do not believe it! Bobby Thomson... hit a line drive... into the lower deck... of the left-field stands... and this blame place is goin' crazy! The Giants! Horace Stoneham has got a winner! The Giants won it... by a score of 5 to 4... and they're pickin' Bobby Thomson up... and carryin' him off the field!
