= Hank Schenz =

American baseball player (1919–1988)

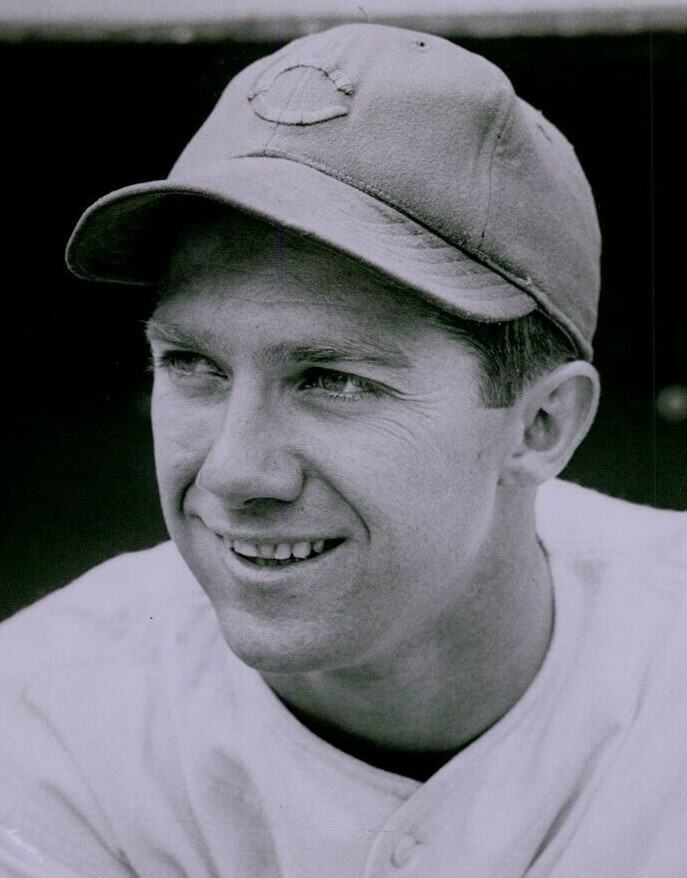
- Second baseman
- Born: April 11, 1919; New Richmond, Ohio, U.S.
- Died: May 12, 1988 (aged 69); Cincinnati, Ohio, U.S.
- Batted: Right Threw: Right

MLB debut
- September 18, 1946, for the Chicago Cubs

Last MLB appearance
- September 13, 1951, for the New York Giants

MLB statistics
- Batting average: .247
- Home runs: 2
- Runs batted in: 24
- Stats at Baseball Reference

Teams
- Chicago Cubs (1946–1949); Pittsburgh Pirates (1950–1951); New York Giants (1951)

Henry Leonard Schenz (April 11, 1919 – May 12, 1988) was an American professional baseball player whose career lasted 14 seasons (1939–1942; 1946–1955), including all or parts of six years in Major League Baseball as a member of the Chicago Cubs (1946–1949), Pittsburgh Pirates (1950–1951) and New York Giants (1951). An infielder, Schenz primarily played second base and was known for his competitive nature and prowess as a bench jockey. The native of New Richmond, Ohio, threw and batted right-handed. He stood 5 feet 9 inches (1.75 m) tall and weighed 175 pounds (79 kg).

== Baseball career ==
Schenz' minor-league apprenticeship was interrupted by three years of World War II service in the United States Navy. Returning to the game in 1946 at age 27, he spent most of that year with the Tulsa Oilers of the Double-A Texas League, where he batted .333 with 180 hits and was selected the loop's Most Valuable Player. In September, he was recalled to the parent Cubs and played in six late-season games, with two hits in 11 at bats. The 1947 campaign saw Schenz back in the minors, this time with the Nashville Vols of the Double-A Southern Association (hitting .331 in 99 games). The Cubs gave him a brief look in two stints, one in April and the other in September, but he collected only one hit in 14 at bats.

In 1948, he finally spent a full year at the MLB level. In what would be his best Major League season, Schenz appeared in 86 games for the 1948 Cubs, starting 71 games at second base and five at third, logging 337 at bats, and batting .261. But he failed to stick in Chicago. In 1949, after using him in only seven early-season games, the Cubs traded him to the Brooklyn Dodgers on May 16. He spent the rest of 1949 with the Triple-A St. Paul Saints, where, again, he hit well, batting .345 with 178 hits. The performance impressed the Pittsburgh Pirates, who purchased Schenz' contract and used him as a utility infielder from 1950 through June of 1951, when they placed him on waivers.

=== Alleged role in sign stealing (1951) ===
Claimed by the New York Giants on June 30, Schenz seemingly played no part in the 1951 Giants' furious, and now famous, late-season surge. He appeared in only eight regular-season games as a Giant, all as a pinch runner, and scored one run, on July 6. Meanwhile, the Giants won 37 of their last 44 games, including 20 of 23 at home, to overcome the Dodgers' mid-August 131/2-game lead, tie them at the close of the regular season, and defeat them in the final inning of the decisive third game of the 1951 National League tie-breaker series.

However, a decade after the 1951 season, word began leaking out that the Giants' winning streak coincided with their adoption of using a telescopic spyglass to steal opposing catchers' signs from their center-field clubhouse at their home field, the Polo Grounds. The spyglass belonged to Schenz, who had also employed it to steal signs for the Cubs and brought it with him to the Giants. It was in use on October 3, 1951—allegedly operated by Giants coach Herman Franks—when Bobby Thomson hit one of the most dramatic home runs in baseball history: his "Shot Heard 'Round the World" that delivered a come-from-behind, walk-off, 5–4 triumph over the Dodgers and a National League pennant for the Giants.

The sign-stealing rumors began to gain credence in 1991, three years after Schenz' 1988 death, when one of the 1951 Giants, reserve catcher Sal Yvars, confirmed the accusation in The Home Run Heard Round the World, by Ray Robinson. Then, in January 2001, journalist Joshua Prager revealed details of the spying plot in The Wall Street Journal, and followed with a full account in his 2006 book The Echoing Green. For his WSJ article, Prager interviewed 22 living players, including Thomson, who, although not denying that the Giants stole signs in 1951, said he ignored purloined intelligence when he batted (he found it distracting) and a stolen signal did not lead to his famous blast. In addition, the Giants posted a 17–4 record in visiting ballparks during their remarkable skein, where Schenz' spyglass would have been harder to employ.

However, the telescopic device was influential, according to one 1951 Giant, Spider Jorgensen, who told Prager: “Yeah, we stole signs. Hank Schenz had a telescope that could see the spots on the moon … I was like, ‘Wow, this is amazing.’”

Schenz appeared as a pinch runner in one game of the 1951 World Series, which the Giants lost to the New York Yankees in six games. He then disappeared back into the minor leagues, playing for four more seasons, including a return to Tulsa as player-manager in 1955. He batted .247 in 207 games during his MLB career; his 133 hits included 22 doubles, three triples and two home runs; he was credited with 24 runs batted in. He died in Cincinnati, aged 69.

== See also ==
- Shot Heard 'Round the World (baseball)
