= Sheldon Jones =

American baseball player (1922–1991)

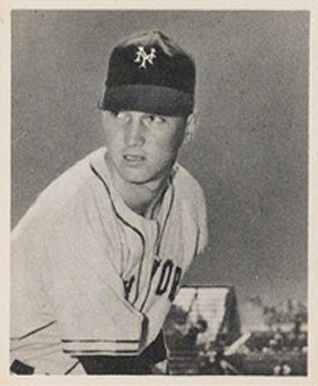
- Jones circa 1948
- Pitcher
- Born: February 2, 1922; Tecumseh, Nebraska, U.S.
- Died: April 18, 1991 (aged 69); Greenville, North Carolina, U.S.
- Batted: Right Threw: Right

MLB debut
- September 9, 1946, for the New York Giants

Last MLB appearance
- June 28, 1953, for the Chicago Cubs

MLB statistics
- Win–loss record: 54–57
- Earned run average: 3.96
- Strikeouts: 413
- Stats at Baseball Reference

Teams
- New York Giants (1946–1951); Boston Braves (1952); Chicago Cubs (1953)

Sheldon Leslie "Available" Jones (February 2, 1922 – April 18, 1991) was an American professional baseball player, a right-handed pitcher who played in the Major Leagues from 1946 through 1953 for the New York Giants, Boston Braves and Chicago Cubs. He earned his nickname from a character in the Li'l Abner comic strip and because of his durability as both a starting pitcher and a reliever early in his MLB career as a member of the Giants. The native of Tecumseh, Nebraska, stood 6 feet (1.8 m) tall and weighed 180 pounds (82 kg).

Jones' professional career began in 1941 and was interrupted by three years of service (1943–45) in the United States Army Air Forces during World War II. When he returned to baseball after the war, he posted back-to-back stellar seasons in the minor leagues, winning 32 of 44 decisions in 1946–47 before his permanent recall to the Giants.

In 1948, Jones appeared in 55 games played (fourth that season among National League pitchers), 21 as a starter and 34 in relief, worked in 201 1/3 innings, and won 16 of 24 decisions, with five saves and eight complete games, while posting a earned run average of 3.35. The following year, 1949, Jones was mostly a starter (27 of his 42 games). He appeared in 207 1/3 innings, won 15, lost 12, and had 11 complete games. He registered no saves, but still finished nine games, and lowered his ERA to 3.34. Finally, in 1950, Jones worked in 40 games, 28 as a starter. He logged 199 innings, 11 more complete games and two saves. He posted a losing record (13–16) and a 4.61 ERA.

Jones pitched one more season in New York as a member of the 1951 National League pennant winners. In the 1951 World Series, Jones appeared in two contests and saved Game 3 for Giants' starter Jim Hearn. In World Series play, he allowed one run in 41/3 innings pitched, posting an earned run average of 2.08, against the eventual champion New York Yankees.

Jones wrapped up his MLB career with 61 games played, mostly in relief, for the Braves and Cubs. All told he surrendered 909 hits and 413 bases on balls (and amassed the same number of strikeouts) in 920 innings pitched during his Major League tenure. Of his 260 games pitched, 101 were as a starter and 159 came in relief. He finished with 12 saves.
