= Jack Maguire (baseball) =

American baseball player (1925–2001)

- Outfielder / Utility infielder
- Born: February 5, 1925; St. Louis, Missouri, U.S.
- Died: September 28, 2001 (aged 76); Kerrville, Texas, U.S.
- Batted: Right Threw: Right

MLB debut
- April 18, 1950, for the New York Giants

Last MLB appearance
- September 9, 1951, for the St. Louis Browns

MLB statistics
- Batting average: .240
- Home runs: 2
- Runs batted in: 21
- Stats at Baseball Reference

Teams
- New York Giants (1950–1951); Pittsburgh Pirates (1951); St. Louis Browns (1951)

Jack Maguire (February 5, 1925 – September 28, 2001) was an American professional baseball player whose career lasted for eight seasons (1943; 1946–52). He played in 94 Major League games as an outfielder and utility infielder for the New York Giants, Pittsburgh Pirates and St. Louis Browns in 1950–51. A native of St. Louis, Missouri, Maguire threw and batted right-handed. He stood 5 feet 11 inches (1.80 m) tall and weighed 165 pounds (75 kg).

Maguire spent five seasons in the Giants' farm system before seeing his two full years of Major League service. He logged 30 games played as a left fielder, 13 as a right fielder, six games as a third baseman, three as a second baseman, and two as a first baseman. His 46 hits included five doubles, two triples and two home runs. He saw the most playing time as a member of his hometown Browns during the closing months of the 1951 season. Maguire started 30 games as a left fielder or third baseman, and had nine multi-hit games, including three-hit efforts against the Boston Red Sox and New York Yankees on consecutive days, August 2–3.

As a youth growing up in St. Louis, Maguire gave Yogi Berra his famous nickname. One afternoon, after attending a movie that had a short piece on India, Maguire noticed a resemblance between Berra and the "yogi", or person who practiced yoga, on the screen. Maguire said "I’m going to call you Yogi" and from that moment on, the name stuck.

Maguire also wore uniform #24 of the Giants from 1950 through May 23, 1951, his final game with the club. Rookie centerfielder Willie Mays, recalled from Triple-A, made his MLB debut two days later, on May 25, wearing #14 but he soon inherited 24, and famously wore it for the rest of his Hall of Fame career.
