= Rube Walker =

American baseball player and coach (1926–1992)

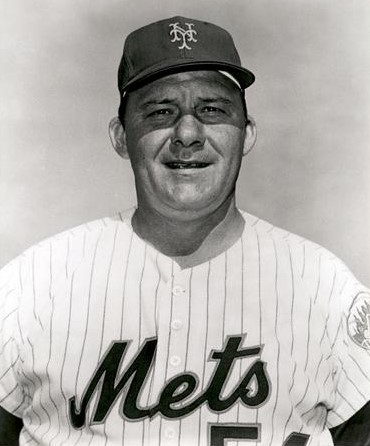
- Walker as pitching coach of the Mets
- Catcher
- Born: May 16, 1926; Lenoir, North Carolina, U.S.
- Died: December 12, 1992 (aged 66); Morganton, North Carolina, U.S.
- Batted: Left Threw: Right

MLB debut
- April 20, 1948, for the Chicago Cubs

Last MLB appearance
- June 15, 1958, for the Los Angeles Dodgers

MLB statistics
- Batting average: .227
- Home runs: 35
- Runs batted in: 192
- Stats at Baseball Reference

Teams
- Chicago Cubs (1948–1951); Brooklyn / Los Angeles Dodgers (1951–1958)

Career highlights and awards
- 2× World Series champion (1955, 1969)

Albert Bluford "Rube" Walker (May 16, 1926 – December 12, 1992) was an American Major League Baseball (MLB) catcher and longtime pitching coach.

== Career ==
A native of Lenoir, North Carolina, Walker batted left-handed, threw right-handed and was listed as 6 feet (1.8 m) tall and 170 pounds (77 kg) during his playing career. He was signed by the Chicago Cubs' organization in 1944 and spent four full years in their farm system, where he was the All-Star catcher in the Class B Three-I League (1946) and the Double-A Southern Association (1947).

=== Catcher ===
He made his major league debut with the Cubs on April 20, 1948, and spent 11 years in the National League as a second-string catcher. He appeared in 608 games played over that span, and his 50 games started as a catcher with the 1950 Cubs were the most of his big-league career. The following season, on June 15, 1951, he was involved in a blockbuster trade with the Brooklyn Dodgers, in which the league-leading Dodgers obtained the Cubs' slugging outfielder, Andy Pafko. But when injury sidelined Brooklyn's Hall of Fame catcher, Roy Campanella, Walker was behind the plate in the deciding game of the 1951 National League tie-breaker series on October 3, 1951, when Bobby Thomson hit the "Shot Heard 'Round the World," costing the Dodgers the pennant.

Walker then backed up Campanella for the next six seasons, the Dodgers' last years in Brooklyn. Over that time, they won four National League titles but Walker appeared in only one World Series, in 1956 against the New York Yankees. He went hitless in two at bats as a pinch hitter. The previous season, Walker was a member of Brooklyn's only world championship team; that year he appeared in 48 regular-season games as Campanella's backup and batted .252.

After retiring as an active player in June 1958, Walker served out the season as a Los Angeles Dodgers' coach. He finished his MLB career with 360 hits, including 69 doubles and 35 home runs. He batted .227 lifetime.

=== Coach ===
Walker then was a minor league manager for six seasons. He helmed the unaffiliated Houston Buffs of the American Association for part of 1959, then managed at Double-A in the Dodgers' and Yankees' farm systems from 1960 through 1964. After 1965 he was a pitching coach for the Washington Senators, New York Mets and Atlanta Braves, working closely with managers Gil Hodges, Yogi Berra and Joe Torre, among others.

Walker was the Mets' pitching coach for 14 seasons, from 1968 through 1981, including service on the 1969 World Champion "Amazin'" Mets. He also served as the club's emergency manager from September 25–29, 1968, after Hodges suffered a mild heart attack and went on medical leave for the final four games of the season; under Walker, the Mets were 2–2. As the Mets' pitching coach, he supervised Hall of Famers Tom Seaver and Nolan Ryan. Walker scouted for the Braves and St. Louis Cardinals after his coaching career ended.

== Legacy and family ==
The book Carl Erskine's Tales from the Dodgers Dugout: Extra Innings (2004) includes short stories from the former Dodger pitcher. Walker is prominent in many of these stories.

A younger brother, Verlon "Rube" Walker, was nicknamed after him; Verlon was a minor league catcher and manager who served for ten years (from 1961 until his death in March 1971) as a coach for the Cubs.

== Death ==
Rube Walker died from lung cancer on December 12, 1992, in Morganton, North Carolina at age 66. He is interred at Blue Ridge Memorial Park, Lenoir, North Carolina.

== Popular culture ==
In the 1985 film Mask, Rocky Dennis states he is in need of a Rube "Ruby" Walker baseball card to complete his 1955 Brooklyn Dodgers set.

Preceded by Sid Hudson	Washington Senators Pitching Coach; 1965–1967	Succeeded by Sid Hudson
Preceded by Harvey Haddix	New York Mets Pitching Coach; 1968–1981	Succeeded by Bill Monbouquette
Preceded by Cloyd Boyer	Atlanta Braves Pitching Coach; 1982–1984	Succeeded by Johnny Sain
