= Con Dempsey =

American baseball player (1922–2006)

- Pitcher
- Born: September 16, 1922; San Francisco, California, U.S.
- Died: August 5, 2006 (aged 83); Redwood City, California, U.S.
- Batted: Right Threw: Right

MLB debut
- April 28, 1951, for the Pittsburgh Pirates

Last MLB appearance
- May 5, 1951, for the Pittsburgh Pirates

MLB statistics
- Win–loss record: 0–2
- Earned run average: 9.00
- Strikeouts: 3
- Innings pitched: 7
- Stats at Baseball Reference

Teams
- Pittsburgh Pirates (1951)

Cornelius Francis Dempsey Jr. (September 16, 1922 – August 5, 2006) was an American professional baseball player. A right-handed pitcher from the San Francisco Bay Area, he had a brief audition in Major League Baseball in 1951 as a member of the Pittsburgh Pirates. Most of his six-year pro career was spent in the top-level Pacific Coast League, where the sidearmer was the strikeout champion in both 1948 and 1949. He stood 6 feet 4 inches (1.93 m) tall and weighed 190 pounds (86 kg).

Born in San Francisco, Dempsey graduated from Sequoia High School (Redwood City, California), then the University of San Francisco (USF), where he played baseball and basketball. With the outbreak of World War II, he joined the United States Navy, serving in the Pacific and European theaters; he was awarded four medals for bravery.

Dempsey began his professional baseball career during the postwar era at age 24, winning 16 games in 1947 in the Class C Pioneer League, then joining his hometown San Francisco Seals of the Pacific Coast League in 1948. As a PCL rookie in 1948, he again won 16 games (losing 11), and led the league in strikeouts (171) and earned run average (2.10). Then, in 1949, he won 17 of 31 decisions for the Seals, and again led the PCL in strikeouts (164), although his ERA rose to 4.23. Dempsey moved to the Seals' bullpen in 1950, splitting 18 decisions. Although his ERA remained high (4.36) his contract was purchased on a conditional basis by the Pirates during the 1950–51 offseason.

At spring training with the Pirates in 1951, Dempsey was convinced to change his delivery from sidearm to overhand by the Pirates' general manager, Branch Rickey. Dempsey, now 28, made Pittsburgh's opening-season, 28-man roster. But his new overhand delivery was not effective. Given two starting assignments, on April 28 against the Cincinnati Reds and May 4 against the New York Giants, he absorbed two losses and was able last only five total innings pitched. In the latter game, he surrendered home runs to both Bobby Thomson and Hank Thompson. After two innings of mop-up relief on May 5, in which he allowed no runs on two hits, Dempsey was returned to the Seals, where he finished the 1951 campaign. He sat out the 1952 season, then pitched one final year (1953) in the PCL with the cross-bay Oakland Oaks before retiring from pro baseball.

As a major leaguer, he allowed 11 hits and seven earned runs in seven full innings pitched; he issued four bases on balls and struck out three.

Dempsey returned to USF to earn a master's degree in education, then began a 34-year career as a teacher and coach in San Francisco's public school system. He was the first baseball player elected to USF's Athletics Hall of Fame. He died in Redwood City from pneumonia at the age of 83.
