= Dick Bokelmann =

American baseball player (1926–2019)

- Pitcher
- Born: October 26, 1926; Arlington Heights, Illinois, U.S.
- Died: December 27, 2019 (aged 93); Arlington Heights, Illinois, U.S.
- Batted: Right Threw: Right

MLB debut
- August 3, 1951, for the St. Louis Cardinals

Last MLB appearance
- May 3, 1953, for the St. Louis Cardinals

MLB statistics
- Win–loss record: 3–4
- Earned run average: 4.90
- Strikeouts: 27
- Stats at Baseball Reference

Teams
- St. Louis Cardinals (1951–1953)

Richard Werner Bokelmann (October 26, 1926 – December 27, 2019) was an American Major League Baseball pitcher who played for the St. Louis Cardinals from 1951 to 1953, making a total of 34 appearances, which included one start.

Bokelmann died December 27, 2019.
