= Monte Kennedy =

American baseball player (1922-1997)

- Pitcher
- Born: May 11, 1922; Amelia, Virginia, U.S.
- Died: March 1, 1997 (aged 74); Midlothian, Virginia, U.S.
- Batted: Right Threw: Left

MLB debut
- April 18, 1946, for the New York Giants

Last MLB appearance
- September 12, 1953, for the New York Giants

MLB statistics
- Win–loss record: 42–55
- Earned run average: 3.84
- Strikeouts: 411
- Stats at Baseball Reference

Teams
- New York Giants (1946–1953)

Montia Calvin Kennedy (May 11, 1922 – March 1, 1997) was an American professional baseball player, a left-handed pitcher who appeared in the Major Leagues from 1946 to 1953 for the New York Giants. A native of Amelia, Virginia, Kennedy stood 6 feet 2 inches (1.88 m) tall and weighed 185 pounds (84 kg). He was a United States Army veteran of World War II.

Kennedy worked in 249 games over his MLB career, 127 as a starting pitcher. In his rookie campaign in 1946 he led the National League in bases on balls, with 116 in 186 2/3 innings pitched. Towards the end of his career, he became a swing man, appearing as a relief pitcher and spot starter. He was a member of the 1951 Giants, the team that overcame a 13 1/2-game deficit on August 11 to tie the Brooklyn Dodgers and force a three-game playoff. While Kennedy did not appear in the playoff (he last pitched on September 20), he contributed to the Giant cause during their surge by allowing only one earned run in 7 1/3 innings of relief over five games.

The Giants famously won the 1951 pennant on Bobby Thomson's three-run "walk off" home run to make the 1951 World Series against the New York Yankees. Kennedy appeared in two games in relief in the Fall Classic. He pitched a 1-2-3 ninth inning in Game 4, striking out Joe DiMaggio and Gene Woodling, but the following day, relieving starting pitcher Larry Jansen in Game 5, he surrendered a two-run home run to Phil Rizzuto. The Yankees won both games, as they took the Series' final three contests to come from behind to defeat the Giants in six games.

During his regular season MLB career, Kennedy allowed 928 hits and 495 bases on balls in 961 innings pitched, with 411 strikeouts. In the World Series, he compiled a 6.00 earned run average, allowing two earned runs in his three innings pitched.

Monty Kennedy worked for the Richmond Police Department until his retirement. He died in Midlothian, Virginia, at age 74.
