= Wes Westrum =

American baseball player, coach, manager, and scout (1922–2002)

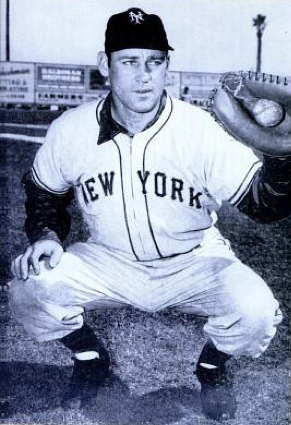
- Westrum with the New York Giants in 1955
- Catcher / Manager
- Born: November 28, 1922; Clearbrook, Minnesota, U.S.
- Died: May 28, 2002 (aged 79); Clearbrook, Minnesota, U.S.
- Batted: Right Threw: Right

MLB debut
- September 17, 1947, for the New York Giants

Last MLB appearance
- September 29, 1957, for the New York Giants

MLB statistics
- Batting average: .217
- Home runs: 96
- Runs batted in: 315
- Managerial record: 260–366
- Winning %: .415
- Stats at Baseball Reference
- Managerial record at Baseball Reference

Teams
- As player: New York Giants (1947–1957); As manager: New York Mets (1965–1967); San Francisco Giants (1974–1975)

Career highlights and awards
- 2× All-Star (1952, 1953); World Series champion (1954)

Wesley Noreen Westrum (November 28, 1922 – May 28, 2002) was an American professional baseball player, coach, manager, and scout. He played for 11 seasons as a catcher in Major League Baseball for the New York Giants from 1947 to 1957 and was known as a superb defensive receiver. He served as the second manager in the history of the New York Mets, replacing Casey Stengel in 1965 after the latter fractured his hip and was forced to retire.

== Major League playing career ==
A native of Clearbrook, Minnesota, Westrum was, in addition to his defensive prowess, a powerful right-handed hitter in his prime, although he had trouble making contact and hit for a low .217 career batting average. He began his major league career as the Giants' reserve catcher, playing behind Walker Cooper. When Cooper was traded in 1949, Westrum shared the catching duties with Ray Mueller for the remainder of the season. He became the full-time catcher for the Giants in 1950, leading National League catchers with a .999 fielding percentage, 31 baserunners caught stealing, a 54.4% caught stealing percentage and 71 assists, and finished second to Roy Campanella with 608 putouts.

Westrum was a key player for the Giants’ during the remarkable 1951 pennant race in which the Giants, 13 games behind the Brooklyn Dodgers on August 12, fought back to win 16 games in a row and finished the season tied with the Dodgers for first place. His two-run, eighth-inning home run against Ralph Branca on August 13 snapped a 1–1 tie and gave the Giants a 3–1 victory over the Dodgers. Westrum contributed 20 home runs with 70 runs batted in, and led National League catchers in baserunners caught stealing. The two teams met in the 1951 National League tie-breaker series in which the Giants' season was climaxed by Bobby Thomson's Shot Heard 'Round the World, a three-run home run in the bottom of the ninth inning for a 5–4 win of the third and final playoff game. Afterwards, the Giants would lose to the New York Yankees in the 1951 World Series.

His 1952 season was plagued by injuries and he only managed to hit for a .220 batting average in 114 games, although he still managed to finish second to Del Rice among catchers in assists. Westrum remained the Giants' starting catcher throughout the 1954 season, catching all four games in the 1954 World Series against the Cleveland Indians. Injuries continued to take their toll, and by 1955, Ray Katt had replaced him as the starting catcher. Westrum lasted three more seasons but never played more than 70 games a year. On September 29, 1957, manager Bill Rigney started all the Giants who had been on the 1954 World Series team in the ballclub's final game at the Polo Grounds; Westrum caught during the 9–1 loss to Pittsburgh. When the Giants moved to San Francisco in 1958, he was offered a role as a third-string catcher or as a coach. He decided to retire as a player at the age of 34, and accepted the coaching job.

== Career statistics ==
Westrum, along with third baseman Eddie Mathews and umpire Augie Donatelli, appears on the first issue of Sports Illustrated, August 1954

In his biography of Willie Mays, entitled Willie Mays: The Life, The Legend, writer James S. Hirsch described Westrum as being "built like a block of granite" and praised his defensive abilities.

In an eleven-year major league career, Westrum played in 919 games, accumulating 503 hits in 2,322 at bats for a .217 career batting average along with 96 home runs, 315 runs batted in, and a .356 on-base percentage. He ended his career with a .985 fielding percentage. He made the National League All-Star teams in 1952 and 1953.

In the 1950 season, Westrum committed only one error in 139 games played, and had 21 double plays, the 11th highest season total for a catcher. His .999 fielding percentage for that season stood as a National League record for catchers, until it was surpassed by Charles Johnson in 1997. Westrum's 49.29% career caught stealing percentage ranks 21st all-time among major league catchers. He played more games as a catcher than any other player in Giants history (902).

Westrum was pictured on the cover of the first issue of Sports Illustrated on August 16, 1954, along with Milwaukee Braves star Eddie Mathews and umpire Augie Donatelli.

== Coach and manager ==
Westrum served as the Giants' bullpen coach and then became their first base coach through the 1963 season. He joined the Mets as a coach in 1964, working at first base and then in the bullpen, and became pitching coach on July 14, 1965, after the release of pitcher-coach Warren Spahn. But only 11 days later, Westrum was named the Mets' interim manager when Stengel, 75, fractured his left hip getting out of a car on July 25. On that day, the Mets were 31–64, in tenth and last place in the National League. They fared no better under Westrum for the rest of 1965, losing 48 of the 67 games under his leadership. The hip fracture would end Stengel's Hall of Fame managerial career.

Westrum then was appointed the second full-time manager of the perennial last-place club. But his 1966 Mets escaped the basement for the first time in the Mets' five-year history when they finished ninth, one notch above the cellar, posting a record of 66 wins and 95 losses, a 16-game improvement over the previous season. The Mets were slowly developing an array of young pitchers in the minor leagues; however, apart from Tom Seaver, none arrived in time to help Westrum in 1967, when New York again finished tenth and last. Westrum resigned with 11 games to go in the season. Coach Salty Parker took over the team for the remaining games of the 1967 season, and Gil Hodges was named manager for 1968.

Westrum then rejoined the Giants as a coach (1968–71) and scout. They eventually gave him a second managing opportunity on June 28, 1974, when he succeeded Charlie Fox with the club in fifth place. He was not able to post a winning record in his 1½ years as San Francisco's manager, although he came close when his team finished one game under .500 in 1975 and in third place in the National League Western Division. That marked his last year as a major league manager, although Westrum stayed in the game as a scout for the Atlanta Braves for many years. His final record as a manager: 260 wins and 366 losses (.415).

Westrum died from cancer at the age of 79 in Clearbrook, Minnesota on May 28, 2002.

== See also ==
- List of Major League Baseball players who spent their entire career with one franchise

== Bibliography ==
- Hirsch, James S. (2010). Willie Mays: The Life, the Legend. New York: Scribner. ISBN 978-1-4165-4790-7.

Preceded by Cookie Lavagetto	New York Mets first base coach 1964	Succeeded by Yogi Berra
Preceded by Sheriff Robinson	New York Mets bullpen coach 1965	Succeeded by Sheriff Robinson
Preceded by Warren Spahn	New York Mets pitching coach 1965	Succeeded by Harvey Haddix
