= 1951 World Series =

1951 Major League Baseball championship series

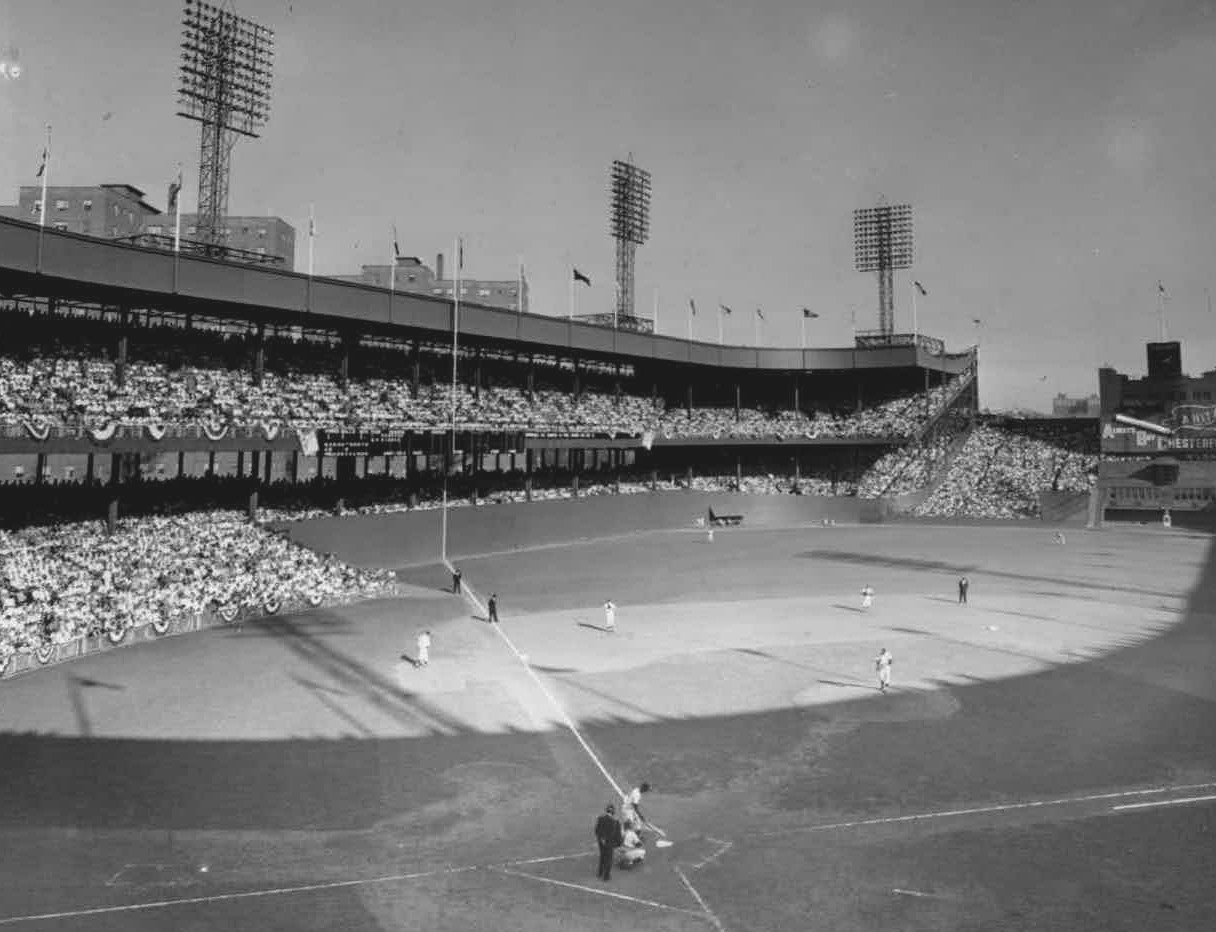
Team (Wins)	Managers	Season
New York Yankees (4)	Casey Stengel	98–56, .636, GA: 5
New York Giants (2)	Leo Durocher	98–59, .624, GA: 1
- Dates: October 4–10
- Venue(s): Yankee Stadium (New York Yankees); Polo Grounds (New York Giants)
- Umpires: Bill Summers (AL), Lee Ballanfant (NL), Joe Paparella (AL), Al Barlick (NL), Johnny Stevens (AL: outfield only), Artie Gore (NL: outfield only)
- Hall of Famers: Umpire: Al Barlick; Yankees: Casey Stengel (manager); Bill Dickey (coach); Yogi Berra; Joe DiMaggio; Mickey Mantle; Johnny Mize; Phil Rizzuto; Giants: Leo Durocher (manager); Monte Irvin; Willie Mays

Broadcast
- Television: NBC
- TV announcers: Jim Britt and Russ Hodges
- Radio: Mutual
- Radio announcers: Mel Allen and Al Helfer

In the Series, the Yankees showed some power of their own, including Gil McDougald's grand slam home run in Game 5, at the Polo Grounds. The Yankees won the Series in six games, for their third straight title and 14th overall. This would be the last World Series for Joe DiMaggio, who retired afterward, and the first for rookies Willie Mays and Mickey Mantle.

This was the last Subway Series the Giants played in. Both teams would meet again eleven years later after the Giants relocated to San Francisco. They have not played a World Series against each other since. This was the first World Series announced by Bob Sheppard, who was in his first year as Yankee Stadium's public address announcer. It was also the first World Series to be televised exclusively by one network (NBC) as well as the first to be televised nationwide, as coaxial cable had recently linked both coasts.

== Background ==
This World Series also matched up two of the league's strongest managers, Casey Stengel of the Yankees and Leo Durocher of the Giants.

This was the 13th appearance by the Giants in Series play, their ninth loss, and their first appearance since the 1937 World Series.

"The Commerce Comet arrives on the final voyage of the Yankee Clipper." (On the Yankees' side, the 1951 World Series was the first for Mickey Mantle and the final for Joe DiMaggio.)

Mantle's bad luck with injuries in the Major Leagues began here. In the fifth inning of Game 2 at Yankee Stadium, Mays flied to deep right center. DiMaggio and Mantle converged on the ball, DiMaggio called Mantle off, and Mantle stutter-stepped, catching a cleat in a drain cover, and fell to the ground in a heap with a wrenched knee as DiMaggio made the catch. Mantle was done for this Series, but would come back to play many more.

New York City became the first city to host an NBA Finals and a World Series in the same calendar year.

== Summary ==
AL New York Yankees (4) vs. NL New York Giants (2)

Game	Date	Score	Location	Time	Attendance
1	October 4	New York Giants – 5, New York Yankees – 1	Yankee Stadium	2:58	65,673
2	October 5	New York Giants – 1, New York Yankees – 3	Yankee Stadium	2:05	66,018
3	October 6	New York Yankees – 2, New York Giants – 6	Polo Grounds	2:42	52,035
4	October 8†	New York Yankees – 6, New York Giants – 2	Polo Grounds	2:57	49,010
5	October 9	New York Yankees – 13, New York Giants – 1	Polo Grounds	2:31	47,530
6	October 10	New York Giants – 3, New York Yankees – 4	Yankee Stadium	2:59	61,711

== Matchups ==
=== Game 1 ===
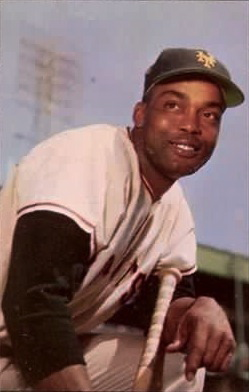
Monte Irvin

October 4, 1951 1:00 pm (ET) at Yankee Stadium in Bronx, New York
Team	1	2	3	4	5	6	7	8	9	R	H	E
New York (NL)	2	0	0	0	0	3	0	0	0	5	10	1
New York (AL)	0	1	0	0	0	0	0	0	0	1	7	1
WP: Dave Koslo (1–0) LP: Allie Reynolds (0–1); Home runs: NYG: Alvin Dark (1); NYY: None

Monte Irvin's daring baserunning got the Giants off to a fast start in this New York – New York series. He singled in the first inning, sped to third on Whitey Lockman's RBI single, then stole home off Yankee starter Allie Reynolds. The Yankees cut the Giants' lead to 2–1 in the second when Gil McDougald doubled with one out off Dave Koslo and scored on Jerry Coleman's single. The scored remained that way until the sixth when Alvin Dark's three-run home run gave the Giants a commanding 5–1 lead. Koslo pitched a complete game to give the Giants a 1–0 series lead.

=== Game 2 ===
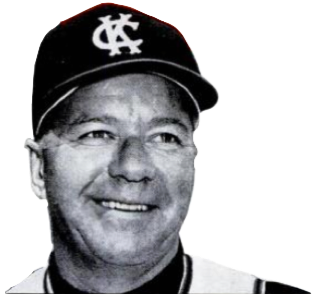
Eddie Lopat

October 5, 1951 1:00 pm (ET) at Yankee Stadium in Bronx, New York
Team	1	2	3	4	5	6	7	8	9	R	H	E
New York (NL)	0	0	0	0	0	0	1	0	0	1	5	1
New York (AL)	1	1	0	0	0	0	0	1	X	3	6	0
WP: Eddie Lopat (1–0) LP: Larry Jansen (0–1); Home runs: NYG: None; NYY: Joe Collins (1)

The first three batters Larry Jansen faced were Mickey Mantle, Phil Rizzuto, and Gil McDougald, all of whom singled for a quick 1-0 Yankee lead. It could have been worse, but the next batter Joe DiMaggio bounced into a 6-4-3 double play and Yogi Berra struck out. The next inning, Joe Collins's home run extended the Yankees' lead to 2–0. In the fifth Willie Mays flied out to Joe DiMaggio, who waved off right fielder Mantle, who got his spikes caught in an exposed drain and injured his knee and had to leave the game. This injury would stick with him for the rest of his career. Monte Irvin scored in the seventh, tagging and coming home on pinch-hitter Bill Rigney's bases-loaded sacrifice fly, as the Giants got within 2–1. But winning pitcher Eddie Lopat, who pitched a complete game, helped himself to an insurance run with an RBI single in the eighth after Bobby Brown hit a leadoff single and moved to second on a groundout off George Spencer. The Yankees' 3–1 win tied the series shifting to the Polo Grounds.

=== Game 3 ===
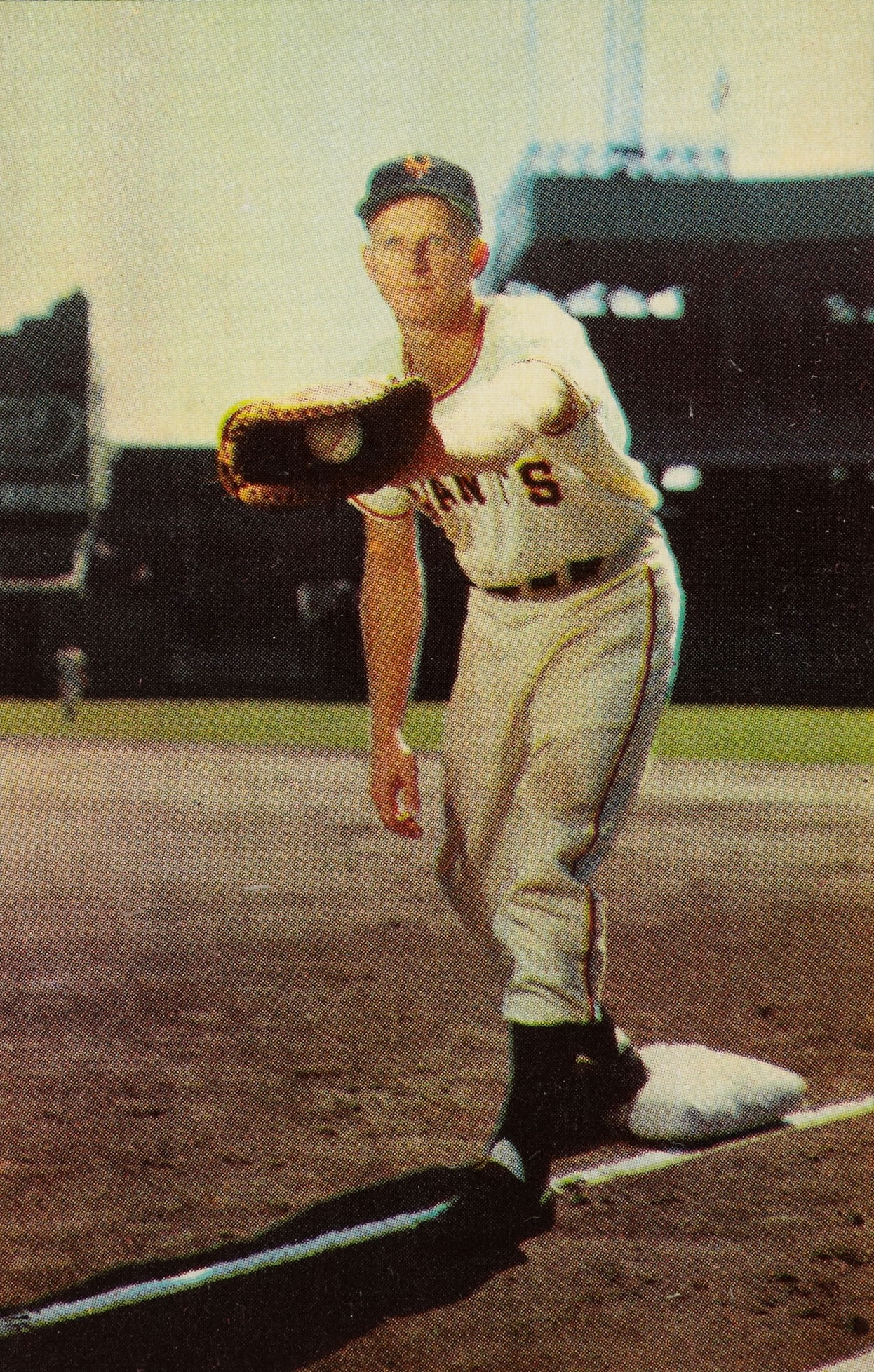
Whitey Lockman

October 6, 1951 1:00 pm (ET) at Polo Grounds in Manhattan, New York
Team	1	2	3	4	5	6	7	8	9	R	H	E
New York (AL)	0	0	0	0	0	0	0	1	1	2	5	2
New York (NL)	0	1	0	0	5	0	0	0	X	6	7	2
WP: Jim Hearn (1–0) LP: Vic Raschi (0–1) Sv: Sheldon Jones (1); Home runs: NYY: Gene Woodling (1); NYG: Whitey Lockman (1)

The Giants struck first in Game 3 when Bobby Thomson hit a leadoff double and scored on Willie Mays' single in the second, then a five-run fifth inning was the undoing of Yankee starter Vic Raschi. Eddie Stanky walked with one out, moved to third on an error, and scored on Al Dark's single. After a Hank Thompson single, another error on Monte Irvin's fielder's choice allowed another run to score and put two on, then a Whitey Lockman three-run home run gave Giants starter Jim Hearn a comfortable 6–0 lead. The Yankees scored a run in the eighth on a bases-loaded walk to Joe Collins, then in the ninth on Gene Woodling's home run off Sheldon Jones, who retired the next two batters to end the game and give the Giants a 2–1 series lead.

=== Game 4 ===
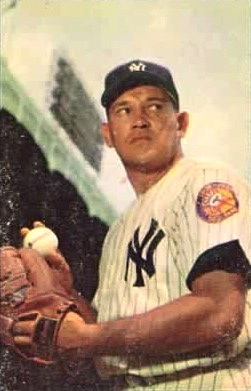
Allie Reynolds

October 8, 1951 1:00 pm (ET) at Polo Grounds in Manhattan, New York
Team	1	2	3	4	5	6	7	8	9	R	H	E
New York (AL)	0	1	0	1	2	0	2	0	0	6	12	0
New York (NL)	1	0	0	0	0	0	0	0	1	2	8	2
WP: Allie Reynolds (1–1) LP: Sal Maglie (0–1); Home runs: NYY: Joe DiMaggio (1); NYG: None

In the rain-delayed Game 4, the Giants again scored first when Al Dark doubled with one out in the opening inning off Allie Reynolds and scored on Monte Irvin's single, but the Yankees tied the game in the second on Joe Collins's RBI single with two on off Sal Maglie. After a single and walk, Reynolds's RBI single in the fourth put the Yankees up 2–1. Joe DiMaggio's first home run of the Series (and the last of his career) following a Yogi Berra single in the fifth extended their lead to 4–1. In the seventh, reliever Sheldon Jones allowed a single and walk, then an error on a pickoff attempt allowed one run to score before Gil McDougald's RBI single made it 6–1 Yankees. Reynolds allowed a one-out RBI single to Bobby Thomson in the ninth before getting Willie Mays to hit into the game-ending double play as the Yankees tied the series with a 6–2 win.

=== Game 5 ===
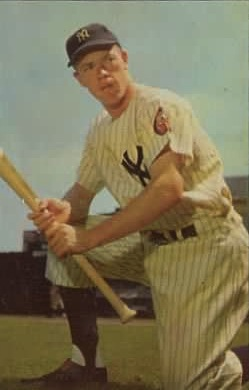
Gil McDougald

October 9, 1951 1:00 pm (ET) at Polo Grounds in Manhattan, New York
Team	1	2	3	4	5	6	7	8	9	R	H	E
New York (AL)	0	0	5	2	0	2	4	0	0	13	12	1
New York (NL)	1	0	0	0	0	0	0	0	0	1	5	3
WP: Eddie Lopat (2–0) LP: Larry Jansen (0–2); Home runs: NYY: Gil McDougald (1), Phil Rizzuto (1); NYG: None

For the third game in a row, the Giants scored first when Al Dark singled with one out in the first and scored on Monte Irvin's single aided by left fielder Gene Woodling's error, but starter Eddie Lopat kept them scoreless for the rest of Game 5 while the Yankees hammered Larry Jansen, Monty Kennedy, and George Spencer. After two one-out walks in the third, Joe DiMaggio's RBI single tied the game, then after an intentional walk loaded the bases, Gil McDougald's grand slam off Jansen put the Yankees up 5–1. Next inning, Phil Rizzuto's home run off Kennedy after a walk extended their lead to 7–1. In the sixth, Rizzuto singled off Spencer before Yogi Berra's single and Johnny Mize's double scored a run each, making it 9–1 Yankees. In the seventh, a bases-loaded walk to Rizzuto forced in a run, then Al Corwin threw a wild pitch that let another run score before DiMaggio's two-run double capped the game's scoring at 13–1 Yankees, who were a win away from the World Series championship as the series returned to Yankee Stadium.

=== Game 6 ===
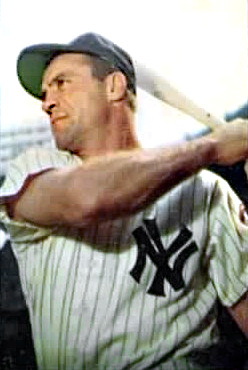
Hank Bauer

October 10, 1951 1:00 pm (ET) at Yankee Stadium in Bronx, New York
Team	1	2	3	4	5	6	7	8	9	R	H	E
New York (NL)	0	0	0	0	1	0	0	0	2	3	11	1
New York (AL)	1	0	0	0	0	3	0	0	X	4	7	0
WP: Vic Raschi (1–1) LP: Dave Koslo (1–1) Sv: Bob Kuzava (1)

The Yankees struck first in Game 6 on Gil McDougald's bases-loaded sacrifice fly in the first off Dave Koslo. The Giants tied the game in the fifth off Vic Raschi when Willie Mays hit a leadoff single, moved two bases on a wild pitch and sacrifice fly, and scored on Eddie Stanky's sacrifice fly. Playing right field in place of Mickey Mantle, Hank Bauer benefited from a tricky Yankee Stadium wind—as well as the umpire's generous call of a ball on Dave Koslo's two-strike pitch—to belt a bases-loaded triple in the sixth inning that would be the difference. Bauer also ensured that the lead held up. Trailing 4–1 in the ninth, the Giants loaded the bases with no outs on three singles off Johnny Sain. Enter reliever Bob Kuzava, acquired in June from the Washington Senators. After two sacrifice flies and the score now 4–3, pinch hitter Sal Yvars hit a sinking liner to right. The stadium crowd gasped as Bauer momentarily lost the ball in the crowd's white shirts and the shadows. But he located it again and charged forward. Bauer, who played in nine World Series and always came through when it mattered most, slid on his knees to catch the ball inches off the ground to end the game and the 1951 World Series. Game 6 was the last baseball game ever played by Joe DiMaggio.

== Composite line score ==
1951 World Series (4–2): New York Yankees (A.L.) over New York Giants (N.L.)

Team	1	2	3	4	5	6	7	8	9	R	H	E
New York Yankees	2	3	5	3	2	5	6	2	1	29	49	4
New York Giants	4	1	0	0	6	3	1	0	3	18	46	10
Total attendance: 341,977 Average attendance: 56,996; Winning player's share: $6,446 Losing player's share: $4,951

== See also ==
- 1951 Japan Series
- Subway Series / Giants–Yankees rivalry
