= Dave Koslo =

American baseball player (1920–1975)

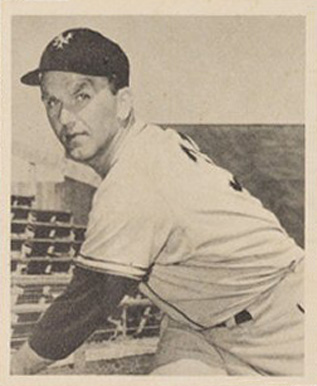
- Pitcher
- Born: March 31, 1920; Menasha, Wisconsin, U.S.
- Died: December 1, 1975 (aged 55); Menasha, Wisconsin, U.S.
- Batted: Left Threw: Left

MLB debut
- September 12, 1941, for the New York Giants

Last MLB appearance
- April 14, 1955, for the Milwaukee Braves

MLB statistics
- Win–loss record: 92–107
- Earned run average: 3.68
- Strikeouts: 606
- Stats at Baseball Reference

Teams
- New York Giants (1941–1942, 1946–1953); Baltimore Orioles (1954); Milwaukee Braves (1954–1955)

Career highlights and awards
- NL ERA leader (1949)

George Bernard "Dave" Koslo (né Koslowski, March 31, 1920 – December 1, 1975) was an American professional baseball left-handed pitcher over parts of twelve seasons (1941–1942, 1946–1955) with the New York Giants, Baltimore Orioles and Milwaukee Braves.

== Professional career ==
On April 18, 1947, Koslo gave up Jackie Robinson's first major league home run, hit in the third inning.

Koslo was the National League ERA champion in 1949 with New York. For his career, he compiled a 92–107 record in 348 appearances, with a 3.68 ERA and 606 strikeouts.

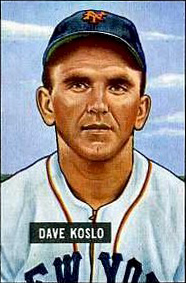
Koslo's 1951 Bowman baseball card

Koslo was the winning pitcher in the opening game of the 1951 World Series and the losing pitcher of its final game.

== Personal life ==
Koslo served in World War II as a member of the 13th Airborne Division of the United States Army from 1943 to 1945.

In 1952, Koslo's wife gave birth to a son. It was his second child after a daughter.

After recovering from a stroke in 1957, he worked in sales. He was born in Menasha, Wisconsin, and later died there at the age of 55.

== See also ==
- List of Major League Baseball annual ERA leaders
