= Max Lanier =

American baseball player (1915–2007)

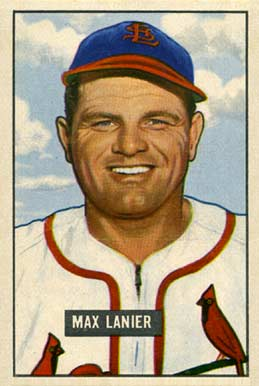
- Lanier on a 1951 Bowman Gum card
- Pitcher
- Born: August 18, 1915; Denton, North Carolina, U.S.
- Died: January 30, 2007 (aged 91); Lecanto, Florida, U.S.
- Batted: Right Threw: Left

MLB debut
- April 20, 1938, for the St. Louis Cardinals

Last MLB appearance
- July 4, 1953, for the St. Louis Browns

MLB statistics
- Win–loss record: 108–82
- Earned run average: 3.01
- Strikeouts: 821
- Stats at Baseball Reference

Teams
- St. Louis Cardinals (1938–1946, 1949–1951); New York Giants (1952–1953); St. Louis Browns (1953)

Career highlights and awards
- 2× All-Star (1943, 1944); 2× World Series champion (1942, 1944); NL ERA leader (1943); St. Louis Cardinals Hall of Fame

Hubert Max Lanier (August 18, 1915 – January 30, 2007) was an American professional baseball pitcher. He played 14 seasons in Major League Baseball (MLB) for the St. Louis Cardinals, New York Giants, and St. Louis Browns. He led the National League in earned run average in 1943, and was the winning pitcher of the clinching game in the 1944 World Series against the Browns. His son Hal became a major league infielder and manager.

== Career ==
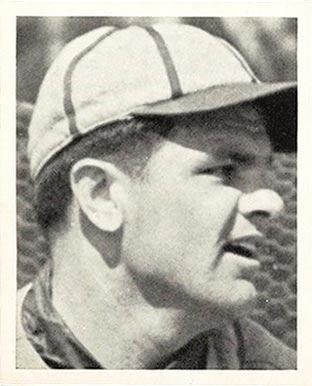
Lanier in 1941

Born in Denton, North Carolina, Lanier was one of a handful of players who remained active during the World War II years. A naturally right-handed player, he had become a left-handed pitcher only because he twice broke his right arm in childhood. After signing with the Cardinals in 1937, he reached the major leagues in 1938. He had arguably his best season in 1943, compiling a 15–7 record with a league-best 1.90 ERA. In 1944 he won a career-high 17 games and was the winner of the final game of the World Series against the crosstown Browns. He was named an NL All-Star in both 1943 and 1944.

Lanier, along with a dozen other major leaguers, defected to the Mexican League in 1946 after being offered a salary nearly double what he was making with the Cardinals. In 18 games with the Azules de Veracruz, he worked to an 8–3 record and a league-leading 1.93 ERA. However, disappointed by poor playing conditions and allegedly broken contract promises, he tried to return to the Cardinals in 1948 but was barred by an order from commissioner Happy Chandler, imposing a five-year suspension on all players who had jumped to the Mexican League. In response, Lanier and teammate Fred Martin, as well as Danny Gardella of the New York Giants, sued Major League Baseball in federal court, challenging baseball's reserve clause as a violation of U.S. antitrust law (preceding the similar suit by Curt Flood some 25 years later). Chandler reinstated Lanier and the other players in June 1949. Lanier immediately held out for more money than he was being paid at the time of his leaving for Mexico, but eventually signed a contract paying him the same amount as in 1946.

Lanier rejoined the Cardinals in 1949. After winning a total of 101 games for the club, he ended his career with the New York Giants (1952–53) and the Browns (1953).

Over fourteen seasons, Lanier posted a 108–82 record with 821 strikeouts and a 3.01 ERA in 1619 1/3 innings pitched, including 21 shutouts and 91 complete games. Lanier's son Hal, would play in professional baseball for ten years.

Lanier died at age 91 in Lecanto, Florida. He was posthumously inducted into the St. Louis Cardinals Hall of Fame on August 20, 2023.

== See also ==
- List of second-generation Major League Baseball players
- List of Major League Baseball annual ERA leaders
