= Sal Yvars =

American baseball player (1924–2008)

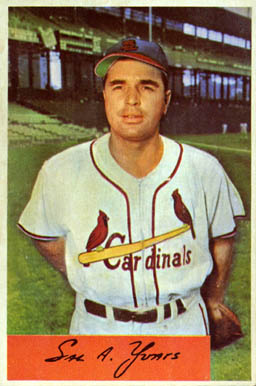
- Catcher
- Born: February 20, 1924; New York City, New York, U.S.
- Died: December 10, 2008 (aged 84); Valhalla, New York, U.S.
- Batted: Right Threw: Right

MLB debut
- September 27, 1947, for the New York Giants

Last MLB appearance
- September 26, 1954, for the St. Louis Cardinals

MLB statistics
- Batting average: .244
- Home runs: 10
- Runs batted in: 42
- Stats at Baseball Reference

Teams
- New York Giants (1947–1953); St. Louis Cardinals (1953–1954)

Salvador Anthony Yvars (February 20, 1924 – December 10, 2008) was an American professional baseball catcher. He played all or part of eight seasons in Major League Baseball, with the New York Giants from 1947 to 1953 and the St. Louis Cardinals from 1953 to 1954. Born in Manhattan's Little Italy to a Valencian gravedigger and a Sicilian laundress, he was a three-sport star at White Plains High School, playing football, basketball, and baseball. He originally signed with the Giants in 1942, and enlisted in the United States Army Air Forces shortly afterward. During his time in the Army, Yvars was effectively a test dummy, with him saying of his ability to handle the tests, "I could take six and a half G's without a pressure helmet."

After World War II, Yvars again played for the Giants' farm system. He played for Manchester of the New England League during the 1946 season, and the Jersey City Jerseys of the International League during the 1947 season. He made his major league debut on September 27, 1947 in the only game he played that season for the Giants. His lone hit of the season came off of Schoolboy Rowe, a single to left field. In 1948, Yvars played in 15 games and had a batting average of .211. He played three games in 1949 and nine in 1950 for the Giants. During the 1951 New York Giants season, Yvars was the backup catcher behind Wes Westrum, and played in 25 games, hitting .317 during the season. During Game Six of the World Series, he lined out to right field for the final out as the Yankees took the series.

Yvars is best remembered as the player on the New York Giants who relayed stolen signals to his teammates awaiting in the batters box during the 1951 pennant-winning season. In the 1980s, he said he wrote a memoir titled How We Stole the Pennant, but lost his publishing deal, he claimed, when he refused to detail the personal peccadilloes of teammates.

The Giants traded Ivars to St. Louis in 1953. He retired the next year, and worked as an investment advisor for 50 years. He died in Valhalla, New York from amyloidosis at the age of 84, survived by his wife, Antoinette; his son, David; daughters Diane, Donna and Deborah; a brother, Jack; five grandchildren; and three great-grandchildren.

In 210 games over eight seasons, Yvars posted a .244 batting average (102-for-418) with 41 runs, 10 home runs and 42 RBI. Defensively, he recorded a .987 fielding percentage.

Yvars is interred in the Gate of Heaven Cemetery in Hawthorne, New York.
