= Al Corwin =

American baseball player (1926–2003)

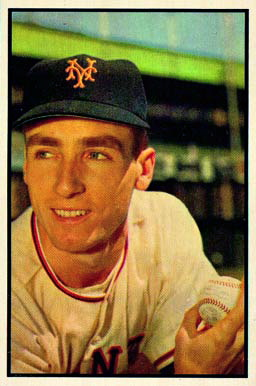
- Pitcher
- Born: December 3, 1926; Newburgh, New York, U.S.
- Died: October 23, 2003 (aged 76); Geneva, Illinois, U.S.
- Batted: Right Threw: Right

MLB debut
- July 25, 1951, for the New York Giants

Last MLB appearance
- May 29, 1955, for the New York Giants

MLB statistics
- Win–loss record: 18–10
- Earned run average: 3.98
- Strikeouts: 142
- Stats at Baseball Reference

Teams
- New York Giants (1951–1955)

Career highlights and awards
- World Series champion (1954)

Elmer Nathan "Al" Corwin (December 3, 1926 – October 23, 2003) was an American professional baseball player, a right-handed pitcher who appeared in Major League Baseball between 1951 and 1955 for the New York Giants. The Newburgh, New York, native stood 6 feet 1 inch (1.85 m) tall and weighed 170 pounds (77 kg). Corwin attended Wallkill Senior High School in Wallkill, Ulster County, New York.

Corwin signed with the Giants in 1948 and 1953 was his only full year in the big leagues. As a Giant, he appeared in 117 games pitched, 22 as a starter. He compiled a won–lost record of 18–10 and an earned run average of 3.98 in 289 1/3 innings pitched, allowing 289 hits and 156 bases on balls, with 142 strikeouts and five saves. Corwin made one appearance in the 1951 World Series. In Game 5, in a mop-up relief role, he hurled 1 2/3 scoreless innings in a 13–1 victory by the eventual champion New York Yankees.

Corwin retired in 1960 after 13 professional seasons.
