= Larry Jansen =

American baseball player (1920–2009)

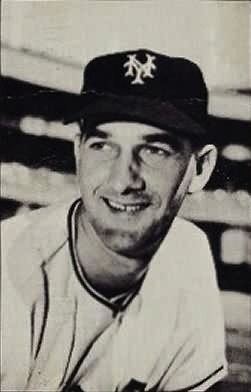
- Jansen in 1953
- Pitcher
- Born: July 16, 1920; Verboort, Oregon, U.S.
- Died: October 10, 2009 (aged 89); Verboort, Oregon, U.S.
- Batted: Right Threw: Right

MLB debut
- April 17, 1947, for the New York Giants

Last MLB appearance
- September 25, 1956, for the Cincinnati Redlegs

MLB statistics
- Win–loss record: 122–89
- Earned run average: 3.58
- Strikeouts: 842
- Stats at Baseball Reference

Teams
- New York Giants (1947–1954); Cincinnati Redlegs (1956)

Career highlights and awards
- 2× All-Star (1950, 1951); World Series champion (1954); NL wins leader (1951)

Lawrence Joseph Jansen (July 16, 1920 – October 10, 2009) was an American right-handed pitcher and coach in Major League Baseball. A native of Oregon, he played minor league baseball in the early 1940s before starting his Major League career in 1947 with the New York Giants. Jansen played nine seasons in the big leagues, and was twice an All-Star, winning 122 games in all. He later coached in the Major Leagues and minor leagues. Jansen is a member of the Oregon Sports Hall of Fame and the Pacific Coast League Hall of Fame.

== Early life ==
Lawrence Jansen was born in Verboort, Oregon, on July 16, 1920. He was raised in the same community, located near Forest Grove in Washington County, graduating from Verboort High School in 1938. While still in school Jansen started his baseball career playing semi-pro ball. In 1940 Jansen was discovered by a scout and started playing for the Salt Lake City Bees, a Class C club at that time. Jansen married the former Eileen Vandehey that year, and they had 10 children. In 1941, he started playing for the San Francisco Seals in the Pacific Coast League, but in 1943, given the choice between being drafted to fight in World War II or taking a deferment to work on the family dairy farm back in Oregon, he chose the latter. He played semi-pro ball there part-time and returned to the Seals late in the 1945 season.

== MLB career ==
Breaking in as a 27-year-old rookie, Jansen became a key member of the New York Giants starting rotation from 1947 to 1953, twice winning more than 20 games. He was purchased from the Triple-A Seals after leading the Pacific Coast League in wins (30), earned run average (1.57) and winning percentage (.833) in 1946. In his rookie major league season in 1947, Jansen won 21 of 26 decisions, leading the National League in winning percentage (.808), and finished second in the voting for Rookie of the Year behind the Brooklyn Dodgers' Jackie Robinson.

He pitched five innings of one-hit scoreless baseball in the 1950 All-Star Game, which lasted 14 innings.

In 1951, he paced the NL-champion Giants with 23 victories and helped lead their improbable August and September comeback against the Dodgers. Jansen was the winning pitcher in the famous game on October 3, 1951, featuring the Shot Heard 'Round the World. Jansen, however, lost his only two decisions in the 1951 World Series. Jansen also won 19 games (1950) and 18 games (1948) for the New York club.

As an indication of the low salaries of even accomplished players in the mid-twentieth century, Jansen worked in a hardware store in Forest Grove, Oregon, during the off-seasons of his best years.

Arm miseries kept Jansen from a major role in the Giants' 1954 world championship; he spent part of that season inactive, as a coach. His playing career ended after eight appearances with the 1956 Cincinnati Redlegs. During his nine-year NL career, Jansen won 122 games and lost 89 (.578) with an ERA of 3.58. He had five 15-win seasons and two 20-win seasons.

== Coaching career ==
Jansen returned to the Pacific Coast League as a player-coach with Seattle (1955 and 1957) and Portland (1958–60). After a call from former teammate Alvin Dark, Jansen returned to the Major Leagues as pitching coach for the San Francisco Giants in 1961, with Dark as manager. Jansen remained as pitching coach for eleven seasons, and helped to develop future Hall-of-Famers Juan Marichal and Gaylord Perry. During his tenure, the Giants made appearances in the 1962 World Series and 1971 National League Championship Series. He then moved on to his final MLB coaching job, handling pitchers for the Chicago Cubs in 1972–73, working for his old Giants manager, Leo Durocher, and then former teammate Whitey Lockman.

== Authorship ==
In retirement, Larry Jansen (along with his co-author, George Jansen MD and illustrator Karl van Loo) left behind in book form his accumulated wisdom on every aspect of pitching in professional baseball: The Craft of Pitching (Masters Press, 1977).

Previously, Jansen had contributed a section on pitching in The Sporting News 1951 publication How to Play Baseball. Besides Jansen, the publication had other authors on specific topics: "Catching by Ray Schalk; Batting by Rogers Hornsby; Base Running by Bernie DeViveiros; First Base by George Sisler; Second Base by Rogers Hornsby; Shortstop by Honus Wagner; Third Base by George Kell; Outfield by Joe DiMaggio; and How to Umpire by George Barr."

== Awards and honors ==
Jansen was inducted into the Oregon Sports Hall of Fame in 1980. Sports Illustrated selected Jansen as one of Oregon's Fifty Greatest Athletes in 2004.

In 2010, Jansen was inducted into the Pacific Coast League Hall of Fame.

== Later life and death ==
After retiring from baseball, he returned to his hometown Verboort, Oregon, where he sold real estate and lived the remainder of his life in the house he had built in 1951.

Lawrence Jansen died in his sleep in Verboort at the age of 89 on October 10, 2009. The cause of death was congestive heart failure and pneumonia. Jansen was survived by his wife Eileen, their ten children and their families.

== See also ==
- List of Major League Baseball annual wins leaders

Preceded by Bill Posedel	San Francisco Giants pitching coach 1961–1971	Succeeded by Don McMahon
Preceded by Mel Wright	Chicago Cubs pitching coach 1972–1973	Succeeded by Hank Aguirre
