= Jim Hearn =

American baseball player (1921–1998)

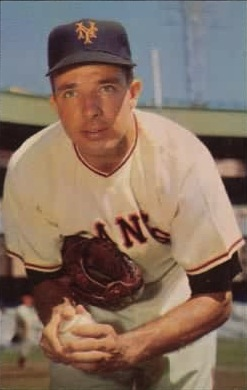
- Hearn in about 1953.
- Pitcher
- Born: April 11, 1921; Atlanta, Georgia, U.S.
- Died: June 10, 1998 (aged 77); Boca Grande, Florida, U.S.
- Batted: Right Threw: Right

MLB debut
- April 17, 1947, for the St. Louis Cardinals

Last MLB appearance
- May 15, 1959, for the Philadelphia Phillies

MLB statistics
- Win–loss record: 109–89
- Earned run average: 3.81
- Strikeouts: 669
- Stats at Baseball Reference

Teams
- St. Louis Cardinals (1947–1950); New York Giants (1950–1956); Philadelphia Phillies (1957–1959)

Career highlights and awards
- All-Star (1952); World Series champion (1954)

James Tolbert Hearn (April 11, 1921 – June 10, 1998) was an American professional baseball player who was a pitcher in Major League Baseball for 13 seasons (1947–1959). The right-hander was listed as 6 feet 3 inches (1.91 m) tall and 205 pounds (93 kg).

== Career ==
Born in Atlanta, Hearn attended Georgia Tech and signed with the St. Louis Cardinals in 1942. He spent two years in the minor leagues and three performing military service in the United States Army during World War II, before being called up in 1947. After compiling a 21–17 record for the Cardinals over all or parts of four seasons, he was placed on waivers and claimed by the New York Giants on July 10, 1950. He then went on to lead the National League in earned run average (2.49) and win 11 of 14 decisions for manager Leo Durocher that season.

Hearn was a member of the 1951 Giants' starting rotation, winning 17 games and helping them overcome a 131/2-game mid-August deficit to the Brooklyn Dodgers to win the NL pennant. He defeated the Dodgers 3–1 in Game 1 of the NL pennant playoff and in the 1951 World Series, defeated the eventual champion New York Yankees 6–2 in his only start, in Game 3 at the Polo Grounds. He gave up only one earned run in the Series, for a Fall Classic ERA of 1.04.

Hearn pitched in New York for five more seasons where he compiled a 50–54 record through 1956. The following season he was traded to the Philadelphia Phillies, where he was used as a relief pitcher. On May 10 1959, he pitched 11/3 innings against the Pittsburgh Pirates and gave up two runs before the game was suspended. He was given his unconditional release 12 days later. The suspended game was resumed in July, and Pittsburgh held on to win. Thus Hearn was charged with a loss, weeks after his career had ended.

== Statistics ==
Overall, Hearn appeared in 396 games, winning 109, losing 89, with an ERA of 3.81, 63 complete games, ten shutouts and eight saves. In 1,7032/3 innings pitched, he allowed 1,661 hits and 655 bases on balls, with 669 strikeouts.

== Post-playing career ==
Hearn was a color commentator for CBC Television's Game of the Week in 1966. In 1969, he was television commentator announcer for the expansion Montreal Expos. An excellent golfer, he opened a golf school after his baseball career ended. He died at age 77 in Boca Grande, Florida.
