= George Spencer (baseball) =

American baseball player (1926–2014)

- Pitcher
- Born: July 7, 1926; Bexley, Ohio, U.S.
- Died: September 10, 2014 (aged 88); Galena, Ohio, U.S.
- Batted: Right Threw: Right

MLB debut
- August 17, 1950, for the New York Giants

Last MLB appearance
- September 26, 1960, for the Detroit Tigers

MLB statistics
- Win–loss record: 16–10
- Earned run average: 4.05
- Strikeouts: 82
- Stats at Baseball Reference

Teams
- New York Giants (1950–1955); Detroit Tigers (1958, 1960)

George Elwell Spencer (July 7, 1926 – September 10, 2014) was an American pitcher in Major League Baseball. A right-hander, he was primarily a relief pitcher for the New York Giants and the Detroit Tigers. Spencer stood 6 feet 0 inches (1.83 m) tall and weighed 200 pounds (91 kg).

A graduate of Bexley High School and Ohio State University, where he played quarterback on the OSU varsity football team, Spencer was a key member of the 1951 Giants' pitching staff, leading the club in saves and winning ten of 14 decisions, including a key August start over the front-running Brooklyn Dodgers. The Giants would famously overcome a 13 1/2-game, mid-August deficit to tie Brooklyn on the season's final day, then defeated the Dodgers for the National League pennant on Bobby Thomson's historic Game 3 home run.
