= Whitey Lockman =

American baseball player and manager (1926–2009)

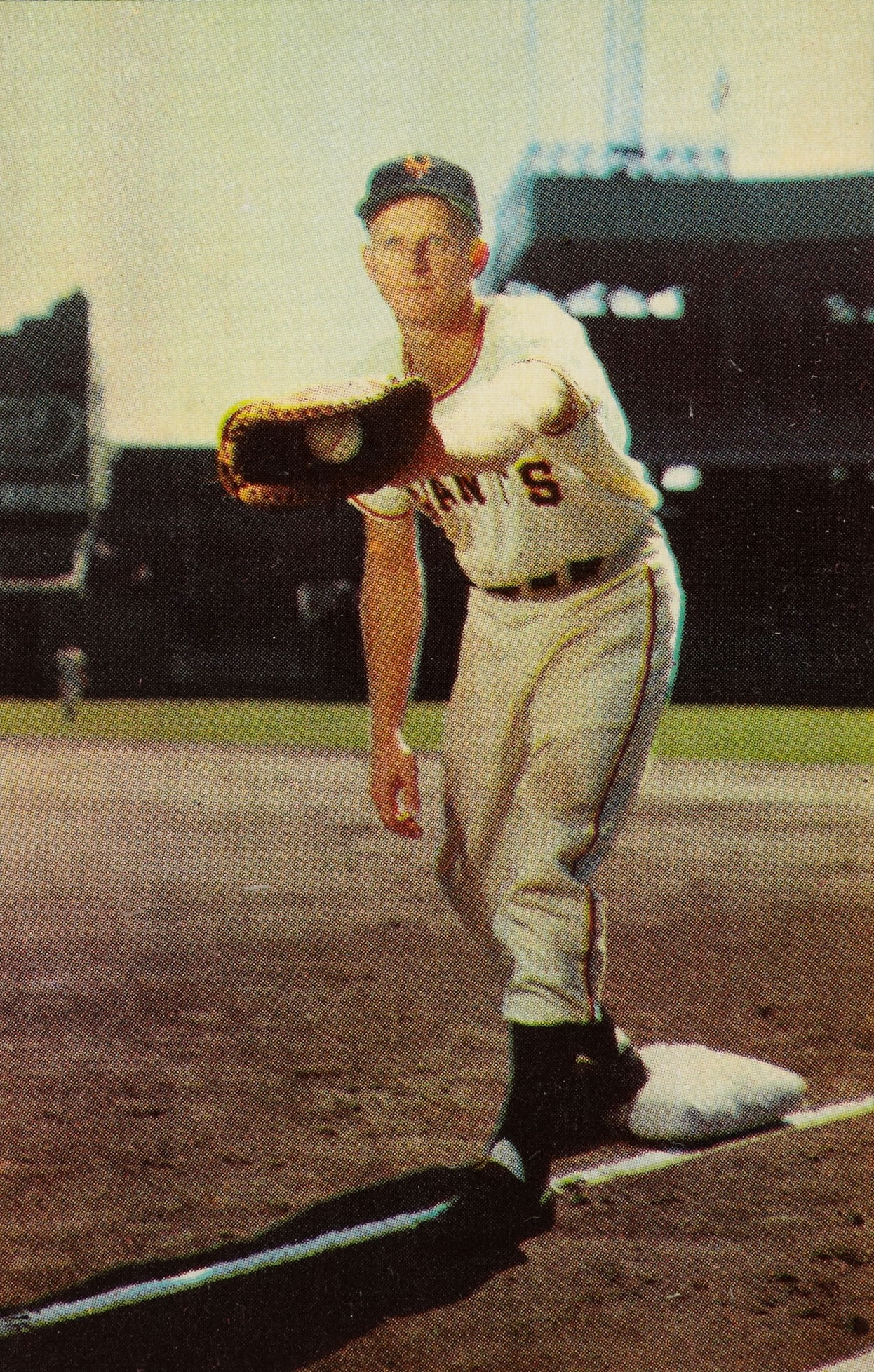
- Lockman at the Polo Grounds in 1953
- Outfielder / First baseman / Manager
- Born: July 25, 1926; Lowell, North Carolina, U.S.
- Died: March 17, 2009 (aged 82); Scottsdale, Arizona, U.S.
- Batted: Left Threw: Right

MLB debut
- July 5, 1945, for the New York Giants

Last MLB appearance
- June 24, 1960, for the Cincinnati Reds

MLB statistics
- Batting average: .279
- Home runs: 114
- Runs batted in: 563
- Managerial record: 157–162
- Winning %: .492
- Stats at Baseball Reference
- Managerial record at Baseball Reference

Teams
- As player: New York Giants (1945, 1947–1956); St. Louis Cardinals (1956); New York / San Francisco Giants (1957–1958); Baltimore Orioles (1959); Cincinnati Reds (1959–1960); As manager: Chicago Cubs (1972–1974)

Career highlights and awards
- All-Star (1952); World Series champion (1954)

Carroll Walter "Whitey" Lockman (July 25, 1926 – March 17, 2009) was an American left-handed hitting first baseman and outfielder, coach, manager and front office executive in Major League Baseball.

== Playing career ==
Born in Lowell, North Carolina, Lockman signed with the Giants as a 17-year-old during World War II and came to New York from the minor leagues in the middle of the 1945 season, just prior to his 19th birthday. Lockman hit a home run in his first at-bat becoming the youngest to do so in MLB history; his record still stands, as of 2025, with the most recent player to come close being 20-year-old Jasson Domínguez in 2023. He batted .341 in limited duty that season.

On October 3, 1951, Lockman scored the tying run, just ahead of Bobby Thomson, on Thomson's home run that gave the New York Giants the National League championship—baseball's "Shot Heard 'Round the World." Lockman's one-out double against the Brooklyn Dodgers had scored Alvin Dark with the Giants' first run of the inning, and made the score 4–2, Brooklyn. His hit knocked Dodger pitcher Don Newcombe out of the game, and, on the play, Giant baserunner Don Mueller broke his ankle sliding into third base. While Mueller was being carried off the field to be replaced by pinch runner Clint Hartung, Dodger manager Chuck Dressen, acting on the instructions of Dodger bullpen coach Clyde Sukeforth, called on relief pitcher Ralph Branca, whose second pitch was hit by Thomson over the head of Andy Pafko into the Polo Grounds' lower left field stands for a game-winning, three-run homer. However in the 1951 World Series, won in six games by the New York Yankees, Lockman hit .240 with a home run. Three years later, he batted only .111 in the 1954 Fall Classic, but the Giants swept the Cleveland Indians to win the world championship.

In his only All-Star appearance, Lockman was the National League's starting first baseman in the 1952 All-Star Game at Shibe Park in Philadelphia. The game was called off after five innings due to rain.

In 1956, Lockman was traded to the St. Louis Cardinals. His time in St. Louis was brief, however, as the Cardinals sent him back to the Giants after the end of the 1956 season. He was a member of the Giants' last New York team, and their first San Francisco outfit, when the club moved West in 1958. He finished his playing career in 1959–60 with the Baltimore Orioles and Cincinnati Reds.

Appearing in 1,666 games, Lockman had a .279 career batting average with 114 home runs and 563 RBI.

== Coach, manager, player development director ==
Lockman's coaching career began immediately after his playing days ended, as he joined the Reds' staff in 1960 under skipper Fred Hutchinson. In 1961, when his old teammate Dark became manager of the Giants, Lockman became his third base coach, serving through 1964. Lockman then joined the Chicago Cubs as a minor league manager (1965; 1967–70), MLB coach (1966), and, then, supervisor of player development.

In July 1972, he succeeded his old mentor, Leo Durocher, as the team's manager, and the revitalized Cubs won 39 of 65 games to improve two places in the standings. But losing marks in 1973 and into 1974 cost Lockman his job; he was relieved of his duties July 24, 1974 and moved back into the Chicago front office, serving as vice president, player development, to 1976. Lockman later was a player development official and special assignment scout for the Montreal Expos and Florida Marlins.

He finished with a career major league managing record of 157–162 (.492). he died in 2009

== See also ==
- Home run in first Major League at-bat
