= Shot Heard 'Round the World (baseball) =

Baseball home run

The Shot Heard 'Round the World: Dotted line represents the approximate track of Thomson's game-winning line drive home run

In baseball, the "Shot Heard 'Round the World" was a walk-off home run hit by New York Giants outfielder and third baseman Bobby Thomson off Brooklyn Dodgers pitcher Ralph Branca at the Polo Grounds in New York City on October 3, 1951, to win the National League (NL) pennant. Thomson's dramatic three-run homer came in the ninth inning of the decisive third game of a three-game playoff for the pennant in which the Giants trailed 4–1 entering the ninth and 4–2 with two runners on base at the time of Thomson's at-bat.

The game was seen by millions of viewers across America and heard on radio by millions more, including thousands of American servicemen stationed in Korea listening on Armed Forces Radio. The dramatic victory to secure a pennant was intensified by the cross-town rivalry between the Giants and Dodgers and by a remarkable string of victories in the last weeks of the regular season by the Giants, who won 37 of their last 44 games to catch the first-place Dodgers and force a playoff series to decide the NL champion. The Giants' late-season rally and 2-to-1-game playoff victory, capped by Thomson's moment of triumph, are collectively known in baseball lore as "The Miracle of Coogan's Bluff", a descriptor coined by the legendary sports columnist Red Smith.

The phrase "shot heard round the world" is from the 1837 poem "Concord Hymn" by Ralph Waldo Emerson, about the first clash of the American Revolutionary War, and has been popularly applied to several dramatic historical moments.

== Background ==
The principal National League (NL) contenders in 1951 were the New York Giants, Brooklyn Dodgers, and Philadelphia Phillies. The Dodgers quickly pulled into first place and widened their lead as the season progressed. On August 11, with a 13 1/2-game lead over the second-place Giants, they appeared certain to face the New York Yankees in the World Series. "Unless [the Dodgers] completely fold in their last 50 games," wrote an Associated Press writer, "they're in." The Phillies, 14 1/2 games back, faded from contention, but the Giants won 16 straight games from August 12 to August 27, cutting the Dodgers' lead to six games. By September 20, they had pulled to within 4 1/2 games, still a prohibitive margin with only ten days remaining in the season, but the Giants won all of their final seven games while the Dodgers lost six of their last ten. The two teams concluded the regular season deadlocked with 96–58 records.

The NL used a three-game playoff at that time to break ties for the pennant. The Dodgers won the coin toss to determine the playoff schedule; they elected to play the first game at home and the second (and third if needed) at the Polo Grounds, reasoning that after a likely win in Brooklyn, they would need to win only one of two at the Giants' park. Nevertheless, in Game One at Ebbets Field, the Giants, with Jim Hearn on the mound, defeated the Dodgers' Ralph Branca 3–1 thanks to home runs by Bobby Thomson and Monte Irvin. In Game Two at the Polo Grounds, with the Yankees team in attendance as spectators (another version has the Yankees at Game Three but leaving before the fateful home run to beat the traffic), the Dodgers tied the series, winning 10–0 on home runs by Jackie Robinson, Gil Hodges, Andy Pafko, and Rube Walker, who was catching in place of an injured Roy Campanella. Clem Labine pitched a six-hit shutout against Sheldon Jones. The 1–1 deadlock set up the deciding third game at the Polo Grounds on October 3.

== The game ==
Wednesday, October 3, 1951 1:30 pm (ET) at Polo Grounds in Manhattan, New York
Team	1	2	3	4	5	6	7	8	9	R	H	E
Brooklyn	1	0	0	0	0	0	0	3	0	4	8	0
New York	0	0	0	0	0	0	1	0	4	5	8	0
WP: Larry Jansen (23–11) LP: Ralph Branca (13–12); Home runs: BKN: None; NYG: Bobby Thomson (32); Attendance: 34,320

For Game Three, Sal Maglie was on the mound for New York while Brooklyn called on Don Newcombe. In the first inning, Robinson singled in Pee Wee Reese for the game's first run. A Giants rally in the second inning, initiated by Whitey Lockman's single, fizzled when Thomson, trying to stretch a single into a double, failed to notice that Lockman had not advanced to third base and was tagged out by Robinson. The score remained 1–0 through the sixth inning. In the seventh inning, Irvin led off with a double for the Giants. He was bunted over to third and scored on a sacrifice fly by Thomson, tying the score at one run each.

In the top of the eighth, the Dodgers came back with three runs. With Reese and Duke Snider on third and first after back-to-back singles, a Maglie wild pitch allowed Reese to score and Snider to advance to second. Robinson was walked intentionally to set up a double play, but Pafko's ground ball to third bounced off the heel of Thomson's glove; Snider scored and Robinson took third. Billy Cox added another single to score Robinson, making the score 4–1 in favor of the Dodgers. Newcombe set down the Giants in order in the bottom of the eighth while Larry Jansen did the same in relief of Maglie in the top of the ninth.

Newcombe had pitched a complete game on September 29, four days earlier, in Philadelphia, followed by 5 2/3 innings in relief the following day during the last game of the regular season. According to some accounts, after eight innings on only two days' rest, he attempted to take himself out of the game, but Robinson demanded that he continue: "You go out there and pitch until your arm falls off!" Newcombe himself insisted that he never asked to be relieved, a version corroborated by Snider and Pafko.

Giants shortstop Alvin Dark singled off Newcombe to start the bottom-of-the-ninth rally. At that point, the Dodgers made a crucial defensive mistake: with no outs, a runner on first, and a three-run lead, the normal strategy would be to position the infield for a possible double play, but first baseman Gil Hodges played behind Dark — apparently guarding against a highly unlikely steal attempt — leaving a large gap on the right side of the infield. Don Mueller, batting left-handed, hit a single through that gap, advancing Dark from first to third. Instead of a rally-killing double play, the Dodgers found themselves facing the potential tying run at the plate with two runners on base, nobody out, and Irvin, with 121 regular-season RBIs, at bat; however, Newcombe got Irvin to chase an outside pitch and foul out to Hodges. (Sportswriter Bud Greenspan and others have argued that, had the Dodgers' infield played Mueller at double-play depth, Irvin's pop-up would in all likelihood have been the season-ending third out.)

Lockman followed with a double down the left field line, driving in Dark and advancing Mueller to third. Mueller slid awkwardly into the base, injuring his ankle, and was replaced by pinch runner Clint Hartung. With Thomson coming up, Dodgers manager Chuck Dressen finally pulled the exhausted Newcombe. In the bullpen, where Branca and Carl Erskine were warming up, coach Clyde Sukeforth noticed that Erskine, who had been troubled by arm problems all season, was bouncing his curve balls short of the plate (it also didn't help matters that Rube Walker was starting as catcher for this game after Roy Campanella was injured, and Walker was not a particularly fast runner), and Sukeforth advised Dressen to go with Branca. That decision has been continually second-guessed by fans, sportswriters, and baseball historians: Branca had lost six of his last seven decisions and given up a game-winning home run to Thomson in the first playoff game. Dressen's options, however, were severely limited: the only other available pitchers with crucial-situation experience were right-hander Clyde King, who was sidelined with biceps tendonitis; left-hander Preacher Roe, who was not a strategic option to pitch to the right-handed Thomson; and right-hander Labine, who had pitched a complete game the day before. Nevertheless, it was the second questionable decision by Dressen that inning.

Thomson was now at bat with first base open and Willie Mays (soon to be named the NL Rookie of the Year) on deck. Mays had gone 0-for-3 with two strikeouts against Branca in the first playoff game, but Dressen was unwilling to put the winning run on base and worried that a veteran pinch hitter might be brought in to bat for Mays if he did so. In a third controversial decision, Dressen elected to pitch to Thomson rather than walk him intentionally. Thomson later recalled that as he left the on-deck circle, Giants manager Leo Durocher turned to him and said, "If you ever hit one, hit it now."

Branca's first pitch was a called strike on the inside corner. His second was a fastball high and inside, intended as a setup for his next, a breaking ball down and away, but Thomson connected strongly, driving the ball down the left field line. The ball landed in the lower-deck stands near the left field foul line for a game-ending, three-run home run. Thomson ran the bases then disappeared into a mob of jubilant teammates gathered at home plate. The stunned Dodgers players began the long walk toward the visitors' clubhouse under the center field bleachers; Robinson turned to watch Thomson, making certain that he touched every base, before following his teammates off the field.

Later, after the celebrations had calmed down, a delegation of Dodgers—Reese, Snider, Roe, and Robinson—visited the Giants' locker room to offer their congratulations. "I just want you to know that we didn't lose the pennant," Robinson told them. "You guys won it."

== Thomson's role in the game ==
Before hitting the game-winning home run, Thomson was involved in several crucial plays throughout the game in all three facets: hitting, fielding, and base running.

At the plate, he went 3-for-3 and batted in four of the Giants' five runs. He erased both Dodgers' leads in the game, tying it at 1–1 with a sacrifice fly in the seventh and, of course, winning it with his home run in the ninth.

Thomson was also involved in several plays that hurt the Giants. His base running error in the second inning ended a potential rally for the Giants, who were trailing 1–0 at the time. Gordon McLendon, who was broadcasting the game on the Liberty radio network, drew comparisons between Thomson's mistake and Merkle's Boner, which cost the Giants the pennant in 1908, and Red Smith structured his game report around that play.

After Thomson tied the game with a sacrifice fly in the bottom of the seventh inning, the Dodgers scored three runs in the top of the eighth to go ahead 4–1. Two of the Dodgers' runs scored on balls hit towards Thomson, one deflecting off his glove into foul territory, and the other passing him into left field. Red Smith commented on the latter hit by asking—and answering—the rhetorical question, "Where does [Billy Cox's] hit go? Where else? Through Thomson at third."

After both teams went down in order in the next inning, it was under these circumstances that Thomson stepped to the plate in the ninth inning with one out, two runners on, and the Giants trailing by two runs.

== The broadcasts ==
Several television and radio broadcasters captured the moment for baseball fans in the New York City area and nationwide.

=== Russ Hodges ===
The best known live description—"arguably the most famous call in sports"—was delivered by Russ Hodges, who was broadcasting the game on WMCA-AM radio for Giants fans. His call captured the suddenness and exultation of the home run:

Branca throws... There's a long fly... it's gonna be... I believe... The Giants win the pennant! The Giants win the pennant! The Giants win the pennant! The Giants win the pennant! Bobby hit it into the lower deck of the left-field stands... The Giants win the pennant and they're going crazy... I don't believe it! I don't believe it! I will not believe it! Bobby Thomson hit a line drive into the lower deck of the left-field stands and the place is going crazy! The Giants—Horace Stoneham has got a winner! The Giants win it by a score of 5–4—and they're picking Bobby Thomson up and carrying him off the field!

Broadcasts were not routinely taped in 1951, and no one at any of the local radio or television stations was recording the game. The WMCA call survives only because a Brooklyn-based fan named Lawrence Goldberg asked his mother to tape-record the last half-inning of the radio broadcast while he was at work. In later years, Hodges told interviewers that Goldberg was a Dodgers fan who made the tape "so he could hear the voice of the Giants weep when Brooklyn won." In fact, Goldberg had been a Giants fan since childhood.

In 2020, the Library of Congress inducted Hodges' broadcast into the National Recording Registry for "cultural, historical and aesthetic importance to the nation’s recorded sound heritage."

=== Ernie Harwell ===
Hodges' broadcasting partner, Ernie Harwell, called the game for the team's television flagship WPIX; the independent station's broadcast was also carried nationally on the NBC network, the first coast-to-coast live telecast of a Major League Baseball game. Harwell's description was not recorded; he later recalled saying simply, "It's gone!" almost at the moment Thomson's bat struck the ball—and then watching in dismay as the ball began to sink. "I said to myself, 'If that ball drops into Pafko's glove, I'm in deep trouble.'" As the ball disappeared into the lower deck, he recalled, no further commentary was necessary. "The pictures took over."

=== Red Barber ===
Dodgers announcer Red Barber, calling the game for WMGM-AM radio, straightforwardly said, "Branca pumps, delivers – a curve, swung on and belted, deep shot to left field—it is—a home run! And the New York Giants win the National League pennant and the Polo Grounds goes wild!" Barber was openly critical of Hodges' call, labeling it "unprofessional."

=== Gordon McLendon ===
Only local Giants fans heard the famous Hodges call live. Most listeners heard McLendon's call on the Liberty Broadcasting System, which carried the game nationally. McLendon's account, complete with a similarly enthusiastic yell of "The Giants win the pennant!" and preserved on Harwell's "Audio Scrapbook," remains the only professionally recorded broadcast account of the entire third game.

=== Other ===
The game was also broadcast on radio by Al Helfer for the Mutual Broadcasting System, Buck Canel and Felo Ramírez for a Spanish language network, and Nat Allbright in a studio re-creation for the Dodgers' secondary network in the South. Harry Caray, then an announcer with the St. Louis Cardinals, called the game for a St. Louis radio station. Pittsburgh Pirates announcer Bob Prince was in the WMCA booth with Hodges and may have also participated in broadcasting the game.

== Aftermath ==
New York Herald Tribune sportswriter Red Smith titled his October 4 column "The Miracle of Coogan's Bluff" and began it with what has been called "the greatest lede ever written":

Now it is done. Now the story ends. And there is no way to tell it. The art of fiction is dead. Reality has strangled invention. Only the utterly impossible, the inexpressibly fantastic, can ever be plausible again.

Another sportswriter, The Washington Post's Shirley Povich, wrote that "Hollywood's most imaginative screenwriters on an opium jag could not have imagined a more improbable windup of the season that had started in April and had its finish today in the triumph of Bobby Thomson and the Giants."

The Giants lost the ensuing World Series to the Yankees in six games. The Dodgers' plan of having red uniform numbers on the lower left front of their white home jerseys had they qualified for that Fall Classic was postponed until the start of the following season.

Sukeforth resigned his position as bullpen coach in January 1952 after 19 years with the Dodgers. He denied that his role in the final inning of the Shot game had any bearing on his decision to leave. Some historians have since speculated otherwise, based on Dressen's post-game reply to why he brought in Branca: "Sukeforth said he was ready." Sukeforth told a journalist in 2000, the last year of his life, that "everybody knows the manager is responsible for decisions." He added, "It didn't matter what anybody said ... Branca was the only one who could come in when that big guy [Newcombe] couldn't go any further."

Individual recollections of Thomson's home run continued to emerge decades after the event. In the 1990s, Thomson received a letter from a Marine who had been stationed in Korea in 1951:

"I was in a bunker in the front line with my buddy listening to the radio. It was contrary to orders, but he was a Giants fanatic. He never made it home and I promised him if I ever got back I'd write and tell you about the happiest moment of his life. It's taken me this long to put my feelings into words. On behalf of my buddy, thanks, Bobby."

In the fall of 2001, surviving members of the 1951 Giants and Dodgers, including Thomson and Branca, met at Coogan's Bluff, overlooking the site of the long-since-demolished ballpark, to celebrate the 50th anniversary of the game.

Thomson's baseball legacy rests almost completely on the Shot despite his other notable accomplishments, such as eight 20-home run seasons and three All Star selections. "It was the best thing that ever happened to me", he told a reporter toward the end of his life. "It may have been the best thing that ever happened to anybody."

== Origin of the phrase ==
According to baseball historian Jules Tygiel, "[t]he phrase ['shot heard 'round the world'] was in the air," having been used literally or in a slightly deviated form in connection with the 1935 Masters and a Jackie Robinson home run, hit just three days prior to Thomson's, to force the playoff series. The day after the game, October 4, 1951, the New York Daily News ran a front-page game recap under the headline, "The Shot Heard 'Round the Baseball World". and a New York Times editorial that same day called Thomson's homer "the home run heard round the world." According to Tygiel, the "two phrases merged in the popular memory" and quickly spread to other media, and "Shot Heard 'Round the World" soon became the most popular epithet for Thomson's homer. It is a direct reference to a line in Ralph Waldo Emerson's poem "Concord Hymn" to describe the opening shot of the Battle of Concord.

In addition to a historical and literary reference, the phrase can also be seen as a sign of the times. Tygiel reads it as a reflection of "American postwar arrogance", and sportswriter Eric Neel considers it as an example of many sportswriters of the time displaying a "Cold War feel for the apocalyptic" in their writing—dramatizing sports through war and battle metaphors. As a matter of fact, the very same day that Thomson hit his home run, the Soviet Union set off an atomic bomb test, which created the juxtaposition of the "'unrepeatable, communal joy' of […] Thomson's gallop around the bases and the collective fear inspired by an escalating atomic race" in the next day's newspapers.

That being said, the nickname may have simply emerged and stuck as a result of extended media coverage. This three-game series was "the first baseball ever televised on a truly national basis" as coast-to-coast cable had just been installed. Moreover, the game was broadcast nationally on the radio and to "hundreds of thousands of American military personnel stationed 'round the world' who heard 'the shot' on Armed Forces Radio."

The circumstances of the Giants winning the 1951 N.L. pennant, overcoming a seemingly insurmountable 13-game deficit on August 11 to force the three-game playoff series with the Dodgers, are also referred to as the "Miracle of Coogan’s Bluff," the term used as the headline in the Herald Tribune the day after the game. However, "Shot Heard ‘Round the World" stuck as the primary name for Thomson's home run.

== Sign stealing by the Giants ==
In ensuing years, rumors began to circulate that during the second half of the 1951 season, the Giants engaged in systematic sign stealing—stealing the finger signals transmitted from catcher to pitcher that determine the pitch to be thrown. The Associated Press reported the rumor in 1962, but the story gave no specifics and was based on an anonymous source. In 2001, many of the 21 Giants players still alive at the time, as well as one surviving coach, told the Wall Street Journal that beginning on July 20, the team used a telescope in the Giants clubhouse behind center field, manned by infielder Hank Schenz and later by coach Herman Franks, to steal the finger signals of opposing catchers. Stolen signs were relayed via a buzzer wire connected from the clubhouse to telephones in the Giants' dugout and bullpen—one buzz for a fastball, two for an off-speed pitch. "Every hitter knew what was coming," said pitcher Al Gettel. "Made a big difference." Joshua Prager, the author of the Journal article, outlined the evidence in greater detail in a 2006 book.

Although backup catcher Sal Yvars told Prager that he relayed Rube Walker's fastball sign to Thomson from the bullpen, Thomson repeatedly insisted that he was concentrating on the situation and did not take the sign. Branca made no public comment at the time. "I made a decision not to speak about it," he said. "I didn't want to look like I was crying over spilled milk." Later he told The New York Times, "I didn't want to diminish a legendary moment in baseball. And even if Bobby knew what was coming, he had to hit it ... Knowing the pitch doesn't always help." In another interview, Branca pointed out that luck and circumstance were involved as well; had the coin toss gone the other way, Thomson's Shot would not have been a home run at Ebbets Field, nor would the game-winner he hit in the first playoff game have been a homer at the Polo Grounds.

Whether the telescope-and-buzzer system contributed significantly to the Giants' late-season 37–7 win streak remains a subject of debate. Prager notes in his book that sign stealing was not specifically forbidden by MLB rules at the time and, moral issues aside, "...has been a part of baseball since its inception". Sign stealing using optical or other mechanical aids was outlawed by MLB in 1961.

== Artifacts ==
Some of the artifacts from the historic moment have been preserved. Thomson's game bat and shoes are the centerpieces of an exhibit dedicated to the Shot at the National Baseball Hall of Fame and Museum. The exhibit is one of the Hall's most popular attractions, according to curators.

Thomson's game jersey is most likely in the collection of Dan Scheinman, a collector who owns a small minority stake in the Giants. In 2005, he bought two 1951 jerseys—one home and one road—from Thomson, who told him that he had worn them in the World Series, but could not remember whether he had worn the home jersey for the Shot game. Scheinman has said that he is "about 90 percent" confident that the home jersey is indeed the one Thomson was wearing when he hit the Shot: the Giants almost certainly wore the same uniforms for the Series—which began the day after the Shot game—that they used during the second half of the season (as did the Yankees), and Scheinman's jersey displays distinct puckering around the numbers, probably as a result of steam pressing, that is visible in photos of Thomson taken during and immediately after the Shot game. According to a professional textile conservator, such puckering cannot be mimicked or reproduced and would not repeat itself in exactly the same pattern on a different jersey.

The location of the ball is unknown. Documentary filmmaker and author Brian Biegel attempted unsuccessfully to authenticate a vintage baseball, autographed by several 1951 Giants, that his father had purchased at a thrift store for four dollars and believed to be Thomson's home run ball. He chronicled the project in his 2011 book Miracle Ball, followed by a documentary film of the same name.

== Legacy ==
The Shot game placed second on ESPN's SportsCentury ranking of the Ten Greatest Games of the 20th Century, behind the 1958 NFL Championship Game. Sports Illustrated ranked Thomson's home run fifteenth on its list of the 100 Greatest Moments in Sports History.

The event was recreated in Don DeLillo's story "Pafko at the Wall", subtitled "Shot Heard 'Round the World", originally published as a folio in the October 1992 issue of Harper's Magazine and re-released in 2001 as a novella. DeLillo recreates the game through the perspective of various witnesses, among them Frank Sinatra, Jackie Gleason and J. Edgar Hoover. The story grew into DeLillo's 1997 novel, Underworld, in which the fate of the ball is a central focus of subsequent events spread across decades.

In her memoir Wait Till Next Year, about her childhood as a Dodgers fan, historian Doris Kearns Goodwin writes that "From that moment to this, Bobby Thomson and the Brooklyn Dodgers would be forever linked, the mere mention of his name calling forth in every Dodgers fan instant recognition, comradeship, a memory of where they were, how they felt. I now live in the town of Concord, Massachusetts, not far from the Old North Bridge, where the American Revolution began. Whenever I take visitors to see the monument, and stand before the marble shaft, reading that lovely inscription which commemorates 'the shot heard round the world,' I think privately of Bobby Thomson's home run."
