= Shot heard round the world (disambiguation) =

Shot heard round the world most commonly refers to:

- The first American volley in Concord, Massachusetts on April 19, 1775, which began the American Revolutionary War.
- The Assassination of Archduke Franz Ferdinand in 1914, the first precipitant of World War I

Shot heard round the world may also refer to:

== Sport ==
- Shot Heard 'Round the World (baseball), a game-winning walk-off home run by New York Giants outfielder Bobby Thomson to win the National League pennant in 1951
- Shot heard round the world (soccer), Paul Caligiuri's winning goal for the United States men's national soccer team in the final qualifying round for the 1990 FIFA World Cup
- Shot heard round the world (golf), Gene Sarazen's holed second shot to make an albatross on the 15th hole in the final round of the 1935 Masters Tournament
- "The Shot Heard 'Round the World," a game-tying shot made by Gar Heard during the 1976 NBA Finals to force triple-overtime.

== Other ==
- "The Shot Heard 'Round the World", a song by Boys Like Girls from Love Drunk
- "The Shot Heard Round the World", a song from Schoolhouse Rock! which talks about the opening gunshot of the American Revolutionary War

== See also ==
- Hit heard round the world, an event in the 1964 American Football League Championship Game
- The slap heard around the world, when Will Smith slapped Chris Rock on stage during the 94th Academy Awards in 2022
