= Serendipity 3 =

Coordinates: 40°45′42.49″N 73°57′53.67″W

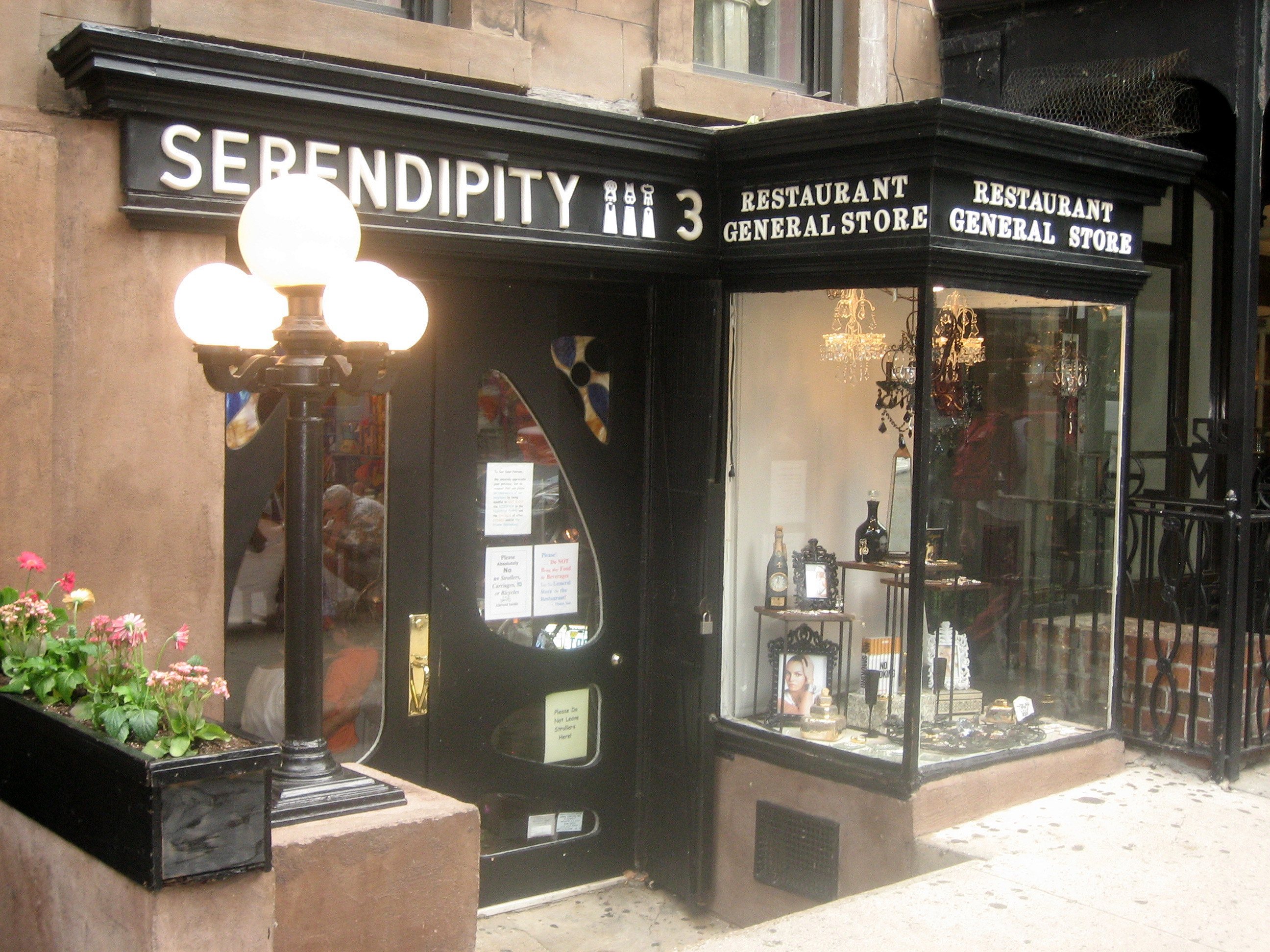
- Entrance to Serendipity 3, in 2007
- Interactive map of Serendipity 3

Restaurant information
- Established: 1954; 72 years ago
- Food type: Dessert, ice cream
- Location: 225 East 60th Street, New York City, New York, 10022, United States
- Other locations: 500 Boardwalk, Atlantic City, New Jersey 08401
- Website: http://www.serendipity3.com/

Serendipity 3, often written Serendipity III, is a restaurant located at 225 East 60th Street, between Second and Third avenues in New York City, founded by Calvin L Holt, Patch Caradine and Stephen Bruce in 1954. It also served as a boutique that sold one-of-a-kind fashion and artistic items and hosted famous artists and popular culture figures. The restaurant has been the scene of several films, including the 2001 romantic comedy Serendipity. American singer and actress Selena Gomez has an ownership stake in the restaurant.

== History ==
The restaurant's name is a reference to The Three Princes of Serendip, a Persian fairy tale. The restaurant has hosted many celebrities since its establishment in 1954. Regulars included Marilyn Monroe, Andy Warhol, and First Lady Jacqueline Kennedy.

Serendipity 3 opened a location in Westport CT in 1984 but closed it a year later. The restaurant for a number of years had a location in Boston at Faneuil Hall, but it closed in 1996, and later opened two new locations with one in Boca Raton in South Florida and another at Caesars Palace on the Las Vegas Strip. The Las Vegas location closed in January 2017, leaving the Boca Raton restaurant as the only location outside of New York open.

In 2004, Serendipity celebrated its fiftieth anniversary by introducing the Golden Opulence Sundae, listed in the Guinness Book of World Records as the most expensive dessert, at $1000. It is made with three scoops of the Tahitian vanilla bean ice cream infused with Madagascar vanilla; covered in 23K edible gold leaf; drizzled with the world's most expensive chocolate, Amedei Porcelana; and covered with chunks of Chuao chocolate, which is from cocoa beans harvested by the Caribbean Sea on Venezuela's coast. It is suffused with exotic candied fruits from Paris, gold dragées, truffles, and Marzipan Cherries. Finally, it is topped with a tiny glass bowl of Grand Passion Caviar, an exclusive dessert caviar made of salt-free American Golden caviar, known for its sparkling golden color. It is sweetened and infused with passion fruit, orange, and Armagnac. The sundae is served in a Baccarat Harcourt crystal goblet (which the buyer gets to keep) with an 18K gold spoon, a petite mother of pearl spoon, and topped with a gilded sugar flower by Ron Ben-Israel.

In 2007, Serendipity 3 was forced to temporarily close after failing two consecutive health inspections in a single month. Health inspectors found a live mouse, mouse droppings, flies and live cockroaches.

On Memorial Day, May 30, 2011, Serendipity 3 opened a new restaurant on the historic corner of M Street and Wisconsin Avenue in the heart of Washington, D.C.'s popular Georgetown shopping district. However, it closed on June 3, 2014. Like the New York location, the D.C. locale hosted many opulent and playful oddities, including an eight-foot fiberglass smirking Abraham Lincoln statue, designed by high-profile D.C. artist and prop designer A. J. Strasser. The Georgetown restaurant also featured a historical clock from landmark D.C. jeweler Galt & Bros, established in 1802 and one of the longest running businesses in D.C., as well as a 1960s photograph of Andy Warhol and Serendipity 3 co-founder Stephen Bruce.

There was also a Serendipity 3 in Harajuku, in Tokyo, Japan. (Permanently closed.)

In February 2019 they released a line of 8 flavors of ice cream pints at 7-Eleven locations around the country.

A new location was opened in Times Square at 157 W 47th St, between Sixth and Seventh Avenues in September 2024.

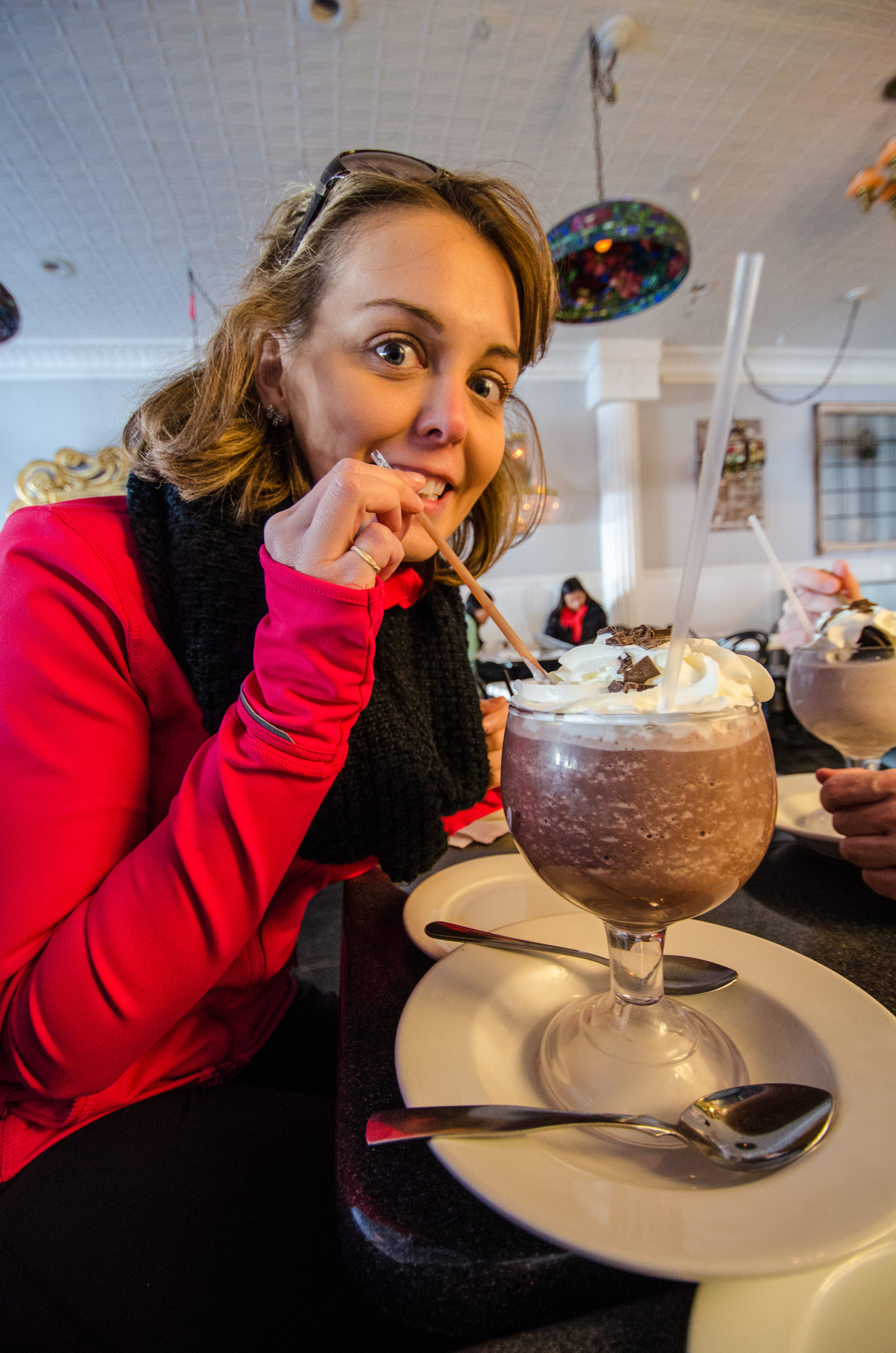
Women drinking frozen hot chocolate in the Washington DC location in 2013

== Media ==
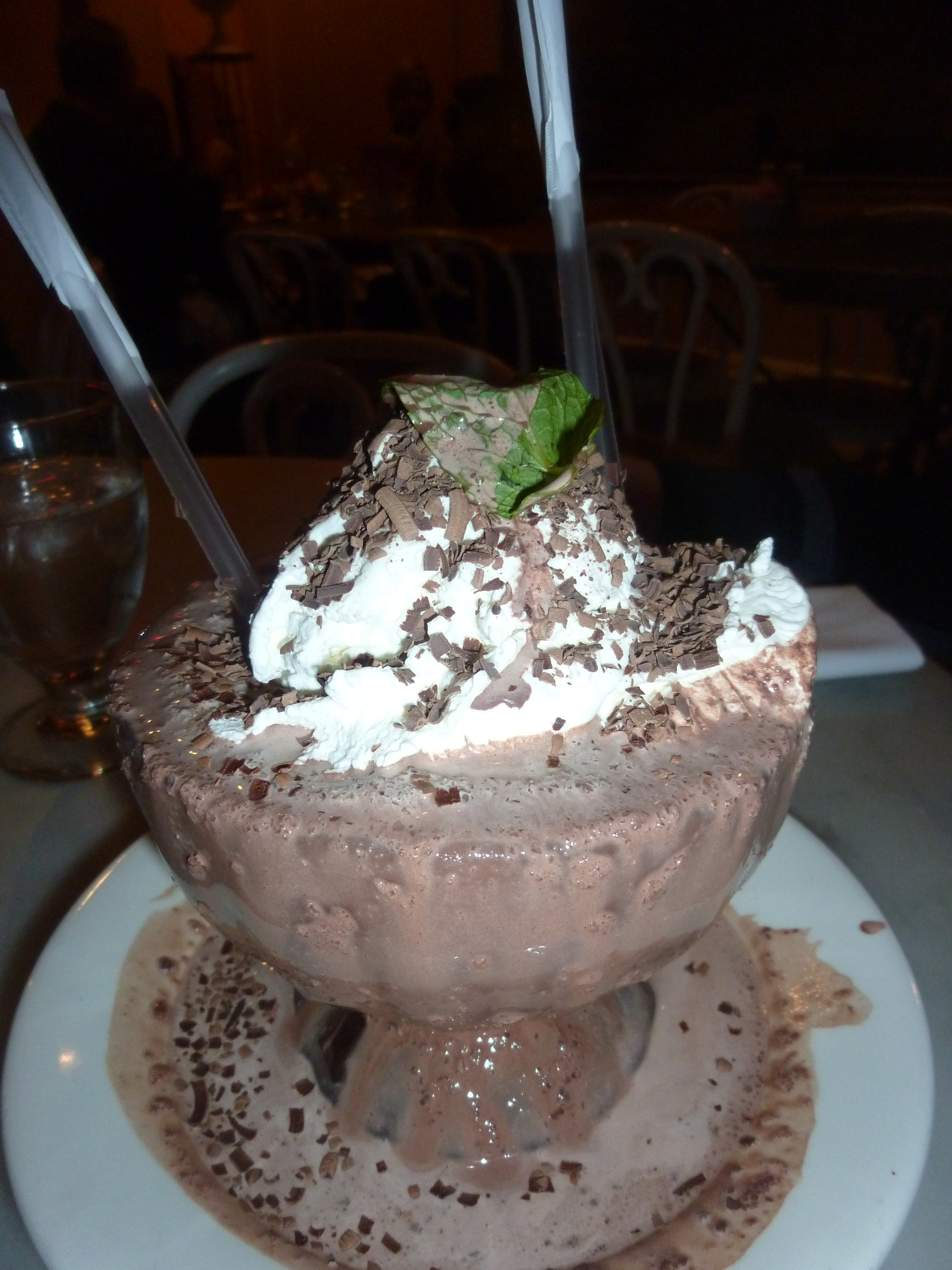
Frrrozen Hot Chocolate with Mint

Serendipity 3 has appeared prominently in at least two major movies. The movie most associated with the restaurant is its namesake Serendipity. Released in 2001, it centers on a couple that meet by chance while shopping at Bloomingdale's, and share dessert at the restaurant later that same night.

One Fine Day, released in 1996, also has a scene in the restaurant, featuring the Frrrozen Hot Chocolate.

Trust the Man, released in 2006, includes a scene of David Duchovny's character being invited to Serendipity 3 by a potential love interest, and then at the restaurant on the first floor eating.

The second novel in the Gossip Girl series, You Know You Love Me, includes a scene in which Serena and Dan visit Serendipity 3 and, respectively, order a peppermint sundae and a coffee banana split.

The third episode of the second season of Girls mentioned the Serendipity Frrrozen Hot chocolate.

E!'s Joan & Melissa: Joan Knows Best? features Joan and Melissa Rivers eating ice cream at Serendipity 3.

In the Elsbeth episode "Hot Tub Crime Machine", Elsbeth suggests frozen hot chocolate at Serendipity 3 as a good start to a date when giving advice to a colleague.

== Records ==
In November 2007, Serendipity unveiled a $1,000 dessert called the "Golden Opulence Sundae", which Guinness World Records declared the world's most expensive dessert. The restaurant also serves the Frozen Chocolate Haute dessert, priced at $25,000.

In May 2012, Serendipity 3 was recognized as the Guinness World Record holder for serving the world's most expensive hamburger, the $295 Le Burger Extravagant.

In October 2014, Serendipity 3 was recognized as the Guinness World Record holder for serving the world's most expensive, commercially available sandwich, the $214, "Quintessential Grilled Cheese"
