= Opulence =

Opulence refers to great wealth or abundance.

It can also refer to:

- Opulence (EP), an extended-play album by rapper Brooke Candy
  - "Opulence", the first song from the EP
- Golden Opulence Sundae, the world-record most expensive sundae dessert
