= Santiago Mariño Municipality =

Santiago Mariño Municipality Municipio Santiago Mariño
- Municipality
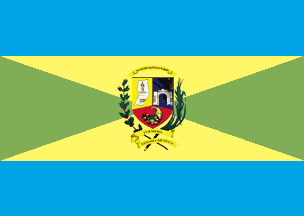
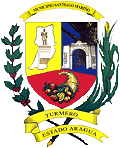
- Flag Coat of arms

- Location in Aragua

- Location in Venezuela
- Coordinates: 10°21′39″N 67°28′51″W
- Country: Venezuela
- State: Aragua

Government
  - Mayor: Carlos Guzmán Venot (PSUV)

Area
  - Total: 494.0 km^{2} (190.7 sq mi)

Population (2011)
  - Total: 211,010
  - Density: 427.1/km^{2} (1,106/sq mi)
- Time zone: UTC−4 (VET)
- Area code(s): 0244
- Website: Official website

The Santiago Mariño Municipality is one of the 18 municipalities (municipios) that makes up the Venezuelan state of Aragua and, according to the 2011 census by the National Institute of Statistics of Venezuela, the municipality has a population of 211,010. The town of Turmero is the shire town of the Santiago Mariño Municipality and Chuao where some of the finest cocoa beans in the world are produced. The municipality is named for Venezuelan independence hero Santiago Mariño.

== Demographics ==
The Santiago Mariño Municipality, according to a 2007 population estimate by the National Institute of Statistics of Venezuela, has a population of 191,731 (up from 165,436 in 2000). This amounts to 11.5% of the state's population. The municipality's population density is 385.78 inhabitants per square kilometre (999.2/sq mi).

== Government ==
The mayor of the Santiago Mariño Municipality is Francisco J. Gerratana, elected on October 31, 2004 with 62% of the vote. He replaced Efren Rodriguez shortly after the elections. The municipality is divided into five parishes; Capital Santiago Mariño, Arévalo Aponte (separated from Capital Santiago Mariño parish effective January 30, 1995), Chuao, Samán de Güere, and Alfredo Pacheco Miranda (separated from Samán de Güere parish effective December 16, 1997).

== Chuao ==
Chuao is a small village founded in the 16th century famous in the world for its cacao plantations. The village is surrounded by mountains and dense rainforests to the south Caribbean Sea near the Henri Pittier National Park. There is no road access and visitors must come by boat from the town of Puerto Colombia along the coast, or by foot, crossing the mountains and the luxurious cloud forest from Turmero near Maracay.

In the Chuao plantation there are currently pure Criollo and hybrid varieties of cacao being grown. Criollo beans from Chuao are of very high quality, and are considered Venezuela's finest beans together with Porcelana Blanca beans from Lake Maracaibo (another genetically pure variety of Criollo). Amedei, an Italian chocolate maker, and Chocolate NAIVE, a Lithuanian bean-to-bar chocolate maker, offer chocolate bars made with Chuao cacao. Naive was the winner of the European gold medal at the International Chocolate Awards 2014.

In November 2000, the cacao beans coming from Chuao region were awarded an appellation of origin under the title "Cacao de Chuao" (from Spanish Cacao de Chuao) effectively making this one of the most expensive and sought after types of cacao.

== Gallery ==
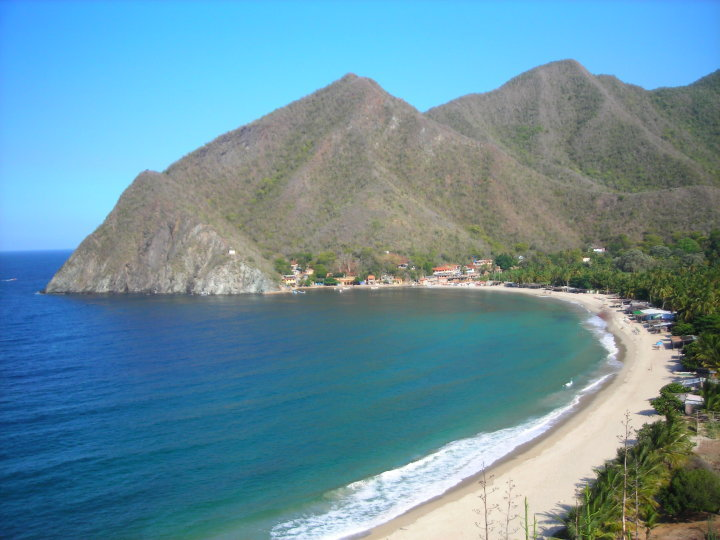
Chuao Bay

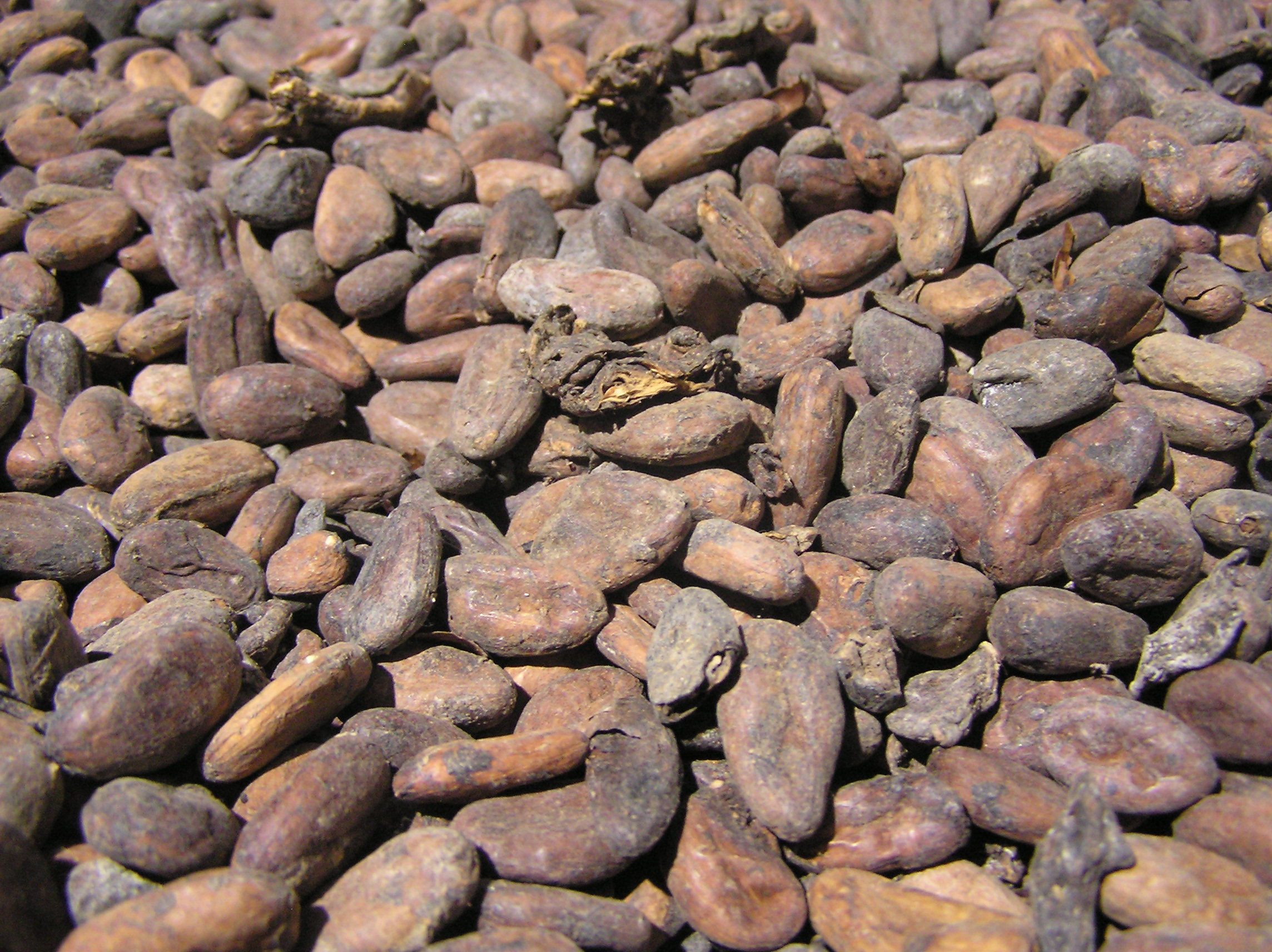
Cacao beans

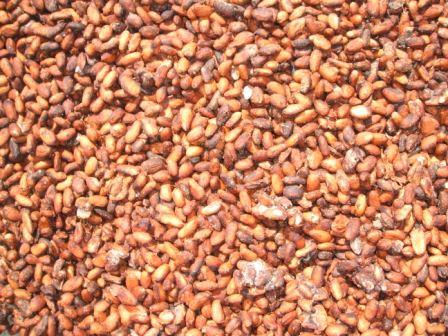
Chuao cocoa beans under the sun

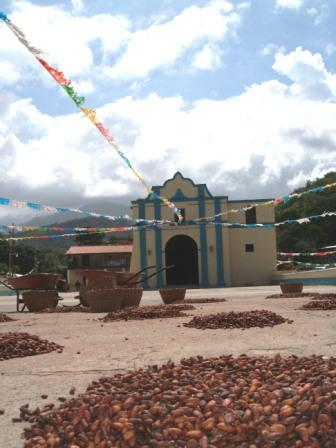
Plaza de Secado. The Church yard where the cocoa beans are sun dried

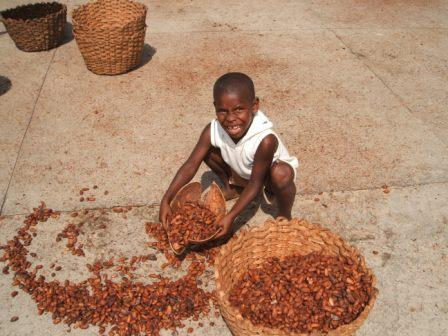
Plaza de Secado. Boy helping his mother to collect the cocoa beans. Chuao. Venezuela

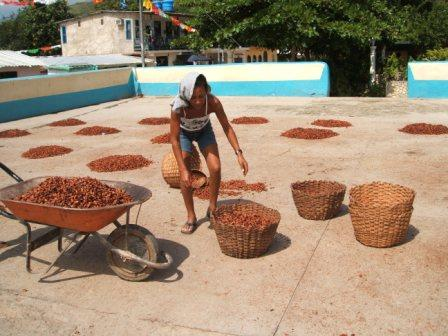
Plaza de Secado. The mother collecting the cocoa away from the sun. Chuao. Venezuela

Cocoa under fermentation process

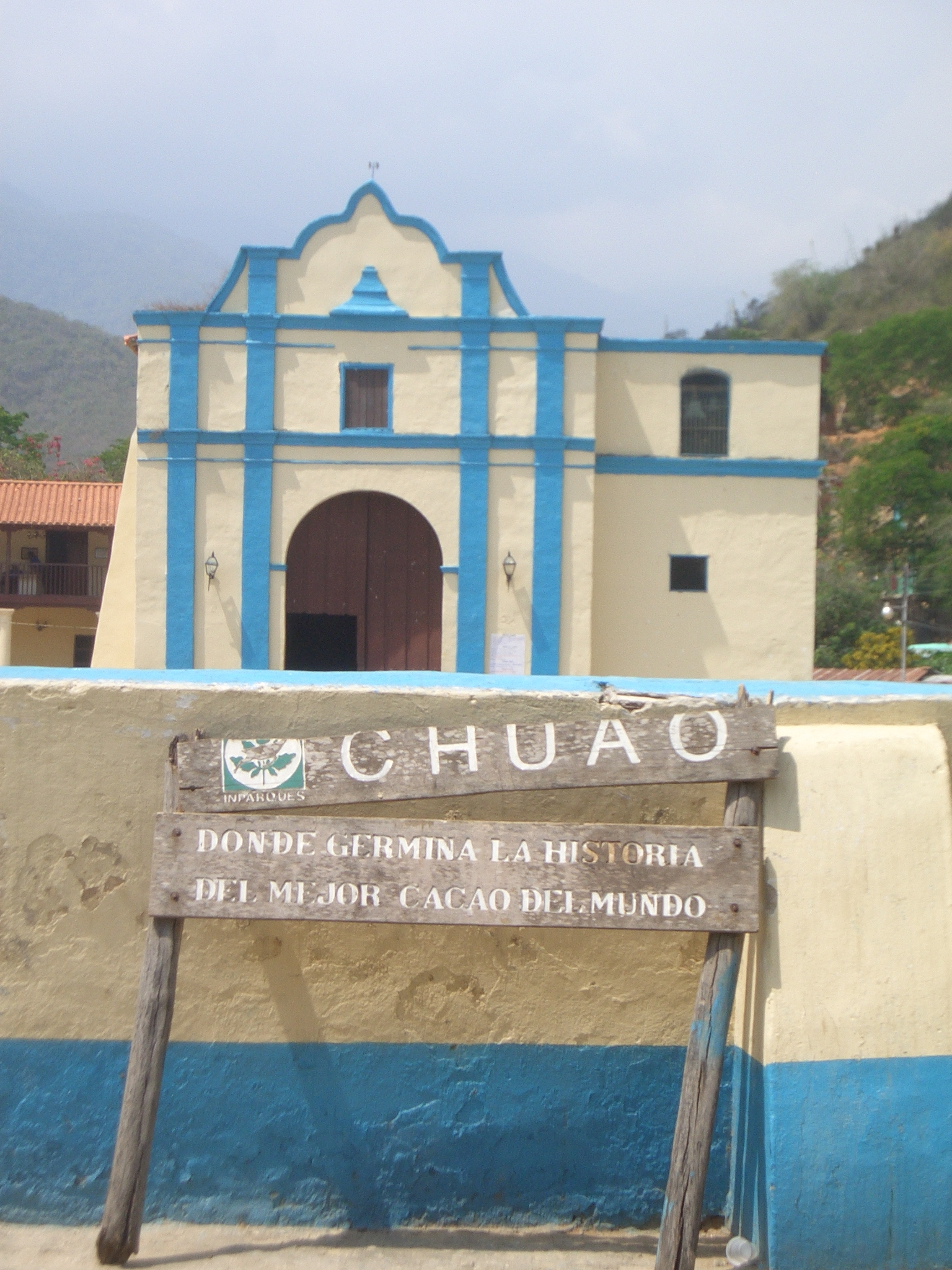
Chuao church

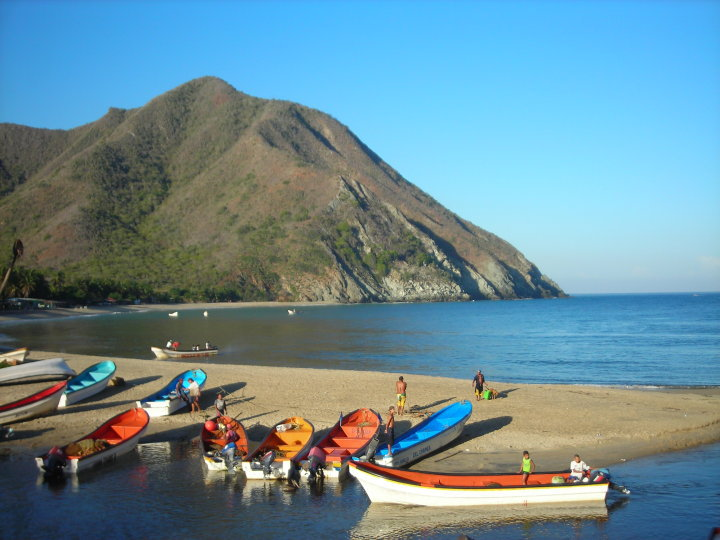
Chuao Fishers boats

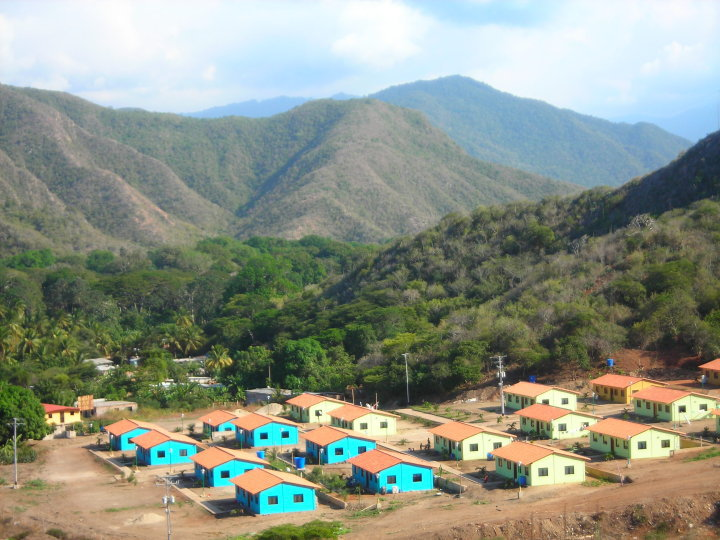
Chuao new town
