= Golden Opulence Sundae =

World-record most expensive ice cream sundae

The Golden Opulence Sundae is a sundae that is served by special order at the New York City restaurant Serendipity 3. In 2007 it was listed in Guinness World Records as the most expensive sundae in the world at a price of US$1,000. The restaurant has stated that they sell approximately one per month. It was created to celebrate the eatery's 50th – "golden" – anniversary in 2005. Owner Stephen Bruce states that a notice 48 hours in advance is needed when requesting the Sundae, since the ingredients must be flown in from different parts of the world.

== Ingredients ==
Golden Opulence Sundae is made using three scoops of rich Tahitian vanilla bean ice cream infused with Madagascar vanilla and covered in 23k edible gold leaf. (Edible gold leaf is made from pure gold that is compressed or rolled into very thin sheets that are only a few micrometers thick and contain no other metals or impurities.) The chocolate syrup used is from melted Amedei Porcelana, one of the world's most expensive chocolates; and covered with chunks of rare Chuao chocolate, which is from cocoa beans harvested by the Caribbean Sea on Venezuela's coast. The sundae is then adorned with "exotic candied fruits from Paris, gold covered almonds/dragets, chocolate truffles and marzipan cherries." Added to the dessert is a tiny glass bowl of Grand Passion Caviar, an exclusive dessert caviar, made of salt-free American Golden caviar, known for its sparkling golden color. It's sweetened and infused with fresh passion fruit, orange and Armagnac. It is finally topped off with a gilded sugar flower and sprinkled with small flakes of more edible gold. The sundae comes in a $350 Baccarat Harcourt crystal goblet which the buyer gets to keep.

== Reception ==
The sundae was used as a gag on the US NBC television series 30 Rock. It was also previously featured on Forbes' list of the world's most expensive desserts until being dropped in 2008 along with Serendipity 3's $25,000 Frozen Haute Chocolate.
