= Francisco José Cróquer =

- Born: May 23, 1920; Turmero, Aragua, Venezuela
- Died: December 18, 1955 (aged 35); Barranquilla, Colombia
- Occupation(s): Sportscaster, racing driver
- Years active: 1938–1955
- Awards: Venezuelan Baseball Hall of Fame and Museum induction (2005)

Francisco José Cróquer [crocker] (May 23, 1920 – December 18, 1955) was a Venezuelan sportscaster specialized in baseball and boxing. He was popularly known as Pancho Pepe Cróquer.

== Early life ==
Born in Turmero, Aragua, Cróquer was the son of Cirilo and Francisca (née Páez) Cróquer. He studied at José Rafael Revenga elementary school in his native Turmero, and later graduated from high school at Liceo Maracay. At an early age he became interested in road bicycle racing, while also wearing the uniform of a local baseball team, but it was in auto racing where he was known for his passion and courage as a real sportsman.

As a teenager, Cróquer received hands-on experience working at La Voz de Aragua radio station, where he performed as a tango singer, poetic declaimer, comedian and substitute announcer, as well as other programming and station responsibilities. In 1938 he moved to Caracas to work in Estudios Universo, a radio station which was later called Ondas Populares. While there, he hosted a daily sports program and broadcast baseball games and boxing. He then extended his activities to Radio Caracas Televisión in 1953, where he hosted TV shows and anchored the first-ever telecast in Venezuelan baseball history. Furthermore, he served as the chief editor for the magazine Venezuela Deportiva and hosted a poetry radio program. Besides, Cróquer achieved international renown and became a household name in Latino communities when he joined the Gillette Cavalcade of Sports in the late 1940s. By then, the Cavalcade was aired through NBC Red Network and extended their Spanish programming activities to Latin American countries, where it was known as the Cabalgata Deportiva Gillette. Its schedule included the MLB Game of the Week aired on Saturday afternoons, the MLB All-Star Game in the midseason and the fall World Series. On there, Cróquer shared duties with other Spanish-language broadcasters such as Buck Canel and Felo Ramírez. During the opening presentation, Canel habitually introduced Cróquer as La Voz Deportiva de América.

== Sports broadcasting ==
In addition, the Cavalcade broadcast the bouts of every great fighter of the time, including Rocky Marciano, Archie Moore, Willie Pep, Sugar Ray Robinson, Sandy Saddler and Jersey Joe Walcott, whose matches were accurately and succinctly described by Cróquer on its Friday nights broadcasts from Madison Square Garden. He is particularly remembered for his emotional description on the second of four matches held between Pep and Saddler, which was aired in February 1949.

== Baseball's popularity in Venezuela, Croquer's emergence ==
The first high point for Venezuela in international baseball came in 1941, when its national team captured the 1941 Amateur World Series tournament against host country Cuba, which gripped the attention of the nation. After that, baseball's position as the national sport in Venezuela was consolidated, and it has never been seriously challenged since then. The professional game in Venezuela was established in 1945, when a group of four club owners created the Venezuelan Professional Baseball League and joined organized baseball.

Since the emergence of radio-broadcast baseball in the country, Venezuela's love and fascination with the sport was increased by the play-by-play announcers who described and interpreted the resulting action with their own conversational style and knowledge of the game. From the outset, Cróquer showed the most recognizable voice in Venezuelan baseball, thanks largely to his clear baritone voice and a friendly style combined with a high knowledge of the game, but always with an enviable capability to narrate a story in the form of a novel and showing a great mastery of the Spanish language. As a result, his listeners undoubtedly and proudly dubbed him, simply, Pancho Pepe, and it took a little longer than that for him to build a solid fanbase and reach national legend status.

== Sports car racing ==
Meanwhile, Cróquer also competed regularly in sports car racing. In 1948 he participated in the Gran Premio de la América del Turismo Carretera, which was a touring car racing competition organized by the Automóvil Club Argentino throughout 9,579 km (5,950 miles) and distributed in 14 stages between Buenos Aires and Caracas. He then won the national championship in 1954 and joined the Maserati team in the First International Grand Prix of Caracas in November 1955, where he faced Jean Behra, Eugenio Castellotti, Juan Manuel Fangio, Stirling Moss, Luigi Musso and Alfonso de Portago, among other driving celebrities.

== Death ==
A short time after that, Cróquer was competing in the Carrera de la Cordialidad, held in December 1955 between the cities of Barranquilla and Cartagena in Colombia. He was fatally injured when his Maserati 200S apparently suffered a mechanical failure on a fast curve, which caused the car to somersault a number of times. Cróquer was killed almost instantly due to the force of the crash resulting in massive and lethal internal injuries. He was 35 years old.

A crowd of about 50,000 people attended his mourning ceremony in Caracas and later escorted the funeral cortège to his resting place in the Southern General Cemetery.

In 2005, Cróquer was enshrined into the Venezuelan Baseball Hall of Fame and Museum as part of its third class. Two years later, the Estadio Pancho Pepe Cróquer was dedicated in his honor. There are other similar dedications to Cróquer around the country. In Aragua state, the Turagua racing circuit was renamed Autódromo Internacional de Turagua Pancho Pepe Cróquer, while an avenue in Valencia, Carabobo is named Avenida Pancho Pepe Cróquer.
