= Amedei Porcelana =

Chocolate known as the world's most expensive

Amedei Porcelana chocolate bar

Amedei Porcelana is a dark chocolate bar made by the Amedei luxury chocolatier of Tuscany, Italy. It is often known as the world's most expensive chocolate. It has won various awards from the "Academy of Chocolate", including "Best Bean to Bar", "Best Dark Chocolate Bar", and the "Golden Bean Award."

== Manufacture ==
The cocoa in Amedei Porcelana is from translucent white cocoa beans of the variety "Porcelana", named for their porcelain-like color. This cocoa bean, a genetically pure strain of the highly-prized Criollo, is native to Venezuela and may have been grown there in the pre-Columbian era.

Porcelana cocoa was called "Maracaibo" in colonial times, since it was primarily exported from that Venezuelan port community. Along with a few other Mexican and Colombian cocoa beans, Maracaibo cocoa was classified as one of the world's highest quality cocoas until the 1920s.

Today, many of these Mexican and Colombian cocoas have disappeared and have been replaced by more disease-resistant hybrids. Maracaibo, or Porcelana cocoa is grown on small plantations in Venezuela. Amedei produces about 20,000 bars a year from this cocoa bean.

== Packaging ==
Amedei Porcelana is sold in individually-numbered packages that have been called "the reference standard for the industry on how to package a chocolate bar."

== Price ==
A 1.75 oz Amedei Porcelana bar sells in the United States for $21. The often-quoted price of this chocolate is $90 a pound. Amedei Porcelana has often been described as the world's most expensive chocolate, and has been recognized as such by the Guinness Book of World Records.

== Golden Opulence Sundae and Golden Phoenix Cupcake ==
Porcelana is included in the Golden Opulence Sundae, a $1,000 dessert sold at the Serendipity 3 restaurant in New York City and mentioned in the Guinness Book of World Records. Porcelana is also used in making the most expensive cupcake, the Golden Phoenix, which is made by Bloomsbury's, a boutique cafe in Dubai.
