= Gillette Cavalcade of Sports =

American sports anthology series

- Also known as: Cavalcade of Sports (1942–1946; as radio program)
- Genre: Sports anthology series
- Presented by: Bob Stanton; Ray Forrest; Jimmy Powers
- Theme music composer: Mahlon Merrick
- Opening theme: "Look Sharp/Be Sharp March"
- Country of origin: United States
- Original language: English
- No. of seasons: 14

Production
- Producers: Bill Garden; Jack Mills
- Camera setup: Multi-camera
- Running time: 120 minutes
- Production company: NBC Sports

Original release
- Network: NBC
- Release: November 8, 1946 – June 24, 1960

The Gillette Cavalcade of Sports is an American radio-turned-television program by the National Broadcasting Company (NBC) that ran from 1942 to 1960. The program included broadcasts of a variety of sports, although it is primarily remembered for its focus on boxing matches.

== Overview and background ==
The Cavalcade of Sports officially began on radio in 1942 as the Gillette Company grouped various existing sports sponsorships under one banner. The sponsorships had begun three years earlier, according to an article on the Gillette Company in Vol. 68 of the International Directory of Company Histories. In 1939, Gillette president Joseph Spang purchased the sponsorship rights to the World Series on behalf of Gillette for $100,000. A special promotion of Gillette razors and blueblades sold four times better than company estimates, resulting in the company seeking out additional sponsorships for sporting events.

The Gillette stable of radio sports programs spanned several different networks (including the NBC Red Network, CBS Radio Network and the Mutual Broadcasting System) and grew to include not only ongoing sponsorship deals with Major League Baseball for the World Series and All-Star Game, but the annual Kentucky Derby horse race and the Cotton Bowl Classic and Orange Bowl in college football. In his book about Gillette's history Cutting Edge, author Gordon McKibben wrote, "most males in the 1940s and 1950s did not have to be told that the Cavalcade of Sports meant Gillette was sponsoring another ball game or horse race".

The diversified field of sporting events continued onto television, reportedly including at least two golfing tournaments as well as college football's Blue–Gray Classic and (beginning in 1958) the Rose Bowl game. As late as 1988, the Cavalcade of Sports banner was used in connection with Gillette's sponsorship of the NHL's Stanley Cup Playoffs. Internationally, the Gillette World Sports program continues the concept to the present day in many international regions from Ireland to Africa to Asia.

With all of this, however, the Cavalcade of Sports was best known for its Friday night boxing broadcasts that aired on NBC from 1946 to 1960, and then, after NBC decided against featuring boxing due to sensitivity over criminal allegations in the sport, for several more years on ABC.

=== As Cavalcade of Sports ===
Its earlier iteration, Cavalcade of Sports, likewise a boxing show, ran on NBC's New York City station WNBT (channel 4, now WNBC) intermittently beginning in 1943 and was picked up by the NBC television network three years later. The twice-weekly 1946 shows began on Monday, November 8 at 9:00 p.m. and Friday, November 12 at 9:30 p.m. Eastern Time. Both were open-ended programs – as the station signed off the air after the last bout ended (in the early days of television, most stations did not have late-night local newscasts).

St. Nicholas Arena in New York City was the site of the earliest bouts and continued to host the Monday night fights until that program's cancellation in May 1949.

=== As Gillette Cavalcade of Sports ===
The Friday night program, broadcast from Madison Square Garden lasted until June 24, 1960, a 14-year period which is, by far, the longest continuous run of any boxing program in television history. The Gillette sponsorship began at the start of the first full television programming season, 1948-49. On September 4, the program was retitled The Gillette Cavalcade of Sports, a name that remained until the end of its run. Every great boxer of the time – including among others Rocky Marciano, Sugar Ray Robinson, Archie Moore, Rocky Graziano, Willie Pep – appeared on one or more of its broadcasts.

In the early years of television, there was a saturation of boxing programs, as many as six prime-time network programs in one week, not even counting the myriad local shows. With so much boxing airing simultaneously, all weight divisions had a chance at stardom, not just heavyweight contenders.

=== Commentators ===
Bob Haymes (using the stage name Bob Stanton) was the program's original announcer; he was joined by Ray Forrest in 1948. Jimmy Powers took over the role in 1949 and remained NBC's main boxing announcer until the network ceased carrying prime time boxing matches in 1960.

=== Theme music ===
The show's theme music was the "Look Sharp/Be Sharp March" by Mahlon Merrick, an upbeat tune that was recorded, published (and sheet music printed) sometime between 1953 and 1956. It received quite a bit of airplay on U.S. radio programs, and was used in the repertoire of many high school and college bands of the period. There is a 1954 rendition of the song by the Boston Pops under Arthur Fiedler on YouTube.

The "March" was used in the 1980 film Raging Bull during a scene in which the Robert De Niro character Jake LaMotta unveils his new nightclub. Coleco's Head-to-Head Boxing handheld video game, released in 1981, played the most identifiable eight-note part of the tune when turned on and the first three notes of that at the start of each round. The music is also used in the Punch-Out!! series of video games published by Nintendo, and the 1993 Argentine film Gatica, el mono.

=== Recognition ===
==== Awards and nominations ====
The Gillette Cavalcade of Sports won an Emmy Award for Best Sports Program in 1955. It also received an Emmy nomination for Best Sports or News Program in 1954.

==== Nielsen ratings ====
According to Nielsen, the program finished at #6 for the 1950–51 season; it slide to #19 in 1951-52 and then to #24 in 1952–53 before rebounding somewhat to #18 in 1953–54. No other boxing series has ever ranked in the Nielsen top 10 in its season ratings.

== Latin America ==
In the late 1940s, when the Cavalcade was aired through NBC Red Network extended their Spanish programming activities to Latin American countries, where it was known as the Cabalgata Deportiva Gillette. Its schedule included the MLB Game of the Week aired on Saturday afternoons, the MLB All-Star Game in the midseason and the fall World Series. On there, shared duties Spanish-language broadcasters such as Pancho Pepe Cróquer, Buck Canel, and Felo Ramírez. During the opening presentation, Canel habitually introduced Cróquer as La Voz Deportiva de América.

In addition, the Cavalcade broadcast the bouts of every great fighter of the time, including Rocky Marciano, Archie Moore, Willie Pep, Sugar Ray Robinson, Sandy Saddler and Jersey Joe Walcott, whose fights were accurately and succinctly described by Cróquer on its Friday nights broadcasts from Madison Square Garden. He is particularly remembered for his emotional description on the second of four matches held between Pep and Saddler, which was aired in February 1949.

== United Kingdom ==
The imitatively-titled, but otherwise unrelated, series Cavalcade of Sport aired on ITV in the United Kingdom in 1956, early in the British commercial network's life.
