= Estadio Pancho Pepe Cróquer =

Venezuelan baseball stadium

Coordinates: 9°54′N 67°21′W

- Interactive map of Estadio Pancho Pepe Cróquer
- Location: San Juan de los Morros, Guárico, Venezuela
- Operator: Instituto Regional de Deporte del Estado Guárico
- Capacity: 3,000
- Surface: Grass

Construction
- Opened: 2007
- Renovated: 2011

The Estadio Pancho Pepe Cróquer is a baseball and softball stadium located in San Juan de los Morros, the capital city of Guarico state in Venezuela. It has a capacity of 3,000 people and is used for amateur play and special events. The stadium was named after Francisco José Cróquer, a distinguished sportscaster and racing driver who was popularly known as Pancho Pepe Cróquer.

== Sources ==
- Instituto Regional de Deporte del Estado Guárico
- Google Maps
