= Turmero =

Turmero Villa de Nuestra Señora de Candelaria de Turmero
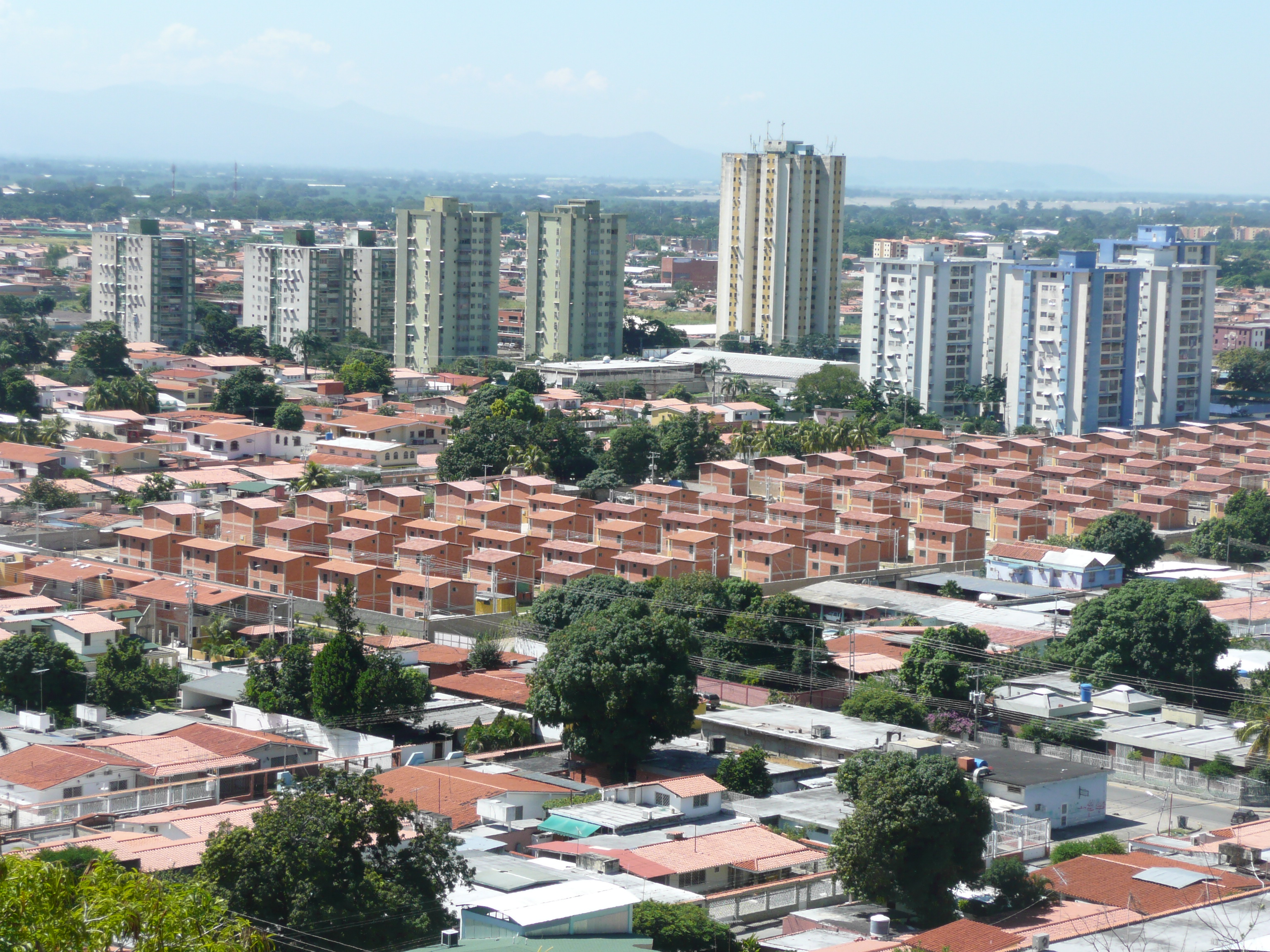
- Part of Turmero

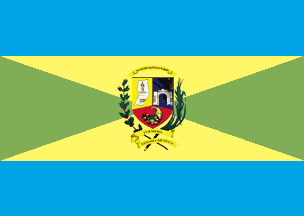
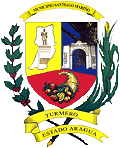
- Flag Coat of arms

- Location within Venezuela
- Coordinates: 10°13′42″N 67°28′21″W
- Country: Venezuela
- State: Aragua
- Counties: Mariño
- Founded: 27 November 1620

Government
  - Mayor: Carlos Guzmán Venot (PSUV)

Area
  - Total: 36.28 km^{2} (14.01 sq mi)
- Elevation: 446 m (1,463 ft)

Population (2001)
  - Total: 51,235
  - Density: 1,412/km^{2} (3,658/sq mi)
  - Demonym: Turmereno(-a)
- Time zone: UTC−4 (VET)
- Postal code: 2115
- Area code: +58 244
- Climate: Aw
- Website: santiagomarino-aragua.gov.ve

Turmero is a city in the state of Aragua in northern Venezuela. It is the capital of Santiago Mariño Municipality.

The city was officially established on 27 November 1620 with the founding of a church, Iglesia Nuestra Señora de Candelaria, in an existing village.

Turmero had a station on the Great Venezuela Railway between Caracas and Valencia. This line opened in the 1890s and closed in the 1960s.

There is an important road junction at La Encrucijada de Turmero.

== Landmarks ==
- Universidad Bicentenaria de Aragua (established in 1986)

== Notable people ==
- Bobby Abreu (born 1974), professional baseball player
- Francisco José Cróquer (1920–1955), sportscaster and racing driver
- William Cuevas (born 1990), professional baseball player
- Francisco Linares Alcántara (1825–1878), President of Venezuela
- Yohan Pino (born 1983), professional baseball player
- Abraham Torres (born 1968), Olympic boxer
- José Luis Valbuena (born 1971), Pan American Games boxer
- Stephanie de Zorzi (born 1993), Model and Miss Earth Venezuela 2016

== See also ==
- List of cities and towns in Venezuela

== Sources ==
- Turmero – Historia, geografía, personajes y cultura (Spanish)
- Turmero – Historia, huellas y testimonio (Spanish)
