= Felo Ramírez =

American baseball announcer

- Born: Rafael Ramírez Arias; 22 June 1923; Bayamo, Cuba
- Died: 21 August 2017 (aged 94); Miami, Florida, US
- Occupations: Baseball play-by-play announcer, boxing analyst
- Years active: 1945–2017
- Employer: Miami Marlins
- Baseball career

Member of the Caribbean

Baseball Hall of Fame
- Induction: 2003

Rafael "Felo" Ramírez (22 June 1923 – 21 August 2017) was a Cuban-American Spanish language sports announcer, most notably for the Miami Marlins.

Born in Bayamo, Cuba, Ramirez was also a boxing expert, having broadcast fights for Latin American radio and television audiences since 1949 along with other Spanish-language broadcasters such as Buck Canel and, Pancho Pepe Cróquer when the Gillette Cavalcade of Sports, aired through NBC Red Network, extended their Spanish programming activities to Latin American countries, where it was known as the Cabalgata Deportiva Gillette.

== Career ==
Ramirez called 40 Caribbean World Series. He served as a broadcaster for nine years in his native Cuba, before leaving for Venezuela, Puerto Rico, and Mexico. From 1993 until April 2017, he was the Spanish radio announcer for the Miami Marlins. He called many baseball moments in his career, including Don Larsen's perfect game, Roberto Clemente's 3,000th Major League hit, and Hank Aaron's 715th home run.

As a Marlins broadcaster, Ramirez called both the 1997 and 2003 World Series. He also called numerous boxing matches, including many involving Muhammad Ali.

During the mid-1980s, Ramirez and Puerto Rican sportscaster and boxing promoter Ivonne Class co-hosted a weekly, Saturday nights boxing television show on Tele-Once, the returning television channel that had once been one of Puerto Rico's most seen TV stations, featuring live telecasts of Class-promoted bouts and also recorded fights of the past, like Muhammad Ali-Bob Foster.

== Personal life ==
Ramírez was born in Bayamo, Cuba, and was commonly known as "El Orgullo de Bayamo" ("The Pride of Bayamo") by many fans and colleagues. A longtime resident of Puerto Rico, he was inducted in the Puerto Rican Sports Hall of Fame and has been honored by the local legislature.

== Death ==
Ramirez was hospitalized after a fall in April 2017. He died on August 21, 2017, at the age of 94.

== Awards and honors ==
In 2001, Ramirez received the Ford C. Frick Award from the National Baseball Hall of Fame. His speech, delivered entirely in his native Spanish, was translated by Jaime Jarrin. In 2003, he was inducted into the Caribbean Baseball Hall of Fame.

In 2012, Ramirez received a recognition in Valencia, Venezuela. The Navegantes del Magallanes organization honored his career of more than 60 years as a sports play by play announcer by inducting him into their team Hall of Fame.
