= Buck Canel =

American-Spanish language sportscaster

- Canel in the 1970s
- Born: Eloy Justino Buxo Canel; March 4, 1906; Rosario, Argentina
- Died: April 7, 1980 (aged 74); Croton-On-Hudson, New York, U.S.
- Sports commentary career
- Genre: Play-by-play
- Sport: Major League Baseball

Eloy Justino Buxo "Buck" Canel (March 4, 1906–April 7, 1980) was an American Spanish language sportscaster of Major League Baseball games. Canel was born in Argentina when his father was working for the Spanish consulate in that country. His famous catchphrase was "¡No se vayan, que esto se pone bueno!" ("Don't go away, this is getting good!").

== Career ==
Canel achieved international renown and became a household name in Latino communities when he joined in the late 1940s the Gillette Cavalcade of Sports. By then, the Cavalcade was aired through NBC Red Network and extended their Spanish programming activities to Latin American countries, where it was known as La Cabalgata Deportiva Gillette. On there Canel shared duties with Spanish-language broadcasters such as Pancho Pepe Cróquer, Omar Lares, and Felo Ramírez. During the opening presentation, Canel habitually introduced Cróquer as La Voz Deportiva de América.

From 1954 to 1957, Canel called select Brooklyn Dodgers games over radio station WHOM, which was then a Spanish-language radio station in New York City. In the 1970s he called New York Mets and New York Yankees games, again for WHOM. These feeds were occasionally simulcast by Latin American radio stations.

Starting in 1937 until 1979, he was the Spanish voice of the World Series. He called a total of 42 World Series.

== Personal life ==
Fidel Castro was somewhat an advocate for Canel. Castro listened to him regularly and even spoke with him on at least one occasion.

Canel died of emphysema on April 7, 1980 in Croton-on-Hudson, New York.

== Legacy ==
Canel was posthumously awarded the Ford C. Frick Award by the National Baseball Hall of Fame in 1985. He began his career in journalism.

The call letters of WHOM are now used for an easy listening station in Portland, Maine.
