= Shot heard round the world =

Phrase referring to historical incidents

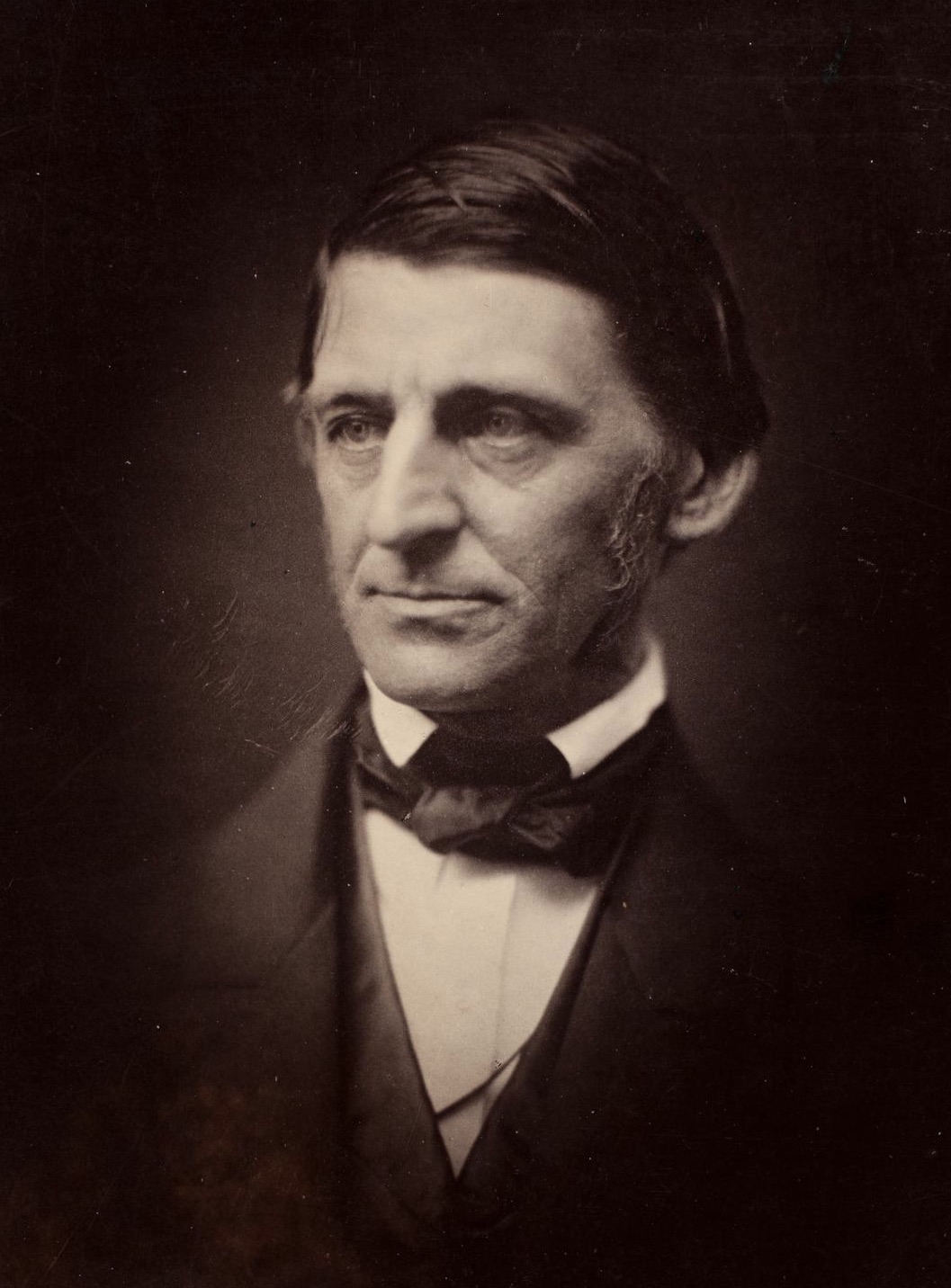
Ralph Waldo Emerson, whose 1837 poem "Concord Hymn" included the phrase.

The "shot heard round the world" is a phrase that refers to the opening shot of the Battles of Lexington and Concord on April 19, 1775, which sparked the American Revolutionary War and led to the creation of the United States. It originates from the opening stanza of Ralph Waldo Emerson's 1837 poem "Concord Hymn". The phrase has subsequently been applied to the assassination of Archduke Franz Ferdinand in 1914, a catalyst event for World War I, and hyperbolically applied to feats in sports.

== American Revolutionary War ==
By the rude bridge that arched the flood,
Their flag to April's breeze unfurled,
Here once the embattled farmers stood,
And fired the shot heard round the world.

— Emerson, "Concord Hymn"

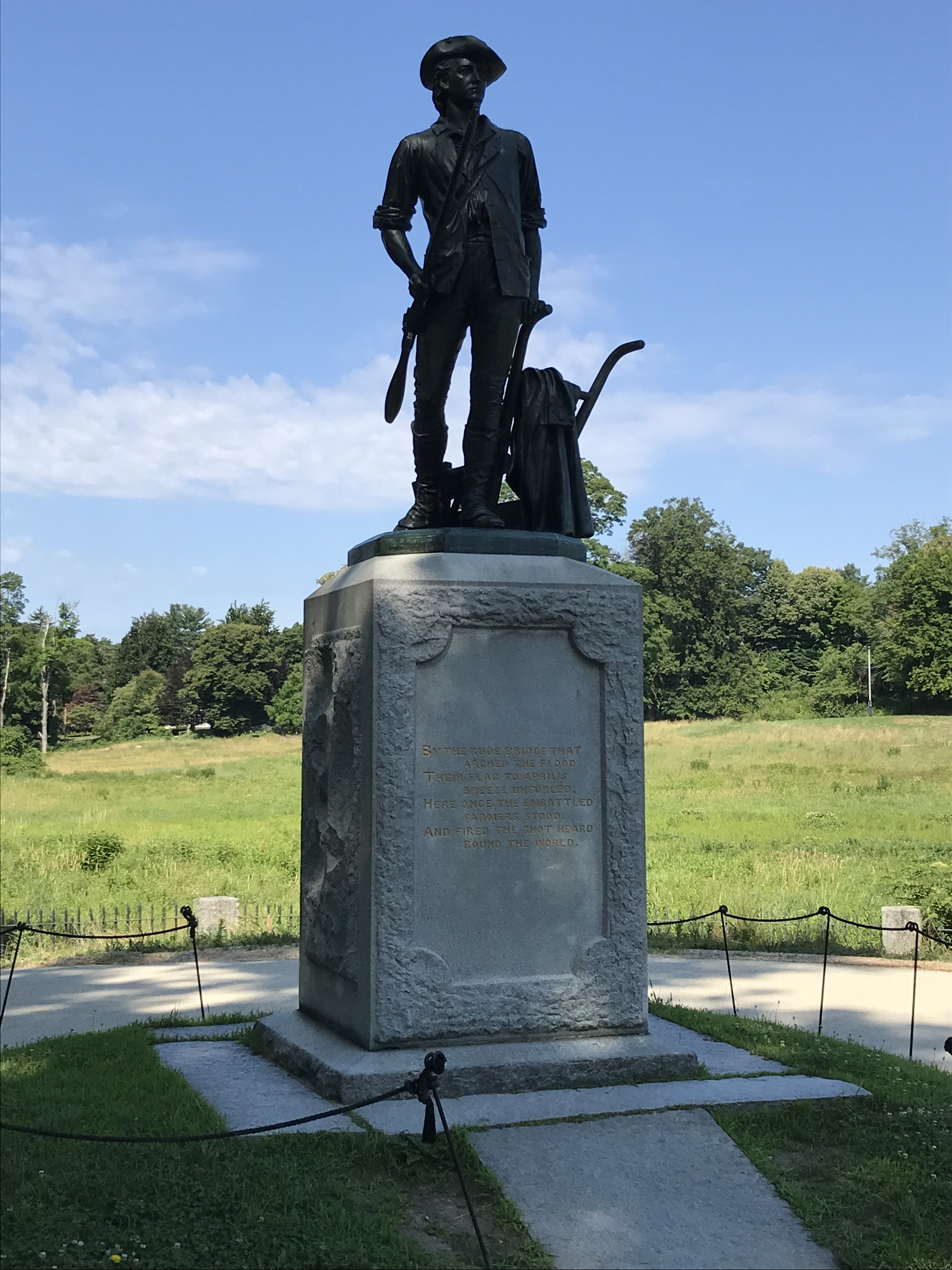
The opening stanza of "Concord Hymn" is inscribed at the base of The Minute Man statue by Daniel Chester French, located at the North Bridge in Concord, Massachusetts.

Emerson's "Concord Hymn", which originated the phrase, was written about the skirmish at the Old North Bridge, which was an early engagement on that day. Emerson lived in a house known as the Old Manse at the time when he was composing the poem, from which his grandfather and father (then a young child) had witnessed the skirmish. The house is located approximately 300 feet (91 m) from the Old North Bridge.

There is no consensus whether the shots fired at the North Bridge were truly the first shots of the American Revolution; it is an unprovable matter of contention, particularly between the towns of Concord and Lexington, Massachusetts. There had been an earlier encounter at the Lexington Battle Green, when a column of British troops encountered a group of minutemen led by Captain John Parker. Neither side had orders to open fire, but the British soldiers fired a spontaneous ragged volley anyway and then made a bayonet charge (whether the first shot was fired by a British soldier or an American sniper is unknown). Eight Americans were killed, the Americans quit the field, and the British continued their march toward Concord. One British soldier suffered a flesh wound from a shot from an unknown source.

Regardless of the facts of the matter, Emerson chose, in his poem, to characterize the later engagement at the North Bridge as the opening act of the Revolution. The North Bridge fight did see the first deliberate volley by Americans acting under orders, the first British deaths, and the first British retreat. A plaque on The Minute Man statue reads in part "On the 19 of April 1775 was made the first forcible resistance to British aggression..."

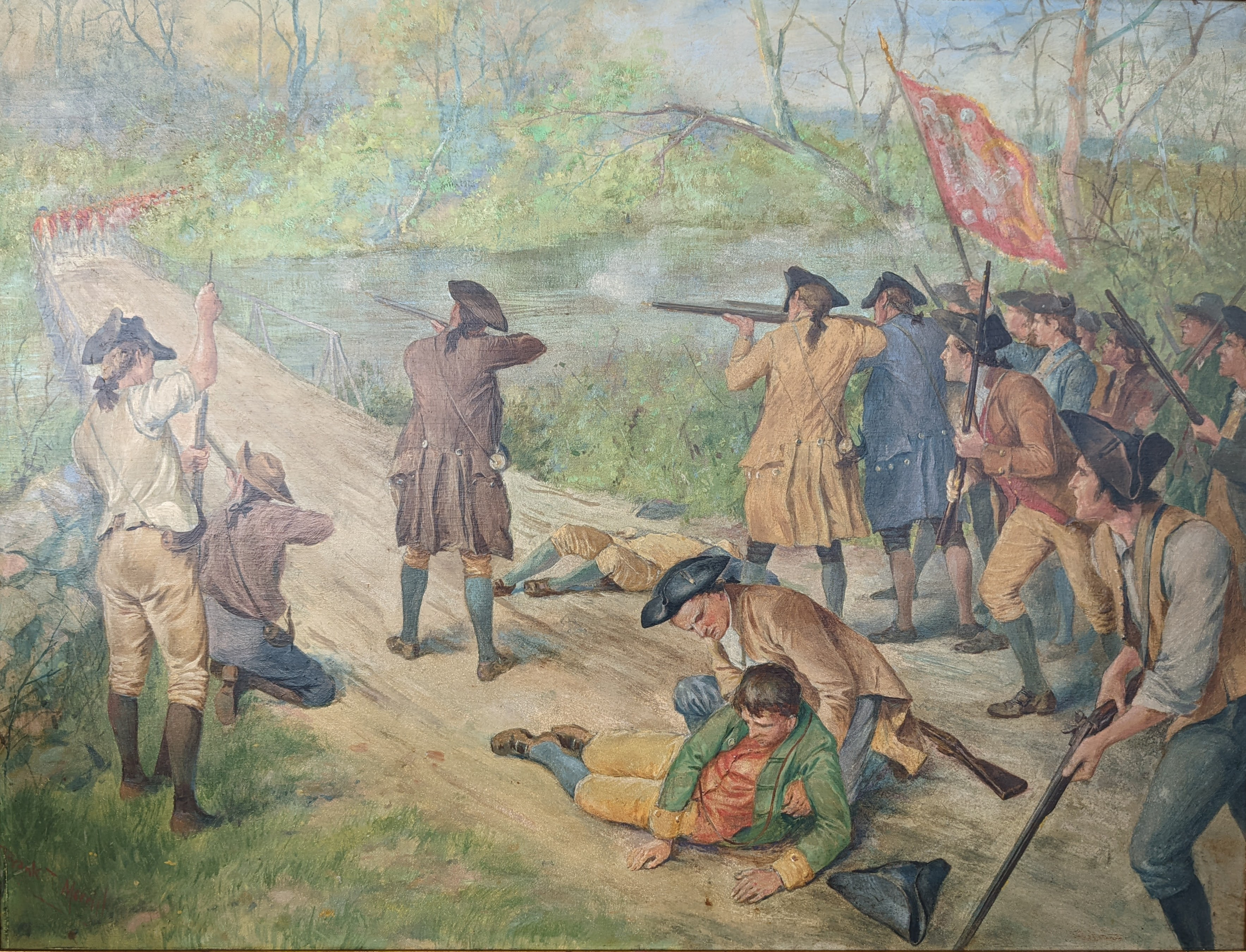
Artist's version of the fight at the North Bridge

The towns of Lexington and Concord have debated over the point where the first shot was fired since at least 1824, when Gilbert du Motier, Marquis de Lafayette visited the two towns during his visit to the United States. He was welcomed to Lexington by the municipal authorities, who described it as the "birthplace of American liberty"; the Marquis de Lafayette was subsequently informed in Concord that the "first forcible resistance" was made there. President Ulysses S. Grant considered not attending the 1875 centennial celebrations in the area to evade the issue. In 1894, Lexington petitioned the Massachusetts General Court to proclaim April 19 as "Lexington Day", to which Concord objected; the current name for the holiday is Patriots' Day.

== Assassination of Archduke Franz Ferdinand ==
Internationally, the phrase "shot heard round the world", alternatively written as "shots heard round the world" or "shot heard around the world", has become primarily associated with the assassination of Archduke Franz Ferdinand in Sarajevo on 28 June 1914. The event is considered to be one of the immediate causes of World War I. Serbian Gavrilo Princip fired two shots, the first hitting Franz Ferdinand's wife Sophie, Duchess of Hohenberg, and the second hitting the Archduke himself. The death of Franz Ferdinand, heir to the Austro-Hungarian throne, propelled Austria-Hungary and the rest of Europe into World War I.

== Widespread idiomatic use ==
The phrase "Shot heard round the world" continues to be a stock phrase in the 21st century, widely used to refer to extraordinary events in general. The phrase has been applied to several dramatic moments in sports history.

In baseball, the "Shot Heard 'Round the World" refers to the game-winning walk-off home run by New York Giants outfielder Bobby Thomson off Brooklyn Dodgers pitcher Ralph Branca to win the National League pennant on October 3, 1951. The Giants won the game 5–4 as a result of the home run, defeating their traditional rivals in the pennant playoff series, although they eventually lost the World Series to the Yankees.

In association football, the shot heard round the world refers to Paul Caligiuri's winning goal for the United States men's national soccer team in the final qualifying round for the 1990 FIFA World Cup on 19 November 1989. The US had not qualified for the World Cup since 1950. The team was in third position of the CONCACAF playoffs before their final game against Trinidad and Tobago in Port of Spain. The US had to win to go to the finals, their opponents only needed a draw. Defensive midfielder Caligiuri received the ball 40 yards out from goal, and instead of passing it to a striker, beat one defender and launched a 30-yard shot that looped into the goal.

In golf, the shot heard round the world refers to an albatross (or double eagle) made by Gene Sarazen on the 15th hole in the final round of the 1935 Masters. Sarazen would go on to win the tournament in a 36-hole playoff.
