= Amedei =

Italian chocolate company

Coordinates: 43.6539019°N 10.6816664°E

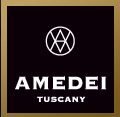
- Company type: Privately held company
- Industry: Chocolate production
- Founded: 1990
- Headquarters: Pontedera, Tuscany, Italy
- Area served: Worldwide
- Products: Chocolate
- Revenue: €3,344,797 (2013)
- Number of employees: 33
- Website: www.amedei.it (in Italian)

Amedei is a premium artisan chocolate manufacturing company located in Pontedera in the Tuscany region of Italy, considered to be one of the finest chocolate producers in the world.

Their products range from chocolate bars to truffles and pralines. Their award-winning chocolate bars use single-origin and single-variety cocoa beans. One of their products, Amedei Porcelana, is known as the world's most expensive chocolate. They obtain their cocoa from the Venezuelan region of Chuao. Amedei Porcelana was awarded Gold in the category Best Bean to Bar in 2005 and in 2006 by the Academy of Chocolate; although as this is an annual award, the Academy picks a new winning chocolate bar every year.

== See also ==
- List of bean-to-bar chocolate manufacturers
