= Chuao =

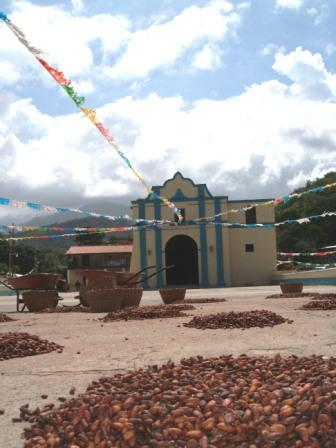

- Location within Venezuela
- Coordinates: 10°29′36″N 67°31′38″W
- Country: Venezuela
- State: Aragua
- Municipality: Santiago Mariño Municipality

Area
  - Total: 160 km^{2} (62 sq mi)
- Elevation: 254 m (833 ft)

Population (2011)
  - Total: 2,331
- Time zone: UTC−4 (VET)
- Climate: Aw

Chuao is a small village located in the northern coastal range mountains of Venezuela, founded in 1660. The village is famous for its cacao plantations, Diablos danzantes and San Juaneras. The village is surrounded by mountains and dense rainforests to the south and the Caribbean Sea to the north. The nearby Henri Pittier National Park is the oldest national park in Venezuela, created in 1937. The village is only accessible by travelling via boat from nearby Choroní, and is approximately 4 kilometers inland.

== Etymology ==
Chuao's name derives from an indigenous word from a local language which is related to the term water.

== History ==
While cocoa production in the site of Chuao can be traced back to 1591, the town itself was founded in 1660. From 1591 onwards, the area was home to a number of haciendas which grew cocoa. During colonial times, a number of slaves were imported to the village from Africa to increase cocoa production on said haciendas.

=== Operation Gideon ===
On May 3 and 4, 2020, Chuao was one of the sites of Operation Gideon, where a small group contracted by an American mercenary company Silvercorp USA headed by Jordan Goudreau allegedly attempted to invade Venezuela via sea to capture Nicolás Maduro and remove him from power. Upon landing in Chuao, the attackers, which included two Americans, were detained.

== Economy ==
The village of Chuao subsists largely on fishing and cocoa production.

=== Cocoa production ===
Chuao is home to a number of cocoa plantations, dating back to 1591, which grow Criollo and hybrid varieties of cacao. Chuao beans are regarded as being high in quality and, as a result, very expensive, fetching between 9 and 13 US dollars per kilogram. Beans from Chuao are considered some of Venezuela's finest, along with Porcelana Blanca beans from Lake Maracaibo. The Chuao region is hemmed in by mountains which reduces contact with people and insects from other areas. Some experts attribute the high quality of the cacao beans of Chuao due to the intense work of the village's laborers during the pre harvest, harvest and post harvest. Annually, Chuao's cocoa production hovers around 20 tons, but has varied from approximately 17 to 25 tons in recent years. In November 2000, the Chuao cacao beans were awarded an appellation of origin under the title Cacao de Chuao, allowing producers to negotiate higher prices and attract investment.

==== Empresa Campesina de Chuao ====
The Farmer's Company of Chuao (Spanish: Empresa Campesina de Chuao) is the worker's cooperative which operates the cocoa plantations of Chuao. The cooperative has 127 members, most of whom are female.

The cooperative has sold their beans to a number of foreign firms, such as Valrhona and Amedei, before forming an exclusive partnership with Tisano, a Venezuelan partner, in 2014. As of 2020 Chuao Trading has managed this partnership. The partnership sells 99% of its cocoa to foreign buyers. The sales outside of Venezuela work via exclusive and authorized cacao importers for the markets in US, Japan and Europe. Through this partnership, the association "Empresa Campesina de Chuao", alongside their partners Chuao Trading, Tachibana, Casa Franceschi and Silva Cacao, have implemented a Certificate of Authenticity for the chocolatiers to ensure that only the Chuao beans that were harvested in the Chuao village make it into chocolate bars that are marketed as Chuao origin. This traceability certificate assigns per sold volume and per harvest with a unique serial number to each chocolate maker.

The cooperative has benefitted largely from an increased global appetite for high-quality chocolate in recent years, which has helped its members earn a high standard of living. The worker's cooperative has been touted by the Venezuelan government as an "example of socialism". The cooperative has invested heavily in the village, building schools and medical infrastructure. However, The Guardian reported that those in Chuao who are not members of the association are discontent with the power it has over village life.

== Culture ==
Central Venezuela is home to a unique tradition regarding the Corpus Christi celebration, in which young men and children partake in Los Diablos Danzantes, which depicts masked devils surrendering to a church official. The dancers who partake in this festival become members of a lifelong pact, known as the promise-keepers, to transmit their history and traditions to others. In 2012, this tradition was added to the UNESCO Representative List of the Intangible Cultural Heritage of Humanity.

The first contemporary single-origin chocolate was made from cocoa beans from the Chuao Valley. This was popularized by Italian chocolate makers Amedei Chocolate, who had gained temporary exclusive use of beans from the region. Beans from the Chuao valley are particularly prized because of the limited crop, and because mineral deposits from the local river system give the beans a unique flavor, which is considered an example of terroir in chocolate.

The other column of the Chuao village are Las San Juaneras this is the group of ladies that take care of the beautiful church in the town square, and lead most religious celebrations especially the party of San Juan which is celebrated every year to thank San Juan for a good cacao harvest.

The church of the Immaculate Conception was built in 1772, replacing an old chapel. It was declared a National Monument according to Official Gazette No. 26,320 dated August 2, 1960. The exterior of the church is two-body with a mixed-linear pediment and a series of double pilasters flanking the main entrance with a semicircular arch. Simple cornices define and compose the façade. The interior has a presbytery and vestry along the end wall and a bell tower on the right side. The church still has valuable colonial religious images including one of Saint Nicholas of Bari in wood and canvas.

The Pardon Cross is situated on the left side of the church courtyard, which gives on to the Calle Real and the Plaza Bolivar. In the time of slavery, if a hunted slave managed to get to the cross and kneel before it, he could not be punished, and he was absolved of blame.

The House on the Hill dates from 1652. It was the administrator's house of the Hacienda. The principal facade is two stories high, with windows. The. upper floor is reached via the staircase on the right side. It has a simple, linear facade where the verandas have circular section columns with a Tuscan capital and base, and wooden pillars on the upper floor determine the building's original commercial use.

The Mamey Ruins is a stone construction located on El Mamey hill in natural surroundings. Its age and use goes back to the first years of the Colony, Most of the stone walls are still standing in an L-shape (50 m x 40 m).

The Chalk Oven is located on the road between the Mamey ruins and the Caribbean Sea. This is a circular stone structure with chalk mortar and two buttresses.

The Royal road leading from El Mamey to the beach is beautifully designed and perfectly preserved. Its characteristics and size indicate that the Mamey Ruins must have been very important.

The Chuao Plantation has a cultural landscape representative of the traditional way of exploiting cocoa, one of the most important products in the economic history of South America. This has been possible because of the plantation's almost in-sable location the fact that its production has been maintained for centuries by people with deep cultural roots, and the very special variety of the criollo-type cocoa considered among the best in the world and which is in danger of extinction.

Chuao's unique cultural landscape consists of the natural surroundings of the Henri Pittier National Park, the combination of the natural forest with the cocoa plantations, and the existence of ancient irrigation systems that make it possible to irrigate the plantation all year round. The Chuao Plantation is also a place of living culture where the native black people, descended from the slaves, have kept their traditions alive until our days. This culture is the result of the combination of their deep African roots with the Western world through the Catholic religion and today it is the oldest cultural manifestation in Venezuela. Chuao is above all a living culture, the symbiosis of African Caribbean rites and music and Catholic rites and beliefs.

== Gallery ==
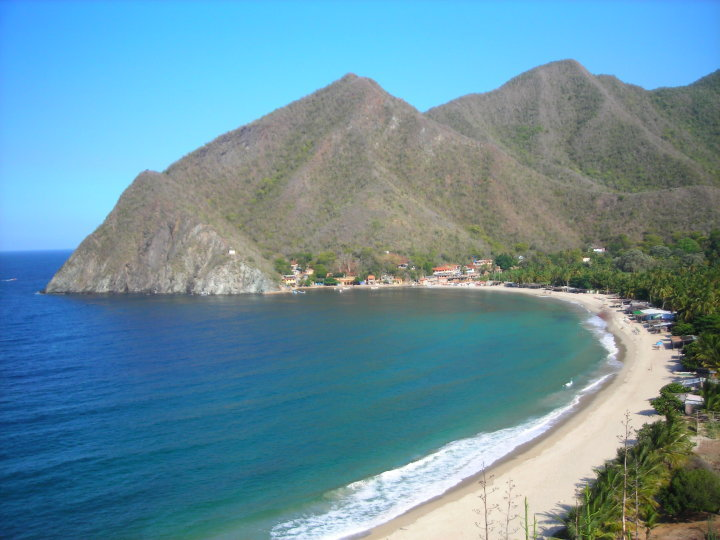
Chuao Bay

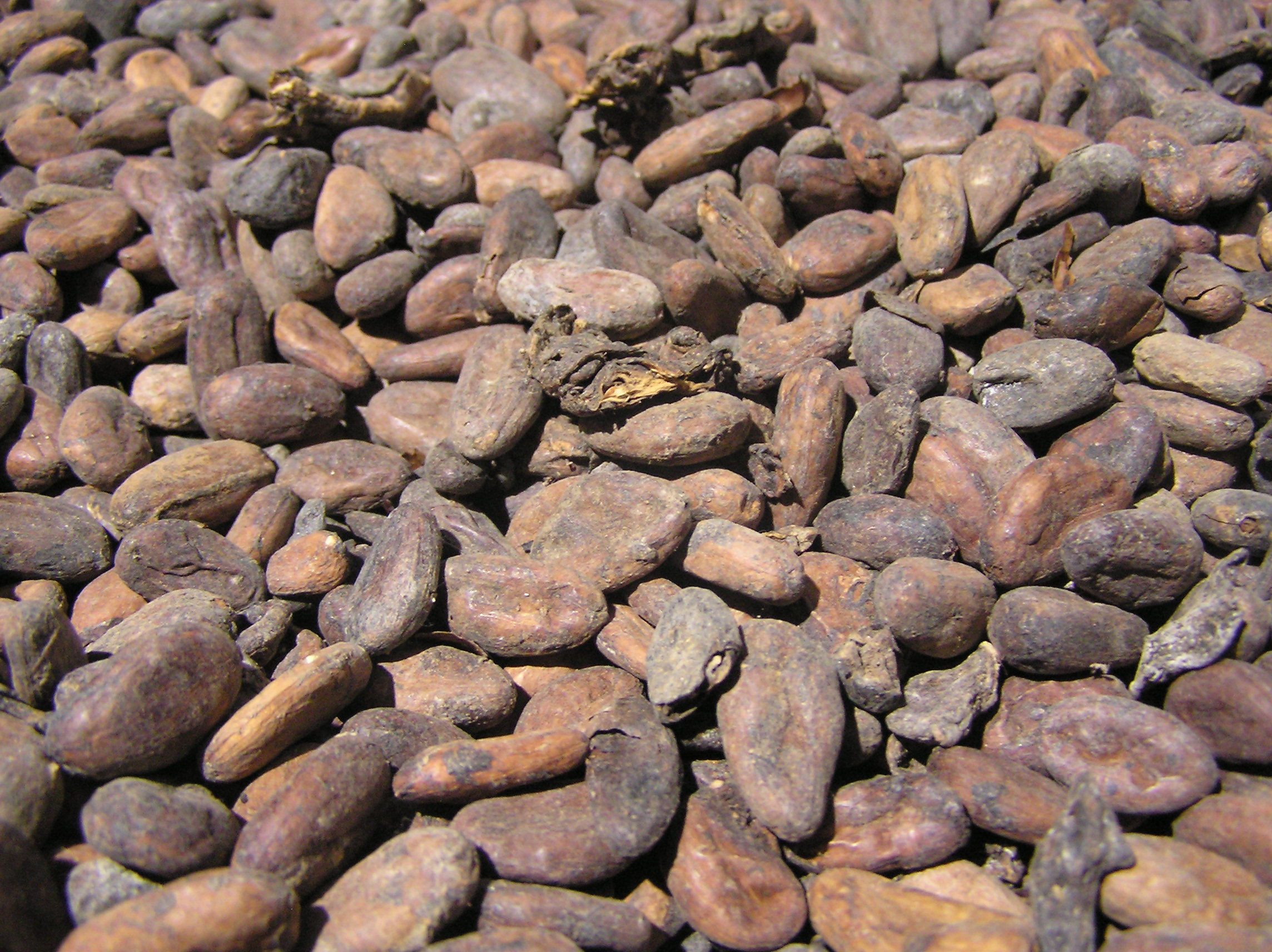
Cacao beans

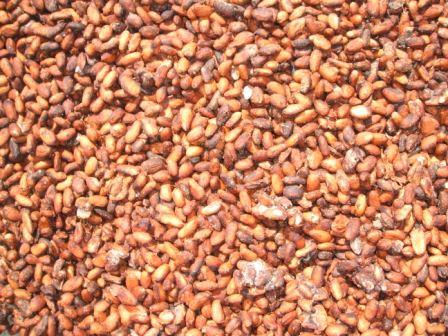
Chuao cocoa beans under the sun

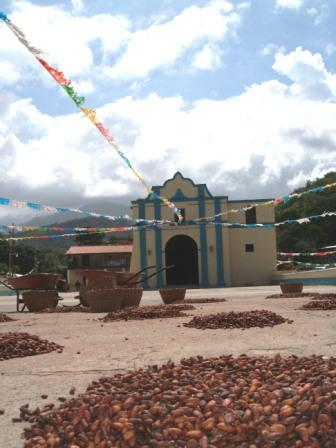
Plaza de Secado. The Church yard where the cocoa beans are sun dried.

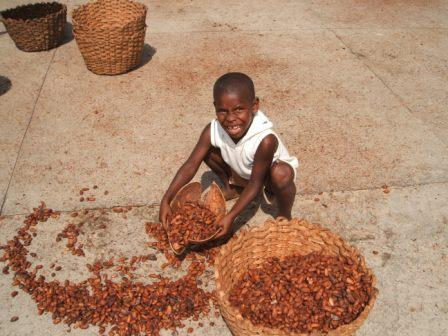
Plaza de Secado. Boy helping his mother to collect the cocoa beans. Chuao, Venezuela.

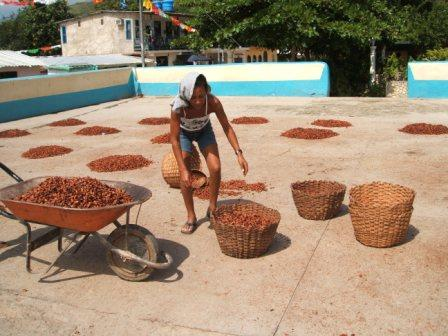
Plaza de Secado. The mother collecting the cocoa away from the sun. Chuao, Venezuela.

Cocoa in fermentation process

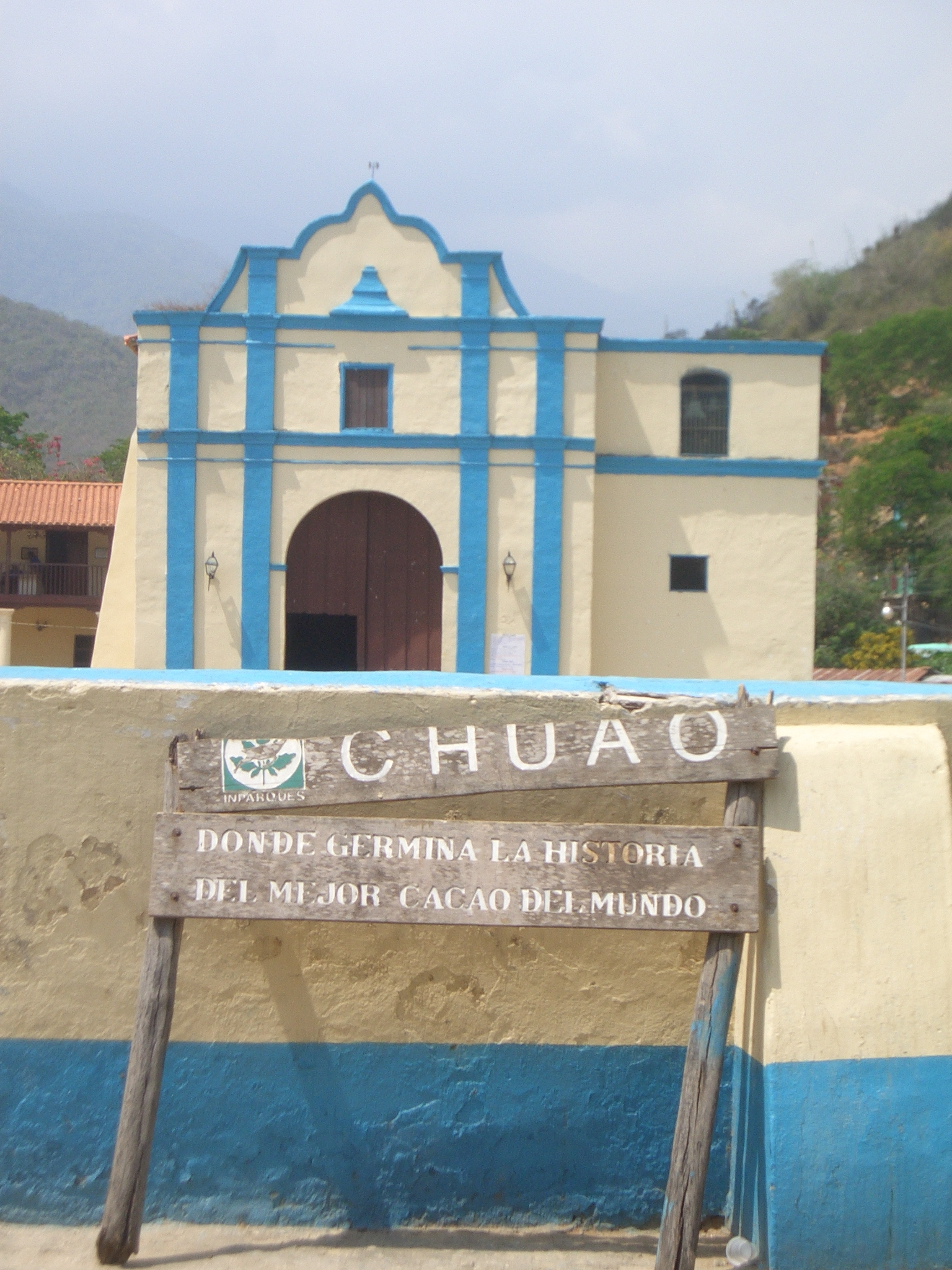
Chuao church

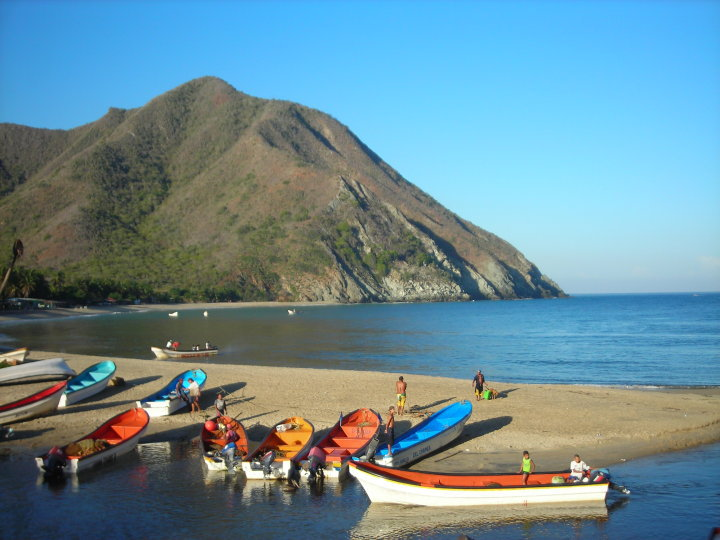
Chuao fishers' boats

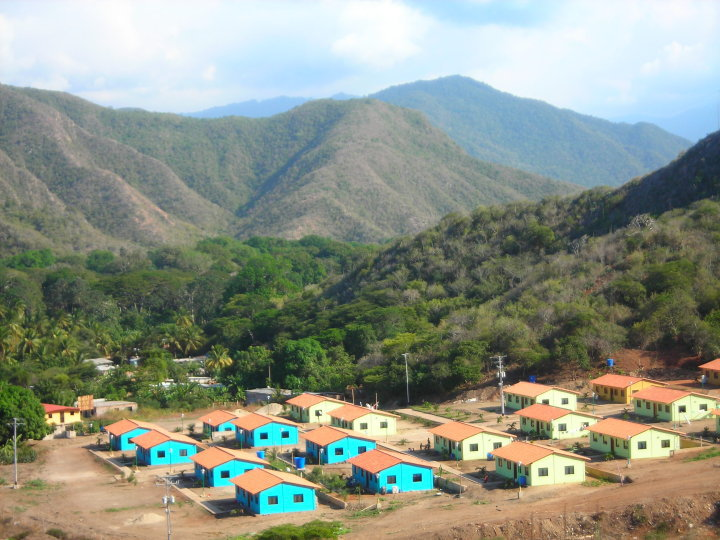
Chuao new town
