= 1953 Philadelphia Phillies season =

1953 Philadelphia Phillies
- League: National League
- Ballpark: Shibe Park
- City: Philadelphia
- Owners: R. R. M. Carpenter, Jr.
- General managers: R. R. M. Carpenter, Jr.
- Managers: Steve O'Neill
- Television: WPTZ; WCAU; WFIL
- Radio: WIBG (Gene Kelly, George Walsh)

The 1953 Philadelphia Phillies season was the 71st in franchise history. They tied with the St. Louis Cardinals for third place in the National League with an 83–71 win–loss record.

== Regular season ==
=== Season standings ===
National League
Team	W	L	Pct.	GB	Home	Road
Brooklyn Dodgers	105	49	.682	—	60‍–‍17	45‍–‍32
Milwaukee Braves	92	62	.597	13	45‍–‍31	47‍–‍31
Philadelphia Phillies	83	71	.539	22	48‍–‍29	35‍–‍42
St. Louis Cardinals	83	71	.539	22	48‍–‍30	35‍–‍41
New York Giants	70	84	.455	35	38‍–‍39	32‍–‍45
Cincinnati Redlegs	68	86	.442	37	38‍–‍39	30‍–‍47
Chicago Cubs	65	89	.422	40	43‍–‍34	22‍–‍55
Pittsburgh Pirates	50	104	.325	55	26‍–‍51	24‍–‍53

=== Record vs. opponents ===
1953 National League record Sources:
Team	BRO	CHC	CIN	MIL	NYG	PHI	PIT	STL
Brooklyn	—	13–9–1	15–7	13–9	15–7	14–8	20–2	15–7
Chicago	9–13–1	—	12–10	8–14	9–13	5–17	11–11	11–11
Cincinnati	7–15	10–12	—	8–14	9–13	12–10	15–7	7–15–1
Milwaukee	9–13	14–8	14–8	—	14–8–1	13–9–1	15–7	13–9–1
New York	7–15	13–9	13–9	8–14–1	—	9–13	11–11	9–13
Philadelphia	8–14	17–5	10–12	9–13–1	13–9	—	15–7	11–11–1
Pittsburgh	2–20	11–11	7–15	7–15	11–11	7–15	—	5–17
St. Louis	7–15	11–11	15–7–1	9–13–1	13–9	11–11–1	17–5	—

=== Game log ===
Legend
	Phillies win
	Phillies loss
	Phillies tie
	Postponement
**Bold**	Phillies team member

1953 Game Log
Overall Record: 83–71–2
April (9–4–1)

#	Date	Opponent	Score	Win	Loss	Save	Attendance	Record
1	April 14	Giants	1–4	Larry Jansen (1–0)	**Robin Roberts** (0–1)	None	1,922	0–1
2	April 15	Giants	8–1	**Curt Simmons** (1–0)	Al Corwin (0–1)	None	4,787	1–1
3	April 16	@ Pirates	12–14	Murry Dickson (1–1)	**Andy Hansen** (0–1)	None	16,220	1–2
–	April 17	@ Pirates	Postponed (rain and cold, cold weather); Makeup: May 21					
–	April 18	@ Pirates	Postponed (snow, cold); Makeup: May 27 as a traditional double-header					
–	April 19	@ Giants	Postponed (cold); Makeup: July 7 as a traditional double-header					
4	April 20	@ Giants	2–1	**Robin Roberts** (1–1)	Larry Jansen (1–1)	None	2,538	2–2
5	April 21	Dodgers	7–1	**Curt Simmons** (2–0)	Russ Meyer (1–1)	None	14,309	3–2
6	April 22	Dodgers	5–4	**Karl Drews** (1–0)	Billy Loes (1–1)	None	15,984	4–2
7	April 23	Dodgers	6–1	**Robin Roberts** (2–1)	Johnny Podres (0–2)	None	25,508	5–2
8	April 24	Pirates	5–3	**Jim Konstanty** (1–0)	Bob Hall (0–1)	None	6,506	6–2
9	April 25	Pirates	7–6	**Curt Simmons** (3–0)	Johnny Lindell (0–2)	**Andy Hansen** (1)	6,265	7–2
10	April 26 (1)	Pirates	7–5	**Robin Roberts** (3–1)	Bob Friend (1–1)	None	see 2nd game	8–2
11	April 26 (2)	Pirates	8–1	**Karl Drews** (2–0)	Bill Macdonald (0–1)	None	18,490	9–2
12	April 28	Cardinals	5–6	Harvey Haddix (2–1)	**Jim Konstanty** (1–1)	Gerry Staley (1)	12,281	9–3
13	April 29	Cardinals	0–1 (11)	Al Brazle (1–1)	**Curt Simmons** (3–1)	None	16,321	9–4
14	April 30	Cardinals	1–1 (5)	None	None	None	12,870	9–4–1

May (11–10)

#	Date	Opponent	Score	Win	Loss	Save	Attendance	Record
15	May 1	Braves	2–5	Jim Wilson (1–0)	**Karl Drews** (2–1)	None	9,472	9–5–1
–	May 2	Braves	Postponed (rain); Makeup: July 21 as a traditional double-header					
16	May 3 (1)	Cubs	5–1	**Robin Roberts** (4–1)	Bob Rush (2–2)	None	see 2nd game	10–5–1
17	May 3 (2)	Cubs	2–0	**Curt Simmons** (4–1)	Warren Hacker (1–3)	None	15,300	11–5–1
18	May 4	Cubs	8–4	**Jim Konstanty** (2–1)	Johnny Klippstein (1–1)	None	8,526	12–5–1
–	May 5	Cubs	Postponed (rain); Makeup: June 10 as a traditional double-header					
–	May 6	Redlegs	Postponed (rain); Makeup: July 16 as a traditional double-header					
–	May 7	Redlegs	Postponed (rain, wet grounds); Makeup: August 31 (Game 1) as a traditional double-header					
–	May 8	@ Dodgers	Postponed (rain); Makeup: May 9 as a double-header					
19	May 9 (1)	@ Dodgers	6–7	Ben Wade (2–0)	**Robin Roberts** (4–2)	None	19,257	12–6–1
20	May 9 (2)	@ Dodgers	8–4	**Curt Simmons** (5–1)	Joe Black (2–2)	None	25,025	13–6–1
21	May 10	@ Dodgers	0–5	Billy Loes (4–1)	**Karl Drews** (2–2)	None	23,843	13–7–1
22	May 12	@ Cardinals	6–5	**Jim Konstanty** (3–1)	Joe Presko (1–2)	**Andy Hansen** (2)	9,247	14–7–1
–	May 13	@ Cardinals	Postponed (rain, cold, cold and wet grounds); Makeup: June 27 as a double-header					
–	May 14	@ Cubs	Postponed (cold weather); Makeup: August 9 as a traditional double-header					
23	May 15	@ Cubs	1–0	**Robin Roberts** (5–2)	Warren Hacker (1–5)	None	6,531	15–7–1
24	May 16	@ Braves	3–0	**Curt Simmons** (6–1)	Don Liddle (1–1)	None	23,578	16–7–1
–	May 17 (1)	@ Braves	Postponed (rain); Makeup: June 16 as a traditional double-header					
–	May 17 (2)	@ Braves	Postponed (rain); Makeup: May 18					
25	May 18	@ Braves	0–4	Bob Buhl (2–1)	**Karl Drews** (2–3)	None	22,237	16–8–1
26	May 19	@ Redlegs	6–3	**Robin Roberts** (6–2)	Harry Perkowski (1–3)	None	8,561	17–8–1
27	May 20	@ Redlegs	5–14	Joe Nuxhall (1–0)	**Curt Simmons** (6–2)	None	2,890	17–9–1
28	May 21	@ Pirates	2–7	Murry Dickson (4–4)	**Karl Drews** (2–4)	None	7,507	17–10–1
29	May 23	Dodgers	0–2	Preacher Roe (2–2)	**Robin Roberts** (6–3)	None	31,532	17–11–1
30	May 24	Dodgers	2–16	Johnny Podres (1–2)	**Curt Simmons** (6–3)	Carl Erskine (1)	24,715	17–12–1
31	May 25	Dodgers	9–11	Bob Milliken (1–0)	**Jim Konstanty** (3–2)	Joe Black (2)	22,067	17–13–1
32	May 27 (1)	@ Pirates	14–2	**Robin Roberts** (7–3)	Murry Dickson (4–5)	None	see 2nd game	18–13–1
33	May 27 (2)	@ Pirates	6–8	Roy Face (2–0)	**Karl Drews** (2–5)	Murry Dickson (2)	16,935	18–14–1
34	May 28	@ Pirates	9–8	**Jim Konstanty** (4–2)	Paul LaPalme (2–4)	None	2,437	19–14–1
35	May 29	@ Giants	12–3	**Curt Simmons** (7–3)	Larry Jansen (4–4)	None	6,253	20–14–1
–	May 30 (1)	@ Giants	Postponed (rain); Makeup: August 15 as a traditional double-header					
–	May 30 (2)	@ Giants	Postponed (rain); Makeup: August 16 as a traditional double-header					
–	May 31	Giants	Postponed (wet grounds); Makeup: August 22 as a traditional double-header					

June (17–13)

#	Date	Opponent	Score	Win	Loss	Save	Attendance	Record
36	June 2	Cardinals	5–0	**Robin Roberts** (8–3)	Cliff Chambers (0–3)	None	15,064	21–14–1
37	June 3 (1)	Cardinals	3–5	Vinegar Bend Mizell (5–2)	**Curt Simmons** (7–4)	Al Brazle (8)	see 2nd game	21–15–1
38	June 3 (2)	Cardinals	6–5	**Steve Ridzik** (1–0)	Al Brazle (2–3)	**Andy Hansen** (3)	31,104	22–15–1
39	June 4	Cardinals	6–5 (10)	**Steve Ridzik** (2–0)	Hal White (0–1)	None	8,994	23–15–1
40	June 5	Braves	2–3 (10)	Warren Spahn (6–1)	**Jim Konstanty** (4–3)	None	16,025	23–16–1
41	June 6	Braves	6–2	**Robin Roberts** (9–3)	Jim Wilson (2–3)	None	9,144	24–16–1
42	June 7 (1)	Braves	0–6	Johnny Antonelli (6–1)	**Steve Ridzik** (2–1)	None	see 2nd game	24–17–1
43	June 7 (2)	Braves	3–5	Bob Buhl (4–2)	**Thornton Kipper** (0–1)	Lew Burdette (4)	20,098	24–18–1
44	June 8	Cubs	7–3	**Steve Ridzik** (3–1)	Paul Minner (2–6)	None	2,851	25–18–1
45	June 9	Cubs	10–9	**Thornton Kipper** (1–1)	Dutch Leonard (1–2)	None	6,903	26–18–1
46	June 10 (1)	Cubs	9–1	**Robin Roberts** (10–3)	Johnny Klippstein (4–5)	None	see 2nd game	27–18–1
47	June 10 (2)	Cubs	8–5	**Jim Konstanty** (5–3)	Warren Hacker (2–10)	**Karl Drews** (1)	15,000	28–18–1
48	June 12	Redlegs	1–4	Jackie Collum (1–1)	**Thornton Kipper** (1–2)	None	6,510	28–19–1
–	June 13	Redlegs	Postponed (rain); Makeup: August 31 (Game 2) as a traditional double-header					
49	June 14 (1)	Redlegs	1–2	Ken Raffensberger (2–6)	**Robin Roberts** (10–4)	None	see 2nd game	28–20–1
50	June 14 (2)	Redlegs	4–1	**Karl Drews** (3–5)	Joe Nuxhall (3–3)	**Bob Miller** (1)	9,391	29–20–1
51	June 16 (1)	@ Braves	5–6 (10)	Lew Burdette (6–0)	**Kent Peterson** (0–1)	None	see 2nd game	29–21–1
52	June 16 (2)	@ Braves	2–3	Max Surkont (9–1)	**Jim Konstanty** (5–4)	None	33,962	29–22–1
53	June 17	@ Braves	6–9	Warren Spahn (8–1)	**Bob Miller** (0–1)	Lew Burdette (6)	32,771	29–23–1
–	June 18	@ Braves	Postponed (rain); Makeup: July 31 as a traditional double-header					
54	June 19	@ Redlegs	10–3	**Robin Roberts** (11–4)	Ken Raffensberger (2–7)	None	10,780	30–23–1
55	June 20	@ Redlegs	3–1	**Karl Drews** (4–5)	Joe Nuxhall (3–4)	**Bob Miller** (2)	4,043	31–23–1
56	June 21 (1)	@ Redlegs	5–2	**Jim Konstanty** (6–4)	Harry Perkowski (1–6)	None	see 2nd game	32–23–1
57	June 21 (2)	@ Redlegs	3–5	Fred Baczewski (1–0)	**Steve Ridzik** (3–2)	None	14,992	32–24–1
58	June 23	@ Cubs	6–1	**Robin Roberts** (12–4)	Bob Rush (4–7)	None	7,919	33–24–1
59	June 24	@ Cubs	8–2	**Karl Drews** (5–5)	Paul Minner (3–8)	None	7,220	34–24–1
60	June 25	@ Cubs	13–2	**Jim Konstanty** (7–4)	Howie Pollet (2–3)	None	6,135	35–24–1
61	June 26	@ Cardinals	0–7	Stu Miller (2–3)	**Steve Ridzik** (3–3)	None	11,317	35–25–1
62	June 27 (1)	@ Cardinals	4–7	Gerry Staley (11–2)	**Robin Roberts** (12–5)	None	7,407	35–26–1
63	June 27 (2)	@ Cardinals	3–4	Harvey Haddix (10–3)	**Bob Miller** (0–2)	None	17,075	35–27–1
64	June 28	@ Cardinals	4–3 (11)	**Jim Konstanty** (8–4)	Hal White (1–2)	None	17,710	36–27–1
65	June 30	@ Dodgers	10–9 (10)	**Jim Konstanty** (9–4)	Joe Black (5–3)	**Karl Drews** (2)	23,956	37–27–1

July (17–15–1)

#	Date	Opponent	Score	Win	Loss	Save	Attendance	Record
66	July 1	@ Dodgers	4–5 (10)	Johnny Podres (3–2)	**Robin Roberts** (12–6)	None	19,376	37–28–1
67	July 2	@ Dodgers	0–8	Carl Erskine (6–4)	**Karl Drews** (5–6)	None	9,223	37–29–1
68	July 3	Giants	5–1	**Jim Konstanty** (10–4)	Larry Jansen (7–7)	None	4,499	38–29–1
69	July 4 (1)	Giants	2–4	Rubén Gómez (5–4)	**Curt Simmons** (7–5)	Hoyt Wilhelm (14)	see 2nd game	38–30–1
70	July 4 (2)	Giants	10–4	**Thornton Kipper** (2–2)	Jim Hearn (6–5)	None	23,664	39–30–1
71	July 5 (1)	@ Pirates	2–0 (10)	**Robin Roberts** (13–6)	Murry Dickson (7–9)	None	see 2nd game	40–30–1
72	July 5 (2)	@ Pirates	4–7^{^{[a]}}	Jim Waugh (1–0)	**Steve Ridzik** (3–4)	Paul LaPalme (1)	11,404	40–31–1
73	July 6	@ Giants	0–6	Al Worthington (1–0)	**Bob Miller** (0–3)	None	6,650	40–32–1
74	July 7 (1)	@ Giants	3–5	Marv Grissom (3–6)	**Jim Konstanty** (10–5)	Hoyt Wilhelm (15)	see 2nd game	40–33–1
75	July 7 (2)	@ Giants	1–9	Al Corwin (5–2)	**Thornton Kipper** (2–3)	None	34,736	40–34–1
76	July 8	Dodgers	4–8	Billy Loes (11–5)	**Karl Drews** (5–7)	None	22,601	40–35–1
77	July 9	Dodgers	6–5	**Bob Miller** (1–3)	Jim Hughes (2–2)	**Jim Konstanty** (1)	21,989	41–35–1
78	July 10	Pirates	13–3	**Curt Simmons** (8–5)	Murry Dickson (7–10)	None	6,466	42–35–1
79	July 11	Pirates	8–4	**Steve Ridzik** (4–4)	Murry Dickson (7–11)	None	3,608	43–35–1
80	July 12 (1)	Pirates	6–4	**Robin Roberts** (14–6)	Roy Face (3–3)	None	see 2nd game	44–35–1
81	July 12 (2)	Pirates	6–5	**Steve Ridzik** (5–4)	Paul LaPalme (3–10)	None	10,806	45–35–1
–	July 14	**1953 Major League Baseball All-Star Game at Crosley Field in Cincinnati**						
82	July 16 (1)	Redlegs	3–1	**Robin Roberts** (15–6)	Bud Podbielan (5–9)	None	see 2nd game	46–35–1
83	July 16 (2)	Redlegs	3–2	**Bob Miller** (2–3)	Ken Raffensberger (5–8)	None	19,834	47–35–1
84	July 17	Redlegs	2–3	Harry Perkowski (7–7)	**Curt Simmons** (8–6)	Clyde King (2)	6,013	47–36–1
85	July 18	Redlegs	0–11	Jackie Collum (3–4)	**Jim Konstanty** (10–6)	None	3,201	47–37–1
86	July 19 (1)	Cubs	3–5	Paul Minner (6–10)	**Karl Drews** (5–8)	Howie Pollet (1)	see 2nd game	47–38–1
87	July 19 (2)	Cubs	6–5	**Thornton Kipper** (3–3)	Johnny Klippstein (5–8)	None	8,689	48–38–1
88	July 21 (1)	Braves	10–0	**Robin Roberts** (16–6)	Bob Buhl (6–5)	None	see 2nd game	49–38–1
89	July 21 (2)	Braves	3–7	Johnny Antonelli (9–5)	**Curt Simmons** (8–7)	None	35,174	49–39–1
90	July 22	Braves	6–3	**Jim Konstanty** (11–6)	Warren Spahn (12–4)	**Karl Drews** (3)	12,756	50–39–1
–	July 23	Braves	Postponed (rain, wet grounds); Makeup: August 25 as a traditional double-header					
91	July 24	Cardinals	2–1	**Bob Miller** (3–3)	Harvey Haddix (11–4)	None	15,953	51–39–1
92	July 25	Cardinals	3–0	**Robin Roberts** (17–6)	Vinegar Bend Mizell (8–6)	None	27,003	52–39–1
93	July 26	Cardinals	6–8	Al Brazle (4–4)	**Curt Simmons** (8–8)	None	14,436	52–40–1
94	July 28	@ Redlegs	4–5	Harry Perkowski (9–7)	**Bob Miller** (3–4)	None	15,533	52–41–1
95	July 29	@ Redlegs	4–13	Jackie Collum (4–5)	**Robin Roberts** (17–7)	None	13,282	52–42–1
96	July 30	@ Redlegs	17–8	**Steve Ridzik** (6–4)	Frank Smith (5–1)	None	2,773	53–42–1
97	July 31 (1)	@ Braves	5–1	**Robin Roberts** (18–7)	Johnny Antonelli (9–7)	None	see 2nd game	54–42–1
98	July 31 (2)	@ Braves	0–0 (12)	None	None	None	29,802	54–42–2

August (19–17)

#	Date	Opponent	Score	Win	Loss	Save	Attendance	Record
99	August 1	@ Braves	0–5	Warren Spahn (14–4)	**Jim Konstanty** (11–7)	None	23,791	54–43–2
100	August 2 (1)	@ Braves	4–1	**Curt Simmons** (9–8)	Don Liddle (4–4)	None	see 2nd game	55–43–2
101	August 2 (2)	@ Braves	1–6	Bob Buhl (8–5)	**Steve Ridzik** (6–5)	None	31,300	55–44–2
102	August 3	@ Cardinals	3–8	Vinegar Bend Mizell (9–6)	**Jim Konstanty** (11–8)	Al Brazle (11)	11,580	55–45–2
103	August 4	@ Cardinals	8–1	**Robin Roberts** (19–7)	Gerry Staley (13–6)	None	12,636	56–45–2
104	August 5	@ Cardinals	7–3	**Bob Miller** (4–4)	Willard Schmidt (0–1)	None	6,538	57–45–2
105	August 6	@ Cardinals	0–2	Harvey Haddix (14–4)	**Curt Simmons** (9–9)	None	9,073	57–46–2
106	August 7	@ Cubs	5–4	**Steve Ridzik** (7–5)	Paul Minner (7–12)	**Jim Konstanty** (2)	4,499	58–46–2
107	August 8	@ Cubs	1–4	Howie Pollet (4–4)	**Robin Roberts** (19–8)	None	12,636	58–47–2
108	August 9 (1)	@ Cubs	7–0	**Bob Miller** (5–4)	Bob Rush (6–10)	None	see 2nd game	59–47–2
109	August 9 (2)	@ Cubs	5–6	Johnny Klippstein (7–9)	**Jim Konstanty** (11–9)	None	22,088	59–48–2
110	August 11	@ Pirates	3–0	**Curt Simmons** (10–9)	Murry Dickson (8–16)	None	8,985	60–48–2
111	August 12	@ Pirates	8–4	**Robin Roberts** (20–8)	Johnny Lindell (5–13)	None	6,505	61–48–2
112	August 13	@ Pirates	3–4	Paul LaPalme (6–13)	**Bob Miller** (5–5)	None	2,373	61–49–2
–	August 14	@ Giants	Postponed (rain, Hurricane Barbara); Makeup: August 17 as a traditional double-header					
113	August 15 (1)	@ Giants	1–4	Marv Grissom (4–7)	**Curt Simmons** (10–10)	None	see 2nd game	61–50–2
114	August 15 (2)	@ Giants	5–2	**Jim Konstanty** (12–9)	Larry Jansen (10–10)	None	9,873	62–50–2
115	August 16 (1)	@ Giants	1–8	Jim Hearn (7–7)	**Robin Roberts** (20–9)	None	see 2nd game	62–51–2
116	August 16 (2)	@ Giants	3–4	Rubén Gómez (10–6)	**Karl Drews** (5–9)	None	16,926	62–52–2
117	August 17 (1)	@ Giants	5–2	**Bob Miller** (6–5)	Dave Koslo (3–10)	**Jim Konstanty** (3)	see 2nd game	63–52–2
118	August 17 (2)	@ Giants	0–6	Al Corwin (6–2)	**Andy Hansen** (0–2)	None	2,885	63–53–2
119	August 18	Pirates	1–0	**Steve Ridzik** (8–5)	Paul LaPalme (6–14)	**Robin Roberts** (1)	3,945	64–53–2
120	August 19	Pirates	3–5	Roy Face (6–5)	**Curt Simmons** (10–11)	None	4,554	64–54–2
121	August 20	Pirates	2–5	Jim Waugh (3–3)	**Robin Roberts** (20–10)	None	4,376	64–55–2
122	August 21	Giants	7–6	**Steve Ridzik** (9–5)	Dave Koslo (3–11)	**Jim Konstanty** (4)	15,925	65–55–2
123	August 22 (1)	Giants	7–1	**Karl Drews** (6–9)	Sal Maglie (8–9)	None	see 2nd game	66–55–2
124	August 22 (2)	Giants	6–5	**Jim Konstanty** (13–9)	Al Worthington (2–5)	**Robin Roberts** (2)	22,554	67–55–2
125	August 23	Giants	6–3	**Curt Simmons** (11–11)	Larry Jansen (10–11)	None	12,929	68–55–2
126	August 25 (1)	Braves	6–1	**Robin Roberts** (21–10)	Johnny Antonelli (10–9)	None	see 2nd game	69–55–2
127	August 25 (2)	Braves	2–6	Lew Burdette (13–2)	**Bob Miller** (6–6)	None	31,596	69–56–2
128	August 26	Braves	6–5	**Karl Drews** (7–9)	Bob Buhl (10–7)	**Jim Konstanty** (5)	13,918	70–56–2
129	August 28	Cubs	5–0	**Curt Simmons** (12–11)	Howie Pollet (4–7)	None	5,956	71–56–2
130	August 29	Cubs	0–2	Paul Minner (9–14)	**Robin Roberts** (21–11)	None	5,156	71–57–2
131	August 30 (1)	Redlegs	4–2	**Karl Drews** (8–9)	Jackie Collum (7–9)	None	see 2nd game	72–57–2
132	August 30 (2)	Redlegs	4–3	**Jim Konstanty** (14–9)	Ken Raffensberger (7–12)	None	9,422	73–57–2
133	August 31 (1)	Redlegs	6–12	Joe Nuxhall (7–9)	**Bob Miller** (6–7)	Fred Baczewski (1)	see 2nd game	73–58–2
134	August 31 (2)	Redlegs	5–7	Harry Perkowski (11–9)	**Jim Konstanty** (14–10)	None	9,490	73–59–2

September (10–12)

#	Date	Opponent	Score	Win	Loss	Save	Attendance	Record
135	September 2	Cardinals	7–10	Hal White (5–5)	**Robin Roberts** (21–12)	Al Brazle (14)	11,964	73–60–2
136	September 3	Cardinals	2–1	**Curt Simmons** (13–11)	Harvey Haddix (16–8)	None	8,154	74–60–2
137	September 6	@ Pirates	7–2	**Karl Drews** (9–9)	Roy Face (6–6)	None	5,890	75–60–2
138	September 7 (1)	@ Dodgers	2–6	Carl Erskine (18–6)	**Robin Roberts** (21–13)	None	see 2nd game	75–61–2
139	September 7 (2)	@ Dodgers	2–6	Billy Loes (13–7)	**Curt Simmons** (13–12)	None	33,337	75–62–2
140	September 8	@ Braves	2–3	Johnny Antonelli (12–10)	**Johnny Lindell** (5–17)	None	28,629	75–63–2
141	September 9	@ Braves	2–0	**Bob Miller** (7–7)	Warren Spahn (19–7)	None	31,049	76–63–2
142	September 11	@ Redlegs	5–6	Harry Perkowski (12–9)	**Robin Roberts** (21–14)	Frank Smith (2)	4,737	76–64–2
143	September 12	@ Redlegs	2–3	Joe Nuxhall (8–10)	**Karl Drews** (9–10)	None	2,190	76–65–2
144	September 13	@ Cardinals	3–17	Harvey Haddix (18–8)	**Curt Simmons** (13–13)	None	11,841	76–66–2
145	September 14	@ Cardinals	6–5	**Johnny Lindell** (6–17)	Vinegar Bend Mizell (13–9)	None	5,214	77–66–2
146	September 15	@ Cubs	4–2	**Robin Roberts** (22–14)	Paul Minner (10–15)	None	3,185	78–66–2
147	September 16	@ Cubs	4–7	Howie Pollet (6–7)	**Bob Miller** (7–8)	Bubba Church (1)	3,448	78–67–2
148	September 17	@ Cubs	16–4	**Curt Simmons** (14–13)	Don Elston (0–1)	None	2,793	79–67–2
149	September 19	@ Dodgers	4–5	Russ Meyer (15–5)	**Robin Roberts** (22–15)	None	9,057	79–68–2
150	September 20 (1)	@ Dodgers	4–5	Ben Wade (7–5)	**Steve Ridzik** (9–6)	None	see 2nd game	79–69–2
151	September 20 (2)^{^{[b]}}	@ Dodgers	2–1 (5)	**Bob Miller** (8–8)	Billy Loes (13–8)	None	23,558	80–69–2
152	September 22	Giants	9–3	**Curt Simmons** (15–13)	Larry Jansen (10–16)	None	4,100	81–69–2
153	September 23	Giants	2–1	**Robin Roberts** (23–15)	Marv Grissom (6–8)	None	4,030	82–69–2
154	September 25	Dodgers	3–4	Clem Labine (11–6)	**Bob Miller** (8–9)	None	11,324	82–70–2
155	September 26	Dodgers	2–1 (10)	**Curt Simmons** (16–13)	Bob Milliken (8–4)	None	15,046	83–70–2
156	September 27	Dodgers	2–8	Billy Loes (14–8)	**Robin Roberts** (23–16)	Ben Wade (3)	16,637	83–71–2

^{^[a]}The second game on July 5 was suspended (Sunday curfew) in the top of the seventh inning with the score 0–7 and was completed August 11, 1953.
^{^[b]}The original schedule indicated single games on September 20 and 21.

=== Roster ===
1953 Philadelphia Phillies
**Roster**
**Pitchers**: 22 Karl Drews; 20 Andy Hansen; 34 Thornton Kipper; 35 Jim Konstanty; 18 Johnny Lindell; 19 Bob Miller; 33,27 Kent Peterson; 33 Tom Qualters; 37 Steve Ridzik; 36 Robin Roberts; 28 Curt Simmons; 34 Paul Stuffel	**Catchers**: 21 Smoky Burgess; 29 Stan Lopata; **Infielders**: 3 Tommy Glaviano; 2 Granny Hamner; 6 Willie Jones; 7 Ted Kazanski; 7 Jack Lohrke; 8 Connie Ryan; 9 Earl Torgeson; 4 Eddie Waitkus	**Outfielders**: 1 Richie Ashburn; 6,16 Mel Clark; 14 Del Ennis; 15 Jackie Mayo; 12 Bill Nicholson; 23 Stan Palys; 17 Johnny Wyrostek	**Manager**: 24 Steve O'Neill; **Coaches**: 11 Benny Bengough; 32 Eddie Mayo; 40 Maje McDonnell; 31 Cy Perkins; 25 Ken Silvestri

== Player stats ==
= Indicates team leader

=== Batting ===
==== Starters by position ====
Note: Pos = Position; G = Games played; AB = At bats; H = Hits; Avg. = Batting average; HR = Home runs; RBI = Runs batted in

Pos	Player	G	AB	H	Avg.	HR	RBI
C	Smoky Burgess	102	312	91	.292	4	36
1B	Earl Torgeson	111	379	104	.274	11	64
2B	Granny Hamner	154	609	168	.276	21	92
SS	Ted Kazanski	95	360	78	.217	2	27
3B	Willie Jones	149	481	108	.225	19	70
OF	Del Ennis	152	578	165	.285	29	125
OF	Johnny Wyrostek	125	409	111	.271	6	47
OF	Richie Ashburn	156	622	205	.330	2	57

==== Other batters ====
Note: G = Games played; AB = At bats; H = Hits; Avg. = Batting average; HR = Home runs; RBI = Runs batted in

Player	G	AB	H	Avg.	HR	RBI
Connie Ryan	90	247	73	.296	5	26
Eddie Waitkus	81	247	72	.291	1	16
Stan Lopata	81	234	56	.239	8	31
Mel Clark	60	198	59	.298	0	19
Tommy Glaviano	53	74	15	.203	3	5
Bill Nicholson	38	62	13	.210	2	16
Jack Lohrke	12	13	2	.154	0	0
Jackie Mayo	5	4	0	.000	0	0
Stan Palys	2	2	0	.000	0	0

=== Pitching ===
= Indicates league leader

==== Starting pitchers ====
Note: G = Games pitched; IP = Innings pitched; W = Wins; L = Losses; ERA = Earned run average; SO = Strikeouts

Player	G	IP	W	L	ERA	SO
Robin Roberts	44	346.2	23*	16	2.75	198
Curt Simmons	32	238.0	16	13	3.21	138

- Tied with Warren Spahn (Milwaukee) for league lead

==== Other pitchers ====
Note: G = Games pitched; IP = Innings pitched; W = Wins; L = Losses; ERA = Earned run average; SO = Strikeouts

Player	G	IP	W	L	ERA	SO
Karl Drews	47	185.1	9	10	4.52	72
Jim Konstanty	48	170.2	14	10	4.43	45
Bob Miller	35	157.1	8	9	4.00	63
Steve Ridzik	42	124.0	9	6	3.77	53
Johnny Lindell	5	23.1	1	1	4.24	16

==== Relief pitchers ====
Note: G = Games pitched; W = Wins; L = Losses; SV = Saves; ERA = Earned run average; SO = Strikeouts

Player	G	W	L	SV	ERA	SO
Andy Hansen	30	0	2	3	4.03	17
Thornton Kipper	20	3	3	0	4.73	15
Kent Peterson	15	0	1	0	6.67	20
Paul Stuffel	2	0	0	0	inf	0
Tom Qualters	1	0	0	0	162.00	0

== Awards and honors ==
All-Star Game

- Robin Roberts

=== League leaders ===
- Robin Roberts, National League leader, complete games (33). Nobody had more complete games in one season throughout the 1950s.

== Farm system ==
Level	Team	League	Manager
AAA	Baltimore Orioles	International League	Don Heffner
A	Schenectady Blue Jays	Eastern League	Skeeter Newsome
A	Spokane Indians	Western International League	Don Osborn
B	Terre Haute Phillies	Illinois–Indiana–Iowa League	Hub Kittle
C	Salt Lake City Bees	Pioneer League	Eddie Murphy and Charlie Gassaway
C	Granby Phillies	Provincial League	Al Barillari
D	Pulaski Phillies	Appalachian League	Al Gardella
D	Mattoon Phillies	Mississippi–Ohio Valley League	Jim Deery
D	Bradford Phillies	PONY League	John Davenport

LEAGUE CHAMPIONS: Spokane, Salt Lake City
