= 1953 Pittsburgh Pirates season =

1953 Pittsburgh Pirates
- League: National League
- Ballpark: Forbes Field
- City: Pittsburgh, Pennsylvania
- Owners: John W. Galbreath (majority shareholder); Bing Crosby, Thomas P. Johnson, Branch Rickey (minority shareholders)
- General managers: Branch Rickey
- Managers: Fred Haney
- Radio: WWSW; Rosey Rowswell, Bob Prince

The 1953 Pittsburgh Pirates season was the 72nd in franchise history. In April 1953, the New York Yankees visited Forbes Field and played two preseason games against the Pirates. Mickey Mantle hit a 500-foot home run that landed on the roof.

== Offseason ==
- October 14, 1952: Gus Bell was traded by the Pirates to the Cincinnati Reds for Cal Abrams, Joe Rossi, and Gail Henley.
- Prior to 1953 season: Don Williams was signed as an amateur free agent by the Pirates.
- March 19, 1953: Johnny O'Brien was signed by the Pirates as an amateur free agent (bonus baby).
- March 19, 1953: Eddie O'Brien was signed by the Pirates as an amateur free agent (bonus baby).

== Regular season ==
=== Season standings ===
National League
Team	W	L	Pct.	GB	Home	Road
Brooklyn Dodgers	105	49	.682	—	60‍–‍17	45‍–‍32
Milwaukee Braves	92	62	.597	13	45‍–‍31	47‍–‍31
Philadelphia Phillies	83	71	.539	22	48‍–‍29	35‍–‍42
St. Louis Cardinals	83	71	.539	22	48‍–‍30	35‍–‍41
New York Giants	70	84	.455	35	38‍–‍39	32‍–‍45
Cincinnati Redlegs	68	86	.442	37	38‍–‍39	30‍–‍47
Chicago Cubs	65	89	.422	40	43‍–‍34	22‍–‍55
Pittsburgh Pirates	50	104	.325	55	26‍–‍51	24‍–‍53

=== Record vs. opponents ===
1953 National League record Sources:
Team	BRO	CHC	CIN	MIL	NYG	PHI	PIT	STL
Brooklyn	—	13–9–1	15–7	13–9	15–7	14–8	20–2	15–7
Chicago	9–13–1	—	12–10	8–14	9–13	5–17	11–11	11–11
Cincinnati	7–15	10–12	—	8–14	9–13	12–10	15–7	7–15–1
Milwaukee	9–13	14–8	14–8	—	14–8–1	13–9–1	15–7	13–9–1
New York	7–15	13–9	13–9	8–14–1	—	9–13	11–11	9–13
Philadelphia	8–14	17–5	10–12	9–13–1	13–9	—	15–7	11–11–1
Pittsburgh	2–20	11–11	7–15	7–15	11–11	7–15	—	5–17
St. Louis	7–15	11–11	15–7–1	9–13–1	13–9	11–11–1	17–5	—

=== Game log ===
1953 Game Log: 50–104 (Home: 26–51; Away: 24–53)
April: 5–9 (Home: 5–3; Away: 0–6)

#	Date	Opponent	Score	Win	Loss	Save	Attendance	Record
1	April 14	@ Dodgers	5–8	Black	**Dickson** (0–1)	—	12,433	0–1
2	April 15	@ Dodgers	2–4	Meyer	**Lindell** (0–1)	—	3,149	0–2
3	April 16	Phillies	14–12	**Dickson** (1–1)	Hansen	—	16,220	1–2
4	April 19	Dodgers	4–12	Erskine	**Dickson** (1–2)	—	8,801	1–3
5	April 21	Giants	5–4	**Friend** (1–0)	Maglie	—		2–3
6	April 22	Giants	2–4	Hearn	**LaPalme** (0–1)	Wilhelm	10,603	2–4
7	April 23	Giants	6–5	**Pollet** (1–0)	Koslo	**Hetki** (1)	4,372	3–4
8	April 24	@ Phillies	3–5	Konstanty	**Hall** (0–1)	—	6,506	3–5
9	April 25	@ Phillies	6–7	Simmons	**Lindell** (0–2)	Hansen	6,265	3–6
10	April 26	@ Phillies	5–7	Roberts	**Friend** (1–1)	—		3–7
11	April 26	@ Phillies	1–8	Drews	**Macdonald** (0–1)	—	18,490	3–8
12	April 28	Cubs	3–5	Rush	**LaPalme** (0–2)	Leonard	5,870	3–9
13	April 29	Cubs	4–3	**Dickson** (2–2)	Hacker	—	8,744	4–9
14	April 30	Cubs	4–2	**Face** (1–0)	Minner	—	2,930	5–9

May: 8–19 (Home: 6–8; Away: 2–11)

#	Date	Opponent	Score	Win	Loss	Save	Attendance	Record
15	May 1	Reds	8–3	**Pettit** (1–0)	Perkowski	**Dickson** (1)	14,826	6–9
16	May 2	Reds	12–4	**LaPalme** (1–2)	Podbielan	—	7,437	7–9
17	May 3	Cardinals	8–2	**Lindell** (1–2)	Haddix	—	26,001	8–9
18	May 4	Cardinals	0–5	Mizell	**Dickson** (2–3)	—	18,778	8–10
19	May 9	@ Giants	2–0	**Lindell** (2–2)	Jansen	—		9–10
20	May 9	@ Giants	4–6	Wilhelm	**Pettit** (1–1)	—	9,889	9–11
21	May 10	@ Giants	0–4	Maglie	**Dickson** (2–4)	—		9–12
22	May 10	@ Giants	2–3	Hiller	**Pollet** (1–1)	—	17,940	9–13
23	May 14	@ Braves	2–3	Wilson	**Lindell** (2–3)	—	15,438	9–14
24	May 15	@ Braves	3–4	Surkont	**Friend** (1–2)	—	8,744	9–15
25	May 16	@ Cubs	3–2	**Dickson** (3–4)	Rush	**Hetki** (2)	9,728	10–15
26	May 17	@ Cubs	2–6	Minner	**LaPalme** (1–3)	—		10–16
27	May 17	@ Cubs	3–7 (7)	Klippstein	**Pettit** (1–2)	Hacker	7,745	10–17
28	May 19	@ Cardinals	1–2	Staley	**Lindell** (2–4)	Miller	7,607	10–18
29	May 20	@ Cardinals	6–11	Presko	**Friend** (1–3)	Brazle	5,715	10–19
30	May 21	Phillies	7–2	**Dickson** (4–4)	Drews	—	7,507	11–19
31	May 23	Giants	8–4	**LaPalme** (2–3)	Gomez	—	7,444	12–19
32	May 24	Giants	3–11	Jansen	**Lindell** (2–5)	Wilhelm	20,966	12–20
33	May 25	Giants	3–6	Hiller	**Friend** (1–4)	—	2,369	12–21
34	May 27	Phillies	2–14	Roberts	**Dickson** (4–5)	—		12–22
35	May 27	Phillies	8–6	**Face** (2–0)	Drews	**Dickson** (2)	16,935	13–22
36	May 28	Phillies	8–9	Konstanty	**LaPalme** (2–4)	—	2,437	13–23
37	May 29	Dodgers	4–7	Meyer	**Lindell** (2–6)	Hughes	3,902	13–24
38	May 30	Dodgers	4–7	Wade	**Dickson** (4–6)	—		13–25
39	May 30	Dodgers	1–4	Podres	**Friend** (1–5)	Erskine	31,029	13–26
40	May 31	@ Dodgers	3–4	Loes	**LaPalme** (2–5)	Hughes	25,277	13–27
41	May 31	@ Dodgers	1–4 (7)	Milliken	**Hetki** (0–1)	—	25,277	13–28

June: 12–22 (Home: 6–11; Away: 6–11)

#	Date	Opponent	Score	Win	Loss	Save	Attendance	Record
42	June 2	Cubs	4–3 (11)	**Hetki** (1–1)	Klippstein	—	8,158	14–28
43	June 3	Cubs	1–0	**LaPalme** (3–5)	Hacker	—	8,165	15–28
44	June 4	Cubs	6–1	**Hall** (1–1)	Minner	—	3,182	16–28
45	June 5	Reds	4–7	Wehmeier	**Bowman** (0–1)	—	12,229	16–29
46	June 6	Reds	7–15	Smith	**Friend** (1–6)	Collum	6,685	16–30
47	June 7	Reds	1–6	Podbielan	**Schultz** (0–1)	—		16–31
48	June 7	Reds	6–11	Nuxhall	**Lindell** (2–7)	Perkowski	9,021	16–32
49	June 8	Cardinals	3–5 (12)	Brazle	**Hetki** (1–2)	Miller	7,643	16–33
50	June 9	Cardinals	7–4	**Hall** (2–1)	Haddix	—	1,894	17–33
51	June 10	Cardinals	1–5	Presko	**Friend** (1–7)	White	8,937	17–34
52	June 11	Cardinals	3–5	Miller	**Lindell** (2–8)	White	2,178	17–35
53	June 12	Braves	4–2	**Dickson** (5–6)	Antonelli	—		18–35
54	June 12	Braves	2–11	Surkont	**Schultz** (0–2)	—	17,344	18–36
55	June 13	Braves	4–5	Burdette	**LaPalme** (3–6)	—	5,134	18–37
56	June 14	Braves	3–7	Liddle	**Hall** (2–2)	—		18–38
57	June 14	Braves	0–8	Buhl	**Bowman** (0–2)	—	15,083	18–39
58	June 15	Braves	3–2 (10)	**Friend** (2–7)	Wilson	—	6,548	19–39
59	June 16	@ Cubs	6–5	**Lindell** (3–8)	Minner	—		20–39
60	June 16	@ Cubs	2–3	Pollet	**Dickson** (5–7)	Klippstein	11,427	20–40
61	June 17	@ Cubs	4–5 (16)	Lown	**Hetki** (1–3)	—	5,422	20–41
62	June 18	@ Cubs	4–8	Rush	**Hall** (2–3)	Leonard	3,969	20–42
63	June 19	@ Cardinals	2–10	Mizell	**LaPalme** (3–7)	—	7,552	20–43
64	June 20	@ Cardinals	1–2	Presko	**Friend** (2–8)	—	9,019	20–44
65	June 21	@ Cardinals	5–2	**Dickson** (6–7)	Miller	—	10,451	21–44
66	June 22	@ Cardinals	3–6	Staley	**Lindell** (3–9)	—	5,625	21–45
67	June 23	@ Braves	1–0	**Hall** (3–3)	Spahn	—	26,299	22–45
68	June 24	@ Braves	10–1	**Face** (3–0)	Bickford	—	21,438	23–45
69	June 25	@ Braves	6–4 (12)	**Hetki** (2–3)	Buhl	—	14,841	24–45
70	June 26	@ Reds	4–8	Nuxhall	**Dickson** (6–8)	King		24–46
71	June 26	@ Reds	1–4	Collum	**LaPalme** (3–8)	—	7,758	24–47
72	June 27	@ Reds	5–15	Perkowski	**Face** (3–1)	—	2,599	24–48
73	June 28	@ Reds	1–4	Baczewski	**Hall** (3–4)	—		24–49
74	June 28	@ Reds	2–9	Raffensberger	**Bowman** (0–3)	—	10,432	24–50
75	June 30	@ Giants	3–1	**Dickson** (7–8)	Gomez	—	13,805	25–50

July: 8–23 (Home: 5–15; Away: 3–8)

#	Date	Opponent	Score	Win	Loss	Save	Attendance	Record
76	July 1	@ Giants	5–3 (11)	**Hetki** (3–3)	Wilhelm	—	4,429	26–50
77	July 4	@ Dodgers	5–6	Hughes	**Hall** (3–5)	Wade	30,029	26–51
78	July 4	@ Dodgers	5–2	**Friend** (3–8)	Loes	—	30,029	27–51
79	July 5	Phillies	0–2 (10)	Roberts	**Dickson** (7–9)	—		27–52
80	July 5	Phillies	7–4	**Waugh** (1–0)	Ridzik	**LaPalme** (1)	11,404	28–52
81	July 6	Dodgers	2–14	Meyer	**LaPalme** (3–9)	Hughes	13,497	28–53
82	July 7	Dodgers	4–5	Erskine	**Lindell** (3–10)	Wade		28–54
83	July 7	Dodgers	5–9	Roe	**Hall** (3–6)	Milliken	9,687	28–55
84	July 8	Giants	7–10 (11)	Jansen	**Hetki** (3–4)	Koslo	7,095	28–56
85	July 9	Giants	0–4	Gomez	**Face** (3–2)	—	3,391	28–57
86	July 10	@ Phillies	3–13	Simmons	**Dickson** (7–10)	—	6,466	28–58
87	July 11	@ Phillies	4–8	Ridzik	**Dickson** (7–11)	—	3,608	28–59
88	July 12	@ Phillies	4–6	Roberts	**Face** (3–3)	—		28–60
89	July 12	@ Phillies	5–6	Ridzik	**LaPalme** (3–10)	—	10,806	28–61
90	July 16	Braves	5–2	**Friend** (4–8)	Antonelli	—	11,775	29–61
91	July 17	Braves	2–8	Spahn	**Hall** (3–7)	—	11,565	29–62
92	July 18	Braves	3–4	Liddle	**Waugh** (1–1)	Burdette	4,674	29–63
93	July 19	Cardinals	2–8	Haddix	**Dickson** (7–12)	—		29–64
94	July 19	Cardinals	6–4	**LaPalme** (4–10)	Mizell	—	9,045	30–64
95	July 20	Cardinals	4–9	Chambers	**Friend** (4–9)	White	9,045	30–65
96	July 21	Reds	2–7	Raffensberger	**Waugh** (1–2)	—	7,594	30–66
97	July 22	Reds	3–2	**LaPalme** (5–10)	Collum	—	1,567	31–66
98	July 23	Reds	0–7	Perkowski	**Dickson** (7–13)	—	1,807	31–67
99	July 24	Cubs	1–7	Minner	**Hall** (3–8)	—	10,406	31–68
100	July 25	Cubs	4–5	Lown	**Lindell** (3–11)	Leonard	4,217	31–69
101	July 26	Cubs	3–2	**Face** (4–3)	Leonard	—		32–69
102	July 26	Cubs	3–7	Hacker	**Waugh** (1–3)	Klippstein	11,358	32–70
103	July 28	@ Cardinals	4–6	Chambers	**LaPalme** (5–11)	Presko	7,973	32–71
104	July 29	@ Cardinals	2–8	Haddix	**Lindell** (3–12)	—	7,418	32–72
105	July 30	@ Cardinals	4–10	Erautt	**Hetki** (3–5)	—	3,402	32–73
106	July 31	@ Cubs	4–0	**Dickson** (8–13)	Minner	—	5,412	33–73

August: 8–22 (Home: 2–11; Away: 6–11)

#	Date	Opponent	Score	Win	Loss	Save	Attendance	Record
107	August 1	@ Cubs	10–3	**Lindell** (4–12)	Pollet	—	8,017	34–73
108	August 2	@ Cubs	6–7 (11)	Lown	**Dickson** (8–14)	—	14,110	34–74
109	August 3	@ Reds	0–5	Nuxhall	**LaPalme** (5–12)	—	3,499	34–75
110	August 4	@ Reds	2–1	**Face** (5–3)	Collum	**Dickson** (3)	4,463	35–75
111	August 5	@ Reds	6–4	**Waugh** (2–3)	Podbielan	**Hetki** (3)	1,797	36–75
112	August 6	@ Reds	4–3	**Lindell** (5–12)	King	**LaPalme** (2)	2,054	37–75
113	August 7	@ Braves	2–9	Bickford	**Dickson** (8–15)	—	26,902	37–76
114	August 8	@ Braves	4–7	Burdette	**Hall** (3–9)	—	17,163	37–77
115	August 9	@ Braves	4–7	Johnson	**LaPalme** (5–13)	Liddle		37–78
116	August 9	@ Braves	3–10	Wilson	**Face** (5–4)	—	33,376	37–79
117	August 11	Phillies	0–3	Simmons	**Dickson** (8–16)	—	8,985	37–80
118	August 12	Phillies	4–8	Roberts	**Lindell** (5–13)	—	6,505	37–81
119	August 13	Phillies	4–3	**LaPalme** (6–13)	Miller	—	2,373	38–81
120	August 15	@ Dodgers	6–14	Wade	**Face** (5–5)	—	12,842	38–82
121	August 16	@ Dodgers	1–3	Roe	**Hall** (3–10)	—	18,550	38–83
122	August 16	@ Dodgers	5–9	Erskine	**Dickson** (8–17)	Labine	18,550	38–84
123	August 17	@ Dodgers	2–5 (11)	Labine	**Lindell** (5–14)	—	9,943	38–85
124	August 18	@ Phillies	0–1	Ridzik	**LaPalme** (6–14)	Roberts	3,945	38–86
125	August 19	@ Phillies	5–3	**Face** (6–5)	Simmons	—	4,554	39–86
126	August 20	@ Phillies	5–2	**Waugh** (3–3)	Roberts	—	4,376	40–86
127	August 21	Dodgers	7–1	**Dickson** (9–17)	Podres	—	12,459	41–86
128	August 22	Dodgers	3–5	Roe	**Hall** (3–11)	Labine	7,033	41–87
129	August 23	Dodgers	4–10	Meyer	**Lindell** (5–15)	—	1,848	41–88
130	August 23	Dodgers	7–9	Labine	**Friend** (4–10)	—	1,848	41–89
131	August 25	Reds	6–8	Collum	**Hetki** (3–6)	Kelly		41–90
132	August 25	Reds	8–9	Baczewski	**Bowman** (0–4)	—	8,370	41–91
133	August 28	Cardinals	9–10	White	**Hall** (3–12)	Staley	7,021	41–92
134	August 29	Cardinals	4–5	Mizell	**Dickson** (9–18)	Brazle	3,145	41–93
135	August 30	Braves	4–19	Antonelli	**Lindell** (5–16)	—		41–94
136	August 30	Braves	5–11	Liddle	**LaPalme** (6–15)	—	9,458	41–95

September: 9–9 (Home: 2–3; Away: 7–6)

#	Date	Opponent	Score	Win	Loss	Save	Attendance	Record
137	September 2	Cubs	8–1	**Friend** (5–10)	Simpson	—	5,659	42–95
138	September 6	Phillies	2–7	Drews	**Face** (6–6)	—	5,890	42–96
139	September 7	@ Giants	9–7	**Friend** (6–10)	Worthington	—		43–96
140	September 7	@ Giants	5–3	**LaPalme** (7–15)	Hearn	—	6,903	44–96
141	September 9	@ Cubs	7–8	Simpson	**Face** (6–7)	—	2,319	44–97
142	September 11	@ Cardinals	3–5	Mizell	**Waugh** (3–4)	Brazle	4,728	44–98
143	September 12	@ Cardinals	8–7 (12)	**Dickson** (10–18)	Chambers	—	4,119	45–98
144	September 13	@ Reds	5–4	**LaPalme** (8–15)	Raffensberger	—		46–98
145	September 13	@ Reds	6–8	Smith	**Dickson** (10–19)	—	7,454	46–99
146	September 15	@ Braves	7–5	**Friend** (7–10)	Burdette	**Hall** (1)	32,145	47–99
147	September 16	@ Braves	3–7	Buhl	**Face** (6–8)	—	18,912	47–100
148	September 19	@ Giants	1–4	Worthington	**LaPalme** (8–16)	Jansen		47–101
149	September 19	@ Giants	6–5	**Waugh** (4–4)	Hearn	**Dickson** (4)	2,744	48–101
150	September 20	@ Giants	8–4	**Friend** (8–10)	Gomez	—	4,717	49–101
151	September 22	@ Dodgers	4–5	Podres	**Hogue** (0–1)	Labine	2,365	49–102
152	September 25	Giants	2–6	Worthington	**Friend** (8–11)	—	3,367	49–103
153	September 26	Giants	3–5	Jansen	**Waugh** (4–5)	—	1,385	49–104
154	September 27	Giants	6–4	**Hogue** (1–1)	Corwin	—	17,367	50–104

Legend: = Win = Loss
Bold = Pirates team member

=== Notable transactions ===
- June 4, 1953: Ralph Kiner, Joe Garagiola, Catfish Metkovich, and Howie Pollet were traded by the Pirates to the Chicago Cubs for Toby Atwell, Bob Schultz, Preston Ward, George Freese, Bob Addis, Gene Hermanski, and $150,000.
- June 14, 1953: Pete Castiglione was traded by the Pirates to the St. Louis Cardinals for Hal Rice.

=== Roster ===
1953 Pittsburgh Pirates
**Roster**
**Pitchers**: 32 Roger Bowman; 22 Murry Dickson; 26 Roy Face; 19 Bob Friend; 36 Bob Hall; 29 Johnny Hetki; 32 Cal Hogue; 24 Paul LaPalme; 28 Johnny Lindell; 25 Bill Macdonald; 35 Woody Main; 20 Paul Pettit; 11 Howie Pollet; 37 Bob Schultz; 23 Jim Waugh	**Catchers**: 11 Toby Atwell; 9 Ed Fitz Gerald; 3 Joe Garagiola; 31 Vic Janowicz; 9 Nick Koback; 14 Pete Naton; 6 Mike Sandlock; 10 Jack Shepard; **Infielders**: 16 Pete Castiglione; 12 Dick Cole; 5 Dick Hall; 44 Catfish Metkovich; 27 Eddie O'Brien; 30 Johnny O'Brien; 10 Danny O'Connell; 13 Eddie Pellagrini; 7 Dick Smith; 21 Paul Smith; 5 Preston Ward	**Outfielders**: 18 Cal Abrams; 17 Carlos Bernier; 16 Brandy Davis; 7 Gene Hermanski; 4 Ralph Kiner; 14 Felipe Montemayor; 44 Hal Rice; 15 Frank Thomas; **Other batters**: 39 Bob Addis; 37 Clem Koshorek	**Manager**: 2 Fred Haney; **Coaches**: 40 John Fitzpatrick; 43 Sam Narron; 42 Bill Posedel; 41 Clyde Sukeforth

== Player stats ==
=== Batting ===
==== Starters by position ====
Note: Pos = Position; G = Games played; AB = At bats; H = Hits; Avg. = Batting average; HR = Home runs; RBI = Runs batted in

Pos	Player	G	AB	H	Avg.	HR	RBI
C	Mike Sandlock	64	186	43	.231	0	12
1B	Preston Ward	88	281	59	.210	8	27
2B	Johnny O'Brien	89	279	69	.247	2	22
SS	Eddie O'Brien	89	261	62	.238	0	14
3B	Danny O'Connell	149	588	173	.294	7	55
OF	Cal Abrams	119	448	128	.286	15	43
OF	Frank Thomas	128	455	116	.255	30	102
OF	Carlos Bernier	105	310	66	.213	3	31

==== Other batters ====
Note: G = Games played; AB = At bats; H = Hits; Avg. = Batting average; HR = Home runs; RBI = Runs batted in

Player	G	AB	H	Avg.	HR	RBI
Paul Smith	118	389	110	.283	4	44
Hal Rice	78	286	89	.311	4	42
Dick Cole	97	235	64	.272	0	23
Eddie Pellagrini	78	174	44	.253	4	19
Pete Castiglione	45	159	33	.208	4	21
Ralph Kiner	41	148	40	.270	7	29
Toby Atwell	53	139	34	.245	0	17
Vic Janowicz	42	123	31	.252	2	8
Joe Garagiola	27	73	17	.233	2	14
Gene Hermanski	41	62	11	.177	1	4
Felipe Montemayor	28	55	6	.109	0	2
Dick Smith	13	43	7	.163	0	2
Catfish Metkovich	26	41	6	.146	1	7
Brandy Davis	12	39	8	.205	0	2
Dick Hall	7	24	4	.167	0	1
Ed Fitz Gerald	6	17	2	.118	0	1
Nick Koback	7	16	2	.125	0	0
Pete Naton	6	12	2	.167	0	1
Jack Shepard	2	4	1	.250	0	0
Bob Addis	4	3	0	.000	0	0
Clem Koshorek	1	1	0	.000	0	0

=== Pitching ===
==== Starting pitchers ====
Note: G = Games pitched; IP = Innings pitched; W = Wins; L = Losses; ERA = Earned run average; SO = Strikeouts

Player	G	IP	W	L	ERA	SO
Paul LaPalme	35	176.1	8	16	4.59	86
Johnny Lindell	27	175.2	5	16	4.71	102
Bob Friend	32	170.2	8	11	4.90	66

==== Other pitchers ====
Note: G = Games pitched; IP = Innings pitched; W = Wins; L = Losses; ERA = Earned run average; SO = Strikeouts

Player	G	IP	W	L	ERA	SO
Murry Dickson	45	200.2	10	19	4.53	88
Bob Hall	37	152.0	3	12	5.39	68
Roy Face	41	119.0	6	8	6.58	56
Jim Waugh	29	90.1	4	5	6.48	23
Paul Pettit	10	28.0	1	2	7.71	14
Cal Hogue	3	19.0	1	1	5.21	10
Howie Pollet	5	12.2	1	1	10.66	8
Bill Macdonald	4	7.1	0	1	12.27	4

==== Relief pitchers ====
Note: G = Games pitched; W = Wins; L = Losses; SV = Saves; ERA = Earned run average; SO = Strikeouts

Player	G	W	L	SV	ERA	SO
Johnny Hetki	54	3	6	3	3.95	37
Roger Bowman	30	0	4	0	4.82	36
Bob Schultz	11	0	2	0	8.20	5
Woody Main	2	0	0	0	11.25	4

== Farm system ==
Level	Team	League	Manager
AA	New Orleans Pelicans	Southern Association	Danny Murtaugh
A	Charleston Rebels	Sally League	Frank Oceak, Norm Shope and Larry Shepard
A	Denver Bears	Western League	Andy Cohen
B	Waco/Longview Pirates	Big State League	Buster Chatham
B	Burlington-Graham Pirates	Carolina League	Stan Wentzel
C	Billings Mustangs	Pioneer League	Cliff Dapper
C	St. Jean Canadiens	Provincial League	George Genovese
C	Hutchinson Elks	Western Association	Wes Griffin
D	Bristol Twins	Appalachian League	George Detore
D	Dublin Irish	Georgia State League	John George and Frank Oceak
D	Brunswick Pirates	Georgia–Florida League	Jack Paepke
D	Batavia Clippers	PONY League	George Kinnamon

LEAGUE CHAMPIONS: Hutchinson, Brunswick
Waco franchise transferred to Longview, May 22, 1953
