= 1952 Hollywood Stars season =

1952 Hollywood Stars
- League: Pacific Coast League
- Ballpark: Gilmore Field
- City: Hollywood
- Record: 109–71
- League place: 1st
- Managers: Fred Haney

The 1952 Hollywood Stars season, was the 44th season in the history of the Hollywood Stars baseball team. The Stars were the successors to the Vernon Tigers and Mission Reds. The Stars played their home games at Gilmore Field which was adjacent to the site where CBS Television City was erected during the 1952 baseball season.

The team, also known at the Twinks, compiled a 109–71 record and won the Pacific Coast League (PCL) pennant. It was the Stars' second PCL pennant in four years.

Manager Fred Haney was given substantial credit for the team's success. After the team's power hitter Gus Bell was called up by the Pittsburgh Pirates early in the season, Haney built a team that was focused on a strategy of speed, defense, and advancing base runners into scoring position. After the season, sports columnist Claude Newman wrote: "[T]hey played the kind of baseball that was in vogue before everybody became long-ball happy. They concentrated on percentage baseball, utilizing the bunt and the steal and the timely hit. . . . What Haney did was parlay speed and defense into a league pennant." Haney became manager of the Pirates in 1953.

Pitcher Johnny Lindell was the leader of the Stars' pitching staff and was selected as the PCL's most valuable player for 1952. Lindell compiled a 24–9 win–loss record with a 2.52 earned run average (ERA) and 190 strikeouts. Lindell also tallied eight home runs in 1952 and appeared in games in the outfield, at first base, and as a pinch hitter.

Pitcher Paul LaPalme also impressed after being acquired from the Pirates late in the season. He won his first five games and finished with a 6–1 record and led the team with a 1.29 ERA.

Left fielder Carlos Bernier, a native of Puerto Rico, was the offensive star of the 1952 Hollywood team. Bernier led the club with a .301 batting average. Nicknamed "Bandit" and "El Bandido", he led the PCL in 1952 with 105 runs scored and 65 stolen bases and was selected as the PCL's rookie of the year.

Bernier was joined in the outfield by center fielder Tom Saffell and right fielder Ted Beard. Columnist Claude Newman boasted that Bernier, Saffell, and Beard were "the finest defensive outfield in baseball this year."

Lindell and Bernier were both sold to the Pirates following the 1952 season.

== Players ==
=== Batting ===
Note: Pos = Position; G = Games played; AB = At bats; H = Hits; Avg. = Batting average; HR = Home runs; RBI = Runs batted in

Pos	Player	G	AB	H	Avg.	HR	RBI
LF	Carlos Bernier	171	652	196	.301	9	79
C	Mike Sandlock	101	353	106	.300	9	53
SS	Dick Cole	178	602	172	.286	8	73
1B	Jack Phillips	111	374	107	.286	0	31
2B	Monty Basgall	149	578	161	.279	8	63
1B	Chuck Stevens	142	490	136	.278	2	57
CF	Tom Saffell	154	495	135	.273	4	57
3B	Gene Handley	131	456	125	.274	0	46
RF	Ted Beard	127	390	105	.269	11	53
LF	Frankie Kelleher	82	222	53	.239	11	33

=== Pitching ===
Note: G = Games pitched; IP = Innings pitched; W = Wins; L = Losses; PCT = Win percentage; ERA = Earned run average; SO = Strikeouts

Player	G	IP	W	L	PCT	ERA	SO
Johnny Lindell	37	282	24	9	.727	2.52	190
Paul Pettit	31	197	15	8	.652	3.70	74
Mel Queen	29	205	14	9	.609	2.41	131
Pinky Woods	29	160	11	9	.550	3.88	79
Junior Walsh	36	172	10	9	.526	3.19	93
Paul LaPalme	9	56	6	1	.857	1.29	38
