= 1953 Brooklyn Dodgers season =

Major League Baseball season

1953 Brooklyn Dodgers
- National League champions
- League: National League
- Ballpark: Ebbets Field
- City: Brooklyn, New York
- Record: 105–49 (.682)
- League place: 1st
- Owners: Walter O'Malley, James & Dearie Mulvey, Mary Louise Smith
- President: Walter O'Malley
- General managers: Buzzie Bavasi
- Managers: Chuck Dressen
- Television: WOR-TV; WPIX; WABC-TV; WABD
- Radio: WMGM; Red Barber, Connie Desmond, Vin Scully

The 1953 Brooklyn Dodgers season was the 64th season for the Brooklyn Dodgers franchise in the MLB. The Dodgers repeated as National League champions by posting a 105–49 record. However, Brooklyn again failed to capture the World Series, losing in six games to the American League champion New York Yankees.

The Dodgers' .682 winning percentage in 1953 stood as the best single-season winning percentage in franchise history for a full season until 2022, when they posted a .685 mark (111–51). (In 2020, the Dodgers posted a .717 mark (43–17) during a shortened 60-game season.)

== Offseason ==
- October 10, 1952: Dixie Howell was purchased by the Dodgers from the Cincinnati Reds.
- October 10, 1952: Clyde King was purchased from the Dodgers by the Cincinnati Reds.
- October 14, 1952: Billy Hunter was traded by the Dodgers to the St. Louis Browns for Ray Coleman, Stan Rojek, Bob Mahoney and cash.
- January 17, 1953: Andy Pafko was traded by the Dodgers to the Milwaukee Braves for Roy Hartsfield and cash.
- February 16, 1953: The Dodgers traded Rocky Bridges to the Cincinnati Reds and Jim Pendleton to the Milwaukee Braves as part of a four-team trade. The Philadelphia Phillies sent Russ Meyer to the Dodgers. The Braves sent cash to the Reds and Earl Torgeson to the Phillies. The Reds sent Joe Adcock to the Braves, and the Phillies sent cash to the Braves.

== Regular season ==
Duke Snider had a hitting streak of 27 games.

=== Season standings ===
National League
Team	W	L	Pct.	GB	Home	Road
Brooklyn Dodgers	105	49	.682	—	60‍–‍17	45‍–‍32
Milwaukee Braves	92	62	.597	13	45‍–‍31	47‍–‍31
Philadelphia Phillies	83	71	.539	22	48‍–‍29	35‍–‍42
St. Louis Cardinals	83	71	.539	22	48‍–‍30	35‍–‍41
New York Giants	70	84	.455	35	38‍–‍39	32‍–‍45
Cincinnati Redlegs	68	86	.442	37	38‍–‍39	30‍–‍47
Chicago Cubs	65	89	.422	40	43‍–‍34	22‍–‍55
Pittsburgh Pirates	50	104	.325	55	26‍–‍51	24‍–‍53

=== Record vs. opponents ===
1953 National League record Sources:
Team	BRO	CHC	CIN	MIL	NYG	PHI	PIT	STL
Brooklyn	—	13–9–1	15–7	13–9	15–7	14–8	20–2	15–7
Chicago	9–13–1	—	12–10	8–14	9–13	5–17	11–11	11–11
Cincinnati	7–15	10–12	—	8–14	9–13	12–10	15–7	7–15–1
Milwaukee	9–13	14–8	14–8	—	14–8–1	13–9–1	15–7	13–9–1
New York	7–15	13–9	13–9	8–14–1	—	9–13	11–11	9–13
Philadelphia	8–14	17–5	10–12	9–13–1	13–9	—	15–7	11–11–1
Pittsburgh	2–20	11–11	7–15	7–15	11–11	7–15	—	5–17
St. Louis	7–15	11–11	15–7–1	9–13–1	13–9	11–11–1	17–5	—

=== Opening Day Lineup ===
Opening Day Lineup
#	Name	Position
19	Jim Gilliam	2B
1	Pee Wee Reese	SS
4	Duke Snider	CF
42	Jackie Robinson	3B
39	Roy Campanella	C
29	Don Thompson	LF
14	Gil Hodges	1B
6	Carl Furillo	RF
17	Carl Erskine	P

=== Notable transactions ===
- May 25, 1953: Bud Byerly was traded by the Dodgers to the New York Giants for Norman Fox (minors).

=== Roster ===
1953 Brooklyn Dodgers
Roster
Pitchers: 49 Joe Black; 13 Ralph Branca; 17 Carl Erskine; 18 Jim Hughes; 41 Clem Labine; 30 Billy Loes; 34 Russ Meyer; 46 Glenn Mickens; 25 Bob Milliken; 48 Ray Moore; 23 Erv Palica; 45 Johnny Podres; 28 Preacher Roe; 46 Ben Wade	Catchers: 39 Roy Campanella; 10 Rube Walker; Infielders: 5 Wayne Belardi; 3 Billy Cox; 19 Jim Gilliam; 14 Gil Hodges; 2 Bobby Morgan; 1 Pee Wee Reese	Outfielders: 24,32 Bill Antonello; 6 Carl Furillo; 48 Carmen Mauro; 42 Jackie Robinson; 8 George Shuba; 4 Duke Snider; 29 Don Thompson; 38 Dick Williams; Other batters: 9 Dixie Howell; 37 Dick Teed	Manager: 7 Charlie Dressen; Coaches: 22 Billy Herman; 27 Cookie Lavagetto; 31 Jake Pitler

== Player stats ==
=== Batting ===
==== Starters by position ====
Note: Pos = Position; G = Games played; AB = At bats; H = Hits; Avg. = Batting average; HR = Home runs; RBI = Runs batted in

Pos	Player	G	AB	H	Avg.	HR	RBI
C	Roy Campanella	144	519	162	.312	41	142
1B	Gil Hodges	141	520	157	.302	31	122
2B	Jim Gilliam	151	605	168	.278	6	63
3B	Billy Cox	100	327	95	.291	10	44
SS	Pee Wee Reese	140	524	142	.271	13	61
OF	Duke Snider	153	590	198	.336	42	126
OF	Jackie Robinson	136	484	159	.329	12	95
OF	Carl Furillo	132	479	165	.344	21	92

==== Other batters ====
Note: G = Games played; AB = At bats; H = Hits; Avg. = Batting average; HR = Home runs; RBI = Runs batted in

Player	G	AB	H	Avg.	HR	RBI
Bobby Morgan	69	196	51	.260	7	33
George Shuba	74	169	43	.254	5	23
Wayne Belardi	69	163	39	.239	11	34
Don Thompson	96	153	37	.242	1	12
Rube Walker	43	95	23	.242	3	9
Dick Williams	30	55	12	.218	2	5
Bill Antonello	40	43	7	.163	1	4
Carmen Mauro	8	9	0	.000	0	0
Dick Teed	1	1	0	.000	0	0
Dixie Howell	1	1	0	.000	0	0

=== Pitching ===
==== Starting pitchers ====
Note: G = Games pitched; IP = Innings pitched; W = Wins; L = Losses; ERA = Earned run average; SO = Strikeouts

Player	G	IP	W	L	ERA	SO
Carl Erskine	39	246.2	20	6	3.54	187
Russ Meyer	34	191.1	15	5	4.56	106
Billy Loes	32	162.2	14	8	4.54	75
Preacher Roe	25	157.0	11	3	4.36	85
Ray Moore	1	8.0	0	1	3.38	4

==== Other pitchers ====
Note: G = Games pitched; IP = Innings pitched; W = Wins; L = Losses; ERA = Earned run average; SO = Strikeouts

Player	G	IP	W	L	ERA	SO
Bob Milliken	37	117.2	8	4	3.37	65
Johnny Podres	33	115.0	9	4	4.23	82
Glenn Mickens	4	6.1	0	1	11.37	5

==== Relief pitchers ====
Note: G = Games pitched; W = Wins; L = Losses; SV = Saves; ERA = Earned run average; SO = Strikeouts

Player	G	W	L	SV	ERA	SO
Jim Hughes	48	4	3	9	3.47	49
Clem Labine	37	11	6	7	2.77	44
Joe Black	34	6	3	5	5.33	42
Ben Wade	32	7	5	3	3.79	65
Ralph Branca	7	0	0	0	9.82	5
Erv Palica	4	0	0	0	12.00	3

== 1953 World Series ==
=== Game 1 ===
September 30, 1953, at Yankee Stadium in New York

Team	1	2	3	4	5	6	7	8	9	R	H	E
Brooklyn (N)	0	0	0	0	1	3	1	0	0	5	12	2
New York (A)	4	0	0	0	1	0	1	3	x	9	12	0
W: Johnny Sain (1–0) L: Clem Labine (0–1)
HR: BRO – Jim Gilliam (1), Gil Hodges (1), George Shuba (1) NYY – Yogi Berra (1), Joe Collins (1)

=== Game 2 ===
October 1, 1953, at Yankee Stadium in New York

Team	1	2	3	4	5	6	7	8	9	R	H	E
Brooklyn (N)	0	0	0	2	0	0	0	0	0	2	9	1
New York (A)	1	0	0	0	0	0	1	2	x	4	5	0
W: Ed Lopat (1–0) L: Preacher Roe (0–1)
HR: NYY – Billy Martin (1), Mickey Mantle (1)

=== Game 3 ===
October 2, 1953, at Ebbets Field in Brooklyn, New York

Team	1	2	3	4	5	6	7	8	9	R	H	E
New York (A)	0	0	0	0	1	0	0	1	0	2	6	0
Brooklyn (N)	0	0	0	0	1	1	0	1	x	3	9	0
W: Carl Erskine (1–0) L: Vic Raschi (0–1)
HR: BRO – Roy Campanella (1)

=== Game 4 ===
October 3, 1953, at Ebbets Field in Brooklyn, New York

Team	1	2	3	4	5	6	7	8	9	R	H	E
New York (A)	0	0	0	0	2	0	0	0	1	3	9	0
Brooklyn (N)	3	0	0	1	0	2	1	0	x	7	12	0
W: Billy Loes (1–0) L: Whitey Ford (0–1) S: Clem Labine (1)
HR: NYY – Gil McDougald (1) BRO – Duke Snider (1)

=== Game 5 ===
October 4, 1953, at Ebbets Field in Brooklyn, New York

Team	1	2	3	4	5	6	7	8	9	R	H	E
New York (A)	1	0	5	0	0	0	3	1	1	11	11	1
Brooklyn (N)	0	1	0	0	1	0	0	4	1	7	14	1
W: Jim McDonald (1–0) L: Johnny Podres (0–1) S: Allie Reynolds (1)
HR: NYY – Gene Woodling (1), Mickey Mantle (2), Billy Martin (2), Gil McDougald (2) BRO – Billy Cox (1), Jim Gilliam (1)

=== Game 6 ===
October 5, 1953, at Yankee Stadium in New York

Team	1	2	3	4	5	6	7	8	9	R	H	E
Brooklyn (N)	0	0	0	0	0	1	0	0	2	3	8	3
New York (A)	2	1	0	0	0	0	0	0	1	4	13	0
W: Allie Reynolds (1–0) L: Clem Labine (0–2)
HR: BRO – Carl Furillo (1)

== Awards and honors ==
- National League Most Valuable Player
  - Roy Campanella
- National League Rookie of the Year
  - Jim Gilliam
- TSN Player of the Year Award
  - Roy Campanella
- TSN NL Rookie of the Year Award
  - Jim Gilliam

=== All-Stars ===
- 1953 Major League Baseball All-Star Game
  - Roy Campanella, starter, catcher
  - Pee Wee Reese, starter, shortstop
  - Carl Furillo, reserve
  - Gil Hodges, reserve
  - Jackie Robinson, reserve
  - Duke Snider, reserve
- TSN Major League All-Star Team
  - Roy Campanella, catcher
  - Carl Furillo, outfield
  - Duke Snider, outfield
  - Pee Wee Reese, shortstop

== Farm system ==
Level	Team	League	Manager
AAA	Montreal Royals	International League	Walter Alston
AAA	St. Paul Saints	American Association	Clay Bryant
AA	Ft. Worth Cats	Texas League	Max Macon
AA	Mobile Bears	Southern Association	Ed Head
A	Elmira Pioneers	Eastern League	Al Brancato
A	Pueblo Dodgers	Western League	George Pfister
B	Asheville Tourists	Tri-State League	Ray Hathaway
B	Miami Sun Sox	Florida International League	Doc Alexson
B	Newport News Dodgers	Piedmont League	Stan Wasiak
C	Great Falls Electrics	Pioneer League	Lou Rochelli
C	Santa Barbara Dodgers	California League	George Scherger
D	Hornell Dodgers	Pennsylvania–Ontario–New York League	Mervin Dornburg; Jack Banta
D	Shawnee Hawks	Sooner State League	Boyd Bartley
D	Sheboygan Indians	Wisconsin State League	Joe Hauser
D	Thomasville Dodgers	Georgia–Florida League	John Angelone
D	Union City Dodgers	Kentucky–Illinois–Tennessee League	Earl Naylor

LEAGUE CHAMPIONS: Montreal
