= Paul Smith (first baseman) =

American baseball player (1931–2019)

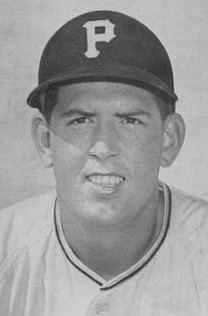
- Smith in 1957
- First baseman / Outfielder
- Born: March 19, 1931; New Castle, Pennsylvania, U.S.
- Died: August 18, 2019 (aged 88); Conroe, Texas, U.S.
- Batted: Left Threw: Left

MLB debut
- April 14, 1953, for the Pittsburgh Pirates

Last MLB appearance
- June 7, 1958, for the Chicago Cubs

MLB statistics
- Batting average: .270
- Home runs: 7
- Runs batted in: 56
- Stats at Baseball Reference

Teams
- Pittsburgh Pirates (1953, 1957–1958); Chicago Cubs (1958)

Paul Leslie Smith (March 19, 1931 – August 18, 2019) was an American professional baseball player, a first baseman and outfielder who appeared in 223 games in Major League Baseball over three seasons (1953; 1957–1958) for the Pittsburgh Pirates and Chicago Cubs.

Smith batted and threw left-handed, and stood 5 feet 9 inches (1.75 m) tall while weighing 165 pounds (75 kg). With his hometown only 50 miles (80 km) away from Pittsburgh, Smith signed with the Pirates in 1950. His finest season in MLB was his rookie campaign with the 1953 Pirates, in which he appeared in 118 games, batting .283 with 110 hits, four home runs and 44 runs batted in. After three seasons out of the Majors, he returned to Pittsburgh for 1957, playing in 81 games as a reserve outfielder. Sold to the Cubs on May 6, 1958, Smith played his last MLB game a month later and played the rest of his career at the Triple-A level, retiring after the 1963 season.

During his Major League career, he notched 152 hits in 562 at bats, including 16 doubles, seven triples and seven home runs.
