= Dick Teed =

American baseball player (1926-2014)

- Pinch hitter
- Born: March 8, 1926; Springfield, Massachusetts, U.S.
- Died: August 17, 2014 (aged 88); Newport, Rhode Island, U.S.
- Batted: Switch Threw: Right

MLB debut
- July 24, 1953, for the Brooklyn Dodgers

Last MLB appearance
- July 24, 1953, for the Brooklyn Dodgers

MLB statistics
- At bats: 1
- Hits: 0
- Strikeouts: 1
- Stats at Baseball Reference

Teams
- Brooklyn Dodgers (1953)

Richard Leroy Teed (March 8, 1926 – August 17, 2014) was an American professional baseball player, manager and scout. A catcher by trade, his playing career extended for 17 seasons between 1947 and 1965, with one-year interruptions in 1956 and 1964. However, he appeared in only one game and received a single at bat in Major League Baseball as a member of the 1953 Brooklyn Dodgers when, as a pinch hitter, he struck out.

Teed was a native of Springfield, Massachusetts, and graduated from high school in Windsor, Connecticut. He served in the United States Marine Corps during World War II in the Pacific Theater prior to his baseball career.

Teed was a switch hitter who threw right-handed and was listed as 5 feet 11 inches (1.80 m) tall and 180 pounds (82 kg). The 1953 season was his seventh in the Brooklyn organization and was spent mainly with the Mobile Bears of the Double-A Southern Association. His one-game MLB appearance happened July 24 at Ebbets Field when he batted for pitcher Jim Hughes in the seventh inning and struck out against Max Surkont of the Milwaukee Braves; Brooklyn was trailing 11–1 at the time. The Braves eventually won, 11–6.

Teed became a manager in the Philadelphia Phillies' minor league system at the Class A level in the mid-1960s and later scouted for them and the Dodgers, by then in Los Angeles. He died in Newport, Rhode Island, at age 88 on August 17, 2014.
