= Bill Antonello =

American baseball player (1927–1993)

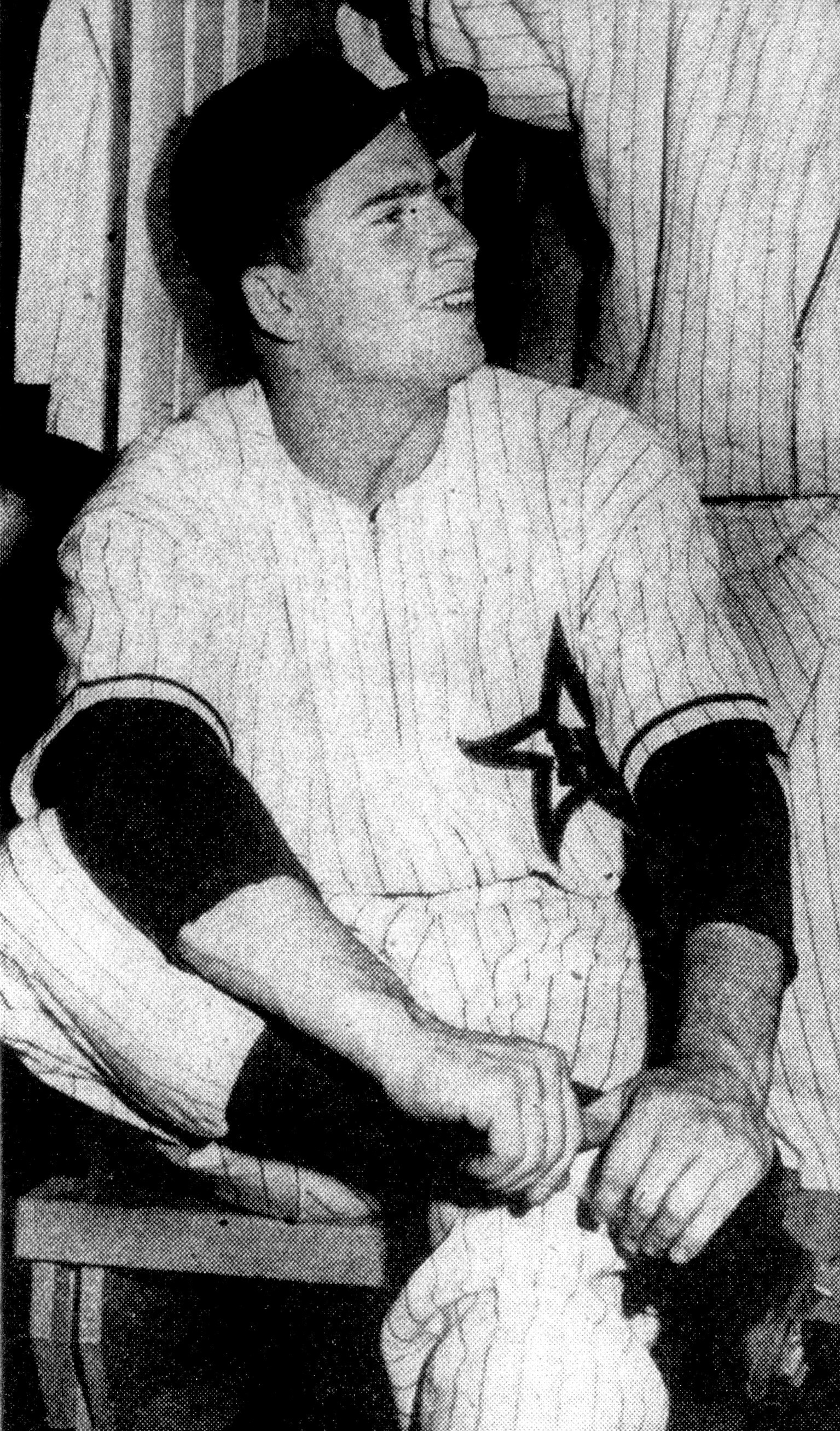
- Antonello in 1950
- Outfielder
- Born: May 19, 1927; Brooklyn, New York, U.S.
- Died: March 4, 1993 (aged 65); Fridley, Minnesota, U.S.
- Batted: Right Threw: Right

MLB debut
- April 30, 1953, for the Brooklyn Dodgers

Last MLB appearance
- September 27, 1953, for the Brooklyn Dodgers

MLB statistics
- Batting average: .163
- Home runs: 1
- Runs batted in: 4
- Stats at Baseball Reference

Teams
- Brooklyn Dodgers (1953)

William James Antonello (May 19, 1927 – March 4, 1993) was an American professional baseball player whose 12-season career included 40 games in Major League Baseball as an outfielder, pinch hitter and pinch runner for the 1953 Brooklyn Dodgers. The Brooklyn native threw and batted right-handed, stood 5 feet 11 inches (1.80 m) tall and weighed 185 pounds (84 kg).

Antonello attended Fort Hamilton High School and served in the United States Navy as a 17-year-old during World War II. He signed with the Dodgers in 1946 and spent seven full seasons in their farm system before his promotion to the 1953 edition. In his long big-league campaign, he started nine games, five of them in left field, scored nine runs, and collected seven hits and two bases on balls in 45 plate appearances. Those seven hits included one home run, hit off Ken Raffensberger of the Cincinnati Redlegs at Crosley Field on May 17. Antonello batted .163 with four runs batted in.

That year, Brooklyn captured 105 regular-season games and the National League pennant, but Antonello did not appear in the 1953 World Series, won by the New York Yankees in six games. He played professionally through the 1957 minor-league season.

Antonello settled in his wife's hometown of Arden Hills, Saint Paul, Minnesota, where he had played Triple-A baseball during the early 1950s, and died in Fridley, Minnesota, at age 65 in 1993.
