= Cliff Chambers =

American baseball pitcher (1922–2012)

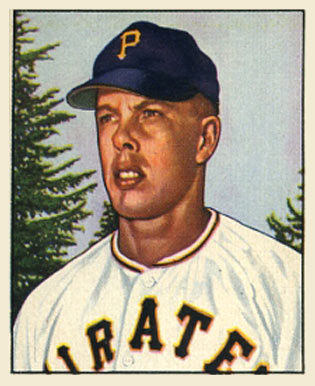
- Pitcher
- Born: January 10, 1922; Portland, Oregon, U.S.
- Died: January 21, 2012 (aged 90); Eagle, Idaho, U.S.
- Batted: Left Threw: Left

MLB debut
- April 24, 1948, for the Chicago Cubs

Last MLB appearance
- September 22, 1953, for the St. Louis Cardinals

MLB statistics
- Win–loss record: 48–53
- Earned run average: 4.29
- Strikeouts: 374
- Stats at Baseball Reference

Teams
- Chicago Cubs (1948); Pittsburgh Pirates (1949–1951); St. Louis Cardinals (1951–1953)

Career highlights and awards
- Pitched a no-hitter on May 6, 1951

Clifford Day Chambers (January 10, 1922 – January 21, 2012) was an American professional baseball pitcher who appeared in 189 games in Major League Baseball (MLB) from 1948 to 1953 for the Chicago Cubs, Pittsburgh Pirates and St. Louis Cardinals. He threw and batted left-handed, stood 6 feet 3 inches (1.91 m) tall and weighed 208 pounds (94 kg).

== Biography ==
Chambers was born in Portland, Oregon. He played two seasons of college baseball for the Washington State Cougars in 1941–42. He broke into the major leagues with the Chicago Cubs in 1948, and he was pleasantly surprised to find out that he had been traded to the Pittsburgh Pirates before the 1949 season. Chambers said that he had not been happy with his salary in Chicago, and that he was excited to play with a well-regarded organization like Pittsburgh.

Before the 1950 season, Chambers had threatened not to sign with Pittsburgh unless he made $20,000, a large increase from his $7,500 salary the year before. After Pirates general manager Roy Hamey called Chambers at his home in Bellingham, Washington, Chambers agreed to sign an extension worth less than $15,000.

On May 6, 1951, while with the Pirates, Chambers no-hit the Boston Braves 3–0 in the second game of a doubleheader at Braves Field. It was the first no-hitter by a Pirates pitcher in 44 years.

A month later, on June 15, the Pirates traded Chambers and Wally Westlake to the Cardinals for Dick Cole, Joe Garagiola, Bill Howerton, Howie Pollet and Ted Wilks. Not until Edwin Jackson in 2010 would a pitcher be traded after hurling a no-hitter earlier in the season.

Over his six MLB seasons, Chambers compiled a 48–53 career won–lost record with an earned run average of 4.29, with 37 complete games and seven shutouts in 113 starts. He allowed 924 hits and 361 bases on balls in 8971/3 innings pitched, with 374 strikeouts. He was an above-average hitter as a pitcher, posting a .235 batting average (69-for-294) with 24 runs, three home runs and 25 RBI.

== See also ==
- List of Major League Baseball no-hitters

Preceded by Vern Bickford	No-hitter pitcher May 6, 1951	Succeeded by Bob Feller
