= Fred Haney =

American baseball player, manager, and executive (1896–1977)

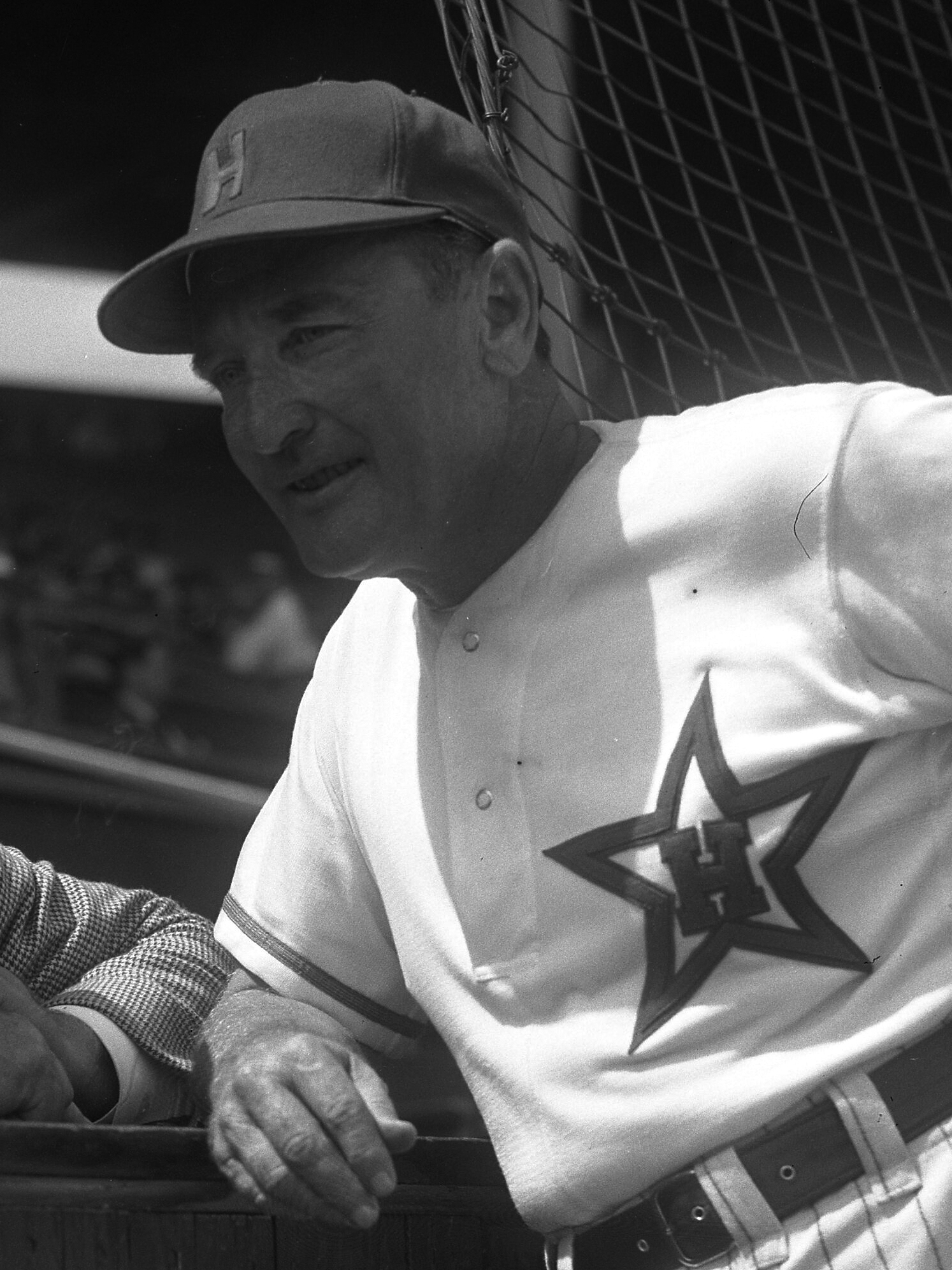
- Third baseman / Manager / General manager
- Born: April 25, 1896; Albuquerque, New Mexico Territory, U.S.
- Died: November 9, 1977 (aged 81); Beverly Hills, California, U.S.
- Batted: Right Threw: Right

MLB debut
- April 18, 1922, for the Detroit Tigers

Last MLB appearance
- May 7, 1929, for the St. Louis Cardinals

MLB statistics
- Batting average: .275
- Home runs: 8
- Runs batted in: 229
- Managerial record: 629–757
- Winning %: .454
- Stats at Baseball Reference

Teams
- As player: Detroit Tigers (1922–1925); Boston Red Sox (1926–1927); Chicago Cubs (1927); St. Louis Cardinals (1929); As manager: St. Louis Browns (1939–1941); Pittsburgh Pirates (1953–1955); Milwaukee Braves (1956–1959); As a general manager: Los Angeles/California Angels (1961–1968)

Career highlights and awards
- World Series champion (1957)

Fred Girard Haney (April 25, 1896 – November 9, 1977) was an American third baseman, manager, coach and executive in Major League Baseball (MLB). As a manager, he won two pennants and a world championship with the Milwaukee Braves. He later served as the first general manager of the expansion Los Angeles Angels in the American League. For years, Haney was one of the most popular baseball figures in Los Angeles. In 1974 he was presented with the King of Baseball award given by Minor League Baseball.

== Early life ==
Born in Albuquerque, New Mexico, and raised in Los Angeles, Haney's major league playing career lasted all or part of seven seasons (1922–27, 1929). Primarily a third baseman—despite his diminutive (5 feet 6 inches (1.68 m) size—Haney compiled a .275 batting average with eight home runs and 229 runs batted in (RBI) for the Detroit Tigers, Boston Red Sox, Chicago Cubs and St. Louis Cardinals. Much of his playing career was spent in his hometown with the city's two Pacific Coast League clubs, the original PCL Angels and the Hollywood Stars. He threw and batted right-handed.

== Managerial career ==
=== Early years and broadcasting ===
Haney became a manager in 1936, piloting the Toledo Mud Hens of the AA American Association, the top farm team of the St. Louis Browns. In 1939, he took over the lowly Browns and the team lost 111 games. They improved by 24 games in 1940, but when the 1941 Brownies dropped 32 of their first 44 contests, Haney was replaced by Luke Sewell.

After briefly returning to Toledo to manage through 1942, Haney went home to Los Angeles (and the Coast League) as the radio play-by-play broadcaster for the Hollywood Stars and Los Angeles Angels for six seasons, starting in 1943. In 1949, he moved back into the dugout as the manager of the Hollywood club. During his four years (1949–52) as manager, the Stars won two PCL pennants.

=== Milwaukee Braves ===
As a reward, Haney was named manager of the Stars' parent club: the worst team in the National League, the Pittsburgh Pirates. The Pirates rang up three last place finishes in Haney's 1953–55 tenure, losing 104, 101 and 94 games. Finally, he was given the pink slip by the Bucs, and he joined the Milwaukee Braves as a coach for 1956.

==== 1956 ====
Adversity turned into good fortune, however, when the Braves started slowly under skipper Charlie Grimm. They were 24–22 on June 17, 1956, when Grimm was fired and Haney was named the manager. Under him, Milwaukee played at a .630 clip (68–40) for the rest of the season. As late as the final series of the season, the Braves were in position to win the National League pennant. On the morning of Friday, September 28, they held a one-game lead over the Brooklyn Dodgers with three games to play. However, the Braves lost two of three against St. Louis during the season's final weekend, while Brooklyn swept the lowly Pirates three straight to escape with the NL pennant by a single game. Nevertheless, the Braves' 1956 performance secured Haney's tenure in the Beer City. He would push his team hard on fundamentals the following spring training, stating that "You're going to hate my guts next spring, but you'll love me when you see that World Series check in the fall."

During his tenure of a little more than 3 1/2 seasons, Haney would lead the Braves to their only two pennants, and lone World Series championship in 13 years of existence (1953–65) in the city. Despite his managerial success in Milwaukee, Haney had more than his share of critics who believed it was largely the result of the immense talent around him.

==== 1957 ====
In 1957, with a lineup that included future Baseball Hall of Fame members Hank Aaron, Eddie Mathews, Warren Spahn, and Red Schoendienst – and stars such as Lew Burdette, Bob Buhl, Johnny Logan and Del Crandall – the Braves won the National League pennant by eight games over the St. Louis Cardinals. During the regular season, Haney led the Braves in overcoming season-ending injuries to star first baseman Joe Adcock and fleet center fielder Bill Bruton, and slow starts to the season by two regulars, left fielder Bobby Thomson and second baseman Danny O'Connell, both of whom were traded to the New York Giants on June 15 for Schoendienst.

Then, led by Burdette's three complete-game victories in the World Series, the Braves defeated the New York Yankees in seven games – including winning the crucial seventh game 5–0 at Yankee Stadium with Burdette pitching – thus making him the World Series Most Valuable Player. Aaron received the National League Most Valuable Player award and Spahn won the lone Major League Cy Young Award (two Cy Young Awards were not given out per year until 1967).

==== 1958 ====
In 1958, Milwaukee repeated as champions in a league that was in transition, prevailing again by a margin of eight games. The core of the team was once again Aaron, Matthews, Adcock, Spahn and Burdette. However, Buhl was limited to eleven appearances because of health issues, while Adcock played in only 105 games and Wes Covington in just 90 also because of injuries. Nonetheless, in Spahn and Burdette, the team had the best starter tandem in the majors. Spahn recorded a 22–11 record in 290 innings, while Burdette posted a 20–10 mark in 275 innings. The Braves finished first in the National League with a 92–62 record and returned to the World Series.

The Yankees again won the American League, hence the two teams faced off against each other again in the World Series. The Braves roared ahead by winning three of the first four games in the series. The Yankees quickly regrouped, and they won Games 5, 6, and 7 and the championship. The final two games were played at Milwaukee County Stadium.

Many consider the turning point was Haney's controversial decision to start Burdette and Spahn on two days' rest each in the final two games, which had the appearance of a panic move, what with his team ahead 3–2 lead in the series. Some critics believe well-rested veteran Bob Rush would have been a wiser choice in Game 6, pointing to his effectiveness in the final two months of the regular season as well as in Game 3 of the series albeit it in a loss. That would have allowed Spahn, who had been victorious in his previous two starts, to open Game 7 if necessary on his accustomed three days' rest. At the same time, Burdette, who had struggled in his two starts, would have been available in the bullpen. Instead, Spahn pitched well in a 4–3, 10-inning loss in Game 6, then Burdette tired late in a 6-2 setback in the clincher.

==== 1959 ====
In 1959, the Braves were back in the thick of contention again, with the same core of regular players, and a stronger pitching staff, since Buhl came back to pitch 200 innings in 31 games, with a 15–9 record. Spahn and Burdette were brilliant, each with a 21–15 record in 290 innings pitched and a combined 41 complete games. Aaron and Matthews had prolific seasons. Aaron led the league with careers highs in 223 hits, a .355 batting average and 400 total bases. He had 39 home runs and 123 runs batted in, while leading the league in slugging percentage. Matthews paced the team with 46 home runs and batted in 114 runs.

The Braves finished in a tie with the Los Angeles Dodgers for first place, both with records of 86 wins and 68 losses. This forced the two teams into a best-of-three-games playoff. Once again, Haney bypassed Rush and others in favor of inexperienced starter Carlton Willey in Game 1, a 3–2 loss in Milwaukee. The Dodgers completed the two-game sweep the next day, 6–5, to capture the pennant in Haney's hometown of Los Angeles. A short time later, Haney, approaching the age of 61, was dismissed as Braves manager, and he was replaced by the former Dodger coach Chuck Dressen.

In his guide to baseball managers, author Bill James makes a detailed case for considering Haney's 1959 season at the helm of the Braves as the worst performance by an MLB manager. As he puts it: "Without exaggeration, the 1959 Dodgers shouldn't have been within 20 games of the Braves In reality, the two teams ended up playing a three-game playoff, which the Dodgers swept in two games. Among Haney's mistakes that season: riding his two top pitchers, Warren Spahn and Lew Burdette into the ground while ignoring a number of talented youngsters who were available to pitch; platooning Joe Adcock with the awful Frank Torre long after Torre had demonstrated he was in a year-long slump; failing to settle on a solution when second baseman Red Schoendienst was lost for the season; and loading his bench with a group of grumpy and over-the-hill veterans from which he failed to get any production."

With his other two "near misses", Haney stands as by far the most successful manager of the Braves' years in Milwaukee. His career managing record — tarnished by poor teams in St. Louis and Pittsburgh — was 629–757 (.454). He won 341 games and lost 231 (.596) with the Braves.

== Front office ==
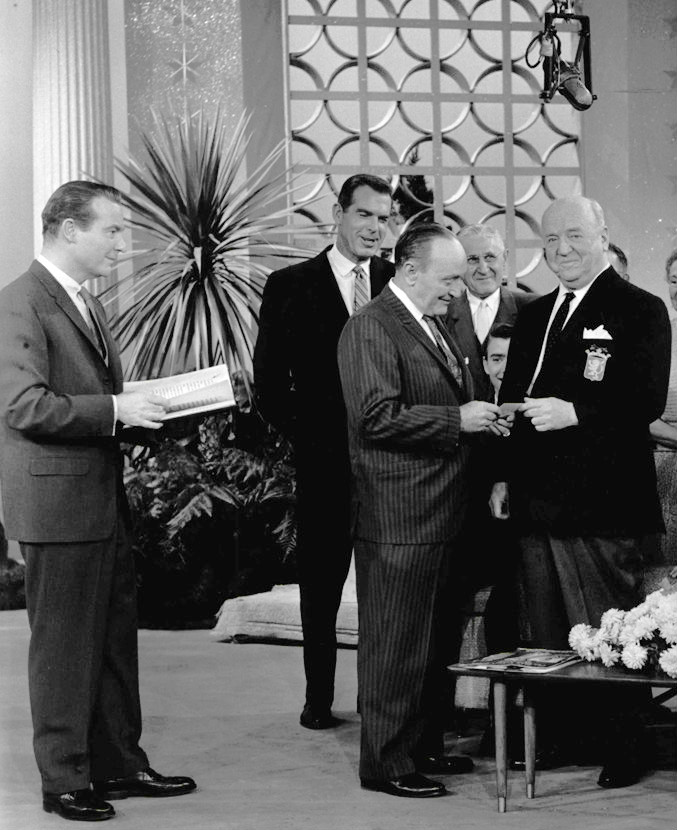
At right actor William Frawley receives from Haney a lifetime pass to Angels games during a January 1961 episode of This Is Your Life

Haney was not out of work long. In 1960 he made a brief return to broadcasting, teaming with Lindsey Nelson to call weekend baseball for NBC television. The following year, the American League granted an expansion team to Los Angeles, the Los Angeles Angels, and its owner, Gene Autry, chose Haney to operate the team and its organization for him. While the Angels usually struggled on the playing field during Haney's tenure as GM from 1961 to 1968, they did finish a surprising third in 1962, and contended for the 1967 pennant as well (the team won 70 games in their inaugural season, a record for expansion teams that still stands). Haney made the team competitive in its early years by selecting future stars such as the shortstop Jim Fregosi and the pitcher Dean Chance in the expansion draft, and acquiring sluggers such as Leon Wagner and Lee Thomas. Haney also oversaw the Angels' relocation in 1966 from Chavez Ravine down the freeway to Anaheim Stadium in Orange County, during which they changed their name to the California Angels.

Haney finished his run as GM with a winning record in half of the eight seasons he served in the position. After the 1968 baseball season (where the Angels lost 95 games, a club record until it was matched in 1980), Autry gently suggested his move into being a part-time consultant for the team, with the same salary as his previous spot but with less authority and input, and Haney gently agreed to the suggestion. He was succeeded as the team's general manager by Dick Walsh (Walsh could not mend the decline of the Angels, and he was fired after the 1971 season)

== Death ==
Haney died of a heart attack on November 9, 1977, at age 81 in Beverly Hills, California. He was interred in the Holy Cross Cemetery in Culver City, California. Two years after his death, the Angels (having won the American League West title that year), his widow Florence was asked to throw out the first pitch for Game 3 and Game 4 in the 1979 American League Championship Series. A Memorial Award was dedicated in Haney's honor for the most outstanding rookie in spring training the following year.

== Managerial record ==
Team	Year	Regular season					Postseason			
Team	Year	Games	Won	Lost	Win %	Finish	Won	Lost	Win %	Result
SLB	1939	154	43	111	.279	8th in AL	–	–	–	–
SLB	1940	154	67	87	.435	6th in AL	–	–	–	–
SLB	1941	44	15	29	.341	fired	–	–	–	–
SLB total		352	125	227	.355		0	0	–	
PIT	1953	154	50	104	.325	8th in NL	–	–	–	–
PIT	1954	154	53	101	.344	8th in NL	–	–	–	–
PIT	1955	154	60	94	.390	8th in NL	–	–	–	–
PIT total		462	163	299	.353		0	0	–	
MIL	1956	108	68	40	.630	2nd in NL	–	–	–	–
MIL	1957	154	95	59	.617	1st in NL	4	3	.571	Won World Series (NYY)
MIL	1958	154	92	62	.597	1st in NL	3	4	.429	Lost World Series (NYY)
MIL	1959	156	86	70	.551	2nd in NL	–	–	–	–
MIL total		572	341	231	.596		7	7	.500	
Total		1386	629	757	.454		7	7	.500	

Preceded by Leo Durocher	Lead color commentator, Major League Baseball on NBC; 1960	Succeeded by Joe Garagiola
