= Steve Ridzik =

American baseball player (1929–2008)

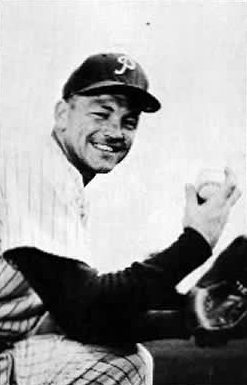
- Pitcher
- Born: April 29, 1929; Yonkers, New York, U.S.
- Died: January 8, 2008 (aged 78); Bradenton, Florida, U.S.
- Batted: Right Threw: Right

MLB debut
- September 4, 1950, for the Philadelphia Phillies

Last MLB appearance
- May 10, 1966, for the Philadelphia Phillies

MLB statistics
- Win–loss record: 39–38
- Earned run average: 3.79
- Strikeouts: 406
- Stats at Baseball Reference

Teams
- Philadelphia Phillies (1950–1955); Cincinnati Redlegs (1955); New York Giants (1956–1957); Cleveland Indians (1958); Washington Senators (1963–1965); Philadelphia Phillies (1966)

Career highlights and awards
- Member of 1950 NL pennant-winning Philadelphia Phillies

Stephen George Ridzik (April 29, 1929 – January 8, 2008) was an American right-handed pitcher in Major League Baseball who played for five teams from 1950 to 1966, primarily the Philadelphia Phillies and Washington Senators.

Born in Yonkers, New York, Ridzik was signed by the Phillies at the age of 16 and made his major league debut on September 4, 1950, pitching in relief. In 1953, Ridzik started 12 games and relieved in 30 more going 9-6 with an earned run average of 3.77. The Phillies traded him on April 30, 1955, along with Smoky Burgess and Stan Palys, to the Cincinnati Redlegs for Andy Seminick, Glen Gorbous, and Jim Greengrass. After having his contract sold to Seattle of the Pacific Coast League that same year, the New York Giants claimed him the next month in the Rule 5 draft.

Ridzik pitched for the Giants from 1957 to 1958 appearing in 56 games including 5 starts. On April 8, 1958, the Giants sold his contract to the Cleveland Indians where he would pitch in six more games before his contract was sold again to the Chicago Cubs. He would not pitch a major league game with the Cubs before his contract was sold to the Toronto Maple Leafs of the International League.

Ridzik signed with the Washington Senators three years later in 1963 after developing a knuckleball. He would appear in 132 games, mostly in relief, over the next three years for the Senators. On April 13, 1966, his contract was sold back to his original team, the Phillies. He would appear in two games with the Phillies that year before calling it a career.

After life as a baseball player, Ridzik worked in the Washington, D.C. area for a military food distributor until moving to Florida in the late 1980s. In Florida, he helped with the organizing of charity events featuring former Major League players. He also helped establish the Major League Baseball Players Alumni Association with a former Senators teammate, Chuck Hinton. He died on January 8, 2008, after fighting heart disease for several years.
