= Ben Wade =

American baseball player (1922–2002)

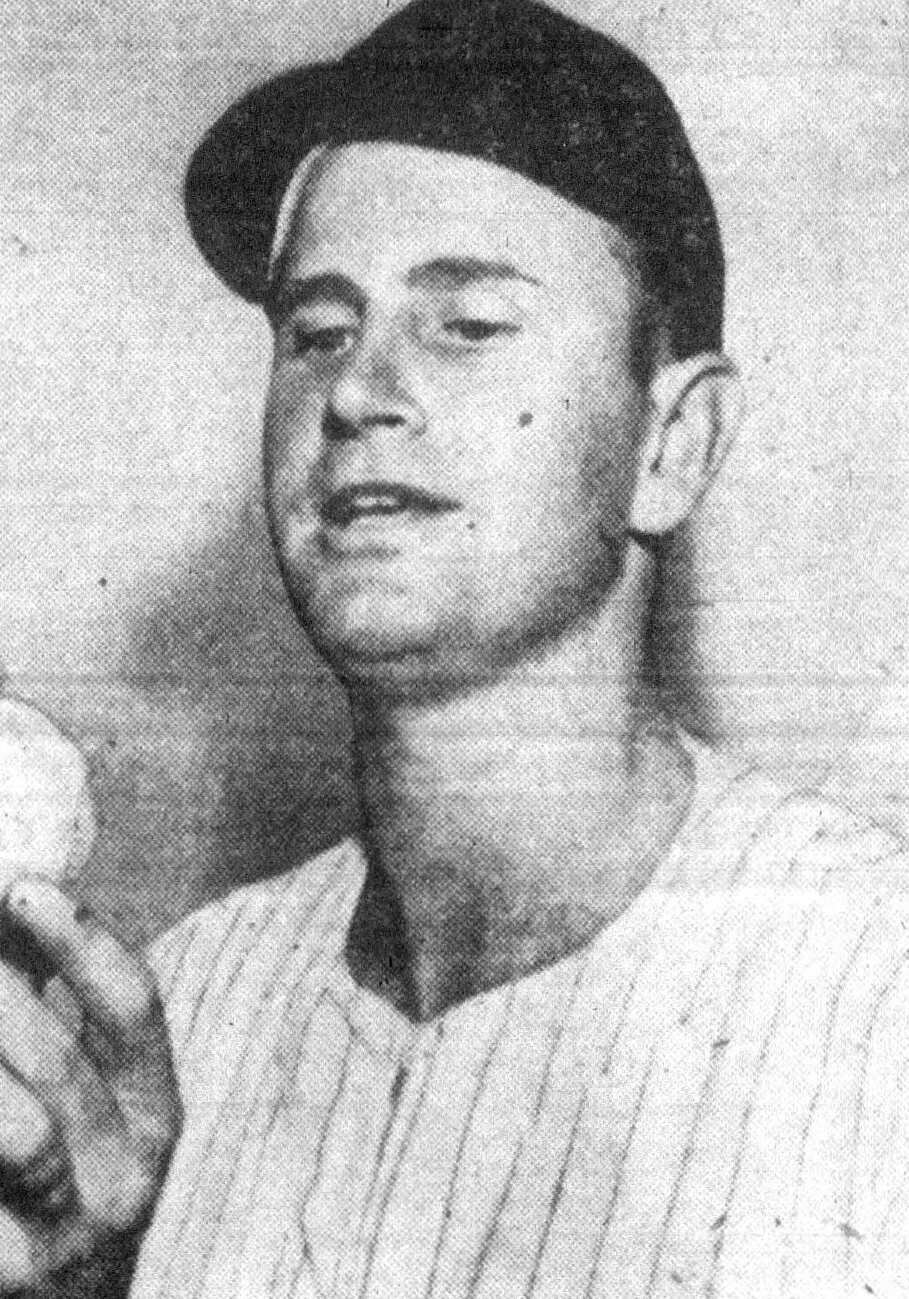
- Wade, circa 1950
- Pitcher
- Born: November 25, 1922; Morehead City, North Carolina, U.S.
- Died: December 2, 2002 (aged 80); Los Angeles, California, U.S.
- Batted: Right Threw: Right

MLB debut
- April 30, 1948, for the Chicago Cubs

Last MLB appearance
- June 12, 1955, for the Pittsburgh Pirates

MLB statistics
- Win–loss record: 19–17
- Earned run average: 4.34
- Strikeouts: 235
- Stats at Baseball Reference

Teams
- Chicago Cubs (1948); Brooklyn Dodgers (1952–1954); St. Louis Cardinals (1954); Pittsburgh Pirates (1955)

Benjamin Styron Wade (November 25, 1922 – December 2, 2002) was an American professional baseball player who became a longtime director of scouting operations for the Los Angeles Dodgers during a period that saw the team win four world championships. He played in Major League Baseball as a right-handed pitcher for the Chicago Cubs (1948), Brooklyn Dodgers (1952–54), St. Louis Cardinals (1954) and the Pittsburgh Pirates (1955). Wade batted and threw right-handed.

== Baseball career ==
Wade was born in Morehead City, North Carolina on November 25, 1922. He was signed by the Brooklyn Dodgers as an amateur free agent before the 1940 season. On February 11, 1943, Wade joined the Army Air Force. When he was discharged from military service in February 1945, he resumed playing professional baseball with the Pittsburgh Pirates minor league affiliate, the Anniston Rams of the Southeastern League. The Pirates traded Wade to the Chicago Cubs before the 1947 season.

Wade made his major league debut with the Cubs on April 30, 1948 at the age of 25. After two appearances with the Cubs, he was returned to the minor leagues. Before 1950 Season, Wade's contract was purchased from the Cubs by the Brooklyn Dodgers who promoted him back to the major leagues. He posted the best statistics of his career in 1952 with an 11-9 win–loss record and a 3.60 earned run average helping the Dodgers win the National League pennant by 4 1/2 games over the New York Giants. He also posted career-highs in games pitched (37), starts (24), complete games (5), strikeouts (118) and innings (180.0). On July 6, 1952, Wade hit two home runs off future Baseball Hall of Fame pitcher Warren Spahn and, pitched 6 innings in an 8-2 Dodgers victory. He didn't appear in the 1952 World Series as the Dodgers lost to the New York Yankees in a seven-game series.

In 1953, Wade had a 7–5 win–loss record along with a 3.79 earned run average as a relief pitcher, helping the Dodgers win their second consecutive National League pennant. In the only post-season appearance of his major league career, Wade gave up four runs in two appearances during the 1953 World Series as, the Dodgers once again lost to the New York Yankees in six games. He played in his final major league game on June 12, 1955, at the age of 32.

In a five-season major league career, Wade posted a 19–17 record with 235 strikeouts and a 4.34 ERA in 371 1/3 innings pitched. Wade also pitched 16 seasons in the minor leagues, winning 148 games and pitching over 2,000 innings for thirteen different teams.

== Scouting career ==
Wade was hired by the Dodgers as a scout in 1962 then was promoted to director of scouting in 1973. As the Dodgers director of scouting, he supplied the team with players who would lead it to eight National League championships and four World Series titles during the 1960s, 1970s and 1980s. The Dodgers earned seven Rookie Of The Year awards in a period of sixteen years starting with Rick Sutcliffe in 1979. Dodgers players drafted during Wade's tenure as scouting director included; Mike Piazza, Rick Sutcliffe, Dave Stewart, Mike Scioscia, Bob Welch, Mickey Hatcher, Steve Sax, Mike Marshall, Steve Howe, Orel Hershiser, John Franco and Eric Karros. He held the director of scouting post until his retirement after the end of the 1990 season.

Wade died of cancer at the age of 80 in Los Angeles on December 2, 2002. His older brother, Jake Wade, was also a major league pitcher.
