= Carlos Bernier =

Puerto Rican baseball player (1927–1989)

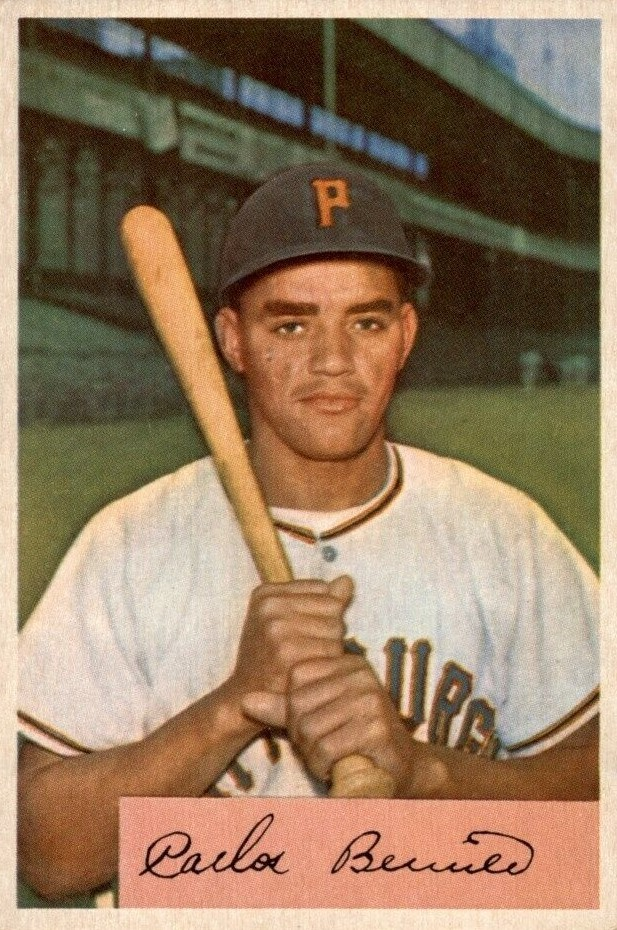
- Center fielder / Right fielder
- Born: January 28, 1927; Juana Díaz, Puerto Rico
- Died: April 6, 1989 (aged 62); Juana Díaz, Puerto Rico
- Batted: Right Threw: Right

MLB debut
- April 22, 1953, for the Pittsburgh Pirates

Last MLB appearance
- September 22, 1953, for the Pittsburgh Pirates

MLB statistics
- Batting average: .213
- Home runs: 3
- Runs batted in: 31
- Stats at Baseball Reference

Teams
- Pittsburgh Pirates (1953)

Carlos Eugene Bernier Rodríguez (January 28, 1927 – April 6, 1989) was a Puerto Rican professional baseball player who played one full season as an outfielder in Major League Baseball for the 1953 Pittsburgh Pirates. Born in Juana Díaz, Puerto Rico, he threw and batted right-handed, stood 5 feet 11 inches (1.80 m) tall and weighed 180 pounds (82 kg).

== Career ==
Bernier's professional career extended for 17 seasons (1948–1964). Carlos Bernier is the all-time leaders in at bat in the LBPPR with 4,126 and led in stolen bases from 1949 to 1953 and in the 1955-56 season, to lead that stat with 286. His 41 stolen bases in the 1949-50 season lasted as the record until 1980-81. In the LBPPR Bernier is also first with 86 triples and second in hits (1,107) and runs (739). On May 2, 1953, Bernier hit three triples in a game. He was inducted into the Puerto Rico Sports Hall of Fame in 1999 and the Pacific League Hall of Fame in 2004.

In addition to the 105 games he played for the 1953 Pirates, he appeared in an even 2,200 games in minor league baseball, with 1,725 games played at the highest levels (Triple-A and the Open Classification) then in existence. Bernier batted .298 with nearly 2,300 hits and exactly 200 home runs as a minor leaguer. In 1952, Bernier was named the PCL's Rookie of the Year by the Pacific Coast League Baseball Writers Association.

For the 1953 Pirates, Bernier collected 66 hits, including seven doubles, eight triples, and three home runs, in 310 at bats. On May 2, Bernier tied a modern major league record with three triples in a game, becoming the 15th player to perform this feat in the post-Deadball era, and the first since Ben Chapman in 1939, as well the first National League player since Lance Richbourg in 1929. In the Pacific League, Bernier had a .302 average and won the batting title in 1962 (.351).

In 1989, Bernier committed suicide by hanging. He was inducted into the Puerto Rico Sports Hall of Fame in 1999 and the Pacific League Hall of Fame in 2004.

== See also ==
- List of Major League Baseball players from Puerto Rico

== Sources ==
- Muratti Nieves, Daliana (2006). Chaguín Muratti: Un receptor del béisbol romántico puertorriqueño. Asociación de Periodistas de Puerto Rico. ISBN 1596082720.
