= Hal Rice =

American baseball player (1924–1997)

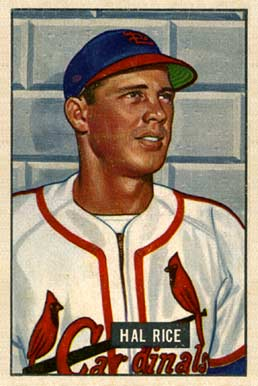
- Left fielder
- Born: February 11, 1924; Morganette, West Virginia, U.S.
- Died: December 22, 1997 (aged 73); Bloomington, Indiana, U.S.
- Batted: Left Threw: Right

MLB debut
- April 29, 1948, for the St. Louis Cardinals

Last MLB appearance
- September 19, 1954, for the Chicago Cubs

MLB statistics
- Batting average: .260
- Home runs: 19
- Runs batted in: 162
- Stats at Baseball Reference

Teams
- St. Louis Cardinals (1948–1953); Pittsburgh Pirates (1953–1954); Chicago Cubs (1954)

Harold Housten Rice (February 11, 1924 – December 22, 1997), nicknamed "Hoot", was a professional baseball left fielder in Major League Baseball from 1948 to 1954. He played for the St. Louis Cardinals, Pittsburgh Pirates, and Chicago Cubs. Most of his career was spent with the Cardinals, where he backed up Stan Musial in left field.

== Early life ==
Hal Rice was born as Harold Housten Rice on February 11, 1924, in Morganette, West Virginia, to the parents George and Bertha (Hale) Rice. He attended Ball State University, a public coeducational research university in Muncie, Indiana. Despite his future in playing major league baseball, Hal never played for The Ball State Cardinals, while he attended the school. Hal was only one of four major leaguers to never play for the BSU Cardinals but attend the school, along with Mike Dimmel, Harley Grossman, and Steve Hargan.

== Professional career ==
=== Minor League Baseball (1941-1942) (1946-1948) ===
Rice began his professional baseball career in 1941 by signing to the St. Louis Cardinals as an amateur free agent at the age of 17. His first professional team was the Williamson Red Birds, the St. Louis Cardinals class D affiliated team in Williamson, West Virginia. In 1941, Rice would end his first season in professional baseball batting .258 for the red birds. In 1942, Rice hit .349 for Williamson, prompting his promotion to the class B team, The Asheville Tourists. Rice struggled with his stint on the Tourists batting a .204 average.Despite his struggles on the tourists, his combined batting average for 1942 was a .303, ending his first stint in the minors.

In the early to mid-1940s baseball players from all across the country, joined the military to help out with the war effort after the United States became involved in World War II on December 7, 1941, because of the Japanese attack on Pearl Harbor. Much like Rice's baseball peers, he also decided to also enlist in the military, so after Rice's 1942 season, he joined the army to assist in the war effort. He served in the military for three years, 1943–1945. While in the army, Rice was a tank lieutenant in the Pacific theatre. Rice was later awarded the Purple Heart for his involvement in the war.

Rice would rejoin baseball in 1946 after his stint in the military was completed. His first year back in baseball he played on the Cardinals C-class team of that year, The Winston-Salem Cardinals, now known as the Winston-Salem Dash. His performance that year, .335 batting average, 139 singles, 21 doubles, 10 triples, caused Rice to be promoted to St. Louis's Triple A team the Rochester Red Wings for the 1947 season. Hal would then spend the 1947 season and part of the 1948 season on the Red Wings, where he ended up hitting .248 in 1947, and .321 in 146 games during the 1948 season. During his 1948 season with Rochester he got his first shot at the majors on September 25, 1948, and spent 8 games with The St. Louis Cardinals that year.

=== Major League Baseball (1948-1954) ===
At the age of 24, Rice finally got his shot in the major leagues. On September 25, 1948, Rice was called up to the Cardinals for the first time as a reserve left fielder. Rice wound up only being on the team for 8 games that year, but despite that, he managed to record a BA of .323, with 10 hits, 1 double, and 2 triples in 33 plate appearances. In 1949 Rice played 40 games for the Cardinals batting .196, with 9 hits, 2 doubles, 1 triple, and 1 homerun in 49 plate appearances, playing in left field." Due to His abysmal year in 1949, Rice was sent back down to Rochester for the majority of the 1950 season. During his stint in the minors in 1950, Rice Batted .310 in 114 games, with 128 hits, 21 doubles, 8 triples, 17 homeruns, and 79 RBIs. At some point in 1950 he would end up playing on the big league club again for 44 games, batting .211 in 139 plate appearances, with 27 hits, 3 doubles, 1 triple, 2 homeruns, and 1 RBI. In 1951, like the previous few years, Rice would again split his season playing for The Cardinals for 66 games, and the Rochester team for 54 games. Rice would end up batting .330 for Rochester and .254 for St. Louis. In 1952, for the first time since 1949, Hal Rice was not bumped to Rochester at any point during the season, and he spent the entire year on the Major League Club. Rice now 28 years old, played in a career high 98 games for the Cardinals, batting .288 with 85 hits, 14 doubles, 5 triples, 7 home runs, and 45 RBIs. Despite his great 1952 season, Hal played in only 8 games for St. Louis batting .250 before he was traded to the Pittsburgh Pirates on June 14, 1953. On June 14, 1953, Hal was traded to The Pittsburgh Pirates for longtime infielder Pete Castiglione. That year for the pirates, Rice played left field nearly day during the final 78 games of the season. In that 78 game span, he amassed a batting average of .311 and he drove in 42 runs. At the Beginning of the next season, Rice struggled mightily for the pirates hitting only .173 through the middle of June and he only played in 28 of the first 58 games. On June 14, 1954, exactly a year after being traded to the Pirates, Pittsburgh traded Hal to the Chicago Cubs for outfielder Luis Marquez. Hal's abysmal season that started in Pittsburgh continued during his stint on the cubs as he only hit for .153 for the rest of the season. The last game of that year was his last major league appearance on September 19, 1954. The final two years of Hal's baseball career were spent back down in the minor leagues. In 1955 he played on the Los Angeles Angels (PCL) with future manager Gene Mauch. That year Hal managed to hit 25 home runs in 142 games, but he only batted .262 and struck out a lot. His Home run count put him at second place on his team next to first baseman Steve Bilko. In 1956, his final year, Hal spent his time playing on the Sacramento Solons, and within the New York Yankees farm system on the Richmond Virginians, and the Denver Bears. Between the three teams he was on, his final batting average was .218 in 116 games. He never played another professional game again after the season was over.

== Legacy ==
In 1946 Rice turned in the best performance for the Rochester club that year when he drove in 9 RBIs in a game against Baltimore. Rice's 9 RBIs equaled the Rochester RBI record Shared by Ripper Collins and George Kelly.

He was the fourth Cardinals player ever to hit 2 grand slams in one season, and up until at least the late 1990s he was tied in second place with Stan Musial and other players for the most grand slams in a season.

== Final days ==
Rice retired after the 1956 season. He lived out the rest of his life between Muncie, Indiana, and St. Augustine, Florida. He died on December 22, 1997, in Bloomington, Indiana.
