= Pete Castiglione =

American baseball player (1921–2010)

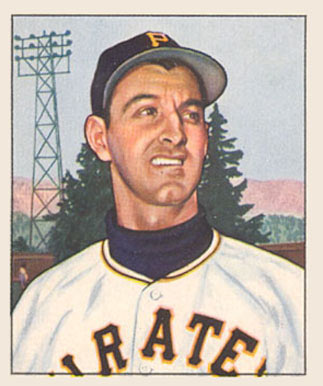
- Infielder
- Born: February 13, 1921; Greenwich, Connecticut, U.S.
- Died: April 22, 2010 (aged 89); Pompano Beach, Florida, U.S.
- Batted: Right Threw: Right

MLB debut
- September 10, 1947, for the Pittsburgh Pirates

Last MLB appearance
- April 25, 1954, for the St. Louis Cardinals

MLB statistics
- Batting average: .255
- Home runs: 24
- Runs batted in: 150
- Stats at Baseball Reference

Teams
- Pittsburgh Pirates (1947–1953); St. Louis Cardinals (1953–1954)

Peter Paul Castiglione (February 13, 1921 – April 22, 2010) was an American infielder in Major League Baseball player for eight seasons from 1947 to 1954. Born on February 13, 1921, he initially signed a baseball contract to play for the Pittsburgh Pirates out of High School, and then played three seasons in the minor leagues from 1940 to 1942, before joining the United States Navy during World War II. After the war, he returned to the Pirates' organization in 1946, joining the major league club during the 1947 season. He played for the Pirates until June 14, 1953, when he was traded to the St. Louis Cardinals for Hal Rice. Castiglione played the rest of 1953 season and the 1954 season in the Cardinals' organization. He played an additional five seasons in the minor leagues before retiring from baseball.

After his baseball career, he moved to Pompano Beach, Florida where he worked for the postal service as a letter carrier, and was active in local sporting community by refereeing and umpiring. He also scouted for the Pirates during his later years, as well as coaching High School and American Legion baseball teams. He died at the age of 89 in Pompano Beach.
