= Billy Loes =

American baseball player (1929–2010)

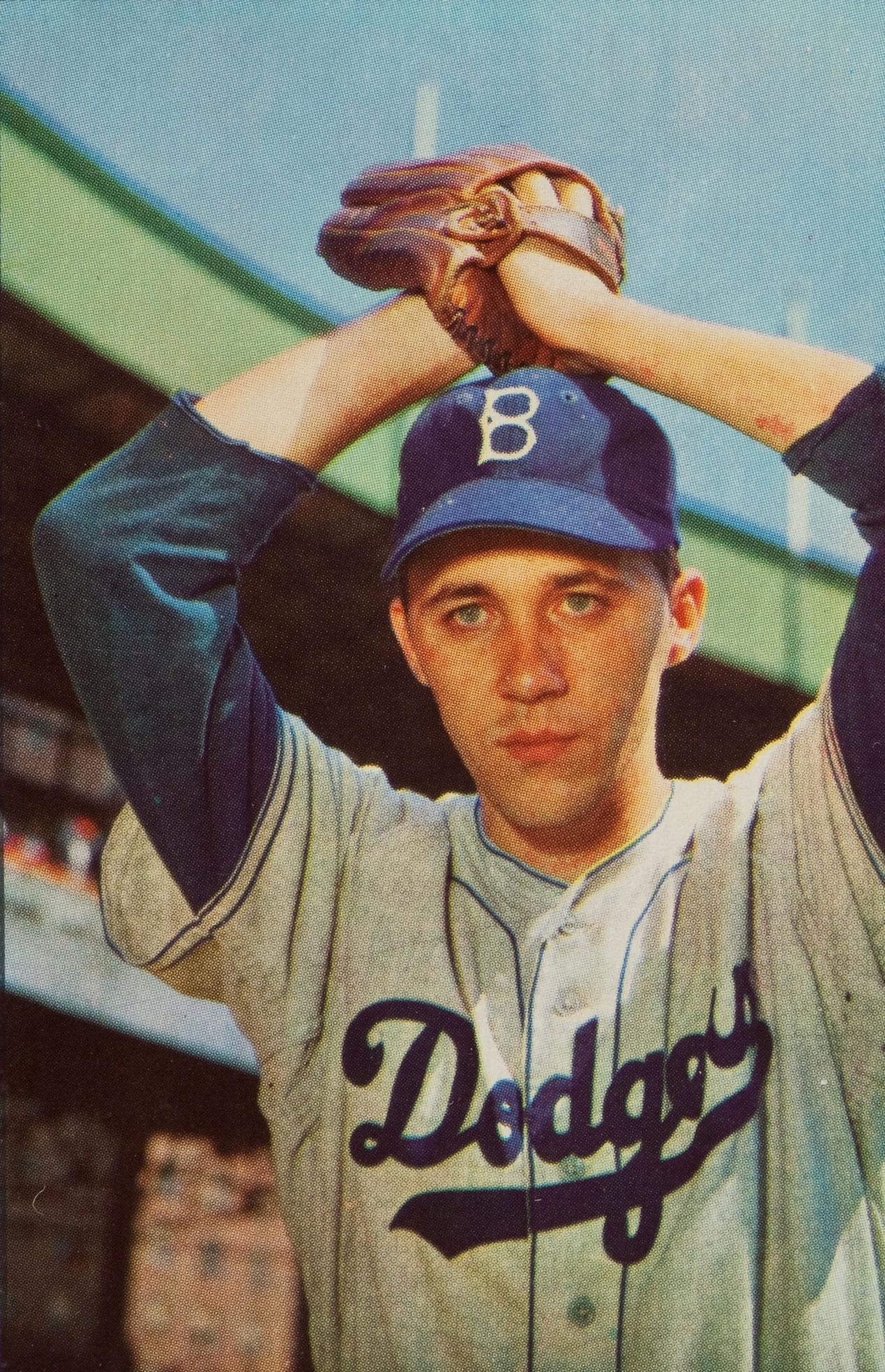
- Loes circa 1953.
- Pitcher
- Born: December 13, 1929; Long Island City, New York City, New York, U.S.
- Died: July 15, 2010 (aged 80); Tucson, Arizona, U.S.
- Batted: Right Threw: Right

MLB debut
- May 18, 1950, for the Brooklyn Dodgers

Last MLB appearance
- September 14, 1961, for the San Francisco Giants

MLB statistics
- Win–loss record: 80–63
- Earned run average: 3.89
- Strikeouts: 645
- Stats at Baseball Reference

Teams
- Brooklyn Dodgers (1950, 1952–1956); Baltimore Orioles (1956–1959); San Francisco Giants (1960–1961)

Career highlights and awards
- All-Star (1957); World Series champion (1955)

William Loes (December 13, 1929 – July 15, 2010) was an American right-handed pitcher who spent eleven seasons in Major League Baseball (MLB) with the Brooklyn Dodgers (1950, 1952–56), Baltimore Orioles (1956–59) and San Francisco Giants (1960–61). He appeared in three World Series with the Dodgers, including the only one won by the franchise when it was based in Brooklyn in 1955.

In an 11-season career, Loes posted an 80–63 record with 645 strikeouts and a 3.89 ERA in 1190.1 innings pitched. He made the American League All-Star team in 1957.

Among Major League Baseball's video archives is a television broadcast of the sixth game of the 1952 World Series, of which Loes was one of the starting pitchers. During the game, announcer Red Barber states that Loes was the son of Greek immigrants who had changed his last name. Further, says Barber, Loes would not tell Barber what his original last name was because, according to Loes, Barber would be unable to pronounce, spell or remember that name.

Loes distinguished himself in several ways in the 1952 World Series. When asked how the Dodgers would fare, he predicted the Yankees would win in seven, but was misquoted as saying the Yankees would win in six. During the sixth game, he committed a balk. In the seventh inning, he was starting his windup when the ball dropped from his hand. "Too much spit on it", he said later. Then a grounder hit by Yankee pitcher Vic Raschi bounced off his leg for a single, allowing a run to score. Afterward, he said he lost the ground ball in the sun.

Loes said that he did not want to be a 20-game winner, "because then I'd be expected to do it every year." His career high in wins came in 1953, when he went 14–8 for the pennant-winning Dodgers.
