= Paul Pettit =

American baseball player (1931–2020)

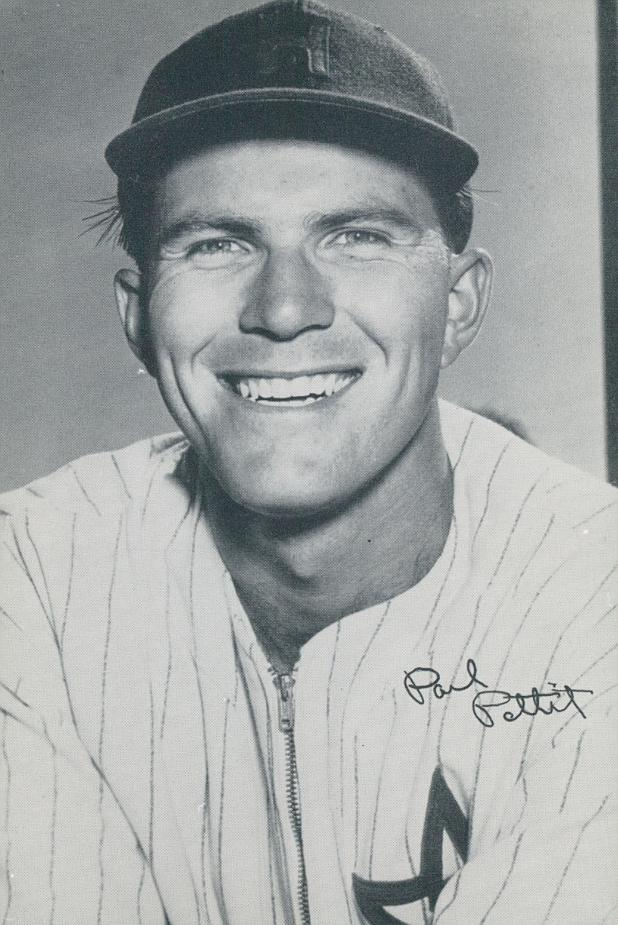
- Pettit with the Hollywood Stars c. 1957
- Pitcher
- Born: November 29, 1931; Los Angeles, California, U.S.
- Died: September 24, 2020 (aged 88); Canyon Lake, California, U.S.
- Batted: Left Threw: Left

MLB debut
- May 4, 1951, for the Pittsburgh Pirates

Last MLB appearance
- September 19, 1953, for the Pittsburgh Pirates

MLB statistics
- Win–loss record: 1–2
- Earned run average: 7.34
- Strikeouts: 14
- Stats at Baseball Reference

Teams
- Pittsburgh Pirates (1951, 1953)

George William Paul Pettit (November 29, 1931 – September 24, 2020) was an American professional baseball pitcher, who played in Major League Baseball (MLB) for the Pittsburgh Pirates in 1951 and 1953.

== Early life ==
Born and raised in Los Angeles, Pettit graduated from Narbonne H.S. in Harbor City, California. He was known as the "Wizard of Whiff." As an amateur—in high school, for the semipro Signal Oilers—he pitched six no-hitters, three of them in a row, and struck out 945 batters in 549 innings. In one 12-inning high school game, he struck out 27 batters.

In 1949, movie producer Frederick Stephani was looking to make a baseball movie but could not afford the story of an established star. Instead, Stephani scouted high school athletes with major league prospects, and eventually signed Pettit for $85,000. Upon his graduation in 1950, Pettit was signed by the Pittsburgh Pirates organization, who bought his contract from Stephani (though Stephani retained film rights), plus an additional $15,000. This $100,000 sum (equivalent to $1,338,000 in 2025) was a new record in baseball. While the bonus rule, which had been put in place to stop major-league teams from stashing players in the minor leagues, was in effect, the Pirates avoided that restriction by having Pettit sign with one of their minor-league affiliates, the New Orleans Pelicans.

== Professional career ==
Pettit started his professional career in Minor League Baseball with very high prospects, spending the remainder of the 1950 season with the Pelicans with the clear expectation that he would be brought up to the Pirates the following season.

Sent up to the Pirates in 1951, Pettit pitched 2.2 innings with a 3.38 ERA, with no decisions. Although his performance was disappointing, it is not considered to have been the result of a lack of talent or an error on the part of the scouts, but was mainly due to an arm injury.

In 1952, playing for the Hollywood Stars of the Pacific Coast League, Pettit was 15–8 with an ERA of 3.70. He also batted .320. Pettit returned to the Pirates in 1953; in 28 innings, he was 1–2, with an ERA of 7.71. As a hitter, Pettit was 2 for 8 for a batting average of .250.

At the start of the 1954 season, the arm injury became impossible to ignore. Pettit was eventually forced to give up pitching and was sent down to the Salinas Packers of the California League, where he played outfield. In 1954, he hit .324 with 20 home runs and 102 RBIs. In 1955, playing for the Azules de Veracruz of the Mexican League, he hit .382.

In 1957, Pettit returned to the Hollywood Stars, replacing future Pirate Slugger Dick Stuart. Pettit hit .284 with 20 home runs and 102 RBIs. On September 12, 1957, he had 10 RBIs against the Seattle Rainiers. By 1958, Pettit's arm problems had become so bad that he was moved to first base.

Pettit retired in 1961.

== Personal life ==
Pettit married Shirley Joan Jennings in January 1951. The couple had six children: Paul, Mark, Tim, Michael, Stephanie, and Cindy.

Pettit attended college during his baseball career, and by the time he stopped playing, earned a degree in Physical Education from Cal State Long Beach. He began teaching and coaching high school baseball in 1962. He managed the minor league Dubuque Royals in 1968, after which he returned to coaching high school baseball in Lawndale, California.

Pettit died on September 24, 2020, at the age of 88.
