= Jim Waugh =

American baseball player (1933–2010)

- Pitcher
- Born: November 25, 1933; Lancaster, Ohio, U.S.
- Died: February 16, 2010 (aged 76); Rock Hill, South Carolina, U.S.
- Batted: Right Threw: Right

MLB debut
- April 19, 1952, for the Pittsburgh Pirates

Last MLB appearance
- September 26, 1953, for the Pittsburgh Pirates

MLB statistics
- Win–loss record: 5–11
- Earned run average: 6.43
- Strikeouts: 41
- Stats at Baseball Reference

Teams
- Pittsburgh Pirates (1952–1953)

James Elden Waugh (November 25, 1933 – February 16, 2010) was an American professional baseball pitcher. The right-hander appeared in 46 career games pitched in Major League Baseball as a member of the Pittsburgh Pirates during parts of the 1952 and 1953 seasons. Born in Lancaster, Ohio, he was listed as 6 feet 3 inches (1.91 m) tall and 185 pounds (84 kg).

Waugh graduated from Lancaster High School and attended Ohio University and Ohio State University. Signed by the Pirates in 1951, he made his MLB debut in April 1952 at the age of 18 after only one minor-league season. On August 9, he won his first big-league game with a complete game, 4–3 victory over the Chicago Cubs at Forbes Field. Wins were hard to come by for both Waugh and his team; he lost the other six decisions of his rookie campaign, and the 1952 Pirates dropped 112 of their 154 games. In 1953, Waugh worked in 29 games with 11 starts and posted his second career complete-game, a 5–2 triumph over the Philadelphia Phillies at Connie Mack Stadium on August 20. His sophomore season saw him improve his won–lost record to 4–5, but his earned run average was a poor 6.48. The 1953 Pirates won only 50 games themselves.

Waugh's last MLB game came on September 26, 1953; he started against the New York Giants and was tagged with a 5–3 loss. In his 46 major-league games, including 18 starts, he won five games and lost 11, with an ERA of 6.43. In 1422/3 innings pitched, he allowed 169 hits and 88 bases on balls, recording 41 strikeouts.

Waugh's last pro season was 1956. He died in Rock Hill, South Carolina, in February 2010.
