= Bob Hall (pitcher) =

American baseball player (1923–1983)

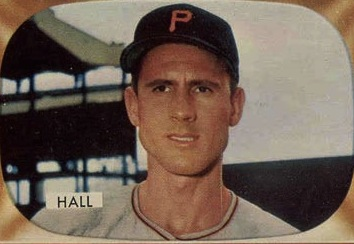
- Pitcher
- Born: December 22, 1923; Swissvale, Pennsylvania
- Died: March 12, 1983 (aged 59); St. Petersburg, Florida
- Batted: Right Threw: Right

MLB debut
- April 23, 1949, for the Boston Braves

Last MLB appearance
- September 26, 1953, for the Pittsburgh Pirates

MLB statistics
- Win–loss record: 9–18
- Earned run average: 5.40
- Strikeouts: 133
- Stats at Baseball Reference

Teams
- Boston Braves (1949–1950); Pittsburgh Pirates (1953)

Robert Louis Hall (December 22, 1923 – March 12, 1983) was a pitcher in Major League Baseball who played from 1949 through 1950 for the Boston Braves (1949–1950) and Pittsburgh Pirates (1953). Listed at 6 ft 2 in (1.88 m) and 195 lb (88 kg), Hall batted and threw right-handed. He was born in Swissvale, Pennsylvania.

In a three-season career, Hall posted a 9–18 record with a 5.40 ERA in 89 appearances, including 27 starts, one shutout, eight complete games and one save, giving up 182 runs (16 unearned) on 307 hits and 146 walks while striking out 133 in 276 2/3 innings of work.
