= Paul LaPalme =

American baseball player (1923–2010)

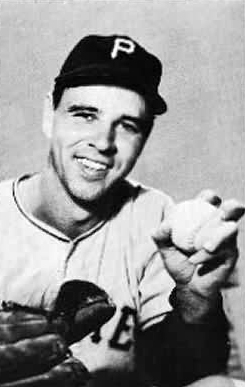
- Pitcher
- Born: December 14, 1923; Springfield, Massachusetts, U.S.
- Died: February 7, 2010 (aged 86); Leominster, Massachusetts, U.S.
- Batted: Left Threw: Left

MLB debut
- May 28, 1951, for the Pittsburgh Pirates

Last MLB appearance
- August 28, 1957, for the Chicago White Sox

MLB statistics
- Win–loss record: 24–45
- Earned run average: 4.42
- Strikeouts: 277
- Stats at Baseball Reference

Teams
- Pittsburgh Pirates (1951–1954); St. Louis Cardinals (1955–1956); Cincinnati Redlegs (1956); Chicago White Sox (1956–1957)

Paul Edmore LaPalme (December 14, 1923 – February 7, 2010) was an American professional baseball pitcher who played from 1951 through 1957 for four different teams in Major League Baseball. Listed at 5 ft 10 in (1.78 m), 184 lb (83 kg), he batted and threw left-handed.

A native of Springfield, Massachusetts, LaPalme was a knuckleball specialist. He spent 16 years in baseball, pitching seven seasons in the major leagues and 12 in the minors. He also served in the Army from 1943 to 1945 during World War II.

Nicknamed "Lefty", LaPalme started his professional career in 1941 at the age of 17, pitching for the Bristol Twins of the Appalachian League. He posted a 10–4 mark in 21 games and opened 1942 with the Erie Sailors of the Middle Atlantic League, going 12–11 with a 3.27 earned run average before joining the military. After being discharged, he returned to Bristol in 1946 and went 20–2 with 181 strikeouts and a 3.16 ERA in 27 appearances. In 1949, he ended 14–13 with a 2.90 for the Class-A Hartford Chiefs, while leading the Eastern League with 162 strikeouts.

LaPalme entered the majors in 1951 with the Pittsburgh Pirates, playing for them four years before joining the St. Louis Cardinals (1955–56), Cincinnati Redlegs (1956) and Chicago White Sox (1956–57). In his major league debut, he pitched a five-hit shutout against the Boston Braves at Braves Field; however, he finished 1–5 with a 6.29 ERA. His most productive season came in 1955, when he went 4–3 with a 2.75 ERA and three saves in 56 relief appearances. He also compiled a 4–5 record with a 2.83 ERA and nine saves for the White Sox in 1956 and 1957. Following his major league career, he pitched in the minor leagues until 1959.

In a seven-season career, LaPalme posted a 24–45 record with 277 strikeouts in 253 games, including 94 starts, one shutout, 14 saves, and 616 1/3 innings of work. In 12 minor league seasons, he went 118–68 with a 3.21 ERA in 324 games.

After retiring from baseball, LaPalme was a long-time resident of Leominster, Massachusetts. He owned a business known as LaPalme Engravers. He died at the age of 86 after a long illness.
