= Jim Hughes (1950s pitcher) =

American baseball player (1923–2001)

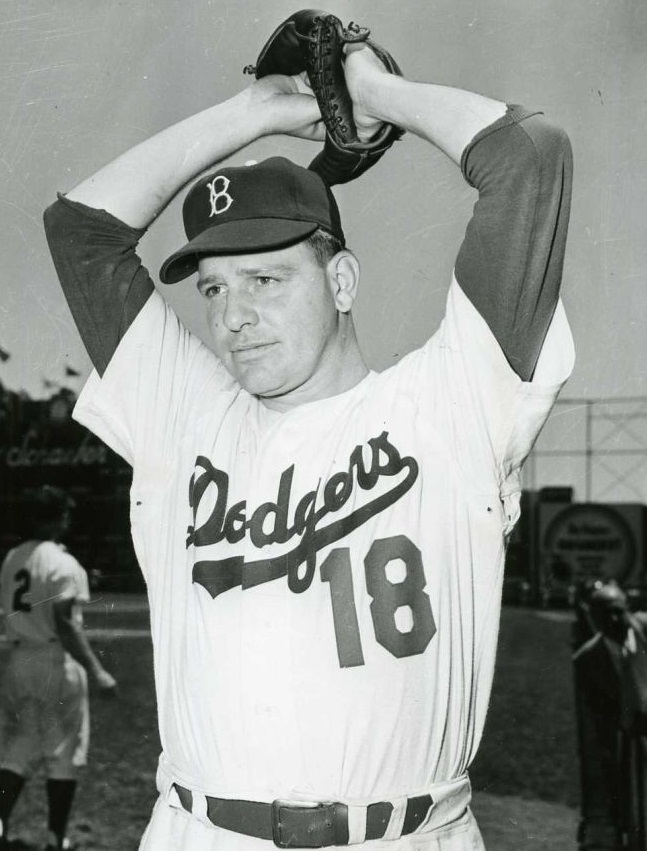
- Pitcher
- Born: March 21, 1923; Chicago, Illinois, U.S.
- Died: August 13, 2001 (aged 78); Chicago, Illinois, U.S.
- Batted: Right Threw: Right

MLB debut
- September 13, 1952, for the Brooklyn Dodgers

Last MLB appearance
- August 27, 1957, for the Chicago White Sox

MLB statistics
- Win–loss record: 15–13
- Earned run average: 3.83
- Strikeouts: 165
- Stats at Baseball Reference

Teams
- Brooklyn Dodgers (1952–1956); Chicago Cubs (1956); Chicago White Sox (1957)

James Robert Hughes (March 21, 1923 – August 13, 2001) was an American professional baseball player. The right-handed pitcher appeared in all or part of six seasons (1952–1957) in Major League Baseball with the Brooklyn Dodgers, Chicago Cubs and Chicago White Sox and worked in 172 games, all but one as a relief pitcher. In 1954, he led the National League in saves with 24 and tied for the league leadership in games pitched with 60. Hughes was a native of Chicago who was listed as 6 feet 1 inch (1.85 m) tall and 200 pounds (91 kg). His baseball career began in 1946, after he had served in the United States Marine Corps in the Pacific theatre of World War II.

Hughes was 29 years old when he made his MLB debut with six late-season appearances for Brooklyn in 1952. In 1953, he led the Dodger staff with nine saves, two more than Brooklyn relief ace Clem Labine, and in appearances (48). Then came his banner 1954 season, when he also posted an 8–4 won–lost mark in addition to his league-leading 24 saves. His performance tailed off after the 1954 season; he spent part of 1955 in the minor leagues and concluded his MLB tenure with both Chicago teams, working in 29 games for them over the 1956 and 1957 seasons.

For his MLB career, he compiled a 15–13 record and 39 saves in 172 appearances, with a 3.83 earned run average and 165 strikeouts. In 296 innings pitched, he allowed 278 hits and 152 bases on balls. He was a member of four pennant-winning Dodger teams (1952, 1953, 1955 and 1956), although he participated in only the 1953 Fall Classic. In Game 1, facing the New York Yankees, he relieved embattled starting pitcher Carl Erskine in the second inning with the Bombers already leading 4–0. Hughes kept the Dodgers in the game over the next four innings, allowing only one run on a home run to Yogi Berra and striking out three. He departed for a pinch hitter, George Shuba, who clubbed a two-run homer to bring Brooklyn within a run of the Yankees, at 5–4. In the next inning, they tied the score at five. But the Yankees rallied for four late-inning runs and won the game, 9–5. It was Hughes' only World Series appearance.

Hughes' professional baseball career ended in 1958. He died in Chicago at the age of 78.

== See also ==
- List of Major League Baseball annual saves leaders
