= Dick Cole (baseball) =

American baseball player (1926–2018)

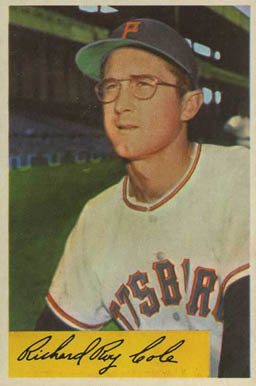
- Infielder
- Born: May 6, 1926; Long Beach, California, U.S.
- Died: October 18, 2018 (aged 92); Long Beach, California, U.S.
- Batted: Right Threw: Right

MLB debut
- April 27, 1951, for the St. Louis Cardinals

Last MLB appearance
- July 21, 1957, for the Milwaukee Braves

MLB statistics
- Batting average: .249
- Hits: 303
- Runs batted in: 107
- Stats at Baseball Reference

Teams
- St. Louis Cardinals (1951); Pittsburgh Pirates (1951, 1953–1956); Milwaukee Braves (1957)

Richard Roy Cole (May 6, 1926 – October 18, 2018) was an American Major League Baseball infielder.

Before the 1943 season, Cole was signed as an amateur free agent by the St. Louis Cardinals. Over eight years later, he made his debut with the Cardinals, but was traded after only 15 games of service to the Pittsburgh Pirates, where he would spend the majority of his career.

Cole was used at three different positions during his career, playing 169 games at shortstop, 118 games at second base, and 107 games at third.

In Cole's only full season, 1954, he grounded into 20 double plays, which was enough to tie for the second highest total in the National League with Stan Musial, only being topped by Del Ennis with 23. However, Cole hit .270, along with 22 doubles, 5 triples, and 40 RBI in 138 games. The only home run of the year he hit was off the Brooklyn Dodgers' All-Star Carl Erskine.

Cole died on October 18, 2018, at the age of 92.

== Sources ==
- Career statistics from Baseball Reference · Baseball Reference (Minors) · Retrosheet · Baseball Almanac
