= 1952 Boston Braves season =

Major League Baseball season

1952 Boston Braves
- League: National League
- Ballpark: Braves Field
- City: Boston, Massachusetts
- Record: 64–89 (.418)
- League place: 7th
- Owners: Louis R. Perini
- General managers: John J. Quinn
- Managers: Tommy Holmes, Charlie Grimm
- Television: WNAC; WBZ-TV (Jim Britt, Bump Hadley)
- Radio: WNAC (Jim Britt, Les Smith)

The 1952 Boston Braves season was the 82nd season of the franchise; the team went 64–89 (.418) and was seventh in the eight-team National League, 32 games behind the pennant-winning Brooklyn Dodgers. Home attendance for the season at Braves Field was under 282,000.

This was the final season for the franchise in Boston, Massachusetts, and the last home game at Braves Field was played on September 21. Several weeks prior to the 1953 season, the team moved to Milwaukee, Wisconsin, which was the first franchise relocation in the majors in a half century. By 1958, four other teams had moved. The Braves stayed for thirteen years in Milwaukee, and then went to Atlanta prior to the 1966 season.

== Regular season ==
=== Season standings ===
National League
| Team | W | L | Pct. | GB | Home | Road |
|---|---|---|---|---|---|---|
| Brooklyn Dodgers | 96 | 57 | .627 | — | 45‍–‍33 | 51‍–‍24 |
| New York Giants | 92 | 62 | .597 | 4½ | 50‍–‍27 | 42‍–‍35 |
| St. Louis Cardinals | 88 | 66 | .571 | 8½ | 48‍–‍29 | 40‍–‍37 |
| Philadelphia Phillies | 87 | 67 | .565 | 9½ | 47‍–‍29 | 40‍–‍38 |
| Chicago Cubs | 77 | 77 | .500 | 19½ | 42‍–‍35 | 35‍–‍42 |
| Cincinnati Reds | 69 | 85 | .448 | 27½ | 38‍–‍39 | 31‍–‍46 |
| Boston Braves | 64 | 89 | .418 | 32 | 31‍–‍45 | 33‍–‍44 |
| Pittsburgh Pirates | 42 | 112 | .273 | 54½ | 23‍–‍54 | 19‍–‍58 |

=== Record vs. opponents ===
1952 National League record Sources:
| Team | BSN | BRO | CHC | CIN | NYG | PHI | PIT | STL |
|---|---|---|---|---|---|---|---|---|
| Boston | — | 3–18–1 | 12–10 | 9–13 | 9–13 | 9–13 | 15–7–1 | 7–15 |
| Brooklyn | 18–3–1 | — | 13–9–1 | 17–5 | 8–14 | 10–12 | 19–3 | 11–11 |
| Chicago | 10–12 | 9–13–1 | — | 13–9 | 10–12 | 10–12 | 14–8 | 11–11 |
| Cincinnati | 13–9 | 5–17 | 9–13 | — | 6–16 | 10–12 | 16–6 | 10–12 |
| New York | 13–9 | 14–8 | 12–10 | 16–6 | — | 10–12 | 15–7 | 12–10 |
| Philadelphia | 13–9 | 12–10 | 12–10 | 12–10 | 12–10 | — | 16–6 | 10–12 |
| Pittsburgh | 7–15–1 | 3–19 | 8–14 | 6–16 | 7–15 | 6–16 | — | 5–17 |
| St. Louis | 15–7 | 11–11 | 11–11 | 12–10 | 10–12 | 12–10 | 17–5 | — |

=== Roster ===
1952 Boston Braves
Roster
| Pitchers: 24 Vern Bickford; 33 Lew Burdette; 16 Bob Chipman; 29,30 Dave Cole; 56 Gene Conley; 20 Dick Donovan; 30 Dick Hoover; 22 Virgil Jester; 32 Ernie Johnson; 11 Sheldon Jones; 21 Warren Spahn; 36 Max Surkont; 22 Bert Thiel; 19 Jim Wilson | Catchers: 14 Paul Burris; 39 Walker Cooper; 42 Ebba St. Claire; Infielders: 40,44 Buzz Clarkson; 37 George Crowe; 10 Jack Cusick; 6 Jack Dittmer; 12 Roy Hartsfield; 2 Billy Klaus; 23 Johnny Logan; 41 Eddie Mathews; 6 Billy Reed; 13 Sibby Sisti; 9 Earl Torgeson | Outfielders: 7 Jack Daniels; 4 Sid Gordon; 5 Sam Jethroe; 27 Willard Marshall; 18 Bob Thorpe; 8 Pete Whisenant | Manager: 40 Charlie Grimm; 1 Tommy Holmes; Coaches: 28 Johnny Cooney; 35 Bob Keely; 31 Bucky Walters |

== Player stats ==
| = Indicates team leader |

=== Batting ===
==== Starters by position ====
Note: Pos = Position; G = Games played; AB = At bats; H = Hits; Avg. = Batting average; HR = Home runs; RBI = Runs batted in

| Pos | Player | G | AB | H | Avg. | HR | RBI |
|---|---|---|---|---|---|---|---|
| C | Walker Cooper | 102 | 349 | 82 | .235 | 10 | 55 |
| 1B | Earl Torgeson | 122 | 382 | 88 | .230 | 5 | 34 |
| 2B | Jack Dittmer | 93 | 326 | 63 | .193 | 7 | 41 |
| SS | Johnny Logan | 117 | 456 | 129 | .283 | 4 | 42 |
| 3B | Eddie Mathews | 145 | 528 | 128 | .242 | 25 | 58 |
| OF | Sid Gordon | 144 | 522 | 151 | .289 | 25 | 75 |
| OF | Bob Thorpe | 81 | 292 | 76 | .260 | 3 | 26 |
| OF | Sam Jethroe | 151 | 608 | 141 | .232 | 13 | 58 |

==== Other batters ====
Note: G = Games played; AB = At bats; H = Hits; Avg. = Batting average; HR = Home runs; RBI = Runs batted in

| Player | G | AB | H | Avg. | HR | RBI |
|---|---|---|---|---|---|---|
| Sibby Sisti | 90 | 245 | 52 | .212 | 4 | 24 |
| Jack Daniels | 106 | 219 | 41 | .187 | 2 | 14 |
| George Crowe | 73 | 217 | 56 | .258 | 4 | 20 |
| Paul Burris | 55 | 168 | 37 | .220 | 2 | 21 |
| Ebba St. Claire | 39 | 108 | 23 | .213 | 2 | 4 |
| Roy Hartsfield | 38 | 107 | 28 | .262 | 0 | 4 |
| Jack Cusick | 49 | 78 | 13 | .167 | 0 | 6 |
| Willard Marshall | 21 | 66 | 15 | .227 | 2 | 11 |
| Pete Whisenant | 24 | 52 | 10 | .192 | 0 | 7 |
| Billy Reed | 15 | 52 | 13 | .250 | 0 | 0 |
| Buzz Clarkson | 14 | 25 | 5 | .200 | 0 | 1 |
| Billy Klaus | 7 | 4 | 0 | .000 | 0 | 0 |

=== Pitching ===
| = Indicates league leader |

==== Starting pitchers ====
Note: G = Games pitched; IP = Innings pitched; W = Wins; L = Losses; ERA = Earned run average; SO = Strikeouts

| Player | G | IP | W | L | ERA | SO |
|---|---|---|---|---|---|---|
| Warren Spahn | 40 | 290.0 | 14 | 19 | 2.98 | 183 |
| Jim Wilson | 33 | 234.0 | 12 | 14 | 4.23 | 104 |
| Max Surkont | 31 | 215.0 | 12 | 13 | 3.77 | 125 |
| Vern Bickford | 26 | 161.1 | 7 | 12 | 3.74 | 62 |

==== Other pitchers ====
Note: G = Games pitched; IP = Innings pitched; W = Wins; L = Losses; ERA = Earned run average; SO = Strikeouts

| Player | G | IP | W | L | ERA | SO |
|---|---|---|---|---|---|---|
| Ernie Johnson Sr. | 29 | 92.0 | 6 | 3 | 4.11 | 45 |
| Virgil Jester | 19 | 73.0 | 3 | 5 | 3.33 | 25 |
| Dick Donovan | 7 | 13.0 | 0 | 2 | 5.54 | 6 |
| Gene Conley | 4 | 12.2 | 0 | 3 | 7.82 | 6 |

==== Relief pitchers ====
Note: G = Games pitched; W = Wins; L = Losses; SV = Saves; ERA = Earned run average; SO = Strikeouts

| Player | G | W | L | SV | ERA | SO |
|---|---|---|---|---|---|---|
| Lew Burdette | 47 | 6 | 11 | 7 | 3.61 | 47 |
| Sheldon Jones | 39 | 1 | 4 | 1 | 4.76 | 40 |
| Bob Chipman | 29 | 1 | 1 | 0 | 2.81 | 16 |
| Dave Cole | 22 | 1 | 1 | 0 | 4.03 | 22 |
| Bert Thiel | 4 | 1 | 1 | 0 | 7.71 | 6 |
| Dick Hoover | 2 | 0 | 0 | 0 | 7.71 | 0 |

== Awards and honors ==
All-Star Game

- Warren Spahn, Pitcher, Reserve

== Farm system ==
| Level | Team | League | Manager |
|---|---|---|---|
| AAA | Milwaukee Brewers | American Association | Charlie Grimm, Red Smith and Bucky Walters |
| AA | Atlanta Crackers | Southern Association | Dixie Walker |
| A | Hartford Chiefs | Eastern League | Del Bissonette |
| B | Wichita Falls Spudders | Big State League | Frank Mancuso |
| B | Evansville Braves | Illinois–Indiana–Iowa League | Bob Coleman |
| B | Hagerstown Braves | Interstate League | Dutch Dorman |
| C | Ventura Braves | California League | Bobby Sturgeon and Jose Perez |
| C | Eau Claire Bears | Northern League | Bill Adair |
| C | Quebec Braves | Provincial League | George McQuinn |
| D | Welch Miners | Appalachian League | Jack Crosswhite |
| D | Danville Dans | Mississippi–Ohio Valley League | Virl Minnis |
| D | Harlan Smokies | Mountain States League | Rex Carr |
| D | Appleton Papermakers | Wisconsin State League | Travis Jackson |

LEAGUE CHAMPIONS: Hagerstown, Quebec, Harlan
