= 1953 Milwaukee Braves season =

Major League Baseball season

1953 Milwaukee Braves
- League: National League
- Ballpark: Milwaukee County Stadium
- City: Milwaukee, Wisconsin
- Record: 92–62 (.597)
- League place: 2nd
- Owners: Louis R. Perini
- General managers: John J. Quinn
- Managers: Charlie Grimm
- Radio: WEMP; WTMJ (Earl Gillespie, Bob Kelly)

The 1953 Milwaukee Braves season was the 83rd season of the franchise. It saw the return of Major League Baseball to Milwaukee for the first time since 1901 when Braves team owner Lou Perini, due to very low attendance, moved the team to Milwaukee, Wisconsin. This move was approved by all seven fellow National League owners and occurred during spring training, just weeks prior to the start of the season.

In their first season in Wisconsin, the Braves finished in second place in the National League standings, with a 92–62 (.597) record, thirteen games behind the NL Champion Brooklyn Dodgers.

At the new County Stadium, the Braves drew a then-NL record 1.82 million fans. The previous year in Boston, the home attendance for the season was under 282,000.

== Move of Braves from Boston to Milwaukee ==
Construction began on Milwaukee County Stadium in 1950 in hopes of both luring a Major League baseball team, as well as the Green Bay Packers of the National Football League. The minor league Milwaukee Brewers were scheduled to begin play at the start of the 1953 season.

However, in the first move of a Major League team in half a century, on March 18, 1953, the National League approved owner Lou Perini's move of the Braves to Milwaukee 8–0 because of his "fine standing" with the other owners and also because there was an open city for his minor league team then in Milwaukee. The minor league Brewers moved to Toledo, Ohio, and changed their name to the Mudhens. The full AP quote about fine standing: "Warren Giles, National League president, repeated again and again that 'Perini's fine standing with the other club owners was the most important reason for their approval.'"

Braves manager Charlie Grimm had won two minor league pennants while in Milwaukee (one with the Cubs farm team and the second with the Braves farm team in 1951). In addition, the Braves organization promoted him from their Milwaukee farm team to the MLB Boston Braves the summer of 1952. Furthermore, 21 of 40 players on the Braves' starting roster had played at least some of their minor league careers in Milwaukee.

Milwaukee County gave the Braves a favorable stadium deal. For the first two years, the team would pay only $1,000 a year for the use of Milwaukee County Stadium. For the next three years, the team would pay 5% of ticket prices and concessions. After that, the rent would be negotiated afresh, with the Braves being required to open their books.

At the time of the move, the Braves owner Lou Perini said, "A third major league is the only answer for the future." This did not come to pass. In spite of the Mexican League attracting some MLB players in the 1940s, as of today, professional baseball in the United States comprises only two major leagues: the National League and the American League.

== Regular season ==
=== Season standings ===
National League
Team	W	L	Pct.	GB	Home	Road
Brooklyn Dodgers	105	49	.682	—	60‍–‍17	45‍–‍32
Milwaukee Braves	92	62	.597	13	45‍–‍31	47‍–‍31
Philadelphia Phillies	83	71	.539	22	48‍–‍29	35‍–‍42
St. Louis Cardinals	83	71	.539	22	48‍–‍30	35‍–‍41
New York Giants	70	84	.455	35	38‍–‍39	32‍–‍45
Cincinnati Redlegs	68	86	.442	37	38‍–‍39	30‍–‍47
Chicago Cubs	65	89	.422	40	43‍–‍34	22‍–‍55
Pittsburgh Pirates	50	104	.325	55	26‍–‍51	24‍–‍53

=== Opening game ===
The Braves moved from Boston to Milwaukee on March 18, 1953, less than four weeks before the start of the regular season, causing the National League to quickly realign its 1953 schedule. Before 1953, the NL was divided into four Eastern teams (Boston, Brooklyn, New York, Philadelphia) and four "Western" ones (Chicago, Cincinnati, Pittsburgh, St. Louis). With the Milwaukee Braves now a Western club, they exchanged 1953 schedules with the Pittsburgh Pirates, and opened their season on the road against the Cincinnati Redlegs in the traditional NL opener at Crosley Field on Monday, April 13. Braves' starting pitcher Max Surkont threw a three-hit shutout, however, and Sid Gordon and Jack Dittmer drove in the only runs of the day, as Milwaukee triumphed, 2–0. The following day, April 14, they opened at home before 34,357 fans, and in ten innings they defeated the St. Louis Cardinals at Milwaukee County Stadium, 3–2. Warren Spahn earned the complete game victory.

==== Starting lineup, April 13, 1953 ====
38	Bill Bruton	CF
23	Johnny Logan	SS
41	Eddie Mathews	3B
4	Sid Gordon	LF
48	Andy Pafko	RF
9	Joe Adcock	1B
1	Del Crandall	C
6	Jack Dittmer	2B
36	Max Surkont	P

=== Record vs. opponents ===
1953 National League record Sources:
Team	BRO	CHC	CIN	MIL	NYG	PHI	PIT	STL
Brooklyn	—	13–9–1	15–7	13–9	15–7	14–8	20–2	15–7
Chicago	9–13–1	—	12–10	8–14	9–13	5–17	11–11	11–11
Cincinnati	7–15	10–12	—	8–14	9–13	12–10	15–7	7–15–1
Milwaukee	9–13	14–8	14–8	—	14–8–1	13–9–1	15–7	13–9–1
New York	7–15	13–9	13–9	8–14–1	—	9–13	11–11	9–13
Philadelphia	8–14	17–5	10–12	9–13–1	13–9	—	15–7	11–11–1
Pittsburgh	2–20	11–11	7–15	7–15	11–11	7–15	—	5–17
St. Louis	7–15	11–11	15–7–1	9–13–1	13–9	11–11–1	17–5	—

=== Roster ===
1953 Milwaukee Braves
Roster
Pitchers: 34 Johnny Antonelli; 24 Vern Bickford; 10 Bob Buhl; 33 Lew Burdette; 30 Dave Cole; 47 Joey Jay; 20 Dick Donovan; 22 Virgil Jester; 32 Ernie Johnson; 16 Dave Jolly; 15,43 Don Liddle; 21 Warren Spahn; 36 Max Surkont; 19 Jim Wilson	Catchers: 14 Paul Burris; 39 Walker Cooper; 1 Del Crandall; 42 Ebba St. Claire; Infielders: 9 Joe Adcock; 37 George Crowe; 6 Jack Dittmer; 2 Harry Hanebrink; 23 Johnny Logan; 41 Eddie Mathews; 14 Mel Roach; 13 Sibby Sisti	Outfielders: 38 Bill Bruton; 4 Sid Gordon; 48 Andy Pafko; 3 Jim Pendleton; 18 Bob Thorpe; Other batters: 2 Billy Klaus	Manager: 40 Charlie Grimm; Coaches: 28 Johnny Cooney; 35 Bob Keely; 31 Bucky Walters

== Player stats ==
= Indicates team leader

= Indicates league leader

=== Batting ===
==== Starters by position ====
Note: Pos = Position; G = Games played; AB = At bats; H = Hits; Avg. = Batting average; HR = Home runs; RBI = Runs batted in; SB = Stolen bases

Pos	Player	G	AB	H	Avg.	HR	RBI	SB
C	Del Crandall	116	382	104	.272	15	51	2
1B	Joe Adcock	157	590	168	.285	18	80	3
2B	Jack Dittmer	138	504	134	.266	9	63	1
SS	Johnny Logan	150	611	167	.273	11	73	2
3B	Eddie Mathews	157	579	175	.302	47	135	1
OF	Sid Gordon	140	464	127	.274	19	75	1
OF	Andy Pafko	140	516	153	.297	17	72	2
OF	Bill Bruton	151	613	153	.250	1	41	26

==== Other batters ====
Note: G = Games played; AB = At bats; H = Hits; Avg. = Batting average; HR = Home runs; RBI = Runs batted in

Player	G	AB	H	Avg.	HR	RBI
Jim Pendleton	120	251	75	.299	7	27
Walker Cooper	53	137	30	.219	3	16
Harry Hanebrink	51	80	19	.238	1	8
Ebba St. Claire	33	80	16	.200	2	5
George Crowe	47	42	12	.286	2	6
Bob Thorpe	27	37	6	.162	0	5
Sibby Sisti	38	23	5	.217	0	4
Mel Roach	5	2	0	.000	0	0
Billy Klaus	2	2	0	.000	0	1
Paul Burris	2	1	0	.000	0	0

=== Pitching ===
==== Starting pitchers ====
Note: G = Games pitched; IP = Innings pitched; W = Wins; L = Losses; ERA = Earned run average; SO = Strikeouts

Player	G	IP	W	L	ERA	SO
Warren Spahn	35	265.2	23*	7	2.10	148
Johnny Antonelli	31	175.1	12	12	3.18	131
Max Surkont	28	170.0	11	5	4.18	83
Jim Wilson	20	114.0	4	9	4.34	71

- Tied with Robin Roberts (PHI) for league lead

==== Other pitchers ====
Note: G = Games pitched; IP = Innings pitched; W = Wins; L = Losses; ERA = Earned run average; SO = Strikeouts

Player	G	IP	W	L	ERA	SO
Lew Burdette	46	175.0	15	5	3.24	58
Bob Buhl	30	154.1	13	9	2.97	83
Don Liddle	31	128.2	7	6	3.08	63
Vern Bickford	20	58.0	2	5	5.28	25
Joey Jay	3	10.0	1	0	0.00	4

==== Relief pitchers ====
Note: G = Games pitched; W = Wins; L = Losses; SV = Saves; ERA = Earned run average; SO = Strikeouts

Player	G	W	L	SV	ERA	SO
Ernie Johnson	36	4	3	0	2.67	36
Dave Jolly	24	0	1	0	3.52	23
Dave Cole	10	0	1	0	8.59	13
Virgil Jester	2	0	0	0	22.50	0

== Awards and honors ==
- Sporting News NL Pitcher of the Year - Warren Spahn
- Sporting News Executive of the Year - Lou Perini

All-Star Game

- Warren Spahn, Pitcher, Reserve

== Farm system ==
Level	Team	League	Manager
AAA	Toledo Sox	American Association	Tommy Holmes and George Selkirk
AA	Atlanta Crackers	Southern Association	Gene Mauch
A	Jacksonville Braves	Sally League	Ben Geraghty
A	Lincoln Chiefs	Western League	Lou Finney and Walt Linden
B	Wichita Falls Spudders	Big State League	Whitey Wietelmann
B	Evansville Braves	Illinois–Indiana–Iowa League	Bob Coleman
B	Hagerstown Braves	Piedmont League	Dutch Dorman, Jimmy Zinn and Billy Jurges
C	Modesto Reds	California League	Guy Fletcher
C	Eau Claire Bears	Northern League	Rex Carr
C	Quebec Braves	Provincial League	George McQuinn
D	Sandersville Wacos	Georgia State League	Gabby Grant, Parnell Ruark, Lucius Morgan and Julian Morgan
D	Wellsville Braves	PONY League	Ted Sepkowski
D	Appleton Papermakers	Wisconsin State League	Travis Jackson

LEAGUE CHAMPIONS: Wichita Falls, Quebec
