= Bert Thiel =

American baseball player (1926–2020)

- Pitcher
- Born: May 4, 1926; Marion, Wisconsin, U.S.
- Died: July 31, 2020 (aged 94); Pella, Wisconsin, U.S.
- Batted: Right Threw: Right

MLB debut
- April 17, 1952, for the Boston Braves

Last MLB appearance
- April 30, 1952, for the Boston Braves

MLB statistics
- Win–loss record: 1–1
- Earned run average: 7.71
- Innings pitched: 7
- Strikeouts: 6
- Stats at Baseball Reference

Teams
- Boston Braves (1952)

Maynard Bert Thiel (May 4, 1926 – July 31, 2020) was an American professional baseball pitcher, manager and scout. He appeared in only four Major League games as a relief pitcher for the 1952 Boston Braves, but fashioned a 14-year playing career in the minor leagues (1947–59; 1961). Born in Marion, Wisconsin, he threw and batted right-handed, and stood 5 ft 10 in (1.78 m) tall and weighed 185 lb (84 kg).

Thiel's MLB trial occurred at the outset of the 1952 season. He split two decisions, allowed 11 hits, four bases on balls and six earned runs, and compiled an earned run average of 7.71 over seven innings pitched. He struck out six. He earned his victory in relief on April 19 at Shibe Park. Entering the game in the seventh inning with Boston trailing 7–6, Thiel hurled two scoreless innings, allowing only one hit and one walk to hold the opposition Philadelphia Phillies at bay until he exited in the top of the ninth for a pinch hitter, Jack Daniels, whose single ignited a three-runs Braves' rally. Boston forged ahead 9–7; Lew Burdette came on for the save, and Thiel had secured his first and only MLB win.

As a minor league hurler, however, Thiel won 145 games and lost 108 for a .563 winning percentage and compiled an earned run average of 3.76. He had one 20-win season, and enjoyed 18, 16, 15 and 14 game-winning seasons during a career spent in the farm systems of the Braves, New York and San Francisco Giants, and Boston Red Sox.

Thiel managed in the Kansas City Athletics and Chicago White Sox organizations, and scouted for the Washington Senators, Braves and ChiSox after his playing career. Thiel died at home on July 31, 2020, at the age of 94.
