= Milwaukee Brewers (1902–1952) =

- 1902–1952; Milwaukee, Wisconsin

Team logo	Cap insignia

Minor league affiliations
- Class: Triple-A (1946–1952); Double-A (1908–1945); Class A (1902–1907)
- League: American Association (1902–1952)

Major league affiliations
- Team: Boston Braves (1947–1952); St. Louis Browns (1929–1933); Independent (1902-1928, 1934-1946)

Minor league titles
- Class titles (5): 1913; 1914; 1936; 1947; 1951
- League titles (5): 1913; 1914; 1936; 1947; 1951

Team data
- Name: Milwaukee Brewers (1902–1952)
- Ballpark: Borchert Field (1902–1952)

The Milwaukee Brewers were a minor league baseball team based in Milwaukee, Wisconsin. They played in the American Association from 1902 through 1952. The 1944 and 1952 Brewers were recognized as being among the 100 greatest minor league teams of all time.

== Franchise history ==
=== A Milwaukee tradition ===
The nickname "Brewers" has been used by baseball teams since at least the 1880s, although none of the early clubs ever enjoyed a measure of success or stability. That would change with Milwaukee's entry into the American Association, which would last 50 years and provide the city's springboard into the major leagues.

=== American Association ===
The American Association Milwaukee Brewers were founded in 1902, after the American League Brewers moved to St. Louis and became the St. Louis Browns. The Brewers were an independent club except for 1929-1933, when they were owned by Phil Ball as an affiliate of his St. Louis Browns, and from October 1946 through their final days, when Lou Perini owned the club and operated the Brewers as the AAA-affiliate of the Boston Braves.

The Brewers won their first American Association championship in 1913 and repeated the next year. More than 20 years passed before they claimed another with a 90–64 (.584) club in 1936. In 1943–1945, the team won three consecutive pennants, and after the following season the Brewers were purchased by the Boston Braves, and became their Triple-A affiliate for six seasons (1947–1952). Although this move eventually paved the way for the team's demise, in the short run it led directly to Milwaukee's final two league championships—one in 1951 when they also won the Junior World Series, followed by an even better team the next year.

=== Bill Veeck and Jolly Cholly ===
In 1941, the club was purchased by Bill Veeck (son of former Chicago Cubs president William Veeck, Sr.) in a partnership with former Cubs star Charlie Grimm. Under Veeck's ownership, the Brewers would become one of the most colorful squads in baseball and Veeck would become one of the game's premiere showmen. Constantly creating new promotional gimmicks, Veeck gave away live animals, scheduled morning games for wartime night shift workers, staged weddings at home plate, and even sent Grimm a birthday cake containing a much-needed left-handed pitcher.

When Grimm was hired as the manager of the Cubs, he recommended that Casey Stengel be hired to replace him. Veeck was opposed to the idea – Stengel had little success in his previous managerial stints with the Dodgers and Braves – but as Veeck was stationed overseas in the Marine Corps, Grimm won out. The club won the American Association pennant in 1944, and Stengel's managerial career was resurrected.

After three consecutive pennants, Veeck sold his interest in the Brewers after the 1945 season for a $275,000 profit.

Grimm returned to Milwaukee twice more during the early 1950s. The Braves named him manager of the Brewers for 1951 and he again enjoyed huge success, winning an American Association title in 1951 and leading the Brewers to first place over the first two months of the 1952 campaign before his promotion to skipper of the MLB Braves May 31. Then, in 1953, as manager of the transplanted Milwaukee Braves, he led the city's first National League team to three first division finishes (1953–1955).

=== The coming of the Braves ===
Milwaukee had long been coveted by major league teams looking for a new home. Bill Veeck himself tried to relocate the St. Louis Browns back to Milwaukee in 1952, but his move was vetoed by the other American League owners; the Browns moved to Baltimore in 1954 and became the Orioles.

The city of Milwaukee, hoping to attract a major league club, constructed Milwaukee County Stadium for the 1953 season. The Brewers were set to move in, until spring training of 1953, when Lou Perini moved his Boston Braves to Milwaukee. The Brewers moved to Toledo, became the Sox, and continued the Brewers' winning ways, claiming an American Association pennant in their first season in Ohio.

=== Legacy – Return of the Brewers ===
The legacy of the American Association Milwaukee Brewers continues in the major league Milwaukee Brewers, which took its name from the 1902–1952 club.

After the Braves moved to Atlanta in 1966, local automobile dealer and Braves part-owner Bud Selig created a group to lobby for a new major league club in Milwaukee. As a name for his group, he chose "Milwaukee Brewers Baseball Club, Inc.", after the American Association club he grew up watching. As a logo, he chose the Beer Barrel Man in navy and red – traditional Brewers colors.

When Bud Selig bought the one-year-old Seattle Pilots franchise in the spring of 1970, he moved them to Milwaukee and they officially became the "new" major-league Milwaukee Brewers. The club continued to use the Beer Barrel Man (though in the Pilots' original colors of blue and gold) as the team's primary logo until 1978. Recently, it has seen a resurgence on throwback merchandise, and been featured on several stadium promotions.

Barrel Man as a suited mascot returned to active use in 2015 and changes its barrel depending on the theme (such as City Connect), and is now among a group of other mascots that includes Bernie Brewer and the Racing Sausages.

== American Association championships ==
The Milwaukee Brewers won eight pennants in their fifty-one seasons:

- 1913, 1914
- 1936
- 1943, 1944, 1945
- 1951, 1952

== Minor League championships ==
=== Championship series appearances ===
Before the Junior World Series became an annual event, the American Association pennant winners scheduled postseason minor league championship series against the champions of other leagues. For the Brewers' first two championships, these were held against the Denver Grizzlies of the Western League and Birmingham Barons of the Southern Association.

- 1913 – defeated Denver, 4 games to 2
- 1914 – defeated Birmingham, 4 games to 2

=== Junior World Series appearances ===
After 1919, the Junior World Series was held regularly between the American Association and the International League. For the 1936 season, the American Association introduced a Shaughnessy playoff between the league champions and three runners-up to determine the league's representative.

- 1936 – defeated Buffalo, 4 games to 1
- 1947 – defeated Syracuse, 4 games to 3
- 1951 – defeated Montreal, 4 games to 2

== Ballpark ==
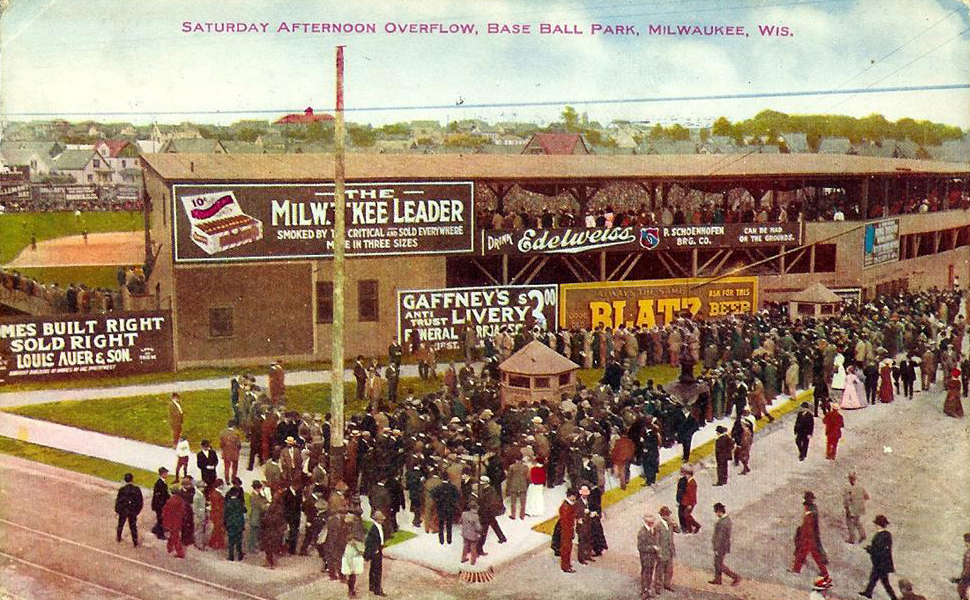
Borchert Field in a 1911 colorized postcard

During its 51-year tenure in the American Association, Milwaukee played in the same ballpark. Originally constructed in 1888, it was located in the North side of Milwaukee on a rectangular city block with the main entrance on Chambers St. between 7th and 8th Streets. It had abnormally short foul lines, 268 feet (82 m) to left and right. The fences then angled out sharply, making for deep "power alleys", and center field was 400 feet (122 m) from home plate. It was known as Athletic Park until 1928 when it was renamed Borchert Field in honor of Brewers owner Otto Borchert, who had died the previous year. The Polo Grounds had a similar, but larger, configuration.

Borchert Field was also the first Milwaukee home park for the Green Bay Packers, who played the New York Giants on Oct. 1, 1933. The following year, the Packers moved their Milwaukee games to the Wisconsin State Fair Grounds in West Allis.

Interstate 43 now runs through where Borchert Field once stood.

== Notable figures ==
Notable owners

- Bill Veeck
- Lou Perini

Notable managers

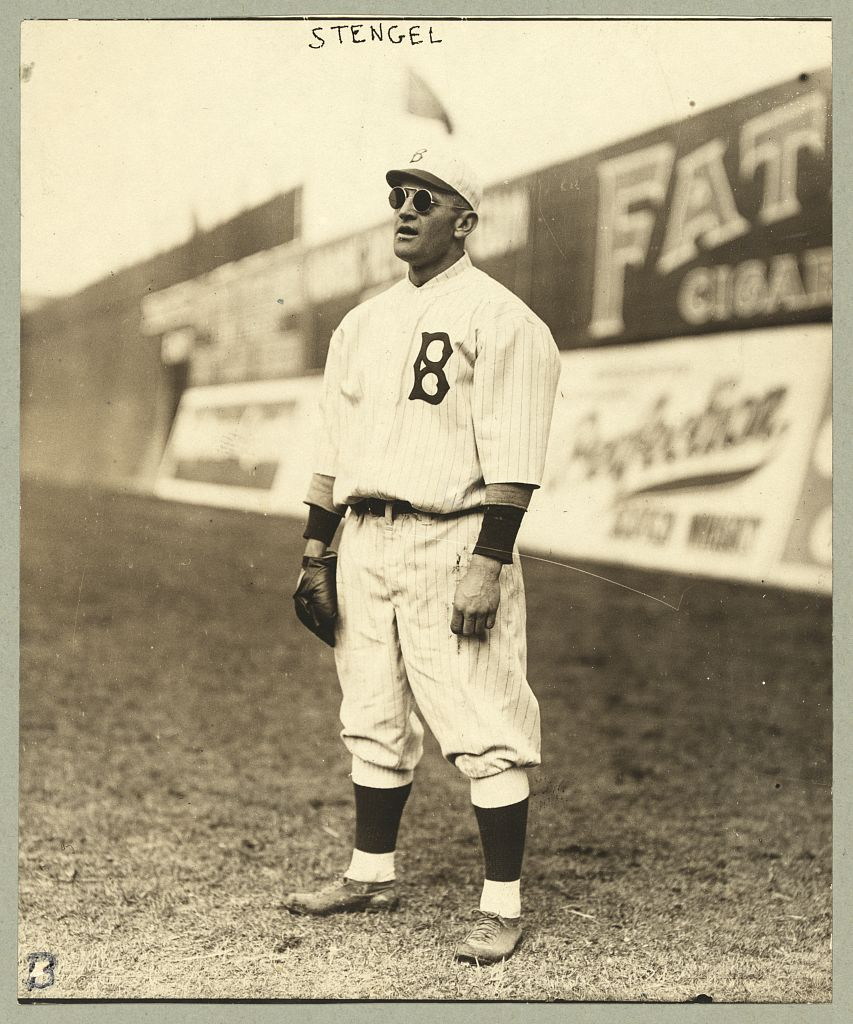
Casey Stengel

- Joe Cantillon
- Nick Cullop
- Rip Egan
- Charlie Grimm
- Frank O'Rourke
- Casey Stengel
- Allen Sothoron
- Red Smith
- Bucky Walters

Notable players

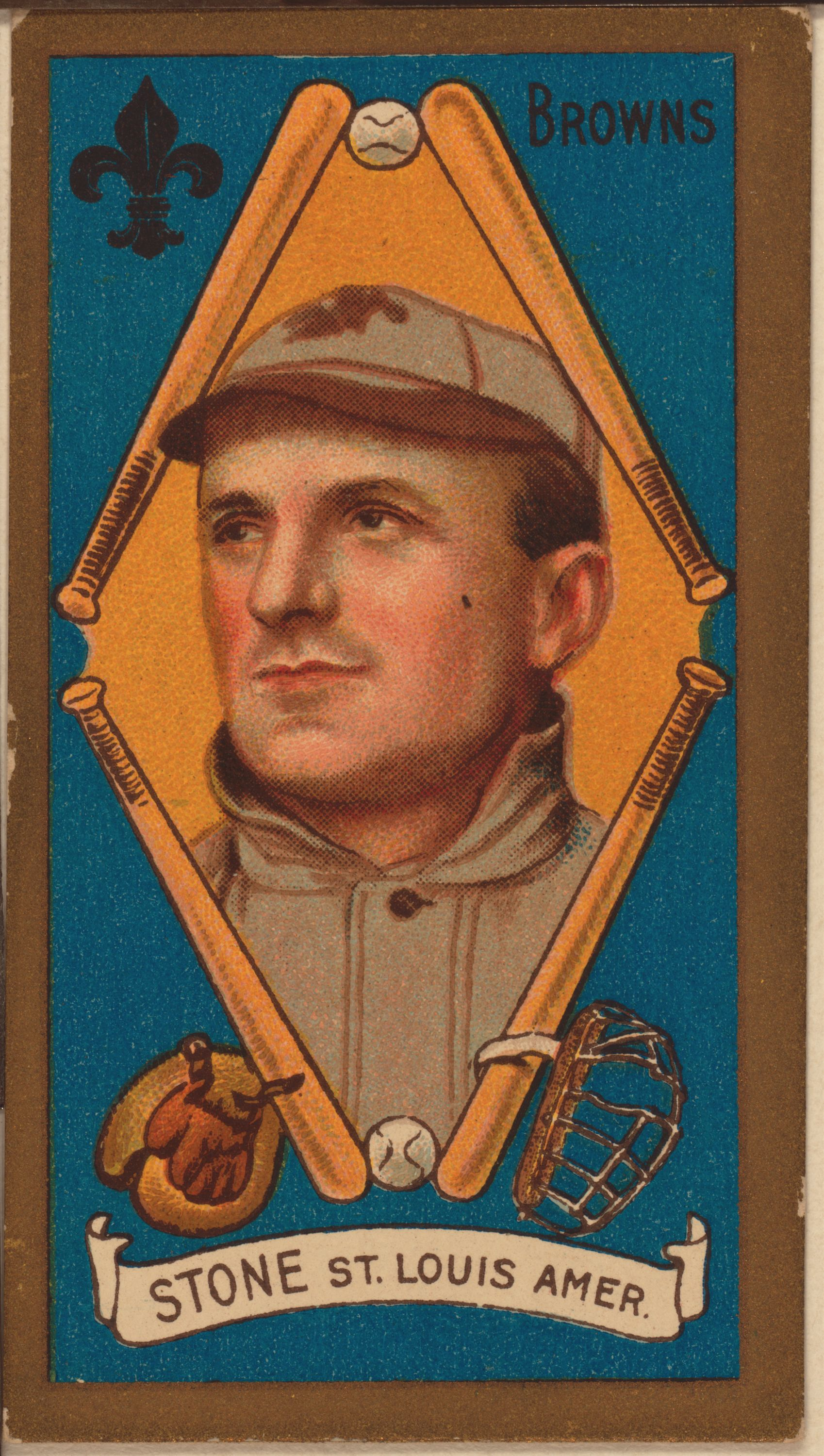
George Stone

- Heinz Becker
- Nick Altrock
- Sam Bohne (originally "Sam Cohen")
- Bill Bruton
- Gene Conley
- Alvin Dark
- Jack Dittmer
- Claude Elliott
- Happy Felsch
- Joe Hauser
- Bill Herring
- Chet Laabs
- Don Liddle
- Wes Livengood
- Johnny Logan
- Eddie Mathews
- Gene Mauch
- Stoney McGlynn
- Hal Peck
- Newt Randall
- Ray Schalk
- Al Simmons
- Floyd Speer
- Rollie Stiles
- George Stone, AL batting title champion
- Jim Thorpe
- Rudy York
- Ed Walsh

== See also ==
- History of professional baseball in Milwaukee
