= Dick Hoover (baseball) =

American baseball player (1925-1981)

- Pitcher
- Born: December 11, 1925; Columbus, Ohio, U.S.
- Died: April 12, 1981 (aged 55); Lake Placid, Florida, U.S.
- Batted: Left Threw: Left

MLB debut
- April 16, 1952, for the Boston Braves

Last MLB appearance
- April 23, 1952, for the Boston Braves

MLB statistics
- Win–loss record: 0–0
- Earned run average: 7.71
- Innings pitched: 4 2/3
- Stats at Baseball Reference

Teams
- Boston Braves (1952)

Richard Lloyd Hoover (December 11, 1925 – April 12, 1981) was an American relief pitcher in Major League Baseball who played for the Boston Braves during the 1952 season. Listed at 6 ft 0 in (1.83 m), 170 lb., he batted and threw left-handed.

== Career ==
Born in Columbus, Ohio, the 17-year-old Dick Hoover was signed by the New York Giants as an amateur free agent prior to the start of the 1943 season. He was assigned to the Appalachian League, where he finished 11–1 to lead the league in winning percentage (.917) while helping lead the Bristol Twins to a 74–35 pennant-winning record. But his baseball career was interrupted in 1944 after he entered service in the United States Navy during World War II.

Following his discharge in 1946, Hoover was part of successive transactions between the Giants, Cubs and Pirates organizations, playing for six different teams in a span of three years. Before the 1949 season, Hoover was sent by the Giants along with Gary Gearhart and cash consideration to the Atlanta Crackers of the Southern Association in exchange for Davey Williams. By then, the Crackers were a Class AA affiliate of the Boston Braves, a period during which they won more games than any other league team.

Hoover had two solid years with the Crackers, after going 11–11 with a 3.97 ERA in 1949 and 16–7, 3.35 in 1950. He was promoted to Triple A Milwaukee Brewers of the American Association in 1951, ending with a 5–4 record and a 3.14 ERA in 27 games, basically as a middle reliever and spot starter.

Hoover opened 1952 with the Boston Braves, pitching for them from April 16 through April 23. He made two relief appearances, allowing four runs on eight hits and three walks while striking out one batter in 4 2/3 innings of work. He did not have a decision, but gained notoriety by serving up the home run ball hit by future Hall of Famer Hoyt Wilhelm in his first Major League at bat. It would be the only homer Wilhelm would hit in his 20-year major league career.

Following his brief stint in the majors, Hoover returned to Milwaukee for the rest of the 1952 season. He went 10–5 while leading the pitching staff with a 2.60 ERA. He finished his career with Triple A Columbus Jets in 1955. His career highlight came on August 14, when he hurled a no-hitter against the Richmond Virginians.

In an 11-season, minors career Hoover posted an 89–72 record and a 3.44 ERA in 313 pitching appearances.

After baseball retirement in 1955, Hoover worked as a police sergeant in his native Columbus. He died in a traffic collision in Lake Placid, Florida at the age of 55 years, while making a vacation trip.

== See also ==
- 1952 Boston Braves season
