= Bob Thorpe (outfielder) =

American baseball player (1926-1996)

- Right fielder
- Born: November 19, 1926; Caryville, Florida, U.S.
- Died: October 30, 1996 (aged 69); Waveland, Mississippi, U.S.
- Batted: Right Threw: Right

MLB debut
- April 19, 1951, for the Boston Braves

Last MLB appearance
- September 27, 1953, for the Milwaukee Braves

MLB statistics
- Batting average: .251
- Home runs: 3
- Runs batted in: 32
- Stolen bases: 3
- Stats at Baseball Reference

Teams
- Boston / Milwaukee Braves (1951–1953)

Benjamin Robert Thorpe (November 19, 1926 – October 30, 1996) was an American professional baseball player who appeared in Major League Baseball (MLB), primarily as a right fielder, for the Boston / Milwaukee Braves (1951–1953). Born in Caryville, Florida, he threw and batted right-handed, stood 6 feet 1 inch (1.85 m) tall and weighed 190 pounds (86 kg).

Thorpe's 16-year professional career began in 1946. After five seasons in minor league baseball, he had a two-game trial with the Braves early in 1951, then spent all of 1952 on the club's big-league roster during its last season in Boston. Appearing in 81 games, with 67 starts in right field, Thorpe collected 76 hits, including his only three MLB home runs, with 26 runs batted in, batting .260. Moving with the Braves to Milwaukee for 1953, he got into only 27 games and his average plummeted 98 points to .162. It was his last major-league opportunity. In MLB, he got into 110 total games played; his 83 career hits included nine doubles and three triples, as well as his three homers. He drove in 32 RBI and batted .251.

Thorpe played in the minors from 1954 through 1961. During his minor-league career, he reached double figures in home runs in 11 different seasons. He died in Waveland, Mississippi, three weeks shy of his 70th birthday.
