= Charlie Grimm =

American baseball player and manager (1898–1983)

- Grimm in 1936 photo for Chicago Cubs
- First baseman / Manager
- Born: August 28, 1898; St. Louis, Missouri, U.S.
- Died: November 15, 1983 (aged 85); Scottsdale, Arizona, U.S.
- Batted: Left Threw: Left

MLB debut
- July 30, 1916, for the Philadelphia Athletics

Last MLB appearance
- September 23, 1936, for the Chicago Cubs

MLB statistics
- Batting average: .290
- Hits: 2,299
- Home runs: 79
- Runs batted in: 1,077
- Managerial record: 1,287–1,067
- Winning %: .547
- Stats at Baseball Reference

Teams
- As player: Philadelphia Athletics (1916); St. Louis Cardinals (1918); Pittsburgh Pirates (1919–1924); Chicago Cubs (1925–1936); As manager: Chicago Cubs (1932–1938, 1944–1949); Boston / Milwaukee Braves (1952–1956); Chicago Cubs (1960)

Career highlights and awards
- Chicago Cubs Hall of Fame

Charles John Grimm (August 28, 1898 – November 15, 1983), nicknamed "Jolly Cholly", was an American professional baseball player and manager. He played in Major League Baseball as a first baseman, most notably for the Chicago Cubs; he was also a sometime radio sports commentator, and a popular goodwill ambassador for baseball. He played for the Pittsburgh Pirates early in his career, but was traded to the Cubs in 1925 and worked mostly for the Cubs for the rest of his career. Born in St. Louis, Missouri, to parents of German extraction, Grimm was known for being outgoing and chatty, even singing old-fashioned songs while accompanying himself on a left-handed banjo. Grimm is one of a select few to have played and managed in 2,000 games each.

== Playing career ==
=== Early years and Pittsburgh (1916–1924) ===
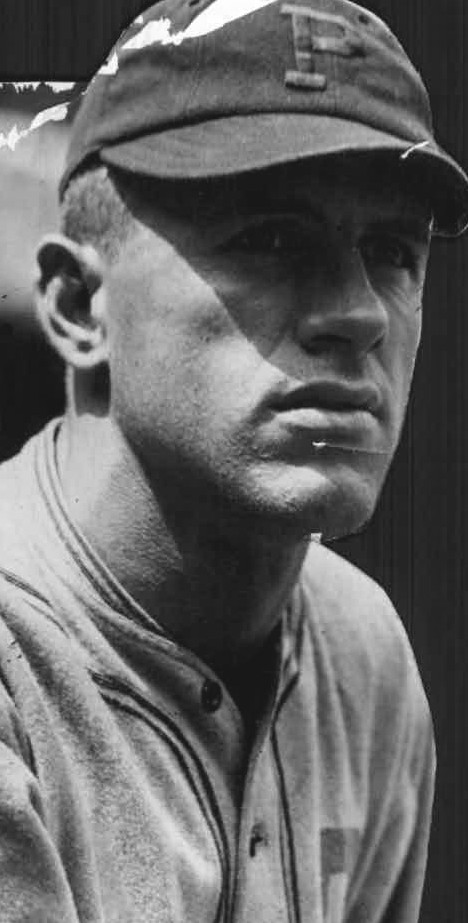
Grimm with the Pittsburgh Pirates in 1921

Grimm made his start in the majors in 1916, having been signed by the Philadelphia Athletics as an amateur free agent on July 28; two days later, he played against the Chicago White Sox in Chicago to play left field. He went 0-for-3 with a walk and a strikeout in the 10–1 loss. He played twelve games for the Philadelphia Athletics, with five of those games spent as a pinch hitter and the other games in the outfield. He managed two hits and was purchased by Durham after the year ended. He batted .253 with the Bulls in 29 games before he found his way back to the majors again in 1918. He played with the St. Louis Cardinals and appeared in 50 games from June to August while batting .220 while serving usually as the first baseman or pinch hitter. He also spent time with the Little Rock Travelers for the season and batted .298 in 56 games. He would split time with the Travelers (131 games) and a major league team again with the 1919 season, this time playing with the Pittsburgh Pirates (after purchasing him) for 14 games in the month of September. After batting .318 with the latter team, he stayed on with the team on a more permanent basis.

Grimm played 148 games with the Pirates for 1920, primarily at first base, where he had a .995 fielding percentage in 1,327 innings. He batted .227/.273/.289 for the team; he hit his first home run on June 29 against the Chicago Cubs. He had 54 RBIs while walking 30 times and striking out 40 times.

For the next season, he played in 151 games while raising his totals in every category, batting .274 while having 154 hits and 71 runs batted in (RBI) to go with 31 walks to 38 strikeouts. He continued to raise himself in the following two years, which included batting .345 in 1923

In 1924, Grimm closed out his Pirates career by playing 151 games and batting .288 with 156 hits and 63 RBIs, which were all decreases from the year before. However, he walked 37 times while only striking out 22 times, making it just the second time in five full seasons with the team that he had more walks than strikeouts. Ultimately, Grimm played 770 games with the Pirates over the course of five and a half seasons (missing just twelve games in those five full seasons).

=== Chicago Cubs (1925–1936) ===
On October 27, 1924, he was traded along with Wilbur Cooper and Rabbit Maranville to the Chicago Cubs. The Pirates would go to the World Series twice without Grimm in the next three seasons and win once while Grimm would play a part in one pennant as a player for the Cubs, often serving as a bright spot in the team. For example, he played 141 games for the Cubs in 1925 and batted .306 while having 159 hits and 76 RBIs, which went well with 38 walks and 25 strikeouts to garner a 13th place finish in voting for Most Valuable Player. He continued to have more walks than strikeouts, which he would do for ten straight seasons. From 1920 to 1932, he would have at least 120 hits, and he would hit .300 for the Cubs four times.

In 1929, his team would finally buoy itself into the pantheon for the National League pennant, the first for the team in eleven years. He batted .298 in 120 games while having 91 RBIs (the most he ever recorded as a Cub) with 138 hits. The Cubs advanced to the World Series against his old team in the Athletics. He was the only hitter on the team to bat left-handed, which proved key to the right-handed pitchers for the Athletics, who were not troubled by having Lefty Grove go in the bullpen. In five games, he had seven hits (including a home run that gave them a 2–0 lead in Game 4), but they were doomed by a memorable meltdown in Game 4, in which they lost an 8–0 lead on multiple hits and even a miscue by Hack Wilson that led to a home run and eventually ten runs in the bottom of the 7th inning. The Athletics prevailed two days later to win the Series.

In 1932, as player-manager, he led them to the National League pennant. He played in 149 games while batting .307 and having 80 RBIs and 175 hits. During the season, he recorded his 2,000th hit, doing so on July 6 against the Philadelphia Phillies at Wrigley Field off Snipe Hansen. In the World Series that year, he had five hits in what turned out to be an easy sweep for the Yankees.

The following year was his last as a primary player for the team, as he played in 107 games while batting .247. He would play a combined total of 116 games in his last three seasons. While he did not lead many categories in the hitting department, he was a solid fielder in terms of durability, playing 2,131 games in the first base position (owing to twelve seasons of being in the top ten for games played alongside putouts) that ranked third at the time he retired, and his 20,711 putouts are fifth most in MLB history (Eddie Murray is the only player to have passed Grimm since the latter's retirement). He also led the league in fielding percentage for the position seven times.

In 2,166 games over 20 seasons, spanning from 1916–1936, Grimm posted a .290 batting average (2299-for-7917) with 908 runs, 394 doubles, 108 triples, 79 home runs, 1077 RBI, 57 stolen bases, 578 bases on balls, .341 on-base percentage and .397 slugging percentage. He finished his career with a .993 fielding percentage as a first baseman. In the 1929 and 1932 World Series, he hit .364 (12-for-33) with 4 runs, 2 doubles, 1 home run, 5 RBI and 3 walks.

== Managerial career ==
=== Chicago Cubs (1932–1938, 1944–1949) ===
On August 2, 1932, Rogers Hornsby was fired by the Cubs. Grimm was enlisted by the team to serve as player-manager. While serving as manager for the remaining 55 games, he rallied them to 37 wins that helped the team finish with a 90–64 record, finishing four games ahead of Pittsburgh for the National League pennant. This was the first pennant for the Cubs since 1929. In the 1932 World Series, they would be swept by the New York Yankees in four games. Grimm would retain the position of manager for the next seven seasons. In his first tenure as the Cubs manager, his teams would finish no worse than third place. In the two seasons after his first pennant, he led them to 86 wins each, which was good for third place. The 1935 season proved superior for Grimm and Cubs, as he led them to their first 100-win season in 25 years, made most memorable by a 21-game winning streak in the month of September. In the World Series that year against the Detroit Tigers, they won the first game in Detroit before losing the next three. They rallied to win Game 5 at Wrigley Field, but the Tigers won a walk-off hit from Goose Goslin to win 4–3 and seal the Series. The Cubs went 87–67 for a third place finish the following year (which was Grimm's last as a player-manager), but they improved to 93–61 and second place the year after. 1938 was his last season of his first tenure as manager of the Cubs. The team was 45–36 when owner Philip K. Wrigley moved Grimm to the broadcast booth and named catcher Gabby Hartnett as player-manager. As Grimm had done six years earlier, Hartnett led the Cubs to a dramatic comeback to win the league pennant that season.

After a sluggish start to the 1944 season which the team lost ten in a row after winning the Opening Day game, Grimm was hired to manage the club again. The team finished fourth in the standings with a 75–79 record (the fifth straight losing season for the team). However, Grimm led them to a dramatic improvement the following year, going 98–56 to win the league pennant for the first time since 1938. In the World Series that year, Grimm's team faced off against the Tigers once again. It was a hard-fought series, going down to the decisive seventh game at Wrigley Field. The Cubs were trounced 9–3, with six of the Tiger runs coming in the first two innings. It was the last pennant for the Cubs for 71 years. The Cubs went 82–71 the following year, finishing 3rd in the standings. It was the last time the team had a record of .500 until 1963. Grimm finished his last three seasons with losing record (69–85, 64–90, 19–31) before resigning in 1949.

After his resignation from being manager, he served as the Cubs' Director of Player Personnel, then the club's title for general manager, doing so until February 1950 due to not feeling comfortable in his front-office post. He subsequently was hired to manage a Double A team, the Dallas Eagles of the Texas League.

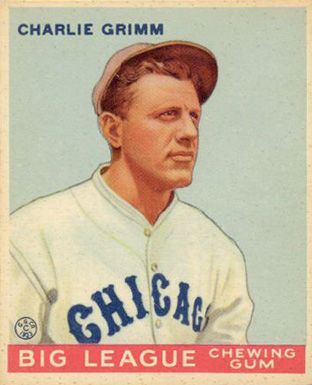
A 1933 Goudey baseball card of Charlie Grimm as a member of the Chicago Cubs.

=== Later career (1952–1956, 1960) ===
Grimm would soon become a major baseball figure in Milwaukee. He was hired by Bill Veeck, son of longtime Cubs president William Veeck Sr. to manage his Milwaukee Brewers, then the Cubs' top farm team, during World War II in 1941. Being of German extraction, he was popular in the Beer City. He returned to the Brewers in 1951 when they were a farm team of the Boston Braves. He was highly successful as a manager during each term, winning the regular season American Association title in 1943 and 1951, and the playoff championship in 1951. On May 30, 1952, Grimm was promoted from Milwaukee to manager of the big league Braves; he would prove to be the last skipper in the history of the Boston NL club. He went 51–67 (with two ties) as the Braves finished seventh place.

He then managed the Milwaukee Braves for their first three years after their move to Wisconsin in March 1953. The following year, the Braves went 92–62 (with three ties), finishing 13 games behind in second place to the Brooklyn Dodgers. It was the first time the Braves had won over 90 games since 1948. The next year, they regressed a bit as a team with an 89–65 record for a third place finish (eight games back), but it was the first time that they had consecutive winning seasons since 1947–48. The next year, they went 85–69, finishing 13.5 games back of the Dodgers. The 1956 season proved to be a nail-biter for the team, but Grimm was not to be a big part of said season. He was dismissed after a 24–22 start to the season, replaced by Fred Haney. Haney led them to a 68–40 record while losing the league pennant to the Dodgers by one game. Haney led the team to a World Series championship the following year.

He was brought out of retirement to direct the Cubs again in early 1960, but the team got off to a slow start, and owner P.K. Wrigley made the novel move of swapping Grimm with another former manager, Lou Boudreau, who was doing Cubs radiocasts at that time. Grimm had done play-by-play in the past, so he gave it one more go in 1960, before stepping back to the ranks of coaching and then front office duties.

It was in 1961 that Wrigley began his "College of Coaches", of which Grimm was a part but was never designated "Head Coach". One of the Cubs' coaches during that 5-year experiment was baseball's first black coach, Buck O'Neil.

== Legacy ==
Grimm finished with a record of 1,287–1,067–12 while having a postseason record of 5–12. His 946 wins as a Cubs manager rank second behind Cap Anson. Serving as manager for nineteen seasons, Grimm won three pennants while finishing second three times and finishing 3rd four times; excluding his last brief run in 1960, he finished with a losing record as a manager just three times in a full season. only twelve other managers had finished with a record that had more than 200 wins as compared to losses (i.e. wins over .500), for which Grimm was 220 wins over .500. In the six decades since his last game, thirteen have joined him in said category. Of the 26 managers, Grimm is one of eight to not be inducted into the National Baseball Hall of Fame. Grimm is one of 29 managers to win 1,000 games and three league pennants, although he is one of five who are not currently inducted into the National Baseball Hall of Fame and is also one of six to not have won a World Series (although each member coached in the 19th century). In balloting for the Baseball Hall of Fame, he was on the ballot twelve times from 1939 to 1962, but he never received more than 9% of the vote. Baseball historian Bill James wrote, "One of the biggest surprises to me, when I ranked the managers, was how high up the lists Charlie Grimm was. He ranks about even with Al López, Whitey Herzog, Tony La Russa, Frank Chance, those kinds of guys. Not the 10 greatest managers in history, but the class right behind them."

== Managerial record ==
Team	Year	Regular season					Postseason			
Team	Year	Games	Won	Lost	Win %	Finish	Won	Lost	Win %	Result
CHC	1932	55	37	18	.673	1st in NL	0	4	.000	Lost World Series (NYY)
CHC	1933	154	86	68	.558	3rd in NL	–	–	–	–
CHC	1934	152	86	65	.570	3rd in NL	–	–	–	–
CHC	1935	154	100	54	.649	1st in NL	2	4	.333	Lost World Series (DET)
CHC	1936	154	87	67	.565	3rd in NL	–	–	–	–
CHC	1937	154	93	61	.604	2nd in NL	–	–	–	–
CHC	1938	81	45	36	.556	(reassigned)	–	–	–	–
CHC	1944	146	74	69	.517	4th in NL	–	–	–	–
CHC	1945	155	98	56	.636	1st in NL	3	4	.429	Lost World Series (DET)
CHC	1946	155	82	71	.536	3rd in NL	–	–	–	–
CHC	1947	155	69	85	.448	6th in NL	–	–	–	–
CHC	1948	155	64	90	.416	8th in NL	–	–	–	–
CHC	1949	50	19	31	.380	(resigned)	–	–	–	–
BOB	1952	120	51	67	.432	7th in NL	–	–	–	–
MIL	1953	157	97	67	.591	2nd in NL	–	–	–	–
MIL	1954	154	89	65	.578	3rd in NL	–	–	–	–
MIL	1955	154	85	69	.552	2nd in NL	–	–	–	–
MIL	1956	46	24	22	.522	(fired)	–	–	–	–
BOB/MIL total		631	341	285	.545		–	–	–	–
CHC	1960	17	6	11	.353	(reassigned)	–	–	–	–
CHC total		1,737	946	782	.547		5	12	.294	
Total		2,368	1,287	1,067	.547		5	12	.294	

== Post-retirement ==
After his retirement from baseball, he lived adjacent to Lake Koshkonong, near Fort Atkinson, Wisconsin. Grimm died in Scottsdale, Arizona, at age 85, from cancer. His widow was granted permission to spread his ashes on Wrigley Field.

== See also ==
- List of Major League Baseball career hits leaders
- List of Major League Baseball career triples leaders
- List of Major League Baseball career runs batted in leaders
- List of Major League Baseball managers with most career ejections
- List of Major League Baseball managerial wins and winning percentage leaders
- List of Major League Baseball player-managers
