= Jack Daniels (baseball) =

American baseball player (1927-2013)

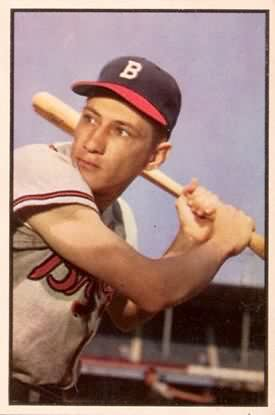
- Daniels' 1953 Bowman card
- Right fielder
- Born: December 21, 1927; Chester, Pennsylvania
- Died: April 16, 2013 (aged 85); Shreveport, Louisiana
- Batted: Left Threw: Left

MLB debut
- April 18, 1952, for the Boston Braves

Last MLB appearance
- September 28, 1952, for the Boston Braves

MLB statistics
- Batting average: .187
- Home runs: 2
- Runs batted in: 14
- Stats at Baseball Reference

Teams
- Boston Braves (1952)

Harold Jack Daniels (December 21, 1927 – April 16, 2013) was an American outfielder in Major League Baseball. Listed at 5' 10", (1.78 m), 165 lb., (75 kg), Daniels batted and threw left-handed. He was born in Chester, Pennsylvania.

At age 24, it had been a long journey to the major leagues for Daniels. He spent nearly seven full seasons in the minor leagues, playing for nine teams at six different levels before reaching the majors with the Boston Braves during the 1952 season.

Daniels appeared in 106 games, mostly as a right fielder, while sharing outfield duties with Sid Gordon (LF) and Sam Jethroe (CF). He posted a batting average of .187 (41-for-219) with two home runs and 14 runs batted in, scoring 31 runs, and collecting five doubles, one triple and three stolen bases.

"Sour Mash Jack", as his teammates nicknamed him (a reference to Jack Daniel's whiskey), returned to the minors for six more seasons and retired at the end of 1958. He posted a .255 average with 167 homers and 214 RBI in 1375 games.

Daniels died in 2013 in Shreveport, Louisiana, at the age of 85.

== See also ==
- 1952 Boston Braves season

== Sources ==
- Career statistics from Baseball Reference · Baseball Reference (Minors) · Retrosheet · Baseball Almanac
- Retrosheet
