= William Bartholomay =

American insurance executive (1928–2020)

Bill Bartholomay
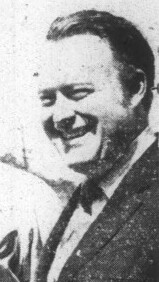
- Bartholomay in 1970
- Born: August 11, 1928; Evanston, Illinois, USA
- Died: March 25, 2020 (aged 91); New York, New York, USA
- Education: North Shore Country Day School; Lake Forest College
- Occupations: Major League Baseball team owner and executive

William Conrad Bartholomay (August 11, 1928 – March 25, 2020) was an American business executive who made his living in the insurance industry in Chicago but became widely known as the owner who brought Major League Baseball (MLB) to the Southeastern United States with the Atlanta Braves in 1966. Although he sold the franchise to Ted Turner in late 1975, Bartholomay remained an executive with the Braves until his death, over 57 years since he acquired the team late in 1962 when it was still based in Milwaukee.

== Early life ==
Bartholomay was born in Evanston, Illinois. His father, Henry, was an executive at Alexander & Alexander, one of the largest insurance brokerages in the United States. His mother, Virginia (née Graves), drove for the U.S. Army Motor Corps in World War I and was active in the American Red Cross during World War II. One of William's great-grandfathers, also Henry Bartholomay, emigrated from Germany to Rochester, New York, where he established Bartholomay Brewing Company in 1874. Another great-grandfather, Conrad Seipp, founded Chicago's Conrad Seipp Brewing Company. Henry and Virginia's family was friendly with Philip K. Wrigley, the chewing-gum magnate and longtime owner of the Chicago Cubs.

William was an alumnus of North Shore Country Day School and Lake Forest College and entered the insurance business after his graduation from college.

== Baseball career ==
=== Chicago White Sox ===
Bartholomay first entered into baseball ownership at age 33 when, in 1961, he assembled a group of investors into the LaSalle Corporation, which acquired the 46 percent minority share of the American League's Chicago White Sox owned by Chuck Comiskey, grandson of the team's legendary founder. But his involvement with his hometown team did not last long. In November 1962, he and his LaSalle Corporation sold their stake in the White Sox to majority owners Arthur and John Allyn, and bought the Milwaukee Braves of the National League (NL) from Lou Perini of Boston. The purchase price was a reported $6.2 million.

=== Milwaukee/Atlanta Braves ===
Despite the Braves' early success in Milwaukee, where the team had set league attendance records (after the franchise was moved from Boston) from 1953 to 1958, fan support was waning badly when Bartholomay purchased the team. In 1962, the Braves had attracted only 766,921 to Milwaukee County Stadium. Bartholomay became intent on moving the team to Atlanta, a growing regional center, where there was more television revenue, and where the new, 52,000-seat Atlanta Stadium had recently been built. He wanted to be the first man to bring a baseball team to the Deep South. Bartholomay worked with many civic leaders to help attain his dream. After an extended legal battle with Milwaukee that kept the Braves from moving through the 1965 season, and many death threats, the National League agreed to the shift to Atlanta. The case ultimately led to baseball's guidelines on local ownership.

The Atlanta Braves' first ten seasons were marked by a National League West Division title in 1969 and Hank Aaron's historic pursuit of Babe Ruth's career home run record. On April 8, 1974, in the fourth inning of the Braves' home opener—played before a packed house of 53,775—Aaron smashed Al Downing's delivery into the Braves' left-field bullpen for his record-setting 715th career blast, setting off a memorable celebration. However, the Braves were swept by the New York Mets in the 1969 National League Championship Series, Aaron, 40, was traded after the 1974 campaign, and a succession of mostly mediocre teams drove down attendance after it reached its initial peak of 1.54 million fans in the club's debut season in Atlanta.

In 1975, Bartholomay was approached with a business proposition by a friend, Ted Turner. The two knew that a baseball team and network deal would be a good way to market the Braves on a national scale and provide programming for Turner's developing (TBS) network. Bartholomay agreed and sold the controlling interest of the team to Turner (of Turner Broadcasting System, Inc., and owner of CNN), while retaining his interest as chairman.

Bartholomay was a Life Trustee of Illinois Institute of Technology.

== Death ==
On March 25, 2020, Bartholomay died in New York-Presbyterian Hospital, New York City, of complications resulting from a respiratory illness, subsequent to a bout with pneumonia in December 2019. He was 91 years old.
