= Mel Roach =

American baseball player (1933–2023)

- Infielder / Left fielder
- Born: January 25, 1933; Richmond, Virginia, U.S.
- Died: July 31, 2023 (aged 90); Richmond, Virginia, U.S.
- Batted: Right Threw: Right

MLB debut
- July 31, 1953, for the Milwaukee Braves

Last MLB appearance
- September 28, 1962, for the Philadelphia Phillies

MLB statistics
- Batting average: .238
- Home runs: 7
- Run batted in: 43
- Stats at Baseball Reference

Teams
- Milwaukee Braves (1953–1954, 1957–1961); Chicago Cubs (1961); Philadelphia Phillies (1962)

Melvin Earl Roach (January 25, 1933 – July 31, 2023) was an American professional baseball player. His career derailed by his bonus player status, military service and injury, he appeared in 227 games played over all or parts of eight years in Major League Baseball as a utilityman for the Milwaukee Braves (1953–54 and 1957–61), Chicago Cubs (1961) and Philadelphia Phillies (1962). Roach was born in Richmond, Virginia and attended John Marshall High School; he threw and batted right-handed and was listed as 6 feet 1 inch (1.85 m) tall and 190 pounds (86 kg).

== Career ==
A standout second baseman at the University of Virginia, he signed a $40,000 contract with Milwaukee in 1953 but was compelled by the era's Bonus Rule to spend his first two professional years on the Braves' major-league roster, appearing in only eight games and going hitless in six total plate appearances. Then, he lost two full seasons (1955–56) to service in the United States Navy. When his pro career began in earnest in 1957, Roach hit .304 in 107 games in the high minors. After his early-August recall by the 1957 Braves—en route to the world championship—he sat on the bench as a seldom-used pinch hitter and backup infielder. He appeared in only six regular-season games, and was idle during the 1957 World Series.

In 1958, Roach made the Braves' roster out of spring training and an early-season injury to centerfielder Bill Bruton opened a spot for Roach as the right fielder in the Milwaukee lineup (with Baseball Hall of Famer Hank Aaron switching from right-field to Bruton's position). Roach started three games and collected seven hits in 15 at bats (.467), but when the roster had to be trimmed from 28 to 25 players in mid-May, Roach was optioned to Triple-A Wichita, where he appeared in 20 games over a full month before getting recalled to the majors. Over the next two months he got into 39 games, largely as a backup to Hall of Fame second baseman Red Schoendienst, and was hitting .309 with 42 hits and three home runs on August 3 when Daryl Spencer of the San Francisco Giants slid hard into Roach at second base, badly injuring Roach's left knee. He underwent surgery, missing the remainder of 1958 (and the 1958 World Series), and the first two months of the 1959 campaign.

Although the knee injury didn't end Roach's career, as had been initially feared, his diminished infield range damaged his chances of regular second base duty. He batted only .097 in 19 games for the 1959 Braves and spent more time as a utility outfielder and third baseman as his career progressed. In 1960, he produced a near-carbon copy of his 1958 campaign. Appearing in 42 total games, he batted an even .300 with three home runs and 42 hits. But he was destined for journeyman status for the remaining two years of his MLB tenure. On May 9, 1961, the Braves dealt Roach to the Chicago Cubs straight-up for veteran outfielder Frank Thomas. After a half-season in Chicago, the Cubs traded Roach to the Phillies during spring training of 1962. Although he spent both 1961 and 1962 in the majors, Roach lost his batting stroke, hitting only .147 and .190 respectively, then retired from baseball after the 1962 campaign.

In all or parts of his eight MLB seasons, Roach played in 227 games and had 499 at-bats, 42 runs, 119 hits, 25 doubles, seven home runs, 43 RBI, one stolen base, 24 walks, .238 batting average, .275 on-base percentage, .331 slugging percentage, 165 total bases and nine sacrifice hits.

== Personal life ==
Roach died on July 31, 2023, at the age of 90.
