= Jack Cusick =

American baseball player (1928–1989)

- Shortstop
- Born: June 12, 1928; Weehawken, New Jersey, U.S.
- Died: November 17, 1989 (aged 61); Englewood, New Jersey, U.S.
- Batted: Right Threw: Right

MLB debut
- April 24, 1951, for the Chicago Cubs

Last MLB appearance
- September 28, 1952, for the Boston Braves

MLB statistics
- Batting average: .174
- Home runs: 2
- RBI: 22
- Stats at Baseball Reference

Teams
- Chicago Cubs (1951); Boston Braves (1952)

John Peter Cusick (June 12, 1928 - November 17, 1989) was an American right-handed shortstop in Major League Baseball for the Chicago Cubs and Boston Braves.

Signed as an amateur free agent out of high school by the Philadelphia Phillies in 1946, Cusick was assigned to the Americus Phillies, a class D ballclub. From 1946 through 1948, he toiled in the lower levels of Philadelphia's farm system before being drafted by the St. Louis Cardinals in the 1948 minor league draft. Cusick was assigned to the AA level in both 1949 and 1950, but the Cardinals released him mid-1950 and he was signed by the New York Yankees. After he spent just a portion of one season in the Yankees' organization, the Cubs drafted Cusick from the Yankees in the 1950 Rule 5 draft, and he opened the 1951 season on a major league roster for the first time, as the Cubs' backup shortstop.

Cusick made his major league debut in the Cubs' sixth game, April 24, going 0-for-1 against Bill Werle of the Pittsburgh Pirates, but got his first major league hit in his next game, an RBI double off Kurt Krieger of St. Louis. From that point until early July, Cusick served as the team's everyday shortstop. His first major league home run came in the second game of a May 13 doubleheader against Pittsburgh, off Pirates starter Murry Dickson. The second came just five days later, a grand slam off Phillies reliever Ken Johnson. It would be his last. Cusick struggled to maintain a decent batting average and lost his starting job, though he remained with the team all season. He appeared in only 8 games after July 18, starting just once. After the season, the Cubs shipped Cusick to the Boston Braves in exchange for Bob Addis.

Boston gave Cusick a new opportunity to be a starting shortstop, as he started most of their first 26 games. Batting just .161 after their May 17 game, Cusick lost his job to Johnny Logan. Still, he stayed with the big league club, appearing in 25 more games that season, but made just seven appearances in the field, finding himself largely relegated to a pinch-hitter/pinch-runner role. Cusick's final major league hit came August 30, a single off Andy Hansen.

Cusick found himself jobless in baseball after the 1952 season and subsequently retired. He died November 17, 1989, in Englewood, New Jersey, and is buried in George Washington Memorial Park (Paramus, New Jersey).
