= Sibby Sisti =

American baseball player (1920–2006)

- Infielder
- Born: July 26, 1920; Buffalo, New York, U.S.
- Died: April 24, 2006 (aged 85); Amherst, New York, U.S.
- Batted: Right Threw: Right

MLB debut
- July 21, 1939, for the Boston Bees

Last MLB appearance
- June 6, 1954, for the Milwaukee Braves

MLB statistics
- Batting average: .244
- Home runs: 27
- Runs batted in: 260
- Stats at Baseball Reference

Teams
- Boston Bees / Boston Braves / Milwaukee Braves (1939–1942, 1946–1954)

Sebastian Daniel "Sibby" Sisti (July 26, 1920 – April 24, 2006) was an American Major League Baseball utility player.

== Playing career ==
Sisti stood 5 ft 11 in (180 cm) tall and weighed 175 pounds (79 kg). His perseverance in the face of numerous injuries made him a fan favorite. Known for his versatility, Sisti played every position except pitcher and catcher during his major league career.

At the age of 18, Sisti made his Major League Baseball debut with the Boston Bees on July 21, 1939, just five days before he turned 19, then remained with the club (later known as the Boston Braves) through 1942, after the beginning of World War II. He served in the United States Coast Guard from 1943 to 1945.

After returning from the war, where the Braves had no place for him in their lineup, he spent most of 1946 with the Indianapolis Indians of the American Association, hitting .343 for that club and winning The Sporting News Minor League Player of the Year Award. The following year, he returned to the Braves.

In 1948, Sisti played a key role in the club's run to the World Series, filling in for injured second baseman Eddie Stanky for part of the season. He remained with the team when they became the Milwaukee Braves in 1953, and retired from playing in 1954 to join their coaching staff.

== After retirement ==
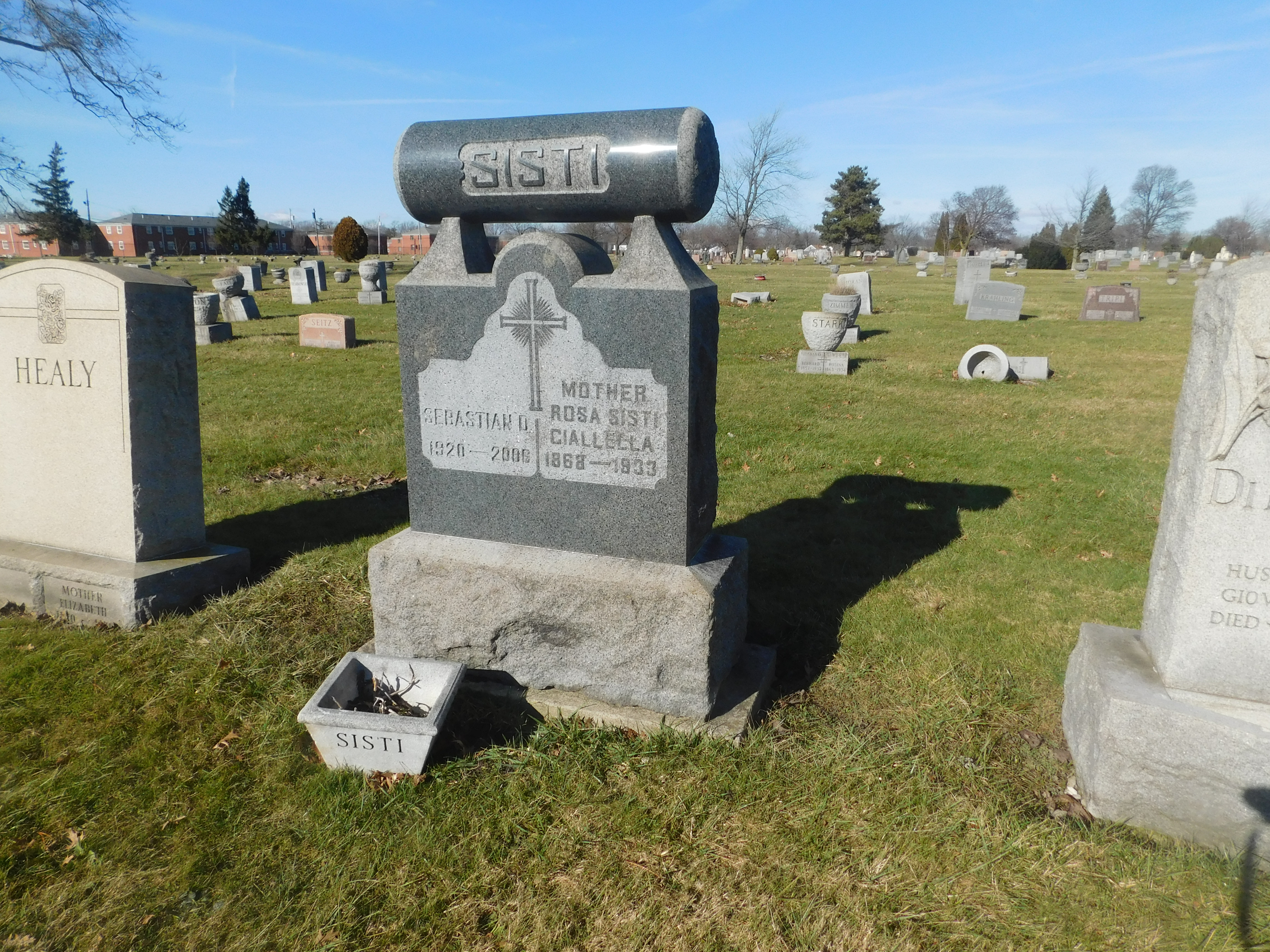
Sisti's grave at Mount Calvary Cemetery in Cheektowaga, New York

After leaving the Braves, Sisti coached and managed in the minors for many years and coached for the expansion Seattle Pilots in 1969.

The last page of The Great American Baseball Card Flipping, Trading and Bubble Gum Book (by Brendan C. Boyd & Fred C. Harris, Little Brown & Co, 1973) had a card of Sisti in his Braves uniform catching a ball, with the authors' caption, "Goodnight, Sibby Sisti, wherever you are."

Sisti appeared in a small role in the 1984 film The Natural (which was filmed in Buffalo), portraying the Pittsburgh manager. He was also a consultant on the film, ensuring that it captured the feel of 1930s baseball.

On April 24, 2006, Sisti died at the age of 85 in Amherst, New York. He was interred in the Mount Calvary Cemetery in Cheektowaga, New York.

Sisti was a first cousin of Dan Carnevale, a minor league manager who made the majors in 1970 with the Kansas City Royals as a first base coach.

== See also ==
- List of Major League Baseball players who spent their entire career with one franchise
