= Paul Burris (baseball) =

American baseball player (1923–1999)

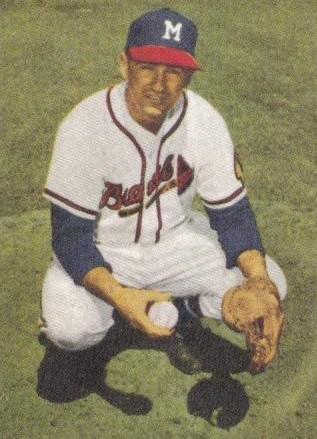
- Catcher
- Born: July 21, 1923; Hickory, North Carolina, U.S.
- Died: October 3, 1999 (aged 76); Charlotte, North Carolina, U.S.
- Batted: Right Threw: Right

MLB debut
- October 2, 1948, for the Boston Braves

Last MLB appearance
- June 4, 1953, for the Milwaukee Braves

MLB statistics
- Batting average: .219
- Home runs: 2
- Runs batted in: 24
- Stats at Baseball Reference

Teams
- Boston / Milwaukee Braves (1948; 1950; 1952–1953)

Paul Robert Burris (July 21, 1923 – October 3, 1999) was an American professional baseball player, a catcher who appeared in 69 games in the Major Leagues for the Boston / Milwaukee Braves (1948; 1950; 1952–53). Born in Hickory, North Carolina, he threw and batted right-handed and was listed as 6 feet (1.8 m) tall and 190 pounds (86 kg).

Burris broke into pro baseball in 1942 in the Brooklyn Dodgers' organization. He served in the United States Army during World War II and missed the 1943–45 seasons before returning to baseball. He was selected by the Braves in the December 1947 minor league draft and spent most of the remainder of his 12-year active career in the Brave organization, including two full campaigns (1952–53) on the MLB roster.

In 1952, Burris backed up regular catcher Walker Cooper and appeared in 55 games for the Braves during their final season in Boston. Burris batted .220 with 37 hits in 168 at bats. On May 30, he went two-for-two against the Dodgers' Carl Erskine, the only two safeties allowed by Erskine in a game Brooklyn won, 11–2. One of Burris's hits was his first big-league home run, a two-run shot that accounted for Boston's scoring. On June 12 against the Pittsburgh Pirates at Forbes Field, he shook off the rust by going four for five, with a double and his second big-league home run (hit off Paul LaPalme), and notched six runs batted in in a game the Braves won by an 11–2 score.

Burris accompanied the Braves to Milwaukee when the franchise moved in March 1953, but he played in only two games before he sustained a season-ending broken elbow in an exhibition game in June. He then played three more minor league seasons before leaving the game at age 33.

Burris's 43 big-league hits included five doubles as well as his two home runs.
