= Billy Reed (baseball) =

American baseball player (1922-2005)

- Reed in 1952
- Second baseman
- Born: November 12, 1922; Shawano, Wisconsin, U.S.
- Died: December 5, 2005 (aged 83); Houston, Texas, U.S.
- Batted: Left Threw: Right

MLB debut
- April 15, 1952, for the Boston Braves

Last MLB appearance
- May 6, 1952, for the Boston Braves

MLB statistics
- Batting average: .250
- Hits: 13
- Home runs: 0
- Stats at Baseball Reference

Teams
- Boston Braves (1952)

William Joseph Reed (November 12, 1922 – December 5, 2005) was an American Major League Baseball second baseman. He was originally signed by the Philadelphia Phillies in 1946 and later played at the Major League level with the Boston Braves in 1952.

Reed attended the University of Notre Dame.

== Basketball career ==
Reed also played professional basketball. During the winter season in 1946–47, he played for the Oshkosh All-Stars in the National Basketball League and averaged 2.6 points per game.
