= Max Surkont =

American baseball player (1922–1986)

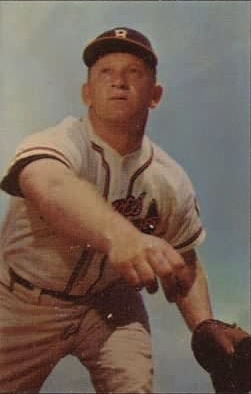
- Surkont in about 1952
- Pitcher
- Born: June 16, 1922; Central Falls, Rhode Island, U.S.
- Died: October 8, 1986 (aged 64); Largo, Florida, U.S.
- Batted: Right Threw: Right

MLB debut
- April 19, 1949, for the Chicago White Sox

Last MLB appearance
- May 1, 1957, for the New York Giants

MLB statistics
- Win–loss record: 61–76
- Earned run average: 4.38
- Strikeouts: 571
- Stats at Baseball Reference

Teams
- Chicago White Sox (1949); Boston Braves / Milwaukee (1950–1953); Pittsburgh Pirates (1954–1956); St. Louis Cardinals (1956); New York Giants (1956–1957)

Matthew Constantine Surkont (June 16, 1922 – October 8, 1986) was an American professional baseball pitcher who played from 1949 through 1957 in the Major Leagues. He played for the Chicago White Sox, Boston / Milwaukee Braves, Pittsburgh Pirates, St. Louis Cardinals, and New York Giants. The nickname Max was given to him by his childhood friends.

== Minor league pitcher ==
A native of Central Falls, Rhode Island, the right-handed Surkont was in the St. Louis Cardinals organization as a major league prospect. He was highly touted in 1942, prior to injuring his arm during spring training. This impeded his advancement throughout the season, as the injury was of a lingering kind. Surkont was sold to the Braves before being returned to the Cardinals after manager Billy Southworth passed on him. He was again shipped to the Rochester Red Wings, where he remained until 1949. Then the Chicago White Sox risked the draft price on Surkont. The team was struggling at the time to emerge from the second division of the American League standings. In 1950, he pitched for the Sacramento Solons of the Pacific Coast League. Sportswriter Jim Cooper wrote on June 12, "Folks are saying that six-foot Max Surkont of the Sacramento Solons is the handiest man tossing the pill in the Pacific Coast League."

== Career highlight ==
Surkont pitched for the Milwaukee Braves in 1953. Against the Cincinnati Reds on May 25, 1953, he recorded eight consecutive strikeouts. Following his seventh straight strikeout, Surkont was forced to endure a thirty-five-minute rain delay. Afterward he struck out Andy Seminick to lead off the fifth inning. Surkont struck out thirteen batters in the game, a 10–3 Braves victory. He was 11–5 for the season and recorded a 61–76 career record. The record stood until Baseball Hall of Fame pitcher, Tom Seaver, struck out ten in a row in 1970.

Surkont was projected to be a top starter for Pittsburgh, where he was traded prior to the 1954 season. It was reported that Surkont ate his way off the Braves' team, having an especial fondness for Polish sausage.
