= Virgil Jester =

American baseball player

- Pitcher
- Born: July 23, 1927; Denver, Colorado, U.S.
- Died: February 15, 2016 (aged 88); Arvada, Colorado, U.S.
- Batted: Right Threw: Right

MLB debut
- June 18, 1952, for the Boston Braves

Last MLB appearance
- April 23, 1953, for the Milwaukee Braves

MLB statistics
- Win–loss record: 3–5
- Earned run average: 3.84
- Complete games: 4
- Shutouts: 1
- Strikeouts: 25
- Stats at Baseball Reference

Teams
- Boston / Milwaukee Braves (1952–1953)

Virgil Milton Jester (July 23, 1927 – February 15, 2016) was an American professional baseball pitcher who appeared in 21 games in Major League Baseball as a member of the Boston / Milwaukee Braves in 1952 and 1953. Born in Denver, Jester threw and batted right-handed and was listed as 5 feet 11 inches (1.80 m) tall and 188 pounds (85 kg). He graduated from North High School and attended the Colorado State College of Education.

Jester signed as a free agent in 1947 with the Boston Braves and worked his way through their farm system for 51/2 years before being recalled in June 1952. After seven appearances as a relief pitcher, he received his first starting assignment in the second game of a doubleheader on July 13 against the cellar-dwelling Pittsburgh Pirates. Jester threw a complete game, 2–1 victory at Forbes Field, allowing seven hits and three bases on balls, with three strikeouts. On August 31, he tossed a three-hit, 1–0 shutout triumph against the Philadelphia Phillies at Braves Field. It was his only MLB shutout.

As a rookie in Boston, he worked in 19 games, won three of eight decisions with four complete games, and compiled a 3.33 earned run average. He remained with the Braves through their move to Milwaukee, Wisconsin, in March 1953 and began that season on the club's 28-man roster. But he was ineffective in two relief appearances and was sent to the minor leagues. He never returned to the majors, playing in the Braves' system through 1954 and then, after a four-year hiatus, getting into 14 games with the 1959 Denver Bears of the Triple-A American Association. He then retired from pro baseball. In his 21-game MLB career, he posted a 3–5 record and a 3.84 career earns run average, permitting 84 hits and 27 bases on balls in 75 career innings pitched; he was credited with 25 strikeouts.

Virgil Jester died from pneumonia in Arvada, Colorado, on February 15, 2016.
