= Johnny Logan (baseball) =

American baseball player (1926–2013)

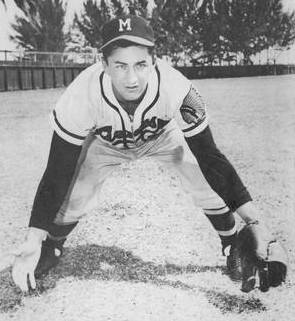
- Shortstop
- Born: March 23, 1926; Endicott, New York, U.S.
- Died: August 9, 2013 (aged 87); Milwaukee, Wisconsin, U.S.
- Batted: Right Threw: Right

Professional debut
- MLB: April 17, 1951, for the Boston Braves
- NPB: March 14, 1964, for the Nankai Hawks

Last appearance
- MLB: September 27, 1963, for the Pittsburgh Pirates
- NPB: October 10, 1964, for the Nankai Hawks

MLB statistics
- Batting average: .268
- Home runs: 93
- Runs batted in: 547

NPB statistics
- Batting average: .189
- Home runs: 7
- Runs batted in: 23
- Stats at Baseball Reference

Teams
- Boston / Milwaukee Braves (1951–1961); Pittsburgh Pirates (1961–1963); Nankai Hawks (1964)

Career highlights and awards
- 4× All-Star (1955, 1957, 1958, 1959²); World Series champion (1957); Japan Series champion (1964); American Family Field Walk of Fame

John Logan, Jr. (March 23, 1926 – August 9, 2013) was an American professional baseball player. He played in Major League Baseball as a shortstop from 1951 to 1963, most prominently as a member of the Boston / Milwaukee Braves, where he was a four-time All-Star player and was a member of the 1957 World Series winning team. After his major league career, he played for one season in the Nippon Professional Baseball League as a member of the Nankai Hawks in 1964.

== Early life ==
Logan grew up in Endicott, New York, and attended Union-Endicott High School, where he was a five-sport star. Endicott has a little league field named after him. Logan was of Russian and Croatian descent. His father John Sr., was from Tsaritsyn, now Volgograd, and his mother, Helen Senko, was born in Croatia, but also lived in the borderland of Poland.

Logan was in the army, where he played baseball, in the latter portions of World War II. He was honorably discharged. While Logan was playing for the minor league Milwaukee Brewers on June 25, 1951, Kansas City Blues catcher Clint Courtney hit him in the face with an elbow while sliding hard into second base, knocking Logan's front two teeth out.

== Career ==
Logan debuted for the Braves in 1951. In 1953, around the time he became an everyday starter, he married Dorothy Ahlmeyer. She lived until 1989 and they had three sons.

Logan had one of his best seasons in 1955, playing in all 154 games, batting .297, leading the league with 37 doubles, and finishing 11th in Most Valuable Player voting. He received his first of four All-Star selections that year. In the 1957 World Series, Logan hit the first home run of the series in a Game 2 victory over the New York Yankees.

Traded to the Pittsburgh Pirates in June 1961 for Gino Cimoli, Logan played in no more than 81 games for the Pirates before they released him following the 1963 season.

In a 13-season career, Logan was a lifetime .268 batter with 93 home runs and 547 RBIs in 1503 games. He has a total of 651 career runs scored and 19 stolen bases. He accumulated 216 doubles and 41 triples with a total of 1407 hits in 5244 career at bats. After his major league career, Logan played one season in Japan for the Nankai Hawks in 1964, where he became the first player to win both a World Series and a Japan Series.

Pitcher Sal Maglie described Logan as a fastball hitter.

== Later life ==
After he retired, Logan lived in Milwaukee. He was involved in the founding of the Milwaukee Braves Historical Association, and he often visited Miller Park for Brewers games. He died at a hospital in Milwaukee on August 9, 2013, age 87. He had suffered from problems with his circulation and his kidneys late in life, and he required a wheelchair. An infection was a contributing factor in his death.

== See also ==
- List of Major League Baseball annual doubles leaders
