= Lew Burdette =

American baseball player (1926–2007)

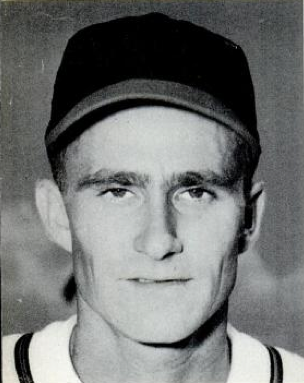
- Burdette in 1954
- Pitcher
- Born: November 22, 1926; Nitro, West Virginia, U.S.
- Died: February 6, 2007 (aged 80); Winter Garden, Florida, U.S.
- Batted: Right Threw: Right

MLB debut
- September 26, 1950, for the New York Yankees

Last MLB appearance
- July 16, 1967, for the California Angels

MLB statistics
- Win–loss record: 203–144
- Earned run average: 3.66
- Strikeouts: 1,074
- Stats at Baseball Reference

Teams
- New York Yankees (1950); Boston / Milwaukee Braves (1951–1963); St. Louis Cardinals (1963–1964); Chicago Cubs (1964–1965); Philadelphia Phillies (1965); California Angels (1966–1967)

Career highlights and awards
- 2× All-Star (1957, 1959); World Series champion (1957); World Series MVP (1957); NL wins leader (1959); NL ERA leader (1956); Pitched a no-hitter on August 18, 1960; Braves Hall of Fame; American Family Field Walk of Fame

Selva Lewis Burdette, Jr. (November 22, 1926 – February 6, 2007) was an American right-handed starting pitcher in Major League Baseball who played primarily for the Boston / Milwaukee Braves. The team's top right-hander during its years in Milwaukee, he was the Most Valuable Player of the 1957 World Series, leading the franchise to its first championship in 43 years, and the only title in Milwaukee Braves history. An outstanding control pitcher, his career average of 1.84 walks per nine innings pitched places him behind only Robin Roberts (1.73), Greg Maddux (1.80), Carl Hubbell, (1.82) and Juan Marichal (1.82) among pitchers with at least 3,000 innings since 1920.

== Major League career ==
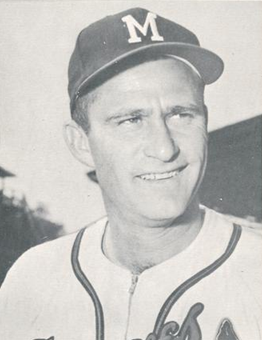
1958 photo of Burdette for Milwaukee Braves

Born in Nitro, West Virginia, Burdette was signed by the New York Yankees in 1947, and after making two relief appearances for the team in September 1950, he was traded to the Braves in August 1951 for four-time 20-game winner Johnny Sain. Along with left-hander Warren Spahn and right-hander Bob Buhl, he gave the Braves one of the best starting rotations in the majors during the 1950s, winning 15 or more games eight times between 1953 and 1961. Burdette led National League pitchers in earned run average in 1956. When Milwaukee won the 1957 World Series against the Yankees, Burdette became the first pitcher in 37 years to win three complete games in a series, and the first since Christy Mathewson in 1905 to pitch two shutouts (Games 5 and 7), starting Game 7 after Games 1 and 4 starter Warren Spahn was stricken by the flu. In the 1958 Series, however, the Yankees defeated Burdette twice in three starts. The final setback came in Game 7, which he again started on only two days' rest, a decision for which manager Fred Haney was widely criticized. In addition to winning 20 games in 1958 and tying Spahn for the National League lead with 21 victories in 1959, Burdette won 19 in 1956 and 1960, 18 in 1961, and 17 in 1957.

Burdette was the winning pitcher on May 26, 1959 when the Pittsburgh Pirates' Harvey Haddix pitched a perfect game against the Braves for 12 innings, only to lose in the 13th. Burdette threw a 1–0 shutout, scattering 12 hits. In the ensuing offseason, he joked, "I'm the greatest pitcher that ever lived. The greatest game that was ever pitched in baseball wasn't good enough to beat me, so I've got to be the greatest!"

On August 18 of the following year, facing the minimum 27 batters, Burdette no-hit the Philadelphia Phillies 1–0 at Milwaukee County Stadium. Tony González, the only opposing batter to reach base after being hit by a pitch in the fifth inning, was retired on a double play. Burdette helped himself by scoring the only run of the game; after doubling to lead off the eighth inning, he scored on Bill Bruton's double one batter later. Following up his no-hitter, five days later he pitched his third shutout in a row.

In 1963 Burdette was traded to the St. Louis Cardinals (1963–1964), and was later sent to the Chicago Cubs (1964–1965) and Phillies (1965). Signing with the California Angels, he pitched exclusively in relief for the team in 1966 and 1967 before retiring.

== Career statistics ==
In an 18-year career, Burdette posted a 203–144 record with 1,074 strikeouts and a 3.66 ERA in 3,067.1 innings, compiling 158 complete games and 33 shutouts. In two All-Star games, he allowed only one run in seven innings pitched, and in 1956 he topped National League pitchers with a 2.70 earned run average. He was twice a 20-game winner and twice led the National League in shutouts. He also led the National League in wins, earned run average, innings and complete games once each. His totals of wins, games and innings with the Braves ranked behind only Spahn and Kid Nichols in franchise history. He won his only NL Player of the Month award in August 1958 (7–1, 1.89 ERA, 38 SO); teammate pitcher Joey Jay had won the award the month previous. As a hitter, he compiled a .183 batting average (185-for-1,011) with 75 RBI and 12 home runs; his first two home runs came in the same 1957 game, and he later had two more two-homer games. He also hit a home run in Game 2 of the 1958 World Series, being the first pitcher to do so since Bucky Walters in 1940.

== Pitching style ==
Burdette was a very fidgety pitcher, constantly scratching himself and fussing with his uniform before pitches. Former manager Fred Haney once said, "Burdette would make coffee nervous." Frequently repeated motions such as bringing his fingers to his lips and wiping sweat from his forehead led to rumors of throwing spitballs. After the second game of the 1957 season, Birdie Tebbetts, manager of the Cincinnati Reds, called Burdette a "cheating spitballer," prompting Redlegs' GM Gabe Paul to lodge an official protest with the National League. NL President Warren Giles responded with a statement clarifying that it was okay for a pitcher to moisten his hands as long as he did not transfer the moisture to the baseball and said, "Until someone—the umpires or someone—presents evidence that Burdette is using the spitter, I'll do nothing about it." Burdette himself said, "It's the best pitch I've got—and I don't throw it." The rumors persisted, though: Don Hoak said, "Only once did I ever see water fly off a spitball, and the man who threw me that pitch was Burdette." The Sporting News wrote in 1967, "Perhaps no pitcher has engendered more controversy about the spitter than Lou Burdette." New York Times sportswriter Red Smith wrote, "There should be 3 pitching statistics for Burdette: Wins, Losses, and Relative Humidity." Burdette himself referenced this reputation, saying he retired because "they were starting to hit the dry side of the ball."

== Personal life ==
Burdette was inducted into the Florida Sports Hall of Fame in 1998 and the West Virginia Sports Hall of Fame in 1974. He died of lung cancer at age 80 in Winter Garden, Florida.

In 1958, a reference to Burdette appeared in an episode of Leave It to Beaver. The text "Lew Burdette just hit a home run and Milwaukee leads seven to one in the series," appears briefly in a few frames showing a letter from the principal to Beaver's parents. Burdette also released a single in 1958 with two Rockabilly songs "Three Strikes and You're Out" on the A side, and "Mary Lou" on the B side.

Burdette's grandson, Nolan Fontana, was a professional baseball player and appeared in MLB for the Los Angeles Angels for parts of two seasons.

== Highlights ==
- Two-time All-Star (1957, 1959)
- Third in Cy Young Award voting (1958)
- Led league in wins (1959)
- Led league in games started (1959)
- Led league in complete games (1960)
- Twice led league in shutouts (1956, 1959)
- 5 times in top 4 in wins (1956–1958, 1960–1961)
- World Series MVP (1957)
- Player of the Month for August 1958

== See also ==
- List of Major League Baseball career wins leaders
- List of Major League Baseball annual ERA leaders
- List of Major League Baseball annual wins leaders
- List of Major League Baseball no-hitters

Awards
Preceded by Joey Jay	Major League Player of the Month; August 1958	Succeeded by Willie Mays
Achievements
Preceded by Don Cardwell	No-hitter pitcher August 18, 1960	Succeeded by Warren Spahn
Sporting positions
Preceded by Harry Dorish	Atlanta Braves pitching coach 1972–1973	Succeeded by Herm Starrette
