= Jack Dittmer =

American football player (1928–2014)

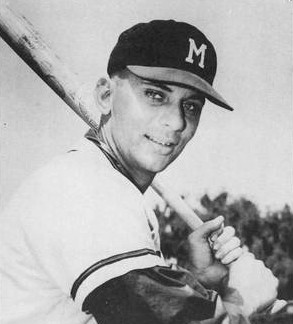
- Second baseman
- Born: January 10, 1928; Elkader, Iowa, U.S.
- Died: May 31, 2014 (aged 86); Strawberry Point, Iowa, U.S.
- Batted: Left Threw: Right

MLB debut
- June 17, 1952, for the Boston Braves

Last MLB appearance
- June 23, 1957, for the Detroit Tigers

MLB statistics
- Batting average: .232
- Home runs: 24
- Runs batted in: 136
- Stats at Baseball Reference

Teams
- Boston / Milwaukee Braves (1952–1956); Detroit Tigers (1957)

John Douglas Dittmer (January 10, 1928 – May 31, 2014) was an American Major League Baseball second baseman. He played six seasons in the majors, from 1952 until 1957, for the Boston / Milwaukee Braves and Detroit Tigers.

As an amateur, Dittmer was a three-sport star at Elkader High School, where he played basketball, baseball, and football. In Dittmer's senior year of high school, he was selected the best high-school baseball player in the state of Iowa, and he went on to play in a National All-star Game. He continued to play all three sports at the University of Iowa, where he was mainly known as a wide receiver. Dittmer was inducted into the University of Iowa Athletics Hall of Fame in 1993.
