= Sid Gordon =

American baseball player (1917–1975)

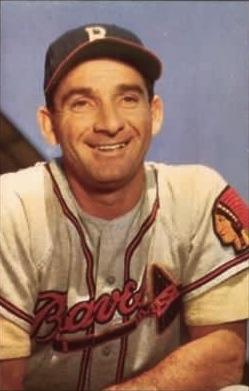
- Left fielder / Third baseman
- Born: August 13, 1917; Brooklyn, New York, U.S.
- Died: June 17, 1975 (aged 57); New York City, New York, U.S.
- Batted: Right Threw: Right

MLB debut
- September 11, 1941, for the New York Giants

Last MLB appearance
- September 20, 1955, for the New York Giants

MLB statistics
- Batting average: .283
- Home runs: 202
- Runs batted in: 805
- Stats at Baseball Reference

Teams
- New York Giants (1941–1943, 1946–1949); Boston / Milwaukee Braves (1950–1953); Pittsburgh Pirates (1954–1955); New York Giants (1955)

Career highlights and awards
- 2× All-Star (1948, 1949)

Sidney Gordon (August 13, 1917 – June 17, 1975) was an American right-handed Major League Baseball two-time All-Star outfielder, third baseman, and first baseman.

He had a 13-year career in MLB for the New York Giants (1941–43, 1946–49, and 1955), Boston / Milwaukee Braves (1950–53), and Pittsburgh Pirates (1954–55). Gordon was one of the Giants' most popular players. In the majors he batted .283, hitting 202 home runs, and batting in 805 runs. In three different years he homered at least once in every park in which he played. A slugger, he also had a great eye—he drew 731 walks, against only 356 strikeouts.

Harold Ribalow in his book The Jew in American Sports referred to Gordon as the "Solid Man".

== Early life ==
Gordon was born in the Brownsville section of Brooklyn, and was Jewish. His parents were Morris and Rose (née Meyerson) Gordon. Morris emigrated from Russia, and became a plumber and a coal dealer in the United States. Eventually, the family moved to the Flatbush section of Brooklyn.

Gordon went to Samuel J. Tilden High School, where he was a star baseball player. In 1936, the year he graduated from Tilden, Gordon's high school coach arranged for Gordon to work out for Casey Stengel, then manager of the Dodgers. Stengel liked what he saw, but soon after the Dodgers fired Stengel.

Gordon attended Long Island University's Brooklyn campus.

Gordon kept playing in sandlot baseball, where he was noticed by scout George Mack of the Giants. In January 1938, he was signed as undrafted amateur free agent by the Giants, and Mack sent Gordon to the Milford Giants in Milford, Delaware, in the Eastern Shore Baseball League.

== Minor leagues ==
At Milford in 1938, Gordon was put at third base, an unfamiliar position, but responded with a .352 average and 25 homers, while playing every game. Gordon led the league in hits (145), total bases (256), and triples (9).

In 1939 Gordon played in Three-I League with the Clinton Giants. He batted .327 and hit 24 triples. In 1941 he hit .304 and stole 15 bases in the International League.

At the end of the 1941 season, the Giants brought him up. Wanting to get Gordon more experience as an outfielder, manager Bill Terry sent Gordon to the Jersey City Giants in 1942, where he hit .300.

== Major Leagues ==
=== NY Giants (1941–43) ===
On September 11, 1941, he appeared in his first major league game. The Giants put four Jewish players on the field: Gordon and Morrie Arnovich in the outfield, Harry Feldman on the mound, and Harry Danning behind the plate.

Gordon's first full year in the majors came in 1943; he hit only .251, but with 32 strikeouts and 43 walks showed discipline at the plate. He also hit 11 triples, 5th in the league.

=== World War II (1944–45) ===
With World War II raging, Gordon spent 1944 and 1945 in the Coast Guard. Bill James listed Gordon as a player who may have lost a shot at the Hall of Fame due to World War II, writing "there are guys in the Hall of Fame who didn't have careers as good as Gordon's, and Sid missed two full seasons due to the war."

=== NY Giants (1946–49) ===
Returning to baseball after the war, he was 10th in the league in on-base percentage (.380) in 1946.

In 1947 he hit 8 triples, 6th highest in the league, and a career-high 13 outfield assists. The Giants broke the single-season home run record, and Gordon hit 13 of their 221. Giant manager Mel Ott had put together a one-dimensional ball club built around a lot of sluggers with little speed. Leo Durocher famously observed that Ott was too nice a guy, and his team would finish last. Durocher listed a number of players who he thought were nice guys, Gordon among them.

In 1948 Gordon changed his approach to hitting under the guidance of Giant coach Red Kress. As Gordon recalled, "Before 1948 I could hit a fairly long ball, but it always went to right or right-center. At the Polo Grounds, right-center is just a big out. Red Kress, a coach on the Giants, used to get me to pull the ball to left. He started out by moving my right-hand grip on the bat around a little and he opened up my stance – I now put my left foot toward third when I hit. I learned to roll my wrists more and to step into the ball. Pretty soon I was dropping them in left. Red spent hours working with me on it. I can't give him enough credit."

In 1948 Gordon was 3rd in the National League in slugging percentage (.537), 4th in RBIs (107), 5th in home runs (30; a career high) and at-bats per home run (17.4), 6th in runs (100; a career high) and total bases (280), 8th in batting average (.299), 9th in walks (74) and OBP (.390), and 10th in stolen bases (8). He was voted onto the All-Star team for his first time. The Giants held "Sid Gordon Day" at the Polo Grounds, and he received a new car, golf clubs, and a set of luggage. July 3 was also dubbed "Sid Gordon Day" at Ebbets Field, marking a rare honor for a visiting player. He finished 4th in voting for the 1948 National League MVP.

After his breakout 1948 season, Gordon held out in the spring of 1949. He signed for $2,500 ($33,800 today) less than he wanted. In 1949 he was 4th in the league in at-bats-per-home run (18.8), 5th in home runs (26) and walks (95; a career high), 6th in OBP (.404), and 9th in slugging percentage (.505). In 1949 he homered twice in one inning, tying a major league record that still stands. He was voted onto the All-Star team for the second year in a row. He finished 30th in voting for the 1949 NL MVP.

=== Boston / Milwaukee Braves (1950–53) ===
When Durocher took over in late 1949, he wanted speed and a good double play combination. In December 1949 he traded Willard Marshall, Red Webb, Buddy Kerr, and nice guy Gordon to the Boston Braves for Alvin Dark and Eddie Stanky. The deal having been consummated, Giants owner Horace Stoneham told him that "it broke my heart to let you go," and sent Gordon a check for $2,500 as a token of his respect for the popular slugger.

In 1950, he had a good year, finishing 4th in the league in slugging percentage (.557), 6th in at-bats per home runs (17.8), 7th in obp (.403), 8th in batting average (.304) and doubles (33), and 9th in home runs (27) and RBIs (103), and 10th in walks (78). He also hit 4 grand slams, tying what was then the major league record. While he hit only 5 home runs at home, he hit 22 on the road; the 17 home run disparity tied for the greatest disparity ever in one season at the time. He finished 22nd in voting for the 1950 NL MVP.

Playing for Boston in 1951 and 1952, he moved with them to Milwaukee in 1953.

In 1951 he finished 2nd in the league in RBIs (109; a career high), 8th in the league in home runs (29), runs (96), and at-bats per home runs (19.0), and 9th in slugging percentage (.500) and walks (80). On August 11 he hit a home run in a doubleheader, the first major league games to be telecast in color. He finished 16th in voting for the 1951 NL MVP.

In 1952 he finished 4th in the league in home runs (25) and at-bats per home run (20.9), 7th in obp (.384) and slugging percentage (.483), and 8th in walks (77). He finished 30th in voting for the 1952 NL MVP.

=== Pittsburgh Pirates (1954–55) ===
In December 1953 he was traded by the Braves with Larry Lasalle, Fred Walters, Curt Raydon, Sam Jethroe, Max Surkont, and cash to the Pittsburgh Pirates for infielder Danny O'Connell. It was the only six-for-one trade in major league history, and was surpassed years later only by the 7-for-1 deal that sent Vida Blue from Oakland to San Francisco in 1978. He hit .306 for the Pirates in 1954.

=== NY Giants (1955) ===
In 1955, as the 9th-oldest player in the league, he was back with the Giants, where he ended his baseball career.

Through 2010, he was third in career home runs (behind Shawn Green), fourth in RBIs (behind Buddy Myer), and sixth in hits (behind Brad Ausmus) among all-time Jewish major league baseball players.

== Jewish heritage ==
A well-liked and highly regarded person wherever he traveled, Gordon was nevertheless subjected to a stark case of anti-Semitism. One day in June 1949 in St. Louis the Cardinals' bench was all over him, hurling antisemitic remarks at him. But Cards manager Eddie Dyer said, "Sid is a friend of mine", and that Gordon had been attacked not because he was Jewish but because he was a good player and "the good ones receive the attention of bench jockeys." Gordon for his part took the high road, ignoring the antisemitic remarks and forcing the bigots to admire him.

Gordon is fourth all-time in home runs by Jewish baseball players (behind Hank Greenberg, Shawn Green and Ryan Braun), fourth in RBIs (behind Greenberg, Braun and Green) and fourth in hits (behind Green, Greenberg and Brad Ausmus).

== Honors ==
- Member of the National Jewish Sports Hall of Fame (2004).
- Inducted into the International Jewish Sports Hall of Fame (2010).

== Personal life ==
Gordon married his high school sweetheart Mary Goldberg in 1940. They had two sons, Michael and Richard. Michael was a catcher in the minors from 1963 to 1965.

== Death ==
Gordon was playing softball in Central Park in New York on June 17, 1975, when he had a heart attack. Taken to Lenox Hill Hospital, he died several hours later. He was 57 years old. His wife Mary and two sons survived him. He was buried at the New Montefiore Cemetery in Farmingdale, New York.

== See also ==
- List of Jewish Major League Baseball players
