= Lou Perini =

American sports team owner

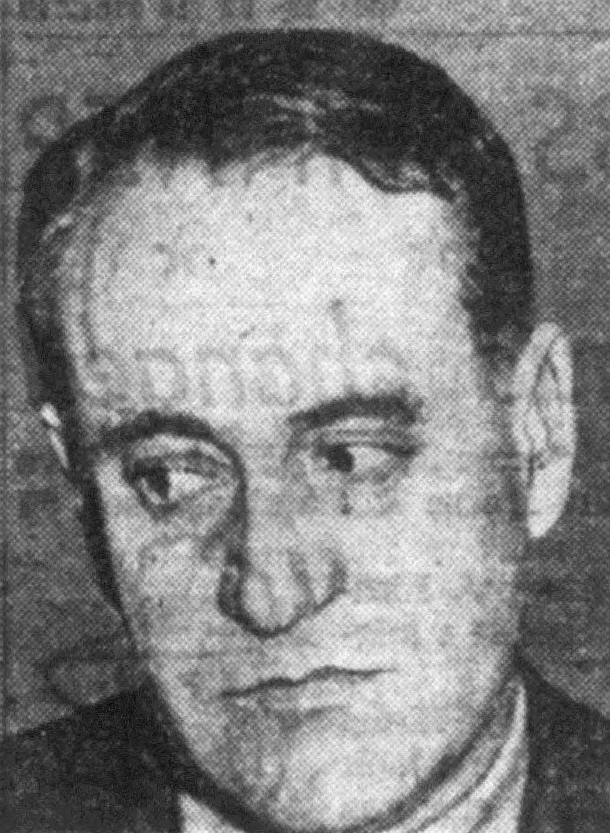
- Perini, circa 1954
- Born: Louis Robert Perini; November 29, 1903; Ashland, Massachusetts, U.S.
- Died: April 16, 1972 (aged 68); West Palm Beach, Florida, U.S.
- Occupations: construction firm owner, sports executive
- Known for: Perini Corporation owner Boston / Milwaukee Braves owner

Louis Robert Perini (November 29, 1903 in Ashland, Massachusetts – April 16, 1972 in West Palm Beach, Florida) was the principal owner of the Boston / Milwaukee Braves of the National League from 1945 through 1962.

In 1945, he purchased the club from Bob Quinn for $500,000 and the club won the National League pennant in 1948, but lost the World Series in six games. Performance of the club then tailed off, accompanied by poor attendance and revenue. In March 1953, Perini moved the club to Milwaukee, Wisconsin, and the club set the NL attendance record that first season and continued to increase. The Braves won two NL pennants in Milwaukee, in 1957 and 1958, and played the New York Yankees in the World Series twice, winning the first. They also tied for a third straight league title in 1959, but fell in the playoff series to the Los Angeles Dodgers.

At the completion of the 1962 season, he sold the franchise for $5.5 million to a Chicago group led by 34-year-old insurance executive William Bartholomay, who later moved the franchise to Atlanta for the 1966 season. Perini retained a 10% interest in the club and sat on the board of directors for a number of years.

Prior to owning the Braves, Perini gained his fortune in his family's construction business in Boston, Perini Corp, having started out his working life as a water boy in his father's small construction firm, ending up running the major worldwide Perini Corporation.
