= Milwaukee Braves =

Professional baseball team in Milwaukee, 1953 to 1965

Logo	Cap insignia

Information
- League: National League (1953–1965)
- Ballpark: Milwaukee County Stadium (1953–1965)
- Established: 1953
- Relocated: 1966 (to Atlanta; became the Atlanta Braves)
- World Series championships: 1: 1957
- National League pennants: 2: 1957; 1958
- Colors: Navy blue, scarlet red, gold, white (Note: The team's official colors are navy blue and scarlet red, according to the team's mascot (Blooper)'s official website.)
- Retired numbers: 21; 35; 41; 44
- Ownership: List of owners: Lou Perini (1953–1962); William Bartholomay (1963–1965)
- General manager: List of general managers: John Quinn (1955–1958); John McHale (1959–1965)
- Manager: List of managers: Charlie Grimm (1955–1956); Fred Haney (1956–1959); Chuck Dressen (1960–1961); Birdie Tebbetts (1961–1962); Bobby Bragan (1963–1965)

The Milwaukee Braves were a Major League Baseball team that played in Milwaukee, from 1953 to 1965, having previously played in Boston, Massachusetts, as the Boston Braves. After relocating to Atlanta, Georgia in 1966, they were renamed the Atlanta Braves. The 13-season tenure in Milwaukee at Milwaukee County Stadium saw varying degrees of success for the franchise, winning the 1957 World Series and the National League pennant in 1958. The team never finished with a losing record.

The Milwaukee Braves had an overall win–loss record of 1,146–890–8 (.563) during their 13 years in Milwaukee. Three former Milwaukee Braves players were elected to the National Baseball Hall of Fame.

== History ==
=== Relocation from Boston ===
Construction began on Milwaukee County Stadium in 1950 in hopes of both luring a Major League baseball team, as well as the Green Bay Packers of the National Football League. The minor league Milwaukee Brewers were scheduled to begin play at the start of the 1953 season.

However, in the first move of a Major League team in half a century, on March 18, 1953, the National League approved owner Lou Perini's move of the Boston Braves to Milwaukee 8–0 because of his "fine standing" with the other owners and also because there was an open city for his minor league team then in Milwaukee. The minor league Brewers moved to Toledo, Ohio, and changed their name to the Mudhens. The full AP quote about fine standing: "Warren Giles, National League president, repeated again and again that 'Perini's fine standing with the other club owners was the most important reason for their approval.'"

Milwaukee County gave the Braves a favorable stadium deal. For the first two years, the team would pay only $1,000 a year for the use of Milwaukee County Stadium. For the next three years, the team would pay 5% of ticket prices and concessions. After that, the rent would be negotiated afresh, with the Braves being required to open their books.

=== 1953–1959: World Series and near-successes ===
Milwaukee went wild over the Braves, who were welcomed as genuine heroes. The Braves finished 92–62 (.597) in their first season in Milwaukee, and drew a then-NL record 1.8 million fans. The success of the team was noted by many owners. Not coincidentally, the Philadelphia Athletics, St. Louis Browns, Brooklyn Dodgers, and New York Giants all relocated over the next five years.

As the 1950s progressed, the reinvigorated Braves became increasingly competitive. Sluggers Eddie Mathews and Hank Aaron drove the offense (they would hit a combined 1,226 home runs as Braves, with 850 of those coming while the franchise was in Milwaukee), while Warren Spahn, Lew Burdette, and Bob Buhl anchored the rotation.

==== 1953 ====
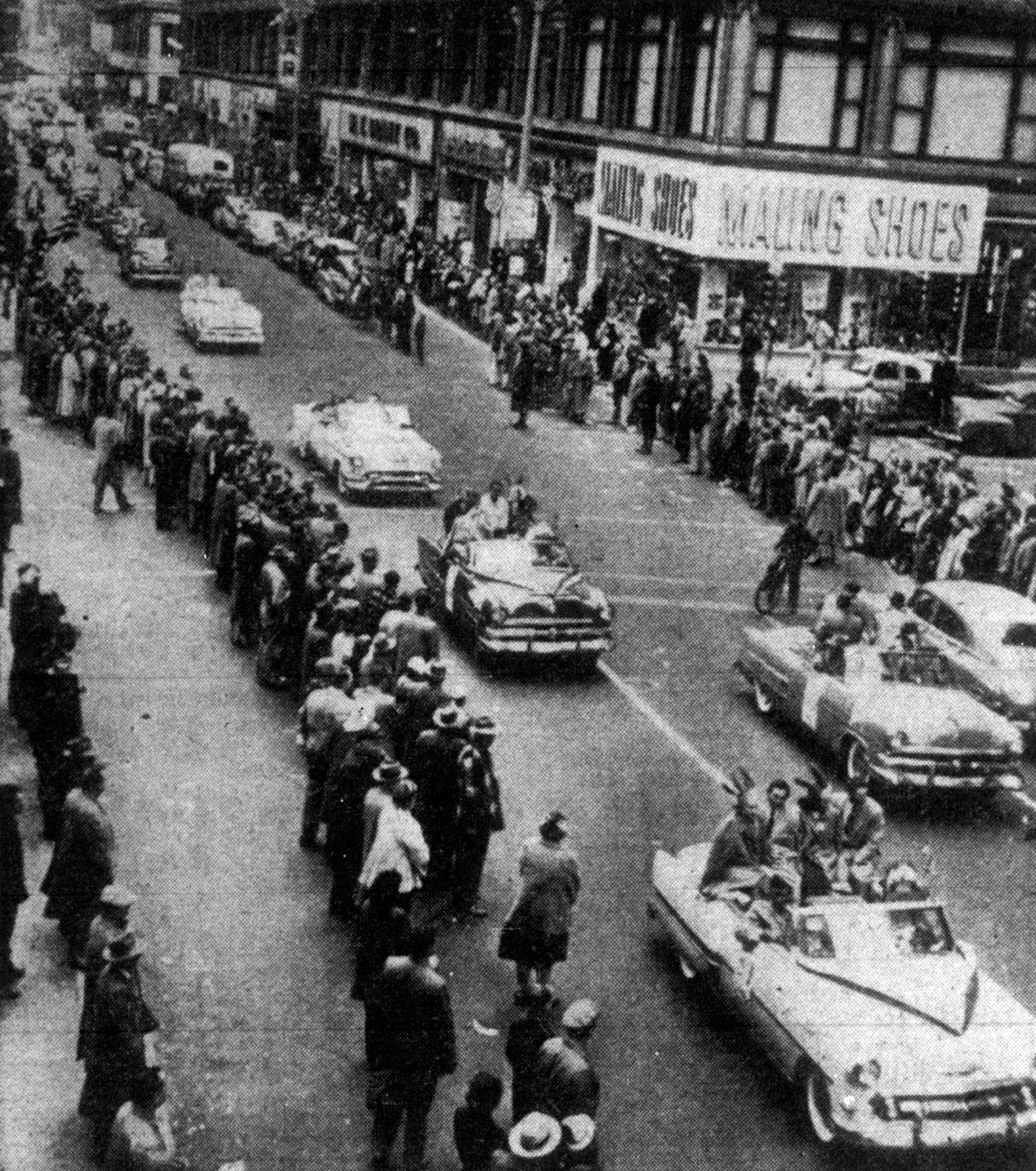
Residents of Milwaukee line the streets to welcome the arrival of the Braves franchise on April 8, 1953.

In the inaugural season of the Braves in Milwaukee, the team found success early on. For the latter half of May and most of June, the Braves held a narrow lead in the National League. By the June 15 trade deadline, the team was 37–18 (.673) and 0 games behind the Brooklyn Dodgers, who were only ahead by percentage points, with a record of 36–17 (.679). Their widest lead was on June 23 and 24, 3 games over the Dodgers, though the team would quickly lose their lead just 3 days later and never recovered. The Dodgers went on to outperform the rest of the league as the Braves finished in second, at 92–62 (.597) and 13 games behind.

==== 1954 ====
The sophomore season of the Braves in Milwaukee saw less success than the previous season. Though the team went on a 10-game win streak towards the end of May, they only led the National League for the last week of May, at most 1½ games ahead. Following a losing record in June, the team never recovered, and dropped to 15½ games behind on July 14 and 21. The team would remain in third place for almost the entirety of the remaining season, even when a 9-game win streak put the team only 3½ games behind the eventual World Series winning New York Giants by August 15. The team finished the season 89–65 (.578) and 8 games behind.

==== 1955 ====
The 1955 team saw even less success than the previous season under new general manager John Quinn and new manager Charlie Grimm. By May 28, the team was 10½ games behind, and would never be closer than 10 games behind for the remainder of the season, even though they held second place in the National League from July 7 until the season's end, trailing the eventual World Series winning Brooklyn Dodgers. The team finished the season 85–69 (.552) and 13½ games behind.

==== 1956 ====
Under opening day manager Charlie Grimm, the Braves got off to a mediocre start at 24–22 (.522). After a loss on Saturday, June 16, the owners dismissed him and replaced him with Fred Haney, who led the Braves to a 68–40 (.630) record for the rest of the season, leading for the majority of the season. For the second half of July, all of August, and most of September, the Braves held a small lead in the National League, in a tight race with the Brooklyn Dodgers and Cincinnati Redlegs. Going into the last series of the season, the Braves held a ½ game lead over the Dodgers. In losing the series 1–2 to the St. Louis Cardinals, they choked the season and finished at 92–62 (.597), 1 game behind the Dodgers, who finished at 93–61 (.604).

==== 1957 ====
The first half of the 1957 season saw the Braves in-and-out of first place, mostly between them and the Cincinnati Redlegs and St. Louis Cardinals. August 7 saw the Braves take the first place in the National League, a lead they would hold for the rest of the season, finishing at 95–59 (.617). The team celebrated their first pennant in nine years. Spearheaded by Hank Aaron's MVP season, he led the National League in home runs and RBI. Perhaps the most memorable of his 44 round-trippers that season came on September 23, a two-run walk-off home run that gave the Braves a 4–2 victory over the St. Louis Cardinals and clinched the league championship. The team drew over 2.2 million at home during the regular season, then went on to its first World Series win in over 40 years, defeating the New York Yankees of Yogi Berra, Mickey Mantle, and Whitey Ford in seven games. Burdette, the Series MVP, threw three complete game victories, giving up only two earned runs, including the seventh game in New York, a 5–0 shutout.

==== 1958 ====
The first half of the 1958 season saw the Braves in-and-out of first place, mostly between them and the newly relocated San Francisco Giants. The Braves would secure first place for the rest of the season from July 30, finishing the season 92–62 (.597), 8 games ahead, securing their second consecutive National League pennant. In the World Series, the Braves jumped out to a three games to one lead in against New York once more, thanks in part to the strength of Warren Spahn's and Lew Burdette's pitching. But the Yankees stormed back to take the last three games, the last two in Milwaukee, in large part to World Series MVP Bob Turley, the winning pitcher in games five and seven.

==== 1959 ====
The 1959 season, under new general manager John McHale, saw a tight three-way race between the Braves, Los Angeles Dodgers, San Francisco Giants for the pennant race. The Braves led the National League in May and June, whereas in July and August, the team hovered at its worst, 4½ games behind. The three-way race continued into the last week of September, when the Giants fell off (having led in July and August). By the season's end, both the Braves and Dodgers were tied at 86–68 (.558), resulting in a regular season best-of-three tie-breaker series to determine the winner of the pennant.

Many residents of Chicago and Milwaukee were hoping for a White Sox–Braves World Series, as the cities are only about 75 miles (120 km) apart along the west shore of Lake Michigan. However, it was not to be. Though consistently behind both the Braves and Giants all season, the Dodgers won the league title with two straight wins against the Braves, ending the Braves' pennant streak at two. The Dodgers would go on to defeat the White Sox in six games in the World Series. The Braves finished their season at 86–70 (.551).

=== 1960–1965: Declining attendance ===
The next six years were up-and-down for the Braves. The Braves were somewhat mediocre as the 1960s began but fattened up on the expansion New York Mets and Houston Colt .45s (now the American League Astros) starting in 1962.

==== 1960 ====
The 1960 season under new manager Chuck Dressen saw the Braves somewhat fall of from the previous season, but for vast majority of the season, the team would place in second or third, always within 8 games behind. The closest the team was to leading was on July 24, when they were at 52–36 (.591) and 0 games ahead of the Pittsburgh Pirates, though were ahead by percentage (the Pirates were at 53–37 (.589)). From August 6 on, the Braves were consistently between 5 and 8 games behind and finished the season in second place at 88–66 (.571), 7 games behind the World Series winning Pittsburgh Pirates. Two players threw no-hitters against the Philadelphia Phillies: Lew Burdette on August 18 and Warren Spahn on September 16. Milwaukee's home attendance slipped under 1.5 million for the first time since the move from Boston.

==== 1961 ====
The 1961 season saw the Braves hover around fourth and fifth for most of the season. After the June 15 trade deadline, the Braves would be consistently between 6 and 14½ games behind, eventually finishing the season in fourth place, at 83–71 (.539), 10 games behind the Cincinnati Reds. Warren Spahn threw his 300th career victory on August 11 and threw his second no-hitter, this time against the San Francisco Giants on April 28. After the game on September 2, manager Chuck Dressen was replaced by Birdie Tebbetts. The team's home attendance continued its decline; the last season exceeding one million was in 1961.

==== 1962 ====
The 1962 season saw the Braves consistently in sixth place from mid-May through mid-September. Before July 22, the team had a negative record, though after this date would have a positive record for the remainder of the season. The team finished the season in fifth at 86–76 (.531), 15½ games behind the San Francisco Giants. Hank Aaron his Milwaukee career high 45 home runs. Attendance fell off significantly below the previous season, falling below 800,000.

==== 1963 ====
The 1963 season was the first under the ownership of William Bartholomay and new manager Bobby Bragan. The Braves performed slightly worse than the previous season. After the All-Star break, the Braves were consistently between 7 and 16 games behind, finishing the season in sixth at 84–78 (.519), 15 games behind the World Series winning Los Angeles Dodgers. This would be the only season that the Milwaukee Braves finished "second division", having placed in the lower half of the league. Hank Aaron hit 44 home runs and notched 130 RBI, and Warren Spahn was once again the ace of the staff. There was a slight uptick in attendance, though still below 800,000.

==== 1964 ====
The 1964 season saw the Braves slightly improve from the previous season. By the All-Star break, the team was 2 games under .500, in seventh place. For the remainder of the season, the Braves were consistently between 5 and 14½ games behind while consistently in fifth or sixth place. The Braves finished the season in fifth at 88–74 (.543), 5 games behind the World Series winning St. Louis Cardinals. Despite the consistently lower performance to the previous two seasons, attendance saw a large uptick to over 900,000.

==== 1965 ====
An injunction filed in Wisconsin blocked the Braves from moving to Atlanta for the 1965 season, but attendance plummeted to 555,000. The team saw the Braves perform slightly worse than the previous season. However, in the months of June and August, the team was largely in second place behind the Los Angeles Dodgers by only a few games, having led the National League only on August 18 and 20 by only ½ games ahead. Outside these months, the team hovered between fourth and fifth place. The Braves finished the season in fifth at 86–76 (.531), 11 games behind the World Series winning Dodgers.

=== Relocation to Atlanta ===
Lou Perini sold the Braves to a Chicago-based group led by William Bartholomay after the 1962 season. The ink had barely dried on the deal when Bartholomay started shopping the Braves to a larger television market. At the same time, the fast-growing city of Atlanta, led by Mayor Ivan Allen, Jr., constructed a new $18 million, 52,007–60,606 seat multi-purpose stadium in less than one year, Atlanta Stadium (later on known as Atlanta–Fulton County Stadium from 1976 until 1996 with its demolition in 1997), which was officially opened in 1965 in hopes of luring an existing major league and/or NFL/AFL team.

After the city failed to lure the Kansas City Athletics (who moved to Oakland in 1968), Allen courted the Braves, who announced their intention to move to Atlanta for the 1965 season. However, an injunction filed in Wisconsin forced the Braves to play a lame-duck season in Milwaukee, but the home attendance was less than 560,000. In the interim, Atlanta Stadium played host to the Braves' new Triple-A affiliate, the Atlanta Crackers of the International League. The Braves had bought the Crackers in order to secure the major-league rights to the Atlanta area; in those days, the owner of a minor-league team also owned the major league rights to that city.

The Braves completed the move to Atlanta prior to the 1966 season, and drew over 1.5 million in the new stadium that first year. Before that season, they moved the Crackers to Richmond, Virginia as the Richmond Braves.

== Legacy ==
Following the team's departure from Milwaukee after the 1965 season, the city was quickly considered for expansion, as stated by Commissioner of Baseball William Eckert in May 1966, citing that expansion would occur in "eight to 10 years." However, by 1968, Milwaukee was rejected for expansion due to its close proximity to Chicago.

As early as June 1969, an MLB memo envisaged the newly founded Seattle Pilots of the American League moving to Milwaukee. Concerns for the Pilots' viability led to several attempts to relocate the team to Milwaukee, which lead to Pilots owner Dewey Soriano to try and sell the team. Following failed attempts to sell to former Braves minority owner Bud Selig and several deals involving Westin Hotels head Eddie Carlson, and bankruptcy of the team on March 31—seven days before Opening Day—the team was sold to Selig and the team was moved to Milwaukee as the Milwaukee Brewers. The National League's 32-year hiatus from the city would end in 1998 when the Brewers were transferred to the National League due to realignment resulting from the 1998 Major League Baseball expansion.

== Uniforms ==
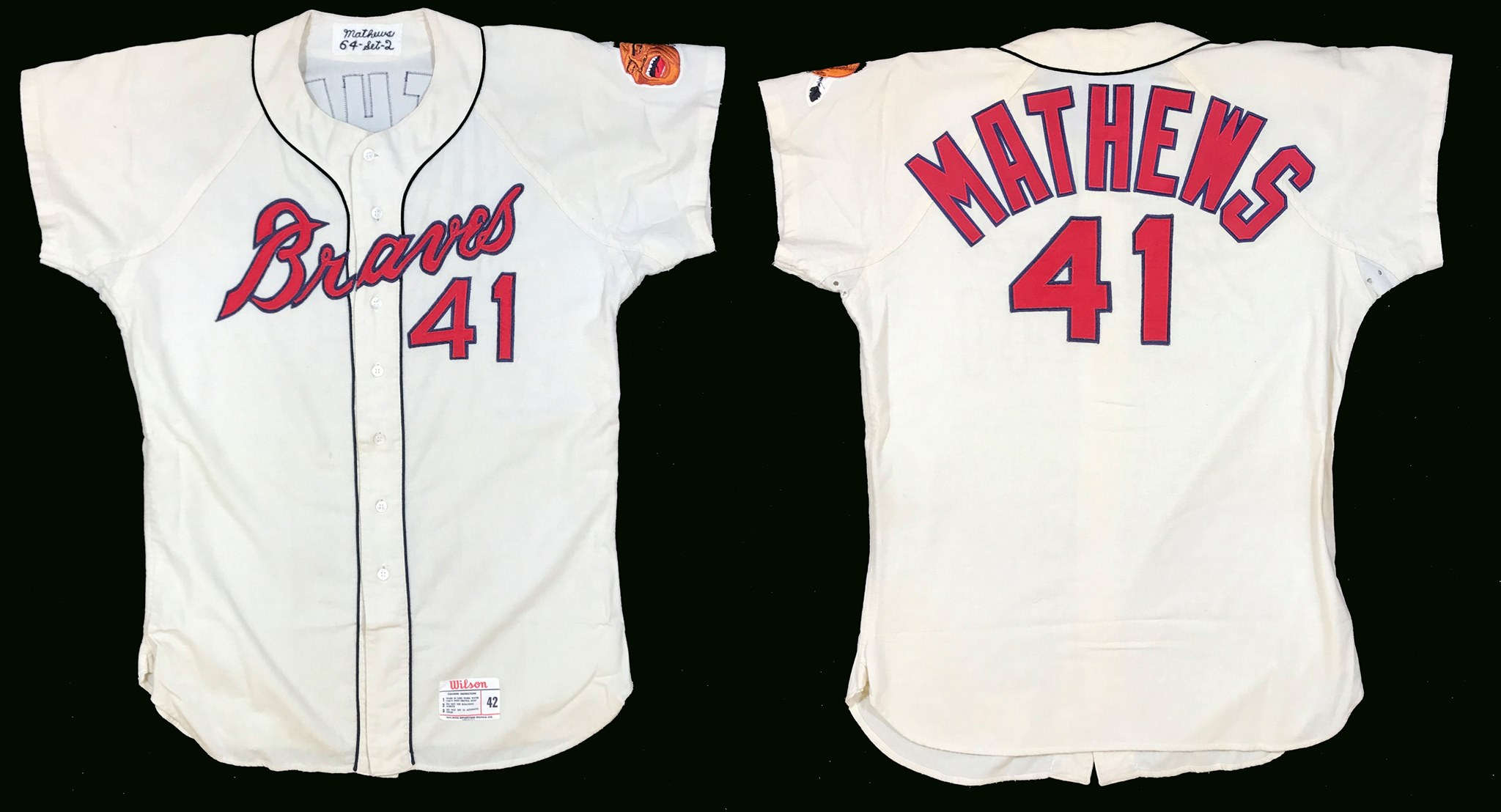
1964 Milwaukee Braves Eddie Mathews uniform.

When the team moved to Milwaukee, their uniforms were largely unchanged. The home uniforms were plain white with thin piping going around the collar and down the middle of shirt. Red script "Braves" was across the chest with navy trim. At various times, there was piping around each sleeve. Piping on the uniform could be red or navy depending on the year. Road uniforms were the same format, but on a gray shirt.

== Notable Milwaukee Braves ==
- Hank Aaron, a right fielder on the team from 1954 until the team's departure to Atlanta after 1965. He is considered the team's most accomplished player. He was inducted into the Hall of Fame in his first year of eligibility in 1982.
- Joe Adcock, a first baseman on the team from 1953 to 1962.
- Frank Bolling, a second baseman on the team from 1961 to after the team's 1966 departure to Atlanta.
- Bill Bruton, a center fielder on the team from 1953 to 1960.
- Bob Buhl, a pitcher on the team from 1953 to 1962.
- Lew Burdette, a pitcher on the team from 1953 to 1963.
- Gene Conley, a pitcher on the team from 1954 to 1958.
- Wes Covington, a left fielder on the team from 1956 to 1961.
- Del Crandall, a catcher on the team from before the team's 1953 arrival to Milwaukee to 1963.
- Johnny Logan, a shortstop on the team from before the team's 1953 arrival to Milwaukee to 1961
- Félix Mantilla, a second baseman on the team from 1956 to 1961.
- Eddie Mathews, a third baseman on the team from before the team's 1953 arrival to Milwaukee to after the team's 1966 departure to Atlanta, and is the only such player to have played on the Braves three home cities. He was inducted into the Hall of Fame in 1978.
- Andy Pafko, a right fielder on the team from 1953 to 1959.
- Red Schoendienst, a second baseman on the team from 1957 to 1960. He was inducted into the Hall of Fame in 1989.
- Warren Spahn, a pitcher on the team from before the team's 1953 arrival to 1964. He was inducted into the Hall of Fame in his first year of eligibility in 1973. The Warren Spahn Award, given annually to the major leagues' best left-handed pitcher, is named in his honor.
- Bobby Thomson, a left fielder on the team from 1954 to 1957.
- Frank Torre, a first baseman on the team from 1956 to 1960.
- Joe Torre, a catcher on the team from 1960 to after the team's 1966 departure to Atlanta. He was inducted into the Hall of Fame in 2014.
- Bob Uecker, a catcher on the team from 1962 to 1963. He was awarded the Ford C. Frick Award in 2003 by the National Baseball Hall of Fame.

== Achievements ==
=== Retired numbers ===
The Braves have retired four numbers in the history of the franchise related to its tenure in Milwaukee. Of the four Milwaukee Braves whose numbers have been retired, all who are eligible for the National Baseball Hall of Fame have been elected. The color and design of the retired numbers on commemorative markers and other in-stadium signage reflect the primary uniform design at the time the player was on the team.

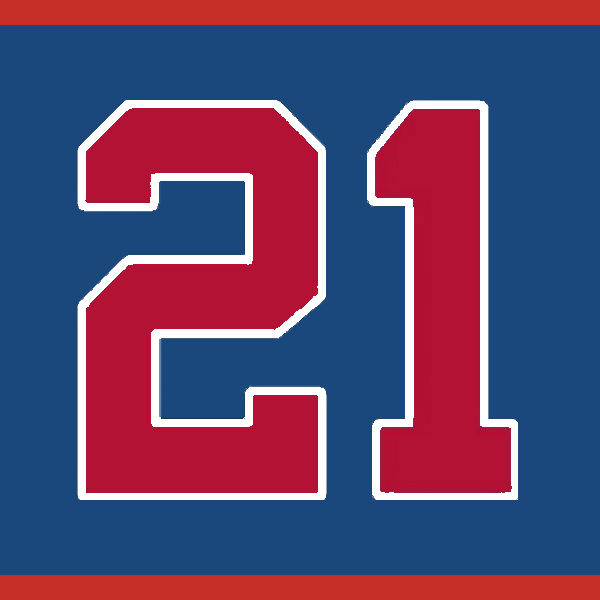
Warren
Spahn
P
Retired December 11, 1965
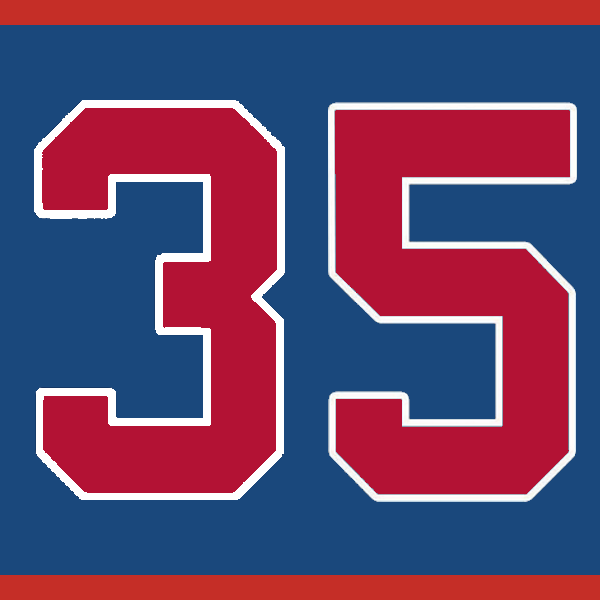
Phil
Niekro
P
Retired August 6, 1984
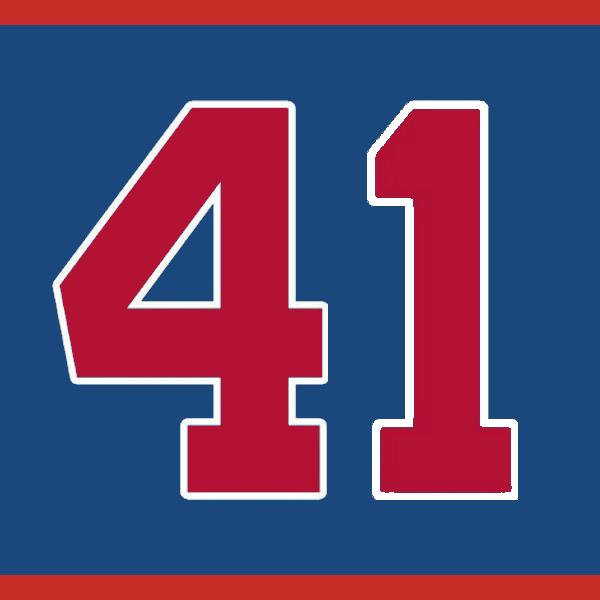
Eddie
Mathews
3B
Retired July 26, 1969
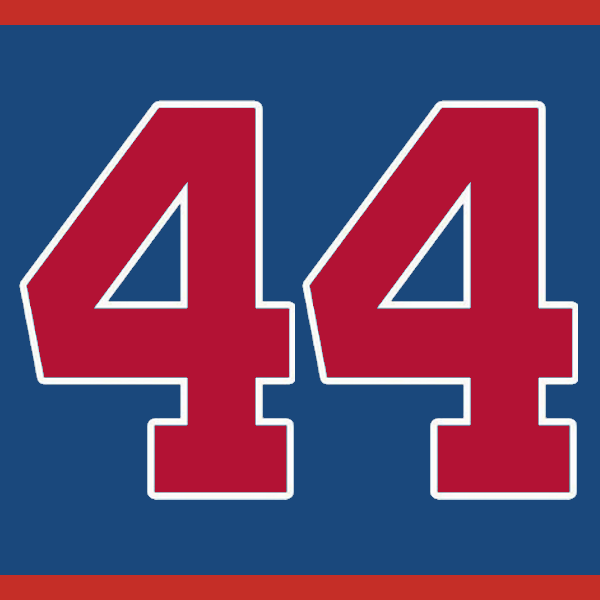
Hank
Aaron
RF
Retired April 15, 1977

=== Baseball Hall of Famers ===
Milwaukee Braves Hall of Famers
Affiliation according to the National Baseball Hall of Fame and Museum
Milwaukee Braves

**Hank Aaron** *†

**Eddie Mathews** *

Red Schoendienst

Enos Slaughter

**Warren Spahn** *

- Players and managers listed in **bold** are depicted on their Hall of Fame plaques wearing a Braves cap insignia.
- * Milwaukee Braves listed as primary team according to the Hall of Fame
- † Hank Aaron chose to represent the Atlanta Braves on his HOF cap insignia, but the HOF lists the Milwaukee Braves as his primary team

=== Milwaukee Braves Hall of Fame ===
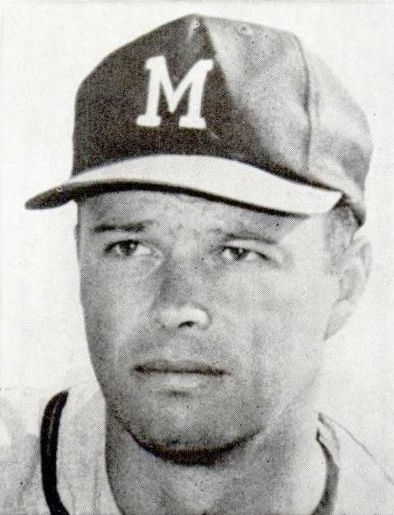
3B Eddie Mathews, Hall of Famer

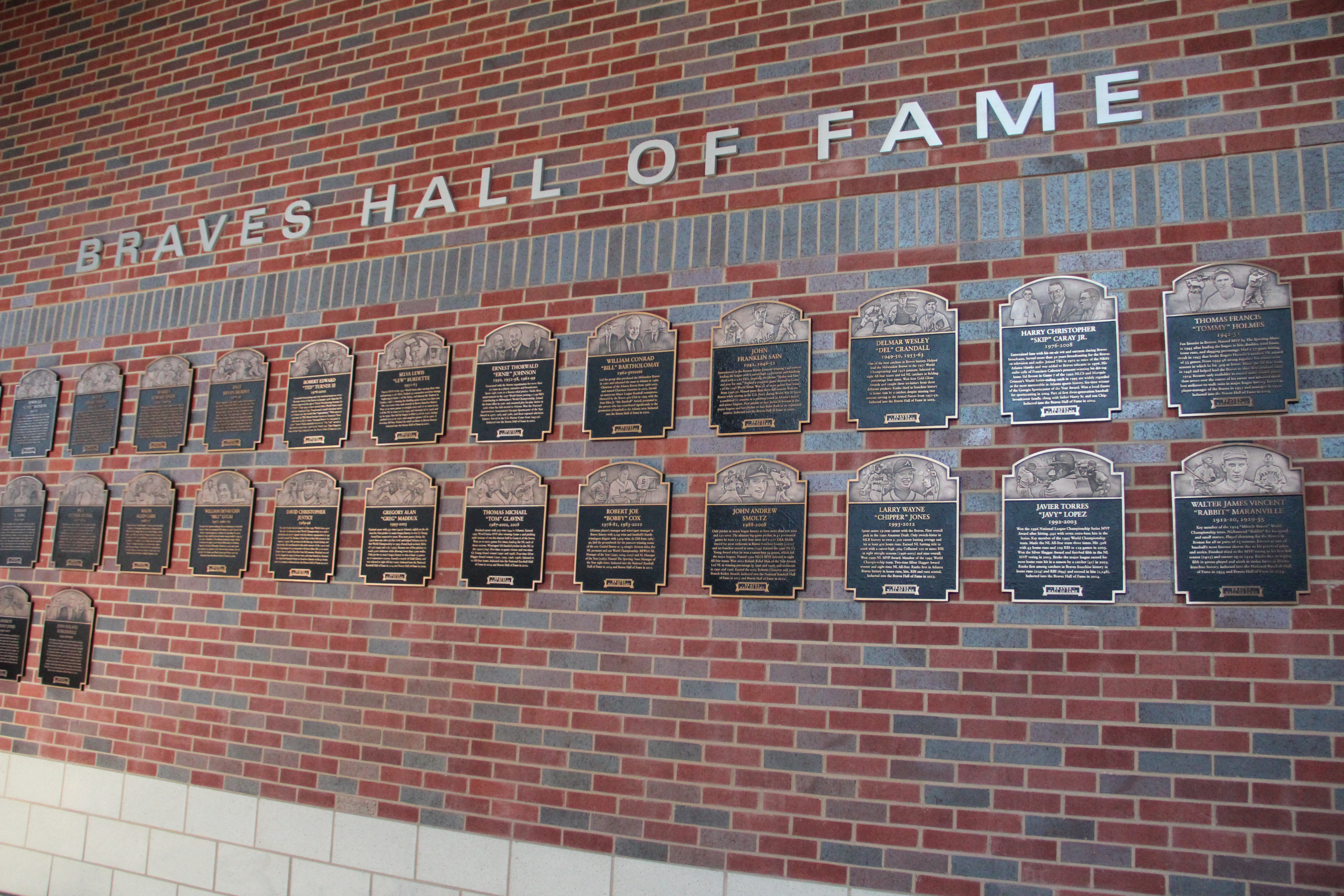
Braves Hall of Fame wall at Truist Park in Atlanta

Key
Year	Year inducted
**Bold**	Member of the Baseball Hall of Fame
†	Member of the Baseball Hall of Fame as a Milwaukee Brave

**Braves Hall of Fame**
Year	No.	Name	Position(s)	Tenure
1999	21	**Warren Spahn**^{†}	P	1953–1964
1999	35	**Phil Niekro**	P	1964–1983, 1987
1999	41	**Eddie Mathews**^{†}	3B	1953–1965
1999	44	**Hank Aaron**^{†}	RF	1954–1965
2001	32	Ernie Johnson Sr.	P Broadcaster	1950, 1952–1958; 1962–1965
2002	—	Bill Bartholomay	Owner/President	1962–1965
2003	1, 23	Del Crandall	C	1953–1963
2014	—	Dave Pursley	Trainer	1961–1965
2022	9	Joe Adcock	1B/OF	1953–1962
2022	9, 15	**Joe Torre**	C/1B/3B; Manager	1960–1965
2023	25, 43, 77	Rico Carty	LF	1963–1965

== Season-by-season records ==
Milwaukee Braves season-by-season record
Season	Wins	Losses	Win %	Place	Playoffs
1953	92	62	.597	2nd in NL	—
1954	89	65	.578	3rd in NL	—
1955	85	69	.552	2nd in NL	—
1956	92	62	.597	2nd in NL	—
1957	95	59	.617	1st in NL	Won World Series vs. New York Yankees, 4–3
1958	92	62	.597	1st in NL	Lost World Series vs. New York Yankees, 4–3
1959	86	70	.551	2nd in NL	—
1960	88	66	.571	2nd in NL	—
1961	83	71	.539	4th in NL	—
1962	86	76	.531	5th in NL	—
1963	84	78	.519	6th in NL	—
1964	88	74	.543	5th in NL	—
1965	86	76	.531	5th in NL	—
All-Time Record	1,146	890	.563	—	—

== See also ==
- History of the Atlanta Braves
