= 1955 World Series =

1955 Major League Baseball championship series

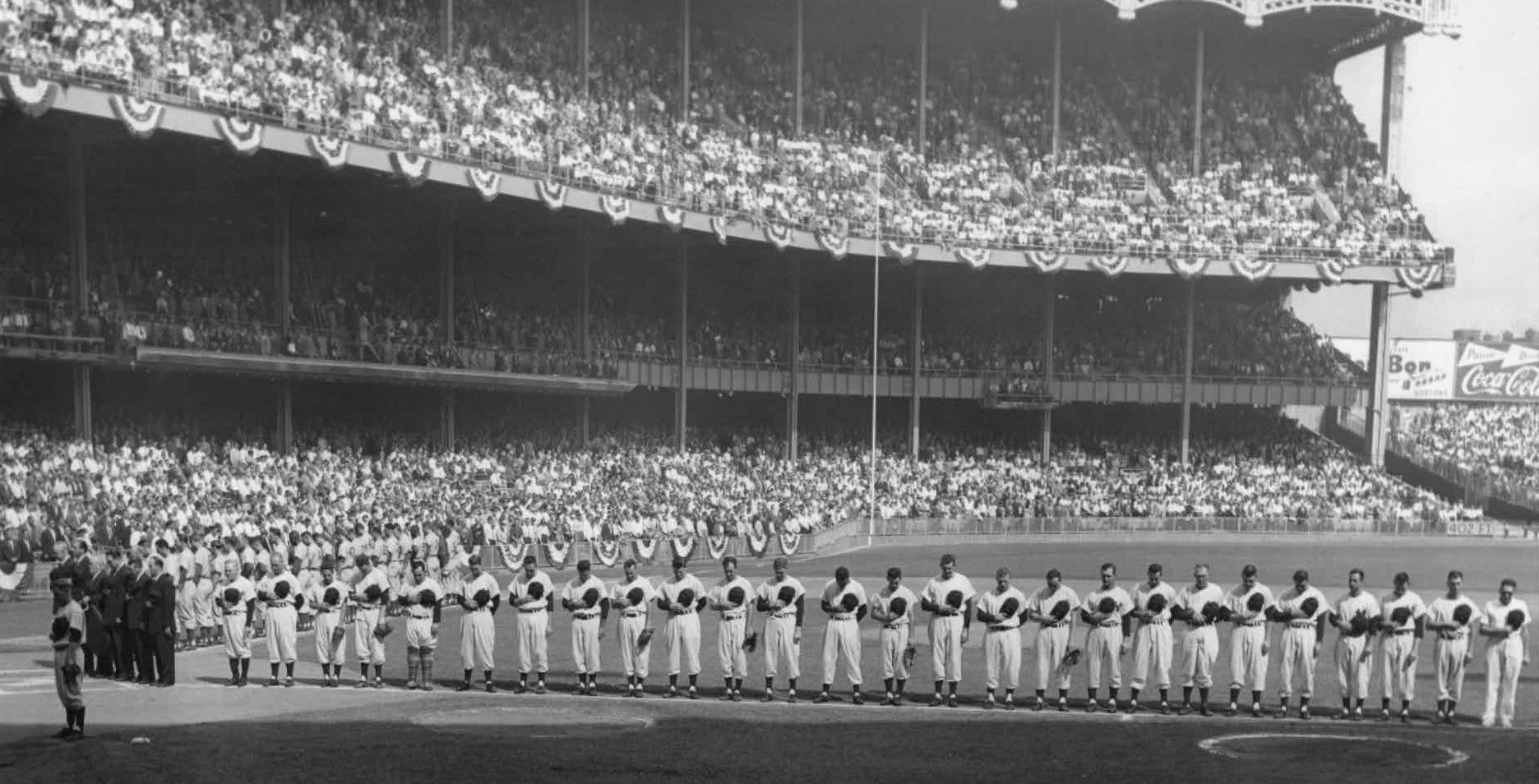
Team (Wins)	Managers	Season
Brooklyn Dodgers (4)	Walter Alston	98–55, .641, GA: 13 1/2
New York Yankees (3)	Casey Stengel	96–58, .623, GA: 3
- Dates: September 28–October 4
- Venue(s): Yankee Stadium (New York); Ebbets Field (Brooklyn)
- MVP: Johnny Podres (Brooklyn)
- Umpires: Bill Summers (AL), Lee Ballanfant (NL), Jim Honochick (AL), Frank Dascoli (NL), Red Flaherty (AL: outfield only), Augie Donatelli (NL: outfield only)
- Hall of Famers: Dodgers: Walt Alston (manager); Roy Campanella; Gil Hodges; Sandy Koufax (DNP); Pee Wee Reese; Jackie Robinson; Duke Snider; Yankees: Casey Stengel (manager); Yogi Berra; Whitey Ford; Mickey Mantle; Phil Rizzuto

Broadcast
- Television: NBC; This was the first World Series televised in color.
- TV announcers: Mel Allen and Vin Scully
- Radio: Mutual
- Radio announcers: Bob Neal and Al Helfer

The 1955 World Series was the championship series of Major League Baseball's (MLB) 1955 season. The 52nd edition of the World Series, it was a best-of-seven playoff that matched the National League (NL) champion Brooklyn Dodgers against the American League (AL) champion New York Yankees, with the Dodgers winning the Series in seven games to capture their first championship in franchise history. It would be the only Series the Dodgers won while based in Brooklyn, as the team relocated to Los Angeles after the 1957 season. This was the fifth time in nine years that the Yankees and the Dodgers met in the World Series, with the Yankees having won in 1947, 1949, 1952, and 1953; the Yankees would also win in the 1956 rematch.

This Series also marked the end of a long period of invulnerability for the Yankees in the World Series. It was the Yankees' first loss in a World Series since 1942 and only their second since 1926. The Yankees were 15–2 in Series appearances prior to the start of the 1956 season. The 1955 run would start a new run of Series appearances for New York that saw them reach the Series eight more times in the span of ten seasons, where they lost four times (1957, 1960, 1963, and 1964). Since 1955, the Yankees have been 11-10 in the fall classic.

As of 2026, 1955 remains the only year in which the Stanley Cup Final, NBA Finals, and World Series all went the full seven games.

== Background ==
This was the sixth World Series contested between the Yankees and Dodgers; the Yankees had won each of the five prior matchups (1941, 1947, 1949, 1952, and 1953); each team had changed their manager several times (New York twice and Brooklyn thrice). New York manager Casey Stengel had played for the Dodgers from 1912 through 1917.

=== Brooklyn Dodgers ===
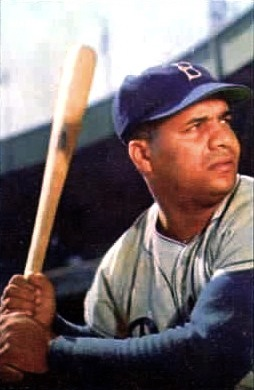
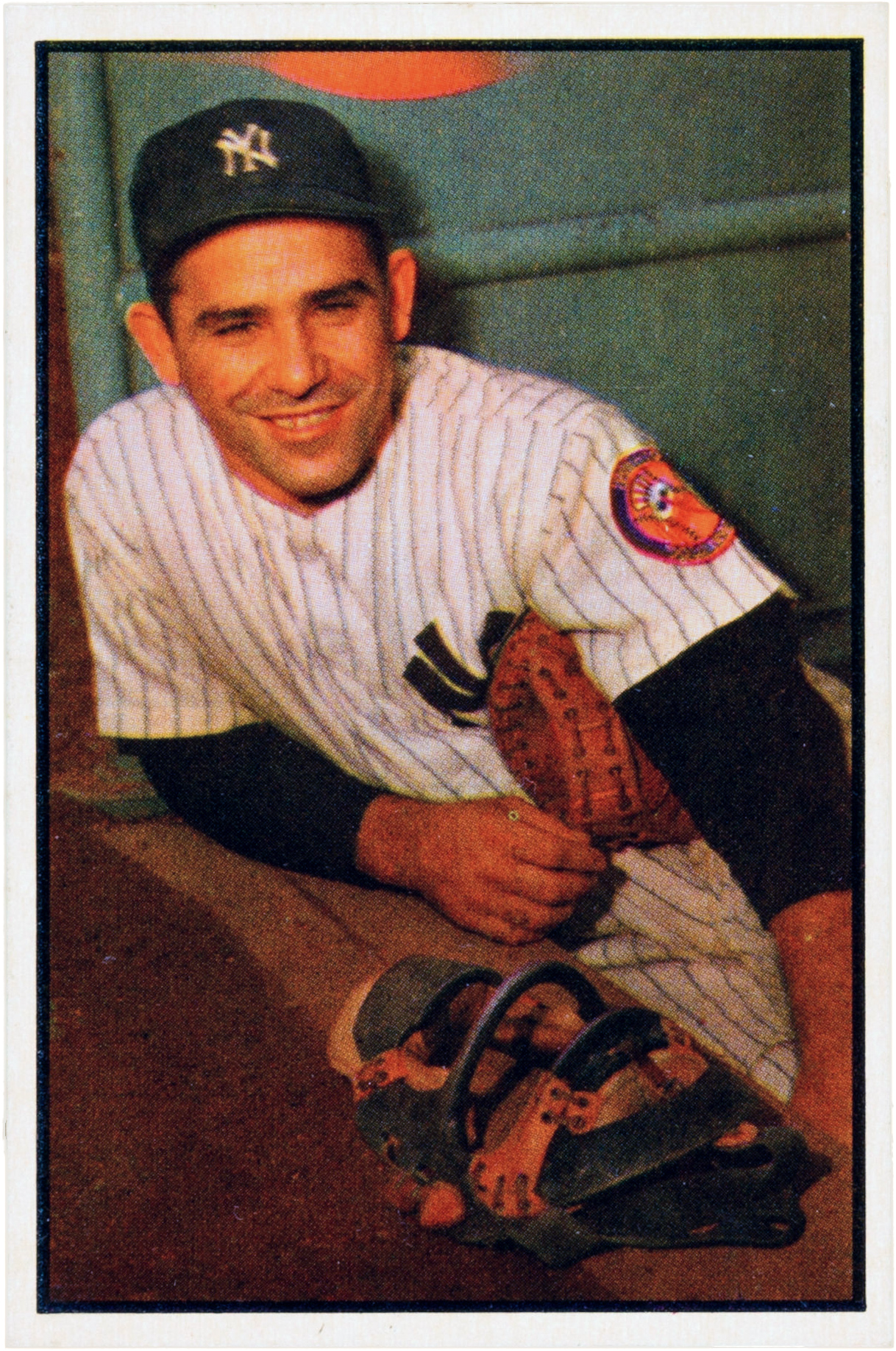
Catchers Roy Campanella (at left) and Yogi Berra were the 1955 MVPs for the National League and American League, respectively.

The NL champion Dodgers, as managed by second-year skipper Walter Alston, finished the regular season with a record of 98–55, 13 1/2 games ahead of the Milwaukee Braves. Offensive team leaders were Duke Snider (.309 batting average, 42 home runs, 136 RBIs, .628 slugging percentage, and 1.046 OPS) and Roy Campanella (.318 batting average, 32 home runs, 107 RBIs, .583 slugging percentage, and .978 OPS). Pitcher Don Newcombe led the team in wins, with a 20–5 record, and 233 2/3 innings pitched. Campanella was voted the National League MVP, narrowly edging Snider.

=== New York Yankees ===
The AL champion Yankees finished the regular season with a record of 96–58, three games ahead of the Cleveland Indians. Offensive team leaders were Mickey Mantle (.306 batting average, 37 home runs, 99 RBIs, .611 slugging percentage, and 1.042 OPS), Yogi Berra (.272 batting average, 27 home runs, 108 RBIs, .470 slugging percentage, and .819 OPS), and Bill Skowron (.319 batting average). Pitcher Whitey Ford led the team in wins, with an 18–7 record, and 253 2/3 innings pitched. Berra was voted the American League MVP, while Mantle finished fifth.

== Summary ==
NL Brooklyn Dodgers (4) vs. AL New York Yankees (3)

Game	Date	Score	Location	Time	Attendance
1	September 28	Brooklyn Dodgers – 5, New York Yankees – 6	Yankee Stadium	2:31	63,869
2	September 29	Brooklyn Dodgers – 2, New York Yankees – 4	Yankee Stadium	2:28	64,707
3	September 30	New York Yankees – 3, Brooklyn Dodgers – 8	Ebbets Field	2:20	34,209
4	October 1	New York Yankees – 5, Brooklyn Dodgers – 8	Ebbets Field	2:57	36,242
5	October 2	New York Yankees – 3, Brooklyn Dodgers – 5	Ebbets Field	2:40	36,796
6	October 3	Brooklyn Dodgers – 1, New York Yankees – 5	Yankee Stadium	2:34	64,022
7	October 4	Brooklyn Dodgers – 2, New York Yankees – 0	Yankee Stadium	2:44	62,465

== Matchups ==
=== Game 1 ===
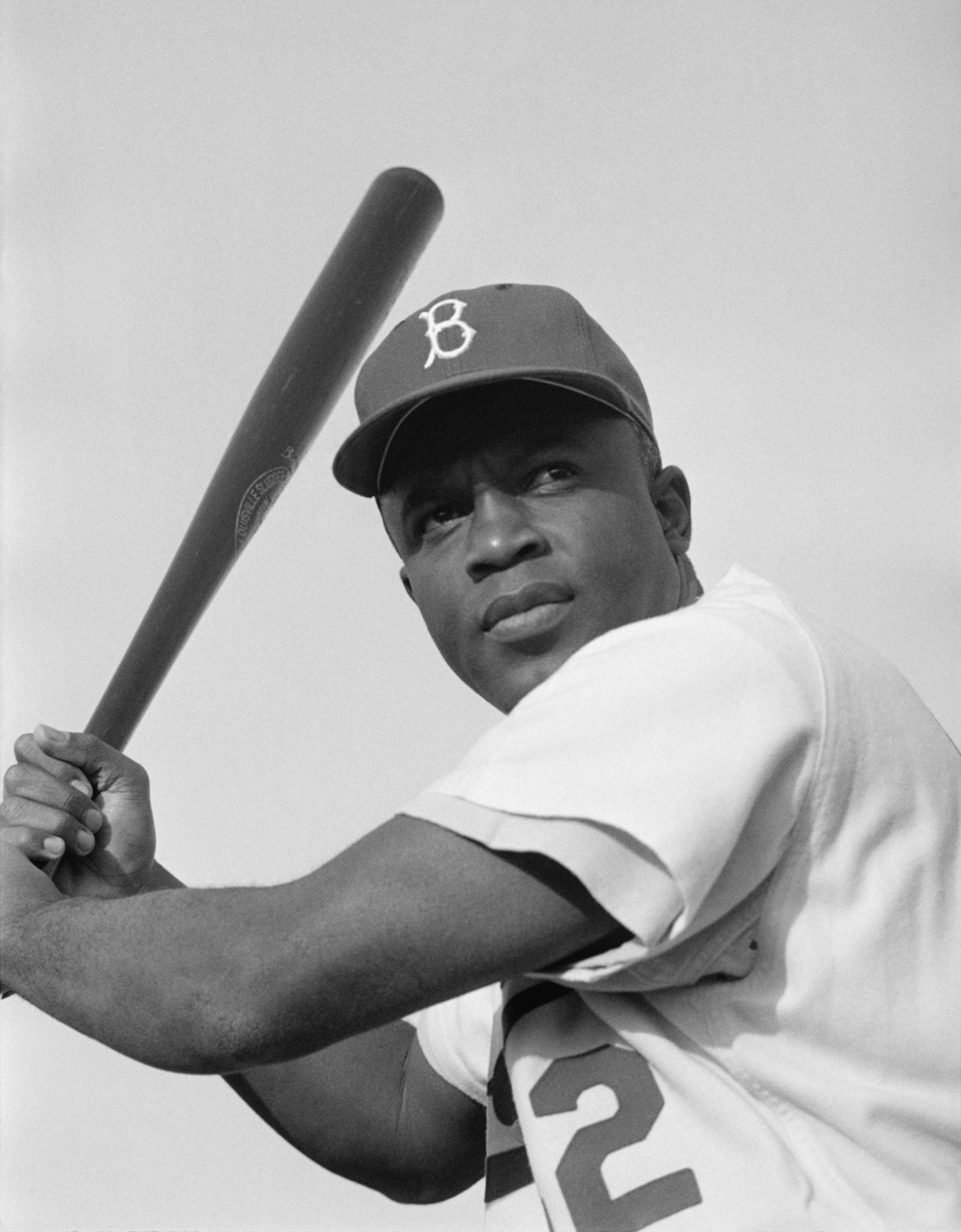
Jackie Robinson

September 28, 1955 1:00 pm (ET) at Yankee Stadium in Bronx, New York
Team	1	2	3	4	5	6	7	8	9	R	H	E
Brooklyn	0	2	1	0	0	0	0	2	0	5	10	0
New York	0	2	1	1	0	2	0	0	X	6	9	1
WP: Whitey Ford (1–0) LP: Don Newcombe (0–1) Sv: Bob Grim (1); Home runs: BRO: Carl Furillo (1), Duke Snider (1); NYY: Elston Howard (1), Joe Collins 2 (2)

In Game 1, Carl Furillo's leadoff home run in the second off Whitey Ford put the Dodgers up 1–0. Jackie Robinson then tripled with one out and scored on Don Zimmer's single, but in the bottom of the inning, after a walk, rookie Elston Howard, in his first World Series at bat, homered to tie the game off Don Newcombe. Duke Snider's leadoff home run next inning put the Dodgers back in front 3–2 (which would eventually help establish a new HR record for a seven-game series at 17), but in the bottom half, the Yankees again tied the score on Irv Noren's RBI groundout with runners on second and third. Joe Collins's leadoff home run next inning put the Yankees ahead 4–3. His two-run home run in the sixth extended their lead to 6–3. In the eighth, after a single and error by third baseman Gil McDougald put runners on second and third with one out, Zimmer's sacrifice fly scored a run, then Robinson stole home to cut the Yankees' lead to 6–5, but Ford pitched eight innings for the win while Bob Grim earned the save with a scoreless ninth to give the Yankees a 1–0 series lead.

==== Robinson's steal of home ====
Jackie Robinson's successful steal of home plate in the 8th inning became a subject of debate between baseball fans that still lingers today. For years, both Yogi Berra and Whitey Ford argued that Robinson was easily out, with Ford pointing out that he knew Robinson was far off of third base, and deliberately did a longer wind-up, instead of pitching from the stretch as pitchers normally do with runners on base, to entice Robinson into trying to steal home plate. Berra claimed that he was able to catch the ball and placed his glove in position for Robinson to slide into the tag. The official World Series newsreel footage was inconclusive, as well as all widely printed photographs. A lesser-known film taken of the play, filmed from the third-base side, showed that Robinson's foot touched the third-base side of home plate, while Berra's glove, with the ball, was briefly on the first-base side before applying the tag, though many baseball fans, particularly Yankee fans, still argue otherwise.

=== Game 2 ===
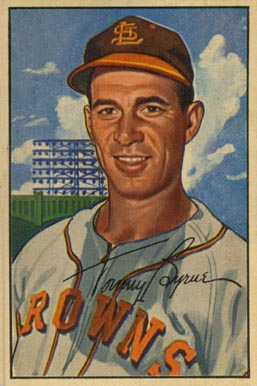
Tommy Byrne

September 29, 1955 1:00 pm (ET) at Yankee Stadium in Bronx, New York
Team	1	2	3	4	5	6	7	8	9	R	H	E
Brooklyn	0	0	0	1	1	0	0	0	0	2	5	2
New York	0	0	0	4	0	0	0	0	X	4	8	0
WP: Tommy Byrne (1–0) LP: Billy Loes (0–1)

In Game 2, Pee Wee Reese lead off the top of the fourth with a double and scored on Duke Snider's single off Tommy Byrne, but in the bottom of the inning, after a two-out single and walk, back-to-back RBI singles by Elston Howard and Billy Martin put the Yankees ahead. After a hit-by-pitch loaded the bases, Byrne's two-run single put the Yankees up 4–1 and knocked starter Billy Loes out of the game. The Dodgers got a run in the fifth on Jim Gilliam's RBI single with Jackie Robinson at third, but could not score again off Byrne, who pitched a complete game to give the Yankees a 2–0 series lead heading to Brooklyn.

=== Game 3 ===
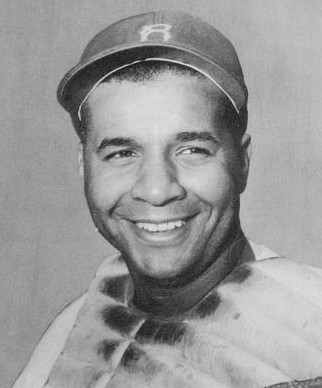
Roy Campanella

September 30, 1955 1:00 pm (ET) at Ebbets Field in Brooklyn, New York
Team	1	2	3	4	5	6	7	8	9	R	H	E
New York	0	2	0	0	0	0	1	0	0	3	7	0
Brooklyn	2	2	0	2	0	0	2	0	X	8	11	1
WP: Johnny Podres (1–0) LP: Bob Turley (0–1); Home runs: NYY: Mickey Mantle (1); BRO: Roy Campanella (1)

In Game 3, Roy Campanella's two-run home run after a walk off Bob Turley in the first put the Dodgers up 2–0, but in the second, Mickey Mantle, who only played in 3 games in this series, hit his only home run of the series. Bill Skowron then doubled and scored on Phil Rizzuto's two-out single to tie the game. In the bottom of the inning, two singles and a hit-by-pitch loaded the bases before walks to Jim Gilliam off Turley and Pee Wee Reese off Tom Morgan put the Dodgers up 4–2. In the fourth with two on, Campanella's RBI single and Carl Furillo's sacrifice fly extended the Dodgers' lead to 6–2. In the top of the seventh, Rizzuto walked with two outs and scored on Andy Carey's triple, but in the bottom half, Jackie Robinson doubled with one out off Tom Sturdivant and scored on Sandy Amoros's single. After a forceout and walk, Reese's RBI single extended the Dodgers' lead to 8–3. Johnny Podres pitched a complete game as the Dodgers cut the Yankees' series lead to 2–1. This remains the last World Series game to be played in the month of September.

=== Game 4 ===
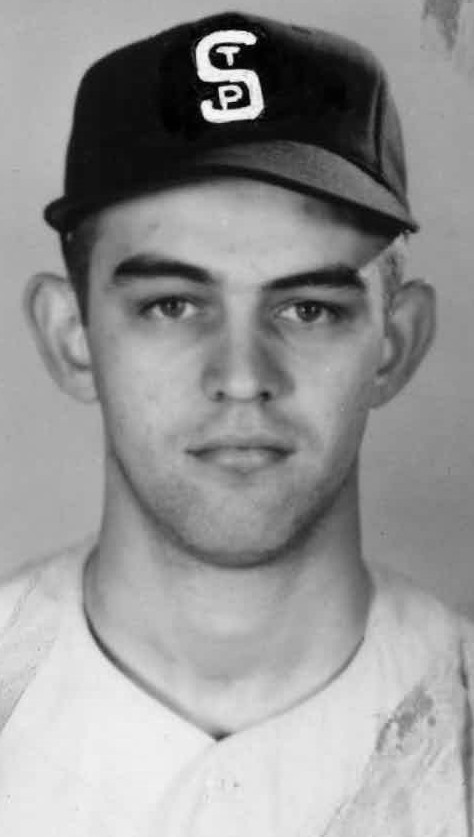
Clem Labine

October 1, 1955 1:00 pm (ET) at Ebbets Field in Brooklyn, New York
Team	1	2	3	4	5	6	7	8	9	R	H	E
New York	1	1	0	1	0	2	0	0	0	5	9	0
Brooklyn	0	0	1	3	3	0	1	0	X	8	14	0
WP: Clem Labine (1–0) LP: Don Larsen (0–1); Home runs: NYY: Gil McDougald (1); BRO: Roy Campanella (2), Gil Hodges (1), Duke Snider (2)

Gil McDougald's one-out home run in the first off Carl Erskine put the Yankees up 1–0. In the second, Joe Collins drew a leadoff walk, moved two bases on two groundouts, and scored on Phil Rizzuto's single. In the third, Sandy Amoros drew a leadoff walk off Don Larsen and scored on Jim Gilliam's RBI double. In the top of the fourth, after a leadoff walk and single, Don Bessent relieved Erksine and allowed an RBI single to Billy Martin, but in the bottom of the inning, Roy Campanella hit a leadoff home run and after a single, Gil Hodges's two-run home run put the Dodgers up 4–3. Duke Snider's three-run home run next inning off Johnny Kucks extended their lead to 7–3. In the top of the sixth, Elston Howard hit a leadoff single off Clem Labine and scored on Billy Martin's double. One out later, Eddie Robinson's RBI single cut the Dodgers' lead to 7–5, but the Dodgers added a run in the seventh on three consecutive leadoff singles by Campanella, Carl Furillo and Gil Hodges off Rip Coleman. Labine earned the win with 4 1/3 innings to close as the Dodgers tied the series with an 8–5 win.

=== Game 5 ===
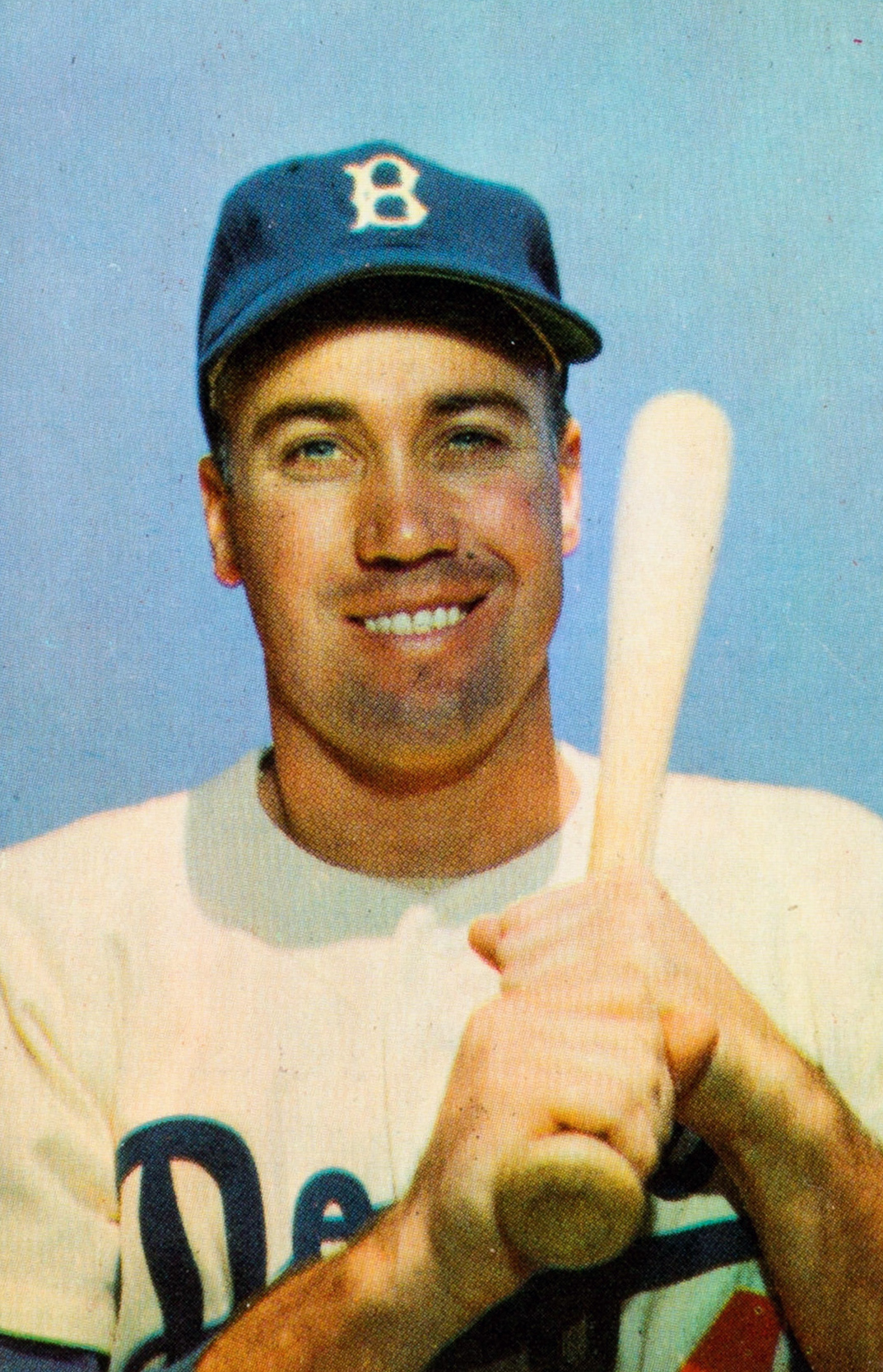
Duke Snider

October 2, 1955 2:00 pm (ET) at Ebbets Field in Brooklyn, New York
Team	1	2	3	4	5	6	7	8	9	R	H	E
New York	0	0	0	1	0	0	1	1	0	3	6	0
Brooklyn	0	2	1	0	1	0	0	1	X	5	9	2
WP: Roger Craig (1–0) LP: Bob Grim (0–1) Sv: Clem Labine (1); Home runs: NYY: Bob Cerv (1), Yogi Berra (1); BRO: Sandy Amorós (1), Duke Snider 2 (4)

In Game 5, Sandy Amoros's two-run homer in the second off Bob Grim put the Dodgers up 2–0. Next inning, Duke Snider's lead off home run made it 3–0. The Yankees got on the board in the fourth on Billy Martin's RBI single with two off rookie Roger Craig, but Snider's second home run of the game in the fifth gave the Dodgers that run back. Home runs by Bob Cerv in the seventh off Craig and Yogi Berra in the eighth off Clem Labine cut the Dodgers' lead to 4–3, but Brooklyn added an insurance run in the bottom of the eighth off Bob Turley when Carl Furillo hit a leadoff single, moved to second on a sacrifice bunt, and scored on Jackie Robinson's single. Labine pitched 2 2/3 innings in relief for Craig, who won his first World series start, for the save as the Dodgers were one win away from the championship. Snider became the only player from either league with four home runs in two different Series.

=== Game 6 ===
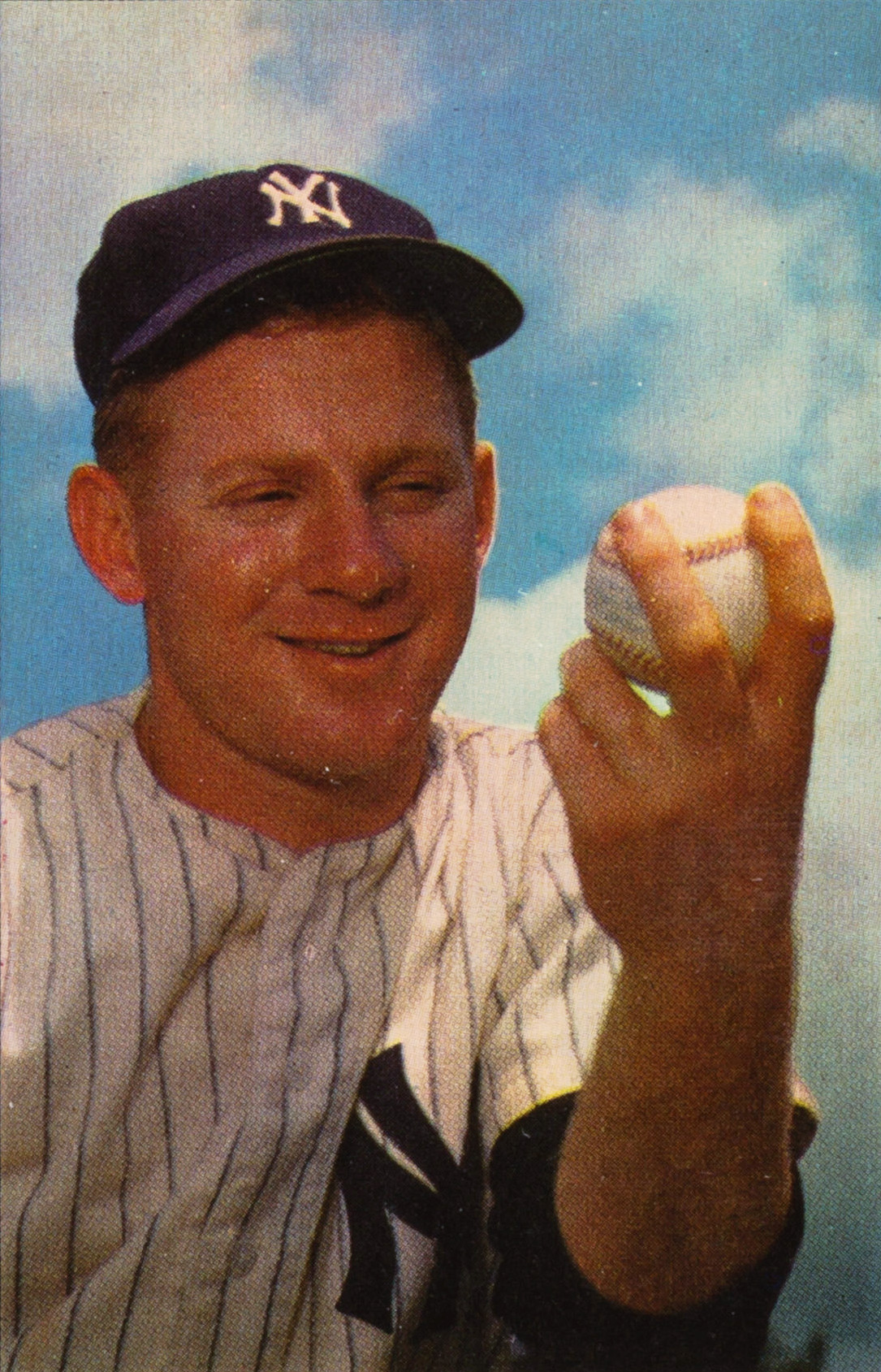
Whitey Ford

October 3, 1955 1:00 pm (ET) at Yankee Stadium in Bronx, New York
Team	1	2	3	4	5	6	7	8	9	R	H	E
Brooklyn	0	0	0	1	0	0	0	0	0	1	4	1
New York	5	0	0	0	0	0	0	0	X	5	8	0
WP: Whitey Ford (2–0) LP: Karl Spooner (0–1); Home runs: BRO: None; NYY: Bill Skowron (1)

In Game 6, the Yankees scored all five of their runs in the first off Karl Spooner. After two walks, back-to-back RBI singles by Yogi Berra and Hank Bauer put them up 2–0 before Bill Skowron capped the scoring with a three-run home run. Whitey Ford pitched a complete game, allowing one run (on Carl Furillo's RBI single in the fourth) and four hits as the Yankees forced a Game 7 with a 5–1 win.

=== Game 7 ===
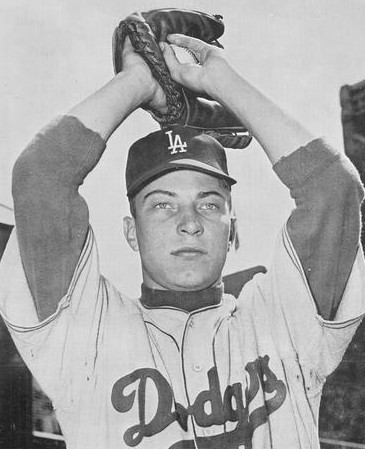
Johnny Podres

October 4, 1955 1:00 pm (ET) at Yankee Stadium in Bronx, New York
Team	1	2	3	4	5	6	7	8	9	R	H	E
Brooklyn	0	0	0	1	0	1	0	0	0	2	5	0
New York	0	0	0	0	0	0	0	0	0	0	8	1
WP: Johnny Podres (2–0) LP: Tommy Byrne (1–1)

The Dodgers scored the game's only runs on a fourth inning RBI single and sixth inning bases-loaded sacrifice fly, both by Gil Hodges. The RBIs by Hodges were set up by a double by Roy Campanella in the fourth and a lead-off single by Pee Wee Reese in the sixth — the only time a Dodgers lead-off hitter reached base in any inning. While Campanella scored on Hodges' two-out single, Reese had advanced to third on two bunts.

While being shut out by Johnny Podres, the Yankees, meanwhile, scattered eight hits over the six innings in which they were not retired in order. They only mustered one hit with runners in scoring position, though, which ironically was a base hit awarded to Gil McDougald in the third inning, when Phil Rizzuto was hit by a groundball while running the bases. Rizzuto, instead of being batted in for a 1–0 Yankees lead, was thus ruled out to end the inning. Psychologically this may have marked a turning point for the Dodgers, who had never beaten the Yankees in a World Series. Pitcher Carl Erskine saw this play as "an omen", as such unfortunate miscues had usually been "the things that happened to us".

The Yankees would have three more scoring opportunities against Podres: In the fourth inning, a lead-off double by Yogi Berra was wasted. Then, in the sixth inning, with runners on first and second and one out, left fielder Sandy Amorós made a dramatic game-saving catch of a deep fly ball down the left field line off the bat of Yogi Berra to start a double play. Amorós then threw to Pee Wee Reese and Reese relayed to Gil Hodges, who tagged Yankee Gil McDougald before McDougald could get back to first. This possibly stymied the Yankees' best chance of the day.

The Yankees would threaten Podres one last time, when McDougald could not bring a runner in from third with only one out, hitting a short flyball to rightfield, one inning before Elston Howard grounded out to Reese for the final out; the two shared the dubious record for playing in the most losing World Series (six each).

This would be the only time in Jackie Robinson's career when he did not play in his team's World Series game. Don Hoak replaced Robinson in the line-up, and played third base.

For the first time in Series history, an MVP was selected—Johnny Podres, winning pitcher of Games 3 and 7. He won and pitched complete games in both of his starts including the series-clinching Game 7 shutout, and recorded 10 strikeouts, two earned runs off 15 hits, and a 1.00 ERA in 18 total innings pitched.

== Composite box ==
1955 World Series (4–3): Brooklyn Dodgers (N.L.) over New York Yankees (A.L.)

Team	1	2	3	4	5	6	7	8	9	R	H	E
Brooklyn Dodgers	2	6	3	8	5	1	3	3	0	31	58	6
New York Yankees	6	5	1	7	0	4	2	1	0	26	55	2
Total attendance: 362,310 Average attendance: 51,759; Winning player's share: $9,768 Losing player's share: $5,599; Notes: Adjusted for inflation, winning and losing player's shares are $117,398 and $67,292 respectively, as of 2025.

== Legacy ==
=== References in popular culture ===
In her epistolary book (and later stage and film adaptations) 84 Charing Cross Road, the author Helene Hanff reveals herself to be a Brooklyn Dodgers fan and asks her correspondent Frank Doel (along with family) to pray for the Dodgers' fortunes in the series: (sic.) "I shall be obliged if you will send Nora and the girls to church every Sunday for the next month to pray for the continued health and strength of the messrs. Gilliam, Reese, Snider, Campanella, Robinson, Hodges, Furillo, Podres, Newcombe and Labine, collectively known as The Brooklyn Dodgers. If they lose this World Series I shall Do Myself In and then where will you be?"

Singer Billy Joel referenced the Dodgers' victory in his single "We Didn't Start the Fire" with the line "Brooklyn's got a winning team".

=== 50th Anniversary ===
Commemorating the 50th anniversary of the franchise winning its first World Series (and only one while in Brooklyn), the Los Angeles Dodgers held a "weekend celebration in August [of 2005 ...] for the 11 surviving members of the 1955" team.

The weekend before the anniversary, an autograph session was held in Bensonhurst, Brooklyn, featuring Game 7 hero Johnny Podres and, interestingly, two Dodgers who were not on the 1955 team — Ralph Branca, who had left the club in 1953 before returning in 1956, and Joe Pignatano, who joined the Dodgers in 1957. He won the World Series in 1959.

No official commemorative event, however, took place in Brooklyn on October 4, 2005 (the actual anniversary of the Dodgers' triumph), prompting author Thomas Oliphant to argue that "on both coasts, we could have done a little bit better, especially for such an important memory".

That being said, a small gathering of ten people took place at the site of Ebbets Field on October 4, 2005 "at 3:43 pm, 50 years to the minute from when the Brooklyn Dodgers won their only World Series." Brooklyn Paper journalist Ed Shakespeare reported that "[a]ll of the attendees came alone or in pairs, unaware of who else might attend", describing the event as "a sharing of memories from those who remembered".

== Aftermath ==
For the Yankees, who appeared in and won five consecutive World Series titles from 1949 to 1953, this was the first loss for a Casey Stengel-led team. Like this fall classic, Stengel's final four trips as manager went the maximum seven games - they won a rematch against the Dodgers the following year, then made three more trips to the World Series during Stengel's tenure - winning in 1958 against the Milwaukee Braves in seven games after trailing 3–1 in the series, and losing in 1957 against the aforementioned Braves, also in seven games. They also returned in 1960, but lost to the Pittsburgh Pirates on a walk-off home run in Game 7 after being six outs away from the championship.

For the Dodgers, this was the peak of their success while based in Brooklyn. Three years later, they left Ebbets Field and moved to Los Angeles. A year after moving to Los Angeles, the Dodgers returned to the World Series and defeated the Chicago White Sox in six games for their second championship. Then, they would play in 13 more World Series, winning eight more titles, most recently in 2025.

Dodgers pitcher Johnny Podres was the recipient of the very first World Series Most Valuable Player Award.

As of 2025, Sandy Koufax, although he did not play in the 1955 World Series, is the last living player from the 1955 Dodgers.

== See also ==
- 1955 Japan Series
- 1955 Global World Series
- Subway Series / Dodgers–Yankees rivalry
