= 1957 Major League Baseball All-Star Game =

1957 American baseball competition

| | 1 | 2 | 3 | 4 | 5 | 6 | 7 | 8 | 9 | R | H | E |
|---|---|---|---|---|---|---|---|---|---|---|---|---|
| American League | 0 | 2 | 0 | 0 | 0 | 1 | 0 | 0 | 3 | 6 | 10 | 0 |
| National League | 0 | 0 | 0 | 0 | 0 | 0 | 2 | 0 | 3 | 5 | 9 | 1 |
- Date: July 9, 1957
- Venue: Busch Stadium
- City: St. Louis, Missouri
- Managers: Casey Stengel (NYY); Walter Alston (BKN)
- Attendance: 30,693
- Ceremonial first pitch: None
- Television: NBC
- TV announcers: Mel Allen and Al Helfer
- Radio: NBC
- Radio announcers: Bob Neal and Harry Caray

The 1957 Major League Baseball All-Star Game was the 24th playing of the midseason exhibition baseball game between the all-stars of the American League (AL) and National League (NL), the two leagues comprising Major League Baseball. The game was held on July 9, 1957, at Busch Stadium in St. Louis, Missouri, the home of the St. Louis Cardinals of the National League. The game was marked by controversy surrounding Cincinnati Redlegs fans stuffing the ballot box and electing all but one of their starting position players to the game. The game resulted in the American League defeating the National League 6–5.

== Game summary ==
Six runs were scored in the final inning, three by each team, for an exciting ending as the American League eked out a 6-5 victory.

The game's scoring began in the second inning with a Mickey Mantle single, Ted Williams walk and Vic Wertz base hit, followed by walks to Yogi Berra and Harvey Kuenn that put the AL on top, 2-0. The score remained that way until the sixth, when a Moose Skowron double and Berra single made it 3-0.

Scoring twice in the seventh, the NL closed the gap with a two-run double by Gus Bell, pinch-hitting for Frank Robinson. In the ninth, the AL appeared to seal the victory with a two-run double by Al Kaline and RBI double by Minnie Miñoso for a 6-2 advantage.

Stan Musial walked and Willie Mays tripled to begin the bottom of the ninth. After Ernie Banks delivered a run-scoring single, with its lead trimmed to 6-5, the AL brought in Bob Grim to face pinch-hitter Gil Hodges, who lined out to left field to end the game.

== Cincinnati voting controversy ==
When fan voting to determine the game's starters was completed, no fewer than seven Cincinnati Redlegs players (Ed Bailey, Johnny Temple, Roy McMillan, Don Hoak, Frank Robinson, Gus Bell and Wally Post) had been elected to start in the All-Star Game, a record that still stands. The only non-Redleg elected for the National League was St. Louis Cardinal first baseman Stan Musial, who had only narrowly beaten his Reds counterpart George Crowe. Although Cincinnati had the second-best offense in the majors (they would score 747 runs that year, surpassed only by Milwaukee), most baseball observers felt they obviously did not deserve seven starters in the All-Star Game.

An investigation was launched by Commissioner Ford Frick, which found that the majority of the ballots cast had come from Cincinnati; in fact, The Cincinnati Times-Star newspaper had printed up pre-marked ballots with the Cincinnati starting lineup on them, and distributed them with each day's paper to make it easy for Redlegs fans to vote often for their favorite players. Meanwhile, Burger Beer, a Redlegs sponsor, had printed 250,000 similar ballots and distributed them to local bars, and stories emerged of bartenders refusing to serve alcohol to customers until they filled out a ballot.

Subsequently, Frick suspended fans' voting rights, and appointed Willie Mays of the New York Giants and Hank Aaron of the Milwaukee Braves to substitute for Bell and Post. Bell was kept as a reserve (he would bat for Redlegs teammate Robinson in the seventh and slap a two-RBI double), while Post was injured and would have been unable to play in any event. Hoak and McMillan were each dismissed from the game after a single at-bat, in favor of future Hall of Famers Eddie Mathews and Ernie Banks, respectively. Temple batted twice before giving way to another future Cooperstown resident, Red Schoendienst. (Bailey caught the whole game, but was pinch-hit for in the bottom of the ninth.)

Managers, players, and coaches picked the teams until fan voting rights were restored in 1970. To avoid a repeat of this incident, MLB officials evenly distributed the 26 million ballots for that year to 75,000 retail outlets and 150 minor and major league stadiums, while a special panel was also created to review the voting.

Despite these (and other subsequent) measures, teams and media outlets still tell fans to vote for their favorite players instead of the best players; while the voting for the All-Star Game has remained a popularity contest, it is to a lesser extent than in 1957.

== Rosters ==
Players in italics have since been inducted into the National Baseball Hall of Fame.

=== American League ===
Starters
| Position | Player | Team | All-Star Games |
|---|---|---|---|
| P | Jim Bunning | Tigers | 1 |
| C | Yogi Berra | Yankees | 10 |
| 1B | Vic Wertz | Indians | 4 |
| 2B | Nellie Fox | White Sox | 7 |
| 3B | George Kell | Orioles | 10 |
| SS | Harvey Kuenn | Tigers | 5 |
| OF | Al Kaline | Tigers | 3 |
| OF | Mickey Mantle | Yankees | 6 |
| OF | Ted Williams | Red Sox | 14 |

Pitchers
| Position | Player | Team | All-Star Games |
|---|---|---|---|
| P | Bob Grim | Yankees | 1 |
| P | Billy Loes | Orioles | 1 |
| P | Don Mossi | Indians | 1 |
| P | Billy Pierce | White Sox | 4 |
| P | Bobby Shantz | Yankees | 3 |
| P | Early Wynn | Indians | 3 |

Reserves
| Position | Player | Team | All-Star Games |
|---|---|---|---|
| C | Elston Howard | Yankees | 1 |
| C | Gus Triandos | Orioles | 1 |
| 1B | Moose Skowron | Yankees | 1 |
| 2B | Bobby Richardson | Yankees | 1 |
| 3B | Frank Malzone | Red Sox | 1 |
| SS | Joe DeMaestri | Athletics | 1 |
| SS | Gil McDougald | Yankees | 3 |
| OF | Charlie Maxwell | Tigers | 2 |
| OF | Minnie Miñoso | White Sox | 5 |
| OF | Roy Sievers | Senators | 2 |

=== National League ===
Starters
| Position | Player | Team | All-Star Games |
|---|---|---|---|
| P | Curt Simmons | Phillies | 3 |
| C | Ed Bailey | Redlegs | 2 |
| 1B | Stan Musial | Cardinals | 14 |
| 2B | Johnny Temple | Redlegs | 2 |
| 3B | Don Hoak | Redlegs | 1 |
| SS | Roy McMillan | Redlegs | 2 |
| OF | Hank Aaron | Braves | 3 |
| OF | Willie Mays | Giants | 4 |
| OF | Frank Robinson | Redlegs | 2 |

Pitchers
| Position | Player | Team | All-Star Games |
|---|---|---|---|
| P | Johnny Antonelli | Giants | 3 |
| P | Lew Burdette | Braves | 1 |
| P | Larry Jackson | Cardinals | 1 |
| P | Clem Labine | Dodgers | 2 |
| P | Jack Sanford | Phillies | 1 |
| P | Warren Spahn | Braves | 9 |

Reserves
| Position | Player | Team | All-Star Games |
|---|---|---|---|
| C | Hank Foiles | Pirates | 1 |
| C | Hal Smith | Cardinals | 1 |
| 1B | Gil Hodges | Dodgers | 8 |
| 2B | Red Schoendienst | Braves | 10 |
| 3B | Eddie Mathews | Braves | 4 |
| SS | Ernie Banks | Cubs | 3 |
| SS | Johnny Logan | Braves | 2 |
| OF | Gus Bell | Redlegs | 4 |
| OF | Gino Cimoli | Dodgers | 1 |
| OF | Wally Moon | Cardinals | 1 |

== Game ==
=== Umpires ===
| Home Plate | Frank Dascoli (NL) |
| First Base | Larry Napp (AL) |
| Second Base | Hal Dixon (NL) |
| Third Base | Johnny Stevens (AL) |
| Left Field | Stan Landes (NL) |
| Right Field | Nestor Chylak (AL) |

=== Starting lineups ===
| American League | | | | National League | | | |
| Order | Player | Team | Position | Order | Player | Team | Position |
|---|---|---|---|---|---|---|---|
| 1 | Harvey Kuenn | Tigers | SS | 1 | Johnny Temple | Reds | 2B |
| 2 | Nellie Fox | White Sox | 2B | 2 | Hank Aaron | Braves | RF |
| 3 | Al Kaline | Tigers | RF | 3 | Stan Musial | Cardinals | 1B |
| 4 | Mickey Mantle | Yankees | CF | 4 | Willie Mays | Giants | CF |
| 5 | Ted Williams | Red Sox | LF | 5 | Ed Bailey | Reds | C |
| 6 | Vic Wertz | Indians | 1B | 6 | Frank Robinson | Reds | LF |
| 7 | Yogi Berra | Yankees | C | 7 | Don Hoak | Reds | 3B |
| 8 | George Kell | Orioles | 3B | 8 | Roy McMillan | Reds | SS |
| 9 | Jim Bunning | Tigers | P | 9 | Curt Simmons | Phillies | P |

=== Game summary ===
Tuesday, July 9, 1957 1:30 pm (CT) at Busch Stadium in St. Louis, Missouri
| Team | 1 | 2 | 3 | 4 | 5 | 6 | 7 | 8 | 9 | R | H | E |
|---|---|---|---|---|---|---|---|---|---|---|---|---|
| American League | 0 | 2 | 0 | 0 | 0 | 1 | 0 | 0 | 3 | 6 | 10 | 0 |
| National League | 0 | 0 | 0 | 0 | 0 | 0 | 2 | 0 | 3 | 5 | 9 | 1 |
WP: Jim Bunning (1–0) LP: Curt Simmons (0–1) Sv: Bob Grim (1)
