= Karl Spooner =

American baseball player (1931-1984)

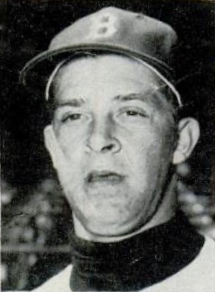
- Spooner in 1955
- Pitcher
- Born: June 23, 1931; Oriskany Falls, New York, U.S.
- Died: April 10, 1984 (aged 52); Vero Beach, Florida, U.S.
- Batted: Right Threw: Left

MLB debut
- September 22, 1954, for the Brooklyn Dodgers

Last MLB appearance
- September 17, 1955, for the Brooklyn Dodgers

MLB statistics
- Win–loss record: 10–6
- Earned run average: 3.09
- Strikeouts: 105
- Stats at Baseball Reference

Teams
- Brooklyn Dodgers (1954–1955)

Career highlights and awards
- World Series champion (1955)

Karl Benjamin Spooner (June 23, 1931 – April 10, 1984) was an American professional baseball player. He played in Major League Baseball (MLB) as a left-handed pitcher for the Brooklyn Dodgers. After a meteoric rise during which he set a Major League Baseball record for most strikeouts by a pitcher in his major league debut in 1954, his promising athletic career was ended prematurely by an injury to his pitching arm.

== Baseball career ==
=== Early years ===
Spooner was born in Oriskany Falls, New York, where he graduated from high school. The 6 ft (1.8 m), 185 lb (84 kg) southpaw was signed by the Dodgers as an amateur free agent in 1951.

Spooner's early minor-league career was promising, but erratic. He made his way through the Dodgers' minor league system, compiling a fairly unimpressive 26–34 record during his first three seasons. Walks were frequently a problem, as Spooner averaged a walk per inning in his first two minor league seasons. However, he threw hard, led two leagues in strikeouts — the Pennsylvania–Ontario–New York League (1951) and Western League (1953) — and showed flashes of brilliance.

Spooner had a breakout year in 1954 when he won 21 games with 262 strikeouts in 238 innings for the Fort Worth Cats of the Texas League. His successful performance earned him a promotion to the Dodgers with one week left in the 1954 season.

=== Record-setting debut ===
Spooner made his major league debut with the Dodgers on September 22, 1954 at the age of 23. He shut out the pennant-bound New York Giants 3–0, allowed only three hits, all singles, and struck out 15 batters, setting an MLB record for most strikeouts by a pitcher in his debut. In the process, he broke the record of 13 strikeouts set by the Giants’ Cliff Melton on April 25, 1937. J. R. Richard tied the record in his major league debut in 1971. Spooner also set another record for pitching debuts by recording six consecutive strikeouts, striking out the side in both the seventh and eighth innings. Pete Richert (1962) is the only other pitcher to strike out six consecutive batters in his big-league debut.

Four days later, Spooner beat the Pittsburgh Pirates, 1–0, striking out 12 and surrendering four hits. In his two starts for the 1954 Dodgers, Spooner threw two complete game shutouts; in 18 innings, he gave up seven total hits and no runs. His 27 strikeouts in two successive games was a National League record (not just for rookies) and was second only to Bob Feller’s 28 on the major league list.

=== Career-altering injury ===
During spring training prior to the 1955 season, Spooner entered a game without warming up properly and injured his arm. He came back on May 15, appearing in 29 games with the Dodgers that year, but with only fairly mild success. Initially used as a spot starter, he was moved to the bullpen after two poor starts. He was added back into the rotation in late June, removed from it at the end of July, and was then given some spot starts in August and September, finishing the season at 8–6 as the Dodgers won the National League pennant.

Despite his winning record, Spooner was deemed only marginally effective. Prior to the injury, Spooner threw a fastball which ranged in the mid to high 90s; post-injury, that was not the case. In his final appearance with the Dodgers, Game 6 of the 1955 World Series, he was shellacked, giving up five runs in one-third of an inning against the New York Yankees and taking the 5–1 loss. Brooklyn, however, would win the Series' decisive Game 7 for its first, and only, world championship before the franchise moved to Los Angeles in 1958.

=== Return to the minors ===
Spooner never again played in the majors after 1955. Still hampered by injuries, he pitched in only four games in Triple-A in 1956. Although he was called up to the Dodgers in September, he did not get into any games. In 1957, Spooner was demoted two more levels, to Class A; in 13 games with nine starts, he was 2–4.

The Dodgers left Spooner unprotected in the 1957 minor league draft, and he was claimed by the St. Louis Cardinals. In 1958, St. Louis sent Spooner to the lowest rung of minor league ball, playing for Dothan in the Class D Alabama–Florida League, appearing in nine games. He also played two games for Houston at the Double-A level that same season, his last in professional baseball. Spooner attended spring training in 1959, but retired before the season started.

=== MLB statistics ===
Spooner's lifetime major-league statistics line included a 10–6 won–lost record in 31 games pitched; in 1162/3 innings pitched, he allowed 86 hits, 47 bases on balls, and 40 earned runs, compiling a 3.09 ERA. He struck out 105, threw three career shutouts and four complete games in 16 starting pitcher assignments, and was credited with three saves in his 15 games as a relief pitcher. In his two 1955 World Series appearances, including his Game 6 start, Spooner posted a 0–1 record and 13.50 ERA; he allowed five earned runs on four hits (including a three-run home run to Bill Skowron) and three walks, recording six strikeouts, in 31/3 innings of work.

== Later life ==
As his baseball career wound down, Spooner moved to Vero Beach, Florida and found work as a manager in the citrus industry. He worked at this job for the rest of his life, raising five children with his wife Carol.

Karl Spooner died of liver cancer in 1984, aged 52.
