= Dodgers–Yankees rivalry =

Major League Baseball rivalry

- Los Angeles Dodgers New York Yankees
- First meeting: World Series: October 1, 1941; Yankee Stadium (I), New York, New York; Yankees 3, Dodgers 2 Regular season: June 18, 2004; Dodger Stadium, Los Angeles, California; Dodgers 6, Yankees 3
- Latest meeting: July 19, 2026; Yankee Stadium, New York, New York; Yankees 2, Dodgers 1
- Next meeting: August 27, 2027; Dodger Stadium, Los Angeles, California
- Stadiums: Historical (New York City): Dodgers: Ebbets Field; Yankees: Yankee Stadium (I); Current: Dodgers: Dodger Stadium; Yankees: Yankee Stadium (II)

Statistics
- Total meetings: 96 (World Series: 71, regular season: 25)
- All-time series: Yankees, 51–48 (.515)
- Regular season series: Dodgers, 15–13 (.536)
- Postseason results: Yankees, 38–33 (.535)
- Largest victory: Overall: Dodgers, 18–2 (May 31 2025); Yankees, 12–2 (World Series–October 15, 1978); Regular Season only: Dodgers, 18–2 (May 31, 2025); Yankees, 10–2 (August 23, 2019)
- Longest win streak: Overall: Dodgers, 5 (World Series–October 23, 1981–June 18, 2004); Yankees, 6 (October 13, 1978–October 21, 1981); Regular Season only: Dodgers, 2 (June 19 – July 30, 2013; June 7–8, 2024; May 30–31, 2025); Yankees, 2 (June 27, 2010–June 19, 2013; June 3–4, 2023)
- Current win streak: Yankees 1,

Post-season history
- 1941 World Series: Yankees defeat Dodgers, 4–1; 1947 World Series: Yankees defeat Dodgers, 4–3; 1949 World Series: Yankees defeat Dodgers, 4–1; 1952 World Series: Yankees defeat Dodgers, 4–3; 1953 World Series: Yankees defeat Dodgers, 4–2; 1955 World Series: Dodgers defeat Yankees, 4–3; 1956 World Series: Yankees defeat Dodgers, 4–3; 1963 World Series: Dodgers defeat Yankees, 4–0; 1977 World Series: Yankees defeat Dodgers, 4–2; 1978 World Series: Yankees defeat Dodgers, 4–2; 1981 World Series: Dodgers defeat Yankees, 4–2; 2024 World Series: Dodgers defeat Yankees, 4–1

Locations of the Los Angeles Dodgers and New York Yankees

The Dodgers–Yankees rivalry is a rivalry in Major League Baseball. The Los Angeles Dodgers are a member club of the National League (NL) West division, and the New York Yankees are a member club of the American League (AL) East division. The teams have met 12 times in the World Series, more than any other two teams, with the Yankees winning eight times and the Dodgers four times.

The rivalry began in New York City, when the Dodgers played in Brooklyn and the Yankees in the Bronx. After the Dodgers moved to Los Angeles in 1958, the rivalry continued as the teams represented the two largest cities on each coast of the United States. Fan support has added to the notoriety of the series as both teams are supported by two of the largest fanbases in North America.

Although the rivalry's significance arose from the two teams' numerous World Series meetings, the Yankees and Dodgers did not meet in the World Series between 1981 and 2024. They did not play each other again in a non-exhibition game until 2004, when they played a three-game interleague series. Nevertheless, games between the two teams have drawn sellout crowds.

The two teams met in the 2024 World Series for the first time in 43 years, with the Dodgers winning the series in 5 games.

== World Series matchups ==
=== A new team in town, new stadiums built, Subway Series established ===
At the dawn of the 20th century, the American League was in its infancy, and one of its charter franchises was the original Baltimore Orioles, was replaced by a franchise in New York. The league, however, recognized that it required a presence in New York City, the country's largest market, in order to survive. Hence, it moved the Orioles to New York, which was already the home of two National League franchises, the Brooklyn Dodgers and New York Giants. The new team was eventually called the New York Highlanders due to their home field being Hilltop Park from 1903 to 1912.

After the Highlanders allowed the Giants to play at Hilltop Park when the latter's home stadium, the Polo Grounds, was undergoing reconstruction from a fire, the Giants invited the Highlanders to share the Polo Grounds with them. Since the Highlanders were no longer playing at higher elevations, they changed their name to the New York Yankees. The Dodgers also opened up their new field, Ebbets Field, in Brooklyn. Their opening game at the stadium was an exhibition game against the Highlanders on April 5, 1913 where future Yankee manager Casey Stengel had the game-winning hit for the Dodgers. The Highlanders would officially be called the Yankees later that year.

In 1920, the Giants notified the Yankees that they would have to find a new stadium of their own for the 1921 season. The Giants rescinded that eviction notice and allowed the Yankees to stay until the end of the 1922 season, when the Giants renovated the Polo Grounds and increased seating capacity from 38,000 to 50,000. The following year, the Yankees moved across the Harlem River to the original Yankee Stadium in the Bronx.

=== 1941: First meeting between the Bronx Bombers and "Dem Bums" ===
The Yankees and Brooklyn Dodgers first met in the 1941 World Series. In Game 4, with the Yankees leading the series two games to one, the Dodgers led by one going to the top of the ninth inning and, with two outs, just barely missed getting the third out and wound up losing the game. With two outs, the Yankees' Tommy Henrich swung and missed with two strikes, but reached on a passed ball, as Dodger catcher Mickey Owen failed to hold on to the pitch. Henrich reached first base on the play. Owen recalled the incident:

It was a great breaking curve that I should have had, but I guess the ball hit the side of my glove. It got away from me, and by the time I got hold of it, near the corner of the Brooklyn dugout, I couldn't have thrown anybody out at first.

Joe DiMaggio followed Henrich's at bat with a single before Charlie Keller hit a double to drive in both Henrich and DiMaggio and give the Yankees a 5–4 lead. After Bill Dickey walked, he and Keller scored on a Joe Gordon double to make the final score 7–4. The next day, the Yankees clinched the first series match-up between the two teams in the start of what would become a long-lasting rivalry.

=== 1947–53: "Wait 'til next year!" ===
Six years later, the 1947 World Series had a dramatic moment in Game 6. The Dodgers' Al Gionfriddo was placed in left field for defensive purposes and robbed Joe DiMaggio of a game-tying three-run home run. DiMaggio was visibly disgusted by the outcome of the play when rounding the bases in one of the few emotional displays of his career. The Dodgers won the game and forced a do-or-die Game 7, only to fall.

Dramatic defensive plays would be seen again, this time by the Yankees in the 1952 contest, as Billy Martin came outside the camera coverage area to catch a pop-fly after Brooklyn had threatened to take the lead in Game 7. Martin would go on to be the hero once more in the 1953 series with a series record 12 hits, including the winning hit of the series-clinching game off of Clem Labine.

Brooklyn signed Jackie Robinson to not only break the color line, but to bolster the lineup. Robinson, along with outfielder Duke Snider and pitcher Don Newcombe, sparked Brooklyn to four National League pennants between 1947 and 1953. Every time during this period, however, the World Series ended poorly for the Dodgers and gave the Dodger fans their rallying cry: "Wait 'til next year!"

During the 1953 World Series, long time Dodgers announcer Red Barber refused to man the broadcast booth due to a compensation dispute with Gillette. Barber jumped ship to the Yankees and joined Mel Allen to call the games for the Yankees. Struggling to find a replacement, the Dodgers gave the call to a 25-year-old named Vin Scully, the youngest man to ever call a World Series game for a major network. Scully would continue as a Dodgers broadcaster for another six decades.

=== 1955: "This IS next year!" ===
Finally, in 1955 the Dodgers reversed matters, prevailing over the Yankees in seven games to win their only World Series in Brooklyn. Thus came the slogan, This IS next year.

=== 1956: Don Larsen's perfect game ===
Brooklyn fell short of repeating the next season, falling in seven games to the Yankees. That year's team suffered some ignominy in being on the losing end of Don Larsen's perfect game in Game 5, which was the first of only three no-hitters ever pitched in postseason play.

In both the 1955 and 1956 World Series, the home team won the first six games of the World Series, but lost Game 7. It would not be until 1987 when the home team won all seven games of a World Series. However, the Yankees became the first American League team to lose a World Series in which the home team won all seven games, in 2001.

Former locations of the Brooklyn Dodgers and New York Yankees

The 1956 World Series would be the last Subway Series of the 1900s and the last to include one of the National League's charter franchises.

=== 1963: Koufax dominance ===
After the Dodgers' move to Los Angeles for the 1958 season, it would take them two dominating pitchers (Sandy Koufax and Don Drysdale), a speedy shortstop (Maury Wills) and a proficient outfielder (Tommy Davis) to spark them to a pennant in 1963. They swept the Yankees (consisting of Mickey Mantle, Roger Maris, and Whitey Ford) in four straight games to win their second World Series since moving to Los Angeles, having won in 1959, with the Bronx Bombers not taking a single lead against the powerful Los Angeles pitching staff and being limited to just four runs in the entire series, the first meeting between teams from New York City and Los Angeles for a major professional sports championship. Koufax pitched two complete games with a 1.50 ERA and 23 strikeouts and was named the World Series Most Valuable Player.

Dodgers broadcaster Vin Scully said that although the Dodgers won four World Series titles in 10 years, he said that this championship was the biggest of those four because "the ultimate was not only beating the Yankees but sweeping them in four", but said that "to New York fans it was still the old Brooklyn Dodgers and there was a lot of bitterness toward them."

=== 1977: The Bronx Is Burning ===
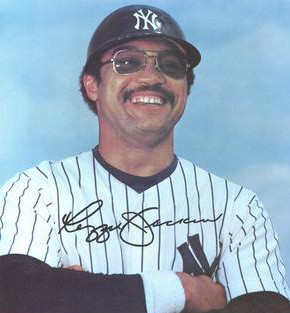
Mr. October: Reggie Jackson hit three home runs in Game 6 of the 1977 World Series against the Dodgers to win the series for the Yankees.

After 14 years, sophomore manager Tommy Lasorda led a young Dodgers team to the 1977 World Series where they faced Billy Martin and the Yankees. The two managers were involved in a fist fight during the 1956 season while playing for the two teams they were now managing. The Yankees were coming off a controversy ridden season. Furious at their loss to The Big Red Machine in the 1976 World Series, owner George Steinbrenner had signed slugger Reggie Jackson to the team. Jackson immediately created friction in the clubhouse between himself and Billy Martin as well as captain Thurman Munson, the defending AL MVP. New York City itself was going through a financial crisis under Mayor Abraham Beame and experienced the Son of Sam and a major blackout, all chronicled in The Bronx Is Burning. Despite the controversy, the Yankees managed to play together and win the pennant to face the Dodgers in the World Series.

The Dodgers featured an infield of Steve Garvey at first, Davey Lopes at second, Ron Cey at third, and Bill Russell at shortstop, in addition to slugger Reggie Smith, and pitching duo (Don Sutton and Tommy John). In addition to Jackson and Munson, the Yankees had Bucky Dent and Graig Nettles, Cy Young Award-winning closer Sparky Lyle, young pitcher Ron Guidry, and speedsters Willie Randolph and Mickey Rivers. The Dodgers appeared primed to win the Series, but Reggie Jackson put on his "Mr. October" show as he hit three home runs in Game 6 off three pitches to lead the Yanks to their first World Series championship since 1962.

=== 1978: Bucky Dent's Playoffs ===
The next season, the Yankees won their division, thanks in large part to a timely home run from Bucky Dent in a one-game playoff against the Boston Red Sox. They went to the World Series for the third straight year where they faced the Dodgers for the second straight year. The Dodgers won the first two games of the Series thanks to rookie pitcher Bob Welch, but New York won the next four to take the 75th Fall Classic.

=== 1981: Changing of the Guard ===
In 1981, the fortunes turned in LA's favor, as rookie pitcher Fernando Valenzuela won National League Rookie of the Year and Cy Young Award honors. But the Yankees had American League Rookie of the Year Dave Righetti (traded from the Rangers in exchange for Lyle) and the 1–2 relief punch of set-up man Ron Davis and closer Rich Gossage. The Yankees won the first two contests, but LA, led by Valenzuela and first baseman Steve Garvey, won the next four to claim their first World Series title since 1965 in a strike-shortened season. Fallout from the series led to Reggie Jackson being controversially dismissed a bit later, and owner George Steinbrenner started a public feud with Dave Winfield, who had a poor performance in the series. After the series ended, Steinbrenner issued a public apology to the City of New York for his team's performance, while at the same time assuring the fans that plans to put the team together for 1982 would begin immediately. Players and press alike criticized the owner for doing this, as most people felt losing in the World Series was not something that needed to be apologized for.

Lasorda said of the revenge for what Jackson did to the Dodgers in 1977 and 1978: "We were suffering and the guy was making a fool out of us. I was hoping and praying we would get another shot at him."

This led to the Yankees not winning a World Series in the 1980s, one of two decades they would not win a championship since moving to the Bronx (the other being the 2010s). In contrast, the Dodgers were able to defeat the Oakland Athletics in the 1988 World Series. The Yankees would find success the next decade, winning four championships in five years from 1996–2000.

The 1981 World Series would be their last postseason meeting until the 2024 World Series, the last time ever the Dodgers visited the old Yankee Stadium, and the last meeting between teams from New York City and Los Angeles for a major professional sports championship until the 2014 Stanley Cup Final.

== Rivalry in the 21st century ==
=== Interleague matchups ===
The introduction of interleague play in 1997 allowed the Yankees and Dodgers to play each other in the regular season. For the first several decades of interleague play, however, the Dodgers and Yankees had different regular interleague partners: the Dodgers typically played the Angels, and the Yankees typically played the Mets. Before the adoption of universal interleague play in 2023, the Dodgers and Yankees played only five interleague series. In addition, the Dodgers never played a regular season series at the original Yankee Stadium.

Dodgers-Yankees matchups have tended to be popular with fans, and frequently result in sell-out crowds. The first time the Dodgers visited the Bronx since interleague play was introduced, in June 2013, their doubleheader sold out the new Yankee Stadium.

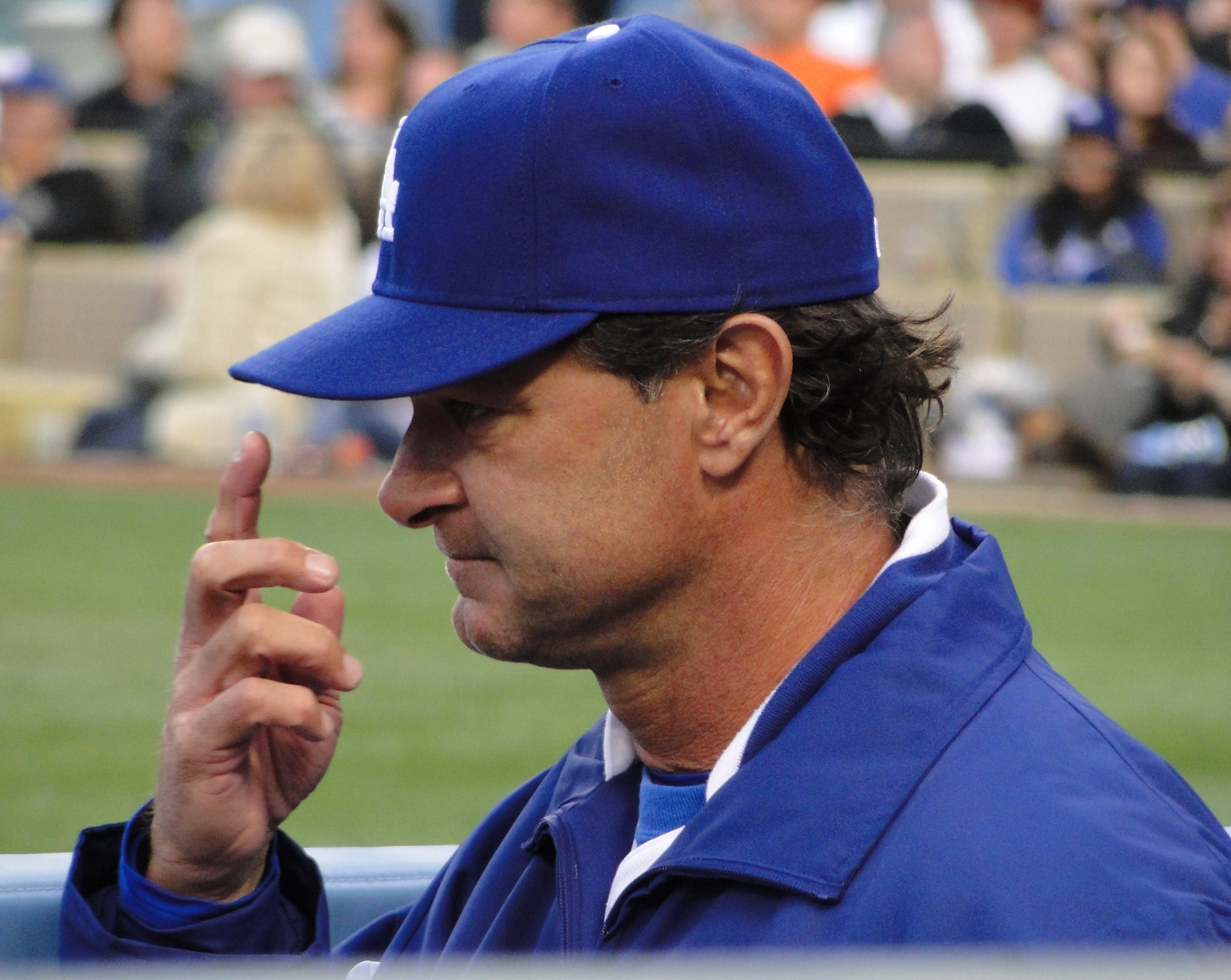
Yankees great Don Mattingly, then manager of the Dodgers.

Yankee greats Joe Torre and Don Mattingly managed the Dodgers from 2008 to 2010 and 2011 to 2015, respectively, adding more flavor to the Dodgers-Yankees series in 2010 and 2013. During the 2010 season, the Yankees and Dodgers played at Dodger Stadium on June 25–27, the first time that Torre and Mattingly faced the Yankees as Dodger coaches. The Yankees were victorious, winning the series two games to one. The teams met again during the 2013 season. The doubleheader of June 19 was not just the Dodgers' return to the Bronx after a long absence; it was also Mattingly's first return to the Bronx as a game participant since the Dodgers promoted him to manager following Torre's retirement. (Mattingly had previously visited the new Yankee Stadium on the night they honored George Steinbrenner with a monument in Monument Park.)

The Dodgers and Yankees have played each other in every regular season since 2023.

=== 2024: First World Series in 43 years ===
In 2024, the Dodgers and Yankees finished with the best records in the National and American Leagues, and met in the World Series for the first time in 43 years. The series was also notable for it featuring who were considered the two best players in the sport, the Yankees' Aaron Judge and the Dodgers' Shohei Ohtani.

The Dodgers won the first three games and took the title in five games. However, aside from Game 4 (which Dodgers manager Dave Roberts was said to have punted due to a lack of healthy starting pitchers), each game was reasonably competitive. Writing for ESPN, Jeff Passan noted that although the Dodgers "scored 25 runs to the Yankees' 24 ... the Dodgers won the World Series in convincing fashion, over five games, because they were better in close contests." In particular, the Yankees surrendered an extra-inning, walk-off grand slam to Freddie Freeman in Game 1 and a 5–0 lead in Game 5.

== Season-by-season results ==
Dodgers vs. Yankees Season-by-Season Results
1940s (Yankees, 12–5)

| Season | Season series | | at Brooklyn Dodgers | at New York Yankees | Overall series | Notes |
|---|---|---|---|---|---|---|
| 1941 World Series | Yankees | 4‍–‍1 | Yankees, 3‍–‍0 | Tie, 1‍–‍1 | Yankees; 4‍–‍1 | First postseason meeting and Subway Series between the two teams, first Yankees win |
| 1947 World Series | Yankees | 4‍–‍3 | Dodgers, 2‍–‍1 | Yankees, 3‍–‍1 | Yankees; 8‍–‍4 | |
| 1949 World Series | Yankees | 4‍–‍1 | Yankees, 3‍–‍0 | Tie, 1‍–‍1 | Yankees; 12‍–‍5 | |

1950s (Yankees, 15–12)

| Season | Season series | | at Brooklyn Dodgers | at New York Yankees | Overall series | Notes |
|---|---|---|---|---|---|---|
| 1952 World Series | Yankees | 4‍–‍3 | Yankees, 3‍–‍1 | Dodgers, 2‍–‍1 | Yankees; 16‍–‍8 | |
| 1953 World Series | Yankees | 4‍–‍2 | Dodgers, 2‍–‍1 | Yankees, 3‍–‍0 | Yankees; 20‍–‍10 | |
| 1955 World Series | Dodgers | 4‍–‍3 | Dodgers, 3‍–‍0 | Yankees, 3‍–‍1 | Yankees; 23‍–‍14 | First Dodgers' series win over the Yankees |
| 1956 World Series | Yankees | 4‍–‍3 | Dodgers, 3‍–‍1 | Yankees, 3‍–‍0 | Yankees; 27‍–‍17 | Final Subway Series between the two teams |

1960s (Dodgers, 4–0)

| Season | Season series | | at Los Angeles Dodgers | at New York Yankees | Overall series | Notes |
|---|---|---|---|---|---|---|
| 1963 World Series | Dodgers | 4‍–‍0 | Dodgers, 2‍–‍0 | Dodgers, 2‍–‍0 | Yankees; 27‍–‍21 | |

1970s (Yankees, 8–4)

| Season | Season series | | at Los Angeles Dodgers | at New York Yankees | Overall series | Notes |
|---|---|---|---|---|---|---|
| 1977 World Series | Yankees | 4‍–‍2 | Yankees, 2‍–‍1 | Yankees, 2‍–‍1 | Yankees; 31‍–‍23 | |
| 1978 World Series | Yankees | 4‍–‍2 | Dodgers, 2‍–‍1 | Yankees, 3‍–‍0 | Yankees; 35‍–‍25 | |

1980s (Dodgers, 4–2)

| Season | Season series | | at Los Angeles Dodgers | at New York Yankees | Overall series | Notes |
|---|---|---|---|---|---|---|
| 1981 World Series | Dodgers | 4‍–‍2 | Dodgers, 3‍–‍0 | Yankees, 2‍–‍1 | Yankees; 37‍–‍29 | |

2000s (Dodgers, 2–1)

| Season | Season series | | at Los Angeles Dodgers | at New York Yankees | Overall series | Notes |
|---|---|---|---|---|---|---|
| 2004 | Dodgers | 2‍–‍1 | Dodgers, 2‍–‍1 | no games | Yankees; 38‍–‍31 | |

2010s (Yankees, 7–6)

| Season | Season series | | at Los Angeles Dodgers | at New York Yankees | Overall series | Notes |
|---|---|---|---|---|---|---|
| 2010 | Yankees | 2‍–‍1 | Yankees, 2‍–‍1 | no games | Yankees; 40‍–‍32 | |
| 2013 | Tie | 2‍–‍2 | Tie, 1‍–‍1 | Tie, 1‍–‍1 | Yankees; 42‍–‍34 | |
| 2016 | Dodgers | 2‍–‍1 | no games | Dodgers, 2‍–‍1 | Yankees; 43‍–‍36 | |
| 2019 | Yankees | 2‍–‍1 | Yankees, 2‍–‍1 | no games | Yankees; 45‍–‍37 | |

2020s (Dodgers, 11–6)

| Season | Season series | | at Los Angeles Dodgers | at New York Yankees | Overall series | Notes |
|---|---|---|---|---|---|---|
| 2023 | Yankees | 2‍–‍1 | Yankees, 2‍–‍1 | no games | Yankees; 47‍–‍38 | Permanent adoption of the three-game series format, with location alternating every season. |
| 2024 | Dodgers | 2‍–‍1 | no games | Dodgers, 2‍–‍1 | Yankees; 48‍–‍40 | |
| 2024 World Series | Dodgers | 4‍–‍1 | Dodgers, 2‍–‍0 | Dodgers, 2‍–‍1 | Yankees; 49‍–‍44 | |
| 2025 | Dodgers | 2‍–‍1 | Dodgers, 2‍–‍1 | no games | Yankees; 50‍–‍46 | Dodgers win 2025 World Series |
| 2026 | Dodgers | 2‍–‍1 | no games | Dodgers, 2‍–‍1 | Yankees; 51‍–‍48 | |

Summary of Results

| Season | Season series | | at Brooklyn/Los Angeles Dodgers | at New York Yankees | Notes |
|---|---|---|---|---|---|
| Regular season games | Dodgers | 15‍–‍13 | Yankees, 9‍–‍8 | Dodgers, 7‍–‍4 | |
| Postseason games | Yankees | 38‍–‍33 | Dodgers, 21‍–‍15 | Yankees, 23‍–‍12 | |
| Postseason series | Yankees | 8‍–‍4 | n/a | n/a | World Series: 1941, 1947, 1949, 1952, 1953, 1955, 1956, 1963, 1977, 1978, 1981, 2024 |
| Regular and postseason | Yankees | 51‍–‍48 | Dodgers, 29‍–‍24 | Yankees, 27‍–‍19 | |

== See also ==
- Dodgers–Giants rivalry
- Giants–Yankees rivalry
- Mets–Yankees rivalry

=== Histories ===
- Brooklyn Dodgers
- Los Angeles Dodgers
- New York Yankees
