= Clem Labine =

American baseball player (1926–2007)

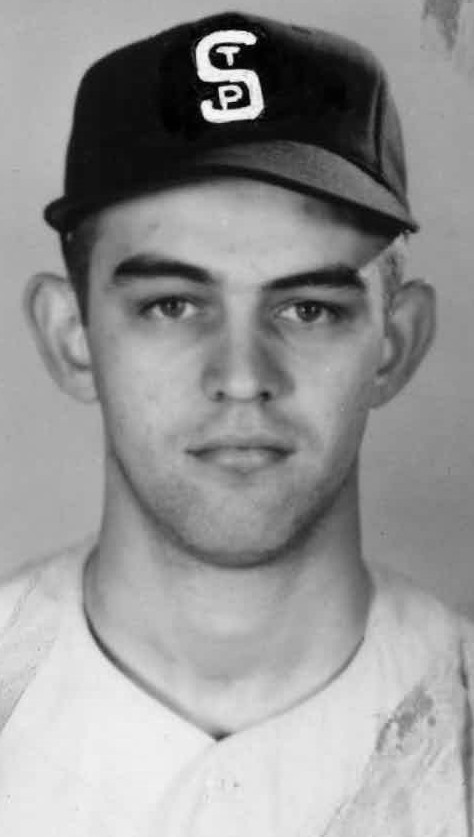
- Labine in 1949
- Pitcher
- Born: August 6, 1926; Lincoln, Rhode Island, U.S.
- Died: March 2, 2007 (aged 80); Vero Beach, Florida, U.S.
- Batted: Right Threw: Right

MLB debut
- April 18, 1950, for the Brooklyn Dodgers

Last MLB appearance
- April 24, 1962, for the New York Mets

MLB statistics
- Win–loss record: 77–56
- Earned run average: 3.63
- Strikeouts: 551
- Saves: 96
- Stats at Baseball Reference

Teams
- Brooklyn / Los Angeles Dodgers (1950–1960); Detroit Tigers (1960); Pittsburgh Pirates (1960–1961); New York Mets (1962)

Career highlights and awards
- 2× All-Star (1956, 1957); 3× World Series champion (1955, 1959, 1960)

Clement Walter Labine (August 6, 1926 – March 2, 2007) was an American right-handed relief pitcher in Major League Baseball (MLB) best known for his years with the Brooklyn / Los Angeles Dodgers from 1950 to 1960.

As a key member of the Dodgers in the early 1950s, he helped the team to its first World Series title in 1955 with a win and a save in four games. He is one of nine players in MLB history to have won back-to back World Series championships on different teams, the other eight being Joc Pederson, Ben Zobrist, Jake Peavy, Jack Morris, Bill Skowron, Don Gullett, Allie Clark and Ryan Theriot doing so with two teams, and pitcher Will Smith doing so with three different teams in consecutive seasons.

He held the National League (NL) record for career saves from 1958 until 1962; his 96 career saves ranked fourth in MLB history when he retired. At the time of his retirement, he also held the Dodgers franchise record for both career saves (96) and career games pitched (425).

== Early life ==
Labine was born on August 6, 1926, in Lincoln, Rhode Island in a French Canadian family, and grew up in nearby Woonsocket. He was raised Catholic and was an altar boy in Woonsocket's Precious Blood Parish. He attended Woonsocket High School, where he played basketball and baseball (as a first baseman), excelling most in the former. Labine received a basketball scholarship to Rhode Island State College, but the school dropped the basketball program in 1943.

Labine then signed to play baseball as a pitcher for the Brooklyn Dodgers, and was assigned to the Newport News Dodgers of the Class-B Piedmont League in 1944. He left baseball, however, when he began service as a paratrooper with the 82nd airborne infantry division in World War II, fighting in the European theater of war.

== Minor leagues ==
Labine returned from the war to play briefly for Newport News in 1946, pitching in only three games. In 1947, he played for Newport News, and for the Asheville Tourists of the Class-B Tri-State League, where he had a 6–0 won–loss record and 2.07 earned run average (ERA). In 1948, he was promoted to the Single-A Pueblo Dodgers of the Western League, where Labine appeared in 40 games with a 13–10 record and 4.32 ERA.

Labine played all of the 1949 season, and the vast majority of the 1950 season, with the Triple-A Saint Paul Saints. In 1949, he pitched 139 innings in 64 games, with a 12–6 record and 3.50 ERA; and in 1950, was 11–7 in 37 games, with a 4.99 ERA. In 1949, he had been the team's top relief pitcher (fireman), noted for his curveball and control. He was called up to the Dodgers after the Saints' season ended in September 1950, pitching only two innings in one game.

== Major leagues ==
=== Brooklyn Dodgers ===
==== 1951-54 ====
Labine began the 1951 season with the Dodgers, but was sent back to the Saints to bolster a weak pitching staff in May 1951. Saints' manager Clay Hooper principally used Labine as a starting pitcher, and he went 9–6 with a 2.62 ERA. Labine returned to the Dodgers in August. He pitched in 14 games for the Dodgers during the season, starting six, while compiling a 5–1 record with a 2.20 ERA and two shutouts. He was third in National League (NL) Rookie of the Year voting (Willie Mays winning the award).

The Dodgers and New York Giants, led by Willie Mays, finished the 1951 regular season in a tie. They played a three-game series to determine the National League (NL) pennant winner. The Giants won the series two games to one, with the Dodgers winning only Game 2. Dodgers manager Chuck Dressen chose the rookie Labine to pitch Game 2 and he shut out the Giants, 10–0; not allowing a hit for the final 4.2 innings. The Giants famously won the series on Bobby Thomson's "Shot Heard 'Round The World" home run against Ralph Branca in the bottom of the ninth inning of the decisive third game.

In 1952, Labine pitched in 25 games for the Dodgers, starting nine, but suffered an injury that limited his usefulness. He had an 8–4 record, but pitched only 77 innings and had an ERA above five runs per game. The Dodgers won the NL pennant and lost the 1952 World Series in seven games to the New York Yankees, but Labine did not play in the World Series.

Labine rebounded in 1953, pitching 110.1 innings in 37 games, with an 11–6 record and 2.77 ERA. He served as a relief pitcher in all but seven games, and had seven saves. The Dodgers lost again to the Yankees in the World Series (four games to two). Labine was the losing pitcher in Games 1 and 6, pitching in relief both times. He pitched the ninth inning of the Dodgers' Game 4 victory, earning a save. After giving up the Series winning base hit to the Yankees' Billy Martin in the ninth inning of Game 6, Labine was too distressed to speak to reporters after the game.

Labine pitched in 47 games the following season, with only two starts. He had a 7–6 record, four saves and a 4.15 ERA. Teammate Jim Hughes was the team's closer in 1954, pitching a major league leading 60 games in relief, with an NL leading 24 saves.

==== 1955 championship season ====
In early 1955, following advice from teammate Pee Wee Reese, Labine developed a significantly improved sinker to go along with his curveball; raising the quality of his pitching. Manager Walt Alston also focused on using Labine as a relief pitcher, only starting Labine occasionally when Dodger starters had sore arms. Labine led the major leagues in games pitched with 60 (52 in relief). Labine also led all major league pitchers with 10 relief victories, and earned a career-best 13 wins overall. He had a 13–5 record (10–2 as a relief pitcher), 11 saves, a 3.24 ERA, and had exceptional control over his pitches that year. Labine was 15th in NL Most Valuable Player (MVP) voting (won by teammate catcher Roy Campanella).

In 1955, the Dodgers brought a world championship to Brooklyn, finally defeating the Yankees in the World Series (four games to three). Labine pitched four games in relief, with one win, one save and a 2.89 ERA. This proved to Alston that Labine was a great relief pitcher, and would be happy if he never had to start Labine. Labine came on in relief with two outs in the fifth inning of Game 4, with the bases loaded and Dodgers down two games to one in the Series. He got the final out without allowing a run, and pitched four more innings as the winning pitcher in the game, Campanella stating Labine had a good sinker that day.

The Dodgers won again the next day when Labine pitched three innings in relief of Roger Craig, earning a save. This was Labine's fourth appearance in the first five games of the 1955 World Series. Entering Game 5 in the seventh inning in relief of Craig who had given up a home run and walk, Labine caused Irv Noren to hit into a double play (which manager Alston had been hoping for when he called the sinker ball throwing Labine in to pitch). Labine pitched the final two innings, giving up one run, but the Dodgers won 5–3.

==== 1956 and World Series 10-inning shutout ====
In 1956, Labine was named an All-Star for the first time. He pitched in 62 games (starting only 3), with a major league leading 19 saves; also leading the major leagues in games finished (47). He had a 10–6 record and 3.35 ERA.

Once again the Dodgers played the Yankees in the World Series, losing four games to three. The Yankees won Game 5 when Don Larsen pitched the only perfect game in World Series history, and led the series three games to two. With the Dodgers' season at stake, Alston made a surprise choice of having Labine start Game 6. Labine pitched a 10-inning shutout, winning a pitcher's duel with the Yankees' Bob Turley, 1–0; victory coming in the bottom of the 10th inning on a Jackie Robinson hit. Campanella called it Labine's career-best pitching performance when pitching an extended number of innings.

==== Final Dodgers' seasons (1957-60) ====
Labine was an All-Star for the second and last time in 1957. During the Dodgers' last season in Brooklyn, Labine pitched in 58 games all in relief. He led the NL in saves again with 17, to go along with a 5–7 record and 3.44 ERA. Although the save did not become an official statistic until 1969, Labine has been retroactively credited with leading the NL twice (1956-57) in that category.

Labine accompanied the Dodgers to Los Angeles when they relocated after the 1957 season. He pitched in 52 games (starting two), with 14 saves (second in the NL to Roy Face's 20). He had a 6–6 record, but his ERA rose to 4.15. In 1958, he surpassed Al Brazle's NL record of 60 career saves.

In 1959, Labine broke Brickyard Kennedy's franchise record of 381 games pitched. He pitched in 56 games on the season, but had only 8 saves, with a 5–10 record and 3.93 ERA. The Dodgers won the World Series again that year, defeating the Chicago White Sox four games to two, although Labine pitched only one inning in Game 1's 11–0 loss to the White Sox.

=== Detroit Tigers, Pittsburgh Pirates, New York Mets ===
In 1960, Labine appeared in 13 games for the Dodgers, with a 5.82 ERA in only 17 innings pitched, when the Dodgers traded him to the Detroit Tigers in June for Ray Semproch and cash. The Tigers subsequently released him on August 15, 1960, after he pitched 14 games for them, going 0–3, with an ERA of 5.12. The Pittsburgh Pirates signed Labine the following day. The Pirates were committed to signing him, while the Yankees had asked Labine to wait so they could determine if they needed him; an option Labine rejected.

The Pirates were in the NL pennant race and needed another right-handed reliever to complement Roy Face. Labine proved to be a valuable addition to the Pirates' bullpen and played a key role as he helped the Pirates win the NL pennant and go on to the 1960 World Series. In 15 games for the Pirates through the remainder of the season, he compiled a record of 3–0 with three saves and an ERA of 1.48. Labine appeared only in three blowout losses during the series win over the New York Yankees (Games 2, 3 and 6); however, the Pirates won the World Series four games to three on Bill Mazeroski's Game 7 ninth inning home run.

He is one of nine players in MLB history (through 2024) to have won back-to back World Series championships on different teams, the other eight being Joc Pederson, Ben Zobrist, Jake Peavy, Jack Morris, Bill Skowron, Don Gullett, Allie Clark and Ryan Theriot doing so with two teams, and pitcher Will Smith doing so with three different teams in consecutive seasons.

Labine pitched in 56 games for the Pirates in 1961 (starting only once), with eight saves and a 3.69 ERA. The Pirates released him after the season's end, and he signed with the New York Mets in February 1962. He ended his career with the New York Mets on May 1, 1962, when the team released him. He had pitched in three games during the Mets' debut 1962 season, including an inning in the Mets' first game. Later that year, the Pirates' Roy Face passed Labine's NL mark of 94 career saves.

=== Career ===
Over all or parts of 13 seasons, Labine appeared in 513 games, winning 77 and losing 56 (.579), with a 3.63 ERA. He appeared in 13 World Series games, winning two and losing two, with a 3.16 ERA. His 96 career saves then trailed only Johnny Murphy (107), Ellis Kinder (102), and Firpo Marberry (101) in major league history. In 1966, Labine's Dodger career records of 425 games pitched and 83 saves were broken by Don Drysdale and Ron Perranoski, respectively.

== Life after baseball ==
Following his retirement from baseball, Labine settled again in the Woonsocket area, where he became a designer of men's athletic wear, serving as general manager for the sporting goods division of the Jacob Finklestein's & Sons manufacturing company. His son, Jay, joined the Marine Corps and lost a leg while serving in Vietnam after stepping on a landmine.

== Death ==
Labine died at age 80 in Vero Beach, Florida, one week after undergoing exploratory brain surgery following a bout with pneumonia; he had been serving as an instructor at the Dodgers' adult fantasy camp at their Dodgertown headquarters.

== See also ==
- List of Major League Baseball annual saves leaders
