= 1953 World Series =

1953 Major League Baseball championship series

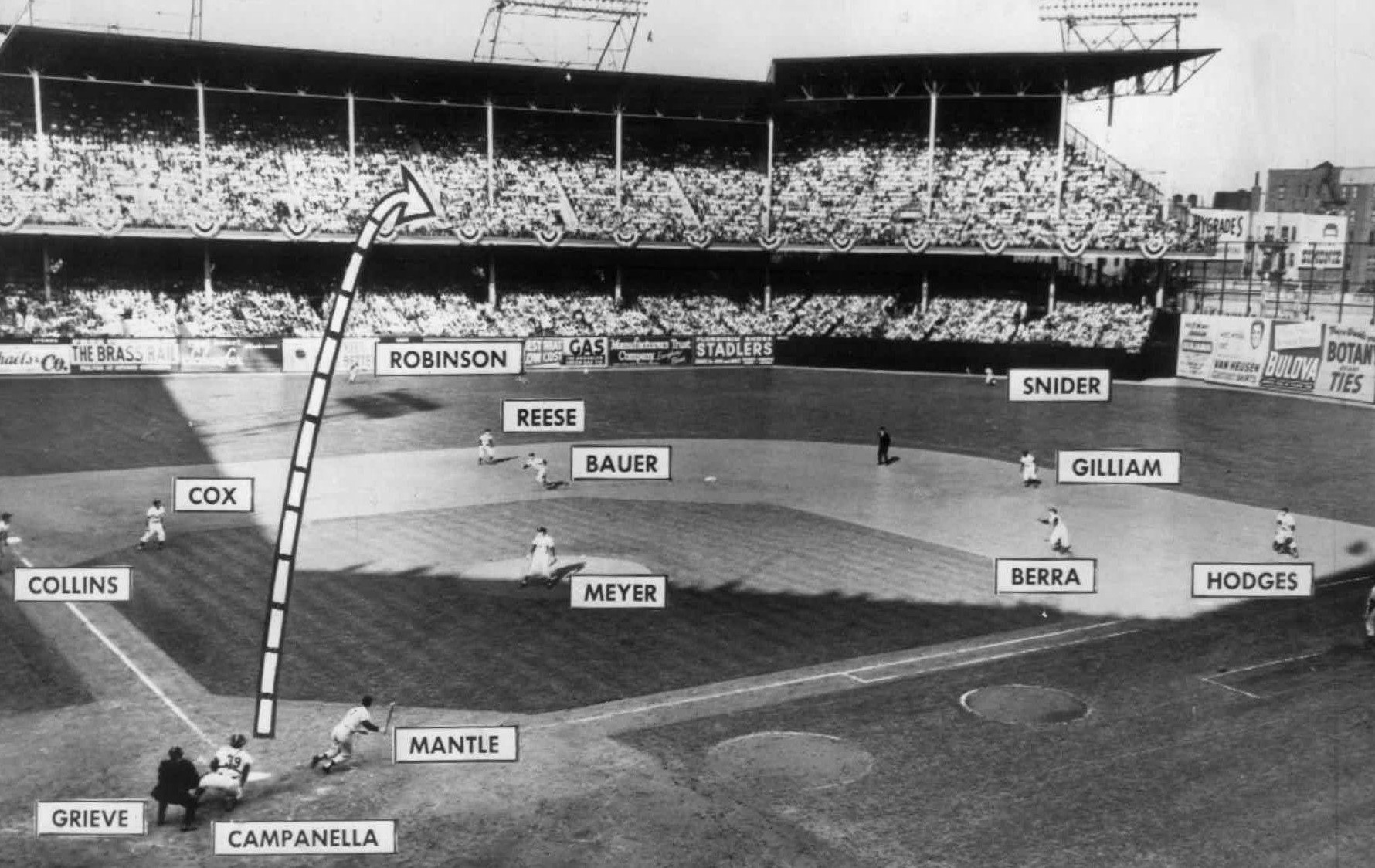
Team (Wins)	Managers	Season
New York Yankees (4)	Casey Stengel	99–52, .656, GA: 8 1/2
Brooklyn Dodgers (2)	Chuck Dressen	105–49, .682, GA: 13
- Dates: September 30–October 5
- Venue(s): Yankee Stadium (New York); Ebbets Field (Brooklyn)
- Umpires: Bill Grieve (AL), Bill Stewart (NL), Eddie Hurley (AL), Artie Gore (NL), Hank Soar (AL: outfield only), Frank Dascoli (NL: outfield only)
- Hall of Famers: Yankees: Casey Stengel (manager); Yogi Berra; Whitey Ford; Mickey Mantle; Johnny Mize; Phil Rizzuto; Dodgers: Roy Campanella; Gil Hodges; Pee Wee Reese; Jackie Robinson; Duke Snider; Dick Williams‡ ‡ Elected as a manager

Broadcast
- Television: NBC
- TV announcers: Mel Allen and Vin Scully
- Radio: Mutual
- Radio announcers: Al Helfer and Gene Kelly

The 1953 World Series was the championship series in Major League Baseball for the 1953 season. The 50th edition of the World Series, it was a best-of-seven playoff that matched the American League (AL) champion and four-time defending World Series champion New York Yankees against the National League (NL) champion Brooklyn Dodgers in a rematch of the 1952 Series, and the fourth such matchup between the two teams in the past seven seasons. The Yankees won in six games for their fifth consecutive title—a mark which has not been equalled—and their 16th overall. It was also the last of seven consecutive World Series wins by teams from the American League, the longest such streak for the AL in series history. Billy Martin was the standout player of the series as he hit .500 with a record-tying 12 hits and a walk-off RBI single in Game 6.

== Summary ==
AL New York Yankees (4) vs. NL Brooklyn Dodgers (2)

Game	Date	Score	Location	Time	Attendance
1	September 30	Brooklyn Dodgers – 5, New York Yankees – 9	Yankee Stadium	3:10	69,734
2	October 1	Brooklyn Dodgers – 2, New York Yankees – 4	Yankee Stadium	2:42	66,786
3	October 2	New York Yankees – 2, Brooklyn Dodgers – 3	Ebbets Field	3:00	35,270
4	October 3	New York Yankees – 3, Brooklyn Dodgers – 7	Ebbets Field	2:46	36,775
5	October 4	New York Yankees – 11, Brooklyn Dodgers – 7	Ebbets Field	3:02	36,775
6	October 5	Brooklyn Dodgers – 3, New York Yankees – 4	Yankee Stadium	2:55	62,370

== Matchups ==
=== Game 1 ===
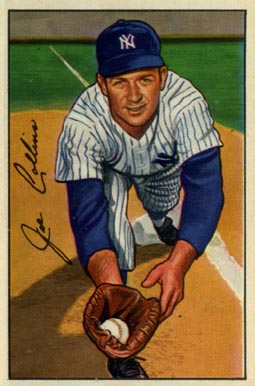
Joe Collins

September 30, 1953 1:00 pm (ET) at Yankee Stadium in Bronx, New York
Team	1	2	3	4	5	6	7	8	9	R	H	E
Brooklyn	0	0	0	0	1	3	1	0	0	5	12	2
New York	4	0	0	0	1	0	1	3	X	9	12	0
WP: Johnny Sain (1–0) LP: Clem Labine (0–1); Home runs: BRO: Jim Gilliam (1), Gil Hodges (1), George Shuba (1); NYY: Yogi Berra (1), Joe Collins (1)

Before a full house (69,734 in attendance), the Yankees scored four runs in the first inning. Brooklyn starter Carl Erskine did not last past the first. After a one-out walk, an RBI triple by Hank Bauer put the Yankees up 1–0. After a strikeout, two more walks loaded the bases before Billy Martin cleared them with a triple of his own and the Dodgers pinch-hit for Erskine in the top of the second. They did not score off Allie Reynolds until the fifth on a Jim Gilliam home run. Yogi Berra matched it in the bottom of the fifth with a home run of his own, and the Yankee lead looked safe until a leadoff home run by Gil Hodges and two-run home run by pinch-hitter George Shuba chased Reynolds in the sixth. Brooklyn tied it an inning later against Johnny Sain with consecutive leadoff singles by Roy Campanella, Hodges and Carl Furillo. A home run by unsung first baseman Joe Collins proved the game-winner off Clem Labine, with winning pitcher Johnny Sain providing two more runs himself in the eighth off Ben Wade with a two-run double. Sain then scored on a Joe Collins single, and pitched a scoreless ninth to give the Yankees a 9–5 win and 1–0 series lead.

=== Game 2 ===
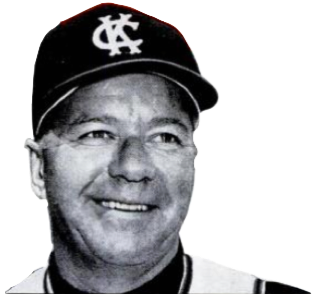
Eddie Lopat

October 1, 1953 1:00 pm (ET) at Yankee Stadium in Bronx, New York
Team	1	2	3	4	5	6	7	8	9	R	H	E
Brooklyn	0	0	0	2	0	0	0	0	0	2	9	1
New York	1	0	0	0	0	0	1	2	X	4	5	0
WP: Eddie Lopat (1–0) LP: Preacher Roe (0–1); Home runs: BRO: None; NYY: Billy Martin (1), Mickey Mantle (1)

He looked shaky in the first, walking three, hitting a batter, and allowing a sacrifice fly to Yogi Berra for the game's first run, but Brooklyn's Preacher Roe settled down after that and engaged Eddie Lopat in a complete-game pitching duel. Billy Cox's two-run double after back-to-back two-out singles in the fourth inning put the Dodgers up 2–1. Billy Martin's leadoff home run off Roe in the seventh inning tied the score. The game-winning blast came from Mickey Mantle, a two-run shot to left field in the bottom of the eighth. Brooklyn got two runners aboard in the ninth, but Lopat was able to retire Duke Snider on a game-ending grounder to second base.

=== Game 3 ===
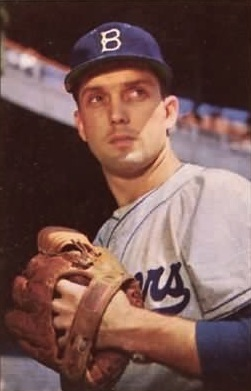
Carl Erskine

October 2, 1953 1:00 pm (ET) at Ebbets Field in Brooklyn, New York
Team	1	2	3	4	5	6	7	8	9	R	H	E
New York	0	0	0	0	1	0	0	1	0	2	6	0
Brooklyn	0	0	0	0	1	1	0	1	X	3	9	0
WP: Carl Erskine (1–0) LP: Vic Raschi (0–1); Home runs: NYY: None; BRO: Roy Campanella (1)

Although the Yankees won the Series, Brooklyn had at least one shining moment, as pitcher Carl Erskine set a new Series record by striking out 14 Yankees in Game 3. That broke Howard Ehmke's 1929 record by one. Ersk's record would stand until Sandy Koufax got 15 in 1963.

In that same game, Yogi Berra was hit twice by Erskine, making him the first American League player in World Series history to be a hit-batsman twice during the same game. The Yankees struck first in the fifth on an RBI single by Gil McDougald with runners on second and third, but the Dodgers tied it in the bottom half on Billy Cox's fielder's choice with Jackie Robinson at third. Robinson's RBI single next inning put the Dodgers up 2–1, but again the game became tied at 2–2 in the eighth on an RBI single by the Yankees' Gene Woodling. The decisive blow came in the bottom of the inning when Vic Raschi surrendered a Roy Campanella home run, which proved to be the game-winner.

=== Game 4 ===
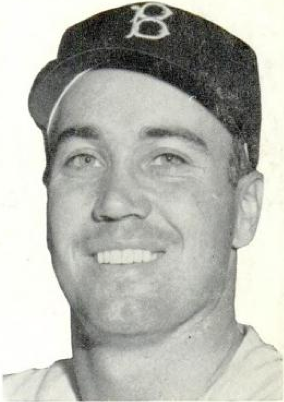
Duke Snider

October 3, 1953 1:00 pm (ET) at Ebbets Field in Brooklyn, New York
Team	1	2	3	4	5	6	7	8	9	R	H	E
New York	0	0	0	0	2	0	0	0	1	3	9	0
Brooklyn	3	0	0	1	0	2	1	0	X	7	12	0
WP: Billy Loes (1–0) LP: Whitey Ford (0–1) Sv: Clem Labine (1); Home runs: NYY: Gil McDougald (1); BRO: Duke Snider (1)

The home team won for the fourth consecutive time. Whitey Ford lasted just one inning as the Yankees' starter, allowing a leadoff ground-rule double to Jim Gilliam, who scored on Jackie Robinson's single. After a forceout, wild pitch and intentional walk, Duke Snider's two-run double made it 3–0 Dodgers. Gilliam's double in the fourth off Tom Gorman made it 4–0, but Brooklyn's lead was cut in half in the fifth when Billy Loes gave up a two-run home run to Gil McDougald. Snider's leadoff home run in the sixth off Johnny Sain made it 5–2 Dodgers, then after a double and single, Gilliam's sacrifice fly extended that lead to 6–2. Next inning, after a two-out walk, Snider's RBI double off Art Schallock made it 7–2 Dodgers. In the ninth, two singles and walk loaded the bases with no outs for the Yankees. Clem Labine relieved Loes and got two-outs before Mickey Mantle's RBI single cut the Dodgers' lead to 7–3, but Billy Martin was thrown out trying to score from second base to end the game, tying the series 2–2.

=== Game 5 ===
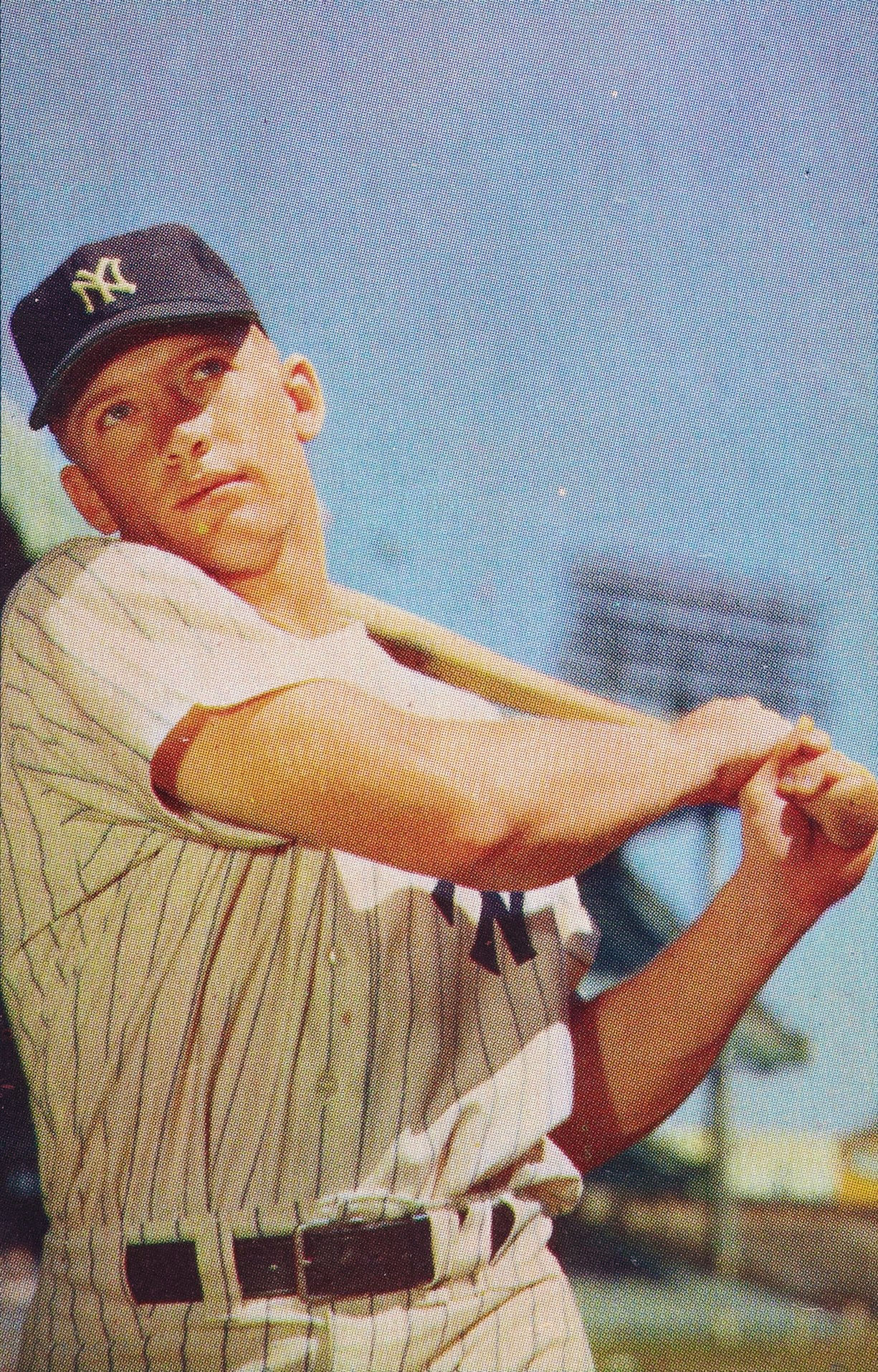
Mickey Mantle

October 4, 1953 2:00 pm (ET) at Ebbets Field in Brooklyn, New York
Team	1	2	3	4	5	6	7	8	9	R	H	E
New York	1	0	5	0	0	0	3	1	1	11	11	1
Brooklyn	0	1	0	0	1	0	0	4	1	7	14	1
WP: Jim McDonald (1–0) LP: Johnny Podres (0–1) Sv: Allie Reynolds (1); Home runs: NYY: Gene Woodling (1), Mickey Mantle (2), Billy Martin (2), Gil McDougald (2); BRO: Billy Cox (1), Jim Gilliam (2)

Yankees manager Casey Stengel gave the ball to Jim McDonald for Game 5 and, while he gave up a dozen hits, he got them a win. Brooklyn starter Johnny Podres was jolted by a Gene Woodling home run to begin the game. After the Dodgers tied the game in the second on two singles followed by shortstop Phil Rizzuto's throwing error on Carl Furillo's ground ball, Podres was chased in a five-run third. Rizzuto drew a leadoff walk, moved to third on two groundouts, and scored on when first baseman Gil Hodges misplayed Joe Collins's groundball. A hit-by-pitch and walk loaded the bases, and the first man Podres's replacement Russ Meyer faced was Mickey Mantle, who greeted him with a grand slam. Duke Snider's RBI single after a hit-by-pitch and single made it 6–2 Yankees in the fifth, but in the seventh, Billy Martin's two-run home run off Meyer extended their lead to 8–2. Rizzuto singled with two outs and scored on McDonald's double. The Yankees added another run in the eighth when Collins hit a leadoff double off Ben Wade, moved to third on a sacrifice bunt, and scored on Yogi Berra's sacrifice fly, but in the bottom of the inning McDonald allowed two singles, then an RBI single to Furillo before a three-run Billy Cox home run cut their lead to 10–6. He was relieved by Bob Kuzava, who struck out Dick Williams to end the inning. Each team got a run in the ninth on a home run, Gil McDougald for the Yankees off Joe Black and Jim Gilliam for the Dodgers off Kuzava. Allie Reynolds was brought in to retire Jackie Robinson for the final out.

=== Game 6 ===
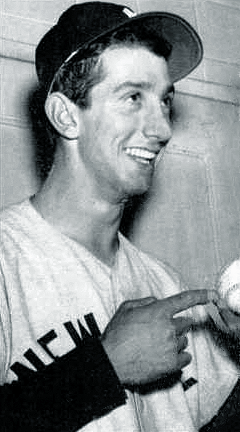
Billy Martin

October 5, 1953 1:00 pm (ET) at Yankee Stadium in Bronx, New York
Team	1	2	3	4	5	6	7	8	9	R	H	E
Brooklyn	0	0	0	0	0	1	0	0	2	3	8	3
New York	2	1	0	0	0	0	0	0	1	4	13	0
WP: Allie Reynolds (1–0) LP: Clem Labine (0–2); Home runs: BRO: Carl Furillo (1); NYY: None

In Game 6, after a walk, strikeout and single, Yogi Berra's ground-rule double put the Yankees up 1–0 in the first off Carl Erskine. After an intentional walk loaded the bases, an error on Billy Martin's ground ball made it 2–0 Yankees. Next inning, Gene Woodling's sacrifice fly after two leadoff singles made it 3–0 Yankees. Starter Whitey Ford pitched five shutout innings, but in the sixth, allowed a one-out double to Jackie Robinson, who stole third and scored on Roy Campanella's groundout. Down 3–1 in the ninth, Brooklyn rallied back on a Duke Snider walk followed by a Carl Furillo home run off Allie Reynolds. However, Yankee second baseman Billy Martin—who made a game-saving catch in Game 7 of the 1952 World Series—again ruined the Dodgers' dreams of a championship. In the bottom of the ninth, with a runner on second base, Martin drilled a Clem Labine sinker up the middle for a Series-winning RBI single.

== Aftermath ==
Dropping their seventh Series without a victory, the Dodgers terminated manager Chuck Dressen's contract; Dressen was demanding two more years. Walter Alston took his place and managed the Dodgers for the next 23 seasons (1954–1976), leading them to four World Series championships in 1955, 1959, 1963, and 1965 before being replaced by Tommy Lasorda, who would manage the team for 20 years himself (1976–1996). Lasorda would lead the Dodgers to a pair of World Series championships in 1981 and 1988.

== Composite box ==
1953 World Series (4–2): New York Yankees (A.L.) over Brooklyn Dodgers (N.L.)

Team	1	2	3	4	5	6	7	8	9	R	H	E
New York Yankees	8	1	5	0	4	0	5	7	3	33	56	1
Brooklyn Dodgers	3	1	0	3	3	7	2	5	3	27	64	7
Total attendance: 307,710 Average attendance: 51,285; Winning player's share: $8,281 Losing player's share: $6,178

== Broadcasting ==
The Series was broadcast on NBC television, with Yankees announcer Mel Allen and Dodgers announcer Vin Scully describing the action; and on Mutual radio, with Al Helfer and Gene Kelly announcing. For the first time, it was broadcast in the cities of Canada. It was also seen via film recordings on CMQ in Cuba.

Red Barber, Vin Scully's senior on the Dodgers' broadcast crew, was originally selected to work with Allen on NBC, but was removed from the Series due to a salary dispute with Gillette, which sponsored the broadcasts. Scully, at the age of 25, became the youngest man to broadcast a World Series game (a record that stands to this day).

== See also ==
- 1953 Japan Series
- Subway Series / Dodgers–Yankees rivalry
