= Hal Dixon (umpire) =

American baseball umpire (1920-1966)

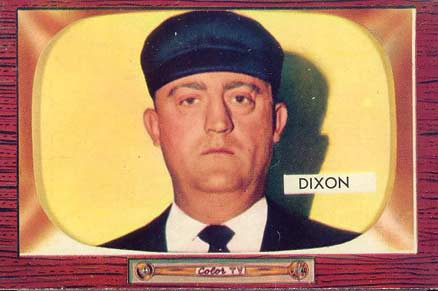
- Born: Hal Hayworth Dixon; July 7, 1920; Mount Vernon Springs, North Carolina, U.S.
- Died: July 28, 1966 (aged 46); Chesnee, South Carolina, U.S.
- Occupation: Umpire
- Years active: 1953-1959
- Employer: National League

Hal Hayworth Dixon (July 7, 1920 – July 28, 1966) was an American professional baseball umpire who worked in the National League from 1953 to 1959. He umpired in the 1959 World Series and the 1957 Major League Baseball All-Star Game.

== Umpiring career ==
Dixon umpired 989 major league games in his seven seasons.

In 1959, Dixon worked his only World Series. He spent all six games of the series working as the left field or right field umpire. He submitted his resignation after that season when a request for a salary increase was denied. He died from a heart attack on July 28, 1966, at age 46.
