= Joe Collins =

American baseball player (1922-1989)

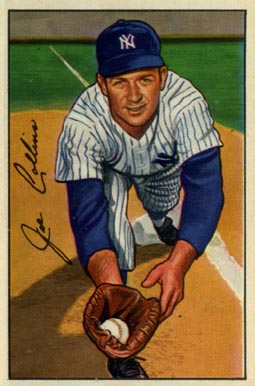
- First baseman
- Born: December 3, 1922; Scranton, Pennsylvania, U.S.
- Died: August 30, 1989 (aged 66); Union Township, Union County, New Jersey, U.S.
- Batted: Left Threw: Left

MLB debut
- September 25, 1948, for the New York Yankees

Last MLB appearance
- September 29, 1957, for the New York Yankees

MLB statistics
- Batting average: .256
- Home runs: 86
- Runs batted in: 329
- Stats at Baseball Reference

Teams
- New York Yankees (1948–1957)

Career highlights and awards
- 6× World Series champion (1949–1953, 1956)

Joseph Edward Collins (born Joseph Edward Kollonige; December 3, 1922 – August 30, 1989) was an American Major League Baseball player born in Scranton, Pennsylvania.

On September 25, 1948 he began his major league career playing for the New York Yankees. He played in 10 Major League seasons and seven World Series, all for the Yankees. At 6'0" tall and 185 pounds, he batted left and threw left, which made him unavailable to play most infield positions, where he was a first baseman in 715 games regular-season games. He also played 114 games as an outfielder, while his peak number of games played in a season was 130 in 1954. Collins often platooned with Moose Skowron. Collins hit 86 regular-season home runs, but more importantly, four in the World Series with powerful Yankee teams. He was a teammate of both Joe DiMaggio and Mickey Mantle.

His last Major League game was on September 29, 1957. His entire major league career was spent with the Yankees. He was traded to the Philadelphia Phillies at the start of the 1958 season, but he chose to retire rather than join the Phillies, thus cancelling the trade.

In 908 games over 10 seasons, Collins posted a .256 batting average (596-for-2329) with 404 runs, 79 doubles, 24 triples, 86 home runs, 329 RBI, 338 bases on balls, .350 on-base percentage and .421 slugging percentage. He finished his career with a .990 fielding percentage primarily as a first baseman but also played at all three outfield positions. In 36 postseason games, he made his hits count. He hit only .163 (15-for-92) with 15 runs, 3 doubles, 4 home runs, 10 RBI and 14 walks.

He died in Union Township, Union County, New Jersey in 1989, and there is a park there named in his honor. The park is located off of Liberty Avenue and also has a memorial plaque honoring him.

== See also ==
- List of Major League Baseball players who spent their entire career with one franchise
