= Gil McDougald =

American baseball player (1928–2010)

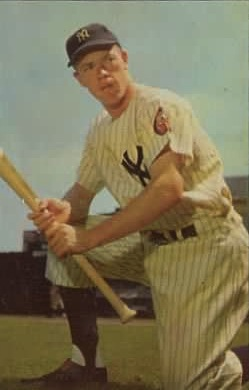
- McDougald in 1952
- Infielder
- Born: May 19, 1928; San Francisco, California, U.S.
- Died: November 28, 2010 (aged 82); Wall Township, New Jersey, U.S.
- Batted: Right Threw: Right

MLB debut
- April 20, 1951, for the New York Yankees

Last MLB appearance
- October 2, 1960, for the New York Yankees

MLB statistics
- Batting average: .276
- Home runs: 112
- Runs batted in: 576
- Stats at Baseball Reference

Teams
- New York Yankees (1951–1960)

Career highlights and awards
- 6× All-Star (1952, 1956–1959²); 5× World Series champion (1951–1953, 1956, 1958); AL Rookie of the Year (1951)

Gilbert James McDougald (May 19, 1928 – November 28, 2010) was an American Major League Baseball (MLB) infielder who played for the New York Yankees from 1951 through 1960.

McDougald was the 1951 American League (AL) Rookie of the Year. He was an All-Star for five seasons, and was a member of eight American League pennant-winning teams and five World Series champion teams. He was known for hitting a line drive that severely injured pitcher Herb Score's right eye during a game at Municipal Stadium in 1957.

== Early life ==
McDougald was born in San Francisco, the younger of two sons born to William James McDougald and his wife, the former Ella McGuire. He attended Commerce High School, where he was an All-City basketball player. He did not make the varsity baseball team until his senior year.

After graduation in 1946, he attended City College of San Francisco and the University of San Francisco. During this time, he played with the local Boston Braves feeder team, the Bayside Braves, where he adopted his unorthodox but effective batting stance.

== MLB career ==
The Yankees signed him to a contract in the spring of 1948. He played for various minor league teams before being promoted to the big leagues in 1951.

McDougald played his first major league game on April 20, 1951. On May 3 of that year, he tied a major league record, since broken, by batting in six runs in one inning. Later in the year, in the World Series, he became the first rookie to hit a grand slam home run in the Series. He narrowly beat out Minnie Miñoso in the voting for the 1951 American League Rookie of the Year. His entire major league career was spent on the New York Yankees. He was a versatile player, playing all the infield positions except first base: 599 games at second base, 508 games at third, and 284 at shortstop. He was an All-Star in 1952, 1956, 1957, 1958, and 1959, playing in four of the six games that were played (two All-Star games were held in 1959).

McDougald led all American League infielders in double plays at three different positions – at third base (1952), at second base (1955) and shortstop (1957). He was the double play leader at shortstop despite sharing time at the position with rookie Tony Kubek.

On May 7, 1957, McDougald, batting against Herb Score of the Cleveland Indians, hit a line drive that hit Score in the right eye. It caused Score to miss the rest of the 1957 and much of the 1958 season. While addressing reporters following the contest, McDougald said, "If Herb loses the sight in his eye, I'm going to quit the game." Score regained his vision and returned to pitching in the majors late in 1958. Only two years before, McDougald was struck in the left ear during batting practice by a ball hit by teammate Bob Cerv. Though initially believed to be a concussion (he missed only a few games), McDougald soon lost the hearing in his left ear and later also in his right. He retired in 1960 at only age 32, though not directly because of his hearing loss.

In 1958, McDougald was given the Lou Gehrig Memorial Award, which is awarded annually by the Phi Delta Theta fraternity (to which Gehrig belonged) at Columbia University.

His last appearance was in Game Seven of the 1960 World Series against the Pittsburgh Pirates; as a pinch runner in the top of the ninth, he scored on Yogi Berra's ground ball to tie the game at 9–9. The Pirates, however, won the Series on Bill Mazeroski's walk-off home run in the bottom of the ninth.

On December 9, 1960, McDougald announced his retirement. McDougald said he made up his mind to retire during the World Series and that his inclusion by the Yankees on a list of players eligible to be selected in the 1960 Expansion Draft had nothing to do with his decision.

While with the Yankees, McDougald was a resident of Tenafly, New Jersey.

In 1336 games over 10 seasons, McDougald posted a .276 batting average (1291-for-4676) with 697 runs, 187 doubles, 51 triples, 112 home runs, 576 RBI, 45 stolen bases, 559 bases on balls, .356 on-base percentage and .410 slugging percentage. Defensively, he recorded a .975 fielding percentage playing at second and third base and shortstop. In 53 World Series games, he batted .237 (45-for-190) with 23 runs, 4 doubles, 1 triple, 7 home runs, 24 RBI, 2 stolen bases and 20 walks.

== Personal life ==
McDougald was the head baseball coach at Fordham University from 1970 to 1976. He resigned this position due to his worsening hearing loss, a result of being hit in the head by a line drive during batting practice in 1955.

His hearing was somewhat restored by a cochlear implant he received during surgery at the New York University Medical Center in 1994. McDougald later became a paid spokesperson for the implant manufacturer, Cochlear Americas. He also became a speaker at benefits for hearing organizations, and testified before Congress.

McDougald died of prostate cancer at his home in Wall Township, New Jersey, at the age of 82. He was survived by his wife of 62 years, the former Lucille Tochilin (1928–2014); seven children, and 14 grandchildren.

== See also ==
- List of Major League Baseball annual triples leaders
- List of Major League Baseball players who spent their entire career with one franchise
