= Bill Skowron =

American baseball player (1930–2012)

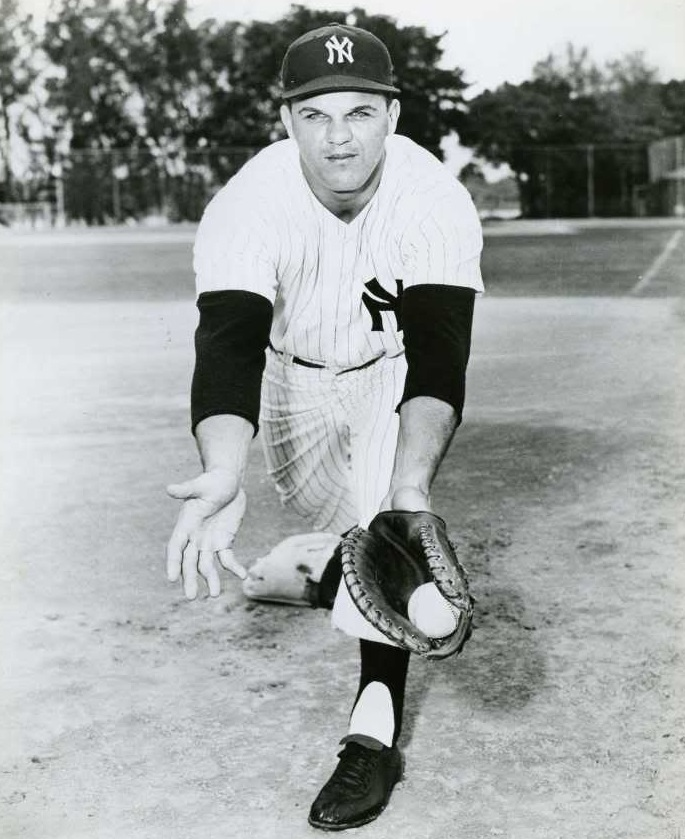
- First baseman
- Born: December 18, 1930; Chicago, Illinois, U.S.
- Died: April 27, 2012 (aged 81); Arlington Heights, Illinois, U.S.
- Batted: Right Threw: Right

MLB debut
- April 13, 1954, for the New York Yankees

Last MLB appearance
- October 1, 1967, for the California Angels

MLB statistics
- Batting average: .282
- Home runs: 211
- Runs batted in: 888
- Stats at Baseball Reference

Teams
- New York Yankees (1954–1962); Los Angeles Dodgers (1963); Washington Senators (1964); Chicago White Sox (1964–1967); California Angels (1967)

Career highlights and awards
- 8× All-Star (1957–1960², 1961², 1965); 5× World Series champion (1956, 1958, 1961–1963)

William Joseph Skowron (December 18, 1930 – April 27, 2012), nicknamed "Moose", was an American professional baseball first baseman. He played 14 seasons in Major League Baseball (MLB) from 1954 to 1967 for the New York Yankees, Los Angeles Dodgers, Washington Senators, Chicago White Sox, and California Angels. He was an eight-time All-Star and a five-time World Series champion.

Skowron had been a community relations representative for the Chicago White Sox for several years when he died in 2012.

== Early life ==
Skowron was born in Chicago, Illinois, and was of Polish descent. His father was a city garbage collector. One day his grandfather gave the seven-year-old Skowron a haircut resembling that of Italian dictator, Benito Mussolini. His friends jokingly calling him "Mussolini", which his family shortened to "Moose." The name stuck throughout his career.

Skowron attended Weber High School in Chicago, then went to Purdue University in Indiana, where he was a member of Tau Kappa Epsilon fraternity. Though Skowron went to the school on a football scholarship, he found himself better suited to baseball, hitting .500 as a sophomore in 1950, a record in the Big Ten Conference that lasted ten years.

== Professional baseball career ==
Following his sophomore year at Purdue, Skowron was signed to play baseball for the Austin (MN) Packers in the Southern Minny League (Class AA-level town-team baseball). He hit .343 for the Packers in 23 games. He also displayed his power with a three home run game against the Rochester Royals. He did so well in Austin that the Yankees made a contract offer.

=== Major leagues ===
Skowron signed with the New York Yankees in September 1950 as an amateur free agent by Yankees scout Lou Maguolo. He played his first game for the Yankees on April 13, 1954. In the beginning, he was platooned at first base with Joe Collins, but from 1958 on he became the Yankees' full-time first baseman. He played in seven American League (AL) All-Star games as a Yankee: 1957, 1958, twice in 1959, twice in 1960, and 1961 (two All-Star Games were played in 1959 through 1962).

After batting .270 with 23 home runs and with Joe Pepitone ready to succeed him as the starting first baseman, Skowron was traded from the Yankees to the Los Angeles Dodgers for Stan Williams at the Winter Meetings on November 26, 1962. Although he floundered against National League pitching the next season, batting just .203 in 237 at bats with four homers, he stunned his former team in the 1963 World Series, leading the Dodgers with a .385 average and a home run, as Los Angeles swept New York in four straight games. As a result, Skowron become one of few players in MLB history to have won back-to-back Series championships with different teams.

On December 6, 1963, he returned to the AL when he was purchased from the Dodgers by the Washington Senators. On July 13, 1964, he was traded by the Senators to the Chicago White Sox. In 1965, he played in his eighth All-Star Game. On May 6, 1967, he was traded by the White Sox to the California Angels. He was released by the Angels on October 9, 1967.

He played in a total of 1,478 major-league games, all but 15 as a first baseman. (He was in 13 games as a third baseman, and two as a second baseman.)

Skowron made the last out of the 1957 World Series, but the following year he knocked in the winning run in game six of the 1958 World Series. Skowron also hit a three-run home run in game seven to propel the Yankees to a World Series win, and a comeback from a 3-1 series deficit. He also scored the only run in game seven of the 1962 World Series against the San Francisco Giants, on a double play grounder by Tony Kubek.

In total, Skowron played on eight World Series teams and was on the winning side five times, having won four of seven times with New York (1956, 1958, 1961 and 1962) while winning one with the Dodgers (1963).

Skowron was a consistently good hitter throughout most of his career, and more than held his own in World Series play, batting .293, with 8 home runs, 29 RBIs, and a .519 slugging percentage in eight World Series. He hit a home run for Game 7 of a World Series on three different occasions. He is the only player in MLB history to hit a home run in three different Game 7s and he shares the record with teammate Yogi Berra for the most home runs hit for a career in Game 7 of a World Series.

Skowron was once a playful target of his friend, Yankee pitcher Fritz Peterson. A known practical joker, Peterson was reportedly popular with his teammates, entertaining them with his elaborate jokes. He once used a fake Baseball Hall of Fame letterhead to ask Skowron to donate his pacemaker after he died.

== Personal life ==
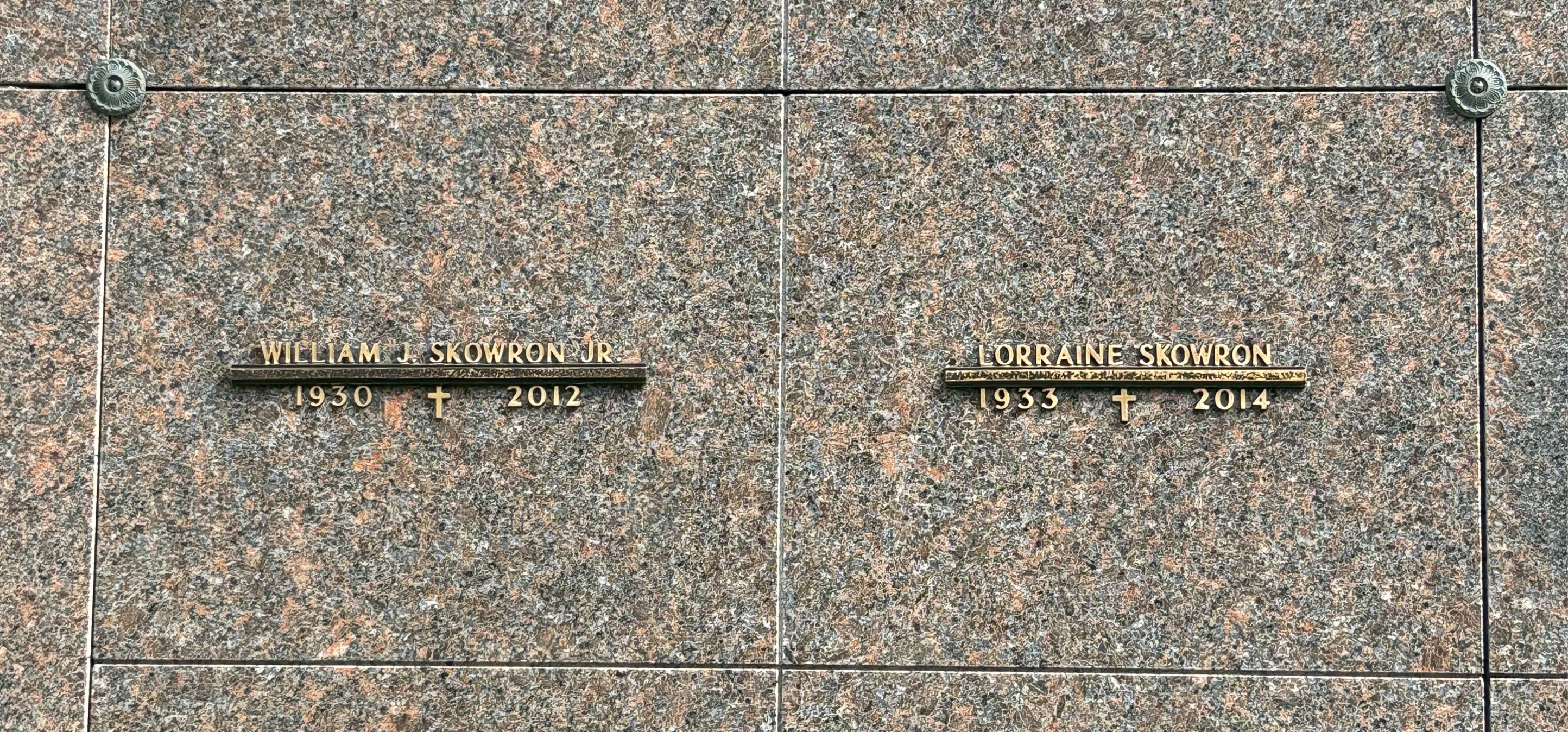
Skowron's grave at Maryhill Catholic Cemetery

Skowron met and married Virginia Hulquist while he was playing for the Austin, MN Packers. During his time with the Yankees, he resided in Hillsdale, New Jersey. In 1963, he appeared as himself in the Mister Ed episode "Leo Durocher Meets Mister Ed".

He was inducted into the National Polish-American Hall of Fame in 1980 while living in Schaumburg, Illinois. In 1999, he became a community relations representative for the Chicago White Sox, holding the job through his passing in 2012.

Skowron died at age 81 on April 27, 2012, in Arlington Heights, Illinois, of congestive heart failure, while suffering from lung cancer. He was interred at Maryhill Catholic Cemetery in Niles.
