= 1928 in baseball =

The following are the baseball events of the year 1928 throughout the world.

== Champions ==
- World Series: New York Yankees over St. Louis Cardinals (4–0)
- NNL Championship Series: St. Louis Stars over Chicago American Giants (5–4)

== Awards and honors ==
- League Award
  - Mickey Cochrane, Philadelphia Athletics, C
  - Jim Bottomley, St. Louis Cardinals, 1B

== Statistical leaders ==
| | American League | | National League | | Eastern Colored League† | | Negro National League | |
| Stat | Player | Total | Player | Total | Player | Total | Player | Total |
|---|---|---|---|---|---|---|---|---|
| AVG | Goose Goslin (WSH) | .379 | Rogers Hornsby (BSN) | .387 | Jud Wilson (BBS) | .399 | Mule Suttles (SLS) | .359 |
| HR | Babe Ruth (NYY) | 54 | Jim Bottomley (STL); Hack Wilson (CHC) | 31 | Rap Dixon (BBS) | 13 | Turkey Stearnes (DTS) | 24 |
| RBI | Lou Gehrig (NYY) | 147 | Jim Bottomley (STL) | 136 | Rap Dixon (BBS) | 58 | Wilson Redus (SLS) | 82 |
| W | Lefty Grove (PHA); George Pipgras (NYY) | 24 | Larry Benton (NYG); Burleigh Grimes (PIT) | 25 | Laymon Yokely (BBS) | 12 | Ted Trent (SLS) | 19 |
| ERA | Garland Braxton (WSH) | 2.51 | Dazzy Vance (BRO) | 2.09 | Jimmy Shields (BG) | 1.51 | Willie Powell (CAG) | 2.00 |
| K | Lefty Grove (PHA) | 183 | Dazzy Vance (BRO) | 200 | Laymon Yokely (BBS) | 103 | Satchel Paige (BBB) | 121 |

†Eastern Colored League disbanded mid-season, though teams continued playing.

== Major league baseball final standings ==
=== American League final standings ===
American League
| Team | W | L | Pct. | GB | Home | Road |
|---|---|---|---|---|---|---|
| New York Yankees | 101 | 53 | .656 | — | 52‍–‍25 | 49‍–‍28 |
| Philadelphia Athletics | 98 | 55 | .641 | 2½ | 52‍–‍25 | 46‍–‍30 |
| St. Louis Browns | 82 | 72 | .532 | 19 | 43‍–‍34 | 39‍–‍38 |
| Washington Senators | 75 | 79 | .487 | 26 | 37‍–‍43 | 38‍–‍36 |
| Chicago White Sox | 72 | 82 | .468 | 29 | 37‍–‍40 | 35‍–‍42 |
| Detroit Tigers | 68 | 86 | .442 | 33 | 36‍–‍41 | 32‍–‍45 |
| Cleveland Indians | 62 | 92 | .403 | 39 | 28‍–‍49 | 34‍–‍43 |
| Boston Red Sox | 57 | 96 | .373 | 43½ | 26‍–‍47 | 31‍–‍49 |

Locations of teams for the 1923–1931 American League seasons
American League

=== National League final standings ===
National League
| Team | W | L | Pct. | GB | Home | Road |
|---|---|---|---|---|---|---|
| St. Louis Cardinals | 95 | 59 | .617 | — | 42‍–‍35 | 53‍–‍24 |
| New York Giants | 93 | 61 | .604 | 2 | 51‍–‍26 | 42‍–‍35 |
| Chicago Cubs | 91 | 63 | .591 | 4 | 52‍–‍25 | 39‍–‍38 |
| Pittsburgh Pirates | 85 | 67 | .559 | 9 | 47‍–‍30 | 38‍–‍37 |
| Cincinnati Reds | 78 | 74 | .513 | 16 | 44‍–‍33 | 34‍–‍41 |
| Brooklyn Robins | 77 | 76 | .503 | 17½ | 41‍–‍35 | 36‍–‍41 |
| Boston Braves | 50 | 103 | .327 | 44½ | 25‍–‍51 | 25‍–‍52 |
| Philadelphia Phillies | 43 | 109 | .283 | 51 | 26‍–‍49 | 17‍–‍60 |

Locations of teams for the 1920–1931 National League seasons
National League

== Negro leagues final standings ==
All Negro leagues standings below are per MLB and Seamheads.

=== Eastern Colored League final standings ===
The League broke up midway through the season due to the breakdown of the founder (and manager of Hilldale Club) although the individual teams continued to play.

| vs. Eastern Colored League | | | | | vs. Major Black teams | | | |
| Eastern Colored League | W | L | Pct. | GB | W | L | T | Pct. |
|---|---|---|---|---|---|---|---|---|
| New York Lincoln Giants | 5 | 2 | .714 | — | 21 | 17 | 2 | .550 |
| Baltimore Black Sox | 5 | 2 | .714 | — | 29 | 29 | 3 | .500 |
| Philadelphia Tigers | 2 | 3 | .400 | 2 | 2 | 7 | 0 | .222 |
| Cuban Stars (East) | 2 | 4 | .333 | 2½ | 9 | 18 | 3 | .350 |
| Atlantic City Bacharach Giants | 2 | 5 | .286 | 3 | 30 | 31 | 2 | .492 |

Locations of teams for the 1928 Eastern Colored League season
Eastern Colored League

=== Negro National League final standings ===
This was the fourth season in which a playoff was held to determine the pennant, for which the first half leader would be matched against the second half winner. St. Louis won the first half while Chicago won the second half. As such, they met for a best-of-nine Championship Series. St. Louis would win the series in nine games to win their first pennant.

| vs. Negro National League | | | | | vs. Major Black teams | | | |
| Negro National League | W | L | Pct. | GB | W | L | T | Pct. |
|---|---|---|---|---|---|---|---|---|
| ^{(1)} St. Louis Stars | 61 | 25 | .709 | — | 69 | 26 | 0 | .726 |
| Kansas City Monarchs | 48 | 28 | .632 | 8 | 51 | 29 | 1 | .636 |
| ^{(2)} Chicago American Giants | 52 | 32 | .619 | 8 | 59 | 41 | 1 | .589 |
| Detroit Stars | 53 | 36 | .596 | 9½ | 56 | 40 | 0 | .583 |
| Birmingham Black Barons | 45 | 54 | .455 | 22½ | 47 | 55 | 0 | .461 |
| Memphis Red Sox | 33 | 51 | .393 | 27 | 33 | 51 | 0 | .393 |
| Cleveland Tigers | 20 | 59 | .253 | 37½ | 20 | 60 | 0 | .250 |
| Cuban Stars (West) | 13 | 41 | .241 | 32 | 13 | 41 | 0 | .241 |

^{(1)} First half champion ^{(2)} Second half champion

Locations of teams for the 1928 Negro National League season
Negro National League
Traveling team: Cuban Stars (West)

=== Independent teams final standings ===
A loose confederation of teams existed that were not part of either established leagues.

vs. All Teams
| Eastern Independent Clubs | W | L | T | Pct. | GB |
|---|---|---|---|---|---|
| Hilldale Club | 35 | 28 | 1 | .555 | — |
| Homestead Grays | 11 | 9 | 0 | .550 | 2½ |
| Eastern League Stars | 1 | 1 | 0 | .500 | 3½ |
| Brooklyn Royal Giants | 4 | 6 | 0 | .400 | 4½ |
| Colored All Stars | 1 | 2 | 1 | .375 | 4 |

== Events ==
- January 10 – The New York Giants trade Rogers Hornsby to the Boston Braves for Shanty Hogan and Jimmy Welsh.
- April 1 – Kansas City (American Association) purchases Joe Cronin's contract from the Pittsburgh Pirates.
- April 10 – In the season opener, the Boston Red Sox defeat the Washington Senators, 7–5.
- April 13 – The contest between the Cleveland Indians and Chicago White Sox is called a 1–1 tie after six innings.
- May 19 – With a 3–2 victory over the Boston Braves, the Chicago Cubs complete a thirteen-game winning streak.
- June 16 – At Comiskey Park, Boston Red Sox second baseman Bill Regan hits two home runs in the fourth inning during a 10–5 victory over the Chicago White Sox. Regan matches his last year's total in the inning. His first homer is off loser Ted Blankenship, and the second is an inside-the-park-off Sarge Connally. Ellis Burks will be the second player in Red Sox history to hit a pair of homers in an inning, on August 27, 1990. Rookie Ed Morris is the winning pitcher.
- July 26
  - Hall of Famer Carl Hubbell gives up five runs (three earned) and seven hits, and takes the loss in his first major league start.
  - Bob Meusel of the New York Yankees hit for the cycle for the third time in his career. The Yankees scored 11 runs in the top of the 12th inning to beat the Detroit Tigers, 12–1.
- July 30 – The Philadelphia Phillies defeat the St. Louis Cardinals 8–7 in sixteen innings. Hall of famer Chuck Klein makes his major league debut.
- August 6 – For the second time in four days, the New York Yankees lose a fifteen inning game.
- August 15 – Hall of Fame catcher Bill Dickey makes his major league debut in the Yankees' 8–4 loss to the Chicago White Sox.
- September 9 – With first place in the American League on the line, the New York Yankees sweep a double header from the Philadelphia Athletics.
- September 24 – A Monday afternoon crowd of only 404 watches the Detroit Tigers blank the last place Boston Red Sox 8–0. The meager number of fans at Navin Field is the lowest attendance in American League history at Detroit.
- September 25 – The Philadelphia Phillies snap a twelve-game losing streak with a 5–2 victory over the Chicago Cubs. It is Philadelphia's second twelve-game losing streak of the season (July 7 to July 20).
- October 4 – A seventh-inning solo home run by Jim Bottomley is one of only three hits for the St. Louis Cardinals as the New York Yankees take game one of the 1928 World Series, 4–1.
- October 5 – Lou Gehrig has five RBIs, including a first-inning three-run home run to lead the New York Yankees to a 9–3 victory in game two of the World Series.
- October 7 – Lou Gehrig hits two home runs, including an inside-the-park home run in the fourth in the Yankees' 7–3 victory in game three of the World Series.
- October 9 – The New York Yankees defeat the St. Louis Cardinals, 7–3, in Game four of the World Series to win their third World Championship title. Babe Ruth hits three home runs in Game four. This is the second time in three years Ruth hits three home runs in a Series game.
- November 7 – The Boston Braves send Rogers Hornsby to the Chicago Cubs for Bruce Cunningham, Percy Jones, Lou Legett, Freddie Maguire, Socks Seibold and $200,000.
- December 1 – National League President John Heydler becomes the first person to propose a baseball rule change calling for a 10th man, or a designated hitter, to bat in place of the pitcher. The NL will vote in favor of the proposal, but the American League will turn it down.
- December 2 – St. Louis Cardinals first baseman Jim Bottomley, who hit 325 with 31 home runs and 126 RBI, is elected National League Most Valuable Player with 76 points for 70 of Freddie Lindstrom, whose .358 batting average was third behind Rogers Hornsby (.387) and Paul Waner (.370).
- December 19 – The Washington Senators trade Hall of fame second baseman Bucky Harris to the Detroit Tigers for Jack Warner.

== Births ==
=== January ===
- January 5:
  - Dorothy Naum
  - Bob Oldis
- January 6 – Dan Lewandowski
- January 10 – Jack Dittmer
- January 11:
  - Loren Babe
  - Carl Powis
- January 23 – Chico Carrasquel
- January 28 – Pete Runnels
- January 29 – Jim Robertson
- January 31 – Rhoda Leonard

=== February ===
- February 5 – Don Hoak
- February 6 – Charlie Gorin
- February 7:
  - Joe Lonnett
  - Felipe Montemayor
  - Al Smith
- February 9 – Erv Palica
- February 11 – Chris Kitsos
- February 20 – Roy Face
- February 24 – Bubba Phillips
- February 27 – Juan Delis
- February 28 – Dick Kokos
- February 28 – Therese McKinley

=== March ===
- March 1 – Bert Hamric
- March 13 – Bob Greenwood
- March 14 – Earl Smith
- March 15:
  - Paul Carey
  - Nellie King
- March 18 – Chi-Chi Olivo
- March 20 – Jake Crawford
- March 22 – Paul Schramka
- March 23:
  - Charlene Barnett
  - Jim Lemon

=== April ===
- April 4 – Frank Smith
- April 10 – Frankie Pack
- April 12 – Bill Stewart
- April 14 – Herb Adams
- April 28 – Rinty Monahan

=== May ===
- May 9 – Jean Smith
- May 11:
  - Vern Rapp
  - Mel Wright
- May 13 – Bob Smith
- May 15 – Betty Warfel
- May 16 – Billy Martin
- May 19 – Gil McDougald
- May 21 – Elmer Sexauer
- May 24 – Donna Cook
- May 29 – Willard Schmidt

=== June ===
- June 3 – Dick Young
- June 4 – Billy Hunter
- June 6 – Bob Talbot
- June 7 – Marilyn Olinger
- June 8:
  - Aldine Calacurcio
  - Webbo Clarke
  - Alex Konikowski
- June 10 – Ken Lehman
- June 12 – Jack Cusick
- June 14 – Herb Plews
- June 17 – Willard Nixon
- June 20:
  - Bob Mahoney
  - Art Schult
- June 23 – Jean Cione
- June 25 – Gloria Ruiz
- June 29:
  - Nick Testa
  - Gene Verble
- June 30 – Pompeyo Davalillo

=== July ===
- July 1 – Hersh Freeman
- July 4:
  - Babe Birrer
  - Chuck Tanner
- July 5:
  - Jim Baxes
  - Lorraine Fisher
  - Georgette Vincent
- July 10 – John Glenn
- July 13 – Daryl Spencer
- July 15 – Julián Ladera
- July 18 – Billy Harrell
- July 22 – Stu Locklin
- July 23 – José Bracho
- July 27 – Charlie Bicknell
- July 29 – Ken Landenberger
- July 30:
  - Bill Hall
  - Joe Nuxhall

=== August ===
- August 3:
  - Dick Hyde
  - Cliff Ross
- August 6 – Herb Moford
- August 8:
  - Vern Morgan
  - Jane Stoll
- August 11 – Bob Stephenson
- August 12 – Bob Buhl
- August 18 – Marge Schott
- August 19 – Jim Finigan
- August 24 – Hal Griggs
- August 25:
  - Darrell Johnson
  - Floyd Wooldridge
- August 28 – Betty Wanless
- August 30 – Doris Neal
- August 31 – Buzz Dozier

=== September ===
- September 4 – José Santiago
- September 10 – Bob Garber
- September 12 – Len Matarazzo
- September 15 – Bob Lennon
- September 16 – Vito Valentinetti
- September 17 – Ed Vargo
- September 23 – Corinne Clark
- September 26 – Al Lary
- September 27:
  - Perry Currin
  - Thornton Kipper
- September 28 – Dick Gernert

=== October ===
- October 1 – Hal Naragon
- October 2 – Angel Scull
- October 3 – Dave Melton
- October 4 – Rip Repulski
- October 6 – Fred Marolewski
- October 7 – Joe Presko
- October 13 – Walter Lee Gibbons
- October 15:
  - Jim Command
  - Gail Henley
- October 16 – Len Yochim
- October 17 – Jim Gilliam
- October 20 – Mickey Micelotta
- October 21 – Whitey Ford
- October 24 – George Bullard
- October 27 – Alice Hoover
- October 31 – Janet Jacobs

=== November ===
- November 2:
  - Shirley Kleinhans
  - Bob Ross
- November 4:
  - Jay Van Noy
  - Edna Scheer
- November 6 – Bill Wilson
- November 13 – Steve Bilko
- November 15:
  - Gus Bell
  - Normie Roy
- November 16 – Jacqueline Mattson
- November 18 – Lou Lombardo
- November 25 – Ray Narleski
- November 28 – Billy Queen
- November 29 – Bill Currie

=== December ===
- December 5:
  - Mary Dailey
  - Jack Urban
- December 9:
  - Joe DeMaestri
  - Billy Klaus
- December 11 – Harry Warner
- December 13 – Joe Landrum
- December 15 – Clyde McNeal
- December 16 – Doug Hansen
- December 17 – Dolores Wilson
- December 25:
  - Frank Baldwin
  - Mike Blyzka

== Daths ==
=== January ===
- January 2:
  - James D. Burns, 62, founding owner of the Detroit Tigers from their entry into the American League in 1901 through the 1902 season.
  - Hunkey Hines, 60, right fielder in two games for the 1895 Brooklyn Grooms of the National League.
- January 14 – Al Reach, 87, Anglo-American sportsman who as second baseman became the first professional player in 1865; batted .353 for 1871 champion Athletics in first season of National Association; co-founder of the Phillies, serving as team president from 1883 to 1902, later part owner of Athletics; publisher of annual baseball guides beginning in 1883, and also was responsible for the invention of the cork-center baseball.
- January 16 – Claude Rossman, 46, American League first baseman/right fielder who played with the Cleveland Naps, Detroit Tigers and St. Louis Browns in parts of five seasons spanning 1904–09.
- January 28 – Jake Thielman, 48, pitcher for the St. Louis Browns, Cleveland Naps and Boston Red Sox of the American League between 1905 and 1908.
- January 30 – Jim Foran, 80, first baseman for the 1871 Fort Wayne Kekiongas of the National Association.

=== February ===
- February [?] – Pablo Mesa, 30, Negro league outfielder/pitcher for the Cuban Stars (East) from 1921 through 1927.
- February 1 – Hughie Jennings, 58, Hall of Fame shortstop, most notably for the Baltimore Orioles of the National League, who batted .311 lifetime but had career shortened by numerous beanings, who as team captain was runner-up in 1896 batting race with .401 mark, managed the Detroit Tigers to consecutive pennants from 1907 to 1909, and later coached for the New York Giants.
- February 4 – Bill McCarthy, 41, backup catcher for the 1905 Boston Beaneaters and 1907 Cincinnati Reds of the National League.
- February 9 – Bill Farmer, 63, Irish catcher/outfielder for the NL Pittsburgh Alleghenys and the AA Philadelphia Athletics in 1888.
- February 13 – Pete Daniels, 63, pitcher for the 1890 Pittsburgh Alleghenys and 1898 St. Louis Browns of the National League.
- February 23 – Jack Ridgway, 39, pitcher for the 1914 Baltimore Terrapins of the Federal League.
- February 27 – Walt Schulz, 27, pitcher for the 1920 St. Louis Cardinals of the National League.

=== March ===
- March 5 – Mart McQuaid, 66, backup second baseman/outfielder for the 1891 St. Louis Browns of the American Association and the 1898 Washington Senators of the National League.
- March 13 – Bobby Wheelock, 63, shortstop/outfielder for the NL Boston Beaneaters and the AA Columbus Solons in parts of three seasons spanning 1887–91.
- March 14 – Nat Hudson, 69, pitcher for the St. Louis Browns of the American Association from 1886 through 1889, who helped his team win the 1886 World Series over the National League's Chicago White Stockings, and posted a 25–10 record with a 2.54 ERA and a top-league .714 winning percentage in 1888.
- March 19 – Tom Lovett, 64, pitcher for six seasons between 1885 and 1894, mainly with the NL Brooklyn Bridegrooms, who collected 30 wins in 1890 and hurled a no-hitter against the New York Giants in 1891.
- March 23 – Jake Kafora, 39, backup catcher for the NL Pittsburgh Pirates from 1913 to 1914.
- March 25 – Homer Smoot, 50, center fielder who batted a .290 average in 680 games with the St. Louis Cardinals and Cincinnati Reds from 1902 to 1906, and led all National League outfielders with 284 putouts in 1902.

=== April ===
- April 1 – Marr Phillips, 70, shortstop who played in parts of three seasons spanning 1884–90 with the Indianapolis Hoosiers, Pittsburgh Alleghenys and Rochester Broncos of the American Association, and for the Detroit Wolverines of the National League.
- April 6 – Ike McAuley, 36, National League shortstop for the Pittsburgh Pirates (1914–16), St. Louis Cardinals (1917) and Chicago Cubs (1925).
- April 19 – Harry McCaffery, 69, outfield/infield utility for the St. Louis Brown Stockings/Browns and Louisville Eclipse of the American Association from 1882 to 1883.
- April 23 – Joe Miller, 67, shortstop for the 1884 Toledo Blue Stockings and the 1885 Louisville Colonels of the American Association.
- April 24 – Harry Berthrong, 84, infield/outfield utility and catcher in 17 games with the 1871 Washington Olympics of the National Association.
- April 26 – Zeke Wilson, 58, pitcher from 1895 through 1899 for the Boston Beaneaters, Cleveland Spiders and St. Louis Perfectos of the National League.

=== May ===
- May 1 – Bull Smith, 47, outfielder for the Pittsburgh Pirates, Chicago Cubs and Washington Senators between the 1904 and 1911 seasons.
- May 6 – Sam Wright, 79, younger brother of Hall of Famers Harry and George Wright, who played at shortstop for the New Haven Elm Citys, Boston Red Stockings and Cincinnati Reds in parts of four seasons spanning 1875–81.
- May 10 – Ed Stein, 58, pitcher who played from 1890 through 1898 for the Chicago Colts and Brooklyn Grooms/Bridegrooms of the National League.
- May 24 – Billy Smith, 67, pitcher for the 1886 Detroit Wolverines of the National League.
- May 25 – Max Fiske, 39, pitcher for the 1914 Chicago Chi-Feds of the outlaw Federal League.
- May 31 – Grant Briggs, 63, part-time catcher/outfielder in 110 games with the Syracuse Stars, Louisville Colonels and St. Louis Browns between 1890 and 1895.

=== June ===
- June 1 – Charlie Jordan, 56, pitcher for the 1896 Philadelphia Phillies of the National League.
- June 12 – Frank Wilson, 41, National League umpire who officiated in 996 games between April 13, 1921 and June 3, 1928; led NL arbiters in ejections in 1921–1922; died following appendicitis surgery nine days after working his last MLB game.
- June 13 – Chuck Corgan, 25, backup middle infielder for the National League Brooklyn Robins in the 1925 and 1927 seasons.
- June 14 – Con Daily, 63, catcher who also played all infield and outfield positions for seven teams in two different leagues, mainly for the Brooklyn Grooms of the National League, in a 12-year career that spanned from 1895 to 1996.
- June 19 – Jake Weimer, 54, National League pitcher who posted a 97–69 record from 1903 to 1909 for the Cubs, Reds and New York Giants, including three 20-win seasons and a 2.23 career ERA in 143 complete games.
- June 23 – Malachi Kittridge, 58, catcher for the Louisville Colonels, Boston Beaneaters, Washington Senators and Cleveland Naps between 1890 and 1906.
- June 24 – Frank Cox, 70, shortstop in 26 games with the 1884 Detroit Wolverines of the National League.

=== July ===
- July 2 – Pete Hotaling, 71, center fielder for six different teams in two leagues, primarily for the Cleveland Blues of the National League, during parts of nine seasons spanning 1879–88.
- July 15 – Al Sauter, 59, third baseman for the 1890 for the Philadelphia Athletics of the American Association.
- July 18 – Ed Killian, 51, pitcher who posted a 103–78 record and a 2.38 ERA in 214 games from 1903 to 1910, collecting two 20-win seasons, allowing nine home runs in 1600 career innings (none from 1903 to 1907), while clinching the 1907 American League pennant for the Detroit Tigers with two wins in a doubleheader.
- July 30 – Charlie Becker, 37, pitcher from 1911 to 1912 for the Washington Senators of the American League.

=== August ===
- August 21 – Joe Mulvey, 69, third baseman who played from 1883 to 1895 for seven teams in three different league, including four Philadelphia franchises, collecting 1059 hits in 4063 at-bats for a .261 average in 987 games.
- August 25 – Snake Wiltse, 56, pitcher/first baseman/outfielder for the Pittsburgh Pirates, Philadelphia Athletics, Baltimore Orioles and New York Highlanders from 1901 through 1903, who posted a 29–31 record and a 4.59 ERA in 68 games pitched, while batting a .278 average with a .398 of slugging in 86 games.

=== September ===
- September 9 – Urban Shocker, 38, American League pitcher who posted a 187–117 record and a 3.17 ERA in 187 games with the St. Louis Browns and New York Yankees from 1916 to 1928, leading the league in wins (27) in 1921 and for the most strikeouts (149) in 1922, ending his career with four 20-win seasons and a 1.50 SO/BB ratio in 2681 innings.

=== October ===
- October 10 – Justus Thorner, 80, owner of three different teams in Cincinnati, including the Cincinnati Red Stockings of 1882 and 1883, the inaugural seasons of the franchise now known as the Cincinnati Reds.
- October 11 – Frank Smith, 70, Canadian catcher for the 1884 Pittsburgh Alleghenys of the National League.
- October 14:
  - Billy Milligan, 60, pitcher for the 1901 Philadelphia Athletics (AL) and the 1904 New York Giants (baseball).
  - Bill Stuart, 55, middle infielder who played in part of two seasons for the Pittsburgh Pirates (1895) and New York Giants (1899) of the National League.
- October 15 – Pony Sager, 80, shortstop/left fielder in eight games for the 1871 Rockford Forest Citys of the National Association.
- October 22 – Jack Dunn, 56, major league pitcher/third baseman for five teams from 1897 to 1904, who became owner and manager of minor league Baltimore Orioles in 1907, where he developed stars as Babe Ruth and Lefty Grove, while winning seven consecutive pennants from 1919 through 1925, ending his career as the second winningest manager in minor league history.
- October 27 – Billy West, 75, National League second baseman who played for the 1874 Brooklyn Atlantics and the 1876 New York Mutuals.
- October 31 – José Méndez, 41, generally regarded as one of the greatest players in Cuban baseball history, who was a star pitcher in the Negro leagues, primarily with the All Nations team and the Kansas City Monarchs, while managing the Monarchs from 1920 to 1926, leading them to the first ever Negro World Series title in 1924.

=== November ===
- November 4 – Ed Kelly, 39, relief pitcher for the 1914 Boston Red Sox of the American League.
- November 5 – George Treadway, 61, National League outfielder from 1893 through 1896 for the Baltimore Orioles, Brooklyn Grooms and Louisville Colonels, who posted a .285 average and a .432 of slugging in 328 career games.
- November 6 – Bill Cooney, 45, relief pitcher from 1909 to 1910 for the Boston Doves of the National League.
- November 11 – Oyster Burns, 64, right fielder for five teams between 1884 and 1895, primarily for the Brooklyn Bridegrooms, who led the National League in home runs (13) and RBI (128) in the 1887 season, while ending with a .300 batting average and a .445 slugging in 1188 career games.
- November 14 – Herb Juul, 42, pitcher in one game for the 1911 Cincinnati Reds.
- November 15:
  - Charlie Dorman, 30, backup catcher for the Chicago White Sox during the 1923 season.
  - Horace Fogel, 67, owner and president of the Philadelphia Phillies from 1909 to 1912.
- November 18 – Jim Gilmore, 75, catcher for the 1875 Washington Nationals of the National League.
- November 21 – Pete Lohman, 64, catcher for the 1891 Washington Statesmen of the American Association.
- November 26:
  - Denny Clare, 75, middle infielder for the 1872 Brooklyn Atlantics of the National Association.
  - Butts Wagner, 57, the older brother of Honus Wagner, who played at third base and outfield for the Washington Senators and the Brooklyn Bridegrooms during the 1898 season.

=== December ===
- December 2 – Bill Hugues, 68, first baseman/outfielder and pitcher who played for the 1884 Washington Nationals of the Union Association and the 1885 Philadelphia Athletics of the American Association.
- December 22 – Hugh Reid, 76, right fielder in one game for the 1874 Baltimore Canaries of the National Association.
- December 27 – George Meister, 74, third baseman for the 1884 Toledo Blue Stockings of the American Association.
- December 29 – Mort Scanlan, 67, first baseman for the 1890 New York Giants of the National League.
