= List of Cincinnati Reds owners and executives =

This page is a list of the owners and executives of the Cincinnati Reds.

The Cincinnati Reds are an American professional baseball team based in Cincinnati, Ohio. The Reds compete in Major League Baseball (MLB) as a member club of the National League (NL) Central division. They were a charter member of the American Association in 1882 and joined the NL in 1890.

== Owners ==
Year(s)	Owner
1882–1883	Justus Thorner
1884	Aaron S. Stern
1885	George Herancourt
1886	John Hauck
1887–1890	Aaron S. Stern
1890–1891 †	Al Johnson
1891–1902	John T. Brush
1902–1927	Garry Herrmann
1928–1929	C. J. McDiarmid
1930–1933	Sidney Weil
1933-1934 ††	Central Trust Bank
1934–1961	Powel Crosley Jr.
1961–1966	Bill DeWitt
1967–1973	Francis L. Dale
1973–1980	Louis Nippert
1980–1984	William Williams & James Williams
1984–1999	Marge Schott
1999–2005	Carl Lindner Jr.
2006–present	Bob Castellini

† Johnson owned the team briefly during the 1890-91 offseason before selling the club to John T. Brush.

†† With Weil on the verge of bankruptcy the Central Trust Bank took over ownership of the club in November 1933. Powel Crosley purchased the team in February 1934.

== General Managers ==
- Larry MacPhail
- Warren Giles
- Gabe Paul
- Bill DeWitt
- Bob Howsam
- Dick Wagner
- Bob Howsam
- Bill Bergesch
- Murray Cook
- Bob Quinn
- Jim Bowden
- Dan O'Brien
- Wayne Krivsky
- Walt Jocketty
- Dick Williams
- Nick Krall

== Other executives ==
- Howie Bedell (born 1935), farm system director
- Sheldon "Chief" Bender (1919–2008), front office executive and consultant
- Cam Bonifay (born 1952), special assistant to the general manager
- Larry Doughty (born c. 1940), director of scouting
- Nathan Menderson (1820–1904), vice president
- Greg Rhodes, (2007-Current) team historian
- Phil Seghi (1909–1987), director of scouting
- Tal Smith (born 1933), office of the general manager
- Jerry Walker (born 1939), special assistant to the general manager
- Woody Woodward (born 1942), assistant general manager
