= 1953 Cincinnati Redlegs season =

1953 Cincinnati Redlegs
- League: National League
- Ballpark: Crosley Field
- City: Cincinnati
- Owners: Powel Crosley Jr.
- General managers: Gabe Paul
- Managers: Rogers Hornsby; Buster Mills
- Television: WCPO-TV (Waite Hoyt, Bob Gilmore)
- Radio: WCPO (Waite Hoyt, Bob Gilmore)

The 1953 Cincinnati Redlegs season was a season in American baseball. The team finished sixth in the National League with a record of 68–86, 37 games behind the Brooklyn Dodgers. The team changed its name from "Reds" to "Redlegs" prior to this season in response to rampant American anti-communist sentiment during this time period; "Reds" returned six years later in 1959.

== Offseason ==
- October 13, 1952: Jim Bolger was purchased by the Redlegs from the Buffalo Bisons.
- October 14, 1952: Cal Abrams, Joe Rossi, and Gail Henley were traded by the Redlegs to the Pittsburgh Pirates for Gus Bell.

== Regular season ==
=== Season standings ===
National League
Team	W	L	Pct.	GB	Home	Road
Brooklyn Dodgers	105	49	.682	—	60‍–‍17	45‍–‍32
Milwaukee Braves	92	62	.597	13	45‍–‍31	47‍–‍31
Philadelphia Phillies	83	71	.539	22	48‍–‍29	35‍–‍42
St. Louis Cardinals	83	71	.539	22	48‍–‍30	35‍–‍41
New York Giants	70	84	.455	35	38‍–‍39	32‍–‍45
Cincinnati Redlegs	68	86	.442	37	38‍–‍39	30‍–‍47
Chicago Cubs	65	89	.422	40	43‍–‍34	22‍–‍55
Pittsburgh Pirates	50	104	.325	55	26‍–‍51	24‍–‍53

=== Record vs. opponents ===
1953 National League record Sources:
Team	BRO	CHC	CIN	MIL	NYG	PHI	PIT	STL
Brooklyn	—	13–9–1	15–7	13–9	15–7	14–8	20–2	15–7
Chicago	9–13–1	—	12–10	8–14	9–13	5–17	11–11	11–11
Cincinnati	7–15	10–12	—	8–14	9–13	12–10	15–7	7–15–1
Milwaukee	9–13	14–8	14–8	—	14–8–1	13–9–1	15–7	13–9–1
New York	7–15	13–9	13–9	8–14–1	—	9–13	11–11	9–13
Philadelphia	8–14	17–5	10–12	9–13–1	13–9	—	15–7	11–11–1
Pittsburgh	2–20	11–11	7–15	7–15	11–11	7–15	—	5–17
St. Louis	7–15	11–11	15–7–1	9–13–1	13–9	11–11–1	17–5	—

=== Notable transactions ===
- May 1953: Brooks Lawrence was acquired by the Redlegs from the Cleveland Indians.
- May 23, 1953: Eddie Erautt was traded by the Redlegs to the St. Louis Cardinals for Jackie Collum.

=== Roster ===
1953 Cincinnati Redlegs
Roster
Pitchers: 46 Fred Baczewski; 45 Ed Blake; 33 Bubba Church; 34 Jackie Collum; 34 Eddie Erautt; 47 Howie Judson; 33 Bob Kelly; 37 Clyde King; 48 Barney Martin; 46 Ernie Nevel; 39 Joe Nuxhall; 35 Harry Perkowski; 38 Bud Podbielan; 36 Ken Raffensberger; 32 Frank Smith; 31 Herm Wehmeier	Catchers: 2 Ed Bailey; 5,8 Frank Baldwin; 6 Hank Foiles; 5 Hobie Landrith; 7 Andy Seminick; Infielders: 12 Bobby Adams; 14 Rocky Bridges; 15 Grady Hatton; 18 Ted Kluszewski; 11 Roy McMillan; 16 Johnny Temple	Outfielders: 25 Gus Bell; 24 Bob Borkowski; 23 Jim Greengrass; 20 George Lerchen; 20 Bob Marquis; 22 Willard Marshall; 28 Wally Post; 27 Joe Szekely	Manager: 50 Rogers Hornsby; 52 Buster Mills; Coaches: 51 Ford Garrison; 52 Buster Mills

== Player stats ==
=== Batting ===
==== Starters by position ====
Note: Pos = Position; G = Games played; AB = At bats; H = Hits; Avg. = Batting average; HR = Home runs; RBI = Runs batted in

Pos	Player	G	AB	H	Avg.	HR	RBI
C	Andy Seminick	119	387	91	.235	19	64
1B	Ted Kluszewski	149	570	180	.316	40	108
2B	Rocky Bridges	122	432	98	.227	1	21
SS	Roy McMillan	155	557	130	.233	5	43
3B	Bobby Adams	150	607	167	.275	8	49
OF	Jim Greengrass	154	606	173	.285	20	100
OF	Gus Bell	151	610	183	.300	30	105
OF	Willard Marshall	122	357	95	.266	17	62

==== Other batters ====
Note: G = Games played; AB = At bats; H = Hits; Avg. = Batting average; HR = Home runs; RBI = Runs batted in

Player	G	AB	H	Avg.	HR	RBI
Bob Borkowski	94	249	67	.269	7	29
Grady Hatton	83	159	37	.233	7	22
Hobie Landrith	52	154	37	.240	3	16
Johnny Temple	63	110	29	.264	1	9
Bob Marquis	40	44	12	.273	2	3
Wally Post	11	33	8	.242	1	4
Frank Baldwin	16	20	2	.100	0	0
George Lerchen	22	17	5	.294	0	2
Hank Foiles	5	13	2	.154	0	0
Joe Szekely	5	13	1	.077	0	0
Ed Bailey	2	8	3	.375	0	1

=== Pitching ===
==== Starting pitchers ====
Note: G = Games pitched; IP = Innings pitched; W = Wins; L = Losses; ERA = Earned run average; SO = Strikeouts

Player	G	IP	W	L	ERA	SO
Harry Perkowski	33	193.0	12	11	4.52	70
Bud Podbielan	36	186.1	6	16	4.73	74
Ken Raffensberger	26	174.0	7	14	3.93	47
Fred Baczewski	24	138.1	11	4	3.45	58

==== Other pitchers ====
Note: G = Games pitched; IP = Innings pitched; W = Wins; L = Losses; ERA = Earned run average; SO = Strikeouts

Player	G	IP	W	L	ERA	SO
Joe Nuxhall	30	141.2	9	11	4.32	52
Jackie Collum	30	124.2	7	11	3.75	51
Herm Wehmeier	28	81.2	1	6	7.16	32
Clyde King	35	76.0	3	6	5.21	21
Bob Kelly	28	66.1	1	2	4.34	29
Bubba Church	11	43.2	3	3	5.98	12
Howie Judson	10	38.2	0	1	5.59	11

==== Relief pitchers ====
Note: G = Games pitched; W = Wins; L = Losses; SV = Saves; ERA = Earned run average; SO = Strikeouts

Player	G	W	L	SV	ERA	SO
Frank Smith	50	8	1	2	5.49	42
Ernie Nevel	10	0	0	0	6.10	5
Eddie Erautt	4	0	0	0	5.79	1
Barney Martin	1	0	0	0	9.00	1
Ed Blake	1	0	0	0	inf	0

== Farm system ==
Level	Team	League	Manager
AA	Tulsa Oilers	Texas League	Joe Schultz
A	Columbia Reds	Sally League	Ernie White
B	Burlington Flints	Illinois–Indiana–Iowa League	Johnny Vander Meer
C	Ogden Reds	Pioneer League	Earle Brucker Sr.
D	Fitzgerald Pioneers	Georgia–Florida League	Bob Carson, Charlie Ridgeway and Bull Hamons
D	Jackson Generals	KITTY League	Mickey O'Neil
D	Lawton Reds	Sooner State League	Tuck McWilliams
