= 1953 Chicago Cubs season =

1953 Chicago Cubs
- League: National League
- Ballpark: Wrigley Field
- City: Chicago
- Record: 65–89 (.422)
- League place: 7th
- Owners: Philip K. Wrigley
- General managers: Wid Matthews
- Managers: Phil Cavarretta
- Television: WGN-TV (Jack Brickhouse, Harry Creighton)
- Radio: WIND (Bert Wilson, Bud Campbell)

The 1953 Chicago Cubs season was the 82nd season of the Chicago Cubs franchise, the 78th in the National League and the 38th at Wrigley Field. The Cubs finished seventh in the National League with a record of 65–89.

== Regular season ==
=== Season standings ===
National League
Team	W	L	Pct.	GB	Home	Road
Brooklyn Dodgers	105	49	.682	—	60‍–‍17	45‍–‍32
Milwaukee Braves	92	62	.597	13	45‍–‍31	47‍–‍31
Philadelphia Phillies	83	71	.539	22	48‍–‍29	35‍–‍42
St. Louis Cardinals	83	71	.539	22	48‍–‍30	35‍–‍41
New York Giants	70	84	.455	35	38‍–‍39	32‍–‍45
Cincinnati Redlegs	68	86	.442	37	38‍–‍39	30‍–‍47
Chicago Cubs	65	89	.422	40	43‍–‍34	22‍–‍55
Pittsburgh Pirates	50	104	.325	55	26‍–‍51	24‍–‍53

=== Record vs. opponents ===
1953 National League record Sources:
Team	BRO	CHC	CIN	MIL	NYG	PHI	PIT	STL
Brooklyn	—	13–9–1	15–7	13–9	15–7	14–8	20–2	15–7
Chicago	9–13–1	—	12–10	8–14	9–13	5–17	11–11	11–11
Cincinnati	7–15	10–12	—	8–14	9–13	12–10	15–7	7–15–1
Milwaukee	9–13	14–8	14–8	—	14–8–1	13–9–1	15–7	13–9–1
New York	7–15	13–9	13–9	8–14–1	—	9–13	11–11	9–13
Philadelphia	8–14	17–5	10–12	9–13–1	13–9	—	15–7	11–11–1
Pittsburgh	2–20	11–11	7–15	7–15	11–11	7–15	—	5–17
St. Louis	7–15	11–11	15–7–1	9–13–1	13–9	11–11–1	17–5	—

=== Notable transactions ===
- June 4, 1953: Toby Atwell, Bob Schultz, Preston Ward, George Freese, Bob Addis, Gene Hermanski, and $150,000 were traded by the Cubs to the Pittsburgh Pirates for Ralph Kiner, Joe Garagiola, Catfish Metkovich, and Howie Pollet.
- September 8, 1953: Ernie Banks was signed as an amateur free agent by the Cubs.

=== Roster ===
1953 Chicago Cubs
Roster
Pitchers: 31 Fred Baczewski; 33 Bubba Church; 36 Don Elston; 18 Warren Hacker; 26 Sheldon Jones; 33 Bob Kelly; 36 Johnny Klippstein; 20 Dutch Leonard; 35 Turk Lown; 24 Paul Minner; 26 Bill Moisan; 16 Howie Pollet; 17 Bob Rush; 34 Bob Schultz; 30 Duke Simpson; 28 Jim Willis	Catchers: 11 Toby Atwell; 11 Joe Garagiola; 8 Clyde McCullough; 15 Carl Sawatski; Infielders: 37 Gene Baker; 14 Ernie Banks; 12 Tommy Brown; 40 Dee Fondy; 2 Randy Jackson; 21 Eddie Miksis; 5 Bob Ramazzotti; 6 Bill Serena; 39 Roy Smalley Jr.	Outfielders: 16 Bob Addis; 7 Frank Baumholtz; 22 Gene Hermanski; 4,3 Hal Jeffcoat; 4 Ralph Kiner; 22 Catfish Metkovich; 9 Hank Sauer; 14 Paul Schramka; 10 Bob Talbot; 29 Preston Ward; Other batters: 44 Phil Cavarretta	Manager: 44 Phil Cavarretta; Coaches: 3,29 Ray Blades; 47 Spud Davis; 42 Roy Johnson; 49 Charlie Root

== Player stats ==
=== Batting ===
==== Starters by position ====
Note: Pos = Position; G = Games played; AB = At bats; H = Hits; Avg. = Batting average; HR = Home runs; RBI = Runs batted in

Pos	Player	G	AB	H	Avg.	HR	RBI
C	Clyde McCullough	77	229	59	.258	6	23
1B	Dee Fondy	150	594	184	.309	18	78
2B	Eddie Miksis	142	577	145	.251	8	39
SS	Roy Smalley Jr.	82	253	63	.249	6	25
3B	Randy Jackson	139	498	142	.285	19	66
OF	Ralph Kiner	117	414	117	.283	28	87
OF	Frank Baumholtz	133	520	159	.306	3	25
OF	Hank Sauer	108	395	104	.263	19	60

==== Other batters ====
Note: G = Games played; AB = At bats; H = Hits; Avg. = Batting average; HR = Home runs; RBI = Runs batted in

Player	G	AB	H	Avg.	HR	RBI
Bill Serena	93	275	69	.251	10	52
Joe Garagiola	74	228	62	.272	1	21
Hal Jeffcoat	106	183	43	.235	4	22
Tommy Brown	65	138	27	.196	2	13
George Metkovich	61	124	29	.234	2	12
Preston Ward	33	100	23	.230	4	12
Toby Atwell	24	74	17	.230	1	8
Carl Sawatski	43	59	13	.220	1	5
Gene Hermanski	18	40	6	.150	0	1
Bob Ramazzotti	26	39	6	.154	0	4
Ernie Banks	10	35	11	.314	2	6
Bob Talbot	8	30	10	.333	0	0
Gene Baker	7	22	5	.227	0	0
Phil Cavarretta	27	21	6	.286	0	3
Bob Addis	10	12	2	.167	0	1
Paul Schramka	2	0	0	----	0	0

=== Pitching ===
==== Starting pitchers ====
Note: G = Games pitched; IP = Innings pitched; W = Wins; L = Losses; ERA = Earned run average; SO = Strikeouts

Player	G	IP	W	L	ERA	SO
Warren Hacker	39	221.2	12	19	4.38	106
Paul Minner	31	201.0	12	15	4.21	64
Bob Rush	29	166.2	9	14	4.54	84

==== Other pitchers ====
Note: G = Games pitched; IP = Innings pitched; W = Wins; L = Losses; ERA = Earned run average; SO = Strikeouts

Player	G	IP	W	L	ERA	SO
Johnny Klippstein	48	167.2	10	11	4.83	113
Turk Lown	49	148.1	8	7	5.16	76
Howie Pollet	25	111.1	5	6	4.12	45
Bubba Church	27	104.1	4	5	5.00	47
Jim Willis	13	43.1	2	1	3.12	15
Bob Schultz	7	11.2	0	2	5.40	4
Don Elston	2	5.0	0	1	14.40	2

==== Relief pitchers ====
Note: G = Games pitched; W = Wins; L = Losses; SV = Saves; ERA = Earned run average; SO = Strikeouts

Player	G	W	L	SV	ERA	SO
Dutch Leonard	45	2	3	9	4.60	27
Duke Simpson	30	1	2	0	8.00	21
Sheldon Jones	22	0	2	0	5.40	9
Bob Kelly	14	0	1	0	9.53	6
Fred Baczewski	9	0	0	0	6.30	3
Bill Moisan	3	0	0	0	5.40	1

== Farm system ==
Level	Team	League	Manager
Open	Los Angeles Angels	Pacific Coast League	Stan Hack
AAA	Springfield Cubs	International League	Bruce Edwards and Jack Sheehan
A	Macon Peaches	Sally League	Frank Kerr
A	Des Moines Bruins	Western League	Kemp Wicker and Bruce Edwards
B	Cedar Rapids Indians	Illinois–Indiana–Iowa League	Al Kubski and Bill Prince
C	Stockton Ports	California League	Bill Salkeld
C	Sioux Falls Canaries	Northern League	Dale Lynch
D	Gainesville Owls	Sooner State League	Jimmy Grigg, Ernie Shadid and Jesse Landrum
D	Hickory Rebels	Tar Heel League	Bill Parker
D	Janesville Cubs	Wisconsin State League	Bob Dant

LEAGUE CHAMPIONS: Des Moines
