= Dick Williams (executive) =

American professional baseball executive

Richard Williams (born ca. 1971) is an American former professional baseball executive and the former president of baseball operations of the Cincinnati Reds of Major League Baseball. Before his promotion, announced on December 27, 2016, he was the Reds' senior vice president and general manager.

Williams is a graduate of the University of Virginia. He was an Echols Scholar at UVA, giving him priority to sign up for any class. He worked as an investment banker and from 2003–04 for the George W. Bush presidential re-election campaign. He joined the Reds in 2006, upon their purchase by a group led by majority owner Robert Castellini, as director of baseball business operations. He later became vice president of baseball operations and then was named vp/assistant GM in November 2014. Twelve months later, he was promoted to general manager, working under Walt Jocketty, then president of baseball operations. Jocketty became an advisor to Castellini with Williams' December 2016 appointment.

The Williams family's official connection with the Reds dates back 50 years. Dick Williams' grandfather, William J. Sr., and great-uncle James were key members of a 13-party ownership group headed by Francis L. Dale, publisher of The Cincinnati Enquirer, that acquired the team from Bill DeWitt Sr. in December 1966. The Williams brothers initially held 15 percent of the club's stock. Under this basic ownership group, and led by general manager Bob Howsam, the Reds became a baseball dynasty during the early 1970s as "The Big Red Machine." William and James Williams served as the majority owners of the Reds from 1980–84; they sold controlling interest in the franchise to Marge Schott in December 1984. Dick Williams' father, Joe, and an uncle, Thomas, are minority shareholders in Castellini's ownership group. Joe Williams is the club's incumbent board chairman and Tom is vice-chairman and treasurer.

On October 7, 2020, Dick Williams stepped down from his position with the Reds after five seasons as president of baseball operations.
