= Bob Marquis (baseball) =

American baseball player (1924-2007)

- Outfielder
- Born: December 23, 1924; Oklahoma City, Oklahoma, U.S.
- Died: December 28, 2007 (aged 83); Beaumont, Texas, U.S.
- Batted: Left Threw: Left

MLB debut
- April 17, 1953, for the Cincinnati Redlegs

Last MLB appearance
- July 7, 1953, for the Cincinnati Redlegs

MLB statistics
- Batting average: .273
- Home Runs: 2
- RBI: 3
- Stats at Baseball Reference

Teams
- Cincinnati Redlegs (1953)

Robert Rudolph Marquis (December 23, 1924 – December 28, 2007) was an American professional baseball player and outfielder whose eight-year career (1947–1954) included a stint with the Cincinnati Redlegs of Major League Baseball in its 1953 season. A native of Oklahoma City, Oklahoma, Marquis batted and threw left-handed. He stood 6 feet 1 inch (1.85 m) tall and weighed 170 pounds (77 kg).

Marquis began his professional career in 1947 with the Lufkin Foresters, hitting .346 with 22 doubles and 16 triples in 140 games. He was sent to the Beaumont Exporters in the New York Yankees system, where he played in four games, going 0-for-1 at the plate. In 1948, he played for Beaumont (two games) and the Quincy Gems (126), hitting a combined .333 with 15 home runs, 18 triples and 21 doubles.

Marquis split the 1949 season between Beaumont (20 games) and the Binghamton Triplets (106), hitting a combined .236 in 453 at-bats. He then hit .293 in 151 games for Beaumont in 1950. The next year, he hit .278 in 123 games with the Kansas City Blues. He returned to Kansas City in 1952, hitting .246 in 97 games. On August 28, 1952, he was traded to Cincinnati along with Jim Greengrass, Ernie Nevel, Johnny Schmitz and $35,000 in exchange for Ewell Blackwell. At the time, Baseball Hall of Famer Rogers Hornsby, who had been managerr of Marquis in the minor leagues in 1950, was the Redlegs in 1952.

Marquis made his big league debut on April 17, 1953. In 40 games with the Redlegs (as the Reds were known from 1953–1958), he hit .273 with two home runs, a triple and a double in 44 at-bats. Despite posting an OPS+ of 108, that would end up being his only year in the big leagues, he played his final game on July 7. He also spent 61 games in the minors that year; with the Portland Beavers he hit .271. Back in the minors in 1954, he hit .282 with 16 triples in 143 games for Beaumont.

Marquis died in 2007 in Beaumont, Texas, at the age of 83. He was interred at Forest Lawn Memorial Park in Beaumont.
