= Noppert =

Noppert is a surname. Notable people with the surname include:

- Andries Noppert (born 1994), Dutch footballer
- Danny Noppert (born 1990), Dutch darts player

== See also ==
- Nippert
- Oppert
