= Nippert =

Nippert is a surname. Notable people with the surname include:

- Carl L. Nippert (1852–1904), German-American engineer and politician
- Dustin Nippert (born 1981), American baseball player
- Louis Nippert (1903–1992), American businessman
- Louise Nippert (1911–2012), American businesswoman

== See also ==
- Nippert Stadium
