= Duke Simpson =

American baseball player (1927–2021)

- Pitcher
- Born: September 15, 1927; Columbus, Ohio, U.S.
- Died: February 7, 2021 (aged 93); Folsom, California, U.S.
- Batted: Right Threw: Right

MLB debut
- May 6, 1953, for the Chicago Cubs

Last MLB appearance
- September 17, 1953, for the Chicago Cubs

MLB statistics
- Win–loss record: 1–2
- Earned run average: 8.00
- Strikeouts: 21
- Stats at Baseball Reference

Teams
- Chicago Cubs (1953)

Thomas Leo "Duke" Simpson (September 15, 1927 – February 7, 2021) was an American professional baseball player. A right-handed pitcher, Simpson had a seven-year (1948–1954) career, which included a full, 1953 season in Major League Baseball for the Chicago Cubs. He stood 6 feet 1 inch (1.85 m) tall and weighed 190 pounds (86 kg).

== Biography ==
Simpson was born in Columbus, Ohio. He attended Notre Dame but after only one semester, joined the United States Army in 1945 during the waning days of World War II. After completing his military service, Simpson enrolled at Ohio State before joining the professional baseball ranks. He pitched in the Philadelphia Athletics' system and was acquired by the Cubs in 1952.

In 1953, Simpson made the Cubs' MLB roster coming out of spring training and remained a member of their pitching staff all season, working in 30 games, 29 in relief. In his only start, he failed to record an out on September 2 against the Pittsburgh Pirates at Forbes Field, yielding five runs, all earned, and four hits, including a three-run home run by Preston Ward. Simpson took the loss in that 8–1 Cub defeat. One week later, against the Pirates at Wrigley Field, he won his only MLB game. Simpson entered the game in the ninth inning with the Cubs trailing, 7–5, and worked a perfect 1-2-3 frame. Then, in the bottom of the ninth, Cub slugger Ralph Kiner hit a three-run walk-off home run against his old Pirate mates to give Simpson the 8–7 win. Altogether, Simpson allowed 60 hits and 25 bases on balls in 45 MLB innings pitched, striking out 21.

Simpson died February 7, 2021, from Alzheimer's disease.
