= Louis Nippert =

American attorney and baseball team owner

- Born: December 24, 1903; Cincinnati, Ohio
- Died: November 16, 1992 (aged 88); Cincinnati, Ohio
- Education: University of Cincinnati
- Occupation: Attorney
- Known for: Owner of the Cincinnati Reds (1973–1980)
- Spouse: Louise Dieterle (m. 1935)
- Awards: 2× National League champions (1975, 1976); 2× World Series champions (1975, 1976)

Louis Nippert (December 24, 1903 – November 16, 1992) was an American attorney and majority owner of the Cincinnati Reds of Major League Baseball (MLB) from January 1973 to February 1981.

== Biography ==
Nippert was born in Cincinnati in 1903, a great-grandson of James Gamble, a founder of Procter & Gamble. Nippert attended the University of Cincinnati, where he was a member of Sigma Alpha Epsilon fraternity and earned his law degree in 1928. He was awarded an honorary doctorate in 1971. He worked as an attorney, and served two terms in the Ohio House of Representatives, having won election in November 1928 and November 1930 as a Republican candidate representing Hamilton County.

In December 1966, Nippert bought into the Cincinnati Reds as part of the ownership group led by Francis L. Dale. He bought majority control of the franchise in January 1973. Nippert was at the helm for the Reds' most successful era, in which they won the World Series of 1975 and 1976. Like Dale before him, Nippert was mostly a hands-off owner, leaving the team in the hands of general manager Bob Howsam, who added the title of team president when Nippert became principal owner.

On February 20, 1981, Nippert sold his interest to a group headed by minority owners William and James Williams.

Nippert was also a limited owner of the Cincinnati Bengals of the National Football League. Nippert Stadium in Cincinnati, home field of the Cincinnati Bearcats football team, was named after his brother, James, who died following an injury in a college football game in 1923.

Nippert died in November 1992 at the age of 89. He was married and was survived by his wife, Louise, who died in July 2012 at the age of 100.
