= Bill Moisan =

American baseball player (1925–2010)

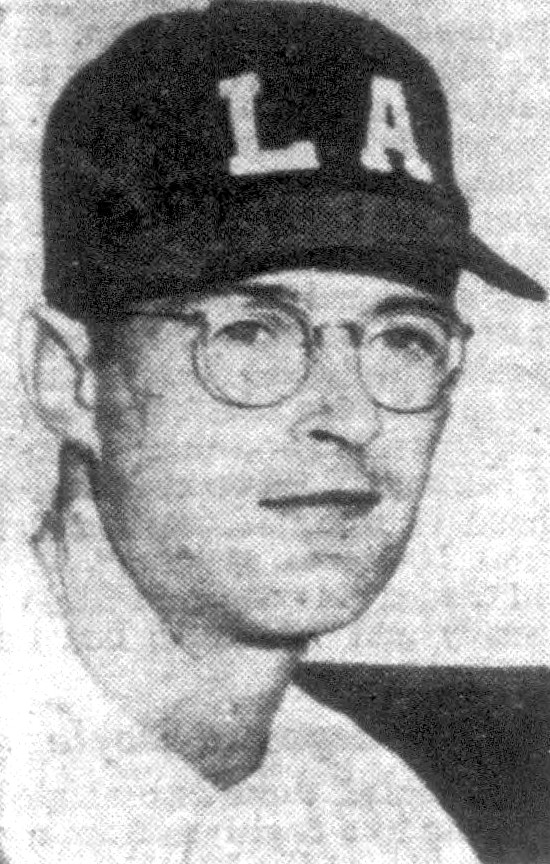
- Moisan in 1953
- Pitcher
- Born: July 30, 1925; Bradford, Massachusetts, U.S.
- Died: April 9, 2010 (aged 84); Brentwood, New Hampshire, U.S.
- Batted: Left Threw: Right

MLB debut
- September 17, 1953, for the Chicago Cubs

Last MLB appearance
- September 25, 1953, for the Chicago Cubs

MLB statistics
- Win–loss record: 0–0
- Earned run average: 5.40
- Innings: 5
- Stats at Baseball Reference

Teams
- Chicago Cubs (1953)

William Joseph Moisan, Jr. (July 30, 1925 – April 9, 2010) was an American pitcher in Major League Baseball who played briefly for the Chicago Cubs during the 1953 season. Listed at 6 ft 1 in (1.85 m), 170 lb., he batted left-handed and threw right-handed.

== Biography ==
Moisan was the son of William J. and Beatrice A. (Currier) Moisan. He was born in Bradford, Massachusetts, and grew up in Newton, New Hampshire. In his youth he was interested in baseball, and aspired to become a major leaguer. He graduated at Sanborn Seminary, Kingston, and went on to attend McIntosh Business College before entering military service in December 1943.

Following his military discharge, Moisan signed with the Chicago Cubs organization as a free agent in the spring of 1946. Due to the nature of his injury and his inability to remain as a first baseman, he had the Cubs' support when he made the decision to transition to a pitcher. Basically a knuckleballer, he also was used in pinch-hitting duties.

In his professional debut, Moisan posted a combined record of 15–12 and a 3.11 earned run average in 36 games while pitching in the PONY and Tri-State leagues. He would spend the next six years in the minor leagues before gaining a promotion to the majors with the 1953 Cubs. In three relief appearances, he allowed three earned runs on five hits and two walks while striking out one batter in 5.0 innings of work. Moisan's one strikeout came against the great Stan Musial. He did not have a decision.

Moisan continued pitching in the minors until 1956. His most productive years came in the Pacific League with the PCL Los Angeles Angels, averaging for them 12 wins per season from 1950 to 1953, with a career-high 16 wins in 1952. In ten minor league seasons, he had a 98–96 record with a 3.81 ERA in 329 games, 135 as a starter. A .222 lifetime hitter, he enjoyed his best season in 1953, posting career numbers in average (.284), runs (15), hits (40), home runs (four), RBI (23), OBP (.327) and SLG (.418). During his time with the Los Angeles Angels he was once the roommate of actor and professional athlete Chuck Connors.

Following his playing retirement, Moisan remained involved with baseball for a significant number of years, mainly coaching teams near his home in New Hampshire. He also served as the nuclear materials manager at the Portsmouth Naval Shipyard until 1985.

Moisan died in Brentwood, New Hampshire, at the age of 84.
