= Frank Baldwin (baseball) =

American baseball player (1928-2004)

- Catcher
- Born: December 25, 1928; High Bridge, New Jersey, U.S.
- Died: November 18, 2004 (aged 75); Beaver, Ohio, U.S.
- Batted: Right Threw: Right

MLB debut
- April 22, 1953, for the Cincinnati Redlegs

Last MLB appearance
- September 5, 1953, for the Cincinnati Redlegs

MLB statistics
- Batting average: .100
- Home runs: 0
- Runs batted in: 0
- Stats at Baseball Reference

Teams
- Cincinnati Redlegs (1953)

Frank DeWitt Baldwin (December 25, 1928 – November 18, 2004) was an American professional baseball player, a catcher who played one full season in Major League Baseball with the 1953 Cincinnati Redlegs. The native of High Bridge, New Jersey, threw and batted right-handed, stood 5 feet 11 inches (1.80 m) tall and weighed 195 pounds (88 kg).

Baldwin's full pro career lasted for a dozen seasons (1947–1956; 1958–1959). He originally signed with the Boston Braves, then played briefly in the Brooklyn Dodger organization before being selected by Cincinnati in the 1952 Rule 5 draft. As a member of the 1953 Redlegs, he played in only 16 games and batted 20 times, collecting two singles. The first was a pinch hit off Pittsburgh Pirates' lefthander Paul LaPalme on May 2; the second came three weeks later, during one of his three 1953 starting catcher assignments, against Eddie Erautt of the St. Louis Cardinals. Baldwin was Cincinnati's third-string receiver that year, playing behind Andy Seminick and Hobie Landrith. Ed Bailey and Hank Foiles, also rookies, also caught a handful of games for the Redlegs that season. They would go on to long MLB careers.

Baldwin returned to minor league baseball in 1954, and played five more seasons, mostly at the Double-A level.

Baldwin lived in both Hartwell and West Chester, Ohio, retiring in 1988 and moving to Beaver.
