= John Glenn (1960s outfielder) =

American baseball player (1929–2023)

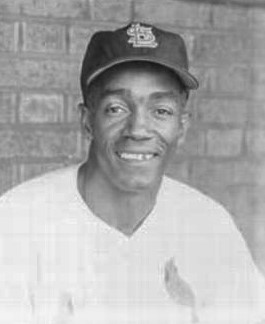
- Outfielder
- Born: July 10, 1929; Moultrie, Georgia, U.S.
- Died: June 4, 2023 (aged 93); Delran Township, New Jersey, U.S.
- Batted: Right Threw: Right

MLB debut
- June 16, 1960, for the St. Louis Cardinals

Last MLB appearance
- July 31, 1960, for the St. Louis Cardinals

MLB statistics
- Batting average: .258
- Home runs: 0
- Runs batted in: 5
- Stats at Baseball Reference

Teams
- St. Louis Cardinals (1960)

John Glenn (July 10, 1929 – June 4, 2023) was an American professional baseball player who played in Major League Baseball as an outfielder. Over the course of 15 minor league seasons, he made appearances in 32 games for the St. Louis Cardinals in 1960.

Born in Moultrie, Georgia, Glenn died in Delran Township, New Jersey, on June 4, 2023, at the age of 93.

== Sources ==
- Career statistics from Baseball Reference · Baseball Reference (Minors) · Retrosheet · Baseball Almanac
