= Aaron S. Stern =

American business executive, theatrical producer, and baseball executive (1854–1920)

- Stern in 1888
- Born: c. 1854 (Note: When Stern was born is unclear. His obituary stated that he was born in June 1853. His gravestone, as seen in online photos, reads 1854. Ancestry.com records suggest January 1855.); Bloomington, Illinois, US
- Died: April 3, 1920 (aged 65–66); Cincinnati, Ohio, US
- Occupations: Clothing firm executive; Theatrical producer; Executive with the Cincinnati Red Stockings

Aaron S. Stern (c. 1854 – April 3, 1920) was an American clothing firm executive and theatrical producer. He is best remembered as an executive with the Cincinnati Red Stockings, a major league professional baseball team, during the 1880s. The Red Stockings competed in the American Association through 1889, then moved to the National League in 1890, where they have competed to the present day as the Cincinnati Reds.

== Biography ==
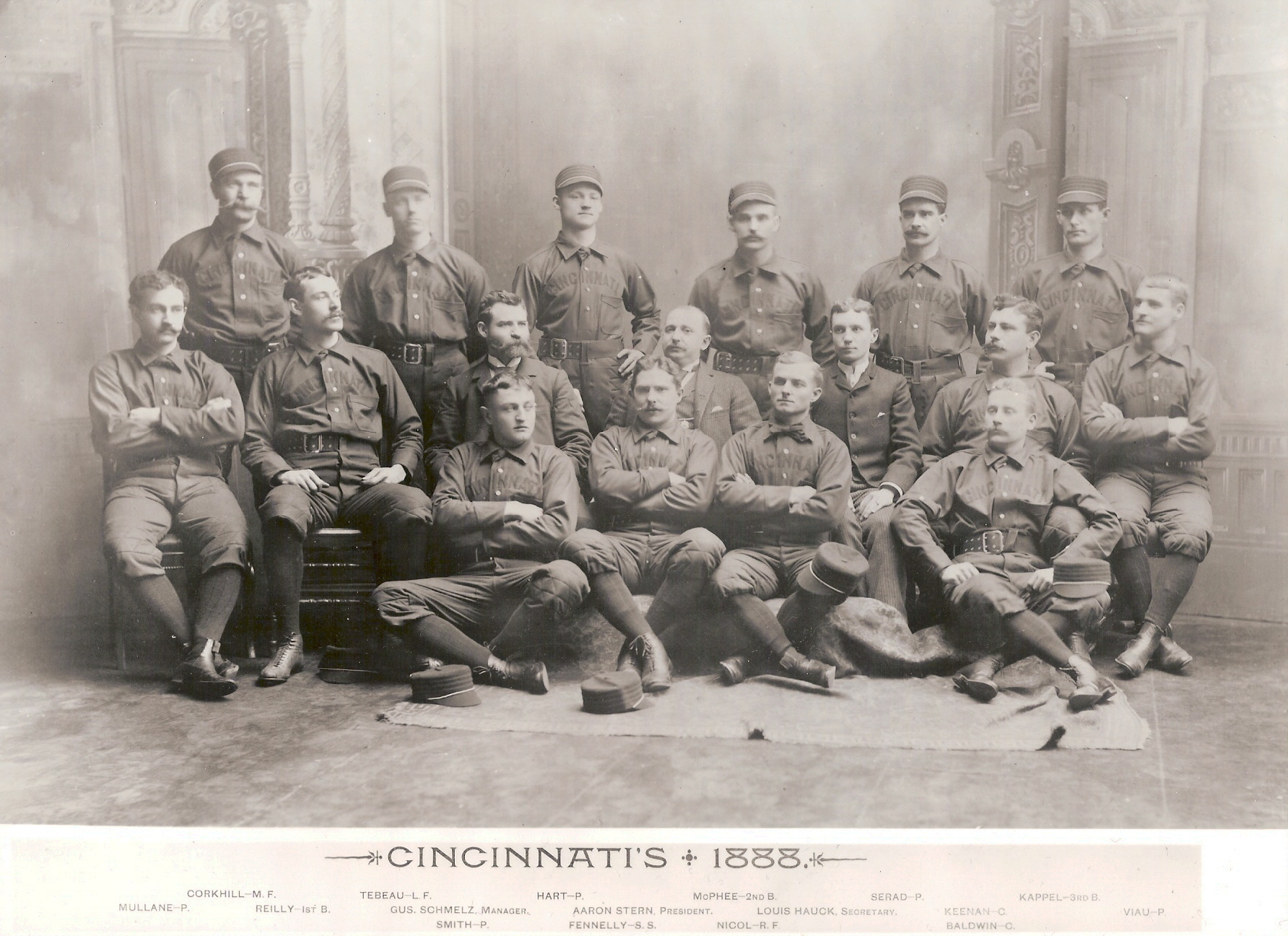
1888 Red Stockings team photo with Stern at center (in suit)

Stern was a stockholder of the Cincinnati Red Stockings by the 1882 season. With Justus Thorner as team president, the 1882 Red Stockings finished in first place in the American Association. Prior to the 1883 season, Stern was elected as president of the team. He was president at the conclusion of the 1890 season, (Note: It is unclear if Stern was team president continuously from 1883 to 1890.) when the team was sold.

Stern was the controlling owner of the Red Stockings at two different points in time. He initially owned the team during the 1884 season, preceded by Thorner and followed by George Herancourt, and later owned the team during the 1887–1890 seasons, preceded by John Hauck and followed by John T. Brush. (Note: Al Johnson briefly owned the team during the 1890–91 offseason, between Stern and Brush.) (Note: Stern's obituary stated that he was the team's president "when they won the pennant in the American Association in 1882 and retained his interest until 1887".) Although personally generous, as an owner Stern was considered a penny-pincher, cutting salaries and costs in order to keep the team afloat.

Born in Bloomington, Illinois, Stern never married. He headed the Cincinnati clothing firm of Stern, Lauer and Shohl. In 1906, he changed professions, moving to New York City where he became a theatrical producer. Stern died in Cincinnati in April 1920 and was buried in United Jewish Cemetery there.
