= John Hauck =

German-born American brewer and baseball executive

- Born: August 20, 1829; Munich, Bavaria (Note: At the time of Hauck's birth, Bavaria was part of the German Confederation.) (Note: Hauck's obituary gave his place of birth as "Muehoffen-Bergzabern" in Bavaria.)
- Died: June 4, 1896 (aged 66); Newport, Kentucky
- Occupations: Brewery owner; Bank president; Executive of the Cincinnati Red Stockings
- Known for: Beer, the John Hauck House
- Partner: Catherine Hauck

John Hauck (August 20, 1829 – June 4, 1896) was a German-born American brewer and bank president. He was also an executive of the Cincinnati Red Stockings professional baseball team in the mid-1880s. His former residence in Cincinnati is now the offices of Cincinnati Preservation Association.

== Biography ==
Advertisement for Hauck's brewery from Cincinnati's Westliche Blatter newspaper of August 12, 1883

Hauck came to the United States from Bavaria at the age of 22, and worked for his uncle, Cincinnati brewer George M. Herancourt. In 1863, Hauck formed his own beer brewery, originally named Hauck & Windisch and later the John Hauck Brewing Company, in Cincinnati's west end, and soon became wealthy. Hauck was also president of the city's German National Bank.

Hauck became principal owner of the Cincinnati Red Stockings after the 1885 season, taking over from George L. Herancourt, his cousin, who went bankrupt. Hauck delegated to his son, Louis, the day-to-day management of the club. The 1886 Red Stockings finished in fifth place in the American Association. Following that season, Hauck sold the team to Aaron S. Stern, who had previously owned the team several years earlier.

Hauck was married in 1858; he and his wife, Catherine, had a son and a daughter. Hauck died in June 1896 and was buried in Cincinnati's Spring Grove Cemetery.
