= Joe Szekely =

American baseball player (1925–1995)

- Rightfielder
- Born: February 2, 1925; Cleveland, Ohio, U.S.
- Died: October 16, 1995 (aged 70); Paris, Texas, U.S.
- Batted: Right Threw: Right

MLB debut
- September 13, 1953, for the Cincinnati Redlegs

Last MLB appearance
- September 27, 1953, for the Cincinnati Redlegs

MLB statistics
- Batting average: .077
- Home runs: 0
- Runs batted in: 0
- Stats at Baseball Reference

Teams
- Cincinnati Redlegs (1953)

Joseph Szekely (February 2, 1925 – October 16, 1995) was an American professional baseball player, an outfielder who played professionally for six seasons (1949–1954) and who appeared in five Major League games for the 1953 Cincinnati Redlegs.

Born in Cleveland, Ohio, Szekely attended Baylor University; he threw and batted right-handed, stood 5 feet 11 inches (1.80 m) tall and weighed 180 pounds (82 kg). His son, Joe Szekely, a catcher in minor league baseball from 1982 to 1992, is a longtime minor league manager and instructor who spent the 2011 season as a coach in the Tampa Bay Rays' organization.

The elder Szekely debuted in the major leagues on September 13, 1953, as the starting right fielder in a doubleheader against the Pittsburgh Pirates at Crosley Field. He went hitless in seven at bats that day. Two unsuccessful at bats as a pinch hitter extended Szekely's hitless skein to nine. But in what would be his final Major League game on September 27, he started in right field against star Milwaukee Braves lefthander Warren Spahn — a future Hall of Famer — and collected his only MLB hit, a single, in four times at bat. All told, he batted 13 times in the Majors, scored no runs, and struck out three times.

His minor league career was spent in two circuits, the Double-A Texas League and the Class B Big State League.
