= George Herancourt =

American business executive and baseball team owner

- Born: 1856; Cincinnati, Ohio, US
- Died: unknown, after 1888
- Occupations: Brewery executive; Treasurer of the city of Cincinnati (1883–1885); Executive of the Cincinnati Red Stockings

George L. Herancourt (1856 – after 1888) was an American business executive, best known as the managing owner of the Cincinnati Red Stockings baseball team during the 1885 season. He also served one term as the treasurer of the city of Cincinnati.

== Biography ==
George L. Herancourt was the son of wealthy Cincinnati brewer George M. Herancourt (1807–1880). He helped manage his father's business interests, being promoted to vice president of the Herancourt Brewing Company, and branched out into baseball and selling fish. At the time of his father's death, Herancourt had seven living siblings; three sisters and four brothers.

In 1880, Herancourt was elected treasurer of the Cincinnati Stars of the National League, who competed for just one season. He was one of the founders of the American Association in 1881, attending the founding meeting with fellow townsmen Aaron S. Stern and O. P. Caylor, and was elected secretary-treasurer of the city's new team, the Cincinnati Red Stockings.

After the 1884 season, Herancourt took over as managing owner of the team from Stern, and incorporated the club. The 1885 Red Stockings had some success on the field, finishing in second place in the American Association. However, Herancourt's timing was unfortunate, as the Reds lost money under his management, and the overextended Herancourt had paid his partners too much for their shares.

As a Democrat, Herancourt was elected city treasurer in 1883, serving one two-year term. He lost his bid for reelection in 1885. About this time he went bankrupt, having dissipated a large fortune, and there were reports that the treasurer's office had a shortfall in its accounts. The personable Herancourt was referenced in local paper as being an "associate of gamblers and prostitutes." Amidst lawsuits, charges and countercharges, Herancourt's interest in the baseball team was taken over by John Hauck, his cousin and also a wealthy brewer, and Herancourt disappeared.

Credible reports place Herancourt as a dollar-a-day laborer in Los Angeles, in 1888, a location backed up by unclaimed letters at that city's post office. His whereabouts after that time remain unknown. At the time of his father's death in 1880, Herancourt had seven siblings: three sisters and four brothers.
