= Jay Van Noy =

American baseball player (1928–2010)

- Outfielder
- Born: November 4, 1928; Garland, Utah, U.S.
- Died: November 6, 2010 (aged 82); Logan, Utah, U.S.
- Batted: Left Threw: Right

MLB debut
- June 18, 1951, for the St. Louis Cardinals

Last MLB appearance
- June 28, 1951, for the St. Louis Cardinals

MLB statistics
- Batting average: .000
- At-bats: 7
- Runs scored: 1
- Stats at Baseball Reference

Teams
- St. Louis Cardinals (1951)

Jay Lowell Van Noy (November 4, 1928 – November 6, 2010) was an American professional baseball player who spent all but six of his 1,100-plus-game career in minor league baseball. An outfielder born in Garland, Utah, his only Major League Baseball experience came in the middle of the 1951 season as a member of the St. Louis Cardinals. He batted left-handed, threw right-handed and was listed as 6 feet 1 inch (1.85 m) tall and 200 pounds (91 kg).

Van Noy attended Utah State University, where he excelled in four sports: baseball, football, basketball and track. He was selected by the Los Angeles Rams in the tenth round of the 1950 National Football League Draft, but elected to play baseball. Van Noy's six MLB games occurred in June 1951 when the Cardinals recalled him from Triple-A Rochester. He drew a base on balls off Sal Maglie of the New York Giants in his first at bat, but seven subsequent plate appearances produced six strikeouts and Van Noy returned to the minor leagues for good. From 1957–1959, while he was still an active player, Van Noy spent his springs as head baseball coach at Brigham Young University, where he fashioned a 50–24–1 win–loss record. He later was recreation director of the city of Logan, Utah.

He was elected to the Utah Sports Hall of Fame (1997) and the Utah State University Sports Hall of Fame (2007). In 1999, Sports Illustrated named Van Noy one of the top 50 Utah athletes of the 20th century.
