= Pablo Mesa =

Cuban baseball player (born 1898)

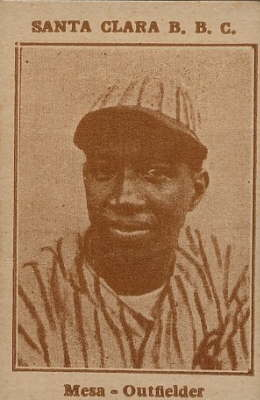
- Corner outfielder
- Born: 1898; Caibarien, Cuba
- Batted: Left Threw: Left

Negro league baseball debut
- 1923, for the Cuban Stars (East)

Last appearance
- 1927, for the Cuban Stars (East)

Eastern Colored League statistics
- Batting average: .286
- Home runs: 4
- Runs batted in: 82

Teams
- Cuban Stars (East) (1923-1927)

Pablo "Champion" Mesa (1898 - death date unknown) was a Cuban professional baseball corner outfielder in the Negro leagues. He played from 1923 to 1927 with the Cuban Stars (East).
