= Frank Smith (catcher) =

American baseball player (1857–1928)

- Catcher
- Born: November 24, 1857; Fonthill, Ontario, Canada
- Died: October 11, 1928 (aged 70); Canandaigua, New York
- Batted: Right Threw: Unknown

MLB debut
- August 6, 1884, for the Pittsburgh Alleghenys

Last MLB appearance
- October 3, 1884, for the Pittsburgh Alleghenys

MLB statistics
- Batting average: .250
- Home runs: 0
- Runs batted in: 0
- Stats at Baseball Reference

Teams
- Pittsburgh Alleghenys (1884)

Frank L. Smith (1857–1928) was a Major League Baseball player who played catcher for the 1884 Pittsburgh Alleghenys.
