= Oppert =

Oppert is a German surname. Notable people with the surname include:

- Julius Oppert (1825–1905), French-German Assyriologist
- Ernst Oppert (1832–1903), German businessman
- Gustav Solomon Oppert (1836–1908), German Indologist
- Marie Oppert (born 1997), iFrench singer and actress
