= Clyde McNeal =

- Shortstop
- Born: December 15, 1928; San Antonio, Texas, US
- Died: April 14, 1996 (aged 67); San Antonio, Texas, US
- Batted: Right Threw: Right

Negro league baseball debut
- 1945, for the Chicago American Giants

Last Mexican League appearance
- 1955, for the Sultanes de Monterrey
- Stats at Baseball Reference

Teams
- Chicago American Giants (1945–1950); Sultanes de Monterrey (1955)

Clyde Clifton "Junior" McNeal (December 15, 1928 – April 14, 1996) was an American professional baseball shortstop in the Negro leagues, minor leagues and in the Mexican League. He played from 1945 to 1957 with several teams. McNeal played for the Chicago American Giants from 1945 to 1950. He also played in the Brooklyn Dodgers minor league system from 1953 to 1957, and with the Sultanes de Monterrey in 1955.

McNeal was born to parents William James McNeal and Lela Fifer McNeal.
