= Frank Wilson (umpire) =

American baseball umpire (1890-1928)

Frank Wilson (1890–1928) was an American professional baseball umpire. He worked in Major League Baseball umpire from 1921 to his death in 1928, serving stints in both the American and National Leagues.

== Early career ==
He began playing professional baseball as a catcher in the old Class C South Atlantic League ("Sally League") in 1911, but had to give up playing early in that season due to an arm injury. He then umpired college baseball games, before moving up to the then-Class AA Western League. In 1921, Wilson was appointed as an American League umpire by Ban Johnson. Two years later, in 1923, he became a National League umpire.

== Notable games ==
In May 1922, player-manager Ty Cobb and outfielder Harry Heilmann of the Detroit Tigers engaged in a heated argument with Wilson during a game with the St. Louis Browns. Cobb, it was alleged, deliberately stepped on Wilson's foot during the confrontation and then refused to leave the field after Wilson ejected him from the game, resulting in Cobb's suspension by American League President Ban Johnson on May 30. However, a dispute over the game ensued between Johnson and Wilson; the umpire resigned early in the season and joined the National League staff for 1923.

In a spring training game between the New York Yankees and the Boston Braves in St. Petersburg, Florida, on March 24, 1927, Wilson ejected nine Yankee players early in the game for heckling him from the bench, only to have them return unnoticed to the dugout later in the game. In the fifth inning, the New York Times reported the next day, Wilson discovered their transgression after he called out Babe Ruth in an attempt to steal home, whereupon he ejected the same nine Yankees a second time, prompting the Times reporter to write sardonically that, "It was fortunate that Mr. Wilson was in such an amusing frame of mind".

== Death ==
On June 12, 1928, Wilson died of acute appendicitis at Victory Memorial Hospital in Brooklyn, New York at age 38. He was survived by his wife and two sons. He fell ill more than a week before his death and underwent two surgeries before he died.
