= Charlie Jordan (baseball) =

American baseball player (1871–1928)

- Pitcher
- Born: October 4, 1871; Philadelphia, Pennsylvania, U.S.
- Died: June 1, 1928 (aged 56); Hazleton, Pennsylvania, U.S.
- Batted: Unknown Threw: Unknown

MLB debut
- July 31, 1896, for the Philadelphia Phillies

Last MLB appearance
- August 10, 1896, for the Philadelphia Phillies

MLB statistics
- Win–loss record: 0–0
- Earned run average: 7.71
- Strikeouts: 3
- Stats at Baseball Reference

Teams
- Philadelphia Phillies (1896)

Charles T. Jordan (October 4, 1871 – June 1, 1928), nicknamed "Kid", was an American Major League Baseball pitcher who played for the 1896 Philadelphia Phillies.
