= Louise Nippert =

Nippert

Louise Dieterle Nippert (August 27, 1911 – July 23, 2012) was an American businesswoman who was owner of the Cincinnati Reds baseball team, as well as a patron of the arts and a performer with the Cincinnati Symphony Orchestra.

== Cincinnati Reds ==
Nippert, along with her husband Louis Nippert, became majority owner of the Reds in 1973, after having an ownership interest in the team since 1966. They sold their majority ownership in 1981, though they retained a minority stake in the team, under Louise Nippert's name, until her 2012 death.

== Patron of the arts ==
Nippert supported the arts. One of the wealthiest persons in Cincinnati, she donated $85 million in 2009 to help maintain Cincinnati's orchestra. She also sponsored the University of Cincinnati's Conservatory of Music.

A classically trained singer, Nippert was a soloist in Mahler's Symphony No. 4 while with the Cincinnati Symphony Orchestra in 1957.

She also headed the Greenacres Foundation, a non-profit organization with the goal of "[preserving] the land for the education and enjoyment of future generations."

She turned 100 in August 2011 and died in July 2012 in Indian Hill, Ohio.
