= Justus Thorner =

German-born American baseball executive

- Born: March 2, 1848; Hanover, Germany
- Died: October 10, 1928 (aged 80); Cincinnati, Ohio
- Occupations: Owner of the Cincinnati Stars (1880); Owner of the Cincinnati Red Stockings (1882–1883); Owner of the Cincinnati Outlaw Reds (1884)
- Awards: Cincinnati Red Stockings: American Association champions (1882)

Justus Thorner (March 2, 1848 – October 10, 1928) was a German-born American businessman, the owner of three professional baseball teams; the Cincinnati Stars in 1880, the Cincinnati Red Stockings during 1882 and 1883, and the Cincinnati Outlaw Reds in 1884.

Thorner was a key figure in the formation of the American Association, which operated from 1882 to 1891. The 1882 Cincinnati Red Stockings season was the initial season of the franchise now known as the Cincinnati Reds.

== Biography ==
In 1880, Thorner owned the Cincinnati Stars in the National League (NL); the team succeeded an early Cincinnati Reds franchise that operated during 1876–1879. The Stars finished in last place in their only season, then were expelled, "for failure to observe the rules, agreements and requirements of the league." While the rest of the owners in the National League wanted changes banning Sunday baseball and beer selling at ballparks, Cincinnati objected, saying too much of the club's revenue would be lost.

The expulsion of the Cincinnati franchise from the National League spurred the creation of the new American Association (AA). Thorner took ownership of the AA's Cincinnati Red Stockings franchise, (Note: This is considered the inception of the modern day Cincinnati Reds franchise.) which in 1882 won that league's first pennant.

After the 1883 season, Thorner was succeeded as owner by Aaron S. Stern. Thorner then became owner of the Cincinnati Outlaw Reds of the Union Association (UA), which only operated in 1884.

A son of Jacob and Rosalia (Baun) Thorner, he was born in 1848 in Hanover, Germany, and emigrated to the United States at a young age. He managed a brewery in Cincinnati, and in part got involved in baseball to help sell beer. Thorner was married; his wife, Pauline, died in March 1917. Eight months later, Thorner was in bankruptcy. Thorner died in Cincinnati on October 10, 1928; he was survived by a son, Bennett, and a daughter, Rose. He is buried in Cincinnati's United Jewish Cemetery.
