= Jim Greengrass =

American baseball player (1927–2019)

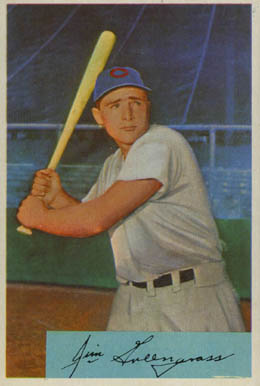
- Outfielder
- Born: October 24, 1927; Addison, New York, U.S.
- Died: September 9, 2019 (aged 91); Chatsworth, Georgia, U.S.
- Batted: Right Threw: Right

MLB debut
- September 9, 1952, for the Cincinnati Reds

Last MLB appearance
- September 30, 1956, for the Philadelphia Phillies

MLB statistics
- Batting average: .269
- Home runs: 69
- Runs batted in: 282
- Stats at Baseball Reference

Teams
- Cincinnati Reds / Redlegs (1952–1955); Philadelphia Phillies (1955–1956)

James Raymond Greengrass (October 24, 1927 – September 9, 2019) was an American professional baseball player. A power-hitting outfielder whose career was hindered by phlebitis, Greengrass appeared in 504 games over five seasons (1952–56) in Major League Baseball (MLB) for the Cincinnati Reds / Redlegs and Philadelphia Phillies. He threw and batted right-handed and was listed as 6 feet 1 inch (1.85 m) tall and 200 pounds (91 kg).

== Baseball career ==
=== Minor leagues ===
Greengrass was born in Addison, New York, and attended Addison High School. In 1944, he signed with the New York Yankees at age 16 during World War II and his early minor league baseball career spanned almost seven full years, including a failed attempt as a pitcher and two years (1946–1947) devoted to military duty. Finally, on August 28, 1952, the pennant-bound Yankees packaged Greengrass, who had spent the season in the Double-A Texas League, three other players and cash in a trade to Cincinnati for the Reds' former All-Star pitcher, Ewell Blackwell.

=== Cincinnati Redlegs ===
Away from the Yankees, Greengrass got his chance to play regularly in the major leagues. That September he started 17 games in the Cincinnati outfield, collected 24 runs batted in with five home runs, and batted .309. The following season, 1953, Greengrass started 153 of the Redlegs' 155 official National League games in left field, hit 20 homers, and with 100 RBI was one of three Redlegs (along with Ted Kluszewski and Gus Bell) to hit the century mark in runs driven in. He finished sixth in NL Rookie of the Year balloting. In 1954 his production fell off slightly, with 139 games played and 95 runs batted in, but Greengrass reached a personal best in home runs (27). Greengrass shares with Pop Dillon the record for the most doubles hit on the opening day of the Major League Baseball season, with his four two-baggers on April 13, 1954.

=== Philadelphia Phillies ===
In 1955, Greengrass collected only four hits in his first 39 at bats through April 29. On the following day, April 30, he was traded to the Phillies in a three-for-three deal, and celebrated his arrival by getting two hits and his first 1955 home run in his Philadelphia debut on May 1. He hit safely in his next five games as a Phillie as well. He eventually leveled off, however, to bat .272 with 12 homers in 94 games (including 79 starts in right field) with the Phillies. However, 1955 was his last good year in the majors. His problems with phlebitis began that season and he struggled through the 1956 campaign, his last year in MLB, hitting .205 with five homers as a backup outfielder.

Greengrass batted .269 lifetime during his big-league service, with his 482 hits including 82 doubles, 16 triples and 69 home runs. Despite his condition, he was able to continue his pro career in the higher levels of minor league baseball into 1961.

== Death ==
Greengrass died in Chatsworth, Georgia, on September 9, 2019.
