= Francis L. Dale =

American business executive, political operative, and baseball team owner

- Dale, c. 1966
- Born: July 13, 1921; Champaign, Illinois, U.S. (Note: Dale's draft registration card of July 1946, which he signed, lists his birthplace as Urbana, Illinois.)
- Died: November 28, 1993 (aged 72); Zimbabwe
- Education: Duke University; University of Virginia
- Occupations: Lawyer, publisher
- Known for: Owner & president of the Cincinnati Reds (1967–1973)
- Political party: Republican
- Military career
- Allegiance: United States of America
- Branch: United States Navy
- Service years: 1943–1946
- Rank: Lieutenant Commander
- Commands: USS Pillsbury
- Conflicts: World War II

Francis Lykins Dale (July 13, 1921 – November 28, 1993) was an American business executive and Republican political operative. He was also owner and president of the Cincinnati Reds for six years, and served as commissioner of the Major Indoor Soccer League for two years. Dale was a commanding officer in the United States Navy during World War II.

== Early life ==
Dale graduated from Duke University and obtained a law degree from the University of Virginia. During World War II, he served in the United States Navy from May 1943 until June 1946. He was a commanding officer of USS Pillsbury, an antisubmarine craft that captured the German submarine U-505, among other exploits.

== Career ==
After returning to civilian life, Dale served as a partner in the Cincinnati law firm of Frost & Jacobs. He was also publisher of The Cincinnati Enquirer from 1965 to 1973. He was the last publisher to preside over the Los Angeles Herald-Examiner.

Dale led an investment group that purchased the Cincinnati Reds for $8 million from Bill DeWitt on December 5, 1966. As team president from 1967 to 1973, Dale was a supporter of building the downtown Riverfront Stadium, the Reds' home when the park opened in 1970. Generally, Dale was a hands-off owner; he left the Reds in the hands of general manager Bob Howsam. Dale sold his interest to minority partner Louis Nippert in 1973.

Dale served on Richard M. Nixon's Citizens Committee to Re-Elect the President during 1971–1972, and was appointed by Nixon to serve as United States representative to the United Nations in Geneva in 1972 with the rank of ambassador.

== Later years ==
During 1985–1986, Dale served as commissioner of the Major Indoor Soccer League (MISL). In 1988, he was awarded an honorary Doctor of Laws (LL.D.) degree from Whittier College. Dale died of a heart attack on November 28, 1993, while visiting Victoria Falls, Zimbabwe. He is buried at Spring Grove Cemetery in Cincinnati.
