= Fred Baczewski =

American baseball player (1926–1976)

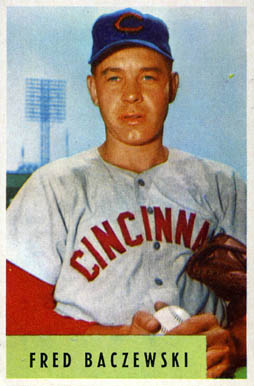
- Pitcher
- Born: May 15, 1926; Saint Paul, Minnesota, U.S.
- Died: November 14, 1976 (aged 50); Culver City, California, U.S.
- Batted: Left Threw: Left

MLB debut
- April 26, 1953, for the Chicago Cubs

Last MLB appearance
- April 16, 1955, for the Cincinnati Redlegs

MLB statistics
- Win–loss record: 17–10
- Earned run average: 4.45
- Strikeouts: 104
- Stats at Baseball Reference

Teams
- Chicago Cubs (1953); Cincinnati Redlegs (1953–1955)

Frederic John "Lefty" Baczewski (May 15, 1926 – November 14, 1976) was an American left-handed pitcher in Major League Baseball for the Cincinnati Redlegs and Chicago Cubs. After some time in the independent minor leagues, Baczewski was purchased from his Shreveport club in October 1949 by the Cubs for $30,000 and a player to be named. He worked his way up through the Cubs' minor league system and made his debut with the parent club on April 26, 1953.

Baczewski appeared in nine games as a reliever, posting an ERA of 6.30 in ten innings, before he was traded with Bob Kelly to the Reds in exchange for Bubba Church. With the Reds, Baczewski was primarily a starter and had a very solid season, sporting an 11–4 record and completing 10 of his 18 starts while recording a solid 3.45 ERA. His winning percentage of .733 was good for sixth in the National League, and his ten complete games also placed in the league's top ten. He had secured his spot in the Reds' starting rotation for the 1954 season.

However, Baczewski's career would stall after his impressive rookie campaign. In 1954, he started 22 of his 29 games but was only able to break even with a 6–6 record as his ERA ballooned to 5.26. In 1955, Baczewski opened the season with the Reds but made just a single relief appearance, allowing 2 runs in one inning on April 16. He would never pitch in the majors again. He died at age 50 in Culver City, California.
