= Paul Schramka =

American baseball player (1928–2019)

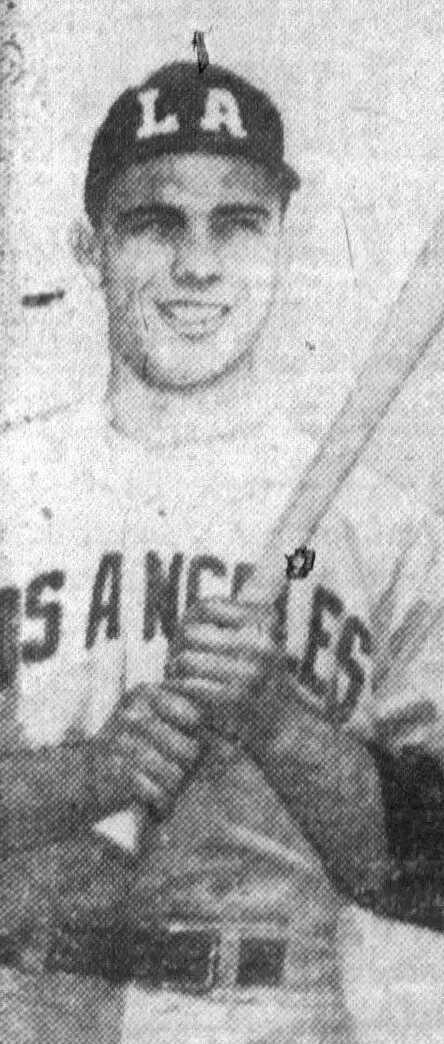
- Schramka, circa 1954
- Pinch runner / Left fielder
- Born: March 22, 1928; Milwaukee, Wisconsin, U.S.
- Died: July 8, 2019 (aged 91); Menomonee Falls, Wisconsin, U.S.
- Batted: Left Threw: Left

MLB debut
- April 14, 1953, for the Chicago Cubs

Last MLB appearance
- April 16, 1953, for the Chicago Cubs

MLB statistics
- Games played: 2
- At bats: 0
- Runs scored: 0
- Stats at Baseball Reference

Teams
- Chicago Cubs (1953)

Paul Edward Schramka (March 22, 1928 – July 8, 2019) was an American professional baseball left fielder in Major League Baseball. Schramka signed as a free agent in 1949 with the Chicago Cubs and played with the team at the Major League level in 1953 before playing minor league ball in the Cubs' system. Later in 1953, future Hall of Famer Ernie Banks joined the Cubs and wore the number vacated by Schramka, number 14.

Schramka was born to parents Eugene and Rose, and had two younger brothers, Gene and Tom. His parents were funeral directors, as was his grandfather, an immigrant of Polish-German descent.

Schramka played collegiate baseball at the University of Notre Dame and the University of San Francisco. Schramka was inducted into the University of San Francisco Sports Hall of Fame in 1973. While playing baseball for the Dons of USF, he was coached by Pete Newell. He served in the 4th Infantry Division during the Korean War from October 1950 to October 1952.

After ending his professional baseball career, Schramka returned to the family business, working as a funeral director in Milwaukee. He died on July 8, 2019.
