= Eddie Erautt =

American baseball player (1924–2013)

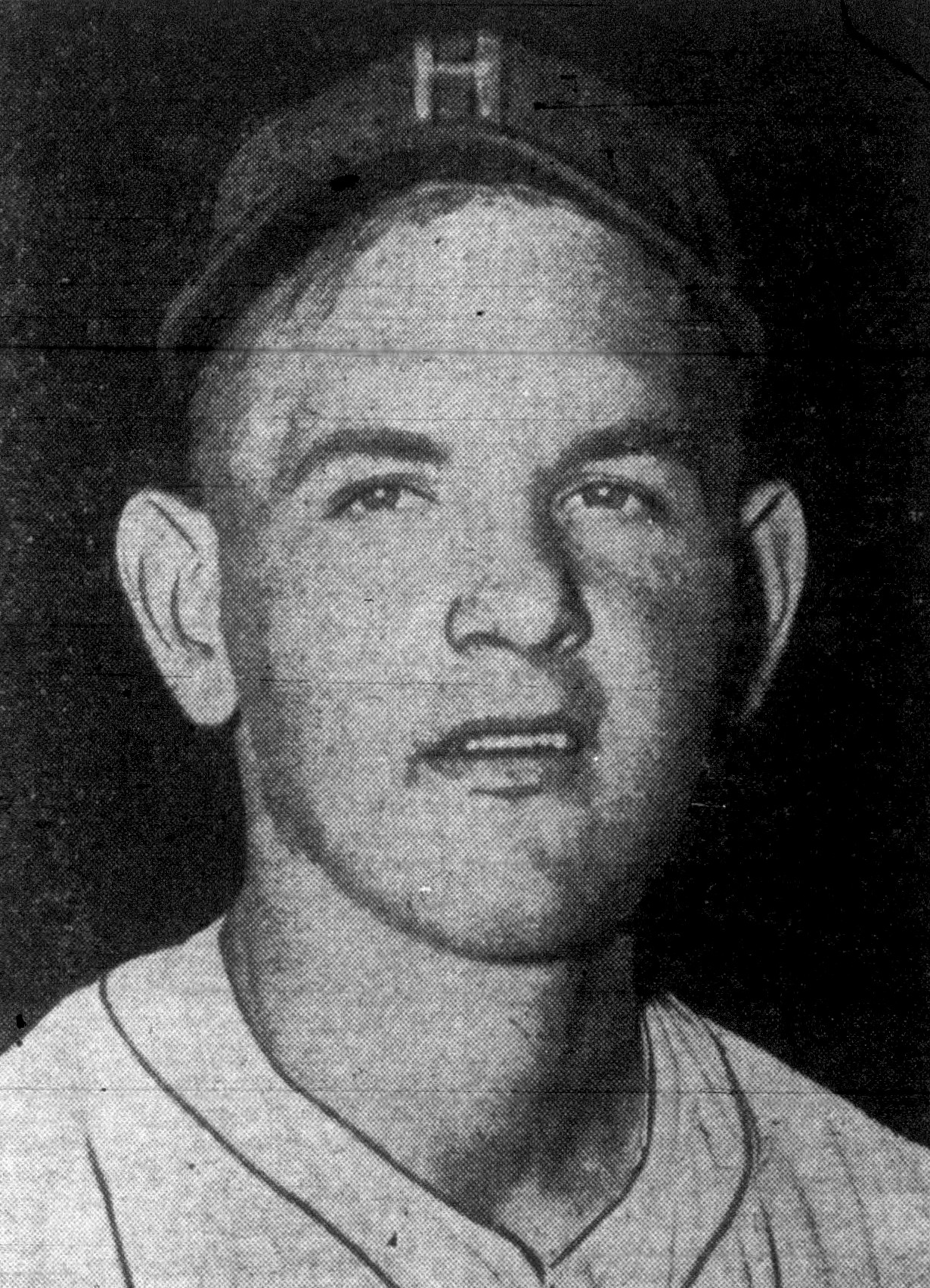
- Erautt, circa 1943
- Pitcher
- Born: September 26, 1924; Portland, Oregon, U.S.
- Died: October 27, 2013 (aged 89); La Mesa, California, U.S.
- Batted: Right Threw: Right

MLB debut
- April 16, 1947, for the Cincinnati Reds

Last MLB appearance
- September 22, 1953, for the St. Louis Cardinals

MLB statistics
- Win–loss record: 15–23
- Earned run average: 4.86
- Strikeouts: 157
- Stats at Baseball Reference

Teams
- Cincinnati Reds / Redlegs (1947–1951, 1953); St. Louis Cardinals (1953)

Edward Lorenz Sebastian Erautt (September 26, 1924 – October 27, 2013) was an American professional baseball player. The right-handed pitcher, listed as 5 feet 11 inches (1.80 m) tall and 185 pounds (84 kg), appeared in 164 games over six seasons in Major League Baseball for the Cincinnati Reds and St. Louis Cardinals (1947–51; 1953).

The younger brother of Major League catcher Joe Erautt, Eddie was born in Portland, Oregon, where he attended Lincoln High School. He began his pro career in his native state, with the Salem Senators in 1942, then pitched in 27 games for the 1942–43 Hollywood Stars of the Pacific Coast League before service in the United States Army during World War II. In his first post-war campaign, he won 20 of 34 decisions for the Stars and was acquired by Cincinnati.

Erautt's best big-league season was 1949, when he allowed 99 hits in 1122/3 innings pitched and compiled an earned run average of 3.36 in 39 games, including nine starts. But he allowed 61 bases on balls to 43 strikeouts. The Reds of Erautt's era were a chronic second-division team and he compiled a poor 12–22 record in 144 total appearances for Cincinnati. As a Cardinal, in 1953, he won three of four decisions, but posted a 6.31 ERA.

All told, Erautt allowed 434 hits and 179 bases on balls in 3792/3 MLB innings pitched for a WHIP of 1.62, with 157 strikeouts.

Erautt was, however, a very successful pitcher in the minor leagues, following up his 20-win 1946 campaign with seasons of 21, 18, 16 and 15 victories. He retired after the 1957 season.
