= Marge Schott =

Major League Baseball owner (1928–2004)

- Born: Margaret Carolyn Unnewehr; August 18, 1928; Cincinnati, Ohio, U.S.
- Died: March 2, 2004 (aged 75); Cincinnati, Ohio, U.S.
- Occupation: Owner of the Cincinnati Reds
- Years active: 1968–1999
- Spouse: Charles J. Schott (m. 1952; died 1968)
- Awards: 1990 World Series Champion

Margaret Carolyn Schott (née Unnewehr; August 18, 1928 – March 2, 2004) was an American baseball executive. Serving as managing general partner, president and CEO of Major League Baseball's Cincinnati Reds franchise from 1984 to 1999, she was the second woman to own a North American major-league team without inheriting it, after New York Mets founder Joan Whitney Payson.

She was banned from serving as the team's managing general partner by MLB in 1993 due to racist comments and again from 1996 through 1998 for stating that Adolf Hitler was initially good for Germany. Shortly afterwards, she sold the majority of her share in the team.

== Early life and career ==
Schott was born in Cincinnati, one of five daughters of Edward Henry Unnewehr and Charlotte (Sauerland). Her father grew wealthy in the lumber business. Both of her parents were of German descent, with her mother having immigrated via Ellis Island in 1923. Her mother's sister had five sons who fought for Germany in World War II.

She attended parochial schools and graduated from the Sacred Heart Academy. While a student at the University of Cincinnati, Marge Schott became a member of Theta Phi Alpha sorority. She married Charles Schott, a member of a wealthy Cincinnati family, in 1952, and inherited his automobile dealerships and interests in other industries when he died of a heart attack in 1968. A widow at 39, Marge Schott never remarried and had no children of her own.

== Cincinnati Reds ==
Schott had been a Reds fan for most of her life; from 1963 onward, she held an auction to raise money for the Cincinnati Children's Hospital, attended by several Reds players. In 1981, Schott bought a minority interest in the Reds as part of a group headed by insurance magnates William and James Williams. On December 21, 1984, she purchased a controlling interest for a reported $11M, making her managing general partner, and becoming the first woman to buy an MLB team. In 1985, she was named president and CEO of the club. Five years later, the Reds won the World Series, when they swept the Oakland Athletics.

Schott quickly became one of baseball's most publicly visible owners. The Reds had long been a family-oriented franchise, and fans praised her efforts to keep ticket and concession prices low. For instance, she kept the price of the basic hot dog at one dollar (equivalent to $2.05 in 2025), and kept box seats around $12 (equivalent to $25 in 2025) – the cheapest in baseball. Unlike most owners, she sat in a regular box seat at Riverfront Stadium, and often signed autographs. She often allowed groups of children on the field to run to deep center field and back before the games would start, due to her love for children stemming from her inability to have any of her own. She was also noted for always having Schottzie, her pet Saint Bernard, with her.

On the debit side, Schott was criticized for not spending the money it would have taken to build the Reds into contenders. This "cheap" attitude was sometimes conveyed in her own statements. She would publicly comment on occasion about having to pay players while they were on the disabled list, notably World Series hero José Rijo (who had an elbow injury), about whom she once complained of "paying three million dollars to sit on his butt." She also maintained one of the smallest and lowest paid front office staffs in the major leagues.

In addition, it was revealed Schott was far from happy about the team winning the 1990 World Series in a four-game sweep. She believed team owners made the most money from a World Series once it reached a Game 5, 6, or 7, thus robbing her of major revenue. She fussed and refused to pay for any post-game celebration for the team. The players reportedly resorted to celebrating on their own.

Lou Piniella, the champion manager of the team, left in 1992 partly after Schott refused to back him in any way when he was sued by umpire Gary Darling for defamation (he had to get his own lawyer).

In fifteen seasons of ownership under Schott, the Reds compiled a regular season record of 1,300–1,226 (.514) with 2 playoff appearances and a playoff record of 11–6 (.647) for a lifetime record of 1,311–1,232 (.515) under 7 different managers. The Reds had nine winning seasons, 1 .500 season, and 4 losing seasons. However, they only qualified for the playoffs twice, winning the 1990 World Series and advancing to the National League Championship Series in 1995, which they lost in a 4-game sweep to the Atlanta Braves. The Reds also finished the 1999 season tied with the New York Mets for the final Wild Card spot in the National League, but they lost a one-game playoff tiebreaker game to the Mets at Cinergy Field.

== Controversies ==
=== Racism and white nationalist views ===
On November 13, 1992, Charles "Cal" Levy, a former marketing director for the Reds, stated in a deposition for Tim Sabo, a former employee who was suing the team, that he had heard Schott refer to then-Reds outfielders Eric Davis and Dave Parker as "million-dollar niggers." Sabo, who had been the team's controller, alleged that his 1991 firing was due to testifying against Schott in another lawsuit brought against Schott by several limited partners and because he opposed the unwritten policy of not hiring blacks. Schott's countersuit alleged that Sabo wrote unauthorized checks to himself and paid health insurance premiums to retired front-office employees. She asked for $25,000 in damages for defamation. Sabo ultimately lost his suit.

Levy, who is Jewish, alleged that Schott kept a Nazi swastika armband at her home and claims he overheard her say "sneaky goddamn Jews are all alike." The next day, Schott issued a statement saying the claims of racism levied against her were overstated and that she did not mean to offend anyone with her statement or her ownership of the armband. Schott explained that the swastika armband had been a gift from a former employee.

On November 29, Schott said the "million-dollar niggers" comment was made in jest, but then stated that she felt that Adolf Hitler was initially good for Germany and did not understand how the epithet "Jap" could be offensive.

During the same season, a former Oakland Athletics executive assistant, Sharon Jones, was quoted in The New York Times as having overheard Schott state: "I would never hire another nigger. I'd rather have a trained monkey working for me than a nigger," before the start of an owners' conference call.

On May 5, 1996, Schott aroused ire when she made statements favorable of Adolf Hitler, saying "Everything you read, when he came in he was good. They built tremendous highways and got all the factories going. He went nuts, he went berserk. I think his own generals tried to kill him, didn't they?" Later in the month, Schott was quoted in Sports Illustrated as speaking in a "cartoonish Japanese accent" while describing her meeting with the Prime Minister of Japan. Schott later stated that she did not like Asian kids "outdoing our kids" in high school.

=== Other criticisms and controversies ===
Schott was the target of frequent criticism for allegedly allowing her ever-present St. Bernards, Schottzie and Schottzie 02, near-complete free rein of Riverfront Stadium, including their defecating on the field. In particular, Reds personnel had also complained of her dogs' hair frequently getting stuck on their uniforms; Schott believed this was a good-luck charm, and during their 1990 World Series run would send bags of his hair to the team facilities. The hair was so old it began to smell. When the original Schottzie died, he was buried in Schott's backyard, wearing a Reds hat.

Schott was known for not wanting to hire scouts, stating that "All they do is sit around and watch ball games," and, for the opening week of the 1996 season, refusing to post scores of other games on the Riverfront Stadium scoreboard (the cost of this service was $350 a month). Schott reportedly said of the scoreboard issue, "Why do [fans] care about one game when they're watching another?"

On September 21, 1989, professional wrestler Randy Savage (in his "Macho Man" gimmick), was invited by Reds broadcaster Marty Brennaman to join him in the booth. Prior to his wrestling career, Savage was a minor league baseball player who played for Tampa Tarpons (a Reds farm team). He joined Brennaman during the third inning, in an 11–7 loss to the San Diego Padres, which garnered attention from players, umpires and fans in attendance. A furious Schott wanted Savage off the air and sent a message via her nephew Stephen H. Schott and the radio producer to Brennaman threatening to fire him. Brennaman cornered the younger Schott off the air, telling him: "Don't you ever try to intimidate me again. And if you have something to say, say it yourself". Reds center fielder Eric Davis also criticised the decision to have Savage ejected from the game, saying:

"Macho Man is a celebrity. If a celebrity can't go in the booth, who can? If it had been somebody from pet control Schott wouldn't have minded. They shoulda paid him to come to the game. She says she wants to entertain the fans and then she deprives them of this? That's the most excitement we've given the fans in two months."

On May 18, 1994, during a speech before the Ohio County Treasurers Association, Schott commented that she did not want her players to wear earrings because "only fruits wear earrings." She said, "I was raised to believe that men wearing earrings are fruity." Up to 1999, the Reds had a long-standing rule prohibiting players from having facial hair. In 1985, Schott famously offered future Hall of Famer Rollie Fingers to play for the Reds, on the condition that Fingers would shave off his famous handlebar mustache. Fingers supposedly responded that he would shave his mustache "when (Schott) shaves her Saint Bernard." The rule was rescinded in 1999 (shortly before she relinquished control of the Reds) after a discussion between Schott and newly acquired outfielder Greg Vaughn.

In 1995, Schott famously announced in the middle of the season that manager Davey Johnson would not return, regardless of how well the Reds did. By all accounts, this was because of a personality clash between Johnson and Schott. They had never gotten along during parts of three seasons together, with their relationship being described as dysfunctional, featuring strained communication and, from Johnson specifically, notes from her as if they were written by her St. Bernard. Their relationship deteriorated to the point that Johnson was almost fired after the 1994 season even though the Reds were leading the NL Central at the time of the strike. Most notably, Schott did not approve of Johnson living with his fiancée before they were married later in the year. The Reds won the division and made it all the way to the National League Championship Series, where they were swept by the eventual World Series champion Atlanta Braves, after which he was fired and replaced by 3rd base coach Ray Knight. The Reds' 1995 NLDS win over the Los Angeles Dodgers in that same postseason remains their most recent postseason series win to date, as the Reds have made the postseason five additional times since 1995, only to be eliminated in the first round on each occasion. It was also the last playoff appearance for Cincinnati until 2010.

Being the birthplace of Major League Baseball, the Reds traditionally play the first game of the season at home. On April 1, 1996, they played the Montreal Expos. The weather was cold and blustery and it had snowed earlier in the day. Shortly after the game started, home plate umpire John McSherry called a time out and motioned towards the Reds dugout, it was later presumed, for medical attention. After taking just a few steps, McSherry collapsed and fell to the artificial turf face first. Attempts to resuscitate McSherry failed and he was pronounced dead on arrival at University Hospital about an hour later. The other umpires decided to postpone the game until the next day. Video showed Schott visibly upset that the game was to be postponed; reportedly she groused, "Snow this morning and now this. I don't believe it. I feel cheated. This isn't supposed to happen to us, not in Cincinnati. This is our history, our tradition, our team. Nobody feels worse than me." Schott later insisted that she was standing up for the fans, though critics saw her comments as highly insensitive and grossly inappropriate. During the team's next homestand, Schott attempted to smooth over her feud with the umpires by apologizing to the crew—despite none of them having been in attendance at the game in question—only to have them refuse the gesture.

At an unknown time on an airplane, Schott was allegedly approached by a woman who introduced herself as Edd Roush's granddaughter. Schott then replied, "That's nice hon, what business is he in?" Roush is a Hall of Fame center fielder who had many of his greatest years with the Reds. The New York Times later dubbed her "Baseball's Big Red Headache", and Sports Illustrated would dub her as a "Red Menace".

=== Sanctions and forced retirement ===
Due to Schott's racist comments, a four-man committee was convened to investigate Schott. On February 3, 1993, she was fined $250,000 and banned from day-to-day operations of the Reds for the 1993 season. Jim Bowden took over as managing partner. Schott returned to work on November 1.

Schott's comments about Hitler led MLB to ban Schott from day-to-day operations through 1998. On April 20, 1999, Schott agreed to sell her controlling interest in the Reds for $67 million to a group led by Cincinnati businessman Carl Lindner. At the time she was facing a third suspension and failing health. Additionally, the limited partners were planning to vote her out at the end of the ownership agreement. The deal was approved on September 15; Schott remained as a minority partner.

== Philanthropy ==
In addition to her interest in the Reds, Schott was a major contributor to charitable organizations in Cincinnati including the Cincinnati Children's Hospital Medical Center and Cincinnati Zoo, where they named an Asian elephant, Schottzie, after her dog. A second Asian elephant, named Princess Schottzie II, was donated by Schott in 1996. She is also recognized for her major donation to the Boy Scouts' Camp Friedlander that was used to create an 18-acre (7.3 ha) lake, christened 'Lake Marge Schott' in her honor.

Except for several million bequeathed to relatives and friends, Schott left nearly the entirety of her $124 million estate to charity.

Schott was a generous contributor to the University of Cincinnati. From 2006 to 2020, UC's baseball stadium was named the Marge Schott Stadium in her honor. In June 2020, the university's board of trustees voted to remove her name from the stadium, citing her record of racism and bigotry, and renamed it UC Baseball Stadium.

== Illness and death ==
Schott was a long-time smoker; in 2001 she began to develop health problems. Schott was hospitalized twice for breathing problems and suffered from pneumonia in 2003. Schott was hospitalized again on February 9, 2004. Some reports claim she was hospitalized due to a cold, while others said she complained of knee ailments; regardless, during her stay she developed breathing problems and had to be put on life support. She died on March 2 at age 75 at the Christ Hospital, in Cincinnati.

Schott's funeral was held at All Saints Catholic Church, in the Cincinnati suburb of Kenwood. She is interred at Gate of Heaven Cemetery wearing her signature red suit with an elephant brooch.

== See also ==
- Women in baseball
- List of Cincinnati Reds owners and executives
- List of female Major League Baseball principal owners
- List of people banned from Major League Baseball
