= Ernie Nevel =

American baseball player (1918-1988)

- Pitcher
- Born: August 17, 1919; Charleston, Missouri
- Died: July 10, 1988 (aged 68); Springfield, Missouri
- Batted: Right Threw: Right

MLB debut
- September 26, 1950, for the New York Yankees

Last MLB appearance
- May 30, 1953, for the Cincinnati Redlegs

MLB statistics
- Win–loss record: 0–1
- Earned run average: 6.10
- Strikeouts: 9
- Innings pitched: 20 2/3
- Stats at Baseball Reference

Teams
- New York Yankees (1950–1951); Cincinnati Redlegs (1953)

Ernie Wyre Nevel (August 17, 1919 – July 10, 1988) was an American Major League Baseball pitcher who played in 1950 and 1951 with the New York Yankees and in 1953 with the Cincinnati Redlegs. Born in Charleston, Missouri, he batted and threw right-handed, stood 5 feet 11 inches (1.80 m) tall and weighed 190 pounds (86 kg).

Nevel had a 0–1 record, with a 6.10 ERA, in 14 games pitched as a big leaguer. In 20 2/3 innings pitched, he allowed 27 hits and eight bases on balls, with nine strikeouts to his credit. Of his 14 appearances, one came as a starting pitcher. With the Yankees having already clinched the 1950 American League pennant, Nevel started the final game of the regular season on Sunday, October 1, against the third-place Boston Red Sox at Fenway Park. He allowed four hits and four earned runs in three innings of work, and took the loss, his only decision in Major League Baseball. On August 28, 1952, while he was on the roster of the Triple-A Kansas City Blues, he was one of four players (and $35,000 in cash) shipped to Cincinnati for former star hurler Ewell Blackwell, acquired by the Yankees for the pennant drive.

Twenty-six years old when he first broke into professional baseball, Nevel concluded a nine-year pro career in 1954. He died in Springfield, Missouri, at the age of 69.
