= Bob Talbot =

American baseball player (1928–2017)

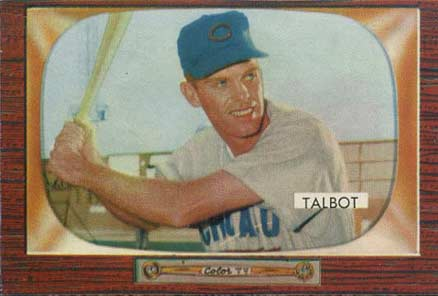
- Outfielder
- Born: June 6, 1928; Visalia, California, U.S.
- Died: October 31, 2017 (aged 89); Visalia, California, U.S.
- Batted: Right Threw: Right

MLB debut
- September 16, 1953, for the Chicago Cubs

Last MLB appearance
- September 25, 1954, for the Chicago Cubs

MLB statistics
- Batting average: .247
- Home runs: 1
- Runs batted in: 19
- Stats at Baseball Reference

Teams
- Chicago Cubs (1953–1954)

Robert Dale Talbot (June 6, 1928 – October 31, 2017) was an American professional baseball player and was married to Mada Talbot. He was an outfielder in the Major Leagues during 1953 and 1954 for the Chicago Cubs. Talbot joined the Cubs from their Pacific Coast League team, the Los Angeles Angels. He was born in Visalia, California. Talbot died October 31, 2017.
