= William Williams (baseball) =

American businessman (1916–2009)

Williams

William Joseph Williams, Sr. (1916 – August 23, 2009) was the co-owner of the Cincinnati Reds baseball team of the National League from 1981 through 1984 with his brother James Williams. They sold the Reds to Marge Schott in 1984.

Williams was a part owner of the Cincinnati Bengals from the team's founding in 1968 until his death.

Before baseball, Williams was chairman of Western & Southern Life Insurance Company, co-founded by his father in 1888. He joined the family firm in 1939 and was on the firm's board of directors from 1954 to 1984. For a brief break, Williams was president of North American Management and Development Company. He returned to Western & Southern as president and COO and then as president and CEO.

Williams graduated from Georgetown University in 1939.

In 2006, his sons William Joseph Williams Jr. and Thomas L. Williams teamed up with a group to obtain controlling interest in the Reds.
