= Preston Ward =

American baseball player (1927–2013)

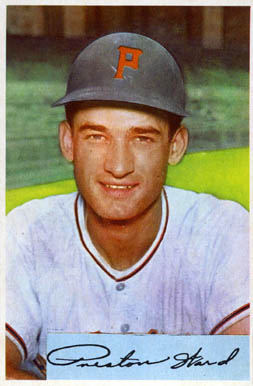
- First baseman
- Born: July 24, 1927; Columbia, Missouri, U.S.
- Died: June 2, 2013 (aged 85); Las Vegas, Nevada, U.S.
- Batted: Left Threw: Right

MLB debut
- April 20, 1948, for the Brooklyn Dodgers

Last MLB appearance
- August 18, 1959, for the Kansas City Athletics

MLB statistics
- Batting average: .253
- Home runs: 50
- Runs batted in: 262
- Stats at Baseball Reference

Teams
- Brooklyn Dodgers (1948); Chicago Cubs (1950, 1953); Pittsburgh Pirates (1953–1956); Cleveland Indians (1956–1958); Kansas City Athletics (1958–1959)

Preston Meyer Ward (July 24, 1927 – June 2, 2013) was an American professional baseball first baseman who appeared in 744 games over nine seasons in Major League Baseball (MLB) between 1948 and 1959 for the Brooklyn Dodgers, Chicago Cubs, Pittsburgh Pirates, Cleveland Indians and Kansas City Athletics. Ward was born in Columbia, Missouri, and attended Missouri State University. He threw right-handed, batted left-handed, and was listed as 6 feet 4 inches (1.93 m) tall and 190 pounds (86 kg). His professional career began in the Brooklyn farm system in 1944 when he was 16 years old.

Ward got opportunities in the major leagues in both 1948 and 1950, then he missed the 1951–1952 seasons while serving in the military during the Korean War, before finally "sticking" in 1953. Over the course of his MLB tenure, he became a utilityman and platoon player, seeing most of his action as a first baseman (438 games at first base vs. 95 in the outfield and 74 at third base). He batted .253 lifetime, while the league average for his era was .269. He collected 522 career hits, with 83 doubles, 15 triples, 50 home runs and 262 runs batted in. His highest seasonal home run total was 12, and his highest RBI total was 48. In 1958 Ward batted .284 with 118 hits in a season split between the Indians and Athletics.

Ward was drafted by the St. Louis Bombers of the Basketball Association of America in 1949 out of Missouri State, but never played for them.
