= James Williams (baseball) =

Baseball owner

James R. Williams
- Occupation: baseball executive
- Years active: 1981–1984
- Known for: co-owner, Cincinnati Reds baseball team
- Relatives: William Williams (co-owner)

James R. Williams was an American baseball executive. He was the co-owner of the Cincinnati Reds baseball team of the National League from 1981 through 1984 with his brother William Williams. They sold the Reds to Marge Schott in 1984.
