= 1960 Philadelphia Phillies season =

Major League Baseball season

1960 Philadelphia Phillies
- League: National League
- Ballpark: Connie Mack Stadium
- City: Philadelphia
- Record: 59–95 (.383)
- League place: 8th
- Owners: R. R. M. Carpenter, Jr.
- General managers: John J. Quinn
- Managers: Eddie Sawyer, Gene Mauch
- Television: WFIL
- Radio: WFIL (By Saam, Claude Haring, Frank Sims)

The 1960 Philadelphia Phillies season was the 78th in franchise history. The team finished in eighth place in the National League with a record of 59–95, 36 games behind the NL and World Series Champion Pittsburgh Pirates.

== Offseason ==
- November 30, 1959: Clay Dalrymple was drafted by the Phillies from the Milwaukee Braves in the 1959 rule 5 draft.
- December 4, 1959: Carl Sawatski was traded by the Phillies to the St. Louis Cardinals for Bill Smith and Bob Smith.
- December 5, 1959: Chico Fernández and Ray Semproch were traded by the Phillies to the Detroit Tigers for Ted Lepcio, Ken Walters and Alex Cosmidis (minors).
- December 9, 1959: Gene Freese was traded by the Phillies to the Chicago White Sox for Johnny Callison.
- March 1960: Jim Bolger was purchased from the Phillies by the Milwaukee Braves.

== Regular season ==
Manager Eddie Sawyer abruptly resigned after the season opener. The Phillies hired Gene Mauch as his replacement, but coach Andy Cohen managed one game before Mauch could join the team from the Minneapolis Millers, leading the Phillies to a 5–4 win in ten innings over the Milwaukee Braves. This was the only game Cohen ever managed in the major leagues, leaving him with a perfect record as a manager.

=== Season standings ===
National League
Team	W	L	Pct.	GB	Home	Road
Pittsburgh Pirates	95	59	.617	—	52‍–‍25	43‍–‍34
Milwaukee Braves	88	66	.571	7	51‍–‍26	37‍–‍40
St. Louis Cardinals	86	68	.558	9	51‍–‍26	35‍–‍42
Los Angeles Dodgers	82	72	.532	13	42‍–‍35	40‍–‍37
San Francisco Giants	79	75	.513	16	45‍–‍32	34‍–‍43
Cincinnati Reds	67	87	.435	28	37‍–‍40	30‍–‍47
Chicago Cubs	60	94	.390	35	33‍–‍44	27‍–‍50
Philadelphia Phillies	59	95	.383	36	31‍–‍46	28‍–‍49

=== Record vs. opponents ===
1960 National League record Sources:
Team	CHC	CIN	LAD	MIL	PHI	PIT	SF	STL
Chicago	—	10–12	9–13	7–15	10–12	7–15	9–13–1	8–14–1
Cincinnati	12–10	—	12–10	9–13	9–13	6–16	11–11	8–14
Los Angeles	13–9	10–12	—	12–10	16–6	11–11	10–12	10–12
Milwaukee	15–7	13–9	10–12	—	16–6	9–13	14–8	11–11
Philadelphia	12–10	13–9	6–16	6–16	—	7–15	8–14	7–15
Pittsburgh	15–7	16–6	11–11	13–9	15–7	—	14–8–1	11–11
San Francisco	13–9–1	11–11	12–10	8–14	14–8	8–14–1	—	13–9
St. Louis	14–8–1	14–8	12–10	11–11	15–7	11–11	9–13	—

=== Notable transactions ===
- May 12, 1960: Dave Philley was purchased from the Phillies by the San Francisco Giants.
- May 13, 1960: Don Cardwell and Ed Bouchee were traded by the Phillies to the Chicago Cubs for Tony Taylor and Cal Neeman.
- June 15, 1960: Wally Post, Harry Anderson, and Fred Hopke (minors) were traded by the Phillies to the Cincinnati Reds for Tony González and Lee Walls.
- July 16, 1960: Costen Shockley was signed as an amateur free agent by the Phillies.
- September 13, 1960: Mike Marshall was signed as an amateur free agent by the Phillies.
- September 21, 1960: Adolfo Phillips was signed as an amateur free agent by the Phillies.

=== Game log ===
Legend
	Phillies win
	Phillies loss
	Postponement
**Bold**	Phillies team member

1960 Game Log
Overall Record: 59–95
April (5–9)

#	Date	Opponent	Score	Win	Loss	Save	Attendance	Record
1	April 12	@ Reds	4–9	Brooks Lawrence (1–0)	**Robin Roberts** (0–1)	Bill Henry (1)	30,075	0–1
2	April 14	Braves	5–4 (10)	**Don Cardwell** (1–0)	Juan Pizarro (0–1)	None	32,038	1–1
3	April 16	Braves	3–13	Lew Burdette (1–0)	**John Buzhardt** (0–1)	None	9,077	1–2
4	April 17	Braves	4–8	Bob Buhl (1–0)	**Robin Roberts** (0–2)	None	6,632	1–3
5	April 19	@ Pirates	4–3	**Jim Owens** (1–0)	Harvey Haddix (0–1)	None	11,443	2–3
6	April 20	@ Pirates	2–4	Vern Law (2–0)	**Don Cardwell** (1–1)	None	10,403	2–4
7	April 21	@ Pirates	5–11	Fred Green (1–0)	**Humberto Robinson** (0–1)	Roy Face (1)	9,451	2–5
8	April 22	Reds	10–7	**Robin Roberts** (1–2)	Jay Hook (1–1)	**Rubén Gómez** (1)	12,254	3–5
9	April 23	Reds	3–2 (13)	**Turk Farrell** (1–0)	Bill Henry (0–1)	None	5,168	4–5
10	April 24 (1)	Reds	9–5	**Chris Short** (1–0)	Bob Purkey (0–1)	**Turk Farrell** (1)	see 2nd game	5–5
11	April 24 (2)	Reds	4–10	Don Newcombe (1–0)	**Jim Owens** (1–1)	Jim Brosnan (1)	19,873	5–6
–	April 26	Pirates	Postponed (rain); Makeup: July 8 as a traditional double-header					
12	April 27	Pirates	2–3	Vern Law (3–0)	**Jack Meyer** (0–1)	None	9,233	5–7
13	April 28	Pirates	0–3	Bob Friend (3–0)	**John Buzhardt** (0–2)	None	8,789	5–8
14	April 29	@ Braves	3–5	Juan Pizarro (1–1)	**Jim Owens** (1–2)	Warren Spahn (1)	12,480	5–9
–	April 30	@ Braves	Postponed (rain); Makeup: August 18					

May (9–18)

#	Date	Opponent	Score	Win	Loss	Save	Attendance	Record
15	May 1	@ Braves	4–5	Lew Burdette (2–1)	**Don Cardwell** (1–2)	Don McMahon (1)	17,884	5–10
16	May 2	@ Cubs	7–8	Ben Johnson (1–1)	**Humberto Robinson** (0–2)	None	2,807	5–11
17	May 3	@ Cubs	10–9	**Jack Meyer** (1–1)	Glen Hobbie (2–2)	**Turk Farrell** (2)	3,046	6–11
18	May 4	@ Cardinals	3–5	Marshall Bridges (2–0)	**John Buzhardt** (0–3)	Lindy McDaniel (4)	6,226	6–12
19	May 5	@ Cardinals	3–1	**Jim Owens** (2–2)	Vinegar Bend Mizell (1–2)	None	7,812	7–12
20	May 6	@ Dodgers	6–1 (10)	**Turk Farrell** (2–0)	Sandy Koufax (0–2)	None	20,165	8–12
21	May 7	@ Dodgers	2–3 (11)	Larry Sherry (3–3)	**Rubén Gómez** (0–1)	None	24,082	8–13
22	May 8	@ Dodgers	4–2	**Jack Meyer** (2–1)	Ed Rakow (0–1)	**Turk Farrell** (3)	20,756	9–13
23	May 10	@ Giants	2–4	Stu Miller (1–1)	**Gene Conley** (0–1)	Billy O'Dell (1)	20,304	9–14
24	May 11	@ Giants	0–1	Sam Jones (4–2)	**Jim Owens** (2–3)	None	11,447	9–15
25	May 12	@ Giants	0–1	Jack Sanford (3–1)	**Robin Roberts** (1–3)	None	10,849	9–16
26	May 13	@ Reds	0–1	Jim O'Toole (3–2)	**Rubén Gómez** (0–2)	None	6,787	9–17
27	May 14	@ Reds	5–2	**Jack Meyer** (3–1)	Jay Hook (3–3)	**Turk Farrell** (4)	4,239	10–17
28	May 15 (1)	@ Reds	14–3	**Gene Conley** (1–1)	Cal McLish (2–3)	None	see 2nd game	11–17
29	May 15 (2)	@ Reds	1–5	Don Newcombe (2–1)	**Humberto Robinson** (0–3)	Bill Henry (6)	17,860	11–18
30	May 16	Cardinals	3–5	Ernie Broglio (1–1)	**Jim Owens** (2–4)	None	11,321	11–19
–	May 17	Cardinals	Postponed (rain); Makeup: August 9 as a traditional double-header					
–	May 18	Cubs	Postponed (rain); Makeup: June 21 as a traditional double-header					
31	May 19	Cubs	2–4	Bob Anderson (1–1)	**Robin Roberts** (1–4)	None	12,297	11–20
32	May 20	Dodgers	6–3	**Gene Conley** (2–1)	Johnny Podres (2–4)	None	18,681	12–20
–	May 21	Dodgers	Postponed (rain); Makeup: June 29 as a traditional double-header					
33	May 22	Dodgers	6–9	Ed Roebuck (2–1)	**Rubén Gómez** (0–3)	Don Drysdale (1)	12,780	12–21
34	May 24	Giants	0–4	Sam Jones (5–3)	**Jim Owens** (2–5)	None	20,529	12–22
35	May 25	Giants	1–5 (8)	Mike McCormick (6–2)	**Robin Roberts** (1–5)	None	17,713	12–23
36	May 26	Giants	0–9	Jack Sanford (5–1)	**Gene Conley** (2–2)	None	14,386	12–24
–	May 27	@ Pirates	Postponed (rain); Makeup: August 16 as a traditional double-header					
37	May 28	@ Pirates	2–4 (13)	Jim Umbricht (1–2)	**Turk Farrell** (2–1)	None	9,476	12–25
38	May 29	@ Pirates	5–8	Vern Law (7–1)	**Robin Roberts** (1–6)	Fred Green (2)	15,704	12–26
39	May 30 (1)	Reds	4–5 (10)	Jim Brosnan (3–0)	**Gene Conley** (2–3)	Bob Grim (1)	see 2nd game	12–27
40	May 30 (2)	Reds	6–1	**John Buzhardt** (1–3)	Don Newcombe (3–2)	None	20,323	13–27
41	May 31	Braves	12–7	**Chris Short** (2–0)	Lew Burdette (3–2)	**Turk Farrell** (5)	8,155	14–27

June (14–15)

#	Date	Opponent	Score	Win	Loss	Save	Attendance	Record
42	June 1	Braves	3–6	Bob Buhl (4–2)	**Robin Roberts** (1–7)	None	10,682	14–28
43	June 2	Braves	8–9	Warren Spahn (3–2)	**Taylor Phillips** (0–1)	Bob Rush (1)	10,002	14–29
44	June 3	Pirates	0–3	Vern Law (8–1)	**John Buzhardt** (1–4)	None	16,738	14–30
–	June 4	Pirates	Postponed (rain); Makeup: September 20 as a traditional double-header					
45	June 5 (1)	Pirates	2–0	**Gene Conley** (3–3)	Bob Friend (6–3)	None	see 2nd game	15–30
46	June 5 (2)	Pirates	4–1	**Jim Owens** (3–5)	Harvey Haddix (3–2)	None	23,410	16–30
47	June 6	@ Cardinals	2–5	Larry Jackson (7–5)	**Chris Short** (2–1)	None	9,908	16–31
48	June 7	@ Cardinals	5–3	**Robin Roberts** (2–7)	Bob Miller (2–1)	**Turk Farrell** (6)	9,635	17–31
49	June 8	@ Cardinals	5–4	**John Buzhardt** (2–4)	Lindy McDaniel (3–3)	None	8,263	18–31
50	June 10	@ Cubs	1–6	Mark Freeman (1–0)	**Jim Owens** (3–6)	None	5,077	18–32
51	June 11	@ Cubs	7–1	**Chris Short** (3–1)	Dick Ellsworth (3–3)	None	13,166	19–32
52	June 12	@ Cubs	7–8 (10)	Mark Freeman (2–0)	**Humberto Robinson** (0–4)	None	8,481	19–33
53	June 14	@ Dodgers	6–5 (10)	**Turk Farrell** (3–1)	Clem Labine (0–1)	None	18,031	20–33
54	June 15	@ Dodgers	2–14	Sandy Koufax (2–8)	**Jim Owens** (3–7)	None	13,295	20–34
55	June 16	@ Dodgers	6–10	Johnny Podres (6–5)	**John Buzhardt** (2–5)	Ed Roebuck (2)	19,573	20–35
56	June 17	@ Giants	3–7	Mike McCormick (8–3)	**Chris Short** (3–2)	Billy Loes (3)	20,952	20–36
57	June 18	@ Giants	4–7	Sam Jones (9–5)	**Dallas Green** (0–1)	Johnny Antonelli (2)	19,494	20–37
58	June 19	@ Giants	2–1 (11)	**Robin Roberts** (3–7)	Jack Sanford (6–4)	None	32,159	21–37
59	June 21 (1)	Cubs	7–6 (13)	**Turk Farrell** (4–1)	Glen Hobbie (6–9)	None	see 2nd game	22–37
60	June 21 (2)	Cubs	7–6^{^{[a]}^{[b]}}	**John Buzhardt** (3–5)	Joe Schaffernoth (0–2)	**Robin Roberts** (1)	26,233	23–37
61	June 22	Cubs	6–3	**Chris Short** (4–2)	Bob Anderson (2–3)	None	9,342	24–37
62	June 23	Cubs	4–3	**Turk Farrell** (5–1)	Seth Morehead (0–6)	None	8,144	25–37
63	June 24	Cardinals	4–3	**Robin Roberts** (4–7)	Ernie Broglio (5–3)	None	14,489	26–37
64	June 25	Cardinals	0–1	Curt Simmons (1–0)	**Jim Owens** (3–8)	Lindy McDaniel (13)	7,660	26–38
65	June 26 (1)	Cardinals	3–2 (12)	**John Buzhardt** (4–5)	Ernie Broglio (5–4)	None	see 2nd game	27–38
66	June 26 (2)	Cardinals	3–4	Ernie Broglio (6–4)	**Chris Short** (4–3)	None	19,998	27–39
67	June 28	Dodgers	2–0	**Dallas Green** (1–1)	Stan Williams (6–2)	None	22,775	28–39
68	June 29 (1)	Dodgers	3–6	Larry Sherry (6–4)	**Turk Farrell** (5–2)	None	see 2nd game	28–40
69	June 29 (2)	Dodgers	2–5	Sandy Koufax (3–8)	**Gene Conley** (3–4)	Ed Roebuck (3)	25,572	28–41
70	June 30	Dodgers	6–10	Ed Roebuck (5–1)	**Jim Owens** (3–9)	None	20,859	28–42

July (10–17)

#	Date	Opponent	Score	Win	Loss	Save	Attendance	Record
–	July 1	Giants	Postponed (rain); Makeup: August 2 as a traditional double-header					
71	July 2	Giants	3–2 (11)	**Turk Farrell** (6–2)	Mike McCormick (9–4)	None	20,647	29–42
72	July 3	Giants	5–11	Sam Jones (10–7)	**Chris Short** (4–4)	Mike McCormick (2)	15,700	29–43
73	July 4 (1)	@ Reds	0–5	Jay Hook (7–7)	**Dallas Green** (1–2)	None	see 2nd game	29–44
74	July 4 (2)	@ Reds	5–2	**Gene Conley** (4–4)	Joe Nuxhall (1–4)	None	15,280	30–44
75	July 5	@ Reds	2–0	**Robin Roberts** (5–7)	Don Newcombe (3–6)	None	5,847	31–44
76	July 6	@ Braves	8–5 (10)	**Gene Conley** (5–4)	Don McMahon (2–6)	None	14,753	32–44
77	July 7	@ Braves	0–2	Warren Spahn (8–5)	**Chris Short** (4–5)	None	14,983	32–45
78	July 8 (1)	Pirates	6–5 (10)	**Turk Farrell** (7–2)	Fred Green (4–3)	None	see 2nd game	33–45
79	July 8 (2)	Pirates	3–8	Bob Friend (10–5)	**Dallas Green** (1–3)	None	36,056	33–46
80	July 9	Pirates	2–1	**Gene Conley** (6–4)	Vern Law (11–4)	None	19,541	34–46
81	July 10	Pirates	2–6	Harvey Haddix (6–4)	**Robin Roberts** (5–8)	Roy Face (13)	13,012	34–47
–	July 11	**1960 Major League Baseball All-Star Game at Municipal Stadium in Kansas City**						
–	July 13	**1960 Major League Baseball All-Star Game at Yankee Stadium in New York City**						
82	July 15	Braves	5–7	Warren Spahn (9–6)	**Chris Short** (4–6)	Ron Piché (4)	19,429	34–48
83	July 16	Braves	4–6	Joey Jay (3–5)	**Robin Roberts** (5–9)	Don Nottebart (1)	17,969	34–49
84	July 17	Braves	3–7	Lew Burdette (10–4)	**Gene Conley** (6–5)	None	10,686	34–50
85	July 19	@ Giants	0–2	Juan Marichal (1–0)	**John Buzhardt** (4–6)	None	13,279	34–51
86	July 20	@ Giants	1–3	Sam Jones (12–9)	**Chris Short** (4–7)	Johnny Antonelli (4)	10,504	34–52
87	July 21	@ Giants	3–0	**Robin Roberts** (6–9)	Jack Sanford (8–8)	None	9,561	35–52
88	July 22	@ Dodgers	0–2	Don Drysdale (8–10)	**Gene Conley** (6–6)	None	21,335	35–53
89	July 23	@ Dodgers	0–2	Roger Craig (4–1)	**Dallas Green** (1–4)	None	31,631	35–54
90	July 24	@ Dodgers	0–9	Stan Williams (10–2)	**John Buzhardt** (4–7)	None	14,027	35–55
91	July 26	@ Cubs	4–3	**Robin Roberts** (7–9)	Glen Hobbie (9–13)	**Turk Farrell** (7)	4,791	36–55
92	July 27	@ Cubs	7–5	**Gene Conley** (7–6)	Seth Morehead (1–7)	**Turk Farrell** (8)	7,409	37–55
93	July 28	@ Cubs	3–2	**Dallas Green** (2–4)	Dick Ellsworth (4–8)	None	5,442	38–55
94	July 29	@ Cardinals	0–3	Ernie Broglio (11–5)	**John Buzhardt** (4–8)	None	14,028	38–56
95	July 30	@ Cardinals	3–6	Larry Jackson (13–8)	**Chris Short** (4–8)	None	8,332	38–57
96	July 31 (1)	@ Cardinals	2–9	Curt Simmons (3–1)	**Gene Conley** (7–7)	None	see 2nd game	38–58
97	July 31 (2)	@ Cardinals	3–5	Ray Sadecki (5–5)	**Robin Roberts** (7–10)	Lindy McDaniel (16)	20,061	38–59

August (10–20)

#	Date	Opponent	Score	Win	Loss	Save	Attendance	Record
98	August 2 (1)	Giants	7–3	**Dallas Green** (3–4)	Jack Sanford (9–9)	**Turk Farrell** (9)	see 2nd game	39–59
99	August 2 (2)	Giants	6–5	**Turk Farrell** (8–2)	Stu Miller (3–4)	None	26,276	40–59
100	August 3	Giants	6–5	**Turk Farrell** (9–2)	Billy Loes (3–2)	None	11,169	41–59
101	August 4	Giants	7–8	Johnny Antonelli (4–6)	**Jim Owens** (3–10)	Stu Miller (1)	12,876	41–60
–	August 5	Dodgers	Postponed (rain); Makeup: August 7 as a traditional double-header					
102	August 6	Dodgers	3–1	**Robin Roberts** (8–10)	Stan Williams (11–4)	None	22,741	42–60
103	August 7 (1)	Dodgers	7–8	Larry Sherry (9–8)	**Turk Farrell** (9–3)	None	see 2nd game	42–61
104	August 7 (2)	Dodgers	1–2	Sandy Koufax (4–8)	**John Buzhardt** (4–9)	None	22,707	42–62
105	August 9 (1)	Cardinals	4–5	Lindy McDaniel (9–3)	**Dallas Green** (3–5)	None	see 2nd game	42–63
106	August 9 (2)	Cardinals	0–6	Curt Simmons (4–2)	**Gene Conley** (7–8)	None	21,312	42–64
107	August 10	Cardinals	5–6 (10)	Lindy McDaniel (10–3)	**Turk Farrell** (9–4)	Ed Bauta (1)	12,176	42–65
108	August 12	Cubs	10–6	**Chris Short** (5–8)	Glen Hobbie (10–16)	**Turk Farrell** (10)	10,714	43–65
109	August 13	Cubs	2–4	Bob Anderson (6–7)	**John Buzhardt** (4–10)	Don Elston (9)	2,533	43–66
110	August 14 (1)	Cubs	1–2	Dick Ellsworth (6–8)	**Gene Conley** (7–9)	None	see 2nd game	43–67
111	August 14 (2)	Cubs	3–7	Moe Drabowsky (3–1)	**Dallas Green** (3–6)	Glen Hobbie (1)	11,725	43–68
112	August 15	@ Pirates	4–3	**Art Mahaffey** (1–0)	Roy Face (6–6)	**Chris Short** (1)	19,912	44–68
113	August 16 (1)	@ Pirates	2–11	Bob Friend (13–9)	**Jim Owens** (3–11)	None	see 2nd game	44–69
114	August 16 (2)	@ Pirates	3–4	Roy Face (7–6)	**Robin Roberts** (8–11)	None	34,673	44–70
115	August 17	@ Pirates	3–5	Harvey Haddix (8–7)	**John Buzhardt** (4–11)	Clem Labine (4)	33,598	44–71
116	August 18	@ Braves	0–1	Lew Burdette (14–7)	**Gene Conley** (7–10)	None	16,338	44–72
117	August 19	@ Braves	3–2	**Art Mahaffey** (2–0)	Juan Pizarro (6–6)	None	14,723	45–72
118	August 20	@ Braves	0–1	Bob Buhl (12–6)	**Robin Roberts** (8–12)	None	23,985	45–73
119	August 21	@ Braves	2–3	Warren Spahn (15–7)	**John Buzhardt** (4–12)	None	23,169	45–74
120	August 23	@ Cardinals	2–4	Ray Sadecki (7–7)	**Gene Conley** (7–11)	Lindy McDaniel (20)	13,283	45–75
121	August 24	@ Cardinals	5–3	**Art Mahaffey** (3–0)	Larry Jackson (11–14)	**Chris Short** (2)	10,636	46–75
122	August 26	@ Cubs	4–2	**Robin Roberts** (9–12)	Bob Anderson (7–8)	None	5,021	47–75
123	August 27	@ Cubs	4–5	Don Elston (7–7)	**Chris Short** (5–9)	None	9,657	47–76
124	August 28	@ Cubs	6–8	Don Cardwell (6–12)	**Gene Conley** (7–12)	Joe Schaffernoth (3)	11,383	47–77
125	August 29	@ Giants	2–0	**Art Mahaffey** (4–0)	Mike McCormick (11–10)	None	10,062	48–77
126	August 30	@ Giants	1–2	Sam Jones (15–14)	**Robin Roberts** (9–13)	None	7,014	48–78
127	August 31	@ Dodgers	1–3	Roger Craig (6–1)	**John Buzhardt** (4–13)	None	12,586	48–79

September (9–16)

#	Date	Opponent	Score	Win	Loss	Save	Attendance	Record
128	September 1	@ Dodgers	2–3 (11)	Don Drysdale (12–13)	**Turk Farrell** (9–5)	None	28,946	48–80
129	September 3	@ Pirates	3–2	**Art Mahaffey** (5–0)	Vern Law (19–6)	None	18,487	49–80
130	September 4	@ Pirates	3–5	Vinegar Bend Mizell (10–7)	**Jim Owens** (3–12)	Clem Labine (6)	17,856	49–81
131	September 5	Reds	2–9	Bob Purkey (16–8)	**Robin Roberts** (9–14)	None	8,979	49–82
132	September 6	Reds	1–6 (10)	Jim Brosnan (7–2)	**John Buzhardt** (4–14)	None	4,396	49–83
133	September 7	Cubs	2–0	**Gene Conley** (8–12)	Don Cardwell (7–13)	None	3,323	50–83
134	September 8	Cubs	1–2	Glen Hobbie (14–17)	**Art Mahaffey** (5–1)	None	3,808	50–84
135	September 9	Cardinals	1–5 (5)	Larry Jackson (16–12)	**Robin Roberts** (9–15)	None	18,677	50–85
136	September 10	Cardinals	7–2	**Jim Owens** (4–12)	Ray Sadecki (8–8)	None	6,444	51–85
137	September 11	Cardinals	3–7	Curt Simmons (7–3)	**John Buzhardt** (4–15)	Lindy McDaniel (24)	3,722	51–86
–	September 12	Dodgers	Postponed (rain; Hurricane Donna); Makeup: September 13 as a traditional double-header					
138	September 13 (1)	Dodgers	1–2 (10)	Johnny Podres (12–11)	**Gene Conley** (8–13)	Larry Sherry (7)	see 2nd game	51–87
139	September 13 (2)	Dodgers	1–4	Sandy Koufax (8–12)	**Art Mahaffey** (5–2)	None	7,559	51–88
140	September 14	Giants	5–1	**Robin Roberts** (10–15)	Billy O'Dell (7–12)	None	4,432	52–88
141	September 15	Giants	6–8 (11)	Johnny Antonelli (6–7)	**Turk Farrell** (9–6)	Billy Loes (5)	4,847	52–89
142	September 16	@ Braves	0–4	Warren Spahn (20–9)	**John Buzhardt** (4–16)	None	6,117	52–90
143	September 17	@ Braves	5–2 (10)	**Turk Farrell** (10–6)	Ron Piché (2–5)	**Chris Short** (3)	11,523	53–90
144	September 18	@ Braves	1–7 (8)	Joey Jay (9–7)	**Art Mahaffey** (5–3)	None	10,561	53–91
145	September 20 (1)	Pirates	1–7	Bob Friend (17–11)	**Robin Roberts** (10–16)	None	see 2nd game	53–92
146	September 20 (2)	Pirates	2–3	Clem Labine (3–4)	**Jim Owens** (4–13)	None	17,216	53–93
147	September 23	@ Reds	6–1	**John Buzhardt** (5–16)	Bob Purkey (17–10)	None	3,919	54–93
148	September 24	@ Reds	0–5	Jim Maloney (2–5)	**Gene Conley** (8–14)	None	2,798	54–94
149	September 25	@ Reds	7–1	**Art Mahaffey** (6–3)	Jay Hook (11–18)	None	7,178	55–94
150	September 27	Braves	5–3	**Robin Roberts** (11–16)	Joey Jay (9–8)	**Turk Farrell** (11)	4,060	56–94
151	September 28	Braves	3–9	Lew Burdette (19–12)	**Jim Owens** (4–14)	None	2,884	56–95
152	September 30	Reds	7–6 (14)	**Chris Short** (6–9)	Orlando Peña (0–1)	None	3,370	57–95

October (2–0)

#	Date	Opponent	Score	Win	Loss	Save	Attendance	Record
153	October 1	Reds	7–3	**Robin Roberts** (12–16)	Jim Maloney (2–6)	None	1,897	58–95
154	October 2	Reds	6–1	**Art Mahaffey** (7–3)	Bob Purkey (17–11)	None	3,598	59–95

^{^[a]}The June 21, 1960 (game 2), game was protested by the Cubs in the bottom of the fifth inning. The protest was later denied.
^{^[b]}The June 21 game was suspended at the end of the eighth inning with the score 7–5 and was completed June 22, 1960.

=== Roster ===
1960 Philadelphia Phillies
**Roster**
**Pitchers**: 23 John Buzhardt; 46 Don Cardwell; 29 Gene Conley; 43 Turk Farrell; 22 Rubén Gómez; 46 Dallas Green; 28 Art Mahaffey; 37 Hank Mason; 42 Jack Meyer; 44 Al Neiger; 49 Jim Owens; 44 Taylor Phillips; 36 Robin Roberts; 34 Humberto Robinson; 41 Chris Short; 28 Curt Simmons	**Catchers**: 10 Jimmie Coker; 11 Clay Dalrymple; 5 Cal Neeman; **Infielders**: 20 Rubén Amaro; 5 Ed Bouchee; 1 Alvin Dark; 18 Pancho Herrera; 15 Joe Koppe; 4 Ted Lepcio; 2 Bobby Malkmus; 1 Joe Morgan; 8 Tony Taylor; 9 Lee Walls; 34 Bobby Wine; 30 Jim Woods	**Outfielders**: 9 Harry Anderson; 6 Johnny Callison; 7 Tony Curry; 3 Bobby Del Greco; 22 Tony González; 12 Dave Philley; 14 Wally Post; 16 Bobby Gene Smith; 17 Ken Walters	**Manager**: 39 Andy Cohen; 32 Gene Mauch; 24 Eddie Sawyer; **Coaches**: 21 Dick Carter; 39 Andy Cohen; 21 Peanuts Lowrey; 31 Ken Silvestri

== Player stats ==
=== Batting ===
==== Starters by position ====
Note: Pos = Position; G = Games played; AB = At bats; H = Hits; Avg. = Batting average; HR = Home runs; RBI = Runs batted in

Pos	Player	G	AB	H	Avg.	HR	RBI
C	Jimmie Coker	81	252	54	.214	6	34
1B	Pancho Herrera	145	512	144	.281	17	71
2B	Tony Taylor	127	505	145	.287	4	35
SS	Rubén Amaro	92	264	61	.231	0	16
3B	Al Dark	55	198	48	.242	3	14
LF	Bob Smith	98	217	62	.286	4	27
CF	Bobby Del Greco	100	300	71	.237	10	26
RF	Ken Walters	124	426	102	.239	8	37

==== Other batters ====
Note: G = Games played; AB = At bats; H = Hits; Avg. = Batting average; HR = Home runs; RBI = Runs batted in

Player	G	AB	H	Avg.	HR	RBI
Johnny Callison	99	288	75	.260	9	30
Tony Curry	95	245	64	.261	6	34
Tony González	78	241	72	.299	6	33
Lee Walls	65	181	36	.199	3	19
Joe Koppe	58	170	29	.171	1	13
Cal Neeman	59	160	29	.181	4	13
Clay Dalrymple	82	158	43	.272	4	21
Ted Lepcio	69	141	32	.227	2	8
Bobby Malkmus	79	133	28	.211	1	12
Harry Anderson	38	93	23	.247	5	12
Wally Post	34	84	24	.286	2	12
Joe Morgan	26	83	11	.133	0	2
Ed Bouchee	22	65	17	.262	0	8
Jim Woods	11	34	6	.176	1	3
Dave Philley	14	15	5	.333	0	4
Bobby Wine	4	14	2	.143	0	0

=== Pitching ===
==== Starting pitchers ====
Note: G = Games pitched; IP = Innings pitched; W = Wins; L = Losses; ERA = Earned run average; SO = Strikeouts

Player	G	IP	W	L	ERA	SO
Robin Roberts	35	237.1	12	16	4.02	122
John Buzhardt	30	200.1	5	16	3.86	73
Gene Conley	29	183.1	8	14	3.68	117
Jim Owens	31	150.0	4	14	5.04	83
Art Mahaffey	14	93.1	7	3	2.31	56

==== Other pitchers ====
Note: G = Games pitched; IP = Innings pitched; W = Wins; L = Losses; ERA = Earned run average; SO = Strikeouts

Player	G	IP	W	L	ERA	SO
Dallas Green	23	108.2	3	6	4.06	51
Chris Short	42	107.1	6	9	3.94	54
Don Cardwell	5	28.1	1	2	4.45	21
Jack Meyer	7	25.0	3	1	4.32	18
Curt Simmons	4	4.0	0	0	18.00	4

==== Relief pitchers ====
Note: G = Games pitched; W = Wins; L = Losses; SV = Saves; ERA = Earned run average; SO = Strikeouts

Player	G	W	L	SV	ERA	SO
Turk Farrell	59	10	6	11	2.70	70
Humberto Robinson	33	0	4	0	3.44	31
Rubén Gómez	22	0	3	1	5.33	24
Taylor Phillips	10	0	1	0	8.36	6
Al Neiger	6	0	0	0	5.68	3
Hank Mason	3	0	0	0	9.53	3

== Farm system ==
Level	Team	League	Manager
AAA	Indianapolis Indians	American Association	Johnny Hutchings and Ted Beard
AAA	Buffalo Bisons	International League	Kerby Farrell
AA	Chattanooga Lookouts	Southern Association	Spook Jacobs
A	Williamsport Grays	Eastern League	Frank Lucchesi
A	Asheville Tourists	Sally League	Chuck Kress
B	Des Moines Demons	Illinois–Indiana–Iowa League	Andy Seminick
C	Bakersfield Bears	California League	Lou Kahn
D	Johnson City Phillies	Appalachian League	Ben Tompkins
D	Tampa Tarpons	Florida State League	Moose Johnson
D	Elmira Pioneers	New York–Penn League	Jack Phillips

LEAGUE CO-CHAMPIONS: Williamsport
