= John Goetz (disambiguation) =

John Goetz is a baseball player.

John or Jack Goetz may also refer to:

- John Goetz (filmmaker), director of Uncle Vanya (1957 film)
- John Goetz (Jericho)
- Jack Goetz, pseudonym of Ronnie Barker
