= Walter Alston =

American baseball player and manager (1911–1984)

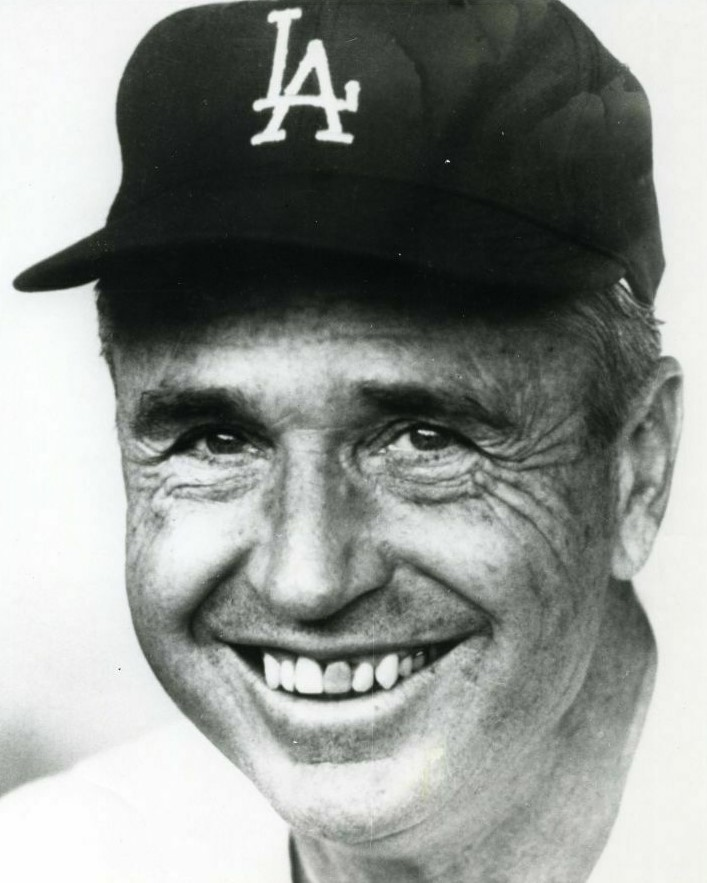
- Alston in 1976
- First baseman / Manager
- Born: December 1, 1911; Venice, Ohio, U.S.
- Died: October 1, 1984 (aged 72); Oxford, Ohio, U.S.
- Batted: Right Threw: Right

MLB debut
- September 27, 1936, for the St. Louis Cardinals

Last MLB appearance
- September 27, 1936, for the St. Louis Cardinals

MLB statistics
- Games managed: 3,658
- Managerial record: 2,040–1,613–5
- Winning %: .558
- Stats at Baseball Reference
- Managerial record at Baseball Reference

Teams
- As player: St. Louis Cardinals (1936); As manager: Brooklyn / Los Angeles Dodgers (1954–1976)

Career highlights and awards
- 4× World Series champion (1955, 1959, 1963, 1965); Los Angeles Dodgers No. 24 retired

Member of the National

Baseball Hall of Fame
- Induction: 1983
- Vote: Veterans Committee

Walter Emmons Alston (December 1, 1911 – October 1, 1984), nicknamed "Smokey", was an American professional baseball manager in Major League Baseball (MLB) who managed the Brooklyn / Los Angeles Dodgers from 1954 through 1976, signing 23 one-year contracts with the team. Regarded as one of the greatest managers in baseball history, Alston was known for his calm, reticent demeanor, for which he was sometimes referred to as "the Quiet Man."

Born and raised in rural Ohio, Alston lettered in baseball and basketball at Miami University in Oxford. A journeyman whose MLB playing career consisted of only one game–two innings played and one at-bat with the St. Louis Cardinals in 1936–Alston spent 19 years in the minor leagues as a player, player-manager and non-playing manager. His service included a stint as manager of the 1946 Nashua Dodgers, the first U.S.-based integrated professional team in modern baseball. After six successful seasons as manager of Brooklyn's Triple-A teams, the St. Paul Saints and Montreal Royals, Alston was promoted to manage the Dodgers in 1954.

As a major league manager, Alston led Dodger teams to seven National League (NL) pennants and four World Series titles, including the only championship title won while the club was still in Brooklyn. After 23 seasons, Alston retired with over 2,000 career wins and had been selected as Manager of the Year six times. He also managed NL All-Star teams to seven victories. Alston's number 24 was retired by the Los Angeles Dodgers in 1977. In 1983, he was elected to the Baseball Hall of Fame but was unable to attend his induction ceremony after suffering a heart attack that year and being hospitalized for a month. He never fully recovered and died in Oxford, Ohio, on October 1, 1984.

== Early life ==
Walter Emmons Alston was born on December 1, 1911, in Venice, Ohio. Alston spent much of his childhood on a farm in Morning Sun; when he was a teenager, the family moved to Darrtown.

Alston attended Milford Township High School in Darrtown, and received the nickname "Smokey" as a high school pitcher, owing to the speed of his fastball.

He graduated from high school in 1929 and married longtime girlfriend Lela Vaughn Alexander the next year.

In 1935, Alston graduated with a degree in industrial arts and physical education from Miami University in Oxford, Ohio. He said that finances were a challenge in college and that he had paid his way through school by playing pool. He lettered three years in both basketball and baseball.

== Playing career ==
Alston played minor league baseball as an infielder for the Greenwood Chiefs and Huntington Red Birds in 1935 and 1936, respectively. For the 1936 Huntington team, he hit 35 home runs in 120 games. Alston's only major league game was with the St. Louis Cardinals on September 27, 1936, substituting for Johnny Mize at first base. He later described his major league playing career to a reporter by saying, "Well, I came up to bat for the Cards back in '36, and Lon Warneke struck me out. That's it." He also committed one error in two fielding chances at first base.

Alston returned to the minor leagues after his brief MLB appearance. He split the 1937 season between the Houston Buffaloes and Rochester Red Wings, hitting for a combined .229 batting average. Alston played for the Portsmouth Red Birds in 1938, finishing the season with a .311 average and 28 home runs as Portsmouth won its only Middle Atlantic League championship. He returned to Portsmouth in 1940, hit 28 home runs and was a player-manager for part of the season. He was a player-manager for the next two seasons with the Springfield Cardinals and even appeared in seven games as a pitcher in 1942. He returned to Rochester as a first baseman and third baseman in 1943 then moved to the Trenton Packers, where he was a player-manager in 1944 and 1945. Alston had been offered the job in Trenton, a minor league farm club of the Brooklyn Dodgers, by Branch Rickey, the executive who had signed him as a player with St. Louis.

After his two seasons with Trenton, Alston served as a player-manager for the first integrated U.S. baseball team based in the twentieth century, the Nashua Dodgers of the Class-B New England League. Alston managed black Dodgers prospects Don Newcombe and Roy Campanella, leading Nashua to a New England League title in 1946. Alston later said that he did not give much consideration to racial issues and that he had simply thought about how much they would benefit the team.

Alston led the Pueblo Dodgers to the Western League title the next season. He appeared as a player in two games, which were his final professional playing appearances. For his 13-season minor league playing career, Alston hit .295 with 176 home runs. However, he hit only .239 in 535 at bats in Class AA, which was the highest minor league classification through 1945.

== Managerial career ==
=== Minor leagues ===
In 1948, Alston managed the St. Paul Saints, a Dodgers Class AAA affiliate, to an 86–68 win–loss record. The team finished in third place, 14 games behind an Indianapolis Indians team managed by Al López. That year, Alston managed Campanella again, where Campanella integrated the American Association. The media was critical of Alston for playing Campanella; they said that the catcher was simply there to integrate the league. Campanella hit 13 home runs in 35 games and fans were dismayed when he was called up to the Dodgers. The 1949 Saints finished with a 93-60 record and four of its players collected more than 90 runs batted in (RBI). The team finished in first place, half a game in front of Indianapolis. During the baseball off-season, Alston worked as a teacher in Darrtown.

From 1950 to 1953, Alston managed another Dodgers AAA affiliate, the Montreal Royals of the International League. The team won between 86 and 95 games during each season of Alston's tenure. The 1951 and 1952 Montreal Royals won International League pennants. In 1951 and 1953, Montreal won the Governors' Cup playoff tournament. Alston was inducted into the International League Hall of Fame many years later in 2010.

=== Brooklyn Dodgers ===
Alston was named manager of the Brooklyn Dodgers for the 1954 season. His predecessor, Chuck Dressen, had moved on from the Dodgers after the team's leadership refused to sign him to a two-year or three-year contract. Dressen had won two pennants in three years and nearly won a third.

Dodgers executive Buzzie Bavasi fought for Alston to be hired in Brooklyn. Bringing Alston to Brooklyn has been described as Bavasi's biggest contribution to the team's history. Alston was an unknown at the major league level and the New York Daily News reported his hiring with the headline "Walter Who?"

Becoming immediately known for his quiet nature, Alston was sometimes referred to as "the Quiet Man". Alston's personality contrasted with that of Dressen, who was much more outspoken. Sportswriters had difficulty writing about Alston at first because he did not say much. He also seemed more conservative in his decisions on the field, which drew criticism from his players even though he had managed many of them in the minor leagues. Don Zimmer said that he had learned more from Dressen and that Dressen knew more about baseball than Alston. Jackie Robinson did not like Alston at first either, according to Robinson's wife.

Alston commented on his approach, saying, "I never criticized a player for a mistake on the spot. Whenever I got steamed up about something, I always wanted to sleep on it and face the situation with a clear head." Sportswriter Jim Murray said that Alston was "the only guy in the game who could look Billy Graham right in the face without blushing and who would order corn on the cob in a Paris restaurant." The 1954 Dodgers finished second in the NL as both Gil Hodges and Duke Snider hit at least 40 home runs and registered 130 runs batted in.

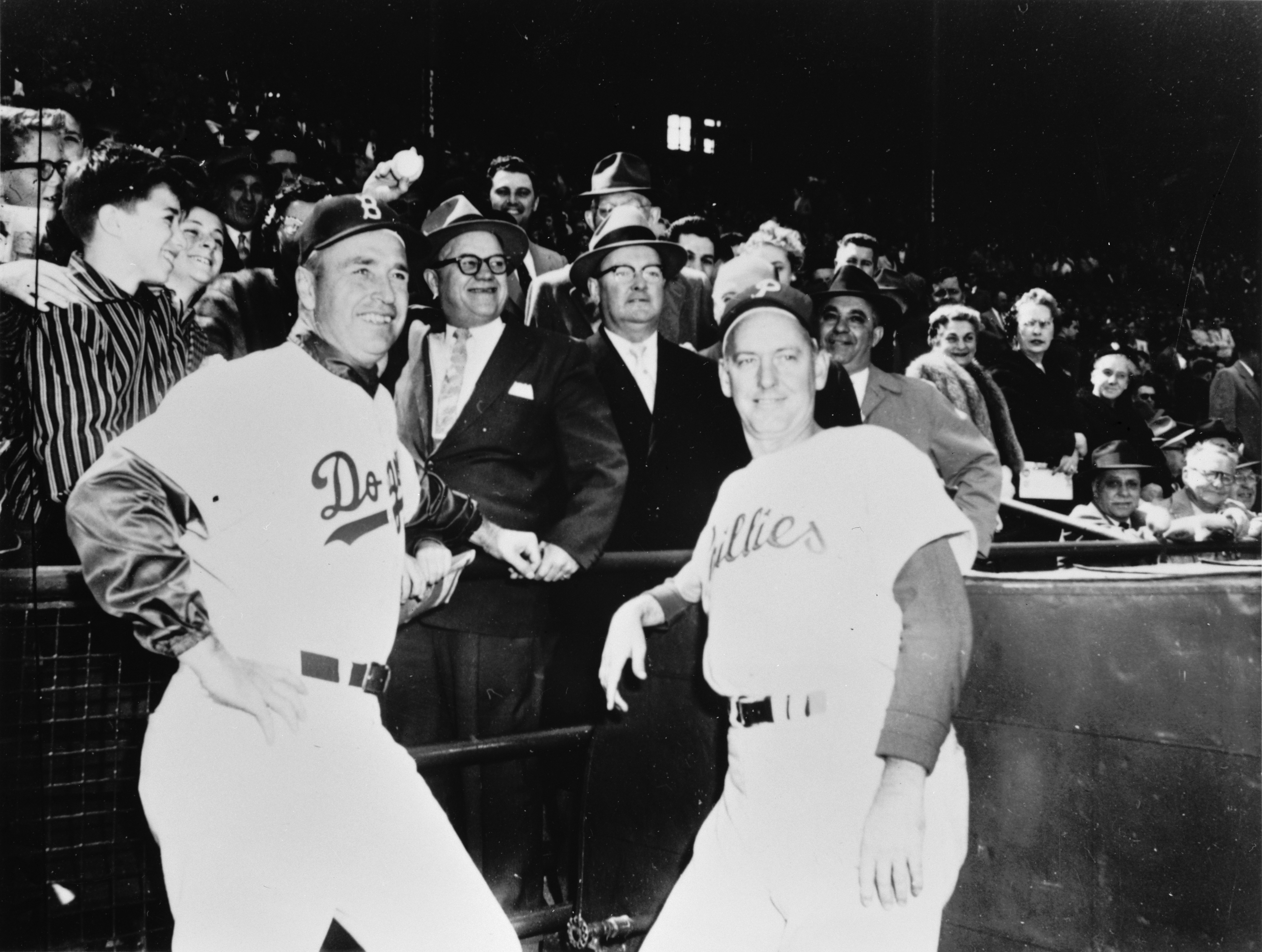
Alston (left) with Phillies manager Mayo Smith in 1957

Brooklyn got off to a strong start in 1955, but an Associated Press article noted that Alston was reticent in response to questions and that he did not seem like a manager who had won ten consecutive games. The Brooklyn Dodgers won the NL pennant and their only World Series championship. They clinched the pennant on September 8, earlier than any team had in NL history; at 92–46 (.667), the Dodgers were 17 games ahead of second place Milwaukee with 16 remaining. In the World Series, Johnny Podres, started two games (third and seventh); he had a mediocre 9–10 regular season record, but won both postseason starts. The pitcher had struggled with arm problems for much of the season.

Sandy Koufax emerged as a pitcher for the Dodgers during that championship season. Alston was criticized by Jackie Robinson, Roy Campanella, and others over his sparse use of Koufax in his early career. During Koufax's second MLB start, he pitched a shutout, giving up two hits and striking out 14 batters. However, that success did not prompt a lot of opportunities for Koufax. The pitcher appeared in only 12 games that season, mostly in relief, and would continue to be used sparingly and inconsistently by Alston over the next few seasons. Years later, Koufax's teammate Don Drysdale told sportswriter Roger Kahn that he suspected that "latent antisemitism" on Alston's part likely played a role in the way Koufax, who was Jewish, was used as a young pitcher.

The 1956 team repeated as NL champions; the team was bolstered by the play of Duke Snider, who hit a league-leading 43 home runs and also led the league in walks. Despite winning the first two games of the World Series, the Dodgers lost in seven games to the Yankees. The Dodgers fell to third place (84–70) in 1957, the final season in Brooklyn.

=== Early years in Los Angeles ===
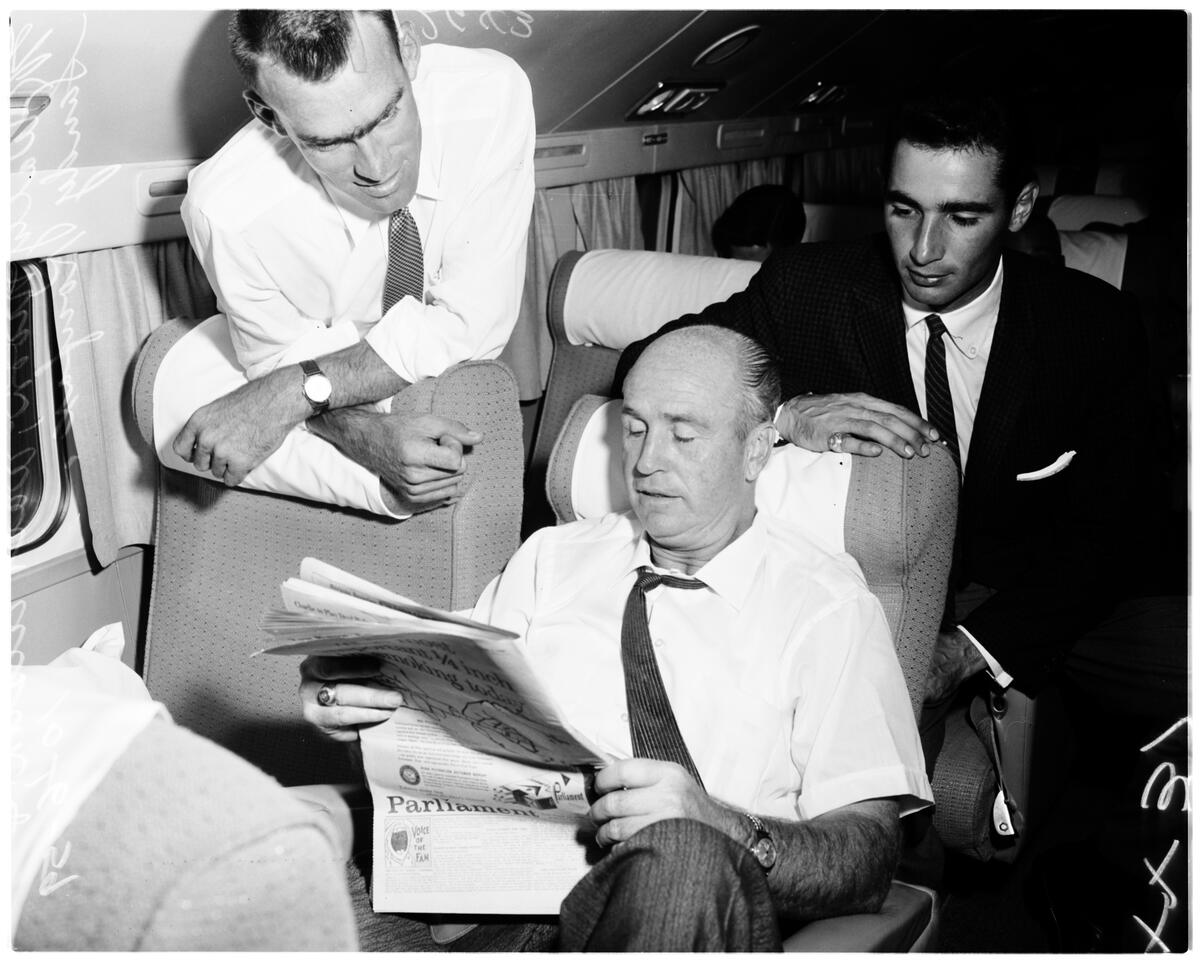
Alston with outfielder Wally Moon and pitcher Sandy Koufax, before Game 1 of the 1959 World Series

The team finished 21 games back in seventh place (71–83 (.461)) in 1958, the club's first season in Los Angeles. Criticism of Alston had begun to mount during that season, but he led the Dodgers to a world championship in 1959. Six players on the 1959 team finished with double-digit totals in home runs, while 22-year-old Drysdale led the team's pitchers with 17 wins. Several Los Angeles players, including Wally Moon, characterized Alston as indecisive in the late 1950s and 1960s. However, Moon later came to describe Alston as a good manager who had gotten "good mileage" out of his players.

Managing the NL All-Star Team in 1960, Alston attracted some controversy when he left Milwaukee Braves pitchers Warren Spahn and Lew Burdette off the roster. An Associated Press report said the omission may have been a snub directed at Dressen, who was the manager in Milwaukee. The 1960 Dodgers finished in fourth place. The following year, the team finished in second place after veteran Duke Snider missed one month with a broken arm. The Dodgers lost the lead in the 1962 NL pennant race and rumors surfaced that Alston and coach Leo Durocher might be fired, but the team retained both for 1963.

The Dodgers swept the World Series in 1963, the first time that the New York Yankees had lost a World Series in four games. Alston's pitchers excelled, with Koufax striking out 23 batters over two games winning the World Series MVP Award. Over the four games, Alston employed only four pitchers: three starters and one reliever. The 1964 team was 80–82, its first losing season since 1958. Alston used the team's 1964 performance to motivate them moving forward. In spring training before the 1965 season, he said that he would not let his team forget the difficulties they had in the previous season.

The Dodgers returned to the World Series in 1965 against Minnesota. Alston could not start his number one pitcher, Koufax, in the opening game on October 6 because Koufax was observing Yom Kippur. Instead, Alston turned to Drysdale, who struggled and surrendered seven runs in just 2 2/3 innings. When Alston came to the mound to remove him in the bottom of the third, Drysdale quipped, "I bet right now you wish I was Jewish, too." The team recovered from losing that first game and they won the World Series in seven games. Koufax appeared in three games during the series, registering two shutouts.

Alston's Dodgers teams of the 1960s benefited from the strong pitching by Drysdale and Koufax. In 1966, both players held out of spring training and demanded three-year contracts each worth $500,000 (equivalent to $4,960,000 in 2025), which was more money than anyone was making in baseball at the time. The players were eventually signed for lesser amounts. Drysdale struggled that year, but Koufax won 27 games. The Dodgers returned to the World Series, but were swept by the Baltimore Orioles. Koufax retired after the season on the advice of doctors who examined his sore arm. Drysdale retired three years later. Both men had pitched their entire major league careers for Alston.

=== Final years as manager ===
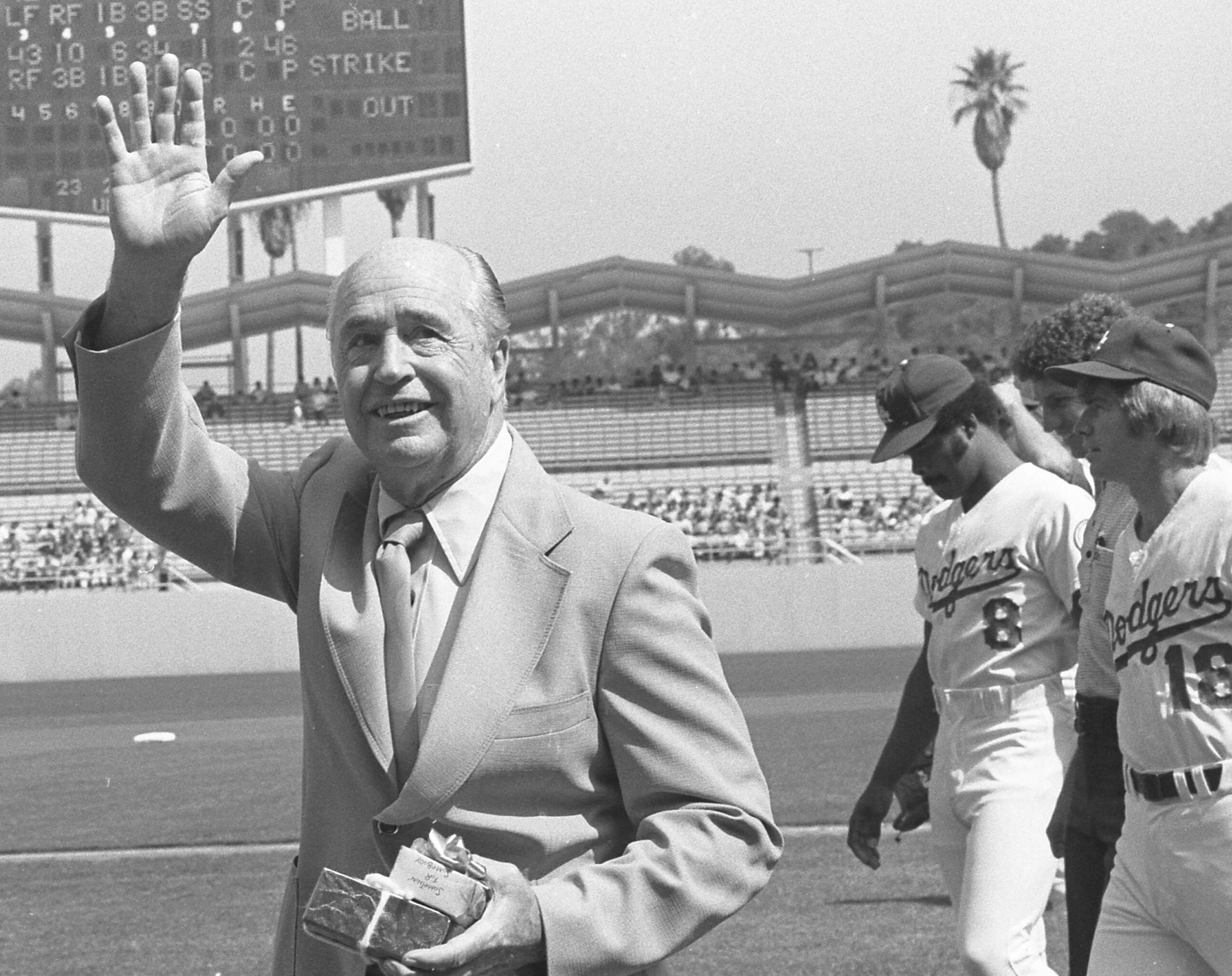
Alston waves to appreciative fans at Dodger Stadium a week after his retirement

Alston guided his teams to at least 85 wins per season in his last eight years at the helm, with six runner-up finishes in the NL West division during that span. The team came very close to a division title in 1971; after falling 11 games out of first place, the team performed well late in the season and finished one game behind the San Francisco Giants. Beginning in 1973, Alston's team featured an infield of Steve Garvey, Davey Lopes, Bill Russell, and Ron Cey. The group played together for eight years, remaining together long after the end of Alston's tenure.

In 1974, the Dodgers won the NL pennant and faced the two-time defending champion Oakland Athletics in the World Series. Alston used closer Mike Marshall in a record-setting 106 games that season and Marshall won the Cy Young Award. Alston received some media attention when he considered using Marshall as a starter. Marshall ended up appearing in all five games of the series and gave up one run in nine innings, but he did not start a game; the Dodgers lost four games to one as the A's completed their three-peat. The 1975 and 1976 teams won 88 and 92 games respectively, but finished well behind Cincinnati in both seasons.

A rift was developing among the Dodger players in the mid-1970s. Garvey was being heavily promoted by the Dodgers' P.R. staff, and some of his teammates resented the attention, thinking Garvey was trying too hard to get endorsement opportunities. Cey, Lopes, and another unnamed player criticized Garvey in a mid-June 1976 San Bernardino Sun-Telegram article, which prompted Alston to call a team meeting. At this meeting, Garvey said, "If anyone has anything to say about me, I want it said to my face, here and now." No one said anything. Pitcher Tommy John thought it was at this point that Alston began to lose control of the team.

On July 17, 1976, he became the fifth manager to win 2,000 games. In September 1976, Alston announced that he would retire at the end of the season. At a press conference, he said, "I've been in baseball for 41 years and it's been awfully good to me. This has been a pretty big day. I had three birdies playing golf for the first time in my life and now I'm announcing that I'm stepping down as manager. I told Peter this afternoon to give somebody else a chance to manage the club." When Tommy Lasorda was selected to succeed him, Alston asked Lasorda to take over as manager for the final four games of the season. Alston retired with 2,063 wins (2,040 in the regular season and 23 in the postseason). Alston was named NL Manager of the Year six times. He also managed NL All-Star squads a record nine times and won seven of those games. At a time when multi-year contracts were on the rise, Alston's managerial career consisted of 23 one-year contracts. He earned seven NL pennants in that span.

Sportswriter Leonard Koppett described Alston's role with the Dodgers, pointing out that O'Malley was always seen as "the boss" while Alston stuck to the on-field management of the team. Koppett said that Alston's loyalty and subdued nature contributed to the stability that the team enjoyed. O'Malley once commented that Alston was "non-irritating. Do you realize how important it is to have a manager who doesn't irritate you?"

== Managerial statistics ==
Team	Year	Regular season						Postseason			
Team	Year	Games	Won	Lost	Tied	Pct.	Games	Won	Lost	Pct.	Notes
BKN	1954	154	92	62	0	.597	2nd in NL	–	–	–	–
BKN	1955	154	98	55	1	.640	1st in NL	4	3	.571	Won World Series (NYY)
BKN	1956	154	93	61	0	.604	1st in NL	3	4	.429	Lost World Series (NYY)
BKN	1957	154	84	70	0	.545	3rd in NL	–	–	–	–
LAD	1958	154	71	83	0	.461	7th in NL	–	–	–	–
LAD	1959	156	88	68	0	.564	1st in NL	4	2	.667	Won World Series (CHW)
LAD	1960	154	82	72	0	.532	4th in NL	–	–	–	–
LAD	1961	154	89	65	0	.578	2nd in NL	–	–	–	–
LAD	1962	165	102	63	0	.618	2nd in NL	–	–	–	–
LAD	1963	163	99	63	1	.610	1st in NL	4	0	1.000	Won World Series (NYY)
LAD	1964	164	80	82	2	.494	7th in NL	–	–	–	–
LAD	1965	162	97	65	0	.599	1st in NL	4	3	.571	Won World Series (MIN)
LAD	1966	162	95	67	1	.586	1st in NL	0	4	.000	Lost World Series (BAL)
LAD	1967	162	73	89	0	.451	8th in NL	–	–	–	–
LAD	1968	162	76	86	0	.469	8th in NL	–	–	–	–
LAD	1969	162	85	77	0	.525	4th in NL West	–	–	–	–
LAD	1970	161	87	74	0	.540	2nd in NL West	–	–	–	–
LAD	1971	162	89	73	0	.549	2nd in NL West	–	–	–	–
LAD	1972	155	85	70	0	.548	3rd in NL West	–	–	–	–
LAD	1973	162	95	66	1	.590	2nd in NL West	–	–	–	–
LAD	1974	162	102	60	0	.630	1st in NL West	4	5	.444	Lost World Series (OAK)
LAD	1975	162	88	74	0	.543	2nd in NL West	–	–	–	–
LAD	1976	158	90	68	0	.570	2nd in NL West	Resigned*			
BKN/LAD total		3658	2040	1613	5	.558		23	21	.523	
Total		3658	2040	1613	5	.558		23	21	.523	

== Later life and legacy ==
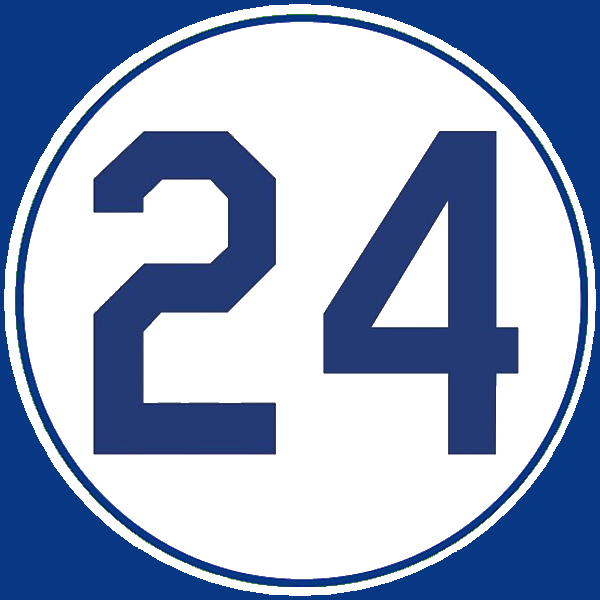
Walter Alston's number 24 was retired by the Los Angeles Dodgers in 1977.

The Dodgers retired Alston's number 24 the year after he stepped down as manager, becoming only the fourth Dodger to receive the honor to that time. He was elected to the National Baseball Hall of Fame in 1983. Alston suffered a heart attack that year and was hospitalized for a month. Alston's grandson traveled to Cooperstown to represent the ill former manager at the Hall of Fame induction ceremony.

Alston died on October 1, 1984 in an Oxford hospital from complications from the recent heart attack. He was 72. A funeral home spokesman said Alston had remained ill since the heart attack. He is interred at Darrtown Cemetery in Darrtown, Ohio.

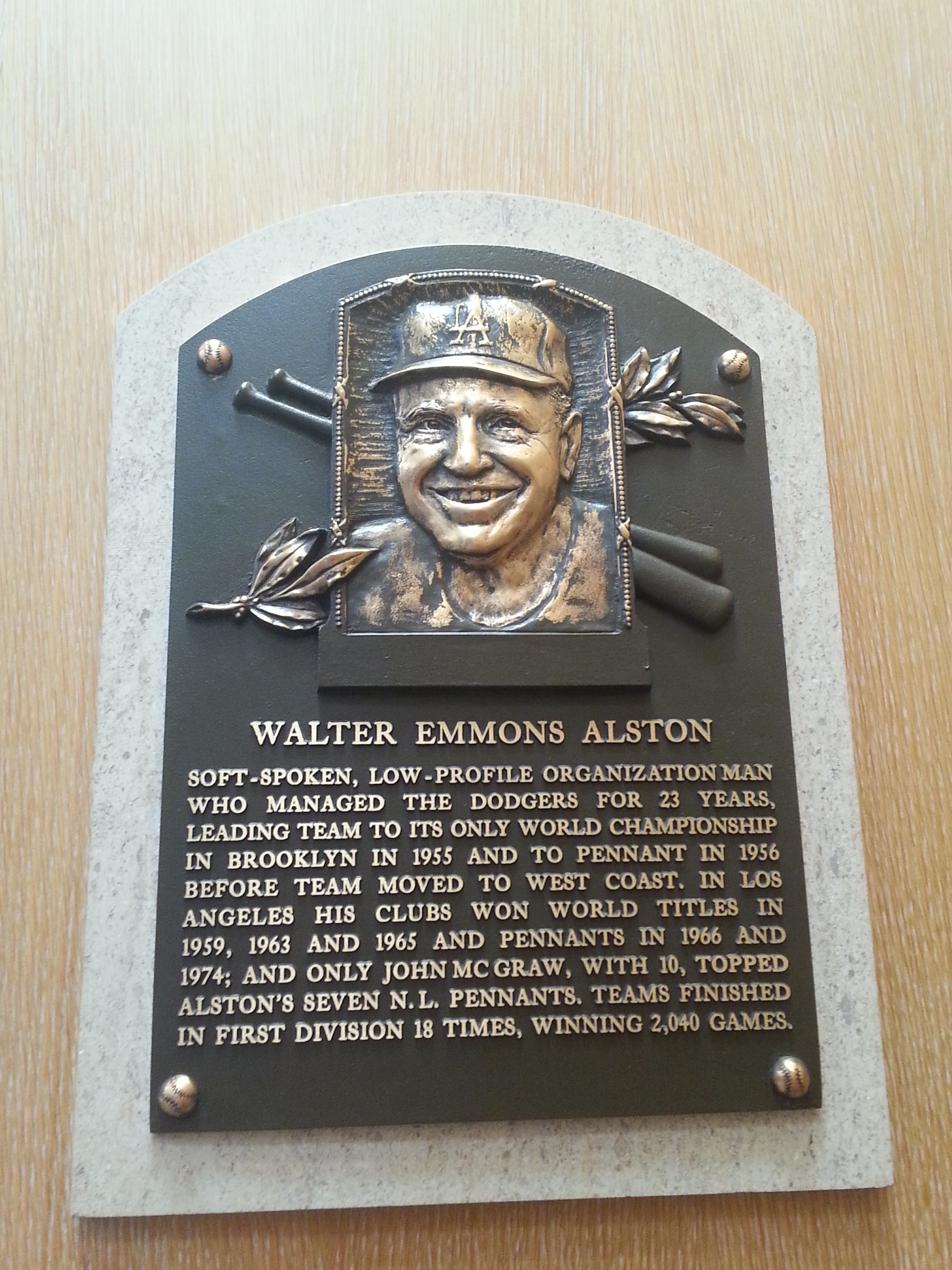
Alston's plaque at the Baseball Hall of Fame in Cooperstown

Upon Alston's death, MLB commissioner Peter Ueberroth referred to him as one of baseball's greatest managers. Former Dodgers great Duke Snider acknowledged occasional run-ins with Alston, but said Alston excelled at utilizing the specific strengths of each team he had managed.

Broadcaster Vin Scully said of Alston:

I always imagined him to be the type who could ride shotgun on a stage through Indian territory. He was all man and two yards tall. He was very quiet, very controlled. He never made excuses. He gave the players the credit and he took the blame. He was so solid, so American.

Alston is also credited with helping to break down the barriers for female sports journalists. On October 1, 1974, after the Los Angeles Dodgers defeated the Houston Astros to clinch the NL West at the Houston Astrodome, he invited Anita Martini to the post-game press conference in the locker room. She became the first female journalist allowed in any major league locker room.

In 1999, Ohio State Route 177 was renamed to Walter "Smokey" Alston Memorial Highway in his honor. He was inducted into the International League Hall of Fame in 2010. A memorial to Alston is located at Milford Township Community Park in his hometown of Darrtown.

== See also ==
- List of Major League Baseball managerial wins and winning percentage leaders
