= 1960 St. Louis Cardinals season =

Major League Baseball season

1960 St. Louis Cardinals
- League: National League
- Ballpark: Busch Stadium I
- City: St. Louis, Missouri
- Record: 83–68 (.558)
- League place: 3rd
- Owners: August "Gussie" Busch
- General managers: Bing Devine
- Managers: Solly Hemus
- Television: KPLR-TV, Ch. 11 (Buddy Blattner)
- Radio: KMOX-AM 1120 (Harry Caray, Joe Garagiola)
- Stats: ESPN.com; Baseball Reference

The 1960 St. Louis Cardinals season was the team's 79th season in St. Louis, Missouri and its 69th season in the National League. The Cardinals went 86–68 during the season, a fifteen-game improvement over the previous season, and finished third in the National League, nine games behind the World Champion Pittsburgh Pirates.

== Offseason ==
- October 13, 1959: Hal Jeffcoat was released by the Cardinals.
- December 2, 1959: Gene Green and Charles Staniland (minors) were traded by the Cardinals to the Baltimore Orioles for Bob Nieman.
- December 4, 1959: Bill Smith and Bob Smith were traded by the Cardinals to the Philadelphia Phillies for Carl Sawatski.

== Regular season ==
First baseman Bill White and third baseman Ken Boyer won Gold Gloves this year.

=== Season standings ===
National League
Team	W	L	Pct.	GB	Home	Road
Pittsburgh Pirates	95	59	.617	—	52‍–‍25	43‍–‍34
Milwaukee Braves	88	66	.571	7	51‍–‍26	37‍–‍40
St. Louis Cardinals	86	68	.558	9	51‍–‍26	35‍–‍42
Los Angeles Dodgers	82	72	.532	13	42‍–‍35	40‍–‍37
San Francisco Giants	79	75	.513	16	45‍–‍32	34‍–‍43
Cincinnati Reds	67	87	.435	28	37‍–‍40	30‍–‍47
Chicago Cubs	60	94	.390	35	33‍–‍44	27‍–‍50
Philadelphia Phillies	59	95	.383	36	31‍–‍46	28‍–‍49

=== Record vs. opponents ===
1960 National League record Sources:
Team	CHC	CIN	LAD	MIL	PHI	PIT	SF	STL
Chicago	—	10–12	9–13	7–15	10–12	7–15	9–13–1	8–14–1
Cincinnati	12–10	—	12–10	9–13	9–13	6–16	11–11	8–14
Los Angeles	13–9	10–12	—	12–10	16–6	11–11	10–12	10–12
Milwaukee	15–7	13–9	10–12	—	16–6	9–13	14–8	11–11
Philadelphia	12–10	13–9	6–16	6–16	—	7–15	8–14	7–15
Pittsburgh	15–7	16–6	11–11	13–9	15–7	—	14–8–1	11–11
San Francisco	13–9–1	11–11	12–10	8–14	14–8	8–14–1	—	13–9
St. Louis	14–8–1	14–8	12–10	11–11	15–7	11–11	9–13	—

=== Notable transactions ===
- May 28, 1960: Vinegar Bend Mizell and Dick Gray were traded by the Cardinals to the Pittsburgh Pirates for Julián Javier and Ed Bauta.
- June 15, 1960: Jim Donohue was traded by the Cardinals to the Los Angeles Dodgers for John Glenn.
- August 2, 1960: Marshall Bridges was selected off waivers from the Cardinals by the Cincinnati Reds.
- August 13, 1960: Del Rice was signed as a free agent by the Cardinals.
- September 7, 1960: Del Rice was selected off waivers from the Cardinals by the Baltimore Orioles.

=== Roster ===
1960 St. Louis Cardinals
Roster
Pitchers: 36 Frank Barnes; 33 Ed Bauta; 30 Marshall Bridges; 32 Ernie Broglio; 23 Cal Browning; 24 Bob Duliba; 31 Bob Gibson; 46 Bob Grim; 39 Larry Jackson; 44 Ron Kline; 41 Lindy McDaniel; 35,36 Bob Miller; 33 Vinegar Bend Mizell; 35 Mel Nelson; 37 Ray Sadecki; 31 Curt Simmons	Catchers: 34 Chris Cannizzaro; 8 Darrell Johnson; 9 Tim McCarver; 29 Del Rice; 1 Carl Sawatski; 2 Hal Smith; Infielders: 14 Ken Boyer; 30 Rocky Bridges; 43 Duke Carmel; 18 George Crowe; 27 Julio Gotay; 10 Alex Grammas; 27 Dick Gray; 25 Julián Javier; 17 Ed Olivares; 19 Bob Sadowski; 25 Wally Shannon; 20 Daryl Spencer; 12 Bill White	Outfielders: 11 Ellis Burton; 38 Doug Clemens; 15 Joe Cunningham; 21 Curt Flood; 22 John Glenn; 23 Charlie James; 22 Gary Kolb; 24 Don Landrum; 28 Walt Moryn; 6 Stan Musial; 4 Bob Nieman; 22 Leon Wagner	Manager: 7 Solly Hemus; Coaches: 8 Darrell Johnson; 9 Ray Katt; 5 Johnny Keane; 26 Howie Pollet; 3 Harry Walker

== Player stats ==
=== Batting ===
==== Starters by position ====
Note: Pos = Position; G = Games played; AB = At bats; H = Hits; Avg. = Batting average; HR = Home runs; RBI = Runs batted in

Pos	Player	G	AB	H	Avg.	HR	RBI
C	Hal Smith	127	337	77	.228	2	28
1B	Bill White	144	554	157	.283	16	79
2B	Julián Javier	119	451	107	.237	4	21
SS	Daryl Spencer	148	507	131	.258	16	58
3B	Ken Boyer	151	552	168	.304	32	97
LF	Stan Musial	116	331	91	.275	17	63
CF	Curt Flood	140	396	94	.237	8	38
RF	Joe Cunningham	139	492	138	.280	6	39

==== Other batters ====
Note: G = Games played; AB = At bats; H = Hits; Avg. = Batting average; HR = Home runs; RBI = Runs batted in

Player	G	AB	H	Avg.	HR	RBI
Walt Moryn	75	200	49	.245	11	35
Alex Grammas	102	196	48	.245	4	17
Bob Nieman	81	188	54	.287	4	31
Carl Sawatski	78	179	41	.229	6	27
Leon Wagner	39	98	21	.214	4	11
George Crowe	73	72	17	.236	4	13
Charlie James	43	50	9	.180	2	5
Don Landrum	13	49	12	.245	2	3
John Glenn	32	31	8	.258	0	5
Ellis Burton	29	28	6	.214	0	2
Wally Shannon	18	23	4	.174	0	1
Tim McCarver	10	10	2	.200	0	0
Chris Cannizzaro	7	9	2	.222	0	1
Julio Gotay	3	8	3	.375	0	0
Dick Gray	6	8	1	.125	0	1
Ed Olivares	3	5	0	.000	0	0
Duke Carmel	4	3	0	.000	0	0
Gary Kolb	9	3	0	.000	0	0
Darrell Johnson	8	2	0	.000	0	0
Del Rice	1	2	0	.000	0	0
Bob Sadowski	1	1	0	.000	0	0
Rocky Bridges	3	0	0	----	0	0
Doug Clemens	1	0	0	----	0	0

=== Pitching ===
==== Starting pitchers ====
Note: G = Games pitched; IP = Innings pitched; W = Wins; L = Losses; ERA = Earned run average; SO = Strikeouts

Player	G	IP	W	L	ERA	SO
Larry Jackson	43	282.0	18	13	3.48	171
Ray Sadecki	26	157.1	9	9	3.78	95
Curt Simmons	23	152.0	7	4	2.66	63
Vinegar Bend Mizell	9	55.1	1	3	4.55	42

==== Other pitchers ====
Note: G = Games pitched; IP = Innings pitched; W = Wins; L = Losses; ERA = Earned run average; SO = Strikeouts

Player	G	IP	W	L	ERA	SO
Ernie Broglio	52	226.1	21	9	2.74	188
Ron Kline	34	117.2	4	9	6.04	54
Bob Gibson	27	86.2	3	6	5.61	69
Bob Miller	15	52.2	4	3	3.42	33
Mel Nelson	2	8.0	0	1	3.38	7
Frank Barnes	4	7.2	0	1	3.52	8

==== Relief pitchers ====
Note: G = Games pitched; W = Wins; L = Losses; SV = Saves; ERA = Earned run average; SO = Strikeouts

Player	G	W	L	SV	ERA	SO
Lindy McDaniel	65	12	4	27	2.09	105
Bob Duliba	27	4	4	0	4.20	23
Marshall Bridges	20	2	2	1	3.45	27
Bob Grim	15	1	0	0	3.05	15
Ed Bauta	9	0	0	1	6.32	6
Cal Browning	1	0	0	0	40.50	0

== Farm system ==
Level	Team	League	Manager
AAA	Rochester Red Wings	International League	Clyde King
AA	Memphis Chicks	Southern Association	Joe Schultz
AA	Tulsa Oilers	Texas League	Vern Benson
B	Winston-Salem Red Birds	Carolina League	Chase Riddle
C	Winnipeg Goldeyes	Northern League	Whitey Kurowski
C	Billings Mustangs	Pioneer League	Homer Ray Wilson
D	Dothan Cardinals	Alabama–Florida League	Fred McAlister
D	Daytona Beach Islanders	Florida State League	Frank Calo
D	Keokuk Cardinals	Midwest League	Al Unser

LEAGUE CHAMPIONS: Tulsa, Winnipeg
