= 1960 Milwaukee Braves season =

1960 Milwaukee Braves
- League: National League
- Ballpark: Milwaukee County Stadium
- City: Milwaukee, Wisconsin
- Record: 88–66 (.571)
- League place: 2nd
- Owners: Louis R. Perini
- General managers: John McHale
- Managers: Chuck Dressen
- Radio: WEMP; WTMJ (Earl Gillespie, Blaine Walsh)

The 1960 Milwaukee Braves season was the eighth for the franchise in Milwaukee, and the 90th overall. The Braves finished in second place in the National League with a record of 88–66, seven games behind the NL and World Series Champion Pittsburgh Pirates.

== Offseason ==
- October 13, 1959: Enos Slaughter was released by the Braves.
- October 13, 1959: Mickey Vernon was released by the Braves.
- October 24, 1959: Rico Carty was signed as an amateur free agent by the Braves.
- October 26, 1959: Stan Lopata was released by the Braves.
- November 30, 1959: 1959 rule 5 draft
  - Clay Dalrymple was drafted from the Braves by the Philadelphia Phillies.
  - Georges Maranda was drafted from the Braves by the San Francisco Giants.
- February 9, 1960: Stan Lopata was signed as a free agent by the Braves.
- March 1960: Jim Bolger was purchased by the Braves from the Philadelphia Phillies.

=== Managerial and coaching turnover ===
After 3 1/2 seasons at the helm of the Braves and compiling a record of 341–231 (.596) with two NL pennants and the 1957 World Series championship, manager Fred Haney, 63, resigned on October 4 in the wake of the 1959 tie-breaker series loss to the L.A. Dodgers. On October 24, the Braves appointed another veteran skipper, Chuck Dressen, 65, well known as the manager of the "Boys of Summer" Brooklyn Dodgers of 1951–1953, as Haney's successor for 1960. The Braves had considered a number of high-profile former big-league managers, as well as minor league skipper Ben Geraghty, before settling on Dressen.

Pitching coach Whit Wyatt was Dressen's only 1960 holdover from Haney's coaching staff, with Billy Herman, John Fitzpatrick and George Susce all departing with Haney.

== Regular season ==
- April 17, 1960: Eddie Mathews hit the 300th home run of his career.

=== Season standings ===
National League
Team	W	L	Pct.	GB	Home	Road
Pittsburgh Pirates	95	59	.617	—	52‍–‍25	43‍–‍34
Milwaukee Braves	88	66	.571	7	51‍–‍26	37‍–‍40
St. Louis Cardinals	86	68	.558	9	51‍–‍26	35‍–‍42
Los Angeles Dodgers	82	72	.532	13	42‍–‍35	40‍–‍37
San Francisco Giants	79	75	.513	16	45‍–‍32	34‍–‍43
Cincinnati Reds	67	87	.435	28	37‍–‍40	30‍–‍47
Chicago Cubs	60	94	.390	35	33‍–‍44	27‍–‍50
Philadelphia Phillies	59	95	.383	36	31‍–‍46	28‍–‍49

=== Record vs. opponents ===
1960 National League record Sources:
Team	CHC	CIN	LAD	MIL	PHI	PIT	SF	STL
Chicago	—	10–12	9–13	7–15	10–12	7–15	9–13–1	8–14–1
Cincinnati	12–10	—	12–10	9–13	9–13	6–16	11–11	8–14
Los Angeles	13–9	10–12	—	12–10	16–6	11–11	10–12	10–12
Milwaukee	15–7	13–9	10–12	—	16–6	9–13	14–8	11–11
Philadelphia	12–10	13–9	6–16	6–16	—	7–15	8–14	7–15
Pittsburgh	15–7	16–6	11–11	13–9	15–7	—	14–8–1	11–11
San Francisco	13–9–1	11–11	12–10	8–14	14–8	8–14–1	—	13–9
St. Louis	14–8–1	14–8	12–10	11–11	15–7	11–11	9–13	—

=== Notable transactions ===
- May 17, 1960: Ray Boone was traded by the Braves to the Boston Red Sox for Ron Jackson.
- July 15, 1960: Al Heist was traded by the Braves to the Chicago Cubs for Earl Averill, Jr. and $30,000.
- August 13, 1960: Earl Averill, Jr. was traded by the Braves to the Chicago White Sox for Don Prohovich (minors) and $15,000.
- September 21, 1960: Elrod Hendricks was released by the Braves.

=== Roster ===
1960 Milwaukee Braves
Roster
Pitchers: 30 George Brunet; 10 Bob Buhl; 33 Lew Burdette; 36 Terry Fox; 32 Bob Giggie; 47 Joey Jay; 36 Ken MacKenzie; 20 Don McMahon; 32 Don Nottebart; 35 Ron Piché; 34 Juan Pizarro; 17 Bob Rush; 21 Warren Spahn; 16 Carl Willey	Catchers: 1 Del Crandall; 6 Charley Lau; 15 Stan Lopata; Infielders: 9 Joe Adcock; 19 Ray Boone; 13 Chuck Cottier; 23 Johnny Logan; 18 Félix Mantilla; 41 Eddie Mathews; 4 Red Schoendienst; 14 Frank Torre	Outfielders: 44 Hank Aaron; 38 Bill Bruton; 43 Wes Covington; 19 Alvin Dark; 42 Len Gabrielson; 11 Eddie Haas; 42 Mike Krsnich; 24 Lee Maye; 12 Mel Roach; 25 Al Spangler; Other batters: 15 Joe Torre	Manager: 7 Chuck Dressen; Coaches: 8 George Myatt; 48 Andy Pafko; 3 Bob Scheffing; 5 Whit Wyatt

== Player stats ==
=== Batting ===
==== Starters by position ====
Note: Pos = Position; G = Games played; AB = At bats; H = Hits; Avg. = Batting average; HR = Home runs; RBI = Runs batted in

Pos	Player	G	AB	H	Avg.	HR	RBI
C	Del Crandall	142	537	158	.294	19	77
1B	Joe Adcock	138	514	153	.298	25	91
2B	Chuck Cottier	95	229	52	.227	3	19
3B	Eddie Mathews	153	548	152	.277	39	124
SS	Johnny Logan	136	482	118	.245	7	42
LF	Wes Covington	95	281	70	.249	10	35
CF	Bill Bruton	151	629	180	.286	12	54
RF	Hank Aaron	153	590	172	.292	40	126

==== Other batters ====
Note: G = Games played; AB = At bats; H = Hits; Avg. = Batting average; HR = Home runs; RBI = Runs batted in

Player	G	AB	H	Avg.	HR	RBI
Red Schoendienst	68	226	58	.257	1	19
Félix Mantilla	63	148	38	.257	3	11
Al Dark	50	141	42	.298	1	18
Mel Roach	48	140	42	.300	3	18
Al Spangler	101	105	28	.267	0	6
Lee Maye	41	83	25	.301	0	2
Charley Lau	21	53	10	.189	0	2
Frank Torre	21	44	9	.205	0	5
Eddie Haas	32	32	7	.219	1	5
Ray Boone	7	12	3	.250	0	4
Mike Krsnich	4	9	3	.333	0	2
Stan Lopata	7	8	1	.125	0	0
Len Gabrielson	4	3	0	.000	0	0
Joe Torre	2	2	1	.500	0	0

=== Pitching ===
==== Starting pitchers ====
Note: G = Games pitched; IP = Innings pitched; W = Wins; L = Losses; ERA = Earned run average; SO = Strikeouts

Player	G	IP	W	L	ERA	SO
Lew Burdette	45	275.2	19	13	3.36	83
Warren Spahn	40	267.2	21	10	3.50	154
Bob Buhl	36	238.2	16	9	3.09	121
Carl Willey	28	144.2	6	7	4.35	109
Juan Pizarro	21	114.1	6	7	4.55	88

==== Other pitchers ====
Note: G = Games pitched; IP = Innings pitched; W = Wins; L = Losses; ERA = Earned run average; SO = Strikeouts

Player	G	IP	W	L	ERA	SO
Joey Jay	32	133.1	9	8	3.24	90
George Brunet	17	49.2	2	0	5.07	39
Don Nottebart	5	15.1	1	0	4.11	8

==== Relief pitchers ====
Note: G = Games pitched; W = Wins; L = Losses; SV = Saves; ERA = Earned run average; SO = Strikeouts

Player	G	W	L	SV	ERA	SO
Don McMahon	48	3	6	10	5.94	50
Ron Piché	37	3	5	9	3.56	38
Bob Rush	10	2	0	1	4.20	8
Ken MacKenzie	9	0	1	0	6.48	9
Terry Fox	5	0	0	0	4.32	5
Bob Giggie	3	0	0	0	4.15	5

== Farm system ==
Level	Team	League	Manager
AAA	Louisville Colonels	American Association	Ben Geraghty and Bill Adair
AAA	Sacramento Solons	Pacific Coast League	Ernie White
AA	Austin Senators	Texas League	Alex Monchak
A	Jacksonville Braves	Sally League	Red Murff
B	Cedar Rapids Braves	Illinois–Indiana–Iowa League	Jimmy Brown
B	Yakima Bears	Northwest League	Buddy Hicks
C	Eau Claire Braves	Northern League	Bill Steinecke
C	Boise Braves	Pioneer League	Billy Smith
D	Davenport Braves	Midwest League	Travis Jackson
D	Wellsville Braves	New York–Penn League	Harry Minor

LEAGUE CHAMPIONS: Louisville, Yakima, Boise, Wellsville
