= 1960 Cincinnati Reds season =

1960 Cincinnati Reds
- League: National League
- Ballpark: Crosley Field
- City: Cincinnati
- Owners: Powel Crosley Jr.
- General managers: Gabe Paul
- Managers: Fred Hutchinson
- Television: WLW (George Bryson, Frank McCormick)
- Radio: WKRC (Waite Hoyt, Jack Moran)

The 1960 Cincinnati Reds season consisted of the Reds finishing in sixth place in the National League standings, with a record of 67–87, 28 games behind the National League and World Series champion Pittsburgh Pirates.

The Reds were managed by Fred Hutchinson and played their home games at Crosley Field and attracted 664,486 customers, eighth and last in the league.

== Offseason ==
- November 21, 1959: Tom Acker was traded by the Reds to the Kansas City Athletics for Frank House.
- December 6, 1959: Frank Thomas was traded by the Reds to the Chicago Cubs for Lee Walls, Lou Jackson, and Bill Henry.
- December 15, 1959: Johnny Temple was traded by the Reds to the Cleveland Indians for Billy Martin, Gordy Coleman and Cal McLish.
- March 12, 1960: Tony Pérez was signed as an amateur free agent by the Reds.
- Prior to the 1960 season: Jesse Gonder was acquired from the Cincinnati Reds by the New York Yankees.

== Regular season ==
=== Season standings ===
National League
Team	W	L	Pct.	GB	Home	Road
Pittsburgh Pirates	95	59	.617	—	52‍–‍25	43‍–‍34
Milwaukee Braves	88	66	.571	7	51‍–‍26	37‍–‍40
St. Louis Cardinals	86	68	.558	9	51‍–‍26	35‍–‍42
Los Angeles Dodgers	82	72	.532	13	42‍–‍35	40‍–‍37
San Francisco Giants	79	75	.513	16	45‍–‍32	34‍–‍43
Cincinnati Reds	67	87	.435	28	37‍–‍40	30‍–‍47
Chicago Cubs	60	94	.390	35	33‍–‍44	27‍–‍50
Philadelphia Phillies	59	95	.383	36	31‍–‍46	28‍–‍49

=== Record vs. opponents ===
1960 National League record Sources:
Team	CHC	CIN	LAD	MIL	PHI	PIT	SF	STL
Chicago	—	10–12	9–13	7–15	10–12	7–15	9–13–1	8–14–1
Cincinnati	12–10	—	12–10	9–13	9–13	6–16	11–11	8–14
Los Angeles	13–9	10–12	—	12–10	16–6	11–11	10–12	10–12
Milwaukee	15–7	13–9	10–12	—	16–6	9–13	14–8	11–11
Philadelphia	12–10	13–9	6–16	6–16	—	7–15	8–14	7–15
Pittsburgh	15–7	16–6	11–11	13–9	15–7	—	14–8–1	11–11
San Francisco	13–9–1	11–11	12–10	8–14	14–8	8–14–1	—	13–9
St. Louis	14–8–1	14–8	12–10	11–11	15–7	11–11	9–13	—

=== Notable transactions ===
- June 15, 1960: Tony González and Lee Walls were traded by the Reds to the Philadelphia Phillies for Wally Post, Harry Anderson, and Fred Hopke (minors).
- July 8, 1960: Pete Rose was signed as an amateur free agent by the Reds.
- July 19, 1960: Brooks Lawrence was released by the Reds.
- August 2, 1960: Marshall Bridges was selected off waivers by the Reds from the St. Louis Cardinals.

=== Roster ===
1960 Cincinnati Reds
Roster
Pitchers: 34 Marshall Bridges; 42 Jim Brosnan; 46 Bob Grim; 44 Bill Henry; 47 Jay Hook; 46 Brooks Lawrence; 46 Jim Maloney; 40 Cal McLish; 36 Don Newcombe; 39 Joe Nuxhall; 31 Jim O'Toole; 32 Claude Osteen; 43 Orlando Peña; 37 Bob Purkey; 45 Duane Richards; 35 Raúl Sánchez; 34 Ted Wieand	Catchers: 9 Joe Azcue; 6 Ed Bailey; 9 Dutch Dotterer; 8 Frank House; Infielders: 21 Rogelio Álvarez; 27 Harry Anderson; 17 Leo Cárdenas; 17 Elio Chacón; 18 Gordy Coleman; 19 Cliff Cook; 14 Willie Jones; 10 Eddie Kasko; 19 Whitey Lockman; 12 Billy Martin; 11 Roy McMillan; 20 Frank Robinson	Outfielders: 25 Gus Bell; 22 Joe Gaines; 22 Tony González; 24 Jerry Lynch; 28 Vada Pinson; 29 Wally Post; 27 Lee Walls; Other batters: 29 Pete Whisenant	Manager: 1 Fred Hutchinson; Coaches: 2 Cot Deal (Pitching); 5 Whitey Lockman; 3 Wally Moses; 4 Reggie Otero

== Player stats ==
=== Batting ===
==== Starters by position ====
Note: Pos = Position; G = Games played; AB = At bats; H = Hits; Avg. = Batting average; HR = Home runs; RBI = Runs batted in

Pos	Player	G	AB	H	Avg.	HR	RBI
C	Ed Bailey	133	441	115	.261	13	67
1B	Frank Robinson	139	464	138	.297	31	83
2B	Billy Martin	103	317	78	.246	3	16
SS	Roy McMillan	124	399	94	.236	10	42
3B	Eddie Kasko	126	479	140	.292	6	51
LF	Wally Post	77	249	70	.281	17	38
CF	Vada Pinson	154	652	187	.287	20	61
RF	Gus Bell	143	515	135	.262	12	62

==== Other batters ====
Note: G = Games played; AB = At bats; H = Hits; Avg. = Batting average; HR = Home runs; RBI = Runs batted in

Player	G	AB	H	Avg.	HR	RBI
Gordy Coleman	66	251	68	.271	6	32
Jerry Lynch	102	159	46	.289	6	27
Willie Jones	79	149	40	.268	3	27
Cliff Cook	54	149	31	.208	3	13
Leo Cárdenas	48	142	33	.232	1	12
Elio Chacón	49	116	21	.181	0	7
Tony González	39	99	21	.212	3	14
Lee Walls	29	84	23	.274	1	7
Dutch Dotterer	33	79	18	.228	2	11
Harry Anderson	42	66	11	.167	1	9
Joe Azcue	14	31	3	.097	0	3
Frank House	23	28	5	.179	0	3
Joe Gaines	11	15	3	.200	0	1
Whitey Lockman	21	10	2	.200	1	1
Rogelio Álvarez	3	9	1	.111	0	0
Pete Whisenant	1	1	0	.000	0	0

=== Pitching ===
==== Starting pitchers ====
Note: G = Games pitched; IP = Innings pitched; W = Wins; L = Losses; ERA = Earned run average; SO = Strikeouts

Player	G	IP	W	L	ERA	SO
Bob Purkey	41	252.2	17	11	3.60	97
Jay Hook	36	222.0	11	18	4.50	103
Jim O'Toole	34	196.1	12	12	3.80	124
Don Newcombe	16	82.2	4	6	4.57	36
Jim Maloney	11	63.2	2	6	4.66	48

==== Other pitchers ====
Note: G = Games pitched; IP = Innings pitched; W = Wins; L = Losses; ERA = Earned run average; SO = Strikeouts

Player	G	IP	W	L	ERA	SO
Cal McLish	37	151.1	4	14	4.16	56
Joe Nuxhall	38	112.0	1	8	4.42	72
Claude Osteen	20	48.1	0	1	5.03	15

==== Relief pitchers ====
Note: G = Games pitched; W = Wins; L = Losses; SV = Saves; ERA = Earned run average; SO = Strikeouts

Player	G	W	L	SV	ERA	SO
Bill Henry	51	1	5	17	3.19	58
Jim Brosnan	57	7	2	12	2.36	62
Bob Grim	26	2	2	2	4.45	22
Marshall Bridges	14	4	0	2	1.07	26
Raúl Sánchez	8	1	0	0	4.91	5
Brooks Lawrence	7	1	0	1	10.57	2
Ted Wieand	5	0	1	0	10.38	3
Orlando Peña	4	0	1	0	2.89	9
Duane Richards	2	0	0	0	9.00	2

== Farm system ==
Level	Team	League	Manager
AAA	Havana Sugar Kings/ Jersey City Jerseys	International League	Tony Castaño and Nap Reyes
AAA	Seattle Rainiers	Pacific Coast League	Dick Sisler
AA	Nashville Vols	Southern Association	Jim Turner
A	Columbia Reds	Sally League	Max Macon
B	Topeka Reds	Illinois–Indiana–Iowa League	Johnny Vander Meer
C	Missoula Timberjacks	Pioneer League	Joe Tedesco
D	Palatka Redlegs	Florida State League	Dave Bristol
D	Geneva Redlegs	New York–Penn League	Reno DeBenedetti and Jack Cassini

LEAGUE CHAMPIONS: Palatka
Havana franchise transferred to Jersey City and renamed July 13, 1960
