= 1960 San Francisco Giants season =

1960 San Francisco Giants
- League: National League
- Ballpark: Candlestick Park
- City: San Francisco
- Record: 79–75 (.513)
- League place: 5th
- Owners: Horace Stoneham
- General managers: Chub Feeney
- Managers: Bill Rigney (W-33; L-25); Tom Sheehan (W-46; L-50)
- Television: KTVU (Russ Hodges, Lon Simmons)
- Radio: KSFO-AM 560 (Russ Hodges, Lon Simmons, Bill King)

The 1960 San Francisco Giants season was the Giants' 78th year in Major League Baseball. The team moved their home games from Seals Stadium to the new Candlestick Park. In their third season in the Golden Gate City, the Giants finished in fifth place in the National League, 16 games behind the World Champion Pittsburgh Pirates. The Giants hit 62 triples, the most in the club's San Francisco era.

== Offseason ==
- November 30, 1959: Joey Amalfitano was drafted by the Giants from the Toronto Maple Leafs in the 1959 rule 5 draft.
- November 30, 1959: Jackie Brandt, Gordon Jones, and Roger McCardell were traded by the Giants to the Baltimore Orioles for Billy Loes and Billy O'Dell.
- November 30, 1959: Georges Maranda was drafted by the Giants from the Milwaukee Braves in the 1959 rule 5 draft.

== Regular season ==
=== Season standings ===
National League
Team	W	L	Pct.	GB	Home	Road
Pittsburgh Pirates	95	59	.617	—	52‍–‍25	43‍–‍34
Milwaukee Braves	88	66	.571	7	51‍–‍26	37‍–‍40
St. Louis Cardinals	86	68	.558	9	51‍–‍26	35‍–‍42
Los Angeles Dodgers	82	72	.532	13	42‍–‍35	40‍–‍37
San Francisco Giants	79	75	.513	16	45‍–‍32	34‍–‍43
Cincinnati Reds	67	87	.435	28	37‍–‍40	30‍–‍47
Chicago Cubs	60	94	.390	35	33‍–‍44	27‍–‍50
Philadelphia Phillies	59	95	.383	36	31‍–‍46	28‍–‍49

=== Record vs. opponents ===
1960 National League record Sources:
Team	CHC	CIN	LAD	MIL	PHI	PIT	SF	STL
Chicago	—	10–12	9–13	7–15	10–12	7–15	9–13–1	8–14–1
Cincinnati	12–10	—	12–10	9–13	9–13	6–16	11–11	8–14
Los Angeles	13–9	10–12	—	12–10	16–6	11–11	10–12	10–12
Milwaukee	15–7	13–9	10–12	—	16–6	9–13	14–8	11–11
Philadelphia	12–10	13–9	6–16	6–16	—	7–15	8–14	7–15
Pittsburgh	15–7	16–6	11–11	13–9	15–7	—	14–8–1	11–11
San Francisco	13–9–1	11–11	12–10	8–14	14–8	8–14–1	—	13–9
St. Louis	14–8–1	14–8	12–10	11–11	15–7	11–11	9–13	—

=== Opening Day starters ===
- Don Blasingame
- Eddie Bressoud
- Orlando Cepeda
- Jim Davenport
- Sam Jones
- Willie Kirkland
- Willie Mays
- Willie McCovey
- Bob Schmidt

=== Notable transactions ===
- April 1960: Don Taussig was purchased from the Giants by the Portland Beavers.
- May 12, 1960: Dave Philley was purchased by the Giants from the Philadelphia Phillies.
- September 1, 1960: Dave Philley was purchased from the Giants by the Baltimore Orioles.

=== Candlestick Park ===
The Giants selected the name of Candlestick Park after a name-the-park contest on March 3, 1959. Prior to that, its construction site had been shown on maps as the generic Bay View Stadium. It was the first modern baseball stadium, as it was the first to be built entirely of reinforced concrete. Richard Nixon threw out the first baseball on the opening day of Candlestick Park on April 12, 1960, and called it the finest ballpark in the country.

=== Roster ===
1960 San Francisco Giants
Roster
Pitchers: 43 Johnny Antonelli; 36 Bud Byerly; 20 Don Choate; 7 Eddie Fisher; 19 Sam Jones; 36 Sherman Jones; 28 Billy Loes; 35 Georges Maranda; 27 Juan Marichal; 40 Mike McCormick; 37 Stu Miller; 41 Ramón Monzant; 31 Billy O'Dell; 33 Jack Sanford; 42 Joe Shipley	Catchers: 5 Hobie Landrith; 9 Bob Schmidt; 6 Neil Wilson; Infielders: 14 Joey Amalfitano; 10 Don Blasingame; 16 Ed Bressoud; 12 Jim Davenport; 7,20 Dale Long; 25 Jim Marshall; 44 Willie McCovey; 15 José Pagán; 17 Andre Rodgers	Outfielders: 23 Felipe Alou; 26 Matty Alou; 30 Orlando Cepeda; 29 Willie Kirkland; 24 Willie Mays; 32 Dave Philley	Manager: 18 Bill Rigney; 6 Tom Sheehan; Coaches: 2 Salty Parker; 1 Bill Posedel; 3 Wes Westrum

== Player stats ==
=== Batting ===
==== Starters by position ====
Note: Pos = Position; G = Games played; AB = At bats; H = Hits; Avg. = Batting average; HR = Home runs; RBI = Runs batted in

Pos	Player	G	AB	H	Avg.	HR	RBI
C	Bob Schmidt	110	344	92	.267	8	37
1B	Willie McCovey	101	260	62	.238	13	51
2B	Don Blasingame	136	523	123	.235	2	31
SS	Ed Bressoud	116	386	87	.225	9	43
3B	Jim Davenport	112	363	91	.251	6	38
LF	Orlando Cepeda	151	569	169	.297	24	96
CF	Willie Mays	153	595	190	.319	29	103
RF	Willie Kirkland	146	515	130	.252	21	65

==== Other batters ====
Note: G = Games played; AB = At bats; H = Hits; Avg. = Batting average; HR = Home runs; RBI = Runs batted in

Player	G	AB	H	Avg.	HR	RBI
Joey Amalfitano	106	328	91	.277	1	27
Felipe Alou	106	322	85	.264	8	44
Andre Rodgers	81	217	53	.244	2	22
Hobie Landrith	71	190	46	.242	1	20
Jim Marshall	75	118	28	.237	2	13
Dave Philley	39	61	10	.164	1	7
Dale Long	37	54	9	.167	3	6
José Pagán	18	49	14	.286	0	2
Neil Wilson	6	10	0	.000	0	0
Matty Alou	4	3	1	.333	0	0

=== Pitching ===
==== Starting pitchers ====
Note: G = Games pitched; IP = Innings pitched; W = Wins; L = Losses; ERA = Earned run average; SO = Strikeouts

Player	G	IP	W	L	ERA	SO
Mike McCormick	40	253.0	15	12	2.70	154
Sam Jones	39	234.0	18	14	3.19	190
Jack Sanford	37	219.0	12	14	3.82	125
Juan Marichal	11	81.1	6	2	2.66	58

==== Other pitchers ====
Note: G = Games pitched; IP = Innings pitched; W = Wins; L = Losses; ERA = Earned run average; SO = Strikeouts

Player	G	IP	W	L	ERA	SO
Billy O'Dell	43	202.2	8	13	3.20	145
Johnny Antonelli	41	112.1	6	7	3.77	57
Georges Maranda	17	50.2	1	4	4.62	28
Eddie Fisher	3	12.2	1	0	3.55	7

==== Relief pitchers ====
Note: G = Games pitched; W = Wins; L = Losses; SV = Saves; ERA = Earned run average; SO = Strikeouts

Player	G	W	L	SV	ERA	SO
Billy Loes	37	3	2	5	4.93	28
Stu Miller	47	7	6	2	3.90	65
Bud Byerly	19	1	0	2	5.32	13
Sherman Jones	16	1	1	1	3.09	10
Joe Shipley	15	0	0	0	5.40	9
Don Choate	4	0	0	0	2.25	7
Ramón Monzant	1	0	0	0	9.00	1

== Awards and honors ==
All-Star Game, first game All-Star Game, second game

== Farm system ==
Level	Team	League	Manager
AAA	Tacoma Giants	Pacific Coast League	Red Davis
AA	Rio Grande Valley Giants	Texas League	Ray Murray
A	Springfield Giants	Eastern League	Andy Gilbert
B	Eugene Emeralds	Northwest League	Richie Klaus
C	Fresno Giants	California League	Buddy Kerr
C	Pocatello Giants	Pioneer League	Mike McCormick
D	Salem Rebels	Appalachian League	Jodie Phipps
D	Quincy Giants	Midwest League	Sam Calderone
D	Artesia Giants	Sophomore League	George Genovese

LEAGUE CO-CHAMPIONS: Springfield
