= Georges Maranda =

Canadian baseball player (1932-2000)

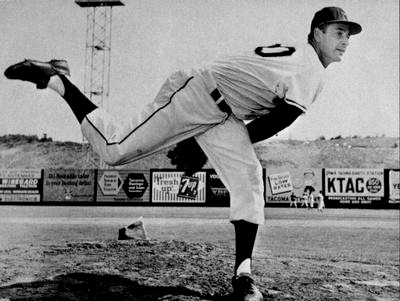
- Maranda with the Tacoma Giants, circa 1961
- Pitcher
- Born: January 15, 1932; Lévis, Québec, Canada
- Died: July 14, 2000 (aged 68); Lévis, Québec, Canada
- Batted: Right Threw: Right

MLB debut
- April 26, 1960, for the San Francisco Giants

Last MLB appearance
- September 10, 1962, for the Minnesota Twins

MLB statistics
- Win–loss record: 2–7
- Earned run average: 4.52
- Strikeouts: 64
- Stats at Baseball Reference

Teams
- San Francisco Giants (1960); Minnesota Twins (1962)

Georges Henri Maranda (January 15, 1932 – July 14, 2000) was a Canadian professional baseball player and a member of the Québec Baseball Hall of Fame. The right-handed pitcher appeared in 49 Major League Baseball games, including eight starts, for the 1960 San Francisco Giants and the 1962 Minnesota Twins. Born in Lévis, Québec, Maranda stood 6 feet 2 inches (1.88 m) tall and weighed 195 pounds (88 kg) (13 stone, 13 pounds).

== Career ==
Maranda signed with the Boston Braves in 1951. In 1959, he was one of three pitchers from Quebec, along with Ron Piché and Claude Raymond, on the roster of the Triple-A Louisville Colonels. Maranda won 18 games and lost only six in 1959; he led American Association pitchers in wins and was selected a league All-Star. He was acquired by the Giants in the Rule 5 draft that off-season.

He then spent the entire 1960 season on the San Francisco roster, working in 17 games, with four starts. On August 21, he earned his first MLB win when he went seven innings in a start at Wrigley Field against the Chicago Cubs, and held the home team to seven hits and three earned runs. The Giants won the game, 5–3. However, this became Maranda's only victory (against four losses) in that 1960 campaign. He was assigned to Triple-A Tacoma Giants at the close of the year and spent all of 1961 in the Pacific Coast League, posting a 10–4 win–loss record through 32 games.

The Minnesota Twins then selected Maranda in the 1961 Rule 5 draft, and kept him on their roster for the 1962 campaign.

On June 22, he made a spot start (just his second of the season) against the Los Angeles Angels at Metropolitan Stadium, leaving the game for a pinch hitter in the fifth inning, trailing 2–0. Minnesota then rallied in that inning to take a 3–2 lead, which they held for the rest of the game. It was Maranda's only triumph as a member of the Twins and his second and last MLB victory.

A week after the season ended, Maranda was traded to the Cleveland Indians, after which he never again pitched in the big leagues, retiring after spending the 1963 season with the Triple-A Jacksonville Suns.

In his 49 MLB games, Maranda lost seven of nine decisions (.222) and posted a 4.52 earned run average in 1231/3 innings pitched, allowing 119 hits, 16 home runs and 65 bases on balls, while fanning 64. He registered no complete games, shutouts or saves.

== Coaching career ==
In 1973–1974, he coached the Québec Carnavals in the Eastern League. Also in 1973, his hometown of Lévis, Québec, honoured him by naming its baseball park the George Maranda Stadium. In June, 2000, he was elected to the Québec Baseball Hall of Fame.

== Death ==
Georges Maranda is interred in the Mont-Marie Cemetery, Lévis located in Chaudiere-Appalaches Region, Quebec, Canada.
