= Al Neiger =

American baseball player (1939–2022)

- Pitcher
- Born: March 26, 1939; Wilmington, Delaware, U.S.
- Died: October 3, 2022 (aged 83); Wilmington, Delaware, U.S.
- Batted: Left Threw: Left

MLB debut
- July 30, 1960, for the Philadelphia Phillies

Last MLB appearance
- September 27, 1960, for the Philadelphia Phillies

MLB statistics
- Win–loss record: 0–0
- Earned run average: 5.68
- Innings pitched: 12 2/3
- Stats at Baseball Reference

Teams
- Philadelphia Phillies (1960)

Alvin Edward Neiger (March 26, 1939 – October 3, 2022) was an American professional baseball player. He was a left-handed pitcher who played for five seasons as a professional — including six games as a relief pitcher for the 1960 Philadelphia Phillies of Major League Baseball — after a stellar career at the University of Delaware. Neiger stood 6 feet (1.83 m) tall and weighed 195 pounds (88 kg) as an active player.

Neiger's six MLB games played were divided evenly with two appearances in each of the months of July, August and September 1960. In his debut, he was unscored upon in 1 1/3 innings against the St. Louis Cardinals, giving up only one hit, a single, to St. Louis pitcher Larry Jackson. Three rough outings followed, two against the Cardinals and one against the eventual National League and 1960 world champion Pittsburgh Pirates, in which Neiger gave up 13 hits and eight earned runs in 8 1/3 innings. Neiger was then unscored upon in his last two outings, in September, against the Milwaukee Braves and Cincinnati Reds. All told, he allowed eight earned runs, 16 hits, and four bases on balls in 12 2/3 MLB innings, with three strike outs.

In minor league baseball, Neiger was more successful, winning 43 of 75 decisions in 126 games.

But at the University of Delaware, he was a standout. Neiger was selected a first-team All-America in 1959, when he struck out 166 batters in 103 innings pitched, racked up 55 consecutive scoreless innings, and posted a 0.88 earned run average and a 9–3 record. He still holds the school record for strikeouts, earned run average, and consecutive scoreless innings pitched. A mechanical engineering major, he retired after the 1963 season and entered private business in the Wilmington area. Neiger is a member of both the University of Delaware Athletics Hall of Fame and the Delaware Sports Hall of Fame. He was inducted into the Delaware Sports Hall of Fame in 1984.

Neiger died on October 3, 2022, at the age of 83.
