= Ken Walters =

American baseball player (1933–2010)

- Outfielder
- Born: November 11, 1933; Fresno, California, U.S.
- Died: January 26, 2010 (aged 76); San Ramon, California, U.S.
- Batted: Right Threw: Right

MLB debut
- April 12, 1960, for the Philadelphia Phillies

Last MLB appearance
- September 29, 1963, for the Cincinnati Reds

MLB statistics
- Batting average: .231
- Home runs: 11
- Runs batted in: 58
- Stats at Baseball Reference

Teams
- Philadelphia Phillies (1960–1961); Cincinnati Reds (1963)

Kenneth Rogers Walters (November 11, 1933 – January 26, 2010) was a right-handed Major League Baseball outfielder who played from 1960 to 1961 for the Philadelphia Phillies and in 1963 with the Cincinnati Reds.

Walters was born in 1933 in Fresno, California. He graduated from Fremont High School in 1951. Signed as an amateur free agent by the Detroit Tigers in 1952, he began his minor league career that year, with the Jamestown Falcons. In 125 games, he hit .273 with three home runs and 32 doubles. He played with Jamestown in 1953 as well, hitting .320 with 13 home runs in 122 games.

Walters did not play in 1954 and 1955 because of military service, however, in 1956 he played for the Augusta Tigers and Charleston Senators, hitting a combined .251 with 20 home runs in 124 games. For the Birmingham Barons in 1957, he hit .275 with 17 home runs in 138 games, and in 1958 he hit .255 with eight home runs in 123 games for Charleston. He played for the Fort Worth Cats in 1959, hitting .291 with 21 home runs in 152 games. On December 5, 1959, he was traded to the Phillies with minor league Alex Cosmidis and Ted Lepcio for Chico Fernandez and Ray Semproch.

On April 12, 1960, he made his big league debut. In his first game – which was against the Cincinnati Reds – he went 1-for-3, singling in his first big league at-bat. Overall that season, he hit .239 with eight home runs in 124 games. In 426 at-bats, he struck out 50 times and walked 16 times. He was on the Phillies' bench in 1961, hitting .228 with two home runs in 180 at-bats over 86 games.

He was purchased by Cincinnati from the Phillies on February 9, 1962. He spent all of that season in the minors, hitting .300 with 22 home runs, 43 doubles, six triples and 96 RBI in 152 games for the San Diego Padres. Back in the big leagues in 1963, he appeared in only 49 games for the Reds, hitting .187 in 75 at-bats. He played his final big league game on September 29, 1963.

Although his big league career was over after 1963, his minor league career continued until 1965. He played for the minor league San Diego Padres in both 1964 and 1965, hitting .263 with 16 home runs in the former season and .227 with nine home runs in the latter.

Overall, Walters hit .231 with 11 home runs and 58 RBI in 259 big league games. In 681 at-bats, he struck out 89 times and walked 25 times.

In the minors, he hit .276 with 129 home runs and 233 doubles in 1195 games.

He married Colette Penhoet in April 1955. Walters died in San Ramon, California on January 26, 2010.
