= 1960 Los Angeles Dodgers season =

1960 Los Angeles Dodgers
- League: National League
- Ballpark: Los Angeles Memorial Coliseum
- City: Los Angeles
- Record: 82–72 (.532)
- Divisional place: 4th
- Owners: Walter O'Malley, James & Dearie Mulvey
- President: Walter O'Malley
- General managers: Buzzie Bavasi
- Managers: Walter Alston
- Television: KTTV, Ch. 11
- Radio: KFI; Vin Scully, Jerry Doggett; KWKW; René Cárdenas, Jaime Jarrín, Miguel Alonzo

The 1960 Los Angeles Dodgers season was the 71st season for the Los Angeles Dodgers franchise in Major League Baseball (MLB), their 3rd season in Los Angeles, California, and their 3rd season playing their home games at Los Angeles Memorial Coliseum in Los Angeles California. The Dodgers finished the season at 82–72, in fourth place in the National League race, 13 games behind the NL and World Champion Pittsburgh Pirates.

== Offseason ==
- November 30, 1959: Steve Bilko was drafted from the Dodgers by the Detroit Tigers in the 1959 rule 5 draft.

== Regular season ==
=== Season standings ===
National League
Team	W	L	Pct.	GB	Home	Road
Pittsburgh Pirates	95	59	.617	—	52‍–‍25	43‍–‍34
Milwaukee Braves	88	66	.571	7	51‍–‍26	37‍–‍40
St. Louis Cardinals	86	68	.558	9	51‍–‍26	35‍–‍42
Los Angeles Dodgers	82	72	.532	13	42‍–‍35	40‍–‍37
San Francisco Giants	79	75	.513	16	45‍–‍32	34‍–‍43
Cincinnati Reds	67	87	.435	28	37‍–‍40	30‍–‍47
Chicago Cubs	60	94	.390	35	33‍–‍44	27‍–‍50
Philadelphia Phillies	59	95	.383	36	31‍–‍46	28‍–‍49

=== Record vs. opponents ===
1960 National League record Sources:
Team	CHC	CIN	LAD	MIL	PHI	PIT	SF	STL
Chicago	—	10–12	9–13	7–15	10–12	7–15	9–13–1	8–14–1
Cincinnati	12–10	—	12–10	9–13	9–13	6–16	11–11	8–14
Los Angeles	13–9	10–12	—	12–10	16–6	11–11	10–12	10–12
Milwaukee	15–7	13–9	10–12	—	16–6	9–13	14–8	11–11
Philadelphia	12–10	13–9	6–16	6–16	—	7–15	8–14	7–15
Pittsburgh	15–7	16–6	11–11	13–9	15–7	—	14–8–1	11–11
San Francisco	13–9–1	11–11	12–10	8–14	14–8	8–14–1	—	13–9
St. Louis	14–8–1	14–8	12–10	11–11	15–7	11–11	9–13	—

=== Notable transactions ===
- April 5, 1960: Fred Kipp was traded by the Dodgers to the New York Yankees for Gordie Windhorn and Dick Sanders.
- April 8, 1960: Don Zimmer was traded by the Dodgers to the Chicago Cubs for Ron Perranoski, Johnny Goryl, career minor leaguer Lee Handley, and cash.
- April 11, 1960: Johnny Klippstein was purchased from the Dodgers by the Cleveland Indians.
- May 6, 1960: Rip Repulski was traded by the Dodgers to the Boston Red Sox for Nelson Chittum.
- May 7, 1960: Sandy Amorós was traded by the Dodgers (from the minor-league Montreal Royals) to the Detroit Tigers for Gail Harris.
- June 15, 1960: John Glenn was traded by the Dodgers to the St. Louis Cardinals for Jim Donohue.
- June 15, 1960: Clem Labine was traded by the Dodgers to the Detroit Tigers for Ray Semproch and cash.
- July 9, 1960: Tommy Lasorda was released by the Dodgers (from the minor-league Montreal Royals).

=== Opening Day lineup ===
Opening Day starters
#	Name	Position
19	Jim Gilliam	3B
43	Charlie Neal	2B
9	Wally Moon	LF
4	Duke Snider	RF
14	Gil Hodges	1B
8	John Roseboro	C
2	Don Demeter	CF
30	Maury Wills	SS
53	Don Drysdale	P

=== Roster ===
1960 Los Angeles Dodgers
Roster
Pitchers: 38 Roger Craig; 53 Don Drysdale; 41 Jim Golden; 32 Sandy Koufax; 41 Clem Labine; 16 Danny McDevitt; 17 Phil Ortega; 23 Ed Palmquist; 22 Johnny Podres; 15,21 Ed Rakow; 37 Ed Roebuck; 51 Larry Sherry; 40 Stan Williams	Catchers: 35 Doug Camilli; 58 Joe Pignatano; 8 John Roseboro; 34 Norm Sherry; Infielders: 28 Bob Aspromonte; 19 Jim Gilliam; 14 Gil Hodges; 5 Norm Larker; 11 Bob Lillis; 43 Charlie Neal; 18 Charley Smith; 30 Maury Wills	Outfielders: 18 Sandy Amorós; 12 Tommy Davis; 26 Willie Davis; 2 Don Demeter; 29 Chuck Essegian; 44 Ron Fairly; 6 Carl Furillo; 25 Frank Howard; 9 Wally Moon; 20 Rip Repulski; 4 Duke Snider; Other batters: 15 Irv Noren	Manager: 24 Walter Alston; Coaches: 33 Joe Becker; 10 Bobby Bragan; 31 Greg Mulleavy; 27 Pete Reiser

== Game log ==
=== Regular season ===
Legend
	Dodgers win
	Dodgers loss
	Postponement
	Eliminated from playoff race
**Bold**	Dodgers team member

1960 regular season game log: 82–72 (Home: 42–35; Away: 40–37)
April: 8–7 (Home: 5–3; Away: 3–4)

#	Date	Time (PT)	Opponent	Score	Win	Loss	Save	Time of Game	Attendance	Record	Box/ Streak

May: 12–14 (Home: 4–8; Away: 8–6)

#	Date	Time (PT)	Opponent	Score	Win	Loss	Save	Time of Game	Attendance	Record	Box/ Streak

June: 13–14 (Home: 7–10; Away: 6–4)

#	Date	Time (PT)	Opponent	Score	Win	Loss	Save	Time of Game	Attendance	Record	Box/ Streak

July: 19–7 (Home: 14–4; Away: 5–3)

#	Date	Time (PT)	Opponent	Score	Win	Loss	Save	Time of Game	Attendance	Record	Box/ Streak

August: 15–15 (Home: 5–5; Away: 10–10)

#	Date	Time (PT)	Opponent	Score	Win	Loss	Save	Time of Game	Attendance	Record	Box/ Streak

September: 14–14 (Home: 6–4; Away: 8–10)

#	Date	Time (PT)	Opponent	Score	Win	Loss	Save	Time of Game	Attendance	Record	Box/ Streak

October: 1–1 (Home: 1–1; Away: 0–0)

#	Date	Time (PT)	Opponent	Score	Win	Loss	Save	Time of Game	Attendance	Record	Box/ Streak

== Player stats ==
=== Batting ===
==== Starters by position ====
Note: Pos = Position; G = Games played; AB = At bats; H = Hits; Avg. = Batting average; HR = Home runs; RBI = Runs batted in

Pos	Player	G	AB	H	Avg.	HR	RBI
C	John Roseboro	103	287	61	.213	8	42
1B	Norm Larker	133	440	142	.323	5	78
2B	Charlie Neal	139	477	122	.256	8	40
SS	Maury Wills	148	516	152	.295	0	27
3B	Jim Gilliam	151	557	138	.248	5	40
LF	Wally Moon	138	469	140	.299	13	69
CF	Tommy Davis	110	352	97	.276	11	44
RF	Frank Howard	117	448	120	.268	23	77

==== Other batters ====
Note: G = Games played; AB = At bats; H = Hits; Avg. = Batting average; HR = Home runs; RBI = Runs batted in

Player	G	AB	H	Avg.	HR	RBI
Duke Snider	101	235	57	.243	14	36
Gil Hodges	101	197	39	.198	8	30
Don Demeter	64	168	46	.274	9	29
Norm Sherry	47	138	39	.283	8	19
Joe Pignatano	58	90	21	.233	2	9
Willie Davis	22	88	28	.318	2	10
Chuck Essegian	52	79	17	.215	3	11
Charley Smith	18	60	10	.167	0	5
Bob Lillis	48	60	16	.267	0	6
Bob Aspromonte	21	55	10	.182	1	6
Ron Fairly	14	37	4	.108	1	3
Irv Noren	26	25	5	.200	1	1
Doug Camilli	6	24	8	.333	1	3
Sandy Amorós	9	14	2	.143	0	0
Carl Furillo	8	10	2	.200	0	1
Rip Repulski	4	5	1	.200	0	0

=== Pitching ===
==== Starting pitchers ====
Note: G = Games pitched; IP = Innings pitched; W = Wins; L = Losses; ERA = Earned run average; SO = Strikeouts

Player	G	IP	W	L	ERA	SO
Don Drysdale	41	269.0	15	14	2.84	246
Johnny Podres	34	227.2	14	12	3.08	159
Stan Williams	38	207.1	14	10	3.00	175
Sandy Koufax	37	175.0	8	13	3.91	197
Roger Craig	21	115.2	8	3	3.27	69
Jim Golden	1	7.0	1	0	6.43	4

==== Other pitchers ====
Note: G = Games pitched; IP = Innings pitched; W = Wins; L = Losses; ERA = Earned run average; SO = Strikeouts

Player	G	IP	W	L	ERA	SO
Danny McDevitt	24	53.0	0	4	4.25	30
Ed Rakow	9	22.0	0	1	7.36	9
Phil Ortega	3	6.1	0	0	17.05	4

==== Relief pitchers ====
Note: G = Games pitched; W = Wins; L = Losses; SV = Saves; ERA = Earned run average; SO = Strikeouts

Player	G	W	L	SV	ERA	SO
Ed Roebuck	58	8	3	8	2.78	77
Larry Sherry	57	14	10	7	3.79	114
Ed Palmquist	22	0	1	0	2.54	23
Clem Labine	13	0	1	1	5.82	15

== Awards and honors ==
- 1960 Major League Baseball All-Star Game – Game 1
  - Norm Larker reserve
  - Charlie Neal reserve
  - Stan Williams reserve
  - Johnny Podres reserve
- 1960 Major League Baseball All-Star Game – Game 2
  - Norm Larker reserve
  - Charlie Neal reserve
  - Stan Williams reserve
  - Johnny Podres reserve
- National League Rookie of the Year
  - Frank Howard
- Gold Glove Award
  - Wally Moon
- TSN Rookie of the Year Award
  - Frank Howard
- NL Player of the Month
  - Don Drysdale (July 1960)

== Farm system ==
Level	Team	League	Manager
AAA	Montreal Royals	International League	Clay Bryant
AAA	Spokane Indians	Pacific Coast League	Preston Gómez
AAA	St. Paul Saints	American Association	Danny Ozark
AA	Atlanta Crackers	Southern Association	Rube Walker
A	Macon Dodgers	South Atlantic League	Ray Perry
B	Green Bay Bluejays	Illinois–Indiana–Iowa League	Stan Wasiak
C	Great Falls Electrics	Pioneer League	Spider Jorgensen
C	Reno Silver Sox	California League	Tom Saffell
D	Kokomo Dodgers	Midwest League	Al Ronning
D	Odessa Dodgers	Sophomore League	Edward Serrano
D	Orlando Dodgers	Florida State League	Brandy Davis
D	Panama City Fliers	Alabama–Florida League	Roy Hartsfield

LEAGUE CHAMPIONS: Atlanta, Reno
