= 1960 Chicago Cubs season =

1960 Chicago Cubs
- League: National League
- Ballpark: Wrigley Field
- City: Chicago
- Record: 60–94 (.390)
- League place: 7th
- Owners: Philip K. Wrigley
- General managers: John Holland
- Managers: Charlie Grimm, Lou Boudreau
- Television: WGN-TV (Jack Brickhouse, Vince Lloyd)
- Radio: WGN (Jack Quinlan, Lou Boudreau)

The 1960 Chicago Cubs season was the 89th season of the franchise, the 85th season in the National League and the 45th season at Wrigley Field. The Cubs finished seventh in the eight-team National League with a record of 60–94, 35 games behind the NL and World Series champion Pittsburgh Pirates. The Cubs drew 809,770 fans to Wrigley Field, also seventh in the circuit.

The 1960 Cubs were managed by two men, Charlie Grimm and Lou Boudreau. Grimm, 61, began his third different tenure as the team's pilot at the outset of the season, but after only 17 games he swapped jobs on May 4 with Cubs' broadcaster Boudreau. On that day, the Cubs were 6–11 and in seventh place, six games behind Pittsburgh. Boudreau, 42, managed the Cubs for the season's final 137 contests, posting a 54–83 (.394) mark. The team avoided the cellar by only one game over the tailend Philadelphia Phillies.

== Offseason ==
- October 8, 1959: Randy Jackson was released by the Cubs.
- October 30, 1959: Del Rice was signed as a free agent by the Cubs.
- December 6, 1959: Lee Walls, Lou Jackson, and Bill Henry were traded by the Cubs to the Cincinnati Reds for Frank Thomas.

== Regular season ==
=== Season standings ===
National League
Team	W	L	Pct.	GB	Home	Road
Pittsburgh Pirates	95	59	.617	—	52‍–‍25	43‍–‍34
Milwaukee Braves	88	66	.571	7	51‍–‍26	37‍–‍40
St. Louis Cardinals	86	68	.558	9	51‍–‍26	35‍–‍42
Los Angeles Dodgers	82	72	.532	13	42‍–‍35	40‍–‍37
San Francisco Giants	79	75	.513	16	45‍–‍32	34‍–‍43
Cincinnati Reds	67	87	.435	28	37‍–‍40	30‍–‍47
Chicago Cubs	60	94	.390	35	33‍–‍44	27‍–‍50
Philadelphia Phillies	59	95	.383	36	31‍–‍46	28‍–‍49

=== Record vs. opponents ===
1960 National League record Sources:
Team	CHC	CIN	LAD	MIL	PHI	PIT	SF	STL
Chicago	—	10–12	9–13	7–15	10–12	7–15	9–13–1	8–14–1
Cincinnati	12–10	—	12–10	9–13	9–13	6–16	11–11	8–14
Los Angeles	13–9	10–12	—	12–10	16–6	11–11	10–12	10–12
Milwaukee	15–7	13–9	10–12	—	16–6	9–13	14–8	11–11
Philadelphia	12–10	13–9	6–16	6–16	—	7–15	8–14	7–15
Pittsburgh	15–7	16–6	11–11	13–9	15–7	—	14–8–1	11–11
San Francisco	13–9–1	11–11	12–10	8–14	14–8	8–14–1	—	13–9
St. Louis	14–8–1	14–8	12–10	11–11	15–7	11–11	9–13	—

=== Notable transactions ===
- April 8, 1960: Ron Perranoski, Johnny Goryl, Lee Handley (minors), and $25,000 were traded by the Cubs to the Los Angeles Dodgers for Don Zimmer.
- May 13, 1960: Tony Taylor and Cal Neeman were traded by the Cubs to the Philadelphia Phillies for Don Cardwell and Ed Bouchee.
- June 4, 1960: Del Rice was released by the Cubs.
- July 15, 1960: Earl Averill and $30,000 were traded by the Cubs to the Milwaukee Braves for Al Heist.

== Roster ==
1960 Chicago Cubs
Roster
Pitchers: 32 Bob Anderson; 45 Jim Brewer; 34 Dick Burwell; 43 Don Cardwell; 41 Art Ceccarelli; 39 Moe Drabowsky; 30 Dick Drott; 37 Dick Ellsworth; 36 Don Elston; 31 Mark Freeman; 31 John Goetz; 40 Glen Hobbie; 45 Ben Johnson; 38 Seth Morehead; 46 Joe Schaffernoth; 43 Al Schroll; 45 Mel Wright	Catchers: 6 Earl Averill; 6 Dick Bertell; 9 Jim Hegan; 11 Cal Neeman; 9 Del Rice; 2 El Tappe; 15 Sammy Taylor; 22 Moe Thacker; Infielders: 14 Ernie Banks; 11 Ed Bouchee; 19 Sammy Drake; 12 Dick Gernert; 20 Grady Hatton; 16 Jerry Kindall; 6 Jim McKnight; 20 Irv Noren; 15,10 Ron Santo; 5 Tony Taylor; 25 Frank Thomas; 17 Don Zimmer	Outfielders: 21 George Altman; 1 Richie Ashburn; 18 Al Heist; 33 Lou Johnson; 12 Nelson Mathews; 7 Walt Moryn; 20,42 Danny Murphy; 23 Art Schult; 28 Bob Will; 41 Billy Williams	Manager: 50 Charlie Grimm; 42,5 Lou Boudreau; Coaches: 3 Harry Craft; 20 Grady Hatton; 9 Jim Hegan; 4 Vedie Himsl; 3 Lou Klein; 4 Charlie Root; 2 El Tappe

== Player stats ==
= Indicates team leader

= Indicates league leader

=== Batting ===
==== Starters by position ====
Note: Pos = Position; G = Games played; AB = At bats; H = Hits; Avg. = Batting average; HR = Home runs; RBI = Runs batted in

Pos	Player	G	AB	H	Avg.	HR	RBI
C	El Tappe	51	103	24	.233	0	3
1B	Ed Bouchee	98	299	71	.237	5	44
2B	Jerry Kindall	89	246	59	.240	2	23
SS	Ernie Banks	156	597	162	.271	41	117
3B	Ron Santo	95	347	87	.251	9	44
LF	Frank Thomas	135	479	114	.238	21	64
CF	Richie Ashburn	151	547	159	.291	0	40
RF	Bob Will	138	475	121	.255	6	53

==== Other batters ====
Note: G = Games played; AB = At bats; H = Hits; Avg. = Batting average; HR = Home runs; RBI = Runs batted in

Player	G	AB	H	Avg.	HR	RBI
Don Zimmer	132	368	95	.258	6	35
George Altman	119	334	89	.266	13	51
Sammy Taylor	74	150	31	.207	3	17
Walt Moryn	38	109	32	.294	2	11
Earl Averill	52	102	24	.235	1	13
Al Heist	41	102	28	.275	1	6
Dick Gernert	52	96	24	.250	0	11
Moe Thacker	54	90	14	.156	0	6
Tony Taylor	19	76	20	.263	1	9
Danny Murphy	31	75	9	.120	1	6
Lou Johnson	34	68	14	.206	0	1
Del Rice	18	52	12	.231	0	4
Billy Williams	12	47	13	.277	2	7
Jim Hegan	24	43	9	.209	1	5
Grady Hatton	28	38	13	.342	0	7
Dick Bertell	5	15	2	.133	0	2
Sammy Drake	15	15	1	.067	0	0
Art Schult	12	15	2	.133	0	1
Cal Neeman	9	13	2	.154	0	0
Irv Noren	12	11	1	.091	0	1
Nelson Mathews	3	8	2	.250	0	0
Jim McKnight	3	6	2	.333	0	1

=== Pitching ===
==== Starting pitchers ====
Note: G = Games pitched; IP = Innings pitched; W = Wins; L = Losses; ERA = Earned run average; SO = Strikeouts

Player	G	IP	W	L	ERA	SO
Glen Hobbie	46	258.2	16	20	3.97	134
Bob Anderson	38	203.2	9	11	4.11	115
Don Cardwell	31	177.0	8	14	4.37	129
Dick Ellsworth	31	176.2	7	13	3.72	94
Jim Brewer	5	21.2	0	3	5.82	7

==== Other pitchers ====
Note: G = Games pitched; IP = Innings pitched; W = Wins; L = Losses; ERA = Earned run average; SO = Strikeouts

Player	G	IP	W	L	ERA	SO
Seth Morehead	45	123.1	2	9	3.94	64
Mark Freeman	30	76.2	3	3	5.63	50
Dick Drott	23	55.1	0	6	7.16	32
Art Ceccarelli	7	13.0	0	0	5.54	10
Dick Burwell	3	9.2	0	0	5.59	1

==== Relief pitchers ====
Note: G = Games pitched; W = Wins; L = Losses; SV = Saves; ERA = Earned run average; SO = Strikeouts

Player	G	W	L	SV	ERA	SO
Don Elston	60	8	9	10	3.40	85
Joe Schaffernoth	33	2	3	3	2.78	33
Moe Drabowsky	32	3	1	1	6.44	26
Ben Johnson	17	2	1	1	4.91	9
Mel Wright	9	0	1	2	4.96	8
John Goetz	4	0	0	0	12.79	6
Al Schroll	2	0	0	0	10.13	2

== Awards and honors ==
- Ernie Banks, National League Home Run Champion

All-Star Game

- Ernie Banks, Starter, First and Second Game

== Farm system ==
Level	Team	League	Manager
AAA	Houston Buffaloes	American Association	Enos Slaughter
AA	San Antonio Missions	Texas League	Grady Hatton and Lou Klein
A	Lancaster Red Roses	Eastern League	Phil Cavarretta
C	St. Cloud Rox	Northern League	Fred Martin
D	Morristown Cubs	Appalachian League	Nelvin Cooper
D	Carlsbad Potashers	Sophomore League	Verlon Walker
