= Hank Mason =

American baseball player (1931–2020)

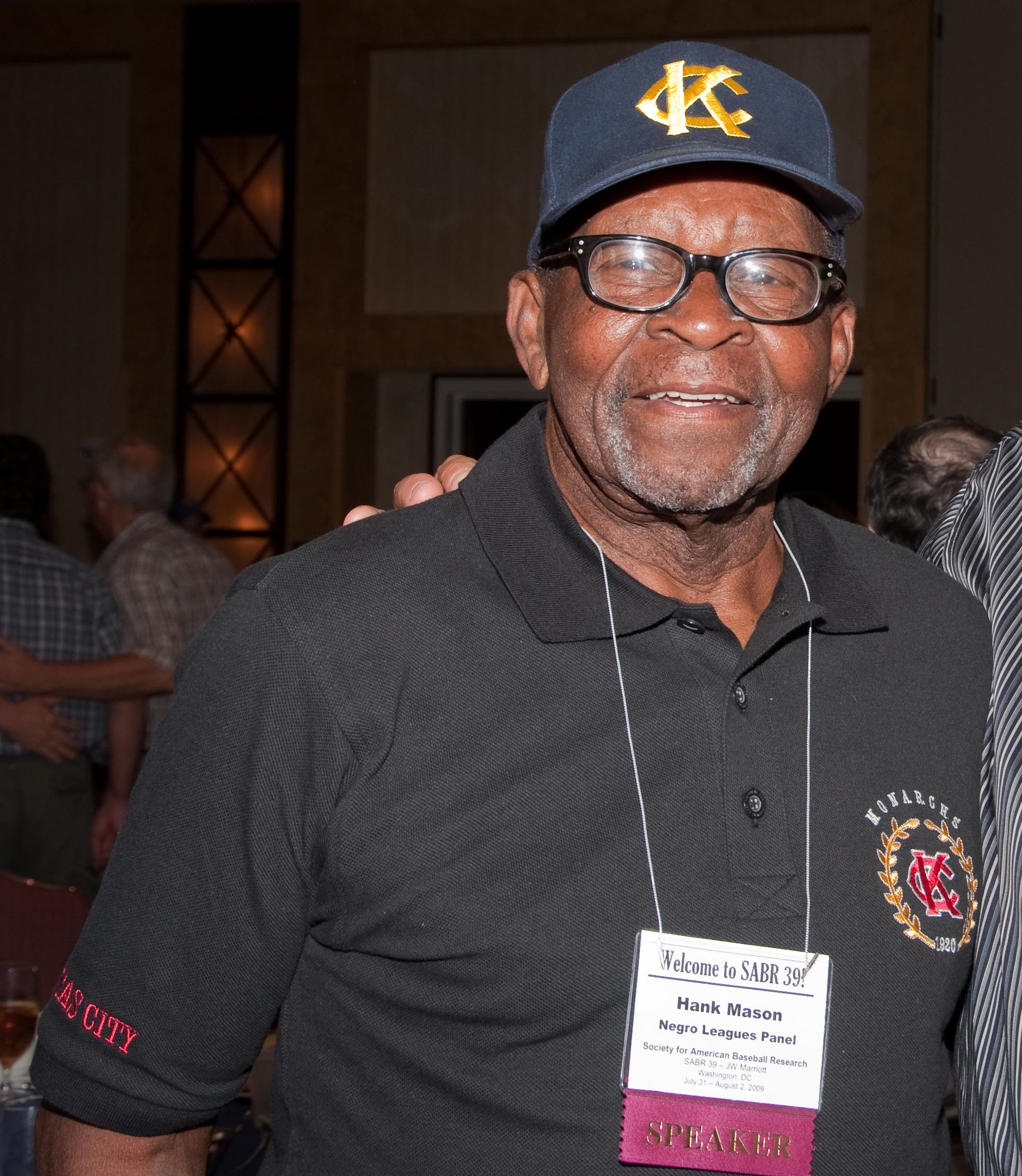
- Hank Mason in 2009
- Pitcher
- Born: June 19, 1931; Marshall, Missouri
- Died: May 29, 2020 (aged 88)
- Batted: Right Threw: Right

MLB debut
- September 12, 1958, for the Philadelphia Phillies

Last MLB appearance
- April 24, 1960, for the Philadelphia Phillies

MLB statistics
- Win–loss record: 0–0
- Earned run average: 10.13
- Strikeouts: 6
- Innings pitched: 10 2/3
- Stats at Baseball Reference

Teams
- Philadelphia Phillies (1958, 1960)

Henry Mason (June 19, 1931 – May 29, 2020) was an American professional baseball player. Mason was a 6 ft (1.83 m), 185 lb (84 kg) right-handed pitcher whose eight-season (1955–62) minor league career included brief stints as a relief pitcher with the 1958 and 1960 Philadelphia Phillies of Major League Baseball. He began his career with the Kansas City Monarchs of the Negro American League, and was the starting pitcher in the 1954 East-West Game.

Mason was largely successful as a pitcher in the Phillies' farm system, posting 14- and 15-victory seasons in the Eastern League in 1955–56, and a 12–3 record in the International League in 1959. However, Mason's MLB debut was not auspicious. On September 12, 1958, he appeared in a one-sided Phillie loss, a 19–2 defeat at the hands of the San Francisco Giants at Connie Mack Stadium. Mason entered the game in the second inning as the Phils' third pitcher of the day — and with the Giants already ahead, 8–0. He went the next five frames and surrendered seven hits and six earned runs, although he only allowed two extra-base blows, both doubles. He made three more appearances at the start of the 1960 Phils' season.

All told, Mason allowed 12 earned runs in four games played and 10 2/3 Major League innings, yielding 16 hits and seven bases on balls. He struck out six. In the minors, he won 60 of 106 decisions for a .556 winning percentage.

Following his baseball career, Mason was a clergyman in Richmond, Virginia. He died on May 29, 2020.
