= Fred McAlister =

American baseball player and scout

- Infielder / Scout
- Born: March 1, 1928; Lynchburg, Virginia, U.S.
- Died: November 23, 2008 (aged 80); Katy, Texas, U.S.
- Batted: Right Threw: Right
- Stats at Baseball Reference

Teams
- Director of scouting: St. Louis Cardinals (1980–1993)

Fred Early McAlister Jr. (March 1, 1928 – November 23, 2008) was an American minor league baseball player and later a scout and front-office executive in Major League Baseball (MLB) who spent 63 years in the St. Louis Cardinals organization. He served as the team's director of scouting from 1980 until 1993.

== Biography ==
McAlister was signed by the St. Louis Cardinals out of high school. He played in the team's farm system during 1945 and from 1948 through 1960; he did not play professionally in 1946 or 1947 due to military service in the United States Navy. Listed at 6 feet 1 inch (1.85 m) and 185 pounds (84 kg), he batted and threw right-handed. During 1155 minor league games, he had appearances at all infield positions and also in left field. He was player-manager of the Dothan Cardinals in his final season as a player, 1960.

After his playing career, McAlister was the Cardinals' assistant farm director from 1967 to 1969. From 1969 until 1979, he was the scouting supervisor and special assignment scout for the Cardinals. McAlister was the scouting director for the Cardinals from 1980 to 1993. In this role, he achieved a string of successful draft picks, with 12 of 13 of the team's first round draft picks in the amateur draft making it to Major League Baseball. From 1981 through 1987, all seven of the team's picks made it to the majors, which were infielder Bobby Meacham (1981), pitcher Todd Worrell (1982), outfielder-first baseman Jim Lindeman (1983), pitcher Mike Dunne (1984), pitcher Joe Magrane (1985), infielder Luis Alicea (1986) and pitcher Cris Carpenter (1987). Whitey Herzog, who had managed the team from 1980 to 1990, noted McAlister's ability to find talent, stating that "Every year we'd be picking between 15th and 22nd, but he'd always have his first-rounder get to the big leagues." 70 of the players he selected in the amateur draft played for the Cardinals and another 17 played in the majors for other teams. After stepping down as director of scouting, he remained with the team as a special assignment scout until his death.

McAlister was born on March 1, 1928, in Lynchburg, Virginia. He died at age 80 on November 23, 2008, in Katy, Texas. He was survived by his wife, Patty Neal Hunter McAlister, three daughters and three step-children. McAlister was the grandfather of eleven and the great-grandfather of three.
