= John Goetz =

American baseball player (1937–2008)

- Pitcher
- Born: October 24, 1937; Goetzville, Michigan, U.S.
- Died: October 27, 2008 (aged 71); Troy, Michigan, U.S.
- Batted: Right Threw: Right

MLB debut
- April 16, 1960, for the Chicago Cubs

Last MLB appearance
- April 29, 1960, for the Chicago Cubs

MLB statistics
- Win–loss record: 0–0
- Earned run average: 12.79
- Innings pitched: 6 1/3
- Stats at Baseball Reference

Teams
- Chicago Cubs (1960)

John Hardy Goetz (October 24, 1937 – October 27, 2008) was an American professional baseball player. Despite being left handed, he was a right-handed pitcher. He appeared in four games for the 1960 Chicago Cubs of Major League Baseball, but had an 11-year career in minor league baseball. A native of Goetzville, Michigan, he stood 6 feet (1.8 m) tall, weighed 185 pounds (84 kg) and attended Western Michigan University.

Goetz' Major League trial came at the outset of the 1960 Cubs' season. He made the team's 28-man early-season roster out of spring training and appeared as a relief pitcher in four contests. In his MLB debut, against the San Francisco Giants, he was effective, hurling 2 2/3 innings of scoreless relief. But he was treated roughly in outings against the Giants the following week and against the St. Louis Cardinals in his last appearance, and was returned to the minors, where he spent the rest of his career. He retired from professional baseball after the 1965 season and 333 games played in the minors.

In 6 1/3 Major League innings, Goetz allowed nine earned runs, ten hits and four bases on balls. He struck out six.
