= Tony González (baseball) =

Cuban baseball player (1936–2021)

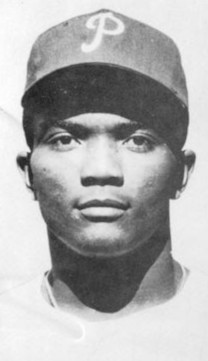
- Outfielder
- Born: August 28, 1936; Central Cunagua, Cuba
- Died: July 2, 2021 (aged 84); Cutler Bay, Florida, U.S.
- Batted: Left Threw: Right

MLB debut
- April 12, 1960, for the Cincinnati Reds

Last MLB appearance
- September 4, 1971, for the California Angels

MLB statistics
- Batting average: .286
- Home runs: 103
- Runs batted in: 615
- Stats at Baseball Reference

Teams
- Cincinnati Reds (1960); Philadelphia Phillies (1960–1968); San Diego Padres (1969); Atlanta Braves (1969–1970); California Angels (1970–1971); Hiroshima Toyo Carp (1972)

Andrés Antonio "Tony" González (August 28, 1936 – July 2, 2021) was a Cuban professional baseball outfielder, who played in Major League Baseball (MLB) for the Cincinnati Reds (1960), Philadelphia Phillies (1960–1968), San Diego Padres (1969), Atlanta Braves (1969–1970), and California Angels (1970–1971).

== Career ==
A fine center fielder, González spent his best years with the Phillies. He had an average, though accurate, arm with excellent range. As a hitter, González batted for average with occasional power, drew a significant number of walks, was a good bunter, and had enough power to collect an above-average number of doubles and triples. He hit a career-high 20 home runs in 1962; then, in 1963, González had career-highs in doubles (36) and triples (12), to place third and second, respectively, in the National League (NL). In 1967, his career-high .339 batting average was second only to Roberto Clemente’s .357 for the NL batting crown, which also ranked second in the major leagues.

In his twelve-season MLB career, González hit .286 (1,485-for-5,195), with 103 home runs, 615 runs batted in (RBI), 690 runs, 238 doubles, 57 triples, and 79 stolen bases, in 1,559 games. Defensively, he recorded a .987 fielding percentage, while playing at all three outfield positions.

In the 1969 National League Championship Series against the New York Mets, González hit .357, with two RBI, one double, four runs, and one homer (off Tom Seaver). Following his big league career, González played part of the 1972 season for the Hiroshima Toyo Carp of Nippon Professional Baseball (NPB.)

During the 1964 season, González was the first MLB player to wear a batting helmet with a pre-molded ear-flap. He was in the NL top-ten in being hit by pitches, and the special helmet was constructed specifically for his use.

González died on July 2, 2021, at the age of 84.
