= Ted Lepcio =

American baseball player (1929–2019)

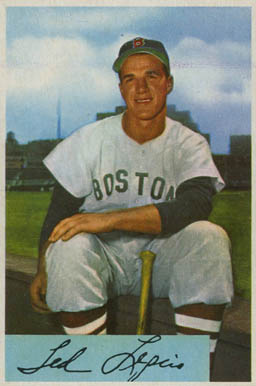
- Infielder
- Born: July 28, 1929; Utica, New York, U.S.
- Died: December 11, 2019 (aged 90); Dedham, Massachusetts, U.S.
- Batted: Right Threw: Right

MLB debut
- April 15, 1952, for the Boston Red Sox

Last MLB appearance
- September 11, 1961, for the Minnesota Twins

MLB statistics
- Batting average: .245
- Home runs: 69
- Runs batted in: 251
- Stats at Baseball Reference

Teams
- Boston Red Sox (1952–1959); Detroit Tigers (1959); Philadelphia Phillies (1960); Chicago White Sox (1961); Minnesota Twins (1961)

Thaddeus Stanley "Ted" Lepcio (July 28, 1929 – December 11, 2019) was an American professional baseball utility infielder, who played in Major League Baseball (MLB) for the Boston Red Sox, Detroit Tigers, Philadelphia Phillies, Chicago White Sox, and Minnesota Twins.

Lepcio attended Seton Hall University. A one-time semi-professional baseball player in Oneida, New York, he was signed by the Boston Red Sox, as an amateur free agent, in 1951. Lepcio played his first MLB game, in 1952, and would play most of his professional career with the Red Sox. He was generally a utility infielder who could play second base, third base, or shortstop. Lepcio's best year was 1956, when he hit 15 home runs, nine of which came in an eighteen-day stretch. He is mentioned in Jimmy Piersall's book, Fear Strikes Out, as his roommate during the 1952 season, when Piersall had to be hospitalized with mental issues. Lepcio often saved Piersall from being beaten up by his own teammates.

On July 13, 1961, Lepcio hit a grand slam in the first inning against the Cleveland Indians, which would turn out to be the deciding factor in the Twins' 9 to 6 victory.

Lepcio played his last game on September 11, 1961, as a ninth-inning replacement at third base. For the rest of the season, back problems, which required traction and surgery, kept him on the bench. Lepcio was released by the Twins on October 25.

He was immediately signed by the expansion New York Mets but was released the following April before the season started. Lepcio holds the distinction of being the very first "free agent" signed to a contract by the New York Mets.

After Lepcio retired, following the 1961 season, he became a vice president of sales with St Johnsbury Trucking Co Inc, a New England trucking company. He also remained active in baseball and often chaired Red Sox events. He died on December 11, 2019, in Dedham, Massachusetts.
