= Ron Piché =

Canadian baseball player (1935–2011)

- Relief pitcher
- Born: May 22, 1935; Verdun, Quebec, Canada
- Died: February 3, 2011 (aged 75); Montreal, Quebec, Canada
- Batted: Right Threw: Right

MLB debut
- May 30, 1960, for the Milwaukee Braves

Last MLB appearance
- September 26, 1966, for the St. Louis Cardinals

MLB statistics
- Win–loss record: 10–16
- Earned run average: 4.19
- Strikeouts: 157
- Stats at Baseball Reference

Teams
- Milwaukee Braves (1960–1963); Los Angeles Angels (1965); St. Louis Cardinals (1966)

Member of the Canadian

Baseball Hall of Fame
- Induction: 1988

Ronald Jacques Piché (May 22, 1935 – February 3, 2011) was a Canadian professional baseball pitcher who played in Major League Baseball (MLB) for the Milwaukee Braves, Los Angeles Angels and St. Louis Cardinals. A native of Verdun, Quebec, he threw and batted right-handed and was listed as 5 feet 11 inches (1.80 m) tall and 165 pounds (75 kg).

== Biography ==
Piché's professional pitching career lasted for 17 seasons between 1955 and 1972 (sitting out the 1971 campaign), and included 134 games played in the majors. Only in 1963, when he worked in 37 games for Braves, all but one of them out of the bullpen, did he spend a full campaign at the major league level. All told, Piché had a 10–16 win–loss record with 12 saves. Although he started only 11 of his 134 career MLB games pitched, he threw three complete games. In 221 1/3 innings pitched, he allowed 216 hits and 123 bases on balls, with 157 strikeouts, while posting a career 4.19 earned run average (ERA).

Piché appeared in 500 minor league baseball games, compiling a 130–65 career record (.667 winning percentage) with an ERA of 2.96. After retiring from the mound, he served in the Montreal Expos organization as a minor league coach, an administrator in their ticket office, and as the Expos' bullpen coach in 1976 under managers Karl Kuehl and Charlie Fox.

One of Piché's best days in the major leagues occurred on May 30, 1962. He was the starting pitcher for the Braves in the first game of a doubleheader against the Cincinnati Reds. He pitched a complete game, allowing six hits, and also got his first and only major league hit. In the last of the fourth inning, with two outs and runners on first and second, he hit a single to shortstop Leo Cárdenas, driving in two runs and reaching second on an error by Cárdenas. The Braves won the game, 4–3.

During his time in the major leagues, Piché was a teammate of at least eight National Baseball Hall of Fame players: Hank Aaron, Eddie Mathews, Red Schoendienst, Warren Spahn, Lou Brock, Steve Carlton, Orlando Cepeda and Bob Gibson.

Piché was also a volunteer firefighter with the Montreal Auxiliary Firemen. He was inducted to the Canadian Baseball Hall of Fame in 1988. He died of cancer on February 3, 2011, at age 75.
