= Gino Cimoli =

American baseball player (1929–2011)

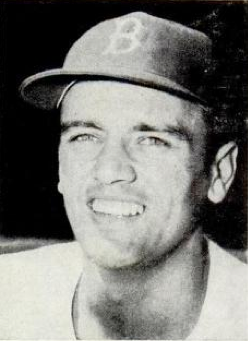
- Cimoli in 1957
- Outfielder
- Born: December 18, 1929; San Francisco, California, U.S.
- Died: February 12, 2011 (aged 81); Roseville, California, U.S.
- Batted: Right Threw: Right

MLB debut
- April 19, 1956, for the Brooklyn Dodgers

Last MLB appearance
- May 7, 1965, for the Los Angeles Angels

MLB statistics
- Batting average: .265
- Home runs: 44
- Runs batted in: 321
- Stats at Baseball Reference

Teams
- Brooklyn / Los Angeles Dodgers (1956–1958); St. Louis Cardinals (1959); Pittsburgh Pirates (1960–1961); Milwaukee Braves (1961); Kansas City Athletics (1962–1964); Baltimore Orioles (1964); Los Angeles Angels (1965)

Career highlights and awards
- All-Star (1957); World Series champion (1960)

Gino Nicholas Cimoli (December 18, 1929 – February 12, 2011) was an American professional baseball outfielder. He played in Major League Baseball (MLB) for the Brooklyn / Los Angeles Dodgers, St. Louis Cardinals, Pittsburgh Pirates, Milwaukee Braves, Kansas City Athletics, Baltimore Orioles, and Los Angeles Angels from 1956 through 1965. He was an MLB All-Star in 1957, and a member of the 1960 World Series champions. He was the first major league baseball player to take an at bat in a West Coast game.

== Early life ==
Cimoli was born on December 18, 1929, in San Francisco. He was a high school All-Star at Galileo High School in San Francisco excelling in baseball and basketball. Baseball legend Joe DiMaggio also went to Galileo years earlier, as did such other major leaguers as Tony Lazzeri (part of "Murderers Row" for the 1927 Yankees), Dominic and Vince DiMaggio, and later Walt "No-Neck" Williams.

== Professional baseball career ==
He signed as an amateur free agent with the Brooklyn Dodgers in 1949. He had a six year minor-league career in the Dodgers' farm system, from 1949 to 1955, playing the majority of his games at the Triple-A level. His batting average was .300 or better in three of four years of Triple-A ball from 1952-1955.

He would make his Major League Baseball debut with the Dodgers on April 19, 1956, but played sparingly that year. In 1957, his first full season with the Dodgers, he played in 142 games, with a career high .293 batting average, career high 10 home runs, 57 runs batted in (RBI), and career high 88 runs scored. He was selected to play in the 1957 All-Star Game.

On April 15, 1958, Cimoli became the first Major League batter to step into the batter's box on the West Coast when the Los Angeles Dodgers and the San Francisco Giants played their first game of the season at Seals Stadium in San Francisco. Dodger manager Walter Alston knew the significance of the event and that Cimoli had grown up in San Francisco's North Beach neighborhood, not far from the stadium, and chose Cimoli to be the first player to bat in major league baseball's inaugural West Coast game. Cimoli also had scored the final run at Ebbets Field the previous season, in the Dodgers last game in Brooklyn.

Cimoli's playing time was reduced in 1958 to 109 games, and he hit only .246. After the season, the Dodgers traded Cimoli to the St. Louis Cardinals for Wally Moon and Phil Paine. In 1959, he hit .297 for the Cardinals, with 61 runs scored and 72 RBIs. After the 1959 season, the Cardinals traded Cimoli to the Pittsburgh Pirates with Tom Cheney in exchange for Ron Kline.

Cimoli played on the Pirates' 1960 World Series championship team, which defeated the New York Yankees in seven games. He was primarily the Pirates' fourth outfielder in 1960, batting .267 in 101 games, sometimes platooning in center field with Bill Virdon (he played 58 games in center field that year), while also playing some in both left field (27 games) and right field (17 games). After left fielder Bob Skinner injured his thumb in Game 1 of the World Series, Cimoli started Games 2–6 in left field. Cimoli returned to the bench in Game 7 when Skinner returned.

In the eighth inning of Game 7, with the Pirates trailing 7–4, Cimoli, pinch-hitting for pitcher Roy Face, led off with a single against Bobby Shantz, advanced to second on Virdon's bad-hop grounder, which struck Yankee shortstop Tony Kubek in the throat, then scored on Dick Groat's single. This was the first run in a five-run inning to give the Pirates a 9–7 lead. The Pirates gave the lead away in the ninth before finally winning the game in the bottom half on Bill Mazeroski's lead-off home run.

Cimoli had played in 21 games for the Pirates, batting .299, when on June 15, 1961, the Pirates traded Cimoli to the Milwaukee Braves for Johnny Logan. He played in only 37 games for the Braves, batting a meager .197. The Kansas City Athletics selected Cimoli from the Braves in the Rule 5 draft after the season. In 1962, he played a full season for the Athletics, batting .275, and leading the American League in triples with 15. In 1963, he played another full season for Kansas City, batting .263 with 11 triples. The following year he played sparingly, and the Athletics released Cimoli on May 29, 1964.

He signed with the Baltimore Orioles that same day. He played in only 38 games for the Orioles, and batted .138. He was assigned to the Rochester Red Wings of the Triple-A International League, playing in 45 games with a .315 batting average. Released by the Orioles before the 1965 season, Cimoli signed with the California Angels on April 10, 1965. He appeared in his final major league game on May 7, and was released on May 14. He finished his professional career with the Spokane Indians of the Pacific Coast League, under manager, and former Dodger teammate, Duke Snider.

In 10 major league seasons, he had a .265 batting average with 808 hits and 44 home runs.

Cimoli's baseball card in 1958 (No. 286, Topps) in which the background was painted out, shows him swinging a bat, without the bat — which was also painted out. (Source: Baseball Hall of Shame 4, Nash & Zullo)

== Later life ==
After retiring from baseball, Cimoli worked as a delivery driver for United Parcel Service where, in 1990, the company honored Cimoli for completing 21 years of service without a traffic accident. Cimoli, then 60 years old and still working for the company, was now referred to as "The Lou Gehrig of UPS." It has also been reported he worked 25 years for UPS.

== Death ==
Cimoli died on February 12, 2011.

== See also ==
- List of Major League Baseball annual triples leaders
