= Joe L. Brown =

American baseball executive (1918–2010)

- Born: September 1, 1918; New York City, U.S.
- Died: August 15, 2010 (aged 91); Albuquerque, New Mexico, U.S.
- Occupation: Baseball executive
- Years active: 1939–1976; 1985

Joe LeRoy Brown (September 1, 1918 – August 15, 2010) was an American front office executive in Major League Baseball.

Brown served as the general manager of the Pittsburgh Pirates from November 1, 1955, through the end of the 1976 season. Under his administration, the Pirates recovered from four consecutive last-place finishes in the National League to world championships in 1960 and 1971. Led by the great Baseball Hall of Fame players Roberto Clemente, Bill Mazeroski and Willie Stargell, the Bucs became consistent contenders for much of Brown's 21-year tenure, finishing in the first division six times between 1956 and 1968, and capturing five National League East Division titles from 1970 through 1976.

== Early life ==
Brown was a native of New York, but grew up in Southern California. The son of actor-comedian Joe E. Brown (Some Like It Hot), he inherited his father's passion for baseball. Brown first met Branch Rickey, his predecessor in Pittsburgh, when Brown was 16 years of age, in 1935. He entered minor league baseball after his graduation from UCLA in 1939 as a front-office official with the Lubbock Hubbers of the Class D West Texas–New Mexico League. He served in the United States Army Air Forces during the World War II era, then joined the administrative staff of the Hollywood Stars of the Triple-A Pacific Coast League in 1946.

== Pittsburgh Pirates ==
Brown came to the Pittsburgh organization in 1950 as business manager of their Waco Pirates farm team in the Class B Big State League, then their New Orleans Pelicans club in the Double-A Southern Association. He joined the Pittsburgh front office in 1955, reunited with Rickey, who was in his final season as general manager.

When Rickey, 73, retired to become the club's board chairman at the close of the 1955 campaign, Brown was the unanimous choice of that board (which also included part-owner Bing Crosby) to succeed him. Brown's first order of business was to find a successor to fired skipper Fred Haney. While his first choice, Bobby Bragan, was a misfire, Brown struck gold in August 1957 when he replaced Bragan with Danny Murtaugh, a former Pirate second baseman then in his second season as a coach. Under Murtaugh, the Bucs became contenders in 1958, finishing in second place, won the 1960 and 1971 World Series, and three more NL East titles (1970; 1974–75). Although he twice was compelled to step down for health reasons, Murtaugh would serve four separate terms as Brown's field manager (1957–64; 1967; 1970–71; 1973–76), and compile a 1,115–950 (.540) record. Two months after Brown's and Murtaugh's joint retirement at the conclusion of the 1976 campaign, Murtaugh suffered a fatal stroke at age 59.

== Legacy ==
Brown maintained and built upon the scouting and player development system created during Rickey's term as the Pirates' general manager. He also swung multiple trades, acquiring players such as Harvey Haddix, Smoky Burgess, Bill Virdon, Don Hoak, Hal Smith and Vinegar Bend Mizell, who would play key roles in Pittsburgh's 1960 championship. His 1971 club was almost exclusively produced from the Pirates' strong farm system, which mined talent from the Caribbean and Latin America. Brown would frequently accompany fabled scout Howie Haak on Haak's trips to Latin America.

== Retirement ==
Brown remained in the Pirates organization as a Southern California-based scout. He came out of semi-retirement as executive vice president and general manager again on May 23, 1985 when he replaced Harding Peterson who had succeeded him after the 1976 season. At the time, the ball club was rocked by a drug scandal, poor play, falling attendance and was on the verge of being sold by the John W. Galbreath family to a local consortium. Brown returned to semi-retirement upon the appointment of Syd Thrift as his successor 5½ months later on November 7.

He died on August 15, 2010, in Albuquerque, New Mexico at age 91. He was survived by his son Don and daughter Cynthia.

Preceded by Branch Rickey	Pittsburgh Pirates General manager 1955–1976	Succeeded by Harding "Pete" Peterson
Preceded by Harding "Pete" Peterson	Pittsburgh Pirates General manager 1985 (interim)	Succeeded by Syd Thrift
