= Dick Groat =

American baseball player (1930–2023)

- Groat in Exhibit card
- Shortstop
- Born: November 4, 1930; Wilkinsburg, Pennsylvania, U.S.
- Died: April 27, 2023 (aged 92); Pittsburgh, Pennsylvania, U.S.
- Batted: Right Threw: Right

MLB debut
- June 18, 1952, for the Pittsburgh Pirates

Last MLB appearance
- October 1, 1967, for the San Francisco Giants

MLB statistics
- Batting average: .286
- Hits: 2,138
- Home runs: 39
- Runs batted in: 707
- Stats at Baseball Reference

Teams
- Pittsburgh Pirates (1952, 1955–1962); St. Louis Cardinals (1963–1965); Philadelphia Phillies (1966–1967); San Francisco Giants (1967)

Career highlights and awards
- 8× All-Star (1959–1960², 1962–1964); 2× World Series champion (1960, 1964); NL MVP (1960); NL batting champion (1960); Pittsburgh Pirates Hall of Fame
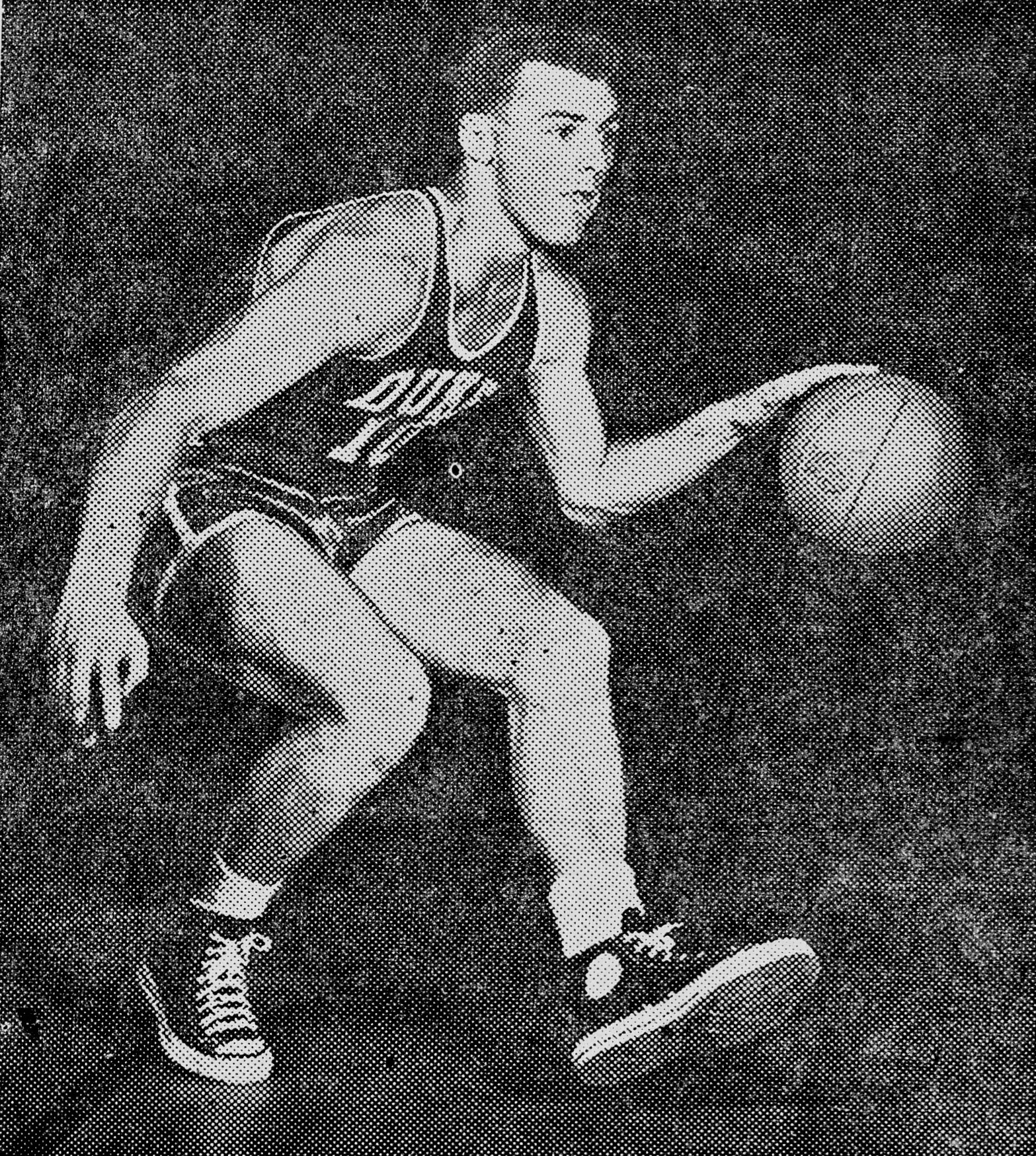
Basketball career
Groat at Duke
Personal information
Listed height	5 ft 11 in (1.80 m)
Listed weight	180 lb (82 kg)
Career information
High school	Swissvale (Swissvale, Pennsylvania)
College	Duke (1949–1952)
NBA draft	1952: 1st round, 3rd overall pick
Drafted by	Fort Wayne Pistons
Playing career	1952–1953
Position	Point guard
Number	5
Career history
1952–1953	Fort Wayne Pistons
Career highlights
UPI Player of the Year (1952); Helms Foundation Player of the Year (1951); Consensus first-team All-American (1952); Consensus second-team All-American (1951); 2× Southern Conference McKelvin Award (Male Athlete of the Year) (1951, 1952); 2× SoCon Tournament MVP (1951, 1952); No. 10 retired by Duke Blue Devils
Career NBA statistics
Points	309 (11.9 ppg)
Assists	69 (2.7 apg)
Rebounds	86 (3.3 rpg)
Stats at NBA.com
Stats at Basketball Reference
Collegiate Basketball Hall of Fame

Richard Morrow Groat (November 4, 1930 – April 27, 2023) was an American professional baseball and basketball player. He played 14 seasons in Major League Baseball (MLB), primarily as a shortstop, and was an eight-time All-Star. He won the National League Most Valuable Player Award and the league's batting title in 1960, helping the Pittsburgh Pirates win the 1960 World Series; he later won a second championship with the St. Louis Cardinals in the 1964 World Series.

Groat won the National League batting title in 1960 with a .325 average and finished his career with a .286 batting average and 2,138 hits. He played for four teams over 14 major-league seasons. From 1956 to 1962, he teamed with future Hall of Fame second baseman Bill Mazeroski to form the Pirates' double-play combination.

Groat attended Duke University, where he earned All-America honors in both baseball and basketball in 1951 and 1952. He was a two-time recipient of the Southern Conference McKelvin Award as the conference's male athlete of the year and became the first Duke basketball player to have his number (10) retired. He was inducted into the College Basketball Hall of Fame in 2007 and the National College Baseball Hall of Fame in 2011.

== Early life and education ==
Groat was born in Wilkinsburg, Pennsylvania, to Martin and Gracie Groat, the youngest of five children. He was raised in Swissvale, Pennsylvania, and attended Swissvale High School where he earned letters in basketball, baseball, and volleyball.

== College athletic career ==
Groat earned an athletic scholarship for basketball to attend Duke University where he was a two-sport star athlete. In basketball, he was a two-time college basketball All-American (1950–51, 1951–52) and one-time Helms Foundation Player of the Year recipient (1950–51). He was the Southern Conference Player of the Year as well as United Press International (UPI) National Player of the Year in the 1951–52 season, when he set an National Collegiate Athletic Association (NCAA) record, with 839 points scored.

In his final regular-season game, Groat scored 48 points against the visiting University of North Carolina, the most ever by a Tar Heels opponent. The Blue Devils won in a 94–64 rout for their 13th consecutive triumph. Victories over Maryland and West Virginia extended the streak to 15 in the Southern Conference Tournament before the Blue Devils were ousted by North Carolina State 77–68 in the championship round to fall one win short of an NCAA Tournament berth.

On May 1, 1952, Groat had his jersey number 10 retired to the rafters of Cameron Indoor Stadium on campus. It would remain the only one retired by the school for 28 years. On November 18, 2007, he was inducted into the National Collegiate Basketball Hall of Fame.

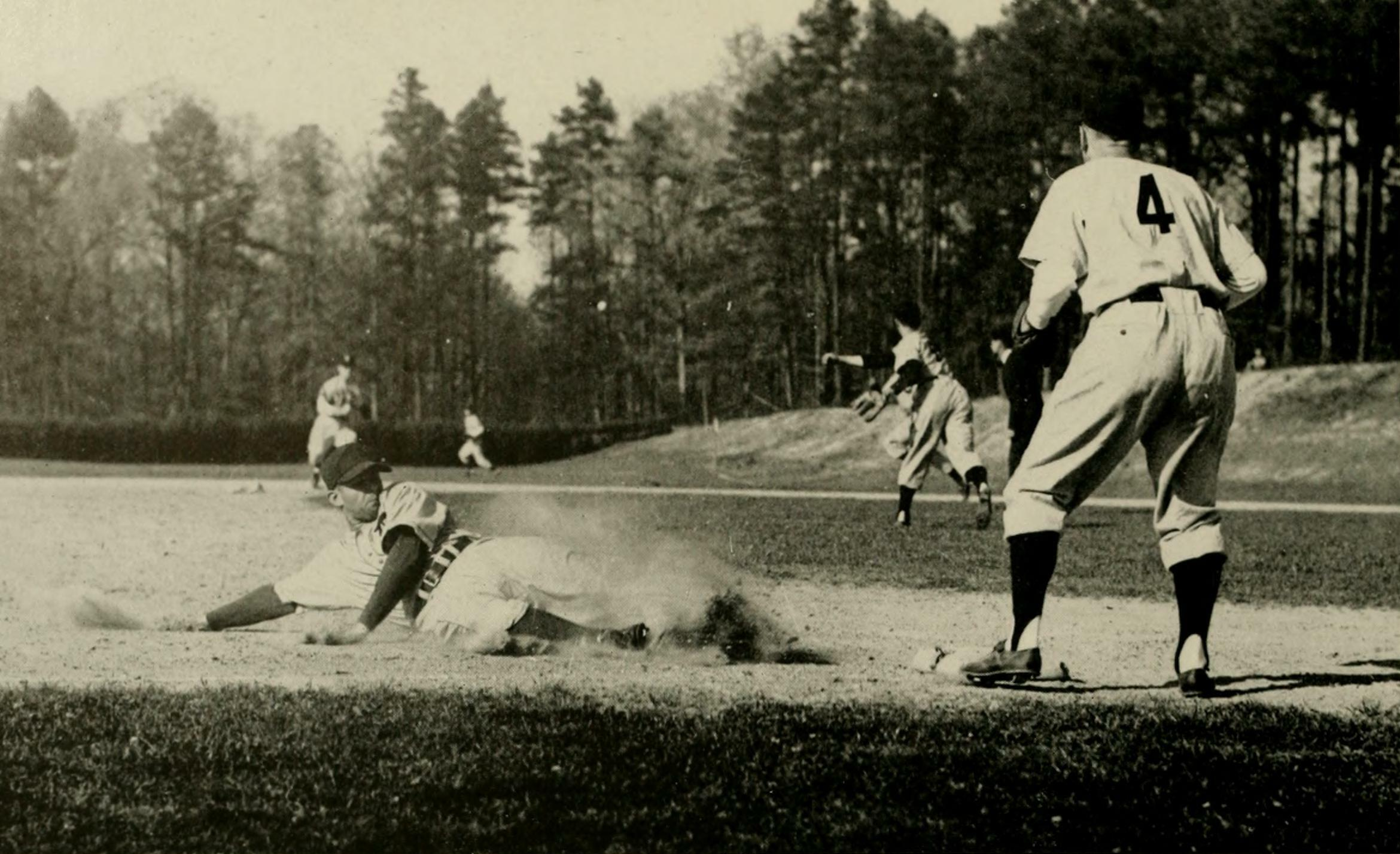
Groat sliding into third base for Duke (1952)

In baseball, Groat played shortstop at Duke. In his senior year (1952), he helped to lead the teams to a 31–7 record and their first College World Series. For the season, Groat hit .370 and led the team in doubles, hits, runs batted in, and stolen bases. He was a two-time winner of the McKelvin Award, given to the Athlete of the Year in the Southern Conference.

After Groat completed his junior year of college, Pittsburgh Pirates' general manager Branch Rickey offered him a chance to play professional baseball while allowing him to complete his degree in the off-season. Groat declined out of deference to Duke and its scholarship commitment. At the same time, Groat assured Rickey that, if the same contract was offered a year later, he would accept it. The St. Louis Cardinals and New York Giants also expressed interest in Groat, but Pittsburgh had the home-field advantage. He had always hoped to play near his hometown of Swissvale, a mere six miles from the Pirates' home stadium, Forbes Field. When Rickey repeated his offer in 1952 as expected, Groat signed his first professional contract in June, believed to be worth $35,000 to $40,000, which included a lucrative $25,000 bonus. Groat's contract was signed during a period that baseball's bonus rule was not in force, thus the Pirates were not obligated to keep him on their major-league roster, as was the case with other "bonus babies" of the era.

== Professional athletic career ==
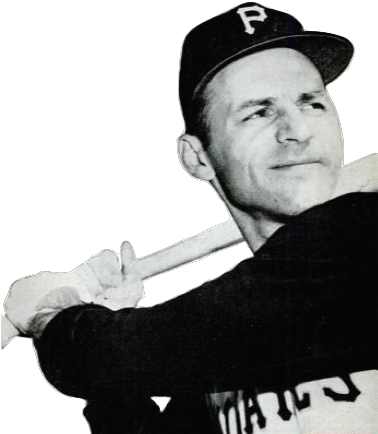
Groat in 1960 photo

Groat, then 21 years old, joined the Pirates on June 17 in New York, without a day of minor league experience. He made his major league debut the following day and subsequently batted a team-high .284 for the remainder of the season, recording 109 hits and 29 runs batted in.

After his MLB debut, Groat embarked on his second career, playing basketball for the Ft. Wayne Zollner Pistons of the National Basketball Association (NBA). Four months into the season, he enlisted in the US Army. He chose that time so his release would coincide with the start of baseball training camp two years later. During his military stint, he led Fort Belvoir teams to worldwide Army championships in baseball and basketball, the first time a single base had achieved the feat in the same year. He hit .362 on the diamond and averaged 35 points per game on the court.

When Groat returned to the Pirates in 1955, he led the last-place team in hits (139) and the NL in putouts at shortstop. One year later, he set a dubious MLB record – most at-bats (520) without a home run or stolen base in one season. In an attempt to improve their tenuous relationship, manager Bobby Bragan named him team captain midway through the season. Groat hit a .273 overall, but after his average tailed off in the final two months, he spent more time on his mechanics in the off-season.

Joe Brown was the Pirates' general manager in the final seven seasons that Groat spent with the team. In a 1961 Sport magazine story, Brown described his value like this: "(Groat) sets an example for the rest of the team. If he goes 5-for-5 and the team loses, he's unhappy. If he goes zero-for-5 and the team wins, he's happy. He's a constant reminder to the other players that a fellow can make himself a star without having all the tools."

At the outset of the 1957 season, Groat hit .319 in April and .370 in May, which put him in early contention for the NL batting title. He finished with a .315 average (fifth in the league) and a career-high seven home runs. On September 29, he threw out the final Giants batter in the last game they played at the Polo Grounds before moving to San Francisco in 1958.

In 1958, Groat hit .300 and led the NL in putouts and double plays, as the Pirates surprised the baseball world with a second-place finish. It marked the first time that they had placed higher than seventh in nine years.

While the Pirates failed to build on the momentum in 1959, Groat was selected to an All-Star team for the first time in his career. He hit .275 and paced the NL in putouts and double plays once again. The team finished last in home runs in the league, which convinced Brown to pursue a power hitter in the offseason. One potential trade would have sent Groat to the Kansas City Athletics in exchange for Roger Maris, a highly regarded 24-year-old outfielder. Manager Danny Murtaugh opposed the move.

In 1960, as the team captain, Groat became the first Pirate to be selected Most Valuable Player since Paul Waner in 1927. He hit .325 to become the first right-handed Pirates hitter to win the batting title since Honus Wagner in 1911. He sat out 20 days after his right wrist was fractured by a Lew Burdette pitch on September 6. Originally, Groat was expected to be sidelined for at least one month but he lobbied hard for an early return in order to be better prepared for the expected trip to the World Series.

Groat was considered one of the most difficult hitters to defend against in his era and a master of the hit-and-run play, a skill he developed under Pirates batting coach George Sisler, a two time .400 hitting Hall of Famer. Groat had good knowledge of the strike zone, walking more times than he struck out in six of his 13 full seasons.

=== 1960 World Series ===
While Groat hit a mere .214 against the Yankees in the 1960 World Series, partly because of his fractured wrist, he made contributions in three of the four victories. In the series opener, Groat tied the score on a double in the first inning. He came around on a Bob Skinner base hit to give the underdog Pirates an early 2–1 advantage. The lead held up, 6–4, as Groat and Mazeroski teamed up on a double play for the final outs.

In the fifth game, with his team ahead, 3–1, Groat doubled to lead off the third inning. Roberto Clemente followed with an RBI single for what proved to be the decisive run. The Pirates went on to a 5–3 triumph that gave them a 3–2 lead in the series.

In Game 7, the Pirates trailed 7–4 in the seventh inning. Groat delivered an RBI single to ignite a five-run rally that staked his team to a 9–7 advantage. The Pirates went on to win 10–9 on Mazeroski's walk-off home run in the ninth inning.

=== Trade to the Cardinals ===
1963 action shot of Groat for St. Louis Cardinals

In 1961, Groat batted .275, and teamed with Mazeroski to lead the league in double plays. One season later, he improved to a .294 batting average and finished third in the league in doubles (34). He also led the NL in putouts, assists, and double plays.

While the 1962 Pirates bounced back with a 93-win season, Brown had grown concerned about a pitching staff that relied heavily on veterans whose best days were behind them. The 32-year-old Groat had an inkling that he would be traded while he still had value, and his fears were realized in November, when he was dealt to the St. Louis Cardinals in exchange for pitcher Don Cardwell, a 15-game winner the previous season. Groat was deeply hurt by the trade, having hoped to become a Pirates coach and possibly manager after his retirement as a player. He subsequently severed ties with the organization until a 1990 reunion of the 1960 World Series team.

Fully intent to prove that Brown had made an egregious mistake, Groat responded with a vengeance in the 1963 campaign. In his best season in the big leagues, he set career marks in RBI (73), hits (201), doubles (43), triples (11), on-base percentage (.377), and slugging percentage (.450) to finish second to Los Angeles Dodgers pitcher Sandy Koufax in the NL Most Valuable Player vote. His .319 batting average ranked fourth in the league, seven points behind the leader Tommy Davis (Dodgers).

While Groat produced a career-high 73 RBI in his Cardinals debut, manager Johnny Keane became convinced that he could be even more valuable as a run-producer. The veteran batted either third, fifth or sixth in the order on a regular basis in the 1964 season, when he drove in 70 runs. He hit .292, played consistent defense, and continued to mentor younger teammates in a leadership role, as the Cardinals captured their first NL pennant in 18 years. He earned the final All-Star selection of his career and led the league in assists and double plays once again.

=== 1964 World Series ===
In the fourth game of the World Series, Groat was involved in one of the turning points in the series. The Cardinals trailed 3–0 in the sixth inning and were on the verge of a 3–1 deficit in the series. With two runners on base, he hit a ground ball to second baseman Bobby Richardson, who fumbled a relay toss near the bag to load the bases. Ken Boyer followed with a grand slam home run that held up for a 4–3 victory. Three innings earlier, Groat tagged out Mickey Mantle on a pickoff play that thwarted a two-on, two-out threat.

Groat reached base on a fielder's choice groundout and scored on Tim McCarver's three-run homer in the 10th inning of Game 5, which saw the Cardinals score a 5–2 victory. He had an RBI groundout in the 7–5 win in the Game 7 clincher.

=== Final years ===
In 1965, after 10 consecutive seasons as an everyday player, the 34-year-old Groat experienced the worst season of his career in several categories. He hit .254 and drove home 52 runs in 153 games. Afterward, as part of a six-player transaction, he was traded with catcher Bob Uecker and first baseman Bill White to the Philadelphia Phillies, whose manager Gene Mauch had long been impressed by his skills and leadership. Groat hit .265 in his only full season with the team, after which his contract was sold to the San Francisco Giants in June of the following year. He spent the final months of the 1967 season mostly as a late-inning defensive replacement and pinch-hitter before he announced his retirement.

In his career, Groat totaled 829 runs scored, 707 runs batted in, 352 doubles, 67 triples and 39 home runs in 1,929 games. He helped turn 1,237 double plays at shortstop, the 14th most at the position in MLB history.

== NBA career ==
Less than two months after Groat played his final game of the 1952 baseball season, he made his NBA debut on November 9 with the Fort Wayne Pistons. Even though the guard could not practice with the team because of his student responsibilities – he commuted from Duke to play in three exhibition games – the transition was a relatively seamless one. He scored 11 points in a 74–71 victory over the rival Indianapolis Olympians, the first for the Pistons after an 0–3 start.

Groat quickly became a fan favorite in Fort Wayne, whose partisans took a liking to his pull-up jump shot, leaping ability, and boundless energy. In only his second game, the rookie scored a career-high 25 points in a 112–83 rout of the New York Knicks, who had advanced to the NBA Finals the previous season.

Groat saw his first season come to a halt in February, when he enlisted in the U.S. Army rather than delay the inevitable. He left the vastly improved Pistons in much better position than when he arrived – they had a 24–24 record at the time of his departure en route to a postseason berth. When Groat was discharged in 1954, Branch Rickey was adamant that his prized shortstop would play only baseball because of the potential health risks that a dual career could pose for him. "Mr. Rickey said, 'You have played your last game in the NBA,'" Groat recalled the conversation. "I would never have given up basketball, but I would have lost the rest of the my bonus. He played hardball."

In what would be his only season of pro basketball, Groat ranked second on the Pistons in points (11.9) and third assists (2.7) per game.

== Recognition and achievements ==
Groat achieved numerous accomplishments during his career. He was selected as an NL All-Star eight times between 1959 and 1964, playing in two games in 1959, 1960, and 1962. He was also the NL singles leader twice, in 1954 and 1960. In 1963, Groat was the runner-up for the NL Most Valuable Player award. He was one of only two regular players to have beaten the New York Yankees in Game 7 of the World Series more than once in their careers, the other being Don Hoak, who accomplished this feat with the 1955 Brooklyn Dodgers and 1960 Pirates.

Groat was one of only 13 athletes to have played in both the National Basketball Association and Major League Baseball. He appeared on the cover of Sports Illustrated three times in his career, in 1960, 1963, and 1966.

=== Pirates Hall of Fame ===
In August 2022, the Pirates organization elected its inaugural Hall of Fame class. Former teammates Clemente and Mazeroski were among the 19 selections chosen by an unnamed panel but Groat was not. He was elected the next year, and informed of his selection on April 18, 2023, nine days before his death.

== Post-playing career and interests ==
From the 1979–80 through the 2018–19 seasons, Groat spent 40 seasons as the radio color analyst for Pittsburgh Panthers men's basketball games. In that period, he and play-by-play partner Bill Hillgrove were the longest tenured broadcast team in the college game. His road schedule was limited to games at Duke in his final two seasons, after which his contract was not renewed.

=== Golf ===
Groat became more active in golf after his baseball career. While he stopped playing the sport in 2014 because of physical limitations, he routinely shot in the 70s in his prime. In 1964, he and Pirates teammate Jerry Lynch designed and built Champion Lakes Golf Course in Ligonier, Pennsylvania, one of only three public courses to receive a four-star rating in Western Pennsylvania. As course owner and manager, he lived on the grounds and was a familiar face there.

== Personal life ==
In November 1955, Groat married Barbara Womble, a former model who worked in New York City. The couple had three daughters: Tracey, Carol Ann, and Allison. They were married for 35 years until Barbara died from lung cancer in 1990.

Groat was the great-uncle of golfer Brooks Koepka, who won the 2017 and 2018 U.S. Open, and the 2018, 2019 and 2023 PGA Championship.

Groat was a resident of the Pittsburgh suburb of Edgewood. On April 27, 2023, he died at UPMC Presbyterian in Pittsburgh at the age of 92, from complications of a stroke he had a week before.

== Career statistics ==
=== MLB ===
Category	G	BA	AB	R	H	2B	3B	HR	RBI	SB	CS	BB	SO	OBP	SLG	OPS	E	FLD%
Total	1,929	.286	7,484	829	2,138	352	67	39	707	17	27	490	512	.330	.366	.696	376	.961

=== NBA ===
Legend
GP	Games played	GS	Games started	MPG	Minutes per game
FG%	Field goal percentage	3P%	3-point field goal percentage	FT%	Free throw percentage
RPG	Rebounds per game	APG	Assists per game	SPG	Steals per game
BPG	Blocks per game	PPG	Points per game	**Bold**	Career high

==== Regular season ====
Year	Team	GP	MPG	FG%	FT%	RPG	APG	PPG
1952–53	Fort Wayne	26	25.5	.368	.790	3.3	2.7	11.9

== See also ==
- List of Major League Baseball career hits leaders
- List of Major League Baseball batting champions
- List of Major League Baseball annual doubles leaders
- List of Major League Baseball single-game hits leaders
- List of baseball players who went directly to Major League Baseball
