= Bob Skinner =

American baseball player and manager (1931–2026)

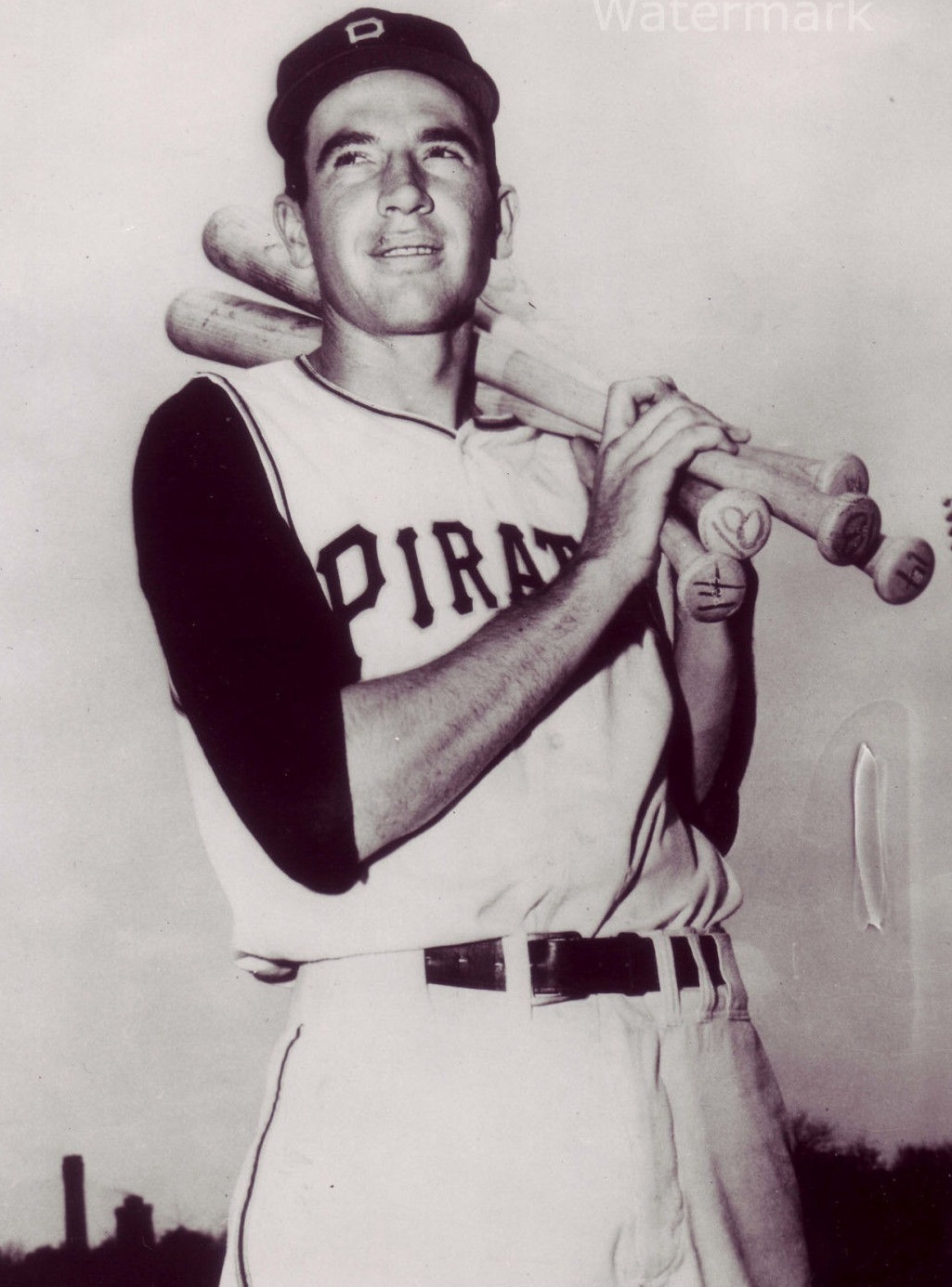
- Left fielder / Manager
- Born: October 3, 1931; La Jolla, California, U.S.
- Died: May 4, 2026 (aged 94); San Diego, California, U.S.
- Batted: Left Threw: Right

MLB debut
- April 13, 1954, for the Pittsburgh Pirates

Last MLB appearance
- September 24, 1966, for the St. Louis Cardinals

MLB statistics
- Batting average: .277
- Home runs: 103
- Runs batted in: 531
- Managerial record: 93–123
- Winning %: .431
- Stats at Baseball Reference
- Managerial record at Baseball Reference

Teams
- As player: Pittsburgh Pirates (1954, 1956–1963); Cincinnati Reds (1963–1964); St. Louis Cardinals (1964–1966); As manager: Philadelphia Phillies (1968–1969); San Diego Padres (1977); As coach: San Diego Padres (1970–1973); Pittsburgh Pirates (1974–1976); San Diego Padres (1977); California Angels (1978); Pittsburgh Pirates (1979–1985); Atlanta Braves (1986–1988)

Career highlights and awards
- 3× All-Star (1958, 1960, 1960²); 3× World Series champion (1960, 1964, 1979)

Robert Ralph Skinner (October 3, 1931 – May 4, 2026) was an American professional baseball left fielder, first baseman, manager, coach and scout. He played 12 seasons in Major League Baseball (MLB) for the Pittsburgh Pirates, Cincinnati Reds, and St. Louis Cardinals from 1954 to 1966, and managed for the Philadelphia Phillies and San Diego Padres. In all, Skinner spent over 50 years in the game. He won three World Series and was an All-Star in two seasons for the Pirates.

== Early life ==
Skinner was born in San Diego, California, on October 3, 1931. He played baseball for La Jolla High School, batting .302 as a senior and making the All-League team. Pittsburgh Pirates scout Tom Downey saw potential in Skinner’s swing and got Skinner into semi-professional Sunday league baseball so he could further develop. Skinner's father, a Spanish and French language teacher, wanted his son to go to college so Skinner attended San Diego Junior College, where he hit .411 on the school's baseball team. He left college after one year, and was signed by Downey to a contract with the Pittsburgh.

== Professional career ==
=== Pittsburgh Pirates ===
In 1951, Skinner played 98 games for the Class B Waco Pirates, with a .283 batting average, nine home runs, 58 runs batted in (RBI) and 67 runs. He then played 29 games for the Class D Mayfield Clothiers, where he had a .472 batting average, six home runs, 50 hits, 40 runs scored, 29 RBIs and a 1.378 OPS (on-base plus slugging).

Skinner's minor-league career was interrupted by service in the United States Marine Corps from 1951 to 1953. He did play organized baseball while serving in the Marines, hitting .402 and .379. Skinner was a corporal at the time of his separation and had earned the National Defense Service Medal. He was married the following February, just one week before starting training camp with the 1954 Pirates.

Skinner made the Pirates coming out of spring training in 1954, making his big league debut on April 13 as a first baseman. He batted .249 in 132 games a rookie, with 8 home runs and 46 RBI.

Skinner headed back to the minors in 1955, playing for Pirates' Double-A affiliate New Orleans Pelicans, and batting .346 (the second highest batting average in the Southern Association among players with over 300 at bats.) with 8 home runs, 62 RBIs, 62 runs and a .976 OPS. Skinner's season ended after he broke his wrist on July 3.

Skinner returned to the Pirates in 1956 as a backup outfielder and first baseman, starting 30 games in the outfield and 19 at first base. He hit only .202 in 233 at bats. Skinner was used often as a pinch hitter in 1956, and tied a 43-year old team record with three pinch hit home runs that season.

The Pirates moved Skinner to the outfield in 1957, where he started 83 games in left field while starting eight at first base. On the season, he hit .305, raising his average over .100 points from the previous season, and was considered by many, including Pirates' manager Danny Murtaugh, the most improved player in the National League. Skinner had 13 home runs and led the Pirates with 10 stolen bases; one of only five players in the National League to have double figures in home runs and stolen bases. Murtaugh also believed Skinner improved defensively as an outfielder because of his exceptional speed and regular opportunity to play and gain more experience.

Skinner's breakout season came in 1958. Starting 141 games as the Pirates left fielder, he hit a career-high .321, with 13 home runs, 70 RBIs, 93 runs, 12 stolen bases and an .879 OPS. Skinner was selected to the National League All-Star Team for the first time, as the starting left fielder. He went 1-for-3 and had one RBI in the game, played in Baltimore's Memorial Stadium. He hit second in the NL's batting order, after leadoff hitter Wille Mays and before Stan Musial. Skinner was 15th in NL Most Valuable Player voting. He was fifth among all NL players in batting average and on-base percentage (.387), sixth in offensive WAR (wins above replacement, 4.7) and doubles (33), seventh in OPS, triples (9) and runs, eighth in hits (170) and tenth in total bases (260). The Pirates finished the season 84–70. In Skinner's three prior seasons with the Pirates, they had never won more than 66 games.

In mid-April 1959, Skinner was injured trying to catch a Hank Aaron line drive, and it took him a few weeks to recover. Despite the slow beginning to the season, Skinner again started 141 games in left field, and hit .280, with 13 home runs, 61 RBIs and 78 runs. The Pirates finished the season 78–76, in fourth place.

In 1960, the Pirates won the World Series in seven games over the New York Yankees, and Skinner became an All-Star for the second season in his career. He started 140 games in left field, and hit .273 with 15 home runs, 83 RBIs, 83 runs and 11 stolen bases. Skinner started the July 11 All-Star Game in left field, batting second between Mays and future Hall of Fame third baseman Eddie Mathews. He was 1-for-4 with a run, RBI and a stolen base. He also started the July 13 All-Star Game, again batting second; this time between Mays and Aaron. He was 1-for-3 in the game.

Skinner was 1-for-3 in Game 1 of the 1960 World Series, batting third in the lineup. He had a single, RBI, stolen base, and run scored in the first inning of the Pirates 6–4 victory. In the second inning he caught a short fly ball and threw to second base for a double play against Yogi Berra. He was also hit by a Ryne Duren pitch in the game. Skinner jammed his thumb during the game sliding into third base, however, and did not play again until Game 7; being replaced in left field by Gino Cimoli for Games 2 through 6. He was 0-for-2 in the legendary Game 7, with a base on balls, run scored, and a key sacrifice bunt in the eighth inning, in the Pirates 10–9 series winning victory, memorably won on Bill Mazeroski’s walk-off home run.

In 1961, Skinner experienced a variety of maladies and injuries. He started only 96 games in left field, appearing in only 119 total games. He hit .268, with three home runs and 42 RBIs in only 381 at bats; his lowest production in all of these categories since 1956. Skinner put himself through a rigorous training and conditioning program after the season ended and through the winter, even giving up his off season job with a San Diego newspaper to focus on his training regime. He came into the 1962 season in the best shape of his career at 30-years old.

In 1962, Skinner played in 144 games, with nearly 600 plate appearances. He had a .302 batting average, and career-highs in home runs (20), on-base percentage (.395) and slugging percentage (.504). Skinner also had 75 RBIs, 87 runs and 10 stolen bases. The Pirates went from sixth place in 1961 (75–79) to fourth place in 1962 (93–68). He was third in the NL in on-base percentage, eighth in offensive WAR (4.7) and OPS (.899), and ninth in doubles (29). Skinner finished 22nd in NL Most Valuable Player voting.

On May 23, 1963, the Pirates traded Skinner to the Cincinnati Reds for 33-year-old Jerry Lynch. Skinner and Lynch had started as rookies together on the 1954 Pirates. Skinner had started 30 games for the Pirates at the time of the trade, and was hitting .270 in 122 at bats, with five doubles and five triples, but no home runs.

=== Cincinnati Reds and St. Louis Cardinals ===
Skinner started 46 of the 72 games he played for the Reds in 1963, hitting .253 in 194 at bats, with three home runs, 17 RBIs and 25 runs. Skinner's production, however, did not live up to Reds' manager Fred Hutchison's expectations. The following season, on June 13, 1964, after appearing in only 25 games for the Reds (with only 12 starts), Skinner was traded to the St. Louis Cardinals for 25-year old minor league catcher Jim Saul and cash.

Skinner started 29 of the 55 games in which he appeared for the Cardinals in 1964, batting .271 in 118 at bats, with one home run, 16 RBIs and 10 runs. The Cardinals defeated the New York Yankees in the 1964 World Series, with Skinner appearing as a pinch hitter four times during the series (Games 1, 2, 3 and 6). He had two hits in three at bats (including a ground rule double), with one base on balls and one RBI.

He played two more seasons for the Cardinals before being released in October 1966, ending his MLB career. Starting 28 games in 1965, he hit .309 with five home runs, 26 RBIs, 25 runs and an .853 OPS. In 1966, he was used solely as a pinch hitter, batting .156 in 45 at bats.

Over his 12-year career, he batted .277 with 1,198 hits, including 197 doubles, 58 triples and 103 homers.

== Managing and coaching career ==
In 1967, Skinner retired from playing and became manager of his hometown team, the San Diego Padres of the Triple-A Pacific Coast League (PCL), the top farm club of the Philadelphia Phillies. He led San Diego to an 85–63 record and the 1967 PCL championship. The 36-year old Skinner won Minor League Manager of the Year honors from The Sporting News.

In 1968, he began the year at San Diego but on June 16 he was called to the Phillies to replace manager Gene Mauch, with the team in fifth place with a record of 27–27. It was reported at the time that Mauch was fired in connection with his strained relationship to future Hall-of-Famer Dick Allen. Allen hit extremely well during the Phillies first 30 games under Skinner, and the team went 17–13, including a seven-game winning streak. As of July 15, the Phillies were 45–40 and in third place. The managing change ultimately did not improve the Phillies' play, however, and under Skinner, the team had a 48–59 record, finishing the season tied for seventh place in the NL.

The Phillies began the 1969 season 26–37 and were in fifth place in the new NL East Division when the relationship between Skinner, the Phillies, and Allen entered a phase of irreparable deterioration on June 24, with Allen subsequently missing weeks of play. The team's record fell to 44–64, and they were still in fifth place in the NL East Division, when Skinner resigned and was replaced by his third-base coach, George Myatt, on August 6. Myatt went on to a 19–35 record as interim manager that season. It was reported at the time that Skinner resigned because he believed he had a lack of support from the Phillies ownership and front office, particularly in his own difficult relationship with Dick Allen. Skinner said he liked the job and thought he was doing well as a manager, but his pride would not allow him to stay under circumstances where he believed the team did not stand behind his decisions as manager, and that the team's attitude and approach would prevent the Phillies from becoming a winning team. Phillies owner Bob Carpenter said that he regretted Skinner's decision to resign. Carpenter disagreed with Skinner on the lack of support question, but agreed that if Skinner did not agree with his bosses' decision-making then it was right to resign.

In early September 1969, the expansion National League San Diego Padres announced Skinner would join the team as a coach, under manager Preston Gomez, in 1970. He served as third base coach and a hitting instructor with the Padres in 1970, working with young slugger Nate Colbert, among others. His dual role continued in 1971, but then he was made solely a batting coach in 1972 and 1973. Skinner became the Pirates batting coach from 1974 to 1976.

He was with the Padres again as a batting coach in 1977, and served one game as interim manager after John McNamara was fired, before Alvin Dark took over as manager to finish the season. Former Padres general manager Buzzy Bavasi hired Skinner to join the California Angels coaching staff in 1978, a move that made Padres owner Ray Kroc unhappy. In 1979, he became the Pirates batting coach again, winning his third World Series ring. Skinner continued in that position until 1985. He coached third base for the Pirates in 1985. Skinner became the Atlanta Braves hitting coach in 1986 and continued coaching for Atlanta in 1987. In 1988, he was the Braves first base coach, and worked with the team's outfielders, until he was fired on May 22, along with the rest of the coaching staff.

In November 1988, the Houston Astros named Skinner to manage their Triple-A affiliate, the Tucson Toros of the Pacific Coast League. He managed the Toros from 1989 to 1992, with a 361–355 record. After the 1992 season, the Astros assigned Skinner to an advanced scouting position, and he continued as a scout for Houston in the ensuing years.

His career record as a Major League manager, including a one-game interim stint with the 1977 Padres, was 93–123 (.431).

== Media career ==
Skinner worked as a sports commentator for a San Diego television station during his managing and coaching career.

== Personal life and death ==
During the off season as a player he worked as an x-ray technician in a jet engine plant in San Diego; and also worked in promotions for a San Diego newspaper. Skinner was the father of former MLB catcher and coach, and minor league manager, Joel Skinner.

Skinner died in San Diego on May 4, 2026, at the age of 94.

== Honors ==
In 1976, Skinner was also inducted by the San Diego Hall of Champions into the Breitbard Hall of Fame honoring San Diego's finest athletes both on and off the playing surface.

== Career statistics ==
Years	Games	PA	AB	R	H	2B	3B	HR	RBI	SB	BB	SO	AVG	OBP	SLG	FLD%
12	1381	4873	4318	642	1198	197	58	103	531	67	485	646	.277	.351	.421	.977

Skinner played 893 games at left field, 151 games at first base, 56 games at right field and 2 games at third base.
