= Bill Virdon =

American baseball player and manager (1931–2021)

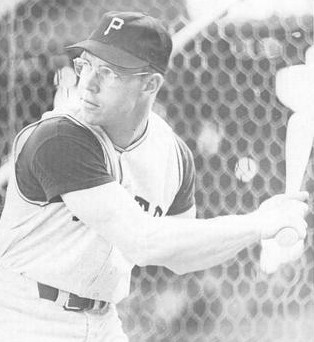
- Virdon with the Pirates in 1965
- Center fielder / Manager
- Born: June 9, 1931; Hazel Park, Michigan, U.S.
- Died: November 23, 2021 (aged 90); Springfield, Missouri, U.S.
- Batted: Left Threw: Right

MLB debut
- April 12, 1955, for the St. Louis Cardinals

Last MLB appearance
- July 26, 1968, for the Pittsburgh Pirates

MLB statistics
- Batting average: .267
- Home runs: 91
- Runs batted in: 502
- Managerial record: 995–921
- Winning %: .519
- Stats at Baseball Reference
- Managerial record at Baseball Reference

Teams
- As player: St. Louis Cardinals (1955–1956); Pittsburgh Pirates (1956–1965, 1968); As manager: Pittsburgh Pirates (1972–1973); New York Yankees (1974–1975); Houston Astros (1975–1982); Montreal Expos (1983–1984)

Career highlights and awards
- 2× World Series champion (1960, 1971); NL Rookie of the Year (1955); Gold Glove Award (1962)

William Charles Virdon (June 9, 1931 – November 23, 2021) was an American professional baseball outfielder, manager, and coach in Major League Baseball (MLB). Virdon played in MLB for the St. Louis Cardinals and Pittsburgh Pirates from 1955 through 1965 and in 1968. He served as a coach for the Pirates and Houston Astros, and managed the Pirates, Astros, New York Yankees, and Montreal Expos.

After playing in the minors for the Yankees organization, Virdon was traded to the Cardinals, and he made his MLB debut in 1955. That year, Virdon won the National League Rookie of the Year Award. He slumped at the beginning of the 1956 season, and was traded to the Pirates, where he spent the remainder of his playing career. A premier defensive outfielder during his playing days as a center fielder for the Cardinals and Pirates, Virdon led a strong defensive team to the 1960 World Series championship. In 1962, Virdon won a Gold Glove Award. Following the 1965 season, he retired due to his desire to become a manager.

Virdon managed in the minor leagues until returning to the Pirates as a coach in 1968. He served as manager of the Pirates in 1972 and 1973, before becoming the manager of the Yankees in 1974. During the 1975 season, the Yankees fired Virdon, and he was hired by the Astros. After being fired by the Astros after the 1982 season, Virdon managed the Expos in 1983 and 1984. Virdon won The Sporting News' Manager of the Year Award in 1974, his only full season working for the Yankees, and in 1980, while managing the Astros. He returned to the Pirates as a coach following his managerial career, and remained with the Pirates as a guest instructor during spring training.

== Early life ==
William Charles Virdon was born in Hazel Park, Michigan, on June 9, 1931. His parents, Bertha and Charles Virdon, were originally from Missouri, but moved to Hazel Park during the Great Depression, where they were able to find jobs in automotive factories. When he was 12 years old, his family moved to West Plains, Missouri.

Virdon attended West Plains High School. He competed in American football, basketball, and track and field for the school. As West Plains did not compete in baseball, Virdon traveled to Clay Center, Kansas, to play for their American Amateur Baseball Congress team as a center fielder and shortstop. He enrolled at Drury University in Springfield, Missouri.

== Playing career ==
=== Minor league career ===
Virdon attended an open tryout held by the New York Yankees in Branson, Missouri, and scout Tom Greenwade signed Virdon to the Yankees for a $1,800 signing bonus ($24,087 in current dollar terms). Virdon made his professional debut in 1950 with the Independence Yankees in the Class D Kansas–Oklahoma–Missouri League, and was promoted to the Kansas City Blues in the Class AAA American Association for the final 14 games of the season. Virdon played for the Norfolk Tars in the Class B Piedmont League in 1951, and for the Binghamton Triplets in the Class A Eastern League in 1952. The Yankees assigned him to Kansas City in 1953, but he struggled, batting .233. While he played in Kansas City, Virdon was diagnosed with astigmatism. When Kansas City manager Harry Craft noticed Virdon reading while wearing glasses, Craft told him to wear them while he played.

The Yankees demoted Virdon to the Birmingham Barons in the Class AA Southern Association. In 42 games for Birmingham, Virdon had a .317 batting average. According to Hal Smith, his roommate with Birmingham, Virdon changed his approach to hitting, prioritizing line drives to all parts of the field, rather than trying to hit for power.

Virdon remained stuck behind Mickey Mantle on the Yankees' depth chart for center field, while Gene Woodling and Hank Bauer played the corner outfield positions. The Yankees traded Virdon to the St. Louis Cardinals before the 1954 season with Mel Wright and Emil Tellinger for veteran outfielder and All-Star Enos Slaughter. Virdon struggled during spring training, and Cardinals manager Eddie Stanky worked with Virdon to improve his hitting. The Cardinals assigned Virdon to the Rochester Red Wings of the Class AAA International League for the season. He led the league with a .333 batting average and hit 22 home runs, finishing second in voting for the International League Most Valuable Player Award to catcher Elston Howard with the Toronto Maple Leafs Baseball Club.

=== Major league career ===
Virdon joined the Cardinals in 1955, as the Cardinals moved Stan Musial to first base to allow Virdon to play the outfield. As a rookie, Virdon had a .281 average with 17 home runs and 69 runs batted in (RBIs). He was named the winner of the National League (NL) Rookie of the Year Award, voted on by the Baseball Writers' Association of America, beating Jack Meyer of the Philadelphia Phillies.

After the 1955 season, the Cardinals hired Frank Lane, nicknamed "The Trader", as their general manager. Virdon slumped to begin the 1956 season, and the Cardinals traded him to the Pittsburgh Pirates in May 1956 for Bobby Del Greco and Dick Littlefield. Lane claimed that Virdon's late season slump in 1955 was because he tired down the stretch, and that is why he chose to trade him. Lane later referred to the trade as "the worst trade [he] ever made".

When he arrived at Pittsburgh, he developed an eye condition, for which he received treatment, missing one week of the season. Virdon's vision improved, and he challenged Hank Aaron for the NL batting title. Virdon batted .334 for the Pirates during remainder of the season, which increased his season batting average to .319, second-best in the NL to Aaron, who batted .328. Pirates' announcer Bob Prince gave Virdon the nickname "Quail" due to the frequency of his soft-hit infield hits.

The Pirates hired Danny Murtaugh as their manager during the 1957 season; Virdon credited Murtaugh with pushing him to perform at his best. Virdon consistently batted in the .260s for the next several seasons. He led all NL center fielders in assists in 1959 with 16, and in double plays turned with five. In 1960, Virdon, along with right fielder Roberto Clemente, shortstop Dick Groat, second baseman Bill Mazeroski, and third baseman Don Hoak, formed a strong defensive unit for the Pirates, and they reached the 1960 World Series, where they faced the New York Yankees. Virdon batted .241 during the seven-game series. In the deciding Game 7, he hit a ground ball that struck Yankees shortstop Tony Kubek in the throat after taking an unpredictable bounce, enabling Virdon to reach base safely. This started a rally for the Pirates that culminated in Bill Mazeroski's home run that won the series for Pittsburgh.

Virdon led the NL in triples with 10 during the 1962 season. That year, he won the Rawlings Gold Glove Award. He struggled in the 1964 season, batting only .243. Though his batting average improved to .279 in the 1965 season, Virdon retired after the season due to his desire to become a manager. Virdon retired with 1,596 MLB hits and a career batting average of .267 with 91 home runs during his 1,583-game NL career.

Virdon hit an impressive .404 (21-for-52) against Sandy Koufax, the highest average of any batter facing the legendary Hall of Fame pitcher.

== Coaching and managing career ==
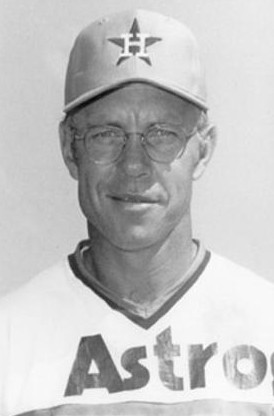
Virdon in 1976

Virdon began operating a baseball academy in 1956. After the 1962 season, Virdon coached in the Arizona Instructional League. He coached in the Florida Instructional League following the 1964 season. Following his retirement as a player after the 1965 season, Virdon spent the next two seasons as a manager in the minor leagues for the New York Mets' organization. In 1966, he managed the Williamsport Mets of the Eastern League, and in 1967, he managed the Jacksonville Suns of the International League. He led Williamsport to a 68–72 win–loss record, and Jacksonville to a 66–73 record.

Virdon joined the Pirates' major league coaching staff under manager Larry Shepard in 1968. He also appeared in six games as a player because a number of Pirates players had entered military service. Shepard left the Pirates after the 1969 season, and Virdon interviewed to become the Pirates' next manager. However, the Pirates re-hired Murtaugh, and Virdon remained on Murtaugh's coaching staff. Virdon coached for the Pirates as they won the 1971 World Series. Due to health problems, Murtaugh retired after the 1971 season, and Virdon was named as his successor.

As a manager, Virdon led the Pirates to the 1972 NL East division title, but the Pirates lost the 1972 National League Championship Series (NLCS) to the Cincinnati Reds when Pittsburgh pitcher Bob Moose unleashed a wild pitch in the final inning of Game 5, allowing the winning run to score. The 1973 Pirates now played without Clemente, who died during the previous offseason. Further struggles included pitcher Steve Blass' inability to throw strikes and injuries to Dock Ellis. Virdon clashed with Ellis and Richie Hebner. The Pirates were in third place with a 67–69 record when the team fired Virdon and replaced him with Murtaugh.

The Yankees announced the hiring of Dick Williams as their manager for the 1974 season, but American League president Joe Cronin nullified the transaction because Williams was still under contract with the Oakland Athletics. The Athletics demanded prospects Otto Vélez and Scott McGregor as compensation for Williams, but the Yankees decided the price was too steep. Without a manager, the Yankees hired Virdon, signing him to a one-year contract. Virdon led the Yankees to a competitive finish, one game behind the Baltimore Orioles in the American League East division. He won The Sporting News' Manager of the Year Award. The Yankees signed him to a two-year contract after the 1974 season, with a raise from $50,000 to $65,000 per year. However, Virdon clashed with Bobby Murcer. He received a death threat due to his preference of playing Elliott Maddox over Murcer in center field. The Yankees struggled in 1975. When Billy Martin was fired as manager of the Texas Rangers during the 1975 season, the Yankees fired Virdon on August 2 and hired Martin. With Yankee Stadium being renovated in the two years he was at the helm (the club played at Shea Stadium instead), Virdon became the only Yankees manager (post-1923) to never manage a game at the Yankees’ venerable ballpark.

The Houston Astros hired Virdon as their manager on August 20, 1975, succeeding Preston Gómez. Tal Smith, who had served as executive vice president for the Yankees, had become the Astros' general manager on August 7. Virdon led the Astros to third-place finishes in 1976 and 1977, but the Astros slipped to fifth place in 1978. The 1979 Astros fell one game short of winning the NL West division championship. The Astros tied the Los Angeles Dodgers for the division championship in 1980, and defeated them in the 1980 NL West tie-breaker game. While the team had success on the field, Virdon clashed with free agent (and future Hall of Famer) Joe Morgan, who bristled at Virdon's preference for taking Morgan out late for Rafael Landestoy; Morgan even made a comment to a reporter about not wanting to play 1981 with Virdon as manager, although management tried to walk back the report. The Astros played the Philadelphia Phillies in the 1980 NLCS that went the full five games that saw the final four end in extra innings while Houston blew an eighth inning lead in both Game 4 and Game 5, each held at home. He again won the Manager of the Year Award in 1980. Due to the 1981 Major League Baseball strike, the 1981 season was split into halves with each half's winner appearing in the 1981 NL Division Series. The Dodgers won the first half, while the Astros won the second. In the Division Series, the Astros won the first two games at home, each in extra innings. They then went to Los Angeles needing one more win. However, the Astros scored two runs combined in the next three games to lose the series. During the 1982 season, the Astros fell to fifth place with a disastrous 9-14 first month that had them go below .500 by the fifth game and never recover. Beset by injuries to relievers Joe Sambito and Dave Smith that each saw them miss significant time, the Astros lost over a dozen games in late innings. On August 11, Virdon was fired during the season and replaced by Bob Lillis.

The Montreal Expos hired Virdon as their manager before the 1983 season, replacing Jim Fanning, and signed him to a two-year contract. During the 1984 season, Virdon expressed to Expos general manager John McHale that he did not want to return to the Expos in 1985. With a 64–67 record in August 1984, the Expos fired Virdon, replacing him with Fanning. Gary Lucas, a pitcher for the Expos, felt that they had lost many one-run games because Virdon was too conservative in his managing, not employing the hit and run play and relying on the starting pitcher for too long into the game.

Virdon returned to the Pirates as the hitting coach under Jim Leyland in 1986, Leyland's first season as a manager. He took the position only when he was convinced that he would not succeed Leyland should the Pirates fire him. Following a contract dispute, the Pirates replaced Virdon with Milt May before the 1987 season. Virdon remained with the Pirates as a minor league hitting instructor from 1987 through 1989. He worked as a spring training instructor for the Cardinals in 1990 and 1991, and then rejoined Leyland's coaching staff in Pittsburgh in 1992.

With Major League Baseball expanding by two teams for the 1993 season, in 1992 Virdon interviewed for the managerial positions of both expansion teams, the Florida Marlins and the Colorado Rockies. The Marlins instead hired Rene Lachemann, and the Rockies hired Don Baylor. In 1994, Virdon interviewed with the Orioles for their vacant managerial position. Virdon left the Pirates after the 1995 season. He became the bench coach for the Astros under first-time manager Larry Dierker in 1997. The Pirates brought Virdon back as their bench coach for the 2001 season under first-time manager Lloyd McClendon. He retired from coaching after the 2002 season.

Virdon's career managerial record, over all or parts of 13 seasons, was 995–921 (.519). He also managed in the minor leagues for the Cardinals and the Astros. In June 2012, the Pirates attempted to add Virdon and Mazeroski to their coaching staff, but were rebuffed by MLB for violating the rules on uniformed coaching staffs after one game. Virdon continued to serve as a special outfield instructor for the Pirates during spring training.

== Managerial record ==
Team	Year	Regular season					Postseason			
Team	Year	Games	Won	Lost	Win %	Finish	Won	Lost	Win %	Result
PIT	1972	155	96	59	.619	1st in NL East	2	3	.400	Lost NLCS (CIN)
PIT	1973	136	67	69	.493	fired	–	–	–	–
PIT total		291	163	128	.560		2	3	.400	
NYY	1974	162	89	73	.549	2nd in AL East	–	–	–	–
NYY	1975	104	53	51	.510	fired	–	–	–	–
NYY total		266	142	124	.534		0	0	–	
HOU	1975	34	17	17	.500	6th in NL West	–	–	–	–
HOU	1976	162	80	82	.494	3rd in NL West	–	–	–	–
HOU	1977	162	81	81	.500	3rd in NL West	–	–	–	–
HOU	1978	162	74	88	.457	5th in NL West	–	–	–	–
HOU	1979	162	89	73	.549	2nd in NL West	–	–	–	–
HOU	1980	163	93	70	.571	1st in NL West	2	3	.400	Lost NLCS (PHI)
HOU	1981	57	28	29	.491	3rd in NL West	2	3	.400	Lost NLDS (LAD)
HOU	1981	53	33	20	.623	1st in NL West	2	3	.400	Lost NLDS (LAD)
HOU	1982	111	49	62	.441	fired	–	–	–	–
HOU total		1066	544	522	.510		4	6	.400	
MON	1983	162	82	80	.506	3rd in NL East	–	–	–	–
MON	1984	131	64	67	.489	fired	–	–	–	–
MON total		293	146	147	.498		0	0	–	
Total		1916	995	921	.519		6	9	.400	

== Personal life ==
Virdon and his wife, Shirley, married in November 1951, and lived in Springfield, Missouri. They had three daughters. Together, Bill and Shirley Virdon endowed two scholarships at Southeast Missouri State University, Shirley's alma mater, with one specifically devoted to a baseball player.

A portion of the U.S. Route 63 business route in West Plains from Grace Avenue to US 63 is named "Bill Virdon Boulevard". Virdon was inducted into the Missouri Sports Hall of Fame in 1983, and named a Missouri Sports Legend by the Missouri Sports Hall of Fame in 2012. The Independence Baseball Hall of Fame inducted Virdon in 2013. Following Whitey Herzog's election to the National Baseball Hall of Fame in 2010, Herzog indicated that he would champion Virdon's cause to the Veterans Committee in future elections.

Virdon died on November 23, 2021, at the age of 90.

== See also ==
- Houston Astros award winners and league leaders
- List of Major League Baseball annual triples leaders
- List of Major League Baseball career assists as a center fielder leaders
- List of Major League Baseball career fielding errors as a center fielder leaders
- List of Major League Baseball career games played as a center fielder leaders
- List of Major League Baseball career putouts as a center fielder leaders
