= Jerry Lynch =

American baseball player (1930–2012)

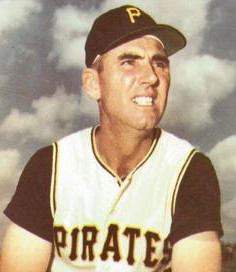
- Lynch in 1966
- Outfielder
- Born: July 17, 1930; Bay City, Michigan, U.S.
- Died: March 31, 2012 (aged 81); Austell, Georgia, U.S.
- Batted: Left Threw: Right

MLB debut
- April 15, 1954, for the Pittsburgh Pirates

Last MLB appearance
- October 2, 1966, for the Pittsburgh Pirates

MLB statistics
- Batting average: .277
- Home runs: 115
- Runs batted in: 470
- Stats at Baseball Reference

Teams
- Pittsburgh Pirates (1954–1956); Cincinnati Reds (1957–1963); Pittsburgh Pirates (1963–1966)

Career highlights and awards
- Cincinnati Reds Hall of Fame

Gerald Thomas Lynch (July 17, 1930 – March 31, 2012), nicknamed "the Hat", "Lynch the Pinch" and "the Allison Park Sweeper", was an American professional baseball outfielder who ranked among the most prolific pinch hitters in Major League Baseball (MLB) history. He played 13 seasons (1954-1966) with the Pittsburgh Pirates and Cincinnati Reds.

Lynch was a central figure for the Reds in the 1961 season, which saw them capture their first National League pennant in 21 years. He finished 22nd in the NL Most Valuable Player vote despite a mere 181 at-bats that season. In 1988, he was inducted into the Cincinnati Reds Hall of Fame.

In his career, Lynch hit .277 on 798 hits, 123 doubles, 34 triples and 115 home runs in 1,184 games. He had 470 RBI, 364 runs scored and 224 walks along with .329 on-base and .463 slugging percentages.

== Lynch in a pinch ==
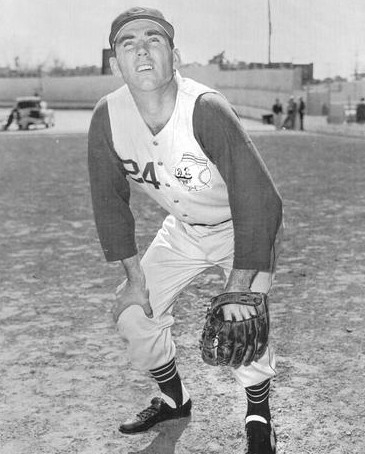
Lynch in 1961

Because of limited range in the field and an inability to hit left-handed pitchers consistently at the plate, Lynch never played more than 122 games in any season. But especially versus righties in pressure situations, he was one of the most feared pinch hitters of his era. His 116 hits off the bench rank 10th in MLB history. Lynch owned the most career pinch-hit home runs (18) at the time of his retirement and still ranks third overall.

"The best pinch hitter I ever saw, by far, no question, has to be Smoky Burgess," Lynch said of his former Reds and Pirates teammate in a 1994 Baseball Digest story. "He was gifted. But I was the best clutch hitter because I hit 18 dingers. I rang the bell 18 times. Hey, if you don't think you're the best, who will?"

In a 10-year period (1957–66), Lynch hit at least one pinch-hit homer in all except the 1960 season, when he had a then MLB-record 76 appearances off the bench. Overall, he amassed 90 RBI in 435 at-bats in that role, a rate of one per 4.8 attempts along with 18 home runs. Overall, Lynch batted .264 (115-for-435) as a pinch-hitter in his MLB career.

"The good pinch-hitter is the guy who can relax enough to get the pitch he can hit," Lynch was quoted as saying. "You almost always do get one pitch to hit every time you bat. So you have to have the patience to wait. And then you've got to be able to handle the pitch when you get it."

== Early years ==
Lynch was born on July 17, 1930, in Bay City, Michigan, where he attended Bay City Central High School. He began his pro career as a 19-year-old with the Class C Greenville (Miss.) Bucks of the Cotton States League in 1950 before the New York Yankees acquired his contract. After two years in the military, he returned to lead the Class B Piedmont League in batting average (.333), slugging percentage (.592), hits (180), triples (22) and RBI (133). Despite his obvious potential, there was little chance for advancement to the veteran-laden Yankees parent club, and the Pirates selected him in the Rule 5 Draft after the season.

Lynch made his MLB debut with the Pirates on April 15, 1954, in a 7–4 loss to the Brooklyn Dodgers at Ebbets Field. Starting in right field and batting third, he had one hit in four trips to the plate. His first hit came off pitcher Russ Meyer, a two-run single in the ninth inning.

A semi-regular in his first two seasons, Lynch was held back by injuries that resulted in a late start to the 1956 campaign, when he appeared in only 19 games. The Reds claimed him in the Rule 5 Draft in the off-season. Lynch returned to the Pirates in 1963 in a trade that sent outfielder Bob Skinner to the Reds. It was there that team broadcaster Jim Woods referred to him as The Allison Park Sweeper because of his suburban Pittsburgh residence and machine-like efficiency at the plate.

Lynch struck his final homer on August 12, 1966, a pinch-hit solo blast against the Reds that tied the score in the ninth inning of an eventual 14-11 victory in Cincinnati. It marked his final at-bat at Crosley Field, where he hit more homers (46) than any other ballpark. The Pirates released him after the season.

== Career season ==
Lynch had a remarkable 1961 season, when his timely hits repeatedly bailed out the Reds in a tight NL pennant race. He finished with a .315 batting average, .407 on-base percentage and .624 slugging percentage – all of which would be the highest of his career. He was never better as a pinch-hitter, a role in which he hit .404 and five home runs in 59 plate appearances. His 25 RBI tied a major league record that Joe Cronin (Boston Red Sox) had set in the 1943 season and Rusty Staub (New York Mets) equalled in the 1983 campaign.

On September 26 in Chicago, Lynch propelled the Reds into the World Series with a two-run home run off Cubs pitcher Bob Anderson in the seventh inning. The blow snapped a 3–3 deadlock and turned out to be the game-winner in a 5–3 victory.

Lynch did not start any of the World Series games against New York, however, even though Yankee Stadium was an easy mark for left-handed power hitters. He was hitless in three official at bats (four plate appearances), all of them as a pinch-hitter. The Reds lost the series in five games.

== Post-MLB career ==
In 1964, near the conclusion of their baseball careers, Lynch and Pirates teammate Dick Groat broke ground on Champion Lakes Golf Course in Ligonier, one of three public courses to receive a 4-star rating in Western Pennsylvania.

Lynch was in line to become Point Park College baseball coach, according to a 1978 Pittsburgh Post-Gazette story. Two days later, however, The Pittsburgh Press reported that Lynch and athletic director Jerry Conboy could not agree on contract terms.

Lynch retired to the Atlanta, Georgia, area in the late 1980s. He died on March 31, 2012, at age 81 in Austell, Georgia, and his ashes were scattered on a golf course. At the time of his death he had been married to Alice for 55 years. He had three sons: Mark, Keith and Gerald, a daughter named Kimberly, and 11 grandchildren.

"There will be no questions or discussions -- he goes straight to heaven," Groat told the Post-Gazette. "He was one of the finest people to have ever walked the earth."
