= Roy Face =

American baseball player (1928–2026)

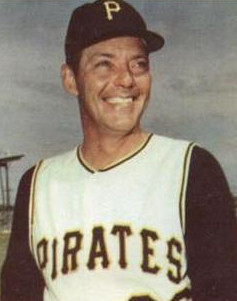
- Face in 1966
- Pitcher
- Born: February 20, 1928; Stephentown, New York, U.S.
- Died: February 12, 2026 (aged 97); North Versailles, Pennsylvania, U.S.
- Batted: Right Threw: Right

MLB debut
- April 16, 1953, for the Pittsburgh Pirates

Last MLB appearance
- August 15, 1969, for the Montreal Expos

MLB statistics
- Win–loss record: 104–95
- Earned run average: 3.48
- Strikeouts: 877
- Saves: 193
- Stats at Baseball Reference

Teams
- Pittsburgh Pirates (1953, 1955–1968); Detroit Tigers (1968); Montreal Expos (1969)

Career highlights and awards
- 6× All-Star (1959–1961²); World Series champion (1960); Pittsburgh Pirates Hall of Fame

ElRoy Leon Face (February 20, 1928 – February 12, 2026), nicknamed "The Baron of the Bullpen", (Note: From roughly mid-1959 on, Face was alternately referred to as "Bullpen Baron," "Baron of the Bullpen," and, on occasion (at least among Pittsburghers), simply "The Baron." He was so dubbed by Pittsburgh Post-Gazette beat writer Jack Hernon, although the nickname itself appears to have been coined in April 1950, regarding Cardinals reliever Ted Wilks, in a nationally syndicated story by AP's Joe Reichler.) was an American right-handed relief pitcher in Major League Baseball from 1953 to 1969, almost entirely for the Pittsburgh Pirates, with whom he made the forkball pitch famous. A pioneer of modern relief pitching in the archetype of what came to be known as the closer, he was the standard for National League relievers at the time of his retirement and set numerous records along the way.

While Face stood only 5 ft 7½ in (1.71 m) and weighed 150 pounds (68 kg), he overcame any physical shortcomings with a bulldog mentality, rubber arm and forkball that was the talk of baseball. The diminutive reliever also relied on consistent control of his pitches, which he said came naturally but teammates attributed to hard work.

A converted starter, Face held the National League records for career games pitched (846) from 1967 to 1986 and career saves (191) from 1962 to 1982. He still owns the NL record for career wins in relief (96) and held the league mark for career innings pitched in relief (1,211 1/3) until 1983.

Upon retirement, Face ranked second to Hoyt Wilhelm in saves in major league history and third in games pitched behind Wilhelm and Cy Young. He is the all-time leader in games pitched (802) and saves (188) in Pirates history.

Face played a lead role for the upstart Pirates in their victory over the New York Yankees in the 1960 World Series, when he became the first pitcher to save as many as three games in a Fall Classic. He recorded three seasons of 20 or more saves at a time when their statistical requirements were stricter than in later years. In addition, Face was the first major leaguer to save 20 games more than once. He led the league three times and also finished second thrice.

Throughout his career, Face's first name often appeared as Elroy or shortened to Roy in written form. The official spelling was ElRoy as confirmed by his signature, for which the popular ex-Pirate fulfilled numerous requests even in retirement.

== Early life ==
Face was born in Stephentown, New York, on February 20, 1928. His parents were Joseph A. Face Sr. and Bessie Rose (Williams) Face. Among other things, Joseph worked in a saw mill, as a farmer, started his own logging business, and was a teamster handling horses for the Stephentown highway department. Joseph was also a well-known square dance caller from the 1920s to the 1950s. As a child, Face frequently incurred the wrath of his father for throwing stones through glass windows.

Face was a member of the baseball team at Averill Park High School, near Albany, New York. He pitched the team to a conference championship in 1945. He then served in the U.S. Army from February 1946 to July 1947, where he was on the base softball team.

== Career ==
=== Minor leagues ===
In 1948 and 1949, Face played semipro baseball. Originally signed to play professional baseball by the Philadelphia Phillies as an amateur free agent in 1949, the 21-year-old was assigned to the Class D Bradford Blue Wings in the Pennsylvania-Ontario-New York (PONY) League. He posted a 14–2 record in his debut and was 18–5 with a 2.58 earned run average (ERA) in the next season. The Phillies left Face unprotected in the winter draft, however, and Branch Rickey and the Brooklyn Dodgers was quick to draft him in December.

In 1951, Face continued his upward trajectory in the Class A Western League with the Pueblo Dodgers (23–9 with a 2.78 ERA). He led the league in wins and was in the top-10 in ERA as well as bases on balls per nine innings pitched.

In 1952 with Fort Worth in the Double-A Texas League, Face had a 14–11 record with a 2.83 ERA. He averaged 3.1 bases on balls per nine innings and 5.8 strikeouts per nine innings pitched for Pueblo; and only 2.3 bases on balls per nine innings at Fort Worth (6th best in the Texas League among pitchers with at least 10 wins).

In his first four minor league seasons he had a 69–27 record. Rickey saw similarities between Face and Dodgers mainstay Carl Erskine, who at 5-foot-10, 165 pounds also was sleight of build. Now with the Pirates, Rickey drafted Face for a second time, this one at the 1952 Winter Meetings.

=== Pittsburgh Pirates ===
Face made his major league debut in April, 1953. He started 13 games and relieved in 28 but struggled with a 6.58 ERA. At that point in his career, he only had a fastball and curveball. In 1954, he was sent to the Pirates minor league team, the New Orleans Pelicans of the Double-A Southern Association, to learn an off-speed pitch. It was during this time that Face developed his forkball. Face was managed by Danny Murtaugh (who would later manage Face on a world champion Pirates team in 1960). Murtaugh turned Face solely into a relief pitcher that year.

Face achieved his future success almost exclusively with the forkball, which he reportedly had learned directly from New York Yankees’ reliever Joe Page. It has also been reported that Face learned the forkball by observing Page during Page's time with the Pelicans in 1954, at a time when Page was trying to make a comeback after his days pitching for the Yankees had ended.

Face returned to the Pirates for the 1955 season, when he appeared in 42 games as both a starter and reliever. He had a 5–7 record and 3.58 ERA. In 1956, he set a modern Pirates record for games pitched (68), leading the league and breaking the club mark of 59 set by Bill Werle in 1951. Of those 68 games, only 3 were starts. He was 12–13 in 135.1 innings, pitching in 9 straight games in September 1956 to tie a big league record.

In 1957 he saved 10 games for the first time, finishing fifth in the NL; and started a game for the last time in his career. In 1958 the team finished in second place, the first time in his five years they had placed better than seventh. Face led the NL with 20 saves, and posted his best earned run average to date with a 2.89 mark, finishing 17th in NL Most Valuable Player (MVP) voting.

In 1959 Face posted an 18–1 record, including 17 victories in a row to begin the year, after ending 1958 with five in a row. The 22 game win streak went from June 7, 1958, to September 10, 1959, before he lost to the Los Angeles Dodgers on September 11, 1959. This loss was Face's first in 99 appearances since 1958. Face did not surrender a run in the entire period from June 11 to July 12. He was named the Player of the Month for June after posting a 5–0 record with four saves and a 0.38 ERA. Face finished the year with an ERA of 2.70, and finished seventh in the MVP voting, although he did not receive any votes for the Cy Young Award that year. (At the time, only first-place votes were cast for the award.) His 18 relief wins remain the major league record, topping Jim Konstanty's previous mark of 16 set in 1950. Face's .947 winning percentage exceeded the previous record .938 (15–1), set by Johnny Allen in 1937. In each of the victories, Face pitched at least one inning out of the bullpen. Eight times he hurled three frames or more. His season-high came against the Cubs on June 18 in Chicago, where he pitched five scoreless innings to nail down a 4-2 triumph in 13 innings that extended his personal streak to 11 in a row.

In 1960, Face had his second 20-save season, placing second in the league with 24. This equaled the previous NL record, with St. Louis Cardinal reliever Lindy McDaniel setting a new save mark with 26. With the Pirates winning their first pennant since 1927, he also led the league in games again, tying his own team record of 68. The mark stood until 1966, when teammate Pete Mikkelsen appeared in 71 games.

In 1960, Face led the NL in pitching appearances, pitched 114.2 innings, saved 24 games, and had a 2.90 ERA. In the 1960 World Series against the New York Yankees, Face became the first pitcher to save three games in a single Series (formally credited after saves became an official statistic in 1969). Face pitched 10.1 innings in the series, and saved Games 1, 4, and 5 for the Pirates.

Face entered Game 1 with runners on first and second and none out in the eighth inning, leading 6–2; he retired the side, striking out Mickey Mantle and Bill Skowron and getting Yogi Berra to fly out, before giving up a 2-run Elston Howard home run in the ninth but getting a game-ending double play for a 6–4 win. He came into Game 4 with two men on and one out in the seventh inning, leading 3–2, and retired all eight men he faced. In Game 5, he was again brought in with two men on and one out in the seventh, this time leading 4–2, and retired eight of the last nine batters, allowing only a walk to Mantle.

In the final Game 7, Face was brought in with two on and none out in the sixth inning, with a 4–1 lead which he surrendered via an RBI single by Mantle and a three-run home run by Berra. He settled down, however, retiring seven of the next eight batters before allowing another two-run rally with two out in the eighth for a 7–4 Yankee lead. The Pirates came back to score five runs in the bottom of the inning after Face was pulled for a pinch-hitter, and won the game and the Series in the bottom of the ninth on Bill Mazeroski's home run.

Two months later, Face gained more nation-wide notoriety on the Ed Sullivan Show , where the host handed the pitcher a baseball to illustrate his money pitch to the audience.

"Well, Ed, I hold it between my first two fingers like that without any seams, and I throw it straight overhand like the fastball," Face explained. "And the ball will usually sink."

"I think that's unfair to our organized Yankees," Sullivan replied, to which Face could only smile.

Face was selected to play in the All-Star each year from 1959 to 1961, including both All-Star Games in 1959, the first of which was held in Pittsburgh. He pitched in each game that season. Face again led the NL with 17 saves in 1961. In 1962 he broke McDaniel's NL record with a career-high 28 saves (one short of Luis Arroyo's major league mark set the previous year), also posting a 1.88 ERA; Ted Abernathy would set a new record in 1965 with 31 saves. At that point, Face had three 20-save seasons at a time when no other pitcher had more than one. Also in 1962, he passed Clem Labine for the NL record in career saves (95) then broke Johnny Murphy's major league mark (107).

In 1963, Face earned 16 saves before he suffered two difficult seasons, picking up only four saves in 1964 with an ERA over 5.00 and none in 1965, when a knee injury put him on the disabled list for the first time in his career.

In 1964, Hoyt Wilhelm took over the major league career save record. But Face returned to save 18 games in 1966 and 17 in 1967, finishing second in the NL in both years. In 1967, he appeared in 61 games, going 7-5 with a 2.45 ERA. In 1967, he passed Warren Spahn's mark of 750 to become the NL's all-time leader in games pitched. Face ultimately pitched in 846 NL games, a record that would stand until 39-year old Kent Tekulve moved ahead of him in 1986. (Face pitched in 848 total games, including two with the American League Detroit Tigers, a total which Tekulve surpassed by over 200).

After 43 appearances, 13 saves, and a 2.60 ERA for the Pirates in 1968, Face's contract was sold to the Detroit Tigers on August 31. At the time he left the Pirates, Face held the NL records for games pitched (802), games in relief (775), games finished (547), and relief wins (92); and was second to Hoyt Wilhelm in all those categories for major league records.

=== Detroit Tigers and Montreal Expos ===
In 1968, Face made only two scoreless appearances for Detroit, pitching one inning in total. The Tigers went to the 1968 World Series, but Face was not included on the roster. He was released by the Tigers in early April 1969.

He signed as a free agent with the Montreal Expos in late April 1969, earning five saves in 44 games before ending his major league career. In 1970, he pitched 8 games in Triple A for the Hawaii Islanders.

== Legacy and honors ==
In a 16-season career, Face posted a 104–95 record with a 3.48 ERA and 877 strikeouts in 1375 innings pitched and 848 games. His NL record of 193 saves was not broken until 1982, when Bruce Sutter passed him; Dave Giusti broke his Pirates single-season mark with 30 in 1971. Tug McGraw surpassed his league record for career innings in relief in 1983. Face's 802 games with the Pirates equaled Walter Johnson's total with the Washington Senators for the most by any pitcher with a single club; the record was broken by Trevor Hoffman of the San Diego Padres in 2007. Face saved 16 or more games seven times in an era when starting pitchers were more apt to remain in a game they were leading, and seven times had an ERA under 3.00 with at least 40 appearances.

In February 1999, Face, along with Hall of Famer Steve Carlton, was admitted to the pitcher's wing—namely, the Pitchers' Wall of Great Achievement—of the Ted Williams Museum and Hitters Hall of Fame.

He is a member of the Pirates Hall of Fame, is the team's all-time leader in pitching appearances (802), and holds the National League record for wins by a relief pitcher (96). Under the official standards for saves adopted well after his career was at its height, Face would have a total of 188 saves, a Pirate record. Face was the Sporting News Fireman of the Year in 1962.

== Personal life and death ==
During his baseball career, Face, in keeping with a family tradition extending back two generations, worked as a carpenter during the off-season. Following his retirement, this became his full-time occupation, and beginning in 1979, Face served as the carpentry foreman at Mayview State Hospital until his retirement in 1990. Face was a longtime resident of North Versailles, Pennsylvania.

Face died on February 12, 2026, at the age of 97.

== See also ==
- List of Major League Baseball annual saves leaders

== Notes ==
Awards and achievements
Preceded by Johnny Murphy	All-Time Saves Leader; 1962–1963	Succeeded by Hoyt Wilhelm
Preceded by Hank Aaron & Harvey Haddix	Major League Player of the Month; June 1959	Succeeded by Vern Law & Willie McCovey
Preceded by Stu Miller	Sporting News National League Reliever of the Year; 1962	Succeeded by Lindy McDaniel
