= Don Hoak =

American baseball player (1928–1969)

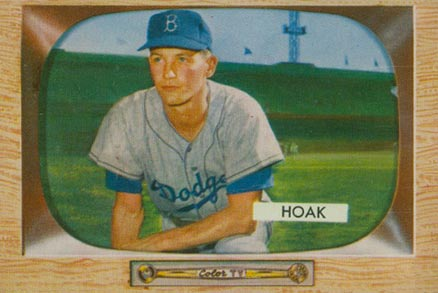
- Third baseman
- Born: February 5, 1928; Roulette Township, Pennsylvania, U.S.
- Died: October 9, 1969 (aged 41); Pittsburgh, Pennsylvania, U.S.
- Batted: Right Threw: Right

MLB debut
- April 18, 1954, for the Brooklyn Dodgers

Last MLB appearance
- May 12, 1964, for the Philadelphia Phillies

MLB statistics
- Batting average: .265
- Home runs: 89
- Runs batted in: 498
- Stats at Baseball Reference

Teams
- Brooklyn Dodgers (1954–1955); Chicago Cubs (1956); Cincinnati Redlegs (1957–1958); Pittsburgh Pirates (1959–1962); Philadelphia Phillies (1963–1964)

Career highlights and awards
- All-Star (1957); 2× World Series champion (1955, 1960)

Donald Albert Hoak (February 5, 1928 – October 9, 1969), nicknamed "Tiger", was an American professional baseball third baseman and coach. He played eleven seasons in Major League Baseball (MLB) (1954–1964) for the Brooklyn Dodgers, Chicago Cubs, Cincinnati Redlegs, Pittsburgh Pirates, and Philadelphia Phillies.

== Early career ==
Hoak broke into the professional baseball in 1947 after a stint in the United States Navy towards the end of World War II. He signed with the Brooklyn Dodgers organization and worked his way up the organization based almost solely on his glove, speed on the bases and tenacity. In 1954, Hoak's patience was rewarded by a spot on the Dodgers' roster.

During his two seasons with the Dodgers, Hoak shared third base duties with Jackie Robinson and Billy Cox. In 1955, the Dodgers defeated the New York Yankees in the World Series to win their only championship in Brooklyn. Hoak played third base in place of Robinson in the seventh and deciding game of that Series—the only World Series game Robinson did not play in during his career when his team was in the World Series.

After the season, Hoak was traded to the Chicago Cubs. In 1956, Hoak batted .215 with 5 home runs and 37 runs batted in, and also set a National League record by striking out six times in one game, against six different pitchers, in which 48 players were used in a 17-inning marathon on May 2, won by the visiting New York Giants 6-5.

== Cincinnati, Pittsburgh, and Philadelphia ==
After the 1956 season, the Cubs traded Hoak to the Cincinnati Redlegs in a five-player deal. In 1957 Hoak improved his batting average to .293, after leading the league well into May at over .400, and set career highs in home runs (19) and runs batted in (89), as well as leading the National League in doubles with 39. In a game against the Milwaukee Braves on April 21, Hoak was involved in a controversial play that would lead to a change in the rules. He was on second base and teammate Gus Bell was on first, when Wally Post hit a ground ball to short. Hoak broke up a potential double play by fielding the ball himself and flipping it to Milwaukee shortstop Johnny Logan. Hoak was called out for interference, but Post was given a single on the play. The day before, Johnny Temple let Bell's ground ball hit him with the same result, Temple being called out for interference and Bell being awarded a single. The two incidents prompted league presidents Warren Giles and Will Harridge to jointly announce a rule change that declared both the runner and batter out if the runner intentionally interferes with a batted ball, with no runners allowed to advance. (Without the new rule, it was sometimes advantageous for a runner to touch a batted ball, because doing so avoided a double play. In the plays already mentioned, Temple and Hoak were out according to a still-existing rule: a runner is out if a batted ball touches him in fair territory before it touches a fielder, with the batter getting a single and no runner advancing unless forced.)

In 1957 Hoak made his only All-Star appearance, but it also would be mired in controversy—though not of Hoak's doing. At the time, as they do currently, fans had the right to vote for the starters (minus the starting pitchers). As a result, a ballot stuffing campaign by Reds fans resulted in Hoak, Post, Temple, Bell, Ed Bailey, Roy McMillan, and Frank Robinson being voted into the starting lineup. First baseman George Crowe, the eventual team home run leader with 31, was the only Red not selected; the fans instead voted for Stan Musial. (Crowe would be selected to the All-Star team in 1958—the only Red so honored.) Commissioner Ford Frick removed Bell and Post from the starting lineup and replaced them with Willie Mays and Hank Aaron; Bell remained on the team as a reserve, but Post was taken off altogether. Frick also stripped the fans of the right to vote for the starters, which they had held since 1947 and would not hold again until 1970 (ironically, the Reds’ newly opened Riverfront Stadium would host the All-Star Game that year). In the third inning of the 1957 game, Hoak grounded out to shortstop Harvey Kuenn in his only plate appearance. He was replaced by Eddie Mathews.

Hoak batted .261 for the Reds during the 1958 season before being traded, along with Harvey Haddix and Smoky Burgess, to the Pittsburgh Pirates for four players (one of whom was Frank Thomas) in January 1959. It was Hoak's throwing error that cost Haddix his perfect game against the Braves after the pitcher had retired 36 batters in a row on May 26, 1959. The Braves went on to win that game, 1-0. In 1960, Hoak batted .282 on a Pirates team that won the World Series; like the 1955 Brooklyn Dodgers, Pittsburgh defeated the Yankees in seven games. The Pirates won the 1960 Series on Bill Mazeroski's ninth-inning home run in Game Seven. During the Pirates’ championship season, Hoak finished second in National League Most Valuable Player Award vote to teammate Dick Groat.

Hoak batted a career-high .298 during the 1961 season, but slumped to .241 in 1962. After the 1962 season, the Pirates traded him to the Philadelphia Phillies for Pancho Herrera and Ted Savage. He batted .231 during the 1963 season, then was released in May 1964 after making only six plate appearances—all in pinch-hitting roles. Hoak retired forthwith, but returned to the Phillies as a scout for the final month of the season—during which the Phillies lost the pennant to the St. Louis Cardinals by one game after leading the National League by 6 1/2 games with two weeks remaining.

Don Hoak also played in the Dominican Republic during the 1956 season with the Escogido team. In those days the radio announcer called him "el loquito Hoak" (crazy Hoak) for his risky plays which contributed to his team winning several games and the season. In a final series, a game was won when he stole home after making the pitcher nervous several times, moving between third and home.

== Hoak and Jill Corey ==
Hoak was married to singer/actress Jill Corey, whom he first met at Forbes Field during the Pirates' 1960 season. Hoak pursued Corey for a year afterward, even convincing her to break up with her boyfriend, a Brazilian diplomat. The two wed on December 27, 1961; the marriage bore a daughter, Clare.

== Post-playing career ==
After retiring as an active player, Hoak worked as a Pirates' broadcaster in 1965 and 1966, a coach for the Phillies in 1967, and a manager in the Pirates' farm system from 1968 until 1969. In 1968, he managed the Salem Redbirds of the Carolina League to an 85-55 record. Hoak then moved up to the Pirates' Triple A club, the Columbus Jets of the International League, whom he managed to a 74-66 record in 1969.

== Career statistics ==
In 11 seasons covering 1,263 games, Hoak compiled a .265 batting average (1144-for-4322) with 598 runs, 214 doubles, 44 triples, 89 home runs, 498 runs batted in, 64 stolen bases, 523 base on balls, 530 strikeouts, .345 on-base percentage and .396 slugging percentage. Defensively, he recorded a .959 fielding percentage. In the postseason, in 2 World Series (1955 and 1960) he batted .231 (6-for-26) with 3 runs and 3 runs batted in .

== Death ==
During the 1969 season, the Pirates' managerial post was left vacant when Larry Shepard was fired with one week remaining, and Alex Grammas served as interim manager for the final five games. After two successful minor league seasons, Hoak believed himself a contender to manage the parent club. Instead, the team announced on October 9 that Danny Murtaugh, who managed the Pirates' 1960 World Championship team, was to return for what would be his third of four stints with the club. (Murtaugh had resigned after the 1967 season for medical reasons, and accepted a position in the Pirates' front office. He asked to reclaim the managerial position after the 1969 season, and was re-hired after receiving medical clearance. Murtaugh would lead the Pirates to a second World Series title in 1971.) Hoak’s wife delivered the news of Murtaugh’s hiring to Hoak.

Less than two hours later, Hoak witnessed his brother-in-law's car being stolen from the driveway of the Hoak house. Hoak got into his own car and gave chase. He suffered a heart attack during the pursuit, but managed to stop his vehicle at Amberson Towers just before collapsing. He lay in his car for 20 minutes without anyone’s interceding. A doctor who claims he had been driving behind Hoak at the time eventually got out of his own car and performed cardiac massage before an ambulance transported Hoak to the hospital. However, despite efforts to save his life, Hoak died 10 minutes after arrival. Jill Corey claimed that her husband had died of a broken heart because the Pirates had passed him over.

== Cinema reference ==
In the film City Slickers starring Billy Crystal, Hoak was the answer to a trivia question posed by character Bonnie Rayburn, played by Helen Slater, in which Bonnie expressed her incredulity that men could discuss baseball at great length. She stated "I've been to games, but I don't memorize who played third base for Pittsburgh in 1960," at which point Crystal, Daniel Stern and Bruno Kirby immediately reply "Don Hoak."

== See also ==
- List of Major League Baseball annual doubles leaders
