= Danny Murtaugh =

American baseball player and manager (1917–1976)

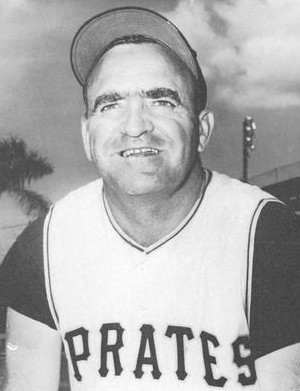
- Second baseman / Manager
- Born: October 8, 1917; Chester, Pennsylvania, U.S.
- Died: December 2, 1976 (aged 59); Upland, Pennsylvania, U.S.
- Batted: Right Threw: Right

MLB debut
- July 3, 1941, for the Philadelphia Phillies

Last MLB appearance
- September 6, 1951, for the Pittsburgh Pirates

MLB statistics
- Batting average: .254
- Home runs: 8
- Runs batted in: 219
- Managerial record: 1,115–950
- Winning %: .540
- Stats at Baseball Reference
- Managerial record at Baseball Reference

Teams
- As player: Philadelphia Phillies (1941–1943, 1946); Boston Braves (1947); Pittsburgh Pirates (1948–1951); As manager: Pittsburgh Pirates (1957–1964, 1967, 1970–1971, 1973–1976); As coach: Pittsburgh Pirates (1956–1957)

Career highlights and awards
- 2× World Series champion (1960, 1971); NL stolen base leader (1941); Pittsburgh Pirates No. 40 retired; Pittsburgh Pirates Hall of Fame

Daniel Edward Murtaugh (October 8, 1917 – December 2, 1976) was an American second baseman, manager, front-office executive, and coach in Major League Baseball (MLB). He played from 1941 to 1951 as a second baseman, with 416 of his 767 career MLB games coming with the Pirates. Murtaugh is best known for his 29-year association with the Pittsburgh Pirates, of which he served as coach for two seasons before becoming manager in 1957, where he would manage in four separate stints from 1957 to 1976. The 1960 team won the World Series in seven games under Murtaugh's leadership for their first championship in 35 years. Health problems forced him to step down to become involved in the front office in 1964, but he would return as manager for the latter half of the 1967 season and a full-time basis in 1970, where the team proceeded to win back-to-back National League East titles, with 1971 seeing them win the World Series for the second time in 11 years.

He again resigned due to health problems after 1971 for the front office, but he returned for one further stint in the latter end of the 1973 season and led the team to two more NL East championships before retiring for the last time in 1976; he suffered a fatal stroke just months after retiring. A winner of over 1,000 games with two World championships, four division titles, and nine of 12 full seasons with a winning record, his number 40 jersey was retired by the Pirates in 1977.

== Life and career ==
=== As player ===
Murtaugh appeared in all or parts of nine big-league seasons, initially for the Philadelphia Phillies (1941–43, 1946) and Boston Braves (1947) before joining the Pirates (1948–51). He threw and batted right-handed and was listed as 5 feet 9 inches (1.75 m) tall and 165 pounds (75 kg).

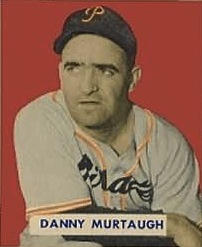
Murtaugh's 1949 Bowman Gum baseball card

A native of Chester, Pennsylvania, Murtaugh was working with his father at Sun Shipbuilding & Drydock Co. after he graduated from Chester High School when he took a pay cut to start his professional baseball career at age 19 in 1937. After signing with the St. Louis Cardinals, he joined the Redbirds' extensive farm system, initially as a member of the Cambridge (Maryland) Cardinals of the Class D Eastern Shore League. In June 1941, in the midst of Murtaugh's second consecutive stellar season with the Houston Buffaloes of the Texas League, the Phillies purchased his contract; he then made his MLB debut on July 3 as a defensive replacement for Hal Marnie against Boston at Braves Field. The following day he started both ends of a July 4 doubleheader and essentially took over as the Phils' regular second baseman.

As a rookie, Murtaugh led the National League in stolen bases with 18, even though he played only 85 games after his acquisition from Houston in late June. In 1942–43 he got into 257 games before joining the United States Army in August 1943 for World War II service. He declined the opportunity to play baseball in the United States and served in combat with the 97th Infantry in Germany.

Returning to baseball in 1946, he played in only six games for Philadelphia before he was sold back to the Cardinals' organization. At Triple-A Rochester, Murtaugh hit.322 and his 174 hits were tied for first in the International League. The Braves then selected him in the 1946 Rule 5 draft, but Murtaugh played in only three early-season games for them before he was again sent to Triple-A. At 29, he had another good offensive season, hitting.302 for Milwaukee. Although his performance did not earn Murtaugh a return to the Braves, it led to perhaps his biggest break when, on November 18, Boston included him in a five-player trade to the Pirates, where he spent the rest of his big-league career.

His most productive season came in his first year with the Bucs, 1948, when he hit.290 and posted career highs in hits (149), runs batted in (71), runs scored (56), doubles (21), triples (5) and games played (146). He started a career-high 145 games as the Pirates' second baseman. After a subpar 1949, Murtaugh rebounded by hitting a personal-best.294 in 1950. Overall, Murtaugh was a.254 career lifetime batter with 661 hits, eight home runs and 219 RBI in 767 games.

=== As manager ===
After retiring as a player, Murtaugh managed the New Orleans Pelicans (1952–54), the Pirates' Double-A farm club, and the unaffiliated Triple-A Charleston Senators (April 19–July 16, 1955). In 1956 he returned to the Pirates as a coach under Bobby Bragan. In his second year in the job, on August 4, 1957, he succeeded Bragan as skipper with the Bucs 36–67 and one game out of last place; under Murtaugh, they perked up to win 26 of their final 51 games. In his first full season, 1958, Murtaugh led the Pirates to a surprise second-place finish in the National League. He went on to hold the Pittsburgh job for all or parts of fifteen seasons over four different terms (1957–64, 1967, 1970–71, 1973–76).

In 1960, his third full season as their manager, Murtaugh guided the Bucs to the first of the two World Series championships they won under his command. After they captured the National League pennant by seven full games over the Milwaukee Braves, they stunned the heavy-hitting New York Yankees in the 1960 World Series—won in Pittsburgh's last at bat by Bill Mazeroski's walk-off home run in the ninth inning of Game 7. The Yankees outscored Pittsburgh 55–27, and administered three thrashings (16–3, 10–0 and 12–0), but the resilient Pirates took the other four contests by a run differential of only +7 (6–4, 3–2, 5–2 and 10–9).

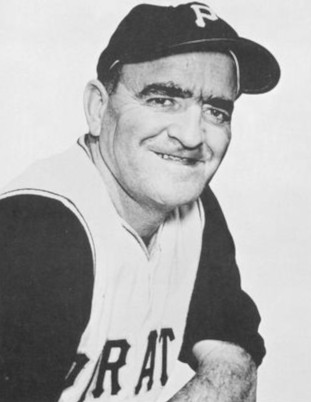
Murtaugh, circa 1964

From 1961 to 1964, his Pirates had only one over-.500 season and, after the conclusion of the 1964 campaign, Murtaugh stepped down as manager just before his 47th birthday. He had been battling health problems, sometimes reported as a heart ailment. He moved up to the Pirate front office as a key assistant in charge of evaluating players for general manager Joe L. Brown. After the 1965 season, he turned down feelers from the Boston Red Sox to join their organization as vice president, player personnel. Then, in 1967, when his immediate successor as the Pirates' manager, Harry Walker, was fired July 17, Murtaugh returned as interim pilot for the remainder of the 1967 season, after which he returned to the front office.

Well aware of the abundance of talent in the Pittsburgh system, Murtaugh asked to reclaim the managing job after Larry Shepard was fired in the last week of the 1969 season. Once medically cleared, he began his third term as skipper of the Pirates on October 9, 1969; hours after Murtaugh's re-hiring, Don Hoak, 41, his third baseman on the 1960 World Series champions and a manager in the Pirates' farm system, died of a heart attack after believing he was a leading contender to manage the parent club.

Murtaugh's first two clubs won the 1970–71 National League East Division titles. Although the 1970 squad fell in that season's National League Championship Series to the Cincinnati Reds, Murtaugh's 1971 Pirates would bounce back. On September 1, 1971, Murtaugh was the first manager in major league history to field a starting lineup consisting of nine black players (including both African Americans and Afro-Latin Americans); the Pirates beat the Phillies 10–7 in that game. The next month, they defeated the San Francisco Giants in the NLCS and then captured the 1971 World Series with a memorable comeback from a two-games-to-none deficit against the favored Baltimore Orioles. That World Series was marked by the brilliant performance of future Baseball Hall of Famer Roberto Clemente, who batted.414 with twelve hits to lead his team to the championship.

Citing renewed health concerns — he had been hospitalized for chest pain during the 1971 season — Murtaugh again resigned as manager after the world title. He moved back into the Pittsburgh front office, and his hand-picked successor, Bill Virdon (center fielder for his 1960 champions), took over for 1972 — although Murtaugh, as manager of the reigning World Series champs, did return to uniform to manage the National League entry in the 1972 Major League Baseball All-Star Game in Atlanta, a 4–3 triumph for the Senior Circuit.

With the 1973 Pirates scuffling with a 67–69 mark on September 5, Brown fired Virdon and asked Murtaugh to take command of the team. Murtaugh reluctantly returned to managing, his fourth term in the post, and stayed through the 1976 season, winning NL East titles in 1974 and 1975 but falling to the Los Angeles Dodgers and the Reds in the NLCS in successive years. After a second-place finish in 1976, both Murtaugh and Brown announced their retirements during the final week of the season.

== Death and legacy ==
Murtaugh suffered a stroke on November 30, 1976, just two months after retiring. After falling into a coma, he died at age 59 on December 2 at Crozer-Chester Medical Center in Upland, Pennsylvania. His funeral occurred on December 6 at Our Lady of Peace Roman Catholic Church in Folsom, Pennsylvania, attended by over 800 people, including multiple members of the Pirates organization: Willie Stargell, Bill Robinson, Bruce Kison, Dave Giusti, Larry Demery, Jim Rooker, Al Oliver, and Bob Robertson. Coaches Don Leppert and José Pagán also attended, along with Steve Blass and Manny Sanguillen. Afterwards, a 70-car procession led Murtaugh's body to its resting place at Sts. Peter and Paul Cemetery in Marple Township. The number 40 he wore as the Bucs' manager was retired by the Pirates on April 7, 1977.

Murtaugh was a two-time winner (1960 and 1971) of The Sporting News Manager of the Year Award. He compiled a 1,115–950–3 record in 2,068 games (.540), second in Pirates history behind only Fred Clarke. In addition to his two National League pennants and world championships, he won four Eastern Division titles (1970–1971-1974–1975), and no Pirates manager has won more division titles in their tenure since his death. In twelve full seasons as manager, he led the Pirates to a winning record nine times; his five postseason appearances with the Pirates is still the most by any manager in team history.

== Managerial record ==
Team	Year	Regular season					Postseason			
Team	Year	Games	Won	Lost	Win %	Finish	Won	Lost	Win %	Result
PIT	1957	51	26	25	.510	7th in NL	–	–	–	–
PIT	1958	154	84	70	.545	2nd in NL	–	–	–	–
PIT	1959	155	78	76	.506	4th in NL	–	–	–	–
PIT	1960	155	95	59	.617	1st in NL	4	3	.571	Won World Series (NYY)
PIT	1961	154	75	79	.487	6th in NL	–	–	–	–
PIT	1962	161	93	68	.578	4th in NL	–	–	–	–
PIT	1963	162	74	88	.457	8th in NL	–	–	–	–
PIT	1964	162	80	82	.494	6th in NL	–	–	–	–
PIT	1967	79	39	39	.500	6th in NL	–	–	–	–
PIT	1970	162	89	73	.549	1st in NL East	0	3	.000	Lost NLCS (CIN)
PIT	1971	162	97	65	.599	1st in NL East	7	4	.636	Won World Series (BAL)
PIT	1973	26	13	13	.500	3rd in NL East	–	–	–	–
PIT	1974	162	88	74	.543	1st in NL East	1	3	.250	Lost NLCS (LAD)
PIT	1975	161	92	69	.571	1st in NL East	0	3	.000	Lost NLCS (CIN)
PIT	1976	162	92	70	.568	2nd in NL East	–	–	–	–
Total		2,068 (Note: Murtaugh also managed in three games that ended in a tie)	1115	950	.540		12	16	.429	

== Highlights ==
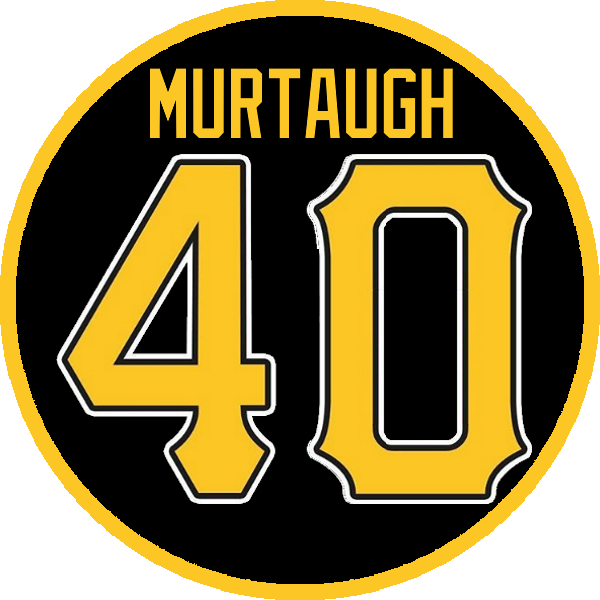
Danny Murtaugh's number 40 was retired by the Pittsburgh Pirates in 1977.

- Led NL in stolen bases (1941)
- Led NL second basemen in putouts, assists and double plays (1948)
- Finished 9th in the NL MVP selection (1948)
- Selected "Man of the Year" by Sport magazine (1960)
- Twice received The Sporting News Manager of the Year Award (1960, 1970)
- Three-time Dapper Dan Award-winner (1958, 1970, 1971)
- One of 65 managers in major league history to win 1,000 or more games, and one of only twelve to win 1,000 games while also not losing 1,000 games

== See also ==
- List of Major League Baseball retired numbers
- List of Major League Baseball annual stolen base leaders
- List of Major League Baseball managers with most career wins
- Tim Murtaugh
