= 1960 Pittsburgh Pirates season =

Major League Baseball season

1960 Pittsburgh Pirates
- World Series champions National League champions
- League: National League
- Ballpark: Forbes Field
- City: Pittsburgh, Pennsylvania
- Record: 95–59 (.617)
- Divisional place: 1st
- Owners: John W. Galbreath (majority shareholder); Bing Crosby, Thomas P. Johnson (minority shareholders)
- General managers: Joe L. Brown
- Managers: Danny Murtaugh
- Television: KDKA-TV 2 (Bob Prince, Jim Woods)
- Radio: KDKA–AM 1020 (Bob Prince, Paul Long, Jim Woods)
- Stats: ESPN.com; Baseball Reference

The 1960 Pittsburgh Pirates season was the team's 79th season. The team finished with a record of 95–59, seven games in front of the second-place Milwaukee Braves to win their first National League championship in 33 seasons. The team went on to play the heavily favored New York Yankees, whom they defeated 4 games to 3 in one of the most storied World Series ever.

== Offseason ==
At the 1959 Winter Meetings, Pirates general manager Joe L. Brown had agreed to trade Dick Groat to the Kansas City Athletics in exchange for Roger Maris. Pirates manager Danny Murtaugh had advised Brown that he did not want to lose Groat, and the deal was never finalized. Maris was eventually traded to the Yankees, and both players would go on to win the MVP for their respective leagues and face each other in the World Series.

=== Notable transactions ===
- Prior to 1960 season: José Martínez was signed as an amateur free agent by the Pirates.

== Season standings ==
=== National League ===
National League
Team	W	L	Pct.	GB	Home	Road
Pittsburgh Pirates	95	59	.617	—	52‍–‍25	43‍–‍34
Milwaukee Braves	88	66	.571	7	51‍–‍26	37‍–‍40
St. Louis Cardinals	86	68	.558	9	51‍–‍26	35‍–‍42
Los Angeles Dodgers	82	72	.532	13	42‍–‍35	40‍–‍37
San Francisco Giants	79	75	.513	16	45‍–‍32	34‍–‍43
Cincinnati Reds	67	87	.435	28	37‍–‍40	30‍–‍47
Chicago Cubs	60	94	.390	35	33‍–‍44	27‍–‍50
Philadelphia Phillies	59	95	.383	36	31‍–‍46	28‍–‍49

=== Record vs. opponents ===
1960 National League record Sources:
Team	CHC	CIN	LAD	MIL	PHI	PIT	SF	STL
Chicago	—	10–12	9–13	7–15	10–12	7–15	9–13–1	8–14–1
Cincinnati	12–10	—	12–10	9–13	9–13	6–16	11–11	8–14
Los Angeles	13–9	10–12	—	12–10	16–6	11–11	10–12	10–12
Milwaukee	15–7	13–9	10–12	—	16–6	9–13	14–8	11–11
Philadelphia	12–10	13–9	6–16	6–16	—	7–15	8–14	7–15
Pittsburgh	15–7	16–6	11–11	13–9	15–7	—	14–8–1	11–11
San Francisco	13–9–1	11–11	12–10	8–14	14–8	8–14–1	—	13–9
St. Louis	14–8–1	14–8	12–10	11–11	15–7	11–11	9–13	—

== Regular season ==
On September 6, team captain Dick Groat was drilled on his left wrist by an inside pitch from Braves pitcher Lew Burdette. Groat was lost for the rest of the season. Dick Schofield stepped in for the injured Groat and went three for three in that September 6 game. The Pirates won the game 5–3 and Schofield would go on to hit .414 for the rest of the season.

On September 25 in Milwaukee, the Pirates clinched their first pennant in 33 years.

=== Opening Day Lineup ===
Opening Day Lineup
#	Name	Position
12	Don Hoak	3B
24	Dick Groat	SS
4	Bob Skinner	LF
7	Dick Stuart	1B
21	Roberto Clemente	RF
6	Smoky Burgess	C
20	Gino Cimoli	CF
9	Bill Mazeroski	2B
19	Bob Friend	SP

=== Notable transactions ===
- May 28, 1960: Julián Javier and Ed Bauta were traded by the Pirates to the St. Louis Cardinals for Vinegar Bend Mizell and Dick Gray.
- September 1, 1960: Mickey Vernon was signed as a free agent by the Pirates.
- September 30, 1960: Mickey Vernon was released by the Pirates.

=== Roster ===
1960 Pittsburgh Pirates
Roster
Pitchers: 37,48 Tom Cheney; 29 Bennie Daniels; 26 Roy Face; 29,47 Earl Francis; 19 Bob Friend; 22 Joe Gibbon; 28 Paul Giel; 35 Fred Green; 38 Don Gross; 31 Harvey Haddix; 29 Clem Labine; 32 Vern Law; 30 Vinegar Bend Mizell; 38 Diomedes Olivo; 37 Jim Umbricht; 30,39 George Witt	Catchers: 6 Smoky Burgess; 10 Danny Kravitz; 2 Bob Oldis; 5 Hal Smith; Infielders: 16 Gene Baker; 8 Dick Barone; 24 Dick Groat; 12 Don Hoak; 9 Bill Mazeroski; 14 Rocky Nelson; 11 Dick Schofield; 3 R. C. Stevens; 7 Dick Stuart	Outfielders: 23 Joe Christopher; 20 Gino Cimoli; 21 Roberto Clemente; 4 Bob Skinner; 18 Bill Virdon; Other batters: 15 Harry Bright; 15 Román Mejías; 42 Mickey Vernon	Manager: 40 Danny Murtaugh; Coaches: 41 Bill Burwell (pitching); 45 Lenny Levy (hitting); 43 Sam Narron (bullpen); 44 Frank Oceak (third base); -- Virgil Trucks (batting practice pitcher); 42 Mickey Vernon (first base)

== Game log ==
=== Regular season ===
Legend
	Pirates win
	Pirates loss
	Postponement
	Clinched pennant
**Bold**	Pirates team member

1960 regular season game log: 95–59 (Home: 52–25; Away: 43–34)
April: 11–3 (Home: 8–2; Away: 3–1)

#	Date	Time (ET)	Opponent	Score	Win	Loss	Save	Time of Game	Attendance	Record	Box/ Streak
1	April 12	2:30 p.m. EST	@ Braves	3–4	McMahon (1–0)	**Face** (0–1)	Burdette (1)	2:37	39,888	0–1	L1
2	April 14	1:30 p.m. EST	Reds	13–0	**Law** (1–0)	McLish (0–1)	—	2:13	34,064	1–1	W1
3	April 16	1:30 p.m. EST	Reds	3–11	Hook (1–0)	**Umbricht** (0–1)	—	2:23	14,338	1–2	L1
4	April 17 (1)	1:00 p.m. EST	Reds	5–0	**Friend** (1–0)	Nuxhall (0–1)	—	2:02	—	2–2	W1
5	April 17 (2)	3:37 p.m. EST	Reds	6–5	**Gibbon** (1–0)	Wieand (0–1)	—	2:40	16,196	3–2	W2
6	April 19	8:15 p.m. EST	Phillies	3–4	Owens (1–0)	**Haddix** (0–1)	—	2:23	11,443	3–3	L1
7	April 20	8:15 p.m. EST	Phillies	4–2	**Law** (2–0)	Cardwell (1–1)	—	2:04	10,403	4–3	W1
8	April 21	8:15 p.m. EST	Phillies	11–5	**Green** (1–0)	Robinson (0–1)	**Face** (1)	3:08	9,451	5–3	W2
9	April 22	8:15 p.m. EST	Braves	6–2	**Friend** (2–0)	Jay (0–1)	—	2:37	29,895	6–3	W3
10	April 23	1:30 p.m. EST	Braves	5–4	**Gibbon** (2–0)	Burdette (1–1)	—	2:39	15,502	7–3	W4
11	April 24	2:00 p.m. EDT	Braves	7–3	**Haddix** (1–1)	Buhl (1–1)	**Face** (2)	2:17	24,758	8–3	W5
—	April 26		@ Phillies	**Postponed (Rain)** (Makeup date: July 8)							
12	April 27	8:00 p.m. EDT	@ Phillies	3–2	**Law** (3–0)	Meyer (0–1)	—	2:18	9,233	9–3	W6
13	April 28	8:00 p.m. EDT	@ Phillies	3–0	**Friend** (3–0)	Buzhardt (0–2)	—	2:24	8,789	10–3	W7
—	April 29		@ Reds	**Postponed (Rain)** (Makeup date: August 18)							
14	April 30	2:30 p.m. EDT	@ Reds	12–7	**Daniels** (1–0)	McLish (0–2)	**Face** (3)	2:44	3,481	11–3	W8

May: 16–11 (Home: 9–4; Away: 7–7)

#	Date	Time (ET)	Opponent	Score	Win	Loss	Save	Time of Game	Attendance	Record	Box/ Streak
15	May 1	2:30 p.m. EDT	@ Reds	13–2	**Law** (4–0)	Newcombe (1–1)	—	2:10	8,244	12–3	W9
16	May 2	9:00 p.m. EDT	@ Cardinals	3–4	Kline (1–0)	**Face** (0–2)	—	2:20	10,590	12–4	L1
17	May 4	2:30 p.m. EDT	@ Cubs	1–5	Ellsworth (1–0)	**Friend** (3–1)	—	2:07	4,631	12–5	L2
18	May 5	2:30 p.m. EDT	@ Cubs	9–7	**Green** (2–0)	Hobbie (2–3)	**Face** (4)	3:02	3,429	13–5	W1
19	May 6	11:15 p.m. EDT	@ Giants	1–5	Jones (3–2)	**Law** (4–1)	—	1:59	36,592	13–6	L1
20	May 7	4:00 p.m. EDT	@ Giants	5–6	Byerly (1–0)	**Green** (2–1)	—	2:32	33,066	13–7	L2
21	May 8	4:00 p.m. EDT	@ Giants	1–13	McCormick (4–0)	**Gibbon** (2–1)	—	2:38	40,173	13–8	L3
22	May 9	11:00 p.m. EDT	@ Dodgers	4–7	Sherry (4–3)	**Face** (0–3)	—	2:37	23,417	13–9	L4
23	May 10	11:00 p.m. EDT	@ Dodgers	3–2	**Law** (5–1)	Podres (2–2)	—	2:20	26,331	14–9	W1
24	May 11	11:00 p.m. EDT	@ Dodgers	6–3	**Face** (1–3)	Koufax (0–3)	—	2:43	27,926	15–9	W2
25	May 13	9:00 p.m. EDT	@ Braves	8–2	**Friend** (4–1)	Willey (2–2)	—	3:00	15,823	16–9	W3
26	May 14	2:30 p.m. EDT	@ Braves	6–4 (11)	**Face** (2–3)	McMahon (1–3)	—	2:45	16,865	17–9	W4
27	May 15 (1)	2:00 p.m. EDT	@ Braves	6–4	**Haddix** (2–1)	Spahn (2–1)	**Umbricht** (1)	2:36	—	18–9	W5
28	May 15 (2)	5:11 p.m. EDT	@ Braves	2–4	Pizarro (2–1)	**Daniels** (1–1)	McMahon (2)	2:32	29,757	18–10	L1
29	May 17	8:15 p.m. EDT	Cubs	11–6	**Friend** (5–1)	Hobbie (3–4)	**Face** (5)	2:35	16,102	19–10	W1
30	May 18	8:15 p.m. EDT	Cardinals	4–2	**Law** (6–1)	Kline (1–3)	—	2:12	14,615	20–10	W2
31	May 19	8:15 p.m. EDT	Cardinals	8–3	**Gibbon** (3–1)	Sadecki (0–1)	**Green** (1)	2:30	15,810	21–10	W3
32	May 20	8:15 p.m. EDT	Giants	5–4 (12)	**Green** (3–1)	O'Dell (1–4)	—	3:23	39,439	22–10	W4
33	May 21	1:30 p.m. EDT	Giants	1–3	Antonelli (3–0)	**Friend** (5–2)	Byerly (1)	2:05	28,984	22–11	L1
34	May 22	2:00 p.m. EDT	Giants	8–7 (11)	**Face** (3–3)	McCormick (5–2)	—	3:30	30,123	23–11	W1
35	May 23	8:15 p.m. EDT	Dodgers	0–1	Koufax (1–4)	**Daniels** (1–2)	—	2:19	16,936	23–12	L1
36	May 24	8:15 p.m. EDT	Dodgers	2–4	Podres (3–4)	**Gibbon** (3–2)	—	2:22	22,920	23–13	L2
37	May 25	8:15 p.m. EDT	Dodgers	1–5	Drysdale (4–4)	**Umbricht** (0–2)	—	2:13	23,975	23–14	L3
—	May 27		Phillies	**Postponed (Rain)** (Makeup date: August 16)							
38	May 28	1:30 p.m. EDT	Phillies	4–2 (13)	**Umbricht** (1–2)	Farrell (2–1)	—	3:14	9,476	24–14	W1
39	May 29	2:00 p.m. EDT	Phillies	8–5	**Law** (7–1)	Roberts (1–6)	**Green** (2)	2:15	15,704	25–14	W2
40	May 30	1:00 p.m. EDT	Braves	8–3	**Haddix** (3–1)	Spahn (2–2)	**Face** (6)	2:25	34,233	26–14	W3
—	May 30		Braves	**Postponed (Rain)** (Makeup date: July 14)							
41	May 31	8:15 p.m. EDT	Reds	4–3 (11)	**Face** (4–3)	McLish (2–4)	—	3:37	20,494	27–14	W4

June: 15–11 (Home: 6–4; Away: 9–7)

#	Date	Time (ET)	Opponent	Score	Win	Loss	Save	Time of Game	Attendance	Record	Box/ Streak
42	June 1	8:15 p.m. EDT	Reds	5–0	**Friend** (6–2)	Purkey (3–2)	—	1:55	26,791	28–14	W5
43	June 3	8:00 p.m. EDT	@ Phillies	3–0	**Law** (8–1)	Buzhardt (1–4)	—	2:13	16,738	29–14	W6
—	June 4		@ Phillies	**Postponed (Rain)** (Makeup date: September 20)							
44	June 5 (1)	1:00 p.m. EDT	@ Phillies	0–2	Conley (3–3)	**Friend** (6–3)	—	2:00	—	29–15	L1
45	June 5 (2)	3:35 p.m. EDT	@ Phillies	1–4	Owens (3–5)	**Haddix** (3–2)	—	2:06	23,410	29–16	L2
46	June 7	2:30 p.m. EDT	@ Cubs	2–13	Ellsworth (3–2)	**Law** (8–2)	Drabowsky (1)	2:35	8,736	29–17	L3
47	June 8	2:30 p.m. EDT	@ Cubs	5–3	**Mizell** (2–3)	Anderson (2–2)	**Face** (7)	2:50	9,118	30–17	W1
48	June 9	2:30 p.m. EDT	@ Cubs	11–3	**Friend** (7–3)	Hobbie (5–7)	**Green** (3)	2:30	7,442	31–17	W2
49	June 10	9:00 p.m. EDT	@ Cardinals	6–9	Jackson (8–5)	**Haddix** (3–3)	McDaniel (8)	2:50	19,532	31–18	L1
50	June 11	2:30 p.m. EDT	@ Cardinals	6–7	Duliba (4–2)	**Green** (3–2)	—	2:39	11,063	31–19	L2
51	June 12 (1)	2:00 p.m. EDT	@ Cardinals	15–3	**Law** (9–2)	Kline (2–6)	—	2:33	—	32–19	W1
52	June 12 (2)	5:08 p.m. EDT	@ Cardinals	2–5	Broglio (3–2)	**Mizell** (2–4)	McDaniel (9)	2:06	29,605	32–20	L1
53	June 14	11:15 p.m. EDT	@ Giants	6–3	**Friend** (8–3)	Jones (8–5)	—	2:30	35,465	33–20	W1
54	June 15	4:00 p.m. EDT	@ Giants	14–6	**Haddix** (4–3)	O'Dell (2–6)	—	3:15	19,180	34–20	W2
55	June 16	4:00 p.m. EDT	@ Giants	10–7	**Mizell** (3–4)	Sanford (6–3)	**Face** (8)	3:12	17,237	35–20	W3
56	June 17	11:00 p.m. EDT	@ Dodgers	2–1	**Law** (10–2)	Williams (5–1)	—	2:09	43,296	36–20	W4
57	June 18	11:00 p.m. EDT	@ Dodgers	4–3 (10)	**Face** (5–3)	Sherry (5–4)	—	2:36	50,062	37–20	W5
58	June 19	5:00 p.m. EDT	@ Dodgers	6–8	Roebuck (4–1)	**Daniels** (1–3)	Williams (1)	2:51	41,118	37–21	L1
59	June 21	8:15 p.m. EDT	Cardinals	3–2	**Law** (11–2)	Gibson (0–1)	**Face** (9)	2:23	21,292	38–21	W1
60	June 22	8:15 p.m. EDT	Cardinals	5–0	**Friend** (9–3)	Jackson (9–7)	—	2:30	21,320	39–21	W2
61	June 23	8:15 p.m. EDT	Cardinals	1–3	Kline (3–6)	**Haddix** (4–4)	McDaniel (12)	2:14	21,151	39–22	L1
62	June 24	8:15 p.m. EDT	Cubs	4–1	**Mizell** (4–4)	Ellsworth (3–5)	—	2:18	28,137	40–22	W1
63	June 25	1:30 p.m. EDT	Cubs	7–6	**Giel** (1–0)	Anderson (2–4)	**Face** (10)	2:51	20,428	41–22	W2
64	June 26 (1)	1:00 p.m. EDT	Cubs	6–7	Freeman (3–0)	**Friend** (9–4)	Elston (5)	2:58	—	41–23	L1
65	June 26 (2)	4:33 p.m. EDT	Cubs	5–7	Morehead (1–6)	**Law** (11–3)	Elston (6)	2:46	36,378	41–24	L2
66	June 28	8:15 p.m. EDT	Giants	7–7	—	—	—	3:19	30,621	41–24	T1
—	June 29		Giants	**Postponed (Rain)** (Makeup date: June 30)							
67	June 30 (1)	6:00 p.m. EDT	Giants	0–11	Sanford (7–5)	**Friend** (9–5)	—	2:13	—	41–25	L1
68	June 30 (2)	8:48 p.m. EDT	Giants	11–6	**Gibbon** (4–2)	Miller (2–3)	—	2:58	33,520	42–25	W1

July: 15–14 (Home: 3–5; Away: 12–9)

#	Date	Time (ET)	Opponent	Score	Win	Loss	Save	Time of Game	Attendance	Record	Box/ Streak
69	July 1	8:15 p.m. EDT	Dodgers	4–3 (10)	**Green** (4–2)	Sherry (6–5)	—	2:20	27,312	43–25	W2
70	July 2	1:30 p.m. EDT	Dodgers	1–6	Williams (7–2)	**Cheney** (0–1)	—	3:11	21,496	43–26	L1
71	July 3	2:00 p.m. EDT	Dodgers	2–6	Drysdale (5–10)	**Mizell** (4–5)	—	2:44	26,346	43–27	L2
72	July 4 (1)	2:30 p.m. EDT	@ Braves	6–7 (10)	Spahn (7–5)	**Face** (5–4)	—	2:05	—	43–28	L3
73	July 4 (2)	5:10 p.m. EDT	@ Braves	7–2	**Haddix** (5–4)	Jay (2–4)	—	2:57	38,478	44–28	W1
74	July 5	9:00 p.m. EDT	@ Braves	5–4 (10)	**Giel** (2–0)	Jay (2–5)	**Friend** (1)	3:14	24,479	45–28	W2
75	July 6	9:00 p.m. EDT	@ Reds	5–2	**Cheney** (1–1)	Purkey (8–4)	**Face** (11)	2:35	12,292	46–28	W3
76	July 7	9:00 p.m. EDT	@ Reds	3–2	**Mizell** (5–5)	Henry (1–4)	**Face** (12)	2:20	12,494	47–28	W4
77	July 8 (1)	6:00 p.m. EDT	@ Phillies	5–6 (10)	Farrell (7–2)	**Green** (4–3)	—	3:10	—	47–29	L1
78	July 8 (2)	9:45 p.m. EDT	@ Phillies	8–3	**Friend** (10–5)	Green (1–3)	—	2:33	36,056	48–29	W1
79	July 9	8:00 p.m. EDT	@ Phillies	1–2	Conley (6–4)	**Law** (11–4)	—	2:04	19,541	48–30	L1
80	July 10	1:35 p.m. EDT	@ Phillies	6–2	**Haddix** (6–4)	Roberts (5–8)	**Face** (13)	2:15	13,012	49–30	W1
ASG	July 11	3:00 p.m. EDT	28th All-Star Game in Kansas City, MO	5 – 3 AL	—	—	—	2:39	30,619	—	ASG
ASG	July 13	1:00 p.m. EDT	29th All-Star Game in Bronx, NY	6 – 0 AL	—	—	—	2:42	38,362	—	ASG
81	July 14	8:15 p.m. EDT	Braves	0–4	Buhl (9–3)	**Haddix** (6–5)	Burdette (4)	2:47	35,827	49–31	L1
82	July 15	8:15 p.m. EDT	Reds	1–4	O'Toole (7–8)	**Friend** (10–6)	Brosnan (4)	2:31	29,110	49–32	L2
83	July 16	1:30 p.m. EDT	Reds	6–5	**Francis** (1–0)	Brosnan (3–1)	—	2:18	19,674	50–32	W1
84	July 17 (1)	1:00 p.m. EDT	Reds	5–6	Purkey (9–5)	**Law** (11–5)	Brosnan (5)	2:33	—	50–33	L1
85	July 17 (2)	4:08 p.m. EDT	Reds	5–0	**Cheney** (2–1)	McLish (3–6)	—	2:20	36,290	51–33	W1
86	July 19	11:00 p.m. EDT	@ Dodgers	4–5	Sherry (7–7)	**Green** (4–4)	Roebuck (6)	2:21	51,438	51–34	L1
87	July 20	11:00 p.m. EDT	@ Dodgers	5–7 (11)	Craig (3–1)	**Face** (5–5)	—	3:31	51,301	51–35	L2
88	July 21	11:00 p.m. EDT	@ Dodgers	4–1	**Law** (12–5)	Podres (8–7)	—	2:12	51,193	52–35	W1
89	July 22	11:15 p.m. EDT	@ Giants	4–1	**Mizell** (6–5)	McCormick (9–6)	—	2:14	31,878	53–35	W2
90	July 23	4:00 p.m. EDT	@ Giants	1–3	Marichal (2–0)	**Haddix** (6–6)	—	1:59	30,228	53–36	L1
91	July 24	4:00 p.m. EDT	@ Giants	3–6	O'Dell (5–8)	**Cheney** (2–2)	McCormick (3)	2:30	36,447	53–37	L2
92	July 25	9:00 p.m. EDT	@ Cardinals	4–2	**Friend** (11–6)	Kline (3–8)	**Face** (14)	2:30	23,641	54–37	W1
93	July 26	9:00 p.m. EDT	@ Cardinals	5–4	**Law** (13–5)	Simmons (2–1)	**Face** (15)	2:29	20,899	55–37	W2
94	July 27	9:00 p.m. EDT	@ Cardinals	7–3	**Green** (5–4)	Sadecki (4–5)	—	2:58	17,236	56–37	W3
95	July 29	2:30 p.m. EDT	@ Cubs	4–0	**Mizell** (7–5)	Brewer (0–3)	—	2:02	9,673	57–37	W4
96	July 30	2:30 p.m. EDT	@ Cubs	1–6	Hobbie (10–13)	**Friend** (11–7)	—	2:11	13,365	57–38	L1
97	July 31	2:30 p.m. EDT	@ Cubs	2–6	Cardwell (5–10)	**Haddix** (6–7)	Elston (7)	2:21	18,297	57–39	L2

August: 21–10 (Home: 14–4; Away: 7–6)

#	Date	Time (ET)	Opponent	Score	Win	Loss	Save	Time of Game	Attendance	Record	Box/ Streak
98	August 2	8:15 p.m. EDT	Dodgers	3–0	**Law** (14–5)	Williams (11–3)	—	2:16	25,876	58–39	W1
99	August 3	8:15 p.m. EDT	Dodgers	1–3 (7)	Podres (9–8)	**Friend** (11–8)	—	1:51	24,819	58–40	L1
100	August 4	8:15 p.m. EDT	Dodgers	4–1	**Witt** (1–0)	Drysdale (10–11)	**Face** (16)	2:35	20,748	59–40	W1
101	August 5	8:15 p.m. EDT	Giants	1–0	**Mizell** (8–5)	Jones (13–11)	—	2:10	33,301	60–40	W2
102	August 6	1:30 p.m. EDT	Giants	8–7 (10)	**Law** (15–5)	Antonelli (4–7)	—	3:05	28,246	61–40	W3
103	August 7 (1)	1:00 p.m. EDT	Giants	4–1	**Friend** (12–8)	Sanford (9–10)	—	2:14	—	62–40	W4
104	August 7 (2)	3:49 p.m. EDT	Giants	7–5	**Face** (6–5)	Jones (0–1)	—	2:40	35,708	63–40	W5
105	August 9	8:15 p.m. EDT	Cubs	7–1	**Mizell** (9–5)	Drabowsky (2–1)	—	2:15	26,797	64–40	W6
106	August 10	8:15 p.m. EDT	Cubs	3–1	**Law** (16–5)	Cardwell (5–12)	—	2:00	20,074	65–40	W7
107	August 11	8:15 p.m. EDT	Cardinals	2–3 (12)	Broglio (14–5)	**Friend** (12–9)	—	2:57	34,212	65–41	L1
108	August 12	8:15 p.m. EDT	Cardinals	2–9	Gibson (3–3)	**Witt** (1–1)	—	2:54	35,439	65–42	L2
109	August 13	1:30 p.m. EDT	Cardinals	4–1	**Haddix** (7–7)	Sadecki (6–6)	—	2:16	24,620	66–42	W1
110	August 14 (1)	1:00 p.m. EDT	Cardinals	9–4	**Law** (17–5)	Jackson (13–10)	—	2:07	—	67–42	W2
111	August 14 (2)	3:42 p.m. EDT	Cardinals	3–2 (11)	**Green** (6–4)	McDaniel (10–4)	—	3:00	36,775	68–42	W3
112	August 15	8:15 p.m. EDT	Phillies	3–4	Mahaffey (1–0)	**Face** (6–6)	Short (1)	2:35	19,912	68–43	L1
113	August 16 (1)	6:00 p.m. EDT	Phillies	11–2	**Friend** (13–9)	Owens (3–11)	—	2:20	—	69–43	W1
114	August 16 (2)	8:55 p.m. EDT	Phillies	4–3	**Face** (7–6)	Roberts (8–11)	—	2:00	34,673	70–43	W2
115	August 17	8:15 p.m. EDT	Phillies	5–3	**Haddix** (8–7)	Buzhardt (4–11)	**Labine** (1)	2:26	33,598	71–43	W3
116	August 18	9:00 p.m. EDT	@ Reds	3–2	**Law** (18–5)	McLish (4–8)	**Face** (17)	1:49	11,668	72–43	W4
117	August 19	9:00 p.m. EDT	@ Reds	3–4	Purkey (13–7)	**Mizell** (9–6)	Brosnan (10)	2:21	16,347	72–44	L1
118	August 20	2:30 p.m. EDT	@ Reds	10–7	**Face** (8–6)	Maloney (1–4)	—	2:37	8,287	73–44	W1
119	August 21	2:30 p.m. EDT	@ Reds	4–8	Hook (10–13)	**Friend** (13–10)	Brosnan (11)	2:26	15,596	73–45	L1
120	August 23	2:30 p.m. EDT	@ Cubs	8–3	**Haddix** (9–7)	Ellsworth (6–10)	**Face** (18)	2:46	13,943	74–45	W1
121	August 24	2:30 p.m. EDT	@ Cubs	10–6	**Face** (9–6)	Elston (6–7)	—	3:03	15,268	75–45	W2
122	August 25	2:30 p.m. EDT	@ Cubs	1–2	Hobbie (13–16)	**Mizell** (9–7)	—	2:31	11,701	75–46	L1
123	August 26	9:00 p.m. EDT	@ Cardinals	1–3	Broglio (16–6)	**Friend** (13–11)	—	2:27	24,436	75–47	L2
124	August 27	9:00 p.m. EDT	@ Cardinals	4–5	Kline (4–8)	**Face** (9–7)	—	2:40	30,712	75–48	L3
125	August 28	2:30 p.m. EDT	@ Cardinals	4–5	Simmons (5–3)	**Haddix** (9–8)	McDaniel (21)	2:43	28,579	75–49	L4
126	August 29	11:00 p.m. EDT	@ Dodgers	10–2	**Law** (19–5)	Podres (11–10)	—	2:31	37,369	76–49	W1
127	August 30	11:00 p.m. EDT	@ Dodgers	5–2	**Friend** (14–11)	Koufax (6–11)	**Face** (19)	2:35	40,143	77–49	W2
128	August 31	4:00 p.m. EDT	@ Giants	7–4	**Labine** (1–0)	O'Dell (7–10)	**Face** (20)	2:37	16,202	78–49	W3

September: 15–10 (Home: 10–6; Away: 5–4)

#	Date	Time (ET)	Opponent	Score	Win	Loss	Save	Time of Game	Attendance	Record	Box/ Streak
129	September 1	4:00 p.m. EDT	@ Giants	6–1	**Haddix** (10–8)	Maranda (1–3)	**Labine** (2)	2:42	13,436	79–49	W4
130	September 3	1:30 p.m. EDT	Phillies	2–3	Mahaffey (5–0)	**Law** (19–6)	—	2:28	18,487	79–50	L1
131	September 4	1:00 p.m. EDT	Phillies	5–3	**Mizell** (10–7)	Owens (3–12)	**Labine** (3)	2:17	17,856	80–50	W1
132	September 5 (1)	1:00 p.m. EDT	Braves	9–7	**Green** (7–4)	Spahn (17–8)	**Face** (21)	2:47	—	81–50	W2
133	September 5 (2)	4:22 p.m. EDT	Braves	1–7	Buhl (14–8)	**Haddix** (10–9)	—	2:31	34,310	81–51	L1
134	September 6	8:15 p.m. EDT	Braves	5–3	**Labine** (2–0)	Spahn (17–9)	**Face** (22)	2:51	28,793	82–51	W1
135	September 7	8:15 p.m. EDT	Cardinals	1–2	Broglio (18–7)	**Law** (19–7)	McDaniel (23)	2:31	31,831	82–52	L1
136	September 9	8:15 p.m. EDT	Cubs	4–3	**Mizell** (11–7)	Ellsworth (6–12)	**Face** (23)	2:33	24,831	83–52	W1
137	September 10	1:30 p.m. EDT	Cubs	4–1	**Friend** (15–11)	Anderson (7–10)	—	1:59	19,701	84–52	W2
—	September 11		Cubs	**Postponed (Rain)** (Makeup date: September 22)							
—	September 11		Cubs	**Postponed (Rain)** (Makeup date: September 22)							
138	September 12	8:15 p.m. EDT	Giants	6–1	**Haddix** (11–9)	Sanford (12–12)	—	2:28	21,261	85–52	W3
139	September 13	8:15 p.m. EDT	Giants	3–6	McCormick (13–11)	**Mizell** (11–8)	—	2:51	21,313	85–53	L1
140	September 14	8:15 p.m. EDT	Dodgers	2–5	Williams (14–8)	**Law** (19–8)	—	2:35	28,547	85–54	L2
141	September 15	8:15 p.m. EDT	Dodgers	3–1	**Friend** (16–11)	Craig (7–3)	—	2:13	12,511	86–54	W1
142	September 16	9:00 p.m. EDT	@ Reds	3–4	O'Toole (12–11)	**Haddix** (11–10)	Brosnan (12)	2:20	9,352	86–55	L1
—	September 17		@ Reds	**Postponed (Rain)** (Makeup date: September 18)							
143	September 18 (1)	1:00 p.m. EDT	@ Reds	5–3	**Law** (20–8)	McLish (4–13)	—	2:11	—	87–55	W1
144	September 18 (2)	3:46 p.m. EDT	@ Reds	1–0	**Mizell** (12–8)	Purkey (17–9)	—	2:14	14,438	88–55	W2
145	September 20 (1)	6:00 p.m. EDT	@ Phillies	7–1	**Friend** (17–11)	Roberts (10–16)	—	2:15	—	89–55	W3
146	September 20 (2)	8:50 p.m. EDT	@ Phillies	3–2	**Labine** (3–0)	Owens (4–13)	—	2:26	17,216	90–55	W4
147	September 22 (1)	1:00 p.m. EDT	Cubs	3–2 (11)	**Face** (10–7)	Cardwell (8–15)	—	2:26	—	91–55	W5
148	September 22 (2)	4:01 p.m. EDT	Cubs	6–1	**Mizell** (13–8)	Anderson (8–11)	—	2:02	19,566	92–55	W6
149	September 23	9:00 p.m. EDT	@ Braves	1–2	Buhl (15–9)	**Witt** (1–2)	—	2:02	17,576	92–56	L1
150	September 24	2:30 p.m. EDT	@ Braves	2–4	Burdette (18–12)	**Friend** (17–12)	—	2:07	20,626	92–57	L2
151	September 25	2:30 p.m. EDT	@ Braves	2–4 (10)	Piché (3–5)	**Face** (10–8)	—	2:14	38,109	92–58	L3
152	September 27	8:15 p.m. EDT	Reds	4–3 (16)	**Green** (8–4)	McLish (4–14)	—	4:02	22,162	93–58	W1
153	September 30	8:15 p.m. EDT	Braves	2–13	Buhl (16–9)	**Law** (20–9)	—	2:45	25,148	93–59	L1

October: 2–0 (Home: 2–0; Away: 0–0)

#	Date	Time (ET)	Opponent	Score	Win	Loss	Save	Time of Game	Attendance	Record	Box/ Streak
154	October 1	1:30 p.m. EDT	Braves	7–3	**Friend** (18–12)	Spahn (21–10)	**Face** (24)	2:22	20,842	94–59	W1
155	October 2	2:00 p.m. EDT	Braves	9–5	**Mizell** (14–8)	Burdette (19–13)	**Haddix** (1)	2:25	34,578	95–59	W2

=== Detailed records ===
==== vs. Opponents ====
**National League**
Opponent	Home	Away	Total	Pct.	Runs scored	Runs allowed
Chicago Cubs	9–2	6–5	15–7	.682	114	90
Cincinnati Reds	8–3	8–3	16–6	.727	119	78
Los Angeles Dodgers	4–7	7–4	11–11	.500	76	76
Milwaukee Braves	8–3	5–6	13–9	.591	107	95
Philadelphia Phillies	8–3	7–4	15–7	.682	100	60
**Pittsburgh Pirates**	—	—	—	—	—	—
St. Louis Cardinals	7–4	4–7	11–11	.500	99	81
San Francisco Giants	8–3	6–5	14–8	.636	119	113
	**52–25**	**43–34**	**95–59**	**.617**	**754**	**593**

==== Month-by-Month ====
Month	Games	Won	Lost	Win %	RS	RA
April	14	11	3	0.786	84	49
May	27	16	11	0.593	132	116
June	26	15	11	0.577	147	127
July	29	15	14	0.517	114	108
August	31	21	10	0.677	151	103
September	25	15	10	0.600	90	82
October	2	2	0	1.000	16	8
Total	155	95	59	0.617	754	593

	Games	Won	Lost	Win %	RS	RA
Home	78	52	25	0.675	362	287
Road	77	43	34	0.558	372	306
Total	155	95	59	0.617	754	593

=== Composite Box ===
1960 Pittsburgh Pirates Inning–by–Inning Boxscore
Team	1	2	3	4	5	6	7	8	9	10	11	12	13	14	15	16	R	H	E
Opponents	79	47	61	66	69	62	85	58	52	9	2	3	0	0	0	0	593	1363	147
Pirates	96	82	71	82	82	62	90	71	71	8	6	3	2	0	0	1	734	1493	128

=== Postseason Game log ===
Legend
	Pirates win
	Pirates loss
**Bold**	Pirates team member

1960 Postseason game log: 4–3 (Home: 2–2; Away: 2–1)
World Series: vs. New York Yankees 4–3 (Home: 2–2; Away: 2–1)

#	Date	Time (ET)	Opponent	Score	Win	Loss	Save	Time of Game	Attendance	Series	Box/ Streak
1	October 5	1:00 p.m. EDT	Yankees	6–4	**Law** (1–0)	Ditmar (0–1)	**Face** (1)	2:29	36,676	PIT 1–0	W1
2	October 6	1:00 p.m. EDT	Yankees	3–16	Turley (1–0)	**Friend** (0–1)	—	3:14	37,308	TIE 1–1	L1
3	October 8	1:00 p.m. EDT	@ Yankees	0–10	Ford (1–0)	**Mizell** (0–1)	—	2:41	70,001	NYA 2–1	L2
4	October 9	2:00 p.m. EDT	@ Yankees	3–2	**Law** (2–0)	Terry (0–1)	**Face** (2)	2:29	67,812	TIE 2–2	W1
5	October 10	1:00 p.m. EDT	@ Yankees	5–2	**Haddix** (1–0)	Ditmar (0–2)	**Face** (3)	2:32	62,753	PIT 3–2	W2
6	October 12	1:00 p.m. EDT	Yankees	0–12	Ford (2–0)	**Friend** (0–2)	—	2:38	38,580	TIE 3–3	L1
7	October 13	1:00 p.m. EDT	Yankees	10–9	**Haddix** (2–0)	Terry (0–2)	—	2:36	36,683	PIT 4–3	W1

== Postseason ==
=== 1960 World Series ===
The 1960 Pirates team, which featured eight All-Stars, was widely predicted to lose the World Series to a powerful New York Yankees team. In the World Series, the Pirates were defeated by more than ten runs in three games, won three close games, then recovered from a 7–4 deficit late in Game 7 to eventually win on a walk-off home run by Bill Mazeroski.

=== Game 1 ===
October 5, 1960, at Forbes Field in Pittsburgh, Pennsylvania. Attendance: 36,676

Team	1	2	3	4	5	6	7	8	9	R	H	E
New York (A)	1	0	0	1	0	0	0	0	2	4	13	2
Pittsburgh (N)	3	0	0	2	0	1	0	0	X	6	8	0
W: Vern Law (1–0) L: Art Ditmar (0–1), S: Roy Face (1)
HR: NYY – Roger Maris (1), Elston Howard (1) PIT – Bill Mazeroski (1)

=== Game 2 ===
October 6, 1960, at Forbes Field in Pittsburgh, Pennsylvania. Attendance: 37,308

Team	1	2	3	4	5	6	7	8	9	R	H	E
New York (A)	0	0	2	1	2	7	3	0	1	16	19	1
Pittsburgh (N)	0	0	0	1	0	0	0	0	2	3	13	1
W: Bob Turley (1–0) L: Bob Friend (0–1)
HR: NYY – Mickey Mantle 2 (2)

=== Game 3 ===
October 8, 1960, at Yankee Stadium in New York City. Attendance: 70,001

Team	1	2	3	4	5	6	7	8	9	R	H	E
Pittsburgh (N)	0	0	0	0	0	0	0	0	0	0	4	0
New York (A)	6	0	0	4	0	0	0	0	x	10	16	1
W: Whitey Ford (1–0) L: Vinegar Bend Mizell (0–1)
HR: NYY – Bobby Richardson (1), Mickey Mantle (3)

=== Game 4 ===
October 9, 1960, at Yankee Stadium in New York City. Attendance: 67,812

Team	1	2	3	4	5	6	7	8	9	R	H	E
Pittsburgh (N)	0	0	0	0	3	0	0	0	0	3	7	0
New York (A)	0	0	0	1	0	0	1	0	0	2	8	0
W: Vern Law (2–0) L: Ralph Terry (0–1), S: Roy Face (2)
HR: NYY – Bill Skowron (1)

=== Game 5 ===
October 10, 1960, at Yankee Stadium in New York City. Attendance: 62,753

Team	1	2	3	4	5	6	7	8	9	R	H	E
Pittsburgh (N)	0	3	1	0	0	0	0	0	1	5	10	2
New York (A)	0	1	1	0	0	0	0	0	0	2	5	2
W: Harvey Haddix (1–0) L: Art Ditmar (0–2), S: Roy Face (3)
HR: NYY – Roger Maris (2)

=== Game 6 ===
October 12, 1960, at Forbes Field in Pittsburgh, Pennsylvania. Attendance: 38,580

Team	1	2	3	4	5	6	7	8	9	R	H	E
New York (A)	0	1	5	0	0	2	2	2	0	12	17	1
Pittsburgh (N)	0	0	0	0	0	0	0	0	0	0	7	1
W: Whitey Ford (2–0) L: Bob Friend (0–2)

=== Game 7 ===
October 13, 1960, at Forbes Field in Pittsburgh, Pennsylvania. Attendance: 36,683

Team	1	2	3	4	5	6	7	8	9	R	H	E
New York (A)	0	0	0	0	1	4	0	2	2	9	13	1
Pittsburgh (N)	2	2	0	0	0	0	0	5	1	10	11	0
W: Harvey Haddix (2–0) L: Ralph Terry (0–2)
HR: NYY – Bill Skowron (2), Yogi Berra (1) PIT – Rocky Nelson (1), Hal Smith (1), Bill Mazeroski (2)

=== Composite Box ===
1960 World Series (4–3): Pittsburgh Pirates (N.L.) over New York Yankees (A.L.)

Team	1	2	3	4	5	6	7	8	9	R	H	E
Pittsburgh Pirates	5	5	1	3	3	1	0	5	4	27	60	4
New York Yankees	7	2	8	7	3	13	6	4	5	55	91	8
Total Attendance: 349,813 Average Attendance: 49,973
Winning Player's Share: – $8,418 Losing Player's Share – $5,125

== Starting Lineups ==
=== Regular Season ===
==== Batting Order ====
1960 Regular Season Batting Order game log
April

#	Date	Opponent	1st	2nd	3rd	4th	5th	6th	7th	8th	9th
1	April 12	@ MIL	#4; Skinner (LF)	#24; Groat (SS)	#21; Clemente (RF)	#7; Stuart (1B)	#12; Hoak (3B)	#20; Cimoli (CF)	#9; Mazeroski (2B)	#5; Smith (C)	#19; Friend (SP)
9	April 22	MIL	#4; Skinner (LF)	#24; Groat (SS)	#21; Clemente (RF)	#7; Stuart (1B)	#12; Hoak (3B)	#5; Smith (C)	#20; Cimoli (CF)	#9; Mazeroski (2B)	#19; Friend (SP)
10	April 23	MIL	#12; Hoak (3B)	#24; Groat (SS)	#4; Skinner (LF)	#7; Stuart (1B)	#21; Clemente (RF)	#6; Burgess (C)	#18; Virdon (CF)	#9; Mazeroski (2B)	#29; Daniels (SP)
11	April 24	MIL	#12; Hoak (3B)	#24; Groat (SS)	#4; Skinner (LF)	#7; Stuart (1B)	#21; Clemente (RF)	#6; Burgess (C)	#18; Virdon (CF)	#9; Mazeroski (2B)	#31; Haddix (SP)

May

#	Date	Opponent	1st	2nd	3rd	4th	5th	6th	7th	8th	9th
16	May 2	@ STL	#12; Hoak (3B)	#24; Groat (SS)	#4; Skinner (LF)	#7; Stuart (1B)	#21; Clemente (RF)	#6; Burgess (C)	#18; Virdon (CF)	#9; Mazeroski (2B)	#31; Haddix (SP)
19	May 6	@ SF	#12; Hoak (3B)	#24; Groat (SS)	#4; Skinner (LF)	#14; Nelson (1B)	#21; Clemente (RF)	#6; Burgess (C)	#18; Virdon (LF)	#9; Mazeroski (2B)	#32; Law (SP)
20	May 7	@ SF	#12; Hoak (3B)	#24; Groat (SS)	#4; Skinner (LF)	#14; Nelson (1B)	#21; Clemente (RF)	#6; Burgess (C)	#18; Virdon (LF)	#9; Mazeroski (2B)	#31; Haddix (SP)
21	May 8	@ SF	#4; Skinner (LF)	#24; Groat (SS)	#21; Clemente (RF)	#7; Stuart (1B)	#12; Hoak (3B)	#5; Smith (C)	#20; Cimoli (CF)	#9; Mazeroski (2B)	#22; Gibbon (SP)
22	May 9	@ LA	#16; Baker (3B)	#24; Groat (SS)	#4; Skinner (LF)	#7; Stuart (1B)	#21; Clemente (RF)	#5; Smith (C)	#20; Cimoli (CF)	#9; Mazeroski (2B)	#19; Friend (SP)
23	May 10	@ LA	#4; Skinner (LF)	#24; Groat (SS)	#21; Clemente (RF)	#7; Stuart (1B)	#16; Baker (3B)	#5; Smith (C)	#20; Cimoli (CF)	#9; Mazeroski (2B)	#32; Law (SP)
24	May 11	@ LA	#4; Skinner (LF)	#24; Groat (SS)	#21; Clemente (RF)	#7; Stuart (1B)	#16; Baker (3B)	#5; Smith (C)	#20; Cimoli (CF)	#9; Mazeroski (2B)	#22; Gibbon (SP)
25	May 13	@ MIL	#12; Hoak (3B)	#24; Groat (SS)	#4; Skinner (LF)	#7; Stuart (1B)	#21; Clemente (RF)	#5; Smith (C)	#20; Cimoli (CF)	#9; Mazeroski (2B)	#19; Friend (SP)
26	May 14	@ MIL	#12; Hoak (3B)	#24; Groat (SS)	#4; Skinner (LF)	#7; Stuart (1B)	#21; Clemente (RF)	#6; Burgess (C)	#20; Cimoli (CF)	#11; Schofield (2B)	#32; Law (SP)
27	May 15	@ MIL	#4; Skinner (LF)	#24; Groat (SS)	#21; Clemente (RF)	#7; Stuart (1B)	#12; Hoak (3B)	#6; Burgess (C)	#20; Cimoli (CF)	#11; Schofield (2B)	#31; Haddix (SP)
28	May 15	@ MIL	#4; Skinner (LF)	#24; Groat (SS)	#21; Clemente (RF)	#7; Stuart (1B)	#12; Hoak (3B)	#5; Smith (C)	#20; Cimoli (CF)	#11; Schofield (2B)	#29; Daniels (SP)
30	May 18	STL	#12; Hoak (3B)	#24; Groat (SS)	#4; Skinner (LF)	#7; Stuart (1B)	#21; Clemente (RF)	#6; Burgess (C)	#20; Cimoli (CF)	#9; Mazeroski (2B)	#32; Law (SP)
31	May 19	STL	#4; Skinner (LF)	#24; Groat (SS)	#21; Clemente (RF)	#7; Stuart (1B)	#12; Hoak (3B)	#5; Smith (C)	#20; Cimoli (CF)	#9; Mazeroski (2B)	#22; Gibbon (SP)
32	May 20	SF	#12; Hoak (3B)	#24; Groat (SS)	#4; Skinner (LF)	#7; Stuart (1B)	#21; Clemente (RF)	#6; Burgess (C)	#18; Virdon (CF)	#9; Mazeroski (2B)	#31; Haddix (SP)
33	May 21	SF	#4; Skinner (LF)	#24; Groat (SS)	#21; Clemente (RF)	#7; Stuart (1B)	#12; Hoak (3B)	#5; Smith (C)	#20; Cimoli (CF)	#9; Mazeroski (2B)	#19; Friend (SP)
34	May 22	SF	#12; Hoak (3B)	#24; Groat (SS)	#4; Skinner (LF)	#7; Stuart (1B)	#21; Clemente (RF)	#6; Burgess (C)	#18; Virdon (CF)	#9; Mazeroski (2B)	#32; Law (SP)
35	May 23	LA	#4; Skinner (LF)	#24; Groat (SS)	#21; Clemente (RF)	#7; Stuart (1B)	#12; Hoak (3B)	#5; Smith (C)	#20; Cimoli (CF)	#9; Mazeroski (2B)	#29; Daniels (SP)
36	May 24	LA	#4; Skinner (LF)	#24; Groat (SS)	#21; Clemente (RF)	#7; Stuart (1B)	#12; Hoak (3B)	#5; Smith (C)	#20; Cimoli (CF)	#9; Mazeroski (2B)	#22; Gibbon (SP)
37	May 25	LA	#12; Hoak (3B)	#24; Groat (SS)	#4; Skinner (LF)	#14; Nelson (1B)	#21; Clemente (RF)	#6; Burgess (C)	#18; Virdon (CF)	#9; Mazeroski (2B)	#37; Umbricht (SP)
40	May 30	MIL	#4; Skinner (LF)	#24; Groat (SS)	#21; Clemente (RF)	#7; Stuart (1B)	#12; Hoak (3B)	#6; Burgess (C)	#20; Cimoli (CF)	#9; Mazeroski (2B)	#31; Haddix (SP)

June

#	Date	Opponent	1st	2nd	3rd	4th	5th	6th	7th	8th	9th
49	June 10	@ STL	#18; Virdon (CF)	#24; Groat (SS)	#4; Skinner (LF)	#7; Stuart (1B)	#21; Clemente (RF)	#6; Burgess (C)	#12; Hoak (3B)	#9; Mazeroski (2B)	#31; Haddix (SP)
50	June 11	@ STL	#4; Skinner (LF)	#24; Groat (SS)	#21; Clemente (RF)	#7; Stuart (1B)	#20; Cimoli (CF)	#5; Smith (C)	#12; Hoak (3B)	#9; Mazeroski (2B)	#22; Gibbon (SP)
51	June 12	@ STL	#18; Virdon (CF)	#24; Groat (SS)	#4; Skinner (LF)	#7; Stuart (1B)	#21; Clemente (RF)	#6; Burgess (C)	#12; Hoak (3B)	#9; Mazeroski (2B)	#32; Law (SP)
52	June 12	@ STL	#18; Virdon (CF)	#24; Groat (SS)	#4; Skinner (LF)	#7; Stuart (1B)	#20; Cimoli (RF)	#5; Smith (C)	#12; Hoak (3B)	#9; Mazeroski (2B)	#30; Mizell (SP)
53	June 14	@ SF									
54	June 15	@ SF									
55	June 16	@ SF									
56	June 17	@ LA	#18; Virdon (CF)	#24; Groat (SS)	#4; Skinner (LF)	#7; Stuart (1B)	#21; Clemente (RF)	#6; Burgess (C)	#12; Hoak (3B)	#9; Mazeroski (2B)	#32; Law (SP)
57	June 18	@ LA	#4; Skinner (LF)	#24; Groat (SS)	#21; Clemente (RF)	#7; Stuart (1B)	#20; Cimoli (CF)	#5; Smith (C)	#12; Hoak (3B)	#9; Mazeroski (2B)	#19; Friend (SP)
58	June 19	@ LA	#4; Skinner (LF)	#24; Groat (SS)	#21; Clemente (RF)	#7; Stuart (1B)	#20; Cimoli (CF)	#5; Smith (C)	#12; Hoak (3B)	#9; Mazeroski (2B)	#29; Daniels (SP)
59	June 21	STL	#18; Virdon (CF)	#24; Groat (SS)	#4; Skinner (LF)	#7; Stuart (1B)	#21; Clemente (RF)	#6; Burgess (C)	#12; Hoak (3B)	#9; Mazeroski (2B)	#32; Law (SP)
60	June 22	STL	#18; Virdon (CF)	#24; Groat (SS)	#4; Skinner (LF)	#14; Nelson (1B)	#21; Clemente (RF)	#5; Smith (C)	#12; Hoak (3B)	#9; Mazeroski (2B)	#19; Friend (SP)
61	June 23	STL	#18; Virdon (CF)	#24; Groat (SS)	#4; Skinner (LF)	#7; Stuart (1B)	#21; Clemente (RF)	#6; Burgess (C)	#12; Hoak (3B)	#9; Mazeroski (2B)	#31; Haddix (SP)
66	June 28	SF									
67	June 30	SF									
68	June 30	SF									

July

#	Date	Opponent	1st	2nd	3rd	4th	5th	6th	7th	8th	9th
69	July 1	LA	#23; Christopher (LF)	#24; Groat (SS)	#21; Clemente (RF)	#7; Stuart (1B)	#20; Cimoli (CF)	#5; Smith (C)	#12; Hoak (3B)	#9; Mazeroski (2B)	#32; Law (SP)
70	July 2	LA	#18; Virdon (CF)	#24; Groat (SS)	#4; Skinner (LF)	#7; Stuart (1B)	#21; Clemente (RF)	#6; Burgess (C)	#12; Hoak (3B)	#9; Mazeroski (2B)	#48; Cheney (SP)
71	July 3	LA	#18; Virdon (CF)	#24; Groat (SS)	#4; Skinner (LF)	#7; Stuart (1B)	#21; Clemente (RF)	#6; Burgess (C)	#12; Hoak (3B)	#9; Mazeroski (2B)	#30; Mizell (SP)
72	July 4	@ MIL	#18; Virdon (CF)	#24; Groat (SS)	#4; Skinner (LF)	#7; Stuart (1B)	#21; Clemente (RF)	#6; Burgess (C)	#12; Hoak (3B)	#9; Mazeroski (2B)	#19; Friend (SP)
73	July 4	@ MIL	#18; Virdon (CF)	#24; Groat (SS)	#4; Skinner (LF)	#14; Nelson (1B)	#20; Cimoli (RF)	#5; Smith (C)	#12; Hoak (3B)	#11; Schofield (2B)	#31; Haddix (SP)
74	July 5	@ MIL	#18; Virdon (CF)	#24; Groat (SS)	#4; Skinner (LF)	#14; Nelson (1B)	#20; Cimoli (RF)	#5; Smith (C)	#12; Hoak (3B)	#9; Mazeroski (2B)	#32; Law (SP)
81	July 14	MIL	#20; Cimoli (CF)	#24; Groat (SS)	#4; Skinner (LF)	#7; Stuart (1B)	#21; Clemente (RF)	#6; Burgess (C)	#12; Hoak (3B)	#9; Mazeroski (2B)	#31; Haddix (SP)
86	July 19	@ LA	#18; Virdon (CF)	#24; Groat (SS)	#4; Skinner (LF)	#7; Stuart (1B)	#21; Clemente (RF)	#5; Smith (C)	#12; Hoak (3B)	#9; Mazeroski (2B)	#19; Friend (SP)
87	July 20	@ LA	#18; Virdon (CF)	#24; Groat (SS)	#4; Skinner (LF)	#7; Stuart (1B)	#21; Clemente (RF)	#5; Smith (C)	#12; Hoak (3B)	#9; Mazeroski (2B)	#39; Witt (SP)
88	July 21	@ LA	#23; Christopher (LF)	#24; Groat (SS)	#21; Clemente (RF)	#7; Stuart (1B)	#20; Cimoli (CF)	#5; Smith (C)	#12; Hoak (3B)	#9; Mazeroski (2B)	#32; Law (SP)
89	July 22	@ SF									
90	July 23	@ SF									
91	July 24	@ SF									
92	July 25	@ STL	#18; Virdon (CF)	#24; Groat (SS)	#4; Skinner (LF)	#14; Nelson (1B)	#21; Clemente (RF)	#6; Burgess (C)	#12; Hoak (3B)	#9; Mazeroski (2B)	#19; Friend (SP)
93	July 26	@ STL	#23; Christopher (LF)	#24; Groat (SS)	#21; Clemente (RF)	#7; Stuart (1B)	#20; Cimoli (CF)	#6; Burgess (C)	#12; Hoak (3B)	#9; Mazeroski (2B)	#32; Law (SP)
94	July 27	@ STL	#23; Christopher (LF)	#24; Groat (SS)	#21; Clemente (RF)	#7; Stuart (1B)	#20; Cimoli (CF)	#5; Smith (C)	#12; Hoak (3B)	#9; Mazeroski (2B)	#39; Witt (SP)

August

#	Date	Opponent	1st	2nd	3rd	4th	5th	6th	7th	8th	9th
98	August 2	LA	#18; Virdon (CF)	#24; Groat (SS)	#4; Skinner (LF)	#14; Nelson (1B)	#21; Clemente (RF)	#6; Burgess (C)	#12; Hoak (3B)	#9; Mazeroski (2B)	#32; Law (SP)
99	August 3	LA	#4; Skinner (LF)	#24; Groat (SS)	#21; Clemente (RF)	#7; Stuart (1B)	#20; Cimoli (CF)	#5; Smith (C)	#12; Hoak (3B)	#9; Mazeroski (2B)	#19; Friend (SP)
100	August 4	LA	#18; Virdon (CF)	#24; Groat (SS)	#4; Skinner (LF)	#14; Nelson (1B)	#21; Clemente (RF)	#6; Burgess (C)	#12; Hoak (3B)	#9; Mazeroski (2B)	#39; Witt (SP)
101	August 5	SF									
102	August 6	SF									
103	August 7	SF									
104	August 7	SF									
107	August 11	STL	#18; Virdon (CF)	#24; Groat (SS)	#4; Skinner (LF)	#14; Nelson (1B)	#20; Cimoli (RF)	#6; Burgess (C)	#12; Hoak (3B)	#9; Mazeroski (2B)	#19; Friend (SP)
108	August 12	STL	#18; Virdon (CF)	#24; Groat (SS)	#4; Skinner (LF)	#14; Nelson (1B)	#21; Clemente (RF)	#6; Burgess (C)	#12; Hoak (3B)	#9; Mazeroski (2B)	#39; Witt (SP)
109	August 13	STL	#18; Virdon (CF)	#24; Groat (SS)	#21; Clemente (RF)	#7; Stuart (1B)	#20; Cimoli (LF)	#5; Smith (C)	#12; Hoak (3B)	#9; Mazeroski (2B)	#31; Haddix (SP)
110	August 14	STL	#18; Virdon (CF)	#24; Groat (SS)	#4; Skinner (LF)	#14; Nelson (1B)	#21; Clemente (RF)	#5; Smith (C)	#12; Hoak (3B)	#9; Mazeroski (2B)	#32; Law (SP)
111	August 14	STL	#18; Virdon (CF)	#24; Groat (SS)	#20; Cimoli (RF)	#7; Stuart (1B)	#23; Christopher (LF)	#6; Burgess (C)	#12; Hoak (3B)	#9; Mazeroski (2B)	#48; Cheney (SP)
123	August 26	@ STL	#18; Virdon (CF)	#24; Groat (SS)	#20; Cimoli (LF)	#7; Stuart (1B)	#21; Clemente (RF)	#6; Burgess (C)	#12; Hoak (3B)	#9; Mazeroski (2B)	#19; Friend (SP)
124	August 27	@ STL	#18; Virdon (CF)	#24; Groat (SS)	#4; Skinner (LF)	#14; Nelson (1B)	#21; Clemente (RF)	#6; Burgess (C)	#12; Hoak (3B)	#9; Mazeroski (2B)	#48; Cheney (SP)
125	August 28	@ STL	#18; Virdon (CF)	#24; Groat (SS)	#21; Clemente (RF)	#7; Stuart (1B)	#20; Cimoli (LF)	#5; Smith (C)	#12; Hoak (3B)	#9; Mazeroski (2B)	#31; Haddix (SP)
126	August 29	@ LA	#4; Skinner (LF)	#24; Groat (SS)	#21; Clemente (RF)	#7; Stuart (1B)	#20; Cimoli (CF)	#5; Smith (C)	#12; Hoak (3B)	#9; Mazeroski (2B)	#32; Law (SP)
127	August 30	@ LA	#4; Skinner (LF)	#24; Groat (SS)	#21; Clemente (RF)	#7; Stuart (1B)	#20; Cimoli (CF)	#5; Smith (C)	#12; Hoak (3B)	#9; Mazeroski (2B)	#19; Friend (SP)
128	August 31	@ SF									

September

#	Date	Opponent	1st	2nd	3rd	4th	5th	6th	7th	8th	9th
129	September 1	@ SF									
132	September 5	MIL	#18; Virdon (CF)	#24; Groat (SS)	#21; Clemente (RF)	#7; Stuart (1B)	#20; Cimoli (LF)	#5; Smith (C)	#12; Hoak (3B)	#9; Mazeroski (2B)	#19; Friend (SP)
133	September 5	MIL	#18; Virdon (CF)	#24; Groat (SS)	#4; Skinner (LF)	#7; Stuart (1B)	#21; Clemente (RF)	#6; Burgess (C)	#12; Hoak (3B)	#9; Mazeroski (2B)	#31; Haddix (SP)
134	September 6	MIL	#18; Virdon (CF)	#24; Groat (SS)	#4; Skinner (LF)	#7; Stuart (1B)	#21; Clemente (RF)	#6; Burgess (C)	#12; Hoak (3B)	#9; Mazeroski (2B)	#22; Gibbon (SP)
135	September 7	STL	#18; Virdon (CF)	#11; Schofield (SS)	#4; Skinner (LF)	#7; Stuart (1B)	#21; Clemente (RF)	#6; Burgess (C)	#12; Hoak (3B)	#9; Mazeroski (2B)	#32; Law (SP)
138	September 12	SF									
139	September 13	SF									
140	September 14	LA	#20; Cimoli (CF)	#4; Skinner (LF)	#21; Clemente (RF)	#7; Stuart (1B)	#6; Burgess (C)	#12; Hoak (3B)	#9; Mazeroski (2B)	#11; Schofield (SS)	#32; Law (SP)
141	September 15	LA	#20; Cimoli (CF)	#4; Skinner (LF)	#21; Clemente (RF)	#7; Stuart (1B)	#6; Burgess (C)	#12; Hoak (3B)	#9; Mazeroski (2B)	#11; Schofield (SS)	#19; Friend (SP)
149	September 23	@ MIL	#18; Virdon (CF)	#4; Skinner (LF)	#21; Clemente (RF)	#7; Stuart (1B)	#6; Burgess (C)	#12; Hoak (3B)	#9; Mazeroski (2B)	#11; Schofield (SS)	#39; Witt (SP)
150	September 24	@ MIL	#18; Virdon (CF)	#4; Skinner (LF)	#21; Clemente (RF)	#7; Stuart (1B)	#6; Burgess (C)	#12; Hoak (3B)	#9; Mazeroski (2B)	#11; Schofield (SS)	#19; Friend (SP)
151	September 25	@ MIL	#20; Cimoli (CF)	#4; Skinner (LF)	#21; Clemente (RF)	#7; Stuart (1B)	#5; Smith (C)	#12; Hoak (3B)	#9; Mazeroski (2B)	#11; Schofield (SS)	#31; Haddix (SP)
153	September 30	MIL	#18; Virdon (CF)	#4; Skinner (LF)	#21; Clemente (RF)	#14; Nelson (1B)	#6; Burgess (C)	#12; Hoak (3B)	#9; Mazeroski (2B)	#11; Schofield (SS)	#32; Law (SP)

October

#	Date	Opponent	1st	2nd	3rd	4th	5th	6th	7th	8th	9th
154	October 1	MIL	#18; Virdon (CF)	#24; Groat (SS)	#21; Clemente (RF)	#7; Stuart (1B)	#20; Cimoli (LF)	#5; Smith (C)	#12; Hoak (3B)	#9; Mazeroski (2B)	#19; Friend (SP)
155	October 2	MIL	#23; Christopher (CF)	#24; Groat (SS)	#4; Skinner (LF)	#14; Nelson (1B)	#21; Clemente (RF)	#6; Burgess (C)	#12; Hoak (3B)	#11; Schofield; 2B)	#31; Haddix (SP)

==== Defensive Lineup ====
1960 Regular Season Defensive Lineup game log
April

#	Date	Opponent	C	1B	2B	3B	SS	LF	CF	RF	P
1	April 12	@ MIL	#5; Smith	#7; Stuart	#9; Mazeroski	#12; Hoak	#24; Groat	#4; Skinner	#20; Cimoli	#21; Clemente	#19; Friend
9	April 22	MIL	#5; Smith	#7; Stuart	#9; Mazeroski	#12; Hoak	#24; Groat	#4; Skinner	#20; Cimoli	#21; Clemente	#19; Friend
10	April 23	MIL	#6; Burgess	#7; Stuart	#9; Mazeroski	#12; Hoak	#24; Groat	#4; Skinner	#18; Virdon	#21; Clemente	#29; Daniels
11	April 24	MIL	#6; Burgess	#7; Stuart	#9; Mazeroski	#12; Hoak	#24; Groat	#4; Skinner	#18; Virdon	#21; Clemente	#31; Haddix

May

#	Date	Opponent	C	1B	2B	3B	SS	LF	CF	RF	P
16	May 2	@ STL	#6; Burgess	#7; Stuart	#9; Mazeroski	#12; Hoak	#24; Groat	#4; Skinner	#18; Virdon	#21; Clemente	#31; Haddix
19	May 6	@ SF	#6; Burgess	#14; Nelson	#9; Mazeroski	#12; Hoak	#24; Groat	#4; Skinner	#18; Virdon	#21; Clemente	#32; Law
20	May 7	@ SF	#6; Burgess	#14; Nelson	#9; Mazeroski	#12; Hoak	#24; Groat	#4; Skinner	#18; Virdon	#21; Clemente	#31; Haddix
21	May 8	@ SF	#5; Smith	#14; Nelson	#9; Mazeroski	#12; Hoak	#24; Groat	#4; Skinner	#18; Virdon	#21; Clemente	#22; Gibbon
22	May 9	@ LA	#5; Smith	#7; Stuart	#9; Mazeroski	#16; Baker	#24; Groat	#4; Skinner	#20; Cimoli	#21; Clemente	#19; Friend
23	May 10	@ LA	#5; Smith	#7; Stuart	#9; Mazeroski	#16; Baker	#24; Groat	#4; Skinner	#20; Cimoli	#21; Clemente	#32; Law
24	May 11	@ LA	#5; Smith	#7; Stuart	#9; Mazeroski	#16; Baker	#24; Groat	#4; Skinner	#20; Cimoli	#21; Clemente	#22; Gibbon
25	May 13	@ MIL	#5; Smith	#7; Stuart	#9; Mazeroski	#12; Hoak	#24; Groat	#4; Skinner	#20; Cimoli	#21; Clemente	#19; Friend
26	May 14	@ MIL	#6; Burgess	#7; Stuart	#11; Schofield	#12; Hoak	#24; Groat	#4; Skinner	#20; Cimoli	#21; Clemente	#32; Law
27	May 15	@ MIL	#6; Burgess	#7; Stuart	#11; Schofield	#12; Hoak	#24; Groat	#4; Skinner	#20; Cimoli	#21; Clemente	#31; Haddix
28	May 15	@ MIL	#5; Smith	#7; Stuart	#11; Schofield	#12; Hoak	#24; Groat	#4; Skinner	#20; Cimoli	#21; Clemente	#29; Daniels
30	May 18	STL	#6; Burgess	#7; Stuart	#9; Mazeroski	#12; Hoak	#24; Groat	#4; Skinner	#20; Cimoli	#21; Clemente	#32; Law
31	May 19	STL	#5; Smith	#7; Stuart	#9; Mazeroski	#12; Hoak	#24; Groat	#4; Skinner	#20; Cimoli	#21; Clemente	#22; Gibbon
32	May 20	SF	#6; Burgess	#7; Stuart	#9; Mazeroski	#12; Hoak	#24; Groat	#4; Skinner	#18; Virdon	#21; Clemente	#31; Haddix
33	May 21	SF	#5; Smith	#7; Stuart	#9; Mazeroski	#12; Hoak	#24; Groat	#4; Skinner	#20; Cimoli	#21; Clemente	#19; Friend
34	May 22	SF	#6; Burgess	#7; Stuart	#9; Mazeroski	#12; Hoak	#24; Groat	#4; Skinner	#18; Virdon	#21; Clemente	#32; Law
35	May 23	LA	#5; Smith	#7; Stuart	#9; Mazeroski	#12; Hoak	#24; Groat	#4; Skinner	#20; Cimoli	#21; Clemente	#29; Daniels
36	May 24	LA	#5; Smith	#7; Stuart	#9; Mazeroski	#12; Hoak	#24; Groat	#4; Skinner	#20; Cimoli	#21; Clemente	#22; Gibbon
37	May 25	LA	#6; Burgess	#14; Nelson	#9; Mazeroski	#12; Hoak	#24; Groat	#4; Skinner	#18; Virdon	#21; Clemente	#37; Umbricht
40	May 30	MIL	#6; Burgess	#7; Stuart	#9; Mazeroski	#12; Hoak	#24; Groat	#4; Skinner	#20; Cimoli	#21; Clemente	#31; Haddix

June

#	Date	Opponent	C	1B	2B	3B	SS	LF	CF	RF	P
49	June 10	@ STL	#6; Burgess	#7; Stuart	#9; Mazeroski	#12; Hoak	#24; Groat	#4; Skinner	#18; Virdon	#21; Clemente	#31; Haddix
50	June 11	@ STL	#5; Smith	#7; Stuart	#9; Mazeroski	#12; Hoak	#24; Groat	#4; Skinner	#20; Cimoli	#21; Clemente	#22; Gibbon
51	June 12	@ STL	#6; Burgess	#7; Stuart	#9; Mazeroski	#12; Hoak	#24; Groat	#4; Skinner	#18; Virdon	#21; Clemente	#32; Law
52	June 12	@ STL	#5; Smith	#7; Stuart	#9; Mazeroski	#12; Hoak	#24; Groat	#4; Skinner	#18; Virdon	#20; Cimoli	#30; Mizell
53	June 14	@ SF									
54	June 15	@ SF									
55	June 16	@ SF									
56	June 17	@ LA	#6; Burgess	#7; Stuart	#9; Mazeroski	#12; Hoak	#24; Groat	#4; Skinner	#18; Virdon	#21; Clemente	#32; Law
57	June 18	@ LA	#5; Smith	#7; Stuart	#9; Mazeroski	#12; Hoak	#24; Groat	#4; Skinner	#20; Cimoli	#21; Clemente	#19; Friend
58	June 19	@ LA	#5; Smith	#7; Stuart	#9; Mazeroski	#12; Hoak	#24; Groat	#4; Skinner	#20; Cimoli	#21; Clemente	#29; Daniels
59	June 21	STL	#6; Burgess	#7; Stuart	#9; Mazeroski	#12; Hoak	#24; Groat	#4; Skinner	#18; Virdon	#21; Clemente	#32; Law
60	June 22	STL	#5; Smith	#14; Nelson	#9; Mazeroski	#12; Hoak	#24; Groat	#4; Skinner	#18; Virdon	#21; Clemente	#19; Friend
61	June 23	STL	#6; Burgess	#7; Stuart	#9; Mazeroski	#12; Hoak	#24; Groat	#4; Skinner	#18; Virdon	#21; Clemente	#31; Haddix
66	June 28	SF									
67	June 30	SF									
68	June 30	SF									

July

#	Date	Opponent	C	1B	2B	3B	SS	LF	CF	RF	P
69	July 1	LA	#5; Smith	#7; Stuart	#9; Mazeroski	#12; Hoak	#24; Groat	#23; Christopher	#20; Cimoli	#21; Clemente	#32; Law
70	July 2	LA	#6; Burgess	#7; Stuart	#9; Mazeroski	#12; Hoak	#24; Groat	#4; Skinner	#18; Virdon	#21; Clemente	#48; Cheney
71	July 3	LA	#6; Burgess	#7; Stuart	#9; Mazeroski	#12; Hoak	#24; Groat	#4; Skinner	#18; Virdon	#21; Clemente	#30; Mizell
72	July 4	@ MIL	#6; Burgess	#7; Stuart	#9; Mazeroski	#12; Hoak	#24; Groat	#4; Skinner	#18; Virdon	#21; Clemente	#19; Friend
73	July 4	@ MIL	#5; Smith	#14; Nelson	#11; Schofield	#12; Hoak	#24; Groat	#4; Skinner	#18; Virdon	#20; Cimoli	#31; Haddix
74	July 5	@ MIL	#5; Smith	#14; Nelson	#9; Mazeroski	#12; Hoak	#24; Groat	#4; Skinner	#18; Virdon	#20; Cimoli	#32; Law
81	July 14	MIL	#6; Burgess	#7; Stuart	#9; Mazeroski	#12; Hoak	#24; Groat	#4; Skinner	#20; Cimoli	#21; Clemente	#31; Haddix
86	July 19	@ LA	#5; Smith	#7; Stuart	#9; Mazeroski	#12; Hoak	#24; Groat	#4; Skinner	#18; Virdon	#21; Clemente	#19; Friend
87	July 20	@ LA	#5; Smith	#7; Stuart	#9; Mazeroski	#12; Hoak	#24; Groat	#4; Skinner	#18; Virdon	#21; Clemente	#39; Witt
88	July 21	@ LA	#5; Smith	#7; Stuart	#9; Mazeroski	#12; Hoak	#24; Groat	#23; Christopher	#20; Cimoli	#21; Clemente	#32; Law
89	July 22	@ SF									
90	July 23	@ SF									
91	July 24	@ SF									
92	July 25	@ STL	#6; Burgess	#14; Nelson	#9; Mazeroski	#12; Hoak	#24; Groat	#4; Skinner	#18; Virdon	#21; Clemente	#19; Friend
93	July 26	@ STL	#6; Burgess	#7; Stuart	#9; Mazeroski	#12; Hoak	#24; Groat	#23; Christopher	#20; Cimoli	#21; Clemente	#32; Law
94	July 27	@ STL	#5; Smith	#7; Stuart	#9; Mazeroski	#12; Hoak	#24; Groat	#23; Christopher	#20; Cimoli	#21; Clemente	#39; Witt

August

#	Date	Opponent	C	1B	2B	3B	SS	LF	CF	RF	P
98	August 2	LA	#6; Burgess	#14; Nelson	#9; Mazeroski	#12; Hoak	#24; Groat	#4; Skinner	#18; Virdon	#21; Clemente	#32; Law
99	August 3	LA	#5; Smith	#7; Stuart	#9; Mazeroski	#12; Hoak	#24; Groat	#4; Skinner	#20; Cimoli	#21; Clemente	#19; Friend
100	August 4	LA	#6; Burgess	#14; Nelson	#9; Mazeroski	#12; Hoak	#24; Groat	#4; Skinner	#18; Virdon	#21; Clemente	#39; Witt
101	August 5	SF									
102	August 6	SF									
103	August 7	SF									
104	August 7	SF									
107	August 11	STL	#6; Burgess	#14; Nelson	#9; Mazeroski	#12; Hoak	#24; Groat	#4; Skinner	#18; Virdon	#20; Cimoli	#19; Friend
108	August 12	STL	#6; Burgess	#14; Nelson	#9; Mazeroski	#12; Hoak	#24; Groat	#4; Skinner	#18; Virdon	#21; Clemente	#39; Witt
109	August 13	STL	#5; Smith	#7; Stuart	#9; Mazeroski	#12; Hoak	#24; Groat	#20; Cimoli	#18; Virdon	#21; Clemente	#31; Haddix
110	August 14	STL	#6; Burgess	#14; Nelson	#9; Mazeroski	#12; Hoak	#24; Groat	#4; Skinner	#18; Virdon	#21; Clemente	#32; Law
111	August 14	STL	#5; Smith	#7; Stuart	#9; Mazeroski	#12; Hoak	#24; Groat	#23; Christopher	#18; Virdon	#20; Cimoli	#48; Cheney
123	August 26	@ STL	#6; Burgess	#7; Stuart	#9; Mazeroski	#12; Hoak	#24; Groat	#20; Cimoli	#18; Virdon	#21; Clemente	#19; Friend
124	August 27	@ STL	#6; Burgess	#14; Nelson	#9; Mazeroski	#12; Hoak	#24; Groat	#4; Skinner	#18; Virdon	#21; Clemente	#48; Cheney
125	August 28	@ STL	#5; Smith	#7; Stuart	#9; Mazeroski	#12; Hoak	#24; Groat	#20; Cimoli	#18; Virdon	#21; Clemente	#31; Haddix
126	August 29	@ LA	#5; Smith	#7; Stuart	#9; Mazeroski	#12; Hoak	#24; Groat	#4; Skinner	#20; Cimoli	#21; Clemente	#32; Law
127	August 30	@ LA	#5; Smith	#7; Stuart	#9; Mazeroski	#12; Hoak	#24; Groat	#4; Skinner	#20; Cimoli	#21; Clemente	#19; Friend
128	August 31	@ SF									

September

#	Date	Opponent	C	1B	2B	3B	SS	LF	CF	RF	P
129	September 1	@ SF									
132	September 5	MIL	#5; Smith	#7; Stuart	#9; Mazeroski	#12; Hoak	#24; Groat	#20; Cimoli	#18; Virdon	#21; Clemente	#19; Friend
133	September 5	MIL	#6; Burgess	#7; Stuart	#9; Mazeroski	#12; Hoak	#24; Groat	#4; Skinner	#18; Virdon	#21; Clemente	#31; Haddix
134	September 6	MIL	#6; Burgess	#7; Stuart	#9; Mazeroski	#12; Hoak	#24; Groat	#4; Skinner	#18; Virdon	#21; Clemente	#22; Gibbon
135	September 7	STL	#6; Burgess	#7; Stuart	#9; Mazeroski	#12; Hoak	#11; Schofield	#4; Skinner	#18; Virdon	#21; Clemente	#32; Law
138	September 12	SF									
139	September 13	SF									
140	September 14	LA	#6; Burgess	#7; Stuart	#9; Mazeroski	#12; Hoak	#11; Schofield	#4; Skinner	#20; Cimoli	#21; Clemente	#32; Law
141	September 15	LA	#6; Burgess	#7; Stuart	#9; Mazeroski	#12; Hoak	#11; Schofield	#4; Skinner	#20; Cimoli	#21; Clemente	#19; Friend
149	September 23	@ MIL	#6; Burgess	#7; Stuart	#9; Mazeroski	#12; Hoak	#11; Schofield	#4; Skinner	#18; Virdon	#21; Clemente	#39; Witt
150	September 24	@ MIL	#6; Burgess	#7; Stuart	#9; Mazeroski	#12; Hoak	#11; Schofield	#4; Skinner	#18; Virdon	#21; Clemente	#19; Friend
151	September 25	@ MIL	#5; Smith	#7; Stuart	#9; Mazeroski	#12; Hoak	#11; Schofield	#4; Skinner	#20; Cimoli	#21; Clemente	#31; Haddix
153	September 30	MIL	#6; Burgess	#14; Nelson	#9; Mazeroski	#12; Hoak	#11; Schofield	#4; Skinner	#18; Virdon	#21; Clemente	#32; Law

October

#	Date	Opponent	C	1B	2B	3B	SS	LF	CF	RF	P
154	October 1	MIL	#5; Smith	#7; Stuart	#9; Mazeroski	#12; Hoak	#24; Groat	#20; Cimoli	#18; Virdon	#21; Clemente	#19; Friend
155	October 2	MIL	#6; Burgess	#14; Nelson	#11; Schofield	#12; Hoak	#24; Groat	#4; Skinner	#23; Christopher	#21; Clemente	#31; Haddix

=== World Series ===
==== Batting Order ====
1960 Postseason Batting Order game log
World Series: vs. New York Yankees

#	Date	Opponent	1st	2nd	3rd	4th	5th	6th	7th	8th	9th
1	October 5	NYY	#18; Virdon (CF)	#24; Groat (SS)	#4; Skinner (LF)	#7; Stuart (1B)	#21; Clemente (RF)	#6; Burgess (C)	#12; Hoak (3B)	#9; Mazeroski (2B)	#32; Law (SP)
2	October 6	NYY	#18; Virdon (CF)	#24; Groat (SS)	#21; Clemente (RF)	#14; Nelson (1B)	#20; Cimoli (LF)	#6; Burgess (C)	#12; Hoak (3B)	#9; Mazeroski (2B)	#19; Friend (SP)
3	October 8	@ NYY	#18; Virdon (CF)	#24; Groat (SS)	#21; Clemente (RF)	#7; Stuart (1B)	#20; Cimoli (LF)	#5; Smith (C)	#12; Hoak (3B)	#9; Mazeroski (2B)	#30; Mizell (SP)
4	October 9	@ NYY	#18; Virdon (CF)	#24; Groat (SS)	#21; Clemente (RF)	#7; Stuart (1B)	#20; Cimoli (LF)	#6; Burgess (C)	#12; Hoak (3B)	#9; Mazeroski (2B)	#32; Law (SP)
5	October 10	@ NYY	#18; Virdon (CF)	#24; Groat (SS)	#21; Clemente (RF)	#7; Stuart (1B)	#20; Cimoli (LF)	#6; Burgess (C)	#12; Hoak (3B)	#9; Mazeroski (2B)	#31; Haddix (SP)
6	October 12	NYY	#18; Virdon (CF)	#24; Groat (SS)	#21; Clemente (RF)	#7; Stuart (1B)	#20; Cimoli (LF)	#5; Smith (C)	#12; Hoak (3B)	#9; Mazeroski (2B)	#19; Friend (SP)
7	October 13	NYY	#18; Virdon (CF)	#24; Groat (SS)	#4; Skinner (LF)	#14; Nelson (1B)	#21; Clemente (RF)	#6; Burgess (C)	#12; Hoak (3B)	#9; Mazeroski (2B)	#32; Law (SP)

==== Defensive Lineup ====
1960 Postseason Defensive Lineup game log
World Series: vs. New York Yankees

#	Date	Opponent	C	1B	2B	3B	SS	LF	CF	RF	P
1	October 5	NYY	#6; Burgess	#24; Stuart	#9; Mazeroski	#12; Hoak	#24; Groat	#4; Skinner	#18; Virdon	#21; Clemente	#32; Law
2	October 6	NYY	#6; Burgess	#14; Nelson	#9; Mazeroski	#12; Hoak	#24; Groat	#20; Cimoli	#18; Virdon	#21; Clemente	#19; Friend
3	October 8	@ NYY	#5; Smith	#7; Stuart	#9; Mazeroski	#12; Hoak	#24; Groat	#20; Cimoli	#18; Virdon	#21; Clemente	#30; Mizell
4	October 9	@ NYY	#6; Burgess	#7; Stuart	#9; Mazeroski	#12; Hoak	#24; Groat	#20; Cimoli	#18; Virdon	#21; Clemente	#32; Law
5	October 10	@ NYY	#6; Burgess	#7; Stuart	#9; Mazeroski	#12; Hoak	#24; Groat	#20; Cimoli	#18; Virdon	#21; Clemente	#31; Haddix
6	October 12	NYY	#5; Smith	#7; Stuart	#9; Mazeroski	#12; Hoak	#24; Groat	#20; Cimoli	#18; Virdon	#21; Clemente	#19; Friend
7	October 13	NYY	#6; Burgess	#14; Nelson	#9; Mazeroski	#12; Hoak	#24; Groat	#4; Skinner	#18; Virdon	#21; Clemente	#32; Law

== Game Umpires ==
=== Regular Season ===
1960 Regular Season Umpire game log
April

#	Date	Opponent	HP	1B	2B	3B
1	April 12	@ MIL	Dusty Boggess	Tom Gorman	Vinnie Smith	Ed Sudol
9	April 22	MIL	Shag Crawford	Tony Venzon	Frank Dascoli	Frank Secory
10	April 23	MIL	Tony Venzon	Frank Dascoli	Frank Secory	Shag Crawford
11	April 24	MIL	Frank Dascoli	Frank Secory	Shag Crawford	Tony Venzon

May

#	Date	Opponent	HP	1B	2B	3B
16	May 2	@ STL	Chris Pelekoudas	Bill Jackowski	Stan Landes	Al Barlick
19	May 6	@ SF	Shag Crawford	Tony Venzon	Frank Dascoli	Frank Secory
20	May 7	@ SF	Tony Venzon	Frank Dascoli	Frank Secory	Shag Crawford
21	May 8	@ SF	Frank Dascoli	Frank Secory	Shag Crawford	Tony Venzon
22	May 9	@ LA	Frank Secory	Shag Crawford	Tony Venzon	Frank Dascoli
23	May 10	@ LA	Shag Crawford	Tony Venzon	Frank Dascoli	Frank Secory
24	May 11	@ LA	Tony Venzon	Frank Dascoli	Frank Secory	Shag Crawford
25	May 13	@ MIL	Ed Sudol	Dusty Boggess	Tom Gorman	Vinnie Smith
26	May 14	@ MIL	Dusty Boggess	Tom Gorman	Vinnie Smith	Ed Sudol
27	May 15	@ MIL	Tom Gorman	Vinnie Smith	Ed Sudol	Dusty Boggess
28	May 15	@ MIL	Vinnie Smith	Ed Sudol	Dusty Boggess	Tom Gorman
30	May 18	STL	Augie Donatelli	Ken Burkhart	Ed Vargo	Jocko Conlan
31	May 19	STL	Ken Burkhart	Ed Vargo	Jocko Conlan	Augie Donatelli
32	May 20	SF	Tom Gorman	Vinnie Smith	Ed Sudol	Dusty Boggess
33	May 21	SF	Vinnie Smith	Ed Sudol	Dusty Boggess	Tom Gorman
34	May 22	SF	Ed Sudol	Dusty Boggess	Tom Gorman	Vinnie Smith
35	May 23	LA	Chris Pelekoudas	Bill Jackowski	Stan Landes	Al Barlick
36	May 24	LA	Bill Jackowski	Stan Landes	Al Barlick	Chris Pelekoudas
37	May 25	LA	Stan Landes	Al Barlick	Chris Pelekoudas	Bill Jackowski
40	May 30	MIL	Frank Dascoli	Frank Secory	Shag Crawford	Tony Venzon

June

#	Date	Opponent	HP	1B	2B	3B
49	June 10	@ STL	Jocko Conlan	Augie Donatelli	(none)	Ken Burkhart
50	June 11	@ STL	Augie Donatelli	Ken Burkhart	(none)	Jocko Conlan
51	June 12	@ STL	Ken Burkhart	Jocko Conlan	(none)	Augie Donatelli
52	June 12	@ STL	Jocko Conlan	Augie Donatelli	(none)	Ken Burkhart
53	June 14	@ SF	Frank Dascoli	Frank Secory	Shag Crawford	Tony Venzon
54	June 15	@ SF	Frank Secory	Shag Crawford	Tony Venzon	Frank Dascoli
55	June 16	@ SF	Shag Crawford	Tony Venzon	Frank Dascoli	Frank Secory
56	June 17	@ LA	Augie Donatelli	Ken Burkhart	Ed Vargo	Jocko Conlan
57	June 18	@ LA	Ken Burkhart	Ed Vargo	Jocko Conlan	Augie Donatelli
58	June 19	@ LA	Ed Vargo	Jocko Conlan	Augie Donatelli	Ken Burkhart
59	June 21	STL	Shag Crawford	Tony Venzon	Frank Dascoli	Frank Secory
60	June 22	STL	Tony Venzon	Frank Dascoli	Frank Secory	Shag Crawford
61	June 23	STL	Frank Dascoli	Frank Secory	Shag Crawford	Tony Venzon
66	June 28	SF	Augie Donatelli	Ken Burkhart	Jocko Conlan	Ed Vargo
67	June 30	SF	Jocko Conlan	Ken Burkhart	Ed Vargo	Augie Donatelli
68	June 30	SF	Ken Burkhart	Ed Vargo	Augie Donatelli	Jocko Conlan

July

#	Date	Opponent	HP	1B	2B	3B
69	July 1	LA	Al Barlick	Bill Jackowski	Stan Landes	Chris Pelekoudas
70	July 2	LA	Bill Jackowski	Stan Landes	Chris Pelekoudas	Al Barlick
71	July 3	LA	Stan Landes	Chris Pelekoudas	(none)	Bill Jackowski
72	July 4	@ MIL	Ken Burkhart	Ed Vargo	Augie Donatelli	Jocko Conlan
73	July 4	@ MIL	Ed Vargo	Augie Donatelli	Jocko Conlan	Ken Burkhart
74	July 5	@ MIL	Augie Donatelli	Jocko Conlan	Ken Burkhart	Ed Vargo
81	July 14	MIL	Dusty Boggess	Tom Gorman	Vinnie Smith	Ed Sudol
86	July 19	@ LA	Stan Landes	Chris Pelekoudas	Al Barlick	Bill Jackowski
87	July 20	@ LA	Chris Pelekoudas	Al Barlick	Bill Jackowski	Stan Landes
88	July 21	@ LA	Al Barlick	Bill Jackowski	Stan Landes	Chris Pelekoudas
89	July 22	@ SF	Bill Jackowski	Stan Landes	Chris Pelekoudas	Al Barlick
90	July 23	@ SF	Stan Landes	Chris Pelekoudas	Al Barlick	Bill Jackowski
91	July 24	@ SF	Chris Pelekoudas	Al Barlick	Bill Jackowski	Stan Landes
92	July 25	@ STL	Shag Crawford	Tony Venzon	Frank Dascoli	Frank Secory
93	July 26	@ STL	Tony Venzon	Frank Dascoli	Frank Secory	Shag Crawford
94	July 27	@ STL	Frank Dascoli	Frank Secory	Shag Crawford	Tony Venzon

August

#	Date	Opponent	HP	1B	2B	3B
98	August 2	LA	Jocko Conlan	Ken Burkhart	Ed Vargo	Augie Donatelli
99	August 3	LA	Ken Burkhart	Ed Vargo	Augie Donatelli	Jocko Conlan
100	August 4	LA	Ed Vargo	Augie Donatelli	Jocko Conlan	Ken Burkhart
101	August 5	SF	Dusty Boggess	Tom Gorman	Vinnie Smith	Ed Sudol
102	August 6	SF	Tom Gorman	Vinnie Smith	Ed Sudol	Dusty Boggess
103	August 7	SF	Vinnie Smith	Ed Sudol	Dusty Boggess	Tom Gorman
104	August 7	SF	Ed Sudol	Dusty Boggess	Tom Gorman	Vinnie Smith
107	August 11	STL	Al Barlick	Bill Jackowski	Stan Landes	Chris Pelekoudas
108	August 12	STL	Bill Jackowski	Stan Landes	Chris Pelekoudas	Al Barlick
109	August 13	STL	Stan Landes	Chris Pelekoudas	Al Barlick	Bill Jackowski
110	August 14	STL	Chris Pelekoudas	Al Barlick	Bill Jackowski	Stan Landes
111	August 14	STL	Al Barlick	Bill Jackowski	Stan Landes	Chris Pelekoudas
123	August 26	@ STL	Chris Pelekoudas	Al Barlick	Bill Jackowski	Stan Landes
124	August 27	@ STL	Al Barlick	Bill Jackowski	Stan Landes	Chris Pelekoudas
125	August 28	@ STL	Bill Jackowski	Stan Landes	Chris Pelekoudas	Al Barlick
126	August 29	@ LA	Tom Gorman	Vinnie Smith	Ed Sudol	Dusty Boggess
127	August 30	@ LA	Vinnie Smith	Ed Sudol	Dusty Boggess	Tom Gorman
128	August 31	@ SF	Ed Sudol	Dusty Boggess	Tom Gorman	Vinnie Smith

September

#	Date	Opponent	HP	1B	2B	3B
129	September 1	@ SF	Dusty Boggess	Tom Gorman	Vinnie Smith	Ed Sudol
132	September 5	MIL	Al Barlick	Bill Jackowski	Stan Landes	Chris Pelekoudas
133	September 5	MIL	Bill Jackowski	Stan Landes	Chris Pelekoudas	Al Barlick
134	September 6	MIL	Stan Landes	Chris Pelekoudas	Al Barlick	Bill Jackowski
135	September 7	STL	Ed Vargo	Jocko Conlan	Augie Donatelli	Ken Burkhart
138	September 12	SF	Al Barlick	Bill Jackowski	Stan Landes	Chris Pelekoudas
139	September 13	SF	Bill Jackowski	Stan Landes	Chris Pelekoudas	Al Barlick
140	September 14	LA	Tony Venzon	Frank Dascoli	Frank Secory	Shag Crawford
141	September 15	LA	Frank Dascoli	Frank Secory	Shag Crawford	Tony Venzon
149	September 23	@ MIL	Ed Sudol	Dusty Boggess	Tom Gorman	Vinnie Smith
150	September 24	@ MIL	Dusty Boggess	Tom Gorman	Vinnie Smith	Ed Sudol
151	September 25	@ MIL	Tom Gorman	Vinnie Smith	Ed Sudol	Dusty Boggess
153	September 30	MIL	Vinnie Smith	Ed Sudol	(none)	Chris Pelekoudas

October

#	Date	Opponent	HP	1B	2B	3B
154	October 1	MIL	Ed Sudol	Chris Pelekoudas	(none)	Vinnie Smith
155	October 2	MIL	Vinnie Smith	Chris Pelekoudas	Ed Sudol	Al Barlick

=== World Series ===
1960 Postseason Umpire game log
World Series: vs. New York Yankees

#	Date	Opponent	HP	1B	2B	3B	LF	RF
1	October 5	NYY	Dusty Boggess (NL) (crew chief)	Johnny Stevens (AL)	Bill Jackowski (NL)	Nestor Chylak (AL)	Stan Landes (NL)	Jim Honochick (AL)
2	October 6	NYY	Johnny Stevens (AL)	Bill Jackowski (NL)	Nestor Chylak (AL)	Dusty Boggess (NL) (crew chief)	Stan Landes (NL)	Jim Honochick (AL)
3	October 8	@ NYY	Bill Jackowski (NL)	Nestor Chylak (AL)	Dusty Boggess (NL) (crew chief)	Johnny Stevens (AL)	Jim Honochick (AL)	Stan Landes (NL)
4	October 9	@ NYY	Nestor Chylak (AL)	Dusty Boggess (NL) (crew chief)	Johnny Stevens (AL)	Bill Jackowski (NL)	Stan Landes (NL)	Jim Honochick (AL)
5	October 10	@ NYY	Dusty Boggess (NL) (crew chief)	Johnny Stevens (AL)	Bill Jackowski (NL)	Nestor Chylak (AL)	Stan Landes (NL)	Jim Honochick (AL)
6	October 12	NYY	Johnny Stevens (AL)	Bill Jackowski (NL)	Nestor Chylak (AL)	Dusty Boggess (NL) (crew chief)	Stan Landes (NL)	Jim Honochick (AL)
7	October 13	NYY	Bill Jackowski (NL)	Nestor Chylak (AL)	Dusty Boggess (NL) (crew chief)	Johnny Stevens (AL)	Stan Landes (NL)	Jim Honochick (AL)

== Statistics ==
= Indicates league leader

Batting

Note: G = Games played; AB = At bats; H = Hits; Avg. = Batting average; HR = Home runs; RBI = Runs batted in

Regular season
Player	G	AB	H	Avg.	HR	RBI
Roy Face	68	17	7	0.412	0	0
Fred Green	45	8	3	0.375	2	2
Dick Schofield	65	102	34	0.333	0	10
Jim Umbricht	17	6	2	0.333	0	0
Dick Groat	138	573	186	0.325	2	50
Roberto Clemente	144	570	179	0.314	16	94
Rocky Nelson	93	200	60	0.300	7	35
Hal Smith	77	258	76	0.295	11	45
Smoky Burgess	110	337	99	0.294	7	39
Don Hoak	155	553	156	0.282	16	79
Bill Mazeroski	151	538	147	0.273	11	64
Bob Skinner	145	571	156	0.273	15	86
Gino Cimoli	101	307	82	0.267	0	28
Bill Virdon	120	409	108	0.264	8	40
Dick Stuart	122	438	114	0.260	23	83
Harvey Haddix	29	67	17	0.254	0	7
Gene Baker	33	37	9	0.243	0	4
Joe Christopher	50	56	13	0.232	1	3
Joe Gibbon	27	19	4	0.211	0	0
Bob Oldis	22	20	4	0.200	0	1
Bennie Daniels	10	16	3	0.188	0	2
Vern Law	35	94	17	0.181	1	7
Tom Cheney	11	17	3	0.176	0	2
Vinegar Bend Mizell	23	51	7	0.137	0	3
Mickey Vernon	9	8	1	0.125	0	1
Bob Friend	38	88	6	0.068	0	3
Dick Barone	3	6	0	0.000	0	0
Harry Bright	4	4	0	0.000	0	0
Earl Francis	7	5	0	0.000	0	0
Paul Giel	16	7	0	0.000	0	0
Danny Kravitz	8	6	0	0.000	0	0
Clem Labine	15	4	0	0.000	0	1
Roman Mejias	3	1	0	0.000	0	0
Diomedes Olivo	4	1	0	0.000	0	0
R C Stevens	9	3	0	0.000	0	0
George Witt	10	9	0	0.000	0	0
Don Gross	5	0	0	—	0	0
Team totals	155	5,406	1,493	0.276	120	689

World Series
Player	G	AB	H	Avg.	HR	RBI
Hal Smith	3	8	3	0.375	1	3
Smoky Burgess	5	18	6	0.333	0	0
Harvey Haddix	2	3	1	0.333	0	0
Vern Law	3	6	2	0.333	0	1
Rocky Nelson	4	9	3	0.333	1	2
Dick Schofield	3	3	1	0.333	0	0
Bill Mazeroski	7	25	8	0.320	2	5
Roberto Clemente	7	29	9	0.310	0	3
Gino Cimoli	7	20	5	0.250	0	1
Bill Virdon	7	29	7	0.241	0	5
Don Hoak	7	23	5	0.217	0	3
Dick Groat	7	28	6	0.214	0	2
Bob Skinner	2	5	1	0.200	0	1
Dick Stuart	5	20	3	0.150	0	0
Gene Baker	3	3	0	0.000	0	0
Roy Face	4	3	0	0.000	0	0
Bob Friend	3	1	0	0.000	0	0
Fred Green	3	1	0	0.000	0	0
Tom Cheney	3	0	0	—	0	0
Joe Christopher	3	0	0	—	0	0
Joe Gibbon	2	0	0	—	0	0
Clem Labine	3	0	0	—	0	0
Vinegar Bend Mizell	2	0	0	—	0	0
Bob Oldis	2	0	0	—	0	0
George Witt	3	0	0	—	0	0
Team totals	7	234	60	0.256	4	26

Pitching

Note: G = Games pitched; IP = Innings pitched; W = Wins; L = Losses; ERA = Earned run average; SO = Strikeouts

Regular season
Player	G	IP	W	L	ERA	SO
Clem Labine	15	30 1/3	3	0	1.48	21
Earl Francis	7	18	1	0	2.00	8
Diomedes Olivo	4	9 2/3	0	0	2.79	10
Roy Face	68	114 2/3	10	8	2.90	72
Bob Friend	38	275 2/3	18	12	3.00	183
Vern Law	35	271 2/3	20	9	3.08	120
Vinegar Bend Mizell	23	155 2/3	13	5	3.12	71
Fred Green	45	70	8	4	3.21	49
Don Gross	5	5 1/3	0	0	3.38	3
Harvey Haddix	29	172 1/3	11	10	3.97	101
Tom Cheney	11	52	2	2	3.98	35
Joe Gibbon	27	80 1/3	4	2	4.03	60
George Witt	10	30	1	2	4.20	15
Jim Umbricht	17	40 2/3	1	2	5.09	26
Paul Giel	16	33	2	0	5.73	21
Bennie Daniels	10	40 1/3	1	3	7.81	16
Team totals	155	1,399 2/3	95	59	3.49	811

World Series
Player	G	IP	W	L	ERA	SO
George Witt	3	2 2/3	0	0	0.00	1
Harvey Haddix	2	7 1/3	2	0	2.45	6
Vern Law	3	18 1/3	2	0	3.44	8
Tom Cheney	3	4	0	0	4.50	6
Roy Face	4	10 1/3	0	0	5.23	4
Joe Gibbon	2	3	0	0	9.00	2
Bob Friend	3	6	0	2	13.50	7
Clem Labine	3	4	0	0	13.50	2
Vinegar Bend Mizell	2	2 1/3	0	1	15.43	1
Fred Green	3	4	0	0	22.50	3
Team totals	7	62	4	3	7.11	40

== Awards and honors ==
- Dick Groat, Shortstop, National League MVP
- Vernon Law, (20/9), MLB

Cy Young

- Bill Mazeroski, Babe Ruth Award
- Danny Murtaugh, Associated Press NL Manager of the Year

=== All-Stars ===
1960 Major League Baseball All-Star Game, 1960 Major League Baseball All-Star Game

- Smoky Burgess
- Roberto Clemente
- Roy Face
- Bob Friend (starting P, first game)
- Dick Groat
- Vern Law (starting P, second game)
- Bill Mazeroski (starting 2B)
- Bob Skinner (starting LF)

=== League leaders ===
- Roberto Clemente, Led National League in outfield assists, 19 baserunners thrown out
- Dick Groat, Led National League in batting average

== Farm system ==
Level	Team	League	Manager
AAA	Columbus Jets	International League	Cal Ermer
AAA	Salt Lake City Bees	Pacific Coast League	Larry Shepard
A	Savannah Pirates	Sally League	Ray Hathaway
B	Burlington Bees	Illinois–Indiana–Iowa League	Harding "Pete" Peterson
C	Grand Forks Chiefs	Northern League	Bob Clear
D	Kingsport Pirates	Appalachian League	Jim Gibbons
D	Dubuque Packers	Midwest League	James Adlam
D	Hobbs Pirates	Sophomore League	Al Kubski

LEAGUE CHAMPIONS: Savannah, Hobbs
