= Dick Barone =

American baseball player (1932–2015)

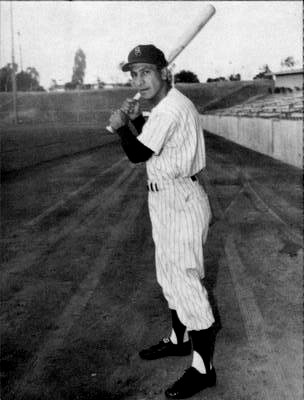
- Shortstop
- Born: October 13, 1932; San Jose, California, U.S.
- Died: April 23, 2015 (aged 82); Hollister, California, U.S.
- Batted: Right Threw: Right

MLB debut
- September 22, 1960, for the Pittsburgh Pirates

Last MLB appearance
- September 30, 1960, for the Pittsburgh Pirates

MLB statistics
- Batting average: .000
- At bats: 6
- Run batted in: 0
- Stats at Baseball Reference

Teams
- Pittsburgh Pirates (1960)

Richard Anthony Barone (October 13, 1932 – April 23, 2015) was an American professional baseball player. A shortstop and second baseman, he played for a decade in minor league baseball, and appeared in three Major League Baseball (MLB) games with the 1960 Pittsburgh Pirates. The native of San Jose, California, threw and batted right-handed, stood 5 feet 9 inches (1.75 m) tall and weighed 165 pounds (75 kg). He was the grandfather of former major league pitcher Daniel Barone.

== Biography ==
Barone was in his eighth season of professional baseball when the Pittsburgh Pirates called him up in September 1960, when MLB active rosters expanded to 40 players. He had batted .204 in 143 games played for the Triple-A Columbus Jets of the International League. The 1960 Pirates were en route to their first National League title since 1927. Barone debuted as a pinch runner for 42-year-old player-coach Mickey Vernon on September 22 in the ninth inning of a 2–2 game against the Chicago Cubs, but did not score in a contest eventually won by Pittsburgh, 3–2 in 11 innings. The Pirates clinched the pennant three days later, on September 25.

On September 27, Barone started his only major league game. Playing shortstop against the Cincinnati Reds, he played errorless ball in the field, handling five chances, and went hitless in five at bats and five plate appearances against the Reds' pitchers Bob Purkey, Orlando Peña and Cal McLish. It was another extra-inning game: Barone played the first 13 innings before he was removed for pinch hitter Smoky Burgess. The Pirates prevailed, 4–3, in 16 innings.

On September 30, Barone appeared in his last major league contest as a late-inning defensive replacement, also making a fly ball out in one at bat against Bob Buhl of the Milwaukee Braves. He was not on the Pirates' 1960 World Series roster.

Barone played two more seasons of minor league baseball before retiring after the 1962 campaign.
