= George Witt (baseball) =

American baseball player (1931–2013)

Red Witt
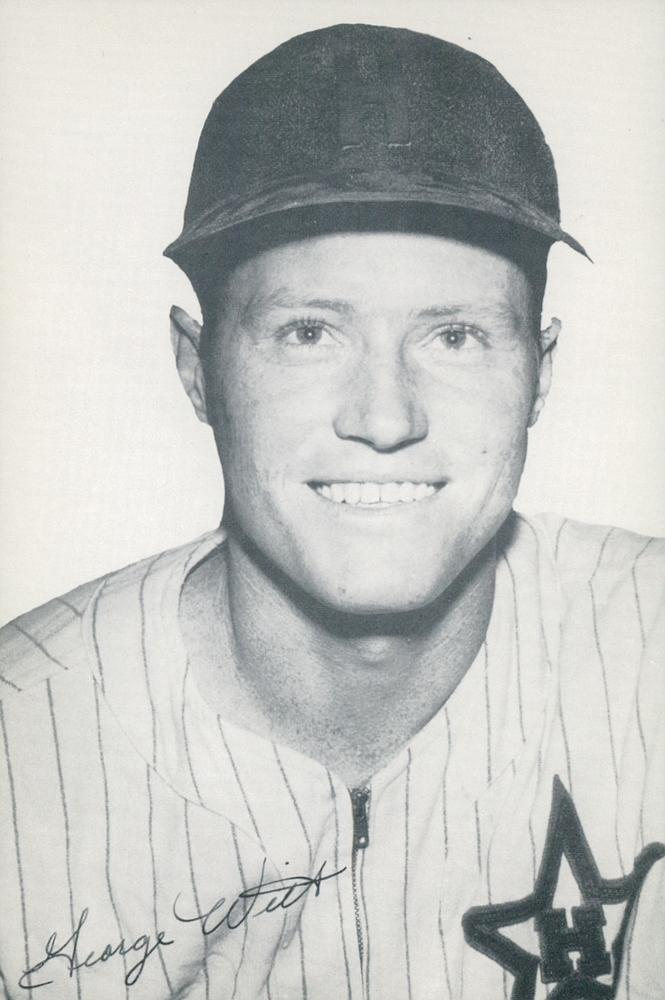
- Witt with the Hollywood Stars c. 1957
- Pitcher
- Born: November 9, 1931; Long Beach, California, U.S.
- Died: January 30, 2013 (aged 81); Laguna Beach, California, U.S.
- Batted: Right Threw: Right

MLB debut
- September 21, 1957, for the Pittsburgh Pirates

Last MLB appearance
- June 10, 1962, for the Houston Colt .45s

MLB statistics
- Win–loss record: 11–16
- Earned run average: 4.32
- Strikeouts: 156
- Stats at Baseball Reference

Teams
- Pittsburgh Pirates (1957–1961); Los Angeles Angels (1962); Houston Colt .45s (1962)

Career highlights and awards
- World Series champion (1960)

George Adrian "Red" Witt (November 9, 1931 – January 30, 2013), was an American professional baseball player, a right-handed pitcher who played all or part of six seasons in Major League Baseball (1957–62) with the Pittsburgh Pirates, Los Angeles Angels and Houston Colt .45s. The native of Long Beach, California, stood 6 feet 3 inches (1.91 m) tall and weighed 185 pounds (84 kg) during his playing career. He graduated from California State University, Long Beach.

Witt began his baseball career in 1950 as a member of the Brooklyn Dodgers' organization and was drafted by the Pirates from Brooklyn following the 1954 season. In 1957, he won 18 games (losing seven) for the top-level Hollywood Stars of the Pacific Coast League, then had notable back-to-back seasons for the Pirates in 1958–59. In 1958, he helped pitch Pittsburgh to a first division finish and the club's first winning season in a decade with a 9–2 record and a sparkling 1.61 earned run average in 18 games pitched and 15 starting assignments. He threw five complete games and three shutouts. But in 1959, hampered by a sore elbow, he worked in only 15 games and lost all of his seven decisions. He spent part of 1960 back in minor league baseball.

But he also appeared in ten games (with six starts) for the 1960 National League and World Series champion Pirates. He made three relief appearances in the World Series, which was marked by three lopsided New York Yankees victories and four close Pittsburgh triumphs. Witt appeared in the Yankee routs, Games 2, 3 and 6, and although he was not charged with allowing any runs in 22/3 innings pitched, he permitted four inherited baserunners to score. Witt played three more seasons, splitting 1961 and 1962 between minor league service and big-league trials with the Pirates, Angels and Colt .45s.

For his MLB career he compiled an 11–16 record with a 4.32 earned run average and 156 strikeouts in 66 appearances and 229 total innings pitched; he allowed 225 hits and 127 bases on balls, and recorded no shutouts or complete games after 1958.

Witt was a high school physical education instructor, a science teacher, and a baseball and tennis coach at Tustin High School in Tustin, California, as well as a former Foreign Study League group leader, where he led high school students through a number of European foreign capitals comparing different governmental systems.
