= Harvey Haddix's near-perfect game =

Baseball game on May 26, 1959

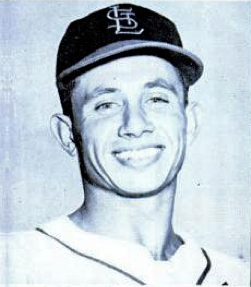
- Harvey Haddix in 1953, six years before his 12-perfect-inning game
Pittsburgh Pirates	Milwaukee Braves
0	1
	1	2	3	4	5	6	7	8	9	10	11	12	13	R	H	E
Pittsburgh Pirates	0	0	0	0	0	0	0	0	0	0	0	0	0	0	12	1
Milwaukee Braves	0	0	0	0	0	0	0	0	0	0	0	0	1	1	1	0
- Date: May 26, 1959
- Venue: Milwaukee County Stadium
- City: Milwaukee, Wisconsin
- Managers: Danny Murtaugh (Pittsburgh Pirates); Fred Haney (Milwaukee Braves)
- Umpires: HP: Vinnie Smith; 1B: Frank Dascoli; 2B: Frank Secory; 3B: Hal Dixon
- Attendance: 19,194

On May 26, 1959, Harvey Haddix of the Pittsburgh Pirates pitched a perfect game for 12 innings against the Milwaukee Braves, but lost the no-hitter and the game in the 13th inning. The game was played at Milwaukee County Stadium.

Haddix' perfect game bid was broken up in the bottom of the 13th inning, when a throwing error by Pirate third baseman Don Hoak allowed Félix Mantilla to reach base. Haddix lost the no-hitter, and the game along with it, when Joe Adcock hit what appeared to be a walk-off three-run home run. However, Hank Aaron's baserunning mistake caused Adcock's home run to be ruled a one-run double by National League President Warren Giles, some time later.

Braves starter Lew Burdette, despite giving up eight hits through nine innings, was pitching a shutout of his own. Several times, the Pirates came close to scoring the winning run for Haddix:

- In the third inning, a baserunning blunder by Roman Mejias—trying to go from first to third on an infield single by Haddix—turned into an out at third, and negated an inning in which the Pirates hit three singles.
- In the top of the ninth inning, Bill Virdon, after reaching base on a one-out hit, advanced to third on Rocky Nelson's single. However, Bob Skinner grounded back to Burdette to end the threat.
- In the 10th inning, with the Pirates still scoreless, slugging pinch hitter Dick Stuart flied out to center fielder Andy Pafko on a ball that came within a few feet of being a two-run home run.
- The Pirates also recorded hits in the 11th, 12th and 13th innings, but left a runner on base in each of the latter two innings.

In 1989 it was revealed that during the game the Milwaukee bullpen tracked Haddix's intended pitches and signaled the batters what pitch was to come. All the players except Aaron took the stolen signals, including Joe Adcock when he hit his game winning home run.

== The 13th inning ==
Félix Mantilla, who entered the game in the 11th after Del Rice had pinch-hit for Johnny O'Brien, was the Braves' first hitter in the 13th inning. Mantilla hit a ground ball to third base, Hoak fielded the ball cleanly but threw wide to first, pulling Nelson off the base and ending the perfect game when Mantilla was safe. Mantilla was then sacrificed to second by Eddie Mathews. Haddix, his perfect game bid gone but his no-hit bid still intact, then intentionally walked Hank Aaron to set up a double play situation for the slow-footed Adcock, who had already grounded out twice earlier in the game, striking out the other two times. Adcock hit a fly ball to deep right-center field, just beyond the reach of right fielder Joe Christopher, who was making his Major League debut (he replaced Román Mejías in right field after Stuart had pinch-hit for Mejías), for an apparent home run, the ball landing between the outfield fence and another fence behind it, in front of a line of pine trees.

Mantilla rounded third and touched home plate for the winning run; however, in the confusion, Aaron saw the ball hit the second fence but did not realize it had carried over the first and, thinking that the game had ended when Mantilla scored the winning run, rounded second and headed for the dugout. Adcock rounded the bases, running out his home run. First base umpire Frank Dascoli ruled that the final score was 2-0; he was overruled by National League president Warren Giles, who changed Adcock's home run to a double and declared that only Mantilla's run counted for a final score of 1-0.

In addition to Stuart being used as a pinch hitter, two other Pirate regulars did not play in this game: Dick Groat, who would win the 1960 National League Most Valuable Player Award, was mired in a slump and had been benched, and Roberto Clemente was sidelined with a sore shoulder.

== Game conditions and Haddix's cough ==
Life magazine, which featured the game in its June 8, 1959, issue under the title "Best Game Ever Pitched: Harvey Haddix breaks all records with 12 perfect innings--but still loses the game", noted that during the contest "It was warm and muggy, and Haddix was tired. Besides, he had to keep munching cold pills to relieve a heavy cough. But his slider, which pitchers call a 'nickel curve,' was still sharp."

== Aftermath ==
In 1989, during a banquet attended by players from both teams commemorating the game's 30th anniversary, Milwaukee pitcher Bob Buhl told Haddix that the Braves' bullpen had stolen signs from Smoky Burgess, the Pittsburgh catcher, who was exposing them due to a high crouch. From their bullpen, the Braves pitchers repeatedly repositioned a towel to signal for a fastball or a breaking ball, the only two pitches Haddix used in the game. If a fastball was coming, the towel was made visible to the batter; if a breaking pitch was coming, the towel was out of sight. Despite this assistance, the usually solid Milwaukee offense managed only the one hit. All but one Milwaukee hitter, Aaron, took the signals.

Haddix's 12-inning perfect game, in which he struck out eight batters against a team that had just won the previous two National League pennants (including the 1957 World Series championship), and featured one of the top offensive lineups in the Major Leagues, is considered by many to be the best pitching performance in big league history. Pirate second baseman Bill Mazeroski would say, "Usually you have one or two great or spectacular defensive plays in these no-hitters. Not that night. It was the easiest game I ever played in."

In 1991, Major League Baseball changed the definition of a no-hitter to "a game in which a pitcher or pitchers complete a game of nine innings or more without allowing a hit." Under this new definition, Haddix's masterpiece was one of 12 extra-inning no-hitters to be struck from the record books. Haddix's response was, "It's O.K. I know what I did."

Haddix's near-perfect game is immortalized by the Baseball Project, whose song, "Harvey Haddix", appears on their 2008 debut album, Volume 1: Frozen Ropes and Dying Quails.

== Box score ==
Pitcher	IP	H	R	ER	BB	K	HR
Harvey Haddix, L (4–3)	12.2	1	1	0	1	8	0
