= Stan Landes =

American baseball umpire (1923-1994)

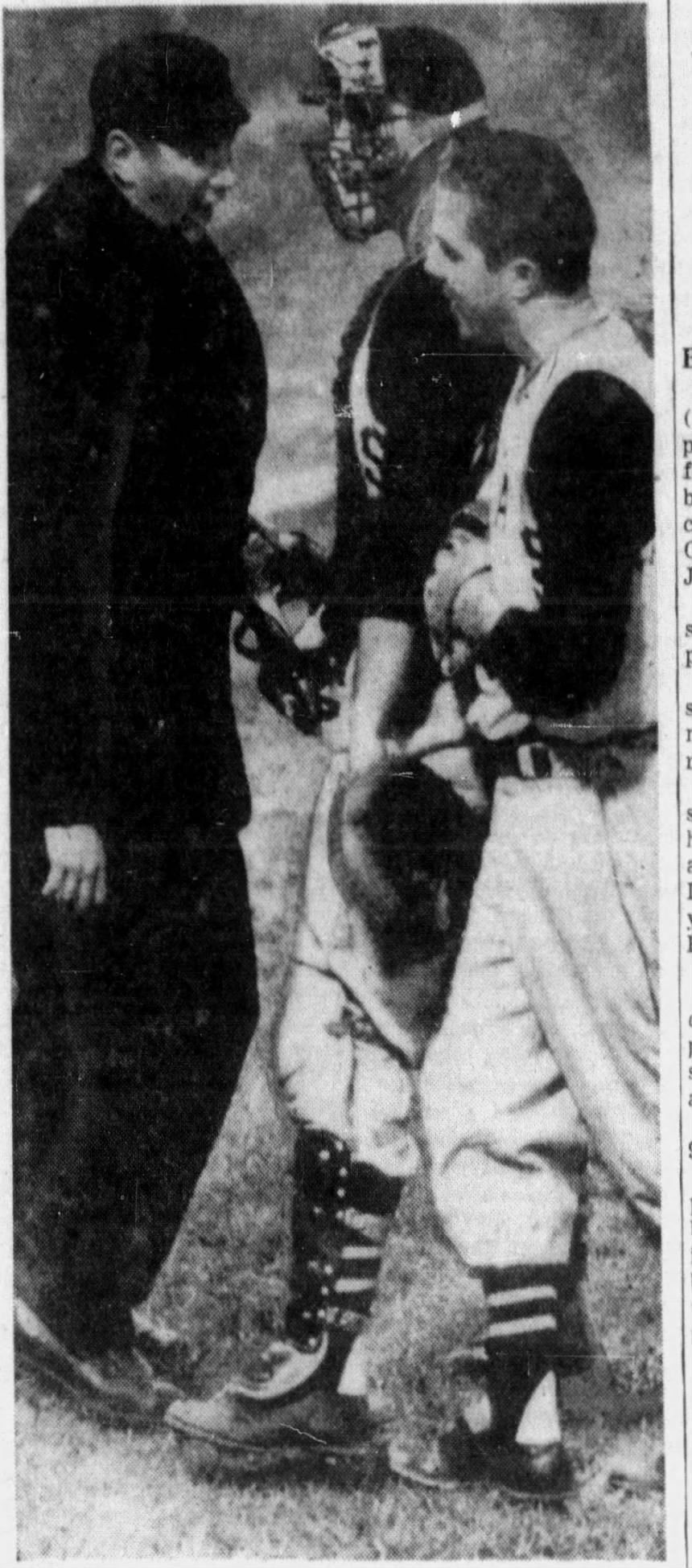
- Landes (left) with Hank Foiles and Bob Friend
- Born: Stanley Albert Landes; December 8, 1923; Bronx, New York, U.S.
- Died: January 23, 1994 (aged 70); Peoria, Arizona, U.S.
- Occupation: Umpire
- Years active: 1955–1972
- Employer: National League

Stanley Albert Landes (December 8, 1923 – January 23, 1994) was an American professional baseball umpire who worked in the National League from 1955 to 1972.

Landes umpired 2,872 major league games in his 18-year career. He umpired in three World Series (1960, 1962 and 1968), one League Championship Series (1970) and three All-Star Games (1957, 1961 and 1972).

== Early life ==
After serving in the United States Marine Corps from 1942 to 1945, Landes pitched in minor league baseball in 1946 and 1947.

== Umpiring career ==
Landes umpired for several seasons in the North Atlantic League, Middle Atlantic League, South Atlantic League and the American Association. He debuted in the National League on April 13, 1955.

Landes was terminated by National League President Chub Feeney in November 1972. Several months later, Landes said that he still had not received a specific explanation for his firing. The day that his termination letter was written, Stan had been outspoken about the mistreatment of umpires at a professional organization meeting. He also speculated that his personal problems may have been contributing factors. Landes had weight problems, was married three times (divorced twice), and passed bad checks owing to a lack of communication from his second wife.

== See also ==
- List of Major League Baseball umpires (disambiguation)
