= Ken Burkhart =

American baseball player (1916–2004)

- Pitcher
- Born: November 18, 1916; Knoxville, Tennessee, U.S.
- Died: December 29, 2004 (aged 88); Knoxville, Tennessee, U.S.
- Batted: Right Threw: Right

MLB debut
- April 21, 1945, for the St. Louis Cardinals

Last MLB appearance
- September 25, 1949, for the Cincinnati Reds

MLB statistics
- Win–loss record: 27–20
- Earned run average: 3.84
- Strikeouts: 181
- Stats at Baseball Reference

Teams
- St. Louis Cardinals (1945–1948); Cincinnati Reds (1948–1949)

Kenneth William Burkhart (born Burkhardt) (November 18, 1916 – December 29, 2004) was an American right-handed pitcher and umpire in Major League Baseball. From 1945 through 1949 he played with the St. Louis Cardinals (1945–48) and Cincinnati Reds (1948–49), and served as a National League umpire from 1957 to 1973.

== Playing career ==
The Knoxville, Tennessee native posted a 27–20 record with 181 strikeouts and a 3.84 earned run average in 519 2/3 innings pitched. He posted an 18–8 mark as a Cardinals rookie in 1945, with 22 starts and 20 relief appearances; his 18 victories and .692 winning percentage each tied him for third in the National League, while his 2.90 ERA ranked him seventh, but an ailing throwing arm ended his season prematurely, and he increasingly worked from the bullpen afterwards. As a pitcher, since he lacked a speedy fastball, he relied on an "oddly breaking knuckleball" for much of his success. On July 26, 1948, Burkhart was traded by St. Louis to the Reds in exchange for first baseman Babe Young. He appeared in 11 games for the Reds in 1949 and retired at the end of the season.

== Umpiring career ==
Following his playing career, Burkhart developed as a well-regarded umpire. He worked in three World Series (1962, 1964 and 1970), serving as crew chief in 1970, and in the 1972 National League Championship Series. He umpired in four All-Star Games (second 1959 game, second 1962 game, 1967 and 1973), and also umpired in no-hitters on consecutive days in 1968 for Gaylord Perry (September 17) and Ray Washburn (September 18). On May 11, 1963 he was umpiring at second base when Sandy Koufax pitched his second no-hitter, and on June 21, 1964 he was at third base when Jim Bunning of the Philadelphia Phillies pitched a 6–0 perfect game against the New York Mets. Burkhart officiated in eight no-hitters overall, then one short of the record for NL umpires, but did not work behind the plate for any of them. He was, however, behind the plate on July 12, 1962 when brothers Tommie and Hank Aaron both hit home runs in the ninth inning to propel the Milwaukee Braves to an 8–6 win, with Hank's grand slam winning the contest.

== Notable games ==
Burkhart was involved in the most controversial play of the 1970 World Series when the Cincinnati Reds were batting against the Baltimore Orioles with one out and the score tied at three in the sixth inning of Game 1. With runners Tommy Helms at first base and Bernie Carbo at third, pinch hitter Ty Cline hit a Baltimore chop off Jim Palmer who, while running towards home plate, immediately signaled to catcher Elrod Hendricks that Carbo was trying to score from third. Hendricks fielded the ball barehanded, spun around to his left and lunged at an oncoming Carbo in an attempt to tag him out, but collided with Burkhart who, while positioning himself to judge whether the batted ball was fair, accidentally blocked the runner's path to the plate. Carbo slid around Burkhart on the outside but missed touching home plate. With his back to the play and after being knocked down, Burkhart ruled Carbo out even though Hendricks made the tag with his mitt while holding the ball in his bare hand. Having not been properly tagged out, Carbo unknowingly stepped on the plate as he was arguing, but the play was dead once Burkhart made his call.

== Later life ==
Burkhart was an inductee into the Tennessee Sports Hall of Fame in 1982.

He died in 2004, as a result of emphysema in Knoxville, at age 88, and was interred in that city's Woodlawn Cemetery. He was the last surviving major league umpire who had also played in the major leagues.

== See also ==
- List of Major League Baseball umpires (disambiguation)
