= Chris Pelekoudas =

American baseball umpire (1918–1984)

- Born: January 23, 1918; Chicago, Illinois, US
- Died: November 30, 1984 (aged 66); Sunnyvale, California, US
- Occupation: Umpire
- Years active: 1960–1975
- Employer: Major League Baseball

Christos George Pelekoudas (January 23, 1918 – November 30, 1984) was an American umpire in Major League Baseball who worked in the National League from 1960 to 1975.

== Early life ==
Born in Chicago into a family of 14 children, Pelekoudas graduated from Crane Tech High School. He had an unsuccessful tryout with the St. Louis Cardinals as a player in 1934.

== Umpiring career ==
Pelekoudas began umpiring while serving as an Army Special Services officer during World War II, and eventually worked his way up to the National League after stops in the Eastern Shore (1948), Interstate (1949), Western (1950–1952) and Pacific Coast Leagues (1953–1959).

Pelekoudas worked in the World Series in 1966 and 1972, serving as crew chief for games in Cincinnati the second time, and in the All-Star Game in 1961 (second game), 1967 and 1975. He also officiated in the National League Championship Series in 1969 and 1973. Pelekoudas umpired in a total of six no-hitters, although was not behind the plate for any of them.

In the 1998 book Baseball's Golden Greeks by Diamantis Zervos, Jim Campanis describes a "Greek moment" in baseball when he was batting against Cincinnati Reds pitcher Milt Pappas, with Alex Grammas the third base coach and Pelekoudas calling balls and strikes behind the plate.

Pelekoudas was forced to retire after the 1975 season, due to then-limits that Major League Baseball had on umpires' ages.

=== Notable games ===
Pelekoudas was the home plate umpire when Willie Mays hit four home runs on April 30, 1961.

He was the third base umpire when Sandy Koufax pitched his second no-hitter on May 11, 1963, and was the first base umpire for Koufax's perfect game on September 9, 1965.

He was the third base umpire for the first game ever held at Shea Stadium, played on April 17, 1964.

Pelekoudas is perhaps best remembered for ordering an apparent Hank Aaron home run nullified on August 18, 1965, because Aaron stepped out of the batter's box when he made contact; the umpire had warned Aaron on the previous two pitches.

== Personal life ==
Pelekoudas married Jane Papangellin on April 28, 1946, and they had a daughter and a son. His brother Perry was also an umpire, working in the minor leagues. His son Lee Pelekoudas worked in the Seattle Mariners organization for 30 years, first as the traveling secretary and lastly as interim general manager.

Pelekoudas, who lived in Sunnyvale, California, for most of his career, died there due to heart failure at age 66, three weeks after suffering a stroke.
