= Fred Green (baseball) =

American baseball player (1933–1996)

- Pitcher
- Born: September 14, 1933; Titusville, New Jersey, U.S.
- Died: December 22, 1996 (aged 63); Titusville, New Jersey, U.S.
- Batted: Right Threw: Left

MLB debut
- April 15, 1959, for the Pittsburgh Pirates

Last MLB appearance
- June 14, 1964, for the Pittsburgh Pirates

MLB statistics
- Win–loss record: 9–7
- Earned run average: 3.48
- Strikeouts: 77
- Stats at Baseball Reference

Teams
- Pittsburgh Pirates (1959–1961); Washington Senators (1962); Pittsburgh Pirates (1964)

Career highlights and awards
- World Series champion (1960)

Fred Allen Green (September 14, 1933 – December 22, 1996) was an American professional baseball player. The left-handed pitcher appeared in 88 games in Major League Baseball, all but one in relief, over all or parts of five seasons (1959–62; 1964) for the Pittsburgh Pirates and Washington Senators. A native and longtime resident of the Titusville section of Hopewell Township, Mercer County, New Jersey, he was listed as 6 feet 4 inches (1.93 m) tall and 190 pounds (86 kg). His son Gary was a shortstop for three MLB teams between 1986 and 1992, and is a former longtime minor league manager.

Fred Green signed with the Pirates in 1952 and advanced through their farm system, missing 1957 to perform military service in the United States Army. After beginning 1959 for the Pirate varsity, then making one appearance in July, Pittsburgh called him up from Triple-A Columbus in August 1959 for an extended stay in the majors. He was largely effective in 13 late-season relief assignments, and made his only MLB start on September 11 against the eventual 1959 world champion Los Angeles Dodgers, dropping a 4–0 decision at Los Angeles Memorial Coliseum.

The following season, 1960, saw Green spend the entire campaign on the Pirates' big-league roster and set career bests in games pitched (45), innings pitched (70), wins (eight), winning percentage (.667), and saves (three), as Pittsburgh won the National League pennant. He also posted a strong 3.21 earned run average. But he was treated harshly by the New York Yankees in the 1960 World Series. In three appearances, all lopsided Pirate losses, Green surrendered 11 hits and ten earned runs in only four full innings of work—an ERA of 22.50. Two of the hits he allowed were home runs to Mickey Mantle. Nonetheless, Pittsburgh won the remaining four games by tight margins to become world champions.

When Green's struggles continued in 1961, he was sent back to Columbus for part of the season, then released on waivers to the Washington Senators. The 1962 Senators used him in five games, then sent him to the minor leagues, where the following season he ended up back in the Pirate organization.

In 1964, Pittsburgh recalled Green from Triple-A in midyear and he was effective in eight relief assignments, allowing only one run in 71/3 innings pitched for a 1.23 earned run average. But he was sent back to Columbus after June 14 and finished his professional career there in 1965.

As a major leaguer, he compiled a 9–7 record and four saves, with a 3.48 earned run average and 77 strikeouts in 1421/3 innings pitched. He allowed 142 hits and 63 bases on balls.

As a hitter, Green batted .176 (3-for-17) but 2 of his major league hits were home runs, both hit during the 1960 season.
