= Frank Secory =

American baseball player and umpire (1912–1995)

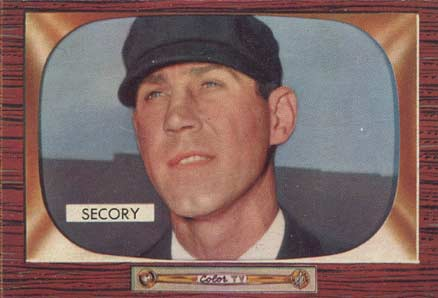
- Left fielder
- Born: August 24, 1912; Mason City, Iowa, U.S.
- Died: April 7, 1995 (aged 82); Port Huron, Michigan, U.S.
- Batted: Right Threw: Right

MLB debut
- April 28, 1940, for the Detroit Tigers

Last MLB appearance
- August 10, 1946, for the Chicago Cubs

MLB statistics
- Batting average: .228
- Home runs: 7
- Runs batted in: 36
- Stats at Baseball Reference

Teams
- Detroit Tigers (1940); Cincinnati Reds (1942); Chicago Cubs (1944–1946)

Frank Edward Secory (August 24, 1912 – April 7, 1995) was an American left fielder and umpire in Major League Baseball who played 186 games from 1940 to 1946 with the Cincinnati Reds, Detroit Tigers, and Chicago Cubs. His best season was 1944, when he batted .321 in 22 games for the Cubs, the team with which he played nearly his entire career. In Game 6 of the 1945 World Series against the Tigers, with the game tied 7–7, he had a pinch-hit single with one out in the 12th inning; a pinch runner, Bill Schuster, later scored on a walk-off double off the bat of Stan Hack to give the Cubs an 8–7 win, sending the Series to a seventh game.

== Early life ==
Secory was born in Mason City, Iowa, and moved in his youth to Michigan; he graduated from Western Michigan College with a Bachelor of Science degree in 1936.

After making his debut with the Tigers, having one at bat in 1940, he was waived by the team and selected by the Reds. His career was sidetracked, however, when he fractured his leg sliding into home on May 10 of the following year while with the Syracuse Chiefs, as he had been expected to shortly be promoted to the Reds. Despite missing three months, he ended the season with a .329 batting average and 15 runs batted in in 31 games. After his major league career ended with the Cubs in 1946, he became an umpire in the West Texas–New Mexico League in 1948 and the Texas League from 1949 to 1951.

== Career ==
Secory was a National League (NL) umpire from 1952 to 1970, and worked in the World Series in 1957, 1959, 1964 and 1969, serving as crew chief in 1964. He also officiated in the All-Star Game in 1955, 1958, 1961 (second game), 1964, 1967 and 1970. He was the second base umpire on May 26, 1959, when Harvey Haddix of the Pittsburgh Pirates pitched a perfect game for 12 innings before allowing a baserunner and losing in the 13th; he was again at second base on June 21, 1964 for Philadelphia Phillies pitcher Jim Bunning's perfect game, the first official regular-season perfect game since 1922. On August 24, 1960, Secory's 48th birthday, while he was umpiring a game at the Los Angeles Coliseum, Los Angeles Dodgers sportscaster Vin Scully unexpectedly invited fans listening to the game radio broadcast at the stadium to yell, "Happy Birthday, Frank!" on the count of three, which startled Secory.

In all, Secory umpired in nine official no-hitters in his career, which set an NL record for umpires and was then one short of the major league record held by Silk O'Loughlin. Secory tied Bob Emslie's NL record of eight no-hitters on May 1, 1969, when he worked second base in Don Wilson's 4–0 gem; after Augie Donatelli also tied the record later that year, Secory broke it by working in his ninth no-hitter on June 12, 1970, officiating at first base in Dock Ellis' 2–0 win. After Secory's retirement, Donatelli tied his record in 1972, and Tom Gorman tied it in 1976 before Paul Pryor broke it upon working in his 10th no-hitter in 1978. Secory was also behind the plate on May 26, 1956, when three Cincinnati Reds pitchers held the Milwaukee Braves hitless for nine innings before losing in the 10th, being the first time in major league history where multiple pitchers combined to throw nine innings without allowing a hit. He was again at second base for the second game of a doubleheader at Shea Stadium on May 31, 1964, between the New York Mets and the San Francisco Giants, when the two teams battled for 23 innings before the Giants won 8–6, setting a record for the longest game ever at 7 hours 23 minutes.

== Personal life ==
Secory married Vonda Conner on February 7, 1938, and they had two children. A resident of Port Huron, Michigan, since the 1940s, Secory died there at age 82.

== See also ==
- List of Major League Baseball umpires (disambiguation)
