= Dusty Boggess =

American baseball umpire (1904-1968)

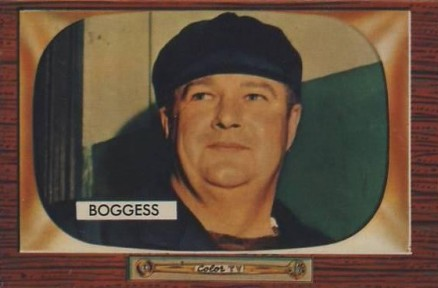
- Born: Lynton Ross Boggess; June 7, 1904; Terrell, Texas, U.S.
- Died: July 8, 1968 (aged 64); Dallas, Texas, U.S.
- Resting place: Sparkman-Hillcrest Memorial Park (Dallas, Texas)
- Occupation: Umpire
- Years active: 1944–1962
- Employer: National League
- Spouse: Manalee Wilmeth

Lynton Ross "Dusty" Boggess (June 7, 1904 – July 8, 1968) was an American umpire in Major League Baseball who worked in the National League from 1944 to 1962. He umpired in four World Series and in four All-Star Games.

== Early life ==
Boggess was born in Terrell, Texas, and attended Waco High School in Waco, Texas. He played pro baseball for a Cleburne, Texas team under the fitting alias of "Bogus" at age 16. He was disqualified from high school competition when this was discovered.

== Minor leagues ==
He enjoyed a minor league playing career through 1933, primarily in the St. Louis Cardinals system. During that time, he played every field position; on three occasions he played every position in a single game. He was also a manager in his last two seasons, and in 1932 he spent his life savings on a minor league team, the Muskogee Chiefs of the Class C Western Association. He operated the team virtually singlehandedly, but the venture failed financially in the midst of the Great Depression.

After the 1933 season he turned to officiating amateur baseball, basketball and football games. His first chance in baseball's minor leagues came in 1939, and he had to hitchhike from Texas to South Dakota to begin work. A bout with high blood pressure in 1943 delayed his entry to the major leagues for a year.

== Major league career ==
After reaching the majors, he officiated in the World Series in 1950, 1952 (outfield only), 1956 and 1960, serving as crew chief for the last; he was the second base umpire for Don Larsen's perfect game in the 1956 Series. He also umpired in the All-Star Game in 1946, 1952, 1955 and 1960 (both games), calling balls and strikes for the second half of the first 1960 game, and in the three-game playoffs to determine the NL champion in 1946, 1959 and 1962. He was the home plate umpire on July 31, 1954, when Joe Adcock hit four home runs and a double, and was the first base umpire for the first of Sandy Koufax' four no-hitters on June 30, 1962. Upon retiring in 1962, he received the first Bill Klem Award from the Houston chapter of the BBWAA as baseball's top umpire.

== Later life ==
Boggess, who also worked as a scout for the Chicago White Sox as well as the NFL's Pittsburgh Steelers, later became a brewery representative. He wrote an autobiography, Kill the Ump!: My 42 Years in Baseball, in which he controversially suggested that the Los Angeles Dodgers had blown the 1962 NL pennant by focusing on Maury Wills' pursuit of the single-season stolen base record. Boggess died of a lung ailment at age 64 in Dallas' Parkland Hospital, and was buried in Dallas' Sparkman-Hillcrest Memorial Park Cemetery with a souvenir baseball he had kept which was autographed by every other umpire with whom he had worked.

== Works ==
Boggess, Dusty; Ernie Helm (1966). Kill the Ump!: My Life in Baseball. Lone Star Brewing Co.

== See also ==
- List of Major League Baseball umpires (disambiguation)
