= Bill Jackowski =

American baseball umpire (1914-1996)

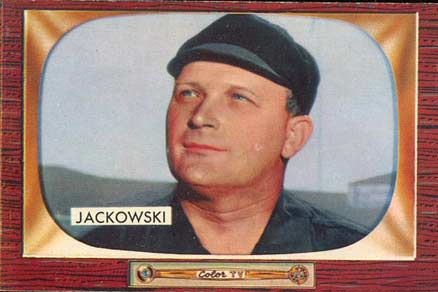
- Born: William Anthony Jackowski; September 27, 1914; North Walpole, New Hampshire, U.S.
- Died: July 29, 1996 (aged 81); Springfield, Vermont, U.S.
- Occupation: Umpire
- Years active: 1952-1968
- Employer: National League

William Anthony Jackowski (September 27, 1914 – July 29, 1996) was an American professional baseball umpire who worked in the National League from 1952 to 1968. Jackowski umpired 2,517 major league games in his 17-year career. He umpired in three World Series (1958, 1960 and 1966) and three All-Star Games (1956, 1959 and 1963).

== Notable games ==
Jackowski worked in six no-hitters during his career and was the home plate umpire for two: Lew Burdette's on August 18, 1960 and Ray Washburn's on September 18, 1968. He also officiated in the last two of Sandy Koufax's four no-hitters, as the first base umpire in Koufax's third no-hitter on June 4, 1964, and the second base umpire in Koufax's perfect game on September 9, 1965.

Jackowski was on the field for the June 30, 1959 St. Louis-Chicago game involving a strange putout of Stan Musial after two baseballs ended up in play at the same time, and was the home plate umpire for one of the most famous games in baseball history—the seventh game of the 1960 World Series on October 13, 1960, which was won 10–9 by the Pittsburgh Pirates over the New York Yankees on Bill Mazeroski's walk-off home run.

== See also ==
- List of Major League Baseball umpires (disambiguation)
