= Don Gross (baseball) =

American baseball player (1931–2017)

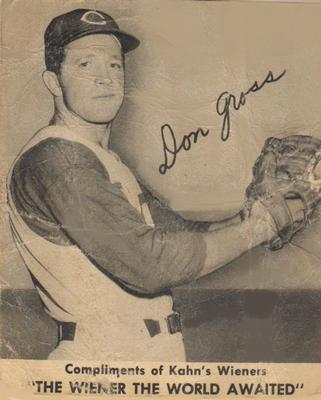
- Pitcher
- Born: June 30, 1931; Weidman, Michigan, U.S.
- Died: August 10, 2017 (aged 86); Mount Pleasant, Michigan, U.S.
- Batted: Left Threw: Left

MLB debut
- July 21, 1955, for the Cincinnati Redlegs

Last MLB appearance
- May 25, 1960, for the Pittsburgh Pirates

MLB statistics
- Win–loss record: 20–22
- Earned run average: 3.73
- Strikeouts: 230
- Stats at Baseball Reference

Teams
- Cincinnati Redlegs (1955–1957); Pittsburgh Pirates (1958–1960)

Donald John Gross (June 30, 1931 – August 10, 2017) was an American baseball player whose 13-year professional career (1950–52; 1954–63) included all or parts of six seasons of Major League Baseball with the Cincinnati Redlegs (1955–57) and Pittsburgh Pirates (1958–60). A left-handed pitcher, Gross stood 5 feet 11 inches (1.80 m) tall and weighed 186 pounds (84 kg). He attended Michigan State University.

Gross was signed by the Cincinnati Reds as an amateur free agent and began his professional career in 1950 in their farm system. His professional career was put on hold in 1953 due to military service. Resuming professional baseball in 1954, he was promoted to the major leagues in 1955 making his debut on July 21 against the Philadelphia Phillies.

Gross appeared in 145 games over his MLB career, including 37 games as a starting pitcher. Overall, he won 20 of 42 decisions (.476), striking out 230 batters and giving up 400 hits in 398 innings of work. His career earned run average was 3.73. He had a stellar record in minor league baseball, compiling a won-lost record of 68–39.

After the 1957 season, Gross was traded to the Pirates for right-handed pitcher Bob Purkey. Gross went 6–8 (3.82) in 66 games for the Pirates, while Purkey went on to become a three-time National League All-Star, winning 103 games for Cincinnati over seven seasons, including a 23–5 (2.81) campaign in 1962.

Gross died August 10, 2017, at 86 years old.
