= Joe Christopher =

American baseball player (1935–2023)

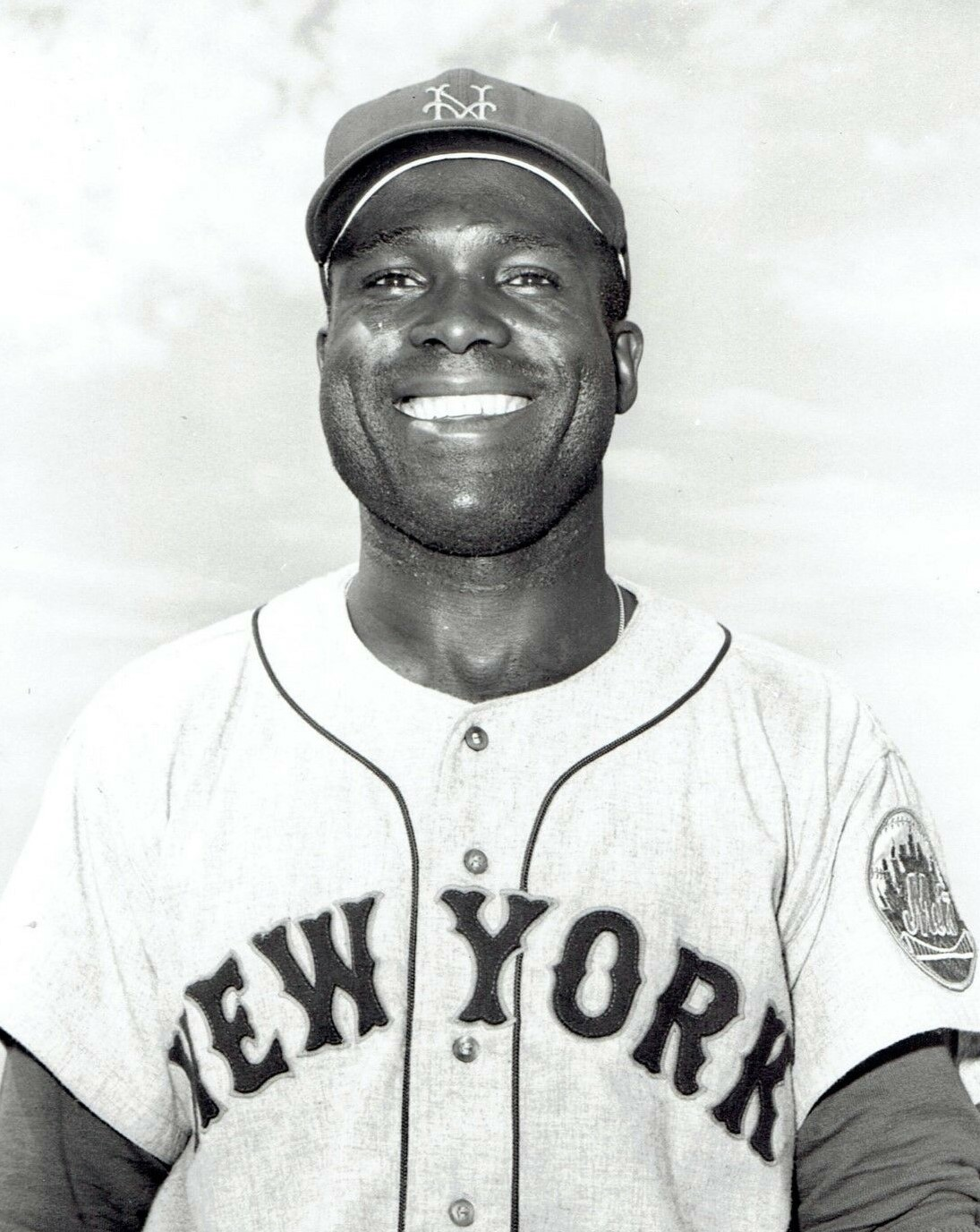
- Christopher in 1964
- Outfielder
- Born: December 13, 1935; Frederiksted, U.S. Virgin Islands
- Died: October 3, 2023 (aged 87); Edgewood, Maryland, U.S.
- Batted: Right Threw: Right

MLB debut
- May 26, 1959, for the Pittsburgh Pirates

Last MLB appearance
- June 9, 1966, for the Boston Red Sox

MLB statistics
- Batting average: .260
- Home runs: 29
- Runs batted in: 224
- Stats at Baseball Reference

Teams
- Pittsburgh Pirates (1959–1961); New York Mets (1962–1965); Boston Red Sox (1966)

Career highlights and awards
- World Series champion (1960)

Joseph O'Neal Christopher (December 13, 1935 – October 3, 2023) was an American professional baseball outfielder who played in Major League Baseball (MLB) for the Pittsburgh Pirates, New York Mets, and Boston Red Sox from 1959 through 1966. He won the 1960 World Series with the Pirates.

== Career ==
Christopher reached the big leagues with the 1959 Pittsburgh Pirates, spending three years there before moving to the New York Mets (1962–65) and Boston Red Sox (1966).

While in Pittsburgh, Christopher was used as a backup in all three outfield positions for Bob Skinner (LF), Bill Virdon (CF), and Roberto Clemente (RF). Christopher was first called up when Clemente was injured, making his debut in Harvey Haddix's near-perfect game, on May 26, 1959. As a member of the 1960 World Series Champion Pirates, Christopher was a utility player, pinch-running in three games and scoring two runs (in games 2 and 5).

The New York Mets selected Christopher from the Pirates with the fifth pick of the 1961 MLB expansion draft. In 1964, he batted .300, with 16 home runs, 76 runs batted in (RBI), 78 runs, 163 hits, 26 doubles, and eight triples, in 154 games — all career-highs. Christopher had a career-best day on August 19, collecting two triples, a double, and a home run in an 8–6 victory over his former Pirates teammates. Then, on September 25, he broke up the no-hit bid of Cincinnati Reds pitcher Jim Maloney at Shea Stadium. Christopher's second-inning single was the only hit against Maloney, who had to settle for a 3–0 shutout.

After the 1965 season, the Mets traded Christopher to the Boston Red Sox for Ed Bressoud. In June 1966, the Red Sox traded Christopher with pitcher Earl Wilson to the Detroit Tigers, who sent Julio Navarro as part of the package. Although Christopher's major league career had come to an end on June 9, 1966 (he never played for Detroit), he stayed active in the minors through 1968. Christopher also played winter baseball in the Dominican Republic, Mexico, and Puerto Rico. During his time in the Puerto Rican Winter League he played for the Senadores de San Juan in 1954–1955, Indios de Mayaguez from 1957 to 1963 and later with the Criollos de Caguas in 1967–1968. During his time in the PRWL he won multiple championships playing with Mayaguez and Caguas. He was also 4-time stolen base leader in the PRWL. An interesting event that occurred during the 1958-1959 Puerto Rican Winter League campaign was Christopher getting beaned in the helmet by a pitch from Ruben "El Divino Loco" Gomez Colon of the Cangrejeros de Santurce causing a near riot by irate Mayaguez fans who overturned Gomez's red corvette after the game and were inconsolable even after Christopher attempted to calm the crowd over the PA system.

In an eight-season MLB career, Christopher was a .260 hitter, with 29 home runs, and 173 RBI, in 638 games, including one five-hit game and eight four-hit games.

== Death ==
Christopher died at his Edgewood, Maryland, home on October 3, 2023, at the age of 87.

== See also ==
- List of players from Virgin Islands in Major League Baseball
