= Frank Dascoli =

American baseball umpire (1913-1990)

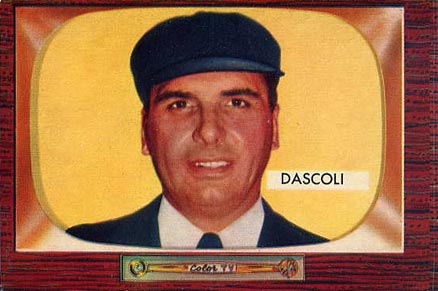
- Born: Frank Dascoli; December 26, 1913; Canterbury, Connecticut, U.S.
- Died: August 11, 1990 (aged 76); Danielson, Connecticut, U.S.
- Occupation: Umpire
- Years active: 1948–1961
- Employer: National League

Frank Dascoli (December 26, 1913 – August 11, 1990) was an American professional baseball umpire who worked in the National League from 1948 to 1961. Dascoli umpired 2,056 major league games in his 14-year career. He umpired in three World Series (1953, 1955 and 1959) and two All-Star Games (1951 and 1957).

== Notable games ==
Dascoli took criticism for his late-season ejection of Roy Campanella during a game in the 1951 pennant race. Campanella had thrown down his mitt in protest of a call involving what would be the winning run. If not for the ejection, Campanella would have come back up to bat late in the game with two runners on base. However, the young Dascoli later received support from veteran umpire Larry Goetz.

On May 6, 1951, Dascoli was home plate umpire for Cliff Chambers' no-hitter. He was also the first-base umpire in Harvey Haddix's near-perfect game on May 26, 1959.

On September 26, 1959, Dascoli halted play due to rain (and then ended the game) after Toothpick Sam Jones pitched seven innings of no-hit baseball against St. Louis.

== Dismissal ==
Dascoli was terminated by league president Warren Giles in the middle of the 1961 season on 10 August. The action came after an interview with Murray Olderman in which Dascoli had criticized the president's lack of support for umpires and threatened to retire after the season. He had called Giles "incompetent and spineless" according to an article in the 25 August 1961 issue of TIME.

== See also ==
- List of Major League Baseball umpires (disambiguation)
