= Vinnie Smith =

American baseball player and umpire (1915–1979)

- Catcher / Umpire
- Born: December 7, 1915; Richmond, Virginia, U.S.
- Died: December 14, 1979 (aged 64); Virginia Beach, Virginia, U.S.
- Batted: Right Threw: Right

MLB debut
- September 10, 1941, for the Pittsburgh Pirates

Last MLB appearance
- April 27, 1946, for the Pittsburgh Pirates

MLB statistics
- Batting average: .259
- Hits: 14
- Runs batted in: 5
- Stats at Baseball Reference

Teams
- Pittsburgh Pirates (1941, 1946)

Vincent Ambrose Smith (December 7, 1915 – December 14, 1979) was an American Major League Baseball player and umpire from Richmond, Virginia. During his playing days, the 6 ft 1 in (1.85 m), 176 lb (80 kg) Smith threw and batted right-handed.

== Career ==
Smith's playing career began at the Class D level of minor league baseball in 1938. He made his Major League debut for the Pittsburgh Pirates on September 10, 1941, and appeared in nine games as a catcher. With the outbreak of World War II, he was drafted into the US Navy eventually serving in the Pacific Theater of Operations as a chief petty officer. During his war-time service from 1942 to 1945, he participated in several charity all-star games. After the war he returned to the Pirates in 1946 and played in seven additional games as a catcher.

In his 16 MLB games played, Smith collected 14 hits, with one double; he had five runs batted in. Following 1946, he remained in minor league baseball as a catcher and player-manager through 1953.

In Smith's later playing days, he was introduced to the umpiring profession. "While in his final playing season in the minors, the umpires failed to show up for a game due to transportation issues. Players were forced to fill in, and Smith was placed behind the plate. He enjoyed it and stuck with it, and he eventually returned to the majors in that role in 1957." He began umpiring in the 1954 season in the California League working his way to become a National League umpire from 1957 to 1965. He was the home plate umpire on May 26, 1959, when Harvey Haddix threw 12 perfect innings against the Milwaukee Braves, but lost the game in the 13th inning. Perhaps his biggest moments came as an umpire in the 1964 World Series between the New York Yankees and St. Louis Cardinals... where he took a turn behind the plate in one of Bob Gibson's starts. He also was a fixture in the umpiring crews at Forbes Field - where he enjoyed a contentious relationship on the field with the great Roberto Clemente. Smith ejected Clemente on a 3rd base sliding out call, that sent Roberto into a tizzy... the picture was published in Life Magazine.

== Death ==
Smith died in Virginia Beach, Virginia, on December 14, 1979.
