= 1960 in baseball =

The following are the baseball events of the year 1960 throughout the world.

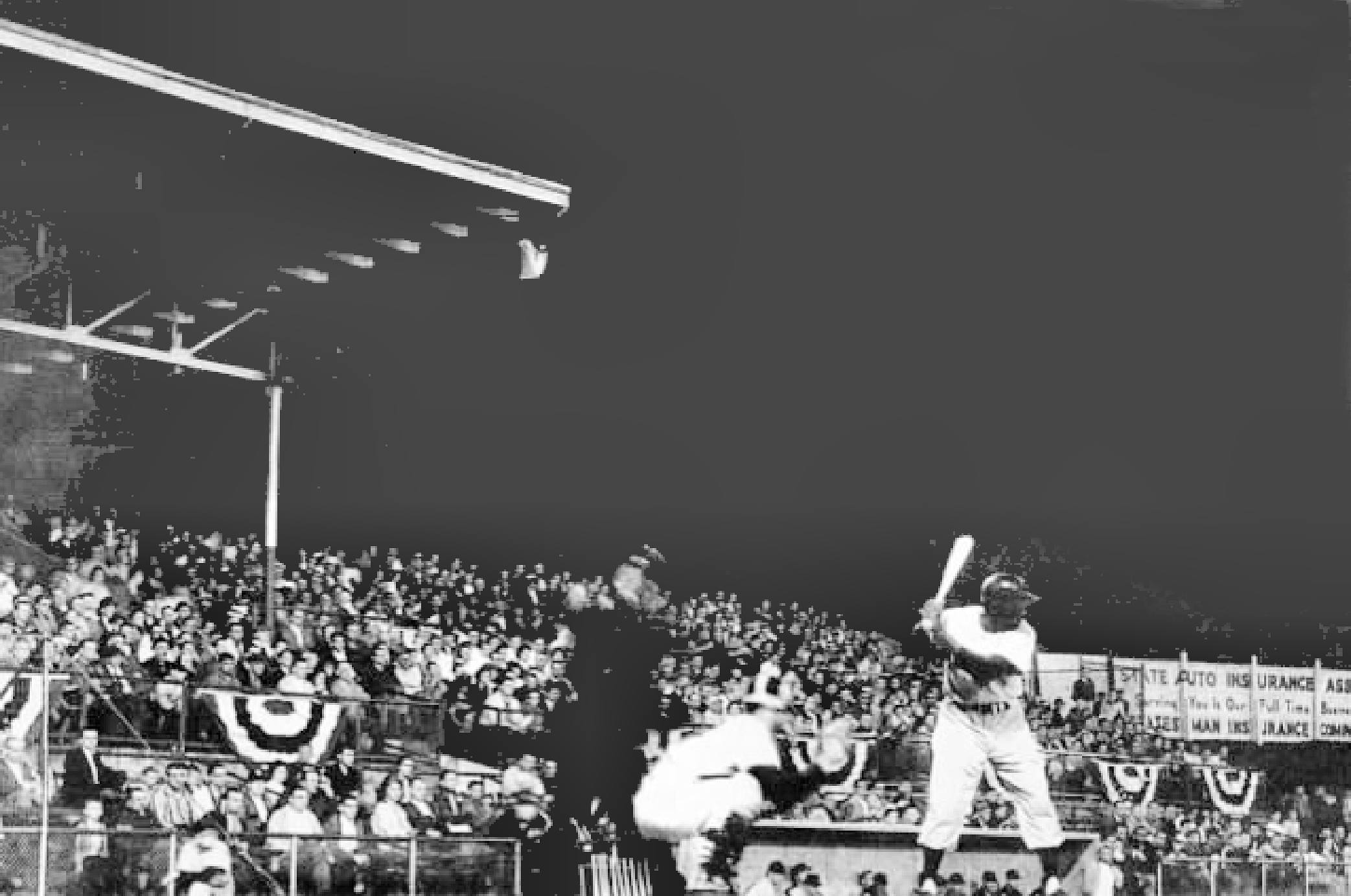
Allentown Red Sox' Opening Day at Breadon Field, 1960

== Champions ==
=== Major League Baseball ===
- World Series: Pittsburgh Pirates over New York Yankees (4–3); Bobby Richardson, MVP
- All-Star Game (#1), July 11 at Municipal Stadium: National League, 5–3
- All-Star Game (#2), July 13 at Yankee Stadium: National League, 6–0

=== Other champions ===
- College World Series: Minnesota
- Japan Series: Taiyō Whales over Daimai Orions (4–0)
- Little League World Series: American, Levittown, Pennsylvania

Winter Leagues

- 1960 Caribbean Series: Elefantes de Cienfuegos
- Cuban League: Elefantes de Cienfuegos
- Dominican Republic League: Leones del Escogido
- Mexican Pacific League: Ostioneros de Guaymas
- Panamanian League: Marlboro BBC
- Puerto Rican League: Criollos de Caguas
- Venezuelan Western League: Rapiños de Occidente

== Awards and honors ==
Baseball Writers' Association of America Awards
BBWAA Award	National League	American League
Rookie of the Year	Frank Howard (LAD)	Ron Hansen (BAL)
Cy Young Award	Vern Law (PIT)	—
Most Valuable Player	Dick Groat (PIT)	Roger Maris (NYY)
Gold Glove Awards
Position	National League	American League
Pitcher	Harvey Haddix (PIT)	Bobby Shantz (NYY)
Catcher	Del Crandall (MIL)	Earl Battey (WSH)
1st Base	Bill White (STL)	Vic Power (CLE)
2nd Base	Bill Mazeroski (PIT)	Nellie Fox (CWS)
3rd Base	Ken Boyer (STL)	Brooks Robinson (BAL)
Shortstop	Ernie Banks (CHC)	Luis Aparicio (CWS)
Left field	Wally Moon (LAD)	Minnie Miñoso (CWS)
Center field	Willie Mays (SF)	Jim Landis (CWS)
Right field	Hank Aaron (MIL)	Roger Maris (NYY)

== Statistical leaders ==
	American League		National League	
Stat	Player	Total	Player	Total
AVG	Pete Runnels (BOS)	.320	Dick Groat (PIT)	.325
HR	Mickey Mantle (NYY)	40	Ernie Banks (CHC)	41
RBI	Roger Maris (NYY)	112	Hank Aaron (MIL)	126
W	Chuck Estrada (BAL); Jim Perry (CLE)	18	Ernie Broglio (STL); Warren Spahn (MIL)	21
ERA	Frank Baumann (CWS)	2.67	Mike McCormick (SF)	2.70
K	Jim Bunning (DET)	201	Don Drysdale (LAD)	246

== Major league baseball final standings ==
=== American League final standings ===
American League
Team	W	L	Pct.	GB	Home	Road
New York Yankees	97	57	.630	—	55‍–‍22	42‍–‍35
Baltimore Orioles	89	65	.578	8	44‍–‍33	45‍–‍32
Chicago White Sox	87	67	.565	10	51‍–‍26	36‍–‍41
Cleveland Indians	76	78	.494	21	39‍–‍38	37‍–‍40
Washington Senators	73	81	.474	24	32‍–‍45	41‍–‍36
Detroit Tigers	71	83	.461	26	40‍–‍37	31‍–‍46
Boston Red Sox	65	89	.422	32	36‍–‍41	29‍–‍48
Kansas City Athletics	58	96	.377	39	34‍–‍43	24‍–‍53

Locations of teams for the 1955–1960 American League seasons
American League

=== National League final standings ===
National League
Team	W	L	Pct.	GB	Home	Road
Pittsburgh Pirates	95	59	.617	—	52‍–‍25	43‍–‍34
Milwaukee Braves	88	66	.571	7	51‍–‍26	37‍–‍40
St. Louis Cardinals	86	68	.558	9	51‍–‍26	35‍–‍42
Los Angeles Dodgers	82	72	.532	13	42‍–‍35	40‍–‍37
San Francisco Giants	79	75	.513	16	45‍–‍32	34‍–‍43
Cincinnati Reds	67	87	.435	28	37‍–‍40	30‍–‍47
Chicago Cubs	60	94	.390	35	33‍–‍44	27‍–‍50
Philadelphia Phillies	59	95	.383	36	31‍–‍46	28‍–‍49

Locations of teams for the 1960–1961 National League seasons
National League

== Nippon Professional Baseball final standings ==
=== Central League final standings ===
Central League	G	W	L	T	Pct.	GB
Taiyo Whales	130	70	56	4	.554	—
Yomiuri Giants	130	66	61	3	.519	4.5
Osaka Tigers	130	64	62	4	.508	6.0
Hiroshima Carp	130	62	61	7	.504	6.5
Chunichi Dragons	130	63	67	0	.485	9.0
Kokutetsu Swallows	130	54	72	4	.431	16.0

=== Pacific League final standings ===
Pacific League	G	W	L	T	Pct.	GB
Daimai Orions	133	82	48	3	.631	—
Nankai Hawks	136	78	52	6	.600	4.0
Nishitetsu Lions	136	70	60	6	.538	12.0
Hankyu Braves	136	65	65	6	.500	17.0
Toei Flyers	132	52	78	2	.400	30.0
Kintetsu Buffaloes	131	43	87	1	.331	39.0

== Events ==
=== January ===
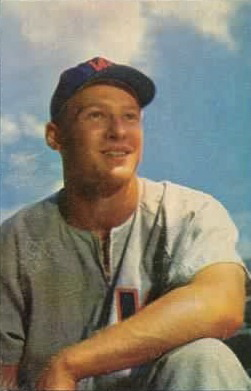
Jackie Jensen in 1953

- January 5 – The Continental League—the proposed third major league in North American professional baseball—gets an assurance of Congressional support from U.S. Senator Kenneth Keating, a New York Republican, who offers to serve as "an informal mediator, day or night" on behalf of the start-up circuit.
- January 11 – Centerfielder Richie Ashburn, the "heart and soul" of the Philadelphia Phillies for a dozen seasons, is traded to the Chicago Cubs for pitcher John Buzhardt, shortstop Alvin Dark and third baseman Jim Woods. Three years later, he will return as a member of the Phillies' broadcasting team and remain until his death in 1997.
- January 26 – Reigning American League runs batted in champion and 1958 MVP Jackie Jensen, 32, announces his retirement from the Boston Red Sox because of airplane flight phobia. Jensen is a three-time All-Star as well as a three-time RBI champ (1955 and 1958, in addition to 1959), and the incumbent Gold Glove Award-winning rightfielder for the Junior Circuit. He will sit out the 1960 season, return to the Red Sox with diminished skills in 1961, then retire for good.
- January 29 – The Continental League grants its eighth and final franchise to Buffalo. For the Western New York metropolis, the proposed 1961 debut of the CL would restore Major League Baseball to the city for the first time since 1915, when the Buffalo Blues and the upstart Federal League disbanded.

=== February ===
- February 4 – For the second straight election, the BBWAA voters fail to elect a new member to the Baseball Hall of Fame. Edd Roush gets 146 votes, but 202 are necessary for election. Sam Rice (143) and Eppa Rixey (142) are next in line.
- February 15 – In the 1960 Caribbean Series, the Elefantes de Cienfuegos complete a 6–0 sweep and give Cuba's representative the championship for the fifth straight year. Camilo Pascual, who went 2–0 with 15 strikeouts including a one-hit shutout in the clincher, is named Most Valuable Player. It's Cuba's seventh title in the Series' 12-year history. This year's competition will be the last Caribbean Series until 1970, after Commissioner of Baseball Ford Frick bans major-leaguers from playing in Cuba, and Fidel Castro abolishes the Cuban Winter League and all professional sports on the island.
- February 18 – Walter O'Malley, owner of the Los Angeles Dodgers, finalizes the purchase of the Chavez Ravine area in Los Angeles by paying $494,000 for property valued at $92,000.
- February 20 – Branch Rickey meets with officials of the proposed Class D Western Carolinas League about pooling talent for Continental League clubs.

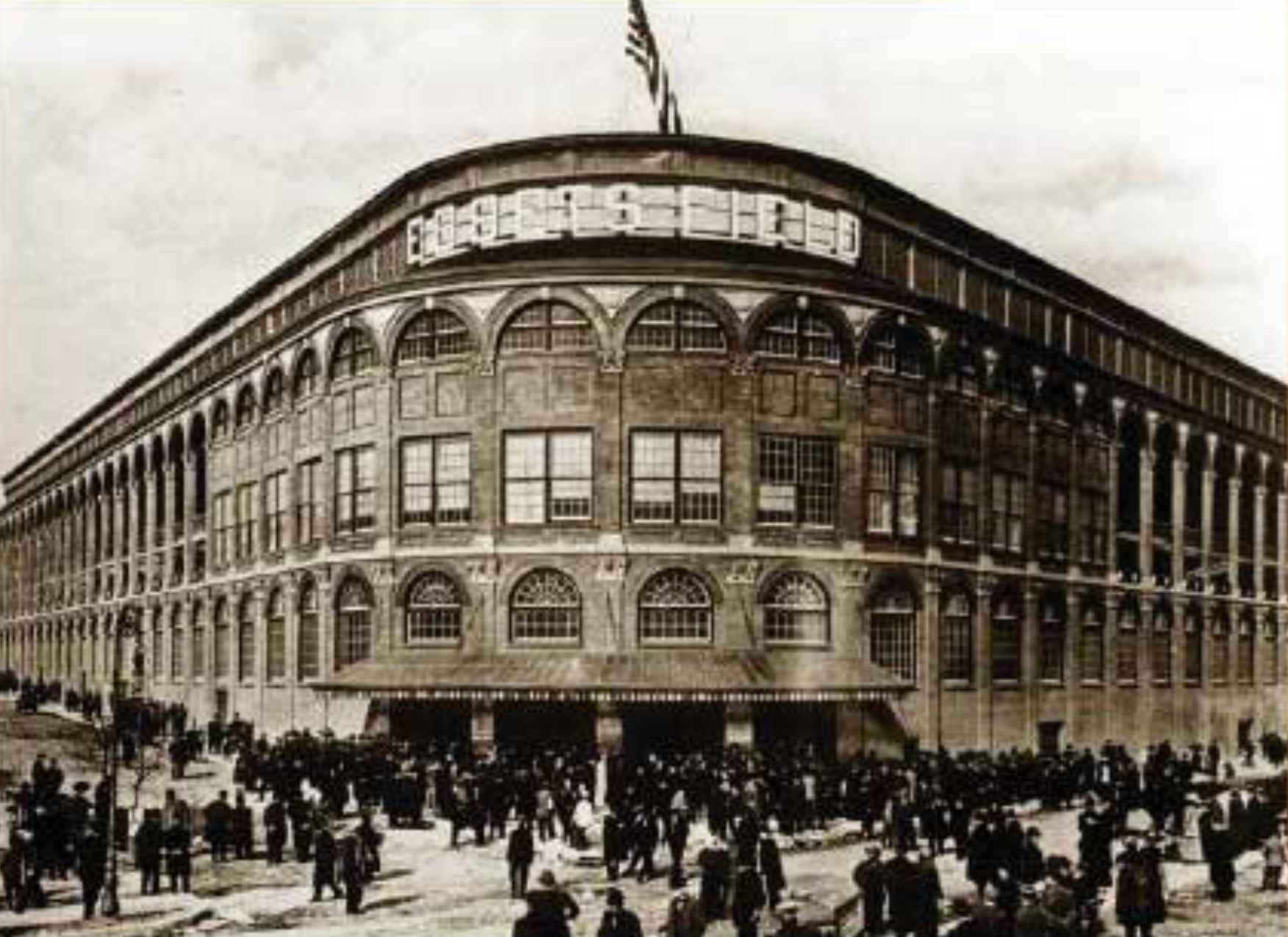
Brooklyn's brand-new Ebbets Field in 1913.

- February 23 – Demolition of Ebbets Field begins. Lucy Monroe sings the National Anthem, and Roy Campanella is given an urn of dirt from behind home plate.
- February 24 – Major League Baseball and NBC announce an extension of their contract allowing the network to telecast the All-Star Game and World Series through the 1966 campaign. NBC will pay $4 million for the broadcast rights, with Gillette remaining the primary sponsor.
- February 27 – The New York Yankees and superstar Mickey Mantle are locked in a contract impasse as the reporting date for spring training approaches. The Bombers, who finished third in the American League in 1959, want to cut Mantle's 1959 salary by 17.3% to $62,000. Outfielder Roger Maris, acquired in December from the Kansas City Athletics, is also unsigned.

=== March ===
- March 1 – At the Boston Red Sox' training camp in Arizona, 41-year-old Ted Williams tells reporters "there's considerable doubt" that he will play again. The hitting legend is still suffering from chronic neck pain; he had been treated for a pinched nerve during 1959, when an injury-plagued Williams batted a career-low .254 in 103 games.
- March 12 – The Cincinnati Reds sign Cuban prospect Tony Pérez, 17, as an amateur free agent. Pérez will go on to be a seven time All-star, a leader of the Big Red Machine of the 1970s, and (in 2000) a member of the Baseball Hall of Fame.
- March 13 – The Chicago White Sox unveil new road uniforms with the players' names above the number on the back, another innovation by Sox owner Bill Veeck.
- March 15 – Victims of the ongoing attendance crisis plaguing minor league baseball, the New Orleans Pelicans, members of the Double-A Southern Association since 1901, disband after drawing only 71,577 fans during 1959. The Pelican franchise—which won nine SA championships over 59 seasons, but none since 1934—will move to Little Rock after businessmen there raise an initial $25,000 to re-enter the league in time for the season to come.
- March 16 – In the midst of spring training, the Cleveland Indians trade catcher Russ Nixon to the Boston Red Sox for former All-Star catcher Sammy White and first baseman Jim Marshall. On March 25, White—who has opened a bowling alley in Boston—announces his retirement at age 32, cancelling the trade.
- March 24 – Commissioner Ford Frick says he will not allow the Continental League to pool players in the Western Carolinas League because it would violate existing major-minor league agreements.
- March 26 – A Baltimore Orioles–Cincinnati Reds series scheduled for Havana, is moved to Miami by Baltimore club president Lee MacPhail. The Reds, with a farm club in Cuba, want the trip, but the Orioles fear increased political unrest in the area. Thirty-nine years later, in March 1999, the Orioles will attempt to thaw the 39-year-old estrangement between Cuba and MLB by playing an exhibition game in Havana against the Cuban national team.
- March 31 – By a vote of 8–1, the Professional Baseball Rules Committee turns down a Pacific Coast League proposal to use a designated hitter for the pitcher.

=== April ===
- April 1 – The Cincinnati Reds and New York Yankees agree to a four-player trade that features three "players to be named later." In it, the Reds deal catcher Jesse Gonder and pitchers Luis Arroyo (PTBNL, added to the deal July 20) and Ted Wieand (PTBNL) to New York for pitcher Zach Monroe (PTBNL) and cash. The trade is significant because southpaw Arroyo, 33, will develop into the Yankees' bullpen ace in 1961, going 15–5 (2.19) with a league-leading 29 saves in 65 games pitched during the regular season, and capture a victory in Game 3 of the 1961 World Series (against the Reds), a Fall Classic that Arroyo's Yankees will win in five games.
- April 3–4 – The Washington Senators make two trades on back-to-back days. On April 3, they deal lefthanded-hitting catcher Clint Courtney and infielder Ron Samford to the Baltimore Orioles for second baseman Billy Gardner. Then, on the fourth, they send four-time AL All-Star first baseman Roy Sievers to the Chicago White Sox for catcher Earl Battey, first baseman Don Mincher and $150,000.
- April 5 – The San Francisco Giants purchase first baseman Dale Long from the Chicago Cubs.
- April 6 – The Continental League franchise that will eventually become the National League's New York Mets names stockbroker M. Donald Grant club president, and minority owners George Herbert Walker Jr. and Dwight Davis Jr. vice presidents and members of its board of directors. Grant, 55, represents the interests of majority stockholder Joan Whitney Payson; Walker, 54, is the uncle of future U.S. President George H. W. Bush. A longtime minor-league executive, Charles Hurth, is appointed the as-yet-unnamed club's first general manager.
- April 8 – The Los Angeles Dodgers deal veteran infielder Don Zimmer to the Chicago Cubs for left-hander Ron Perranoski, infielder Johnny Goryl and minor-league outfielder Lee Handley. Perranoski, then hurling in Triple-A, will debut with the Dodgers in 1961 and become a leading member of their bullpen through 1967.

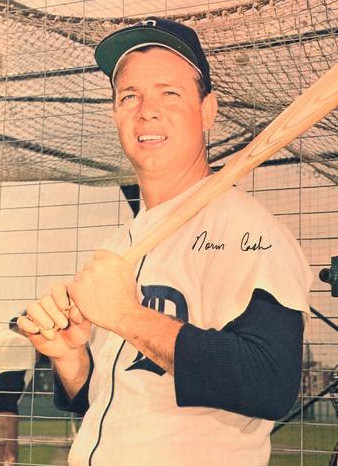
Norm Cash in 1966

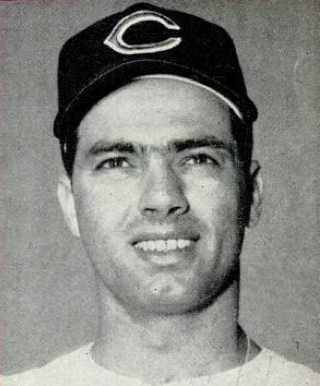
Rocky Colavito in 1959

- April 12:
  - In the National League's traditional Opening Day contest, the homestanding Cincinnati Reds defeat the rebuilding Philadelphia Phillies, 9–4. Following the game, veteran Phillies manager Eddie Sawyer resigns, saying, "I'm 49 years old, and I want to live to be fifty." After coach Andy Cohen handles the Phils for one game on April 14, Gene Mauch, skipper of the Boston Red Sox' top farm club in Minneapolis, gets the Phillies' permanent job on April 16. At 34, Mauch becomes the youngest manager in the majors.
  - With 42,269 fans in attendance, the San Francisco Giants edge the St. Louis Cardinals, 3–1, in the first game at San Francisco's Candlestick Park. Sam Jones pitches a three-hitter, and Cardinals outfielder Leon Wagner hits the first home run in the $15 million stadium.
  - Chuck Essegian belts an 11th-inning pinch-hit home run as the Los Angeles Dodgers beat the Chicago Cubs, 3–2, before a record Opening Day crowd (67,550) at Los Angeles. The home run is Essegian's third straight as a pinch hitter, including two in the 1959 World Series. Don Drysdale pitches all the way, striking out 14, for the win over Don Elston.
  - In a deal that will haunt the Cleveland Indians, general manager Frank Lane sends Norm Cash to the Detroit Tigers for third baseman Steve Demeter. Cash will be Detroit's regular first baseman for the next 14 years and will hit 373 home runs for them. Demeter will play four games for Cleveland.
- April 17:
  - On Easter Sunday, GM Frank Lane brings AL batting champ Harvey Kuenn to the Cleveland Indians and sends co-home run champ Rocky Colavito to the Detroit Tigers. Colavito, an unparalleled fan favorite in Cleveland, will hit 173 home runs before being traded back to the Indians in 1965. Kuenn will pull a muscle and never be the same hitter. The Indians will trade him after one season.
  - Eddie Mathews of the Milwaukee Braves hits his 300th home run, plus a double and a triple, as Milwaukee beats the Philadelphia Phillies, 8–4. To date, only Jimmie Foxx has hit his 300th at a younger age.
- April 18:
  - In the American League opener at Washington, D.C., a week later than the National League start, President Dwight D. Eisenhower throws out the first ball, then watches the Senators' Camilo Pascual strike out 15 Boston Red Sox batters to tie Walter Johnson's team record. Boston's only run in a 10–1 loss is a Ted Williams home run, which makes Williams the first player to hit a home run in four different decades.
  - Trader Frank Lane continues to swap, sending Cleveland favorite Herb Score to the Chicago White Sox for Barry Latman. Score and Rocky Colavito, traded three days before, are the last two players to pre-date Lane's arrival in Cleveland.
  - Angered by "Organized Baseball's" mounting opposition to recognizing the start-up Continental League, CL president Branch Rickey avers that his league will "raid" MLB rosters for playing talent if necessary. If the CL is forced to operate "outside the canopy of the procedures of baseball," he says, "we will sign [players] [from] anywhere." Rickey had previously advocated cooperating with "organized ball".
- April 19:
  - Before a home crowd of 41,661, Minnie Miñoso celebrates his return to the Chicago White Sox with a fourth-inning grand slam against the Kansas City Athletics. Leading off the bottom of the ninth with the score tied 9–9, Miñoso (who, coincidentally, wears uniform #9) hits a solo homer for his sixth RBI to win the game.
  - On Patriot's Day at Fenway Park, Roger Maris makes his debut with the New York Yankees as he goes 4-for-5, including two home runs with four RBI. The Yankees spoil the Boston Red Sox opener with an 8–4 win.
  - The Detroit Tigers and Cleveland Indians play the longest season opener in major-league history, a 15-inning affair won by the Tigers 4–2 at Cleveland Stadium.
- April 23 – The Chicago White Sox release veteran and fan favorite Alfonso "Chico" Carrasquel, who'd returned to the Pale Hose as a free agent on January 9. The 34-year-old Venezuelan, who made four AL All-Star teams during his 1950–1955 tenure on the South Side, is released without playing in a single 1960 game. He'll hook on with the Triple-A Montreal Royals for 35 games this year, his last in "Organized Baseball".
- April 24 – The New York Yankees score eight runs against the Baltimore Orioles in the bottom half of the first before the first out is recorded. Though the Orioles stage a comeback thanks in part to two grand slams, in the eighth inning by Albie Pearson and in the ninth by Billy Klaus, the Yankees hold on for a 15–9 home win.
- April 29 – At home, the St. Louis Cardinals crush the Chicago Cubs, 16–6. Stan Musial plays his 1,000th game at first base, becoming the first major league player ever with that many at two positions (1,513 games in the outfield). A bright spot for the Cubs is Ernie Banks hitting two home runs to break Gabby Hartnett's club record of 231 homers.

=== May ===
- May 1 – Skinny Brown of the Baltimore Orioles pitches a 4–1 win over the Yankees. Brown allows just one hit, a first-inning home run by Mickey Mantle. Rookie Ron Hansen matches Mantle to up his RBI total to an American League high 32.
- May 4:
  - The Chicago Cubs make a "trade" with flagship radio station WGN (AM), plucking Lou Boudreau out of the broadcast booth to replace Charlie Grimm (6–11) as Cubs manager. "Jolly Cholly" replaces Boudreau behind the mike. The Cubs win, 5–1, over the Pirates as pitcher Dick Ellsworth gains his first ML victory.
  - Orioles catcher Gus Triandos sets a pair of American League records with three passed balls in one inning (the sixth) and four in one game in Hoyt Wilhelm's rare starting assignment, goes seven innings, and the knuckleballer gets credit for a 6–4 Baltimore win over the Chicago White Sox. Early Wynn records his 2,000th strikeout in a no-decision effort for Chicago. Triandos' PB mark for an inning will be tied by Baltimore's reserve backstop Myron "Joe" Ginsberg in six days, and Tom Egan will collect five PBs in 1970 to erase Triandos' name from the top of the list.
- May 7:
  - Takehiko Bessho becomes the winningest pitcher in Nippon Professional Baseball as his Tokyo Giants beat the Hanshin Tigers 6–3. Bessho has 302 wins in the league, one more than Victor Starfin.
  - Pitcher Larry Sherry and catcher Norm Sherry of the Los Angeles Dodgers become the tenth sibling battery in MLB history. Norman belts an 11th-inning home run to give his reliever brother Larry a 3–2 win against the Phillies.
  - Boston Red Sox pitcher Bill Monbouquette allows just one hit in beating the visiting Detroit Tigers, 5–0. Ex-Bosox farmhand Neil Chrisley's first-inning double is the only Detroit safety.
  - The Dodgers send veteran outfielder Sandy Amorós, a hero of Game 7 of the 1955 World Series, to the Detroit Tigers for first baseman Gail Harris.
- May 10:
  - Catcher Joe Ginsberg of the Orioles loses his struggle with Hoyt Wilhelm's knuckleball in a contest against the Kansas City Athletics, and ties the record set six days earlier by teammate Gus Triandos by committing three passed balls in one inning.
  - Grand slams by Boston Red Sox teammates Vic Wertz and Rip Repulski at Fenway Park give Boston a 9–7 win over the Chicago White Sox. A National League veteran, Repulski's eighth-inning shot off Don Ferrarese comes on his first American League at bat.
- May 11 – Sam Jones pitches a two-hitter and draws a bases-loaded walk for the only run, as the Giants edge the visiting Philadelphia Phillies, 1–0. Jim Owens is the loser.
- May 12 – Duplicating Sam Jones' effort of yesterday, the Giants' Jack Sanford fires a two-hit, 1–0 win over the Phillies. Sanford matches Jones by striking out 11 and walking three.
- May 13:
  - Dick Groat of the Pittsburgh Pirates goes six-for-six (including three doubles)—the first National League player since Connie Ryan in 1953 to perform the feat—as Pittsburgh downs the Milwaukee Braves, 8–2.
  - Mike McCormick's six-hit, 3–0 shutout of the Los Angeles Dodgers is the third straight by San Francisco Giants pitchers, following the pair of two-hitters by Sam Jones and Jack Sanford. The first-place Giants have seven straight wins.
  - The Philadelphia Phillies suffer their third straight 1–0 shutout, losing to the host Cincinnati Reds. The Phillies, losers of back-to-back 1–0 games in San Francisco, tie the major-league record for straight 1–0 losses. Jim O'Toole's win is Cincinnati's ninth straight.
  - The Phillies trade first baseman Ed Bouchee and pitcher Don Cardwell to the Chicago Cubs for second baseman Tony Taylor and catcher Cal Neeman.

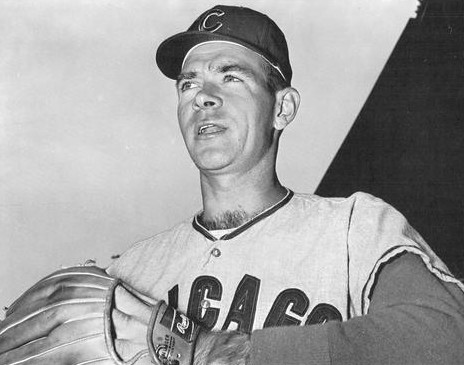
Don Cardwell

- May 15:
  - In his first start as a Chicago Cub, two days after being acquired, Don Cardwell pitches a no-hitter against the St. Louis Cardinals. Two brilliant, ninth-inning catches by Cub outfielders—right-fielder George Altman off Carl Sawatski, and left-fielder Walt Moryn off Joe Cunningham, the final batter of the contest—preserve Cardwell's gem. Ernie Banks' home run paces the 4–0 win, the first no-hitter against the Cards since May 11, 1919.
  - Pinch hitter Pete Whisenant appears in a Cleveland Indians game minutes after he has been traded to the Washington Senators. Cleveland manager Joe Gordon apparently is unaware of the transaction, but the opposing skipper, Al López of the Chicago White Sox, learns of the infraction and plays the game under protest.
  - Five batters are hit by pitches—three in the same half inning—in the Philadelphia Phillies' 14–3 rout of the Cincinnati Reds at Crosley Field. In the visitors' eighth, with Philadelphia leading 9–1, Phillies Cal Neeman, Ted Lepcio and Gene Conley are all hit by Cincinnati reliever Raúl Sánchez in the midst of a four-run rally. Phillies' manager Gene Mauch charges the mound, a brawl ensues, and benches are cleared, according to a wire-service account of the game, but the official box score lists no ejections from the incident.
- May 17:
  - Carl Furillo is released by the Los Angeles Dodgers. A two-time All-Star, Furillo, 38, has been a Dodger since 1946, and his clutch, 12th-inning infield single had delivered the pennant-winning run in Game 2 of the 1959 National League tie-breaker series just the previous season. His release leaves only two 1960 Dodgers—Gil Hodges and Duke Snider—who were teammates of Jackie Robinson during Robinson's rookie 1947 season still on the club's roster.
  - The Boston Red Sox trade first baseman Ron Jackson to the Milwaukee Braves for 36-year-old infielder Ray Boone. The towering Jackson, 26, acquired by Boston over the winter to provide much-needed right-handed power, manages only five singles and two doubles in 32 at-bats in a Bosox uniform.
- May 19 – The New York Yankees send third baseman Andy Carey to the Kansas City Athletics for outfielder Bob Cerv. Cerv had been with the Yankees for five years before going to Kansas City, where he hit 38 home runs in 1958 and was chosen as the American League left fielder in the All-Star game over Ted Williams. Cerv will be claimed in the 1960 expansion draft and the Yankees will again reacquire him.
- May 20 – The St. Louis Cardinals sign free-agent southpaw Curt Simmons, 31, who had been released by the Philadelphia Phillies three days earlier. Simmons will recover from arm miseries to win 33 games for the 1963–1964 Redbirds, and earn a 1964 World Series ring.

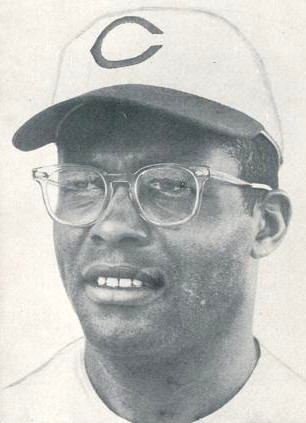
George Crowe in 1958

- May 25 – George Crowe of the Cardinals sets a major league record with his 11th pinch-hit home run. The blow comes off Don McMahon in a 5–3 Redbird win over the Milwaukee Braves. Crowe began the season tied with Smoky Burgess and Gus Zernial in most career pinch home runs.
- May 27:
  - Since there is no rule limiting the size or shape of the catcher's mitt, Baltimore Orioles manager Paul Richards combats the team's passed-ball problem while catching Hoyt Wilhelm (38 in 1959; 11 so far this year) by devising an oversized mitt to gather in Wilhelm's fluttering knuckleball. The mitt—45 inches (1.1 m) in circumference—is half again larger and 40 ounces (1,100 g) heavier than the standard version. Wilhelm goes the distance in beating New York, 3–2, at Yankee Stadium. Catcher Clint Courtney has no passed balls behind the plate.
  - Camilo Pascual strikes out 13 but the Washington Senators lose to the Boston Red Sox, 4–3, his third loss to Boston this year.
- May 28:
  - Manager Casey Stengel, 69, is hospitalized with a virus and high fever, and will miss 13 games. His Yankees go 7–6 under interim manager Ralph Houk.
  - The Pittsburgh Pirates acquire left-handed starting pitcher Vinegar Bend Mizell from the St. Louis Cardinals for pitcher Ed Bauta and minor-league second baseman Julián Javier. The trade helps both clubs: Mizell, 29, goes 13–5 (3.12) in 23 starts for an eventual World Series champion; Javier, 23, a future 2x All-Star whose path in Pittsburgh is blocked by Hall-of-Famer Bill Mazeroski—also only 23 years old—helps the Cardinals to three NL pennants between 1964 and 1967 and wins two World Series rings himself.
- May 31 – Umpire and former NL outfielder Frank Secory ejects eight members of the Cincinnati Reds—six of them for bench jockeying—in Cincinnati's 11-inning, 4–3 loss to the Pirates at Forbes Field. Seven expulsions occur during the Bucs' winning rally.

=== June ===
- June 8:
  - Billy Jurges, second-year manager of the last-place Boston Red Sox, leaves the team, citing "illness." Two days later, Jurges is fired. After coach Del Baker handles the club through June 12, Jurges' predecessor as manager, Pinky Higgins, regains his old job and holds it through the end of the 1962 season.
  - Chuck Comiskey, 34-year-old grandson of the Hall of Fame founder of the Chicago White Sox (and a co-founder of the American League), Charles Comiskey, quits as the team's executive vice president. The younger Comiskey has been thwarted in his desire to take over the White Sox, initially by sister Dorothy and then by Bill Veeck, who bought Dorothy's majority share in 1959. Chuck will sell his 46% in 1961, severing his family's official connection with the club.
- June 9 – The Red Sox and Baltimore Orioles trade 27-year-old outfielders, with Boston sending Gene Stephens to the Orioles for Willie Tasby. Stephens has spent most of his eight seasons with the Red Sox as a late-inning replacement for Hall-of-Fame left-fielder Ted Williams. Tasby will take over the center-field job and become the Red Sox' first African-American regular position player; he bats .281 in 105 games before they lose him in December's AL expansion draft.
- June 12 – In a record-tying three-hour-and-52-minute, nine-inning game, Willie McCovey's pinch-hit grand slam, the first slam of his career, and Orlando Cepeda's three-run double pace the Giants to a 16–7 rout of the Milwaukee Braves.
- June 13 – For the second time in three months, the Boston Red Sox acquire catcher Russ Nixon from the Cleveland Indians, this time sending pitcher Ted Bowsfield and outfielder Marty Keough to the Tribe for Nixon and reserve outfielder Carroll Hardy. A March 16 transaction had to be cancelled when former Bosox catcher Sammy White retired rather than report to the Indians.
- June 15:
  - Mexico City and Poza Rica combine to hit 12 home runs in one game, a Mexican League record.
  - The Philadelphia Phillies acquire outfielders Tony González and Lee Walls from the Cincinnati Reds for outfielders Harry Anderson and Wally Post and minor-league first baseman Fred Hopke. González, 23, will become the Phillies' regular centerfielder through 1968 and Post, 30, will contribute to a 1961 NL pennant in his return to Cincinnati.
- June 17 – The San Francisco Giants fire fifth-year manager Bill Rigney in the midst of a 4–8 team slump. Surprisingly, they turn to 66-year-old scout Tom Sheehan as their new manager; he becomes the oldest rookie skipper in MLB annals. The move fizzles, however, as the Giants go only 46–50 under Sheehan and fall out of the National League's first division.

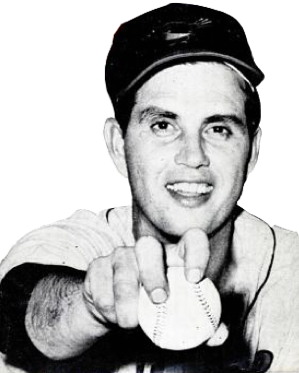
Hoyt Wilhelm

- June 19 – In a brilliant pair of pitching performances, Baltimore Orioles pitchers Hoyt Wilhelm and Milt Pappas throw shutouts to beat the host Detroit Tigers in a twin bill. Wilhelm allows two hits in winning the opener, 2–0, over Jim Bunning, and Pappas surrenders three hits in winning the nightcap, 1–0, over Don Mossi. Jim Gentile and Ron Hansen collect home runs; in knuckle-baller Wilhelm's start, catcher Clint Courtney, using the over-sized glove designed by manager Paul Richards, is twice charged with batter interference, the first loading the bases in the fourth inning.
- June 24 – Willie Mays belts two home runs and makes ten putouts to lead the San Francisco Giants to a 5–3 win at Cincinnati. Mays adds three RBI, three runs scored, and a single — and steals home.
- June 26:
  - The Chicago White Sox drub the Boston Red Sox, 21–7, in the second game of a Comiskey Park doubleheader. The Pale Hose's 21 runs are the most by any MLB team in 1960, and their 22 hits are second in the majors to the Pittsburgh Pirates' 23 safeties, put up two weeks earlier.
  - Hoping to speed up the election process, the Hall of Fame changes its voting procedures. The new rules allow the Special Veterans Committee to vote annually, rather than every other year, and to induct up to two players a year. The BBWAA is authorized to hold a runoff election of the top 30 vote getters if no one is elected in the first ballot.
- June 29 – The Cleveland Indians buy the contract of pitcher Don Newcombe from the Cincinnati Reds.
- June 30 – Dick Stuart blasts three consecutive home runs, as the Pittsburgh Pirates split a twinight doubleheader with the Giants. The first baseman drives in seven runs and joins Ralph Kiner as the second Pirate to hit three home runs in a game at Forbes Field. Stuart also is the only big-leaguer to join the three-homer club in 1960.

=== July ===
- July 1 – Bobby Thomson, who hit the famous, pennant-clinching "shot heard 'round the world" while playing for the New York Giants in October 1951, is released by the Boston Red Sox. He signs three days later with the Baltimore Orioles and goes hitless in six at bats before another unconditional release ends his MLB career on July 26.
- July 4:
  - Mickey Mantle's three-run first-inning home run off Hal Woodeshick is the 300th of his career. Mantle becomes the 18th major leaguer to join the 300-HR club, but the New York Yankees drop a 9–8 decision to the Senators.
  - As the MLB campaign approaches its half-way mark, the surprising Pittsburgh Pirates (44–28–1) lead the Milwaukee Braves by 3½ games in the National League. Mantle's Yankees (43–26–1) lead the American League by 1½ lengths over the Cleveland Indians (42–28) with the Baltimore Orioles (44–33) three games out.
- July 8:
  - The Cuban revolution led by Fidel Castro brings an end to Havana's International League team. The Sugar Kings relocate to Jersey City, marking that city's return to the league after a ten-year absence. Poor attendance at Roosevelt Stadium prompts the renamed Jersey City Jerseys, a Cincinnati Reds affiliate, to cease operations following the 1961 season.
  - The Reds sign Pete Rose, a Cincinnatian and 19-year-old graduate of Western Hills High School. Rose's uncle, Bud Bloebaum, is the bird-dog scout who calls the Reds' attention to the man who will go on to become baseball's all-time hits leader.
- July 9:
  - Jim Coates suffers his first loss after nine straight wins, and 14 straight over two seasons, as the Boston Red Sox beat the Yankees, 6–5. The Sox are led by Vic Wertz, who hits a home run, double and single to drive in four runs. Coates' major-league career-record is 17–2.
  - The Los Angeles Dodgers release minor league pitcher Tommy Lasorda, 32; he will remain with the team as a scout, then begin his Hall-of-Fame managerial career in rookie ball in 1965.
- July 11 – At Municipal Stadium, Kansas City, one-hit shutout pitching by Bob Friend and home runs by Ernie Banks and Del Crandall pace the National League to a 5–4 win over the American League in the first of two All-Star Games. Friend, of the Pittsburgh Pirates, has notched two of the NL's last three All-Star wins.

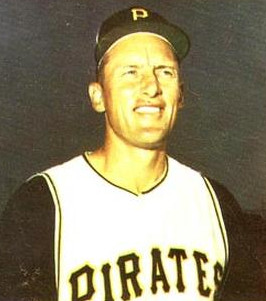
Vern Law

- July 13 – At Yankee Stadium, Vern Law becomes the second Pirates pitcher to win a 1960 All-Star Game, working two scoreless innings. Stan Musial comes off the National League bench and hits his record sixth and last All-Star Game home run. Willie Mays, Ken Boyer and Eddie Mathews also homer in the 6–0 Senior Circuit win, the third shutout in All-Star Game history. Law hurls the first two innings of the combined eight-hit shutout, followed by Johnny Podres, Stan Williams, Larry Jackson, Bill Henry, and Lindy McDaniel. Whitey Ford is the loser.
- July 15 – Baltimore Orioles third baseman and future Hall of Famer Brooks Robinson hits for the cycle (and goes five-for-five) in Baltimore's 5–2 triumph over the Chicago White Sox at Comiskey Park.
- July 18 – Virtually ensuring that New York City will get a second MLB team, the National League votes to expand to ten clubs if the Continental League declines to join "Organized Baseball." The new NL clubs would then invade New York and another CL territory, such as Houston or Minneapolis–Saint Paul. Commissioner of Baseball Ford Frick says he can think of no expansion plan that does not include New York, which lost its two NL teams to relocation after the 1957 season.
- July 19:
  - In a spectacular major-league debut, Juan Marichal of the San Francisco Giants pitches no-hit ball until Clay Dalrymple pinch-hit singles with two out in the seventh inning. Marichal winds up with 12 strikeouts and a one-hit 2–0 win against the Phillies, becoming the first National League pitcher since 1900 to debut with a one-hitter.
  - Roy Sievers' 21-game hitting streak, the longest for any player this season, ends, but Chicago White Sox teammate Luis Aparicio's inside-the-park home run and Billy Pierce's shutout beat Boston, 6–0.
  - Senators ace Pedro Ramos pitches a one-hit, 5–0 shutout over Detroit. Rocky Colavito's leadoff single in the eighth inning, a grounder that eludes shortstop José Valdivielso, is the lone safety.
- July 20 – At Cleveland Municipal Stadium, Mickey Mantle golfs a Gary Bell pitch over the auxiliary scoreboard into the distant upper deck in right field, matching Luke Easter as the only major league players to reach that spot. Cleveland holds on for an 8–6 win over the Yankees.
- July 21 – Robin Roberts pitches his third career one-hitter, and the third one-hitter of the season in new Candlestick Park. Felipe Alou spoils Roberts' no-hit bid in the fifth inning of a 3–0 Phillies victory; third baseman Joe Morgan fields the batted ball, but falls down and cannot make a throw.
- July 22 – At Fenway Park, the Boston Red Sox down the Cleveland Indians, 6–4. Vic Wertz has a three-run home run and four RBI. Ted Williams also homers, and in the seventh inning, steals second base. Williams sets a major league record as the only player to steal bases in four consecutive decades. He'll be matched by Rickey Henderson in 2000. The Indians' Jimmy Piersall homers twice, both off winner Ike Delock.
- July 23 – Kansas City outfielder Whitey Herzog hits into the only "All-Cuban triple play" in MLB history. The play goes from Washington Senators starting pitcher Pedro Ramos, to first baseman Julio Bécquer, to shortstop José Valdivielso. The victory, however, goes to reliever Chuck Stobbs (7–2) as the Senators take an 8–3 decision. Harmon Killebrew belts a two-run home run.
- July 26 – The Detroit Tigers shake up their catching corps, acquiring Hank Foiles from the Cleveland Indians and Harry Chiti from the Kansas City Athletics, and trading away Red Wilson, who goes to Cleveland with infielder Rocky Bridges in the Foiles transaction.
- July 30 – Just as he predicts, Philadelphia Phillies pitcher Art Mahaffey picks off the first batter to get a hit against him. Then with the next batter to get a hit, he does it again. Curt Flood and Bill White of the St. Louis Cardinals are the base runner victims, but St. Louis still wins, 6–3. In his next game, the first batter to get a hit off Mahaffey will be Jim Marshall, and Mahaffey will pick him off as well.

=== August ===
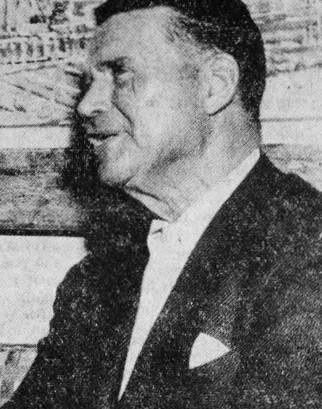
Frank Lane

- August 2 – The start-up Continental League agrees to disband without playing a game, abandoning its plan to join the American and National circuits as a third major league within "Organized Baseball." The agreement announced today calls for four of the CL's eight members to be admitted to the existing majors in an orderly expansion. Walter O'Malley, chairman of the NL Expansion Committee, says, "We immediately will recommend expansion and that we would like to do it in 1961." Against his recommendation, Branch Rickey's group unanimously accepts the proposal.
- August 3 – In an unprecedented move, Cleveland Indians GM Frank Lane trades managers with Detroit Tigers GM Bill DeWitt. The Indians' Joe Gordon (49–46) is dealt to the Tigers for Jimmy Dykes (44–52). For one game, until the pair can change places, Jo-Jo White pilots the Indians and Billy Hitchcock guides the Tigers.
- August 4 – Reacting to an inside fastball that sails over his head, second baseman Billy Martin of the Cincinnati Reds engages Chicago Cubs' rookie southpaw Jim Brewer in an altercation on the Wrigley Field pitchers' mound. Martin punches Brewer in the face, breaking the orbital bone below his right eye. Brewer undergoes season-ending surgery two days later and files suit against Martin for $1.04 million, while National League president Warren Giles suspends Martin for five games and fines him $500. Brewer's lawsuit will be settled out of court.
- August 7 – The Chicago White Sox win a pair from the Washington Senators, with reliever Gerry Staley picking up two victories. Staley will be 13–8, all in relief, with both wins and losses topping the American League relievers.
- August 8 – A day crowd of 48,323, the largest day crowd ever at Comiskey Park, cheers White Sox pitcher Billy Pierce's four-hit victory over the Yankees, 9–1. Pierce faces just 31 batters.
- August 9 – With fine relief pitching of Lindy McDaniel in the opener and a five-hitter by Curt Simmons in the nightcap, the St. Louis Cardinals sweep the Philadelphia Phillies, 5–4 and 6–0. Philadelphia's Tony Taylor ties a major league record for a second baseman by going the entire doubleheader (18 innings) without a putout – the first to achieve the feat since Connie Ryan, also of the Phillies, on June 14, 1953.
- August 10 – Ted Williams blasts a pair of home runs and a double to pace the Red Sox to a 6–1 win over the Cleveland Indians. Williams has 21 homers for the season. The first of the two today, the 512th of Williams' career, moves the 41-year-old past Mel Ott into fourth place on the all-time list. After the game, Williams announces that he will retire at the end of the season.
- August 14 – Bill White of the St. Louis Cardinals hits for the cycle off Vern Law, but the eventual Cy Young Award winner and his Pittsburgh Pirates defeat visiting St. Louis, 9–4, in the first game of a twin bill.
- August 16 – The first-place Pirates sign veteran relief pitcher Clem Labine, 34, the erstwhile Brooklyn Dodgers star, released by the Detroit Tigers the day before. The Bucs become Labine's third team of 1960 after he began the year with the Dodgers; he'll help them seal the pennant, with three wins, no losses, three saves, and a 1.48 earned run average in 15 appearances.
- August 18 – At County Stadium, Lew Burdette of the Milwaukee Braves no-hits the Philadelphia Phillies 1–0. He faces the minimum 27 batters, a fifth-inning hit-by-pitch to Tony González being the only Phillies base runner; González is retired on Lee Walls' double play ground ball one batter later. Burdette also helps his own cause by scoring the only run of the game; after doubling to lead off the eighth, he scores on Bill Bruton's double one batter later.
- August 20 – Ted Williams draws the 2,000th walk of his career in the Red Sox' split of a twi-night doubleheader with the Orioles. Williams joins Babe Ruth as the only major leaguers to collect 2,000 walks. Rickey Henderson in 2000, and Barry Bonds in 2003, will join the select 2,000 walks group.
- August 23 – Following up his no-hitter, Lew Burdette fires his third shutout in a row, pitching the Milwaukee Braves to a 7–0 win over the Los Angeles Dodgers.
  - Four days from today, Burdette's string of 33 1/3 shutout innings in a row, most in MLB in 1960, ends when he gives up a Felipe Alou home run in the fourth inning of a 3–1 loss to the San Francisco Giants at Candlestick Park.
- August 30 – At Fenway Park, Boston Red Sox second baseman Pete Runnels goes six-for-seven as Boston edges the Detroit Tigers in the 15-inning opener of a twin bill, 5–4. After his double brings Frank Malzone home with the winning run in the first game, Runnels adds three more hits in the Red Sox' ten-inning, 3–2 nightcap victory. Runnels' six hits are the most in an American League game since July 8, 1955. His nine-for-11 doubleheader performance ties a major league record.

=== September ===
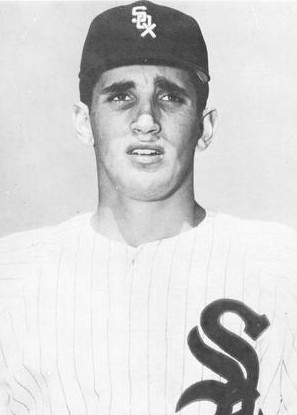
Barry Latman

- September 1 – Barry Latman of the Cleveland Indians spaces 15 hits—only two of them for extra bases—while throwing a complete-game, 7–3 victory over the host Kansas City Athletics.
- September 2 – At Fenway Park, Ted Williams belts a home run off Don Lee of the Washington Senators. As a rookie, Williams had homered off Lee's father, Thornton, almost 21 years earlier, on September 17, 1939. Today's solo homer today delivers the Boston Red Sox' only run in Lee's complete-game, 5–1 triumph.
- September 3:
  - A battle of left-handed pitchers features Sandy Koufax of the Dodgers against Mike McCormick of the Giants. Felipe Alou's home run gives McCormick a 1–0 win, his second 1–0 win against Los Angeles in 1960.
  - In the International League, Al Cicotte of the Toronto Maple Leafs pitches an 11-inning no-hitter against the Montreal Royals.
- September 6 – In his final game at Yankee Stadium, Ted Williams hits his 518th career home run in the Red Sox' 7–1 win.
- September 10 – In Detroit, Mickey Mantle's seventh-inning home run off Paul Foytack clears Briggs Stadium's right field roof and lands in the Brooks Lumber Yard across Trumbull Avenue. In June 1985, Mantle's blow will be retroactively measured at 643 feet (196 m) and added to the Guinness Book of World Records. His three-run blast salts away a 5–1 triumph that puts the New York Yankees a half-game ahead of Baltimore in the AL pennant race.
- September 13 – Eighteen-year-old outfielder Danny Murphy becomes the youngest Chicago Cubs player to hit a home run with his three-run shot off Bob Purkey of the Cincinnati Reds, as the Reds win 8–6 at home. "Bonus baby" Murphy will play just 49 games for the Cubs from 1960 to 1962. He will come back as a pitcher for the Chicago White Sox in 1969.
- September 15 – Willie Mays ties the modern major league record with three triples in a game against the Philadelphia Phillies at Connie Mack Stadium. The last National League player to hit three triples in a game had been Roberto Clemente, in 1958. Light-hitting shortstop Eddie Bressoud also triples, giving the Giants four three-baggers in the nine-inning game.
- September 16:
  - At the age of 39, Warren Spahn notches his 11th 20-win season with a 4–0 no-hitter against the Phillies. Spahn also sets a Milwaukee club record with 15 strikeouts in handing the last-place Phils their 90th loss of the year.
  - The Baltimore Orioles (83–58) and New York Yankees (82–57) open a crucial four games series with the Orioles just .002 in back of New York. When the series ends three days later, the Yankees will have swept Baltimore and started a 15-game victory skein that leaves the faltering Birds in second place, eight games out, at season's end.
- September 18 – At Wrigley Field, Ernie Banks sets a record by drawing his 27th intentional walk of the season.
- September 19 – The Chicago White Sox' pennant hopes are damaged with a nightcap 7–6 loss to the Detroit Tigers, after they win the opener, 8–4. Pinch hitter Norm Cash scores the decisive run in Game 2. Cash will end the season by grounding into no double plays, becoming the first American League player since official "GIDP" records were started in 1940. Dick McAuliffe and Roger Repoz will duplicate Cash's feat in 1968.
- September 20 – Boston Red Sox outfielder Carroll Hardy pinch-hits for Ted Williams, who is forced to leave the game after fouling a ball off his ankle, and grounds into a double play. On May 31, 1961, Hardy will pinch hit for rookie Carl Yastrzemski, making him the only player to go in for both future Hall of Famers. Hardy also hit his first major league home run pinch-hitting for Roger Maris when both were at Cleveland (May 18, 1958).
- September 25:
  - For the first time in 33 years, the Pittsburgh Pirates are headed for the World Series. Although they drop their third straight contest to the Milwaukee Braves today, 4–2 in ten innings at County Stadium, the second-place St. Louis Cardinals are eliminated from contention, 5–0, by the Chicago Cubs. A crowd of 125,000 greets the Bucs with a torchlight parade after the team arrives by plane in Pittsburgh. It's the Pirates' seventh NL flag.
  - Ralph Terry clinches the New York Yankees' 25th pennant with a 4–3 win over the host Boston Red Sox, the Bombers' ninth straight victory. Luis Arroyo saves the win. It is Casey Stengel's tenth pennant in 12 years at the team's helm.
  - As in 1927, Pittsburgh and New York will face off in the 1960 World Series. In 1927, the "Murderers' Row" Yankees of Ruth, Gehrig and Lazzeri had swept the Pirates in four games, outscoring them 23–10.
- September 27 – The recently crowned NL champion Pirates play the season's longest game, going 151/3 innings to edge the Cincinnati Reds, 4–3, at Forbes Field. Four Pittsburgh pitchers, led by starter Tom Cheney, rack up 19 strikeouts, with the Reds' Cliff Cook (four) and Wally Post (three) leading the futility parade. Almost two years from now—on September 12, 1962, and in a Washington Senators uniform—Cheney will fan 21 Baltimore Orioles in a 16-inning complete game.
- September 28:
  - In his last major league at bat, Ted Williams picks out a 1–1 pitch by Baltimore's Jack Fisher and drives it 450 feet into the right-center field seats behind the Boston bullpen. It is Williams' 521st and last career home run, putting him third on the all-time list behind Jimmie Foxx (534) and Babe Ruth (714). Williams stays in the dugout, ignoring the thunderous ovation at Fenway Park, and refuses to tip his hat to the hometown fans. That moment will wait until "Ted Williams Day" on May 12, 1991.
  - The seventh-place Red Sox do away with the position of general manager, firing incumbent Bucky Harris, handing player personnel responsibilities to field manager Pinky Higgins, and promoting business manager Dick O'Connell to executive vice president.

=== October ===
- October 2:
  - The New York Yankees head into the World Series with a 15-game winning streak, the eighth longest streak in the American League this century, after Dale Long's two-run ninth-inning home run gives them an 8–7 win over the Boston Red Sox. The Yanks' 193 home runs are an AL season record, three better than the mark they set in 1956. AL RBI leader Roger Maris drives in three runs, but falls one home run short of Mickey Mantle's league-high 40.
  - In what will be their final home game after 60 years in the U.S. capital, the Washington Senators fall to the Baltimore Orioles, 2–1, at Griffith Stadium. The Orioles' Milt Pappas wins a pitchers' duel against Pedro Ramos, who gives up a home run to Jackie Brandt for the deciding run. The loss is Washington's 11th in their last 12 games; the Senators had been 72–70 and in the American League's first division as late as September 16. The franchise will move to Minneapolis–Saint Paul as the Minnesota Twins later this month.
- October 3 – The annual off-season game of managerial musical chairs begins when the Kansas City Athletics fire first-year skipper Bob Elliott and Joe Gordon quits the Detroit Tigers only two months after taking the Bengal helm. Gordon has been at odds with Detroit's president, Bill DeWitt.
  - On October 5, Gordon will sign a two-year, $35,000 contract to become the pilot of the 1961 Athletics. He's appointed by lame-duck general manager Parke Carroll, who's a holdover from the late owner Arnold Johnson's regime.

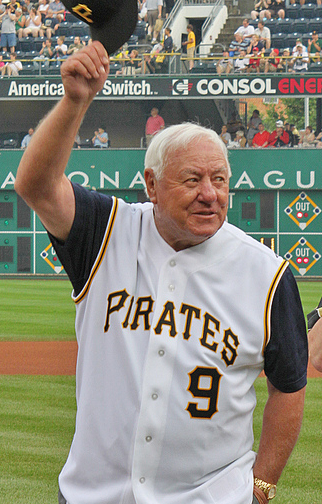
Bill Mazeroski, a half-century after his World Series heroics

- October 5:
  - In a portent of things to come, Bill Mazeroski's two-run fifth-inning home run off Jim Coates is the difference as the Pittsburgh Pirates beat the Yankees, 6–4, in Game 1 of the 1960 World Series, the Bucs' first Fall Classic victory since 1925. Roy Face survives a two-run, ninth-inning Elston Howard home run to preserve Vern Law's victory.
  - Lou Boudreau quits as manager of the Chicago Cubs to return to the team's radio booth. Boudreau, 43, compiled a 54–83 (.394) record for the seventh-place Cubbies after taking command on May 5.
- October 6 – Mickey Mantle hits two home runs in a Yankees' 16–3, Game 2 victory at Forbes Field, evening the World Series. A seven-run sixth inning overwhelms Pittsburgh.
- October 8 – At Yankee Stadium, Bobby Richardson collects six RBI, including a grand slam off reliever Clem Labine in a six-run first inning, and Whitey Ford pitches a four-hit, 10–0 shutout to give the Bombers a 2–1 World Series lead—and spoiling Pittsburgh manager Danny Murtaugh's 43rd birthday.
- October 9 – Vern Law wins again, thanks to his own RBI single and Bill Virdon's two-run hit. Roy Face retires the final eight batters in order. The Pittsburgh Pirates' 3–2 win evens the 1960 World Series after four games.
- October 10 – Bill Mazeroski stars again: his two-run double stakes Harvey Haddix to a 3–0 lead in Game 5. Roy Face is called on once more for another hitless effort to preserve a 5–2 win over the Yankees and a one-game World Series lead for the surprising Pirates.
- October 12 – In Game 6 of the World Series, Whitey Ford preserves the Yankees' hopes with a seven-hit shutout at Forbes Field. Bob Friend is bombed again as the Yankees coast, 12–0. Bobby Richardson's two run-scoring triples give him a Fall Classic record of 12 RBI.
- October 13 – The Pittsburgh Pirates defeat the New York Yankees, 10–9, in Game 7 of the World Series, to win their third world championship and first since 1925, four games to three. In a 9–9 tie, Bill Mazeroski leads off the last of the ninth inning and hits perhaps the most dramatic homer in Series history, off Yankees hurler Ralph Terry. The drama is heightened by the excitement that precedes Mazeroski's clinching blow: a combined total of seven runs are scored by both teams in a wild and wacky bottom of the eighth and top of the ninth.
  - Today's is the only World Series game of the 20th century in which no strikeouts are recorded.
  - The 1960 Series becomes the only Fall Classic ever won by a home run in the bottom of the ninth inning of the seventh and deciding game.
  - Despite Mazeroski's heroics, Yankees second baseman Bobby Richardson is elected the Series MVP, as the Yankees outscore Pittsburgh, 55 to 27.
- October 17 – The National League votes to admit Houston and New York City teams to the league in 1962, its first structural change since 1900, and to expand to a ten-team league.
- October 18 – Instituting a mandatory retirement age of 65, New York Yankees co-owners Dan Topping and Del Webb relieve Casey Stengel of his duties as manager. Stengel says, "I wasn't retired—they fired me." The 70-year-old ex-skipper compiled a 1,149–696–6 (.623) record with the Yankees, and won seven World Series and ten American League titles during his 1949–1960 stewardship.
- October 20 – Coach Ralph Houk, 41, is named to succeed Stengel at the Yankees' helm. A former back-up catcher and successful minor-league manager, Houk also stepped in as emergency skipper this past season from May 28 to June 6 when Stengel was hospitalized.
- October 22 – As relations between Cuba and the United States worsen, Commissioner of Baseball Ford Frick bars U.S. players (though not native Cubans playing in MLB or the minor leagues) from participating in the upcoming Cuban Winter League season.
- October 25 – Gabe Paul, general manager of the Cincinnati Reds since October 1951, quits his post to join Houston's National League expansion team as their first front-office boss. Although Paul doesn't stay long, he brings young Cincinnati executives Tal Smith and Bill Giles to Houston, and both play key roles in what will become the Colt .45s/Astros' early years.

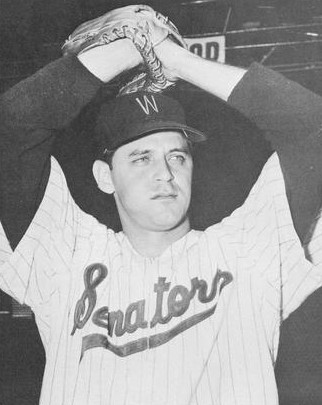
Pedro Ramos, who started (and lost) the final game in the annals of the AL's first Washington Senators franchise

- October 26 – Trying to jump ahead of the National League, the American League announces it will add two clubs in 1961 and become a ten-team circuit. The AL admits Los Angeles as an expansion team and permits Calvin Griffith to move his existing Washington Senators franchise, and all its major- and minor-league players, to Minneapolis–Saint Paul. It then grants a second expansion club to Washington, D.C., also to be called the Senators, which will be established under new ownership and build its organization from scratch.
  - AL president Joe Cronin says the Junior Circuit will adopt a 162-game schedule, with clubs playing 18 games against each opponent. Moreover, the first expansion of the traditional 16-team major league framework since the dawn of the post-1901 "modern era" will begin all but immediately, with less than six months until Opening Day 1961.
  - The AL expands without notifying Commissioner of Baseball Ford Frick or the National League in advance. The NL reacts by saying the AL expansion, unlike its move into Houston and New York City, does not comply with MLB's August 2 agreement with the Continental League, and that the American League has not been invited to share the Los Angeles market, controlled by powerful Dodgers owner Walter O'Malley.
- October 31 – The San Francisco Giants acquire infielder Alvin Dark from the Milwaukee Braves in exchange for shortstop Andre Rodgers. Dark, former captain of the old New York Giants, ends his playing career at age 38 and is named to succeed Tom Sheehan as San Francisco's manager for 1961.

=== November ===
- November 2:
  - George Weiss, who had a hand in 15 World Series champions in 29 seasons with the New York Yankees—eight as farm system director (1932–1947) and seven as general manager (1948–1960)—is forced into retirement at age 66. A longtime assistant, Roy Hamey, replaces him.
  - Hank Greenberg asks for American League dates at the Los Angeles Coliseum, home of the National League Dodgers. Greenberg and Bill Veeck—the incumbent general manager and principal owner, respectively, of the Chicago White Sox—are expected to run the new Los Angeles club in the AL. On November 17, Greenberg will drop out of the bidding to run the new franchise.
  - Veteran executive Bill DeWitt steps down as president and de facto general manager of the Detroit Tigers and joins the Cincinnati Reds as vice president/GM. One year and a National League pennant later, DeWitt will purchase the Cincinnati franchise from the estate of Powel Crosley Jr. Meanwhile, in Detroit, Rick Ferrell, Hall of Fame catcher, regains the Tigers' GM responsibilities.
- November 3 – The Pittsburgh Pirates' Vern Law is elected winner of the 1960 Cy Young Award. The right-hander, 30, posted a 20–9 (3.08) record and helped his club win the NL pennant with a league-leading 18 complete games. Only 14 ballots are cast in the voting, and all go to National League pitchers: Law garners eight, followed by Warren Spahn (four), Ernie Broglio (two) and Lindy McDaniel (two).
- November 9 – Roger Maris, in his first season as a member of the New York Yankees, edges superstar teammate Mickey Mantle to win the 1960 AL Most Valuable Player Award. Mantle receives more first-place votes (ten) but fewer total points (222) than Maris (eight first-place mentions and 225 points). Brooks Robinson, 23, places third with 211 points and three first-place votes. Maris, 26, led the AL in runs batted in (112) and slugging percentage (.581).
- November 17:
  - Elwood "Pete" Quesada, retired United States Air Force general and head of the Federal Aviation Administration, becomes the founding principal owner of the expansion version of the Washington Senators. The undercapitalized and hastily organized franchise will struggle through two seasons before Quesada sells the Senators in January 1963.
  - The NL and 1960 World Series champion Pittsburgh Pirates pick up another major BBWAA award, when veteran shortstop and league batting champion Dick Groat is elected his circuit's Most Valuable Player. Groat, 30, outpoints Buc third baseman Don Hoak, 276 to 162 and 16 first-place votes to five. Pittsburgh right-fielder Roberto Clemente (62 points and one first-place vote) finishes a distant seventh.
- November 20 – With the American League expansion draft less than four weeks away, Quesada's "new" Senators appoint former American Association president Ed Doherty, 60, general manager, and former first baseman, two-time batting champion and star of the "old" Senators Mickey Vernon, 42, the expansion team's field manager.
- November 21:
  - A young and surprising Baltimore Orioles team sweeps the BBWAA's 1960 AL Rookie of the Year balloting: shortstop Ron Hansen breezes to the trophy with 22 of 24 first-place votes, while right-hander Chuck Estrada and first baseman Jim Gentile each get one nod.
  - Bob Scheffing, ex-catcher who skippered the Chicago Cubs from 1957–1959, signs to manage the Detroit Tigers after the job is turned down by Casey Stengel.
- November 22 – The AL proposes that both leagues expand to nine teams in 1961 and begin interleague play. It will delay entering the Los Angeles market if the National League agrees. (There will be expansion to ten teams in the American League in 1961, followed by the NL in 1962; interleague play does not arrive until 1997.)
- November 23 – Los Angeles Dodgers outfielder Frank Howard is selected NL Rookie of the Year with 12 of 24 votes. The six-foot, seven-inch (2.01 m) Howard belted 23 home runs during the regular season.
- November 26 – Upon arrival in the Twin Cities of Minneapolis and Saint Paul, the team formerly known as the Washington Senators chooses the appropriate nickname Twins as its new identity.
- November 29 – The expansion Washington Senators sign their first player, free-agent infielder Danny O'Connell, 31, an eight-year National League veteran who had spent 1960 at Triple-A Tacoma.

=== December ===
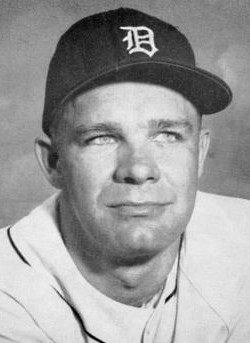
Harvey Kuenn

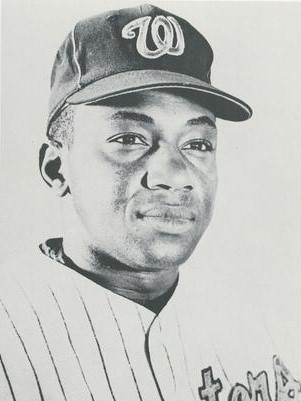
Willie Kirkland

- December 3:
  - The San Francisco Giants acquire 1959 American League batting champ Harvey Kuenn, 30, from the Cleveland Indians for pitcher Johnny Antonelli and outfielder Willie Kirkland.
  - The Milwaukee Braves purchase the contract of Billy Martin from the Cincinnati Reds.
- December 5 – American League president Joe Cronin suggests that if the National League starts its new New York City franchise in 1961, the AL will stay out of Los Angeles until 1962. The NL turned down the suggested compromise of November 22 because Houston will not be ready in 1961.
- December 6 – A group headed by movie star Gene Autry and former football star Bob Reynolds is awarded the American League's Los Angeles Angels expansion franchise.
  - The franchise enters the AL after an indemnification agreement is reached with Walter O'Malley, who owns the established Los Angeles Dodgers. Under its terms the Angels will become tenants at Dodger Stadium when the new facility opens in 1962.
  - Autry and Reynolds appoint Fred Haney, 64, former field manager of the 1957–1958 NL champion Milwaukee Braves, general manager and Bill Rigney, 42, fired in June by the San Francisco Giants, as the Angels' first skipper.
- December 7 – The Detroit Tigers acquire veteran centerfielder and three-time NL stolen base king Bill Bruton, pitcher Terry Fox, catcher Dick Brown and infielder Chuck Cottier from the Milwaukee Braves for Gold Glove Award-winning and four-time All-Star second baseman Frank Bolling and reserve outfielder Neil Chrisley (a player to be named later).
- December 12 – The newborn Los Angeles Angels franchise signs its first player: free agent catcher Del Rice, 38. The 16-year MLB veteran had played under Angel GM Fred Haney on the Braves' pennant-winning teams of 1957–1958.
- December 14 – The American League stocks its two new teams with the first-ever expansion draft. Two former New York Yankees pitchers — Eli Grba (Angels) and Bobby Shantz (Senators) — are the top choices in the intraleague lottery.
- December 15:
  - The Cincinnati Reds make two significant trades. In the first, the Reds send shortstop Roy McMillan to the Milwaukee Braves for pitchers Joey Jay and Juan Pizarro. Then, they trade left-hander Pizarro, along with veteran hurler Cal McLish, to the Chicago White Sox for third baseman Gene Freese. Jay (a 21-game winner and NL All-Star) and Freese (26 HR, 87 RBI, .277 BA) will play integral roles in Cincinnati's 1961 National League pennant.
  - The brand-new Washington Senators trade their first pick in yesterday's expansion draft, veteran left-handed pitcher Bobby Shantz, to the Pittsburgh Pirates for right-hander Bennie Daniels, first baseman R C Stevens and third baseman Harry Bright.
  - Two of the tallest pitchers of their era, 6 ft 8 in (2.03 m) Gene Conley of the Philadelphia Phillies and 6 ft 7½ in (2.02 m) Frank Sullivan of the Boston Red Sox, are traded for each other in a one for one deal. During the winter, Conley serves as the backup center to Bill Russell of the Boston Celtics.
- December 19 – Chicago-based insurance tycoon Charles O. Finley buys 52 percent of the Kansas City Athletics from the late Arnold Johnson's estate for a reported $1.975 million. Finley, 42, has been an unsuccessful bidder for numerous American League teams since 1954, and earlier this month withdrew his bid to buy the expansion Angels' franchise. He tells reporters: "I have no intention of moving the club out of Kansas City."
- December 21 – Chicago Cubs owner Philip K. Wrigley says his team will have no manager in 1960, but will use a "College of Coaches."

== Births ==
=== January ===
- January 3 – Randy Hunt
- January 4 – Paul Gibson
- January 8
  - Randy Ready
  - Julio Solano
- January 9 – Norifumi Nishimura
- January 10
  - Bob Brower
  - Kelvin Torve
- January 12
  - Tim Hulett
  - Mike Marshall
  - Mike Trujillo
- January 14 – Ross Jones
- January 15 – Curt Brown
- January 17 – Chili Davis
- January 18 – Gibson Alba
- January 21
  - Andy Hawkins
  - Darryl Motley
- January 23 – Reggie Ritter
- January 28 – Stu Pederson
- January 29 – Steve Sax

=== February ===
- February 1 – Cecilio Guante
- February 2 – Buddy Biancalana
- February 4 – Tim Pyznarski
- February 16
  - Eric Bullock
  - Bill Pecota
- February 18 – Bob Fallon
- February 24 – Nick Esasky
- February 29 – Bill Long

=== March ===
- March 2 – Mike Woodard
- March 3
  - Chuck Cary
  - Neal Heaton
- March 4 – Jeff Dedmon
- March 6 – Rick Behenna
- March 7 – Joe Carter
- March 8 – Kevin Hagen
- March 14
  - Kirby Puckett
  - Jerry Willard
- March 15 – Mike Pagliarulo
- March 18 – Matt Winters
- March 20 – Mike Young
- March 22 – Scott Bradley
- March 22 – Matt Sinatro
- March 24 – Dwight Taylor

=== April ===
- April 2 – Tom Barrett
- April 3 – Tim Conroy
- April 4 – John Lickert
- April 5 – Jim Scranton
- April 12 – Bill Lindsey
- April 14 – Paul Hodgson
- April 15 – Mike Diaz
- April 16 – Curt Young
- April 19 – Frank Viola
- April 20 – Randy Kutcher
- April 21 – Greg Legg
- April 26 – Steve Lombardozzi
- April 27
  - Jim Eppard
  - Brian Giles
- April 28
  - Tom Browning
  - John Cerutti
  - Mark Ryal

=== May ===
- May 1 – Charlie O'Brien
- May 4 – Tim Tschida
- May 9 – Tony Gwynn
- May 13 – Lenny Faedo
- May 21 – Kent Hrbek
- May 26 – Rob Murphy
- May 31 – Jeff Schaefer

=== June ===
- June 2 – Lemmie Miller
- June 3
  - Barry Lyons
  - Steve Lyons
- June 7 – Jim Paciorek
- June 14
  - Mike Laga
  - Pat Larkin
- June 20
  - Doug Gwosdz
  - Larry See
- June 22 – Greg Booker
- June 23
  - Jim Deshaies
  - John Rabb
- June 26 – Pete Dalena
- June 27 – Jackie Gutiérrez
- June 30 – Al Newman

=== July ===
- July 3 – Jack Daugherty
- July 6 – Germán Rivera
- July 8 – Mike Ramsey
- July 13 – Mike Fitzgerald
- July 16 – Terry Pendleton
- July 20 – Mike Witt
- July 24 – Jeff Kaiser
- July 28 – Carmelo Martínez
- July 29 – Daryl Smith
- July 30 – Steve Ellsworth

=== August ===
- August 1 – Dave Anderson
- August 3 – Sid Bream
- August 4 – Steve Davis
- August 9 – Stan Clarke
- August 11 – Al Pedrique
- August 14 – Edwin Rodríguez
- August 16 – Bill Mooneyham
- August 18 – Mike LaValliere
- August 19
  - Ron Darling
  - Sap Randall
- August 20
  - Tom Brunansky
  - Mark Langston
  - Ed Wojna
- August 23
  - Ed Hearn
  - Randy St. Claire
- August 24 – Cal Ripken Jr.
- August 25 – Bobby Meacham
- August 29
  - Bill Latham
  - Rusty Tillman
  - Reggie Williams
- August 30
  - Randy O'Neal
  - Rick Seilheimer
- August 31 – Morris Madden

=== September ===
- September 2 – Rex Hudler
- September 3 – Rene Gonzales
- September 5
  - Tim Birtsas
  - John Christensen
  - Chris Green
  - Candy Maldonado
- September 6
  - Al Lachowicz
  - Greg Olson
- September 7 – Wade Rowdon
- September 9 – Alvin Davis
- September 12 – Trench Davis
- September 15 – Todd Fischer
- September 16
  - Mel Hall
  - Dan Jennings
  - Mickey Tettleton
- September 17 – John Franco
- September 18 – Scott Earl
- September 19 – Phil Stephenson
- September 20
  - Dave Gallagher
  - Randy Kramer
- September 21 – Rick Rodriguez
- September 22 – Mark Hirschbeck
- September 25 – Dave Walsh
- September 29
  - Rob Deer
  - Howard Johnson

=== October ===
- October 2 – Ernest Riles
- October 4
  - Joe Boever
  - Billy Hatcher
- October 5 – Randy Bockus
- October 6
  - Jay Baller
  - Bruce Fields
  - Bill Johnson
  - Jeff Zaske
- October 10 – Bill Moore
- October 11 – Curt Ford
- October 14 – Bill Bathe
- October 17 – Ken Dixon
- October 18
  - Terry Clark
  - Steve Kiefer
- October 19 – Mark Davis
- October 21 – Franklin Stubbs
- October 25 – Kelly Downs
- October 27
  - Tom Nieto
  - Ron Shepherd
- October 28 – Mark Knudson
- October 30
  - José Escobar
  - Gerald Perry
  - Lee Tunnell
  - Dave Valle
- October 31 – Mike Gallego

=== November ===
- November 1 – Fernando Valenzuela
- November 6 – Ron Romanick
- November 11
  - Gary Jones
  - Jeff Ransom
- November 12 – Donnie Hill
- November 15 – Rick Luecken
- November 16 – Curt Wardle
- November 21 – Mark Eichhorn
- November 22
  - Gene Walter
  - Colin Ward
- November 26 – Harold Reynolds
- November 28 – Ken Howell
- November 29 – Howard Johnson
- November 30 – Bob Tewksbury

=== December ===
- December 3 – Gene Nelson
- December 4 – David Green
- December 8 – John Mizerock
- December 9
  - Gary Denbo
  - Juan Samuel
- December 10
  - Paul Assenmacher
  - Jeff Bettendorf
- December 13 – Jeff Robinson
- December 14 – Mike Rizzo
- December 20 – José DeLeón
- December 21
  - Roger McDowell
  - Andy Van Slyke
- December 24 – John Costello
- December 25
  - Ty Gainey
  - Tom O'Malley
- December 26 – Jeff Stone
- December 28
  - Zane Smith
  - Carl Willis
- December 29 – Jim Wilson

== Deaths ==
=== January ===
- January 1 – Tige Stone, 58, outfielder/pitcher who appeared in five contests for 1923 St. Louis Cardinals
- January 2 – Ken Gables, 40, pitcher who worked in 62 total games for 1945–1947 Pittsburgh Pirates
- January 5 – Clay Van Alstyne, 59, pitcher in six games for 1926–1927 Washington Senators
- January 10 – Bunny Fabrique, 72, shortstop for the 1916–1917 Brooklyn Robins who got into 27 career big-league games
- January 12 – Jimmy Lavender, 75, pitcher for the Chicago Cubs from 1912 to 1916, and for the Philadelphia Phillies in 1917
- January 15 – Frankie Austin, 43, Panamanian shortstop who played in 251 games for the 1944–1948 Philadelphia Stars of the Negro National League; batted .337 lifetime and was selected to six All-Star teams
- January 19 – Bob Fagan, 65, second baseman for the 1921 Kansas City Monarchs and 1923 St. Louis Stars of the Negro National League
- January 20 – Gibby Brack, 51, outfielder/first baseman for the Brooklyn Dodgers and Philadelphia Phillies who played in 315 games between 1937 and 1939
- January 24 – Russ Ford, 76, Canadian pitcher who twirled for the New York Highlanders/Yankees (1909–1913) and Buffalo of the "outlaw" Federal League (1914–1915); three-time 20-game winner (1910, 1911, 1914) — including a 26-game-winning campaign for the 1910 Highlanders; inducted into the Canadian Baseball Hall of Fame (1987)
- January 25 – Palmer Hildebrand, 75, catcher who appeared in 26 games for the 1913 St. Louis Cardinals
- January 28 – Bill Warren, 75, Federal League catcher who played 31 games in 1914–1915 for Indianapolis and Newark

=== February ===
- February 3 – Lem McDougal, 65, pitcher for the Chicago Giants of the Negro National League in 1920
- February 6 – Noodles Hahn, 80, left-handed hurler for the Cincinnati Reds (1899–1905) and New York Highlanders (1906); won 22 or more games during four of his seven seasons with Cincinnati
- February 11
  - Fritz Clausen, 90, a 19th-century pitcher for the Louisville Colonels and Chicago Colts
  - Roy Mack, 71, son of Connie Mack; vice president of the Philadelphia Athletics from 1936 to August 1950, and co-owner with his brother Earle from that point to November 1954, when the Mack brothers sold the Philadelphia franchise to banker and real-estate magnate Arnold Johnson (died March 6, 1960), who moved it to Kansas City for 1955
- February 16
  - Stuffy McInnis, 69, excellent fielding first baseman (committed only one error in 152 games and 1,652 chances for a .9994 fielding percentage in 1921); batted .307 lifetime for six clubs, most prominently with the Philadelphia Athletics' "$100,000 infield" (1909–1917); four-time World Series champion with A's (1911, 1913), Boston Red Sox (1918) and Pittsburgh Pirates (1925); managed National League Phillies to an abysmal 51–103 mark in 1927 then became a longtime college baseball coach
  - Jasper Washington, 63, first- and third baseman who played in the Negro leagues between 1921 and 1933, notably for the Homestead Grays
- February 18 – Fred Schemanske, 56, pitcher and pinch hitter for 1923 Washington Senators; went 2-for-2 (1.000) as emergency batsman, far outshining his one inning pitched and earned run average of 27.00
- February 20 – George Leitner, 88, who pitched for the New York Giants, Philadelphia Athletics, Cleveland Blues and Chicago White Sox in 1901–1902; one of several deaf-mute MLB players at turn of 20th century
- February 24 – Uke Clanton, 62, first baseman for the 1922 Cleveland Indians
- February 27 – Arthur Coleman, 61, pitcher/outfielder/first baseman for the 1920 Dayton Marcos of the Negro National League

=== March ===
- March 2 – Howie Camnitz, 78, pitcher who spent nine of his 11 MLB seasons with the Pittsburgh Pirates (1904, 1906–1913); won 20 or more games three times for the Pirates, and was a member of 1909 World Series champions
- March 3 – Toussaint Allen, 63, outfielder in the Negro leagues from 1914 to 1928
- March 6 – Arnold Johnson, 54, Chicago-based businessman who purchased the Philadelphia Athletics in November 1954, transferred the franchise to Kansas City for 1955, and owned the team until his death
- March 10 – Jim Holmes, 78, pitched in 18 career games as a member of the 1906 Philadelphia Athletics and 1908 Brooklyn Superbas
- March 17 – Bob Thorpe, 24, pitcher who appeared in two games for the 1955 Chicago Cubs
- March 18 – Dixie Howell, 40, relief pitcher for the 1940 Cleveland Indians, 1949 Cincinnati Reds and 1955–1958 Chicago White Sox; combat veteran of World War II who, starting in September 1944, spent six months in captivity as a POW; still an active player when he died from a heart attack during spring training drills in Florida
- March 21 – Mack Stewart, 45, relief pitcher who appeared in 24 games for the 1943–1944 Chicago Cubs during World War II
- March 22 – Gordon Rhodes, 52, pitcher who played from 1929 to 1936 for the New York Yankees, Boston Red Sox and Philadelphia Athletics
- March 26 – Dan Tipple, 70, pitcher who worked in three games for 1915 Yankees
- March 29 – Kid Carsey, 87, pitcher/outfielder who played in 329 games (296 on the mound) for six clubs between 1891 and 1901; lost 37 games in one season (1891) as a pitcher for the Washington Statesmen of the then-major-league American Association; won 24 games for Philadelphia Phillies in 1895
- March 30 – Joe Connolly, 65, outfielder for the New York Giants, Cleveland Indians and Boston Red Sox in the 1920s

=== April ===
- April 17 – Ricardo Torres, 69, Cuban catcher who played in 22 games for the 1920–1922 Washington Senators; father of Gil Torres
- April 19
  - Vallie Eaves, 48, pitcher who appeared in 24 total MLB games for 1935 Philadelphia Athletics, 1939–1940 Chicago White Sox, and 1941–1942 Chicago Cubs
  - Bob Osborn, 57, pitcher who went 27–17 (4.32) in 121 career games for Chicago Cubs (1925–1927 and 1929–1930) and Pittsburgh Pirates (1931)
- April 22 – Johnson Hill, 69, third baseman who played in the Negro leagues between 1910 and 1927
- April 30
  - Oscar "Cannonball" Owens, 66, outfielder/pitcher in the Negro leagues of the 1920s; in the two seasons (1922, 1929) for which Baseball Reference lists his batting statistics, he hit .398 during his 61-game career (74-for-186)
  - Herman Pillette, 64, pitcher in 106 games for 1923–1925 Detroit Tigers (and one contest for 1917 Cincinnati Reds); won 19 games for 1923 Tigers, then lost 19 for 1924 Bengals; father of Duane Pillette

=== May ===
- May 1 – Lou Schettler, 73, Philadelphia Phillies pitcher who worked in 27 games in 1910
- May 6
  - Vern Bickford, 39, pitcher who won 66 games for the Boston/Milwaukee Braves (1948–1953), including a no-hitter on August 11, 1950, against the Brooklyn Dodgers
  - Merlin Kopp, 68, outfielder for the 1915 Washington Senators and 1918–1919 Philadelphia Athletics
- May 8 – Howie Camp, 66, outfielder in five games for 1917 New York Yankees
- May 12 – Gus Felix, 64, outfielder for the Boston Braves (1923–1925) and Brooklyn Robins (1926–1927); finished third in the National League in putouts by a centerfielder in 1925
- May 19
  - Leo Fishel, 82, Columbia University alumnus and future lawyer who hurled for the 1899 New York Giants; said to be first Jewish pitcher in MLB history
  - George Winkelman, 95, pitcher/outfielder for Washington of the National League in 1886
- May 20 – Pat Collins, 63, catcher who appeared in 543 games for three MLB clubs over ten seasons spanning 1919 and 1929, most notably the 1926–1928 New York Yankees, when he contributed to three consecutive American League pennants and 1927–1928 World Series titles; most-used of three platoon catchers for 1927 "Murderers' Row" edition and started Games 1 and 4 of Bombers' 1927 Series sweep of Pittsburgh, going 3-for-3 in Series-clinching contest
- May 21
  - Leo Birdine, 65, pitcher/outfielder/third baseman who played in 129 games for the Birmingham Black Barons and Memphis Red Sox of the Negro leagues between 1927 and 1932
  - George Cochran, 71, a third baseman for the 1918 Boston Red Sox
- May 30 – George Hildebrand, 81, American League umpire from 1913 to 1934 who worked in four World Series; outfielder for Brooklyn in 1902, also credited with developing the spitball while in the minor leagues

=== June ===
- June 1 – Harry Dean, 45, relief pitcher with two appearances and two innings pitched for 1941 Washington Senators
- June 5 – Rip Jordan, 70, pitcher who appeared in majors for the 1912 Chicago White Sox and 1919 Washington Senators; went 21–2 (2.14 ERA) in his final minor-league campaign in 1921 Class B Sally League
- June 10
  - Vic Delmore, 44, National League umpire who worked 618 league games from 1956 through 1959; home plate umpire on June 30, 1959, when confusion over a foul tip resulted in two baseballs "in play" at the same time
  - Charlie Fallon, 79, outfielder by trade who was a pinch runner for the 1905 New York Highlanders
- June 12 – Art Wilson, 74, catcher whose 14-year (1908–1921) career was spent in three major leagues; appeared in 812 games for New York, Pittsburgh, Chicago and Boston of the National League, Chicago of the Federal circuit, and Cleveland of the American League
- June 25 – Tommy Corcoran, 91, longtime shortstop, and captain of the Cincinnati Reds for 10 years
- June 27 – Square Moore, 59, stocky pitcher who appeared in 76 games for five Negro National League teams between 1924 and 1928
- June 28 – Louis "Bull" Durham, 83, pitcher for the Brooklyn Superbas, Washington Senators and New York Giants who got into nine games over four seasons between 1904 and 1909

=== July ===
- July 3 – "Reindeer Bill" Killefer, 72, catcher who played 13 seasons (1909–1921) for three MLB clubs (St. Louis Browns, Philadelphia Phillies and Chicago Cubs) and gained fame as Hall of Fame pitcher Grover Cleveland Alexander's favorite receiver; spent 48 years in professional baseball, including all or part of nine years as manager of the Cubs between 1921 and 1925 and Browns between 1930 and 1933; as a scout, signed the American League's first black player, Hall of Famer Larry Doby, for the Cleveland Indians in 1947
- July 4
  - Frank Parkinson, 65, second baseman and shortstop for the 1921–1924 Philadelphia Phillies, appearing in 378 MLB games
  - Eddie Wall, 56, left-hander who pitched for the 1926 Cleveland Elites of the Negro National League
- July 8 – Joe Krakauskas, 45, Canadian southpaw hurler who worked in 149 career games for Washington Senators and Cleveland Indians from 1937 to 1942 and in 1946
- July 10 – Harry Redmond, 72, second baseman for 1909 Brooklyn Superbas
- July 13
  - Dan Kerwin, 86, minor-league veteran who got into two games as a left-fielder for the 1903 Cincinnati Reds, and went 4-for-6 (.667) in his only MLB action
  - Mark Scott, 45, television play-by-play announcer for the 1956 Cincinnati Redlegs and minor-league Hollywood Stars, and host/producer of the 1959 TV series Home Run Derby, which was discontinued upon his death but remains in syndication
- July 14
  - Al Kellett, 58, pitcher for the Boston Red Sox and Philadelphia Athletics in the 1920s
  - Walter Thornton, 85, pitcher/outfielder for Chicago Colts/Orphans of the National League, 1895–1898; later became a street preacher
- July 17 – Pat Duncan, 66, Cincinnati Reds outfielder who was the first player to homer over Crosley Field's left-field fence
- July 18 – Terry Turner, 79, shortstop for the Cleveland Naps/Indians, who led American League shortstops in fielding percentage four times, ranks among the top 10 Cleveland all-timers in seven different offensive categories, and set team-records with 1,619 games played and 4,603 putouts that still stand
- July 19 – Charlie Whitehouse, 66, southpaw who pitched in 25 games for Indianapolis and Newark (Federal League) in 1914–1915 and Washington (American League) in 1919
- July 28
  - Ken Landenberger, 31, minor league slugger and briefly a first baseman for the 1952 White Sox; manager of the Class D Selma Cloverleafs until mid-July 1960 when, stricken with acute leukemia, he stepped aside; he died by month's end
  - Marty Kavanagh, 69, second baseman for the Detroit Tigers, Cleveland Indians and St. Louis Cardinals in the 1910s
- July 30 – Eugene Jones, 38, left-hander who went 2–0 for 1943 Homestead Grays of the Negro National League
- July 31 – Joe Klinger, 57, first baseman and catcher whose 12-year pro career was interrupted by two very brief MLB stints with 1927 New York Giants and 1930 Chicago White Sox

=== August ===
- August 5 – George Chalmers, 72, native of Scotland and Philadelphia Phillies pitcher from 1910 to 1916, working in 121 games; started and lost Game 4 of the 1915 World Series
- August 11 – Harry McChesney, 80, outfielder who played 22 games for 1904 Chicago Cubs
- August 12
  - Leo Murphy, 71, catcher for the 1915 Pittsburgh Pirates and manager of the AAGPBL Racine Belles
  - Herlen Ragland, 64, southpaw who pitched in 12 games and played outfield in two more during his two years (1920–1921) in the Negro National League
- August 14
  - Fred Clarke, 87, Hall of Fame left fielder (1894–1911, 1913–1915) and player-manager of the Louisville Colonels (NL) and Pittsburgh Pirates (1897–1915) who batted .312 in his career, and became one of the first dozen players to make 2,500 hits and the first manager to win 1,500 games; led Pirates to 1909 World Series title.
  - Henry Keupper, 73, left-hander for the 1914 St. Louis Terriers who led Federal League pitchers in games lost (20) in his only season
- August 15 – Ed Wheeler, 82, infielder who appeared in 30 games for the 1902 Brooklyn Superbas
- August 20 – George Perring, 76, infielder who played 513 games for the 1908–1910 Cleveland Naps (American League) and 1914–1915 Kansas City Packers (Federal League)
- August 21 – John Kelleher, 66, backup infielder for the St. Louis Cardinals, Brooklyn Robins, Chicago Cubs and Boston Braves from 1912 to 1924
- August 22 – Chet Carmichael, 72, pitcher for the 1909 Cincinnati Reds
- August 23 – Jack Leiper, 92, lefty who hurled for the 1891 Columbus Solons of the American Association, then a major league
- August 25 – Fred Crolius, 83, outfielder for Boston and Pittsburgh of the National League in 1901 and 1902, appearing in 58 games in all.

=== September ===
- September 1 – Charlie High, 61, outfielder in 28 games for 1919–1920 Philadelphia Athletics; one of three brothers to play in majors
- September 2 – Billy Maloney, 82, outfielder/catcher who played in 696 games for four clubs between 1901 and 1908
- September 3 – Armando Marsans, 72, Cuban outfielder/first baseman and one of the first men from his native country to play in the majors; appeared in 655 games for four teams between 1911 and 1918
- September 13 – Ralph Mattis, 70, outfielder in 36 games for the 1914 Pittsburgh Rebels (Federal League)
- September 14 – Herman Watts, 40, southpaw who hurled for the New York Black Yankees and Cincinnati–Cleveland Buckeyes of the Negro leagues in 1941–1942
- September 18 – King Brockett, 80, pitcher/outfielder/third baseman who appeared in 54 games (50 on the mound) for the New York Highlanders of 1907, 1909 and 1911
- September 22 – Joe Bernard, 78, pitcher for the 1909 St. Louis Cardinals
- September 23 – Paul Hinson, 56, infielder who pinch-ran in three games for the 1928 Boston Red Sox; later a police officer in Oklahoma
- September 27 – Jim Eschen, 69, outfielder/pinch hitter for 1915 Cleveland Indians who played in 15 midsummer games
- September 28
  - Danny Mahoney, 72, who pinch ran for the Cincinnati Reds on May 15, 1911, and failed to score a run in his lone MLB appearance
  - Joe Martin, 49, third baseman who played eight MLB games for the 1936 New York Giants and 1938 Chicago White Sox
  - Jess Orndorff, 79, catcher for the Boston Doves of the National League in 1907

=== October ===
- October 2
  - Jim Busby, 59, third baseman for the 1933 Indianapolis ABCs of the Negro National League
  - Mike Kilroy, 90, pitcher for 1888 Baltimore Orioles and 1891 Philadelphia Phillies; brother of Matt Kilroy
- October 4 – Jack Warhop, 76, submarine-style pitcher for the New York Highlanders/Yankees who appeared in 221 games between 1908 and 1915
- October 9 – Heavy Johnson, 65, slugging catcher of the Negro leagues between 1920 and 1933; two-time Negro National League batting champion, hitting .370 lifetime, including two seasons (1922, 1923) during which he hit .406; won the league's Triple Crown in 1922
- October 10 – Hub Hart, 82, lefty-swinging backup catcher for the 1905–1907 Chicago White Sox; member of 1906 World Series champions
- October 15 – Jack Wallace, 70, catcher who appeared in two games for 1915 Chicago Cubs
- October 16 – Arch McDonald, 59, broadcaster for the Washington Senators from 1934 to 1956, interrupted by one year (1939) in New York as voice of Yankees and Giants
- October 18 – Irish McIlveen, 80, Belfast-born pitcher/outfielder who appeared in 53 total games for the 1906 Pittsburgh Pirates and 1908–1909 New York Highlanders
- October 19 – Ed McCreery, 70, who posted a 1–0 record (11.25 ERA) in three tilts for the 1914 Detroit Tigers
- October 20 – Lew Groh, 77, veteran minor-league infielder who appeared in two contests at age 35 for the 1919 Philadelphia Athletics; brother of Heinie Groh
- October 21 – Oscar Tuero, 66, Cuban-born pitcher who made 58 appearances for the 1918–1920 St. Louis Cardinals; led 1919 National League hurlers in games pitched (45) and saves (4)
- October 22 – Charlie Hartman, 72, pitcher for the 1908 Boston Red Sox
- October 24 – Wilbur Fisher, 66, minor-league outfielder whose lone MLB appearance came as a pinch hitter for the Pittsburgh Pirates on June 13, 1916

=== November ===
- November 2 – Everett Scott, 67, shortstop, primarily for the Boston Red Sox (1914–1921) and New York Yankees (1922–1925), who played in 1,307 consecutive games from 1916 to 1925, a record later broken by Lou Gehrig; four-time World Series champion, three times as a member of the Red Sox
- November 3 – Bobby Wallace, 86, Hall of Fame shortstop for the Cleveland Spiders (1894–1898), St. Louis Cardinals (1899–1901, 1917–1918) and St. Louis Browns (1902–1916) who set several fielding records; managed the Browns from 1911 to June 1, 1912, and Cincinnati Reds from September 14, 1937, through season's end; scouted for the Reds for 33 years
- November 9 – Al Nixon, 74, outfielder for the Brooklyn Robins (1915–1916, 1918), Boston Braves (1921–1923) and Philadelphia Phillies (1926–1928), appearing in 422 career games
- November 11 – Red Causey, 67, "The Florida Flamingo", pitched in 131 games for the New York Giants, Boston Braves and Philadelphia Phillies from 1918 through 1922
- November 12 – Merle Keagle, 37, All-Star female outfielder who set several single-season records in the All-American Girls Professional Baseball League
- November 15 – Ray Gordinier, 68, right-hander who hurled in eight games for the 1920–1921 Brooklyn Robins
- November 16 – Weldon Henley, 80, pitcher for the Philadelphia Athletics and Brooklyn Superbas from 1903 to 1907, pitched no-hitter on July 22, 1905 against the St. Louis Browns
- November 20 – Frank Brower, 67, outfielder/first baseman who appeared in 340 games for the Washington Senators and Cleveland Indians from 1920 to 1924
- November 24
  - Al Braithwood, 68, southpaw who pitched for the 1915 Pittsburgh Rebels of the "outlaw" Federal League
  - Abbie Johnson, 89, Canadian 19th-century infielder who appeared in 74 games for Louisville of the National League in 1896 and 1897

=== December ===
- December 10 – Ernie Quigley, 80, National League umpire from 1913 to 1937 who worked in six World Series, was later a league supervisor; member, Canadian Baseball Hall of Fame
- December 18 – Art Nehf, 68, pitcher who won 184 games for four National League teams, principally the New York Giants and Boston Braves
- December 20 – Kip Dowd, 71, pitcher for the 1910 Pittsburgh Pirates
- December 22 – Jack Onslow, 72, manager of the Chicago White Sox from 1949 through May 26, 1950, and a longtime coach and scout; previously, catcher in 45 total games for 1912 Detroit Tigers and 1917 New York Giants
- December 26 – Fred Knorr, 47, Michigan-based broadcasting executive and co-owner of the Tigers from 1956 until his death
