= Canadian League (Class D) =

Canadian minor league baseball league

The Canadian League was a minor league baseball league that operated in Canada in the 19th and early 20th centuries.

The first version of the league operated in 1885, then from 1896–1899, becoming a Class-D league in 1899 and merging into the International League in 1900.

In 1905 there was a four-team class D loop known as the Canadian League. Another league using that title ran from 1911 through 1915 — it was originally ranked a D league as well, moved to a C rating a year later and in 1914 got a B classification. Frank Shaughnessy managed the Ottawa team from 1913 to 1915.

The league briefly returned in 1905 and then operated again from 1911 to 1915.

== Team statistics ==
=== 1885 ===
- Guelph, ON: Guelph Maple Leafs
- Hamilton, ON: Hamilton Clippers
- Hamilton, ON: Hamilton Primroses
- London, ON: London Cockneys
- Toronto, ON: Toronto Torontos

| Team | W | L | PCT | GB | Managers |
|---|---|---|---|---|---|
| Hamilton Clippers | 34 | 10 | .773 | 0 | William Stroud |
| London Cockneys | 27 | 12 | .692 | 4.5 | Fred Goldsmith |
| Toronto Torontos | 24 | 20 | .545 | 10 | Harry Spence |
| Guelph Maple Leafs | 8 | 28 | .222 | 22 | George Sleeman? |
| Hamilton Primroses | 8 | 31 | .205 | 23.5 | Jimmy Henigan |

=== 1899 ===
- Chatham, Ontario (ON): Chatham Reds
- Guelph, ON: Guelph Maple Leafs
- Hamilton, ON: Hamilton Blackbirds
- London, ON: London Cockneys
- St. Thomas, ON: St. Thomas Saints
- Stratford, ON: Stratford
- Woodstock, ON: Woodstock

1899 Canadian League
Secretary: Cal Davis

| Team | W | L | PCT | GB | Managers |
|---|---|---|---|---|---|
| London Cockneys | 64 | 28 | .696 | 0 | Pete Lohman |
| Hamilton Blackbirds | 49 | 43 | .533 | 15 | Bill Collins |
| Guelph Maple Leafs | 42 | 48 | .467 | 21 | Bob Black |
| Stratford #Woodstock | 34 | 53 | .391 | 27.5 | NA |
| Chatham Reds ## | 19 | 23 | .452 | NA | Leslie Snyder |
| St. Thomas Saints ## | 11 | 24 | .314 | NA | Joe Knight |

#Stratford (5–20) moved to Woodstock June 8.
##Chatham and St. Thomas disbanded July 4.

Player Statistics
| Player | Team | Stat | Tot | Player | Team | Stat | Tot |
|---|---|---|---|---|---|---|---|
| Bunk Congalton | Hamilton | BA | .391 | Thomas Cooper | London | W | 23 |
| Kid Mohler | London | Runs | 73 | Thomas Cooper | London | SO | 103 |
| Billy Reed | London | Hits | 99 | Thomas Cooper | London | Pct | .885: 23–3 |

Home Runs, four players tied with 5.

=== 1905 ===
- Brantford, ON: Brantford Indians
- Ingersoll, ON: Ingersoll
- St. Thomas, ON: St. Thomas Saints
- Simcoe, ON: Simcoe
- Woodstock, ON: Woodstock Maroons

1905 D Canadian League
President: NA

| Team | W | L | PCT | GB | Managers |
|---|---|---|---|---|---|
| Woodstock Maroons | 48 | 32 | .600 | 0 | Will Roche |
| Ingersoll | 45 | 38 | .542 | 4.5 | Weldon |
| St. Thomas Saints | 39 | 39 | .500 | 8 | Ponsford |
| Brantford Indians | 31 | 38 | .449 | 11.5 | Watty Lee |
| Simcoe # | 10 | 27 | .270 | NA | Barwell |

#Simcoe disbanded around July 15.
No Individual Statistics Available.

=== 1911–1915 ===
- Berlin, ON: Berlin Green Sox 1911; Berlin Busy Bees 1912–1913
- Brantford, ON: Brantford Red Sox 1911–1915
- Erie, PA: Erie Yankees 1914
- Guelph, ON: Guelph Maple Leafs 1911–1913; Guelph Maple Leafs 1915
- Hamilton, ON: Hamilton Kolts 1911–1912; Hamilton Hams 1913–1915
- London, ON: London Cockneys 1911; London Tecumsehs 1912–1915
- Ottawa, ON: Ottawa Senators 1912–1915
- Peterborough, ON: Peterborough White Caps 1912; Peterborough Petes 1913–1914
- St. Thomas, ON: St. Thomas Saints 1911–1915
- Toronto, ON: Toronto Beavers 1914

1911 D Canadian League
President: Donald Ferguson

| Team | W | L | PCT | GB | Managers |
|---|---|---|---|---|---|
| Berlin Green Sox | 70 | 40 | .637 | 0 | George Deneau |
| London Cockneys | 59 | 51 | .536 | 11 | Lou Bierbauer / Jim Keenan |
| Hamilton Kolts | 58 | 52 | .527 | 12 | Watty Lee |
| Bradford Red Sox | 53 | 58 | .477 | 17.5 | Harry Kane |
| Guelph Maple Leafs | 45 | 62 | .421 | 23.5 | Abbie Johnson / William Lane / Frank Shannon |
| St. Thomas Saints | 43 | 65 | .398 | 26 | Chaucer Elliott |

No Playoffs Scheduled.

Player Statistics
| Player | Team | Stat | Tot | Player | Team | Stat | Tot |
|---|---|---|---|---|---|---|---|
| Lou Bierbauer | London | BA | .367 | Shad Barry | Brantford | Hits | 141 |
| Jack Cameron | Berlin | Runs | 89 | Harry Kane | Brantford | HR | 7 |

1912 C Canadian League
President: J. P. Fitzgerald

| Team | W | L | PCT | GB | Managers |
|---|---|---|---|---|---|
| Ottawa Senators | 63 | 35 | .643 | 0 | Doc Cook |
| Brantford Red Sox | 54 | 44 | .551 | 9 | Harry Kane |
| Hamilton Kolts | 51 | 46 | .526 | 11.5 | Watty Lee |
| London Tecumsehs | 48 | 49 | .495 | 14.5 | Frank Bowerman / Jimmy Barrett |
| St. Thomas Saints | 46 | 50 | .479 | 16 | Joe Stewart |
| Berlin Busy Bees | 42 | 50 | .457 | 18 | George Deneau |
| Guelph Maple Leafs | 39 | 51 | .433 | 20 | George Needham / Fred Applegate |
| Peterborough Whitecaps | 40 | 58 | .408 | 23 | Curtis Templin / Dave Rowan |

No Playoffs Scheduled.

Player Statistics
| Player | Team | Stat | Tot | Player | Team | Stat | Tot |
|---|---|---|---|---|---|---|---|
| Jack Fryer | Guelph | BA | .372 | Pat Hynes | London | W | 19 |
| Frank Burke | Ottawa | Runs | 79 | Tom Donovan | Brantford | SO | 138 |
| Harry Corns | Hamilton | Hits | 113 | Joe McManus | Ottawa | Pct | .875; 14–2 |

1913 C Canadian League
President: J. P. Fitzgerald

| Team | W | L | PCT | GB | Managers |
|---|---|---|---|---|---|
| Ottawa Senators | 66 | 39 | .629 | 0 | Frank Shaughnessy |
| London Tecumsehs | 64 | 39 | .621 | 1 | George Deneau |
| St. Thomas Saints | 56 | 48 | .538 | 9.5 | Al Orth |
| Peterborough Petes | 55 | 48 | .534 | 10 | John Barthold |
| Guelph Maple Leafs | 54 | 49 | .524 | 11 | Doc Cook |
| Hamilton Hams | 52 | 52 | .500 | 13.5 | Watty Lee |
| Berlin Busy Bees | 38 | 66 | .365 | 27.5 | Jim Keenan |
| Brantford Red Sox | 30 | 74 | .288 | 35.5 | Harry Kane / Bill Wagner |

No Playoffs Scheduled.

Player Statistics
| Player | Team | Stat | Tot | Player | Team | Stat | Tot |
|---|---|---|---|---|---|---|---|
| Bill Wright | Guelph | BA | .396 | Bob Heck | London | W | 24 |
| Merlin Kopp | St. Thomas | Runs | 104 | Erwin Renfer | Ottawa | SO | 185 |
| Bill Wright | Guelph | Hits | 152 | Bob Heck | London | Pct | .800; 24–6 |
| Bill Wright | Guelph | HR | 10 | | | | |

1914 B Canadian League
President: J. P. Fitzgerald

| Team | W | L | PCT | GB | Managers |
|---|---|---|---|---|---|
| Ottawa Senators | 76 | 45 | .628 | 0 | Frank Shaughnessy |
| London Tecumsehs | 71 | 43 | .623 | 1.5 | Frank Reisling |
| Erie Yankees | 64 | 57 | .529 | 12 | Charlie Smith / Frank Gygli |
| Toronto Beavers | 55 | 55 | .500 | 15.5 | Jim Keenan / Watty Lee |
| St. Thomas Saints | 48 | 60 | .444 | 21.5 | Al Orth / Midge Craven |
| Peterborough Petes | 49 | 62 | .441 | 22 | John Barthold / Curley Blount |
| Hamilton Hams | 47 | 66 | .416 | 25 | Robert Yates / Jack White |
| Brantford Red Sox | 46 | 68 | .404 | 26.5 | Bill Wagner / George Deneau |

No Playoffs Scheduled.

Player Statistics
| Player | Team | Stat | Tot | Player | Team | Stat | Tot |
|---|---|---|---|---|---|---|---|
| J. Trout | Toronto | BA | .349 | Urban Shocker | Ottawa | W | 20 |
| Rex Dawson | Erie | Runs | 90 | Lou Shettler | Peterborough | W | 20 |
| Owen Harris | Erie | Hits | 138 | Lou Shettler | Peterborough | SO | 174 |
| George Deneau | Brantford | HR | 7 | Joe McManus | Ottawa | Pct | .875; 14–2 |

1915 B Canadian League
President: J. P. Fitzgerald

| Team | W | L | PCT | GB | Managers |
|---|---|---|---|---|---|
| Ottawa Senators | 72 | 39 | .649 | 0 | Frank Shaughnessy |
| Guelph Maple Leafs | 59 | 51 | .537 | 12.5 | Watty Lee |
| Hamilton Hams/Tigers | 55 | 48 | .534 | 13 | Bill Cristall / Gus Ziemer |
| Brantford Red Sox | 52 | 55 | .485 | 18 | George Deneau / John Warner |
| London Tecumsehs | 50 | 58 | .463 | 20.5 | Doc Reisling / Walter Hartwell |
| St. Thomas Saints | 38 | 75 | .337 | 35 | Mark Stewart / Lou Bierbauer |

No Playoffs Scheduled.

Player Statistics
| Player | Team | Stat | Tot | Player | Team | Stat | Tot |
|---|---|---|---|---|---|---|---|
| Ralph Burrill | Brantford | BA | .344 | Urban Shocker | Ottawa | W | 15 |
| Buzz Murphy | Guelph | Runs | 66 | Urban Shocker | Ottawa | SO | 186 |
| D.J. Bullock | Ottawa | Hits | 130 | Tom Caesar | London | Pct | .727; 8–3 |

== League records, 1911–1915 ==
Batting
| Player | Team | Stat | Tot | Yr | Player | Team | Stat | Tot | Yr |
|---|---|---|---|---|---|---|---|---|---|
| Frank Dolan | Ottawa | GA | 125 | 14 | Bill Wright | Guelph | BA | .396 | 13 |
| Frank Shaughnessy | Ottawa | AB | 446 | 14 | Merlin Kopp | St. Thomas | RUNS | 104 | 13 |
| Bill Wright | Guelph | HITS | 152 | 13 | Hackenbush | Hamilton | 2B | 28 | 11 |
| E.T. Rogers | Ottawa | 3B | 16 | 13 | Bill Wright | Guelph | HR | 10 | 13 |
| Bill Wright | Guelph | EBH | 44 | 13 | Bill Wright | Guelph | TB | 231 | 13 |
| Matty Matteson | London | SAC | 36 | 13 | A.E. Schwind | Ottawa | SAC | 36 | 12 |
| Merlin Kopp | St. Thomas | SB | 63 | 13 | Merlin Kopp | St. Thomas | BB | 83 | 13 |
| George Deneau | London | SO | 71 | 13 | | | | | |

Pitching
| Player | Team | Stat | Tot | Yr | Player | Team | Stat | Tot | Yr |
|---|---|---|---|---|---|---|---|---|---|
| Urban Shocker | Ottawa | GA | 36 | 14 | Ernest Chase | Brantford | CG | 26 | 14 |
| Ray Keating | Hamilton | W | 25 | 13 | Howick | St. Thomas | L | 20 | 15 |
| Bob Heck | London | PCT | .800 | 13 | Urban Shocker | Ottawa | IP | 303 | 15 |
| Joe McManus | Ottawa | WS | 14 | 12 | Urban Shocker | Ottawa | SO | 186 | 15 |
| Joe Lill | Ottawa/Brantford | BB | 140 | 13 | | | | | |
