= Abby Johnson =

Abby, Abbie or Abigail Johnson may refer to:

- Abigail Johnson (born 1961), American businesswoman and president and CEO of Fidelity Investments
- Abby Johnson (activist) (born 1980), 2007 Planned Parenthood Employee of the year turned anti-abortion activist
- Abbie Johnson (1871–1960), Canadian-born Major League Baseball player
- Abby Arthur Johnson, American historian
