= Toshiharu Ai =

Japanese baseball player (born 1935)

- Catcher
- Born: June 6, 1935 (age 90); Shizuoka Prefecture, Japan
- Bats: Right Throws: Right

Teams
- Kokutetsu Swallows (1954–1960)

Toshiharu Ai (阿井利治, Ai Toshiharu; born June 6, 1935 in Shizuoka Prefecture, Japan) is a former Japanese Nippon Professional Baseball catcher. He played for the Kokutetsu Swallows from 1954 to 1960.
