= Berlin Busy Bees =

- 1911–1913; Berlin, Ontario

Minor league affiliations
- Previous classes: C, D
- League: Canadian League

Minor league titles
- League titles: 1911

Team data
- Previous names: Berlin Busy Bees; Berlin Green Sox Berlin Dutchmen
- Previous parks: Victoria Park

The Berlin Busy Bees (also known as the Berlin Green Sox and the Berlin Dutchmen) were a minor league baseball team in Berlin (renamed as Kitchener), Ontario that played in the Canadian League from 1911 through 1913. The league was classified as Class D in 1911 and as Class C from 1912 through 1913. The team's owner from 1911 to 1912 was William J. "Pop" Williams; in the winter of 1912–13 he sold the team for $2,000 to the Twin Cities Athletic Association, headed by Dr. F. H. Kalbfleisch. The team played its home games in Victoria Park.

The 1911 team easily won the Canadian League pennant with a record of 70–40, 11 games ahead of second-place London. The team's manager and first baseman was George "Rube" Deneau. Their shortstop, Raymond "Scotty" Cameron, was described as the "fastest man in the league", and was compared with Joe Tinker; he hit .341 and stole 48 bases. At the end of the season, he was drafted by the Philadelphia Athletics.

In 1912, the league was expanded from six teams to eight and was reclassified as Class C. Deneau returned as manager, but the Berlin team had lost six players to major league teams. The team finished in sixth place with a 42–50 record, and the owner, Williams, announced that he had lost money and would sell the team.

In 1913, Joseph Keenan took over as manager. The team failed to improved its record, going 37–67 to finish in seventh place. After the season, the Canadian League dropped the Berlin franchise, replacing it with a team in Toronto, and moved the Guelph franchise to Erie, Pennsylvania, as the bid to upgrade the league to Class B status. After the season, catcher Wickey McAvoy was drafted by the Philadelphia Athletics.
