= Mike Ramsey (outfielder) =

American baseball player (born 1960)

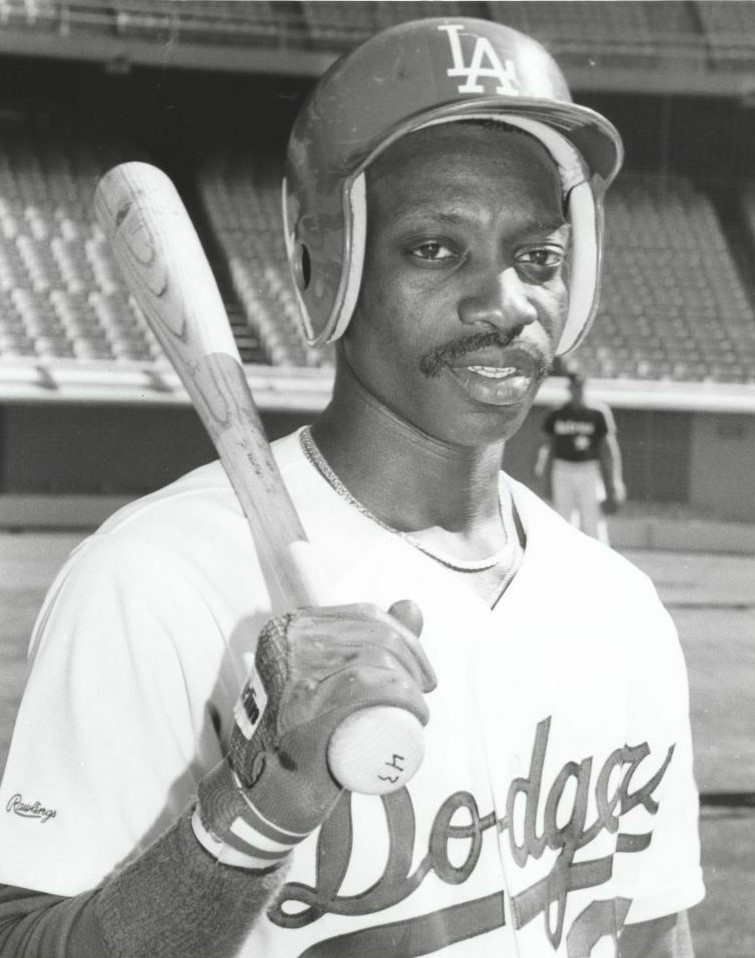
- Center fielder
- Born: July 8, 1960 (age 65); Harlem, Georgia, U.S.
- Batted: Switch Threw: Left

MLB debut
- April 6, 1987, for the Los Angeles Dodgers

Last MLB appearance
- October 3, 1987, for the Los Angeles Dodgers

MLB statistics
- Batting average: .232
- Home runs: 0
- Runs: 18
- Stats at Baseball Reference

Teams
- Los Angeles Dodgers (1987)

Michael James Ramsey (born July 8. 1960) is an American former professional baseball center fielder who played for the Los Angeles Dodgers of the Major League Baseball (MLB).

== Career ==
Ramsey was signed as an undrafted free agent by the Cincinnati Reds on May 20, 1979, and played in the Reds minor league system for three years before he was traded to the Los Angeles Dodgers in 1982 for Ted Power.

After three seasons in the Dodgers farm system with the Vero Beach Dodgers, San Antonio Dodgers and Albuquerque Dukes, he made the Dodgers opening day starting lineup in 1987. He went 2 for 4 as the starting center fielder that day. He played in 48 games with the Dodgers in 1987, finishing with a .232 average. He was returned to the minors and spent the next two seasons with the minor league teams of the Dodgers, Milwaukee Brewers and California Angels before retiring from baseball following the 1989 season.
