= Joe McManus (baseball) =

American baseball player (1887–1955)

- Pitcher
- Born: September 7, 1887; Palmyra, Illinois, U.S.
- Died: December 23, 1955 (aged 68); Beckley, West Virginia, U.S.
- Batted: Right Threw: Right

MLB debut
- April 12, 1913, for the Cincinnati Reds

Last MLB appearance
- April 12, 1913, for the Cincinnati Reds

MLB statistics
- Win–loss record: 0–0
- Earned run average: 18.00
- Strikeouts: 1
- Stats at Baseball Reference

Teams
- Cincinnati Reds (1913)

Joab Logan "Joe" McManus (September 7, 1887 – December 23, 1955) was an American professional baseball pitcher who played in one game for the Cincinnati Reds on April 12, 1913.
