= Merlin Kopp =

American baseball player (1892-1960)

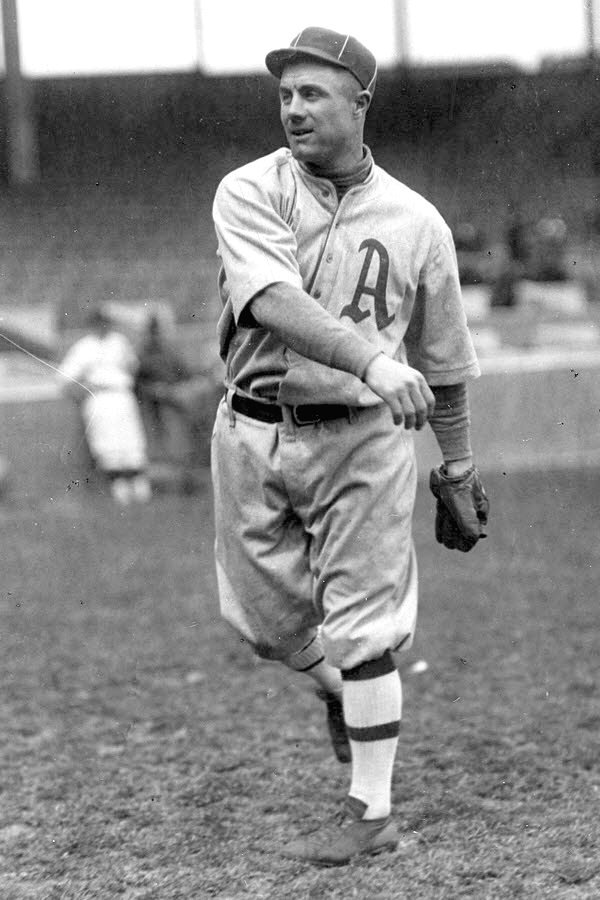
- Outfielder
- Born: January 2, 1892; Toledo, Ohio, U.S.
- Died: May 6, 1960 (aged 68); Sacramento, California, U.S.
- Batted: Switch Threw: Right

MLB debut
- August 2, 1915, for the Washington Senators

Last MLB appearance
- September 29, 1919, for the Philadelphia Athletics

MLB statistics
- Batting average: .232
- Home runs: 1
- Runs batted in: 30
- Stats at Baseball Reference

Teams
- Washington Senators (1915); Philadelphia Athletics (1918–1919)

Merlin Henry Kopp (January 2, 1892 – May 6, 1960) was an American Major League Baseball outfielder. He played the end of 1915 for the Washington Senators, then all of 1918 and 1919 for the Philadelphia Athletics.

Kopp also had an extensive minor league baseball career. In all, he played eighteen seasons professionally, from 1911 until 1928. He spent most of his career with the St. Thomas Saints of the Canadian League (1911–15) and the Sacramento Senators of the Pacific Coast League (1920–28).

== Sources ==
- Career statistics from Baseball Reference · Baseball Reference (Minors) · Retrosheet · Baseball Almanac
