= Bob Fagan =

American baseball player

- Second baseman
- Born: March 27, 1894; Henderson, Kentucky, U.S.
- Died: January 19, 1960 (aged 65); Fort Worth, Texas, U.S.
- Batted: Right Threw: Right

Negro league baseball debut
- 1921, for the Kansas City Monarchs

Last appearance
- 1923, for the St. Louis Stars
- Stats at Baseball Reference

Teams
- Kansas City Monarchs (1921); St. Louis Stars (1923)

Robert William Fagan (March 27, 1894 – January 19, 1960) was an American Negro league second baseman in the 1920s.

A native of Henderson, Kentucky, Fagan played for the Kansas City Monarchs in 1921, and for the St. Louis Stars in 1923. He died in Fort Worth, Texas in 1960 at age 65.
