= Abby Arthur Johnson =

American historian

Abby Ann Arthur Johnson (1941-2024) was a writer and educator.

Born in Duluth, Minnesota, she earned a B.A. from Gustavus Adolphus College, an M.A. from the University of Kansas, and a PhD in English from the University of Illinois. She worked at Howard University's English department. She co-authored books with her husband, historian Ronald Maberry Johnson, who has taught at Georgetown University's history department. They wrote books about African American magazines and the Congressional Cemetery. She wrote written articles on Jessie Redmon Fauset and the Harlem Renaissance as well as Margaret C. Anderson and the Little Review.

== Work ==
The Johnsons' book Propaganda and Aesthetics: the Literary Politics of Afro-American Magazines in the Twentieth Century examined the history of Afro-American magazines.

In 2012, the Johnsons published In The Shadow of the United States Capitol: Congressional Cemetery and the Memory of the Nation which details the history of the Congressional Cemetery.

== Writings ==
=== Books ===
- Propaganda and Aesthetics: the Literary Politics of Afro-American Magazines in the Twentieth Century by Abby Arthur Johnson and Ronald Maberry Johnson, University of Massachusetts Press 1979
- In The Shadow of the United States Capitol: Congressional Cemetery and the Memory of the Nation with Ronald Maberry Johnson 2012

=== Articles ===
- 1973 doctoral dissertation at the University of Michigan
- "The Promise of Baptism: Art Introduction to Baptism in Scripture and the Reformed Tradition" 1976
- "Literary Midwife: Jessie Redmon Fauset and the Harlem Renaissance"
- "Forgotten Pages: Black Literary Magazines in the 1920s" Journal of American Studies 1974 and published online by Cambridge University Press: 16 January 2009
- "The Personal Magazine: Margaret C. Anderson and the Little Review, 1914–1929"
