= Eddie Wall =

American baseball player

- Pitcher
- Born: August 16, 1903; St. Louis, Missouri, U.S.
- Died: July 4, 1960 (aged 56); St. Louis, Missouri, U.S.
- Threw: Left

Negro league baseball debut
- 1926, for the Cleveland Elites

Last appearance
- 1926, for the Cleveland Elites

Teams
- Cleveland Elites (1926)

Edward Wall (August 16, 1903 – July 4, 1960) was an American Negro league pitcher in the 1920s.

A native of St. Louis, Missouri, Wall played for the Cleveland Elites in 1926. In eight recorded games, he recorded one hit in eight plate appearances. Wall died in St. Louis in 1960 at the age of 56.
