= George "Rube" Deneau =

Canadian baseball player, manager, and promoter

George Deneau (died January 10, 1926) was a Canadian minor league baseball player, manager, and promoter who played on a number of Ontario and Michigan teams between 1898 and 1915. Known best by his nickname "Rube," he was born in Amherstburg, Ontario, about 20 miles downriver from Windsor, and died in 1926 at the age of 47. He was remarkably popular with fans in his day, and newspaper reports routinely refer to the teams he was on as "Deneau's Boys," "the Deneauites," and (projecting his large build onto the entire team) "Deneau's huskies."

Deneau was primarily a pitcher but he also did well as a position player. His lifetime batting average (based on professional league games only) was .275 over ten seasons, 780 games, and 2918 at-bats. Of his 803 hits, 98 were doubles, 16 triples, and 22 home runs. Slugging percentage: .241. On-base percentage: .275.

== Early Career in Windsor, 1898-1905 ==
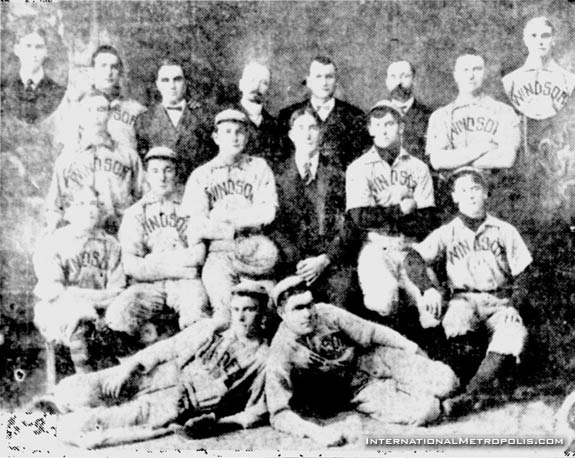
The Windsors in 1922: Deneau is in the second row, in the suit.

As early as 1898, the right-hander's play with local teams began to attract the attention of scouts. Professional offers started rolling in by 1901 from teams such as Detroit, Philadelphia, and Buffalo, but for several years he turned them all down, preferring to work in Windsor as a diver. By 1902 Deneau was pitcher-manager of the Windsors baseball team, of Windsor, Ontario. In 1903, the team won 19 of the 23 games it played against semi-professional teams all over Western Ontario and Michigan. In that same year he added to his fame when he recovered the body of a small boy who had drowned in the Detroit River; previous efforts to drag the river for the child had been unsuccessful.

In 1904 he was on the Detroit Tigers payroll as a "try-out" but did not make the roster. He did get at least one paid gig with the Merrill, Michigan, team, which was in the habit of salting the line-up with professionals. After the regular season, Deneau found ways to keep playing baseball. In October he played for the amateur Crickets of Windsor's neighboring community Walkerville, and in December he helped set up an indoor baseball league for the 21st Essex Fusiliers, the forerunner of the Essex Scottish Regiment, with a team for each of the eight companies comprised by the regiment. Rube also managed, coached, and captained a regimental team, drawn from the best of the eight companies.

In the 1905 season Deneau played for three different teams. In March he re-signed with the Windsors, who the Detroit Free Press said had been the "terror" of the region for the past two years with Deneau as their "star twirler and manager." He also played for Saginaw against other Michigan teams; the Detroit Free Press reported him pitching for that team on June 21 (losing 3-2 before 300 fans) and for Norris, the winningest team in the City League, on Sept. 18 and Oct. 4 (winning the latter 3-0, attendance 175).

In December, Deneau was back to work on indoor baseball. The Free Press reported there was "a split" in the Fusiliers team and that Deneau was thinking of putting together an independent indoor team to participate in the new indoor league being planned in Detroit.

== Jackson Convicts, 1906 ==
In 1906 Deneau left Windsor for the Jackson, Michigan, based Jackson Convicts team in the Southern Michigan League — as a pitcher and for part of the season as manager. Newly formed this year by Deneau and others, Southern Michigan was a Class D league under a classification system that ran from D up to AAA. Rube played 82 games for Jackson, with a batting average of 281.

Notwithstanding his Jackson perch, Deneau pitched the last three innings for Windsor's opening game in Williams Park against the Detroit Magnolias. (He gave up no runs and struck out two. Windsor won, 10-2, even with 10 runners left on base. Attendance was 800.) Deneau also returned to Windsor on May 13, this time pitching a complete game for Jackson against his old team with 8 strikeouts. He also ran home on a third-baseman's error in the sixth inning and drove in the two winning runs with a triple in the ninth. Jackson took the game 7-6 in front of a crowd 400.

A bad shoulder hindered Deneau's pitching in the first half of the season, but he improved in the second. In the season finale he pitched a complete game for Jackson against Saginaw, winning 7 to 2 before 1200 fans. The very next day the Free Press announced that he had signed with the Pontiac team to play the remainder of its season.

== Springfield Senators, 1907 ==
At the end of 1906, Deneau signed for the following season with the Springfield (Illinois) Senators of the Class B Illinois–Indiana–Iowa League (often called "The 3-I League") "at one of the best salaries paid a pitcher in the organization."

Deneau kept up his baseball even in the dead of winter, appearing in a baseball game on ice at a Detroit skating rink in February 1907. In March the Springfield Senators were negotiating with the Detroit Tigers to acquire Henry Steiger, a left-handed pitcher to complement Deneau the rightie. But by April he had a serious problem with his pitching arm, possibly related to last year's bad shoulder. He wrote to the Free Press early in the month that it had "swelled to twice its size" and could remain a problem through the first half of the season.

== Battle Creek Crickets, 1907-1908 ==
By May 1907, Deneau was playing not with Springfield but with the Battle Creek Crickets of the Southern Michigan League, "playing any old place from catcher to first, second, third, or short." Baseball-Reference.Com's records for the Southern Michigan League list James Henderson as the manager, but Deneau must have been at least the captain: at season's end the Free Press was referring to the Crickets as "the Deneauites," noting that Battle Creek had Deneau on reserve for 1908.

One blot on the Battle Creek season was the suspension of shortstop Curly Henderson on suspicion of throwing the game with a wild throw to Deneau at first. Henderson, who claimed that the ball went only a foot above Deneau's head and should have been caught, vowed never to return to Battle Creek.

For the season at Battle Creek, the Free Press reported Deneau's batting average as .275 with a fielding percentage of .976. But Baseball-Reference.Com says his batting average this year was .250, .352 slugging. The Crickets played a number of exhibition games; if the Free Press was counting those in its calculations that might explain the discrepancy. As a pitcher Rube had 15 games, won 9, lost 3. The team placed third (of 8) in the league, with an average of .563.

On April 26, 1908, Battle Creek's Crickets played their first exhibition game against the Battle Creek Independents. Rube Deneau was the manager of the Crickets and had 12 players on board, including Curly Henderson, who must have had a change of heart. Deneau did not pitch this first game, but in June he was reported as the losing pitcher in a Free Press article on a game between the Crickets and Flint. As a player, Deneau earned a .288 batting average over 124 games. He pitched 19 games, winning 6 and losing 8. The team placed only 6th in the 9-team league, with an average of .496.

== The Windsors, 1909 ==
In February 1909 Deneau met with other baseball people in Michigan and Ontario about forming a Border League to comprise Windsor, Pontiac, Port Huron, Monroe, Mt. Clemens, and possibly Chatham. Deneau would play for Windsor if he could get out of his Battle Creek contract. Windsor had just built a new park that the team could use (it was named "Wigle Park" later in the year), and most of the other cities had good facilities. On Feb. 26, Deneau organized a public gathering at Windsor's Crawford House to drum up support for the league. But in April the Windsor Evening Record was reporting that "chances are not bright for the Border league." Without league membership, the Windsor team would play as amateurs. With or without league membership it would be led by Deneau as manager.

On May 24, Windsor inaugurated the new park with a game against "semi-professional" Mt. Clemens (which was no longer in the Southern Michigan League), winning 6-5 in the bottom of the 9th. Deneau played first base and had two hits, one a double. In the early method of box scoring used by the newspapers of the day he was credited with 7 "outs"—apparently the catcher or first baseman was credited with the out that follows the third strike.

June 16 was Deneau Day at Wigle Park. Over 1200 fans bought tickets for a game between Windsor and the Good Lucks from Detroit, all the proceeds to go to Rube Deneau, "who is very popular in this city." Four days later with Deneau on first the team beat the Detroit Spaldings 4-0 at home, attendance 187. On July 10 Deneau pitched the second game of a series against the Old Athletics, allowing no runs after the first inning and winning the game 4-2. By July 17 his arm and his team were stronger than ever in a 19-5 rout of Detroit's Woodmere club before 314 fans. Deneau was credited with a triple. He and a player named Delaney alternated pitching and first-base duties.

On July 22 a scheduled game against the Detroit Athletic Club was cancelled because "the majority of Deneau's men are busy at the race track this week and are unable to get away to play ball." On the 28th they were drubbed by Detroit's Cass team, with Delaney and the hitless Deneau again alternating at first base and the pitcher's mound. On the 31st, they beat Detroit Business Institute 2-1, attendance 225. Deneau managed but did not play. On August 5, 4000 fans came out for a day of athletic competitions that culminated with Rube pitching a complete game against Chatham, striking out four batters and scoring two runs himself. Windsor won, 8-3. The team beat Chatham again on the morning of the 18th in a tournament at Leamington before 950 fans, with Deneau at shortstop. In the afternoon the "bulky leader" of the team was on the mound against the Detroit Athletic Club, which was beaten 8-5. Deneau struck out four and scored one of the runs.

In late August and early September, Deneau seems to have been on some kind of leave. A game scheduled for the 24th against the Detroit Athletic Club was canceled because he "finds it necessary to be out of town part of this week." Then on Sept. 12 a company team from Detroit came to Windsor "for the purpose of taking a look at Rube Deneau's slants," but he was not with the team for that game either. On the 21st, the sports page of the Free Press carried a message: "Rube Deneau is requested to call Manager Batchelor, of the D. A. C. [Detroit Athletic Club], this evening after 7 o'clock at Main 6200."

Deneau's absences may have been due to his extracurricular (and presumably paid) work with the Saginaw Wa-was, who ended in first place in the Southern Michigan League that year. While at Saginaw he registered 24 hits on 89 at-bats for a .270 batting average. At the end of the year Saginaw businessmen took up a Christmas collection for 17 members of the team. Rube was one of them and received a check for $16.70, which at the time would have been enough to buy a new suit or overcoat.

== Bay City, 1910 ==
In 1910, Deneau played in the Southern Michigan League for Bay City, Michigan. Hosting the Lansing Senators on August 30 he ended a 16-inning standoff in the first game by stealing home and later scored the winning (and only) run in the second game by stealing home in the sixth inning. His batting average at Bay City was .257 (slugging .353) on 102 games and 374 at-bats. The team ended the season with a .421 average, placing 6th among the 8 teams. Deneau also did some occasional umpiring in Windsor for the newly formed Trolley League and played for Walkerville after Bay City's season was finished.

== Berlin Green Sox, 1911-1912 ==
In 1911 Deneau managed the Green Sox of Berlin, Ontario (later renamed Kitchener) to a pennant-winning 70-40 record in the Class D Canadian League (London, Hamilton, Guelph, St. Thomas, Brantford). At Berlin he played 103 games, mostly at first base, earning a .297 batting average and a .427 slugging percentage.

The team's stellar record notwithstanding, owner "Pop" Williams just broke even financially. The problem was that Berlin's Victoria Park was not big enough to accommodate the numbers the team needed to stay in the black. Deneau thought a move to Windsor might be in order, for Wigle Park was, in the words of the Windsor Evening Record, "one of the best baseball diamonds in Ontario." So after the regular season he took the Green Sox to the Windsor area for exhibitions against local teams and encouraged Windsor leaders to consider adopting the team. He also led a Canadian League all-star team that played exhibition games in the border area. As 1912 began there was no movement in Windsor for adopting the Green Sox, and Berlin authorities were dragging their feet on the prospect of expanding the facilities at Victoria Park. In February Deneau and "Pop" Williams negotiated with the city of Waterloo about moving the Berlin team there. Nothing came of that, but by April construction had begun on improvements to the Berlin field and Deneau was hiring men to replace the six from last year who had been snapped up by the majors.

On May 11 the Berlin team came to Windsor for the latter's opening exhibition game at Wigle Park. Deneau's team sported "the niftiest uniform in the league" and a new name, the Busy Bees. There was a bump in the road when the Ontario Municipal and Railway Board ruled that public moneys could not be spent on the Victoria Park improvements without a referendum. However, construction continued and all animosities crumbled at the season opener in Berlin, where Deneau was given a rousing welcome by 1500 fans, with a regimental band, a procession of leading citizens, and a presentation to Rube of "a monster bouquet and bag of gold." As the always adulatory Evening Record put it, "to show that his heart was in the right place [Deneau] won his game by 3 to 2" against the Brantford Red Sox.

The league itself was upgraded this year to Class C and expanded to eight teams: Ottawa, Brantford, Hamilton, London, St. Thomas, Berlin, Guelph, and Peterborough.

During the season Deneau continued to be the Renaissance Man of the diamond, serving as manager, utility outfielder, and sometime pitcher. He pinch-hit in one game against Ottawa on June 4 and in another on the 14th scored four runs on three hits and started a triple play. He pitched a total of 57 innings, was the pitcher of record in 9 games, won only 1 of them and lost 4. He batted 237 times for a .274 average in 63 games. However, the loss of those six men to the majors weighed heavily on the team. It ended up at 6th place in the 8-team league, with a .457 percentage.

After the season, Deneau again organized a league all-star team that barnstormed the Ontario-Michigan area.

== London Tecumsehs, 1913 ==
In 1913 all the Canadian League teams had new or reshuffled managers except Brantford and Hamilton. Deneau was traded to the London Tecumsehs. (The team had changed its name from the "Cockneys" in 1912, but newspapers continued to use the old name in their reports.) Rube came on as manager, pitcher, and utility outfielder. The league also instituted a new salary limit of $150 a month, which had been just an ordinary player's salary last season.

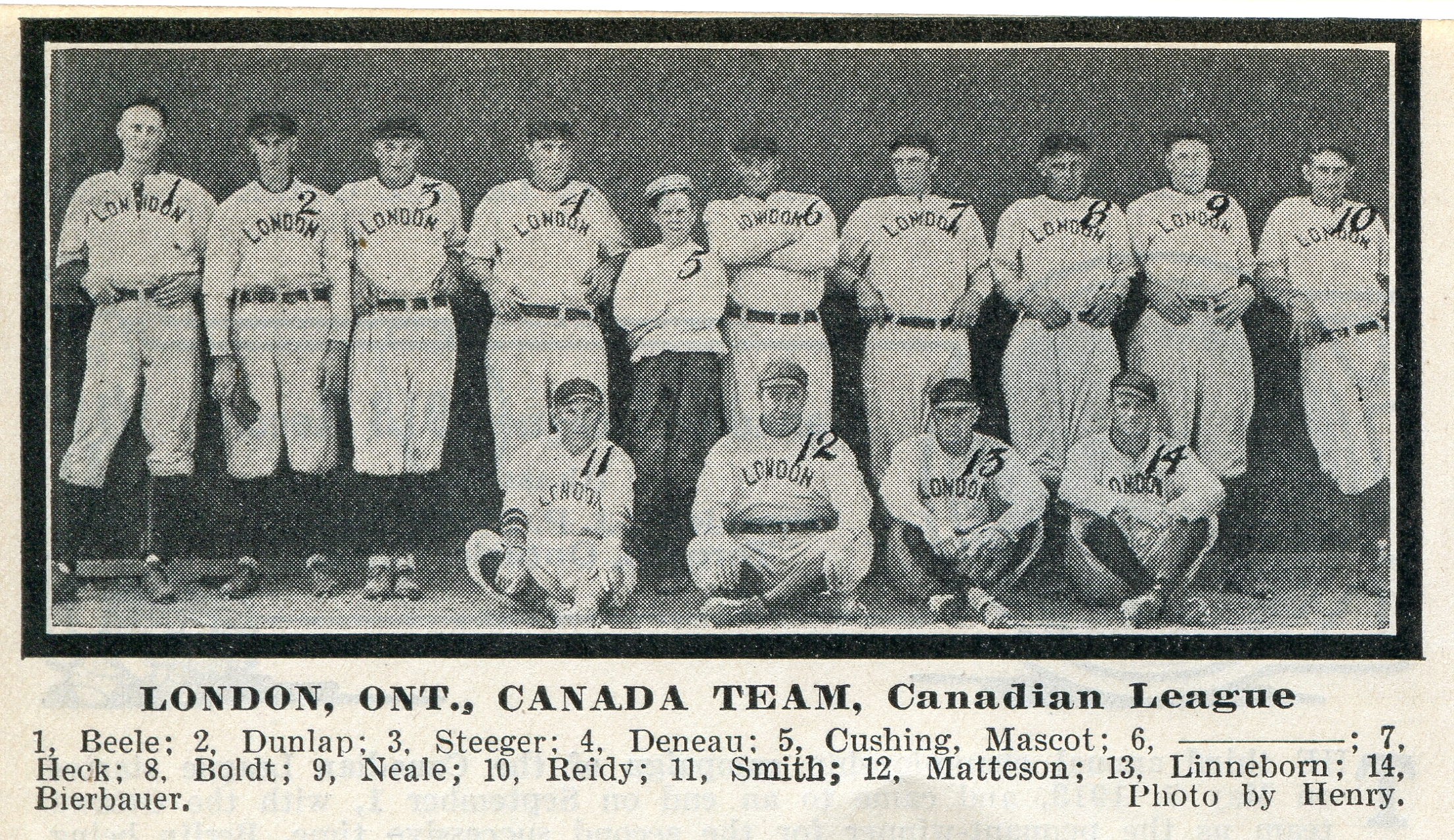
The London Tecumsehs in 1913 (Click for full size photo.)

On July 27, London was leading the league but lost to Ottawa 3-1. In the game "Manager Rube Deneau got into a row with Umpire Jocko Halligan, the London chief claiming that the Senators were putting licorice on the ball to prevent [London pitcher Bobby] Heck's spitball from working. Halligan examined the ball and tossed it back into play."

By August 23 Ottawa was leading London in the standings .650 to .593. On that day the teams played a double-header in Ottawa that Halligan later called "the most exciting game of baseball he had ever witnessed in his 20 years experience on the diamond." In the first game London led 5-3 until the ninth, thanks to a Deneau grand slam in the fourth inning and an insurance run in the seventh. Deneau was also pitching well, but after giving up two hits and a run in the ninth he called Heck in to relieve him with two men out and two on base. Tragically, Heck walked his first batter and gave up a double to the second, losing the game 6-5. The second game was even more unusual. It went 12 scoreless innings and then had to be called on account of darkness.

The following week London played its last two games at home before crowds of over 10,000. The team finished the season just one game behind Ottawa, with a .621 average. For the year, Deneau had pitched 105.1 innings in 17 games (won 5, lost 5), leading the league in strikeouts with 71. He also fielded in 94 games (fielding percentage: .754) and batted .291 in 296 at-bats (slugging: .399).

After the regular season Deneau took his London team to Windsor for an exhibition game against the home team on Sept. 6. On the 21st, he led an all-star selection from the Canadian League against the Packards, a Detroit amateur team.

== Brantford Red Sox, 1914-1915 ==
Despite his team's excellent finish in 1913, 1914 was a bad year for George Deneau. The London owners decided to hire a new manager and keep Rube only as a player, at a lower salary. Deneau would have none of it, and had himself traded to the Brantford Red Sox for Ernest "Chubby" Coose.

Brantford had finished last in 1913, and Coose's stats, though good enough, were not any better than Deneau's. In his two seasons at Brantford, Coose had pitched 51 games, winning 20 and losing 17. He was also a decent utility outfielder, batting .273 and slugging .231. Perhaps London was impressed by his .963 fielding percentage. At any rate, when Coose told his new owners that he wanted "a big league salary . . . or he will not report," they chose the latter option. According to his page at Baseball-Reference.Com, Coose never played in a league again.

As a player Rube was at first base with Brantford, batting 356 times in 94 games for a batting average of .272 (.365 slugging). But as a manager he could not do anything with the Red Sox, despite earnest efforts before the season to sign up a better class of player. Brantford ended up at the bottom of the league again in 1914, with a .404 average.

In a bitter moment in mid-season Deneau called Frank Reisling, his replacement as manager at London, a "has-been." But in reality it was Deneau, at age 35, who was winding down his career. At the end of the season he suffered an injury in a game against Ottawa. The following year, his last in pro ball, would see him at bat in only 13 games (.250 batting average, .281 slugging).

After predicting a successful season in April, Deneau was unable to keep the Red Sox out of the cellar. On June 10 the team asked for his resignation. Just two days after leaving Brantford Rube was in a new job as umpire in an Ottawa-London double-header. Reporting on the move the Windsor Evening Record called him "the man who did much to put baseball on the map in Western Ontario . . . one of the most prominent men in the game."

== Career in Public Safety ==
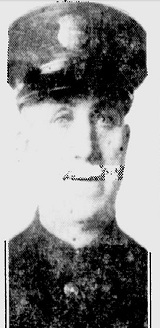
Deneau in his police uniform: This is the picture that accompanied the report of his death in the Border Cities Star, Jan. 11, 1926.

In 1917 Deneau signed on with the Ford City police force and served four years.

Then in 1921 the Town of Riverside was organized on the Detroit River just east of Ford City. Deneau went to Riverside as Assistant Chief of Police, under Chief Dennis Mahoney. In 1922 the town added a constable to the force and built a five-cell police station on Riverside Drive. Articles about Deneau's police work appeared regularly in the Border Cities Star through 1925. He kept track of lost property, chased speeders (including Ty Cobb), caught burglars and bootleggers, got into gun battles, rounded up suspicious characters, and with his colleagues managed to haul a dead horse out of Little River and return it to its owner for burial.

He appears to have been something of a stickler for rules, advising citizens in the local newspaper about strict enforcement of open fires laws and warning that women who cuddled up to the driver of an automobile could expect a ticket.

In 1922 Riverside also acquired a fire engine (a Ford, naturally), and soon Deneau was battling blazes as the town's default fireman. In 1924 new fire fighting equipment was purchased and the town named Deneau Fire Chief.

Deneau did this new work in addition to his police duties and his continuing commitment to local sports. While in Riverside he played in a bowling league and joined an old-timers baseball team. In 1919 during his stint with the Ford City police department he had coached Ford Motor's company team.

Deneau died on Jan. 10, 1926, after a short and sudden bout with pneumonia, at his home at 132 Lauzon Road in Riverside. The following day the Border Cities Star ran an extensive and laudatory article. "Not only was Mr. Deneau highly esteemed in police circles," it said, "but in the sporting world he had earned for himself wide renown." Deneau had been an active parishioner of St. Rose of Lima church in Riverside, a member of the Holy Name Society and the Catholic Order of Foresters. That evening Riverside's town council passed a resolution of condolence and stood for two minutes of silence to honor him. The mayor said, "It is a shock we all will feel, for George, or 'Rube' as we all knew him, was one of the most kind-hearted, most understanding, and still most efficient police officers we have ever had."

In February the police departments of the Border Cities, along with the provincial police, organized a dance and box social at St. Rose to benefit their fallen comrade's widow Irene and his four daughters.
