= Eugene Jones (baseball) =

American baseball player (1922–1960)

- Pitcher
- Born: March 9, 1922; Atlanta, Georgia, U.S.
- Died: July 30, 1960 (aged 38); Atlanta, Georgia, U.S.
- Batted: Left Threw: Left

Negro league baseball debut
- 1943, for the Homestead Grays

Last appearance
- 1943, for the Atlanta Black Crackers
- Stats at Baseball Reference

Teams
- Homestead Grays (1943); Atlanta Black Crackers (1943)

Cecil Eugene Jones (March 9, 1922 – July 30, 1960) was an American Negro league pitcher in the 1940s.

A native of Atlanta, Georgia, Jones pitched for the Homestead Grays during their 1943 Negro World Series championship season. He appeared in six games on the mound for the Grays in 1943, posting a 2–0 record with 16 strikeouts in 23.2 innings. Jones also played briefly for the Atlanta Black Crackers that season. He died in Atlanta in 1960 at age 38.
