= Oscar Owens =

American baseball player

- Pitcher / Outfielder
- Born: September 7, 1893; Reidsville, North Carolina, U.S.
- Died: April 30, 1960 (aged 66); Washington, D.C., U.S.
- Batted: Right Threw: Right

Negro league baseball debut
- 1921, for the Homestead Grays

Last appearance
- 1931, for the Homestead Grays

Teams
- Homestead Grays (1921–1922); Pittsburgh Keystones (1922); Homestead Grays (1924–1931)

William Oscar Owens (September 7, 1893 – April 30, 1960), nicknamed "Cannon Ball", was an American Negro league baseball pitcher and outfielder between 1921 and 1931.

A native of Reidsville, North Carolina, Owens made his Negro leagues debut with the Homestead Grays in 1921. He played 10 seasons with the Grays, and also played for the Pittsburgh Keystones in 1922. Owens died in Washington, D.C., in 1960 at age 66.
