= Abbie Johnson =

American baseball player (1871–1960)

- Second baseman / Shortstop
- Born: January 19, 1871; Portland, Ontario, Canada
- Died: November 24, 1960 (aged 89); Detroit, Michigan, U.S.
- Batted: Unknown Threw: Unknown

MLB debut
- September 1, 1896, for the Louisville Colonels

Last MLB appearance
- August 12, 1897, for the Louisville Colonels

MLB statistics
- Batting average: .238
- Home runs: 0
- Runs batted in: 37
- Stats at Baseball Reference

Teams
- Louisville Colonels (1896–1897)

Ebenezer Tremayne Johnson (January 19, 1871 – November 24, 1960) was a Canadian-born Major League Baseball second baseman and shortstop for the Louisville Colonels during the 1896 and 1897 seasons.
