= 1956 Pittsburgh Pirates season =

1956 Pittsburgh Pirates
- League: National League
- Ballpark: Forbes Field
- City: Pittsburgh, Pennsylvania
- Owners: John W. Galbreath (majority shareholder); Bing Crosby, Thomas P. Johnson, Branch Rickey (minority shareholders)
- General managers: Joe L. Brown
- Managers: Bobby Bragan
- Radio: KDKA; Bob Prince, Dick Bingham, Joe Tucker

The 1956 Pittsburgh Pirates season was the 75th season of the Pittsburgh Pirates franchise, the 70th in the National League. The Pirates finished seventh in the league standings with a record of 66–88.

== Regular season ==
=== Season standings ===
National League
Team	W	L	Pct.	GB	Home	Road
Brooklyn Dodgers	93	61	.604	—	52‍–‍25	41‍–‍36
Milwaukee Braves	92	62	.597	1	47‍–‍29	45‍–‍33
Cincinnati Redlegs	91	63	.591	2	51‍–‍26	40‍–‍37
St. Louis Cardinals	76	78	.494	17	43‍–‍34	33‍–‍44
Philadelphia Phillies	71	83	.461	22	40‍–‍37	31‍–‍46
New York Giants	67	87	.435	26	37‍–‍40	30‍–‍47
Pittsburgh Pirates	66	88	.429	27	35‍–‍43	31‍–‍45
Chicago Cubs	60	94	.390	33	39‍–‍38	21‍–‍56

=== Record vs. opponents ===
1956 National League record Sources:
Team	BRO	CHC	CIN	MIL	NYG	PHI	PIT	STL
Brooklyn	—	16–6	11–11	10–12	14–8	13–9	13–9	16–6
Chicago	6–16	—	6–16–1	9–13	7–15	13–9	10–12–1	9–13–1
Cincinnati	11–11	16–6–1	—	9–13	14–8	11–11	17–5	13–9
Milwaukee	12–10	13–9	13–9	—	17–5	10–12	14–8–1	13–9
New York	8–14	15–7	8–14	5–17	—	11–11	13–9	7–15
Philadelphia	9–13	9–13	11–11	12–10	11–11	—	7–15	12–10
Pittsburgh	9–13	12–10–1	5–17	8–14–1	9–13	15–7	—	8–14–1
St. Louis	6–16	13–9–1	9–13	9–13	15–7	10–12	14–8–1	—

=== Game log ===
1956 Game Log: 66–88 (Home: 35–43; Away: 31–45)
April: 5–6 (Home: 1–2; Away: 4–4)

#	Date	Opponent	Score	Win	Loss	Save	Attendance	Record
1	April 17	@ Giants	3–4	Antonelli	**Friend** (0–1)	—	12,790	0–1
2	April 18	@ Giants	4–5	McCall	**Law** (0–1)	—	2,493	0–2
3	April 19	@ Giants	3–2	**Kline** (1–0)	Worthington	—	1,922	1–2
4	April 20	Dodgers	0–5	Craig	**Hall** (0–1)	—	23,357	1–3
5	April 21	Dodgers	3–1	**Friend** (1–1)	Lehman	—	8,603	2–3
6	April 22	Dodgers	1–4 (6)	Newcombe	**Law** (0–2)	—	15,264	2–4
7	April 25	@ Phillies	6–5	**Law** (1–2)	Owens	**King** (1)	5,347	3–4
8	April 27	@ Dodgers	2–7	Craig	**Kline** (1–1)	—	7,056	3–5
9	April 28	@ Dodgers	2–5	Newcombe	**Hall** (0–2)	—	7,806	3–6
10	April 29	@ Dodgers	10–1	**Friend** (2–1)	Drysdale	—		4–6
11	April 29	@ Dodgers	11–3	**King** (1–0)	Loes	—	22,609	5–6

May: 16–10 (Home: 11–6; Away: 5–4)

#	Date	Opponent	Score	Win	Loss	Save	Attendance	Record
12	May 1	@ Cardinals	4–2	**Face** (1–0)	Mizell	**Law** (1)	6,331	6–6
13	May 2	@ Cardinals	9–10 (10)	Collum	**Munger** (0–1)	—	6,382	6–7
14	May 3	@ Redlegs	5–1	**Friend** (3–1)	Nuxhall	—	2,561	7–7
15	May 4	@ Redlegs	3–4	Fowler	**Hall** (0–3)	—	6,438	7–8
16	May 5	@ Redlegs	6–7 (10)	LaPalme	**King** (1–1)	—	4,481	7–9
17	May 6	@ Cubs	2–1	**Kline** (2–1)	Minner	—		8–9
18	May 6	@ Cubs	6–6 (7)			—	11,426	8–9
19	May 8	@ Braves	0–5	Spahn	**Friend** (3–2)	—	18,466	8–10
20	May 11	Phillies	6–5	**Arroyo** (1–0)	Meyer	—	17,605	9–10
21	May 12	Phillies	6–5	**Friend** (4–2)	Roberts	**King** (2)	20,115	10–10
22	May 13	Phillies	11–9	**Face** (2–0)	Meyer	**Law** (2)		11–10
23	May 13	Phillies	2–7	Rogovin	**Hall** (0–4)	Roberts	20,435	11–11
24	May 16	Redlegs	9–2	**Friend** (5–2)	Nuxhall	—	3,053	12–11
25	May 17	Cubs	1–4	Meyer	**Kline** (2–2)	Lown	6,627	12–12
26	May 18	Cubs	2–3	Lown	**Face** (2–1)	—	10,382	12–13
27	May 19	Cubs	7–4	**King** (2–1)	Jones	**Face** (1)	6,863	13–13
28	May 20	Braves	6–3	**Friend** (6–2)	Crone	—		14–13
29	May 20	Braves	5–0	**Kline** (3–2)	Spahn	—	32,346	15–13
30	May 22	Cardinals	3–6	Wehmeier	**Law** (1–3)	Collum	19,316	15–14
31	May 23	Cardinals	6–0	**Friend** (7–2)	Schmidt	—	19,917	16–14
32	May 25	@ Phillies	8–5	**King** (3–1)	Simmons	**Munger** (1)	10,407	17–14
33	May 26	@ Phillies	6–2	**Law** (2–3)	Miller	—	4,614	18–14
34	May 28	Dodgers	3–2	**Friend** (8–2)	Erskine	—	32,221	19–14
35	May 29	Dodgers	1–10	Newcombe	**Kline** (3–3)	—	11,935	19–15
36	May 30	Giants	5–4 (10)	**Face** (3–1)	McCall	—		20–15
37	May 30	Giants	3–5 (15)	Antonelli	**Law** (2–4)	—	27,680	20–16
38	May 31	Giants	3–0 (8)	**Kline** (4–3)	Hearn	—	15,123	21–16

June: 11–17 (Home: 4–12; Away: 7–5)

#	Date	Opponent	Score	Win	Loss	Save	Attendance	Record
39	June 1	@ Braves	4–1	**Friend** (9–2)	Spahn	**King** (3)	24,528	22–16
40	June 2	@ Braves	4–2	**Munger** (1–1)	Conley	**Kline** (1)	27,650	23–16
41	June 3	@ Braves	3–1	**Face** (4–1)	Crone	**King** (4)		24–16
42	June 3	@ Braves	3–4	Buhl	**Law** (2–5)	—	34,915	24–17
43	June 5	@ Cubs	3–7	Hacker	**Friend** (9–3)	—	7,847	24–18
44	June 6	@ Cubs	8–2	**Kline** (5–3)	Minner	—	7,545	25–18
45	June 7	@ Cubs	2–5	Rush	**Face** (4–2)	—	4,535	25–19
46	June 8	@ Cardinals	2–0 (11)	**Friend** (10–3)	Dickson	—	20,079	26–19
47	June 9	@ Cardinals	3–8	Mizell	**Law** (2–6)	Konstanty	12,149	26–20
48	June 10	@ Cardinals	11–3	**Arroyo** (2–0)	Schmidt	—		27–20
49	June 10	@ Cardinals	0–3	Wehmeier	**Kline** (5–4)	—	28,129	27–21
50	June 12	@ Redlegs	4–3	**Face** (5–2)	Nuxhall	**King** (5)	15,919	28–21
51	June 15	Cardinals	12–1	**Kline** (6–4)	Mizell	—	26,276	29–21
52	June 16	Cardinals	2–0 (7)	**Friend** (11–3)	Wehmeier	—	14,550	30–21
53	June 17	Cardinals	1–3	Poholsky	**Law** (2–7)	—		30–22
54	June 17	Cardinals	3–8	Schmidt	**Arroyo** (2–1)	Konstanty	30,127	30–23
55	June 18	Braves	2–3	Spahn	**Kline** (6–5)	—	16,735	30–24
56	June 19	Braves	3–5	Burdette	**Friend** (11–4)	Sleater	23,743	30–25
57	June 20	Braves	3–7	Conley	**Law** (2–8)	—	19,775	30–26
58	June 21	Braves	2–7	Buhl	**Kline** (6–6)	—	8,292	30–27
59	June 23	Cubs	5–9 (10)	Davis	**Face** (5–3)	—	7,809	30–28
60	June 24	Cubs	3–5	Valentinetti	**Face** (5–4)	—		30–29
61	June 24	Cubs	1–0 (6)	**Pepper** (1–0)	Jones	**Arroyo** (1)	17,066	31–29
62	June 25	Redlegs	1–2	Fowler	**Kline** (6–7)	—	17,007	31–30
63	June 27	Redlegs	2–10	Lawrence	**Friend** (11–5)	Freeman	24,353	31–31
64	June 28	Redlegs	3–4	Acker	**Arroyo** (2–2)	Fowler	9,915	31–32
65	June 29	Giants	6–3	**Law** (3–8)	Hearn	**Face** (2)	18,797	32–32
66	June 30	Giants	4–6	Gomez	**Kline** (6–8)	Wilhelm	8,111	32–33

July: 11–20 (Home: 5–9; Away: 6–11)

#	Date	Opponent	Score	Win	Loss	Save	Attendance	Record
67	July 1	Giants	2–3	Antonelli	**Friend** (11–6)	Grissom		32–34
68	July 1	Giants	6–7	McCall	**Arroyo** (2–3)	Grissom	23,459	32–35
69	July 3	Phillies	6–5	**O'Brien** (1–0)	Meyer	—	5,804	33–35
70	July 4	Phillies	2–4	Haddix	**Kline** (6–9)	—		33–36
71	July 4	Phillies	8–4	**Face** (6–4)	Miller	—	16,076	34–36
72	July 7	@ Giants	2–3	Antonelli	**Friend** (11–7)	Wilhelm	7,151	34–37
73	July 8	@ Giants	1–11	Gomez	**Law** (3–9)	—		34–38
74	July 8	@ Giants	5–2	**Kline** (7–9)	Worthington	**Face** (3)	15,406	35–38
75	July 12	@ Cubs	2–1	**Kline** (8–9)	Kaiser	—		36–38
76	July 12	@ Cubs	5–4	**Face** (7–4)	Jones	—	10,077	37–38
77	July 13	@ Cubs	6–7	Lown	**Friend** (11–8)	—	6,958	37–39
78	July 14	@ Cubs	2–6	Rush	**Law** (3–10)	—		37–40
79	July 14	@ Cubs	5–6 (10)	Lown	**Face** (7–5)	—	17,195	37–41
80	July 15	@ Braves	2–3	Spahn	**Law** (3–11)	—		37–42
81	July 15	@ Braves	1–4	Phillips	**Naranjo** (0–1)	—	35,631	37–43
82	July 16	@ Braves	1–2	Buhl	**Kline** (8–10)	—	20,124	37–44
83	July 17	@ Cardinals	4–2 (10)	**Friend** (12–8)	Wehmeier	**Face** (4)	12,182	38–44
84	July 18	@ Cardinals	1–1			—	15,195	38–44
85	July 20	@ Redlegs	4–6 (12)	Klippstein	**Waters** (0–1)	—	19,342	38–45
86	July 21	@ Redlegs	4–3	**Face** (8–5)	Lawrence	—	8,859	39–45
87	July 22	@ Redlegs	8–6	**Munger** (2–1)	Freeman	—		40–45
88	July 22	@ Redlegs	2–9	Nuxhall	**Pollet** (0–1)	Acker	28,505	40–46
89	July 23	@ Redlegs	3–4	Lawrence	**Face** (8–6)	Freeman	11,318	40–47
90	July 24	Cubs	6–2	**Kline** (9–10)	Rush	—	12,861	41–47
91	July 25	Cubs	9–8	**King** (4–1)	Brosnan	—	12,861	42–47
92	July 26	Cubs	4–0	**Waters** (1–1)	Jones	**Pollet** (1)	7,121	43–47
93	July 27	Redlegs	2–3	Fowler	**Face** (8–7)	—	31,494	43–48
94	July 28	Redlegs	3–8	Klippstein	**Pollet** (0–2)	—	10,166	43–49
95	July 29	Redlegs	1–6	Lawrence	**Friend** (12–9)	—		43–50
96	July 29	Redlegs	2–3	Freeman	**Law** (3–12)	—	30,429	43–51
97	July 30	Redlegs	2–4	Freeman	**Pepper** (1–1)	—	11,256	43–52
98	July 31	Cardinals	0–7	Dickson	**Munger** (2–2)	—	10,965	43–53

August: 12–20 (Home: 6–7; Away: 6–13)

#	Date	Opponent	Score	Win	Loss	Save	Attendance	Record
99	August 1	Cardinals	1–4	Schmidt	**Kline** (9–11)	—	8,592	43–54
100	August 2	Cardinals	5–7	Wehmeier	**Friend** (12–10)	Jackson	5,745	43–55
101	August 3	Braves	4–3	**Law** (4–12)	Spahn	—	17,479	44–55
102	August 4	Braves	3–7	Trowbridge	**Pollet** (0–3)	—	7,494	44–56
103	August 5	Braves	1–5	Conley	**Kline** (9–12)	Johnson		44–57
104	August 5	Braves	0–5 (5)	Burdette	**Friend** (12–11)	—	18,004	44–58
105	August 7	@ Dodgers	0–3	Newcombe	**Law** (4–13)	—	17,504	44–59
106	August 8	Dodgers	8–5	**Munger** (3–2)	Craig	**Kline** (2)	18,612	45–59
107	August 9	Dodgers	3–7	Roebuck	**Hall** (0–5)	—	7,486	45–60
108	August 10	Giants	3–2	**Friend** (13–11)	Littlefield	—	8,234	46–60
109	August 11	Giants	2–4	Antonelli	**Kline** (9–13)	Hearn	5,655	46–61
110	August 12	Giants	3–2	**Law** (5–13)	Gomez	—		47–61
111	August 12	Giants	11–3	**Waters** (2–1)	McCall	—	9,552	48–61
112	August 14	@ Phillies	0–3	Haddix	**Friend** (13–12)	—		48–62
113	August 14	@ Phillies	2–11	Simmons	**Munger** (3–3)	—	32,873	48–63
114	August 15	@ Phillies	5–1	**Kline** (10–13)	Meyer	—	12,337	49–63
115	August 16	@ Phillies	4–1	**Law** (6–13)	Roberts	—	7,070	50–63
116	August 17	@ Giants	3–5	Margoneri	**Munger** (3–4)	McCall	5,998	50–64
117	August 18	@ Giants	9–1	**Friend** (14–12)	Gomez	—	4,955	51–64
118	August 19	@ Giants	6–7	Wilhelm	**Hall** (0–6)	—		51–65
119	August 19	@ Giants	2–3	Antonelli	**Kline** (10–14)	McCall	8,587	51–66
120	August 21	@ Redlegs	4–7	Freeman	**Pollet** (0–4)	—	8,267	51–67
121	August 22	@ Redlegs	3–6	Nuxhall	**Friend** (14–13)	Jeffcoat	8,076	51–68
122	August 23	@ Cardinals	0–3	Mizell	**Kline** (10–15)	—		51–69
123	August 23	@ Cardinals	2–3	Collum	**Face** (8–8)	—	11,935	51–70
124	August 24	@ Cardinals	2–6	Dickson	**Waters** (2–2)	—	9,317	51–71
125	August 25	@ Cardinals	5–8	Blaylock	**Law** (6–14)	Jackson	8,976	51–72
126	August 26	@ Cubs	2–0	**Friend** (15–13)	Rush	—	10,631	52–72
127	August 26	@ Cubs	2–1	**Kline** (11–15)	Jones	**Friend** (1)	10,631	53–72
128	August 28	@ Braves	5–4	**Face** (9–8)	Trowbridge	—	25,778	54–72
129	August 29	@ Braves	1–4	Burdette	**Face** (9–9)	—	24,861	54–73
130	August 30	@ Braves	1–1 (9)			—	17,783	54–73
131	August 31	Phillies	6–3	**Kline** (12–15)	Hamner	**Pollet** (2)	11,147	55–73

September: 11–15 (Home: 8–7; Away: 3–8)

#	Date	Opponent	Score	Win	Loss	Save	Attendance	Record
132	September 1	Phillies	2–3	Rogovin	**Hall** (0–7)	—	5,071	55–74
133	September 2	Phillies	10–6	**Law** (7–14)	Simmons	—		56–74
134	September 2	Phillies	5–1	**Naranjo** (1–1)	Roberts	—	12,470	57–74
135	September 3	@ Dodgers	3–4	Bessent	**Friend** (15–14)	—		57–75
136	September 3	@ Dodgers	3–2	**Face** (10–9)	Drysdale	**Friend** (2)	29,045	58–75
137	September 5	@ Dodgers	3–4	Maglie	**Kline** (12–16)	Bessent	10,332	58–76
138	September 7	@ Phillies	2–5	Roberts	**Friend** (15–15)	—	7,835	58–77
139	September 8	@ Phillies	5–4	**Face** (11–9)	Flowers	**Hall** (1)	4,806	59–77
140	September 9	@ Phillies	4–1 (10)	**Kline** (13–16)	Miller	**Face** (5)		60–77
141	September 9	@ Phillies	5–6 (10)	Roberts	**Naranjo** (1–2)	—	11,104	60–78
142	September 11	Cubs	4–3	**Face** (12–9)	Lown	—	3,987	61–78
143	September 12	Cubs	0–3	Jones	**Law** (7–15)	—	3,689	61–79
144	September 13	Redlegs	4–5	Nuxhall	**Face** (12–10)	Freeman	8,765	61–80
145	September 15	Redlegs	4–6	Lawrence	**Friend** (15–16)	Freeman	2,654	61–81
146	September 16	Cardinals	2–3 (10)	Dickson	**Face** (12–11)	—		61–82
147	September 16	Cardinals	9–3	**Law** (8–15)	Wehmeier	—	8,742	62–82
148	September 18	Braves	4–6	Sleater	**Face** (12–12)	Spahn	9,786	62–83
149	September 20	Braves	2–1 (10)	**Friend** (16–16)	Crone	—	1,691	63–83
150	September 21	Dodgers	2–1	**Kline** (14–16)	Maglie	—	10,872	64–83
151	September 22	Dodgers	5–1	**Arroyo** (3–3)	Erskine	**Friend** (3)	6,452	65–83
152	September 23	Dodgers	3–8	Newcombe	**Face** (12–13)	Labine	44,932	65–84
153	September 24	Dodgers	6–5	**Friend** (17–16)	Craig	—	17,252	66–84
154	September 25	@ Giants	0–10	Antonelli	**Kline** (14–17)	Surkont	1,275	66–85
155	September 29	@ Dodgers	2–6	Maglie	**Friend** (17–17)	—	26,340	66–86
156	September 29	@ Dodgers	1–3	Labine	**Kline** (14–18)	—	26,340	66–87
157	September 30	@ Dodgers	6–8	Newcombe	**Law** (8–16)	Bessent	31,983	66–88

Legend: = Win = Loss = Tie
Bold = Pirates team member

=== Notable transactions ===
- May 17, 1956: Dick Littlefield and Bobby Del Greco were traded by the Pirates to the St. Louis Cardinals for Bill Virdon.
- May 28, 1956: Toby Atwell was traded by the Pirates to the St. Louis Cardinals for cash and a player to be named later. The Cardinals completed the deal by sending Dick Rand to the Pirates on October 14.

=== Roster ===
1956 Pittsburgh Pirates
**Roster**
**Pitchers**: 36 Luis Arroyo; 45 Lino Donoso; 26 Roy Face; 19 Bob Friend; 25,37 Bob Garber; 30 Dick Hall; 29 Nellie King; 22 Ron Kline; 32 Vern Law; 27 Dick Littlefield; 25 Jack McMahan; 20 Red Munger; 27 Cholly Naranjo; 23 Laurin Pepper; 11 Howie Pollet; 34 Bob Purkey; 35 Max Surkont; 17 Red Swanson; 35,36 Fred Waters	**Catchers**: 11 Toby Atwell; 38 Hank Foiles; 31 Bill Hall; 17 Danny Kravitz; 10 Jack Shepard; **Infielders**: 12 Dick Cole; 8 Gene Freese; 24 Dick Groat; 9 Spook Jacobs; 3 Dale Long; 9 Bill Mazeroski; 7 Eddie O'Brien; 6 Johnny O'Brien; 9 Curt Roberts; 15 Frank Thomas; 5 Preston Ward	**Outfielders**: 21 Roberto Clemente; 18 Bobby Del Greco; 14 Jerry Lynch; 14 Johnny Powers; 4 Bob Skinner; 18 Bill Virdon; 16 Lee Walls	**Manager**: 2 Bobby Bragan; **Coaches**: 40 Danny Murtaugh; 43 Sam Narron; 41 Clyde Sukeforth

== Player stats ==
=== Batting ===
==== Starters by position ====
Note: Pos = Position; G = Games played; AB = At bats; H = Hits; Avg. = Batting average; HR = Home runs; RBI = Runs batted in

Pos	Player	G	AB	H	Avg.	HR	RBI
C	Jack Shepard	100	256	62	.242	7	30
1B	Dale Long	148	517	136	.263	27	91
2B	Bill Mazeroski	81	255	62	.243	3	14
SS	Dick Groat	142	520	142	.273	0	37
3B	Frank Thomas	157	588	166	.282	25	80
LF	Lee Walls	143	474	130	.274	11	54
CF	Bill Virdon	133	509	170	.334	8	37
RF	Roberto Clemente	147	543	169	.311	7	60

==== Other batters ====
Note: G = Games played; AB = At bats; H = Hits; Avg. = Batting average; HR = Home runs; RBI = Runs batted in

Player	G	AB	H	Avg.	HR	RBI
Bob Skinner	113	233	47	.202	5	29
Hank Foiles	79	222	47	.212	7	25
Gene Freese	65	207	43	.208	3	14
Johnny O'Brien	73	104	18	.173	0	3
Dick Cole	72	99	21	.212	0	9
Danny Kravitz	32	68	18	.265	2	10
Curt Roberts	31	62	11	.177	0	4
Eddie O'Brien	63	53	14	.264	0	3
Spook Jacobs	11	37	6	.162	0	1
Preston Ward	16	30	10	.333	1	11
John Powers	11	21	1	.048	0	0
Bobby Del Greco	14	20	4	.200	2	3
Jerry Lynch	19	19	3	.158	0	0
Toby Atwell	12	18	2	.111	0	3
Bill Hall	1	3	0	.000	0	0

=== Pitching ===
==== Starting pitchers ====
Note: G = Games pitched; IP = Innings pitched; W = Wins; L = Losses; ERA = Earned run average; SO = Strikeouts

Player	G	IP	W	L	ERA	SO
Bob Friend	49	314.1	17	17	3.46	166
Ron Kline	44	264.0	14	18	3.38	125
Vern Law	39	195.2	8	16	4.32	60

==== Other pitchers ====
Note: G = Games pitched; IP = Innings pitched; W = Wins; L = Losses; ERA = Earned run average; SO = Strikeouts

Player	G	IP	W	L	ERA	SO
Red Munger	35	107.0	3	4	4.04	45
Dick Hall	19	62.1	0	7	4.76	27
Fred Waters	23	51.0	2	2	2.82	14
Laurin Pepper	11	30.0	1	1	3.00	12
Dick Littlefield	6	12.2	0	0	4.26	10

==== Relief pitchers ====
Note: G = Games pitched; W = Wins; L = Losses; SV = Saves; ERA = Earned run average; SO = Strikeouts

Player	G	W	L	SV	ERA	SO
Roy Face	68	12	13	6	3.52	96
Nellie King	38	4	1	5	3.15	25
Howie Pollet	19	0	4	2	3.09	10
Luis Arroyo	18	3	3	0	4.71	17
Cholly Naranjo	17	1	2	0	4.46	26
Jack McMahan	11	0	0	0	6.08	9
Red Swanson	9	0	0	0	10.03	5
Johnny O'Brien	8	1	0	0	2.84	9
Lino Donoso	3	0	0	0	0.00	1
Bob Purkey	2	0	0	0	2.25	1
Bob Garber	2	0	0	0	2.25	3
Eddie O'Brien	1	0	0	0	0.00	0
Max Surkont	1	0	0	0	4.50	1

== Farm system ==
Level	Team	League	Manager
Open	Hollywood Stars	Pacific Coast League	Clay Hopper
AA	New Orleans Pelicans	Southern Association	Andy Cohen
A	Williamsport Grays	Eastern League	John Fitzpatrick
A	Lincoln Chiefs	Western League	Larry Shepard
B	Waco Pirates	Big State League	Monty Basgall
B	Kinston Eagles	Carolina League	Jack Paepke and Tex Taylor
C	Douglas Copper Kings	Arizona–Mexico League	Jerry Gardner
C	Grand Forks Chiefs	Northern League	Al Kubski
C	Billings Mustangs	Pioneer League	Buck Elliott
D	Dublin Irish	Georgia State League	Robert Clark, Wilbur Caldwell and Wayne Wallace
D	Brunswick Pirates	Georgia–Florida League	Frank Oceak
D	Clinton Pirates	Midwest League	Stan Wentzel

LEAGUE CHAMPIONS: Lincoln
