= 1956 Philadelphia Phillies season =

1956 Philadelphia Phillies
- League: National League
- Ballpark: Connie Mack Stadium
- City: Philadelphia
- Owners: R. R. M. Carpenter Jr.
- General managers: Roy Hamey
- Managers: Mayo Smith
- Television: WRCV; WFIL
- Radio: WIP (By Saam, Gene Kelly, Claude Haring)

The 1956 Philadelphia Phillies season was the 74th season in the history of the franchise, and the 19th season for the Philadelphia Phillies at Connie Mack Stadium.

== Offseason ==
- October 3, 1955: Peanuts Lowrey was released by the Phillies.
- November 7, 1955: Wally Westlake was signed as a free agent by the Phillies.
- December 9, 1955: Frank Baumholtz was purchased by the Phillies from the Chicago Cubs.

== Regular season ==
=== Season standings ===
National League
Team	W	L	Pct.	GB	Home	Road
Brooklyn Dodgers	93	61	.604	—	52‍–‍25	41‍–‍36
Milwaukee Braves	92	62	.597	1	47‍–‍29	45‍–‍33
Cincinnati Redlegs	91	63	.591	2	51‍–‍26	40‍–‍37
St. Louis Cardinals	76	78	.494	17	43‍–‍34	33‍–‍44
Philadelphia Phillies	71	83	.461	22	40‍–‍37	31‍–‍46
New York Giants	67	87	.435	26	37‍–‍40	30‍–‍47
Pittsburgh Pirates	66	88	.429	27	35‍–‍43	31‍–‍45
Chicago Cubs	60	94	.390	33	39‍–‍38	21‍–‍56

=== Record vs. opponents ===
1956 National League record Sources:
Team	BRO	CHC	CIN	MIL	NYG	PHI	PIT	STL
Brooklyn	—	16–6	11–11	10–12	14–8	13–9	13–9	16–6
Chicago	6–16	—	6–16–1	9–13	7–15	13–9	10–12–1	9–13–1
Cincinnati	11–11	16–6–1	—	9–13	14–8	11–11	17–5	13–9
Milwaukee	12–10	13–9	13–9	—	17–5	10–12	14–8–1	13–9
New York	8–14	15–7	8–14	5–17	—	11–11	13–9	7–15
Philadelphia	9–13	9–13	11–11	12–10	11–11	—	7–15	12–10
Pittsburgh	9–13	12–10–1	5–17	8–14–1	9–13	15–7	—	8–14–1
St. Louis	6–16	13–9–1	9–13	9–13	15–7	10–12	14–8–1	—

=== Notable transactions ===
- May 14, 1956: Bobby Morgan was traded by the Phillies to the St. Louis Cardinals for Solly Hemus.
- May 18, 1956: Wally Westlake was released by the Phillies.
- June 29, 1956: Art Mahaffey was signed as an amateur free agent by the Phillies.
- July 19, 1956: Bob Lipski was signed as an amateur free agent by the Phillies.

=== Game log ===
Legend
	Phillies win
	Phillies loss
	Postponement
**Bold**	Phillies team member

1956 Game Log
Overall Record: 71–83
April (5–6)

#	Date	Opponent	Score	Win	Loss	Save	Attendance	Record
1	April 17	@ Dodgers	8–6	**Robin Roberts** (1–0)	Don Newcombe (0–1)	None	24,236	1–0
2	April 19	@ Dodgers	4–5 (10)	Clem Labine (1–0)	**Murry Dickson** (0–1)	None	12,214	1–1
3	April 20	Giants	2–1 (10)	**Jack Meyer** (1–0)	Hoyt Wilhelm (0–1)	None	25,194	2–1
4	April 22 (1)	Giants	3–1	**Robin Roberts** (2–0)	Johnny Antonelli (1–1)	None	see 2nd game	3–1
5	April 22 (2)	Giants	7–9	Rubén Gómez (1–0)	**Curt Simmons** (0–1)	Marv Grissom (1)	24,771	3–2
6	April 23	Dodgers	1–6	Don Drysdale (1–0)	**Murry Dickson** (0–2)	None	12,690	3–3
–	April 24	Dodgers	Postponed (cold); Makeup: July 8 as a traditional double-header					
7	April 25	Pirates	5–6	Vern Law (1–2)	**Jim Owens** (0–1)	Nellie King (1)	5,347	3–4
8	April 27	@ Giants	3–5	Al Worthington (1–1)	**Herm Wehmeier** (0–1)	None	6,465	3–5
9	April 28	@ Giants	6–2	**Robin Roberts** (3–0)	Johnny Antonelli (1–2)	None	8,297	4–5
10	April 29 (1)	@ Giants	5–4 (10)	**Jack Meyer** (2–0)	Hoyt Wilhelm (0–2)	None	see 2nd game	5–5
11	April 29 (2)	@ Giants	1–8	Ramón Monzant (1–0)	**Curt Simmons** (0–2)	None	18,689	5–6

May (8–16)

#	Date	Opponent	Score	Win	Loss	Save	Attendance	Record
12	May 1	@ Braves	4–6	Dave Jolly (1–0)	**Murry Dickson** (0–3)	None	13,950	5–7
13	May 4	@ Cubs	1–2	Bob Rush (1–1)	**Robin Roberts** (3–1)	None	2,647	5–8
–	May 5	@ Cubs	Postponed (rain); Makeup: July 18 as a traditional double-header					
14	May 6 (1)	@ Redlegs	2–10	Brooks Lawrence (3–0)	**Jim Owens** (0–2)	None	see 2nd game	5–9
15	May 6 (2)	@ Redlegs	9–11	Hersh Freeman (2–0)	**Saul Rogovin** (0–1)	None	23,639	5–10
16	May 8	@ Cardinals	1–9	Willard Schmidt (2–0)	**Robin Roberts** (3–2)	Larry Jackson (1)	7,379	5–11
17	May 9	@ Cardinals	0–3	Tom Poholsky (3–0)	**Herm Wehmeier** (0–2)	None	8,704	5–12
18	May 11	@ Pirates	5–6	Luis Arroyo (1–0)	**Jack Meyer** (2–1)	None	17,605	5–13
19	May 12	@ Pirates	5–6	Bob Friend (4–2)	**Robin Roberts** (3–3)	Nellie King (2)	20,115	5–14
20	May 13 (1)	@ Pirates	9–11	Roy Face (2–0)	**Jack Meyer** (2–2)	Vern Law (2)	see 2nd game	5–15
21	May 13 (2)	@ Pirates	7–2^{^{[a]}}	**Saul Rogovin** (1–1)	Dick Hall (0–4)	**Robin Roberts** (1)	20,435	6–15
22	May 15	Braves	3–1	**Stu Miller** (1–1)	Lew Burdette (1–2)	None	13,141	7–15
23	May 16	Braves	2–1	**Robin Roberts** (4–3)	Bob Buhl (2–2)	None	11,510	8–15
24	May 17	Cardinals	4–5	Ellis Kinder (1–0)	**Harvey Haddix** (1–1)	Jackie Collum (2)	8,249	8–16
25	May 18	Cardinals	4–2	**Curt Simmons** (1–2)	Willard Schmidt (2–1)	None	16,026	9–16
26	May 19	Cardinals	5–11	Lindy McDaniel (3–0)	**Saul Rogovin** (1–2)	None	7,605	9–17
27	May 20 (1)	Redlegs	1–5	Art Fowler (3–4)	**Robin Roberts** (4–4)	None	see 2nd game	9–18
28	May 20 (2)	Redlegs	6–4	**Bob Miller** (1–0)	Paul LaPalme (1–1)	**Harvey Haddix** (1)	21,677	10–18
–	May 22	Cubs	Postponed (rain); Makeup: June 15 as a traditional double-header					
29	May 23	Cubs	4–5	Vito Valentinetti (1–1)	**Harvey Haddix** (1–2)	None	5,795	10–19
30	May 24	Dodgers	6–4	**Robin Roberts** (5–4)	Don Drysdale (1–2)	None	16,432	11–19
31	May 25	Pirates	5–8	Nellie King (3–1)	**Curt Simmons** (1–3)	Red Munger (1)	10,407	11–20
32	May 26	Pirates	2–6	Vern Law (2–3)	**Stu Miller** (1–2)	None	4,614	11–21
–	May 27 (1)	Pirates	Postponed (rain); Makeup: August 14 as a traditional double-header					
–	May 27 (2)	Pirates	Postponed (rain); Makeup: August 16					
33	May 28	Giants	5–2	**Harvey Haddix** (2–2)	Al Worthington (1–5)	**Robin Roberts** (2)	10,430	12–21
34	May 30 (1)	Dodgers	5–6	Ed Roebuck (1–1)	**Robin Roberts** (5–5)	Clem Labine (4)	see 2nd game	12–22
35	May 30 (2)	Dodgers	12–3	**Saul Rogovin** (2–2)	Don Drysdale (1–3)	None	35,942	13–22

June (15–16)

#	Date	Opponent	Score	Win	Loss	Save	Attendance	Record
36	June 1	@ Cardinals	5–2	**Curt Simmons** (2–3)	Tom Poholsky (3–3)	**Bob Miller** (1)	8,868	14–22
37	June 2	@ Cardinals	6–4	**Stu Miller** (2–2)	Herm Wehmeier (1–5)	**Bob Miller** (2)	7,806	15–22
38	June 3 (1)	@ Cardinals	1–2	Murry Dickson (3–4)	**Robin Roberts** (5–6)	None	see 2nd game	15–23
39	June 3 (2)	@ Cardinals	9–3	**Harvey Haddix** (3–2)	Lindy McDaniel (4–1)	None	18,367	16–23
40	June 4	@ Redlegs	2–8	Art Fowler (4–6)	**Saul Rogovin** (2–3)	None	6,883	16–24
41	June 5	@ Redlegs	4–9	Joe Nuxhall (2–5)	**Curt Simmons** (2–4)	None	9,639	16–25
42	June 6	@ Redlegs	3–7	Brooks Lawrence (7–0)	**Stu Miller** (2–3)	Hersh Freeman (4)	8,896	16–26
43	June 7	@ Redlegs	5–8	Joe Nuxhall (3–5)	**Bob Miller** (1–1)	Hersh Freeman (5)	4,657	16–27
44	June 8	@ Cubs	4–5	Vito Valentinetti (2–1)	**Robin Roberts** (5–7)	None	5,065	16–28
45	June 9	@ Cubs	6–4	**Saul Rogovin** (3–3)	Russ Meyer (1–4)	**Bob Miller** (3)	11,910	17–28
46	June 10 (1)	@ Cubs	1–2 (11)	Vito Valentinetti (3–1)	**Curt Simmons** (2–5)	None	see 2nd game	17–29
47	June 10 (2)	@ Cubs	2–5	Sam Jones (3–4)	**Jim Owens** (0–3)	Turk Lown (3)	21,989	17–30
48	June 11	@ Braves	6–2	**Stu Miller** (3–3)	Gene Conley (1–3)	None	19,488	18–30
49	June 12	@ Braves	5–2	**Harvey Haddix** (4–2)	Bob Buhl (5–3)	None	27,483	19–30
50	June 13	@ Braves	6–8	Ray Crone (5–3)	**Robin Roberts** (5–8)	Gene Conley (1)	22,051	19–31
51	June 15 (1)	Cubs	6–5 (10)	**Jack Meyer** (3–2)	Turk Lown (1–3)	None	see 2nd game	20–31
52	June 15 (2)	Cubs	5–8	Vito Valentinetti (4–1)	**Bob Miller** (1–2)	Jim Davis (1)	18,272	20–32
–	June 16	Cubs	Postponed (rain, wet grounds); Makeup: July 30 as a traditional double-header					
53	June 17 (1)	Cubs	7–1	**Robin Roberts** (6–8)	Warren Hacker (1–6)	None	see 2nd game	21–32
54	June 17 (2)	Cubs	4–7	Sam Jones (4–4)	**Jim Owens** (0–4)	None	11,424	21–33
55	June 18	Redlegs	4–7 (10)	Brooks Lawrence (8–0)	**Harvey Haddix** (4–3)	None	10,820	21–34
56	June 19	Redlegs	4–2	**Jack Meyer** (4–2)	Johnny Klippstein (6–4)	None	13,549	22–34
57	June 20	Redlegs	3–2	**Curt Simmons** (3–5)	Art Fowler (4–7)	None	12,272	23–34
58	June 22	Cardinals	2–1	**Robin Roberts** (7–8)	Tom Poholsky (4–5)	None	20,258	24–34
59	June 23	Cardinals	8–3	**Harvey Haddix** (5–3)	Don Liddle (1–3)	None	6,307	25–34
60	June 24 (1)	Cardinals	4–8	Herm Wehmeier (3–6)	**Curt Simmons** (3–6)	None	see 2nd game	25–35
61	June 24 (2)	Cardinals	3–2	**Jack Meyer** (5–2)	Willard Schmidt (4–4)	None	19,246	26–35
62	June 25	Braves	5–8	Bob Buhl (8–3)	**Stu Miller** (3–4)	Warren Spahn (1)	14,467	26–36
63	June 26	Braves	4–2	**Robin Roberts** (8–8)	Ray Crone (7–4)	None	23,975	27–36
64	June 27	Braves	4–3 (11)	**Ron Negray** (1–0)	Ernie Johnson (1–2)	None	15,521	28–36
65	June 29	@ Dodgers	5–6	Clem Labine (7–2)	**Jack Meyer** (5–3)	None	12,229	28–37
66	June 30	@ Dodgers	7–10	Carl Erskine (5–6)	**Robin Roberts** (8–9)	Clem Labine (10)	8,525	28–38

July (17–14)

#	Date	Opponent	Score	Win	Loss	Save	Attendance	Record
67	July 1 (1)	@ Dodgers	7–4	**Stu Miller** (4–4)	Clem Labine (7–3)	**Jack Meyer** (1)	see 2nd game	29–38
68	July 1 (2)	@ Dodgers	1–4	Roger Craig (8–2)	**Saul Rogovin** (3–4)	None	18,299	29–39
69	July 3	@ Pirates	5–6	Johnny O'Brien (1–0)	**Jack Meyer** (5–4)	None	5,804	29–40
70	July 4 (1)	@ Pirates	4–2	**Harvey Haddix** (6–3)	Ron Kline (6–9)	None	see 2nd game	30–40
71	July 4 (2)	@ Pirates	4–8	Roy Face (6–4)	**Stu Miller** (4–5)	None	16,076	30–41
72	July 6	Dodgers	1–2	Carl Erskine (6–6)	**Robin Roberts** (8–10)	None	19,372	30–42
73	July 7	Dodgers	6–3	**Saul Rogovin** (4–4)	Roger Craig (8–3)	**Bob Miller** (4)	26,575	31–42
74	July 8 (1)	Dodgers	2–9	Don Newcombe (11–5)	**Stu Miller** (4–6)	None	see 2nd game	31–43
75	July 8 (2)	Dodgers	3–2	**Jack Meyer** (6–4)	Sal Maglie (2–2)	None	26,417	32–43
–	July 10	**1956 Major League Baseball All-Star Game at Griffith Stadium in Washington**						
76	July 12	@ Redlegs	7–4	**Harvey Haddix** (7–3)	Art Fowler (5–9)	**Ron Negray** (1)	12,331	33–43
77	July 13	@ Redlegs	6–4	**Curt Simmons** (4–6)	Tom Acker (1–1)	None	16,205	34–43
78	July 14	@ Redlegs	2–0	**Robin Roberts** (9–10)	Johnny Klippstein (7–5)	None	9,702	35–43
79	July 15 (1)	@ Cardinals	1–9	Murry Dickson (7–7)	**Stu Miller** (4–7)	Larry Jackson (3)	see 2nd game	35–44
80	July 15 (2)	@ Cardinals	7–5	**Saul Rogovin** (5–4)	Lindy McDaniel (4–3)	**Ron Negray** (2)	17,577	36–44
81	July 16	@ Cardinals	2–0	**Harvey Haddix** (8–3)	Willard Schmidt (4–5)	None	9,462	37–44
82	July 17	@ Cubs	2–3 (16)	Turk Lown (5–3)	**Jack Meyer** (6–5)	None	4,192	37–45
83	July 18 (1)	@ Cubs	6–4	**Robin Roberts** (10–10)	Jim Brosnan (2–4)	None	see 2nd game	38–45
84	July 18 (2)	@ Cubs	6–1	**Curt Simmons** (5–6)	Jim Davis (3–4)	None	14,331	39–45
85	July 19	@ Cubs	3–4 (10)	Turk Lown (6–3)	**Bob Miller** (1–3)	None	4,348	39–46
86	July 20	@ Braves	0–10	Bob Buhl (12–4)	**Stu Miller** (4–8)	None	28,134	39–47
87	July 21	@ Braves	8–5 (15)	**Stu Miller** (5–8)	Lou Sleater (1–2)	**Jack Meyer** (2)	34,764	40–47
88	July 22 (1)	@ Braves	7–8	Ray Crone (9–5)	**Robin Roberts** (10–11)	Dave Jolly (6)	see 2nd game	40–48
89	July 22 (2)	@ Braves	5–16	Lew Burdette (12–4)	**Ron Negray** (1–1)	Taylor Phillips (1)	39,679	40–49
90	July 24	Cardinals	7–3	**Curt Simmons** (6–6)	Vinegar Bend Mizell (9–8)	None	16,775	41–49
91	July 25	Cardinals	7–8 (10)	Larry Jackson (1–0)	**Ron Negray** (1–2)	None	17,024	41–50
92	July 26	Cardinals	9–14	Herm Wehmeier (5–8)	**Bob Miller** (1–4)	Jackie Collum (4)	15,078	41–51
93	July 27	Braves	5–2	**Saul Rogovin** (6–4)	Lew Burdette (12–5)	None	20,103	42–51
–	July 28	Braves	Postponed (rain); Makeup: September 13 as a traditional double-header					
94	July 29	Braves	5–2	**Curt Simmons** (7–6)	Warren Spahn (10–8)	None	16,972	43–51
95	July 30 (1)	Cubs	5–4	**Robin Roberts** (11–11)	Vito Valentinetti (5–2)	None	see 2nd game	44–51
96	July 30 (2)	Cubs	4–2	**Harvey Haddix** (9–3)	Warren Hacker (2–9)	None	20,536	45–51
97	July 31	Cubs	4–9	Sam Jones (5–10)	**Stu Miller** (5–9)	Turk Lown (9)	13,788	45–52

August (14–13)

#	Date	Opponent	Score	Win	Loss	Save	Attendance	Record
98	August 1	Cubs	10–8	**Robin Roberts** (12–11)	Vito Valentinetti (5–3)	None	7,520	46–52
99	August 3	Redlegs	6–3	**Curt Simmons** (8–6)	Brooks Lawrence (15–3)	None	28,607	47–52
100	August 4	Redlegs	10–6	**Robin Roberts** (13–11)	Hersh Freeman (9–4)	None	11,321	48–52
–	August 5 (1)	Redlegs	Postponed (rain); Makeup: September 18 as a traditional double-header					
–	August 5 (2)	Redlegs	Postponed (rain); Makeup: September 19 as a traditional double-header					
–	August 6	@ Giants	Postponed (rain); Makeup: August 7 as a traditional double-header					
101	August 7 (1)	@ Giants	4–3	**Harvey Haddix** (10–3)	Hoyt Wilhelm (2–7)	**Bob Miller** (5)	see 2nd game	49–52
102	August 7 (1)	@ Giants	3–1	**Curt Simmons** (9–6)	Johnny Antonelli (9–12)	None	7,648	50–52
103	August 8	@ Giants	8–3	**Robin Roberts** (14–11)	Jim Hearn (4–11)	None	3,485	51–52
104	August 9	@ Giants	2–5	Joe Margoneri (4–2)	**Saul Rogovin** (6–5)	Marv Grissom (6)	2,552	51–53
105	August 10	@ Dodgers	3–2	**Jack Meyer** (7–5)	Sal Maglie (5–4)	**Harvey Haddix** (2)	16,025	52–53
106	August 11	@ Dodgers	2–5	Don Newcombe (18–5)	**Bob Miller** (1–5)	None	12,652	52–54
107	August 12	@ Dodgers	3–7	Roger Craig (11–7)	**Robin Roberts** (14–12)	Clem Labine (14)	17,076	52–55
108	August 14 (1)	Pirates	3–0	**Harvey Haddix** (11–3)	Bob Friend (13–12)	None	see 2nd game	53–55
109	August 14 (2)	Pirates	11–2	**Curt Simmons** (10–6)	Red Munger (3–3)	None	32,873	54–55
110	August 15	Pirates	1–5	Ron Kline (10–13)	**Jack Meyer** (7–6)	None	12,337	54–56
111	August 16	Pirates	1–4	Vern Law (6–13)	**Robin Roberts** (14–13)	None	7,070	54–57
112	August 17	Dodgers	3–2	**Ron Negray** (2–2)	Roger Craig (11–8)	None	25,005	55–57
113	August 18	Dodgers	2–9	Sal Maglie (6–4)	**Harvey Haddix** (11–4)	None	30,168	55–58
114	August 19	Dodgers	2–3	Don Newcombe (19–6)	**Curt Simmons** (10–7)	Clem Labine (15)	22,891	55–59
115	August 21	@ Cubs	4–6	Sam Jones (7–11)	**Robin Roberts** (14–14)	Turk Lown (12)	6,750	55–60
116	August 22	@ Cubs	3–8	Bob Rush (12–6)	**Harvey Haddix** (11–5)	None	5,782	55–61
117	August 23	@ Braves	5–11	Ray Crone (10–8)	**Curt Simmons** (10–8)	Ernie Johnson (6)	25,493	55–62
118	August 24	@ Braves	1–6	Warren Spahn (15–9)	**Robin Roberts** (14–15)	None	31,774	55–63
119	August 25	@ Braves	3–0	**Bob Miller** (2–5)	Lew Burdette (16–8)	None	29,826	56–63
120	August 26 (1)	@ Redlegs	5–10	Art Fowler (9–10)	**Ron Negray** (2–3)	None	see 2nd game	56–64
121	August 26 (2)	@ Redlegs	11–4	**Harvey Haddix** (12–5)	Brooks Lawrence (16–8)	None	28,361	57–64
122	August 28	@ Cardinals	6–4	**Curt Simmons** (11–8)	Lindy McDaniel (4–5)	None	11,987	58–64
123	August 29	@ Cardinals	8–6	**Robin Roberts** (15–15)	Bob Blaylock (1–5)	None	7,828	59–64
124	August 31	@ Pirates	3–6	Ron Kline (12–15)	**Granny Hamner** (0–1)	Howie Pollet (2)	11,147	59–65

September (12–18)

#	Date	Opponent	Score	Win	Loss	Save	Attendance	Record
125	September 1	@ Pirates	3–2	**Saul Rogovin** (7–5)	Dick Hall (0–7)	None	5,071	60–65
126	September 2 (1)	@ Pirates	6–10	Vern Law (7–14)	**Curt Simmons** (11–9)	None	see 2nd game	60–66
127	September 2 (2)	@ Pirates	1–5	Cholly Naranjo (1–1)	**Robin Roberts** (15–16)	None	12,470	60–67
128	September 3 (1)	Giants	5–1	**Bob Miller** (3–5)	Joe Margoneri (5–5)	None	see 2nd game	61–67
129	September 3 (2)	Giants	1–2	Steve Ridzik (5–2)	**Jack Meyer** (7–7)	Hoyt Wilhelm (8)	19,898	61–68
130	September 4	Giants	2–7	Max Surkont (2–1)	**Harvey Haddix** (12–6)	None	6,049	61–69
131	September 5	Giants	4–5 (10)	Dick Littlefield (3–5)	**Jack Meyer** (7–8)	None	6,532	61–70
132	September 7	Pirates	5–2	**Robin Roberts** (16–16)	Bob Friend (15–15)	None	7,835	62–70
133	September 8	Pirates	4–5	Roy Face (11–9)	**Ben Flowers** (1–2)	Dick Hall (1)	4,806	62–71
134	September 9 (1)	Pirates	1–4 (10)	Ron Kline (13–16)	**Bob Miller** (3–6)	Roy Face (5)	see 2nd game	62–72
135	September 9 (2)	Pirates	6–5 (10)	**Robin Roberts** (17–16)	Cholly Naranjo (1–2)	None	11,104	63–72
136	September 11	Cardinals	3–5	Herm Wehmeier (11–9)	**Curt Simmons** (11–10)	Larry Jackson (9)	7,609	63–73
137	September 13 (1)	Braves	2–3 (13)	Taylor Phillips (5–2)	**Jack Meyer** (7–9)	None	see 2nd game	63–74
138	September 13 (2)	Braves	3–4 (12)	Warren Spahn (17–10)	**Ben Flowers** (1–3)	None	23,826	63–75
139	September 14	Braves	13–1^{^{[b]}}	**Harvey Haddix** (13–6)	Lew Burdette (18–10)	None	17,016	64–75
140	September 15	Braves	6–5	**Curt Simmons** (12–10)	Bob Trowbridge (3–2)	**Robin Roberts** (3)	9,231	65–75
141	September 16 (1)	Cubs	4–7	Warren Hacker (3–12)	**Saul Rogovin** (7–6)	Turk Lown (13)	see 2nd game	65–76
142	September 16 (2)	Cubs	4–1	**Jack Sanford** (1–0)	Sam Jones (9–14)	**Ron Negray** (3)	7,408	66–76
143	September 18 (1)	Redlegs	4–3	**Curt Simmons** (13–10)	Larry Jansen (2–2)	None	see 2nd game	67–76
144	September 18 (2)	Redlegs	7–4	**Robin Roberts** (18–16)	Art Fowler (11–11)	None	21,224	68–76
145	September 19 (1)	Redlegs	3–6	Johnny Klippstein (12–11)	**Jack Meyer** (7–10)	Hersh Freeman (14)	see 2nd game	68–77
146	September 19 (2)	Redlegs	0–6	Tom Acker (3–3)	**Harvey Haddix** (13–7)	None	13,614	68–78
147	September 21	@ Giants	3–7	Johnny Antonelli (18–13)	**Turk Farrell** (0–1)	None	3,231	68–79
148	September 22	@ Giants	1–2	Al Worthington (6–14)	**Robin Roberts** (18–17)	None	2,496	68–80
149	September 23	@ Giants	6–2	**Curt Simmons** (14–10)	Rubén Gómez (7–17)	None	6,134	69–80
150	September 25	@ Dodgers	0–5	Sal Maglie (12–5)	**Jack Meyer** (7–11)	None	15,204	69–81
151	September 16	@ Dodgers	7–3	**Robin Roberts** (19–17)	Don Newcombe (26–7)	None	7,847	70–81
–	September 28	Giants	Postponed (rain); Makeup: September 30 as a traditional double-header					
152	September 29	Giants	0–2	Johnny Antonelli (20–13)	**Harvey Haddix** (13–8)	None	4,867	70–82
153	September 30 (1)	Giants	3–8	Al Worthington (7–14)	**Robin Roberts** (19–18)	Windy McCall (7)	see 2nd game	70–83
154	September 30 (2)	Giants	5–2	**Curt Simmons** (15–10)	Roy Wright (0–1)	None	7,406	71–83

^{^[a]}The second game on May 13 was suspended (Sunday curfew) in the top of the eighth inning with the score 6–2 and was completed July 3, 1956.
^{^[b]}The September 14, 1956, game was protested by the Braves in the bottom of the second inning. The protest was later denied.

=== Roster ===
1956 Philadelphia Phillies
**Roster**
**Pitchers**: 20 Murry Dickson; 44 Turk Farrell; 22 Ben Flowers; 20 Harvey Haddix; 45 Angelo LiPetri; 42 Jack Meyer; 19 Bob Miller; 25 Stu Miller; 38 Ron Negray; 39 Jim Owens; 33 Duane Pillette; 36 Robin Roberts; 26 Saul Rogovin; 30 Bob Ross; 48 Jack Sanford; 28 Curt Simmons; 22 Herm Wehmeier	**Catchers**: 34 Mack Burk; 35 Joe Lonnett; 29 Stan Lopata; 21 Andy Seminick; **Infielders**: 12 Marv Blaylock; 39 Ed Bouchee; 2 Granny Hamner; 4 Solly Hemus; 6 Willie Jones; 7 Ted Kazanski; 4 Bobby Morgan; 17 Roy Smalley Jr.	**Outfielders**: 1 Richie Ashburn; 16 Frank Baumholtz; 8 Bob Bowman; 14 Del Ennis; 9 Glen Gorbous; 23 Jim Greengrass; 15 Elmer Valo; **Other batters**: 48,15 Wally Westlake	**Manager**: 24 Mayo Smith; **Coaches**: 11 Benny Bengough; 40 Maje McDonnell; 32 Wally Moses; 31 Whit Wyatt

== Player stats ==
=== Batting ===
==== Starters by position ====
Note: Pos = Position; G = Games played; AB = At bats; H = Hits; Avg. = Batting average; HR = Home runs; RBI = Runs batted in

Pos	Player	G	AB	H	Avg.	HR	RBI
C	Stan Lopata	146	535	143	.267	32	95
1B	Marv Blaylock	136	460	117	.254	10	50
2B	Ted Kazanski	117	379	80	.211	4	34
SS	Granny Hamner	122	401	90	.224	4	42
3B	Willie Jones	149	520	144	.277	17	78
LF	Del Ennis	153	630	164	.260	26	95
CF	Richie Ashburn	154	628	190	.303	3	50
RF	Elmer Valo	98	291	84	.289	5	37

==== Other batters ====
Note: G = Games played; AB = At bats; H = Hits; Avg. = Batting average; HR = Home runs; RBI = Runs batted in

Player	G	AB	H	Avg.	HR	RBI
Jim Greengrass	86	215	44	.205	5	25
Solly Hemus	78	187	54	.289	5	24
Roy Smalley Jr.	65	168	38	.226	0	16
Andy Seminick	60	161	32	.199	7	23
Frank Baumholtz	78	100	27	.270	0	9
Glen Gorbous	15	33	6	.182	0	1
Bobby Morgan	8	25	5	.200	0	1
Ed Bouchee	9	22	6	.273	0	1
Joe Lonnett	16	22	4	.182	0	0
Bob Bowman	6	16	3	.188	1	2
Wally Westlake	5	4	0	.000	0	0
Mack Burk	15	1	1	1.000	0	0

=== Pitching ===
==== Starting pitchers ====
Note: G = Games pitched; IP = Innings pitched; W = Wins; L = Losses; ERA = Earned run average; SO = Strikeouts

Player	G	IP	W	L	ERA	SO
Robin Roberts	43	297.1	19	18	4.45	157
Harvey Haddix	31	206.2	12	8	3.48	154
Curt Simmons	33	198.0	15	10	3.36	88
Saul Rogovin	22	106.2	7	6	4.98	48
Murry Dickson	3	23.0	0	3	5.09	1
Herm Wehmeier	3	20.0	0	2	4.05	8
Turk Farrell	1	4.1	0	1	12.46	0

==== Other pitchers ====
Note: G = Games pitched; IP = Innings pitched; W = Wins; L = Losses; ERA = Earned run average; SO = Strikeouts

Player	G	IP	W	L	ERA	SO
Stu Miller	24	106.2	5	8	4.47	55
Jim Owens	10	29.2	0	4	7.28	22
Jack Sanford	3	13.0	1	0	1.38	6

==== Relief pitchers ====
Note: G = Games pitched; W = Wins; L = Losses; SV = Saves; ERA = Earned run average; SO = Strikeouts

Player	G	W	L	SV	ERA	SO
Bob Miller	49	3	6	5	3.24	53
Jack Meyer	41	7	11	2	4.41	66
Ron Negray	39	2	3	3	4.19	44
Ben Flowers	32	0	2	0	5.71	22
Duane Pillette	20	0	0	0	6.56	10
Angelo LiPetri	6	0	0	0	3.27	8
Granny Hamner	3	0	1	0	4.32	4
Bob Ross	3	0	0	0	8.10	4

== Farm system ==
Level	Team	League	Manager
AAA	Miami Marlins	International League	Don Osborn
A	Schenectady Blue Jays	Eastern League	Dick Carter
B	Wilson Tobs	Carolina League	Charlie Gassaway
C	Bakersfield Boosters	California League	Art Lilly and Dick Wilson
C	Salt Lake City Bees	Pioneer League	Frank Lucchesi
D	Tifton Phillies	Georgia–Florida League	Wes Griffin and Eddie Miller
D	Mattoon Phillies	Midwest League	Benny Zientara
D	Olean Oilers	PONY League	Paul Owens

LEAGUE CHAMPIONS: Schenectady
