= 1956 St. Louis Cardinals season =

Major League Baseball season

1956 St. Louis Cardinals
- League: National League
- Ballpark: Busch Stadium I
- City: St. Louis, Missouri
- Record: 76–78 (.494)
- League place: 4th
- Owners: August "Gussie" Busch
- General managers: Frank Lane
- Managers: Fred Hutchinson
- Television: KTVI
- Radio: KMOX (Harry Caray, Jack Buck, Joe Garagiola)
- Stats: ESPN.com; Baseball Reference

The 1956 St. Louis Cardinals season was the team's 75th season in St. Louis, Missouri, and its 65th season in the National League. The Cardinals went 76–78 during the season and finished fourth in the National League.

== Offseason ==
- October 20, 1955: Harry Walker was released by the Cardinals.
- November 27, 1955: Ed Mayer was drafted by the Cardinals from the Boston Red Sox in the 1955 minor league draft.
- November 27, 1955: Billy Muffett was drafted by the Cardinals from the Chicago Cubs in the 1955 rule 5 draft.
- January 31, 1956: Brooks Lawrence and Sonny Senerchia were traded by the Cardinals to the Cincinnati Redlegs for Jackie Collum.
- March 30, 1956: Pete Whisenant was traded by the Cardinals to the Chicago Cubs for Hank Sauer.

== Regular season ==
=== Season standings ===
National League
Team	W	L	Pct.	GB	Home	Road
Brooklyn Dodgers	93	61	.604	—	52‍–‍25	41‍–‍36
Milwaukee Braves	92	62	.597	1	47‍–‍29	45‍–‍33
Cincinnati Redlegs	91	63	.591	2	51‍–‍26	40‍–‍37
St. Louis Cardinals	76	78	.494	17	43‍–‍34	33‍–‍44
Philadelphia Phillies	71	83	.461	22	40‍–‍37	31‍–‍46
New York Giants	67	87	.435	26	37‍–‍40	30‍–‍47
Pittsburgh Pirates	66	88	.429	27	35‍–‍43	31‍–‍45
Chicago Cubs	60	94	.390	33	39‍–‍38	21‍–‍56

=== Record vs. opponents ===
1956 National League record Sources:
Team	BRO	CHC	CIN	MIL	NYG	PHI	PIT	STL
Brooklyn	—	16–6	11–11	10–12	14–8	13–9	13–9	16–6
Chicago	6–16	—	6–16–1	9–13	7–15	13–9	10–12–1	9–13–1
Cincinnati	11–11	16–6–1	—	9–13	14–8	11–11	17–5	13–9
Milwaukee	12–10	13–9	13–9	—	17–5	10–12	14–8–1	13–9
New York	8–14	15–7	8–14	5–17	—	11–11	13–9	7–15
Philadelphia	9–13	9–13	11–11	12–10	11–11	—	7–15	12–10
Pittsburgh	9–13	12–10–1	5–17	8–14–1	9–13	15–7	—	8–14–1
St. Louis	6–16	13–9–1	9–13	9–13	15–7	10–12	14–8–1	—

=== Notable transactions ===
- May 14, 1956: Solly Hemus was traded by the Cardinals to the Philadelphia Phillies for Bobby Morgan.
- May 17, 1956: Bill Virdon was traded by the Cardinals to the Pittsburgh Pirates for Dick Littlefield and Bobby Del Greco.
- May 28, 1956: The Cardinals traded cash and a player to be named later to the Pittsburgh Pirates for Toby Atwell. The Cardinals completed the deal by sending Dick Rand to the Pirates on October 14.
- June 14, 1956: Red Schoendienst, Jackie Brandt, Dick Littlefield, Bill Sarni, and a player to be named later were traded by the Cardinals to the New York Giants for Alvin Dark, Ray Katt, Don Liddle, and Whitey Lockman. The Cardinals completed the deal by sending Gordon Jones to the Giants on October 1.

=== Roster ===
1956 St. Louis Cardinals
Roster
Pitchers: 24 Bob Blaylock; 32 Jackie Collum; 36 Murry Dickson; 37 Ben Flowers; 42 Harvey Haddix; 39 Larry Jackson; 45 Gordon Jones; 16 Ellis Kinder; 25 Jim Konstanty; 35 Paul LaPalme; 21 Don Liddle; 45 Dick Littlefield; 41 Lindy McDaniel; 36 Stu Miller; 17 Vinegar Bend Mizell; 23 Tom Poholsky; 44 Willard Schmidt; 25 Max Surkont; 37 Herm Wehmeier	Catchers: 30 Walker Cooper; 15 Ray Katt; 15 Bill Sarni; 18 Hal Smith; Infielders: 22 Tom Alston; 3 Don Blasingame; 14 Ken Boyer; 28 Joe Cunningham; 11 Alvin Dark; 4 Alex Grammas; 28 Grady Hatton; 42 Bobby Morgan; 6 Stan Musial; 7 Rocky Nelson; 2 Red Schoendienst; 19 Dick Schofield	Outfielders: 21 Jackie Brandt; 9 Bobby Del Greco; 24 Joe Frazier; 24 Chuck Harmon; 2 Whitey Lockman; 20 Wally Moon; 38 Charlie Peete; 8 Rip Repulski; 10 Hank Sauer; 9 Bill Virdon; Other batters: 7 Solly Hemus	Manager: 29 Fred Hutchinson; Coaches: 40 Johnny Hopp; 34 Terry Moore; 33 Bill Posedel

== Player stats ==
=== Batting ===
==== Starters by position ====
Note: Pos = Position; G = Games played; AB = At bats; H = Hits; Avg. = Batting average; HR = Home runs; RBI = Runs batted in

Pos	Player	G	AB	H	Avg.	HR	RBI
C	Hal Smith	75	227	64	.282	5	23
1B	Stan Musial	156	594	184	.310	27	109
2B	Don Blasingame	150	587	153	.261	0	27
SS	Alvin Dark	100	413	118	.286	4	37
3B	Ken Boyer	150	595	182	.306	26	98
LF	Rip Repulski	112	376	104	.277	11	55
CF	Bobby Del Greco	102	270	58	.215	5	18
RF	Wally Moon	149	540	161	.298	16	68

==== Other batters ====
Note: G = Games played; AB = At bats; H = Hits; Avg. = Batting average; HR = Home runs; RBI = Runs batted in

Player	G	AB	H	Avg.	HR	RBI
Whitey Lockman	70	193	48	.249	0	10
Ray Katt	47	158	41	.259	6	20
Red Schoendienst	40	153	48	.314	0	15
Hank Sauer	75	151	45	.298	5	24
Bill Sarni	43	148	43	.291	5	22
Bobby Morgan	61	113	22	.195	3	20
Grady Hatton	44	73	18	.247	0	7
Bill Virdon	24	71	15	.211	2	9
Walker Cooper	40	68	18	.265	2	14
Rocky Nelson	38	56	13	.232	3	8
Charlie Peete	23	52	10	.192	0	6
Jackie Brandt	27	42	12	.286	1	3
Ducky Schofield	16	30	3	.100	0	1
Joe Frazier	14	19	4	.211	1	4
Chuck Harmon	20	15	0	.000	0	0
Alex Grammas	6	12	3	.250	0	1
Solly Hemus	8	5	1	.200	0	2
Joe Cunningham	4	3	0	.000	0	0
Tom Alston	3	2	0	.000	0	0

=== Pitching ===
==== Starting pitchers ====
Note: G = Games pitched; IP = Innings pitched; W = Wins; L = Losses; ERA = Earned run average; SO = Strikeouts

Player	G	IP	W	L	ERA	SO
Vinegar Bend Mizell	33	208.2	14	14	3.62	153
Tom Poholsky	33	203.0	9	14	3.59	95
Murry Dickson	28	196.1	13	8	3.07	109
Harvey Haddix	4	23.2	1	0	5.32	16
Ben Flowers	3	11.2	1	1	6.94	5

==== Other pitchers ====
Note: G = Games pitched; IP = Innings pitched; W = Wins; L = Losses; ERA = Earned run average; SO = Strikeouts

Player	G	IP	W	L	ERA	SO
Herm Wehmeier	34	170.2	12	9	3.69	68
Willard Schmidt	33	147.2	6	8	3.84	52
Lindy McDaniel	39	116.1	7	6	3.40	59
Bob Blaylock	14	41.0	1	6	6.37	39
Gordon Jones	5	11.1	0	2	5.56	6
Dick Littlefield	3	9.2	0	2	7.45	5

==== Relief pitchers ====
Note: G = Games pitched; W = Wins; L = Losses; SV = Saves; ERA = Earned run average; SO = Strikeouts

Player	G	W	L	SV	ERA	SO
Larry Jackson	51	2	2	10	4.11	50
Jackie Collum	38	6	2	7	4.20	17
Jim Konstanty	27	1	1	5	4.58	7
Ellis Kinder	22	2	0	6	3.51	4
Don Liddle	14	1	2	0	3.39	14
Max Surkont	5	0	0	0	9.53	5
Stu Miller	3	0	1	1	4.91	5
Paul LaPalme	1	0	0	0	81.00	0

== Farm system ==
Level	Team	League	Manager
AAA	Omaha Cardinals	American Association	Johnny Keane
AAA	Rochester Red Wings	International League	Dixie Walker
AA	Houston Buffaloes	Texas League	Harry Walker
A	Allentown Cardinals	Eastern League	Roland LeBlanc
A	Sioux City Soos	Western League	Harold Olt and Bob Clear
B	Beaumont Exporters	Big State League	Ford Garrison
B	Peoria Chiefs	Illinois–Indiana–Iowa League	George Kissell
C	Mexicali Eagles	Arizona–Texas League	Larry Barton, Sr. and Art Wilson
C	Fresno Cardinals	California League	Ed Lyons
C	Winnipeg Goldeyes	Northern League	Vern Benson
D	Dothan Cardinals	Alabama–Florida League	Whitey Ries
D	Gainesville G-Men	Florida State League	Homer Ray Wilson
D	Albany Cardinals	Georgia–Florida League	Chase Riddle
D	Decatur Commodores	Midwest League	Al Unser
D	Ardmore Cardinals	Sooner State League	J. C. Dunn

LEAGUE CHAMPIONS: Rochester, Houston, Fresno
