= 1956 Milwaukee Braves season =

Major League Baseball season

1956 Milwaukee Braves
- League: National League
- Ballpark: Milwaukee County Stadium
- City: Milwaukee, Wisconsin
- Record: 92–62 (.597)
- League place: 2nd
- Owners: Louis R. Perini
- General managers: John J. Quinn
- Managers: Charlie Grimm 24–22 (.522); Fred Haney 68–40 (.630)
- Radio: WEMP; WTMJ (Earl Gillespie, Blaine Walsh)

The 1956 Milwaukee Braves season was the fourth in Milwaukee and the 86th overall season of the franchise. The Braves finished in second place in the National League, just one game behind the Brooklyn Dodgers in the league standings, and one game ahead of the Cincinnati Reds. All three teams posted wins on the final day of the season; the Braves had entered the final three games with a game advantage, but dropped the first two at St. Louis while the Dodgers swept the Pirates.

The Braves' led the major leagues in home attendance with 2,046,331; next closest was the New York Yankees of the American League at under 1.5 million. The runner-up in NL attendance was champion Brooklyn at under 1.22 million. The Braves averaged 30,093 for the 68 home dates.

== Regular season ==
=== Season summary ===
Under opening day manager Charlie Grimm, the Braves got off to a mediocre start at 24–22 (.522). After a loss on Saturday, June 16, the owners dismissed him and replaced him with Fred Haney, who led the Braves to a 68–40 (.630) record for the rest of the season. Finishing at 92–62 (.597), the Braves nearly caught up with the Dodgers, who finished a game ahead at 93–61 (.604). Haney managed the Braves to the World Series in 1957 and 1958, and then to a tie atop the National League standings in 1959, tied with the Los Angeles Dodgers.

In individual performance statistics, outfielder Hank Aaron led the league in hits with 200, in batting average at .328, and in doubles with 34. His 106 runs scored led the Braves. First baseman Joe Adcock led the Braves with 38 home runs and 103 runs batted in. The Braves' other hitting star was their third baseman, Eddie Mathews, who played in 151 games, hit 37 home runs, scored 103 runs, and batted in 95 runs.

The pitching leaders for the Braves were their "big three" starting pitchers (listed with their won-loss records): Warren Spahn (20–11 (.645)), Lew Burdette (19–10 (.655)), and Bob Buhl (18–8 (.692)). Spahn also recorded three saves among the four games in which he was used as a relief pitcher.

Outfielder Bobby Thomson also had his best season, out of three, with the Braves, with 142 games played, 20 home runs, and 74 runs batted in, but just a .235 batting average. Then, the next season, Thomson was traded back to the New York Giants.

=== Season standings ===
National League
Team	W	L	Pct.	GB	Home	Road
Brooklyn Dodgers	93	61	.604	—	52‍–‍25	41‍–‍36
Milwaukee Braves	92	62	.597	1	47‍–‍29	45‍–‍33
Cincinnati Redlegs	91	63	.591	2	51‍–‍26	40‍–‍37
St. Louis Cardinals	76	78	.494	17	43‍–‍34	33‍–‍44
Philadelphia Phillies	71	83	.461	22	40‍–‍37	31‍–‍46
New York Giants	67	87	.435	26	37‍–‍40	30‍–‍47
Pittsburgh Pirates	66	88	.429	27	35‍–‍43	31‍–‍45
Chicago Cubs	60	94	.390	33	39‍–‍38	21‍–‍56

=== Record vs. opponents ===
1956 National League record Sources:
Team	BRO	CHC	CIN	MIL	NYG	PHI	PIT	STL
Brooklyn	—	16–6	11–11	10–12	14–8	13–9	13–9	16–6
Chicago	6–16	—	6–16–1	9–13	7–15	13–9	10–12–1	9–13–1
Cincinnati	11–11	16–6–1	—	9–13	14–8	11–11	17–5	13–9
Milwaukee	12–10	13–9	13–9	—	17–5	10–12	14–8–1	13–9
New York	8–14	15–7	8–14	5–17	—	11–11	13–9	7–15
Philadelphia	9–13	9–13	11–11	12–10	11–11	—	7–15	12–10
Pittsburgh	9–13	12–10–1	5–17	8–14–1	9–13	15–7	—	8–14–1
St. Louis	6–16	13–9–1	9–13	9–13	15–7	10–12	14–8–1	—

=== Roster ===
1956 Milwaukee Braves
Roster
Pitchers: 10 Bob Buhl; 33 Lew Burdette; 22 Gene Conley; 20 Ray Crone; 32 Ernie Johnson; 16 Dave Jolly; 19 Red Murff; 17 Chet Nichols Jr.; 11 Phil Paine; 17 Taylor Phillips; 49 Humberto Robinson; 36 Lou Sleater; 21 Warren Spahn; 12,30 Bob Trowbridge	Catchers: 39 Toby Atwell; 1 Del Crandall; 7 Del Rice; 24 Bob Roselli; Infielders: 9 Joe Adcock; 6 Jack Dittmer; 23 Johnny Logan; 5 Félix Mantilla; 41 Eddie Mathews; 4 Danny O'Connell; 3 Jim Pendleton; 14,37 Frank Torre	Outfielders: 44 Hank Aaron; 38 Bill Bruton; 43 Wes Covington; 28 Earl Hersh; 48 Andy Pafko; 18 Chuck Tanner; 25,34 Bobby Thomson	Manager: 40 Charlie Grimm; 2 Fred Haney; Coaches: 2 Fred Haney; 35 Bob Keely; 28,8 Johnny Riddle; 31 Charlie Root

== Player stats ==
=== Batting ===
==== Starters by position ====
Note: Pos = Position; G = Games played; AB = At bats; R = Runs; H = Hits; Avg. = Batting average; HR = Home runs; RBI = Runs batted in

Pos	Player	G	AB	R	H	Avg.	HR	RBI
C	Del Crandall	112	311	37	74	.238	16	48
1B	Joe Adcock	137	454	76	132	.291	38	103
2B	Danny O'Connell	139	498	71	119	.239	2	42
3B	Eddie Mathews	151	552	103	150	.272	37	95
SS	Johnny Logan	148	545	69	153	.281	15	46
LF	Bobby Thomson	142	451	59	106	.235	20	74
CF	Bill Bruton	147	525	73	143	.272	8	56
RF	Hank Aaron	153	609	106	200	.328	26	92

==== Other batters ====
Note: G = Games played; AB = At bats; H = Hits; Avg. = Batting average; HR = Home runs; RBI = Runs batted in

Player	G	AB	H	Avg.	HR	RBI
Del Rice	71	188	40	.213	3	17
Frank Torre	111	159	41	.258	0	16
Wes Covington	75	138	39	.283	2	16
Jack Dittmer	44	102	25	.245	1	6
Andy Pafko	45	93	24	.258	2	9
Chuck Tanner	60	63	15	.238	1	4
Félix Mantilla	35	53	15	.283	0	3
Toby Atwell	15	30	5	.167	2	7
Earl Hersh	7	13	3	.231	0	0
Jim Pendleton	14	11	0	.000	0	0
Bob Roselli	4	2	1	.500	1	1

=== Pitching ===
==== Starting pitchers ====
Note: G = Games pitched; IP = Innings pitched; W = Wins; L = Losses; ERA = Earned run average; SO = Strikeouts

Player	G	IP	W	L	ERA	SO
Warren Spahn	39	281.1	20	11	2.78	111
Lew Burdette	39	256.1	19	10	2.70	110
Bob Buhl	38	216.2	18	8	3.32	86
Ray Crone	35	169.2	11	10	3.87	73

==== Other pitchers ====
Note: G = Games pitched; IP = Innings pitched; W = Wins; L = Losses; ERA = Earned run average; SO = Strikeouts

Player	G	IP	W	L	ERA	SO
Gene Conley	35	158.1	8	9	3.13	68
Taylor Phillips	23	87.2	5	3	2.26	36
Bob Trowbridge	19	50.2	3	2	2.66	40

==== Relief pitchers ====
Note: G = Games pitched; W = Wins; L = Losses; SV = Saves; ERA = Earned run average; SO = Strikeouts

Player	G	W	L	SV	ERA	SO
Ernie Johnson	36	4	3	6	3.71	26
Dave Jolly	29	2	3	7	3.74	20
Lou Sleater	25	2	2	2	3.15	32
Red Murff	14	0	0	1	4.44	18
Chet Nichols Jr.	2	0	1	0	6.75	2
Humberto Robinson	1	0	0	0	0.00	0
Phil Paine	1	0	0	0	inf	0

== Farm system ==
Level	Team	League	Manager
AAA	Wichita Braves	American Association	George Selkirk
AA	Atlanta Crackers	Southern Association	Clyde King
AA	Austin Senators	Texas League	Connie Ryan
A	Jacksonville Braves	Sally League	Ben Geraghty
A	Topeka Hawks	Western League	Bud Bates
B	Corpus Christi Clippers	Big State League	Sibby Sisti
B	Evansville Braves	Illinois–Indiana–Iowa League	Bob Coleman
C	Salinas Packers	California League	Eddie Lake
C	Eau Claire Braves	Northern League	Joe Just
C	Boise Braves	Pioneer League	Mickey Livingston and George McQuinn
D	Leesburg Braves	Florida State League	Tommy Giordano
D	Waycross Braves	Georgia–Florida League	Jim Deery
D	McCook Braves	Nebraska State League	Bill Steinecke
D	Wellsville Braves	PONY League	Alex Monchak
D	Lawton Braves	Sooner State League	Travis Jackson

LEAGUE CHAMPIONS: Atlanta, Jacksonville, Evansville, Boise, Wellsville
