= List of Major League Baseball ultimate grand slams =

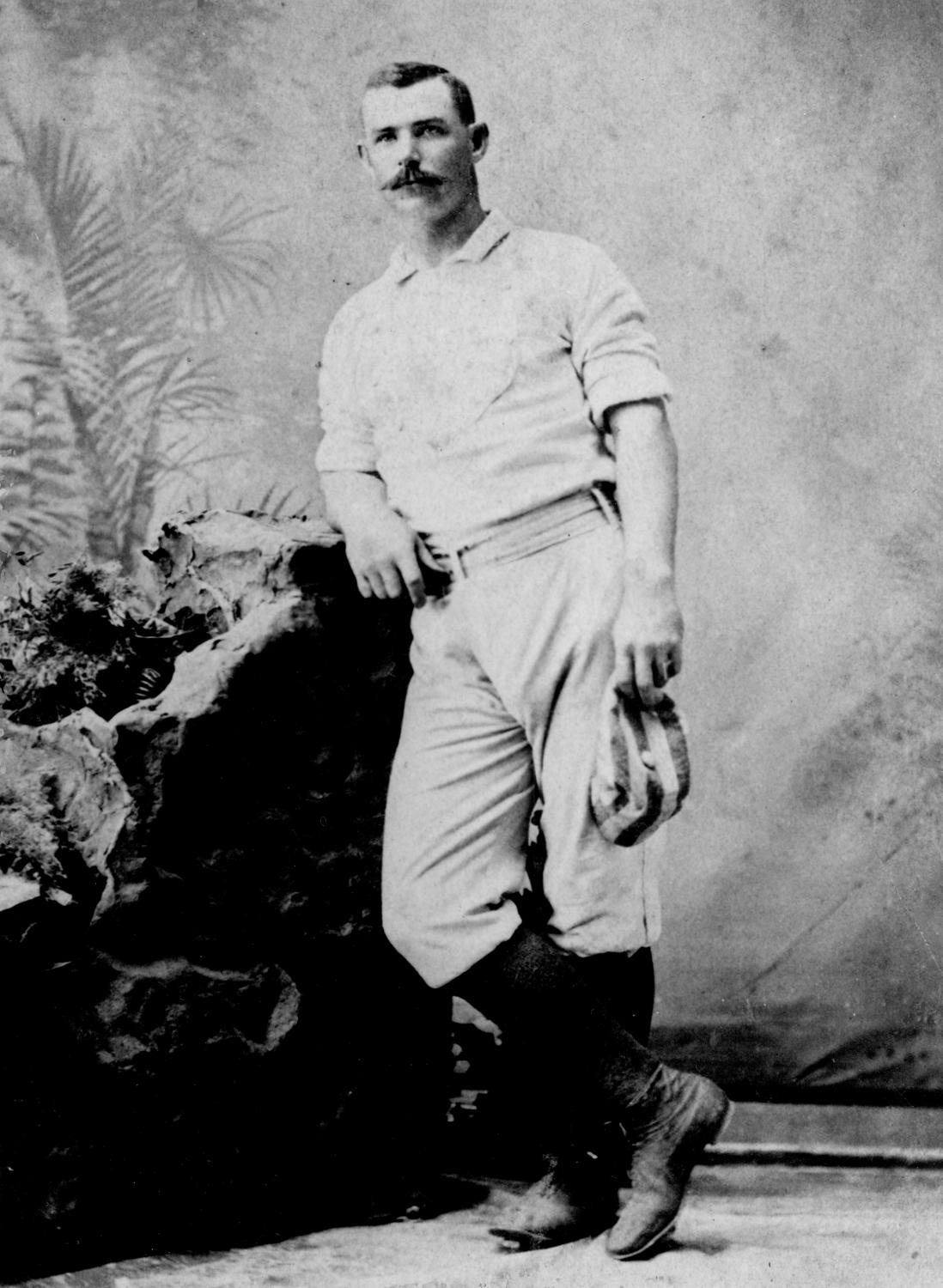
Roger Connor was the first MLB player to hit an ultimate grand slam, on September 10, 1881.

In baseball, an ultimate grand slam is a walk-off home run that occurs when the bases are loaded (i.e., there are runners on the first, second, and third bases) and the scoring team is trailing by three runs prior to the hit. As a grand slam awards the scoring team four runs, an ultimate grand slam gives the scoring team the win. It has occurred 35 times in Major League Baseball (MLB), beginning with Roger Connor on September 10, 1881. Kody Clemens is the most recent MLB player to score an ultimate grand slam, having done so on July 30, 2026. No player has hit more than one ultimate grand slam.

== Players ==
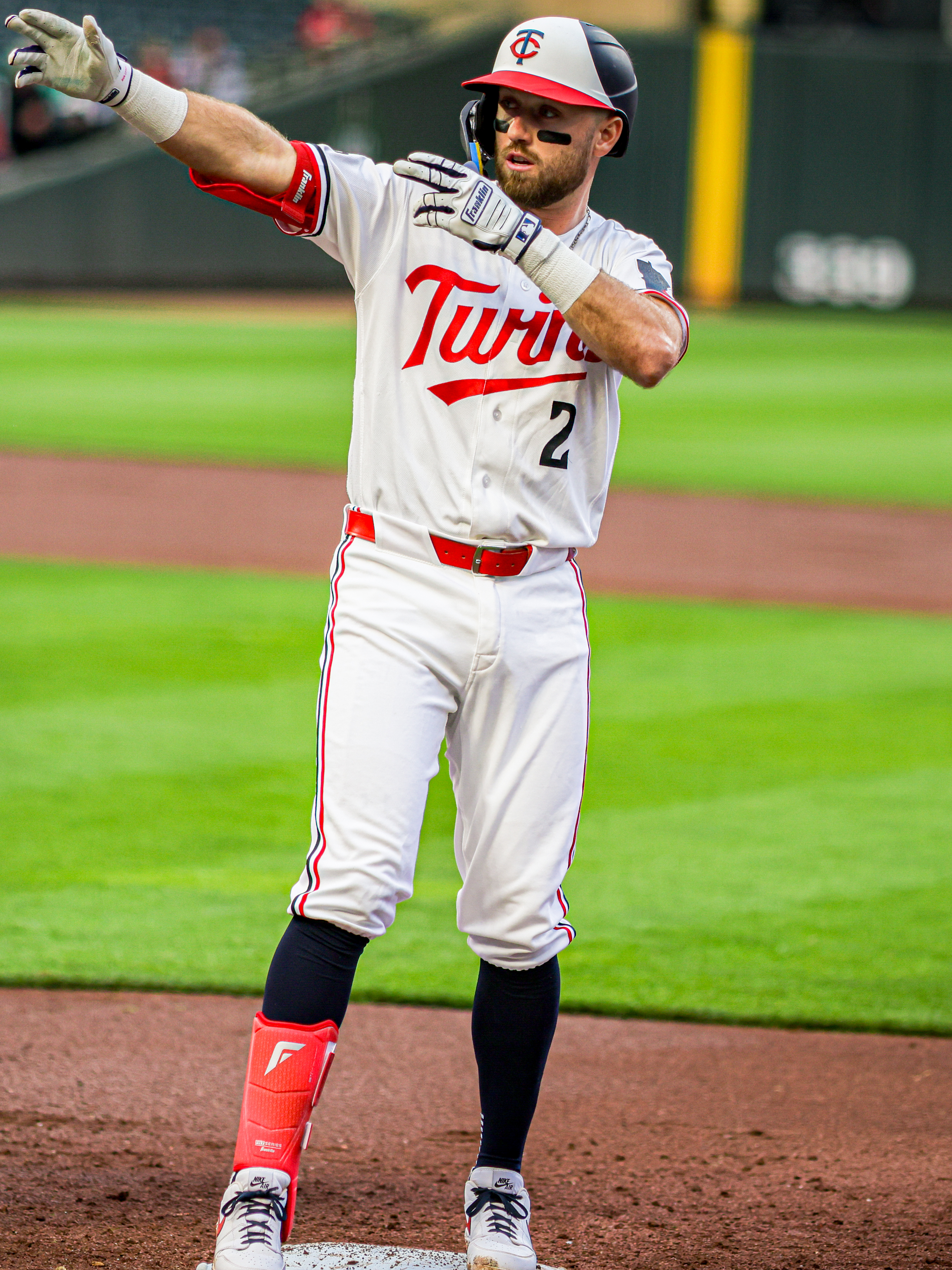
Kody Clemens is the most recent MLB player to hit an ultimate grand slam, on July 30, 2026.

Key
Player	Name of the player
Date	Date of the ultimate grand slam game
Team	The player's team at the time of the game
Opposing team	The team against whom the player hit the ultimate grand slam
Score	Final score of the game, with the player's team score listed first
†	Elected to the Baseball Hall of Fame

MLB players who have hit an ultimate grand slam
#	Player	Date	Team	Opposing team	Score	References / notes
1	Roger Connor^{†}	September 10, 1881	Troy Trojans	Worcester Worcesters	8–7	(Note: The game was originally going to be played in Troy, New York, but was moved due to weather to Riverside Park on Bonacker Island in present-day Rensselaer, New York.)
2	Babe Ruth^{†}	September 24, 1925	New York Yankees	Chicago White Sox	6–5	(Note: Ruth's ultimate grand slam was the first to occur in extra innings.)
3	Sammy Byrd	May 23, 1936	Cincinnati Reds	Pittsburgh Pirates	4–3	(Note: Byrd's ultimate grand slam was the first to be performed by a pinch hitter.)
4	Jack Phillips	July 8, 1950	Pittsburgh Pirates	St. Louis Cardinals	7–6	
5	Bobby Thomson	June 16, 1952	New York Giants	St. Louis Cardinals	8–7	
6	Eddie Joost	July 15, 1952	Philadelphia Athletics	St. Louis Browns	7–6	
7	Del Crandall	September 11, 1955	Milwaukee Braves	Philadelphia Phillies	5–4	
8	Danny Kravitz	May 11, 1956	Pittsburgh Pirates	Philadelphia Phillies	6–5	
9	Roberto Clemente^{†}	July 25, 1956	Pittsburgh Pirates	Chicago Cubs	9–8	(Note: Clemente's ultimate grand slam is the only walk-off grand slam that was also an inside-the-park home run.)
10	Ellis Burton	August 31, 1963	Chicago Cubs	Houston Colt .45s	6–5	
11	Tony Taylor	August 2, 1970	Philadelphia Phillies	San Francisco Giants	7–6	
12	Carl Taylor	August 11, 1970	St. Louis Cardinals	San Diego Padres	11–10	
13	Ron Lolich	April 22, 1973	Cleveland Indians	Boston Red Sox	8–7	
14	Roger Freed	May 1, 1979	St. Louis Cardinals	Houston Astros	7–6	
15	Bo Díaz	April 13, 1983	Philadelphia Phillies	New York Mets	10–9	
16	Buddy Bell	August 31, 1984	Texas Rangers	Milwaukee Brewers	7–6	
17	Phil Bradley	April 13, 1985	Seattle Mariners	Minnesota Twins	8–7	
18	Dick Schofield	August 29, 1986	California Angels	Detroit Tigers	13–12	
19	Alan Trammell^{†}	June 21, 1988	Detroit Tigers	New York Yankees	7–6	
20	Chris Hoiles	May 17, 1996	Baltimore Orioles	Seattle Mariners	14–13	
21	Brian Giles	July 28, 2001	Pittsburgh Pirates	Houston Astros	9–8	
22	Jason Giambi	May 17, 2002	New York Yankees	Minnesota Twins	13–12	
23	Adam Dunn	June 30, 2006	Cincinnati Reds	Cleveland Indians	9–8	
24	Brooks Conrad	May 20, 2010	Atlanta Braves	Cincinnati Reds	10–9	
25	Travis Hafner	July 7, 2011	Cleveland Indians	Toronto Blue Jays	5–4	
26	Brian Bogusevic	August 16, 2011	Houston Astros	Chicago Cubs	6–5	
27	Ryan Roberts	September 27, 2011	Arizona Diamondbacks	Los Angeles Dodgers	7–6	
28	Rajai Davis	June 30, 2014	Detroit Tigers	Oakland Athletics	5–4	
29	Steve Pearce	July 30, 2017	Toronto Blue Jays	Los Angeles Angels	11–10	
30	David Bote	August 12, 2018	Chicago Cubs	Washington Nationals	4–3	
31	Daniel Vogelbach	September 5, 2021	Milwaukee Brewers	St. Louis Cardinals	6–5	
32	Josh Donaldson	August 17, 2022	New York Yankees	Tampa Bay Rays	8–7	
33	Giancarlo Stanton	September 20, 2022	New York Yankees	Pittsburgh Pirates	9–8	
34	Bryce Eldridge	June 10, 2026	San Francisco Giants	Washington Nationals	11–10	
35	Kody Clemens	July 30, 2026	Minnesota Twins	Kansas City Royals	4–3	
