= Tex Taylor =

Tex Taylor may refer to:

- Tex Taylor (baseball), American baseball player-manager
- Tex Taylor (comics), American Western comic book
