= Bob Garber =

American baseball player (1928–1999)

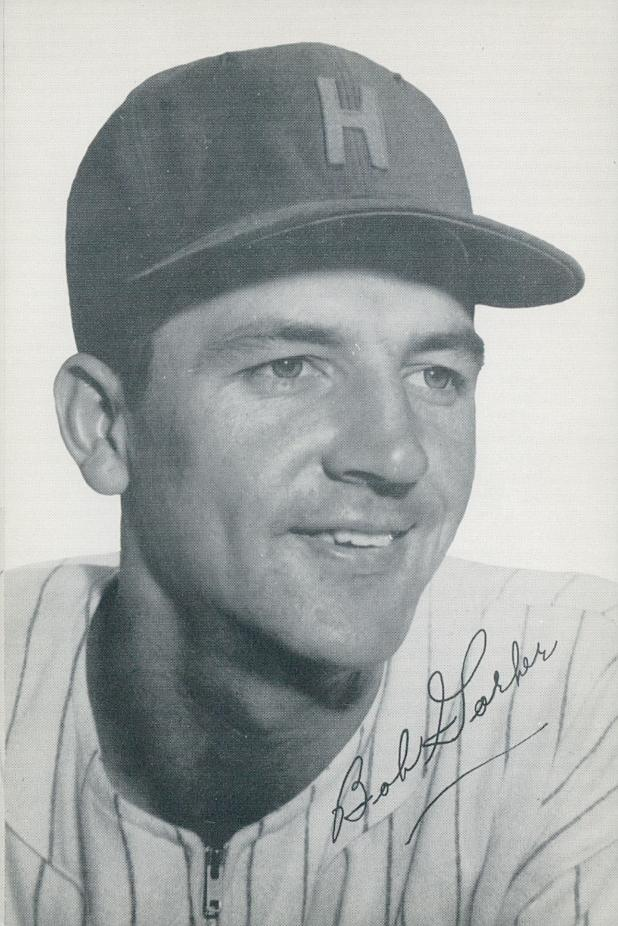
- Garber with the Hollywood Stars c. 1957
- Pitcher
- Born: September 10, 1928; Hunker, Pennsylvania, U.S.
- Died: June 7, 1999 (aged 70); Redwood City, California, U.S.
- Batted: Right Threw: Right

MLB debut
- May 13, 1956, for the Pittsburgh Pirates

Last MLB appearance
- September 23, 1956, for the Pittsburgh Pirates

MLB statistics
- Win–loss record: 0–0
- Earned run average: 2.25
- Innings pitched: 4
- Stats at Baseball Reference

Teams
- Pittsburgh Pirates (1956)

Robert Mitchell Garber (September 10, 1928 – June 7, 1999) was an American professional baseball player. The right-handed pitcher had a highly successful minor league career, twice winning 20 games and notching one 19-victory season, but made only two appearances in Major League Baseball, for the 1956 Pittsburgh Pirates. Born in Hunker, Pennsylvania, he stood 6 feet 1 inch (1.85 m) tall and weighed 190 pounds (86 kg).

Garber's 20-win seasons came in 1949 and 1955. In 1949, he won ten games in the Class D Alabama State League and another ten after his promotion to the Class B Illinois–Indiana–Iowa League. During 1955, he went 20–16 at the top level of the minors with the Hollywood Stars of the Open-Classification Pacific Coast League, and led the PCL in strikeouts. In 1954, with the Denver Bears, Garber won 19 of 27 decisions, led the Class A Western League in strikeouts, and was selected to the all-star team. All told, he won 117 games, losing 81, during his nine-year career (1948–1950; 1953–1958).

He appeared in two MLB games with the Pirates in 1956, both in relief — pitching one inning against the Philadelphia Phillies in May and three innings against the Brooklyn Dodgers in September after spending most of the season with Hollywood. In those four innings, he surrendered three hits (including a home run to Brooklyn's Gil Hodges) and one earned run, striking out three and issuing three bases on balls. he died in Redwood City on June 7 1999 of lung cancer at age 70
