= 1956 Brooklyn Dodgers season =

1956 Brooklyn Dodgers
- National League champions
- League: National League
- Ballpark: Ebbets Field; Roosevelt Stadium
- City: Brooklyn, New York; Jersey City, New Jersey
- Record: 93–61 (.604)
- League place: 1st
- Owners: Walter O'Malley, James & Dearie Mulvey, Mary Louise Smith
- President: Walter O'Malley
- General managers: Buzzie Bavasi
- Managers: Walter Alston
- Television: WOR-TV
- Radio: WMGM; Vin Scully, Connie Desmond, Jerry Doggett, Al Helfer; WHOM; Buck Canel

The 1956 Brooklyn Dodgers season was the 67th season for the Brooklyn Dodgers franchise in the MLB. The Dodgers edged out the Milwaukee Braves to win the National League title. The Dodgers again faced the New York Yankees in the World Series. This time they lost the series in seven games, one of which was a perfect game by the Yankees' Don Larsen.

== Offseason ==
- December 9, 1955: Don Hoak, Russ Meyer and Walt Moryn were traded by the Dodgers to the Chicago Cubs for Randy Jackson and Don Elston.
- December 21, 1955: Jack Littrell was purchased by the Dodgers from the Kansas City Athletics.
- December 30, 1955: Pete Wojey was traded by the Dodgers to the Detroit Tigers for Leo Cristante and cash.
- March 2, 1956: Tommy Lasorda was purchased from the Dodgers by the Kansas City Athletics

== Regular season ==
Don Newcombe won the NL MVP award and the first Cy Young Award. He was the first pitcher to win the National League MVP and the Cy Young Award in the same season.

During the season, the Dodgers played seven home games at Roosevelt Stadium in Jersey City, New Jersey, as part of owner Walter O'Malley's continued attempts to pressure Brooklyn to allow him to build a new stadium in his preferred location at Flatbush and Atlantic Avenues. The first of these games was on April 19.

=== Season standings ===
National League
Team	W	L	Pct.	GB	Home	Road
Brooklyn Dodgers	93	61	.604	—	52‍–‍25	41‍–‍36
Milwaukee Braves	92	62	.597	1	47‍–‍29	45‍–‍33
Cincinnati Redlegs	91	63	.591	2	51‍–‍26	40‍–‍37
St. Louis Cardinals	76	78	.494	17	43‍–‍34	33‍–‍44
Philadelphia Phillies	71	83	.461	22	40‍–‍37	31‍–‍46
New York Giants	67	87	.435	26	37‍–‍40	30‍–‍47
Pittsburgh Pirates	66	88	.429	27	35‍–‍43	31‍–‍45
Chicago Cubs	60	94	.390	33	39‍–‍38	21‍–‍56

=== Record vs. opponents ===
1956 National League record Sources:
Team	BRO	CHC	CIN	MIL	NYG	PHI	PIT	STL
Brooklyn	—	16–6	11–11	10–12	14–8	13–9	13–9	16–6
Chicago	6–16	—	6–16–1	9–13	7–15	13–9	10–12–1	9–13–1
Cincinnati	11–11	16–6–1	—	9–13	14–8	11–11	17–5	13–9
Milwaukee	12–10	13–9	13–9	—	17–5	10–12	14–8–1	13–9
New York	8–14	15–7	8–14	5–17	—	11–11	13–9	7–15
Philadelphia	9–13	9–13	11–11	12–10	11–11	—	7–15	12–10
Pittsburgh	9–13	12–10–1	5–17	8–14–1	9–13	15–7	—	8–14–1
St. Louis	6–16	13–9–1	9–13	9–13	15–7	10–12	14–8–1	—

=== Opening Day Lineup ===
Opening Day Lineup
#	Name	Position
19	Jim Gilliam	LF
1	Pee Wee Reese	SS
4	Duke Snider	CF
39	Roy Campanella	C
14	Gil Hodges	1B
42	Jackie Robinson	3B
6	Carl Furillo	RF
43	Charlie Neal	2B
36	Don Newcombe	P

=== Notable transactions ===
- April 16, 1956: Tim Thompson was traded by the Dodgers to the Kansas City Athletics for Lee Wheat, Tom Saffell and cash.
- May 14, 1956: Billy Loes was purchased from the Dodgers by the Baltimore Orioles.
- May 15, 1956: Jim Hughes was purchased from the Dodgers by the Chicago Cubs.
- May 15, 1956: Sal Maglie was purchased by the Dodgers from the Cleveland Indians.
- July 4, 1956: Ray Shearer was traded by the Dodgers to the Milwaukee Braves for Jim Frey.
- July 29, 1956: Dale Mitchell was purchased by the Dodgers from the Cleveland Indians.

=== Roster ===
1956 Brooklyn Dodgers
Roster
Pitchers: 46 Don Bessent; 28 Ralph Branca; 40 Roger Craig; 34 Bob Darnell; 53 Don Drysdale; 17 Carl Erskine; 18 Jim Hughes; 32 Sandy Koufax; 41 Clem Labine; 16 Ken Lehman; 30 Billy Loes; 35 Sal Maglie; 36 Don Newcombe; 37 Ed Roebuck; 28,49 Chuck Templeton	Catchers: 39 Roy Campanella; 54 Dixie Howell; 10 Rube Walker; Infielders: 3 Chico Fernández; 19 Jim Gilliam; 14 Gil Hodges; 2 Randy Jackson; 43 Charlie Neal; 8,21 Rocky Nelson; 1 Pee Wee Reese; 42 Jackie Robinson; 23 Don Zimmer	Outfielders: 15 Sandy Amorós; 9 Gino Cimoli; 27 Don Demeter; 6 Carl Furillo; 8 Dale Mitchell; 4 Duke Snider; Other batters: 34 Bob Aspromonte; 38 Dick Williams	Manager: 24 Walter Alston; Coaches: 33 Joe Becker; 22 Billy Herman; 31 Jake Pitler

== Player stats ==
= Indicates team leader

= Indicates league leader

=== Batting ===
==== Starters by position ====
Note: Pos = Position; G = Games played; AB = At bats; H = Hits; Avg. = Batting average; HR = Home runs; RBI = Runs batted in

Pos	Player	G	AB	H	Avg.	HR	RBI
C	Roy Campanella	124	388	85	.219	20	73
1B	Gil Hodges	153	550	146	.265	32	87
2B	Jim Gilliam	153	594	178	.300	6	43
3B	Randy Jackson	101	307	84	.274	8	53
SS	Pee Wee Reese	147	572	147	.257	9	46
LF	Sandy Amorós	114	292	76	.260	16	58
CF	Duke Snider	151	542	158	.292	43	101
RF	Carl Furillo	149	523	151	.289	21	83

==== Other batters ====
Note: G = Games played; AB = At bats; H = Hits; Avg. = Batting average; HR = Home runs; RBI = Runs batted in

Player	G	AB	H	Avg.	HR	RBI
Jackie Robinson	117	357	98	.275	10	43
Rube Walker	54	146	31	.212	3	20
Charlie Neal	62	136	39	.287	2	14
Rocky Nelson	31	96	20	.208	4	15
Chico Fernández	34	66	15	.227	1	9
Gino Cimoli	73	36	4	.111	0	4
Dale Mitchell	19	24	7	.292	0	1
Don Zimmer	17	20	6	.300	0	2
Dixie Howell	7	13	3	.231	0	1
Dick Williams	7	7	2	.286	0	0
Don Demeter	3	3	1	.333	1	1
Bob Aspromonte	1	1	0	.000	0	0

=== Pitching ===
==== Starting pitchers ====
Note: G = Games pitched; IP = Innings pitched; W = Wins; L = Losses; ERA = Earned run average; SO = Strikeouts

Player	G	IP	W	L	ERA	SO
Don Newcombe	38	268.0	27	7	3.06	139
Roger Craig	35	199.0	12	11	3.71	109
Sal Maglie	28	191.0	13	5	2.87	108
Carl Erskine	31	186.1	13	11	4.25	95
Sandy Koufax	16	58.2	2	4	4.91	30
Billy Loes	1	1.1	0	1	40.50	2

==== Other pitchers ====
Note: G = Games pitched; IP = Innings pitched; W = Wins; L = Losses; ERA = Earned run average; SO = Strikeouts

Player	G	IP	W	L	ERA	SO
Don Drysdale	25	99.0	5	5	2.64	55
Ken Lehman	25	49.1	2	3	5.66	29
Chuck Templeton	6	16.1	0	1	6.61	8

==== Relief pitchers ====
Note: G = Games pitched; W = Wins; L = Losses; SV = Saves; ERA = Earned run average; SO = Strikeouts

Player	G	W	L	SV	ERA	SO
Clem Labine	62	10	6	19	3.35	75
Don Bessent	38	4	3	9	2.50	52
Ed Roebuck	43	5	4	1	3.93	60
Jim Hughes	5	0	0	0	5.25	8
Ralph Branca	1	0	0	0	0.00	2
Bob Darnell	1	0	0	0	0.00	0

== 1956 World Series ==
=== Game 1 ===
October 3, 1956, at Ebbets Field in Brooklyn, New York

Team	1	2	3	4	5	6	7	8	9	R	H	E
New York (A)	2	0	0	1	0	0	0	0	0	3	9	1
Brooklyn (N)	0	2	3	1	0	0	0	0	x	6	9	0
W: Sal Maglie (1–0) L: Whitey Ford (0–1)
HR: NYY – Mickey Mantle (1), Billy Martin (1) BRO – Jackie Robinson (1), Gil Hodges (1)

=== Game 2 ===
October 5, 1956, at Ebbets Field in Brooklyn, New York

Team	1	2	3	4	5	6	7	8	9	R	H	E
New York (A)	1	5	0	1	0	0	0	0	1	8	12	2
Brooklyn (N)	0	6	1	2	2	0	0	2	x	13	12	0
W: Don Bessent (1–0) L: Tom Morgan (0–1)
HR: NYY – Yogi Berra (1) BRO – Duke Snider (1)

=== Game 3 ===
October 6, 1956, at Yankee Stadium in New York City

Team	1	2	3	4	5	6	7	8	9	R	H	E
Brooklyn (N)	0	1	0	0	0	1	1	0	0	3	8	1
New York (A)	0	1	0	0	0	3	0	1	x	5	8	1
W: Whitey Ford (1–1) L: Roger Craig (0–1)
HR: NYY – Enos Slaughter (1), Billy Martin (2)

=== Game 4 ===
October 7, 1956, at Yankee Stadium in New York City

Team	1	2	3	4	5	6	7	8	9	R	H	E
Brooklyn (N)	0	0	0	1	0	0	0	0	1	2	6	0
New York (A)	1	0	0	2	0	1	2	0	x	6	7	2
W: Tom Sturdivant (1–0) L: Carl Erskine (0–1)
HR: NYY – Mickey Mantle (2), Hank Bauer (1)

=== Game 5 ===
October 8, 1956, at Yankee Stadium in New York City

Team	1	2	3	4	5	6	7	8	9	R	H	E
Brooklyn (N)	0	0	0	0	0	0	0	0	0	0	0	0
New York (A)	0	0	0	1	0	1	0	0	x	2	5	0
W: Don Larsen (1–0) L: Sal Maglie (1–1)
HR: NYY – Mickey Mantle (3)

=== Game 6 ===
October 9, 1956, at Ebbets Field in Brooklyn, New York

Team	1	2	3	4	5	6	7	8	9	10	R	H	E
New York (A)	0	0	0	0	0	0	0	0	0	0	0	7	0
Brooklyn (N)	0	0	0	0	0	0	0	0	0	1	1	4	0
W: Clem Labine (1–0) L: Bob Turley (0–1)

=== Game 7 ===
October 10, 1956, at Ebbets Field in Brooklyn, New York

Team	1	2	3	4	5	6	7	8	9	R	H	E
New York (A)	2	0	2	1	0	0	4	0	0	9	10	0
Brooklyn (N)	0	0	0	0	0	0	0	0	0	0	3	1
W: Johnny Kucks (1–0) L: Don Newcombe (0–1)
HR: NYY – Yogi Berra (2, 3), Elston Howard (1), Bill Skowron (1)

== Awards and honors ==
- National League Most Valuable Player
  - Don Newcombe
- Cy Young Award
  - Don Newcombe
- TSN Pitcher of the Year Award
  - Don Newcombe

=== All-Stars ===
- 1956 Major League Baseball All-Star Game
  - Roy Campanella reserve
  - Jim Gilliam reserve
  - Clem Labine reserve
  - Duke Snider reserve
- TSN Major League All-Star Team
  - Don Newcombe

== Farm system ==
Level	Team	League	Manager
Open	Portland Beavers	Pacific Coast League	Tommy Holmes; Bill Sweeney
AAA	Montreal Royals	International League	Greg Mulleavy
AAA	St. Paul Saints	American Association	Max Macon
AA	Ft. Worth Cats	Texas League	Lee Handley
A	Macon Dodgers	South Atlantic League	Goldie Holt
A	Pueblo Dodgers	Western League	Ray Hathaway
B	Cedar Rapids Raiders	Illinois–Indiana–Iowa League	George Scherger
B	Wichita Falls Spudders	Big State League	Jack Wilkinson; Jodie Beeler
C	Great Falls Electrics	Pioneer League	Lou Rochelli
C	Reno Silver Sox	California League	Ray Perry
D	Hornell Dodgers	Pennsylvania–Ontario–New York League	Boyd Bartley; Charlie Gelbert
D	Kokomo Dodgers	Midwest League	Pete Reiser
D	Shawnee Hawks	Sooner State League	Jack Banta
D	Thomasville Dodgers	Georgia–Florida League	Rudy Rufer; George Pfister
