= 1956 Cincinnati Redlegs season =

1956 Cincinnati Redlegs
- League: National League
- Ballpark: Crosley Field
- City: Cincinnati
- Owners: Powel Crosley Jr.
- General managers: Gabe Paul
- Managers: Birdie Tebbetts
- Television: WLWT (Mark Scott, George Bryson)
- Radio: WSAI (Waite Hoyt, Jack Moran)

The 1956 Cincinnati Redlegs season consisted of the Redlegs finishing in third place in the National League with a record of 91–63, two games behind the NL Champion Brooklyn Dodgers. The Redlegs were managed by Birdie Tebbetts and played their home games at Crosley Field, where they drew 1,125,928 fans, third-most in their league.

== Offseason ==
- November 28, 1955: Hobie Landrith was traded by the Redlegs to the Chicago Cubs for Hal Jeffcoat.
- January 31, 1956: Jackie Collum was traded by the Redlegs to the St. Louis Cardinals for Brooks Lawrence and Sonny Senerchia.
- Prior to 1956 season: Joe Azcue was signed as an amateur free agent by the Redlegs.

== Regular season ==
The Redlegs were in first place at mid-season and stayed in the pennant race until the last day of the season, ending up with a 91–63 record, two games behind the Brooklyn Dodgers. For his efforts, the Baseball Writers' Association of America voted Birdie Tebbetts as the 1956 Manager of the Year.

The 1956 Redlegs tied the National League and MLB record for home runs in a season, hitting 221 over 155 regular-season games. (The 1947 Giants also slugged 221 in 155 games played.) Three Redlegs hit more than 35 homers, with Frank Robinson (38) establishing a record for rookies; Wally Post (36) and Ted Kluszewski (35) were the others. Gus Bell (29) and Ed Bailey (28) came within reach of the 30-home-run mark, Bailey in only 383 at bats. The mark stood until 1961, when the New York Yankees hit 240 homers in the first year of the modern 162-game schedule.

On Sunday, June 24, following a doubleheader sweep of the Brooklyn Dodgers, eleven Redlegs players appeared on the panel quiz show What's My Line?.

=== Season standings ===
National League
Team	W	L	Pct.	GB	Home	Road
Brooklyn Dodgers	93	61	.604	—	52‍–‍25	41‍–‍36
Milwaukee Braves	92	62	.597	1	47‍–‍29	45‍–‍33
Cincinnati Redlegs	91	63	.591	2	51‍–‍26	40‍–‍37
St. Louis Cardinals	76	78	.494	17	43‍–‍34	33‍–‍44
Philadelphia Phillies	71	83	.461	22	40‍–‍37	31‍–‍46
New York Giants	67	87	.435	26	37‍–‍40	30‍–‍47
Pittsburgh Pirates	66	88	.429	27	35‍–‍43	31‍–‍45
Chicago Cubs	60	94	.390	33	39‍–‍38	21‍–‍56

=== Record vs. opponents ===
1956 National League record Sources:
Team	BRO	CHC	CIN	MIL	NYG	PHI	PIT	STL
Brooklyn	—	16–6	11–11	10–12	14–8	13–9	13–9	16–6
Chicago	6–16	—	6–16–1	9–13	7–15	13–9	10–12–1	9–13–1
Cincinnati	11–11	16–6–1	—	9–13	14–8	11–11	17–5	13–9
Milwaukee	12–10	13–9	13–9	—	17–5	10–12	14–8–1	13–9
New York	8–14	15–7	8–14	5–17	—	11–11	13–9	7–15
Philadelphia	9–13	9–13	11–11	12–10	11–11	—	7–15	12–10
Pittsburgh	9–13	12–10–1	5–17	8–14–1	9–13	15–7	—	8–14–1
St. Louis	6–16	13–9–1	9–13	9–13	15–7	10–12	14–8–1	—

=== Notable transactions ===
- April 1, 1956: Jim Pearce was assigned by the Redlegs to the St. Louis Cardinals.

=== Roster ===
1956 Cincinnati Redlegs
Roster
Pitchers: 40 Tom Acker; 49 Joe Black; 51 Art Fowler; 30 Hersh Freeman; 31 Don Gross; 43 Larry Jansen; 42 Hal Jeffcoat; 43 Bill Kennedy; 35 Johnny Klippstein; 38 Paul LaPalme; 46 Brooks Lawrence; 34 Russ Meyer; 39 Joe Nuxhall; 48 Pat Scantlebury; 32 Frank Smith	Catchers: 6 Ed Bailey; 7 Smoky Burgess; 9 Bruce Edwards; Infielders: 14 Rocky Bridges; 15 George Crowe; 26 Jim Dyck; 10 Alex Grammas; 12 Ray Jablonski; 18 Ted Kluszewski; 11 Roy McMillan; 16 Johnny Temple	Outfielders: 24 Bobby Balcena; 25 Gus Bell; 9 Joe Frazier; 10 Chuck Harmon; 23 Stan Palys; 28 Wally Post; 20 Frank Robinson; 37 Art Schult; 22 Bob Thurman; Other batters: 9 Matt Batts; 27 Curt Flood; 36 John Oldham; 27 Al Silvera	Manager: 1 Birdie Tebbetts; Coaches: 4 Jimmy Dykes; 3 Tom Ferrick; 2 Frank McCormick

== Player stats ==
=== Batting ===
==== Starters by position ====
Note: Pos = Position; G = Games played; AB = At bats; H = Hits; Avg. = Batting average; HR = Home runs; RBI = Runs batted in

Pos	Player	G	AB	H	Avg.	HR	RBI
C	Ed Bailey	118	383	115	.300	28	75
1B	Ted Kluszewski	138	517	156	.302	35	102
2B	Johnny Temple	154	632	180	.285	2	41
SS	Roy McMillan	150	479	126	.263	3	62
3B	Ray Jablonski	130	407	104	.256	15	66
LF	Frank Robinson	152	572	166	.290	38	83
CF	Gus Bell	150	603	176	.292	29	84
RF	Wally Post	143	539	134	.249	36	83

==== Other batters ====
Note: G = Games played; AB = At bats; H = Hits; Avg. = Batting average; HR = Home runs; RBI = Runs batted in

Player	G	AB	H	Avg.	HR	RBI
Smokey Burgess	90	229	63	.275	12	39
George Crowe	77	144	36	.250	10	23
Alex Grammas	77	140	34	.243	0	16
Bob Thurman	80	139	41	.295	8	22
Stan Palys	40	53	12	.226	2	5
Rocky Bridges	71	19	4	.211	0	1
Joe Frazier	10	17	4	.235	1	2
Jim Dyck	18	11	1	.091	0	0
Art Schult	5	7	3	.429	0	2
Bruce Edwards	7	5	1	.200	0	0
Chuck Harmon	13	4	0	.000	0	0
Matt Batts	3	2	0	.000	0	0
Bobby Balcena	7	2	0	.000	0	0
Curt Flood	5	1	0	.000	0	0
Al Silvera	1	0	0	----	0	0
John Oldham	1	0	0	----	0	0

=== Pitching ===
==== Starting pitchers ====
Note: G = Games pitched; IP = Innings pitched; W = Wins; L = Losses; ERA = Earned run average; SO = Strikeouts

Player	G	IP	W	L	ERA	SO
Johnny Klippstein	37	211.0	12	11	4.09	86
Joe Nuxhall	44	200.2	13	11	3.72	120
Larry Jansen	8	34.2	2	3	5.19	16

==== Other pitchers ====
Note: G = Games pitched; IP = Innings pitched; W = Wins; L = Losses; ERA = Earned run average; SO = Strikeouts

Player	G	IP	W	L	ERA	SO
Brooks Lawrence	49	218.2	19	10	3.99	96
Art Fowler	45	177.2	11	11	4.05	86
Hal Jeffcoat	38	171.0	8	2	3.84	55
Tom Acker	29	83.2	4	3	2.37	54
Don Gross	19	69.1	3	0	1.95	47
Paul LaPalme	11	27.0	2	4	4.67	4
Pat Scantlebury	6	19.0	0	1	6.63	10

==== Relief pitchers ====
Note: G = Games pitched; W = Wins; L = Losses; SV = Saves; ERA = Earned run average; SO = Strikeouts

Player	G	W	L	SV	ERA	SO
Hersh Freeman	64	14	5	17	3.40	17
Joe Black	32	3	2	2	4.52	27
Frank Smith	2	0	0	0	12.00	1
Bill Kennedy	1	0	0	0	18.00	0
Russ Meyer	1	0	0	0	0.00	1

== Awards and honors ==
All-Star Game

- Ted Kluszewski
- Gus Bell

== Farm system ==
Level	Team	League	Manager
Open	Seattle Rainiers	Pacific Coast League	Luke Sewell and Bill Brenner
AAA	Havana Sugar Kings	International League	Reggie Otero and Nap Reyes
AA	Nashville Vols	Southern Association	Ernie White
A	Savannah Redlegs	Sally League	Jimmy Brown
B	High Point-Thomasville Hi-Toms	Carolina League	Bert Haas
B	Clovis Pioneers	Southwestern League	Frank Benites, Glenn McQuillen and Roy Parker
C	Yuma Sun Sox	Arizona–Mexico League	Whitey Wietelmann and Bill Harris
C	Wausau Lumberjacks	Northern League	John Streza
D	West Palm Beach Sun Chiefs	Florida State League	Walt Novick
D	Douglas Reds	Georgia State League	Johnny Vander Meer
D	Moultrie Reds	Georgia–Florida League	Bob Wellman

LEAGUE CHAMPIONS: Douglas
