= Bob Blaylock =

American baseball player (1935–2024)

- Pitcher
- Born: June 28, 1935; Chattanooga, Tennessee, U.S.
- Died: September 1, 2024 (aged 89); Collinsville, Oklahoma, U.S.
- Batted: Right Threw: Right

MLB debut
- July 22, 1956, for the St. Louis Cardinals

Last MLB appearance
- September 20, 1959, for the St. Louis Cardinals

MLB statistics
- Win–loss record: 1–7
- Earned run average: 5.94
- Strikeouts: 42
- Stats at Baseball Reference

Teams
- St. Louis Cardinals (1956; 1959)

Robert Edward Blaylock (June 28, 1935 – September 1, 2024) was an American professional baseball player, a right-handed pitcher who played parts of two Major League Baseball seasons for the 1956 and 1959 St. Louis Cardinals. Blaylock batted right-handed, stood 6 feet 1 inch (1.85 m) tall and weighed 185 pounds (84 kg).

Blaylock spent his entire, ten-year professional career in the Cardinals organization after signing with the club following his Muldrow, Oklahoma, high school graduation. A hard thrower who led the 1958 American Association in strikeouts, Blaylock lost two fingers on his left (non-pitching) hand after a farm accident in his youth.

His first trial with the Cardinals came in 1956 after a hot start (nine wins, four losses and an earned run average of 1.67) with the Rochester Red Wings of the International League. On July 22, he made his Major League debut as a starting pitcher against the Brooklyn Dodgers at Busch Stadium; he pitched five shutout innings against the defending world champions, but tired thereafter and surrendered five runs (including home runs by Rube Walker and Duke Snider) in 7 2/3 innings in a 5–3 defeat. Wildness plagued Blaylock in his next start four days later against the Philadelphia Phillies, as he issued seven bases on balls in four innings pitched and was lifted with none out in the fifth frame. All told, Blaylock appeared in 14 games and 41 innings as a rookie; while he struck out 39 batters, he walked 24 and gave up 45 hits. He dropped six of his seven decisions, with an earned run average of 6.37.

Blaylock spent the next three seasons in minor league baseball before he was recalled in September 1959. Blaylock appeared in three games, all against the Chicago Cubs, one as a starter. He was more effective than in 1956, but lost his only decision. As a Major Leaguer, he appeared in 17 games and 50 innings, and yielded 53 hits and 27 bases on balls, with 42 strikeouts. His minor league career ended after the 1962 season, his fourth consecutive season with the Redbirds' Double-A Tulsa Oilers affiliate in Blaylock's home state of Oklahoma.

Blaylock was one of three unrelated men with the same surname who played in the National League during the 1950s. Marv Blaylock was a first baseman, mostly for the Phillies, who walked twice and grounded out against Bob Blaylock in his July 26, 1956, start. Gary Blaylock was also a right-handed pitcher for the Cardinals and an occasional teammate of Bob's.

Blaylock died in Collinsville, Oklahoma, on September 1, 2024, at the age of 89.
