= Ray Crone =

American baseball player (1931–2026)

- Pitcher
- Born: August 7, 1931; Memphis, Tennessee, U.S.
- Died: January 15, 2026 (aged 94); Waxahachie, Texas, U.S.
- Batted: Right Threw: Right

MLB debut
- April 13, 1954, for the Milwaukee Braves

Last MLB appearance
- July 14, 1958, for the San Francisco Giants

MLB statistics
- Win–loss record: 30–30
- Earned run average: 3.87
- Strikeouts: 260
- Stats at Baseball Reference

Teams
- Milwaukee Braves (1954–1957); New York / San Francisco Giants (1957–1958)

Raymond Hayes Crone (August 7, 1931 – January 15, 2026) was an American professional baseball player and scout. In his playing days, he was a right-handed pitcher who played in Major League Baseball for the Milwaukee Braves from 1954 to 1957 and the New York / San Francisco Giants in 1957 and 1958. The native of Memphis, Tennessee, was listed as 6 feet 2 inches (1.88 m) tall and 165 pounds (75 kg).

== Early life ==
Prior to playing professionally, Crone attended Memphis, Christian Brothers High School. He signed a professional contract with the Boston Braves in 1949 at the age of 17 and began his career that season. He was used primarily as a starting pitcher in his early minor league career, reaching win totals as high as 19, accomplishing that with the 1953 Jacksonville Braves. That year, the Braves franchise was transferred to become the Milwaukee Braves.

== Major league career ==
Crone made his major league debut on April 13, 1954, at age 22. He spent 19 games with the big league club, starting two of them and going 1–0 with a 2.02 ERA in 49 innings of work. Of all pitchers on the team that season, he had the second-lowest ERA (trailing only Charlie Gorin's 1.86). He also spent 14 games in the minor leagues that season.

With the Braves in 1955, Crone went 10–9 with a 3.46 ERA in 33 games (15 starts). In 1401/3 innings pitched, he allowed only 117 hits. Though he spent time in the minors in 1955, it was a short stint – only four games.

He went 11–10 with a 3.87 ERA in 35 games in 1956. Crone began the 1957 season with the Braves, going 3–1 with a 4.46 ERA in 11 games (five starts). On June 15, he was traded with Danny O'Connell and Bobby Thomson to the New York Giants for Baseball Hall of Fame second baseman Red Schoendienst. He went 4–8 with a 4.33 ERA with the Giants that year, and went a combined 7–9 with a 4.36 ERA.

Crone played his final major league season in 1958, going 1–2 with a 6.75 ERA in 14 games (one start). On July 15 of that year, he was traded to the Toronto Maple Leafs for Don Johnson. He finished the season in the minor leagues, playing his final big league game on July 14. Crone pitched in the minors until 1961, when he was 29 years old. In each of the final three seasons of his minor league career, Crone did not post a winning percentage over .444.

== Career totals ==
Over the course of his five-year major league career, Crone went 30–30 with a 3.87 ERA in 137 games (61 starts). In 546 innings pitched, he struck out 260 batters and walked 173. He allowed 554 hits.

He spent 11 seasons in the minors, going 90–77 in 244 games. Although a .115 hitter (18-for-156) with just 5 RBI in his major league career, he fielded his position well, posting a .993 fielding percentage, committing only one error in 134 total chances.

== Longtime scout ==
A decade after retiring from the mound, Crone became a scout, based in Texas and working for the Montreal Expos, Baltimore Orioles, San Diego Padres, and the Arizona Diamondbacks. His son, Ray Jr., also worked as a scout for the Detroit Tigers, the Orioles, and Boston Red Sox.

== Death ==
Crone died on January 15, 2026, at the age of 94.
