= Danny Kravitz =

American baseball player (1930–2013)

- Catcher
- Born: December 21, 1930; Lopez, Pennsylvania, U.S.
- Died: June 19, 2013 (aged 82); Danville, Pennsylvania, U.S.
- Batted: Left Threw: Right

MLB debut
- April 17, 1956, for the Pittsburgh Pirates

Last MLB appearance
- September 18, 1960, for the Kansas City Athletics

MLB statistics
- Batting average: .236
- Home runs: 10
- Runs batted in: 54
- Stats at Baseball Reference

Teams
- Pittsburgh Pirates (1956–1960); Kansas City Athletics (1960)

Daniel Kravitz (December 21, 1930 – June 19, 2013) was an American professional baseball player. He was a catcher in Major League Baseball from 1956 to 1960 for the Pittsburgh Pirates and Kansas City Athletics. Kravitz batted left-handed, threw right-handed, stood 5 feet 11 inches (1.80 m) tall and weighed 195 pounds (88 kg).

Born in Lopez, Pennsylvania, to Eva (Hubiak) and John Kravitz, Danny Kravitz was a reserve catcher for the Pirates from 1956 through 1959, and he also began the 1960 season with the Bucs, but was traded to the Athletics on June 1, 1960, for Hank Foiles and therefore was not with the Pirates during the 1960 World Series. With the Athletics the remainder of the season, Kravitz was part of a catching platoon with Pete Daley and received the most playing time of his career, batting .234 with 4 home runs and 14 runs batted in in 175 at-bats. After the 1960 season, his contract was sold to the Cincinnati Reds. However, he never again played in the major leagues. Kravitz played three more seasons in the minor leagues before retiring.

His first major league home run occurred on May 11, 1956, in the bottom of the ninth inning with the bases loaded and the Pirates trailing the Philadelphia Phillies 5-2. Kravitz' walk-off grand slam gave the Pirates a 6–5 win. His MLB totals included 130 hits, with 22 doubles, seven triples, ten home runs and 54 runs batted in. He hit .236 lifetime in 215 games played.

He died on June 19, 2013.

== See also ==
- List of Major League Baseball ultimate grand slams
