= Turk Lown =

American baseball player (1924–2016)

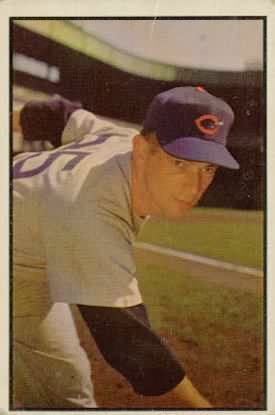
- Lown c. 1953
- Pitcher
- Born: May 30, 1924; Brooklyn, New York, U.S.
- Died: July 8, 2016 (aged 92); Pueblo, Colorado, U.S.
- Batted: Right Threw: Right

MLB debut
- April 24, 1951, for the Chicago Cubs

Last MLB appearance
- September 22, 1962, for the Chicago White Sox

MLB statistics
- Win–loss record: 55–61
- Earned run average: 4.12
- Strikeouts: 574
- Saves: 73
- Stats at Baseball Reference

Teams
- Chicago Cubs (1951–1954, 1956–1958); Cincinnati Redlegs (1958); Chicago White Sox (1958–1962)

Omar Joseph "Turk" Lown (May 30, 1924 – July 8, 2016) was an American professional baseball player. He was a right-handed pitcher over parts of 11 seasons (1951–54, 1956–62) with the Chicago Cubs, Cincinnati Reds and Chicago White Sox. The 6 ft (1.83 m), 180 lb (82 kg) Lown received his nickname as a child because of his fondness for eating turkey.

A native of Brooklyn, New York, Lown was signed as an amateur free agent by the Brooklyn Dodgers and entered their farm system in 1942. He attended and graduated from Brooklyn Technical High School. His baseball career was interrupted by World War II, serving in the US Army as an infantryman seeing action in the Battle of the Bulge and receiving the Purple Heart. Following his military service, he returned to minor league baseball with the Dodgers from 1946 to 1950. In November 1950, he was selected by the Chicago Cubs in the Rule 5 draft making his major league debut on April 24, 1951.

For his career, Lown compiled a 55–61 record in 504 appearances, mostly as a relief pitcher, with a 4.12 earned run average, 73 saves and 574 strikeouts. In 1959, he led the American League in saves and games finished to help lead the White Sox to the pennant. Lown did not give up a run in three appearances in the 1959 World Series loss to the Los Angeles Dodgers. He also led the National League in successive seasons (1956–57) in games finished, while topping the NL in games pitched (67) in 1957.

Lown celebrated his 90th birthday with Violet, his wife of 65 years, their three sons, four grandchildren, four great-grandchildren, and many close friends, on Memorial Day 2014, in Pueblo, Colorado, where he played minor league baseball and in 1947 met Violet Krizman, who "became his best friend for life." They returned to Pueblo, where he worked as a mail carrier for 23 years, after he retired from professional baseball.

Lown died on July 8, 2016, of leukemia.

== See also ==
- List of Major League Baseball annual saves leaders
