= Cholly Naranjo =

Cuban baseball player (1934–2022)

- Pitcher
- Born: November 25, 1934; Havana, Cuba
- Died: January 13, 2022 (aged 87); Miami, Florida, U.S.
- Batted: Left Threw: Right

MLB debut
- July 8, 1956, for the Pittsburgh Pirates

Last MLB appearance
- September 12, 1956, for the Pittsburgh Pirates

MLB statistics
- Win–loss record: 1–2
- Earned run average: 4.46
- Strikeouts: 26
- Stats at Baseball Reference

Teams
- Pittsburgh Pirates (1956)

Lázaro Ramón Gonzalo Naranjo [nah-RAHN-ho] (25 November 1934 – 13 January 2022) was a Cuban professional baseball player who was a pitcher in Major League Baseball. Listed at 5 ft 11 1/2 in (1.82 m), 165 lb (75 kg), he batted left-handed and threw right-handed.

== Biography ==
A native of Havana, Cuba, Naranjo was signed in 1952 by the Washington Senators, but he did not play for them. Drafted by the Pittsburgh Pirates in 1954, he entered the majors in 1956 with the Pirates, appearing for them in 17 games.

In his one-season career, Naranjo posted a 1–2 record with 26 strikeouts and a 4.46 ERA in 34 1/3 innings of work, including three starts and seven games finished. As a hitter, he went 1-for-7 for a .143 average, including one double, one run, and one RBI.

Naranjo died from complications of COVID-19 in Miami, on 13 January 2022, at the age of 87.

== See also ==
- List of Major League Baseball players from Cuba
