= Bobby Thomson =

American baseball player (1923–2010)

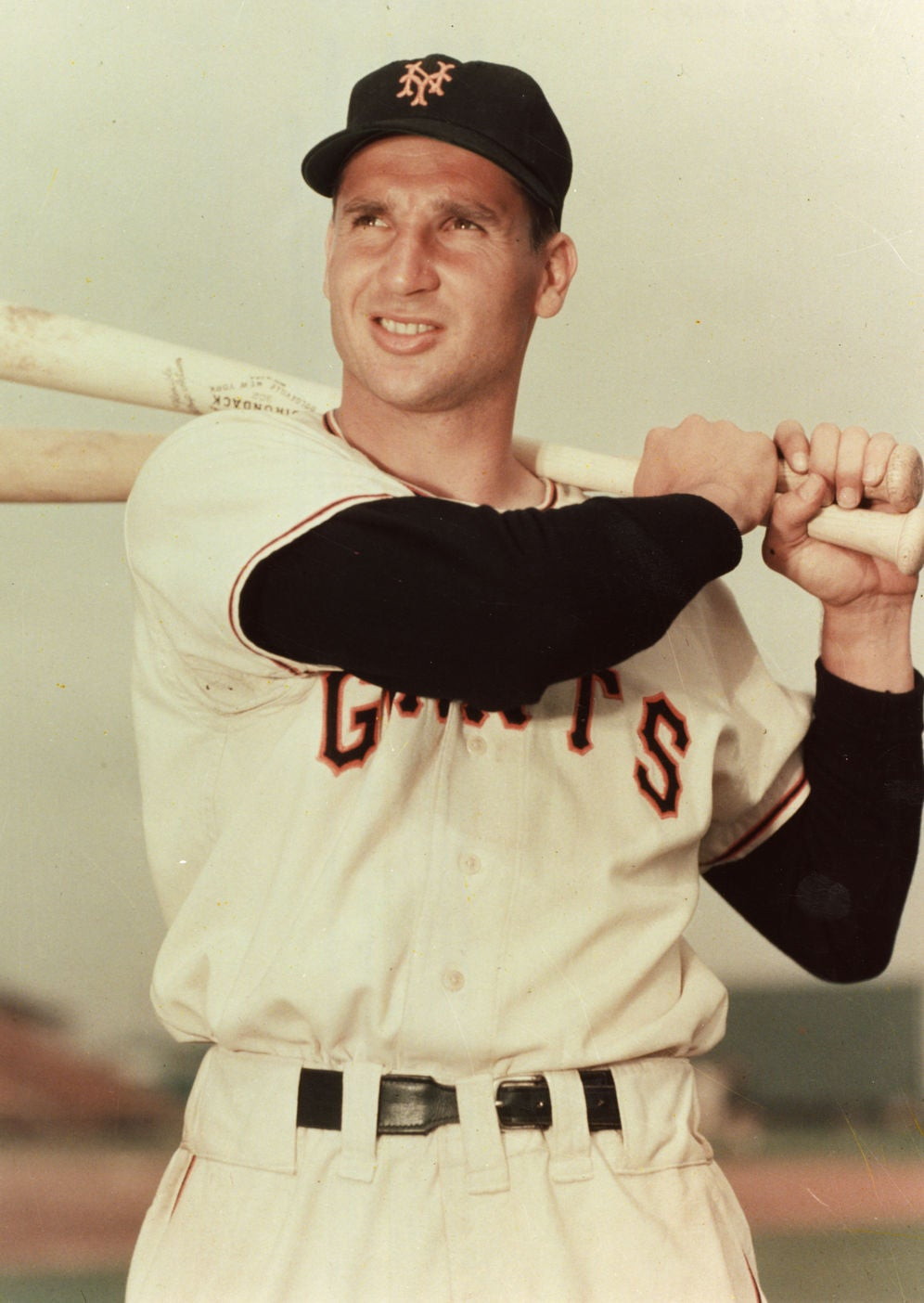
- Thomson with the New York Giants in 1950
- Outfielder
- Born: October 25, 1923; Glasgow, Scotland, United Kingdom
- Died: August 16, 2010 (aged 86); Skidaway Island, Georgia, U.S.
- Batted: Right Threw: Right

MLB debut
- September 9, 1946, for the New York Giants

Last MLB appearance
- July 17, 1960, for the Baltimore Orioles

MLB statistics
- Batting average: .270
- Home runs: 264
- Runs batted in: 1,026
- Stats at Baseball Reference

Teams
- New York Giants (1946–1953); Milwaukee Braves (1954–1957); New York Giants (1957); Chicago Cubs (1958–1959); Boston Red Sox (1960); Baltimore Orioles (1960)

Career highlights and awards
- 3× All-Star (1948, 1949, 1952)

Robert Brown Thomson (October 25, 1923 – August 16, 2010) was an American professional baseball player, nicknamed "the Staten Island Scot". He was an outfielder and right-handed batter for the New York Giants (1946–53, 1957), Milwaukee Braves (1954–57), Chicago Cubs (1958–59), Boston Red Sox (1960), and Baltimore Orioles (1960). His pennant-winning three-run home run for the Giants in 1951 is popularly known as the "Shot Heard 'Round the World", and is one of the most famous moments in baseball history. It overshadowed his other accomplishments, including eight 20-home-run seasons and three All-Star selections. "It was the best thing that ever happened to me", he said. "It may have been the best thing that ever happened to anybody."

== Early life ==
Thomson was born in the Townhead area of Glasgow, Scotland, United Kingdom. He was the youngest of six children born to parents James and Elizabeth. He arrived in the United States two years later. James, a cabinet maker, had moved to New York City shortly before Bobby's birth and sent for his family in 1925.

Thomson grew up on Staten Island in New York City and signed with the New York Giants for a $100 bonus right out of Curtis High School in 1942. On December 5, 1942, he joined the United States Army Air Forces and trained as a bombardier. His entire service was within the continental United States. He played semiprofessional baseball in the summer of 1945 while awaiting his discharge.

== Early baseball career ==
Thomson batted .283 with 29 home runs and 82 runs batted in (RBIs) in his rookie year, 1947. The following season, he batted .248 with 16 home runs. In 1949, Thomson had career bests in RBIs (109) and batting average (.309). His batting average dropped to .252 in 1950. He then hit a career-high 32 home runs in 1951, the fifth-best total in the major leagues; he also had the fourth-highest slugging average in baseball that year.

== The "Shot Heard 'Round the World" ==
Thomson hits the Shot Heard 'Round the World

Thomson became a celebrity for his walk-off home run off Brooklyn Dodgers pitcher Ralph Branca to win the 1951 National League pennant. The home run, nicknamed the "Shot Heard 'Round the World", was dramatic as, until 1969, league pennants were only decided by a playoff when the teams involved finished the regular season in a tie. Prior to 1951, playoffs had only been necessary in 1946 (NL) and 1948 (AL).

Although in mid-August, the Giants were 13 1/2 games behind the league-leading Dodgers, they won 37 of their final 44 games to tie Brooklyn on the final day of the regular season, forcing a three-game playoff. The Giants won the first game 3–1 as a result of a two-run home run by Thomson (off Branca). Brooklyn's Clem Labine shut out the Giants in the second game, 10–0. The decisive contest, played on October 3 at the Polo Grounds, was the first major sporting event televised coast-to-coast in the United States. The Dodgers took a 4–1 lead into the bottom of the ninth inning, but Giants shortstop Alvin Dark singled, advanced to third on a single by Don Mueller, and scored on a double by Whitey Lockman. With Lockman on second and pinch runner Clint Hartung at third, Thomson's walk-off home run turned looming defeat into a 5–4 victory. The moment was immortalized by Giants play-by-play announcer Russ Hodges's excited multiple repetitions: "The Giants win the pennant! The Giants win the pennant!"

Waiting in the on-deck circle to hit behind Thomson was rookie Willie Mays. The Giants' season ended, however, at the 1951 World Series; the Yankees swept the last three games to win the best-of-seven series, four games to two. Thomson went 5 for 21, batting .238 in the series with no home runs.

The bat from the "Shot Heard 'Round the World" is in the collection of the National Baseball Hall of Fame and Museum in Cooperstown, New York, as are the glove and the spikes Thomson used at the game, though the home-run ball he hit has never been definitively identified. The uniform worn by Thomson on that day is apparently a part of a large private collection owned by Dan Scheinman, a member of the San Francisco Giants ownership group.

=== Sign stealing ===
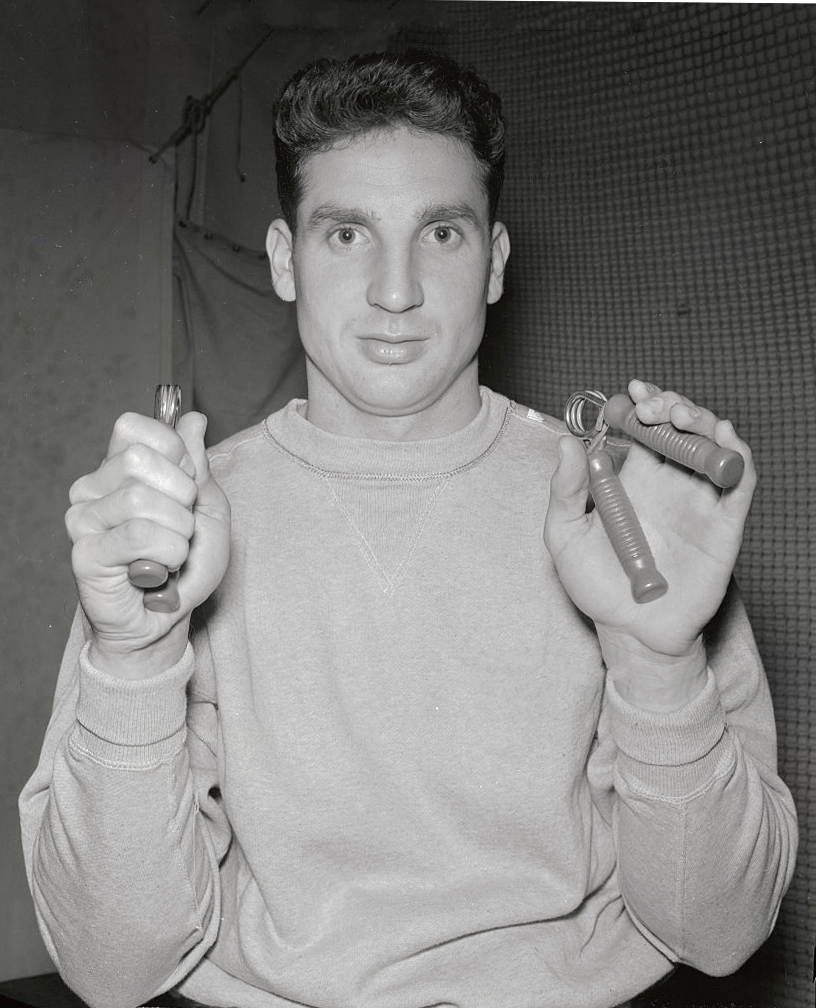
Thomson training his hands in the off-season, 1949

Longstanding rumors that the Giants engaged in systematic sign stealing during the second half of the 1951 season were confirmed in 2001. Several players told The Wall Street Journal that beginning on July 20, coach Herman Franks used a telescope positioned in the Giants clubhouse behind center field to steal the finger signals of opposing catchers. Stolen signs were relayed to the Giants dugout via a buzzer wire. Joshua Prager, the author of the Journal article, outlined the evidence in greater detail in a 2008 book.

Although Thomson always insisted that he had no foreknowledge of Branca's pitch, Sal Yvars told Prager that he relayed Rube Walker's fastball sign to Thomson, though Thomson said that he was too focused on the at-bat to pay attention to the signal. Branca was privately skeptical of Thomson's denials, but made no public comment at the time. Later, he told The New York Times, "I didn't want to diminish a legendary moment in baseball. And even if Bobby knew what was coming, he had to hit it.... Knowing the pitch doesn't always help." Whether the telescope-and-buzzer system contributed significantly to the Giants' late-season 37–7 win streak remains a subject of debate. Prager notes in his book that sign stealing was not specifically forbidden by MLB rules at the time and, moral issues aside, "...has been a part of baseball since its inception". Sign stealing using optical or other mechanical aids was outlawed by MLB in 1961.

== Later years ==
In 1952, Thomson led the National League with 14 triples while batting .271 with 25 home runs and 109 RBIs for the Giants. In his final season with the Giants in 1953, Thomson hit 26 home runs and 106 RBIs, and a .288 average. That winter, he was sent to the Milwaukee Braves in a multiplayer deal. During his first spring training with the Braves in 1954, he suffered a broken ankle, which allowed rookie Hank Aaron to earn a place in the Milwaukee lineup. Thomson batted a career-low .232 in 1954.

The Braves traded Thomson back to the Giants during the 1957 season, and he was in the lineup for the club's final game at the Polo Grounds. The Giants moved to San Francisco for the 1958 season, but Thomson was gone, traded to the Cubs. He spent two seasons in Chicago before closing out his major-league career in the American League with the Red Sox and Orioles. He played one final season in 1963 with the Yomiuri Giants in Japan.

Thomson was a career .270 hitter with 264 home runs and 1,026 RBIs in 1,779 games. He was selected an All-Star in 1948, 1949, and 1952.

In the 1990s, over 40 years after his famous home run, Thomson received a letter from a Marine who had been stationed in Korea in 1951:

"I was in a bunker in the front line with my buddy listening to the radio. It was contrary to orders, but he was a Giants fanatic. He never made it home, and I promised him if I ever got back, I'd write and tell you about the happiest moment of his life. It's taken me this long to put my feelings into words. On behalf of my buddy, thanks, Bobby."

After baseball, Thomson became a sales executive at a New York City paper-products company. He lived in Watchung, New Jersey, until 2006, when he moved to Savannah, Georgia, to be near his daughter Nancy and his grandchildren. He died August 16, 2010, at his home in The Marshes of Skidaway Island, a continuing care facility in Savannah.

== Honors ==
Scottish baseball team Edinburgh Diamond Devils named their home Bobby Thomson Field. It was opened by Thomson himself in 2003, while he was in Scotland to be inducted into the Scottish Sports Hall of Fame.

The UK Chapter of The Society for American Baseball Research is named the Bobby Thomson Chapter.

The field at his alma mater, Curtis High School in Staten Island, was renamed Bobby Thomson Baseball Field in 2007. Thomson was inducted into the Staten Island Sports Hall of Fame in the inaugural class of 1995.

== In popular culture ==
In the prologue to Don Delillo's 1997 novel, Underworld, Thomson's game winning home run is the seminal moment that begins a decades long search for the ball that fell into the outfield stands of the Polo Grounds.

== See also ==
- List of Major League Baseball career home run leaders
- List of Major League Baseball career runs batted in leaders
- List of Major League Baseball annual triples leaders
- List of Major League Baseball ultimate grand slams
