= Tex Taylor (baseball) =

Tom "Tex" Taylor (born 1933) is an American former minor league baseball infielder and player-manager.

Taylor played professionally from 1951 to 1958. He spent time in the farm systems of the Pittsburgh Pirates and the Washington Senators. In 1954, Taylor was a first baseman on the Waco Pirates. The 1954 Waco team has been rated number twenty five on the list of the top one hundred teams in the history of Minor League Baseball by the official minor league website. In 1957, while playing for the Wilson Tobs, Taylor got the lone single in Joe Grzenda's one-hitter for the Durham Bulls.

During his playing career, Taylor saw some service as a player-manager including a stint as the skipper of the 1956 Kinston Eagles of the Carolina League. At only twenty three years of age, Taylor still holds the record as the youngest manager in that league's history.

== Sources ==
- Waco team
- The Professional Baseball Players Database 5.0
- Sumner, Jim L. (1994). Separating the Men From the Boys: The First Half-Century of the Carolina League. John F. Blair. ISBN 0-89587-112-2.
