= Dick Rand =

American baseball player (1931–1996)

- Catcher
- Born: March 7, 1931; South Gate, California, U.S.
- Died: January 22, 1996 (aged 64); Moreno Valley, California, U.S.
- Batted: Right Threw: Right

MLB debut
- September 16, 1953, for the St. Louis Cardinals

Last MLB appearance
- September 17, 1957, for the Pittsburgh Pirates

MLB statistics
- Batting average: .240
- Home runs: 2
- Runs batted in: 13
- Stats at Baseball Reference

Teams
- St. Louis Cardinals (1953, 1955); Pittsburgh Pirates (1957)

Richard Hilton Rand (March 7, 1931 – January 22, 1996) was an American professional baseball catcher who appeared in 72 games in Major League Baseball during all or part of three seasons (1953, 1955 and 1957) for the St. Louis Cardinals and Pittsburgh Pirates. Born in South Gate, California, he threw and batted right-handed, stood 6 feet 2 inches (1.88 m) tall and weighed 185 pounds (84 kg).

Rand's pro career stretched over 12 seasons (1949–1959 and 1961). Signed initially by the Cardinals, he had two late-season trials with the Redbirds, collecting 12 hits in 41 at bats (.293) in a dozen games—all of them as the club's starting catcher. St. Louis traded him to Pittsburgh after the 1956 minor-league season, and Rand spent all of 1957 with the Pirates, backing up starting catcher Hank Foiles; he played in 60 contests and started 34 behind the plate. But he batted only .219 and returned to the minors for the rest of his active career.

In the majors, Rand batted .240 lifetime with 35 hits, including three doubles, one triple and two home runs; he had 13 runs batted in.
