= Solly Hemus =

American baseball player and manager (1923–2017)

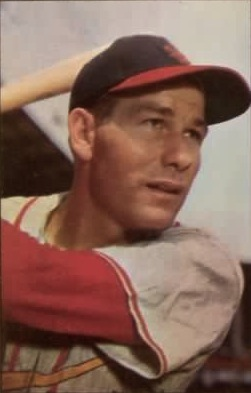
- Hemus in about 1953
- Shortstop / Second baseman / Manager
- Born: April 17, 1923; Phoenix, Arizona, U.S.
- Died: October 2, 2017 (aged 94); Houston, Texas, U.S.
- Batted: Left Threw: Right

MLB debut
- April 27, 1949, for the St. Louis Cardinals

Last MLB appearance
- June 14, 1959, for the St. Louis Cardinals

MLB statistics
- Batting average: .273
- Home runs: 51
- Runs batted in: 263
- Managerial record: 190–192
- Winning %: .497
- Stats at Baseball Reference
- Managerial record at Baseball Reference

Teams
- As player: St. Louis Cardinals (1949–1956); Philadelphia Phillies (1956–1958); St. Louis Cardinals (1959); As manager: St. Louis Cardinals (1959–1961); As coach: New York Mets (1962–1963); Cleveland Indians (1964–1965)

Solomon Joseph Hemus (April 17, 1923 – October 2, 2017) was an American professional baseball infielder, manager, and coach, who played in Major League Baseball (MLB) for the St. Louis Cardinals and Philadelphia Phillies. Hemus is one of a select group of big league players to have held a dual role as a player-manager.

Hemus was born in Phoenix, Arizona, and raised in San Diego, where he graduated from Saint Augustine High School. He served in the United States Navy during World War II, and began his professional playing career in the Cardinals' farm system as a 23-year-old in 1946.

== Baseball career ==
=== Player ===
Hemus batted left-handed and threw right-handed; he stood 5 feet 9 inches (1.75 m) tall, weighing 165 pounds (75 kg). During his 11-year MLB playing career (1949–1959), Hemus was primarily a shortstop (472 games and 3,745 innings played), although he also saw significant time as a second baseman (211 games, 1,6352/3 innings). Hemus compiled a lifetime batting average of .273 in 961 games and collected 736 hits, with 137 doubles, 41 triples, 51 home runs and 263 RBI. He led National League batters in being hit by pitched balls three times (1952, 1953, 1958).

=== Manager and coach ===
Hemus was a hard-nosed player and manager known for battling with opponents and umpires; he was ejected 30 times between 1952 and 1965. When he was traded to the Phillies in May 1956, Hemus wrote a letter to Cardinals owner Gussie Busch, expressing his pride in being a Cardinal and his gratitude to the baseball club. Nearing the end of his playing career, he was reacquired by the Cardinals on September 29, 1958 — one day after the regular season ended — and named St. Louis' player-manager by Busch, who admired Hemus' fiery personality and remembered his letter from 2 1/2 years before. Hemus took over the Cardinals in time to lead them on an October 1958 "good will" tour of Hawaii and Japan.

As a player in 1959, Hemus appeared in 24 games — mostly as a pinch-hitter — before concentrating on his managerial responsibilities. His Cardinals were inconsistent. Hemus' first club lost 15 of its first 20 games and stumbled to a seventh place (71–83) finish in 1959. That was followed by a 15-game improvement (86–68) and a leap to third place in his second season (1960). The Redbirds followed with a mediocre start in 1961 and were mired in sixth place on July 5 (at 33–41), when Hemus was replaced by one of his coaches, Johnny Keane. His career managing record was 190–192 (.497). He was thrown out of 11 of the 382 games he managed, comprising over one-third of his career MLB ejections.

Hemus then served as a coach with the New York Mets (1962–1963) and Cleveland Indians (1964–1965). He was on manager Casey Stengel's coaching staff when the 1962 Mets expansion team ended up with a record of 40–120, still the most losses by a Major League team in a single season since the nineteenth century. He managed the Mets' top farm club, the Jacksonville Suns of the Triple-A International League, in 1966, before leaving baseball and entering the oil business in his adopted home city of Houston, Texas.

During his tenure in Philadelphia, Hemus made history when he was removed for pinch runner John Kennedy at Roosevelt Stadium in Jersey City, New Jersey, during a league game against the Brooklyn Dodgers on April 22, 1957. It marked the Major League debut of Kennedy, the first Black American player in the Phillies' history. In 2011, Hall-of-Famer Bob Gibson indicated that racial prejudice on Hemus' part had intruded on his later role as the Cards' manager when Hemus disparaged both Gibson and teammate Curt Flood by telling them they were not good enough to make it as Major Leaguers and should try something else. Hemus' replacement, Keane, was a Gibson supporter who had managed the pitcher in the minor leagues.

== Death ==
Following a long illness, Hemus died in Houston, on October 3, 2017, at age 94.

== See also ==
- List of Major League Baseball annual runs scored leaders
- List of Major League Baseball player-managers

Preceded by Franchise created	New York Mets third-base coach 1962–1963	Succeeded by Don Heffner
Preceded by George Strickland	Cleveland Indians third-base coach 1964	Succeeded by George Strickland
Preceded by Elmer Valo	Cleveland Indians first-base coach 1965	Succeeded by Reggie Otero
Preceded by Grover Resinger	Jacksonville Suns manager 1966	Succeeded by Bill Virdon
