= Toby Atwell =

American baseball player (1924–2003)

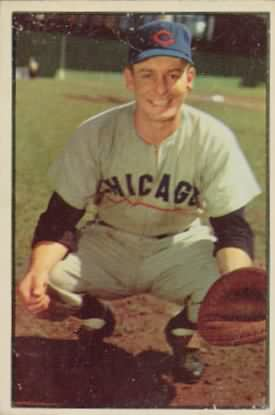
- Catcher
- Born: March 8, 1924; Leesburg, Virginia, U.S.
- Died: January 25, 2003 (aged 78); Purcellville, Virginia, U.S.
- Batted: Left Threw: Right

MLB debut
- April 15, 1952, for the Chicago Cubs

Last MLB appearance
- September 28, 1956, for the Milwaukee Braves

MLB statistics
- Batting average: .260
- Home runs: 9
- Runs batted in: 110
- Stats at Baseball Reference

Teams
- Chicago Cubs (1952–1953); Pittsburgh Pirates (1953–1956); Milwaukee Braves (1956)

Career highlights and awards
- All-Star (1952)

Maurice Dailey "Toby" Atwell (March 8, 1924 – January 25, 2003) was an American professional baseball player who was a catcher in Major League Baseball for the Chicago Cubs (1952–1953), Pittsburgh Pirates (1953–1956) and Milwaukee Braves (1956). Atwell, listed at 5 feet 9 inches (1.75 m) tall and 185 pounds (84 kg), batted left-handed and threw right-handed. He was born in Leesburg, Virginia, and served in the United States military during World War II.

== Career ==
Atwell's baseball career started in the Brooklyn Dodgers' organization in 1946. A strong defensive catcher, he shortened his career when he hurt his knee sliding while playing for the Triple-A Montreal Royals during the 1949 International League season. His most productive campaign came in his rookie year with the 1952 Cubs, when he posted career-highs in batting average (.290), RBI (31), runs (36), hits (105), doubles (16), games played (107), and was selected to the National League All-Star team. In 1953 he was part of a ten-player, early-June trade that saw the Cubs acquire Baseball Hall of Fame slugger Ralph Kiner from the Pittsburgh Pirates.

In his five-year major league career, Atwell was a .260 hitter with nine home runs and 110 RBI in 378 games. His 290 career hits also included 41 doubles and seven triples.

Atwell's last year as a player in pro ball was 1958. He died in Purcellville, Virginia, at the age of 78.
