= 1954 Philadelphia Phillies season =

1954 Philadelphia Phillies
- League: National League
- Ballpark: Connie Mack Stadium
- City: Philadelphia
- Owners: R. R. M. Carpenter, Jr.
- General managers: R. R. M. Carpenter, Jr., Roy Hamey
- Managers: Steve O'Neill, Terry Moore
- Television: WPTZ; WCAU; WFIL (Gene Kelly, George Walsh)
- Radio: WIBG; WIP (Gene Kelly, George Walsh, Herb Carneal)

The 1954 Philadelphia Phillies season was the 72nd season in the history of the franchise, and the 17th season for the Philadelphia Phillies at Connie Mack Stadium. The Phillies finished fourth in the National League with a record of 75 wins and 79 losses.

== Offseason ==
- December 1, 1953: 1953 minor league draft
  - Lee Tate was drafted by the Phillies from the Lubbock Hubbers.
  - Lee Tate was drafted from the Phillies by the New York Giants.
  - John Anderson was drafted from the Phillies by the New York Giants.
- Prior to 1954 season: John Anderson was returned to the Phillies by the Giants.

== Regular season ==
The Phillies and Philadelphia Athletics played their last Philadelphia City Series game against each other on June 28, 1954, in the seventh annual Junior Baseball Federation of Philadelphia benefit exhibition game. The Phillies beat the Athletics 3 to 2 in 7 innings in front of 15,993 fans.

=== Season standings ===
National League
Team	W	L	Pct.	GB	Home	Road
New York Giants	97	57	.630	—	53‍–‍23	44‍–‍34
Brooklyn Dodgers	92	62	.597	5	45‍–‍32	47‍–‍30
Milwaukee Braves	89	65	.578	8	43‍–‍34	46‍–‍31
Philadelphia Phillies	75	79	.487	22	39‍–‍39	36‍–‍40
Cincinnati Redlegs	74	80	.481	23	41‍–‍36	33‍–‍44
St. Louis Cardinals	72	82	.468	25	33‍–‍44	39‍–‍38
Chicago Cubs	64	90	.416	33	40‍–‍37	24‍–‍53
Pittsburgh Pirates	53	101	.344	44	31‍–‍46	22‍–‍55

=== Record vs. opponents ===
1954 National League record Sources:
Team	BRO	CHC	CIN	MIL	NYG	PHI	PIT	STL
Brooklyn	—	15–7	16–6	10–12	9–13	13–9	15–7	14–8
Chicago	7–15	—	8–14	6–16	7–15	7–15	15–7	14–8
Cincinnati	6–16	14–8	—	10–12	7–15	14–8	15–7	8–14
Milwaukee	12–10	16–6	12–10	—	10–12	13–9	14–8	12–10
New York	13–9	15–7	15–7	12–10	—	16–6	14–8	12–10
Philadelphia	9–13	15–7	8–14	9–13	6–16	—	16–6	12–10
Pittsburgh	7–15	7–15	7–15	8–14	8–14	6–16	—	10–12
St. Louis	8–14	8–14	14–8	10–12	10–12	10–12	12–10	—

=== Game log ===
Legend
	Phillies win
	Phillies win (via forfeit)
	Phillies loss
	Postponement
**Bold**	Phillies team member

1954 Game Log
Overall Record: 75–79
April (7–6)

#	Date	Opponent	Score	Win	Loss	Save	Attendance	Record
1	April 13	@ Pirates	2–4	Vern Law (1–0)	**Robin Roberts** (0–1)	Johnny Hetki (1)	32,294	0–1
2	April 14	@ Pirates	6–0	**Curt Simmons** (1–0)	Paul LaPalme (0–1)	None	5,853	1–1
3	April 15	Giants	2–0 (7)	**Murry Dickson** (1–0)	Johnny Antonelli (0–1)	None	15,345	2–1
–	April 17	Pirates	Postponed (rain); Makeup: July 7 as a traditional double-header					
4	April 18 (1)	Pirates	6–0	**Robin Roberts** (1–1)	Bob Friend (0–1)	None	see 2nd game	3–1
5	April 18 (2)	Pirates	7–1	**Curt Simmons** (2–0)	Vern Law (1–1)	None	9,975	4–1
6	April 19	Dodgers	7–9	Johnny Podres (1–0)	**Jim Konstanty** (0–1)	None	31,294	4–2
7	April 20	Dodgers	6–3	**Murry Dickson** (2–0)	Preacher Roe (0–1)	None	21,921	5–2
8	April 21	@ Dodgers	3–6	Billy Loes (1–0)	**Steve Ridzik** (0–1)	Jim Hughes (2)	27,724	5–3
–	April 23	@ Giants	Postponed (rain, wet grounds); Makeup: April 25 as a traditional double-header					
9	April 24	@ Giants	0–1	Marv Grissom (1–0)	**Robin Roberts** (1–2)	None	6,865	5–4
10	April 25 (1)	@ Giants	0–3	Sal Maglie (3–0)	**Curt Simmons** (2–1)	None	see 2nd game	5–5
11	April 25 (2)	@ Giants	0–5	Johnny Antonelli (2–1)	**Murry Dickson** (2–1)	None	22,778	5–6
–	April 27	@ Cubs	Postponed (rain, wet grounds); Makeup: June 9 as a double-header					
–	April 28	@ Cubs	Postponed (rain); Makeup: July 23 as a double-header					
12	April 29	@ Braves	4–0	**Robin Roberts** (2–2)	Warren Spahn (2–1)	None	18,793	6–6
13	April 30	@ Braves	5–2	**Murry Dickson** (3–1)	Gene Conley (0–1)	**Jim Konstanty** (1)	20,433	7–6

May (15–13)

#	Date	Opponent	Score	Win	Loss	Save	Attendance	Record
14	May 1	@ Braves	4–3 (10)	**Curt Simmons** (3–1)	Dave Jolly (2–1)	None	20,784	8–6
15	May 2 (1)	@ Redlegs	4–3	**Bob Miller** (1–0)	Howie Judson (1–2)	None	17,663	9–6
–	May 2 (2)	@ Redlegs	Postponed (rain, wet grounds); Makeup: July 15 as a traditional double-header					
16	May 4	@ Cardinals	14–10 (11)	**Murry Dickson** (4–1)	Cot Deal (0–2)	None	8,009	10–6
17	May 5	@ Cardinals	10–3	**Robin Roberts** (3–2)	Tom Poholsky (0–1)	None	8,422	11–6
–	May 6	@ Cardinals	Postponed (rain); Makeup: July 18 as a traditional double-header					
18	May 7	Dodgers	1–3	Don Newcombe (3–1)	**Curt Simmons** (3–2)	None	14,743	11–7
19	May 8	Dodgers	0–3 (6)	Johnny Podres (3–0)	**Murry Dickson** (4–2)	None	12,364	11–8
20	May 9	Dodgers	1–2	Carl Erskine (3–2)	**Robin Roberts** (3–3)	Jim Hughes (4)	13,818	11–9
21	May 11	Cubs	8–7 (10)	**Steve Ridzik** (1–1)	Turk Lown (0–1)	None	4,329	12–9
22	May 12	Cubs	5–4	**Curt Simmons** (4–2)	Warren Hacker (1–2)	None	4,407	13–9
23	May 13	Redlegs	8–1	**Robin Roberts** (4–3)	Corky Valentine (3–3)	None	6,856	14–9
24	May 14	Redlegs	0–1	Art Fowler (2–0)	**Murry Dickson** (4–3)	None	7,114	14–10
25	May 15	Redlegs	5–4	**Jim Konstanty** (1–1)	Jackie Collum (1–1)	None	3,981	15–10
26	May 16 (1)	Cardinals	3–7	Harvey Haddix (5–3)	**Jim Konstanty** (1–2)	Al Brazle (4)	see 2nd game	15–11
27	May 16 (2)	Cardinals	8–4^{^{[a]}}	**Paul Penson** (1–0)	Carl Scheib (0–2)	**Murry Dickson** (1)	24,495	16–11
28	May 17	Cardinals	0–8	Joe Presko (3–0)	**Robin Roberts** (4–4)	None	13,776	16–12
29	May 18	Braves	2–6	Chet Nichols (3–3)	**Curt Simmons** (4–3)	Dave Jolly (1)	9,254	16–13
30	May 19	Braves	2–6	Warren Spahn (4–3)	**Murry Dickson** (4–4)	None	9,910	16–14
–	May 20	Giants	Postponed (rain); Makeup: September 7					
31	May 21	Giants	8–1	**Robin Roberts** (5–4)	Johnny Antonelli (5–2)	None	7,021	17–14
32	May 22	Giants	0–5	Rubén Gómez (2–3)	**Paul Penson** (1–1)	None	12,183	17–15
33	May 23	Giants	4–6	Jim Hearn (1–3)	**Curt Simmons** (4–4)	Marv Grissom (3)	9,688	17–16
34	May 24	Giants	4–5	Hoyt Wilhelm (2–1)	**Murry Dickson** (4–5)	None	7,899	17–17
–	May 25	@ Dodgers	Postponed (rain, threatening weather); Makeup: August 16					
35	May 26	@ Dodgers	8–6	**Robin Roberts** (6–4)	Johnny Podres (4–1)	None	17,097	18–17
36	May 27	@ Dodgers	11–5	**Bob Miller** (2–0)	Don Newcombe (3–3)	None	3,183	19–17
37	May 28	@ Pirates	4–0 (6)	**Murry Dickson** (5–5)	Max Surkont (4–5)	None	5,521	20–17
38	May 29	@ Pirates	2–3	George O'Donnell (2–4)	**Steve Ridzik** (1–2)	None	2,525	20–18
39	May 30 (1)	@ Pirates	8–0	**Robin Roberts** (7–4)	Dick Littlefield (0–1)	None	2,525	21–18
40	May 30 (2)	@ Pirates	10–7	**Karl Drews** (1–0)	Bob Friend (1–5)	**Jim Konstanty** (2)	9,651	22–18
41	May 31	Dodgers	4–5 (12)	Clem Labine (2–2)	**Bob Miller** (2–1)	None	22,386	22–19

June (15–11)

#	Date	Opponent	Score	Win	Loss	Save	Attendance	Record
42	June 2	@ Redlegs	23–19	**Curt Simmons** (5–4)	Art Fowler (4–1)	None	8,509	23–19
–	June 3	@ Redlegs	Postponed (rain, wet grounds); Makeup: July 16 as a traditional double-header					
43	June 4	@ Cardinals	2–5	Harvey Haddix (8–3)	**Robin Roberts** (7–5)	None	11,789	23–20
44	June 5	@ Cardinals	9–4	**Murry Dickson** (6–5)	Vic Raschi (5–1)	None	14,519	24–20
45	June 6	@ Cardinals	11–8	**Bob Miller** (3–1)	Royce Lint (1–2)	None	18,547	25–20
46	June 8	@ Cubs	5–6	Howie Pollet (3–2)	**Robin Roberts** (7–6)	Johnny Klippstein (1)	6,775	25–21
47	June 9 (1)	@ Cubs	4–0	**Murry Dickson** (7–5)	Bob Rush (4–5)	None	34,268	26–21
48	June 9 (2)	@ Cubs	14–6	**Bob Miller** (4–1)	Jim Davis (1–2)	**Jim Konstanty** (3)	11,238	27–21
49	June 10	@ Cubs	6–0	**Jim Konstanty** (2–2)	Paul Minner (5–3)	None	4,926	28–21
50	June 11	@ Braves	0–1	Lew Burdette (6–5)	**Curt Simmons** (5–5)	None	35,047	28–22
51	June 12	@ Braves	0–2	Jim Wilson (2–0)	**Robin Roberts** (7–7)	None	28,218	28–23
52	June 13	@ Braves	5–9	Warren Spahn (7–5)	**Murry Dickson** (7–6)	None	39,859	28–24
53	June 15	Cardinals	1–3	Vic Raschi (6–2)	**Bob Miller** (4–2)	None	10,684	28–25
–	June 16	Cardinals	Postponed (wet grounds); Makeup: July 31 as a traditional double-header					
54	June 17	Cardinals	3–2 (15)	**Robin Roberts** (8–7)	Joe Presko (3–6)	None	12,881	29–25
55	June 18	Redlegs	1–2	Corky Valentine (6–5)	**Curt Simmons** (5–6)	Frank Smith (9)	8,589	29–26
56	June 19	Redlegs	6–7	Jackie Collum (4–1)	**Murry Dickson** (7–7)	Frank Smith (10)	4,257	29–27
57	June 20 (1)	Redlegs	3–4	Fred Baczewski (5–3)	**Bob Miller** (4–3)	None	see 2nd game	29–28
58	June 20 (2)	Redlegs	6–15	Art Fowler (5–3)	**Herm Wehmeier** (0–4)	None	14,832	29–29
59	June 22	Cubs	4–1	**Robin Roberts** (9–7)	Paul Minner (5–4)	None	8,128	30–29
60	June 23	Cubs	5–3	**Curt Simmons** (6–6)	Howie Pollet (3–4)	None	6,927	31–29
61	June 24	Cubs	3–2 (11)	**Herm Wehmeier** (1–4)	Paul Minner (5–5)	None	6,060	32–29
62	June 25	Braves	0–7	Lew Burdette (7–7)	**Bob Miller** (4–4)	None	16,560	32–30
63	June 26	Braves	10–3	**Robin Roberts** (10–7)	Chet Nichols (4–6)	None	5,373	33–30
64	June 27 (1)	Braves	4–3	**Curt Simmons** (7–6)	Dave Jolly (4–3)	None	5,373	34–30
65	June 27 (2)	Braves	2–1	**Steve Ridzik** (2–2)	Warren Spahn (7–8)	None	19,073	35–30
66	June 29	@ Pirates	4–0	**Herm Wehmeier** (2–4)	Max Surkont (6–9)	None	5,088	36–30
67	June 30	@ Pirates	8–0	**Robin Roberts** (11–7)	Vern Law (6–9)	None	4,209	37–30

July (11–21)

#	Date	Opponent	Score	Win	Loss	Save	Attendance	Record
68	July 2	Dodgers	7–6	**Steve Ridzik** (3–2)	Clem Labine (4–4)	**Robin Roberts** (1)	21,929	38–30
69	July 3	Dodgers	3–4	Bob Milliken (5–0)	**Bob Miller** (4–5)	None	8,980	38–31
70	July 4	Dodgers	3–5 (10)	Carl Erskine (9–7)	**Robin Roberts** (11–8)	None	15,420	38–32
71	July 5 (1)	@ Giants	0–10	Johnny Antonelli (12–2)	**Herm Wehmeier** (2–5)	None	see 2nd game	38–33
72	July 5 (2)	@ Giants	3–4	Hoyt Wilhelm (8–2)	**Murry Dickson** (7–8)	None	36,547	38–34
73	July 6	Pirates	3–0	**Curt Simmons** (8–6)	Bob Friend (3–7)	None	3,967	39–34
–	July 7 (1)	Pirates	Postponed (rain); Makeup: August 13 as a double-header					
–	July 7 (2)	Pirates	Postponed (rain); Makeup: September 21 as a double-header					
74	July 9	@ Dodgers	5–7 (10)	Erv Palica (3–1)	**Murry Dickson** (7–9)	None	13,586	39–35
75	July 10	@ Dodgers	5–10	Billy Loes (4–3)	**Bob Miller** (4–6)	None	11,047	39–36
76	July 11 (1)	@ Dodgers	7–8	Carl Erskine (10–8)	**Jim Konstanty** (2–3)	Jim Hughes (15)	11,047	39–37
77	July 11 (2)	@ Dodgers	3–1	**Herm Wehmeier** (3–5)	Don Newcombe (5–5)	**Robin Roberts** (2)	23,973	40–37
–	July 13	**1954 Major League Baseball All-Star Game at Cleveland Stadium in Cleveland**						
78	July 15 (1)	@ Redlegs	1–2	Art Fowler (7–5)	**Curt Simmons** (8–7)	None	see 2nd game	40–38
79	July 15 (2)	@ Redlegs	3–4	Jackie Collum (6–1)	**Bob Miller** (4–7)	Howie Judson (2)	12,232	40–39
80	July 16 (1)	@ Redlegs	6–7 (10)	Frank Smith (4–1)	**Steve Ridzik** (3–3)	None	see 2nd game	40–40
81	July 16 (2)	@ Redlegs	4–9	Joe Nuxhall (4–2)	**Herm Wehmeier** (3–6)	None	28,878	40–41
82	July 17	@ Redlegs	5–3	**Bob Miller** (5–7)	Moe Savransky (0–1)	None	4,859	41–41
83	July 18 (1)	@ Cardinals	11–10 (10)	**Robin Roberts** (12–8)	Brooks Lawrence (4–3)	**Curt Simmons** (1)	18,958	42–41
84	July 18 (2)	@ Cardinals	0–0^{^{[b]}} (0)	None	None	None	see 1st game	43–41
85	July 19	@ Cardinals	1–5	Brooks Lawrence (5–3)	**Bob Greenwood** (0–1)	None	8,488	43–42
86	July 20	@ Cardinals	2–4	Harvey Haddix (14–6)	**Curt Simmons** (8–8)	Gerry Staley (3)	8,829	43–43
87	July 21	@ Braves	6–1	**Robin Roberts** (13–8)	Gene Conley (8–5)	None	36,799	44–43
88	July 22	@ Braves	2–3	Lew Burdette (8–11)	**Murry Dickson** (7–10)	None	23,146	44–44
89	July 23 (1)	@ Cubs	2–5	Howie Pollet (5–5)	**Herm Wehmeier** (3–7)	None	16,438	44–45
90	July 23 (2)	@ Cubs	5–3 (13)	**Robin Roberts** (14–8)	Bill Tremel (1–1)	None	8,563	45–45
91	July 24	@ Cubs	0–4	Dave Cole (1–2)	**Curt Simmons** (8–9)	None	10,246	45–46
92	July 25 (1)	@ Cubs	1–6	Paul Minner (9–6)	**Steve Ridzik** (3–4)	None	10,246	45–47
93	July 25 (2)	@ Cubs	1–2	Jim Davis (7–2)	**Bob Greenwood** (0–2)	None	23,353	45–48
94	July 27	Redlegs	8–2	**Robin Roberts** (15–8)	Bud Podbielan (6–5)	None	11,415	46–48
95	July 28	Redlegs	3–2	**Herm Wehmeier** (4–7)	Frank Smith (4–3)	None	6,463	47–48
96	July 29	Redlegs	0–3	Corky Valentine (8–9)	**Murry Dickson** (7–11)	None	5,408	47–49
97	July 30	Cardinals	3–12	Harvey Haddix (15–7)	**Bob Miller** (5–8)	None	12,194	47–50
98	July 31 (1)	Cardinals	2–3	Brooks Lawrence (8–3)	**Robin Roberts** (15–9)	Harvey Haddix (3)	see 2nd game	47–51
99	July 31 (2)	Cardinals	6–5	**Bob Greenwood** (1–2)	Royce Lint (2–3)	**Murry Dickson** (2)	27,204	48–51

August (12–18)

#	Date	Opponent	Score	Win	Loss	Save	Attendance	Record
100	August 1	Cardinals	8–3	**Curt Simmons** (9–9)	Ralph Beard (0–2)	None	5,707	49–51
101	August 3	Braves	1–3	Warren Spahn (11–10)	**Murry Dickson** (7–12)	None	13,899	49–52
102	August 4	Braves	2–1	**Robin Roberts** (16–9)	Chet Nichols (7–8)	None	16,093	50–52
–	August 5	Braves	Postponed (rain); Makeup: September 12 as a double-header					
103	August 6	Cubs	7–4	**Curt Simmons** (10–9)	Howie Pollet (6–6)	None	7,060	51–52
104	August 7	Cubs	8–2	**Bob Miller** (6–8)	Dave Cole (2–4)	**Murry Dickson** (3)	3,807	52–52
105	August 8 (1)	Cubs	8–4	**Robin Roberts** (17–9)	Hal Jeffcoat (3–4)	None	3,807	53–52
106	August 8 (2)	Cubs	8–3	**Herm Wehmeier** (5–7)	Bob Rush (7–13)	None	10,400	54–52
107	August 10	Dodgers	6–3	**Curt Simmons** (11–9)	Johnny Podres (7–5)	**Robin Roberts** (3)	31,421	55–52
108	August 11	Dodgers	2–3	Billy Loes (7–3)	**Murry Dickson** (7–13)	None	24,536	55–53
109	August 13 (1)	Pirates	5–9	Bob Friend (5–10)	**Robin Roberts** (17–10)	None	24,536	55–54
110	August 13 (2)	Pirates	0–5	Jake Thies (2–3)	**Herm Wehmeier** (5–8)	None	8,804	55–55
111	August 14	Pirates	4–8	Vern Law (8–12)	**Curt Simmons** (11–10)	None	2,865	55–56
112	August 15 (1)	Pirates	6–9	Dick Littlefield (8–6)	**Murry Dickson** (7–14)	Johnny Hetki (8)	2,865	55–57
113	August 15 (2)	Pirates	7–6^{^{[c]}}	**Robin Roberts** (18–10)	Johnny Hetki (3–3)	None	4,773	56–57
114	August 16	@ Dodgers	9–6	**Robin Roberts** (19–10)	Clem Labine (5–5)	None	15,814	57–57
115	August 17	@ Giants	3–8	Johnny Antonelli (18–3)	**Curt Simmons** (11–11)	None	15,688	57–58
116	August 18	@ Giants	2–6	Sal Maglie (12–6)	**Herm Wehmeier** (5–9)	None	9,992	57–59
117	August 19	@ Giants	0–5	Rubén Gómez (11–8)	**Murry Dickson** (7–15)	None	6,530	57–60
118	August 20	@ Dodgers	4–6	Billy Loes (9–3)	**Robin Roberts** (19–11)	Clem Labine (3)	15,057	57–61
–	August 21	@ Dodgers	Postponed (rain); Makeup: August 22 as a double-header					
119	August 22 (1)	@ Dodgers	6–2	**Herm Wehmeier** (6–9)	Carl Erskine (16–11)	None	15,057	58–61
120	August 22 (2)	@ Dodgers	6–0	**Murry Dickson** (8–15)	Russ Meyer (9–5)	None	26,349	59–61
121	August 24	@ Braves	1–5	Warren Spahn (15–10)	**Robin Roberts** (19–12)	None	37,749	59–62
122	August 25	@ Braves	3–4	Lew Burdette (12–11)	**Curt Simmons** (11–12)	Dave Jolly (9)	30,689	59–63
123	August 26	@ Braves	2–3	Ernie Johnson (3–1)	**Herm Wehmeier** (6–10)	None	24,863	59–64
124	August 27	@ Cubs	3–4 (12)	Jim Davis (8–5)	**Murry Dickson** (8–16)	None	5,790	59–65
125	August 28	@ Cubs	2–5	Dave Cole (3–5)	**Steve Ridzik** (3–5)	Warren Hacker (3)	9,350	59–66
126	August 29 (1)	@ Redlegs	2–3	Art Fowler (11–8)	**Robin Roberts** (19–13)	None	2,995	59–67
127	August 29 (2)	@ Redlegs	4–8	Fred Baczewski (6–6)	**Bob Miller** (6–9)	Frank Smith (19)	14,006	59–68
128	August 30	@ Redlegs	1–5	Jackie Collum (7–2)	**Curt Simmons** (11–13)	None	5,392	59–69
129	August 31	@ Redlegs	9–3	**Herm Wehmeier** (7–10)	Bud Podbielan (7–8)	None	2,636	60–69

September (15–10)

#	Date	Opponent	Score	Win	Loss	Save	Attendance	Record
130	September 1	@ Cardinals	5–2	**Murry Dickson** (9–16)	Brooks Lawrence (11–6)	None	7,287	61–69
131	September 2	@ Cardinals	5–4	**Robin Roberts** (20–13)	Harvey Haddix (15–11)	None	4,343	62–69
132	September 3 (1)	@ Pirates	7–1	**Curt Simmons** (12–13)	Bob Friend (5–11)	None	10,790	63–69
133	September 3 (2)	@ Pirates	10–2	**Steve Ridzik** (4–5)	Dick Littlefield (9–9)	None	5,302	64–69
134	September 5	@ Pirates	12–5	**Herm Wehmeier** (8–10)	Laurin Pepper (1–3)	None	4,645	65–69
135	September 6 (1)	Giants	4–8	Don Liddle (7–3)	**Murry Dickson** (9–17)	Marv Grissom (16)	see 2nd game	65–70
136	September 6 (2)	Giants	5–4 (11)	**Robin Roberts** (21–13)	Al Worthington (0–2)	None	35,272	66–70
137	September 7	Giants	1–3 (11)	Rubén Gómez (14–9)	**Curt Simmons** (12–14)	Hoyt Wilhelm (7)	13,535	66–71
138	September 8	Redlegs	3–9	Frank Smith (5–7)	**Murry Dickson** (9–18)	None	3,913	66–72
–	September 10	Cubs	Postponed (rain); Makeup: September 11 as a double-header					
139	September 11 (1)	Cubs	3–0	**Herm Wehmeier** (9–10)	Jim Davis (10–7)	None	3,913	67–72
140	September 11 (2)	Cubs	8–2	**Bob Miller** (7–9)	Howie Pollet (8–9)	None	1,642	68–72
141	September 12 (1)	Braves	5–2	**Murry Dickson** (10–18)	Warren Spahn (19–11)	None	3,913	69–72
142	September 12 (2)	Braves	1–2	Lew Burdette (14–12)	**Robin Roberts** (21–14)	None	17,598	69–73
143	September 13	Braves	4–7	Dave Jolly (9–6)	**Curt Simmons** (12–15)	None	11,189	69–74
144	September 14	Cardinals	2–5	Brooks Lawrence (13–6)	**Ron Mrozinski** (0–1)	None	5,157	69–75
145	September 15	Cardinals	1–3	Tom Poholsky (4–6)	**Herm Wehmeier** (9–11)	None	1,997	69–76
146	September 17	@ Giants	4–3	**Robin Roberts** (22–14)	Johnny Antonelli (21–6)	None	11,540	70–76
147	September 18	@ Giants	1–9	Don Liddle (8–4)	**Murry Dickson** (10–19)	Marv Grissom (17)	7,988	70–77
–	September 19	@ Giants	Postponed (rain); Makeup: September 24 as a traditional double-header in Philadelphia					
–	September 21 (1)	Pirates	Postponed (rain); Makeup: September 22 as a double-header					
–	September 21 (2)	Pirates	Postponed (rain); Makeup: September 23					
148	September 22 (1)	Pirates	12–1	**Curt Simmons** (13–15)	Laurin Pepper (1–5)	None	5,157	71–77
149	September 22 (2)	Pirates	5–1	**Robin Roberts** (23–14)	Dick Littlefield (10–11)	None	2,837	72–77
150	September 23	Pirates	4–2	**Herm Wehmeier** (10–11)	Paul LaPalme (4–10)	None	936	73–77
151	September 24 (1)	Giants	0–1	Don Liddle (9–4)	**Murry Dickson** (10–20)	None	see 2nd game	73–78
152	September 24 (2)	Giants	4–2	**Ron Mrozinski** (1–1)	Windy McCall (2–4)	**Robin Roberts** (4)	12,165	74–78
153	September 25	Giants	2–1 (11)	**Curt Simmons** (14–15)	Windy McCall (2–5)	None	6,310	75–78
154	September 26	Giants	2–3 (11)	George Spencer (1–0)	**Robin Roberts** (23–15)	None	7,992	75–79

^{^[a]}The second game on May 16 was suspended (Sunday curfew) at the end of the sixth inning with the score 6–3 and was completed May 17, 1954.
^{^[b]}The second game on July 18, 1954, was forfeited in favor of the Phillies. Contemporary newspaper accounts indicate a 9–0 final score as a result of the forfeiture, but Baseball Reference indicates a 0–0 score and Phillies victory.
^{^[c]}The second game on August 15 was suspended (Sunday curfew) at the end of the eighth inning with the score 6–6 and was ultimately completed September 23, 1954 (after being attempted on September 21 and 22).

=== Roster ===
1954 Philadelphia Phillies
**Roster**
**Pitchers**: 20 Murry Dickson; 22 Karl Drews; 26 Bob Greenwood; 34 Thornton Kipper; 35 Jim Konstanty; 19 Bob Miller; 27 Ron Mrozinski; 44 Paul Penson; 37 Steve Ridzik; 36 Robin Roberts; 28 Curt Simmons; 22 Herm Wehmeier	**Catchers**: 21 Smoky Burgess; 29 Stan Lopata; 25 Gus Niarhos; **Infielders**: 38 Floyd Baker; 5 Jim Command; 2 Granny Hamner; 6 Willie Jones; 7 Ted Kazanski; 5 Mickey Micelotta; 4 Bobby Morgan; 9 Earl Torgeson	**Outfielders**: 1 Richie Ashburn; 16 Mel Clark; 14 Del Ennis; 15 Stan Palys; 10 Danny Schell; 17 Johnny Wyrostek; **Other batters**: 12 Stan Jok; 18 Johnny Lindell	**Manager**: 8 Terry Moore; 24 Steve O'Neill; **Coaches**: 11 Benny Bengough; 31 Earle Combs; 32 Eddie Mayo; 40 Maje McDonnell; 30 Cy Perkins

== Player stats ==
=== Batting ===
==== Starters by position ====
Note: Pos = Position; G = Games played; AB = At bats; H = Hits; Avg. = Batting average; HR = Home runs; RBI = Runs batted in

Pos	Player	G	AB	H	Avg.	HR	RBI
C	Smoky Burgess	108	345	127	.368	4	46
1B	Earl Torgeson	135	490	133	.271	5	54
2B	Granny Hamner	152	596	178	.299	13	89
SS	Bobby Morgan	135	455	119	.262	14	50
3B	Willie Jones	142	535	145	.271	12	56
LF	Del Ennis	145	556	145	.261	25	119
CF	Richie Ashburn	153	559	175	.313	1	41
RF	Johnny Wyrostek	92	259	62	.239	3	28

==== Other batters ====
Note: G = Games played; AB = At bats; H = Hits; Avg. = Batting average; HR = Home runs; RBI = Runs batted in

Player	G	AB	H	Avg.	HR	RBI
Danny Schell	92	272	77	.283	7	33
Stan Lopata	86	259	75	.290	14	42
Mel Clark	83	233	56	.240	1	24
Ted Kazanski	39	104	14	.135	1	8
Floyd Baker	23	22	5	.227	0	0
Jim Command	9	18	4	.222	1	6
Johnny Lindell	7	5	1	.200	0	2
Gus Niarhos	3	5	1	.200	0	0
Stan Palys	2	4	1	.250	0	0
Mickey Micelotta	13	3	0	.000	0	0
Stan Jok	3	3	0	.000	0	0

=== Pitching ===
= Indicates league leader

==== Starting pitchers ====
Note: G = Games pitched; IP = Innings pitched; W = Wins; L = Losses; ERA = Earned run average; SO = Strikeouts

Player	G	IP	W	L	ERA	SO
Robin Roberts	45	336.2	23	15	2.97	185
Curt Simmons	34	253.0	14	15	2.81	125
Murry Dickson	40	226.1	10	20	3.78	64
Herm Wehmeier	25	138.0	10	8	3.85	49

==== Other pitchers ====
Note: G = Games pitched; IP = Innings pitched; W = Wins; L = Losses; ERA = Earned run average; SO = Strikeouts

Player	G	IP	W	L	ERA	SO
Bob Miller	30	150.0	7	9	4.56	42
Ron Mrozinski	15	48.0	1	1	4.50	26
Bob Greenwood	11	36.2	1	2	3.19	9
Paul Penson	5	16.0	1	1	4.50	3

==== Relief pitchers ====
Note: G = Games pitched; W = Wins; L = Losses; SV = Saves; ERA = Earned run average; SO = Strikeouts

Player	G	W	L	SV	ERA	SO
Steve Ridzik	35	4	5	0	4.13	45
Jim Konstanty	33	2	3	3	3.75	11
Thornton Kipper	11	0	0	0	7.90	5
Karl Drews	8	1	0	0	5.63	6

== Awards and honors ==
All-Star Game

- Smoky Burgess, Catcher, Reserve
- Robin Roberts, Pitcher, Reserve

== Farm system ==
Level	Team	League	Manager
AAA	Syracuse Chiefs	International League	Skeeter Newsome
A	Schenectady Blue Jays	Eastern League	Snuffy Stirnweiss and Lew Krausse Sr.
A	Spokane Indians	Western International League	Don Osborn
B	Terre Haute Phillies	Illinois–Indiana–Iowa League	Hub Kittle
C	Salt Lake City Bees	Pioneer League	Charlie Gassaway
C	Trois-Rivières Phillies	Provincial League	Al Barillari and Snuffy Stirnweiss
D	Pulaski Phillies	Appalachian League	George Triandos
D	Mattoon Phillies	Mississippi–Ohio Valley League	Carl Bush and Don Osborn
D	Bradford Phillies	PONY League	Jim Deery

LEAGUE CHAMPIONS: Syracuse
Spokane club disbanded, June 21, 1954
