= 1954 New York Giants (MLB) season =

Major League Baseball season

1954 New York Giants
- World Series champions National League champions
- League: National League
- Ballpark: Polo Grounds
- City: New York City
- Record: 97–57 (.630)
- League place: 1st
- Owners: Horace Stoneham
- General managers: Chub Feeney
- Managers: Leo Durocher
- Television: WPIX (Russ Hodges, Bob DeLaney)
- Radio: WMCA (Russ Hodges, Bob DeLaney)

The 1954 New York Giants season was the franchise's 72nd season. The Giants won the National League pennant with a record of 97 wins and 57 losses and then defeated the Cleveland Indians in four games in the World Series. It was the team's final World Series championship until 2010.

== Offseason ==
- October 8, 1953: Chuck Diering, Frank Hiller, Adrián Zabala and $60,000 were traded by the Giants to the San Francisco Seals for Windy McCall.
- December 1, 1953: 1953 minor league draft
  - Lee Tate was drafted by the Giants from the Philadelphia Phillies.
  - John Anderson was drafted by the Giants from the Philadelphia Phillies.
- February 2, 1954: Joey Amalfitano was signed as an amateur free agent (bonus baby) by the Giants.
- Prior to 1954 season (exact date unknown)
  - John Anderson was returned by the Giants to the Phillies.
  - Ramón Conde was signed as an amateur free agent by the Giants.

== Regular season ==
- September 22, 1954: In a game against the New York Giants, Karl Spooner of the Brooklyn Dodgers struck out 15 batters in his first game, setting a Major League record.

=== Season standings ===
National League
Team	W	L	Pct.	GB	Home	Road
New York Giants	97	57	.630	—	53‍–‍23	44‍–‍34
Brooklyn Dodgers	92	62	.597	5	45‍–‍32	47‍–‍30
Milwaukee Braves	89	65	.578	8	43‍–‍34	46‍–‍31
Philadelphia Phillies	75	79	.487	22	39‍–‍39	36‍–‍40
Cincinnati Redlegs	74	80	.481	23	41‍–‍36	33‍–‍44
St. Louis Cardinals	72	82	.468	25	33‍–‍44	39‍–‍38
Chicago Cubs	64	90	.416	33	40‍–‍37	24‍–‍53
Pittsburgh Pirates	53	101	.344	44	31‍–‍46	22‍–‍55

=== Record vs. opponents ===
1954 National League record Sources:
Team	BRO	CHC	CIN	MIL	NYG	PHI	PIT	STL
Brooklyn	—	15–7	16–6	10–12	9–13	13–9	15–7	14–8
Chicago	7–15	—	8–14	6–16	7–15	7–15	15–7	14–8
Cincinnati	6–16	14–8	—	10–12	7–15	14–8	15–7	8–14
Milwaukee	12–10	16–6	12–10	—	10–12	13–9	14–8	12–10
New York	13–9	15–7	15–7	12–10	—	16–6	14–8	12–10
Philadelphia	9–13	15–7	8–14	9–13	6–16	—	16–6	12–10
Pittsburgh	7–15	7–15	7–15	8–14	8–14	6–16	—	10–12
St. Louis	8–14	8–14	14–8	10–12	10–12	10–12	12–10	—

=== Notable transactions ===
- April 13, 1954: Tony Taylor was signed as an amateur free agent by the Giants.
- September 8, 1954: Joe Garagiola was selected off waivers by the Giants from the Chicago Cubs.

=== Roster ===
1954 New York Giants
Roster
Pitchers: 43 Johnny Antonelli; 34,41 Al Corwin; 31 Paul Giel; 28 Rubén Gómez; 42 Marv Grissom; 21 Jim Hearn; 46 Larry Jansen; 38 Alex Konikowski; 37 Don Liddle; 35 Sal Maglie; 40 Windy McCall; 34 Ramón Monzant; 36 Mario Picone; 30 George Spencer; 49 Hoyt Wilhelm; 33 Al Worthington	Catchers: 36 Joe Garagiola; 8 Ray Katt; 7 Ebba St. Claire; 9 Wes Westrum; Infielders: 12 Joey Amalfitano; 18 Foster Castleman; 19 Alvin Dark; 15 Billy Gardner; 14 Bobby Hofman; 25 Whitey Lockman; 17 Ron Samford; 16 Hank Thompson; 10 Davey Williams	Outfielders: 23 Hoot Evers; 20 Monte Irvin; 24 Willie Mays; 22 Don Mueller; 26 Dusty Rhodes; 5 Eric Rodin; 27 Bill Taylor; Other batters: 41 Harvey Gentry; 23 Bob Lennon	Manager: 2 Leo Durocher; Coaches: 6 Fred Fitzsimmons; 3 Herman Franks; 46 Larry Jansen; 1 Frank Shellenback

== Player stats ==
=== Batting ===
==== Starters by position ====
Note: Pos = Position; G = Games played; AB = At bats; H = Hits; Avg. = Batting average; HR = Home runs; RBI = Runs batted in

Pos	Player	G	AB	H	Avg.	HR	RBI
C	Wes Westrum	98	246	46	.187	8	27
1B	Whitey Lockman	148	570	143	.251	16	60
2B	Davey Williams	142	544	121	.222	9	46
SS	Al Dark	154	644	189	.293	20	70
3B	Hank Thompson	136	448	118	.263	26	86
LF	Monte Irvin	135	432	113	.262	19	64
CF	Willie Mays	151	565	195	.345	41	110
RF	Don Mueller	153	619	212	.342	4	71

==== Other batters ====
Note: G = Games played; AB = At bats; H = Hits; Avg. = Batting average; HR = Home runs; RBI = Runs batted in

Player	G	AB	H	Avg.	HR	RBI
Ray Katt	86	200	51	.255	9	33
Dusty Rhodes	82	164	56	.341	15	50
Bobby Hofman	71	125	28	.224	8	30
Billy Gardner	62	108	23	.213	1	7
Bill Taylor	55	65	12	.185	2	10
Ebba St. Claire	20	42	11	.262	2	6
Foster Castleman	13	12	3	.250	0	1
Joe Garagiola	5	11	3	.273	0	1
Hoot Evers	12	11	1	.091	1	3
Eric Rodin	5	6	0	.000	0	0
Ron Samford	12	5	0	.000	0	0
Joey Amalfitano	9	5	0	.000	0	0
Harvey Gentry	5	4	1	.250	0	1
Bob Lennon	3	3	0	.000	0	0

=== Pitching ===
==== Starting pitchers ====
Note: G = Games pitched; IP = Innings pitched; W = Wins; L = Losses; ERA = Earned run average; SO = Strikeouts

Player	G	IP	W	L	ERA	SO
Johnny Antonelli	39	258.2	21	7	2.30	152
Rubén Gómez	37	221.2	17	9	2.88	106
Sal Maglie	34	218.1	14	6	3.26	117

==== Other pitchers ====
Note: G = Games pitched; IP = Innings pitched; W = Wins; L = Losses; ERA = Earned run average; SO = Strikeouts

Player	G	IP	W	L	ERA	SO
Jim Hearn	29	130.0	8	8	4.15	45
Don Liddle	28	126.2	9	4	3.06	44
Larry Jansen	13	40.2	2	2	5.98	15

==== Relief pitchers ====
Note: G = Games pitched; W = Wins; L = Losses; SV = Saves; ERA = Earned run average; SO = Strikeouts

Player	G	W	L	SV	ERA	SO
Marv Grissom	56	10	7	19	2.35	64
Hoyt Wilhelm	57	12	4	7	2.10	64
Windy McCall	33	2	5	2	3.25	38
Al Corwin	20	1	3	0	4.02	14
Alex Konikowski	10	0	0	0	7.50	6
Al Worthington	10	0	2	0	3.50	8
Ramón Monzant	6	0	0	0	4.70	5
Paul Giel	6	0	0	0	8.31	4
George Spencer	6	1	0	0	3.65	4
Mario Picone	5	0	0	0	5.27	6

== 1954 World Series ==
The New York Giants swept the Cleveland Indians in what would be their final World Series win in New York. Their next World Series win would occur in 2010, 52 years after relocating to San Francisco.

It was the first time the Cleveland Indians had been swept in a World Series. The only highlight for the Indians was that they kept the Yankees from winning their sixth straight series. The last time the Yankees had not won the series or pennant beforehand was 1948, when, again, the Indians kept them out (although that year, they won the Series). It was also the only World Series from 1949 to 1958 which did not feature the Yankees.

=== Game 1 ===
September 29, 1954, at the Polo Grounds in New York City

Team	1	2	3	4	5	6	7	8	9	10	R	H	E
Cleveland (A)	2	0	0	0	0	0	0	0	0	0	2	8	0
New York (N)	0	0	2	0	0	0	0	0	0	3	5	9	3
W: Marv Grissom (1–0) L: Bob Lemon (0–1)
HR: NYG – Dusty Rhodes (1)

=== Game 2 ===
September 30, 1954, at the Polo Grounds in New York City

Team	1	2	3	4	5	6	7	8	9	R	H	E
Cleveland (A)	1	0	0	0	0	0	0	0	0	1	8	0
New York (N)	0	0	0	0	2	0	1	0	x	3	4	0
W: Johnny Antonelli (1–0) L: Early Wynn (0–1)
HR: CLE – Al Smith (1) NYG – Dusty Rhodes (2)

=== Game 3 ===
October 1, 1954, at Cleveland Stadium in Cleveland, Ohio

Team	1	2	3	4	5	6	7	8	9	R	H	E
New York (N)	1	0	3	0	1	1	0	0	0	6	10	1
Cleveland (A)	0	0	0	0	0	0	1	1	0	2	4	2
W: Ruben Gomez (1–0) L: Mike Garcia (0–1) S: Hoyt Wilhelm (1)
HR: CLE – Vic Wertz (1)

=== Game 4 ===
October 2, 1954, at Cleveland Stadium in Cleveland, Ohio

Team	1	2	3	4	5	6	7	8	9	R	H	E
New York (N)	0	2	1	0	4	0	0	0	0	7	10	3
Cleveland (A)	0	0	0	0	3	0	1	0	0	4	6	2
W: Don Liddle (1–0) L: Bob Lemon (0–2) S: Johnny Antonelli (1)
HR: CLE – Hank Majeski (1)

== Awards and honors ==
- Willie Mays, Associated Press Athlete of the Year

== Farm system ==
Level	Team	League	Manager
AAA	Minneapolis Millers	American Association	Bill Rigney
AA	Nashville Vols	Southern Association	Hugh Poland
A	Sioux City Soos	Western League	Dave Garcia
B	Danville Leafs	Carolina League	Andy Gilbert
C	St. Cloud Rox	Northern League	Charlie Fox
C	Muskogee Giants	Western Association	John Davenport
D	Mayfield Clothiers	KITTY League	Red Davis
D	Danville Dans	Mississippi–Ohio Valley League	Richie Klaus
D	Olean Giants	PONY League	Austin Knickerbocker and Frank Genovese
D	Shelby Clippers	Tar Heel League	Harold Kollar

LEAGUE CHAMPIONS: Danville (M-OV)

Tar Heel League disbanded, June 21, 1954
