= 1954 St. Louis Cardinals season =

Major League Baseball season

1954 St. Louis Cardinals
- League: National League
- Ballpark: Busch Stadium I
- City: St. Louis, Missouri
- Record: 72–82 (.468)
- League place: 6th
- Owners: August "Gussie" Busch
- General managers: Richard A. Meyer
- Managers: Eddie Stanky
- Television: WTVI
- Radio: KXOK (Harry Caray, Jack Buck, Milo Hamilton)
- Stats: ESPN.com; Baseball Reference

The 1954 St. Louis Cardinals season was the team's 73rd season in St. Louis, Missouri and its 63rd season in the National League. The Cardinals went 72–82 during the season and finished sixth in the National League.

== Offseason ==
- December 1, 1953: 1953 minor league draft
  - Brooks Lawrence was drafted by the Cardinals from the Cincinnati Reds.
- December 1, 1953: Sonny Senerchia was drafted by the Cardinals from the Pittsburgh Pirates.
- January 26, 1954: Dick Sisler, Eddie Erautt and $100,000 were traded by the Cardinals to the San Diego Padres for Tom Alston.

== Regular season ==
In his first four major league games, first baseman Joe Cunningham became the first Cardinals player to hit at least two home runs. On April 6, 2016, Jeremy Hazelbaker matched him for this feat.

Outfielder Wally Moon won the Rookie of the Year Award this year, batting .304, with 12 home runs and 76 RBIs. Along the way, on April 13 Moon hit a home run in his first major league at-bat.

During the season, Tom Alston became the first black player in the history of the Cardinals.

=== Season standings ===
National League
Team	W	L	Pct.	GB	Home	Road
New York Giants	97	57	.630	—	53‍–‍23	44‍–‍34
Brooklyn Dodgers	92	62	.597	5	45‍–‍32	47‍–‍30
Milwaukee Braves	89	65	.578	8	43‍–‍34	46‍–‍31
Philadelphia Phillies	75	79	.487	22	39‍–‍39	36‍–‍40
Cincinnati Redlegs	74	80	.481	23	41‍–‍36	33‍–‍44
St. Louis Cardinals	72	82	.468	25	33‍–‍44	39‍–‍38
Chicago Cubs	64	90	.416	33	40‍–‍37	24‍–‍53
Pittsburgh Pirates	53	101	.344	44	31‍–‍46	22‍–‍55

=== Record vs. opponents ===
1954 National League record Sources:
Team	BRO	CHC	CIN	MIL	NYG	PHI	PIT	STL
Brooklyn	—	15–7	16–6	10–12	9–13	13–9	15–7	14–8
Chicago	7–15	—	8–14	6–16	7–15	7–15	15–7	14–8
Cincinnati	6–16	14–8	—	10–12	7–15	14–8	15–7	8–14
Milwaukee	12–10	16–6	12–10	—	10–12	13–9	14–8	12–10
New York	13–9	15–7	15–7	12–10	—	16–6	14–8	12–10
Philadelphia	9–13	15–7	8–14	9–13	6–16	—	16–6	12–10
Pittsburgh	7–15	7–15	7–15	8–14	8–14	6–16	—	10–12
St. Louis	8–14	8–14	14–8	10–12	10–12	10–12	12–10	—

=== Notable transactions ===
- April 11, 1954: Enos Slaughter was traded by the Cardinals to the New York Yankees for Bill Virdon, Mel Wright, and Emil Tellinger (minors).
- April 30, 1954: Steve Bilko was purchased from the Cardinals by the Chicago Cubs for $12,500.

=== Roster ===
1954 St. Louis Cardinals
Roster
Pitchers: 39 Ralph Beard; 27 Al Brazle; 22 Cot Deal; 34 Bill Greason; 42 Harvey Haddix; 45 Gordon Jones; 31 Brooks Lawrence; 25 Royce Lint; 40 Memo Luna; 36 Stu Miller; 23 Tom Poholsky; 32 Joe Presko; 17 Vic Raschi; 31 Carl Scheib; 14 Gerry Staley; 10 Ben Wade; 26 Hal White; 39 Mel Wright	Catchers: 18 Del Rice; 15 Bill Sarni; 21 Sal Yvars; Infielders: 10 Tom Alston; 5 Steve Bilko; 1 Pete Castiglione; 28 Joe Cunningham; 4 Alex Grammas; 7 Solly Hemus; 11 Ray Jablonski; 2 Red Schoendienst; 19 Dick Schofield	Outfielders: 28 Tom Burgess; 24 Joe Frazier; 37 Peanuts Lowrey; 20 Wally Moon; 6 Stan Musial; 8 Rip Repulski	Manager: 12 Eddie Stanky; Coaches: -- Lou Kahn; 33 Bill Posedel; 29 Johnny Riddle; 35 Mike Ryba

== Player stats ==
=== Batting ===
==== Starters by position ====
Note: Pos = Position; G = Games played; AB = At bats; H = Hits; Avg. = Batting average; HR = Home runs; RBI = Runs batted in

Pos	Player	G	AB	H	Avg.	HR	RBI
C	Bill Sarni	123	380	114	.300	9	70
1B	Joe Cunningham	85	310	88	.284	11	50
2B	Red Schoendienst	148	610	192	.315	5	79
SS	Alex Grammas	142	401	106	.264	2	29
3B	Ray Jablonski	152	611	181	.296	12	104
LF	Rip Repulski	152	619	175	.283	19	79
CF	Wally Moon	151	635	193	.304	12	76
RF	Stan Musial	153	591	195	.330	35	126

==== Other batters ====
Note: G = Games played; AB = At bats; H = Hits; Avg. = Batting average; HR = Home runs; RBI = Runs batted in

Player	G	AB	H	Avg.	HR	RBI
Tom Alston	66	244	60	.246	4	34
Solly Hemus	124	214	65	.304	2	27
Del Rice	56	147	37	.252	2	16
Joe Frazier	81	88	26	.295	3	18
Peanuts Lowrey	74	61	7	.115	0	5
Sal Yvars	38	57	14	.246	2	8
Tom Burgess	17	21	1	.048	0	1
Steve Bilko	8	14	2	.143	0	1
Ducky Schofield	43	7	1	.143	0	1
Pete Castiglione	5	0	0	----	0	0

=== Pitching ===
==== Starting pitchers ====
Note: G = Games pitched; IP = Innings pitched; W = Wins; L = Losses; ERA = Earned run average; SO = Strikeouts

Player	G	IP	W	L	ERA	SO
Harvey Haddix	43	259.2	18	13	3.57	184
Vic Raschi	30	179.0	8	9	4.73	73
Gordon Jones	11	81.0	4	4	2.00	48
Ralph Beard	13	58.0	0	4	3.72	17
Memo Luna	1	0.2	0	1	27.00	0

==== Other pitchers ====
Note: G = Games pitched; IP = Innings pitched; W = Wins; L = Losses; ERA = Earned run average; SO = Strikeouts

Player	G	IP	W	L	ERA	SO
Brooks Lawrence	35	158.2	15	6	3.74	72
Gerry Staley	48	155.2	7	13	5.26	50
Tom Poholsky	25	106.0	5	7	3.06	55
Stu Miller	19	46.2	2	3	5.79	22
Carl Scheib	3	4.2	0	1	11.57	5
Bill Greason	3	4.0	0	1	13.50	2

==== Relief pitchers ====
Note: G = Games pitched; W = Wins; L = Losses; SV = Saves; ERA = Earned run average; SO = Strikeouts

Player	G	W	L	SV	ERA	SO
Al Brazle	58	5	4	8	4.16	30
Joe Presko	37	4	9	0	6.91	36
Cot Deal	33	2	3	1	6.28	25
Royce Lint	30	2	3	0	4.86	36
Ben Wade	13	0	0	0	5.48	19
Mel Wright	9	0	0	0	10.45	4
Hal White	4	0	0	0	19.80	2

== Farm system ==
Level	Team	League	Manager
AAA	Columbus Red Birds	American Association	Johnny Keane
AAA	Rochester Red Wings	International League	Harry Walker
AA	Houston Buffaloes	Texas League	Dixie Walker
A	Allentown Cardinals	Eastern League	Dutch Dorman and Harold Olt
A	Columbus Cardinals	Sally League	George Kissell
A	Omaha Cardinals	Western League	Ferrell Anderson
B	Peoria Chiefs	Illinois–Indiana–Iowa League	Whitey Kurowski
B	Lynchburg Cardinals	Piedmont League	Roland LeBlanc
C	Mexicali Eagles	Arizona–Texas League	Art Lilly
C	Fresno Cardinals	California League	Jim Hercinger
C	Hot Springs Bathers	Cotton States League	Paul Dean, Jackie Bales and Lou Lucas
C	Winnipeg Goldeyes	Northern League	Mickey O'Neil
C	Joplin Cardinals	Western Association	Bill Kelly
D	Dothan Rebels	Alabama–Florida League	Homer Ray Wilson
D	Johnson City Cardinals	Appalachian League	Lee "Pete" Peterson and Harold Contini

Level	Team	League	Manager
D	Daytona Beach Islanders	Florida State League	Ed Levy
D	Hazlehurst-Baxley Cardinals	Georgia State League	Arnie Riesgo and Bill McGhee
D	Albany Cardinals	Georgia–Florida League	Russ McGovern
D	Paducah Chiefs	KITTY League	Harold Contini and Lee "Pete" Peterson
D	Hannibal Cardinals	Mississippi–Ohio Valley League	J. C. Dunn
D	Hamilton Cardinals	PONY League	Jimmy Brown
D	Ardmore Cardinals	Sooner State League	Bennie Warren and Frank Mancuso

LEAGUE CHAMPIONS: Houston
