= 1954 Pittsburgh Pirates season =

1954 Pittsburgh Pirates
- League: National League
- Ballpark: Forbes Field
- City: Pittsburgh, Pennsylvania
- Owners: John W. Galbreath (majority shareholder); Bing Crosby, Thomas P. Johnson, Branch Rickey (minority shareholders)
- General managers: Branch Rickey
- Managers: Fred Haney
- Radio: WWSW; Rosey Rowswell, Bob Prince

The 1954 Pittsburgh Pirates season was the 73rd season of the Pittsburgh Pirates franchise; the 68th in the National League. The Pirates finished eighth and last in the league standings with a record of 53–101.

== Offseason ==
- December 1, 1953: Sonny Senerchia was drafted from the Pirates by the St. Louis Cardinals in the 1953 minor league draft.

== Regular season ==
During the season, Curt Roberts became the first black player in the history of the Pirates.

=== Season standings ===
National League
Team	W	L	Pct.	GB	Home	Road
New York Giants	97	57	.630	—	53‍–‍23	44‍–‍34
Brooklyn Dodgers	92	62	.597	5	45‍–‍32	47‍–‍30
Milwaukee Braves	89	65	.578	8	43‍–‍34	46‍–‍31
Philadelphia Phillies	75	79	.487	22	39‍–‍39	36‍–‍40
Cincinnati Redlegs	74	80	.481	23	41‍–‍36	33‍–‍44
St. Louis Cardinals	72	82	.468	25	33‍–‍44	39‍–‍38
Chicago Cubs	64	90	.416	33	40‍–‍37	24‍–‍53
Pittsburgh Pirates	53	101	.344	44	31‍–‍46	22‍–‍55

=== Record vs. opponents ===
1954 National League record Sources:
Team	BRO	CHC	CIN	MIL	NYG	PHI	PIT	STL
Brooklyn	—	15–7	16–6	10–12	9–13	13–9	15–7	14–8
Chicago	7–15	—	8–14	6–16	7–15	7–15	15–7	14–8
Cincinnati	6–16	14–8	—	10–12	7–15	14–8	15–7	8–14
Milwaukee	12–10	16–6	12–10	—	10–12	13–9	14–8	12–10
New York	13–9	15–7	15–7	12–10	—	16–6	14–8	12–10
Philadelphia	9–13	15–7	8–14	9–13	6–16	—	16–6	12–10
Pittsburgh	7–15	7–15	7–15	8–14	8–14	6–16	—	10–12
St. Louis	8–14	8–14	14–8	10–12	10–12	10–12	12–10	—

=== Game log ===
1954 Game Log: 53–101 (Home: 31–46; Away: 22–55)
April: 6–10 (Home: 4–4; Away: 2–6)

#	Date	Opponent	Score	Win	Loss	Save	Attendance	Record
1	April 13	Phillies	4–2	**Law** (1–0)	Roberts	**Hetki** (1)	32,294	1–0
2	April 14	Phillies	0–6	Simmons	**LaPalme** (0–1)	—	5,853	1–1
3	April 15	@ Dodgers	4–7	Meyer	**Surkont** (0–1)	Hughes	13,496	1–2
4	April 18	@ Phillies	0–6	Roberts	**Friend** (0–1)	—		1–3
5	April 18	@ Phillies	1–7	Simmons	**Law** (1–1)	—	9,975	1–4
6	April 19	@ Giants	7–5	**Hetki** (1–0)	Hearn	—	6,380	2–4
7	April 20	@ Giants	2–6	Antonelli	**LaPalme** (0–2)	—	6,865	2–5
8	April 21	Giants	5–4	**Surkont** (1–1)	Liddle	**Hetki** (2)	13,552	3–5
9	April 22	Giants	7–4	**O'Donnell** (1–0)	Gomez	—	3,296	4–5
10	April 23	Dodgers	5–6 (13)	Milliken	**Purkey** (0–1)	—	10,574	4–6
11	April 24	Dodgers	0–3	Erskine	**Hogue** (0–1)	—	8,671	4–7
12	April 25	Dodgers	9–3	**Law** (2–1)	Newcombe	—	8,671	5–7
13	April 25	Dodgers	2–4	Podres	**LaPalme** (0–3)	—	23,714	5–8
14	April 27	@ Redlegs	7–8	Valentine	**Surkont** (1–2)	Smith	3,634	5–9
15	April 28	@ Redlegs	4–8	Collum	**Friend** (0–2)	—	1,206	5–10
16	April 29	@ Cardinals	4–3	**Purkey** (1–1)	Haddix	**Hetki** (3)	7,603	6–10

May: 8–23 (Home: 6–12; Away: 2–11)

#	Date	Opponent	Score	Win	Loss	Save	Attendance	Record
17	May 1	@ Cardinals	4–5 (10)	Lint	**O'Donnell** (1–1)	—	6,745	6–11
18	May 2	@ Cubs	3–5	Minner	**Law** (2–2)	—	17,472	6–12
19	May 2	@ Cubs	18–10 (8)	**Friend** (1–2)	Church	**Hetki** (4)	7,636	7–12
20	May 4	@ Braves	1–6	Spahn	**Surkont** (1–3)	—	12,383	7–13
21	May 5	@ Braves	1–4	Conley	**Purkey** (1–2)	—	13,194	7–14
22	May 6	@ Braves	0–3	Burdette	**O'Donnell** (1–2)	—	11,856	7–15
23	May 8	Giants	1–2	Antonelli	**Law** (2–3)	—	7,147	7–16
24	May 9	Giants	1–5	Maglie	**Surkont** (1–4)	—	4,577	7–17
25	May 12	Cardinals	5–13	Haddix	**O'Donnell** (1–3)	Brazle	1,559	7–18
26	May 13	Braves	2–4	Nichols	**Purkey** (1–3)	—	6,090	7–19
27	May 14	Braves	3–2 (10)	**Surkont** (2–4)	Spahn	—	8,225	8–19
28	May 15	Braves	6–1	**Law** (3–3)	Buhl	—	3,366	9–19
29	May 16	Cubs	3–12	Minner	**Friend** (1–3)	—	8,225	9–20
30	May 16	Cubs	5–1	**Thies** (1–0)	Willis	—	32,807	10–20
31	May 17	Cubs	6–10	Pollet	**Purkey** (1–4)	Davis	1,420	10–21
32	May 18	Redlegs	5–6	Collum	**LaPalme** (0–4)	Smith	5,696	10–22
33	May 19	Redlegs	3–2	**Surkont** (3–4)	Valentine	—	4,476	11–22
34	May 20	Cardinals	4–17	Poholsky	**Purkey** (1–5)	—	4,902	11–23
35	May 21	@ Dodgers	2–3	Labine	**Law** (3–4)	Hughes	7,202	11–24
36	May 22	@ Dodgers	1–3	Palica	**Thies** (1–1)	Hughes	7,061	11–25
37	May 23	@ Dodgers	4–5	Roe	**Friend** (1–4)	—	7,061	11–26
38	May 23	@ Dodgers	2–6	Loes	**O'Donnell** (1–4)	Milliken	18,409	11–27
39	May 24	@ Dodgers	5–2	**Surkont** (4–4)	Erskine	—	9,386	12–27
40	May 25	@ Giants	4–21	Antonelli	**Purkey** (1–6)	—	7,206	12–28
41	May 26	@ Giants	1–2	Gomez	**Law** (3–5)	—	2,849	12–29
42	May 28	Phillies	0–4 (6)	Dickson	**Surkont** (4–5)	—	5,521	12–30
43	May 29	Phillies	3–2	**O'Donnell** (2–4)	Ridzik	—	2,525	13–30
44	May 30	Phillies	0–8	Roberts	**Littlefield** (0–1)	—	2,525	13–31
45	May 30	Phillies	7–10	Drews	**Friend** (1–5)	Konstanty	9,651	13–32
46	May 31	Giants	0–4	Gomez	**Yochim** (0–1)	—		13–33
47	May 31	Giants	4–3	**Law** (4–5)	Wilhelm	—	10,506	14–33

June: 9–15 (Home: 5–8; Away: 4–7)

#	Date	Opponent	Score	Win	Loss	Save	Attendance	Record
48	June 4	@ Braves	4–1	**Surkont** (5–5)	Nichols	—	21,582	15–33
49	June 5	@ Braves	0–7	Spahn	**O'Donnell** (2–5)	—	19,415	15–34
50	June 6	@ Braves	0–5	Wilson	**Law** (4–6)	—		15–35
51	June 6	@ Braves	6–4	**Littlefield** (1–1)	Gorin	—	34,095	16–35
52	June 8	@ Redlegs	0–5	Valentine	**O'Donnell** (2–6)	—	4,342	16–36
53	June 9	@ Redlegs	3–4	Nuxhall	**Surkont** (5–6)	—	4,813	16–37
54	June 10	@ Redlegs	0–6	Baczewski	**Thies** (1–2)	—	1,900	16–38
55	June 11	@ Cardinals	8–5	**Law** (5–6)	Presko	**Hetki** (5)	9,820	17–38
56	June 12	@ Cardinals	4–2	**Littlefield** (2–1)	Staley	—	11,365	18–38
57	June 13	@ Cardinals	0–5	Haddix	**O'Donnell** (2–7)	—	11,365	18–39
58	June 13	@ Cardinals	3–5	Miller	**LaPalme** (0–5)	—	16,648	18–40
59	June 14	Cubs	5–6	Davis	**Surkont** (5–7)	Minner	6,462	18–41
60	June 18	Braves	2–1	**Law** (6–6)	Spahn	—	8,859	19–41
61	June 19	Braves	2–11	Jolly	**Littlefield** (2–2)	—	3,961	19–42
62	June 20	Braves	2–1 (10)	**Surkont** (6–7)	Burdette	—	8,859	20–42
63	June 20	Braves	6–3	**Friend** (2–5)	Buhl	**Law** (1)	10,236	21–42
64	June 23	Cardinals	1–7	Haddix	**Littlefield** (2–3)	—	9,301	21–43
65	June 24	Cardinals	1–5	Lawrence	**Law** (6–7)	—	2,637	21–44
66	June 25	Redlegs	4–8	Fowler	**Surkont** (6–8)	Smith	6,327	21–45
67	June 26	Redlegs	4–3	**Friend** (3–5)	Baczewski	—	2,551	22–45
68	June 27	Redlegs	0–9	Valentine	**Law** (6–8)	—		22–46
69	June 27	Redlegs	4–3	**Hetki** (2–0)	Podbielan	—	7,717	23–46
70	June 29	Phillies	0–4	Wehmeier	**Surkont** (6–9)	—	5,088	23–47
71	June 30	Phillies	0–8	Roberts	**Law** (6–9)	—	4,209	23–48

July: 10–21 (Home: 4–8; Away: 6–13)

#	Date	Opponent	Score	Win	Loss	Save	Attendance	Record
72	July 2	Giants	5–9	Wilhelm	**Friend** (3–6)	Maglie	9,603	23–49
73	July 3	Giants	6–4	**Littlefield** (3–3)	Hearn	**O'Donnell** (1)	3,488	24–49
74	July 4	Giants	2–9	Liddle	**Surkont** (6–10)	McCall	3,488	24–50
75	July 4	Giants	7–6	**LaPalme** (1–5)	Grissom	**Hetki** (6)	12,818	25–50
76	July 5	Dodgers	6–8	Wade	**Law** (6–10)	Hughes	9,603	25–51
77	July 5	Dodgers	2–7	Loes	**Thies** (1–3)	—	16,905	25–52
78	July 6	@ Phillies	0–3	Simmons	**Friend** (3–7)	—	3,967	25–53
79	July 9	@ Giants	3–6	Antonelli	**LaPalme** (1–6)	—	12,423	25–54
80	July 10	@ Giants	10–7	**O'Donnell** (3–7)	Wilhelm	—	9,744	26–54
81	July 11	@ Giants	7–13	Maglie	**Law** (6–11)	Grissom	9,744	26–55
82	July 11	@ Giants	5–1	**Littlefield** (4–3)	Hearn	—	21,504	27–55
83	July 15	@ Cubs	2–9	Minner	**Surkont** (6–11)	—	5,900	27–56
84	July 15	@ Cubs	0–3	Hacker	**O'Donnell** (3–8)	Tremel	10,855	27–57
85	July 16	@ Cubs	2–3	Rush	**Hetki** (2–1)	—	4,586	27–58
86	July 17	@ Cubs	3–11	Davis	**Law** (6–12)	Tremel	4,586	27–59
87	July 17	@ Cubs	6–2	**Purkey** (2–6)	Klippstein	**O'Donnell** (2)	10,842	28–59
88	July 18	@ Braves	1–4	Spahn	**Littlefield** (4–4)	Johnson	25,074	28–60
89	July 18	@ Braves	7–5	**Friend** (4–7)	Nichols	—	29,371	29–60
90	July 19	@ Braves	1–4	Wilson	**Surkont** (6–12)	—	23,281	29–61
91	July 21	@ Cardinals	12–13	Lawrence	**O'Donnell** (3–9)	Haddix	6,623	29–62
92	July 22	@ Cardinals	2–3 (14)	Staley	**Friend** (4–8)	—	7,059	29–63
93	July 23	@ Redlegs	7–4	**Littlefield** (5–4)	Nuxhall	—	7,682	30–63
94	July 24	@ Redlegs	3–5	Fowler	**Surkont** (6–13)	Smith	3,383	30–64
95	July 25	@ Redlegs	4–2	**LaPalme** (2–6)	Perkowski	—		31–64
96	July 25	@ Redlegs	2–3	Judson	**Friend** (4–9)	Smith	13,514	31–65
97	July 26	Braves	1–3	Conley	**Purkey** (2–7)	—	6,850	31–66
98	July 28	Braves	4–6	Burdette	**Littlefield** (5–5)	Jolly	6,728	31–67
99	July 29	Braves	3–5 (10)	Nichols	**Hetki** (2–2)	—	2,259	31–68
100	July 30	Cubs	8–6	**Purkey** (3–7)	Minner	**Hetki** (7)	6,728	32–68
101	July 30	Cubs	5–8	Pollet	**Surkont** (6–14)	Jeffcoat	7,754	32–69
102	July 31	Cubs	5–3	**LaPalme** (3–6)	Hacker	**Friend** (1)	2,688	33–69

August: 13–17 (Home: 7–6; Away: 6–11)

#	Date	Opponent	Score	Win	Loss	Save	Attendance	Record
103	August 1	Cubs	2–0	**Littlefield** (6–5)	Davis	—	2,688	34–69
104	August 1	Cubs	2–12	Cole	**Pepper** (0–1)	—	7,281	34–70
105	August 3	Redlegs	2–7	Nuxhall	**Friend** (4–10)	—	4,671	34–71
106	August 4	Redlegs	4–3	**Law** (7–12)	Smith	—	3,778	35–71
107	August 6	Cardinals	7–3	**Littlefield** (7–5)	Poholsky	—	2,688	36–71
108	August 6	Cardinals	6–5	**Hetki** (3–2)	Lawrence	—	8,624	37–71
109	August 7	Cardinals	6–8	Presko	**Purkey** (3–8)	Brazle	3,846	37–72
110	August 8	Cardinals	12–4	**LaPalme** (4–6)	Haddix	—	8,624	38–72
111	August 8	Cardinals	5–3	**Surkont** (7–14)	Staley	—	10,790	39–72
112	August 10	Giants	1–2	Antonelli	**Littlefield** (7–6)	Grissom	9,945	39–73
113	August 13	@ Phillies	9–5	**Friend** (5–10)	Roberts	—	24,536	40–73
114	August 13	@ Phillies	5–0	**Thies** (2–3)	Wehmeier	—	8,804	41–73
115	August 14	@ Phillies	8–4	**Law** (8–12)	Simmons	—	2,865	42–73
116	August 15	@ Phillies	9–6	**Littlefield** (8–6)	Dickson	**Hetki** (8)	2,865	43–73
117	August 15	@ Phillies	6–7	Roberts	**Hetki** (3–3)	—	4,773	43–74
118	August 17	Dodgers	4–2	**Surkont** (8–14)	Podres	—	20,102	44–74
119	August 18	Dodgers	2–3	Erskine	**Thies** (2–4)	Hughes	18,797	44–75
120	August 19	Dodgers	5–7	Newcombe	**Law** (8–13)	Hughes	9,299	44–76
121	August 20	@ Giants	0–4	Liddle	**Littlefield** (8–7)	—	8,985	44–77
122	August 22	@ Giants	4–5	McCall	**LaPalme** (4–7)	—		44–78
123	August 22	@ Giants	3–5	Wilhelm	**Surkont** (8–15)	—	22,702	44–79
124	August 24	@ Cardinals	8–7	**Littlefield** (9–7)	Haddix	**Law** (2)	8,718	45–79
125	August 25	@ Cardinals	0–13	Jones	**Thies** (2–5)	—	6,826	45–80
126	August 26	@ Cardinals	2–1	**Pepper** (1–1)	Beard	**Law** (3)	7,094	46–80
127	August 27	@ Redlegs	2–3	Nuxhall	**Surkont** (8–16)	—	5,227	46–81
128	August 28	@ Redlegs	1–2	Valentine	**LaPalme** (4–8)	—	2,995	46–82
129	August 29	@ Cubs	4–7	Jeffcoat	**Littlefield** (9–8)	—	5,790	46–83
130	August 29	@ Cubs	1–4	Davis	**Hetki** (3–4)	—	15,318	46–84
131	August 31	@ Cubs	2–14	Pollet	**Pepper** (1–2)	—	15,318	46–85
132	August 31	@ Cubs	3–7	Rush	**Thies** (2–6)	Jeffcoat	18,217	46–86

September: 7–15 (Home: 5–8; Away: 2–7)

#	Date	Opponent	Score	Win	Loss	Save	Attendance	Record
133	September 1	@ Braves	1–3	Spahn	**Surkont** (8–17)	—	40,494	46–87
134	September 3	Phillies	1–7	Simmons	**Friend** (5–11)	—	10,790	46–88
135	September 3	Phillies	2–10	Ridzik	**Littlefield** (9–9)	—	5,302	46–89
136	September 5	Phillies	5–12	Wehmeier	**Pepper** (1–3)	—	4,645	46–90
137	September 6	@ Dodgers	9–6 (12)	**Law** (9–13)	Loes	—	26,349	47–90
138	September 6	@ Dodgers	9–7	**Thies** (3–6)	Newcombe	**Friend** (2)	21,561	48–90
139	September 8	Braves	2–5	Spahn	**Littlefield** (9–10)	—	2,516	48–91
140	September 10	Cardinals	3–2	**Hetki** (4–4)	Staley	—	2,615	49–91
141	September 11	Cardinals	2–7	Poholsky	**Pepper** (1–4)	—	1,851	49–92
142	September 12	Redlegs	5–11	Nuxhall	**LaPalme** (4–9)	—		49–93
143	September 12	Redlegs	2–13	Lane	**Thies** (3–7)	Ross	5,672	49–94
144	September 13	Redlegs	6–5	**Littlefield** (10–10)	Judson	—	1,148	50–94
145	September 14	Cubs	2–9	Rush	**Thies** (3–8)	—	1,851	50–95
146	September 14	Cubs	4–0	**Friend** (6–11)	Minner	—	2,361	51–95
147	September 17	Dodgers	9–1	**Surkont** (9–17)	Loes	—	6,198	52–95
148	September 19	Dodgers	1–0	**Friend** (7–11)	Meyer	—	21,308	53–95
149	September 22	@ Phillies	1–12	Simmons	**Pepper** (1–5)	—	5,157	53–96
150	September 22	@ Phillies	1–5	Roberts	**Littlefield** (10–11)	—	2,837	53–97
151	September 23	@ Phillies	2–4	Wehmeier	**LaPalme** (4–10)	—	936	53–98
152	September 24	@ Dodgers	5–6	Erskine	**Surkont** (9–18)	Hughes	751	53–99
153	September 25	@ Dodgers	5–10	Meyer	**Friend** (7–12)	Labine	4,597	53–100
154	September 26	@ Dodgers	0–1	Spooner	**Thies** (3–9)	—	9,344	53–101

Legend: = Win = Loss
Bold = Pirates team member

=== Notable transactions ===
- June 14, 1954: Hal Rice was traded by the Pirates to the Chicago Cubs for Luis Márquez.

=== Roster ===
1954 Pittsburgh Pirates
**Roster**
**Pitchers**: 19 Bob Friend; 29 Johnny Hetki; 25 Cal Hogue; 30 Nellie King; 24 Paul LaPalme; 32 Vern Law; 27 Dick Littlefield; 23 George O'Donnell; 00 Joe Page; 18 Laurin Pepper; 34 Bob Purkey; 35 Max Surkont; 39 Jake Thies; 38 Len Yochim	**Catchers**: 11 Toby Atwell; 23,28 Walker Cooper; 46 Bill Hall; 9 Nick Koback; 20 Jim Mangan; 10 Jack Shepard; **Infielders**: 8 Gair Allie; 12 Dick Cole; 31 Vic Janowicz; 13 Eddie Pellagrini; 7 Curt Roberts; 3 Bob Skinner; 6 Dick Smith; 5 Preston Ward	**Outfielders**: 18 Cal Abrams; 4 Sid Gordon; 17 Dick Hall; 26 Gail Henley; 20 Sam Jethroe; 14 Jerry Lynch; 44 Luis Márquez; 44 Hal Rice; 15 Frank Thomas	**Manager**: 2 Fred Haney; **Coaches**: 40 John Fitzpatrick; 43 Sam Narron; 41 Clyde Sukeforth

== Player stats ==
=== Batting ===
==== Starters by position ====
Note: Pos = Position; G = Games played; AB = At bats; H = Hits; Avg. = Batting average; HR = Home runs; RBI = Runs batted in

Pos	Player	G	AB	H	Avg.	HR	RBI
C	Toby Atwell	96	287	83	.289	3	26
1B	Bob Skinner	132	470	117	.249	8	46
2B	Curt Roberts	134	496	115	.232	1	36
SS	Gair Allie	121	418	83	.199	3	30
3B	Dick Cole	138	486	131	.270	1	40
LF	Jerry Lynch	98	284	68	.239	8	36
CF	Frank Thomas	153	577	172	.298	23	94
RF	Sid Gordon	131	363	111	.306	12	49

==== Other batters ====
Note: G = Games played; AB = At bats; H = Hits; Avg. = Batting average; HR = Home runs; RBI = Runs batted in

Player	G	AB	H	Avg.	HR	RBI
Preston Ward	117	360	97	.269	7	48
Dick Hall	112	310	74	.239	2	27
Jack Shepard	82	227	69	.304	3	22
Eddie Pellagrini	73	125	27	.216	0	16
Hal Rice	28	81	14	.173	1	9
Vic Janowicz	41	73	11	.151	0	2
Cal Abrams	17	42	6	.143	0	2
Dick Smith	12	31	3	.097	0	0
Gail Henley	14	30	9	.300	1	2
Jim Mangan	14	26	5	.192	0	2
Walker Cooper	14	15	3	.200	0	1
Nick Koback	4	10	0	.000	0	0
Luis Márquez	14	9	1	.111	0	0
Bill Hall	5	7	0	.000	0	0
Sam Jethroe	2	1	0	.000	0	0

=== Pitching ===
==== Starting pitchers ====
Note: G = Games pitched; IP = Innings pitched; W = Wins; L = Losses; ERA = Earned run average; SO = Strikeouts

Player	G	IP	W	L	ERA	SO
Max Surkont	33	208.1	9	18	4.41	78
Dick Littlefield	23	155.0	10	11	3.60	92

==== Other pitchers ====
Note: G = Games pitched; IP = Innings pitched; W = Wins; L = Losses; ERA = Earned run average; SO = Strikeouts

Player	G	IP	W	L	ERA	SO
Bob Friend	35	170.1	7	12	5.07	73
Vern Law	39	161.2	9	13	5.51	57
Bob Purkey	36	131.1	3	8	5.07	38
Jake Thies	33	130.1	3	9	3.87	57
Paul LaPalme	33	120.2	4	10	5.52	57
George O'Donnell	21	87.1	3	9	4.53	8
Laurin Pepper	14	50.2	1	5	7.99	17
Cal Hogue	3	11.0	0	1	4.91	7

==== Relief pitchers ====
Note: G = Games pitched; W = Wins; L = Losses; SV = Saves; ERA = Earned run average; SO = Strikeouts

Player	G	W	L	SV	ERA	SO
Johnny Hetki	58	4	4	9	4.99	27
Len Yochim	10	0	1	0	7.32	7
Joe Page	7	0	0	0	11.17	4
Nellie King	4	0	0	0	5.14	3

== Farm system ==
Level	Team	League	Manager
Open	Hollywood Stars	Pacific Coast League	Bobby Bragan
AA	New Orleans Pelicans	Southern Association	Danny Murtaugh
A	Williamsport Grays	Eastern League	Larry Shepard
A	Denver Bears	Western League	Andy Cohen
B	Waco Pirates	Big State League	Jack Paepke
B	Burlington-Graham Pirates	Carolina League	Stan Wentzel
C	Billings Mustangs	Pioneer League	Cliff Dapper
C	St. Jean Canadiens	Provincial League	George Detore and Steve Mizerak
C	Hutchinson Elks	Western Association	George Genovese and Lamar Dorton
D	Dublin Irish	Georgia State League	George Kinnamon
D	Brunswick Pirates	Georgia–Florida League	Frank Oceak
D	Clinton Pirates	Mississippi–Ohio Valley League	Robert Clark

LEAGUE CHAMPIONS: Waco
