= 1954 Brooklyn Dodgers season =

1954 Brooklyn Dodgers
- League: National League
- Ballpark: Ebbets Field
- City: Brooklyn, New York
- Record: 92–62 (.597)
- League place: 2nd
- Owners: Walter O'Malley, James & Dearie Mulvey, Mary Louise Smith
- President: Walter O'Malley
- General managers: Buzzie Bavasi
- Managers: Walter Alston
- Television: WOR-TV
- Radio: WMGM; Vin Scully, Connie Desmond, André Baruch

The 1954 Brooklyn Dodgers season was the 65th season for the Brooklyn Dodgers franchise in the MLB. It was the first season for new manager Walter Alston, who replaced Chuck Dressen, who had been fired during a contract dispute. Alston led the team to a 92–62 record, finishing five games behind the league champion New York Giants.

In addition to Alston, the 1954 Dodgers had two other future Hall of Fame managers on their roster in pitcher Tommy Lasorda and outfielder Dick Williams. First baseman Gil Hodges and reserve infielder Don Zimmer would also go on to successful managerial careers.

== Offseason ==
- October 1, 1954: Rocky Nelson was traded by the Dodgers to the Cleveland Indians for Bill Abernathie and cash.
- March 28, 1954: Bobby Morgan was traded by the Dodgers to the Philadelphia Phillies for Dick Young and cash.

== Regular season ==
- On July 31, 1954, Joe Adcock hit four home runs off four different Brooklyn Dodgers pitchers, becoming the seventh player in major league history to hit four home runs in one game. Additionally, Adcock hit a double, setting a major league record of 18 total bases.
- September 22, 1954: In a game against the New York Giants, Karl Spooner struck out 15 batters in his very first game, setting a Major League record. J. R. Richard would tie the record in 1971.

=== Season standings ===
National League
Team	W	L	Pct.	GB	Home	Road
New York Giants	97	57	.630	—	53‍–‍23	44‍–‍34
Brooklyn Dodgers	92	62	.597	5	45‍–‍32	47‍–‍30
Milwaukee Braves	89	65	.578	8	43‍–‍34	46‍–‍31
Philadelphia Phillies	75	79	.487	22	39‍–‍39	36‍–‍40
Cincinnati Redlegs	74	80	.481	23	41‍–‍36	33‍–‍44
St. Louis Cardinals	72	82	.468	25	33‍–‍44	39‍–‍38
Chicago Cubs	64	90	.416	33	40‍–‍37	24‍–‍53
Pittsburgh Pirates	53	101	.344	44	31‍–‍46	22‍–‍55

=== Record vs. opponents ===
1954 National League record Sources:
Team	BRO	CHC	CIN	MIL	NYG	PHI	PIT	STL
Brooklyn	—	15–7	16–6	10–12	9–13	13–9	15–7	14–8
Chicago	7–15	—	8–14	6–16	7–15	7–15	15–7	14–8
Cincinnati	6–16	14–8	—	10–12	7–15	14–8	15–7	8–14
Milwaukee	12–10	16–6	12–10	—	10–12	13–9	14–8	12–10
New York	13–9	15–7	15–7	12–10	—	16–6	14–8	12–10
Philadelphia	9–13	15–7	8–14	9–13	6–16	—	16–6	12–10
Pittsburgh	7–15	7–15	7–15	8–14	8–14	6–16	—	10–12
St. Louis	8–14	8–14	14–8	10–12	10–12	10–12	12–10	—

=== Opening Day Lineup ===
Opening Day Lineup
#	Name	Position
19	Jim Gilliam	2B
1	Pee Wee Reese	SS
4	Duke Snider	CF
42	Jackie Robinson	LF
39	Roy Campanella	C
14	Gil Hodges	1B
6	Carl Furillo	RF
3	Billy Cox	3B
17	Carl Erskine	P

=== Notable transactions ===
- May 4, 1954: Art Ceccarelli was purchased from the Dodgers by the New York Yankees.
- May 11, 1954: Rocky Nelson was purchased by the Dodgers from the Cleveland Indians.
- June 9, 1954: Wayne Belardi was traded by the Dodgers to the Detroit Tigers for Ernie Nevel, Johnny Bucha, Chuck Kress and cash.

=== Roster ===
1954 Brooklyn Dodgers
Roster
Pitchers: 49 Joe Black; 38 Bob Darnell; 17 Carl Erskine; 18 Jim Hughes; 41 Clem Labine; 27,29 Tommy Lasorda; 30 Billy Loes; 34 Russ Meyer; 25 Bob Milliken; 36 Don Newcombe; 12 Erv Palica; 45 Johnny Podres; 28 Preacher Roe; 48 Karl Spooner; 46 Ben Wade; 27,35 Pete Wojey	Catchers: 39 Roy Campanella; 21 Tim Thompson; 10 Rube Walker; Infielders: 5 Wayne Belardi; 3 Billy Cox; 19 Jim Gilliam; 43 Don Hoak; 14 Gil Hodges; 5 Chuck Kress; 1 Pee Wee Reese; 23 Don Zimmer	Outfielders: 15 Sandy Amorós; 6 Carl Furillo; 40 Walt Moryn; 42 Jackie Robinson; 8 George Shuba; 4 Duke Snider; 29 Don Thompson; 38 Dick Williams	Manager: 24 Walter Alston; Coaches: 22 Billy Herman; 33 Ted Lyons; 31 Jake Pitler

== Player stats ==
= Indicates team leader

= Indicates league leader

=== Batting ===
==== Starters by position ====
Note: Pos = Position; G = Games played; AB = At bats; H = Hits; Avg. = Batting average; HR = Home runs; RBI = Runs batted in

Pos	Player	G	AB	H	Avg.	HR	RBI
C	Roy Campanella	111	397	82	.207	19	51
1B	Gil Hodges	154	579	176	.304	42	130
2B	Jim Gilliam	146	607	171	.282	13	52
SS	Pee Wee Reese	141	554	171	.309	10	69
3B	Don Hoak	88	261	64	.245	7	26
LF	Sandy Amorós	79	263	72	.274	9	34
CF	Duke Snider	149	584	199	.341	40	130
RF	Carl Furillo	150	547	161	.294	19	96

==== Other batters ====
Note: G = Games played; AB = At bats; H = Hits; Avg. = Batting average; HR = Home runs; RBI = Runs batted in

Player	G	AB	H	Avg.	HR	RBI
Jackie Robinson	124	386	120	.311	15	59
Billy Cox	77	226	53	.235	2	17
Rube Walker	50	155	28	.181	5	23
Walt Moryn	48	91	25	.275	2	14
George Shuba	45	65	10	.154	2	10
Dick Williams	16	34	5	.147	1	2
Don Zimmer	24	33	6	.182	0	0
Don Thompson	34	25	1	.040	0	1
Tim Thompson	10	13	2	.154	0	1
Chuck Kress	13	12	1	.083	0	2
Wayne Belardi	11	9	2	.222	0	1

=== Pitching ===
==== Starting pitchers ====
Note: G = Games pitched; IP = Innings pitched; W = Wins; L = Losses; ERA = Earned run average; SO = Strikeouts

Player	G	IP	W	L	ERA	SO
Carl Erskine	38	260.1	18	15	4.15	166
Russ Meyer	36	180.1	11	6	3.99	70
Johnny Podres	29	151.2	11	7	4.27	79
Billy Loes	28	147.2	13	5	4.14	97
Don Newcombe	29	144.1	9	8	4.55	82
Karl Spooner	2	18.0	2	0	0.00	27

==== Other pitchers ====
Note: G = Games pitched; IP = Innings pitched; W = Wins; L = Losses; ERA = Earned run average; SO = Strikeouts

Player	G	IP	W	L	ERA	SO
Erv Palica	25	67.2	3	3	5.32	25
Preacher Roe	15	63.0	3	4	5.00	31
Bob Milliken	24	62.2	5	2	4.02	25

==== Relief pitchers ====
Note: G = Games pitched; W = Wins; L = Losses; SV = Saves; ERA = Earned run average; SO = Strikeouts

Player	G	W	L	SV	ERA	SO
Jim Hughes	60	8	4	24	3.22	58
Clem Labine	47	7	6	4	4.15	43
Ben Wade	23	1	1	3	8.20	25
Pete Wojey	14	1	1	1	3.25	21
Bob Darnell	6	0	0	0	3.14	5
Joe Black	5	0	0	0	11.57	3
Tommy Lasorda	4	0	0	0	5.00	5

== Awards and honors ==
- 1954 Major League Baseball All-Star Game
  - Roy Campanella starter
  - Jackie Robinson starter
  - Duke Snider starter
  - Carl Erskine reserve
  - Gil Hodges reserve
  - Pee Wee Reese reserve
- TSN Major League All-Star Team
  - Duke Snider

== Farm system ==
Level	Team	League	Manager
AAA	Montreal Royals	International League	Max Macon
AAA	St. Paul Saints	American Association	Clay Bryant
AA	Ft. Worth Cats	Texas League	Al Vincent
AA	Mobile Bears	Southern Association	Stan Wasiak; Greg Mulleavy
A	Elmira Pioneers	Eastern League	Tommy Holmes
A	Pueblo Dodgers	Western League	Goldie Holt
B	Asheville Tourists	Tri-State League	Ray Hathaway
B	Miami Sun Sox	Florida International League	Doc Alexson
B	Newport News Dodgers	Piedmont League	George Scherger
C	Bakersfield Indians	California League	Ray Perry
C	Great Falls Electrics	Pioneer League	Lou Rochelli
D	Hornell Dodgers	Pennsylvania–Ontario–New York League	John Angelone; Doc Alexson
D	Shawnee Hawks	Sooner State League	Jack Banta
D	Thomasville Dodgers	Georgia–Florida League	Boyd Bartley; John Angelone
D	Union City Dodgers	Kentucky–Illinois–Tennessee League	Earl Naylor

LEAGUE CHAMPIONS: Newport News, Great Falls
