= 1954 Milwaukee Braves season =

Major League Baseball season

1954 Milwaukee Braves
- League: National League
- Ballpark: Milwaukee County Stadium
- City: Milwaukee, Wisconsin
- Record: 89–65 (.578)
- League place: 3rd
- Owners: Louis R. Perini
- General managers: John J. Quinn
- Managers: Charlie Grimm
- Radio: WEMP; WTMJ (Earl Gillespie, Blaine Walsh)

The 1954 Milwaukee Braves season was the second in Milwaukee and the 84th overall season of the franchise.

== Offseason ==
- October 6, 1953: Art Fowler was acquired from the Braves by the Cincinnati Redlegs as part of a conditional deal.
- December 7, 1953: Catfish Metkovich was purchased by the Braves from the Chicago Cubs.

== Regular season ==
- July 31, 1954: Joe Adcock hit four home runs in one game. The four home runs were hit off four different Brooklyn Dodgers pitchers, becoming the seventh player in major league history to hit four home runs in one game. Additionally, Adcock hit a double, setting a major league record of 18 total bases.
- August 1, 1954: Eddie Mathews hit the 100th home run of his career.

=== Season standings ===
National League
Team	W	L	Pct.	GB	Home	Road
New York Giants	97	57	.630	—	53‍–‍23	44‍–‍34
Brooklyn Dodgers	92	62	.597	5	45‍–‍32	47‍–‍30
Milwaukee Braves	89	65	.578	8	43‍–‍34	46‍–‍31
Philadelphia Phillies	75	79	.487	22	39‍–‍39	36‍–‍40
Cincinnati Redlegs	74	80	.481	23	41‍–‍36	33‍–‍44
St. Louis Cardinals	72	82	.468	25	33‍–‍44	39‍–‍38
Chicago Cubs	64	90	.416	33	40‍–‍37	24‍–‍53
Pittsburgh Pirates	53	101	.344	44	31‍–‍46	22‍–‍55

=== Record vs. opponents ===
1954 National League record Sources:
Team	BRO	CHC	CIN	MIL	NYG	PHI	PIT	STL
Brooklyn	—	15–7	16–6	10–12	9–13	13–9	15–7	14–8
Chicago	7–15	—	8–14	6–16	7–15	7–15	15–7	14–8
Cincinnati	6–16	14–8	—	10–12	7–15	14–8	15–7	8–14
Milwaukee	12–10	16–6	12–10	—	10–12	13–9	14–8	12–10
New York	13–9	15–7	15–7	12–10	—	16–6	14–8	12–10
Philadelphia	9–13	15–7	8–14	9–13	6–16	—	16–6	12–10
Pittsburgh	7–15	7–15	7–15	8–14	8–14	6–16	—	10–12
St. Louis	8–14	8–14	14–8	10–12	10–12	10–12	12–10	—

=== Notable transactions ===
- June 1954: Lee Maye was signed as an amateur free agent by the Braves.
- June 14, 1954: Sibby Sisti was released by the Braves.

=== Roster ===
1954 Milwaukee Braves
Roster
Pitchers: 10 Bob Buhl; 33 Lew Burdette; 22 Gene Conley; 20 Ray Crone; 15 Charlie Gorin; 47 Joey Jay; 32 Ernie Johnson; 16 Dave Jolly; 20 Dave Koslo; 17 Chet Nichols Jr.; 11 Phil Paine; 21 Warren Spahn; 19 Jim Wilson	Catchers: 8,42 Sam Calderone; 1 Del Crandall; 24 Charlie White; Infielders: 9 Joe Adcock; 6 Jack Dittmer; 23 Johnny Logan; 41 Eddie Mathews; 27 Catfish Metkovich; 4 Danny O'Connell; 14 Mel Roach; 30 Roy Smalley Jr.	Outfielders: 5 Hank Aaron; 38 Bill Bruton; 48 Andy Pafko; 3 Jim Pendleton; 7 Billy Queen; 34 Bobby Thomson; Other batters: 13 Sibby Sisti	Manager: 40 Charlie Grimm; Coaches: 28 Johnny Cooney; 35 Bob Keely; 13 Sibby Sisti; 31 Bucky Walters

== Player stats ==
=== Batting ===
==== Starters by position ====
Note: Pos = Position; G = Games played; AB = At bats; H = Hits; Avg. = Batting average; HR = Home runs; RBI = Runs batted in

Pos	Player	G	AB	H	Avg.	HR	RBI
C	Del Crandall	138	463	112	.242	21	64
1B	Joe Adcock	133	500	154	.308	23	87
2B	Danny O'Connell	146	541	151	.279	2	37
SS	Johnny Logan	154	560	154	.275	8	66
3B	Eddie Mathews	138	476	138	.290	40	103
LF	Hank Aaron	122	468	131	.280	13	69
CF	Bill Bruton	142	567	161	.284	4	30
RF	Andy Pafko	138	510	146	.286	14	69

==== Other batters ====
Note: G = Games played; AB = At bats; H = Hits; Avg. = Batting average; HR = Home runs; RBI = Runs batted in

Player	G	AB	H	Avg.	HR	RBI
Jack Dittmer	66	192	47	.245	6	20
Jim Pendleton	71	173	38	.220	1	16
Catfish Metkovich	68	123	34	.276	1	15
Bobby Thomson	43	99	23	.232	2	15
Charlie White	50	93	22	.237	1	8
Roy Smalley Jr.	25	36	8	.222	1	7
Sam Calderone	22	29	11	.379	0	5
Mel Roach	3	4	0	.000	0	0
Billy Queen	3	2	0	.000	0	0
Sibby Sisti	9	0	0	----	0	0

=== Pitching ===
==== Starting pitchers ====
Note: G = Games pitched; IP = Innings pitched; W = Wins; L = Losses; ERA = Earned run average; SO = Strikeouts

Player	G	IP	W	L	ERA	SO
Warren Spahn	39	283.1	21	12	3.14	136
Lew Burdette	38	238.0	15	14	2.76	79
Gene Conley	28	194.1	14	9	2.96	113
Jim Wilson	27	127.2	8	2	3.52	52

==== Other pitchers ====
Note: G = Games pitched; IP = Innings pitched; W = Wins; L = Losses; ERA = Earned run average; SO = Strikeouts

Player	G	IP	W	L	ERA	SO
Chet Nichols Jr.	35	122.1	9	11	4.41	55
Bob Buhl	31	110.1	2	7	4.00	57

==== Relief pitchers ====
Note: G = Games pitched; W = Wins; L = Losses; SV = Saves; ERA = Earned run average; SO = Strikeouts

Player	G	W	L	SV	ERA	SO
Dave Jolly	47	11	6	10	2.43	62
Ernie Johnson	40	5	2	2	2.81	68
Ray Crone	19	1	0	1	2.02	33
Joey Jay	15	1	0	0	6.50	13
Dave Koslo	12	1	1	1	3.12	7
Phil Paine	11	1	0	0	3.86	11
Charlie Gorin	5	0	1	0	1.86	12

== Farm system ==
Level	Team	League	Manager
AAA	Toledo Sox	American Association	George Selkirk
AA	Atlanta Crackers	Southern Association	Whit Wyatt
A	Jacksonville Braves	Sally League	Ben Geraghty
A	Lincoln Chiefs	Western League	Whitey Wietelmann and Glenn McQuillen
B	Corpus Christi Clippers	Big State League	Billy Capps
B	Miami Beach/Greater Miami Flamingos	Florida International League	Pepper Martin
B	Evansville Braves	Illinois–Indiana–Iowa League	Bob Coleman
C	Eau Claire Braves	Northern League	Charlie Root
C	Quebec Braves	Provincial League	George McQuinn
D	Wellsville Braves	PONY League	Ted Sepkowski
D	Lawton Braves	Sooner State League	Travis Jackson

LEAGUE CHAMPIONS: Atlanta, Quebec, Lawton
Miami Beach franchise transferred to Miami, May 20, 1954; Florida International League folded, July 27
