= Memo Luna =

Mexican baseball player (1930–2021)

Guillermo "Memo" Luna
- Pitcher
- Born: June 25, 1930; Mexico City, Federal District, Mexico
- Died: November 9, 2021 (aged 91); Los Mochis, Sinaloa, Mexico
- Batted: Left Threw: Left

MLB debut
- April 20, 1954, for the St. Louis Cardinals

Last MLB appearance
- April 20, 1954, for the St. Louis Cardinals

MLB statistics
- Win–loss record: 0–1
- Earned run average: 27.00
- Strikeouts: 0
- Innings pitched: 2/3
- Stats at Baseball Reference

Teams
- St. Louis Cardinals (1954)

Member of the Mexican Professional

Baseball Hall of Fame
- Induction: 1987

Guillermo "Memo" Luna Romero (June 25, 1930 – November 9, 2021) was a Mexican professional baseball player, a left-handed pitcher whose career extended from 1949 through 1961 and who pitched one game of Major League Baseball for the 1954 St. Louis Cardinals. Luna was born in Mexico City. At the height of his career, he stood 6 feet (1.83 m) tall and weighed 168 pounds (76 kg).

Luna had two seasons in the minor leagues. In 1951, he led the Class C Southwest International League in strikeouts (318) and earned run average (2.52) while posting a 26–13 won–lost record for the sixth-place Tijuana Potros. Two years later, Luna led the Open-Classification Pacific Coast League in earned run average (2.67), as he won 17 of 29 decisions for the 1953 San Diego Padres. That performance earned him a trial with the 1954 Cardinals.

Luna started the Redbirds' sixth contest of the season, at Busch Stadium against the Cincinnati Redlegs, but he faced only six batters in the top of the first inning. He walked Bobby Adams; then Roy McMillan hit a double, with Adams scoring on an error by Rip Repulski, which also allowed McMillan to advance to third base. Luna retired Gus Bell on a fly ball, then got another out when Jim Greengrass hit a sacrifice fly to score McMillan. With two outs and the bases empty, however, Luna gave up another double, to Ted Kluszewski, and another walk, to Johnny Temple. He then was replaced by relief pitcher Mel Wright, who prevented further scoring. The two runs allowed by Luna, however, were enough to saddle him with the loss in an eventual 13–6 Cincinnati win. (The Redlegs' winning pitcher was Joe Nuxhall).

Luna was sent down to the Triple-A Rochester Red Wings after that one appearance, and never returned to the Majors. In 1988 he was selected to the Mexican Professional Baseball Hall of Fame.
