= Bob Greenwood (baseball) =

Mexican baseball player (1928-1994)

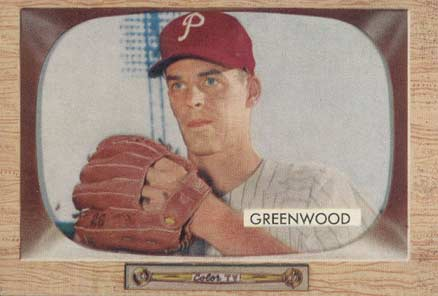
- Pitcher
- Born: March 13, 1928; Cananea, Sonora, Mexico
- Died: September 1, 1994 (aged 66); Hayward, California, U.S.
- Batted: Right Threw: Right

MLB debut
- April 21, 1954, for the Philadelphia Phillies

Last MLB appearance
- April 21, 1955, for the Philadelphia Phillies

MLB statistics
- Win–loss record: 1–2
- Earned run average: 3.92
- Strikeouts: 9
- Stats at Baseball Reference

Teams
- Philadelphia Phillies (1954–1955)

Career highlights and awards
- 8th major-league player to have been born in Mexico.

Robert Chandler Greenwood (March 13, 1928 – September 1, 1994), nicknamed "Greenie", was a Mexican professional baseball right-handed pitcher, who played in Major League Baseball (MLB) for the Philadelphia Phillies, during the 1954 and 1955 seasons. He was listed as 6 feet 5 inches (1.96 m) tall and 200 pounds (91 kg). Greenwood attended Oakland Technical High School and Saint Mary's College of California.

A native of Cananea, Sonora, Greenwood's pro baseball career lasted for 11 seasons (1949–1956; 1958–1960) and included 12 big league games pitched. He posted a 1–2 won–lost record and a 3.92 earned run average (ERA) in 39 MLB innings pitched, allowing 35 hits, and 18 bases on balls, with nine strikeouts. Of Greenwood’s 12 appearances, four were as a starting pitcher. He recorded no complete games or saves.

In Greenwood’s lone major league victory, on July 31, 1954, at Connie Mack Stadium, he went eight innings, allowing only five hits and two earned runs against the St. Louis Cardinals, but exited the game for pinch hitter Stan Lopata in the bottom of the eighth frame, with the Phils trailing, 5–4. Lopata then hit a two-run home run to put Philadelphia ahead, 6–5, and relief pitcher Murry Dickson held the Cardinals scoreless in the ninth to save Greenwood's victory.

== See also ==
- List of Major League Baseball players from Mexico
