= Harvey Gentry =

American baseball player (1926–2018)

- Pinch hitter
- Born: May 27, 1926; Winston-Salem, North Carolina, U.S.
- Died: July 1, 2018 (aged 92); Pickerington, Ohio, U.S.
- Batted: Left Threw: Right

MLB debut
- April 14, 1954, for the New York Giants

Last MLB appearance
- April 27, 1954, for the New York Giants

MLB statistics
- Games played: 5
- At bats: 4
- Runs batted in: 1
- Stats at Baseball Reference

Teams
- New York Giants (1954)

Harvey William Gentry (May 27, 1926 – July 1, 2018) was an American professional baseball outfielder who played for ten years in the minor leagues, from 1947 through 1956, and appeared briefly in the Major Leagues for the 1954 New York Giants. The native of Winston-Salem, North Carolina, batted left-handed, threw right-handed, and was listed as 6 feet (1.8 m) tall and 170 pounds (77 kg).

Gentry made the Giants' roster at the outset of the 1954 season, after a strong 1953 campaign with Double-A Nashville. At the time, MLB clubs were allowed to carry 28 players during the first month of the regular season before cutting their rosters to the standard 25-man quota. Gentry's tenure occurred during this early-season period. He appeared in five games, all as a pinch hitter, and garnered one hit (a single off Max Surkont of the Pittsburgh Pirates on April 21) and one base on balls. He was credited with one run batted in. The Giants went on to win the National League pennant and 1954 World Series—but Gentry spent the remainder of the year, and his career, in the minors.

He died on July 1, 2018, at the age of 92.
