= Eric Rodin =

American baseball player (1930-1991)

- Pinch hitter / Outfielder
- Born: February 5, 1930; Orange, New Jersey, U.S.
- Died: January 4, 1991 (aged 60); Somerville, New Jersey, U.S.
- Batted: Right Threw: Right

MLB debut
- September 7, 1954, for the New York Giants

Last MLB appearance
- September 24, 1954, for the New York Giants

MLB statistics
- Games played: 5
- At bats: 6
- Hits: 0
- Stats at Baseball Reference

Teams
- New York Giants (1954)

Eric Chapman Rodin (February 5, 1930 – January 4, 1991) was an American professional baseball player. An outfielder, he had a nine-season (1950–1951; 1954–1960) career in minor league baseball, and a five-game major league trial at the close of the 1954 season with the eventual world champion New York Giants. Born in Orange, New Jersey, Rodin attended The Lawrenceville School and the University of Pennsylvania. He threw and batted right-handed, stood 6 feet 2 inches (1.88 m) tall and weighed 215 pounds (98 kg).

Rodin was recalled by the Giants after batting .336 with 18 home runs for the 1954 Nashville Vols of the Double-A Southern Association. He appeared as a pinch hitter and late-inning defensive replacement as a rightfielder and centerfielder for the Giants in five games played, collecting no hits in six at bats with no bases on balls. He struck out twice, including in his first major league at bat against Curt Simmons of the Philadelphia Phillies on September 7.

During his nine-year, 953-game minor league career, Rodin batted .300 with 117 home runs. He retired after the 1960 season.
