= Jim Command =

American baseball player (1928-2014)

- Third baseman/Pinch hitter
- Born: October 15, 1928; Grand Rapids, Michigan, U.S.
- Died: August 10, 2014 (aged 85); Grand Rapids, Michigan, U.S.
- Batted: Left Threw: Right

MLB debut
- June 20, 1954, for the Philadelphia Phillies

Last MLB appearance
- September 20, 1955, for the Philadelphia Phillies

MLB statistics
- Batting average: .174
- Home runs: 1
- Runs batted in: 6
- Stats at Baseball Reference

Teams
- Philadelphia Phillies (1954–1955)

James Dalton Command (October 15, 1928 – August 10, 2014) was an American professional baseball player and scout. He had two separate trials with the 1954–55 Philadelphia Phillies of Major League Baseball (MLB), starting four games as a third baseman in July 1954, while also serving as a pinch hitter and pinch runner, playing in a total of 14 big league games. However, Command was a versatile performer during a 14-season (1947–1959; 1962) minor league career – playing all the infield positions, the outfield, and, late in his career, converting to catcher.

== Playing career ==
Command batted left-handed, threw right-handed, stood 6 feet 2 inches (1.88 m) tall and weighed 205 pounds (93 kg); he was a lifelong resident of Grand Rapids, Michigan and attended Creston High School (Michigan). He was in his eighth year in the Phillies' farm system when he received his first MLB opportunity in the midst of the 1954 season. After going hitless in his first four at bats as a pinch hitter and substitute third baseman, he started his first Major League game on July 11, 1954, against the Brooklyn Dodgers at Ebbets Field. Although he drew a base on balls against Carl Erskine, Command was still hitless in seven plate appearances as a Major Leaguer when he came to bat in the top half of the eighth inning with two outs, the bases loaded and the Phillies trailing 7–3.

"[Dodgers' manager] Walter Alston went to the mound to ask Erskine what the — he knew about this rookie batter, Command. When Erskine told him he didn't know anything, Alston said 'Screw it, just pitch to him,'" Command told the Grand Rapids Press in 2009. Command proceeded to belt Erskine's offering for a grand slam home run to tie the game at seven; it was his first hit and only homer in the Majors. (And the Phillies would lose the game, 8–7.)

In his next two starts, the second game of that July 11 doubleheader and on July 15 against the Cincinnati Redlegs at Crosley Field, Command would collect three more hits (including a double) and two more runs batted in – and that three-game flurry accounted for his entire Major League production. In all, he made four hits in 23 at bats during his two stints with Philadelphia.

== Longtime scout ==
Command continued his playing career at the top level of the minors. While a member of the 1956 Miami Marlins, he caught legendary pitcher Satchel Paige. When his playing career ended, Command was a longtime scout for the Detroit Tigers, spending 36 years with them and contributing to two world championship teams.
