= Paul Penson =

American baseball player (1931-2006)

- Pitcher
- Born: July 12, 1931; Kansas City, Kansas, U.S.
- Died: May 3, 2006 (aged 74); Merriam, Kansas, U.S.
- Batted: Right Threw: Right

MLB debut
- April 21, 1954, for the Philadelphia Phillies

Last MLB appearance
- May 30, 1954, for the Philadelphia Phillies

MLB statistics
- Win–loss record: 1–1
- Earned run average: 4.50
- Strikeouts: 3
- Stats at Baseball Reference

Teams
- Philadelphia Phillies (1954)

Paul Eugene Penson (July 12, 1931 – May 3, 2006) was an American professional baseball player. A right-handed pitcher from Kansas City, Kansas, he worked in five games in Major League Baseball for the Philadelphia Phillies in 1954. He was listed as 6 feet 1 inch (1.85 m) tall and 185 pounds (84 kg).

Penson's professional career began in April 1954 after he had had a successful three-year skein as a pitcher while he served in the military. Penson won 50 games pitching for his base team, although sources disagree about the branch in which he served, reported as the United States Air Force and the U.S. Army. Penson made the Phillies out of training camp in 1954 as a member of the team's early-season, 28-man roster. His five games pitched included three starts, and he split two decisions. His lone MLB win came in his first start, on Sunday, May 16, 1954. in the second game of a doubleheader at Connie Mack Stadium. He went six innings against the St. Louis Cardinals, and allowed four hits, four bases on balls, and one earned run. But he was forced to leave the game leading 6–3 when the game was suspended because of Pennsylvania blue laws prohibiting sporting events on Sunday evenings. The game resumed on Monday, May 17, and Philadelphia went on to win, 8–4; veteran Murry Dickson nailed down the save with three innings of one-run relief.

Penson would allow eight earned runs on 14 hits and 14 bases on balls in his 16 career MLB innings pitched; he struck out three. Plagued by a sore arm, he disappeared into minor league baseball after May 30, where he won only three of 19 decisions before leaving the game in 1956.
