= Johnny Antonelli =

American baseball player (1930–2020)

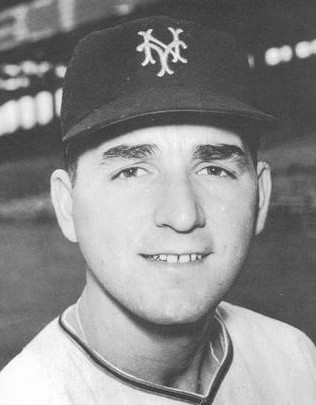
- Antonelli in 1955
- Pitcher
- Born: April 12, 1930; Rochester, New York, U.S.
- Died: February 28, 2020 (aged 89); Rochester, New York, U.S.
- Batted: Left Threw: Left

MLB debut
- July 4, 1948, for the Boston Braves

Last MLB appearance
- September 4, 1961, for the Milwaukee Braves

MLB statistics
- Win–loss record: 126–110
- Earned run average: 3.34
- Strikeouts: 1,162
- Stats at Baseball Reference

Teams
- Boston / Milwaukee Braves (1948–1950, 1953); New York / San Francisco Giants (1954–1960); Cleveland Indians (1961); Milwaukee Braves (1961)

Career highlights and awards
- 6× All-Star (1954, 1956–1959²); World Series champion (1954); NL ERA leader (1954)

John August Antonelli (April 12, 1930 – February 28, 2020) was an American professional baseball player, a left-handed starting pitcher who played in Major League Baseball (MLB) for the Boston / Milwaukee Braves, New York / San Francisco Giants, and Cleveland Indians between 1948 and 1961. Noted at the outset of his pro career as the recipient of the biggest bonus in baseball history when he signed with the Braves for $52,000 in 1948, he later became a six-time National League (NL) All-Star, a two-time 20-game-winner, and an important member of the 1954 World Series champion Giants' pitching staff. He batted left-handed, stood 6 feet 1 inch (1.85 m) tall and weighed 185 pounds (84 kg). He was the first person born in the 1930s to make his MLB debut.

Born in Rochester, New York, his hometown for most of his life, Antonelli was a sought-after pitcher for Jefferson High School. Signed by the Braves in 1948, he spent the next three seasons on their roster, never pitching more than 96 innings in a single season, before serving in the United States Army for two years during the Korean War. After one more year with the Braves in 1953, he was traded to the Giants before the 1954 season. The Giants had to give up popular outfielder Bobby Thomson in the deal, but Antonelli won 21 games, leading the National League in earned run average (ERA) (2.30) and winning percentage (.750) as the Giants won the NL pennant. In the World Series against the Indians, he outpitched Hall of Famer Early Wynn in Game 2 and got the save in Game 4 as New York swept the series.

Arm troubles bothered Antonelli in 1955, but he won 20 games for a sixth-place team in 1956, the first of four straight years he would be selected to the NL All-Star Team. After the Giants moved to San Francisco to begin the 1958 season, Antonelli won 16 games and 19 games his first two years with the ballclub. He led the NL in shutouts again in 1959 and set a career-high with 282 innings pitched, but fans started booing him after he complained about the wind conditions at Seals Stadium. In 1960, he was moved to the bullpen, accruing 11 saves before pitching one final season with the Giants and Indians in 1961. He was slated to be one of the original New York Mets in 1962, but he retired instead, opting to return to Rochester and focus on his Firestone business, which he would run for 40 years.

== Early life ==
A native and lifelong resident of Rochester, New York, Antonelli was the son of Josephine (née Messore) and Gus Antonelli. Gus was a railroad track layer who had emigrated from Italy and found work with the New York Central Railroad. Johnny attended Thomas Jefferson High School in Rochester, where he excelled at baseball, basketball, and football. Initially a first baseman for the school's baseball team, he was moved to the pitcher position by coach Charley O'Brien for his sophomore year. Antonelli's success on the mound attracted the attention of several major league scouts; Hall of Famer Carl Hubbell found Antonelli one of the most balanced pitchers he had ever seen. Gus was eager to promote his son, renting out Silver Stadium in Johnny's senior year so that scouts could come see him throw. In addition to scouts from nine of the 16 major-league teams in existence in 1948, 7,000 fans showed up for the exhibition as well. Boston Braves scout Jeff Jones was so impressed, he got team president Lou Perini to come see the high school pitcher throw.

== Major League Baseball ==
=== Boston Braves ===
Antonelli signed with the Braves on June 29, 1948, for $52,000 ($696,814 in 2025), the largest signing bonus in baseball history at the time. Baseball's bonus rule then mandated that "bonus babies" (players receiving a signing bonus in excess of $4,000) be kept on major league rosters and could not be sent to the minor leagues. Thus, Antonelli went from high school to the major league Braves, a veteran team challenging for Boston's first National League pennant since 1914. He never pitched in the minor leagues.

On July 4, 1948, Antonelli made his major league debut in the first game of a doubleheader against the Philadelphia Phillies, entering in relief to pitch the eighth inning and allowing one run in a 7–2 loss. While the Braves went on to win the 1948 NL championship, Antonelli was used largely as a batting practice pitcher. He appeared in only four games, all relief assignments in low-leverage situations. His large bonus dwarfed the salaries of veteran Braves like ace starting pitcher Johnny Sain, causing some resentment among his teammates. When the Braves voted to divide their World Series share from their loss to the Cleveland Indians, they voted not to award Antonelli any of their winnings. It took the intervention of Commissioner Happy Chandler for Antonelli to be given a 1/8 loser's share, equalling $571.31.

His second season with the Braves, 1949, brought no pennants to Boston, but it saw Antonelli gain more experience. He made his first major league start in the first game of a doubleheader against the New York Giants on May 1, allowing two runs (one earned) in eight innings and earning his first major league win in a 4–2 triumph. On June 12, also in the second game of a doubleheader, he pitched a shutout against the Chicago Cubs. He had a 3–2 win–loss record through June 19, but after losing five decisions in a row through August 3, Antonelli worked exclusively out of the bullpen for the remainder of the season. He worked in 22 games (ten starts), notching his first three career complete games and his first shutout. Antonelli won three games, lost seven, posted a 3.56 earned run average (ERA), and struck out 48 hitters in 96 innings pitched.

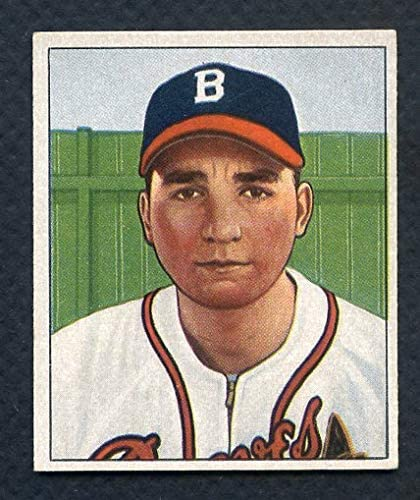
1950 Bowman baseball card of Antonelli with the Boston Braves

Before the 1950 season, Vince Johnson of the Pittsburgh Post-Gazette wrote that Antonelli was "the $75,000 bonus baby who hasn't been worth $7,500." Antonelli made only six starts throughout the season, pitching out of the bullpen in his other 14 appearances. Through July 23, his ERA was 8.44, but it sunk to 5.93 when he threw a shutout against the Cincinnati Reds in the second game of a doubleheader on July 30. In the second game of a doubleheader against the Reds on September 17, he allowed one run in a complete game, 3–1 victory. Antonelli had a 2–3 record in 1950, with a 5.93 ERA, 33 strikeouts, 22 walks, and 81 hits allowed in 57 2/3 innings pitched. It would be three years before he pitched in the major leagues, as he spent 1951 and 1952 serving in the United States Army during the Korean War. Stationed at Fort Myer, Virginia, he posted a 42–2 record while pitching for their baseball team. During his military service, he played with future teammate and Hall of Famer Willie Mays.

His two years of service over, Antonelli rejoined the Braves—now based in Milwaukee—for 1953, where he was finally a regular member of the Braves' starting rotation. On May 8, he pitched a four-hit shutout in a 2–0 win over the Chicago Cubs. He threw another shutout on June 7, allowing five hits in a 6–0 victory over the Phillies. Complete-game, one-run performances July 7 and 12 left him with an 8–4 record and a 2.86 ERA at the All-Star break, though he was not selected to the National League (NL) All-Star team. He suffered from pneumonia in the second half of the season, however, and his record was just 4–8 the rest of the year, though his ERA was 3.67. In 31 games (26 starts), he posted a 12–12 record with 71 walks, and 167 hits allowed in 175 1/3 innings. Despite the pneumonia, Antonelli finished fifth in the NL in ERA (3.18) and seventh in the NL in strikeouts (131). With Chet Nichols Jr. returning from Korean War service in 1954, however, Braves ace Warren Spahn suggested the team trade Antonelli, as they would have had three left-handed starting pitchers otherwise, which Spahn thought would be too many.

==== Giants' All-Star pitcher ====
===== New York (1954–57) =====
In February 1954, Antonelli was dealt to the New York Giants as a major piece in a six-player trade for veteran outfielder Bobby Thomson, one of the most popular Giants since his "Shot Heard 'Round the World" pennant-winning home run of 1951. Mays' biographer James S. Hirsch wrote that the trade was difficult for the Giants, particularly owner Horace Stoneham, who tried to be loyal to long-time members of the organization; however, the Giants needed pitching reinforcement in order to compete. "It was the best break of my career," Antonelli said of the transaction. Facing Milwaukee on June 9, he threw a seven-hit shutout, outpitching Spahn in the Giants' 4–0 triumph. On the strength of an eight-decision winning streak, he was selected to the All-Star team for the first time. He threw a three hit shutout against the Phillies on July 5; Antonelli had also allowed three hits in a shutout victory over them on April 25. Pitching on three days' rest on July 20, on a day when it was over 100 °F (38 °C) at Crosley Field in Cincinnati, Antonelli showed what sportswriter John Drebinger called "an extraordinary display of stamina," pitching all 13 innings of a 2–1 victory over the Cincinnati Redlegs. He won 11 straight decisions from May 25 through August 1. With fellow starters Sal Maglie and Rubén Gómez, Antonelli made starting pitching the Giants' strength. In 1954, Antonelli went 21–7, led the league in ERA (2.30) and shutouts (six), and pitched the Giants to the pennant. He and fellow Giant Hoyt Wilhelm led the NL in winning percentage, with a .750 mark. Antonelli, Maglie, and Gomez combined to win 52 games, complete 37 starts, and help the Giants pitchers post an ERA of 3.09, the lowest in the National League. Hirsch wrote that Antonelli was "[t]he Giants' best pitcher that year," and Antonelli won The Sporting News Pitcher of the Year Award, as well as finishing third in NL Most Valuable Player (MVP) voting (the Cy Young Award had not been introduced yet). Against the Cleveland Indians in the 1954 World Series, Antonelli started Game 2, pitching in and out of trouble all day but allowing one run and outpitching Hall of Famer Early Wynn to earn the victory in the Giants' 3–1 triumph. "The Good Lord was on my side that game," he later said in an interview. "I don’t think I had my best stuff that day." In Game 4, he entered with one out and a runner on first in the eighth inning, then retired five of the six hitters he faced, earning a save in the 7–4 victory as the Giants pulled off a four-game sweep.

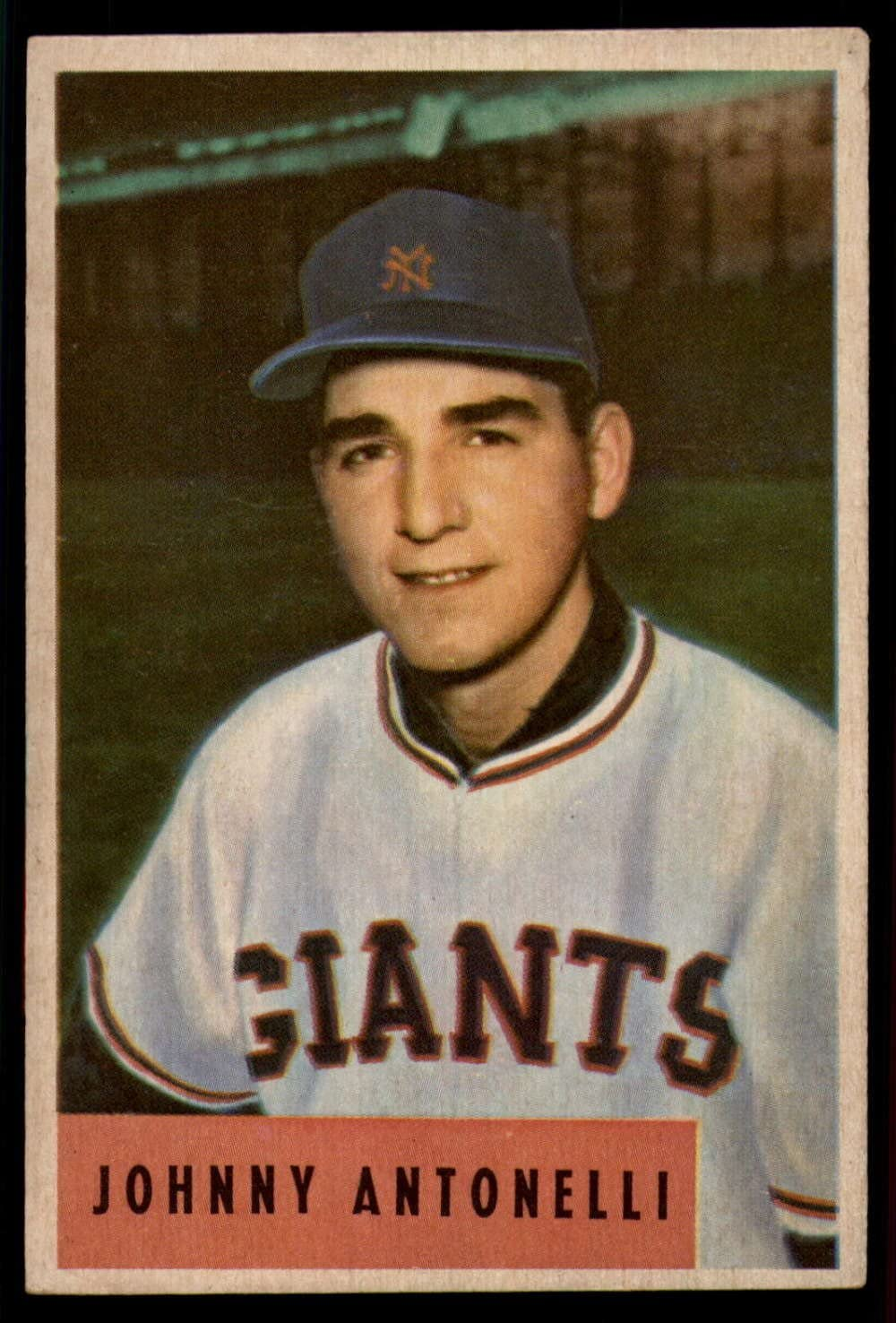
1954 Bowman baseball card of Antonelli with the New York Giants

Although the post-1954 Giants, like the 1949–50 Braves, fell back in the standings, Antonelli had more years of success ahead of him. The Giants were only going to pay him $9,000 (his 1954 salary) in 1955, but teammate Alvin Dark advised him to ask for double or more. Antonelli took his advice and got $28,000. On May 1, he pitched a 16-inning complete game, allowing one run in a 2–1 triumph over Cincinnati. He had a 4–4 record through May 18 but went 3–8 over his next 14 games, posting a 5.61 ERA in that timespan. Starting July 24, he went 7–4 to finish the season, posting a 2.51 ERA. He threw a shutout against the Cardinals on August 2, striking out nine in a 3–0 victory. In the first game of a doubleheader against Cincinnati on August 30, he threw another shutout, allowing five hits in a 5–0 victory over Cincinnati. Against the Philadelphia Phillies on September 3, he was removed from the game by Durocher when the Phillies got two runners to reach in the fifth with one out and the Giants leading 3–2. Pitching coach Freddie Fitzsimmons went to the mound to inform Antonelli he had been removed, and the irate Giants hurler refused to turn the ball over to Fitzsimmons. He stomped around on the mound, walked halfway to second base, then talked to Fitzsimmons for about two minutes before finally heading to the Giants dugout. Durocher said that when he met Antonelli in the dugout, the pitcher cussed and threatened to take the train home to New York; as a result, Durocher suspended Antonelli indefinitely without pay, pending an apology. The suspension was short-lived; back in action four days later, Antonelli threw a complete game, holding the Cardinals to two runs (one earned) and hitting a three-run home run against Larry Jackson as the Giants won 8–2. Antonelli pitched the whole season in 1955 and had a 3.33 ERA but only went 14–16. His 16 losses tied him with Harvey Haddix and teammate Jim Hearn for second in the NL (behind Sam Jones's 20), but his 143 strikeouts tied Don Newcombe for the fourth-highest total in the league. Mays remembered that Antonelli was bothered by "arm problems" that year. Offensively, Antonelli set career highs in home runs (4) and RBI (15).

Despite his 1955 performance, Antonelli saw his salary cut from $28,000 to $21,000 in 1956; the Giants said he needed to win 20 games to get it raised to its previous level. Pitching for a sixth-place team in 1956, Antonelli only managed to win nine games through August 7, against 12 losses. However, he won 11 of his final 12 starts to finish with 20 wins exactly. Mays said he was the only Giants starter who could get outs that year. In the first game of a doubleheader on May 20, he struck out seven in a five-hit shutout of the Cardinals. On June 19, he again had a five-hit seven-strikeout shutout, this one coming against the Cubs. At midseason, he and Mays were the Giants' only selections to the NL All-Star team. On August 15, he struck out 11 and allowed just two hits in a 1–0 shutout victory over the Dodgers. He only struck out three hitters but gave up just three hits on September 12 in a shutout of the Redlegs. In his last start of the season, Antonelli threw his fifth shutout of the year, a four-hitter in a 2–0 victory over the Phillies. With a 20–13 record, Antonelli ranked among the NL leaders in wins (tied for second with Spahn behind Newcombe's 27), ERA (2.86, third, behind Lew Burdette's 2.70 and Spahn's 2.78), strikeouts (145, sixth), and shutouts (five, tied with Newcome for second behind Burdette's six). He finished 14th in NL MVP voting, and Giant fans from Section Five of the Polo Grounds made him a three-foot tall trophy for being the team MVP; years later, the trophy was one of the few mementos from his career Antonelli displayed at his house.

On April 30, 1957, Antonelli struck out nine in a 4–0 shutout of the Braves. Through May 28, Antonelli was 3–6 with a 4.66 ERA. After he gave up four runs without recording an out against Philadelphia that day, he worked exclusively in relief for two weeks. By June 18, his ERA was 4.95. Demonstrating improvement before the All-Star break, he was selected to the NL All-Star Team by Walt Alston, who managed the Giants' archrivals, the Dodgers. Against the Cardinals on July 11, he threw another shutout in a 1–0 victory. He improved his record to 11–11 with a win on August 3 but went 1–7 for the rest of the season. Late in 1957, Bill Rigney held him out of the rotation for a few days to ensure that Antonelli could start the Giants' final game at the Polo Grounds before moving to San Francisco. However, Antonelli took the loss in that game on September 29, allowing four runs in two innings as the Pirates won 9–1. In 40 games (30 starts), he had a 12–18 record, a 3.77 ERA, and 114 strikeouts in 212 1/3 innings pitched. His 18 losses tied with Bob Friend for second in the league, behind Robin Roberts's 22.

==== San Francisco (1958–60) ====
On May 5, 1958, with the Giants trailing the Pirates 11–4 in the ninth inning, Antonelli pinch-hit for Pete Burnside and had an RBI double against Vern Law, eventually scoring himself as the Giants rallied, though San Francisco still lost 11–10. Entering a tie game in the ninth inning on June 8, he threw six shutout innings as the Giants defeated the Phillies 5–4 in 14 innings. For the third year in a row, he was a part of the NL All-Star team. On July 6, he threw 6 2/3 shutout innings, earning the win in a 1–0 triumph over the Pirates. He worked 10 innings on August 19, striking out eight in a 4–3 victory over the Redlegs. On September 28, he came within one out of a complete game, allowing three runs (two earned) in a 4–3 victory over St. Louis. In 41 games (13 starts), he had a 16–13 record. On the one hand, he led the NL in home runs allowed (31) and failed to throw a shutout for the first time since 1948. However, he was still among the league leaders in wins (sixth), ERA (3.28, sixth), and strikeouts (143, tied with Johnny Podres for third behind Jones's 225 and Spahn's 150).

On May 11, 1959, Antonelli pitched 11 innings against the Dodgers, allowing just one earned run but getting a no decision in a 13-inning, 2–1 defeat. Against the Cubs on May 31, he struck out a season-high 11 batters in a 6–3 victory. He threw back-to-back shutouts against the Phillies and Cubs in victories on June 28 and July 3. MLB held two All-Star Games in 1959, and Antonelli was selected to both of them. Although he only pitched one-third of an inning, he was the winning pitcher in relief in the first All-Star Game on July 7, when the NL rallied from a 4–3 deficit in the eighth inning to prevail over the American League, 5–4, at Forbes Field. He pitched two other shutouts against the Phillies on July 16 and August 21, the first coming in a 1–0 victory where Antonelli gave up just three hits. After giving up two home runs to the Dodgers on July 20, he was critical of Seals Stadium, where the Giants were playing while Candlestick Park was constructed. "A pitcher should be paid double for working here," he said. "Worst ballpark in America. Every time you stand up there, you’ve got to beat the hitter and a 30-mile-per-hour wind." This impaired his relation with the San Francisco fans, several of whom took to booing him during games, though Antonelli denied criticizing the city itself. Still, he went 19–10 in 38 starts for the Giants, and tying for the NL shutout lead (four) with six other pitchers. Antonelli also ranked among the league leaders in wins (fourth, behind Jones's, Spahn's, and Burdette's 21), ERA (3.10, seventh), strikeouts (165, fourth, behind Don Drysdale's 242, Jones's 209, and Sandy Koufax's 173), and innings pitched (282, his career high, and the third-highest total in the league behind Spahn's 292 and Burdette's 289 2/3). He batted .158 but had 10 RBI, as a hitter.

The move to Candlestick Park in 1960 did not help Antonelli, who had trouble winning. His first two games of the season came in relief, his first start not coming until the Giants' 18th game of the year on May 5. On May 15, he threw a shutout in a 2–0 victory over the Dodgers. Antonelli lost four games in a row from May 27 through June 11, however, and spent most of the rest of the season in the bullpen, only making two more starts all season. Robert H. Boyle of Sports Illustrated wrote of him in July, "Yes, what with three wins and five losses, yesterday's hero is now in the bullpen." Used often at the end of games, Antonelli converted 11 saves in 14 tries, tying with Turk Farrell for fifth in the NL in that category. In 41 games (10 starts), he had a 6–7 record, a 3.77 ERA, 57 strikeouts, and 106 hits allowed in 112 1/3 innings. He walked 47 hitters, but ten of those were intentional. On December 3, he was traded to the Indians (his 1954 World Series foe) with Willie Kirkland for Harvey Kuenn.

=== Indians and Braves ===
The Indians made Antonelli their fourth starter to begin the 1961 season. After a no-decision in his first start of 1961, he lost his next four attempts, with his ERA ballooning to 6.04, before he was moved to the bullpen. On July 4, his contract was sold to his original organization, the Braves. He worked in nine games for Milwaukee, all in relief, and won his only decision, but his ERA (7.59) was higher than it had been in Cleveland (6.56). His final major league appearance came on September 4, when he allowed a run in two innings in a 6–2 loss to the Cubs. In 20 games (seven starts) between Cleveland and Milwaukee, Antonelli had a 1–4 record, a 6.75 ERA, 31 strikeouts, 21 walks, and 84 hits allowed in 58 2/3 innings pitched.

== Retirement ==
On October 11, his contract was sold again, this time to the expansion New York Mets, a deal that would have returned Antonelli to the ballpark (the Polo Grounds) and the city where he had experienced his greatest MLB success. But instead of pitching for the Mets, he decided to retire in February 1962. Antonelli said he was "tired of traveling" and wanted to be home with his family. "I guess Johnny Antonelli is doing all right selling those black doughnuts in Rochester," Mets manager Casey Stengel said, in reference to Antonelli's Firestone business.

== Career statistics, pitching style ==
In 12 MLB seasons, Antonelli worked in 377 regular-season games, with 268 starts. He fashioned a 126–110 record, with 102 complete games, 25 shutouts and 21 saves. In 1,9921/3 innings pitched, he allowed 1,870 hits and 687 walks, striking out 1,162. His career earned run average was 3.34. In two World Series games in 1954, he compiled a 1–0 record, allowing one run (on a home run to Cleveland's Al Smith leading off Game 2) on eight hits and seven bases on balls in 102/3 innings pitched, with 12 strikeouts, for an earned run average of 0.84 . In All-Star play, he pitched in three of the six midsummer games he was selected to (in 1954, 1956 and 1959) and compiled an ERA of 4.26 in 61/3 innings pitched, winning the first All-Star Game of 1959.

As a hitter, Antonelli posted a .178 batting average (121-for-679) with 56 runs, 15 home runs, 59 RBI and 26 bases on balls. From 1956 through the end of his career, he served as a pinch hitter or pinch runner in at least one game each season.

Antonelli relied on a fastball and curveball when he was pitching, but he also threw some off-speed pitches occasionally. He credited the Polo Grounds for some of his success upon coming to New York. "The Polo Grounds was a friendly ballpark for me. I was able to keep batters from pulling the ball. I made them hit the ball straight away, and I had Willie Mays to track it down."

== Personal life ==
While he was pitching for the Braves, Antonelli married Rosemarie Carbone, whom he had met in Boston. The couple had four children: Lisa, Donna, Regina, and John Jr. After Rosemarie died in 2002, Antonelli remarried to Gail Harms in 2006.

On November 5, 1954, Antonelli's hometown of Rochester declared a "Johnny Antonelli Day," throwing a parade in the pitcher's honor and presenting him with a new Buick as well as a key to the city. Antonelli, who had lived in Lexington, Massachusetts, during his time with the Braves, announced plans to move back to Rochester "in the very near future." He was good to his word, opening up a chain of Firestone Tire stores in the city. "I started the business with my World Series money," he told the Democrat and Chronicle in 2014. His first location opened in 1955 at the intersection of Keeler Street and North Clinton Avenue. Over time, the business expanded to 28 locations in Monroe County as well as other parts of New York state, as Antonelli was the exclusive Firestone dealer for the area. While the Rochester Red Wings still played at Silver Stadium, the tire company sponsored an annual "Johnny Antonelli Night," giving away tires and televisions. Antonelli's stores also sponsored "Captain Friendly," a program in which store managers would drive around Rochester looking for people with car trouble, then help them free of charge. Antonelli ran the businesses until 1994, retiring over frustrations with Bridgestone, which had purchased Firestone in the meantime. "We were just spinning our wheels," he said. By 2012, he lived in Pittsford, a Rochester suburb. He once served as a board member for the Red Wings, and he was a member of the Oak Hill Country Club, as golf was a hobby of his. Antonelli died of cancer on February 28, 2020, at the age of 89.

== See also ==
- List of Major League Baseball annual ERA leaders

== Bibliography ==
- Barra, Allen (2013). Mickey and Willie: Mantle and Mays, the Parallel Lives of Baseball's Golden Age. New York: Crown Archetype. ISBN 978-0-307-71648-4.
- Hirsch, James S. (2010). Willie Mays: The Life, the Legend. New York: Scribner. ISBN 978-1-4165-4790-7.
- Mays, Willie; Sahadi, Lou (1988). Say Hey: The Autobiography of Willie Mays. New York: Simon and Schuster. ISBN 0671632922.
