= Ralph Beard (baseball) =

American baseball player (1929–2003)

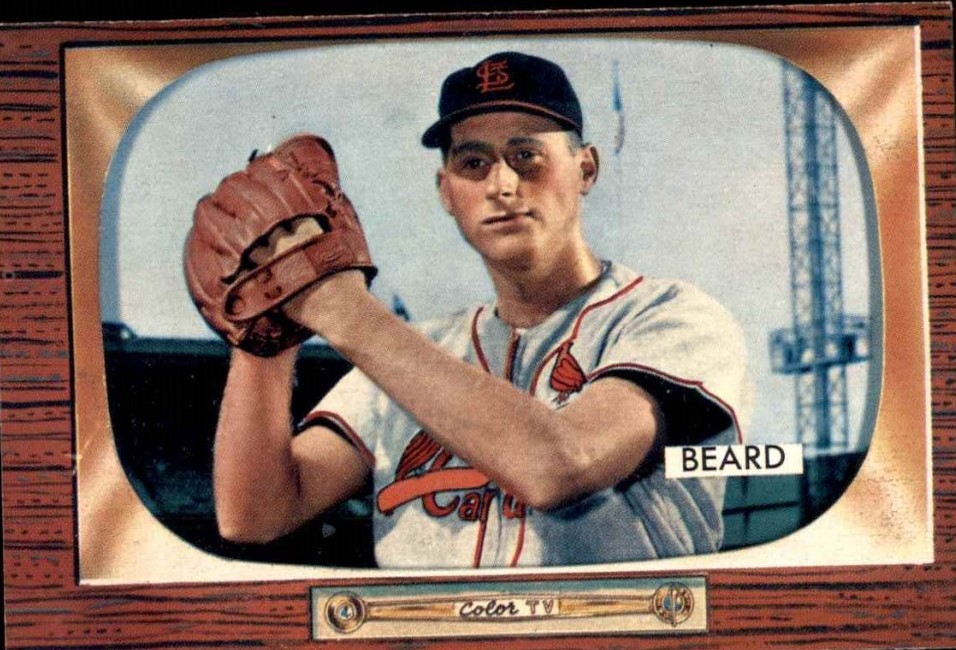
- 1955 Bowman card
- Pitcher
- Born: February 11, 1929; Cincinnati, Ohio, U.S.
- Died: February 10, 2003 (aged 73); West Palm Beach, Florida, U.S.
- Batted: Right Threw: Right

MLB debut
- June 29, 1954, for the St. Louis Cardinals

Last MLB appearance
- September 9, 1954, for the St. Louis Cardinals

MLB statistics
- Win–loss record: 0–4
- Earned run average: 3.72
- Innings pitched: 58
- Stats at Baseball Reference

Teams
- St. Louis Cardinals (1954)

Ralph William Beard (February 11, 1929 – February 10, 2003) was an American professional baseball player, a right-handed pitcher whose ten-season (1947–56) pro career included 13 games pitched for the St. Louis Cardinals of Major League Baseball. Beard, a native of Cincinnati, attended the University of Cincinnati. He stood 6 feet 5 inches (1.96 m) tall and weighed 200 pounds (91 kg).

Beard's 13 big-league appearances included ten starting pitcher assignments, as he took a regular turn in the Cardinals' rotation during late July and August of the 1954 season. Although he lost all four decisions, he made a memorable start on July 22, 1954, against the Pittsburgh Pirates at Busch Stadium. He went 12 innings and allowed only one earned run and eight hits (including a home run by Preston Ward for the Pirates' earned run), but left the game for a pinch hitter with the score tied 2–2. He was relieved by Gerry Staley, who hurled two perfect frames and St. Louis won, 3–2, in 14 innings.

As a starter, Beard gave up 29 runs in ten efforts and 49 2/3 innings pitched, but only 21 were earned (for a 3.81 earned run average in starting assignments). All told as a Major Leaguer, he surrendered 62 hits and 28 bases on balls in 58 innings pitched, with 17 strikeouts.

Beard died in West Palm Beach, Florida, on the day before his 74th birthday.
