= Bob Darnell =

American baseball player (1930-1995)

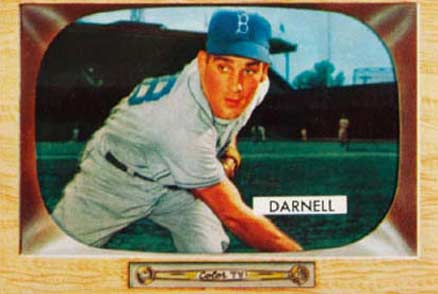
- Pitcher
- Born: November 6, 1930; Wewoka, Oklahoma, U.S.
- Died: January 3, 1995 (aged 64); Fredericksburg, Texas, U.S.
- Batted: Right Threw: Right

MLB debut
- August 10, 1954, for the Brooklyn Dodgers

Last MLB appearance
- April 29, 1956, for the Brooklyn Dodgers

MLB statistics
- Record: 0–0
- Earned run average: 2.87
- Strikeouts: 5
- Stats at Baseball Reference

Teams
- Brooklyn Dodgers (1954, 1956)

Robert Jack Darnell (November 6, 1930 – January 3, 1995) was an American professional baseball pitcher who appeared in seven games in Major League Baseball during the 1954 and 1956 seasons for the Brooklyn Dodgers. The right-hander, a native of Wewoka, Oklahoma, was listed as 5 feet 10 inches (1.78 m) tall and 175 pounds (79 kg).

Darnell's nine-year pro career began in 1953 and all of it was spent at the Triple-A level or above. In his two Brooklyn trials, he started one contest and relieved in six others. He did not earn a decision or a save, and posted a 2.87 earned run average. In 152/3 innings pitched, he allowed 16 hits, seven bases on balls, and five earned runs, with five strikeouts. In his lone start, on August 16, 1954, at Ebbets Field Darnell opposed future Hall of Famer Robin Roberts, and surrendered four runs (with two earned) and five hits in two-plus innings of work. The Philadelphia Phillies went on to win the contest, 9–6, with Dodger reliever Clem Labine getting the loss.
