= Joe Presko =

American baseball player (1928–2019)

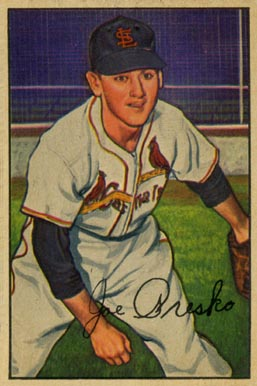
- Pitcher
- Born: October 7, 1928; Kansas City, Missouri, U.S.
- Died: February 5, 2019 (aged 90); Kansas City, Missouri, U.S.
- Batted: Right Threw: Right

MLB debut
- May 3, 1951, for the St. Louis Cardinals

Last MLB appearance
- May 7, 1958, for the Detroit Tigers

MLB statistics
- Win–loss record: 25–37
- Earned run average: 4.61
- Strikeouts: 202
- Stats at Baseball Reference

Teams
- St. Louis Cardinals (1951–1954); Detroit Tigers (1957–1958)

Joseph Edward Presko (October 7, 1928 – February 5, 2019) was an American professional baseball player. A right-handed pitcher, he was signed by the St. Louis Cardinals in 1948 as an amateur free agent and made his Major League Baseball debut on May 3, 1951.

== Biography ==
Used primarily as a starting pitcher in four seasons with St. Louis (1951–54) and as a reliever for parts of two seasons with the Detroit Tigers (1957–58), Presko was known as "Baby Face" Presko, "Baby Joe", or "Little Joe." He was listed at 5 feet 9 inches (1.75 m) tall and 165 pounds (75 kg). He retired from professional baseball after the 1959 season, with a lifetime record of 25–37 in 128 games played including 5 saves and a career earned-run average of 4.61.

After retirement, Presko coached American Legion Baseball, mentoring a young David Cone, who went on to star with his hometown Kansas City Royals, New York Yankees, New York Mets, and Toronto Blue Jays. Presko is featured in the initial launch for the Topps Company's 1952 Major League Baseball trading cards #220. He died at his home on February 5, 2019.
