= George O'Donnell =

American baseball player (1929–2012)

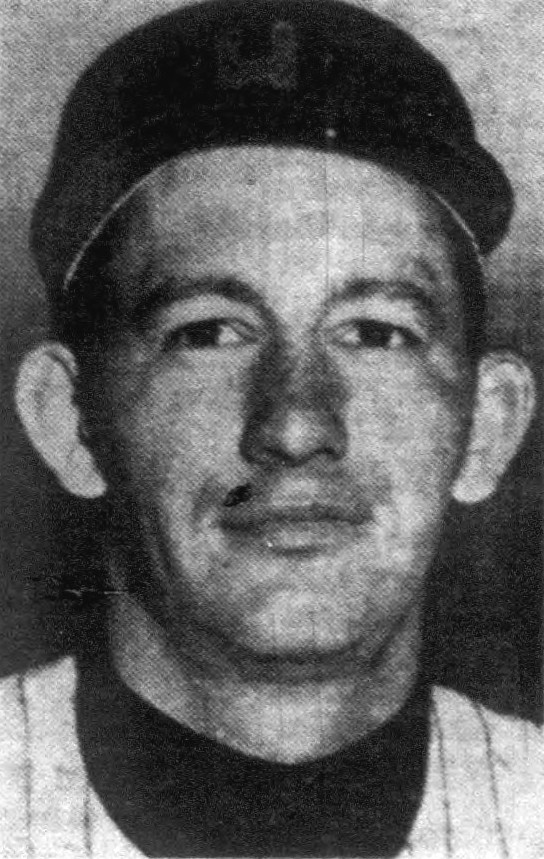
- O'Donnell, circa 1953
- Pitcher
- Born: May 27, 1929; Winchester, Illinois, U.S.
- Died: December 19, 2012 (aged 83); Springfield, Illinois, U.S.
- Batted: Right Threw: Right

MLB debut
- April 18, 1954, for the Pittsburgh Pirates

Last MLB appearance
- July 25, 1954, for the Pittsburgh Pirates

MLB statistics
- Win–loss record: 3–9
- Earned run average: 4.53
- Strikeouts: 8
- Stats at Baseball Reference

Teams
- Pittsburgh Pirates (1954)

George Dana O'Donnell (May 27, 1929 – December 19, 2012) was an American pitcher in Major League Baseball. He played one season with the Pittsburgh Pirates in the 1954 season. Overall, he played professional baseball for thirteen seasons, from 1949 through 1961, mostly in the Minor leagues.

== Photo ==
File:1- Original-4x6.jpg
