= Dave Jolly =

American baseball player (1924–1963)

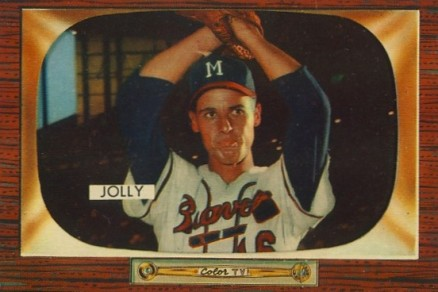
- Jolly on a 1955 Bowman baseball card
- Pitcher
- Born: October 14, 1924; Stony Point, North Carolina, U.S.
- Died: May 27, 1963 (aged 38); Durham, North Carolina, U.S.
- Batted: Right Threw: Right

MLB debut
- May 9, 1953, for the Milwaukee Braves

Last MLB appearance
- September 14, 1957, for the Milwaukee Braves

MLB statistics
- Win–loss record: 16–14
- Earned run average: 3.77
- Strikeouts: 155
- Stats at Baseball Reference

Teams
- Milwaukee Braves (1953–1957)

David Jolly (October 14, 1924 – May 27, 1963) was an American Major League Baseball relief pitcher. The 6 ft 0 in (1.83 m), 165 lb (75 kg) right-hander was a native of Stony Point, North Carolina. He was signed by the St. Louis Browns as an amateur free agent before the 1946 season. After pitching in the Browns, Cincinnati Reds, and New York Yankees organizations, he was drafted by the Boston Braves from the Yankees in the 1952 rule V draft (December 1). He played for the Milwaukee Braves from 1953 to 1957 and was a member of the 1957 World Series championship team.

== High school ==
Jolly attended Stony Point High School in Stony Point, North Carolina. As a member of the school's baseball team, he helped in leading them to the 1942 North Carolina Class C state title.

== Professional career ==
Jolly made his major league debut in relief on May 9, 1953, against the Chicago Cubs at Milwaukee County Stadium. From 1953 to 1957, the first five years that the Braves were in Milwaukee, he was second on the pitching staff with 158 relief appearances, an average of almost 32 per season. During those seasons the closer's job was held at different times by Lew Burdette, Ernie Johnson, Jolly, and Don McMahon.

Jolly's best season was 1954, when he was 11–6 with 10 saves and a 2.43 earned run average in 47 games. He finished in the National League Top Ten for winning percentage, games pitched, games finished, and saves.

Career totals for 160 games (159 as a pitcher) include a record of 16–14, 1 game started, 0 complete games, 82 games finished, 19 saves, and an ERA of 3.77. He wielded a strong bat for a pitcher, going 14-for-48 (.292) with 1 home run, 7 runs batted in, and 8 runs scored.

Jolly was a member of the Milwaukee Braves 1957 World Series championship team. Following that season, on October 15, 1957, he was purchased from the Braves by the San Francisco Giants, but never again pitched in a big league game.

== Death ==
Jolly died in 1963 at the age of 38 in Durham, North Carolina, one year after he underwent surgery for a brain tumor. He was buried at Stony Point Cemetery in Stony Point, North Carolina.
