= Royce Lint =

American baseball player (1921–2006)

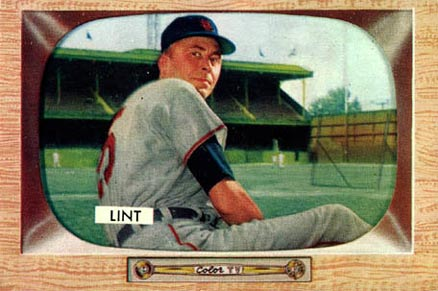
- Pitcher
- Born: January 1, 1921; Birmingham, Alabama, U.S.
- Died: April 3, 2006 (aged 85); Portland, Oregon, U.S.
- Batted: Left Threw: Left

MLB debut
- April 13, 1954, for the St. Louis Cardinals

Last MLB appearance
- August 29, 1954, for the St. Louis Cardinals

MLB statistics
- Win–loss record: 2–3
- Earned run average: 4.86
- Strikeouts: 36
- Stats at Baseball Reference

Teams
- St. Louis Cardinals (1954)

Royce Lint (January 1, 1921 – April 3, 2006) was an American left-handed Major League Baseball pitcher who played for the St. Louis Cardinals in 1954.

== Early career ==
Lint was born in Birmingham, Alabama. He began his professional career in 1939, playing in minor league baseball until 1942, when much of minor league baseball was briefly cancelled due to World War II. He resumed playing in 1946 after a stint in the United States Army Air Forces and continued in the minor leagues until 1953. By that time, he had 141 minor league victories to his credit though no major league experience.

== 1954 ==
Lint, a 33-year-old rookie, spent the entire 1954 season with the St. Louis Cardinals as a relief pitcher. He made his major league debut on April 13 against the Chicago Cubs, pitching two innings and allowing no runs. The first batter he faced was Bob Talbot and his first strikeout, also recorded in that game, was Randy Jackson.

Lint appeared in 33 games for the Cardinals in 1954 and went 2–3 with a 4.86 ERA in 70 1/3 innings. Though 29 of his appearances were in relief, four were starts — the first of which came in the second game of a doubleheader on July 4. Facing the Cubs, he threw a complete-game shutout.

== Later career ==
Lint returned to the minor leagues in 1955 and remained there until 1956. Overall, he went 154–113 with a 3.49 ERA in 492 minor league games over 14 seasons.

Lint died in Portland, Oregon, at the age of 85.
