= Jake Thies =

American baseball player (1926–2013)

- Pitcher
- Born: April 1, 1926; St. Louis, Missouri, U.S.
- Died: February 10, 2013 (aged 86); Florissant, Missouri, U.S.
- Batted: Right Threw: Right

MLB debut
- April 24, 1954, for the Pittsburgh Pirates

Last MLB appearance
- April 17, 1955, for the Pittsburgh Pirates

MLB statistics
- Win–loss record: 3–10
- Earned run average: 3.90
- Strikeouts: 57
- Stats at Baseball Reference

Teams
- Pittsburgh Pirates (1954–1955)

Vernon Arthur Thies (April 1, 1926 – February 10, 2013) was an American Major League Baseball pitcher. Listed at 5 feet 11 inches (1.80 m), 170 pounds (77 kg), he batted and threw right handed.

Born in St. Louis, Missouri, Thies served in the 117th Infantry Division during World War II. After discharge, he attended the University of Illinois at Urbana–Champaign for one year.

After playing for several minor league teams, Thies joined the Pittsburgh Pirates in 1954, pitching in 34 games (33 starts) while collecting a 3–9 record and a 3.87 earned run average in 130 innings. In addition, he hurled three complete games, including a three-hit shutout on August 13 against the Philadelphia Phillies at Connie Mack Stadium. His ERA was the second-best for the last-place Pirates, being surpassed only by Dick Littlefield (3.60).

In 1955, Thies made one start for the Pirates at Forbes Field while facing the Brooklyn Dodgers. He allowed five runs (two earned) on five hits and three walks, while striking out one batter in 3 2/3 innings of work. He was credited with the loss and never appeared in a major league game again.

In a two-season career, Thies posted a 3–10 record with a 3.90 and 57 strikeouts in 134 innings. He later pitched for Triple A Columbus Jets in 1956. It was his last season in organized baseball.

After baseball, Thies worked in sales for more than 40 years.

Thies died in 2013 in Florissant, Missouri, at the age of 86.
