= 1958 Los Angeles Dodgers season =

1958 Los Angeles Dodgers
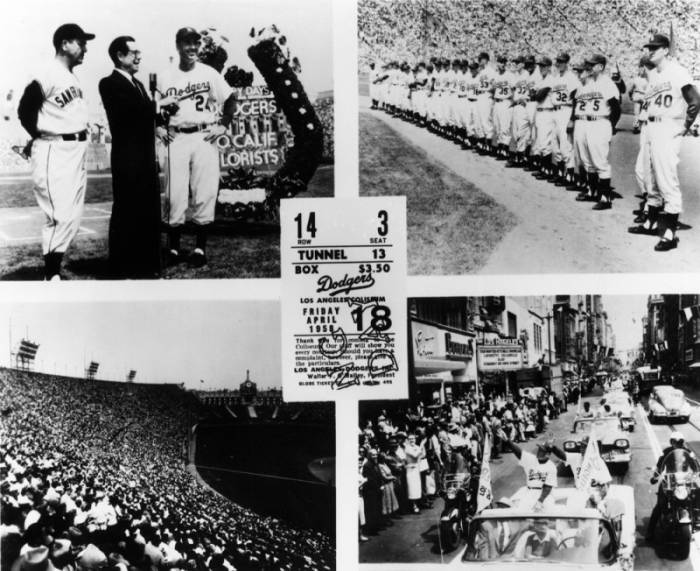
- Home opener at the Coliseum on April 18 and Downtown Parade welcoming the Dodgers
- League: National League
- Ballpark: Los Angeles Memorial Coliseum
- City: Los Angeles
- Record: 71–83 (.461)
- Divisional place: 7th
- Owners: Walter O'Malley, James & Dearie Mulvey
- President: Walter O'Malley
- General managers: Buzzie Bavasi
- Managers: Walter Alston
- Television: KTTV (11)
- Radio: KMPC (Vin Scully, Jerry Doggett); KWKW (René Cárdenas, Miguel Alonzo, Milt Nava)

The 1958 Los Angeles Dodgers season was the 69th season for the Los Angeles Dodgers franchise in Major League Baseball (MLB), their 1st season in Los Angeles, California, and their 1st season playing their home games at Los Angeles Memorial Coliseum in Los Angeles California. The Dodgers took the field before 78,672 fans at the Los Angeles Memorial Coliseum on April 18, 1958, to usher in the beginning of the team's new home in Los Angeles. It was a rough season, as the Dodgers finished 21 games in back of the pennant-winning Milwaukee Braves in the National League standings, but it was the beginning of the second phase for the team. Vin Scully and company moved to KTTV (television) and KMPC (radio) from that year onward, and the Dodgers became one of the first teams that commenced Spanish language radio broadcasts for Latinos, with KWKW as the first station to offer a Spanish-language service.

== Offseason ==
=== Spring training ===
The Dodgers played their first exhibition game as the Los Angeles Dodgers on March 8, 1958. The team faced the Philadelphia Phillies at Miami Stadium. Ron Negray started for the Dodgers and gave up four runs in a 7 to 4 Dodgers loss. The New York Times noted that as much as the game was a historic milestone for the franchise, it was a chance for manager Walter Alston to evaluate players under game conditions, especially catchers, following Roy Campanella's offseason auto accident that ended his career before he could ever play for Los Angeles.

== Regular season ==
- April 15–20, 1958: The Dodgers and Giants played their first six official National League games as representatives of their new cities on the West Coast with back-to-back three-game series, first at Seals Stadium, San Francisco, then at the Los Angeles Memorial Coliseum. The Giants won four of those six games. In the season opener April 15, San Francisco blanked Los Angeles, 8–0, behind Rubén Gómez' complete game, six-hit shutout. Don Drysdale took the loss, and Charlie Neal notched Los Angeles' first hit, a single, in the second inning. In their home opener April 18 in Los Angeles, the Dodgers built a 5–2 lead behind starting pitcher Carl Erskine, and held on to win 6–5. A throng of 78,762 witnessed the event at the Coliseum. Dick Gray, who hit the first home run in Los Angeles Dodger history April 16 in the second game of the 1958 season, also hit the first four-bagger before their home crowd in the seventh inning, giving Los Angeles an insurance run. The Giants nearly tied the game in the ninth inning, but Jim Davenport was ruled out for failing to touch third base after apparently scoring on a triple by San Francisco's Willie Kirkland.

Opening Day starters
| Name | Position |
|---|---|
| Gino Cimoli | Center fielder |
| Pee Wee Reese | Shortstop |
| Duke Snider | Left fielder |
| Gil Hodges | First baseman |
| Charlie Neal | Second baseman |
| Dick Gray | Third baseman |
| Carl Furillo | Right fielder |
| Rube Walker | Catcher |
| Don Drysdale | Starting pitcher |

Home opener starters
| Name | Position |
|---|---|
| Jim Gilliam | Left fielder |
| Pee Wee Reese | Shortstop |
| Duke Snider | Right fielder |
| Gil Hodges | First baseman |
| Charlie Neal | Second baseman |
| Dick Gray | Third baseman |
| Gino Cimoli | Center fielder |
| John Roseboro | Catcher |
| Carl Erskine | Starting pitcher |

- April 23, 1958: Gil Hodges hit his 300th home run, and Pee Wee Reese played his 2,000th game, on the same day that Duke Snider injured his arm before the game trying to throw a ball out of the Los Angeles Coliseum.

=== Season standings ===
National League
| Team | W | L | Pct. | GB | Home | Road |
|---|---|---|---|---|---|---|
| Milwaukee Braves | 92 | 62 | .597 | — | 48‍–‍29 | 44‍–‍33 |
| Pittsburgh Pirates | 84 | 70 | .545 | 8 | 49‍–‍28 | 35‍–‍42 |
| San Francisco Giants | 80 | 74 | .519 | 12 | 44‍–‍33 | 36‍–‍41 |
| Cincinnati Redlegs | 76 | 78 | .494 | 16 | 40‍–‍37 | 36‍–‍41 |
| Chicago Cubs | 72 | 82 | .468 | 20 | 35‍–‍42 | 37‍–‍40 |
| St. Louis Cardinals | 72 | 82 | .468 | 20 | 39‍–‍38 | 33‍–‍44 |
| Los Angeles Dodgers | 71 | 83 | .461 | 21 | 39‍–‍38 | 32‍–‍45 |
| Philadelphia Phillies | 69 | 85 | .448 | 23 | 35‍–‍42 | 34‍–‍43 |

=== Record vs. opponents ===
1958 National League record Sources:
| Team | CHC | CIN | LAD | MIL | PHI | PIT | SF | STL |
|---|---|---|---|---|---|---|---|---|
| Chicago | — | 10–12 | 11–11 | 10–12 | 13–9 | 9–13 | 12–10 | 7–15 |
| Cincinnati | 12–10 | — | 11–11 | 5–17 | 15–7 | 10–12 | 11–11 | 12–10 |
| Los Angeles | 11–11 | 11–11 | — | 14–8 | 10–12 | 8–14 | 6–16 | 11–11 |
| Milwaukee | 12–10 | 17–5 | 8–14 | — | 13–9 | 11–11 | 16–6 | 15–7 |
| Philadelphia | 9–13 | 7–15 | 12–10 | 9–13 | — | 12–10 | 8–14 | 12–10 |
| Pittsburgh | 13–9 | 12–10 | 14–8 | 11–11 | 10–12 | — | 12–10 | 12–10 |
| San Francisco | 10–12 | 11–11 | 16–6 | 6–16 | 14–8 | 10–12 | — | 13–9 |
| St. Louis | 15–7 | 10–12 | 11–11 | 7–15 | 10–12 | 10–12 | 9–13 | — |

=== Notable transactions ===
- June 15, 1958: The Dodgers traded Don Newcombe to Cincinnati Redlegs for Steve Bilko, Johnny Klippstein and players to be named later. The Redlegs completed the deal by sending Art Fowler and Charlie Rabe to the Dodgers on June 23.
- August 4, 1958: Randy Jackson was purchased from the Dodgers by the Cleveland Indians.
- August 15, 1958: Ramón Conde was purchased by the Dodgers from the Philadelphia Phillies.

=== Roster ===
1958 Los Angeles Dodgers
Roster
| Pitchers: 46 Don Bessent; 12,37 Babe Birrer; 55 Jackie Collum; 40 Roger Craig; 53 Don Drysdale; 17 Carl Erskine; 16 Bob Giallombardo; 26 Fred Kipp; 35 Johnny Klippstein; 32 Sandy Koufax; 41 Clem Labine; 29 Ralph Mauriello; 16 Danny McDevitt; 38 Ron Negray; 36 Don Newcombe; 22 Johnny Podres; 37 Ed Roebuck; 35,51 Larry Sherry; 40 Stan Williams | Catchers: 58 Joe Pignatano; 8 John Roseboro; 10 Rube Walker; Infielders: 33,36 Steve Bilko; 27 Jim Gentile; 11 Dick Gray; 14 Gil Hodges; 2 Randy Jackson; 11,30 Bob Lillis; 43 Charlie Neal; 1 Pee Wee Reese; 61 Earl Robinson; 23 Don Zimmer | Outfielders: 9 Gino Cimoli; 2,27 Don Demeter; 55 Ron Fairly; 6 Carl Furillo; 19 Jim Gilliam; 25 Frank Howard; 5 Norm Larker; 45 Don Miles; 4 Duke Snider; 3 Elmer Valo; 16 Bob Wilson | Manager: 24 Walter Alston; Coaches: 33 Joe Becker; 7 Charlie Dressen; 31 Greg Mulleavy; 10 Rube Walker |

== Player stats ==
=== Batting ===
==== Starters by position ====
Note: Pos = Position; G = Games played; AB = At bats; H = Hits; Avg. = Batting average; HR = Home runs; RBI = Runs batted in

| Pos | Player | G | AB | H | Avg. | HR | RBI |
|---|---|---|---|---|---|---|---|
| C | John Roseboro | 114 | 384 | 104 | .271 | 14 | 43 |
| 1B | Gil Hodges | 141 | 475 | 123 | .259 | 22 | 64 |
| 2B | Charlie Neal | 140 | 473 | 120 | .254 | 22 | 65 |
| SS | Don Zimmer | 127 | 455 | 119 | .262 | 17 | 60 |
| 3B | Dick Gray | 58 | 197 | 49 | .249 | 9 | 30 |
| LF | Jim Gilliam | 147 | 555 | 145 | .261 | 2 | 43 |
| CF | Duke Snider | 106 | 327 | 102 | .312 | 15 | 58 |
| RF | Carl Furillo | 122 | 411 | 119 | .290 | 18 | 83 |

==== Other batters ====
Note: G = Games played; AB = At bats; H = Hits; Avg. = Batting average; HR = Home runs; RBI = Runs batted in

| Player | G | AB | H | Avg. | HR | RBI |
|---|---|---|---|---|---|---|
| Gino Cimoli | 109 | 325 | 80 | .246 | 9 | 27 |
| Norm Larker | 99 | 253 | 70 | .277 | 4 | 29 |
| Pee Wee Reese | 59 | 147 | 33 | .224 | 4 | 17 |
| Joe Pignatano | 63 | 142 | 31 | .218 | 9 | 17 |
| Don Demeter | 43 | 106 | 20 | .189 | 5 | 8 |
| Elmer Valo | 65 | 101 | 25 | .248 | 1 | 14 |
| Steve Bilko | 47 | 101 | 21 | .208 | 7 | 18 |
| Bob Lillis | 20 | 69 | 27 | .391 | 1 | 5 |
| Randy Jackson | 35 | 65 | 12 | .185 | 1 | 4 |
| Ron Fairly | 15 | 53 | 15 | .283 | 2 | 8 |
| Rube Walker | 25 | 44 | 5 | .114 | 1 | 7 |
| Jim Gentile | 12 | 30 | 4 | .133 | 0 | 4 |
| Frank Howard | 8 | 29 | 7 | .241 | 1 | 2 |
| Don Miles | 8 | 22 | 4 | .182 | 0 | 0 |
| Earl Robinson | 8 | 15 | 3 | .200 | 0 | 0 |
| Bob Wilson | 3 | 5 | 1 | .200 | 0 | 0 |

=== Pitching ===
==== Starting pitchers ====
Note: G = Games pitched; IP = Innings pitched; W = Wins; L = Losses; ERA = Earned run average; SO = Strikeouts

| Player | G | IP | W | L | ERA | SO |
|---|---|---|---|---|---|---|
| Johnny Podres | 39 | 210.1 | 13 | 15 | 3.72 | 143 |
| Stan Williams | 27 | 119.0 | 9 | 7 | 4.01 | 80 |
| Danny McDevitt | 13 | 48.1 | 2 | 6 | 7.45 | 26 |
| Bob Giallombardo | 6 | 26.1 | 1 | 1 | 3.76 | 14 |

==== Other pitchers ====
Note: G = Games pitched; IP = Innings pitched; W = Wins; L = Losses; ERA = Earned run average; SO = Strikeouts

| Player | G | IP | W | L | ERA | SO |
|---|---|---|---|---|---|---|
| Don Drysdale | 44 | 211.2 | 12 | 13 | 4.17 | 131 |
| Sandy Koufax | 40 | 158.2 | 11 | 11 | 4.48 | 131 |
| Fred Kipp | 40 | 102.1 | 6 | 6 | 5.01 | 58 |
| Carl Erskine | 31 | 98.1 | 4 | 4 | 5.13 | 54 |
| Don Newcombe | 11 | 34.1 | 0 | 6 | 7.86 | 16 |
| Roger Craig | 9 | 32.0 | 2 | 1 | 4.50 | 16 |
| Ralph Mauriello | 3 | 11.2 | 1 | 1 | 4.63 | 11 |

==== Relief pitchers ====
Note: G = Games pitched; W = Wins; L = Losses; SV = Saves; ERA = Earned run average; SO = Strikeouts

| Player | G | W | L | SV | ERA | SO |
|---|---|---|---|---|---|---|
| Clem Labine | 52 | 6 | 6 | 14 | 4.15 | 43 |
| Johnny Klippstein | 45 | 3 | 5 | 9 | 3.80 | 73 |
| Ed Roebuck | 32 | 0 | 1 | 5 | 3.48 | 26 |
| Don Bessent | 19 | 1 | 0 | 0 | 3.33 | 13 |
| Babe Birrer | 16 | 0 | 0 | 1 | 4.50 | 16 |
| Larry Sherry | 5 | 0 | 0 | 0 | 12.46 | 2 |
| Ron Negray | 4 | 0 | 0 | 0 | 7.15 | 2 |
| Jackie Collum | 2 | 0 | 0 | 0 | 8.10 | 0 |

== Awards and honors ==
- Gold Glove Award
  - Gil Hodges

=== All-stars ===
- 1958 Major League Baseball All-Star Game
  - Johnny Podres reserve
  - John Roseboro reserve

== Farm system ==
| Level | Team | League | Manager |
|---|---|---|---|
| AAA | Montreal Royals | International League | Clay Bryant |
| AAA | St. Paul Saints | American Association | Max Macon |
| AA | Victoria Rosebuds | Texas League | Lou Rochelli |
| A | Macon Dodgers | South Atlantic League | Danny Ozark |
| A | Pueblo Dodgers | Western League | Ray Mueller |
| B | Green Bay Bluejays | Illinois–Indiana–Iowa League | Pete Reiser |
| C | Great Falls Electrics | Pioneer League | Stan Wasiak |
| C | Reno Silver Sox | California League | Ray Perry |
| D | Columbus Foxes | Alabama–Florida League | Brandy Davis |
| D | Kokomo Dodgers | Midwest League | Edward Serrano |
| D | Thomasville Dodgers | Georgia–Florida League | Rudy Rufer; Sam Suplizio |

LEAGUE CHAMPIONS: Montreal
