= Glenn Liebhardt =

Glenn Liebhardt may refer to:

- Glenn Liebhardt (1900s pitcher) (1883–1956), major league pitcher, 1906–09
- Glenn Liebhardt (1930s pitcher) (1910–1992), major league pitcher, 1930–38
