= 1956 in baseball =

The following are the baseball events of the year 1956 throughout the world.

== Champions ==
=== Major League Baseball ===
- World Series: New York Yankees over Brooklyn Dodgers (4–3); Don Larsen, MVP
- All-Star Game, July 10 at Griffith Stadium: National League, 7–3

=== Other champions ===
- College World Series: Minnesota
- Japan Series: Nishitetsu Lions over Yomiuri Giants (4–2)
- Little League World Series: Lions Hondo, Roswell, New Mexico
- Global World Series: United States

Winter Leagues

- 1956 Caribbean Series: Elefantes de Cienfuegos
- Cuban League: Elefantes de Cienfuegos
- Dominican Republic League: Leones del Escogido
- Mexican Pacific League: Tomateros de Culiacán
- Panamanian League: Chesterfield Smokers
- Puerto Rican League: Criollos de Caguas
- Venezuelan League: Industriales de Valencia

== Awards and honors ==
- Baseball Hall of Fame
  - Hank Greenberg
  - Joe Cronin
- Most Valuable Player
  - Don Newcombe (BRO, National)
  - Mickey Mantle (NYY, American)
- First Cy Young Award: Don Newcombe (BRO)
- Rookie of the Year
  - Frank Robinson (CIN, National)
  - Luis Aparicio (CWS, American)

== Statistical leaders ==
	American League		National League	
Stat	Player	Total	Player	Total
AVG	Mickey Mantle^{1} (NYY)	.353	Hank Aaron (MIL)	.328
HR	Mickey Mantle^{1} (NYY)	52	Duke Snider (BRO)	43
RBI	Mickey Mantle^{1} (NYY)	130	Stan Musial (STL)	109
W	Frank Lary (DET)	21	Don Newcombe (BRO)	27
ERA	Whitey Ford (NYY)	2.47	Lew Burdette (MIL)	2.70
K	Herb Score (CLE)	263	Sam Jones (CHC)	176

^{1} Major league Triple Crown batting winner

== Major league baseball final standings ==
=== American League final standings ===
American League
Team	W	L	Pct.	GB	Home	Road
New York Yankees	97	57	.630	—	49‍–‍28	48‍–‍29
Cleveland Indians	88	66	.571	9	46‍–‍31	42‍–‍35
Chicago White Sox	85	69	.552	12	46‍–‍31	39‍–‍38
Boston Red Sox	84	70	.545	13	43‍–‍34	41‍–‍36
Detroit Tigers	82	72	.532	15	37‍–‍40	45‍–‍32
Baltimore Orioles	69	85	.448	28	41‍–‍36	28‍–‍49
Washington Senators	59	95	.383	38	32‍–‍45	27‍–‍50
Kansas City Athletics	52	102	.338	45	22‍–‍55	30‍–‍47

Locations of teams for the 1955–1960 American League seasons
American League

=== National League final standings ===
National League
Team	W	L	Pct.	GB	Home	Road
Brooklyn Dodgers	93	61	.604	—	52‍–‍25	41‍–‍36
Milwaukee Braves	92	62	.597	1	47‍–‍29	45‍–‍33
Cincinnati Redlegs	91	63	.591	2	51‍–‍26	40‍–‍37
St. Louis Cardinals	76	78	.494	17	43‍–‍34	33‍–‍44
Philadelphia Phillies	71	83	.461	22	40‍–‍37	31‍–‍46
New York Giants	67	87	.435	26	37‍–‍40	30‍–‍47
Pittsburgh Pirates	66	88	.429	27	35‍–‍43	31‍–‍45
Chicago Cubs	60	94	.390	33	39‍–‍38	21‍–‍56

Locations of teams for the 1953–1957 National League seasons
National League

== Nippon Professional Baseball final standings ==
=== Central League final standings ===
Central League	G	W	L	T	Pct.	GB
Yomiuri Giants	130	82	44	4	.646	—
Osaka Tigers	130	79	50	1	.612	4.5
Chunichi Dragons	130	74	56	0	.569	10.0
Kokutetsu Swallows	130	61	65	4	.485	21.0
Hiroshima Carp	130	45	82	3	.358	27.5
Taiyo Whales	130	43	87	0	.331	41.0

=== Pacific League final standings ===
Pacific League	G	W	L	T	Pct.	GB
Nishitetsu Lions	154	96	51	7	.646	—
Nankai Hawks	154	96	52	6	.643	0.5
Hankyu Braves	154	88	64	2	.578	10.5
Mainichi Orions	154	84	66	4	.558	13.5
Kintetsu Pearls	154	68	82	4	.455	29.5
Toei Flyers	154	58	92	4	.390	39.5
Daiei Stars	154	57	94	3	.380	41.0
Takahashi Unions	154	52	98	4	.351	45.5

== Events ==
=== January ===
- January 26 – Slugger Hank Greenberg and hard-hitting shortstop Joe Cronin are elected to the Baseball Hall of Fame; Greenberg captures 85 percent of this year's Cooperstown vote, Cronin 78.8%.
- January 27 – In an ominous development for Upper Manhattan's venerable stadium, the Polo Grounds, its longtime autumn tenant, the New York Football Giants of the NFL, announce a ten-year agreement to play their games at Yankee Stadium in The Bronx. The "startling" announcement "freshens speculation" that the "Baseball Giants" will soon abandon the Polo Grounds as well—perhaps also sharing Yankee Stadium or even moving to Minneapolis. The land on which the stadium sits is expected to be redeveloped into housing by its owners, the Coogan Estate.
- January 31 – The Cincinnati Redlegs make the first multi-player trade of 1956, sending pitcher Jackie Collum to the St. Louis Cardinals for hurler Brooks Lawrence and infielder Sonny Senerchia. Lawrence will win his first 13 decisions of 1956—he won't be defeated until July 21—and 19 games overall, and be selected to the National League All-Star team.

=== February ===
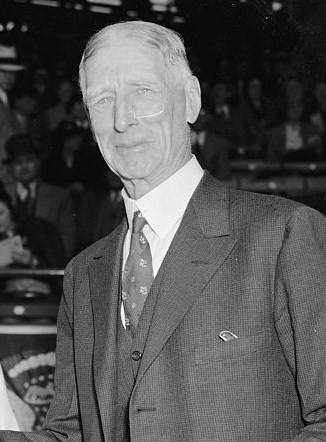
Connie Mack in 1938

- February 6 – Supporting the Wagner–Cashmore plan to build a $30-million downtown Brooklyn sports center, announced in August 1955, Brooklyn Dodgers owner Walter O'Malley promises to buy $4 million worth of bonds.
- February 8
  - The baseball world mourns Hall-of-Fame manager Connie Mack, following his death at age 93 in Philadelphia. Mack holds the all-time managerial records for MLB games managed (7,755), won (3,731) and lost (3,948). His Philadelphia Athletics won nine American League pennants and five World Series. (See Deaths entry for this date below.)
  - The defending American League champion New York Yankees acquire talented but erratic left-hander Mickey McDermott from the Washington Senators in a seven-player trade. In the deal, the Yanks also receive infielder Bobby Kline; in return, Washington gets pitcher Bob Wiesler, catcher Lou Berberet, infielder Herb Plews and outfielders Dick Tettelbach and Whitey Herzog (as a "PTBNL"). A one-time 18-game winner, McDermott will struggle (2–6, 4.24 ERA) in his only year as a Yankee.
  - The Boston Red Sox purchase the contract of shortstop Pumpsie Green, 22, from the Stockton Ports of the Class C California League and assign him to the Albany Senators of the Class A Eastern League. On July 21, 1959, Green will be the first Black player to appear in an official game for the Red Sox.
- February 15 – Cuba, represented by Cienfuegos, wins the eighth Caribbean Series, defeating Puerto Rico 4–2 and capturing its fifth win against one defeat in this year's tournament. Two Cuban hurlers who spend summers with the Washington Senators, right-handers Pedro Ramos and Camilo Pascual, go a combined 4–0 in the competition; catcher Ray Noble hits .400 and is named Series MVP.
- February 25 — The legendary Kansas City Monarchs are sold by Tom Baird to Negro leagues entrepreneur Ted Rasberry, who retains the team's full name but moves their operations to Grand Rapids, Michigan. After the arrival of the MLB Kansas City Athletics in 1955, the Monarchs were able to secure only two home dates at their longtime home, Blues Stadium, and faced an untenable rent increase. Rasberry will keep the Monarchs alive into 1965 as a full-time barnstorming team before they disband.
- February 27 – The Class B Piedmont League disbands after 37 years in operation.

=== March ===
- March 2 – The Brooklyn Dodgers sell the contract of left-handed pitcher Tommy Lasorda to the Kansas City Athletics. Although a mainstay for the Dodgers' Triple-A Montreal Royals farm team, Lasorda, 28, has appeared in only eight games for Brooklyn in 1954–1955. After an 18-game trial with the 1956 Athletics and a brief stint in the New York Yankees' system, Lasorda will return to the Dodgers' organization in May 1957 and eventually become their Baseball Hall of Fame manager in September 1976.
- March 3 – In an effort to keep the New York Giants in Manhattan, borough president Hulan Jack proposes a new, 110,000-seat stadium over the New York Central railroad tracks on a 470,000-foot site stretching from 60th to 72nd streets on Manhattan's West Side.
- March 30 – The Chicago Cubs trade Hank Sauer to the St. Louis Cardinals for Pete Whisenant in an all-outfielder transaction. Sauer, 39, slugged 198 home runs in 6½ years as a Cub, and was elected 1952 National League MVP.

=== April ===
- April 9 – The Milwaukee Braves trade first baseman George Crowe to the Cincinnati Redlegs for outfielder Bob "Hurricane" Hazle and pitcher Corky Valentine (PTBNL).
- April 10 – The proposed new stadium project for Manhattan's West Side gains traction when New York Giants owner Horace Stoneham offers initial support for the plan outlined by borough president Hulan Jack. The massive stadium—which will seat 110,000 and sit on stilts located above New York Central Railroad yards—currently is estimated to cost $20 million, with no public financing required.
- April 17 – Opening Day in Major League Baseball sees a full slate of eight games. In the traditional Presidential Opener at Griffith Stadium, the New York Yankees humble the Washington Senators 10–4 behind two home runs from Mickey Mantle and one from Yogi Berra. In the National League's traditional opener at Crosley Field, the visiting St. Louis Cardinals top the Cincinnati Redlegs 4–2, with Stan Musial's two-run, ninth-inning blast off Joe Nuxhall sealing the Redbird victory.
- April 19 – The defending World Series champion Brooklyn Dodgers play the first of seven 1956 home games at Roosevelt Stadium in Jersey City, New Jersey—a gambit devised by owner Walter O'Malley to pressure New York City officials to support his plan to build a new stadium to replace the Dodgers' 43-year-old Flatbush ballpark, Ebbets Field. On a cold and windy day, they defeat the Philadelphia Phillies, 5–4 in ten innings, before 12,124 fans.
- April 21 – At Municipal Stadium, Art Ditmar throws a one-hitter and his lowly Kansas City Athletics erupt for a 13-hit, 13-run second inning en route to a 15–1 thrashing of the Chicago White Sox. Earl Battey's fourth-inning single is the ChiSox' only safety, and the run off Ditmar is unearned. Ditmar's is the first of four one-hitters to be hurled in the majors this season.
- April 22 – The Philadelphia Phillies manage just three hits, but one of them is a three-run home run by Ted Kazanski, as Robin Roberts wins, 3–1, over Johnny Antonelli and the New York Giants.
- April 26 – Alfonso "Chico" Carrasquel goes 2-for-4, including a grand slam home run, and drives home a career-high seven runs, to guide the Cleveland Indians to a crushing 14–2 victory over the Kansas City Athletics. Early Wynn pitches a nine-strikeout, four-hit complete game to earn the victory.
- April 29 – Del Ennis' infield single with one out in the first inning is the only hit allowed by Ramón Monzant of the New York Giants, as the Venezuelan right-hander shuts down the Philadelphia Phillies, 8–1, at Polo Grounds.

=== May ===
- May 2 – At Wrigley Field, the New York Giants defeat the Chicago Cubs, 6–5, in a 17-inning game (the National League's longest game by innings this season). Forty-eight players see action — 25 Giants and 23 Cubs. Chicago's Don Hoak sets a National League record by striking out six times in the game, which also features a record 11 intentional walks, including two each to the Giants' Willie Mays and Wes Westrum and the Cubs' Ernie Banks. Chicago reliever Jim Brosnan, the losing pitcher, issues four intentional passes in two innings of work.
- May 11 – Five pitchers are involved in the five-player trade between the 5–13 Philadelphia Phillies and 13–6 St. Louis Cardinals. The scuffling Phils send right-handers Murry Dickson and Herm Wehmeier to the high-flying Cards for southpaw Harvey Haddix and righties Ben Flowers and Stu Miller.
- May 12 – Carl Erskine tosses the second no-hitter of his career as the Brooklyn Dodgers blank the Giants, 3–0, at Ebbets Field. His first no-hitter came on June 19, 1952 against the Chicago Cubs, also at Ebbets Field.
- May 14
  - The St. Louis Cardinals deal shortstop Solly Hemus, 33, to the Philadelphia Phillies for infielder Bobby Morgan. Hemus writes a letter to August A. Busch Jr. expressing his pride at having been a Cardinal that impresses the St. Louis owner so much, he decides, in September 1958, to reacquire Hemus and make him his player-manager.
  - The Brooklyn Dodgers sell the contract of right-hander Billy Loes to the Baltimore Orioles for $20,000. Only 26, Loes has been plagued by inconsistency during his six years as a Dodger.
- May 15 – Brooklyn acquires 39-year-old right-hander Sal "The Barber" Maglie from the Cleveland Indians. Once despised as an infamous "headhunter" as the ace starting pitcher of the arch-rival New York Giants, Maglie will help pitch the 1956 Dodgers to the National League pennant.
- May 17 – In one of general manager "Frantic" Frank Lane's worst trades, the St. Louis Cardinals deal outfielder and 1955 National League Rookie of the Year Bill Virdon to the Pittsburgh Pirates for pitcher Dick Littlefield and outfielder Bobby Del Greco. Virdon will patrol center field in Pittsburgh for almost a decade, win a Gold Glove and a World Series ring.

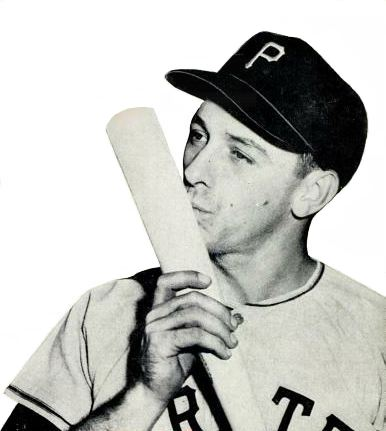
Dale Long in 1956

- May 19 – Dale Long, first baseman of the Pittsburgh Pirates, hits his seventh home run of 1956 in the eighth inning of a 7–4 victory over the Chicago Cubs at Wrigley Field. The two-run blast is the first of Long's MLB-record eight home runs in eight consecutive games.
- May 21 – Frank Lane's former team, the Chicago White Sox, do a six-player swap with the Baltimore Orioles, sending pitchers Mike Fornieles and Connie Johnson, future Hall-of-Fame third baseman George Kell and outfielder Bob Nieman to Baltimore for pitcher Jim Wilson and outfielder Dave Philley.
- May 23
  - While insisting he is "very much interested" in a new, 110,000-seat stadium for Manhattan's West Side that would keep the New York Giants in his city, mayor Robert F. Wagner Jr. qualifies his endorsement by citing the estimated cost of the project—which has risen from $20 million to $75 million ($907.4 million in 2025) during the past six weeks. Spiraling costs of the massive project lead to its demise—and the Giants' mid-1957 decision to abandon New York for San Francisco.
  - At Kansas City's Municipal Stadium, two second-division teams battle into the 17th inning, tied 5–5. The visiting Washington Senators break through in the top of the frame when rookie Whitey Herzog doubles home Roy Sievers for a 6–5 lead. Then, in the bottom half, the Athletics come back to tie on a homer by Jim Finigan, then win the contest when Camilo Pascual uncorks a wild pitch. The 17-inning game will be the AL's longest extra-inning tilt in 1956.
- May 26
  - Cincinnati Redlegs starting pitcher Johnny Klippstein (seven innings) and relievers Hersh Freeman (one inning) and Joe Black (12/3) combine to throw 92/3 hitless frames against the Milwaukee Braves before Braves second baseman Jack Dittmer doubles to break the streak. The Braves collect two more hits in the 11th and win the contest 2–1 at County Stadium. Winning hurler Ray Crone tosses a complete-game, seven-hitter.
  - Baseball Hall of Fame slugger Al Simmons dies in Milwaukee from an apparent heart attack at the age of 54. (See Deaths entry for this date below.)
- May 28
  - At Forbes Field, Dale Long slugs his 14th home run of 1956 off the Brooklyn Dodgers' Carl Erskine in the fourth inning of the Pittsburgh Pirates' 3–2 triumph. Long has now homered (once) in eight consecutive National League games—an NL record that still endures, although tied twice in the American League—as part of a red-hot start: he's batting .411 with 52 hits and 38 runs batted in in 34 games.
  - Left-hander Tommy Lasorda of the Kansas City Athletics issues ten bases on balls is 82/3 innings pitched against the visiting Chicago White Sox, but leaves with a 4–2 lead. The ten walks are the most in a game by any MLB hurler in 1956. Reliever Moe Burtschy then gives up two inherited runners to deny Lasorda the chance for his first (and only) MLB pitching victory. Burtschy retires the side, then earns the win himself when Enos Slaughter clouts a two-run walk-off homer in the Athletics' half of the ninth inning.
- May 30
  - Mickey Mantle of the New York Yankees narrowly misses hitting the first home run ever hit completely out of Yankee Stadium. With Hank Bauer and Gil McDougald on base in the fifth inning of Game One of a doubleheader against the Washington Senators, Mantle, batting left-handed against Pedro Ramos, hits a towering drive above the level of the stadium roof. However, a stiff wind cuts down the ball, which strikes the right-field facade, 18 inches (460 mm) above the level of the roof. The home run gives the Yankees a 3–1 lead; they go on to win 4–3.
  - The Chicago Cubs and Milwaukee Braves split a Memorial Day doubleheader at Wrigley Field (Cubs win 10–9, then Braves take the nightcap 11–9). The teams combine for 15 home runs, with the Braves' Bobby Thomson blasting four round-trippers all by himself.
    - In the first inning of the opening game of the twin bill, the Cubs' Russ Meyer beans the Braves' Bill Bruton after "the Mad Monk" gives up consecutive solo homers to Eddie Mathews, Hank Aaron and Thomson. Bruton charges the mound, the benches clear, and he and Meyer are ejected.

=== June ===
- June 14 – St. Louis Cardinals general manager Frank Lane pulls off a patented blockbuster trade, in concert with New York Giants owner Horace Stoneham. Ten players are involved, as the Cardinals send pitchers Dick Littlefield and Gordon Jones (PTBNL), catcher Bill Sarni, future Baseball Hall of Fame second baseman Red Schoendienst, shortstop Bob Stephenson (PTBNL), and outfielder Jackie Brandt to the Giants for pitcher Don Liddle, catcher Ray Katt, shortstop Alvin Dark, outfielder Whitey Lockman, and cash.
- June 16 – The Milwaukee Braves, only 5–12 during the month of June, replace manager Charlie Grimm with coach Fred Haney. The Braves are 24–22, four games behind the surprising Pittsburgh Pirates in the NL race.
- June 19 – In New Jersey, the city of Hoboken dedicates a plaque honoring the achievements of Alexander Cartwright in organizing early baseball games at Elysian Fields, at ceremonies marking the 100th anniversary of the first game played using modern rules.
- June 21 – Jack Harshman of the Chicago White Sox defeats Connie Johnson of the Baltimore Orioles 1–0 in a game in which both pitchers throw a one-hitter. Each "spoiler" is a double; Nellie Fox's blow scores Jim Rivera with the game's only run in the White Sox' first, but Gus Triandos is snuffed out on a fielder's choice at third base in the Baltimore seventh.
- June 25 – Rallying for three ninth-inning runs to break a five-all tie, the Milwaukee Braves defeat the Philadelphia Phillies 8–5 at Connie Mack Stadium for their 11th victory without a loss since Fred Haney became manager June 17. In nine days, they've moved from fifth place to first in the National League, and they lead the second-place Cincinnati Redlegs by two full games.
- June 27 – Chico Carrasquel scores two runs and goes 5-for-6, including two doubles and a game-ending RBI single in the 11th inning off Don Mossi, as the Cleveland Indians edge the Baltimore Orioles 12–11. Skinny Brown is the winning pitcher in a 6 1/3-inning relief effort.
- June 28 – The Detroit Tigers (28–36–1, sixth in the AL) defeat the Kansas City Athletics, 4–0, to break an eleven-game winless streak (ten losses and one tie). But "fed up" owner Walter Briggs Jr.—who is being forced to sell the team—continues to lash out at his organization, from general manager Muddy Ruel to manager Bucky Harris, the club's coaches, and its playing roster. One coach, Joe Gordon, quits his post. Although Briggs' tirade doesn't have the desired effect (the Tigers' low point will occur July 6 with a 14–0 loss to the Chicago White Sox), Detroit will go 37–19 during August and September to finish 82–72–1, its best record since 1950.

=== July ===
- July 1 – At Busch Stadium, the slugging Cincinnati Redlegs sweep the homestanding St. Louis Cardinals in a doubleheader, 19–15 (ten innings) and 7–1, to climb into a virtual first-place tie with the Milwaukee Braves. The Redlegs are actually outhit by the Redbirds, 30 to 29, on the day, but Cincinnati smashes seven homers—including three by first baseman Ted Kluszewski in the opening contest. The Redlegs will belt 221 homers in 155 games in 1956, tying the National League and MLB records.
- July 10 – At Griffith Stadium, home of the Washington Senators, the National League tops the American League, 7–3, in the All-Star Game. Willie Mays, Stan Musial, Ted Williams and Mickey Mantle all hit home runs.

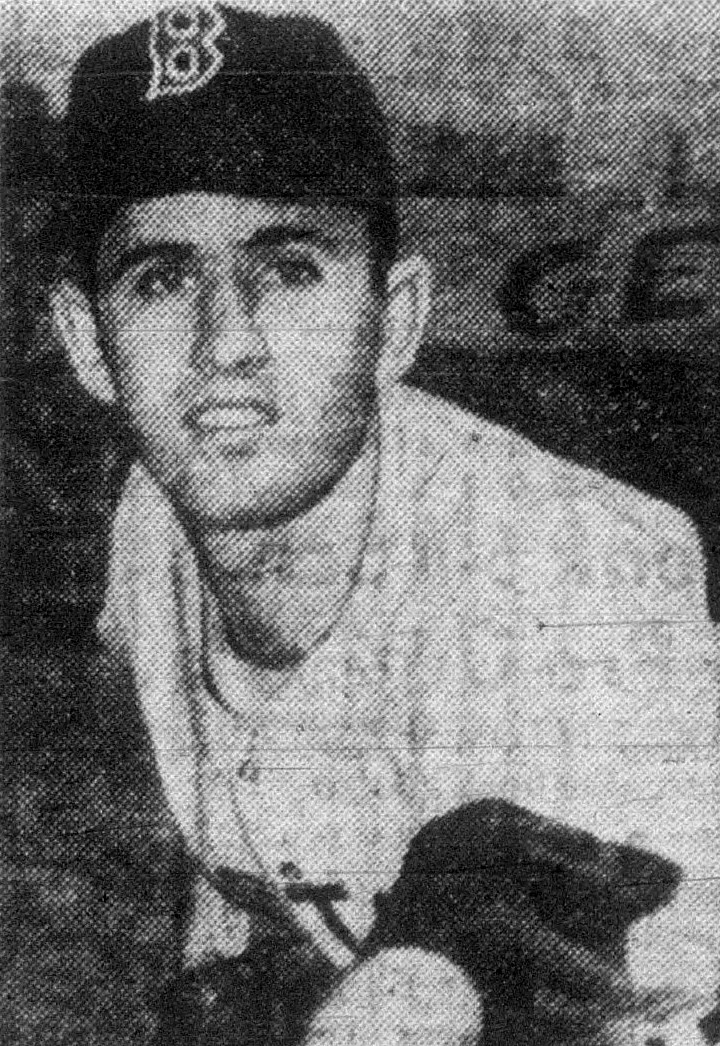
Mel Parnell in 1949

- July 14 – At Fenway Park, Mel Parnell of the Boston Red Sox no-hits the Chicago White Sox 4–0. The no-hitter is the Red Sox' first since Howard Ehmke in 1923, the first at Fenway since the Washington Senators' Walter Johnson no-hit the Red Sox in 1920, and the first by a Red Sox left-hander since Hubert "Dutch" Leonard in 1918.
- July 17
  - An 11-member group of Michigan investors, led by broadcasters John Fetzer and Fred Knorr, purchase the Detroit Tigers and Briggs Stadium from a family trust co-administered by Walter Briggs Jr. and Detroit Bank & Trust Co. The deal is worth $5.5 million and takes effect October 1.
  - Tom Brewer and Bob Porterfield throw complete-game shutouts, as the Boston Red Sox sweep the Kansas City Athletics, 10–0 and 1–0, in a Fenway Park doubleheader.
  - The Chicago Cubs outlast the Philadelphia Phillies, 3–2, in 16 innings at Wrigley Field. Don Hoak hits three doubles and scores the winning run on a single by Gene Baker.
- July 25 – Roberto Clemente of the Pittsburgh Pirates hits the first, and so far only, walk-off inside-the park grand slam in major league history in a 9–8 win over the Chicago Cubs.
- July 27 – In a 14-inning affair at Municipal Stadium, the Kansas City Athletics outhit the New York Yankees, 26 to 16, but lose 10–9 on two errors and an unearned run. The result spoils five-hit nights for both Héctor López and Vic Power, and a four-hit game for Lou Skizas.
- July 29 – The Cleveland Indians sell the contract of 11-year veteran outfielder/pinch hitter Dale Mitchell to the Brooklyn Dodgers. Mitchell, 34, batted .312 in 1,127 games in a Cleveland uniform. Mitchell will collect seven hits in 24 plate appearances for Brooklyn during the NL pennant race's final two months, and will be immortalized in his penultimate career at bat when, in Game 5 of the 1956 World Series, he is the 27th batter to face Don Larsen in the Yankee hurler's bid for a perfect game.

=== August ===
- August 2 – Herb Score shuts out the visiting New York Yankees‚ 4–0‚ for the Cleveland Indians' seventh shutout in their last 12 games. Bobby Ávila gets the Indians on board with an inside-the-park home run in the third inning. An inning later, Preston Ward and Rocky Colavito hit back-to-back home runs and one out later Chico Carrasquel homers. The four solo homers in a shutout victory sets a major league record. Yankees starter Tom Sturdivant, who surrendered the four homers, is the losing pitcher.
- August 7 – Fenway Park fans boo Boston Red Sox left-fielder Ted Williams for dropping Mickey Mantle's "routine" fly ball for a two-base error in the 11th inning of a scoreless tie against the New York Yankees. Williams then makes a difficult catch of a Yogi Berra line drive to keep Mantle from scoring and end the threat. As Williams trots off the field after the third out, he spits at the fans seated behind the Red Sox dugout, then spits at the reporters in the press box above home plate. Owner Tom Yawkey fines Williams $5,000 for what the press term the slugger's "Great Expectorations." That the Red Sox win the contest 1–0 on Williams' bases-loaded walk in the home half of the 11th is almost an afterthought.
- August 8 – Robin Roberts wins his eighth straight game and his fourth in 10 days‚ as the visiting Philadelphia Phillies defeat the New York Giants‚ 9–3. Phillies shortstop Ted Kazanski lines an inside-the-park grand slam off Jim Hearn‚ just the fourth in club history, to pace the attack.
- August 12 – At Wrigley Field, the St. Louis Cardinals and Chicago Cubs battle to a nine-inning scoreless tie in the second game of a doubleheader when the game is "called on account of darkness." Wrigley is the only MLB stadium without arc lights. Herm Wehmeier and Jim Davis are credited with complete-game shutouts. The game will replayed in full on September 25.
- August 18 – The homer-happy Cincinnati Redlegs continue their assault on National League foes, slugging eight round-trippers in a 13–4 rout of the Milwaukee Braves at Crosley Field. Bob Thurman belts three homers, while Frank Robinson and Ted Kluszewski hit two each. Wally Post contributes with one blast. Thurman's is the fourth three-homer day by a Cincinnati hitter in 1956: earlier, Gus Bell (May 29), Ed Bailey (June 24) and Kluszewski (July 1) had joined the three-blast club.
- August 25 – The New York Yankees claim veteran outfielder and future Hall-of-Famer Enos Slaughter, 40, on waivers from the Kansas City Athletics. Slaughter will appear in three consecutive World Series (1956–1958) in his second tour of duty for the Yanks. On the same day, they release Hall of Fame shortstop Phil Rizzuto, a 13-year veteran.

=== September ===
- September 3 – After the Labor Day doubleheaders are played, the Milwaukee Braves hold a 3½-game lead, their largest margin of the month, over the Cincinnati Redlegs and Brooklyn Dodgers in the National League standings.
- September 18 – In the 11th inning at Comiskey Park, Mickey Mantle blasts his 50th home run of 1956, providing the winning margin in a 3–2 triumph over the Chicago White Sox and clinching the New York Yankees' 22nd American League pennant.
- September 20 – Baltimore Orioles second-year catcher Tom Gastall, 24, dies when the private plane he is piloting crashes into Chesapeake Bay.
- September 21 – The New York Yankees set a Major League record by leaving 20 runners on base in a 13–7 loss against the Boston Red Sox at Fenway Park.
- September 23 – Don Newcombe wins his 26th game of 1956, defeating the Pittsburgh Pirates 8–3 and enabling the Brooklyn Dodgers to keep pace with the Milwaukee Braves in the see-saw National League pennant race. The two teams have been running neck-and-neck since September 15, with the Cincinnati Redlegs close behind them.
- September 25
  - At Crosley Field, the third-place Cincinnati Redlegs (now 89–63–1) are eliminated from the NL pennant chase, as they drop a 7–1 decision to the Milwaukee Braves and Warren Spahn, who wins his 20th game in the process. Milwaukee bangs out 15 hits off six Cincinnati pitchers.
  - At Ebbets Field, Sal Maglie of the Brooklyn Dodgers no-hits the Philadelphia Phillies 5–0. The Dodgers (90–60) continue to trail the Braves (91–60–1) by a half-game.
- September 29
  - The St. Louis Cardinals' Herm Wehmeier deals a crucial setback to the Milwaukee Braves (91–62–1), throwing a 12-inning, complete-game, 2–1 victory to defeat Warren Spahn at Busch Stadium.
  - Meanwhile, the Brooklyn Dodgers (92–61) vault into first place in the Senior Circuit by sweeping a doubleheader from the Pittsburgh Pirates at Ebbets Field, 6–2 and 3–1, behind the hurling of Sal Maglie and Clem Labine.
  - Days after criticizing the booing of veteran third baseman Al Rosen by hometown fans—and apparently at odds with general manager Hank Greenberg—Al López resigns as manager of the Cleveland Indians. In six seasons, López has won one pennant and finished second five times, compiling the best winning percentage in Indians' history (570–354, .617). During the next six seasons, through 1962, the team will employ six different managers as it sinks in the American League standings.

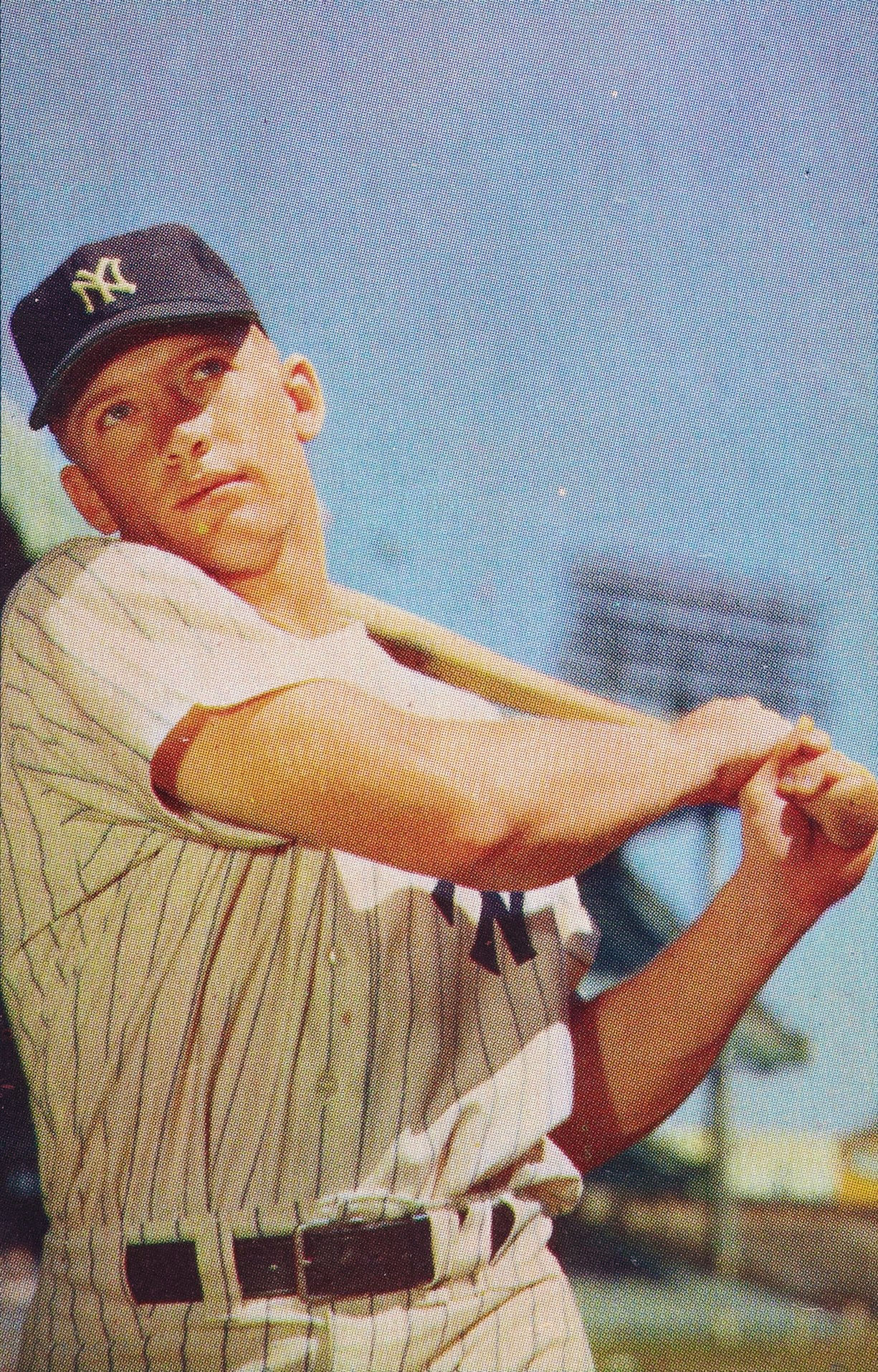
Mickey Mantle (c. 1953)

- September 30
  - The Brooklyn Dodgers (93–61) repeat as National League champions, defeating the Pittsburgh Pirates 8–6 behind Don Newcombe's 27th triumph and four home runs—two by outfielder Sandy Amorós. The Milwaukee Braves (92–62–1) and Cincinnati Redlegs (91–63–1) also win to finish second and third, one and two games, respectively, behind. Brooklyn's ninth NL pennant sets up another World Series matchup with the New York Yankees—the seventh since 1941.
  - In the ninth inning at Yankee Stadium, pinch hitter Mickey Mantle bats for pitcher Jim Coates and hits into a fielder's choice to drive in the game's tying run against the Boston Red Sox. The RBI is Mantle's 130th of 1956 and caps his Triple Crown season in which he also leads the American League in home runs (52) and batting average (.353).
  - Chicago White Sox pitcher Jim Derrington becomes the youngest pitcher in modern history to start a game. He loses to the Kansas City Athletics, 7–6, at the age of 16 years and 10 months.
  - The 29-year managerial career of Bucky Harris comes to an end when he parts company with the Detroit Tigers. Harris, 59, began as the "Boy Wonder" player–manager of the 1924 World Series champion Washington Senators and followed that in 1925 with an American League pennant. Then, in mid-career, he led the 1947 New York Yankees to a World Series title. But 16 of his 29 teams finished with losing records, and his final tally is 2,158–2,219 (.493) in 4,410 games. He will be elected to the Baseball Hall of Fame in 1975.

=== October ===
- October 8 – New York Yankees pitcher Don Larsen pitches a perfect game in Game 5 of the World Series against the Brooklyn Dodgers, in a 2–0 victory. It is only the fourth perfect game since 1900 and sixth in the history of Major League Baseball. To date it remains the only perfect game in baseball post-season history, and also the only single pitcher no-hitter in the World Series.
- October 9 – The Dodgers bounce back. Brooklyn's Clem Labine comes out of the bullpen to pitch a 1–0 victory in Game 6 of the World Series. Yankee Enos Slaughter misjudges Jackie Robinson's fly ball, and Jim Gilliam scores from second base; it turned out to be Robinson's last major league hit. The series is tied at three games apiece.
- October 10 – The New York Yankees defeat the Brooklyn Dodgers, 9–0, in Game 7 of the World Series to win their 17th World Series championship, four games to three. Johnny Kucks goes the distance in the victory, allowing only three hits. Yogi Berra hits a pair of two-run home runs and Bill Skowron belts a grand slam. Don Newcombe takes the loss, his fourth in Series competition. It was the last World Series game played at Brooklyn's Ebbets Field. Yankees pitcher Don Larsen is named Most Valuable Player.
- October 11 – Chicago Cubs owner Philip K. Wrigley accepts the resignations of VP/player personnel Wid Matthews, business manager James T. Gallagher and field manager Stan Hack. Their replacements are three veterans of the Chicago organization: Charlie Grimm, two-time Cubs' manager (1932–1938, 1944–1949) who also played first base for them (1926–1937), and John Holland, general manager of the Los Angeles Angels of the Pacific Coast League, who are named vice presidents; and former Cub catcher and coach Bob Scheffing, who is named 1957's field manager. Like Holland, Scheffing is promoted from the PCL Angels, who won 107 games and a pennant in 1956.
- October 12 – On his way to Tokyo, Brooklyn Dodgers owner Walter O'Malley makes a stop in Southern California for a meeting with Kenneth Hahn of the Los Angeles County Board of Supervisors and other politicians who are trying to bring Major League Baseball to the "City of Angels." It is O'Malley's first visit to Los Angeles—but it kicks off a rapidly accelerating courtship that, slightly less than a year later, results in the Dodgers' relocation to the West Coast.
- October 17 – The Detroit Tigers promote first-base coach Jack Tighe to manager for 1957. Tighe, 43, never played in the majors but is a former catcher and manager in the Tiger farm system.
- October 24 – The Sporting News names Birdie Tebbetts MLB Manager of the Year. Tebbetts' 1956 Cincinnati Redlegs improved by 16 games over 1955's edition and missed the National League pennant by only two games.
- October 25 – Chicago White Sox manager Marty Marion resigns in the wake of a third-place finish and criticism from general manager Chuck Comiskey. Four days later, former Cleveland pilot Al López will replace him; in his third season, López will guide the 1959 White Sox to their first American League flag in 40 years.
- October 26 – The New York Giants sign veteran slugger Hank Sauer, released by the St. Louis Cardinals. Sauer, at age 40, will make a comeback with the Giants in 1957, hitting 26 homers, tenth in the National League.
- October 30 – The Brooklyn Dodgers sell Ebbets Field, their home since 1913, to real-estate developer Marvin Kratter for a price later revealed to be $3 million. The Dodgers will lease the ballpark from Kratter in 1957, with options to return for the next two seasons, but The New York Times warns that "the demise of Ebbets Field" has come "a step nearer reality."

=== November ===
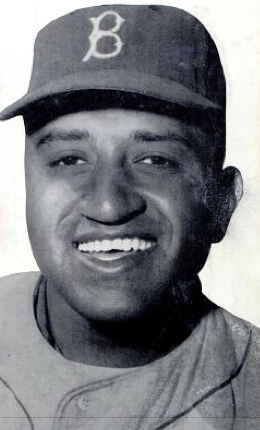
NL MVP and MLB Cy Young Award winner Don Newcombe

- November 12 – Triple-Crown winner and World Series champion Mickey Mantle is the unanimous winner of the 1956 American League Most Valuable Player Award with 24 out of 24 first-place votes. Eight days later, 27-game-winner Don Newcombe garners 66 percent of the votes to take the National League Most Valuable Player Award; fellow Dodger pitcher Sal Maglie, with 54%, runs second.
- November 13 – The Cincinnati Redlegs acquire pitcher Warren Hacker, third baseman Don Hoak and outfielder Pete Whisenant from the Chicago Cubs for pitcher Elmer Singleton and third baseman Ray Jablonski.
- November 19 – The Philadelphia Phillies trade veteran left-fielder Del Ennis to the St. Louis Cardinals for infielder Bobby Morgan and outfielder Rip Repulski. Native Philadelphian, three-time All-Star and former "Whiz Kid" Ennis has played 11 seasons and smashed 259 homers for the Phillies, but has fallen out of favor with his hometown fans.
- November 27
  - NL MVP Don Newcombe, who posted a 27–7 record with 139 strikeouts and a 3.06 ERA for the National League champion Brooklyn Dodgers, adds to his trophy case, becoming the first winner of the MLB Cy Young Award. Only one hurler will be selected each season for this prestigious pitching award until 1967, when each league will have its own winner.
  - Outfielder Charlie Peete, expected to get a good shot at becoming the first Black starter on the St. Louis Cardinals, is killed in a plane crash in Caracas, Venezuela. Peete, 27, who hit .192 in 23 games for St. Louis in 1956, was playing winter ball. His wife and three young children also die in the crash.
- November 28 – The Cleveland Indians name Kerby Farrell to succeed Al López as its manager for 1957. Farrell won the Junior World Series as the pilot of Cleveland's top farm team, Triple-A Indianapolis.

=== December ===
- December 1 – Outfielder Frank Robinson of the Cincinnati Redlegs unanimously wins the National League Rookie of the Year Award. In the American League, Chicago White Sox shortstop Luis Aparicio takes the award with 22 points, beating out outfielders Tito Francona of the Baltimore Orioles and Rocky Colavito of the Cleveland Indians.
- December 10 – A new generation assumes ownership of the Chicago White Sox upon the death of Grace Reidy Comiskey. Her will leaves 54 percent of the club to daughter Dorothy Comiskey Rigney, 39, and the remaining 46% to son Chuck, 31. Unhappy with his minority stake, Chuck takes his sister to court in 1957—but he fails to gain control of the team. In 1959, investors led by Bill Veeck acquire Dorothy's majority share; then, in 1961, a separate investor group buys Chuck's 46% share, ending the Comiskey family's ownership of the franchise, which predates the founding of the American League in 1901.
- December 11 – In an eight-player trade, the Chicago Cubs send pitchers Jim Davis and Sam "Toothpick" Jones, catcher Hobie Landrith and utilityman Eddie Miksis to the St. Louis Cardinals for pitchers Jackie Collum and Tom Poholsky, catcher Ray Katt, and minor-league infielder Wally Lammers.
- December 13 – Shocking fans in New York City and around the sporting world, the Brooklyn Dodgers trade future Hall-of-Famer Jackie Robinson, 37, to their biggest rivals, the New York Giants, for journeyman left-handed pitcher Dick Littlefield and $30,000. Robinson's offensive production (.266, 18 HR, 79 RBI) has declined in his two most recent seasons and he has been moved to third base and left field in Brooklyn's lineup. Slightly more than three weeks later, the trade will be cancelled when Robinson announces his retirement as an active player.
- December 18 – Future Hall of Fame shortstop Phil Rizzuto is hired as a broadcaster for the New York Yankees and he will hold his new position for the next four decades.

== Births ==
=== January ===
- January 10 – Dan Rohn
- January 12 – Juan Bonilla
- January 15
  - Don Cooper
  - Rance Mulliniks
  - Jerry Narron
- January 25 – Dale Mohorcic
- January 30 – Bill Earley

=== February ===
- February 1 – Geoff Combe
- February 2 – Manny Sarmiento
- February 4 – Chris Bando
- February 9 – Mookie Wilson
- February 12 – Brian Denman
- February 14 – Dave Dravecky
- February 15 – Ray Cosey
- February 16 – Takayoshi Nakao
- February 22 – Joe Lefebvre
- February 24 – Eddie Murray
- February 25
  - Kevin Hickey
  - Ed Lynch
- February 29 – Jerry Fry

=== March ===
- March 3 – Dennis Sherrill
- March 12 – Dale Murphy
- March 14 – Butch Wynegar
- March 16 – Juan Espino
- March 17
  - Rick Lisi
  - Tim Lollar
  - Rod Scurry
- March 23
  - Mike Darr
  - Ron Johnson
- March 24 – Garry Templeton
- March 27 – Dave Hostetler
- March 30 – Jack Lazorko

=== April ===
- April 1 – Mark Esser
- April 3 – Darrell Jackson
- April 4 – Tom Herr
- April 8 – Roger Holt
- April 11 – John Martin
- April 12 – Jose Alvarez
- April 14 – Bobby Sprowl
- April 15 – Barry Cort
- April 20
  - Floyd Chiffer
  - Tim Tolman
- April 22 – Moose Haas
- April 25 – Larry Pashnick

=== May ===
- May 4
  - Ubaldo Heredia
  - Ken Oberkfell
- May 5 – Ron Oester
- May 6 – Alberto Lois
- May 18 – Jim Farr
- May 19
  - Luis Salazar
  - Eric Show
- May 22 – Mark Brouhard
- May 23 – Buck Showalter
- May 27
  - Bud Anderson
  - Mark Clear
- May 28 – Randy Martz
- May 30
  - Dana DeMuth
  - Mike LaCoss
  - Jay Loviglio

=== June ===
- June 2 – Kelvin Chapman
- June 3 – Julio Valdez
- June 4 – Terry Kennedy
- June 9 – John Fulgham
- June 10
  - Brad Gulden
  - Randy Johnson
- June 11 – Joe Alvarez
- June 14 – Mike Grace
- June 15 – Lance Parrish
- June 20 – Larry Monroe
- June 21 – Rick Sutcliffe
- June 23 – Tony Johnson
- June 24 – George Vukovich
- June 29 – Pedro Guerrero

=== July ===
- July 3 – Larry Whisenton
- July 5 – Rick Lancellotti
- July 6 – Jang Hyo-jo
- July 7 – Terry Bevington
- July 8 – Terry Puhl
- July 9 – Guy Hoffman
- July 10 – Vance McHenry
- July 11 – Joey McLaughlin
- July 12
  - Bryan Clark
  - Mario Soto
- July 13 – Bill Caudill
- July 17 – Pete Ladd
- July 18
  - Butch Edge
  - Razor Shines
- July 22 – Scott Sanderson
- July 25 – Dave Patterson
- July 29 – Jeff Jones
- July 31 – Gordie Pladson

=== August ===
- August 2
  - Derek Botelho
  - Roger LaFrançois
- August 5
  - Dave Edler
  - Dave Rozema
- August 8 – Cliff Speck
- August 12 – Bobby Bonner
- August 19
  - Ron Roenicke
  - Kevin Saucier
- August 20 – Joel Finch
- August 21 – John Henry Johnson
- August 22
  - Mark Gilbert
  - Paul Molitor
- August 24
  - Tony Bernazard
  - Neil Fiala
- August 26 – George Bjorkman
- August 27 – Rick Steirer
- August 30
  - Steve Baker
  - Scott Brown
  - Roger Erickson
  - Willie Mueller

=== September ===
- September 2 – Fred Howard
- September 5 – Tom Hallion
- September 7 – Orlando Sánchez
- September 12 – Mark Thurmond
- September 15 – John Pacella
- September 17 – Thad Bosley
- September 20 – Mike Gates
- September 22 – Hiromichi Ishige
- September 24 – Hubie Brooks
- September 29 – Mark Calvert

=== October ===
- October 1 – Vance Law
- October 2 – Jeff Doyle
- October 3 – Bob Kearney
- October 4
  - Genji Kaku
  - Charlie Leibrandt
- October 6 – George Riley
- October 7 – Rudy Law
- October 8 – Jeff Lahti
- October 12 – Steve Shirley
- October 13 – Andy Beene
- October 16 – Dan Firova
- October 19 – Germán Barranca
- October 22 – Frank DiPino
- October 23 – Luis Silverio
- October 24 – Gary Serum
- October 25 – Andy McGaffigan

=== November ===
- November 1 – Gary Redus
- November 2 – Gary Hargis
- November 3 – Bob Welch
- November 11
  - Jeff Byrd
  - Scott Loucks
- November 12 – Jody Davis
- November 19 – Dickie Noles
- November 25 – Dave Baker
- November 26
  - Ron Meridith
  - Bob Walk
- November 29
  - Rick Anderson
  - Joe Price
- November 30 – Dave Engle

=== December ===
- December 1 – Tom Filer
- December 3 – Mark Bradley
- December 4 – Bárbaro Garbey
- December 5
  - Dave Hudgens
  - Bill Swaggerty
- December 7 – Ozzie Virgil
- December 8 – Alan Wirth
- December 9 – Eric Wilkins
- December 10 – Darrell Woodard
- December 12 – Steve Farr
- December 13
  - Dale Berra
  - Jon Perlman
- December 16 – Rick Sofield
- December 19
  - Stan Cliburn
  - Stew Cliburn
  - Tom Lawless
- December 22
  - Gary Cooper
  - Dave Schmidt
- December 23 – Bert Bradley
- December 25
  - Wallace Johnson
  - Charlie Lea
- December 29 – Dave Ford

== Deaths ==
=== January ===
- January 2 – Russ Dedeaux, 42, pitcher/outfielder who appeared for the Newark Eagles and New York Black Yankees (1941, 1946).
- January 4 – John Beckwith, 55, All-Star shortstop and manager in the Negro leagues, who spent over 20 years in baseball, ranking among the Negro leagues' career leaders in batting average, home runs, RBI and slugging percentage.
- January 7 – Davey Claire, 58, shortstop who appeared in three games for the Detroit Tigers in 1920.
- January 10 – Algie McBride, 86, outfielder for the Chicago Colts, Cincinnati Reds, and New York Giants from 1896 to 1901.
- January 22 − Ralph Mitterling, 65, outfielder for the Philadelphia Athletics during the 1916 season.
- January 23 – Billy Evans, 71, youngest umpire in MLB history when he joining the American League staff in 1906 at age 22; officiated in six World Series between 1909 and 1923; in 1927 retired from umpiring and became a front office executive, serving as general manager of the Cleveland Indians (1927–1935) and Detroit Tigers (1946–1951).
- January 26 – Dave Howard, 66, second baseman who played with the Washington Senators in the 1912 season and for the Brooklyn Tip-Tops in 1915.
- January 28 – Barry McCormick, 81, MLB player and umpire; versatile infielder who played in 989 games between 1895 and 1904 for four teams; as an umpire, officiated in three circuits: the 1914–1915 Federal League (then considered an "outlaw"), 1917 American League, and 1919–1929 National League, working in 1,981 regular season games and both the 1922 and 1925 World Series.
- January 31 – Buck Weaver, 65, shortstop and third baseman who played his entire career for the Chicago White Sox from 1912 to 1920, also a member of the 1917 World Series champion White Sox, then was one of the eight players banned from the Major Leagues for his connection to the 1919 Black Sox scandal.

=== February ===
- February 8
  - Roy Hitt, 71, pitcher for the 1907 Cincinnati Reds.
  - Tom Hughes, 77, pitcher for the Chicago Orphans at the turn of the 20th century as well as one of the first World Series pitchers ever, in 1903, with the Boston Americans champion team.
  - Connie Mack, 93, whose 65 years in baseball began as a catcher with the Washington Nationals in 1886, later a manager and owner of the Philadelphia Athletics from 1901 through 1950, retiring with nine American League pennants, five World Series titles and a record 3,731 victories – a feat that is unlikely to ever be matched, being inducted to the Hall of Fame in 1937.
- February 11 – Joseph Myers, 73, pitcher for the Philadelphia Athletics during the 1905 season.
- February 13 – Fred Holmes, 77, first baseman and catcher who played with the New York Highlanders in the 1904 season and for the Chicago Cubs in 1904.
- February 14 – Bill Bishop, 55, pitcher who played for the Philadelphia Athletics during the 1921 season.
- February 17 – Kip Selbach, 83, solid defensive outfielder who played for six different teams in a span of 13 seasons from 1894 to 1906, posting an overall batting line of .293/.377/.412 and 334 stolen bases, while leading the National League with 22 triples in 1895.
- February 19 – Ray Demmitt, 72, backup outfielder who played with five teams in part of seven seasons spanning 1909–1919.
- February 23 – Pete Loos, 77, pitcher for the Philadelphia Athletics of the American League in its 1901 season.
- February 25 – Jack Lewis, 72, second baseman who played with the Boston Red Sox in 1911 and for the Pittsburgh Rebels of the outlaw Federal League from 1914 to 1915.

=== March ===
- March 1
  - Ed Heusser, 46, pitcher for four teams in nine seasons between 1935 and 1948, who led the National League pitchers with a 2.38 ERA in 1944.
  - Walt Miller, 72, pitcher who appeared in three games for the Brooklyn Dodgers in the 1911 season.
- March 2 – Fred Merkle, 67, slugging first baseman and part-time outfielder who was in the major leagues from 1907 through 1926, playing with the New York Giants, Brooklyn Dodgers, Chicago Cubs and New York Yankees, being best remembered for his famous and controversial baserunning blunder as a 19-year rookie in 1908 that likely cost the Giants the National League pennant.
- March 4 – Frank Kelliher, 56, pinch-hitter who appeared in just one game with the Washington Senators in 1919.
- March 5 – Bruce Ogrodowski, 44, backup catcher for the St. Louis Cardinals in part of two seasons from 1936 to 1937.
- March 6 – Joe Berger, 69, part-time infielder for the Chicago White Sox in the 1913 and 1914 seasons.
- March 7 – Shorty Desjardien, 62, pitcher for the Cleveland Indians in 1916, who is regarded as one of the best all-around athletes ever produced by the University of Chicago, while playing on Western Conference championship teams in both football and baseball, and competing also in basketball and track and field tournaments.
- March 10 – Solly Hofman, 73, an above-average center fielder and one of the Deadball Era's finest utility men, who spent 14 seasons with five Major League teams between 1903 and 1916, while garnering attention as a timely hitter, his speed on the bases, and spectacular catches in outfield.
- March 14 – Lena Styles, 56, catcher who played with the Philadelphia Athletics and Cincinnati Reds over parts of five seasons from 1919 to 1931.
- March 20 – Ed Smith, 77, pitcher for the St. Louis Browns during the 1906 season.
- March 25 – Steel Arm Johnny Taylor, 76, standout pitcher in Black baseball during the first two decades of the 20th century, before the organization of the Negro leagues; one of four baseball-playing brothers.

=== April ===
- April 3
  - Dolly Gray, 77, pitcher who played from 1909 to 1911 for the Washington Senators.
  - Clay Roe, 52, pitcher for the 1923 Washington Senators.
- April 5 – Tommy Taylor, 63, third baseman who played his only Major League season with the 1924 World Series champion Washington Senators.
- April 9 – John Quinn, 70, backup catcher for the 1911 Philadelphia Phillies.
- April 10
  - Ginger Beaumont, 79, outfielder for Pittsburgh, Boston and Chicago of the National League (1899–1910) who hit .311 in 1,463 games; 1902 NL batting champion (.357) who led Senior Circuit in hits four times (1902–1904, 1907).
  - Bill Brady, 66, relief pitcher for the 1912 Boston Braves.
- April 16 – George Puccinelli, 48, outfielder who played for the St. Louis Cardinals, St. Louis Browns and Philadelphia Athletics over parts of four seasons spanning 1930–1936.
- April 18
  - Claude Davidson, 59, second baseman in 33 total games for 1918 Philadelphia Athletics and 1919 Washington Senators; president of New England League (1926–1930, 1946–1949).
  - John Heydler, 86, ninth full-time president of the National League (1916–1934); former umpire and sportswriter.
  - Patsy O'Rourke, 75, shortstop for the 1908 St. Louis Cardinals.
- April 20 – Sam Brenegan, 65, backup batcher for the 1914 Pittsburgh Pirates.
- April 26 – Cliff Blankenship, 76, catcher and first baseman who played with the Cincinnati Reds in 1905 and for the Washington Senators in 1907 and 1909.

=== May ===
- May 3
  - Karl Kolseth, 63, first baseman who played in 1915 for the Baltimore Terrapins of the Federal League.
  - J. C. Segraves, 44, centerfielder for the 1937 Indianapolis Athletics of the Negro American League.
- May 4 – Gus Dorner, 79, pitcher for the Boston Beaneaters, Cincinnati Reds and Cleveland Naps in a span of six seasons between 1902 and 1909.
- May 5 – John Godwin, 79, infield/outfield utility man for the Boston Americans in the 1905 and 1906 seasons.
- May 6 – Harry Ostdiek, 75, backup catcher who played with the Cleveland Naps in the 1904 season and for the Boston Red Sox in 1908.
- May 7 – Tommy Atkins, 68, pitcher who played from 1909 to 1910 for the Philadelphia Athletics.
- May 10 – Jimmy Slagle, 82, outfielder who played for four National League clubs in 10 seasons from 1899 to 1908, winning two World Series rings with the Chicago Cubs in 1907 and 1908.
- May 20 – Rayford Finch, 31, southpaw who hurled for the 1945 Cleveland Buckeyes of the Negro American League.
- May 22 – Harry Howell, 79, notorious spitballer who pitched with six teams from 1898 to 1910, helping the Brooklyn Superbas win the 1900 National League pennant and becoming the best pitcher of the St. Louis Browns (now Baltimore Orioles) during the Deadball Era, establishing a franchise record for career ERA (2.06) that has never been equaled.
- May 26 – Al Simmons, 54, slugging Hall of Fame left fielder for seven clubs from 1924 to 1944, most prominently for Connie Mack and his fearsome Philadelphia Athletics of the late 1920s and early 1930s, who topped the American League with a .387 batting average, 24 home runs and 129 runs batted in and 253 hits in 1925, expanding his production in the next three seasons with averages of .341, a league-best .392, and .351, driving in 109, 108 and 107 runs, respectively, while guiding the Athletics to the American League pennant from 1929 through 1931, and World Series titles the first two of those years, ending his career with a .334 batting average, 2,927 hits, 307 home runs and 1,827 RBI, all with an unconventional batting stance that earned him the nickname 'Bucketfoot Al' because his stride took him toward third base.
- May 27 – Freddy Sale, 54, pitcher who appeared in just one game with the Pittsburgh Pirates in 1924.

=== June ===
- June 2
  - Tony Parisse, 44, catcher for wartime Philadelphia Athletics (1943–1944) who played in ten career MLB games.
  - Denny Sullivan, 73, center fielder for the Washington Senators, Boston Americans/Red Sox and Cleveland Naps between 1905 and 1909.
- June 3 – Roxy Walters, 63, catcher who played in 498 games over 11 seasons (1915–1925) for the New York Yankees, Boston Red Sox and Cleveland Indians.
- June 15 – Scotty Ingerton, 70, infielder/outfielder who appeared in 136 games in 1911 for Boston of the National League.
- June 19 – John Monroe, 58, second baseman who got into 60 games for the New York Giants and Philadelphia Phillies in 1921.
- June 22 – Ed Forsyth, 69, third baseman for appeared in one game for the 1915 Baltimore Terrapins of the Federal League.
- June 28 – Grover Baichley, 66, right-hander who worked in four games for the 1914 St. Louis Browns.

=== July ===
- July 2 – Roy Wilkinson, 63, pitcher for the 1918 Cleveland Indians and 1919–1922 Chicago White Sox; appeared in two games of the infamous 1919 World Series as a reliever; after the Black Sox Scandal decimated his team, went 4–20 (5.13 ERA) for 1921 ChiSox.
- July 9 – Budd Ryan, 70, catcher in 166 total games for 1912–1913 Cleveland Naps; longtime Pacific Coast League player and manager.
- July 10 – Joe Giard, 56, left-handed pitcher who worked in 68 games for 1925–1926 St. Louis Browns and 1927 New York Yankees.
- July 13 – Glenn Liebhardt, 73, pitcher who posted a 36–35 record with a sparkling 2.17 ERA in 90 games for the 1906–1909 Cleveland Naps; his son and namesake pitched in the majors in the 1930s.
- July 18 – Hank Perry, 69, centerfielder/pinch hitter who got into 13 games for the 1912 Detroit Tigers.
- July 25 – John Kane, 56, infielder who played in 14 games in September 1925 for the Chicago White Sox.
- July 26 – Dad Clark, 83, first baseman who played a dozen games for the 1902 Chicago Orphans (now the Cubs).
- July 30 – Tommy Sewell, 50, scion of famous Alabama baseball family, who had one MLB at bat as a pinch hitter for the 1927 Cubs; brother of Hall of Famer Joe and All-Star catcher and manager Luke Sewell, and cousin of hurler Rip Sewell.

=== August ===
- August 5 – Paddy Siglin, 64, second baseman and pinch hitter who appeared 23 games over three seasons (1914–1916) for the Pittsburgh Pirates.
- August 7 – Hughie Tate, 76, who appeared in four games for the 1904 Washington Senators as a leftfielder and pinch hitter.
- August 12 – Warren Miller, 71, outfielder who got into 47 career games over two stints (1909, 1911) with the Washington Senators.
- August 14
  - Frank Dupee, 79, Vermont native and Chicago White Stockings hurler who, in his lone game pitched on August 24, 1901, walked the only three MLB batters he ever faced; all scored, saddling Dupee with a career earned run average of infinity.
  - Wilfredo Salas, 33, Cuban pitcher in independent, Negro league, and minor league baseball between 1946 and the year of his death, spent with the Rojos del Aguila de Veracruz of the Mexican League.
- August 24 – Art Fromme, 72, pitcher for the St. Louis Cardinals, Cincinnati Reds and New York Giants between 1906 and 1915.
- August 31 – Frank Watt, 53, pitcher who went 5–5 (4.84) with three saves in 38 games for the 1931 Philadelphia Phillies.

=== September ===
- September 4 – Pat Ragan, 72, pitcher who appeared for seven big-league teams (primarily Brooklyn and Boston of the National League) in 11 seasons spanning 1909 to 1923; went 77–104 with a 2.99 career ERA in 283 career gams pitched.
- September 6 – Stubby Magner, 68, Cornell graduate and 5 ft 3 in (1.60 m), 135 lb (61 kg) shortstop who appeared in 13 games for 1911 New York Highlanders.
- September 10 – Eddie Brown, 65, outfielder who batted .303 in 790 MLB games with New York Giants (1920–1921), Brooklyn Robins (1924–1925) and Boston Braves (1926–1928); led National League in hits, with 201, in 1926.
- September 11 – Marty Herrmann, 63, southpaw who hurled one inning for the Brooklyn Robins in his lone MLB appearance on July 10, 1918.
- September 12 – Tod Sloan, 65, outfielder/pinch hitter who played in 143 games over three seasons (1913, 1917, 1919) with the St. Louis Browns.
- September 18 – Jim Rutherford, 69, outfielder and Cornell alumnus who appeared in one game (and four innings) in centerfield for the Cleveland Naps on July 12, 1910, going one-for-two (.500).
- September 20 – Tom Gastall, 24, "bonus baby" catcher for 1955–1956 Baltimore Orioles; one day after playing in his 52nd career game, he was killed when the single-engine aircraft he was piloting crashed into Chesapeake Bay.
- September 22 – Jesse Tannehill, 82, turn-of-20th-century mound star for the Pittsburgh Pirates, Boston Americans/Red Sox and New York Highlanders (1894, 1897–1909, 1911) who won 20 games six times and 197 games overall; led NL pitchers in ERA (2.18) in 1901.
- September 24 – Walt Marbet, 66, pitcher who twirled in three games for the 1913 St. Louis Cardinals.
- September 25 – John McMakin, 78, southpaw who made four appearances, all starts, for the 1902 Brooklyn Superbas, throwing four complete games and going 2–2, with a 3.09 ERA in 32 innings pitched.

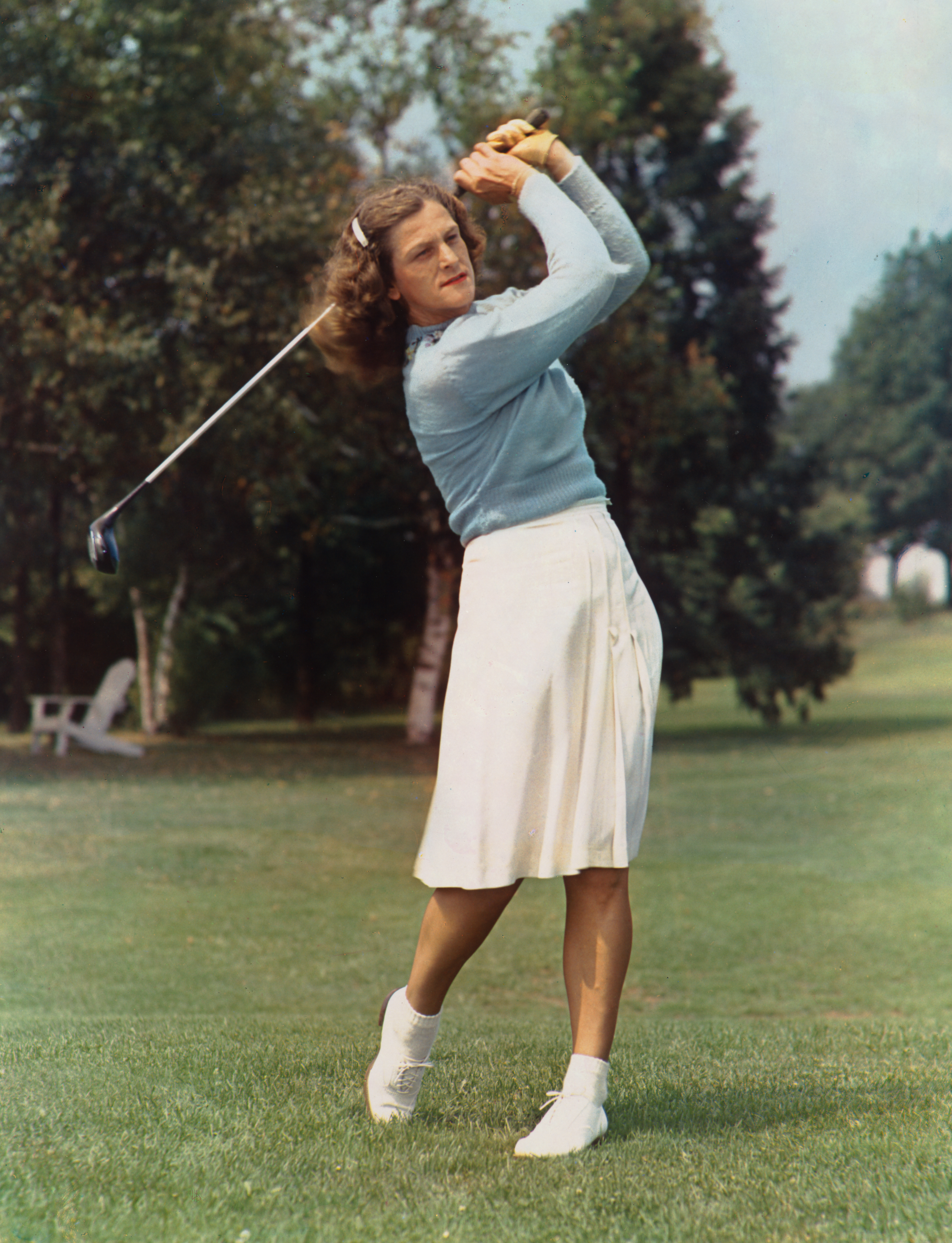
Mildred "Babe" Didrikson Zaharias

- September 27 – Babe Didrikson Zaharias, 45, multi-sport American female athlete—she was a Gold medalist in track during the 1932 Olympics, an All-American in basketball, and a winner of ten LPGA golfing championships—who also made her mark in baseball; she pitched four innings in spring training against MLB hitters (1934), toured with the "House of David" barnstorming team, and is still recognized as the record-holder of the longest-ever baseball throw by a woman.

=== October ===
- October 4 – Jake Gettman, 80, outfielder and first Russian-born MLB player who appeared in 197 games from 1897 to 1899 for the National League's Washington Senators; his professional baseball career lasted for 18 seasons.
- October 7 – Tom Stouch, 86, second baseman who played in four games for the 1898 Louisville Colonels (NL).
- October 13 – George Dumont, 60, pitcher who compiled a 10–23 (2.85) record in 77 games for the Washington Senators and Boston Red Sox between 1915 and 1919.
- October 22
  - Frank Scheibeck, 91, shortstop who played in three major leagues (NL, AL and 19th-century American Association) for seven franchises in eight seasons interspersed between 1887 and 1906, appearing in 390 career games overall.
  - John Jackson, 47, pitcher signed off the University of Pennsylvania campus who appeared in ten contests for the 1933 Philadelphia Phillies.
- October 26 – Red Nelson, 70, pitcher who worked in 39 career games for the St. Louis Browns, Philadelphia Phillies and Cincinnati Reds between 1910 and 1913.
- October 30 – Dick Midkiff, 42, pitcher for the 1938 Boston Red Sox.
- October 31 – John Leighton, 95, centerfielder who played in seven games for Syracuse (American Association) in 1890.

=== November ===
- November 1 – Limb McKenry, 68, pitcher who compiled a 6–6 (3.10) record in 27 games for the Cincinnati Reds in 1915 and 1916.
- November 3 – John Jones, 55, outfielder and Penn State graduate who played five total games for the Philadelphia Athletics—one contest in 1923, then, after nine years in the minors, four in 1932.
- November 9 – Lem Hunter, 93, who appeared in one game for the Cleveland Blues(NL) in 1883. starting in the outfield, then shifting to the pitchers' mound after two innings.
- November 14 – Ed Hilley, 77, third baseman who played one game for the Philadelphia Athletics on September 29, 1903.
- November 20 – Bub Kuhn, 57, who pitched a single inning for the 1924 Cleveland Indians, taking the loss in relief September 1 against the St. Louis Browns.
- November 22 – Roy Carlyle, 55, outfielder who hit .312 in 174 games the Washington Senators, Boston Red Sox and New York Yankees in 1925–1926.
- November 27 – Charlie Peete, 27, St. Louis Cardinals' rookie centerfielder, who appeared in 23 games in 1956; killed, along with his wife and three children, in a plane crash in Venezuela while reporting to his winter baseball team.
- November 30 – John Shea, 51, southpaw who hurled in one game for the Boston Red Sox on June 30, 1928.

=== December ===
- December 6 – Jim Mullen, 79, second- and first baseman for the Philadelphia Athletics and Washington Senators who played 118 MLB games in 1904 and 1905.
- December 10 – Grace Reidy Comiskey, 63, owner of the Chicago White Sox from July 18, 1939 until her death.
- December 12 – Bill Malarkey, 78, pitcher who appeared in 15 games for the 1908 New York Giants.
- December 16 – Ziggy Sears, 64, National League umpire from 1934 through 1945; worked 1935 and 1944 World Series, 1938 and 1944 All-Star Games, and 1,649 NL contests.
- December 17 – Ona Dodd, 70, second baseman who went hitless in nine at bats in five games for the 1912 Pittsburgh Pirates.
- December 24 – Del Howard, 79, outfielder/first baseman who appeared in 536 games for the Pirates, Boston Beaneaters/Doves and Chicago Cubs from 1905 to 1909; member of the 1907–1908 World Series champion Cubs.
- December 26 – John Tapley, 45, third baseman for the 1933 Akron Grays of the Negro National League.
- December 27 – Hob Hiller, 63, infielder who played 18 total games for the Boston Red Sox in 1920 and 1921.
