= 1958 Pittsburgh Pirates season =

1958 Pittsburgh Pirates
- League: National League
- Ballpark: Forbes Field
- City: Pittsburgh, Pennsylvania
- Owners: John W. Galbreath (majority shareholder); Bing Crosby, Thomas P. Johnson, Branch Rickey (minority shareholders)
- General managers: Joe L. Brown
- Managers: Danny Murtaugh
- Television: KDKA-TV; Bob Prince, Jim Woods
- Radio: KDKA; Bob Prince, Paul Long, Jim Woods

The 1958 Pittsburgh Pirates season was the 77th season of the Pittsburgh Pirates franchise; the 72nd in the National League. The Pirates finished second in the league standings with a record of 84–70, a 22-game improvement over 1957. They ended the year in the first division for the first time since 1948 and recorded their highest league standing since the 1944 edition also finished in second place. Manager Danny Murtaugh, in his first full season at the Pirates' helm, was voted Major League Manager of the Year by The Sporting News.

== Offseason ==
- December 2, 1957: Ellis Burton was drafted from the Pirates by the St. Louis Cardinals in the 1957 minor league draft.
- December 28, 1957: Dee Fondy was traded by the Pirates to the Cincinnati Redlegs for Ted Kluszewski.

== Regular season ==
=== Season standings ===
National League
| Team | W | L | Pct. | GB | Home | Road |
|---|---|---|---|---|---|---|
| Milwaukee Braves | 92 | 62 | .597 | — | 48‍–‍29 | 44‍–‍33 |
| Pittsburgh Pirates | 84 | 70 | .545 | 8 | 49‍–‍28 | 35‍–‍42 |
| San Francisco Giants | 80 | 74 | .519 | 12 | 44‍–‍33 | 36‍–‍41 |
| Cincinnati Redlegs | 76 | 78 | .494 | 16 | 40‍–‍37 | 36‍–‍41 |
| Chicago Cubs | 72 | 82 | .468 | 20 | 35‍–‍42 | 37‍–‍40 |
| St. Louis Cardinals | 72 | 82 | .468 | 20 | 39‍–‍38 | 33‍–‍44 |
| Los Angeles Dodgers | 71 | 83 | .461 | 21 | 39‍–‍38 | 32‍–‍45 |
| Philadelphia Phillies | 69 | 85 | .448 | 23 | 35‍–‍42 | 34‍–‍43 |

=== Record vs. opponents ===
1958 National League record Sources:
| Team | CHC | CIN | LAD | MIL | PHI | PIT | SF | STL |
|---|---|---|---|---|---|---|---|---|
| Chicago | — | 10–12 | 11–11 | 10–12 | 13–9 | 9–13 | 12–10 | 7–15 |
| Cincinnati | 12–10 | — | 11–11 | 5–17 | 15–7 | 10–12 | 11–11 | 12–10 |
| Los Angeles | 11–11 | 11–11 | — | 14–8 | 10–12 | 8–14 | 6–16 | 11–11 |
| Milwaukee | 12–10 | 17–5 | 8–14 | — | 13–9 | 11–11 | 16–6 | 15–7 |
| Philadelphia | 9–13 | 7–15 | 12–10 | 9–13 | — | 12–10 | 8–14 | 12–10 |
| Pittsburgh | 13–9 | 12–10 | 14–8 | 11–11 | 10–12 | — | 12–10 | 12–10 |
| San Francisco | 10–12 | 11–11 | 16–6 | 6–16 | 14–8 | 10–12 | — | 13–9 |
| St. Louis | 15–7 | 10–12 | 11–11 | 7–15 | 10–12 | 10–12 | 9–13 | — |

=== Game log ===
1958 Game Log: 84–70 (Home: 49–28; Away: 35–42)
April: 7–5 (Home: 1–3; Away: 6–2)

| # | Date | Opponent | Score | Win | Loss | Save | Attendance | Record |
|---|---|---|---|---|---|---|---|---|
| 1 | April 15 | @ Braves | 4–3 (14) | **Blackburn** (1–0) | Conley | **Raydon** (1) | 43,339 | 1–0 |
| 2 | April 17 | @ Braves | 1–6 | Burdette | **Law** (0–1) | — | 12,854 | 1–1 |
| 3 | April 18 | Redlegs | 1–4 | Purkey | **Kline** (0–1) | Jeffcoat | 34,032 | 1–2 |
| 4 | April 19 | Redlegs | 6–9 | Haddix | **Smith** (0–1) | Jeffcoat | 12,171 | 1–3 |
| 5 | April 20 | Redlegs | 4–3 | **Friend** (1–0) | Schmidt | — | 15,142 | 2–3 |
| 6 | April 22 | Braves | 2–5 | Buhl | **Kline** (0–2) | — | 6,991 | 2–4 |
| 7 | April 23 | @ Phillies | 1–8 | Sanford | **Blackburn** (1–1) | — | 7,668 | 2–5 |
| 8 | April 24 | @ Phillies | 7–4 | **Friend** (2–0) | Simmons | **Face** (1) | 7,456 | 3–5 |
| 9 | April 25 | @ Redlegs | 4–3 | **Law** (1–1) | Haddix | **Face** (2) | 7,744 | 4–5 |
| 10 | April 26 | @ Redlegs | 8–4 | **Gross** (1–0) | Rabe | — | 3,291 | 5–5 |
| 11 | April 29 | @ Dodgers | 7–1 | **Friend** (3–0) | Erskine | — | 19,778 | 6–5 |
| 12 | April 30 | @ Dodgers | 3–1 | **Kline** (1–2) | Drysdale | — | 13,890 | 7–5 |

May: 15–15 (Home: 11–7; Away: 4–8)

| # | Date | Opponent | Score | Win | Loss | Save | Attendance | Record |
|---|---|---|---|---|---|---|---|---|
| 13 | May 1 | @ Dodgers | 8–3 | **Law** (2–1) | Newcombe | **Blackburn** (1) | 16,503 | 8–5 |
| 14 | May 2 | @ Dodgers | 5–9 | Podres | **Perez** (0–1) | Labine | 22,940 | 8–6 |
| 15 | May 3 | @ Dodgers | 3–1 | **Friend** (4–0) | Kipp | **Face** (3) | 16,288 | 9–6 |
| 16 | May 4 | @ Giants | 6–2 | **Kline** (2–2) | Antonelli | **Face** (4) | | 10–6 |
| 17 | May 4 | @ Giants | 3–4 (10) | Worthington | **Face** (0–1) | — | 22,721 | 10–7 |
| 18 | May 5 | @ Giants | 11–10 | **Law** (3–1) | Gomez | **Gross** (1) | 5,506 | 11–7 |
| 19 | May 6 | @ Giants | 0–7 | McCormick | **Daniels** (0–1) | — | 10,849 | 11–8 |
| 20 | May 7 | @ Giants | 6–8 | Worthington | **Friend** (4–1) | Grissom | 8,052 | 11–9 |
| 21 | May 9 | Phillies | 1–0 (12) | **Kline** (3–2) | Roberts | — | 21,304 | 12–9 |
| 22 | May 10 | Phillies | 14–4 | **Law** (4–1) | Semproch | — | 11,807 | 13–9 |
| 23 | May 11 | Phillies | 10–4 | **Friend** (5–1) | Sanford | — | | 14–9 |
| 24 | May 11 | Phillies | 1–0 (11) | **Porterfield** (1–0) | Simmons | — | 20,544 | 15–9 |
| 25 | May 13 | Redlegs | 6–3 | **Kline** (4–2) | Lawrence | **Gross** (2) | 24,123 | 16–9 |
| 26 | May 14 | Redlegs | 5–4 | **Law** (5–1) | Rabe | — | 24,102 | 17–9 |
| 27 | May 15 | Redlegs | 4–9 | Klippstein | **Friend** (5–2) | Jeffcoat | 12,022 | 17–10 |
| 28 | May 16 | @ Phillies | 2–6 | Simmons | **Porterfield** (1–1) | — | 12,401 | 17–11 |
| 29 | May 17 | @ Phillies | 3–4 | Roberts | **Daniels** (0–2) | — | 6,262 | 17–12 |
| 30 | May 18 | @ Phillies | 4–6 | Sanford | **Kline** (4–3) | Farrell | | 17–13 |
| 31 | May 18 | @ Phillies | 2–6 | Semproch | **Law** (5–2) | — | 19,068 | 17–14 |
| 32 | May 20 | Cubs | 12–3 | **Friend** (6–2) | Drott | — | 15,848 | 18–14 |
| 33 | May 21 | Cubs | 1–5 | Phillips | **Porterfield** (1–2) | — | 5,393 | 18–15 |
| 34 | May 23 | Cardinals | 3–2 | **Kline** (5–3) | Mizell | **Gross** (3) | 29,369 | 19–15 |
| 35 | May 24 | Cardinals | 6–1 | **Friend** (7–2) | Jackson | — | 13,330 | 20–15 |
| 36 | May 25 | Giants | 2–5 | Gomez | **Law** (5–3) | — | | 20–16 |
| 37 | May 25 | Giants | 1–6 | Monzant | **Raydon** (0–1) | — | 35,797 | 20–17 |
| 38 | May 27 | Dodgers | 5–3 | **Kline** (6–3) | Drysdale | **Blackburn** (2) | 15,705 | 21–17 |
| 39 | May 28 | Dodgers | 1–7 | Koufax | **Friend** (7–3) | — | 14,320 | 21–18 |
| 40 | May 30 | Braves | 4–7 | McMahon | **Face** (0–2) | Trowbridge | | 21–19 |
| 41 | May 30 | Braves | 12–6 | **Gross** (2–0) | Robinson | — | 32,428 | 22–19 |
| 42 | May 31 | Braves | 3–8 | Spahn | **Kline** (6–4) | — | 17,596 | 22–20 |

June: 12–17 (Home: 7–9; Away: 5–8)

| # | Date | Opponent | Score | Win | Loss | Save | Attendance | Record |
|---|---|---|---|---|---|---|---|---|
| 43 | June 1 | Braves | 5–1 (8) | **Friend** (8–3) | Conley | — | 17,485 | 23–20 |
| 44 | June 2 | @ Redlegs | 2–8 | Nuxhall | **Smith** (0–2) | — | 2,827 | 23–21 |
| 45 | June 3 | @ Cardinals | 4–8 | Jackson | **Raydon** (0–2) | — | 11,465 | 23–22 |
| 46 | June 4 | @ Cardinals | 3–6 | Brosnan | **Kline** (6–5) | Muffett | 12,264 | 23–23 |
| 47 | June 5 | @ Cardinals | 3–4 | Mizell | **Friend** (8–4) | — | 7,570 | 23–24 |
| 48 | June 6 | @ Cubs | 1–6 | Drott | **Law** (5–4) | — | 4,567 | 23–25 |
| 49 | June 7 | @ Cubs | 8–6 (10) | **Face** (1–2) | Nichols | **Smith** (1) | 14,487 | 24–25 |
| 50 | June 8 | @ Cubs | 0–4 | Drabowsky | **Kline** (6–6) | — | 15,670 | 24–26 |
| 51 | June 10 | @ Giants | 5–4 | **Friend** (9–4) | Monzant | — | 16,621 | 25–26 |
| 52 | June 11 | @ Giants | 14–6 | **Law** (6–4) | Gomez | **Face** (5) | 7,912 | 26–26 |
| 53 | June 12 | @ Giants | 2–1 | **Raydon** (1–2) | Giel | — | 9,273 | 27–26 |
| 54 | June 13 | @ Dodgers | 4–5 | Labine | **Kline** (6–7) | — | 27,748 | 27–27 |
| 55 | June 14 | @ Dodgers | 2–4 | Podres | **Friend** (9–5) | — | 35,345 | 27–28 |
| 56 | June 15 | @ Dodgers | 12–1 | **Law** (7–4) | Newcombe | — | 30,752 | 28–28 |
| 57 | June 17 | Giants | 6–1 | **Raydon** (2–2) | Antonelli | **Face** (6) | 27,763 | 29–28 |
| 58 | June 18 | Giants | 1–2 (10) | Giel | **Friend** (9–6) | Grissom | 21,512 | 29–29 |
| 59 | June 19 | Giants | 6–5 | **Kline** (7–7) | Worthington | **Gross** (4) | 8,474 | 30–29 |
| 60 | June 20 | Dodgers | 2–1 | **Witt** (1–0) | Koufax | — | 21,614 | 31–29 |
| 61 | June 21 | Dodgers | 11–7 | **Face** (2–2) | Roebuck | — | 6,633 | 32–29 |
| 62 | June 22 | Dodgers | 1–4 | Kipp | **Friend** (9–7) | Klippstein | | 32–30 |
| 63 | June 22 | Dodgers | 2–3 (10) | Koufax | **Porterfield** (1–3) | — | 30,109 | 32–31 |
| 64 | June 23 | Cardinals | 5–7 | Brosnan | **Gross** (2–1) | Jackson | 13,529 | 32–32 |
| 65 | June 24 | Cardinals | 1–2 | Paine | **Kline** (7–8) | — | 15,899 | 32–33 |
| 66 | June 25 | Cardinals | 1–3 | Mizell | **Witt** (1–1) | — | 15,375 | 32–34 |
| 67 | June 26 | Cardinals | 2–6 | McDaniel | **Law** (7–5) | Jackson | 5,048 | 32–35 |
| 68 | June 27 | Cubs | 1–3 | Drabowsky | **Friend** (9–8) | Henry | 17,026 | 32–36 |
| 69 | June 28 | Cubs | 7–3 | **Raydon** (3–2) | Drott | **Porterfield** (1) | 8,413 | 33–36 |
| 70 | June 29 | Cubs | 4–3 | **Face** (3–2) | Phillips | — | | 34–36 |
| 71 | June 29 | Cubs | 3–8 | Briggs | **Gross** (2–2) | Henry | 28,968 | 34–37 |

July: 15–12 (Home: 8–3; Away: 7–9)

| # | Date | Opponent | Score | Win | Loss | Save | Attendance | Record |
|---|---|---|---|---|---|---|---|---|
| 72 | July 1 | Phillies | 2–4 | Semproch | **Friend** (9–9) | — | 17,990 | 34–38 |
| 73 | July 3 | @ Redlegs | 2–0 | **Witt** (2–1) | Nuxhall | **Face** (7) | 11,707 | 35–38 |
| 74 | July 4 | @ Redlegs | 3–4 | Kellner | **Kline** (7–9) | — | | 35–39 |
| 75 | July 4 | @ Redlegs | 3–8 | Purkey | **Law** (7–6) | — | 15,999 | 35–40 |
| 76 | July 5 | @ Braves | 4–2 | **Friend** (10–9) | Burdette | **Face** (8) | 23,833 | 36–40 |
| 77 | July 6 | @ Braves | 0–2 | Jay | **Raydon** (3–3) | — | 26,288 | 36–41 |
| 78 | July 10 | @ Cubs | 7–8 | Phillips | **Law** (7–7) | Henry | 35,000 | 36–42 |
| 79 | July 11 | @ Cubs | 7–2 | **Kline** (8–9) | Drabowsky | — | 8,070 | 37–42 |
| 80 | July 12 | @ Cardinals | 0–2 | Mizell | **Friend** (10–10) | — | 12,956 | 37–43 |
| 81 | July 13 | @ Cardinals | 10–8 | **Blackburn** (2–1) | Jackson | **Law** (1) | 27,844 | 38–43 |
| 82 | July 13 | @ Cardinals | 8–6 | **Law** (8–7) | Stobbs | — | 27,844 | 39–43 |
| 83 | July 15 | @ Dodgers | 6–2 | **Kline** (9–9) | Drysdale | **Gross** (5) | 20,827 | 40–43 |
| 84 | July 16 | @ Dodgers | 7–4 | **Friend** (11–10) | Kipp | **Face** (9) | 19,706 | 41–43 |
| 85 | July 17 | @ Dodgers | 3–5 | Williams | **Witt** (2–2) | Labine | 18,677 | 41–44 |
| 86 | July 18 | @ Giants | 4–5 | Miller | **Law** (8–8) | Grissom | 22,770 | 41–45 |
| 87 | July 19 | @ Giants | 4–5 | Monzant | **Porterfield** (1–4) | Antonelli | 19,685 | 41–46 |
| 88 | July 20 | @ Giants | 3–7 | Giel | **Friend** (11–11) | Gomez | 22,814 | 41–47 |
| 89 | July 23 | Dodgers | 11–3 | **Kline** (10–9) | Williams | — | | 42–47 |
| 90 | July 23 | Dodgers | 6–3 | **Friend** (12–11) | Labine | **Face** (10) | 18,938 | 43–47 |
| 91 | July 24 | Dodgers | 5–3 | **Witt** (3–2) | Williams | **Face** (11) | 7,437 | 44–47 |
| 92 | July 25 | Giants | 10–0 | **Raydon** (4–3) | Miller | — | 30,545 | 45–47 |
| 93 | July 26 | Giants | 0–1 | Antonelli | **Law** (8–9) | Grissom | 15,549 | 45–48 |
| 94 | July 27 | Giants | 2–1 (14) | **Gross** (3–2) | Monzant | — | | 46–48 |
| 95 | July 27 | Giants | 4–3 | **Porterfield** (2–4) | Giel | — | 31,718 | 47–48 |
| 96 | July 29 | Cubs | 6–4 | **Friend** (13–11) | Briggs | **Face** (12) | 20,325 | 48–48 |
| 97 | July 30 | Cubs | 7–1 (8) | **Witt** (4–2) | Phillips | **Porterfield** (2) | 20,869 | 49–48 |
| 98 | July 31 | Cubs | 4–5 (8) | Hobbie | **Gross** (3–3) | Henry | 13,060 | 49–49 |

August: 21–12 (Home: 10–0; Away: 11–12)

| # | Date | Opponent | Score | Win | Loss | Save | Attendance | Record |
|---|---|---|---|---|---|---|---|---|
| 99 | August 1 | Cardinals | 2–0 | **Kline** (11–9) | Mabe | — | 27,862 | 50–49 |
| 100 | August 2 | Cardinals | 1–0 | **Law** (9–9) | Jones | — | 15,028 | 51–49 |
| 101 | August 3 | Cardinals | 2–0 | **Friend** (14–11) | Maglie | — | | 52–49 |
| 102 | August 3 | Cardinals | 2–1 | **Witt** (5–2) | Mizell | — | | 53–49 |
| 103 | August 4 | @ Braves | 4–3 | **Raydon** (5–3) | Pizarro | **Face** (13) | 24,096 | 54–49 |
| 104 | August 5 | @ Braves | 1–6 | Burdette | **Kline** (11–10) | — | 25,545 | 54–50 |
| 105 | August 6 | @ Braves | 1–2 | Willey | **Law** (9–10) | — | 28,760 | 54–51 |
| 106 | August 7 | @ Braves | 2–3 | Spahn | **Friend** (14–12) | — | 24,525 | 54–52 |
| 107 | August 8 | Redlegs | 1–0 | **Witt** (6–2) | Nuxhall | — | 26,040 | 55–52 |
| 108 | August 9 | Redlegs | 5–2 | **Raydon** (6–3) | Kellner | **Face** (14) | 13,122 | 56–52 |
| 109 | August 10 | Redlegs | 3–2 (10) | **Gross** (4–3) | Jeffcoat | — | | 57–52 |
| 110 | August 10 | Redlegs | 4–3 | **Face** (4–2) | Lawrence | — | 26,426 | 58–52 |
| 111 | August 11 | Braves | 6–4 | **Friend** (15–12) | Spahn | **Face** (15) | 38,938 | 59–52 |
| 112 | August 12 | Braves | 10–0 | **Witt** (7–2) | Rush | — | 36,867 | 60–52 |
| 113 | August 13 | @ Phillies | 10–9 | **Smith** (1–2) | Meyer | **Law** (2) | 19,132 | 61–52 |
| 114 | August 15 | @ Redlegs | 1–6 | Purkey | **Kline** (11–11) | — | 11,277 | 61–53 |
| 115 | August 16 | @ Redlegs | 13–4 | **Friend** (16–12) | Lawrence | **Porterfield** (3) | 9,564 | 62–53 |
| 116 | August 17 | @ Redlegs | 3–4 | Acker | **Porterfield** (2–5) | — | | 62–54 |
| 117 | August 17 | @ Redlegs | 5–7 | Nuxhall | **Gross** (4–4) | Newcombe | 17,416 | 62–55 |
| 118 | August 19 | @ Cubs | 4–3 | **Raydon** (7–3) | Phillips | **Porterfield** (4) | 12,929 | 63–55 |
| 119 | August 20 | @ Cubs | 4–2 | **Kline** (12–11) | Hillman | **Face** (16) | | 64–55 |
| 120 | August 20 | @ Cubs | 1–5 (5) | Drott | **Friend** (16–13) | — | 20,974 | 64–56 |
| 121 | August 21 | @ Cubs | 3–5 | Drabowsky | **Law** (9–11) | Hobbie | 10,027 | 64–57 |
| 122 | August 22 | @ Cubs | 8–2 | **Witt** (8–2) | Solis | **Law** (3) | 8,507 | 65–57 |
| 123 | August 23 | @ Cubs | 6–1 | **Porterfield** (3–5) | Phillips | — | 16,097 | 66–57 |
| 124 | August 24 | @ Cardinals | 8–4 | **Friend** (17–13) | Mizell | **Face** (17) | | 67–57 |
| 125 | August 24 | @ Cardinals | 8–12 | Brosnan | **Gross** (4–5) | Wight | 25,630 | 67–58 |
| 126 | August 25 | @ Cardinals | 1–7 | Jackson | **Kline** (12–12) | — | 9,464 | 67–59 |
| 127 | August 26 | @ Cardinals | 5–3 | **Gross** (5–5) | Jones | **Face** (18) | 13,271 | 68–59 |
| 128 | August 27 | @ Cardinals | 14–1 | **Law** (10–11) | Chittum | — | 10,467 | 69–59 |
| 129 | August 29 | @ Braves | 3–2 | **Friend** (18–13) | Spahn | **Gross** (6) | 35,642 | 70–59 |
| 130 | August 30 | @ Braves | 1–9 | Burdette | **Raydon** (7–4) | — | 28,648 | 70–60 |
| 131 | August 31 | @ Braves | 0–2 | Willey | **Kline** (12–13) | — | 32,870 | 70–61 |

September: 14–9 (Home: 12–6; Away: 2–3)

| # | Date | Opponent | Score | Win | Loss | Save | Attendance | Record |
|---|---|---|---|---|---|---|---|---|
| 132 | September 1 | Phillies | 5–2 | **Law** (11–11) | Sanford | — | | 71–61 |
| 133 | September 1 | Phillies | 0–9 | Simmons | **Porterfield** (3–6) | — | 25,438 | 71–62 |
| 134 | September 2 | Phillies | 3–2 | **Friend** (19–13) | Cardwell | — | 9,911 | 72–62 |
| 135 | September 3 | @ Redlegs | 4–7 | Schmidt | **Gross** (5–6) | Pena | 7,917 | 72–63 |
| 136 | September 5 | Braves | 1–0 (10) | **Witt** (9–2) | Willey | — | 30,319 | 73–63 |
| 137 | September 6 | Braves | 7–6 | **Smith** (2–2) | Robinson | **Face** (19) | 23,392 | 74–63 |
| 138 | September 7 | Braves | 1–3 | Spahn | **Kline** (12–14) | — | | 74–64 |
| 139 | September 7 | Braves | 4–1 | **Law** (12–11) | Burdette | **Face** (20) | 36,567 | 75–64 |
| 140 | September 8 | Redlegs | 4–1 | **Raydon** (8–4) | Acker | **Gross** (7) | 11,577 | 76–64 |
| 141 | September 9 | Giants | 2–1 | **Face** (5–2) | Jones | — | 32,250 | 77–64 |
| 142 | September 10 | Giants | 6–4 (10) | **Friend** (20–13) | Grissom | — | 20,260 | 78–64 |
| 143 | September 12 | Dodgers | 3–7 | Craig | **Kline** (12–15) | — | 21,267 | 78–65 |
| 144 | September 13 | Dodgers | 9–4 | **Law** (13–11) | Mauriello | **Porterfield** (5) | 14,259 | 79–65 |
| 145 | September 14 | Cubs | 5–4 | **Porterfield** (4–6) | Hillman | **Blackburn** (3) | | 80–65 |
| 146 | September 14 | Cubs | 6–2 | **Friend** (21–13) | Phillips | — | 23,160 | 81–65 |
| 147 | September 16 | Cardinals | 3–1 | **Kline** (13–15) | Mabe | — | 25,977 | 82–65 |
| 148 | September 19 | @ Phillies | 4–2 | **Friend** (22–13) | Cardwell | — | 8,498 | 83–65 |
| 149 | September 20 | @ Phillies | 4–3 | **Law** (14–11) | Roberts | **Smith** (2) | 4,217 | 84–65 |
| 150 | September 22 | @ Phillies | 2–3 (14) | Meyer | **Kline** (13–16) | — | | 84–66 |
| 151 | September 22 | @ Phillies | 0–1 | Sanford | **Daniels** (0–3) | — | 5,605 | 84–67 |
| 152 | September 26 | Phillies | 2–3 | Roberts | **Friend** (22–14) | — | 12,000 | 84–68 |
| 153 | September 27 | Phillies | 3–7 | Cardwell | **Law** (14–12) | — | 9,104 | 84–69 |
| 154 | September 28 | Phillies | 4–6 (10) | Meyer | **Gross** (5–7) | — | 33,109 | 84–70 |

Legend: = Win = Loss
Bold = Pirates team member

=== Notable transactions ===
- June 15, 1958: Johnny O'Brien and Gene Freese were traded by the Pirates to the St. Louis Cardinals for Dick Schofield and cash.

=== Roster ===
1958 Pittsburgh Pirates
**Roster**
| **Pitchers**: 48 Ron Blackburn; 30 Bennie Daniels; 26 Roy Face; 19 Bob Friend; 38 Don Gross; 22 Ron Kline; 32 Vern Law; 16 Eddie O'Brien; 47 George Perez; 16 Bob Porterfield; 34 Curt Raydon; 37 Bob Smith; 35 Don Williams; 29,30 George Witt | **Catchers**: 20 Hank Foiles; 11 Bill Hall; 28 Danny Kravitz; 17 Hardy Peterson; **Infielders**: 23 Gene Baker; 8 Harry Bright; 8 Gene Freese; 24 Dick Groat; 3 Ted Kluszewski; 9 Bill Mazeroski; 6 Dick Schofield; 7 R. C. Stevens; 7 Dick Stuart; 15 Frank Thomas | **Outfielders**: 21 Roberto Clemente; 25 Román Mejías; 14 John Powers; 4 Bob Skinner; 18 Bill Virdon; **Other batters**: 6 Johnny O'Brien; 12 Jim Pendleton; 11 Paul Smith | **Manager**: 40 Danny Murtaugh; **Coaches**: 41 Bill Burwell; 42 Lenny Levy; 43 Sam Narron; 44 Frank Oceak |

== Player stats ==
| = Indicates team leader |

=== Batting ===
==== Starters by position ====
Note: Pos = Position; G = Games played; AB = At bats; H = Hits; Avg. = Batting average; HR = Home runs; RBI = Runs batted in

| Pos | Player | G | AB | H | Avg. | HR | RBI |
|---|---|---|---|---|---|---|---|
| C | Hank Foiles | 104 | 264 | 54 | .205 | 8 | 50 |
| 1B | Ted Kluszewski | 100 | 301 | 88 | .292 | 4 | 37 |
| 2B | Bill Mazeroski | 152 | 567 | 156 | .275 | 19 | 68 |
| 3B | Frank Thomas | 149 | 562 | 158 | .281 | 35 | 109 |
| SS | Dick Groat | 151 | 584 | 175 | .300 | 3 | 66 |
| LF | Bob Skinner | 144 | 529 | 170 | .321 | 13 | 70 |
| CF | Bill Virdon | 144 | 604 | 161 | .267 | 9 | 46 |
| RF | Roberto Clemente | 140 | 519 | 150 | .289 | 6 | 50 |

==== Other batters ====
Note: G = Games played; AB = At bats; H = Hits; Avg. = Batting average; HR = Home runs; RBI = Runs batted in

| Player | G | AB | H | Avg. | HR | RBI |
|---|---|---|---|---|---|---|
| Dick Stuart | 67 | 254 | 68 | .268 | 16 | 48 |
| Román Mejías | 76 | 157 | 42 | .268 | 5 | 19 |
| Bill Hall | 51 | 116 | 33 | .284 | 1 | 15 |
| Danny Kravitz | 45 | 100 | 24 | .240 | 1 | 5 |
| R.C. Stevens | 59 | 90 | 24 | .267 | 7 | 18 |
| John Powers | 57 | 82 | 15 | .183 | 2 | 2 |
| Gene Baker | 29 | 56 | 14 | .250 | 0 | 7 |
| Dick Schofield | 26 | 27 | 4 | .148 | 0 | 2 |
| Harry Bright | 15 | 24 | 6 | .250 | 1 | 3 |
| Gene Freese | 17 | 18 | 3 | .167 | 1 | 2 |
| Hardy Peterson | 2 | 6 | 2 | .333 | 0 | 0 |
| Paul Smith | 6 | 3 | 1 | .333 | 0 | 0 |
| Jim Pendleton | 3 | 3 | 1 | .333 | 0 | 0 |
| Johnny O'Brien | 3 | 1 | 0 | .000 | 0 | 0 |

=== Pitching ===
==== Starting pitchers ====
Note: G = Games pitched; IP = Innings pitched; W = Wins; L = Losses; ERA = Earned run average; SO = Strikeouts

| Player | G | IP | W | L | ERA | SO |
|---|---|---|---|---|---|---|
| Bob Friend | 38 | 274.0 | 22 | 14 | 3.68 | 135 |
| Ron Kline | 32 | 237.1 | 13 | 16 | 3.53 | 109 |
| Vern Law | 35 | 202.1 | 14 | 12 | 3.96 | 56 |
| Red Witt | 18 | 106.0 | 9 | 2 | 1.61 | 81 |

==== Other pitchers ====
Note: G = Games pitched; IP = Innings pitched; W = Wins; L = Losses; ERA = Earned run average; SO = Strikeouts

| Player | G | IP | W | L | ERA | SO |
|---|---|---|---|---|---|---|
| Curt Raydon | 31 | 134.1 | 8 | 4 | 3.62 | 85 |
| Bob Porterfield | 37 | 87.2 | 4 | 6 | 3.29 | 39 |
| Bennie Daniels | 8 | 27.2 | 0 | 3 | 5.53 | 7 |

==== Relief pitchers ====
Note: G = Games pitched; W = Wins; L = Losses; SV = Saves; ERA = Earned run average; SO = Strikeouts

| Player | G | W | L | SV | ERA | SO |
|---|---|---|---|---|---|---|
| Roy Face | 57 | 5 | 2 | 20 | 2.89 | 47 |
| Don Gross | 40 | 5 | 7 | 7 | 3.98 | 59 |
| Ron Blackburn | 38 | 2 | 1 | 3 | 3.39 | 31 |
| Bob Smith | 35 | 2 | 2 | 1 | 4.43 | 24 |
| George Perez | 4 | 0 | 1 | 1 | 5.40 | 2 |
| Don Williams | 2 | 0 | 0 | 0 | 6.75 | 3 |
| Eddie O'Brien | 1 | 0 | 0 | 0 | 13.50 | 1 |

== Farm system ==
| Level | Team | League | Manager |
|---|---|---|---|
| AAA | Columbus Jets | International League | Clyde King |
| AAA | Salt Lake City Bees | Pacific Coast League | Larry Shepard |
| A | Lincoln Chiefs | Western League | Monty Basgall |
| B | Tri-City Braves | Northwest League | Ray Hathaway |
| C | Douglas Copper Kings | Arizona–Mexico League | Bob Clear |
| C | San Jose Pirates/Las Vegas Wranglers | California League | Jack Paepke |
| C | Grand Forks Chiefs | Northern League | James Adlam |
| D | Salem Rebels | Appalachian League | Lamar Dorton |
| D | Clinton Pirates | Midwest League | Stan Wentzel and Wally Millies |
| D | San Angelo Pirates | Sophomore League | Al Kubski |

LEAGUE CHAMPIONS: Douglas
San Jose franchised transferred to Las Vegas and renamed, May 26, 1958
