= Bill Hall (catcher) =

American baseball player (1928–1986)

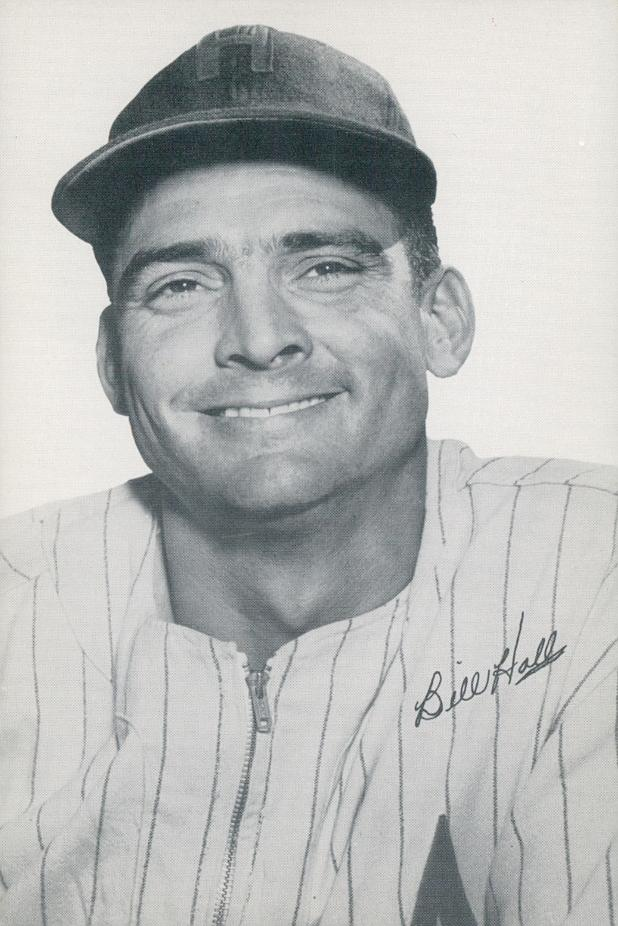
- Hall with the Hollywood Stars c. 1957
- Catcher
- Born: July 30, 1928; Moultrie, Georgia, U.S.
- Died: January 1, 1986 (aged 57); Moultrie, Georgia, U.S.
- Batted: Left Threw: Right

MLB debut
- April 18, 1954, for the Pittsburgh Pirates

Last MLB appearance
- September 26, 1958, for the Pittsburgh Pirates

MLB statistics
- Batting average: .262
- Home runs: 1
- Runs batted in: 15
- Stats at Baseball Reference

Teams
- Pittsburgh Pirates (1954, 1956, 1958)

William Lemuel Hall (July 30, 1928 – January 1, 1986) was an American professional baseball player, a catcher who played parts of three seasons (1954; 1956; 1958) in Major League Baseball with the Pittsburgh Pirates. The native of Moultrie, Georgia, batted left-handed, threw right-handed, stood 5 feet 11 inches (1.80 m) tall and weighed 165 pounds (75 kg).

Hall played his entire, 13-year professional career in the Pittsburgh system, signing with the Pirates before the 1947 season. He played six seasons at the highest levels of minor league baseball with the Open-Classification Hollywood Stars and the Triple-A Salt Lake Bees and Columbus Jets. He appeared in 57 MLB games for the Pirates, 51 of them during the 1958 season, when he batted .284 in 116 at bats. Among his 33 hits were six doubles and one home run.

In between, Hall played winter ball with the Navegantes del Magallanes club of the Venezuelan Professional Baseball League during the 1955-56 season.

Hall retired after the 1960 season, and died in Moultrie at the age of 57 on New Year's Day 1986.
