= George Perez (baseball) =

American baseball player (1937–2022)

- Pitcher
- Born: December 29, 1937; San Fernando, California, U.S.
- Died: March 22, 2022 (aged 84); Bandon, Oregon, U.S.
- Batted: Right Threw: Right

MLB debut
- April 17, 1958, for the Pittsburgh Pirates

Last MLB appearance
- May 6, 1958, for the Pittsburgh Pirates

MLB statistics
- Win–loss record: 0–1
- Earned run average: 5.40
- Strikeouts: 2
- Stats at Baseball Reference

Teams
- Pittsburgh Pirates (1958)

George Thomas Perez (December 29, 1937 – March 22, 2022) was an American professional baseball pitcher who appeared in four games, all in relief, in Major League Baseball for the 1958 Pittsburgh Pirates. The native of San Fernando, California, threw and batted right-handed, stood 6 feet 2 inches (1.88 m) tall and weighed 200 pounds (91 kg).

Perez signed with the Pirates in 1956 out of Verdugo Hills High School. He won 28 of 39 decisions in the lower and middle levels of minor league baseball during his first two seasons in pro ball, paving the way for his brief trial with the 1958 Pirates. His four-game stint included three well-pitched games, and one poor outing. The disappointing appearance came in his third MLB contest against the Los Angeles Dodgers, newly moved to Perez' native Southern California. On May 2, 1958, at the Los Angeles Memorial Coliseum, Perez relieved starting pitcher Bennie Daniels in the fourth inning with the Pirates leading 5–2. Daniels departed with one out and two runners on base. Perez allowed the inherited runners to score, gave up three more runs of his own, and recorded only one out before he was relieved by Curt Raydon. Perez was tagged with the eventual 9–5 defeat.

However, in Perez' other three games, encompassing eight full innings, he allowed only two earned runs against the Milwaukee Braves, Cincinnati Redlegs and San Francisco Giants. In all, he worked 81/3 big-league innings, and gave up nine hits, four bases on balls, and five earned runs. He struck out two.

Perez returned to the minors after his final appearance for Pittsburgh against the Giants on May 6, and stayed in the game into the 1961 campaign.
