= Giallombardo =

Giallombardo is an Italian surname. Notable people with the surname include:

- Andrea Giallombardo (born 1980), Italian footballer
- Bob Giallombardo (born 1937), American baseball player
- Mauro Giallombardo (born 1989), Argentine racing driver
- Mike Giallombardo (born 1982), American politician, businessman, and military officer
