= Pete Whisenant =

American baseball player (1929–1996)

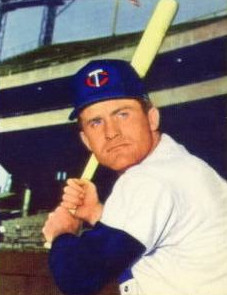
- Outfielder
- Born: December 14, 1929; Asheville, North Carolina, U.S.
- Died: March 22, 1996 (aged 66); Port Charlotte, Florida, U.S.
- Batted: Right Threw: Right

MLB debut
- April 16, 1952, for the Boston Braves

Last MLB appearance
- August 9, 1961, for the Cincinnati Reds

MLB statistics
- Batting average: .224
- Home runs: 37
- Runs batted in: 134
- Stats at Baseball Reference

Teams
- Boston Braves (1952); St. Louis Cardinals (1955); Chicago Cubs (1956); Cincinnati Redlegs/Reds (1957–1960); Cleveland Indians (1960); Washington Senators/Minnesota Twins (1960–1961); Cincinnati Redlegs/Reds (1961)

Thomas Peter Whisenant (December 14, 1929 – March 22, 1996) was an American outfielder and coach in Major League Baseball. Born in Asheville, North Carolina, Whisenant stood 6 ft 2 in (1.88 m) (188 cm), weighed 200 pounds (91 kg), and threw and batted right-handed.

== Baseball career ==
During his active career, Whisenant spent all or parts of eight seasons in the big leagues (1952; 1955–61), largely as a reserve outfielder and utility man. He played for the Boston Braves, St. Louis Cardinals, Chicago Cubs, Cincinnati Redlegs/Reds, Cleveland Indians and the Washington Senators/Minnesota Twins. During that span, he appeared in 475 games, with 221 hits in 988 at bats, for a .224 career batting average, with 37 home runs. In his only year as a semi-regular, in 1956, he played in 103 games for the Cubs and reached career highs in homers (11), RBI (46) and batting average (.239).

Whisenant is believed to be the only baseball player to appear in a box score for a team for which he did not play. On a day in 1960 when he had already been traded from the Indians to the Senators, he was announced as a pinch hitter for the Indians.

The incident occurred on Sunday, May 15. In the second game of a doubleheader against the Chicago White Sox at Cleveland Stadium, Whisenant was announced as hitting for Cleveland pitcher Gary Bell in the seventh inning. However, just minutes earlier, at 6 p.m., the Indians notified the American League office that Whisenant had been traded to Washington for second baseman Ken Aspromonte. The news apparently had not yet reached Cleveland manager Joe Gordon when he sent Whisenant into the game to bat against left-hander Frank Baumann. Playing the percentages, the White Sox brought in a right-handed hurler (Gerry Staley) to counter the move, whereupon Whisenant returned to the bench without hitting, to be replaced by a left-handed pinch hitter, Tito Francona. Chicago skipper Al López learned of the roster violation and played the game under protest. Francona did not affect the scoring in the game; he grounded out to end the frame. But Cleveland would go on to win 6–3, in extra innings.

Whisenant played the remainder of 1960 with the Senators, moved with the franchise when it became the Minnesota Twins after the season, then was released by the Twins on May 16, 1961. After returning to the Reds as a spare outfielder for three months, he was taken off the active list August 18 and then served as a Cincinnati coach under Fred Hutchinson for the latter weeks of the 1961 season through 1962. Then, after almost two decades away from baseball, Whisenant managed in the Oakland Athletics farm system in 1982–83; his Modesto A's won 94 games and the 1982 California League championship.

== Camp founder ==
Whisenant was also the founder of the Holiday Baseball Clinic for boys in Punta Gorda, Florida, held during the Christmas holidays in the late 1960s and 1970s. The Clinic took place at Charlotte High School and attracted well-known big league players as instructors, including Pete Rose, Johnny Bench, Mickey Mantle, Tommy Helms, Clay Carroll, Wayne Garrett, Don Zimmer, and Dave Bristol.

Whisenant died in Port Charlotte, Florida, at the age of 66.
