= Curt Raydon =

American baseball player (1933–2018)

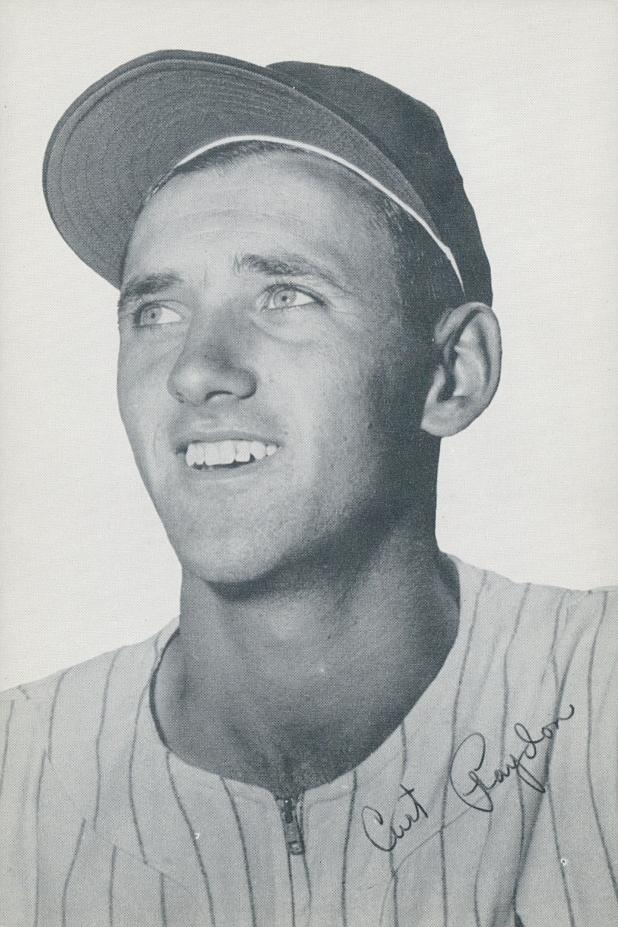
- Raydon with the Hollywood Stars c. 1957
- Pitcher
- Born: November 18, 1933; Bloomington, Illinois, U.S.
- Died: March 3, 2018 (aged 84); Sam Rayburn, Texas, U.S.
- Batted: Right Threw: Right

MLB debut
- April 15, 1958, for the Pittsburgh Pirates

Last MLB appearance
- September 14, 1958, for the Pittsburgh Pirates

MLB statistics
- Win–loss record: 8–4
- Earned run average: 3.62
- Strikeouts: 85
- Stats at Baseball Reference

Teams
- Pittsburgh Pirates (1958)

Curtis Lowell Raydon (November 18, 1933 – March 3, 2018) was an American professional baseball player, a right-handed pitcher whose career extended from 1953 through 1961. In 1958, he was a member of the Pittsburgh Pirates of Major League Baseball and had a strong rookie campaign, only to be sidetracked by injury; 1958 would be his only big-league season. Raydon was listed as 6 feet 4 inches (1.93 m) tall and 190 pounds (86 kg).

Born in Bloomington, Illinois, and a graduate of Bloomington High School, Raydon originally signed with the Milwaukee Braves before the 1953 season. After a successful pro debut in the Class A Sally League, he was included in a six-for-one trade to the Pirates on December 26, 1953, that netted the Braves second baseman Danny O'Connell. Raydon then spent four full years in the Pirates' farm system before making Pittsburgh's 1958 roster out of spring training.

Beginning the year in the bullpen, he notched a save in his first MLB appearance on April 15 against the Braves (the defending 1957 World Series champions) in Milwaukee. On May 25, he received his first starting assignment and took a regular turn in the Pirates' rotation from mid-June through mid-September. On June 12, he threw a two-hit, complete game 2–1 victory against the San Francisco Giants at Seals Stadium. Then, on July 25, he fired his second complete game, a four-hit shutout against the Giants, winning the 10–0 contest at Forbes Field.

Raydon finished the year with an 8–4 win–loss record, working in 31 games pitched, 20 as a starter. In 1341/3 innings pitched, he allowed 118 hits and 61 bases on balls. He struck out 85. His April 15 save and July 25 shutout were the only ones of his career. Both of his complete games came against the Giants.

The 1958 season would be Raydon's only season in the big leagues, however. A cyst on his finger and a sore arm forced his return to the minor leagues, where he pitched for three more seasons before leaving the game.

Raydon died March 3, 2018.
