= Dave Schmidt (catcher) =

American baseball player (1956–2026)

- Catcher
- Born: December 22, 1956; Mesa, Arizona, U.S.
- Died: January 19, 2026 (aged 69)
- Batted: Right Threw: Right

MLB debut
- April 28, 1981, for the Boston Red Sox

Last MLB appearance
- June 3, 1981, for the Boston Red Sox

MLB statistics
- Batting average: .238
- Home runs: 2
- Runs batted in: 3
- Stats at Baseball Reference

Teams
- Boston Red Sox (1981)

David Frederick Schmidt (December 22, 1956 – January 19, 2026) was an American professional baseball catcher. He played part of one season in Major League Baseball (MLB) for the Boston Red Sox in 1981. Schmidt was drafted by the Red Sox in the second round of the 1975 Major League Baseball draft and played his entire career in their organization.

Schmidt died on January 19, 2026, at the age of 69.
