= Don Williams (1958–1962 pitcher) =

American baseball player (1931–2011)

- Pitcher
- Born: September 14, 1931; Floyd, Virginia, U.S.
- Died: October 16, 2011 (aged 80); Floyd, Virginia, U.S.
- Batted: Right Threw: Right

MLB debut
- September 12, 1958, for the Pittsburgh Pirates

Last MLB appearance
- August 23, 1962, for the Kansas City Athletics

MLB statistics
- Win–loss record: 0–0
- Earned run average: 7.20
- Strikeouts: 7
- Stats at Baseball Reference

Teams
- Pittsburgh Pirates (1958–1959); Kansas City Athletics (1962)

Donald Fred Williams (September 14, 1931 – October 16, 2011) was an American professional baseball pitcher. He played in Major League Baseball (MLB) for the Pittsburgh Pirates and Kansas City Athletics. He was signed by the Pirates with his twin brother, Dewey Williams, who pitched several years in the minors.

Williams pitched in parts of three seasons for the Pirates and Athletics (1958, 1959, and 1962) making 11 relief appearances for a 7.20 career earned run average in 20 innings, and did not record a decision. His lone hit in four at-bats was a triple. Prior to that, he pitched for the University of Tennessee and nine seasons in the minor leagues.

Don and his brother, Dewey Williams, were Physical Ed teachers also in Montgomery County Maryland in the late 1950's and 60's.
