= Ron Blackburn =

American baseball player (1935–1998)

- Pitcher
- Born: April 23, 1935; Mount Airy, North Carolina, U.S.
- Died: April 29, 1998 (aged 63); Morganton, North Carolina, U.S.
- Batted: Right Threw: Right

MLB debut
- April 15, 1958, for the Pittsburgh Pirates

Last MLB appearance
- July 28, 1959, for the Pittsburgh Pirates

MLB statistics
- Win–loss record: 3–2
- Earned run average: 3.50
- Strikeouts: 50
- Stats at Baseball Reference

Teams
- Pittsburgh Pirates (1958–1959)

Ronald Hamilton Blackburn (April 23, 1935 – April 29, 1998) was an American Major League Baseball right-handed pitcher for the Pittsburgh Pirates during the 1958 and 1959 seasons.

== Career ==
Nicknamed "Blackie", he batted and threw right handed. Blackburn stood at 6 feet (1.83 m) and 160 pounds (73 kg) at the height of his career. He spent 11 seasons in the minor leagues and played two consecutive seasons for the Pirates.

His major league debut was on Opening Day 1958 against the Milwaukee Braves. The first batter he faced was Hank Aaron, who hit a single off Blackburn, but he managed to keep the next nine batters off base for his first victory.

On the road for his two years with the Pirates, Blackburn's roommate was Bill Mazeroski. During these two years, he also was a teammate of legendary outfielder Roberto Clemente.

Blackburn played his last game for Pittsburgh on July 28, 1959.

Year	Age	Team	League	Level
1953	18	Burlington-Graham Pirates	Carolina League	B
1953	18	Fond du Lac Panthers	Wisconsin State League	D
1954	19	St. Jean Canadians	Provincial League	C
1955	20	Phoenix Stars	Arizona–Mexico League	C
1955	20	Burlington-Graham Pirates	Carolina League	B
1956	21	Williamsport Grays	Eastern League	A
1956	21	New Orleans Pelicans	Southern Association	AA
1957	22	Columbus Jets	International League	AAA
1958	23	Pittsburgh Pirates	National League	MLB
1959	24	Columbus Jets	International League	AAA
1959	24	Pittsburgh Pirates	National League	MLB
1960	25	Columbus Jets	International League	AAA
1960	25	Salt Lake City Bees	Pacific Coast League	AAA
1961	26	Dallas-Fort Worth Rangers	American Association	AAA
1961	26	Macon Peaches	Southern Association	AA
1963	28	Columbus Jets	International League	AAA
1964	29	Columbus Jets	International League	AAA
1964	29	Asheville Tourists	Southern League	AAA

== Life ==
Born on April 23, 1935, in Mount Airy, North Carolina, Blackburn was raised in Kannapolis, North Carolina. He studied at Catawba College, where he met his wife Sandra Lower.

Following his playing retirement In 1964, Blackburn became a teacher and baseball coach at Western Carolina University, where he also attended school. He was the father of two sons: Ron H. Blackburn Jr. (born 1961) and Rick S. Blackburn (born 1964). The family lived in Cullowhee, North Carolina from 1964 to 1969 before moving to Morganton, North Carolina, where he worked as recreation director at the Western Correctional Center.

Blackburn died on April 29, 1998, from cancer at age 63. He is buried in Carolina Memorial Park, Concord, North Carolina.
