= Don Miles =

American baseball player (1936–2011)

- Outfielder
- Born: March 13, 1936; Indianapolis, Indiana, U.S.
- Died: April 26, 2011 (aged 75); Houston, Texas, U.S.
- Batted: Left Threw: Left

MLB debut
- September 9, 1958, for the Los Angeles Dodgers

Last MLB appearance
- September 20, 1958, for the Los Angeles Dodgers

MLB statistics
- Batting average: .182
- Home runs: 0
- Runs scored: 2
- Stats at Baseball Reference

Teams
- Los Angeles Dodgers (1958)

Donald Ray Miles (March 13, 1936 – April 26, 2011) was an American outfielder in Major League Baseball who played in eight games for the Los Angeles Dodgers during the 1958 season.

Miles was a four-sport star in football, basketball, baseball, and track at Ben Davis High School in Indianapolis from 1950 to 1954. He attended college at Indiana Central (today the University of Indianapolis) where he continued to play the same four sports as a freshman in 1954–55, starring as fullback on the football team as well as in the outfield in baseball. Miles returned for his sophomore year and played football in the fall of 1955, then quit school mid-year to sign with the Dodgers.
