= Ralph Mauriello =

American baseball player (born 1934)

- Pitcher
- Born: August 25, 1934 (age 92); Brooklyn, New York, U.S.
- Batted: Right Threw: Right

MLB debut
- September 13, 1958, for the Los Angeles Dodgers

Last MLB appearance
- September 27, 1958, for the Los Angeles Dodgers

MLB statistics
- Record: 1–1
- Earned run average: 4.63
- Strikeouts: 11
- Stats at Baseball Reference

Teams
- Los Angeles Dodgers (1958)

Ralph Mauriello (born August 25, 1934) is an American former professional baseball pitcher who appeared in three games in Major League Baseball for the Los Angeles Dodgers in 1958. Born in Brooklyn, where he was a Dodger fan, he moved with his family to Los Angeles when he was 14, graduated from North Hollywood High School, and was offered a baseball scholarship by the University of Southern California's legendary coach, Rod Dedeaux. His baseball career would touch both his native and adopted cities: signed by the Brooklyn Dodgers in 1952, he would make his only appearances for the parent team six years later, at the end of their first season in Los Angeles.

Mauriello threw and batted right-handed, and was listed as 6 feet 3 inches (1.91 m) tall and 195 pounds (88 kg). He climbed the ladder in the Dodger organization, winning 18 games (and losing eight) for the 1955 Mobile Bears of the Double-A Southern Association. His 1958 call-up came after a minor-league year split between Double-A and Triple-A. In his MLB debut September 13, a starting assignment against the Pittsburgh Pirates at Forbes Field, he lasted only one-third of an inning; of the five batters he faced, three made hits and a fourth took a base on balls. Charged with three earned runs, he was tagged with the Dodgers' eventual 9–4 defeat. But, six days later, he started against the Chicago Cubs at Wrigley Field, permitted only one run on five hits, and racked up his first MLB victory, 5–1. Eight days later, at the Los Angeles Memorial Coliseum, he came in against the Cubs as a middle reliever in the third inning of a 1–1 deadlock. Mauriello allowed only one hit through three innings, as the Dodgers built a 4–1 lead. But in the sixth frame, he gave up a two-run homer to Bobby Thomson, and exited the game with the Dodgers still ahead, 4–3. The Los Angeles bullpen could not hold the advantage, though: Chicago rallied in the ninth inning to win 7–4 in what would be Mauriello's final big-league game.

Mauriello retired from baseball after the 1960 season, his eighth in the Dodger system. He earned his undergraduate degree from USC in electrical engineering in 1961, then a master's from UCLA in computer design, and built a successful career in the computer industry.

As a major leaguer, he split two decisions, and allowed six earned runs on ten hits and eight bases on balls in 112/3 innings pitched, with 11 strikeouts and a 4.63 earned run average.
