= Barry Cort =

Canadian baseball player (born 1956)

- Pitcher
- Born: April 15, 1956 (age 70); Toronto, Ontario, Canada
- Batted: Right Threw: Right

MLB debut
- April 22, 1977, for the Milwaukee Brewers

Last MLB appearance
- June 14, 1977, for the Milwaukee Brewers

MLB statistics
- Win–loss record: 1–1
- Earned run average: 3.33
- Strikeouts: 17
- Stats at Baseball Reference

Teams
- Milwaukee Brewers (1977)

Barry Lee Cort (born April 15, 1956) is a Canadian-American former professional baseball pitcher for the Milwaukee Brewers. Cort was born in Toronto but moved to Florida when he was six months old. He was selected in the fourth round of the 1974 draft. He only played one year, 1977, at the major league level. He pitched in seven games, three of which he started. From 1978 to 1981, he played for various minor league teams in the Milwaukee and Oakland farm systems.
