= Bob Giallombardo =

American baseball player (1937–2022)

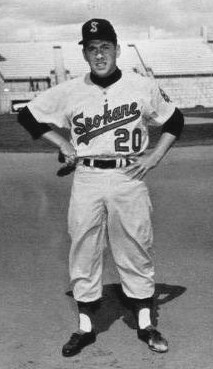
- Pitcher
- Born: May 20, 1937; Brooklyn, New York, U.S.
- Died: October 19, 2022 (aged 85); Waxhaw, North Carolina, U.S.
- Batted: Left Threw: Left

MLB debut
- June 21, 1958, for the Los Angeles Dodgers

Last MLB appearance
- July 27, 1958, for the Los Angeles Dodgers

MLB statistics
- Record: 1–1
- ERA: 3.76
- Strikeouts: 14
- Stats at Baseball Reference

Teams
- Los Angeles Dodgers (1958)

Robert Paul Giallombardo (May 20, 1937 – October 19, 2022) was an American professional baseball pitcher who appeared in six Major League Baseball games for the Los Angeles Dodgers during the 1958 season. Born in Brooklyn, New York, Giallombardo threw and batted left-handed, and was listed as 6 feet (1.8 m) tall and 175 pounds (79 kg).

== Early life and minor-league career ==
After attending Brooklyn's Lafayette High School and graduating from Sewanhaka High School of Floral Park, New York, Giallombardo signed with the nearby Brooklyn Dodgers and made his pro debut in 1956 in the Class D Pennsylvania–Ontario–New York League. The following year, he won 21 games and lost only six for the Reno Silver Sox of the Class C California League, then in the 1957–1958 offseason, he won ten games and lost only two in the Veracruz Winter League.

At the close of his second minor-league season, however, Giallombardo's Dodgers, stymied over efforts to replace Ebbets Field with a new facility, moved from his hometown to Los Angeles.

== With the Dodgers ==
In 1958, Giallombardo was promoted all the way to the Triple-A Montreal Royals, and a fast start earned him an early summer call-up to the Dodgers. He made his National League debut as the starting pitcher on June 21 against the Pittsburgh Pirates at Forbes Field. Staked to a 6–2 lead, Giallombardo loaded the bases with no outs in the fifth inning before leaving the contest. The Dodger bullpen allowed those runners to score, and the Pirates took the lead, eventually winning 11–7 with Ed Roebuck taking the loss.

Giallombardo make four more starts over the next five weeks, including two effective appearances against the heavy-hitting Cincinnati Redlegs. The first, on June 24 at Crosley Field, netted him a no-decision after 61/3 innings in a game the Dodgers eventually won 7–2 (with Sandy Koufax earning the save). But the second, on July 13 at the Los Angeles Memorial Coliseum, saw Giallombardo go 81/3 innings, allow only two runs (one earned), and gain credit for the 3–2 victory, with Clem Labine nailing down the save.

== Later career and retirement ==
After one more MLB appearance, Giallombardo returned to Montreal, where he eventually won 12 games. But he soon suffered an arm injury, underwent surgery, and was never able to return to the majors. He retired after the 1961 season after six years in the Dodger organization. In his six games for the Dodgers, he compiled a 1–1 won–lost record and a 3.76 earned run average, working 261/3 innings and allowing 29 hits, 11 earned runs, and 15 bases on balls; he struck out 14.

Giallombardo returned to Brooklyn and worked in private business and for the New York City Housing Authority before retiring to North Carolina in 1999. He died on October 19, 2022, aged 85.
