= Glenn Liebhardt (1900s pitcher) =

American baseball player (1883–1956)

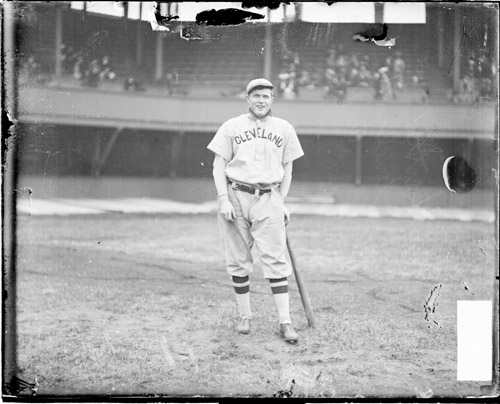
- Pitcher
- Born: March 10, 1883; Milton, Indiana, U.S.
- Died: July 13, 1956 (aged 73); Cleveland, Ohio, U.S.
- Batted: Right Threw: Right

MLB debut
- October 2, 1906, for the Cleveland Naps

Last MLB appearance
- August 5, 1909, for the Cleveland Naps

MLB statistics
- Win–loss record: 36–35
- Earned run average: 2.17
- Strikeouts: 280
- Stats at Baseball Reference

Teams
- Cleveland Naps (1906–1909)

Glenn John Liebhardt (March 10, 1883 – July 13, 1956) was an American Major League Baseball pitcher who played for four seasons for the Cleveland Naps from 1906 to 1909.

Glenn's son, Glenn Ignatius Liebhardt, was also a major league pitcher.
