= Glenn Liebhardt (1930s pitcher) =

American baseball player (1910-1992)

- Pitcher
- Born: July 31, 1910; Cleveland, Ohio, U.S.
- Died: March 14, 1992 (aged 81); Winston-Salem, North Carolina, U.S.
- Batted: Right Threw: Right

MLB debut
- April 22, 1930, for the Philadelphia Athletics

Last MLB appearance
- August 9, 1938, for the St. Louis Browns

MLB statistics
- Win–loss record: 0–1
- Strikeouts: 23
- Earned run average: 8.96
- Stats at Baseball Reference

Teams
- Philadelphia Athletics (1930); St. Louis Browns (1936, 1938)

Glenn Ignatius Liebhardt (July 31, 1910 – March 14, 1992) was an American Major League Baseball pitcher who played for three seasons. He played for the Philadelphia Athletics in 1930 and the St. Louis Browns in 1936 and 1938.

Glenn's father, Glenn John Liebhardt, was also a major league pitcher.

== See also ==
- List of second-generation Major League Baseball players
