= 1956 Chicago Cubs season =

1956 Chicago Cubs
- League: National League
- Ballpark: Wrigley Field
- City: Chicago
- Record: 60–94 (.390)
- League place: 8th
- Owners: Philip K. Wrigley
- General managers: Wid Matthews
- Managers: Stan Hack
- Television: WGN-TV (Jack Brickhouse, Harry Creighton, Vince Lloyd)
- Radio: WIND (Milo Hamilton, Jack Quinlan, Gene Elston)

The 1956 Chicago Cubs season was the 85th season of the Chicago Cubs franchise, the 81st in the National League and the 41st at Wrigley Field. The Cubs finished eighth and last in the National League with a record of 60–94.

== Offseason ==
- November 27, 1955: 1955 rule 5 draft
  - Billy Muffett was drafted from the Cubs by the St. Louis Cardinals.
  - Vito Valentinetti was drafted by the Cubs from the Toronto Maple Leafs.
- November 28, 1955: Hal Jeffcoat was traded by the Cubs to the Cincinnati Redlegs for Hobie Landrith.
- December 9, 1955: Frank Baumholtz was purchased from the Cubs by the Philadelphia Phillies.
- December 9, 1955: Randy Jackson and Don Elston were traded by the Cubs to the Brooklyn Dodgers for Don Hoak, Russ Meyer, and Walt Moryn.
- March 30, 1956: Hank Sauer was traded by the Cubs to the St. Louis Cardinals for Pete Whisenant.

== Regular season ==
=== Season standings ===
National League
Team	W	L	Pct.	GB	Home	Road
Brooklyn Dodgers	93	61	.604	—	52‍–‍25	41‍–‍36
Milwaukee Braves	92	62	.597	1	47‍–‍29	45‍–‍33
Cincinnati Redlegs	91	63	.591	2	51‍–‍26	40‍–‍37
St. Louis Cardinals	76	78	.494	17	43‍–‍34	33‍–‍44
Philadelphia Phillies	71	83	.461	22	40‍–‍37	31‍–‍46
New York Giants	67	87	.435	26	37‍–‍40	30‍–‍47
Pittsburgh Pirates	66	88	.429	27	35‍–‍43	31‍–‍45
Chicago Cubs	60	94	.390	33	39‍–‍38	21‍–‍56

=== Record vs. opponents ===
1956 National League record Sources:
Team	BRO	CHC	CIN	MIL	NYG	PHI	PIT	STL
Brooklyn	—	16–6	11–11	10–12	14–8	13–9	13–9	16–6
Chicago	6–16	—	6–16–1	9–13	7–15	13–9	10–12–1	9–13–1
Cincinnati	11–11	16–6–1	—	9–13	14–8	11–11	17–5	13–9
Milwaukee	12–10	13–9	13–9	—	17–5	10–12	14–8–1	13–9
New York	8–14	15–7	8–14	5–17	—	11–11	13–9	7–15
Philadelphia	9–13	9–13	11–11	12–10	11–11	—	7–15	12–10
Pittsburgh	9–13	12–10–1	5–17	8–14–1	9–13	15–7	—	8–14–1
St. Louis	6–16	13–9–1	9–13	9–13	15–7	10–12	14–8–1	—

=== Roster ===
1956 Chicago Cubs
Roster
Pitchers: 15 John Briggs; 42 Jim Brosnan; 22 Jim Davis; 26 Moe Drabowsky; 18 Warren Hacker; 53 Dave Hillman; 25 Jim Hughes; 27 Sam Jones; 45 Don Kaiser; 31 Turk Lown; 34 Russ Meyer; 24 Paul Minner; 50 George Piktuzis; 17 Bob Rush; 33 Bill Tremel; 57 Vito Valentinetti	Catchers: 32 Harry Chiti; 1 Jim Fanning; 15 Hobie Landrith; 8 Clyde McCullough; 55 El Tappe; Infielders: 37 Gene Baker; 14 Ernie Banks; 40 Dee Fondy; 7 Don Hoak; 5 Frank Kellert; 23 Jerry Kindall; 21 Eddie Miksis; 12 Ed Winceniak	Outfielders: 47 Solly Drake; 39 Monte Irvin; 48 Jim King; 43 Walt Moryn; 2 Gale Wade; 30 Pete Whisenant; Other batters: 3 Owen Friend; 10 Richie Myers	Manager: 6 Stan Hack; Coaches: 41 Ray Blades; 20 Dutch Leonard; 19 Pepper Martin

== Player stats ==
=== Batting ===
==== Starters by position ====
Note: Pos = Position; G = Games played; AB = At bats; H = Hits; Avg. = Batting average; HR = Home runs; RBI = Runs batted in

Pos	Player	G	AB	H	Avg.	HR	RBI
C	Hobie Landrith	111	312	69	.221	4	32
1B	Dee Fondy	137	543	146	.269	9	46
2B	Gene Baker	140	546	141	.258	12	57
SS	Ernie Banks	139	538	160	.297	28	85
3B	Don Hoak	121	424	91	.215	5	37
LF	Monte Irvin	111	339	92	.271	15	50
CF	Pete Whisenant	103	314	75	.239	11	46
RF	Walt Moryn	147	529	151	.285	23	67

==== Other batters ====
Note: G = Games played; AB = At bats; H = Hits; Avg. = Batting average; HR = Home runs; RBI = Runs batted in

Player	G	AB	H	Avg.	HR	RBI
Eddie Miksis	114	356	85	.239	9	27
Jim King	118	317	79	.249	15	54
Solly Drake	65	215	55	.256	2	15
Harry Chiti	72	203	43	.212	4	18
Frank Kellert	71	129	24	.186	4	17
Jerry Kindall	32	55	9	.164	0	0
Clyde McCullough	14	19	4	.211	0	1
Ed Winceniak	15	17	2	.118	0	0
Gale Wade	10	12	0	.000	0	0
Jim Fanning	1	4	1	.250	0	0
Owen Friend	2	2	0	.000	0	0
Richie Myers	4	1	0	.000	0	0
El Tappe	3	1	0	.000	0	0

=== Pitching ===
==== Starting pitchers ====
Note: G = Games pitched; IP = Innings pitched; W = Wins; L = Losses; ERA = Earned run average; SO = Strikeouts

Player	G	IP	W	L	ERA	SO
Bob Rush	32	239.2	13	10	3.19	104
Sam Jones	33	188.2	9	14	3.91	176
Warren Hacker	34	168.0	3	13	4.66	65
Don Kaiser	27	150.1	4	9	3.59	74
Moe Drabowsky	9	51.0	2	4	2.47	36
Paul Minner	10	47.0	2	5	6.89	14
Dave Hillman	2	12.1	0	2	2.19	6

==== Other pitchers ====
Note: G = Games pitched; IP = Innings pitched; W = Wins; L = Losses; ERA = Earned run average; SO = Strikeouts

Player	G	IP	W	L	ERA	SO
Jim Davis	46	120.1	5	7	3.66	66
Jim Brosnan	30	95.0	5	9	3.79	51
Russ Meyer	20	57.0	1	6	6.32	28

==== Relief pitchers ====
Note: G = Games pitched; W = Wins; L = Losses; SV = Saves; ERA = Earned run average; SO = Strikeouts

Player	G	W	L	SV	ERA	SO
Turk Lown	61	9	8	13	3.58	74
Vito Valentinetti	42	6	4	1	3.78	26
Jim Hughes	25	1	3	0	5.16	20
John Briggs	3	0	0	0	1.69	1
George Piktuzis	2	0	0	0	7.20	3
Bill Tremel	1	0	0	0	9.00	0

== Farm system ==
Level	Team	League	Manager
Open	Los Angeles Angels	Pacific Coast League	Bob Scheffing
AA	Tulsa Oilers	Texas League	Al Widmar
A	Des Moines Bruins	Western League	Lou Klein
B	Burlington Bees	Illinois–Indiana–Iowa League	Ed McDade
C	Lafayette Oilers	Evangeline League	Ken Raffensberger
C	Magic Valley Cowboys	Pioneer League	Al Zarilla and Billy Raimondi
D	Crestview Braves	Alabama–Florida League	Walt Dixon
D	Paris Lakers	Midwest League	Marty Purtell
D	Ponca City Cubs	Sooner State League	Don Biebel

LEAGUE CHAMPIONS: Los Angeles, Paris; LEAGUE CO-CHAMPIONS: Lafayette
