= 1955 Chicago Cubs season =

1955 Chicago Cubs
- League: National League
- Ballpark: Wrigley Field
- City: Chicago
- Record: 72–81 (.471)
- League place: 6th
- Owners: Philip K. Wrigley
- General managers: Wid Matthews
- Managers: Stan Hack
- Television: WGN-TV (Jack Brickhouse, Harry Creighton)
- Radio: WIND (Bert Wilson, Milo Hamilton, Jack Quinlan, Gene Elston)

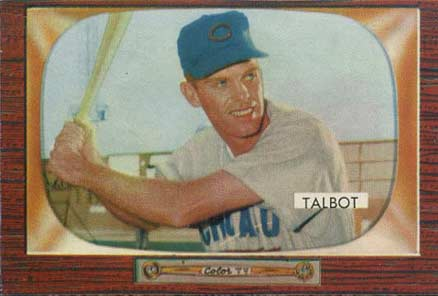

The 1955 Chicago Cubs season was the 84th season of the Chicago Cubs franchise, the 80th in the National League and the 40th at Wrigley Field. The Cubs finished sixth in the National League with a record of 72–81.

== Offseason ==
- October 1, 1954: Johnny Klippstein and Jim Willis were traded by the Cubs to the Cincinnati Redlegs for Jim Bolger, Harry Perkowski and Ted Tappe.
- November 16, 1954: Ralph Kiner was sent by the Cubs to the Cleveland Indians for $60,000 as part of an earlier deal (the Cubs sent a player to be named later to the Indians for Sam Jones and players to be named later) made on September 30, 1954. The Indians sent Gale Wade to the Cubs on November 30 to complete the trade.
- November 22, 1954: Jim King was drafted by the Cubs from the St. Louis Cardinals in the 1954 rule 5 draft.

== Regular season ==
- May 10, 1955: Duke Snider of the Brooklyn Dodgers hit the 200th HR of his career against the Cubs. The opposing pitcher was Warren Hacker and the home run was hit at Wrigley Field.
- May 12, 1955: Sam Jones of the Cubs became the first black pitcher to throw a no-hitter in the major leagues. It was against the Pittsburgh Pirates.

=== Season standings ===
National League
Team	W	L	Pct.	GB	Home	Road
Brooklyn Dodgers	98	55	.641	—	56‍–‍21	42‍–‍34
Milwaukee Braves	85	69	.552	13½	46‍–‍31	39‍–‍38
New York Giants	80	74	.519	18½	44‍–‍35	36‍–‍39
Philadelphia Phillies	77	77	.500	21½	46‍–‍31	31‍–‍46
Cincinnati Redlegs	75	79	.487	23½	46‍–‍31	29‍–‍48
Chicago Cubs	72	81	.471	26	43‍–‍33	29‍–‍48
St. Louis Cardinals	68	86	.442	30½	41‍–‍36	27‍–‍50
Pittsburgh Pirates	60	94	.390	38½	36‍–‍39	24‍–‍55

=== Record vs. opponents ===
1955 National League record Sources:
Team	BRO	CHC	CIN	MIL	NYG	PHI	PIT	STL
Brooklyn	—	14–7–1	12–10	15–7	13–9	16–6	14–8	14–8
Chicago	7–14–1	—	11–11	7–15	12–10	10–12	11–11	14–8
Cincinnati	10–12	11–11	—	9–13	9–13	11–11	14–8	11–11
Milwaukee	7–15	15–7	13–9	—	14–8	14–8	11–11	11–11
New York	9–13	10–12	13–9	8–14	—	10–12	17–5	13–9
Philadelphia	6–16	12–10	11–11	8–14	12–10	—	15–7	13–9
Pittsburgh	8–14	11–11	8–14	11–11	5–17	7–15	—	10–12
St. Louis	8–14	8–14	11–11	11–11	9–13	9–13	12–10	—

=== Notable transactions ===
- April 16, 1955: Lloyd Merriman was purchased by the Cubs from the Chicago White Sox.
- June 12, 1955: Owen Friend was purchased by the Cubs from the Boston Red Sox.
- August 19, 1955: George Altman was signed as an amateur free agent by the Cubs.
- August 19, 1955: J. C. Hartman was signed as an amateur free agent by the Cubs.

=== Roster ===
1955 Chicago Cubs
Roster
Pitchers: 35 Vicente Amor; 29 John André; 23 Bubba Church; 42 Hy Cohen; 22 Jim Davis; 18 Warren Hacker; 53 Dave Hillman; 19 Hal Jeffcoat; 27 Sam Jones; 45 Don Kaiser; 24 Paul Minner; 43 Harry Perkowski; 16 Howie Pollet; 17 Bob Rush; 26 Bob Thorpe; 33 Bill Tremel	Catchers: 32 Harry Chiti; 25 Walker Cooper; 1 Jim Fanning; 8 Clyde McCullough; 55 El Tappe; Infielders: 37 Gene Baker; 14 Ernie Banks; 40 Dee Fondy; 3 Owen Friend; 2 Randy Jackson; 5 Vern Morgan	Outfielders: 7 Frank Baumholtz; 30 Jim Bolger; 48 Jim King; 28 Lloyd Merriman; 21 Eddie Miksis; 9 Hank Sauer; 11 Bob Speake; 4 Ted Tappe; 3 Gale Wade; Other batters: 31 Al Lary	Manager: 6 Stan Hack; Coaches: 41 Ray Blades; 46 Ray Hayworth; 20 Dutch Leonard; 46 Bob Scheffing

== Player stats ==
=== Batting ===
==== Starters by position ====
Note: Pos = Position; G = Games played; AB = At bats; H = Hits; Avg. = Batting average; HR = Home runs; RBI = Runs batted in

Pos	Player	G	AB	H	Avg.	HR	RBI
C	Harry Chiti	113	338	78	.231	11	41
1B	Dee Fondy	150	574	152	.265	17	65
2B	Gene Baker	154	609	163	.268	11	52
SS	Ernie Banks	154	596	176	.295	44	117
3B	Randy Jackson	138	499	132	.265	21	70
LF	Hank Sauer	79	261	55	.211	12	28
CF	Eddie Miksis	131	481	113	.235	9	41
RF	Jim King	113	301	77	.256	11	45

==== Other batters ====
Note: G = Games played; AB = At bats; H = Hits; Avg. = Batting average; HR = Home runs; RBI = Runs batted in

Player	G	AB	H	Avg.	HR	RBI
Frank Baumholtz	105	280	81	.289	1	27
Bob Speake	95	261	57	.218	12	43
Jim Bolger	64	160	33	.206	0	7
Lloyd Merriman	72	145	31	.214	1	8
Walker Cooper	54	111	31	.279	7	15
Clyde McCullough	44	81	16	.198	0	10
Ted Tappe	23	50	13	.260	4	10
Gale Wade	9	33	6	.182	1	1
Jim Fanning	5	10	0	.000	0	0
Owen Friend	6	10	1	.100	0	0
Vern Morgan	7	7	1	.143	0	1
El Tappe	2	0	0	----	0	0
Al Lary	4	0	0	----	0	0

=== Pitching ===
==== Starting pitchers ====
Note: G = Games pitched; IP = Innings pitched; W = Wins; L = Losses; ERA = Earned run average; SO = Strikeouts

Player	G	IP	W	L	ERA	SO
Sam Jones	36	241.2	14	20	4.10	198
Bob Rush	33	234.0	13	11	3.50	130
Warren Hacker	35	213.0	11	15	4.27	80
Paul Minner	22	157.2	9	9	3.48	53

==== Other pitchers ====
Note: G = Games pitched; IP = Innings pitched; W = Wins; L = Losses; ERA = Earned run average; SO = Strikeouts

Player	G	IP	W	L	ERA	SO
Jim Davis	42	133.2	7	11	4.44	62
Howie Pollet	24	61.0	4	3	5.61	27
Hy Cohen	7	17.0	0	0	7.94	4

==== Relief pitchers ====
Note: G = Games pitched; W = Wins; L = Losses; SV = Saves; ERA = Earned run average; SO = Strikeouts

Player	G	W	L	SV	ERA	SO
Hal Jeffcoat	50	8	6	6	2.95	32
Dave Hillman	25	0	0	0	5.31	23
Harry Perkowski	25	3	4	2	5.29	28
Bill Tremel	23	3	0	2	3.72	13
John André	22	0	1	1	5.80	19
Don Kaiser	11	0	0	0	5.40	11
Vicente Amor	4	0	1	0	4.50	3
Bubba Church	2	0	0	1	5.40	3
Bob Thorpe	2	0	0	0	3.00	0

== Farm system ==
Level	Team	League	Manager
Open	Los Angeles Angels	Pacific Coast League	Bill Sweeney, Jack Warner and Bob Scheffing
A	Macon Peaches	Sally League	Pepper Martin and Ivy Griffin
A	Des Moines Bruins	Western League	Les Peden and Pepper Martin
B	Burlington Bees	Illinois–Indiana–Iowa League	Hal Meek
C	Vicksburg Hill Billies	Cotton States League	Fred Williams
C	Lafayette Oilers	Evangeline League	Lou Klein
C	Magic Valley Cowboys	Pioneer League	Ed McDade
D	Paris Lakers	Mississippi–Ohio Valley League	Dick Rigazio
D	Gainesville Owls/Ponca City Cubs	Sooner State League	Ed Carnett

LEAGUE CHAMPIONS: Lafayette, Magic Valley

Gainesville franchise transferred to Ponca City and renamed, May 19, 1955
