= 1954 Chicago Cubs season =

1954 Chicago Cubs
- League: National League
- Ballpark: Wrigley Field
- City: Chicago
- Record: 64–90 (.416)
- League place: 7th
- Owners: Philip K. Wrigley
- General managers: Wid Matthews
- Managers: Stan Hack
- Television: WGN-TV (Jack Brickhouse, Harry Creighton)
- Radio: WIND (Bert Wilson, Bob Elson)

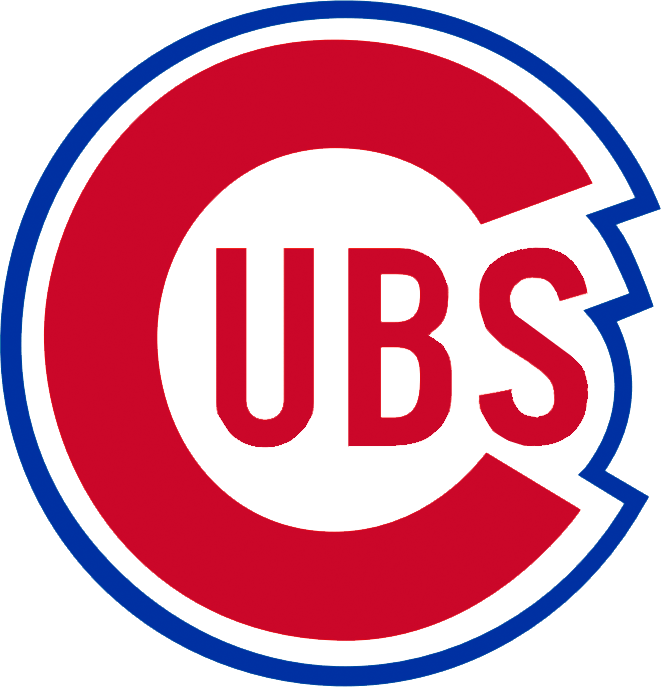
The logo for the Chicago Cubs baseball team from 1941 to 1956.

The 1954 Chicago Cubs season was the 83rd season of the Chicago Cubs franchise, the 79th in the National League and the 39th at Wrigley Field. The Cubs finished seventh in the National League with a record of 64–90.

== Offseason ==
- November 30, 1953: Carl Sawatski was selected off waivers from the Cubs by the Chicago White Sox.
- December 7, 1953: Catfish Metkovich was purchased from the Cubs by the Milwaukee Braves.

== Regular season ==
=== Season standings ===
National League
Team	W	L	Pct.	GB	Home	Road
New York Giants	97	57	.630	—	53‍–‍23	44‍–‍34
Brooklyn Dodgers	92	62	.597	5	45‍–‍32	47‍–‍30
Milwaukee Braves	89	65	.578	8	43‍–‍34	46‍–‍31
Philadelphia Phillies	75	79	.487	22	39‍–‍39	36‍–‍40
Cincinnati Redlegs	74	80	.481	23	41‍–‍36	33‍–‍44
St. Louis Cardinals	72	82	.468	25	33‍–‍44	39‍–‍38
Chicago Cubs	64	90	.416	33	40‍–‍37	24‍–‍53
Pittsburgh Pirates	53	101	.344	44	31‍–‍46	22‍–‍55

=== Record vs. opponents ===
1954 National League record Sources:
Team	BRO	CHC	CIN	MIL	NYG	PHI	PIT	STL
Brooklyn	—	15–7	16–6	10–12	9–13	13–9	15–7	14–8
Chicago	7–15	—	8–14	6–16	7–15	7–15	15–7	14–8
Cincinnati	6–16	14–8	—	10–12	7–15	14–8	15–7	8–14
Milwaukee	12–10	16–6	12–10	—	10–12	13–9	14–8	12–10
New York	13–9	15–7	15–7	12–10	—	16–6	14–8	12–10
Philadelphia	9–13	15–7	8–14	9–13	6–16	—	16–6	12–10
Pittsburgh	7–15	7–15	7–15	8–14	8–14	6–16	—	10–12
St. Louis	8–14	8–14	14–8	10–12	10–12	10–12	12–10	—

=== Notable transactions ===
- April 30, 1954: Steve Bilko was purchased by the Cubs from the St. Louis Cardinals for $12,500.
- June 8, 1954: Billy Muffett was purchased by the Cubs from the Shreveport Sports.
- June 14, 1954: Luis Márquez was traded by the Cubs to the Pittsburgh Pirates for Hal Rice.
- September 8, 1954: Joe Garagiola was selected off waivers from the Cubs by the New York Giants.

=== Roster ===
1954 Chicago Cubs
Roster
Pitchers: 27 Jim Brosnan; 23 Bubba Church; 23,39 Dave Cole; 22 Jim Davis; 18 Warren Hacker; 19 Hal Jeffcoat; 36 Johnny Klippstein; 31 Al Lary; 35 Turk Lown; 24 Paul Minner; 16 Howie Pollet; 34 John Pyecha; 17 Bob Rush; 33 Bill Tremel; 28 Jim Willis; 38 Bob Zick	Catchers: 25 Walker Cooper; 48 Jim Fanning; 11 Joe Garagiola; 8 Clyde McCullough; 55 El Tappe; Infielders: 37 Gene Baker; 14 Ernie Banks; 39,49 Steve Bilko; 40 Dee Fondy; 2 Randy Jackson; 12 Chris Kitsos; 21 Eddie Miksis; 30 Vern Morgan; 1 Bill Serena	Outfielders: 7 Frank Baumholtz; 4 Ralph Kiner; 48 Luis Márquez; 28 Hal Rice; 52 Don Robertson; 9 Hank Sauer; 10 Bob Talbot; Other batters: 5 Bruce Edwards	Manager: 6 Stan Hack; Coaches: 41 Ray Blades; 20 Dutch Leonard; 46 Bob Scheffing

== Player stats ==
=== Batting ===
==== Starters by position ====
Note: Pos = Position; G = Games played; AB = At bats; H = Hits; Avg. = Batting average; HR = Home runs; RBI = Runs batted in

Pos	Player	G	AB	H	Avg.	HR	RBI
C	Joe Garagiola	63	153	43	.281	5	21
1B	Dee Fondy	141	568	162	.285	9	49
2B	Gene Baker	135	541	149	.275	13	61
SS	Ernie Banks	154	593	163	.275	19	79
3B	Randy Jackson	126	484	132	.273	19	67
LF	Ralph Kiner	147	557	159	.285	22	73
CF	Bob Talbot	114	403	97	.241	1	19
RF	Hank Sauer	142	520	150	.288	41	103

==== Other batters ====
Note: G = Games played; AB = At bats; H = Hits; Avg. = Batting average; HR = Home runs; RBI = Runs batted in

Player	G	AB	H	Avg.	HR	RBI
Frank Baumholtz	90	303	90	.297	4	28
Walker Cooper	57	158	49	.310	7	32
El Tappe	46	119	22	.185	0	4
Eddie Miksis	38	99	20	.202	2	3
Steve Bilko	47	92	22	.239	4	12
Clyde McCullough	31	81	21	.259	3	17
Hal Rice	51	72	11	.153	0	5
Vern Morgan	24	64	15	.234	0	2
Bill Serena	41	63	10	.159	4	13
Jim Fanning	11	38	7	.184	0	1
Luis Márquez	17	12	1	.083	0	0
Don Robertson	14	6	0	.000	0	0
Bruce Edwards	4	3	0	.000	0	1
Chris Kitsos	1	0	0	----	0	0

=== Pitching ===
==== Starting pitchers ====
Note: G = Games pitched; IP = Innings pitched; W = Wins; L = Losses; ERA = Earned run average; SO = Strikeouts

Player	G	IP	W	L	ERA	SO
Bob Rush	33	236.1	13	15	3.77	124
Paul Minner	32	218.0	11	11	3.96	79
Howie Pollet	20	128.1	8	10	3.58	58
Dave Cole	18	84.0	3	8	5.36	37
Al Lary	1	6.0	0	0	3.00	4

==== Other pitchers ====
Note: G = Games pitched; IP = Innings pitched; W = Wins; L = Losses; ERA = Earned run average; SO = Strikeouts

Player	G	IP	W	L	ERA	SO
Warren Hacker	39	158.2	6	13	4.25	80
Johnny Klippstein	36	148.0	4	11	5.29	69
Jim Davis	46	127.2	11	7	3.52	58
Bubba Church	7	14.2	1	3	9.82	8

==== Relief pitchers ====
Note: G = Games pitched; W = Wins; L = Losses; SV = Saves; ERA = Earned run average; SO = Strikeouts

Player	G	W	L	SV	ERA	SO
Hal Jeffcoat	43	5	6	7	5.19	35
Bill Tremel	33	1	2	4	4.21	21
Jim Brosnan	18	1	0	0	9.45	17
Turk Lown	15	0	2	0	6.14	16
Jim Willis	14	0	1	0	3.91	5
Bob Zick	8	0	0	0	8.27	9
John Pyecha	1	0	1	0	10.13	2

== Farm system ==
Level	Team	League	Manager
Open	Los Angeles Angels	Pacific Coast League	Bill Sweeney
AA	Beaumont Exporters	Texas League	Les Fleming and Mickey Livingston
A	Macon Peaches	Sally League	Nick Cullop
A	Des Moines Bruins	Western League	Les Peden
B	Cedar Rapids Indians	Illinois–Indiana–Iowa League	Bill Prince
C	Stockton Ports	California League	Gene Handley
C	Magic Valley Cowboys	Pioneer League	Everett Robinson
C	Blackwell Broncos	Western Association	Joe Consoli and Al Kubski
D	Gainesville Owls	Sooner State League	Dick Rigazio
D	Hickory Rebels	Tar Heel League	Charlie Teague

LEAGUE CHAMPIONS: Des Moines, Blackwell
Tar Heel League disbanded, June 21, 1954
