= 1954 Cincinnati Redlegs season =

1954 Cincinnati Redlegs
- League: National League
- Ballpark: Crosley Field
- City: Cincinnati
- Owners: Powel Crosley Jr.
- General managers: Gabe Paul
- Managers: Birdie Tebbetts
- Television: WCPO-TV (Waite Hoyt, Bob Gilmore)
- Radio: WCPO (Waite Hoyt, Bob Gilmore)

The 1954 Cincinnati Redlegs season was a season in American baseball. The team finished fifth in the National League with a record of 74–80, 23 games behind the New York Giants.

== Offseason ==
- October 6, 1953: Art Fowler was acquired by the Redlegs from the Milwaukee Braves as part of a conditional deal.
- December 1, 1953: Brooks Lawrence was drafted from the Redlegs by the St. Louis Cardinals in the 1953 minor league draft.

== Regular season ==
- April 17, 1954: In the seventh inning of the Redlegs' third game of 1954, against the Milwaukee Braves at County Stadium, Nino Escalera became the first black player in the history of the Cincinnati franchise. Escalera, an Afro-Latin American from Puerto Rico, pinch hits for Andy Seminick and singles off Lew Burdette. The next batter for the Redlegs is another pinch hitter, Chuck Harmon, who bats for Corky Valentine; Harmon becomes the team's first-ever African-American player.

=== Season standings ===
National League
Team	W	L	Pct.	GB	Home	Road
New York Giants	97	57	.630	—	53‍–‍23	44‍–‍34
Brooklyn Dodgers	92	62	.597	5	45‍–‍32	47‍–‍30
Milwaukee Braves	89	65	.578	8	43‍–‍34	46‍–‍31
Philadelphia Phillies	75	79	.487	22	39‍–‍39	36‍–‍40
Cincinnati Redlegs	74	80	.481	23	41‍–‍36	33‍–‍44
St. Louis Cardinals	72	82	.468	25	33‍–‍44	39‍–‍38
Chicago Cubs	64	90	.416	33	40‍–‍37	24‍–‍53
Pittsburgh Pirates	53	101	.344	44	31‍–‍46	22‍–‍55

=== Record vs. opponents ===
1954 National League record Sources:
Team	BRO	CHC	CIN	MIL	NYG	PHI	PIT	STL
Brooklyn	—	15–7	16–6	10–12	9–13	13–9	15–7	14–8
Chicago	7–15	—	8–14	6–16	7–15	7–15	15–7	14–8
Cincinnati	6–16	14–8	—	10–12	7–15	14–8	15–7	8–14
Milwaukee	12–10	16–6	12–10	—	10–12	13–9	14–8	12–10
New York	13–9	15–7	15–7	12–10	—	16–6	14–8	12–10
Philadelphia	9–13	15–7	8–14	9–13	6–16	—	16–6	12–10
Pittsburgh	7–15	7–15	7–15	8–14	8–14	6–16	—	10–12
St. Louis	8–14	8–14	14–8	10–12	10–12	10–12	12–10	—

=== Notable transactions ===
- July 1954: Ernie Broglio was acquired by the Redlegs from the Oakland Oaks.
- August 7, 1954: Jim Pearce was purchased by the Redlegs from the Washington Senators.

=== Roster ===
1954 Cincinnati Redlegs
Roster
Pitchers: 46 Fred Baczewski; 34 Jackie Collum; 31,53 Karl Drews; 51 Art Fowler; 47 Howie Judson; 36 Jerry Lane; 39 Joe Nuxhall; 54 Jim Pearce; 35 Harry Perkowski; 36 Mario Picone; 38 Bud Podbielan; 36 Ken Raffensberger; 31 Cliff Ross; 42 Moe Savransky; 32 Frank Smith; 49 Corky Valentine; 31 Herm Wehmeier; 53 George Zuverink	Catchers: 6 Ed Bailey; 5 Hobie Landrith; 7 Andy Seminick; Infielders: 12 Bobby Adams; 14 Rocky Bridges; 10 Chuck Harmon; 18 Ted Kluszewski; 11 Roy McMillan; 16 Johnny Temple	Outfielders: 25 Gus Bell; 15,26 Jim Bolger; 24 Bob Borkowski; 21 Nino Escalera; 23 Jim Greengrass; 20 Lloyd Merriman; 28 Wally Post; Other batters: 15 Grady Hatton; 15 Johnny Lipon; 19 Dick Murphy; 19 Connie Ryan	Manager: 1 Birdie Tebbetts; Coaches: 2 Dick Bartell; 3 Tom Ferrick

== Player stats ==
= Indicates team leader

= Indicates league leader

=== Batting ===
==== Starters by position ====
Note: Pos = Position; G = Games played; AB = At bats; H = Hits; Avg. = Batting average; HR = Home runs; RBI = Runs batted in

Pos	Player	G	AB	H	Avg.	HR	RBI
C	Andy Seminick	86	247	58	.235	7	30
1B	Ted Kluszewski	149	573	187	.326	49	141
2B	Johnny Temple	146	505	155	.307	0	44
SS	Roy McMillan	154	588	147	.250	4	42
3B	Bobby Adams	110	390	105	.269	3	23
LF	Jim Greengrass	139	542	152	.280	27	92
CF	Gus Bell	153	619	185	.299	17	101
RF	Wally Post	130	451	115	.255	18	83

==== Other batters ====
Note: G = Games played; AB = At bats; H = Hits; Avg. = Batting average; HR = Home runs; RBI = Runs batted in

Player	G	AB	H	Avg.	HR	RBI
Chuck Harmon	94	286	68	.238	2	25
Ed Bailey	73	183	36	.197	9	20
Bob Borkowski	73	162	43	.265	1	19
Lloyd Merriman	73	112	30	.268	0	16
Hobie Landrith	48	81	16	.198	5	14
Nino Escalera	73	69	11	.159	0	3
Rocky Bridges	53	52	12	.231	0	2
Jim Bolger	5	3	1	.333	0	0
Grady Hatton	1	1	0	.000	0	0
Johnny Lipon	1	1	0	.000	0	0
Dick Murphy	6	1	0	.000	0	0
Connie Ryan	1	0	0	----	0	0

=== Pitching ===
==== Starting pitchers ====
Note: G = Games pitched; IP = Innings pitched; W = Wins; L = Losses; ERA = Earned run average; SO = Strikeouts

Player	G	IP	W	L	ERA	SO
Art Fowler	40	227.2	12	10	3.83	93
Corky Valentine	36	194.1	12	11	4.45	73
Bud Podbielan	27	131.0	7	10	5.36	42
Fred Baczewski	29	130.0	6	6	5.26	43

==== Other pitchers ====
Note: G = Games pitched; IP = Innings pitched; W = Wins; L = Losses; ERA = Earned run average; SO = Strikeouts

Player	G	IP	W	L	ERA	SO
Joe Nuxhall	35	166.2	12	5	3.89	85
Harry Perkowski	28	95.2	2	8	6.11	32
Howie Judson	37	93.1	5	7	3.95	27
Karl Drews	22	60.0	4	4	6.00	29
Herm Wehmeier	12	33.2	0	3	6.68	13
Jim Pearce	2	11.0	1	0	0.00	3
Ken Raffensberger	6	10.1	0	2	7.84	5
Mario Picone	4	10.1	0	1	6.10	1

==== Relief pitchers ====
Note: G = Games pitched; W = Wins; L = Losses; SV = Saves; ERA = Earned run average; SO = Strikeouts

Player	G	W	L	SV	ERA	SO
Frank Smith	50	5	8	20	2.67	51
Jackie Collum	36	7	3	0	3.76	28
Moe Savransky	16	0	2	0	4.88	7
Cliff Ross	4	0	0	1	0.00	1
Jerry Lane	3	1	0	0	1.69	2
George Zuverink	2	0	0	0	9.00	2

== Awards and honors ==
All-Star Game

- Ted Kluszewski, Outfield, Starter
- Gus Bell, Outfield, Reserve

== Farm system ==
Level	Team	League	Manager
AA	Tulsa Oilers	Texas League	Joe Schultz
A	Columbia Reds	Sally League	Ernie White
B	High Point-Thomasville Hi-Toms	Carolina League	Tommy Reis, Don Padgett and Fred Lanifero
B	Colonial Heights-Petersburg Colts	Piedmont League	Johnny Vander Meer
C	Maryville-Alcoa Twins/Morristown Reds	Mountain States League	Tuck McWilliams
C	Duluth Dukes	Northern League	Oscar Khedarian, Rip Wade and Danny Litwhiler
C	Ogden Reds	Pioneer League	Earle Brucker Sr.
D	Fort Walton Beach Jets	Alabama–Florida League	John Streza
D	Douglas Trojans	Georgia State League	Charles Bledsoe
D	Fitzgerald Redlegs	Georgia–Florida League	Red Treadway

Maryville-Alcoa franchise transferred to Morristown, June 19, 1954; Morristown club folded, July 7
