= 1956 New York Giants (MLB) season =

1956 New York Giants
- League: National League
- Ballpark: Polo Grounds
- City: New York City
- Record: 67–87 (.435)
- League place: 6th
- Owners: Horace Stoneham
- General managers: Chub Feeney
- Managers: Bill Rigney
- Television: WPIX (Russ Hodges, Bob DeLaney)
- Radio: WMCA (Russ Hodges, Bob DeLaney)

The 1956 New York Giants season was the franchise's 74th season. The team finished in sixth place in the National League with a 67–87 record, 26 games behind the Brooklyn Dodgers.

== Offseason ==
- December 3, 1956: Roger McCardell was drafted by the Giants from the Milwaukee Braves in the 1956 minor league draft.
- Prior to 1956 season: Ernie Broglio was purchased by the Giants from the Vancouver Mounties.

== Regular season ==
=== Season standings ===
National League
Team	W	L	Pct.	GB	Home	Road
Brooklyn Dodgers	93	61	.604	—	52‍–‍25	41‍–‍36
Milwaukee Braves	92	62	.597	1	47‍–‍29	45‍–‍33
Cincinnati Redlegs	91	63	.591	2	51‍–‍26	40‍–‍37
St. Louis Cardinals	76	78	.494	17	43‍–‍34	33‍–‍44
Philadelphia Phillies	71	83	.461	22	40‍–‍37	31‍–‍46
New York Giants	67	87	.435	26	37‍–‍40	30‍–‍47
Pittsburgh Pirates	66	88	.429	27	35‍–‍43	31‍–‍45
Chicago Cubs	60	94	.390	33	39‍–‍38	21‍–‍56

=== Record vs. opponents ===
1956 National League record Sources:
Team	BRO	CHC	CIN	MIL	NYG	PHI	PIT	STL
Brooklyn	—	16–6	11–11	10–12	14–8	13–9	13–9	16–6
Chicago	6–16	—	6–16–1	9–13	7–15	13–9	10–12–1	9–13–1
Cincinnati	11–11	16–6–1	—	9–13	14–8	11–11	17–5	13–9
Milwaukee	12–10	13–9	13–9	—	17–5	10–12	14–8–1	13–9
New York	8–14	15–7	8–14	5–17	—	11–11	13–9	7–15
Philadelphia	9–13	9–13	11–11	12–10	11–11	—	7–15	12–10
Pittsburgh	9–13	12–10–1	5–17	8–14–1	9–13	15–7	—	8–14–1
St. Louis	6–16	13–9–1	9–13	9–13	15–7	10–12	14–8–1	—

=== Notable transactions ===
- June 14, 1956: Alvin Dark, Don Liddle, Whitey Lockman and Ray Katt were traded by the Giants to the St. Louis Cardinals for Dick Littlefield, Jackie Brandt, Red Schoendienst, Bill Sarni and a player to be named later. The Cardinals completed the deal by sending Gordon Jones to the Giants on October 1.

=== Roster ===
1956 New York Giants
Roster
Pitchers: 43 Johnny Antonelli; 39 Jim Constable; 28,31 Rubén Gómez; 42 Marv Grissom; 21 Jim Hearn; 37 Don Liddle; 30 Dick Littlefield; 38 Joe Margoneri; 40 Windy McCall; 29 Mike McCormick; 41 Ramón Monzant; 44 Steve Ridzik; 36 Max Surkont; 49 Hoyt Wilhelm; 32 Al Worthington; 31 Roy Wright	Catchers: 14 Bobby Hofman; 8 Ray Katt; 33,53 Jim Mangan; 8,15 Bill Sarni; 9 Wes Westrum; Infielders: 34 Ed Bressoud; 12 Foster Castleman; 19 Alvin Dark; 15 Gail Harris; 10 Red Schoendienst; 20 Daryl Spencer; 10 Wayne Terwilliger; 16 Hank Thompson; 17 Ozzie Virgil; 15,45 Bill White	Outfielders: 25 Jackie Brandt; 30,36 Bob Lennon; 25 Whitey Lockman; 24 Willie Mays; 22 Don Mueller; 26 Dusty Rhodes; 27 Bill Taylor; 29 George Wilson; Other batters: 28 Gil Coan	Manager: 18 Bill Rigney; Coaches: 2 Ray Mueller; 3 Bucky Walters; 1 Davey Williams

== Player stats ==
=== Batting ===
==== Starters by position ====
Note: Pos = Position; G = Games played; AB = At bats; H = Hits; Avg. = Batting average; HR = Home runs; RBI = Runs batted in

Pos	Player	G	AB	H	Avg.	HR	RBI
C	Bill Sarni	78	238	55	.231	5	23
1B	Bill White	138	508	130	.256	22	59
2B	Red Schoendienst	92	334	99	.296	2	14
SS	Daryl Spencer	146	489	108	.221	14	42
3B	Foster Castleman	124	385	87	.226	14	45
LF	Jackie Brandt	98	351	105	.299	11	47
CF	Willie Mays	152	578	171	.296	36	84
RF	Don Mueller	138	453	122	.269	5	41

==== Other batters ====
Note: G = Games played; AB = At bats; H = Hits; Avg. = Batting average; HR = Home runs; RBI = Runs batted in

Player	G	AB	H	Avg.	HR	RBI
Dusty Rhodes	111	244	53	.217	8	33
Alvin Dark	48	206	52	.252	2	17
Hank Thompson	83	183	43	.235	8	29
Whitey Lockman	48	169	46	.272	1	10
Ed Bressoud	49	163	37	.227	0	9
Wes Westrum	68	132	29	.220	3	8
Ray Katt	37	101	23	.228	7	14
George Wilson	53	68	9	.132	1	2
Bobby Hofman	47	56	10	.179	0	2
Bob Lennon	26	55	10	.182	0	1
Gail Harris	12	38	5	.132	1	1
Jim Mangan	20	20	2	.100	0	1
Wayne Terwilliger	14	18	4	.222	0	0
Ozzie Virgil	3	12	5	.417	0	2
Bill Taylor	1	4	1	.250	0	0
Gil Coan	4	1	0	.000	0	0

=== Pitching ===
==== Starting pitchers ====
Note: G = Games pitched; IP = Innings pitched; W = Wins; L = Losses; ERA = Earned run average; SO = Strikeouts

Player	G	IP	W	L	ERA	SO
Johnny Antonelli	41	258.2	20	13	2.86	145
Rubén Gómez	40	196.1	7	17	4.58	76
Al Worthington	28	165.2	7	14	3.97	95
Roy Wright	1	2.2	0	1	16.88	0

==== Other pitchers ====
Note: G = Games pitched; IP = Innings pitched; W = Wins; L = Losses; ERA = Earned run average; SO = Strikeouts

Player	G	IP	W	L	ERA	SO
Jim Hearn	30	129.1	5	11	3.97	66
Dick Littlefield	31	97.0	4	4	4.08	65
Joe Margoneri	23	91.2	6	6	3.93	49
Don Liddle	11	41.1	1	2	3.92	21
Max Surkont	8	32.0	2	2	4.78	18
Ramón Monzant	4	13.0	1	0	4.15	11
Mike McCormick	3	6.2	0	1	9.48	4

==== Relief pitchers ====
Note: G = Games pitched; W = Wins; L = Losses; SV = Saves; ERA = Earned run average; SO = Strikeouts

Player	G	W	L	SV	ERA	SO
Hoyt Wilhelm	64	4	9	8	3.83	71
Windy McCall	46	3	4	7	3.61	41
Marv Grissom	43	1	1	7	1.56	49
Steve Ridzik	41	6	2	0	3.80	53
Jim Constable	3	0	0	0	14.54	1

== Farm system ==
Level	Team	League	Manager
AAA	Minneapolis Millers	American Association	Eddie Stanky
AA	Dallas Eagles	Texas League	Red Davis
A	Johnstown Johnnies	Eastern League	Andy Gilbert and Frank Genovese
A	Albuquerque Dukes	Western League	Bob Swift
B	Danville Leafs	Carolina League	Salty Parker
C	Lake Charles Giants	Evangeline League	Mike McCormick
C	St. Cloud Rox	Northern League	Charlie Fox
D	Cocoa Indians	Florida State League	Buddy Kerr
D	Sandersville Giants	Georgia State League	Pete Pavlick
D	Michigan City White Caps	Midwest League	Al Shinn
D	Hastings Giants	Nebraska State League	Junior Thompson
D	Muskogee Giants	Sooner State League	Richie Klaus

LEAGUE CHAMPIONS: Cocoa
