= Hy Cohen =

American baseball player (1931–2021)

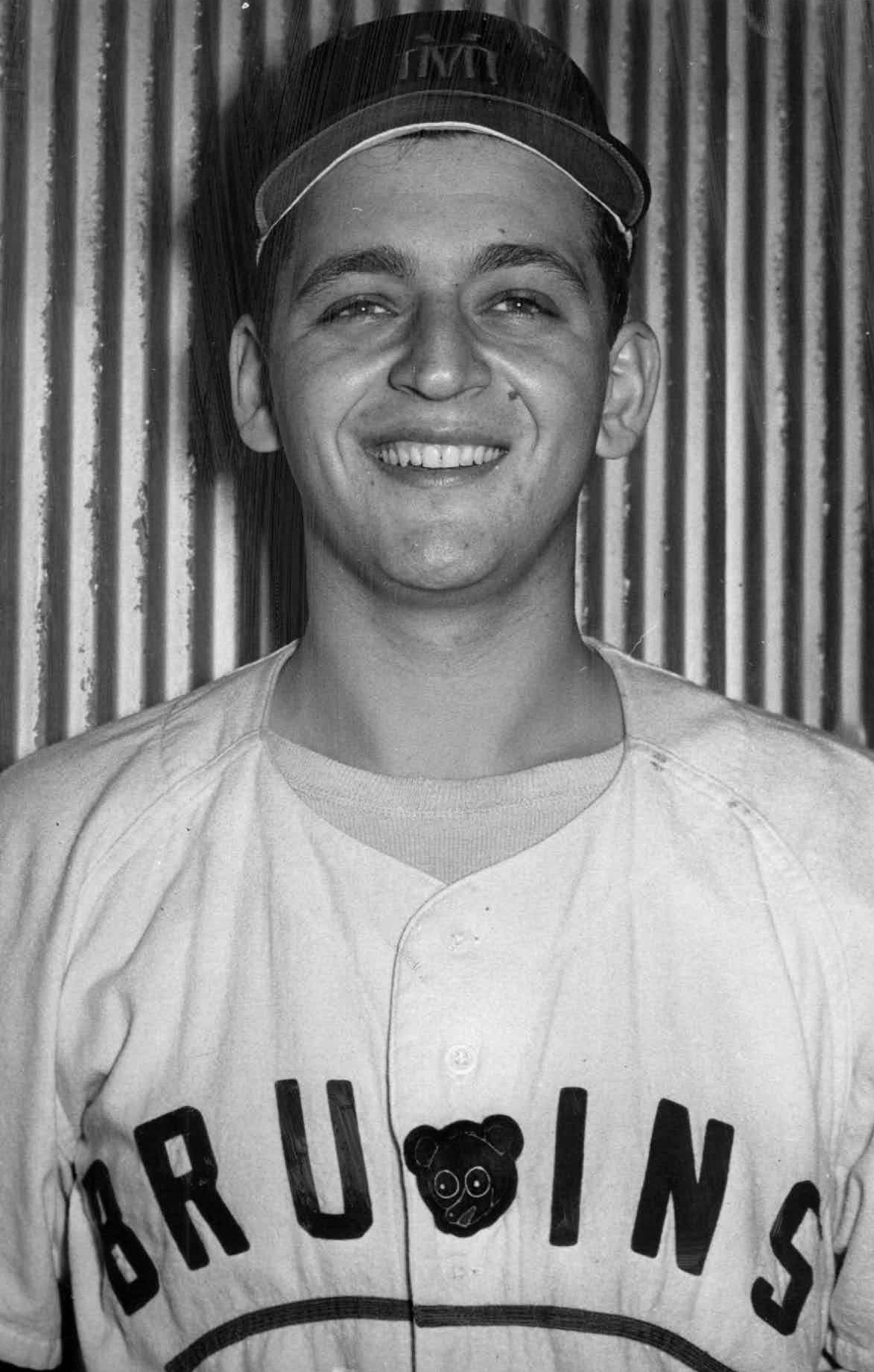
- Cohen with the Des Moines Bruins in 1954
- Pitcher
- Born: January 29, 1931; Brooklyn, New York, U.S
- Died: February 4, 2021 (aged 90); Rancho Mirage, California, U.S.
- Batted: Right Threw: Right

MLB debut
- April 17, 1955, for the Chicago Cubs

Last MLB appearance
- June 2, 1955, for the Chicago Cubs

MLB statistics
- Win–loss record: 0–0
- Earned run average: 7.94
- Innings pitched: 17
- Stats at Baseball Reference

Teams
- Chicago Cubs (1955)

Hyman Cohen (January 29, 1931 – February 4, 2021) was an American baseball pitcher who played seven games for the Chicago Cubs in one season of Major League Baseball (MLB) in 1955. He batted and threw right-handed and served as a relief pitcher.

Cohen was signed as an amateur free agent by the New York Yankees in 1948 and played for one of their minor league affiliates until 1949, when the Chicago Cubs drafted him in that year's minor league draft. After spending two seasons with the organization, he was drafted into the US Army. As a result, he missed the 1952 and 1953 seasons. Upon his return, he pitched in the minors until 1955, when the Cubs promoted him to the major leagues. He played his last game on June 2, 1955. He subsequently worked as a teacher and coach at Birmingham High School.

== Early life ==
Cohen was born in Brooklyn on January 29, 1931. His family was Jewish and both of his parents were Polish immigrants. His father, Joseph, immigrated from Warsaw, while his mother, Bessie, was originally from Brest-Litovsk. One of his childhood idols was Harry Danning, the catcher for the New York Giants of Major League Baseball (MLB). Cohen attended Thomas Jefferson High School before studying at Brooklyn College. He was signed as an amateur free agent by the New York Yankees before the 1948 season.

== Professional career ==
=== Minor leagues ===
Cohen began his professional baseball career with the La Grange Troupers, in the Georgia–Alabama League. During his first year with the team, he finished with a 7–5 win–loss record and a 5.50 earned run average (ERA) in 72 innings pitched. In his second season, he had a 11–15 record, a 3.33 ERA, and 148 strikeouts over 192 innings. His unremarkable performance reportedly led the Yankees to overlook the renewal of his contract. He was subsequently selected by the Chicago Cubs in the minor league draft at the end of 1949.

In his only season with the Grand Rapids Jets (the Cubs' Class-A affiliate in the Central League), Cohen compiled a 12–9 win–loss record and a 3.41 ERA in 206 innings. This earned him a promotion to the Des Moines Bruins of the Class-A Western League in the following year. He finished the 1951 season with a 16–10 record and a 2.86 ERA across 236 innings pitched, along with three wins in the playoffs. He considered this to be the best season in his professional baseball career. He was later chosen in the Selective Service draft and joined the US Army to fight in the Korean War, and did not play professional baseball from 1952 to 1953. He was stationed in San Antonio and played baseball there with future major leaguers such as Bobby Brown, Don Newcombe, Gus Triandos, Bob Turley, Joe Margoneri, Dick Kokos, Owen Friend, and Marv Rotblatt.

Upon his return from military service, Cohen was placed with the Los Angeles Angels of the Pacific Coast League. He pitched poorly during his nine-game stint with the team, posting a 6.60 ERA and 6 strikeouts in just 15 innings pitched. He rebounded after being promptly sent back to the Bruins. His 1.88 ERA led the Western League, and he finished second with a 1.051 walks plus hits per inning pitched (WHIP) and seventh in wins (16).

=== Chicago Cubs ===
Cohen made his MLB debut on April 17, 1955, relieving Harry Perkowski and giving up seven earned runs and striking out two over seven innings in a 14–1 loss to the St. Louis Cardinals. His best performance came during his second game on April 27, in which he held the Pittsburgh Pirates to one hit and one walk across three scoreless innings. He played five more games for the Cubs. During his only career start in the first game of a doubleheader against the Philadelphia Phillies on May 1, he surrendered five earned runs across three innings pitched. Cohen played his final major league game on June 2, 1955, at the age of 24. Topps had initially approached him for input on the baseball card of him that they were intending to produce. However, his time in the major leagues ended before the card could be made.

=== Return to minor leagues ===
Cohen went back to the minor leagues and compiled a 5–10 record, a 3.59 ERA, and 40 strikeouts in 100 1/3 innings pitched during his second stint with the Angels in 1955. He also recorded 4 complete games and 2 shutouts. During the 1956 season, he pitched for three teams—the Angels, Tulsa Oilers, and New Orleans Pelicans—posting a combined 16–8 record. He was assigned to the Memphis Chicks in 1957, and had the fourth-lowest ERA (2.72), the fifth-best WHIP (1.163), and the sixth most wins (15) in the Southern Association that season. He was selected by the Detroit Tigers in the minor league draft at the end of that same year. He played the first part of the 1958 season with the Nashville Volunteers, where he had a 2–6 win–loss record, a 8.51 ERA, and 8 strikeouts over 37 innings. His contract was subsequently purchased by the Toronto Maple Leafs for $50,000. Jack Kent Cooke, the owner of the Leafs, wanted to sign a Jewish player to drum up support for the team from the city's sizable Jewish population. Cohen ultimately pitched only five games for the club before discomfort in his arm caused him to retire from professional baseball in 1958.

== Later life ==
After retiring from baseball, Cohen went back to school at California State University, Los Angeles, and obtained a Master of Education in 1966. He proceeded to teach social studies and physical education at Birmingham High School in Los Angeles. He also coached the school's football, tennis, and baseball teams into the 1980s. The baseball team won two city championships during his time there, in 1966 and 1969. Cohen was recognized at Dodger Stadium in 1995 for his important contributions to baseball education. One year later, he was inducted into the Southern California Jewish Sports Hall of Fame.

Cohen was married to Terry Cohen until his death. Together, they had two children: Jeff and Jill.

He died on February 4, 2021, at the Eisenhower Medical Center in Rancho Mirage, California. He was 90, and had contracted COVID-19 several months before his death. He continued to suffer health issues from the virus after his supposed recovery.
