= Jim Mangan =

American baseball player (1929–2007)

- Catcher
- Born: September 24, 1929; San Francisco, California, U.S.
- Died: July 19, 2007 (aged 77); San Jose, California, U.S.
- Batted: Right Threw: Right

MLB debut
- April 16, 1952, for the Pittsburgh Pirates

Last MLB appearance
- August 4, 1956, for the New York Giants

MLB statistics
- Batting average: .153
- Home runs: 0
- Runs batted in: 5
- Stats at Baseball Reference

Teams
- Pittsburgh Pirates (1952, 1954); New York Giants (1956)

James Daniel Mangan (September 24, 1929 – July 19, 2007) was an American professional baseball player. He was a backup catcher in Major League Baseball who played for the Pittsburgh Pirates and New York Giants between 1952 and 1956. Listed at 5 feet 10 inches (1.78 m) and 190 pounds (86 kg), Mangan batted and threw right-handed. He was born in San Francisco, attended St. Ignatius College Preparatory and the University of Santa Clara, and graduated from the University of San Francisco.

Mangan was signed by Pittsburgh in 1949 and played briefly for the Pirates in 1952 and 1954, before joining the Giants in 1956, spending May through August on the Giants' roster and getting into an MLB-career-high 20 games played.

In a three-season MLB career, Mangan was a .153 hitter (nine-for-59) with five runs and five RBI without home runs in 45 total games. He also had an eight-season (1949–1951; 1954–1955; 1957–1958) career in minor league baseball.

Following his baseball career, Mangan became a high school teacher and small business owner. He died in San Jose, California, at the age of 77.

== Sources ==
- Baseball Reference
- Retrosheet
- San Francisco Chronicle obituary
