= Chris Kitsos =

American baseball player (1928–2004)

- Shortstop
- Born: February 11, 1928; New York City, New York, U.S.
- Died: June 7, 2004 (aged 76); Mobile, Alabama, U.S.
- Batted: Switch Threw: Right

MLB debut
- April 21, 1954, for the Chicago Cubs

Last MLB appearance
- April 21, 1954, for the Chicago Cubs

MLB statistics
- Games played: 1
- At bats: 0
- Errors: 0
- Stats at Baseball Reference

Teams
- Chicago Cubs (1954)

Christopher Anestos Kitsos (February 11, 1928 – June 7, 2004) was an American professional baseball player. Although he appeared in only one inning of one Major League Baseball game (for the 1954 Chicago Cubs), Kitsos had a 13-year (1947–1959) career in the minor leagues, playing in 1,618 games, primarily as a shortstop. He was a switch hitter who threw right-handed, and was listed at 5 ft 9 in (1.75 m) tall and 165 lb (75 kg).

Kitsos' MLB appearance came on April 21, 1954 against the Milwaukee Braves at County Stadium. He played shortstop (spelling Eddie Miksis, who pinch hit for starter Ernie Banks, in his first full MLB season) in the bottom of the eighth inning with the Cubs trailing 7–3. He retired two of three Brave batters that inning (Johnny Logan and Warren Spahn) on ground ball outs as Cub pitcher Jim Davis got the side in order. However, the Cubs also were retired in order in the top of the ninth, denying Kitsos a Major League plate appearance. He spent the rest of the 1954 season, and his career, in the minor leagues.

Kitsos died from lung cancer in Mobile, Alabama in 2004 at the age of 76.
