= Tom Acker =

American baseball player (1930–2021)

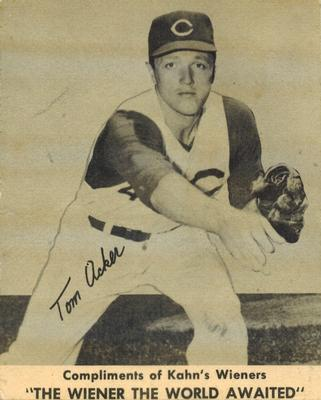
- Pitcher
- Born: March 7, 1930; Paterson, New Jersey, U.S.
- Died: January 4, 2021 (aged 90); Narvon, Pennsylvania, U.S.
- Batted: Right Threw: Right

MLB debut
- April 20, 1956, for the Cincinnati Redlegs

Last MLB appearance
- September 20, 1959, for the Cincinnati Redlegs

MLB statistics
- Win–loss record: 19–13
- Earned run average: 4.12
- Strikeouts: 256
- Stats at Baseball Reference

Teams
- Cincinnati Redlegs / Reds (1956–1959)

Thomas James Acker (March 7, 1930 – January 4, 2021) was an American professional baseball player. He was a pitcher for the Cincinnati Reds in four seasons of Major League Baseball (MLB) from 1956 to 1959. He batted and threw right-handed and served primarily as a relief pitcher.

Acker was signed as an amateur free agent by the New York Giants in 1948 and played for two of their minor league affiliates until 1950, when the Buffalo Bisons drafted him in that year's minor league draft. After spending one season with the organization, he was traded to the Cincinnati Reds in October 1951, the same month he drafted into the US Army. As a result, he missed the 1952 and 1953 seasons. Upon his return from the army, he pitched in the minors until 1956, when the Redlegs promoted him to the major leagues. He played his last game on September 20, 1959, and subsequently worked at the Meadowlands Racetrack from its opening in 1976 until 1992.

== Early life ==
Acker was born in Paterson, New Jersey, on March 7, 1930. His father, Tom Sr., worked as a police officer in Fair Lawn, New Jersey. Acker grew up in that city and attended Fair Lawn High School. There, he pitched for the school team that won its league and state championships from 1946 to 1948. In his senior year, he compiled a 9–0 win–loss record and 102 strikeouts in 63 innings pitched. He was signed as an amateur free agent by the New York Giants before the 1948 season.

== Professional career ==
=== Minor leagues ===
Acker began his professional baseball career with the Oshkosh Giants, a minor league baseball team that were members of the Wisconsin State League. During his first year with the team, he finished with a 3–6 win–loss record and a 5.06 earned run average (ERA) in 80 innings pitched. His performance improved in his second season, with a 14–7 record, a 3.18 ERA, and 213 strikeouts over 201 innings, helping the Giants secure the pennant. This earned him a promotion to the Knoxville Smokies of the Class-B Tri-State League in the following year. Although Acker finished the 1950 season with fewer wins (6), he managed to lower his ERA to 3.07 across 132 innings pitched. The Smokies won the pennant, and he was subsequently selected by the Buffalo Bisons in the minor league draft at the end of the year.

In his only season with the Bisons, Acker compiled a 10–13 win–loss record, a 3.69 ERA, and 111 strikeouts in 29 starts. He also recorded 11 complete games and 2 shutouts that year. He was traded to the Cincinnati Reds along with Moe Savransky on October 14, 1951, for Jim Bolger. Later that same month, he was chosen in the Selective Service draft and joined the US Army as a private. Consequently, Acker did not play professional baseball from 1952 to 1953. While stationed at Camp Breckinridge in Morganfield, Kentucky, he played baseball for the Richmond Mercurys. Upon his return from military service, he was placed with the Class-AA Tulsa Oilers. There, he finished with a 7–8 record, a 5.08 ERA, and 102 strikeouts over 15 starts. He rebounded in 1955 with the Nashville Volunteers, where he improved his win–loss record (11–8) and ERA (3.26), and made 10 additional starts compared to the previous season.

=== Cincinnati Reds (1956–1959) ===
Acker made his MLB debut on April 20, 1956, at the age of 26, relieving Hal Jeffcoat and giving up one earned run and striking out three (including Gene Baker, Acker's first batter faced) over 2 innings in a 12–1 loss to the Chicago Cubs. Overall, he finished his first season in the major leagues with a 4–3 record and a 2.37 ERA in 83 2/3 innings pitched. He started 7 of the 29 games in which he pitched, and recorded the only shutout of his major league career against the Philadelphia Phillies on September 19.

Acker's 1957 season was one of his best individual years. (Note: Although Christianson and Diepeveen describe Acker's 1957 season as "[h]is best year" without qualification, Acker recorded more pitching Wins Above Replacement in 1956 (2.9) than in 1957 (0.4).) He finished ninth in the National League (NL) in games pitched (49) and second in hit batsmen (8). If he had the requisite number of decisions to qualify, his .667 winning percentage that year would rank third in the NL. He compiled a 10–5 record, a 4.97 ERA, and 67 strikeouts in 108 2/3 innings pitched, making six starts and saving four games that season. He won both games of a doubleheader against the Pittsburgh Pirates on May 19.

In the 1958 season, Acker recorded career-high numbers in strikeouts (90), games started (10), complete games (3), home runs per nine innings (0.7), and innings pitched (124 2/3). He ended the season with a 4–3 record and a 4.55 ERA. Although the latter number was high, his 3.18 FIP suggests he was a more effective pitcher than his statistics that year would indicate. Acker played his final major league game on September 20, 1959, at the age of 29. He finished his final season with a 4.12 ERA and 45 strikeouts in 63 1/3 innings pitched. He was subsequently traded to the Kansas City Athletics for Frank House on November 21 that same year. The Athletics assigned him to the Richmond Virginians, where he briefly played in 1960. He was unconditionally released after he declined a move to the Dallas Rangers of the American Association, given his reluctance to displace his family across the country.

== Post-playing career ==
After retiring from baseball, Acker returned home to Bergen County, New Jersey, constructed a house in Wyckoff, and was employed by a trucking company. He continued to play baseball at a semi-professional level, first with the Paterson Phillies. He went on to spend seven years with the newly formed Emerson-Westwood Merchants as a pitcher and manager. His participation is credited with helping to revive interest in small-town baseball.

Aside from baseball, Acker had a keen interest in horses. He started working for the New Jersey Sports and Exposition Authority at the Meadowlands Racetrack shortly after the facility opened in 1976, first as a mutuel clerk, then as a supervisor. He retired from the position in 1992, and relocated to Virginia before finally settling in Pennsylvania. He was inducted into the Fair Lawn Athletics Hall of Fame in 2006.

== Personal life ==
Acker married his first wife, Trudy, during his stint in the military. Together, they had two daughters: Nancy and Janice. He also had three stepsons from his subsequent marriage to Barbara. They remained married until his death. Acker died at the age of 90 on January 4, 2021, at his home in Narvon, Pennsylvania.
