= 1952 Major League Baseball All-Star Game =

1952 American baseball competition

	1	2	3	4	5	6	7	8	9	R	H	E
American League	0	0	0	2	0	X	X	X	X	2	5	0
National League	1	0	0	2	0	X	X	X	X	3	3	0
- Date: July 8, 1952
- Venue: Shibe Park
- City: Philadelphia, Pennsylvania
- Managers: Casey Stengel (New York Yankees); Leo Durocher (New York Giants)
- Attendance: 32,785
- Television: NBC
- TV announcers: Jack Brickhouse and Mel Allen
- Radio: Mutual
- Radio announcers: Al Helfer and Gene Kelly

The 1952 Major League Baseball All-Star Game was the 19th playing of the midsummer classic between the all-stars of the American League (AL) and National League (NL), the two leagues comprising Major League Baseball. The game was held on July 8, 1952, at Shibe Park in Philadelphia, Pennsylvania, the home of both the Philadelphia Phillies of the National League (who were the designated host team) and the Philadelphia Athletics of the American League. The game resulted in the National League defeating the American League 3–2 in 5 innings. It was the first All-Star Game—and to date, the only—to be called early due to rain.

Mickey Mantle was selected an All-Star for the first time, as was pitcher Satchel Paige, who a day before the game turned 46 years old. Neither appeared in the game.

== Synopsis ==
Jackie Robinson's first-inning home run off American League starting pitcher Vic Raschi to deep left field gave the National League a 1-0 lead.

In the top of the fourth inning, Minnie Miñoso doubled, Al Rosen drew a walk and Eddie Robinson singled in the AL's first run. Next batter Bobby Ávila's infield single made it 2-1.

Before the rain came, the NL struck back with a Hank Sauer homer off Bob Lemon in the bottom of the fourth, with what turned out to be the game-winning runs.

== Rosters ==
Players in italics have since been inducted into the National Baseball Hall of Fame.

=== American League ===
Starters
Position	Player	Team	All-Star Games
P	Vic Raschi	Yankees	4
C	Yogi Berra	Yankees	5
1B	Eddie Robinson	White Sox	3
2B	Bobby Ávila	Indians	2
3B	Al Rosen	Indians	1
SS	Phil Rizzuto	Yankees	4
OF	Hank Bauer	Yankees	1
OF	Dom DiMaggio	Red Sox	7
OF	Dale Mitchell	Indians	2

Pitchers
Position	Player	Team	All-Star Games
P	Mike Garcia	Indians	1
P	Bob Lemon	Indians	5
P	Satchel Paige	Browns	1
P	Allie Reynolds	Yankees	3
P	Bobby Shantz	Athletics	2

Reserves
Position	Player	Team	All-Star Games
C	Jim Hegan	Indians	5
1B	Ferris Fain	Athletics	3
2B	Nellie Fox	White Sox	2
2B	Gil McDougald	Yankees	1
3B	George Kell	Red Sox	6
3B	Eddie Yost	Senators	1
SS	Eddie Joost	Athletics	2
OF	Larry Doby	Indians	4
OF	Jackie Jensen	Senators	1
OF	Mickey Mantle	Yankees	1
OF	Minnie Miñoso	White Sox	2
OF	Vic Wertz	Tigers	3

=== National League ===
Starters
Position	Player	Team	All-Star Games
P	Curt Simmons	Phillies	1
C	Roy Campanella	Dodgers	4
1B	Whitey Lockman	Giants	1
2B	Jackie Robinson	Dodgers	4
3B	Bobby Thomson	Giants	3
SS	Granny Hamner	Phillies	1
OF	Stan Musial	Cardinals	9
OF	Hank Sauer	Cubs	2
OF	Enos Slaughter	Cardinals	9

Pitchers
Position	Player	Team	All-Star Games
P	Jim Hearn	Giants	1
P	Sal Maglie	Giants	2
P	Robin Roberts	Phillies	3
P	Preacher Roe	Dodgers	4
P	Bob Rush	Cubs	2
P	Warren Spahn	Braves	5
P	Gerry Staley	Cardinals	1

Reserves
Position	Player	Team	All-Star Games
C	Toby Atwell	Cubs	1
C	Wes Westrum	Giants	1
1B	Gil Hodges	Dodgers	4
2B	Red Schoendienst	Cardinals	6
3B	Grady Hatton	Reds	1
SS	Alvin Dark	Giants	2
SS	Pee Wee Reese	Dodgers	8
OF	Carl Furillo	Dodgers	1
OF	Monte Irvin	Giants	1
OF	Ralph Kiner	Pirates	5
OF	Duke Snider	Dodgers	3

== Game ==
=== Umpires ===
Al Barlick (NL)(home), Charlie Berry (AL) (first base), Dusty Boggess (NL)(second base), Bill Summers (AL)(third base), Lon Warneke (NL)(left field), Hank Soar (AL) (right field)

=== Starting lineups ===
American League				National League			
Order	Player	Team	Position	Order	Player	Team	Position
1	Dom DiMaggio	Red Sox	OF	1	Whitey Lockman	Giants	1B
2	Hank Bauer	Yankees	OF	2	Jackie Robinson	Dodgers	2B
3	Dale Mitchell	Indians	OF	3	Stan Musial	Cardinals	OF
4	Al Rosen	Indians	3B	4	Hank Sauer	Cubs	OF
5	Yogi Berra	Yankees	C	5	Roy Campanella	Dodgers	C
6	Eddie Robinson	White Sox	1B	6	Enos Slaughter	Cardinals	OF
7	Bobby Ávila	Indians	2B	7	Bobby Thomson	Giants	3B
8	Phil Rizzuto	Yankees	SS	8	Granny Hamner	Phillies	SS
9	Vic Raschi	Yankees	P	9	Curt Simmons	Phillies	P

=== Linescore ===
Tuesday, July 8, 1952 1:30 pm (ET) at Shibe Park in Philadelphia, Pennsylvania
Team	1	2	3	4	5	6	7	8	9	R	H	E
American League	0	0	0	2	0	x	x	x	x	2	5	0
National League	1	0	0	2	0	x	x	x	x	3	3	0
WP: Bob Rush (1–0) LP: Bob Lemon (0–1); Home runs: AL: None; NL: Jackie Robinson (1), Hank Sauer (1)

== Legacy ==
The 1952 game had been the first to All-Star Game to be called before the regulation nine innings. Twenty years later, the Phillies presented its Old-Timers Game as a "completion of the 1952 All-Star Game". The Phillies' Simmons had started for the National League, and the Philadelphia Athletics' Shantz had relived for the American League. On August 19, 1972, prior to the Phillies' regular game with the Houston Astros, the Old-Timers began in the "sixth inning" with the Veterans Stadium scoreboard showing the National League ahead 3-2 after five innings. Sauer, Bobby Thomson, Country Slaughter, Pee Wee Reese, Gran Hamner, and Robin Roberts all played for the National League Old-Timers. Shantz pitched the first inning of the Old-Timers Game which appeared as the sixth inning on the scoreboard. Shantz yielded five runs, while the American League Old-Timers scored only a run to "complete" the game with a score of 8-3.
