= Richie Myers =

American baseball player (1930–2011)

- Pinch runner/Pinch hitter
- Born: April 7, 1930; Sacramento, California, U.S.
- Died: June 24, 2011 (aged 81); Yreka, California, U.S.
- Batted: Right Threw: Right

MLB debut
- April 21, 1956, for the Chicago Cubs

Last MLB appearance
- May 2, 1956, for the Chicago Cubs

MLB statistics
- Games played: 4
- At bats: 1
- Hits: 0
- Runs scored: 0
- Stats at Baseball Reference

Teams
- Chicago Cubs (1956)

Richard Myers (April 7, 1930 – June 24, 2011) was an American Major League Baseball player. Listed at 5' 6", 150 lb., Myers batted and threw right-handed. He was born in Sacramento, California.

Myers had a nine-year minor league career as a shortstop before joining the Chicago Cubs during the 1956 season, appearing in four games as a pinch runner and pinch hitter.

In his only MLB at-bat on April 29, 1956, against the Cincinnati Redlegs at Crosley Field, Myers pinch hit for Cub pitcher Vito Valentinetti and grounded out to shortstop Roy McMillan against Cincinnati starting pitcher Art Fowler. As a pinch runner, he appeared in three other games but failed to score a run.

His 1948–1956 minor league career largely took place with his hometown Sacramento Solons of the Pacific Coast League, where he spent all or part of seven of his nine professional seasons. Myers posted a .261 batting average with 45 home runs in 937 games and a .964 fielding percentage at shortstop.

Following his retirement, Myers worked for the city of Sacramento as a street maintenance supervisor. In 2006 Myers moved to Yreka, California, where he died at the age of 81 following complications from a fall.
