= Bill Sarni =

American baseball player (1927–1983)

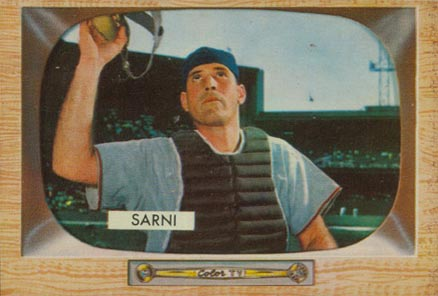
- Catcher
- Born: September 19, 1927; Los Angeles, California, U.S.
- Died: April 15, 1983 (aged 55); Creve Coeur, Missouri, U.S.
- Batted: Right Threw: Right

MLB debut
- May 9, 1951, for the St. Louis Cardinals

Last MLB appearance
- September 18, 1956, for the New York Giants

MLB statistics
- Batting average: .263
- Home runs: 22
- Run batted in: 151
- Stats at Baseball Reference

Teams
- St. Louis Cardinals (1951–1952, 1954–1956); New York Giants (1956)

William Florine Sarni (September 19, 1927 – April 15, 1983) was an American professional baseball player who played as a catcher in the Major Leagues. A native of Los Angeles, he played for the St. Louis Cardinals (1951–1952, 1954–1956) and New York Giants (1956).

== Baseball career ==
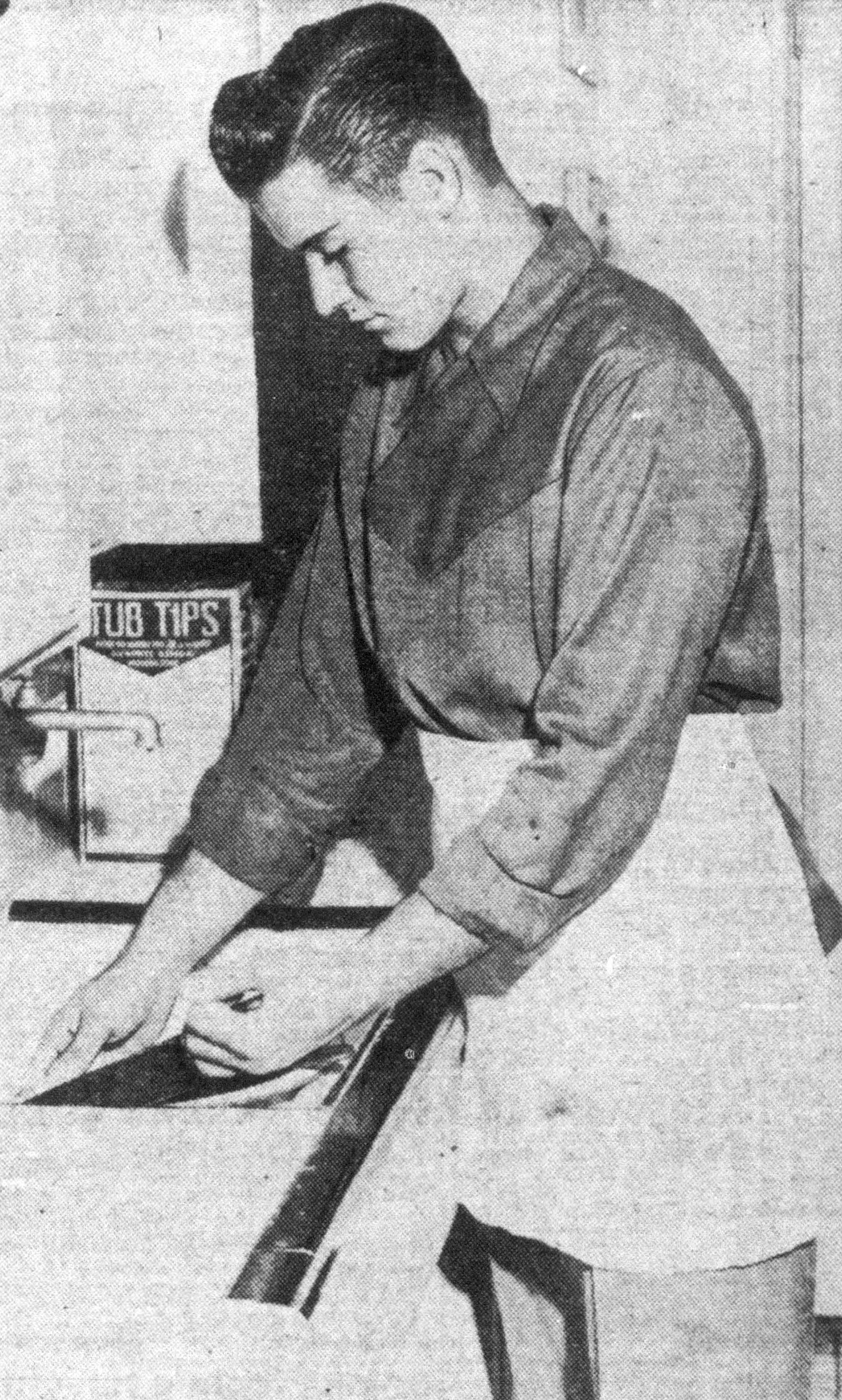
Sarini, circa 1943

Sarni attended Los Angeles High School; he threw and batted right-handed, stood 5 feet 11 inches (1.80 m) tall and weighed 180 pounds (82 kg). His professional baseball career began in 1943 at the age of 15 when he played for the Los Angeles Angels of the Pacific Coast League. In 33 games he went 19-for-83 (.229) with one home run and nine runs batted in. Sarni led Texas League catchers with a .991 fielding percentage while playing for the Shreveport Sports in 1948. He led American Association catchers with 597 putouts and a .989 fielding percentage while playing for the Columbus Red Birds in 1950.

Sarni made his major league debut with the Cardinals on May 11, 1951 at the age of 23. After hitting for only a .174 average during his rookie year, Sarni was sent back to the Columbus Red Birds in May 1952 in order to trim their roster down to the 25 player limit. He posted a .277 batting average along with 8 home runs and 60 runs batted in during the 1953 season with Columbus and, earned a spot on the American Association All-Star team. In October 1953, the Cardinals purchased Sarni from Columbus.

Sarni became the Cardinals starting catcher when Del Rice was injured during a play at home plate on June 7, 1954. In 123 games he posted a .300 batting average with 9 home runs and 70 runs batted in. He also led National League catchers with a .996 fielding percentage and 12 double plays. One odd footnote from the 1954 season was a game in St. Louis on July 18 against the Philadelphia Phillies in which, both Sarni and Phillies catcher Stan Lopata played the game without wearing chest protectors because of the intense heat.

The Cardinals traded Rice to the Milwaukee Braves in June 1955 and, Sarni became their number one catcher. Although his batting average dipped to .255 in 1955, he was hitting above .300 in early June 1956 when, the Cardinals traded him to the New York Giants along with Jackie Brandt, Dick Littlefield and Red Schoendienst for Alvin Dark, Ray Katt, Don Liddle and Whitey Lockman.

Sarni took over as the Giants starting catcher and ended the year leading the league's catchers with 61 assists and 10 double plays. During spring training in 1957 he suffered a heart attack that ended his playing career. He was just 29 years old. The Giants kept him on by creating a coaching position for him. In 1958 he signed a contract to coach for the Rochester Red Wings in the St. Louis Cardinals organisation, then resigned after one season to take up a career selling stocks and bonds for an investment firm.

== Career statistics ==
In a 5-year major league career, Sarni played in 390 games, accumulating 311 hits in 1,182 at bats for a .263 career batting average along with 22 home runs, 151 runs batted in and an on-base percentage of .313. His lifetime fielding percentage was .991.

Sarni died at the age of 55 in Creve Coeur, Missouri.
