= Corky Valentine =

American baseball player (1929-2005)

- Pitcher
- Born: January 4, 1929; Troy, Ohio, U.S.
- Died: January 21, 2005 (aged 76); Roswell, Georgia, U.S.
- Batted: Right Threw: Right

MLB debut
- April 17, 1954, for the Cincinnati Redlegs

Last MLB appearance
- May 29, 1955, for the Cincinnati Redlegs

MLB statistics
- Win–loss record: 14–12
- Earned run average: 4.81
- Strikeouts: 87
- Stats at Baseball Reference

Teams
- Cincinnati Redlegs (1954–1955)

Harold Lewis "Corky" Valentine (January 4, 1929 – January 21, 2005) was an American professional baseball pitcher who worked in 46 career games in Major League Baseball as a member of the 1954 and 1955 Cincinnati Redlegs. Born in Troy, Ohio, Valentine threw and batted right-handed and was listed as 6 feet 1 inch (1.85 m) tall and 203 pounds (92 kg).

== Career ==
Valentine entered professional baseball in 1948 in the Cincinnati farm system. After spending three years in the low minor leagues, and missing 1951 and 1952, he led the 1953 Sally League in earned run average (2.11) and helped the Columbia Reds win the league championship. The following year, he made the parent Redlegs' regular-season roster. Taking a turn in Cincinnati's starting rotation, he appeared in 36 games as a rookie, with 28 starts. His 12 victories put him in a three-way tie (with Joe Nuxhall and Art Fowler) for most on the Redleg staff, and he paced all Cincinnati pitchers with three shutouts; he also threw seven complete games, second-most on the club. However, plagued by arm miseries, Valentine was demoted to the Redlegs' Triple-A Havana Sugar Kings affiliate after May 29, 1955.

He never returned to the major leagues. In May 1956, Cincinnati traded him to the Milwaukee Braves, who assigned Valentine to their Double-A club, the Atlanta Crackers. He spent the rest of his career in the Braves' system, retiring in 1959 after ten pro seasons. Remaining in Atlanta, he entered law enforcement and community policing as member of the Atlanta Police Department, then the Fulton County Police Department, where he was commended for apprehending three armed robbery suspects. He retired from the force in 1992, and died in Roswell, Georgia, of congestive heart failure at age 76 on January 21, 2005.

In his 46 big-league games (including 33 starts), he posted a 14–12 won–lost record and a 4.81 career earned run average. In addition to his seven complete games and three shutouts, he was credited with one save among his 13 relief appearances. Valentine allowed 240 hits and 76 bases on balls, with 87 strikeouts, in 221 MLB innings pitched.
