= Vicente Amor =

Cuban baseball player (born 1932)

- Pitcher
- Born: August 8, 1932 (age 94); Havana, Cuba
- Batted: Right Threw: Right

MLB debut
- August 16, 1955, for the Chicago Cubs

Last MLB appearance
- August 26, 1957, for the Cincinnati Redlegs

MLB statistics
- Win–loss record: 1–3
- Earned run average: 5.67
- Strikeouts: 12
- Stats at Baseball Reference

Teams
- Chicago Cubs (1955); Cincinnati Redlegs (1957)

Vicente Amor Álvarez (born August 8, 1932) is a Cuban former professional baseball player and right-handed pitcher who played parts of two seasons in Major League Baseball (1955 for the Chicago Cubs and 1957 for the Cincinnati Redlegs). Born in Havana, he stood 6 feet 3 inches (1.91 m) tall and weighed 182 pounds (83 kg).

Amor's career lasted for ten seasons, 1950 through 1959. After he won 18 games in the Double-A Texas League in 1954, he was drafted by the Cubs from the Oakland Oaks of the Pacific Coast League in that offseason's Rule 5 Draft on November 22. His major-league tenure consisted of four games with the 1955 Cubs and nine appearances for the 1957 Redlegs.

In his 13 MLB games pitched, he made four starts, all for Cincinnati. In one of them, he threw a six-hit complete game victory over the New York Giants on August 4, 1957, at Crosley Field.

Over his big-league career, he permitted 50 hits and 13 bases on balls in 331/3 innings pitched, with a dozen strikeouts. He posted a 1–3 won–lost mark and an earned run average of 5.67.
