= Roy Wright (baseball) =

American baseball player

- Pitcher
- Born: September 26, 1933; Buchtel, Ohio, U.S.
- Died: May 5, 2018 (aged 84); Chickamauga, Georgia, U.S.
- Batted: Right Threw: Right

MLB debut
- September 30, 1956, for the New York Giants

Last MLB appearance
- September 30, 1956, for the New York Giants

MLB statistics
- Win–loss record: 0–1
- Earned run average: 16.88
- Innings pitched: 2 2/3
- Stats at Baseball Reference

Teams
- New York Giants (1956)

Roy Earl Wright (September 26, 1933 – May 5, 2018) was an American professional baseball player. A right-handed pitcher, during his playing career he was measured at 6 feet 2 inches (1.88 m) tall and weighed 170 pounds (77 kg).

Wright pitched one game of Major League Baseball. Signed by the New York Giants after four years of service in the United States Army, he started the last game of the Giants' 1956 season, the second game of a double-header against the Philadelphia Phillies. Wright lasted 2 2/3 innings, giving up eight hits (including a three-run home run by Willie "Puddin' Head" Jones), five earned runs and two bases on balls. He took the loss in a 5–2 Giant defeat.

Wright pitched in the minor leagues from 1957 to 1959 before leaving baseball.

Wright died May 5, 2018.
