= Moe Savransky =

American baseball player (1929–2022)

- Pitcher
- Born: January 13, 1929; Cleveland, Ohio, U.S.
- Died: October 13, 2022 (aged 93); Alpharetta, Georgia, U.S.
- Batted: Left Threw: Left

MLB debut
- April 23, 1954, for the Cincinnati Redlegs

Last MLB appearance
- September 5, 1954, for the Cincinnati Redlegs

MLB statistics
- Win–loss record: 0–2
- Earned run average: 4.88
- Innings pitched: 24
- Stats at Baseball Reference

Teams
- Cincinnati Redlegs (1954)

Morris Savransky (January 13, 1929 – October 13, 2022) was an American professional baseball player. A left-handed pitcher listed at 5 ft 11 in (1.80 m), 175 pounds (79 kg), he pitched in Major League Baseball for the Cincinnati Redlegs in 1954.

== Early and personal life ==
Savransky was born in Cleveland, Ohio, and was Jewish. His son Al became a baseball and wrestling coach at Pope High School in Marietta, Georgia.

== High school and college ==
Savransky attended Cleveland Heights High School ('48), where he pitched the school baseball team to the 1947 Ohio Class A high school baseball title after a regular season in which he was 10–0. He won two games in the finals on consecutive days. He attended Ohio State University in its College of Commerce on a basketball scholarship during the off-season. Savransky also played baseball for the university, competing in the 1951 College World Series.

== Minor leagues ==
Savransky was signed by the Cincinnati Redlegs in June 1948. He played in the minors from 1948 up until 1955 at various stops, missing the 1952 and 1953 seasons for military service. In 1950, pitching 245 innings combined for two minor league teams of Cincinnati, Savransky went 17–9 with a 1.98 ERA. In October 1950, he was purchased by the Buffalo Bisons (International League) from Cincinnati. On October 14, 1951, Savransky was traded by Buffalo with pitcher Tom Acker to Cincinnati for outfielder Jim Bolger.

== Major leagues and thereafter ==
Savransky made his Major League debut for the Redlegs at age 25 on April 23, 1954, when he came on in the top of the ninth inning in a 10–3 loss to the Chicago Cubs. He gave up one hit, but escaped without allowing a run. Savransky appeared in 16 games for the Redlegs during the 1954 season. In 24 innings he gave up 23 hits and 13 runs, with eight bases on balls and seven strikeouts. In three plate appearances, Savransky had a hit and a walk, and scored both times.

He retired at the end of the 1954 season. Thereafter, Savransky was in the oil business and also threw batting practice for a number of years at home games of the Cleveland Indians. Later, he was a steel company sales representative in Chicago, and a waste management company independent contractor in Los Angeles.

Savransky died on October 13, 2022, at age 93. At the time of his death, he was one of the 100 oldest living former Major League Baseball players.
