= Gail Harris (baseball) =

American baseball player (1931–2012)

- First baseman
- Born: October 15, 1931; Abingdon, Virginia, U.S.
- Died: November 14, 2012 (aged 81); Gainesville, Virginia, U.S.
- Batted: Left Threw: Left

MLB debut
- June 3, 1955, for the New York Giants

Last MLB appearance
- May 30, 1960, for the Detroit Tigers

MLB statistics
- Batting average: .240
- Home runs: 51
- Runs batted in: 190
- Stats at Baseball Reference

Teams
- New York Giants (1955–1957); Detroit Tigers (1958–1960)

Boyd Gail Harris Jr. (October 15, 1931 – November 14, 2012) was an American professional baseball first baseman who played for the New York Giants and Detroit Tigers of Major League Baseball (MLB) during all or part of six seasons between 1955 and 1960. In 1958, Harris hit a career high 20 home runs with the Tigers. Harris batted and threw left-handed and was listed as 6 feet (1.8 m) tall and 195 pounds (88 kg).

== Baseball career ==
=== Early life ===
Harris was born in Abingdon, Virginia, and was an athletic standout at now-defunct William King High School in Abingdon.

=== New York Giants ===
He signed with Giants at age 18 in 1950 and spent 51/2 seasons in their farm system before making his debut on June 3, 1955. With Whitey Lockman shifting to left field, Harris became the Giants' starting first baseman for the rest of the season. But he batted only .232 in 79 games played, and lost the 1956 starting job to future eight-time National League All-Star Bill White. Harris hit only .132 with the 1956 Giants and spent most of the season at Triple-A. In 1957, the Giants' last season in New York City, White entered the military and opened up a spot for Harris as the team's backup first baseman. On September 21, Harris hit the last homer by a New York Giants player, off Red Witt of the Pittsburgh Pirates at Forbes Field, part of a four-hit, seven-RBI day. He appeared as a pinch hitter in Giants' penultimate game at the Polo Grounds on September 28, fouling out in the eighth inning of a 1–0 defeat. For the season, Harris hit .240 with nine home runs in 90 games played. On January 28, 1958, he was traded by the relocated San Francisco Giants to the Detroit Tigers with third baseman Ozzie Virgil for third baseman Jim Finigan and cash.

=== Detroit Tigers ===
The trade set up Harris' best MLB season. He began 1958 in a backup role to right-handed swinging Ray Boone. But in mid-June, with Harris hitting over .300, Detroit swapped Boone to the Chicago White Sox and Harris became the Tigers' starting first baseman. Appearing in a career-high 134 games, starting 112 at first base, he established career bests in runs (63), hits (123), extra-base hits (46, including his 20 homers), runs batted in (82), and batting average (.278).

But he could not sustain that production in 1959. Mired in a horrible early-season slump (as were the Tigers, who lost 15 of their first 17 games), Harris was hitting as low as .149 on May 22. He didn't exceed the .200 mark until the last day of July before finishing the year at .221 with only nine home runs. The following year, Norm Cash became the Tigers' everyday first baseman. After only eight games with Detroit, Harris was traded to the Los Angeles Dodgers on May 7 for outfielder Sandy Amoros. He spent the rest of 1960 and all of 1961 at Triple-A before leaving pro baseball.

=== MLB career totals ===
In 437 career MLB games and 1,331 at bats, Harris hit .240 lifetime with 189 runs batted in. His 320 hits included 38 doubles, 15 triples and 51 home runs.

== Retirement ==
Following Harris' baseball career, he worked in insurance sales. He lived in Manassas, Virginia, and his son, Mark, played in the minors briefly and was a minor league instructor for the Kansas City Royals' organization. Mark Harris was the hitting coach for the Washington Nationals' Double-A affiliate, the Harrisburg Senators, and was hitting coach for the 2014 Futures Game.

Mark is currently the hitting coach for the Washington Nationals High-A affiliate, the Wilmington Blue Rocks.

== Death ==
Gail Harris died on November 14, 2012, in Gainesville, Virginia.
