= Ted Tappe =

American baseball player (1931–2004)

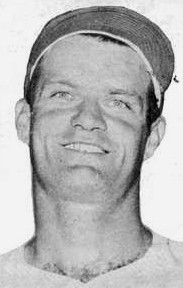
- Right fielder
- Born: February 2, 1931; Seattle, Washington, U.S.
- Died: February 13, 2004 (aged 73); Yakima, Washington, U.S.
- Batted: Left Threw: Right

MLB debut
- September 14, 1950, for the Cincinnati Reds

Last MLB appearance
- May 29, 1955, for the Chicago Cubs

MLB statistics
- Batting average: .259
- Home runs: 5
- Runs batted in: 11
- Stats at Baseball Reference

Teams
- Cincinnati Reds (1950–1951); Chicago Cubs (1955)

Theodore Nash Tappe (February 2, 1931 – February 13, 2004) was an American professional baseball player from 1950 to 1952, 1954 to 1955 and 1957 to 1961. An outfielder, he appeared in 34 Major League Baseball games played for the Cincinnati Reds (1950–1951) and Chicago Cubs (1955). The 6 ft 3 in (1.91 m), 185 lb (84 kg) Tappe was born in Seattle, Washington, and attended Washington State University, where he played one season of college baseball for the Cougars in 1950.

The 19-year-old Tappe had an unremarkable debut season in professional baseball until he reached the Major Leagues. After batting just .253 in the Class A Central League, Tappe was recalled by the Reds in September 1950. Sent into his first game on September 14 at Ebbets Field as a pinch hitter for Reds' pitcher Frank Smith, Tappe hit a home run off Erv Palica of the Brooklyn Dodgers. The Dodgers nevertheless won the game, 6–3. In 1951, after another lacklustre minor league campaign split between the Central League and the Double-A Texas League, Tappe was again recalled by Cincinnati in September, and registered his second MLB hit, a single off Bubba Church of the Philadelphia Phillies, exactly one year after his home run.

Tappe did not return to the Majors until he made the 1955 Cubs' roster coming out of spring training. He started 13 games in right field and appeared as a pinch hitter in ten others, all during the months of April and May, batting .260 with four home runs and ten runs batted in. All told, he collected 15 hits in the Major Leagues. He played the final five seasons of his professional career in the minor leagues, including service in the Class B Northwest League with the Wenatchee Chiefs, Yakima Bears and Salem Senators.

He died in Yakima, Washington, at the age of 73.

== See also ==
- Home run in first Major League at-bat
