= Foster Castleman =

American baseball player (1931–2020)

- Third baseman / Shortstop
- Born: January 1, 1931; Nashville, Tennessee, U.S.
- Died: November 9, 2020 (aged 89); The Villages, Florida, U.S.
- Batted: Right Threw: Right

MLB debut
- August 4, 1954, for the New York Giants

Last MLB appearance
- September 28, 1958, for the Baltimore Orioles

MLB statistics
- Batting average: .205
- Home runs: 20
- Runs batted in: 65
- Stats at Baseball Reference

Teams
- New York Giants (1954–1957); Baltimore Orioles (1958)

Foster Ephraim Castleman (January 1, 1931 – November 9, 2020) was an American professional baseball player. The native of Nashville, Tennessee, appeared in 268 games played over all or part of five seasons in Major League Baseball, from 1954 to 1958, for the New York Giants and Baltimore Orioles, mostly as a third baseman or shortstop. He threw and batted right-handed and was listed at 6 feet (1.83 m) tall and 175 pounds (79 kg).

Castleman's professional career extended from 1949 through 1960, with the 1951–52 seasons missed due to military service. He was called up to the Giants during their 1954 World Series championship season on August 4 and, in his debut, he bounced into a double play as a pinch hitter off Paul Minner of the Chicago Cubs. In limited service the rest of the way, starting one game at third base, he collected three hits, all singles, and one run batted in. He did not play in the 1954 World Series. In 1955, Castleman made the Giants' roster out of spring training and hit his first two Major League home runs on May 4–5, but he got into only 15 games and was sent back to the Triple-A Minneapolis Millers in late May.

Castleman's first full year in MLB was 1956. He succeeded Hank Thompson as the Giants' regular third baseman, hit 14 home runs (tied for third on the club) and started 97 games at the hot corner. But he batted only .226, and lost his starting job in 1957 when he batted only .162 and was sent back to Minneapolis in mid-June. Over the winter, the Giants moved to San Francisco, but Castleman never appeared for them in their new home. In March 1958, his contract was sold to the Orioles and he spent the entire season on Baltimore's roster as a reserve infielder, starting 64 games at shortstop, second only to Willy Miranda. Again, he struggled offensively, hitting only .170 in 98 games and 223 plate appearances. He finished his professional career at the Triple-A level in 1959–60.

As a big leaguer, Castleman collected 136 total hits, with 24 doubles and three triples to accompany his 20 home runs. He batted .205.

in his retirement he was employed by the real estate broker Coldwell Banker in their Cincinnati, Ohio office.

Formerly employed Ran D. Lee of Cincinnati OH

Castleman died in November 2020 at the age of 89.
