= Jim Constable =

American baseball player (1933–2002)

- Jim Constable in 1962
- Pitcher
- Born: June 14, 1933; Jonesborough, Tennessee, U.S.
- Died: September 4, 2002 (aged 69); Johnson City, Tennessee, U.S.
- Batted: Switch Threw: Left

MLB debut
- June 24, 1956, for the New York Giants

Last MLB appearance
- April 27, 1963, for the San Francisco Giants

MLB statistics
- Win–loss record: 3–4
- Earned run average: 4.87
- Strikeouts: 59
- Stats at Baseball Reference

Teams
- New York / San Francisco Giants (1956–1958); Cleveland Indians (1958); Washington Senators (1958); Milwaukee Braves (1962); San Francisco Giants (1963)

Jimmy Lee Constable (June 14, 1933 – September 4, 2002) was an American relief pitcher in Major League Baseball. From 1957 through 1963, he played for the New York/San Francisco Giants, Cleveland Indians, Washington Senators and Milwaukee Braves. Constable, nicknamed "Sheriff", was a switch-hitter and threw left-handed. Born in Jonesborough, Tennessee, he stood 6 feet 1 inch (1.85 m) and weighed 185 pounds (84 kg).

In a five-season career, Constable posted a 3–4 record with a 4.87 ERA and two saves in 56 games pitched.

Constable died in Johnson City, Tennessee, at the age of 69.
