= George Piktuzis =

American baseball player (1932–1993)

- Pitcher
- Born: January 3, 1932; Chicago, Illinois, U.S.
- Died: November 28, 1993 (aged 61); Long Beach, California, U.S.
- Batted: Right Threw: Left

MLB debut
- April 25, 1956, for the Chicago Cubs

Last MLB appearance
- April 28, 1956, for the Chicago Cubs

MLB statistics
- Win–loss record: 0–0
- Earned run average: 7.20
- Innings pitched: 5
- Stats at Baseball Reference

Teams
- Chicago Cubs (1956)

George Richard Piktuzis (January 3, 1932 – November 28, 1993) was an American professional baseball player, a left-handed pitcher who appeared as a relief pitcher in two games for the 1956 Chicago Cubs of Major League Baseball. The native of Chicago batted right-handed, stood 6 feet 2 inches (1.88 m) tall and weighed 200 pounds (91 kg).

Piktuzis' professional career lasted six seasons (1950–52; 1955–57). His MLB appearances came in April 1956 against the St. Louis Cardinals and Cincinnati Redlegs. He surrendered four earned runs and six hits, including a home run by Cincinnati's George Crowe, in five innings pitched. As a minor leaguer, he compiled a 34–62 (.354) record in 176 games.

George Piktuzis died in Long Beach, California, at the age of 61.
