= Dick Murphy (baseball) =

American baseball player (1931–2020)

- Pinch runner / Pinch hitter
- Born: October 25, 1931; Cincinnati, Ohio, U.S.
- Died: December 12, 2020 (aged 89); Indianapolis, Indiana, U.S.
- Batted: Left Threw: Left

MLB debut
- June 13, 1954, for the Cincinnati Redlegs

Last MLB appearance
- September 13, 1954, for the Cincinnati Redlegs

MLB statistics
- Games played: 6
- Hits: 0
- Runs scored: 1
- Stats at Baseball Reference

Teams
- Cincinnati Redlegs (1954)

Richard Lee Murphy (October 25, 1931 – December 12, 2020) was an American professional baseball player who played for three seasons (1954; 1957–1958) and had a six-game trial with the 1954 Cincinnati Redlegs of Major League Baseball. He threw and batted left-handed, stood 5 feet 11 inches (1.80 m) tall and weighed 170 pounds (77 kg).

Murphy attended Ohio University, where he was an All-American as an outfielder. He signed with his hometown Redlegs on June 12, 1954, and made his Major League debut the following day against the Brooklyn Dodgers at Crosley Field. In his only MLB plate appearance, he pinch hit for Cincinnati relief pitcher Jackie Collum against Brooklyn lefthander Johnny Podres and struck out. After a short tenure in minor league baseball, Murphy returned to the Redlegs that September and served as a pinch runner in five more games, scoring his only Major League run in his last appearance on September 13. He then spent two seasons in military service before resuming his minor league career in the Redleg farm system in 1957 and 1958. He retired after the latter campaign with a .192 career batting average and four home runs.
