= Harry Perkowski =

American baseball player (1922–2016)

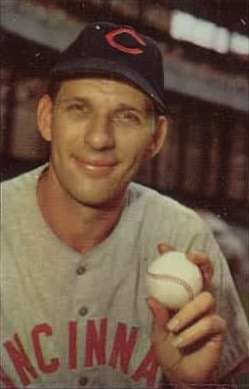
- Perkowski circa 1953
- Pitcher
- Born: September 6, 1922; Dante, Virginia, U.S.
- Died: April 20, 2016 (aged 93); Beckley, West Virginia, U.S.
- Batted: Left Threw: Left

MLB debut
- September 13, 1947, for the Cincinnati Reds

Last MLB appearance
- September 18, 1955, for the Chicago Cubs

MLB statistics
- Win–loss record: 33–40
- Earned run average: 4.37
- Strikeouts: 296
- Stats at Baseball Reference

Teams
- Cincinnati Reds / Redlegs (1947, 1949–1954); Chicago Cubs (1955)

Harry Walter Perkowski (September 6, 1922 – April 20, 2016) was an American pitcher in Major League Baseball who played between 1947 and 1955 for the Cincinnati Reds / Redlegs (1947, 1949–54) and Chicago Cubs (1955). Listed at 6 feet 3 inches (1.91 m), 196 pounds (89 kg), he batted and threw left-handed.

== Career ==
A native of Dante, Virginia, Perkowski started his baseball career playing semi-pro ball in the coal fields around his hometown. He later pitched briefly for the Natchez Giants of the Evangeline League before getting drafted and joining the U.S. Navy in 1943.

Perkowski joined the amphibious force during World War II, helping escort troops and tanks into hot spots on Landing Craft Tanks. He served 19 months in the Atlantic and 11 months in the Pacific, including four invasions during the war in Africa, Sicily, Italy, and Normandy. "I was all over the place just about", he later recalled.

Following his discharge from military service in 1946, Perkowski signed with the Cincinnati Reds and enjoyed an outstanding year in the Pioneer League for the Ogden Reds, posting a 23–6 record with 209 strikeouts and a 2.09 ERA in 247 innings pitched. He led the league with his 23 wins and his six shutouts tied for the league lead.

In 1947, Perkowski gained a promotion to the Columbia team of the South Atlantic League, where he finished 17–12 with 133 strikeouts and a 3.57 ERA in 247 innings before joining the Reds in late September. He posted a 3.68 ERA in three games (one start) before the season ended, but Cincinnati felt he was not quite ready for the major leagues at this point.

Perkowski spent 1948 with the Tulsa Oilers of the Texas League, hurling his second 20-victory season in the minors. He finished 22–10 with 163 strikeouts and a 2.98 ERA in 263 innings, leading the league in wins and hurled a remarkable 21 complete games to lead his team to a 91–63 record. In 1949, he went to the Syracuse Chiefs of the International League and posted a 14–12 record with 138 strikeouts and a 3.70 ERA in 209 innings.

After that, Perkowski joined the Reds again in 1950 and remained with the team for the next five years. His most productive season came in 1952, when he went 12–10 with career-highs in innings pitched (194), strikeouts (86) and ERA (3.80). He finished 12–11 with a 4.52 ERA in 1953. On July 19 of that year, he pitched a 12-inning, three-hit, 1–0 shutout against the New York Giants at Crosley Field. Battery teammate Hobie Landrith provided the difference with a walk-off home run in the bottom of the 12th.

At the end of 1954, Cincinnati traded Perkowski along with Jim Bolger and Ted Tappe to the Chicago Cubs in exchange for Johnny Klippstein and Jim Willis. He made 25 appearances for the Cubs in 1955, then returned to the minors in 1956 where he continued pitching until 1960, spending time with Los Angeles, Tulsa, Memphis, Fort Worth and Denver clubs.

In an eight-season majors career, Perkowski posted a 33–40 record with a 4.37 ERA in 184 appearances, including 76 starts, 24 complete games, four shutouts, five saves, and 697 2/3 innings of work.

Arm troubles soon caught up with Perkowski, though. He possessed a hard fastball and a devastating curve, but his delivery was bothered by control problems for most of his career as shown by his 0.91 strikeout-to-walk ratio (296-to-324). A good-hitting pitcher, he eventually was used in pinch-hitting duties. In 197 games, he posted a .180 average (43-for-239) with 13 RBI and nine extra bases, including one home run. A fine fielder as well, he committed only two errors in 171 total chances for a .988 fielding percentage.

== Later life and death ==
Following baseball Perkowski served in local law enforcement, ambulance and school bus driver, and with the West Virginia Department of Highways. He died in Beckley, West Virginia on April 20, 2016, aged 93.
