= Cliff Ross =

American baseball player (1928–1999)

- Pitcher
- Born: August 3, 1928; Philadelphia, Pennsylvania, U.S.
- Died: April 12, 1999 (aged 70); Abington Township, Pennsylvania, U.S.
- Batted: Left Threw: Left

MLB debut
- September 11, 1954, for the Cincinnati Redlegs

Last MLB appearance
- September 20, 1954, for the Cincinnati Redlegs

MLB statistics
- Win–loss record: 0–0
- Earned run average: 0.00
- Innings pitched: 2 2/3
- Stats at Baseball Reference

Teams
- Cincinnati Redlegs (1954)

Clifford David Ross (August 3, 1928 – April 12, 1999) was an American professional baseball player: a 6 ft 4 in (1.93 m), 195 lb (88 kg) left-handed pitcher. Born in Philadelphia, Ross played eight seasons of pro baseball between 1947 and 1957 and appeared in four games played for the Cincinnati Redlegs of Major League Baseball at the end of the 1954 season.

== Career ==
Ross was recalled by the Redlegs after completing his most successful minor league season, in which we won 13 of 23 decisions with a 2.91 earned run average for the Class A Schenectady Blue Jays. Pitching in relief, Ross allowed no runs and no hits in his four MLB games, three of them against first division opponents. He struck out one hitter and — notably for a pitcher who once issued 204 bases on balls in 143 innings pitched in the minors — walked no one. In 2 2/3 innings, Ross faced the minimum of eight batsmen and retired them all. He did not earn a decision, but recorded one save.

Ross was listed on the Redlegs' 1955 spring training roster, but was sent to the minor leagues before the campaign began and never pitched again in the Major Leagues. As a minor leaguer, he won 45 and lost 69 in 229 appearances.
