= Ed Winceniak =

American baseball player (1929–2023)

- Infielder
- Born: April 16, 1929; Chicago, Illinois, U.S.
- Died: October 19, 2023 (aged 94); Orland Park, Illinois, U.S.
- Batted: Right Threw: Right

MLB debut
- April 25, 1956, for the Chicago Cubs

Last MLB appearance
- May 12, 1957, for the Chicago Cubs

MLB statistics
- Batting average: .209
- Home runs: 1
- Runs batted in: 8
- Stats at Baseball Reference

Teams
- Chicago Cubs (1956–1957)

Edward Joseph Winceniak (April 16, 1929 – October 19, 2023) was an American professional baseball player and scout. He was born in Chicago, Illinois. An infielder, he appeared in 32 games played over parts of two seasons (1956–57) in Major League Baseball for the Chicago Cubs. Winceniak batted and threw right-handed and was listed as 5 feet 9 inches (1.75 m) tall and 165 pounds (75 kg).

His professional career began in 1948 and ended in 1959 in the minor leagues, with three seasons (1951–53) out of action. During his two trials with the Cubs, he was used largely as a pinch hitter or pinch runner, appearing in the field in 12 of his 32 MLB games played. Altogether, Winceniak registered 71 plate appearances, with six runs scored and 14 career hits. His lone home run was hit off Hal Jeffcoat of the Cincinnati Redlegs on May 12, 1957. The solo shot came at Wrigley Field during the first game of a doubleheader. Winceniak also started the nightcap and collected a single off Don Gross. Those were his last two games in the majors as he was sent to the Open-Classification Portland Beavers of the Pacific Coast League at the May cutdown.

Winceniak died in Orland Park, Illinois, on October 19, 2023, at the age of 94.
