= Bob Zick =

American baseball player (1927–2017)

- Pitcher
- Born: April 26, 1927; Chicago, Illinois, U.S.
- Died: June 12, 2017 (aged 90); Sun City, Arizona, U.S.
- Batted: Left Threw: Right

MLB debut
- May 2, 1954, for the Chicago Cubs

Last MLB appearance
- September 6, 1954, for the Chicago Cubs

MLB statistics
- Earned run average: 8.27
- Win–loss record: 0–0
- Strikeouts: 9
- Stats at Baseball Reference

Teams
- Chicago Cubs (1954)

Robert George Zick (April 26, 1927 – June 12, 2017) was an American professional baseball pitcher. He was born in Chicago, Illinois. He appeared in eight games in Major League Baseball for the Chicago Cubs in 1954. He batted left-handed and threw right-handed playing baseball.

== Career ==
Zick attended Fenger Academy High School in Chicago. He was signed by the Philadelphia Athletics as an amateur free agent on January 1, 1949. On December 3, 1951, Zick was selected by Cubs from the Athletics in the minor league draft. Zick made his major league debut on May 2, 1954, with the Chicago Cubs at age 27. He pitched 8 games, all as a relief pitcher, pitching 16.1 innings. He played his final game on September 6, 1954. He died June 12, 2017.
