= Bob Rush (baseball) =

American baseball player (1925–2011)

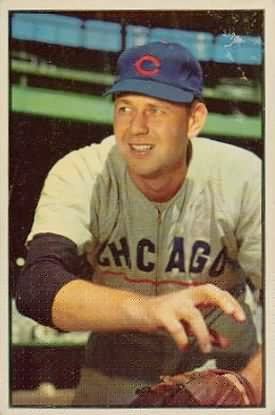
- Pitcher
- Born: December 21, 1925; Battle Creek, Michigan, U.S.
- Died: March 19, 2011 (aged 85); Mesa, Arizona, U.S.
- Batted: Right Threw: Right

MLB debut
- April 22, 1948, for the Chicago Cubs

Last MLB appearance
- August 7, 1960, for the Chicago White Sox

MLB statistics
- Win–loss record: 127–152
- Earned run average: 3.65
- Strikeouts: 1,244
- Stats at Baseball Reference

Teams
- Chicago Cubs (1948–1957); Milwaukee Braves (1958–1960); Chicago White Sox (1960)

Career highlights and awards
- 2× All-Star (1950, 1952)

Robert Ransom Rush (December 21, 1925 – March 19, 2011) was an American professional baseball pitcher who appeared in 417 games in Major League Baseball from 1948 to 1960 for the Chicago Cubs, Milwaukee Braves and Chicago White Sox. He threw and batted right-handed, stood 6 feet 4 inches (1.93 m) tall and weighed 205 pounds (93 kg). Rush was a National League All-Star selection in 1950 and 1952. Although he was a starting pitcher for the Cubs for ten seasons, and worked in 339 total games for them, he did not reach the postseason until he was a Milwaukee Brave, when he appeared in the 1958 World Series.

== Pitching career ==
=== Chicago Cubs ===
Born in Battle Creek, Michigan, Rush graduated from James Whitcomb Riley High School in South Bend, Indiana, and served in the United States Army during World War II. He was a combat veteran of the European theatre in Germany as a member of General George S. Patton's Third Army.

His pro career began in the Cub farm system in 1947. After only one year of minor-league seasoning, he joined the Cubs' MLB pitching staff. Pitching for a succession of poor teams, he lost 140 of the 250 decisions he earned as a Cub.

Rush tied for the National League lead in games lost with 20 in 1950, his first All-Star season. Two years later, he had the best year of his career, winning 17 games (third most in the league) with a stellar 2.70 earned run average, fifth-best in the Senior Circuit. Selected to his second All-Star team that year, he appeared in the 1952 midsummer classic, played July 8 at Shibe Park. Rush worked two innings, entering the game in the fourth with the NL ahead, 1–0. He allowed the rival American League to forge ahead with two runs and three hits. But in the very next half-inning, his National League teammates, led by fellow Cub Hank Sauer, who homered, got those runs back to regain the lead, 3–2. Rush then held the Junior Circuit off the scoreboard in the fifth inning. With the game having gone the required 41/2 innings, the National League—and Rush—were awarded a victory when the contest was ended by rain.

In addition to his 17–13 record in 1952, Rush also posted back-to-back over-.500 seasons in 1955 (13–11) and 1956 (13–10); his earned run averages of 3.50 and 3.19 during those seasons were ninth and seventh, respectively, in the National League.

=== Milwaukee Braves ===
Rush was traded to the defending world champion Braves in a five-player deal in December 1957. He then worked in 28 games, starting 20, and posted five complete games and two shutouts during the 1958 Braves' successful defense of their league pennant. He was Milwaukee's starting pitcher for Game 3 of the 1958 World Series at Yankee Stadium, with the Braves ahead in the Series, two games to none. Rush gave the Braves six strong innings, allowing the New York Yankees only three hits. But control problems during the fifth frame proved costly when Rush's three walks loaded the bases for Hank Bauer's two-run single. Those were all the runs Yankee starter Don Larsen needed in a 4–0 win. While the Braves captured Game 4 to build a three-games-to-one advantage, New York won Games 5–7 to take the world title away from Milwaukee.

Rush was primarily a relief pitcher for the 1959 Braves, making nine spot starts among his 30 appearances during the 154-game schedule and posting five victories and an effective 2.42 earned run average. The Braves found themselves embroiled in a three-way pennant fight with the Los Angeles Dodgers and San Francisco Giants that went down to the season's final weekend. When it ended, the Braves and Dodgers, both with 86–68 records, were deadlocked for the National League pennant, and a best-of-three tie-breaker series was necessary to determine a champion.

The Dodgers won Game 1 at Milwaukee, putting the Braves' backs against the wall. In Game 2, at the Los Angeles Memorial Coliseum on September 29, the Braves squandered a 5–2 lead when the Dodgers rallied for three runs in the bottom of the ninth inning, tying the score and sending the contest into extra innings. In the 11th frame, Rush was called into the game with the Braves in dire straights: the Dodgers had the bases loaded, with two out. But he retired Charlie Neal on a ground ball to secure the third out and preserve the tie. In the 12th inning, Milwaukee did not score in its half and Rush returned to the mound. He retired the first two Los Angeles hitters, Wally Moon and Stan Williams, but then his fortunes changed. Gil Hodges walked and was singled to second base by Joe Pignatano. Veteran Carl Furillo then made an infield hit to shortstop, and when Félix Mantilla threw wildly to first base, Hodges scored the pennant-deciding run on the error. Rush gave up no earned runs, but was charged with the loss.

=== Career statistics and trivia ===
Rush split 1960 between the Braves and the American League White Sox, getting into 19 total games as a relief pitcher. He earned his final two MLB victories and a save for Milwaukee before being sent to the White Sox on June 11. He was given his unconditional release in November, ending his pitching career.

All told, Rush compiled a 127–152 won–lost record in MLB, with a 3.65 earned run average, 118 complete games and 16 shutouts. He earned eight saves coming out of the bullpen. In 2,4102/3 innings pitched, he allowed 2,327 hits and 789 bases on balls. He struck out 1,244.

Rush was not afraid to throw brushback pitches. Alvin Dark recalled that when he played, some of his teammates would have trouble sleeping the night before they faced Rush in a game. It did not matter whether the hitter was left-handed or right-handed; Rush would knock them down no matter what side of the plate they stood on.

On June 11, 1950, Rush and pitcher Warren Spahn of the Boston Braves each stole a base against each other; no opposing pitchers again stole a base in the same game until May 3, 2004, when Jason Marquis and Greg Maddux repeated the feat.

Late in the 1957 season, while Rush was warming up in the Wrigley Field bullpen during a game, a wild pitch he threw went into the stands and injured a spectator, who sued him and the Cubs, one of the few times in Major League Baseball history when a player has been named as a defendant by a fan injured by an object that left the field. The court granted Rush summary judgement which was affirmed on appeal a decade later; however it held that the Baseball Rule, which generally immunizes teams against suits by fans injured by foul balls who sit in seats outside the backstop's protection, did not extend to an errantly thrown ball and that a jury could decide if the Cubs had adequately anticipated the risk of one leaving the field and striking a fan.

Bob Rush died in Mesa, Arizona, the Cubs' longtime spring training home, at age 85.
