= Vito Valentinetti =

American baseball player (1928–2021)

- Pitcher
- Born: September 16, 1928; West New York, New Jersey, U.S.
- Died: August 5, 2021 (aged 92); Mount Vernon, New York, U.S.
- Batted: Right Threw: Right

MLB debut
- June 20, 1954, for the Chicago White Sox

Last MLB appearance
- May 11, 1959, for the Washington Senators

MLB statistics
- Win–loss record: 13–14
- Earned run average: 4.73
- Strikeouts: 94
- Stats at Baseball Reference

Teams
- Chicago White Sox (1954); Chicago Cubs (1956–1957); Cleveland Indians (1957); Detroit Tigers (1958); Washington Senators (1958–1959)

Vito John Valentinetti (September 16, 1928 – August 5, 2021) was an American professional baseball pitcher. His nine-year career included one full season and parts of four others in Major League Baseball (MLB) with the Chicago White Sox (1954), Chicago Cubs (1956–57), Cleveland Indians (1957), Detroit Tigers (1958), and Washington Senators (1958–59).

== Biography ==
Valentinetti was born in West New York, New Jersey to immigrants from Lercara Friddi, Sicily. A graduate of Iona College, he entered pro baseball in 1950 in the White Sox system, and missed two seasons (1952–53) while serving in the military during the Korean War.

Valentinetti made his MLB debut with the White Sox on June 20, 1954, and that was the only game he ever pitched for the team. He surrendered six runs on four hits and two bases on balls in one inning in a 16–6 loss to the New York Yankees. Sent back to the minor leagues, he was acquired by the crosstown Cubs in the 1955 Rule 5 Draft.

Valentinetti spent the entire 1956 season with the Cubs, working in 42 games, 40 in relief, and posting a 6–4 win–loss record, a 3.78 earned run average and one save. The following season, however, he began to bounce around: between 1957 and 1960, he was a member of four MLB teams, five minor league clubs and seven different organizations. Although he spent part of 1958 in the minors, he pitched in 38 MLB games that season for Detroit and Washington. He made ten starts for the Senators, and notched two complete games. After only seven games in 1959, however, Valentinetti was sent back to the minors at the May cutdown, finishing his career in Triple-A in 1960.

In 108 MLB games, including 15 starts, and 257 innings pitched, Valentinetti allowed 266 hits and 122 walks, with 96 strikeouts, three complete games and three saves.

Following baseball, Valentinetti worked in construction and in city and state government positions in New York. He died on August 5, 2021, at age 92.
