= Owen Friend =

American baseball player (1927–2007)

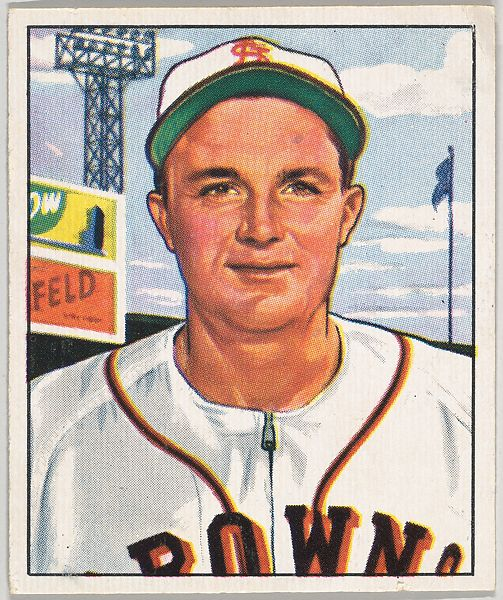
- Second baseman
- Born: March 21, 1927; Granite City, Illinois, U.S.
- Died: October 14, 2007 (aged 80); Wichita, Kansas, U.S.
- Batted: Right Threw: Right

MLB debut
- October 2, 1949, for the St. Louis Browns

Last MLB appearance
- May 16, 1956, for the Chicago Cubs

MLB statistics
- Batting average: .227
- Home runs: 13
- Runs batted in: 76
- Stats at Baseball Reference

Teams
- St. Louis Browns (1949–1950); Detroit Tigers (1953); Cleveland Indians (1953); Boston Red Sox (1955); Chicago Cubs (1955–1956)

Owen Lacey Friend (March 21, 1927 – October 14, 2007) was an American Major League Baseball second baseman for five different teams between 1949 and 1956. Listed at 6'1, 180 lb., Friend batted and threw right-handed. Nicknamed "Red", he was born in Granite City, Illinois.

Strictly a line drive hitter, Friend entered the majors with the St. Louis Browns, playing for them two years (1949–50) before joining the Detroit Tigers (1953), Cleveland Indians (1953), Boston Red Sox (1955) and Chicago Cubs (1955–56). His most productive season came for the 1950 Browns, when he posted career-numbers in games played (119), home runs (8), RBI (50) and runs (48), while hitting a .237 batting average. In a five-season career, Friend was a .227 hitter (136–for–598) with 13 home runs and 76 RBI in 208 games, including 24 doubles, two triples, and two stolen bases. As an infielder, he made 194 appearances at second base (141), third base (27) and shortstop (26).

Following his playing retirement, Friend managed in the minors during 11 seasons (1960–65, 1967, 1970–71, 1974–75), served as a scout for the Houston Astros (1966) and Baltimore Orioles (1967–68), and also joined the original coaching staff of the 1969 Kansas City Royals. Friend wore uniform number 5 for the Royals, a number George Brett would later wear and retire. Friend died in Wichita, Kansas at age 80.

== Sources ==
- Baseball Reference
- Retrosheet
- The Deadball Era
