= Bill Tremel =

American baseball player (1929–2013)

- Pitcher
- Born: July 4, 1929; Lilly, Pennsylvania, U.S.
- Died: December 22, 2013 (aged 84); Hollidaysburg, Pennsylvania, U.S.
- Batted: Right Threw: Right

MLB debut
- June 12, 1954, for the Chicago Cubs

Last MLB appearance
- April 27, 1956, for the Chicago Cubs

MLB statistics
- Win–loss record: 4–2
- Earned run average: 4.05
- Strikeouts: 34
- Stats at Baseball Reference

Teams
- Chicago Cubs (1954–1956)

William Leonard Tremel (July 4, 1929 – December 22, 2013) was an American professional baseball player, a right-handed relief pitcher who appeared in parts of three Major League Baseball seasons for the 1954–56 Chicago Cubs. Nicknamed "Mumbles", Tremel batted right-handed, stood 5 feet 11 inches (1.80 m) tall and weighed 180 pounds (82 kg).

== Early life ==
Tremel was born July 4, 1929, in Lilly, Pennsylvania, to Charles and Mary (Galla) Tremel. He was a 1948 graduate of Lilly high school where he played football and basketball along with baseball.

== Baseball career ==
Tremel's contract was purchased by the Cubs from the unaffiliated Shreveport Sports of the Class AA Texas League during the 1954 season after Tremel posted 2 1/2 good seasons there, winning 21 of 28 decisions, largely in relief. Appearing in 33 games for the Cubs during 1954, he finished 22 of them and was credited with one victory and four saves.

Tremel started the 1955 season in the minor leagues but was recalled to the Cubs in July, and posted an MLB-career-best 3–0 record and 3.72 earned run average, with two more saves, in 23 games. He made the Cub roster at the start of the 1956 campaign, but in his only appearance, April 27 against the Cincinnati Redlegs at Crosley Field, he gave up three hits and an earned run in one-third of an inning. He spent the rest of that season in the Texas League, and the rest of his professional career in the minors. He was a mainstay in the Texas circuit and with Shreveport, spending all or portions of seven of his 11 pro years with the Sports.

All told, Tremel worked in 57 Major League games. In 91 innings, he gave up 81 hits and 23 bases on balls, while recording 260 strikeouts.

== Later life ==
After retiring from baseball in 1959, Tremel spent 31 years with the SKF corporation in Altoona, Pennsylvania.

In 1999, Tremel received a plaque honoring his legacy in the game and in the community; the plaque stands behind the backstop at Lilly, Pennsylvania's War Memorial Field. In 2002, he was inducted into the Cambria County Sports Hall of Fame.

Tremel died on December 22, 2013, in Hollidaysburg, Pennsylvania.
