= Jim Bolger (baseball) =

American baseball player (1932–2020)

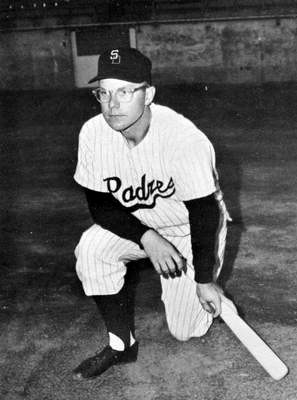
- Outfielder
- Born: February 23, 1932; Cincinnati, Ohio, U.S.
- Died: April 9, 2020 (aged 88); Green Township, Ohio, U.S.
- Batted: Right Threw: Right

MLB debut
- June 24, 1950, for the Cincinnati Reds

Last MLB appearance
- September 18, 1959, for the Philadelphia Phillies

MLB statistics
- Batting average: .229
- Home runs: 6
- Runs batted in: 48
- Stats at Baseball Reference

Teams
- Cincinnati Reds/Redlegs (1950–1951, 1954); Chicago Cubs (1955, 1957–1958); Cleveland Indians (1959); Philadelphia Phillies (1959)

James Cyril Bolger (February 23, 1932 – April 9, 2020) was an American professional baseball outfielder. He appeared in 312 games over all or parts of seven Major League Baseball (MLB) seasons, but spent over two-thirds of his big-league playing time — 260 games — as a member of the Chicago Cubs. Bolger had short stints with the Cincinnati Reds (nine games), Cleveland Indians (eight), and Philadelphia Phillies (35 games). His MLB totals included 140 hits, 14 doubles, six triples, and six home runs, with a career batting average of .229. Bolger threw and batted right-handed. During his playing days, he stood 6 feet 2 inches (1.88 m) tall and weighed 180 pounds (82 kg).

Born in Cincinnati, Ohio, Bolger attended Purcell Marian High School. He began his pro career with the 1950 Reds, also playing Minor League Baseball (MiLB) in their farm system.

On October 14, 1951, Bolger was traded by the Cincinnati Redlegs to Buffalo for pitchers Moe Savransky and Tom Acker.

Bolger's best MLB season came in 1957. He spent the full season with the Cubs as their fourth outfielder, appeared in 112 games (starting 57, including two starts as a third baseman), and batted a career-high .275, in 273 at-bats. The previous year, Bolger had been named a Pacific Coast League (PCL) all-star, after he batted .326, with 147 runs batted in, 193 hits, and 28 home runs, as a member of the Los Angeles Angels.

Bolger's 13-year professional career ended in 1962, after he batted .319 for the Triple-A Louisville Colonels.

Bolger died on April 9, 2020, at the age of 88.
