= Jim Davis (pitcher) =

American baseball player (1924–1995)

- Pitcher
- Born: September 15, 1924; Red Bluff, California, U.S.
- Died: November 30, 1995 (aged 71); San Mateo, California, U.S.
- Batted: Both Threw: Left

MLB debut
- April 18, 1954, for the Chicago Cubs

Last MLB appearance
- July 7, 1957, for the New York Giants

MLB statistics
- Win–loss record: 24–26
- Earned run average: 4.01
- Strikeouts: 197
- Stats at Baseball Reference

Teams
- Chicago Cubs (1954–1956); St. Louis Cardinals (1957); New York Giants (1957)

James Bennett Davis (September 15, 1924 – November 30, 1995) was an American professional baseball pitcher who appeared in 154 games in Major League Baseball for the Chicago Cubs (1954–1956), St. Louis Cardinals (1957) and New York Giants (1957). In 1956, Davis became the first MLB pitcher in forty years to record four strikeouts in a single inning.

Born in Red Bluff, California, Davis was a left-handed pitcher who stood 6 feet (1.8 m) tall and weighed 180 pounds (82 kg). After graduating from Red Bluff High School, he served in the United States Marine Corps during World War II. In 1946, he signed with the Boston Red Sox and toiled in their farm system for four years before his contract was sold to the Triple-A Seattle Rainiers in 1950. Over four seasons, he appeared in 157 games for Seattle before being acquired by the Cubs in 1954.

Davis' repertoire included both a screwball and a knuckler. His rookie 1954 season was his finest; he set MLB career bests in games (46), victories (11), winning percentage (.611), complete games (two), saves (four, ninth in the National League), and earned run average (3.52 in 1272/3 innings pitched). However, his performance fell off in 1955, when he led the league in wild pitches. But on May 27, 1956, Davis entered the record books when he struck out four Cardinals in the sixth inning of the first game of a doubleheader. Davis fanned Hal Smith, Jackie Brandt and Lindy McDaniel in succession; McDaniel reached first base on an error by Cub catcher Hobie Landrith, allowing a run to score but prolonging the frame long enough for Davis to get Don Blasingame on a called third strike.

After the 1956 season, Davis was traded to the Cardinals (with Landrith) and in ten relief appearances for St. Louis in 1957, he recorded one save but pitched ineffectively. He was waived to the Giants on June 4 and worked in ten more games before returning to the minor leagues. He retired in 1959 after a 14-year professional baseball career. In 154 MLB games, 39 as a starting pitcher, he posted a 24–26 won–lost record and a 4.01 earned run average, with four complete games, one shutout and eight saves. In 4061/3 innings pitched, he allowed 383 hits and 179 bases on balls, with 197 strikeouts.

Davis' uncles, Lee and Marv Grissom, were major league pitchers. Davis and Marv Grissom opposed each other 11 times between 1954 and June 1957, and they were briefly teammates on the 1957 Giants.

Jim Davis died in San Mateo, California, at age 71 in 1995.

== See also ==
- List of Major League Baseball single-inning strikeout leaders
