= Hank Sauer =

American baseball player (1917–2001)

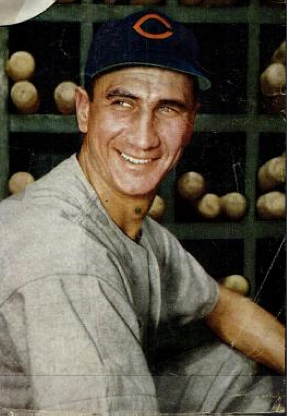
- Sauer as a Red, 1948
- Left fielder
- Born: March 17, 1917; Pittsburgh, Pennsylvania, U.S.
- Died: August 24, 2001 (aged 84); Burlingame, California, U.S.
- Batted: Right Threw: Right

MLB debut
- September 9, 1941, for the Cincinnati Reds

Last MLB appearance
- August 17, 1959, for the San Francisco Giants

MLB statistics
- Batting average: .266
- Home runs: 288
- Runs batted in: 876
- Stats at Baseball Reference

Teams
- Cincinnati Reds (1941–1942, 1945, 1948–1949); Chicago Cubs (1949–1955); St. Louis Cardinals (1956); New York / San Francisco Giants (1957–1959)

Career highlights and awards
- 2× All-Star (1950, 1952); NL MVP (1952); NL home run leader (1952); NL RBI leader (1952); Chicago Cubs Hall of Fame

Henry John Sauer (March 17, 1917 – August 24, 2001) was an American professional baseball player, coach and scout. He appeared in 1,399 games, primarily as a left fielder, in Major League Baseball (MLB) for the Cincinnati Reds (1941–1942, 1945, 1948–1949), Chicago Cubs (1949–1955), St. Louis Cardinals (1956), and New York / San Francisco Giants (1957–1959). A popular player with the Cubs where he had his peak seasons, he was known as "the Mayor of Wrigley Field".

A two-time All-Star, Sauer hit more than 30 home runs six times in the seven seasons of 1948 through 1954 (limited to only 19 in 1953 after suffering a broken hand). He was a feared slugger for the early-1950s Cubs, exceeding the 30-homer mark five times in a Chicago uniform, with a career-high of 41 in 1954. His most productive season came in 1952, when Sauer led the National League in home runs (37, tied with Ralph Kiner) and runs batted in (121), and was named the Most Valuable Player. Sauer and Johnny Bench are the only players in major league history ever to have hit three homers in a single game twice against the same pitcher. He did it 1950 and 1952 while with the Cubs, victimizing Curt Simmons of the Philadelphia Phillies. A younger brother, Ed, also an outfielder, played in 189 games in the majors for three National League teams during the 1940s.

== Early life ==
Sauer was born on March 17, 1917, in Pittsburgh, Pennsylvania. He was raised in Bellevue, Pennsylvania and attended Sam Hamilton High School, where he played three years on the baseball, basketball and football teams, and also set records as a swimmer.

Sauer played semipro baseball and was signed by the New York Yankees in 1937, and assigned to play in their minor league system.

== Minor league career ==
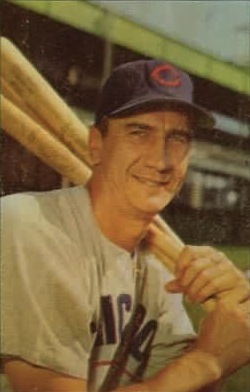
As a Cub, c. 1953

Sauer was listed as 6 feet 3 inches (1.91 m) tall and 198 pounds (90 kg). He threw and batted right-handed. He was known by the nickname “Honk” or "Honker" because of his nose, among others.

He started his professional career in 1937 with the New York Yankees' organization, playing for the Class D Butler Yankees of the Pennsylvania State Association. Sauer hit a triple and single in his first professional game on June 28, 1937. He played in 64 games that season with a .268 batting average. He returned to Butler in 1938, and hit .351 in 100 games, with 12 home runs, 74 runs batted in (RBI), 89 runs scored, 29 doubles, eight triples and a .994 OPS (on base plus slugging). He also had 25 stolen bases. He led the Pennsylvania State Association in batting average, and was second in OPS.

In 1939, he was promoted to the Class C Akron Yankees of the Middle Atlantic League, as a first baseman. In 127 games, he hit .301 with 13 home runs. After the season ended, the Cincinnati Reds selected Sauer in the minor league draft. In 1940, the Reds assigned Sauer to the Class A-1 Birmingham Barons of the Southern Association, where he hit .292 with nine home runs in 118 games. In 1941 with Birmingham, he hit .330 with 19 home runs. He was the first Barons player ever to hit a homerun ball over the scoreboard in Birmingham's Rickwood Field. After the season ended, he was called up to the Reds that September.

In 1942, he played in 82 games for the Double-A Syracuse Chiefs of the International League, batting .213, with 11 home runs in 291 at bats. He was with the Reds for a portion of the season. In 1943, he was again assigned to the Double-A Chiefs. He hit .275, with 12 home runs, 75 RBI and 73 runs. During World War II, Sauer served in the United States Coast Guard, and did not play professional baseball in 1944. After returning from the Coast Guard in 1945, he did not play in the minor leagues, but did play for the Reds that year.

Sauer spent the full seasons of 1946 and 1947 with the now Triple-A Syracuse Chiefs of the International League. In 1946, he hit .282, with 21 home runs, 90 RBIs, 99 runs and an .848 OPS. In 1947, Sauer was batting third in the Chiefs lineup. Early in the season his bat speed was so quick he kept pulling the ball foul. He had been using a 35-ounce bat (.99 kg). Manager Jewell Ens recommended that Sauer use a Chick Hafey model 36 inch long 40-ounce (1.13 kg) bat to slow down Sauer’s swing slightly. Ens also said that Sauer kept breaking the lighter bats, and this was wasting his hitting power; which the heavier bat would capture. After two weeks, the experiment was a success, transforming Sauer’s future career.

Sauer led the 1947 International League in runs scored (130), hits (182), RBIs (141) and OPS (1.096). He had 50 home runs, three fewer than league leader Howie Moss, and hit .336, one percentage point behind batting champion Nippy Jones. He was named the International League's MVP in 1947. The Sporting News named him the Minor League Player of the Year.

1947 was his final minor league season.

== Major league career ==
=== Cincinnati Reds ===
The Reds called Sauer up in September 1941, and he hit .303 in nine games. They switched him defensively from first base to the outfield. He played in seven games for the Reds in 1942, mostly in May, hitting .250 in 20 at bats, with two home runs. After completing his World War II service with the U.S. Coast Guard in 1945, Sauer appeared in 31 games for the Reds in September 1945. He hit .293 in 116 at bats, with five home runs.

After his 1947 MVP season for the Syracuse Chiefs, in 1948 the Reds brought the 31-year old Sauer up to the Major Leagues for the entire season, and he never returned to the minor leagues. He became a starter in the outfield and hit .260, leading the team in home runs (35), RBIs (97), runs (78) and OPS (.844). He was fourth in the National League in home runs, seventh in RBIs, and 10th in OPS. He also struck out more than any other NL batter that season (85).

Sauer started slowly with the Reds in 1949. After playing 42 games, he was hitting .237, with only four home runs in his first 30 games. On June 15, he was traded to the Cubs in a two-for-two, all-outfielder trade involving Sauer and Frank Baumholtz going to the Cubs for Harry Walker and Peanuts Lowrey.

=== Chicago Cubs ===
Sauer played for the Cubs during a time when the Cubs were especially moribund (1949 to 1955), never finishing above fifth place and never having a season above .500. Sauer provided some joy for the team's fans with his power hitting (198 home runs and 587 RBI in seven years), and was once described as "the one bright star on lowly Cubs teams that struggled just to finish higher than last place". In his first month with the Cubs in 1949 he hit 11 home runs, and his popularity with the Cubs fans soon after earned him the nickname "The Mayor of Wrigley Field". He was called the team’s most popular player since Gabby Hartnett (a Hall of Famer who played 19 years with the Cubs) and remained the Cubs most popular player for many years.

After being traded to the Cubs in 1949, Sauer became a starting outfielder. He played in 96 games, hitting .291, with 27 home runs, 83 RBIs and 59 runs scored in only 357 at bats. He led the team in home runs and RBIs even though he only played a partial season with the Cubs. He was 19th in NL Most Valuable Player voting. In 1949, he was third in the NL in home runs (31) and ninth in RBIs (99).

==== 1950 All-Star controversy ====
In 1950, Sauer was voted by the fans to the NL All-Star Team for the first time, as a starting outfielder (along with Ralph Kiner and Enos Slaughter). The game was played in Chicago, at Comiskey Park (home of the American League Chicago White Sox). A controversy arose when NL manager Burt Shotten of the Brooklyn Dodgers wanted to replace Sauer as a starter with Dodger center fielder Duke Snider, on the basis that the outfielders the fans selected did not include a center fielder and the team needed someone who could play center field in the All-Star Game. Commissioner Happy Chandler originally permitted Shotten to proceed with this change, but then reversed himself after considerable public pressure from Cubs fans. He told Shotten to follow the fans vote and overruled the decision to replace Sauer with Snider. Before the game began, Shotten was strongly booed by the Chicago fans.

In 1950, Sauer hit .274, with 32 home runs, 103 RBIs, and 85 runs. He was tied for third in the NL in home runs, and tied for ninth in RBIs. In 1951, he hit .263, with 30 home runs (sixth best in the NL), 89 RBIs, and 77 runs.

==== 1952 MVP ====
1952 was arguably his best season. In spring training, he worked on changing his hitting style to hit the ball where it was pitched instead of trying to pull every pitch. This was in part driven by opposing teams using an infield shift against him when Sauer batted. He worked on this skill by using a batting tee, and learning from utility man teammate, Bob Ramazzotti. In 1952, Sauer led all Major League players with 121 RBIs, and was tied with future Hall of Fame outfielder Ralph Kiner with the most home runs by any player that season (37). (Kiner later joined the Cubs and became Sauer's teammate in 1953 and 1954.) On the season, Sauer hit .270, with 89 runs, an .892 OPS, and career highs in bases on balls (77) and strikeouts (92).

The 35-year old Sauer was selected the National League's Most Valuable Player in 1952, even though the Cubs finished the season in fifth place. He edged out future Hall of Fame pitcher Robin Roberts who had a 28–7 record that season. Sauer said "The MVP was the top thrill for me . . . and I beat out a heckuva guy".

Sauer was named to the NL All-Star Team for the second and final time in 1952. One of the highlights of Sauer's tenure in Chicago occurred during the 1952 Major League Baseball All-Star Game, played July 8 at Shibe Park, Philadelphia. Starting in left field for the National League and batting cleanup, Sauer came to bat in the fourth inning with the NL trailing 2–1 and Stan Musial on first base. Facing eventual Hall of Famer Bob Lemon, Sauer hit a long two-run homer to give his team the lead. When the game was called due to rain after it had completed the mandatory five innings, the NL was awarded the 3–2 victory and Sauer's home run stood as the winning blow. Sauer once called his home run against Lemon his greatest thrill.

In 1953, he suffered broken fingers and a broken hand early in the season, affecting his ability to grip the bat which hampered his playing time and production. He played in only 108 games, batting .263 with 19 home runs, 60 RBI and 61 runs. He followed an offseason regime of exercising with hand grips to improve his hand strength and grip leading into the 1954 season.

At age 37 in 1954, he came back to record career highs of 41 home runs, 98 runs scored, and a .938 OPS. He tied for third in the National League in home runs, with Willie Mays, was seventh in the NL in OPS, and tied for eighth in RBIs with future Hall of Fame third baseman Eddie Mathews (103).

Despite his production, the Cubs 1955 contract offer was for $1,500 less than he was paid in 1954, on the basis that the Cubs could have just as easily finished in seventh place with or without him. After responding about how he brought fans to watch the Cubs, Sauer settled for receiving the same salary as in 1954. In 1955, Sauer had physical ailments early in the season and was in a hitting slump well into May. On the season, he batted only .211 in 79 games for the Cubs, with 12 home runs and 28 RBIs.

=== St. Louis Cardinals and New York/San Francisco Giants ===
Sauer was traded to the St. Louis Cardinals during spring training in 1956, for Pete Whisenant. During pregame batting practice before an early May game that season, Sauer was hit in the head by a bat that had slipped out of teammate Walker Cooper's hands. He was taken off the field in a stretcher and required 50 stitches to save his ear. Sauer appeared in 75 games for the Cardinals, playing only 37 of those games in the field; starting 34 of those in the outfield. He batted .298, with five home runs and 24 RBIs. The Cardinals unconditionally released the 39-year old Sauer on October 16, 1956.

He had been considering a return to the minor leagues after being released, but was contacted by New York Giants' vice president Chub Feeney about playing for the Giants. On October 26, 1956, Sauer signed as a free agent with the New York Giants. In 1957, the club's last year in New York City, the 40-year old Sauer became a starting outfielder again. He hit 26 home runs with 76 RBIs in 127 games. He was second only to future Hall of Fame center fielder Willie Mays on the Giants in home runs, RBIs and OPS. He finished tenth in the National League in home runs. Sauer was named Comeback Player of the Year.

After the Giants moved to San Francisco in 1958, he was a part-time player, starting 64 of the 88 games in which he appeared that season, batting .250, with 12 home runs and 46 RBI in 236 at bats. In 1959, he had only 15 at bats in 13 games, all as a pinch hitter. His final hit as a professional baseball player was a home run against Art Ceccarelli and the Chicago Cubs on July 25. The Giants released him as a player on August 19 or August 25, 1959 to make room on their roster for Jackie Brandt. It is also reported that the 42-year old Sauer voluntarily retired on August 19.

In his 15-season MLB career, almost all of which came after he was 31-years old, Sauer was a .266 hitter with 288 home runs and 876 runs batted in. His 1,278 hits also included 200 doubles and 19 triples.

== Scouting and coaching ==
When Sauer retired on August 19, 1959 as a player, the San Francisco Giants immediately made him the team's outfield coach. After the 1959 season ended, the Giants made him a roving scout, also giving him a role in working with minor league players in the Giants' farm system. Sauer became a long-time scout and roving minor league batting instructor for the Giants. Giants owner Horace Stoneham said that Sauer had a good way with younger players because he could instill confidence in them without being a con man. In one of his first tasks with a younger player, he successfully spent hours in boosting the morale of future Hall of Fame Giant Willie McCovey at a difficult juncture in McCovey's career. Among other minor league hitting pupils, he helped make catcher Tom Haller a solid hitter and important part of the Giant's 1962 NL championship team.

In late May 1970, Sauer was made manager of the Triple-A Phoenix Giants of the Pacific Coast League after Phoenix manager Charlie Fox was given the Major League Giants' manager position. Sauer believed the Giants made him the interim manager because the team knew he had no ambition to become a Major League manager, and would focus on the players' development and needs, rather than his own self-interest. Sauer returned to his regular scouting and coaching duties after the season. In 1982, Sauer had scouted Barry Bonds in high school for the Giants, and he and Giants' manager Frank Robinson attempted to sign Bonds, who wanted $75,000. The Giants refused to pay Bonds that sum, and he signed elsewhere. A decade later, the Giants paid Bonds nearly $44 million to sign as a free agent.

== Legacy and honors ==
He is among the few players to win a Major League Most Valuable Player award on a second division team, and the first person to do so. He used a 40-ounce (1.13 kg) bat during his Major League career, reportedly the heaviest in baseball used at the time by any player. In a 1992 study by the Elias Sports Bureau comparing hitting production among MLB players after the age of thirty, Sauer's home run production was comparable to that of Hall of Famers Babe Ruth, Lou Gehrig and Willie Mays, among others.

He is a member of the Chicago Cubs Hall of Fame. In 1964 and/or 1996, he was named to the all-time Syracuse Chiefs' team. In 1998, he was selected to the Syracuse Baseball Wall of Fame, and the Syracuse SkyChiefs retired his No. 9. In 2008, he was inducted into the International League Hall of Fame.

Sauer and Hall of Fame catcher Johnny Bench are the only players in MLB history ever to have hit three home runs in a single game on two different occasions against the same pitcher. Bench's home runs came against Hall of Fame pitcher Steve Carlton in 1970 and 1973. Sauer did it 1950 and 1952 while with the Cubs, against Curt Simmons of the Philadelphia Phillies. He first hit three home runs against Simmons on August 28, 1950. The second time was on June 11, 1952, when he hit three one-run home runs against Simmons in a 3–2 win over the Phillies. Less than one month earlier, Simmons had struck Sauer out three times in a game between them.

Sauer was not a fast runner. In contrast to radio's Quiz Kids or the 1950 Phillies "Whiz Kids", according to Chicago columnist Mike Royko the 1950s Cubs had an outfield "that was so slow they were known as the Quicksand Kids." Sauer, Baumholtz and Kiner played left, center and right fields, respectively.

Sauer was well known for using smokeless tobacco, and it has often been reported that after he hit a home run, when he returned to his left field position, bleacher fans might shower him with packets of his favorite chew, Beech Nut tobacco. He would pocket some for himself, and store the rest in the ivy on the outfield wall to later share with his teammates. In 1954, the Cubs held a day to honor Sauer, and the fans in the "Sauer section" of the outfield gave him $6,000 worth of gifts.

== Personal life and death ==
Sauer’s younger brother Ed played 86 games for the Chicago Cubs from 1943 to 1945, and 103 combined games in 1949 between the St. Louis Cardinals and Boston Braves. Ed Sauer died in 1988.

Sauer’s son Hank Jr. played minor league baseball in the Giants’ farm system.

Sauer had been living in Millbrae, California when he died of a heart attack while playing golf in Burlingame, California, on August 24, 2001, at the age of 84. He was survived by his wife, three children and four grandchildren. His second child was born the same day his 1952 MVP award was announced.

== See also ==
- List of Major League Baseball career home run leaders
- List of Major League Baseball annual runs batted in leaders
