= 1957 Philadelphia Phillies season =

1957 Philadelphia Phillies
- League: National League
- Ballpark: Connie Mack Stadium
- City: Philadelphia
- Owners: R. R. M. Carpenter Jr.
- General managers: Roy Hamey
- Managers: Mayo Smith
- Television: WRCV; WFIL
- Radio: WIP (By Saam, Gene Kelly, Claude Haring)

The 1957 Philadelphia Phillies season was the 75th season in the history of the franchise, and the 20th season for the Philadelphia Phillies at Connie Mack Stadium.

== Offseason ==
- November 19, 1956: Del Ennis was traded by the Phillies to the St. Louis Cardinals for Rip Repulski and Bobby Morgan.

== Regular season ==
The Phillies integrated during the 1957 season. John Kennedy, the team's first black player, made his debut with the Phillies on April 22, 1957, at Roosevelt Stadium against the Brooklyn Dodgers.

=== Season standings ===
National League
Team	W	L	Pct.	GB	Home	Road
Milwaukee Braves	95	59	.617	—	45‍–‍32	50‍–‍27
St. Louis Cardinals	87	67	.565	8	42‍–‍35	45‍–‍32
Brooklyn Dodgers	84	70	.545	11	43‍–‍34	41‍–‍36
Cincinnati Redlegs	80	74	.519	15	45‍–‍32	35‍–‍42
Philadelphia Phillies	77	77	.500	18	38‍–‍39	39‍–‍38
New York Giants	69	85	.448	26	37‍–‍40	32‍–‍45
Pittsburgh Pirates	62	92	.403	33	36‍–‍41	26‍–‍51
Chicago Cubs	62	92	.403	33	31‍–‍46	31‍–‍46

=== Record vs. opponents ===
1957 National League record Sources:
Team	BRO	CHC	CIN	MIL	NYG	PHI	PIT	STL
Brooklyn	—	17–5	12–10	10–12	12–10	9–13	12–10	12–10
Chicago	5–17	—	7–15	9–13	9–13	8–14–1	12–10–1	12–10
Cincinnati	10–12	15–7	—	4–18	12–10	16–6	14–8	9–13
Milwaukee	12–10	13–9	18–4	—	13–9	12–10–1	16–6	11–11
New York	10–12	13–9	10–12	9–13	—	10–12	9–13	8–14
Philadelphia	13–9	14–8–1	6–16	10–12–1	12–10	—	13–9	9–13
Pittsburgh	10–12	10–12–1	8–14	6–16	13–9	9–13	—	6–16
St. Louis	10–12	10–12	13–9	11–11	14–8	13–9	16–6	—

=== Notable transactions ===
- April 5, 1957: Tim Harkness, Ron Negray, Elmer Valo, Mel Geho (minors), and $75,000 were traded by the Phillies to the Brooklyn Dodgers for Chico Fernández. The Phillies completed the deal by sending Ben Flowers to the Dodgers on April 8.
- June 17, 1957: Frank Baumholtz was released by the Phillies.
- June 26, 1957: Warren Hacker was selected off waivers by the Phillies from the Cincinnati Redlegs.

=== Game log ===
Legend
	Phillies win
	Phillies loss
	Phillies tie
	Postponement
**Bold**	Phillies team member

1957 Game Log
Overall Record: 77–77
April (5–7)

#	Date	Opponent	Score	Win	Loss	Save	Attendance	Record
1	April 16	Dodgers	6–7 (12)	Clem Labine (1–0)	**Robin Roberts** (0–1)	None	37,667	0–1
2	April 18	@ Giants	2–6	Rubén Gómez (1–0)	**Curt Simmons** (0–1)	None	8,585	0–2
3	April 20	@ Giants	6–5	**Harvey Haddix** (1–0)	Al Worthington (0–1)	**Bob Miller** (1)	8,875	1–2
4	April 21 (1)	@ Giants	1–2	Johnny Antonelli (1–1)	**Robin Roberts** (0–2)	None	see 2nd game	1–3
5	April 21 (2)	@ Giants	8–5	**Jack Sanford** (1–0)	Curt Barclay (0–1)	**Don Cardwell** (1)	14,230	2–3
6	April 22	@ Dodgers	1–5	Roger Craig (1–0)	**Jim Hearn** (0–1)	Clem Labine (2)	11,629	2–4
7	April 24	Pirates	8–5	**Curt Simmons** (1–1)	Bob Friend (1–2)	**Bob Miller** (2)	15,849	3–4
8	April 26	Giants	5–0	**Don Cardwell** (1–0)	Johnny Antonelli (1–2)	None	14,118	4–4
9	April 27	Giants	2–10	Rubén Gómez (3–0)	**Robin Roberts** (0–3)	None	7,577	4–5
10	April 28 (1)	Giants	11–2	**Jack Sanford** (2–0)	Al Worthington (0–2)	**Bob Miller** (3)	see 2nd game	5–5
11	April 28 (2)	Giants	7–8^{^{[a]}}	Curt Barclay (1–2)	**Jack Meyer** (0–1)	Marv Grissom (1)	19,482	5–6
12	April 30	Redlegs	3–6	Brooks Lawrence (2–1)	**Harvey Haddix** (1–1)	None	14,851	5–7

May (18–10–1)

#	Date	Opponent	Score	Win	Loss	Save	Attendance	Record
13	May 1	Redlegs	6–8 (16)	Warren Hacker (1–1)	**Turk Farrell** (0–1)	Hersh Freeman (1)	8,606	5–8
14	May 2	Cubs	4–2	**Robin Roberts** (1–3)	Dick Drott (0–3)	None	4,591	6–8
15	May 3	Cubs	9–6	**Turk Farrell** (1–1)	Jackie Collum (1–1)	**Jim Hearn** (1)	6,160	7–8
16	May 4	Cubs	5–2	**Jack Sanford** (3–0)	Jim Brosnan (0–1)	None	3,283	8–8
17	May 5 (1)	Cardinals	4–8	Lloyd Merritt (1–0)	**Bob Miller** (0–1)	None	see 2nd game	8–9
18	May 5 (2)	Cardinals	0–2	Sam Jones (2–0)	**Harvey Haddix** (1–2)	None	27,213	8–10
19	May 7	Braves	8–4	**Robin Roberts** (2–3)	Warren Spahn (4–1)	None	20,421	9–10
20	May 8	Braves	2–1	**Don Cardwell** (2–0)	Gene Conley (0–1)	None	17,739	10–10
21	May 10	@ Pirates	3–1	**Jack Sanford** (4–0)	Ron Kline (0–4)	None	10,027	11–10
22	May 11	@ Pirates	7–2	**Harvey Haddix** (2–2)	Bob Friend (2–3)	None	4,994	12–10
23	May 12 (1)	@ Pirates	6–2	**Curt Simmons** (2–1)	Luis Arroyo (0–4)	**Bob Miller** (4)	see 2nd game	13–10
24	May 12 (2)	@ Pirates	1–6	Vern Law (2–1)	**Robin Roberts** (2–4)	None	10,457	13–11
25	May 14	@ Redlegs	10–8	**Turk Farrell** (2–1)	Raúl Sánchez (2–1)	**Robin Roberts** (1)	9,829	14–11
26	May 15	@ Redlegs	2–7	Brooks Lawrence (4–1)	**Jack Sanford** (4–1)	None	12,442	14–12
27	May 16	@ Cardinals	0–5	Lindy McDaniel (2–1)	**Harvey Haddix** (2–3)	None	5,377	14–13
28	May 17	@ Cardinals	5–3	**Robin Roberts** (3–4)	Sam Jones (2–2)	None	9,367	15–13
29	May 18	@ Cardinals	7–5	**Curt Simmons** (3–1)	Lloyd Merritt (1–1)	None	5,232	16–13
–	May 19 (1)	@ Cubs	Postponed (rain); Makeup: September 17					
–	May 19 (2)	@ Cubs	Postponed (rain); Makeup: September 18					
30	May 21	@ Braves	1–1 (5)^{^{[b]}}	None	None	None	15,936	16–13–1
31	May 22	@ Braves	3–4 (13)	Juan Pizarro (2–2)	**Robin Roberts** (3–5)	None	21,775	16–14–1
32	May 24	Pirates	7–3	**Jack Sanford** (5–1)	Bob Friend (3–4)	**Turk Farrell** (1)	17,340	17–14–1
33	May 25	Pirates	8–6	**Harvey Haddix** (3–3)	Ron Kline (0–6)	**Turk Farrell** (2)	6,445	18–14–1
34	May 26 (1)	Pirates	5–13	Roy Face (1–3)	**Curt Simmons** (3–2)	None	see 2nd game	18–15–1
35	May 26 (2)	Pirates	6–3	**Don Cardwell** (3–0)	Luis Arroyo (1–5)	None	13,557	19–15–1
36	May 27	Dodgers	1–5	Don Drysdale (4–1)	**Robin Roberts** (3–6)	None	20,673	19–16–1
37	May 28	@ Giants	16–6	**Bob Miller** (1–1)	Johnny Antonelli (3–6)	None	4,977	20–16–1
38	May 29	@ Giants	7–5 (10)	**Robin Roberts** (4–6)	Marv Grissom (0–2)	None	2,216	21–16–1
39	May 30 (1)	@ Giants	2–1 (10)	**Curt Simmons** (4–2)	Rubén Gómez (6–3)	None	see 2nd game	22–16–1
40	May 30 (2)	@ Giants	1–8	Curt Barclay (3–3)	**Don Cardwell** (3–1)	None	19,887	22–17–1
41	May 31	Dodgers	2–1	**Robin Roberts** (5–6)	Don Drysdale (4–2)	None	24,381	23–17–1

June (13–17–1)

#	Date	Opponent	Score	Win	Loss	Save	Attendance	Record
42	June 1	Dodgers	3–0	**Jack Sanford** (6–1)	Roger Craig (1–2)	None	30,621	24–17–1
43	June 2	Dodgers	5–3	**Turk Farrell** (3–1)	Don Newcombe (4–5)	None	20,259	25–17–1
44	June 3	Dodgers	0–4	Johnny Podres (5–2)	**Don Cardwell** (3–2)	None	18,218	25–18–1
45	June 4	Redlegs	3–1	**Harvey Haddix** (4–3)	Brooks Lawrence (4–3)	None	20,759	26–18–1
46	June 5	Redlegs	2–4 (11)	Johnny Klippstein (2–4)	**Turk Farrell** (3–2)	None	15,771	26–19–1
47	June 6	Redlegs	6–2	**Robin Roberts** (6–6)	Don Gross (4–2)	None	27,307	27–19–1
48	June 7	Cubs	1–0	**Jack Sanford** (7–1)	Dave Hillman (0–2)	None	12,845	28–19–1
–	June 8	Cubs	Postponed (rain); Makeup: July 11 as a traditional double-header					
49	June 9 (1)	Cubs	3–7	Dick Drott (4–6)	**Robin Roberts** (6–7)	Turk Lown (3)	see 2nd game	28–20–1
50	June 9 (2)	Cubs	4–4^{^{[c]}}	None	None	None	17,375	28–20–2
51	June 11	Cardinals	2–5	Murry Dickson (3–2)	**Curt Simmons** (4–3)	None	23,888	28–21–2
52	June 12	Cardinals	0–4	Larry Jackson (8–2)	**Robin Roberts** (6–8)	None	22,749	28–22–2
53	June 13	Cardinals	8–1	**Jack Sanford** (8–1)	Vinegar Bend Mizell (1–4)	None	22,509	29–22–2
54	June 14	Braves	2–10	Warren Spahn (7–3)	**Don Cardwell** (3–3)	None	29,465	29–23–2
55	June 15	Braves	2–7	Bob Buhl (6–2)	**Harvey Haddix** (4–4)	None	12,178	29–24–2
56	June 16 (1)	Braves	2–3	Juan Pizarro (3–5)	**Bob Miller** (1–2)	None	see 2nd game	29–25–2
57	June 16 (2)	Braves	1–0	**Curt Simmons** (5–3)	Lew Burdette (5–3)	None	30,520	30–25–2
58	June 18	@ Cubs	7–6	**Jim Hearn** (1–1)	Dave Hillman (0–4)	None	6,092	31–25–2
59	June 19 (1)	@ Cubs	0–9	Dick Drott (6–6)	**Don Cardwell** (3–4)	None	see 2nd game	31–26–2
60	June 19 (2)	@ Cubs	3–4	Moe Drabowsky (4–5)	**Bob Miller** (1–3)	Turk Lown (5)	10,939	31–27–2
61	June 20	@ Cubs	7–2	**Harvey Haddix** (5–4)	Don Kaiser (2–5)	None	5,210	32–27–2
62	June 21	@ Braves	6–1	**Curt Simmons** (6–3)	Lew Burdette (5–4)	None	33,533	33–27–2
63	June 22	@ Braves	4–2	**Jack Sanford** (9–1)	Bob Trowbridge (2–1)	None	25,498	34–27–2
64	June 23 (1)	@ Braves	6–7	Bob Buhl (8–2)	**Robin Roberts** (6–9)	None	see 2nd game	34–28–2
65	June 23 (2)	@ Braves	3–7	Taylor Phillips (3–2)	**Seth Morehead** (0–1)	Bob Trowbridge (1)	36,037	34–29–2
66	June 24	@ Braves	10–4	**Harvey Haddix** (6–4)	Warren Spahn (7–5)	**Jim Hearn** (2)	15,600	35–29–2
67	June 26	@ Cardinals	11–3	**Curt Simmons** (7–3)	Lindy McDaniel (7–4)	None	14,192	36–29–2
68	June 27	@ Cardinals	4–6	Von McDaniel (3–0)	**Jack Sanford** (9–2)	Hoyt Wilhelm (7)	25,133	36–30–2
69	June 28	@ Redlegs	1–7	Hal Jeffcoat (7–5)	**Don Cardwell** (3–5)	None	16,848	36–31–2
70	June 29	@ Redlegs	3–8	Tom Acker (9–3)	**Robin Roberts** (6–10)	None	10,290	36–32–2
71	June 30 (1)	@ Redlegs	1–6	Brooks Lawrence (9–4)	**Curt Simmons** (7–4)	None	see 2nd game	36–33–2
72	June 30 (2)	@ Redlegs	2–6	Johnny Klippstein (3–7)	**Harvey Haddix** (6–5)	Brooks Lawrence (1)	32,584	36–34–2

July (20–11)

#	Date	Opponent	Score	Win	Loss	Save	Attendance	Record
73	July 1	@ Pirates	5–4	**Jim Hearn** (2–1)	Bob Smith (0–2)	**Seth Morehead** (1)	14,680	37–34–2
74	July 4 (1)	Giants	2–1	**Harvey Haddix** (7–5)	Rubén Gómez (10–6)	None	see 2nd game	38–34–2
75	July 4 (2)	Giants	6–2	**Curt Simmons** (8–4)	Stu Miller (3–4)	**Turk Farrell** (3)	30,442	39–34–2
76	July 5	@ Dodgers	5–6	Roger Craig (3–5)	**Robin Roberts** (6–11)	Johnny Podres (1)	13,324	39–35–2
77	July 6	@ Dodgers	9–4	**Jack Sanford** (10–2)	Don Drysdale (6–6)	None	8,939	40–35–2
78	July 7 (1)	@ Dodgers	2–1	**Warren Hacker** (4–2)	Sal Maglie (3–2)	**Turk Farrell** (4)	see 2nd game	41–35–2
79	July 7 (2)	@ Dodgers	5–3	**Jim Hearn** (3–1)	Clem Labine (3–5)	**Turk Farrell** (5)	16,805	42–35–2
–	July 9	**1957 Major League Baseball All-Star Game at Sportsman's Park in St. Louis**						
80	July 11 (1)	Cubs	1–0 (11)	**Harvey Haddix** (8–5)	Bob Rush (1–8)	None	see 2nd game	43–35–2
81	July 11 (2)	Cubs	3–1	**Jack Sanford** (11–2)	Don Elston (2–1)	None	25,897	44–35–2
82	July 12	Cubs	2–5	Jim Brosnan (1–3)	**Robin Roberts** (6–12)	None	11,526	44–36–2
83	July 13	Cubs	5–2	**Warren Hacker** (5–2)	Dick Drott (8–8)	**Turk Farrell** (6)	4,541	45–36–2
84	July 14 (1)	Cardinals	6–2	**Curt Simmons** (9–4)	Von McDaniel (4–1)	None	see 2nd game	46–36–2
85	July 14 (2)	Cardinals	11–4	**Jim Hearn** (4–1)	Larry Jackson (10–5)	None	26,451	47–36–2
86	July 15	Cardinals	6–2	**Jack Sanford** (12–2)	Vinegar Bend Mizell (3–7)	None	33,906	48–36–2
87	July 16	Braves	2–6	Warren Spahn (10–7)	**Harvey Haddix** (8–6)	None	24,846	48–37–2
88	July 17	Braves	3–10^{^{[d]}}	Lew Burdette (8–6)	**Jack Meyer** (0–2)	Don McMahon (3)	24,596	48–38–2
89	July 18	Braves	2–4	Bob Buhl (10–6)	**Curt Simmons** (9–5)	Don McMahon (4)	24,385	48–39–2
90	July 19	Redlegs	2–7	Joe Nuxhall (4–5)	**Jack Sanford** (12–3)	None	27,147	48–40–2
91	July 20	Redlegs	7–5	**Turk Farrell** (4–2)	Don Gross (4–6)	None	11,574	49–40–2
92	July 21 (1)	Redlegs	2–4	Brooks Lawrence (11–5)	**Robin Roberts** (6–13)	Hersh Freeman (7)	see 2nd game	49–41–2
93	July 21 (2)	Redlegs	4–6	Art Fowler (1–0)	**Harvey Haddix** (8–7)	Johnny Klippstein (1)	26,787	49–42–2
94	July 23	@ Braves	0–1	Bob Buhl (11–6)	**Curt Simmons** (9–6)	None	34,243	49–43–2
95	July 24	@ Braves	3–1	**Jack Sanford** (13–3)	Gene Conley (3–5)	None	32,412	50–43–2
96	July 25	@ Braves	5–3	**Robin Roberts** (7–13)	Warren Spahn (10–8)	**Turk Farrell** (7)	28,545	51–43–2
97	July 26	@ Cubs	3–1 (10)	**Warren Hacker** (6–2)	Bob Rush (1–11)	**Turk Farrell** (8)	8,957	52–43–2
98	July 27	@ Cubs	1–6	Jim Brosnan (2–4)	**Harvey Haddix** (8–8)	None	11,323	52–44–2
99	July 28 (1)	@ Cubs	3–2	**Curt Simmons** (10–6)	Tom Poholsky (1–6)	**Turk Farrell** (9)	see 2nd game	53–44–2
100	July 28 (2)	@ Cubs	7–1	**Jack Sanford** (14–3)	Dick Drott (9–9)	None	20,512	54–44–2
101	July 29	@ Cubs	6–0	**Robin Roberts** (8–13)	Don Elston (3–4)	None	3,637	55–44–2
102	July 30	@ Redlegs	8–5	**Bob Miller** (2–3)	Hersh Freeman (5–2)	None	15,813	56–44–2
103	July 31	@ Redlegs	5–6 (11)	Art Fowler (3–0)	**Bob Miller** (2–4)	None	12,721	56–45–2

August (9–18)

#	Date	Opponent	Score	Win	Loss	Save	Attendance	Record
104	August 1	@ Redlegs	3–4	Johnny Klippstein (5–10)	**Curt Simmons** (10–7)	Tom Acker (4)	11,720	56–46–2
105	August 2	@ Cardinals	4–5 (10)	Willard Schmidt (10–1)	**Bob Miller** (2–5)	None	21,898	56–47–2
106	August 3	@ Cardinals	1–3	Von McDaniel (6–2)	**Robin Roberts** (8–14)	Billy Muffett (1)	18,955	56–48–2
107	August 4 (1)	@ Cardinals	5–4 (12)	**Harvey Haddix** (9–8)	Larry Jackson (12–6)	None	see 2nd game	57–48–2
108	August 4 (2)	@ Cardinals	1–4	Lindy McDaniel (10–6)	**Warren Hacker** (6–3)	None	29,098	57–49–2
109	August 6	@ Pirates	3–5	Ron Kline (3–15)	**Jack Sanford** (14–4)	None	11,136	57–50–2
110	August 8	@ Pirates	6–3	**Curt Simmons** (11–7)	Vern Law (7–7)	**Bob Miller** (5)	5,238	58–50–2
111	August 9	@ Giants	2–6	Ray Crone (5–6)	**Robin Roberts** (8–15)	None	6,247	58–51–2
–	August 10	@ Giants	Postponed (rain); Makeup: August 11 as a traditional double-header					
112	August 11 (1)	@ Giants	0–5	Curt Barclay (7–7)	**Harvey Haddix** (9–9)	None	see 2nd game	58–52–2
113	August 11 (2)	@ Giants	2–0	**Jack Sanford** (15–4)	Johnny Antonelli (11–12)	None	13,880	59–52–2
114	August 13	Pirates	0–6	Bob Friend (8–15)	**Warren Hacker** (6–4)	None	14,129	59–53–2
115	August 14	Pirates	3–10	Vern Law (9–7)	**Curt Simmons** (11–8)	None	8,641	59–54–2
116	August 16	Giants	1–2	Stu Miller (5–8)	**Robin Roberts** (8–16)	None	16,733	59–55–2
117	August 17	Giants	3–1	**Jack Sanford** (16–4)	Rubén Gómez (13–10)	None	7,929	60–55–2
118	August 18 (1)	Giants	4–5	Mike McCormick (2–0)	**Warren Hacker** (6–5)	Marv Grissom (8)	see 2nd game	60–56–2
119	August 18 (2)	Giants	0–1	Al Worthington (8–8)	**Harvey Haddix** (9–10)	None	14,591	60–57–2
120	August 20 (1)	Cubs	2–1 (10)	**Turk Farrell** (5–2)	Moe Drabowsky (9–11)	None	see 2nd game	61–57–2
121	August 20 (2)	Cubs	2–5	Don Elston (4–5)	**Robin Roberts** (8–17)	None	15,129	61–58–2
122	August 22	Cardinals	5–6	Larry Jackson (13–6)	**Jack Sanford** (16–5)	Billy Muffett (3)	21,947	61–59–2
123	August 23	Cardinals	3–2	**Harvey Haddix** (10–10)	Vinegar Bend Mizell (5–10)	None	20,284	62–59–2
124	August 24	Cardinals	2–5	Herm Wehmeier (6–6)	**Curt Simmons** (11–9)	None	11,049	62–60–2
125	August 25	Braves	3–7	Warren Spahn (16–8)	**Robin Roberts** (8–18)	None	14,051	62–61–2
126	August 26	Braves	4–3	**Turk Farrell** (6–2)	Ernie Johnson (6–2)	None	21,397	63–61–2
127	August 27	Redlegs	2–5	Joe Nuxhall (8–7)	**Don Cardwell** (3–6)	None	15,520	63–62–2
128	August 28	Redlegs	5–6	Brooks Lawrence (12–11)	**Curt Simmons** (11–10)	Johnny Klippstein (2)	15,134	63–63–2
129	August 30	Pirates	4–3	**Jack Sanford** (17–5)	Vern Law (10–8)	None	8,157	64–63–2
130	August 31	Pirates	7–1	**Don Cardwell** (4–6)	Bob Friend (10–17)	None	5,141	65–63–2

September (12–14)

#	Date	Opponent	Score	Win	Loss	Save	Attendance	Record
131	September 1 (1)	Pirates	11–3	**Robin Roberts** (9–18)	Bob Purkey (10–13)	None	see 2nd game	66–63–2
132	September 1 (2)	Pirates	3–6	Whammy Douglas (2–2)	**Curt Simmons** (11–11)	Roy Face (7)	11,294	66–64–2
133	September 2 (1)	@ Dodgers	10–4	**Warren Hacker** (7–5)	Danny McDevitt (6–2)	None	see 2nd game	67–64–2
134	September 2 (2)	@ Dodgers	7–4	**Jim Hearn** (5–1)	Roger Craig (5–8)	None	18,895	68–64–2
135	September 3	@ Dodgers	3–2 (12)	**Turk Farrell** (7–2)	Don Drysdale (14–8)	**Bob Miller** (6)	10,190	69–64–2
136	September 4	Dodgers	3–12	Don Newcombe (11–11)	**Don Cardwell** (4–7)	Ed Roebuck (6)	17,615	69–65–2
137	September 5	Dodgers	1–3	Carl Erskine (4–2)	**Robin Roberts** (9–19)	Ed Roebuck (7)	18,087	69–66–2
138	September 6	@ Pirates	2–3	Ron Kline (7–15)	**Harvey Haddix** (10–11)	None	6,915	69–67–2
139	September 7	@ Pirates	3–6	Red Swanson (3–2)	**Jack Sanford** (17–6)	Roy Face (9)	4,612	69–68–2
140	September 8 (1)	@ Pirates	7–4	**Turk Farrell** (8–2)	Bob Purkey (10–14)	**Robin Roberts** (2)	see 2nd game	70–68–2
141	September 8 (2)	@ Pirates	2–6	Bob Smith (1–3)	**Warren Hacker** (7–6)	None	12,021	70–69–2
142	September 10	@ Cardinals	3–4 (14)	Lindy McDaniel (14–8)	**Robin Roberts** (9–20)	None	10,997	70–70–2
143	September 11	@ Cardinals	6–14	Herm Wehmeier (9–6)	**Harvey Haddix** (10–12)	Hoyt Wilhelm (11)	10,674	70–71–2
144	September 13	@ Redlegs	7–8	Tom Acker (10–5)	**Jack Sanford** (17–7)	Johnny Klippstein (3)	6,805	70–72–2
145	September 14	@ Redlegs	5–0	**Robin Roberts** (10–20)	Brooks Lawrence (15–12)	None	4,527	71–72–2
146	September 15	@ Braves	3–2 (10)	**Turk Farrell** (9–2)	Warren Spahn (19–10)	None	34,920	72–72–2
147	September 16	@ Braves	1–5	Bob Buhl (17–6)	**Harvey Haddix** (10–13)	None	20,929	72–73–2
148	September 17	@ Cubs	1–7	Moe Drabowsky (11–14)	**Jack Sanford** (17–8)	None	1,727	72–74–2
149	September 18	@ Cubs	4–6	Dick Drott (15–11)	**Robin Roberts** (10–21)	Don Elston (6)	2,094	72–75–2
150	September 20	@ Dodgers	3–2	**Turk Farrell** (10–2)	Carl Erskine (5–3)	**Jim Hearn** (3)	6,749	73–75–2
151	September 21	@ Dodgers	3–2	**Jack Sanford** (18–8)	Johnny Podres (12–9)	**Turk Farrell** (10)	5,118	74–75–2
152	September 22	@ Dodgers	3–7	Don Drysdale (17–9)	**Robin Roberts** (10–22)	None	6,662	74–76–2
153	September 24	Giants	5–0	**Curt Simmons** (12–11)	Curt Barclay (9–9)	None	7,019	75–76–2
154	September 27	Dodgers	3–2	**Jack Sanford** (19–8)	Bill Harris (0–1)	None	11,595	76–76–2
155	September 28	Dodgers	4–8	Ed Roebuck (8–2)	**Don Cardwell** (4–8)	Johnny Podres (3)	5,797	76–77–2
156	September 29	Dodgers	2–1	**Seth Morehead** (1–1)	Roger Craig (6–9)	None	9,886	77–77–2

^{^[a]}The second game on April 28 was suspended (Sunday curfew) in the bottom of the seventh inning with the score 7–8 and was completed August 16, 1957.
^{^[b]}The May 21 game was called after 5 1/2 innings (reduced to 5 innings) with the score tied 1–1. It was replayed from the start on June 24, 1957.
^{^[c]}The second game on June 9 was suspended (Sunday curfew) in the top of the tenth inning with the score 4–4. Because at least nine innings had been completed, the game was replayed from the beginning on August 20, 1957.
^{^[d]}The July 17 game was protested by the Phillies between the first and second innings. The protest was later denied.

=== Roster ===
1957 Philadelphia Phillies
**Roster**
**Pitchers**: 46 Don Cardwell; 43 Turk Farrell; 49 Warren Hacker; 20 Harvey Haddix; 22 Jim Hearn; 42 Jack Meyer; 19 Bob Miller; 44 Seth Morehead; 33 Tom Qualters; 36 Robin Roberts; 26 Saul Rogovin; 39 Jack Sanford; 28 Curt Simmons	**Catchers**: 35 Joe Lonnett; 29 Stan Lopata; 21 Andy Seminick; **Infielders**: 12 Marv Blaylock; 5 Ed Bouchee; 45 Chico Fernández; 2 Granny Hamner; 4 Solly Hemus; 6 Willie Jones; 7 Ted Kazanski; 8 John Kennedy; 3 Bobby Morgan; 17 Roy Smalley Jr.	**Outfielders**: 9 Harry Anderson; 1 Richie Ashburn; 10 Bob Bowman; 50 Chuck Harmon; 3 Don Landrum; 14 Rip Repulski; **Other batters**: 16 Frank Baumholtz; 50 Glen Gorbous; 26 Ron Northey	**Manager**: 24 Mayo Smith; **Coaches**: 11 Benny Bengough; 40 Maje McDonnell; 32 Wally Moses; 21 Andy Seminick; 31 Whit Wyatt

== Player stats ==
= Indicates team leader

=== Batting ===
==== Starters by position ====
Note: Pos = Position; G = Games played; AB = At bats; H = Hits; Avg. = Batting average; HR = Home runs; RBI = Runs batted in

Pos	Player	G	AB	H	Avg.	HR	RBI
C	Stan Lopata	116	388	92	.237	18	67
1B	Ed Bouchee	154	574	168	.293	17	76
2B	Granny Hamner	133	502	114	.227	10	62
SS	Chico Fernández	149	500	131	.262	5	51
3B	Willie Jones	133	440	96	.218	9	47
LF	Harry Anderson	118	400	107	.268	17	61
CF	Richie Ashburn	156	626	186	.297	0	33
RF	Rip Repulski	134	516	134	.260	20	68

==== Other batters ====
Note: G = Games played; AB = At bats; H = Hits; Avg. = Batting average; HR = Home runs; RBI = Runs batted in

Player	G	AB	H	Avg.	HR	RBI
Bob Bowman	99	237	63	.266	6	23
Ted Kazanski	62	185	49	.265	3	11
Joe Lonnett	67	160	27	.169	5	15
Solly Hemus	70	108	20	.185	0	5
Chuck Harmon	57	86	22	.256	0	5
Roy Smalley Jr.	28	31	5	.161	1	1
Ron Northey	33	26	7	.269	1	5
Marv Blaylock	37	26	4	.154	2	4
Andy Seminick	8	11	1	.091	0	0
Don Landrum	2	7	1	.143	0	0
Glen Gorbous	3	2	1	.500	0	1
Frank Baumholtz	2	2	0	.000	0	0
John Kennedy	5	2	0	.000	0	0
Bobby Morgan	2	0	0	----	0	0

=== Pitching ===
= Indicates league leader

==== Starting pitchers ====
Note: G = Games pitched; IP = Innings pitched; W = Wins; L = Losses; ERA = Earned run average; SO = Strikeouts

Player	G	IP	W	L	ERA	SO
Robin Roberts	39	249.2	10	22	4.07	128
Jack Sanford	33	236.2	19	8	3.08	188
Curt Simmons	32	212.0	12	11	3.44	92
Harvey Haddix	27	170.2	10	13	4.06	136

==== Other pitchers ====
Note: G = Games pitched; IP = Innings pitched; W = Wins; L = Losses; ERA = Earned run average; SO = Strikeouts

Player	G	IP	W	L	ERA	SO
Don Cardwell	30	128.1	4	8	4.91	92
Warren Hacker	20	74.0	4	4	4.50	33

==== Relief pitchers ====
Note: G = Games pitched; W = Wins; L = Losses; SV = Saves; ERA = Earned run average; SO = Strikeouts

Player	G	W	L	SV	ERA	SO
Turk Farrell	52	10	2	10	2.38	54
Jim Hearn	36	5	1	3	3.65	46
Seth Morehead	34	1	1	1	3.68	36
Bob Miller	32	2	5	6	2.69	12
Jack Meyer	19	0	2	0	5.73	34
Tom Qualters	6	0	0	0	7.36	6
Saul Rogovin	4	0	0	0	9.00	0
Granny Hamner	1	0	0	0	0.00	1

== Awards and honors ==
All-Star Game

- Curt Simmons, Pitcher, Starter (third career All-Star appearance)
- Jack Sanford, Pitcher, Reserve (first career All-Star appearance).

== Farm system ==
Level	Team	League	Manager
AAA	Miami Marlins	International League	Don Osborn
AA	Tulsa Oilers	Texas League	Al Widmar
A	Schenectady Blue Jays	Eastern League	Dick Carter
B	High Point-Thomasville Hi-Toms	Carolina League	Frank Lucchesi
B	Lewiston Broncos	Northwest League	Hillis Layne
C	Salt Lake City Bees	Pioneer League	Cliff Dapper
D	Johnson City Phillies	Appalachian League	Ben Taylor
D	Tampa Tarpons	Florida State League	Charlie Gassaway
D	Moultrie/Brunswick Phillies	Georgia–Florida League	Benny Zientara
D	Olean Oilers	New York–Penn League	Paul Owens

LEAGUE CHAMPIONS: Tampa
Moultrie franchise transferred to Brunswick, June 1, 1957
