= 1957 Chicago Cubs season =

1957 Chicago Cubs
- League: National League
- Ballpark: Wrigley Field
- City: Chicago
- Record: 62–92 (.403)
- League place: 7th
- Owners: Philip K. Wrigley
- General managers: John Holland
- Managers: Bob Scheffing
- Television: WGN-TV (Jack Brickhouse, Vince Lloyd)
- Radio: WIND (Milo Hamilton, Jack Quinlan, Gene Elston)

The 1957 Chicago Cubs season was the 86th season of the Chicago Cubs franchise, the 82nd in the National League, and the 42nd at Wrigley Field. The Cubs tied with the Pittsburgh Pirates for seventh in the National League with a record of 62–92–2 (.403 winning percentage).

== Offseason ==
- November 13, 1956: Don Hoak, Warren Hacker, and Pete Whisenant were traded by the Cubs to the Cincinnati Redlegs for Ray Jablonski and Elmer Singleton.
- December 11, 1956: Eddie Miksis, Jim Davis, Sam Jones, and Hobie Landrith were traded by the Cubs to the St. Louis Cardinals for Tom Poholsky, Jackie Collum, Ray Katt, and Wally Lammers (minors).
- December 11, 1956: The Cubs traded a player to be named later to the New York Yankees for Charlie Silvera and cash. The Cubs completed the deal by sending Harry Chiti to the Yankees on December 14.
- Prior to 1957 season: Lou Jackson was signed as an amateur free agent by the Cubs.

== Regular season ==
=== Season standings ===
National League
Team	W	L	Pct.	GB	Home	Road
Milwaukee Braves	95	59	.617	—	45‍–‍32	50‍–‍27
St. Louis Cardinals	87	67	.565	8	42‍–‍35	45‍–‍32
Brooklyn Dodgers	84	70	.545	11	43‍–‍34	41‍–‍36
Cincinnati Redlegs	80	74	.519	15	45‍–‍32	35‍–‍42
Philadelphia Phillies	77	77	.500	18	38‍–‍39	39‍–‍38
New York Giants	69	85	.448	26	37‍–‍40	32‍–‍45
Pittsburgh Pirates	62	92	.403	33	36‍–‍41	26‍–‍51
Chicago Cubs	62	92	.403	33	31‍–‍46	31‍–‍46

=== Record vs. opponents ===
1957 National League record Sources:
Team	BRO	CHC	CIN	MIL	NYG	PHI	PIT	STL
Brooklyn	—	17–5	12–10	10–12	12–10	9–13	12–10	12–10
Chicago	5–17	—	7–15	9–13	9–13	8–14–1	12–10–1	12–10
Cincinnati	10–12	15–7	—	4–18	12–10	16–6	14–8	9–13
Milwaukee	12–10	13–9	18–4	—	13–9	12–10–1	16–6	11–11
New York	10–12	13–9	10–12	9–13	—	10–12	9–13	8–14
Philadelphia	13–9	14–8–1	6–16	10–12–1	12–10	—	13–9	9–13
Pittsburgh	10–12	10–12–1	8–14	6–16	13–9	9–13	—	6–16
St. Louis	10–12	10–12	13–9	11–11	14–8	13–9	16–6	—

=== Notable transactions ===
- April 16, 1957: Ray Katt and Ray Jablonski were traded by the Cubs to the New York Giants for Dick Littlefield and Bob Lennon.
- April 20, 1957: Jim King was traded by the Cubs to the St. Louis Cardinals for Bobby Del Greco and Ed Mayer.
- May 1, 1957: Dee Fondy and Gene Baker were traded by the Cubs to the Pittsburgh Pirates for Dale Long and Lee Walls.
- May 23, 1957: Jackie Collum and Vito Valentinetti were traded by the Cubs to the Brooklyn Dodgers for Don Elston.
- June 8, 1957: Chuck Tanner was claimed on waivers by the Cubs from the Milwaukee Braves.
- September 10, 1957: Bobby Del Greco was purchased from the Cubs by the New York Yankees.

=== Roster ===
1957 Chicago Cubs
Roster
Pitchers: 32 Bob Anderson; 15 John Briggs; 42 Jim Brosnan; 15 Jackie Collum; 26 Moe Drabowsky; 18 Dick Drott; 36 Don Elston; 53 Dave Hillman; 28 Glen Hobbie; 45 Don Kaiser; 34 Dick Littlefield; 31 Turk Lown; 40 Ed Mayer; 29 Tom Poholsky; 17 Bob Rush; 20 Elmer Singleton; 57 Vito Valentinetti	Catchers: 1 Jim Fanning; 9 Gordon Massa; 30 Cal Neeman; 8 Charlie Silvera; Infielders: 7 Bobby Adams; 37 Gene Baker; 14 Ernie Banks; 40 Dee Fondy; 4 Johnny Goryl; 23 Jerry Kindall; 6,39 Jack Littrell; 27 Dale Long; 39 Ed Mickelson; 12 Bobby Morgan; 12 Ed Winceniak; 7 Casey Wise	Outfielders: 3 Jim Bolger; 5 Bobby Del Greco; 5 Frank Ernaga; 37 Eddie Haas; 9 Bob Lennon; 43 Walt Moryn; 11 Bob Speake; 39 Chuck Tanner; 2 Lee Walls; 16 Bob Will; Other batters: 48 Jim Woods	Manager: 25 Bob Scheffing; Coaches: 33 Fred Fitzsimmons; 22 Ray Mueller; 52 George Myatt

== Player stats ==
=== Batting ===
==== Starters by position ====
Note: Pos = Position; G = Games played; AB = At bats; H = Hits; Avg. = Batting average; HR = Home runs; RBI = Runs batted in

Pos	Player	G	AB	H	Avg.	HR	RBI
C	Cal Neeman	122	415	107	.258	10	39
1B	Dale Long	123	397	121	.305	21	62
2B	Bobby Morgan	125	425	88	.207	5	27
SS	Ernie Banks	156	594	169	.285	43	102
3B	Bobby Adams	60	187	47	.251	1	10
LF	Lee Walls	117	366	88	.240	6	33
CF	Bob Speake	129	418	97	.232	16	50
RF	Walt Moryn	149	568	164	.289	19	88

==== Other batters ====
Note: G = Games played; AB = At bats; H = Hits; Avg. = Batting average; HR = Home runs; RBI = Runs batted in

Player	G	AB	H	Avg.	HR	RBI
Chuck Tanner	95	318	91	.286	7	42
Jim Bolger	112	273	75	.275	5	29
Jerry Kindall	72	181	29	.160	6	12
Jack Littrell	61	153	29	.190	1	13
Bob Will	70	112	25	.223	1	10
Casey Wise	43	106	19	.179	0	7
Jim Fanning	47	89	16	.180	0	4
Charlie Silvera	26	53	11	.208	0	2
Dee Fondy	11	51	16	.314	0	2
Ed Winceniak	17	50	12	.240	1	8
Gene Baker	12	44	11	.250	1	10
Bobby Del Greco	20	40	8	.200	0	3
Johnny Goryl	9	38	8	.211	0	1
Frank Ernaga	20	35	11	.314	2	7
Eddie Haas	14	24	5	.208	0	4
Bob Lennon	9	21	3	.143	1	3
Gordon Massa	6	15	7	.467	0	3
Ed Mickelson	6	12	0	.000	0	1
Jim Woods	2	0	0	----	0	0

=== Pitching ===
==== Starting pitchers ====
Note: G = Games pitched; IP = Innings pitched; W = Wins; L = Losses; ERA = Earned run average; SO = Strikeouts

Player	G	IP	W	L	ERA	SO
Moe Drabowski	36	239.2	13	15	3.53	170
Dick Drott	38	229.0	15	11	3.58	170
Bob Rush	31	205.1	6	16	4.38	103

==== Other pitchers ====
Note: G = Games pitched; IP = Innings pitched; W = Wins; L = Losses; ERA = Earned run average; SO = Strikeouts

Player	G	IP	W	L	ERA	SO
Don Elston	39	144.0	6	7	3.56	102
Dave Hillman	32	103.1	6	11	4.35	53
Tom Poholsky	28	84.0	1	7	4.93	28
Don Kaiser	20	72.0	2	6	5.00	23
Elmer Singleton	5	13.1	0	1	6.75	6
Ed Mayer	3	7.2	0	0	5.87	3

==== Relief pitchers ====
Note: G = Games pitched; W = Wins; L = Losses; SV = Saves; ERA = Earned run average; SO = Strikeouts

Player	G	W	L	SV	ERA	SO
Turk Lown	67	5	7	12	3.77	51
Dick Littlefield	48	2	3	4	5.35	51
Jim Brosnan	41	5	5	0	3.38	73
Vito Valentinetti	9	0	0	0	2.25	8
Jackie Collum	9	1	1	1	6.75	7
Bob Anderson	8	0	1	0	7.71	7
John Briggs	3	0	1	0	12.46	1
Glen Hobbie	2	0	0	0	10.38	3

== Farm system ==
Level	Team	League	Manager
Open	Portland Beavers	Pacific Coast League	Bill Sweeney, Frank Carswell and Bill Posedel
AA	Memphis Chicks	Southern Association	Lou Klein
AA	Fort Worth Cats	Texas League	Lee Handley
A	Des Moines Bruins	Western League	Lou Stringer and Hersh Martin
B	Burlington Bees	Illinois–Indiana–Iowa League	Ken Raffensberger
C	Bakersfield Bears	California League	Dick Wilson and Babe Herman
C	Lafayette Bulls	Evangeline League	Walt Dixon
C	Magic Valley Cowboys	Pioneer League	Burdette Thurlby and Walt Dixon
D	Pulaski Cubs	Appalachian League	Vedie Himsl, Jim Bottomley, Halley Wilson and Burdette Thurlby
D	Paris Lakers	Midwest League	Verlon Walker
D	Ponca City Cubs	Sooner State League	Don Biebel

Lafayette franchise folded, June 20, 1957
