= 1957 Cincinnati Redlegs season =

1957 Cincinnati Redlegs
- League: National League
- Ballpark: Crosley Field
- City: Cincinnati
- Owners: Powel Crosley Jr.
- General managers: Gabe Paul
- Managers: Birdie Tebbetts
- Television: WLW (George Bryson)
- Radio: WKRC (Waite Hoyt, Jack Moran)

The 1957 Cincinnati Redlegs season consisted of the Redlegs finishing in fourth place in the National League, with a record of 80–74, 15 games behind the NL and World Series Champion Milwaukee Braves. The Redlegs were managed by Birdie Tebbetts and played their home games at Crosley Field, where they attracted 1,070,850 fans, fourth in the eight-team league.

== Offseason ==
- November 13, 1956: Ray Jablonski and Elmer Singleton were traded by the Redlegs to the Chicago Cubs for Don Hoak, Warren Hacker, and Pete Whisenant.
- December 3, 1956: Maury Wills was drafted by the Redlegs from the Brooklyn Dodgers in the 1956 minor league draft.

== Regular season ==
Just as in the 1956 season, the Reds were once again in first place at mid-season when, fan voting for the 1957 All-Star Game starting players determined that no fewer than seven Redleg players (Ed Bailey, Johnny Temple, Roy McMillan, Don Hoak, Frank Robinson, Gus Bell and Wally Post) had been elected to start in the All-Star Game, a record that still stands. The only non-Redleg elected for the National League was St. Louis Cardinal first baseman Stan Musial, who had only narrowly beaten his Reds counterpart George Crowe. Although Cincinnati had the second-best offense in the majors (they would score 747 runs that year, surpassed only by Milwaukee), most baseball observers felt they obviously did not deserve seven starters in the All-Star Game.

An investigation was launched by Commissioner Ford Frick, which found that the majority of the ballots cast had come from Cincinnati; in fact, The Cincinnati Times-Star newspaper had printed up pre-marked ballots with the Cincinnati starting lineup on them, and distributed them with each day's paper to make it easy for Redlegs fans to vote often for their favorite players. Meanwhile, Burger Beer, a Redlegs sponsor, had printed 250,000 similar ballots and distributed them to local bars, and stories emerged of bartenders refusing to serve alcohol to customers until they filled out a ballot.

Subsequently, Frick suspended fans' voting rights, and appointed Willie Mays of the New York Giants and Hank Aaron of the Milwaukee Braves to substitute for Bell and Post. Bell was kept as a reserve (he would bat for Redlegs teammate Robinson in the seventh and slap a two-RBI double), while Post was injured and would have been unable to play in any event. Hoak and McMillan were each dismissed from the game after a single at-bat, in favour of future Hall of Famers Eddie Mathews and Ernie Banks, respectively. Temple batted twice before giving way to another future Cooperstown resident, Red Schoendienst. (Bailey caught the whole game, but was pinch-hit for in the bottom of the ninth.)

The Reds faltered after the All-Star break and dropped to fourth place in the season final standings.

=== Season standings ===
National League
Team	W	L	Pct.	GB	Home	Road
Milwaukee Braves	95	59	.617	—	45‍–‍32	50‍–‍27
St. Louis Cardinals	87	67	.565	8	42‍–‍35	45‍–‍32
Brooklyn Dodgers	84	70	.545	11	43‍–‍34	41‍–‍36
Cincinnati Redlegs	80	74	.519	15	45‍–‍32	35‍–‍42
Philadelphia Phillies	77	77	.500	18	38‍–‍39	39‍–‍38
New York Giants	69	85	.448	26	37‍–‍40	32‍–‍45
Pittsburgh Pirates	62	92	.403	33	36‍–‍41	26‍–‍51
Chicago Cubs	62	92	.403	33	31‍–‍46	31‍–‍46

=== Record vs. opponents ===
1957 National League record Sources:
Team	BRO	CHC	CIN	MIL	NYG	PHI	PIT	STL
Brooklyn	—	17–5	12–10	10–12	12–10	9–13	12–10	12–10
Chicago	5–17	—	7–15	9–13	9–13	8–14–1	12–10–1	12–10
Cincinnati	10–12	15–7	—	4–18	12–10	16–6	14–8	9–13
Milwaukee	12–10	13–9	18–4	—	13–9	12–10–1	16–6	11–11
New York	10–12	13–9	10–12	9–13	—	10–12	9–13	8–14
Philadelphia	13–9	14–8–1	6–16	10–12–1	12–10	—	13–9	9–13
Pittsburgh	10–12	10–12–1	8–14	6–16	13–9	9–13	—	6–16
St. Louis	10–12	10–12	13–9	11–11	14–8	13–9	16–6	—

=== Notable transactions ===
- June 26, 1957: Warren Hacker was selected off waivers from the Redlegs by the Philadelphia Phillies.

=== Roster ===
1957 Cincinnati Redlegs
Roster
Pitchers: 40 Tom Acker; 36 Vicente Amor; 51 Art Fowler; 30 Hersh Freeman; 31 Don Gross; 36 Warren Hacker; 47 Jay Hook; 42 Hal Jeffcoat; 19 Bill Kennedy; 35 Johnny Klippstein; 46 Brooks Lawrence; 39 Joe Nuxhall; 34 Claude Osteen; 38 Bud Podbielan; 33 Charlie Rabe; 32 Raúl Sanchéz; 45 Dave Skaugstad	Catchers: 6 Ed Bailey; 7 Smoky Burgess; 8 Dutch Dotterer; Infielders: 14 Rocky Bridges; 15 George Crowe; 19 Bobby Durnbaugh; 21 Curt Flood; 10 Alex Grammas; 17 Bobby Henrich; 12 Don Hoak; 18 Ted Kluszewski; 11 Roy McMillan; 16 Johnny Temple	Outfielders: 25 Gus Bell; 24 Jerry Lynch; 28 Wally Post; 20 Frank Robinson; 27 Art Schult; 27 Joe Taylor; 22 Bob Thurman; 29 Pete Whisenant; Other batters: 9 Don Pavletich	Manager: 1 Birdie Tebbetts; Coaches: 4 Jimmy Dykes; 3 Tom Ferrick; 2 Frank McCormick

== Player stats ==
= Indicates team leader

=== Batting ===
==== Starters by position ====
Note: Pos = Position; G = Games played; AB = At bats; H = Hits; Avg. = Batting average; HR = Home runs; RBI = Runs batted in

Pos	Player	G	AB	H	Avg.	HR	RBI
C	Ed Bailey	122	391	102	.261	20	48
1B	George Crowe	133	494	134	.271	31	92
2B	Johnny Temple	145	557	158	.284	0	37
SS	Roy McMillan	151	448	122	.272	1	55
3B	Don Hoak	149	529	155	.293	19	89
LF	Frank Robinson	150	611	197	.322	29	75
CF	Gus Bell	121	510	149	.292	13	61
RF	Wally Post	134	467	114	.244	20	74

==== Other batters ====
Note: G = Games played; AB = At bats; H = Hits; Avg. = Batting average; HR = Home runs; RBI = Runs batted in

Player	G	AB	H	Avg.	HR	RBI
Smoky Burgess	90	205	58	.283	14	39
Bob Thurman	74	190	47	.247	16	40
Ted Kluszewski	69	127	34	.268	6	21
Jerry Lynch	67	124	32	.258	4	13
Joe Taylor	33	107	28	.262	4	9
Alex Grammas	73	99	30	.303	0	8
Pete Whisenant	67	90	19	.211	5	11
Art Schult	21	34	9	.265	0	4
Dutch Dotterer	4	12	1	.083	0	2
Bobby Henrich	29	10	2	.200	0	1
Curt Flood	3	3	1	.333	1	1
Rocky Bridges	5	1	0	.000	0	0
Bobby Durnbaugh	2	1	0	.000	0	0
Don Pavletich	1	1	0	.000	0	0

=== Pitching ===
==== Starting pitchers ====
Note: G = Games pitched; IP = Innings pitched; W = Wins; L = Losses; ERA = Earned run average; SO = Strikeouts

Player	G	IP	W	L	ERA	SO
Hal Jeffcoat	37	207.0	12	13	4.52	63
Joe Nuxhall	39	174.1	10	10	4.75	99

==== Other pitchers ====
Note: G = Games pitched; IP = Innings pitched; W = Wins; L = Losses; ERA = Earned run average; SO = Strikeouts

Player	G	IP	W	L	ERA	SO
Brooks Lawrence	49	250.1	16	13	3.52	121
Don Gross	43	148.1	7	9	4.31	73
Johnny Klippstein	46	146.0	8	11	5.05	99
Art Fowler	33	87.2	3	0	6.47	45
Warren Hacker	15	43.1	3	2	5.19	18
Vicente Amor	9	27.1	1	2	5.93	9
Bud Podbielan	5	16.0	0	1	6.19	13
Jay Hook	3	10.0	0	1	4.50	6
Charlie Rabe	2	8.1	0	1	2.16	6

==== Relief pitchers ====
Note: G = Games pitched; W = Wins; L = Losses; SV = Saves; ERA = Earned run average; SO = Strikeouts

Player	G	W	L	SV	ERA	SO
Hersh Freeman	52	7	2	8	4.52	36
Tom Acker	49	10	5	4	4.97	67
Raúl Sánchez	38	3	2	5	4.76	37
Bill Kennedy	8	0	2	3	6.39	8
Claude Osteen	3	0	0	0	2.25	3
Dave Skaugstad	2	0	0	0	1.59	4

== Awards and honors ==
All-Star Game

- Ed Bailey, Catcher, Starter
- Johnny Temple, Second Base, Starter
- Don Hoak, Third Base, Starter
- Roy McMillan, Shortstop, Starter
- Frank Robinson, Outfield, Starter
- Gus Bell, Outfield, Reserve

== Farm system ==
Level	Team	League	Manager
Open	Seattle Rainiers	Pacific Coast League	Lefty O'Doul
AAA	Havana Sugar Kings	International League	Nap Reyes
AA	Nashville Vols	Southern Association	Dick Sisler
A	Savannah Redlegs	Sally League	Jimmy Brown
B	Port Arthur/Temple Redlegs	Big State League	Al Barillari
B	Wenatchee Chiefs	Northwest League	Don Lundberg and Bert Haas
B	Clovis Pioneers	Southwestern League	Bert Haas
C	Visalia Redlegs	California League	Bruce Edwards
C	Wausau Lumberjacks	Northern League	Walt Novick
D	Graceville Oilers	Alabama–Florida League	Bob Wellman and Charley Grant
D	Palatka Redlegs	Florida State League	Johnny Vander Meer
D	Hornell Redlegs	New York–Penn League	Dave Bristol

LEAGUE CO-CHAMPIONS: Graceville
Port Arthur franchise transferred to Temple, May 30, 1957, then folded, August 20; Clovis franchise folded, June 16; Hornell replaced disbanded Bradford franchise in mid-season and began play May 28
