= 1957 St. Louis Cardinals season =

Major League Baseball season

1957 St. Louis Cardinals
- League: National League
- Ballpark: Busch Stadium I
- City: St. Louis, Missouri
- Record: 87–67 (.565)
- League place: 2nd
- Owners: August "Gussie" Busch
- General managers: Frank Lane
- Managers: Fred Hutchinson
- Television: KTVI
- Radio: KMOX (Harry Caray, Jack Buck, Joe Garagiola)
- Stats: ESPN.com; Baseball Reference

The 1957 St. Louis Cardinals season was the team's 76th season in St. Louis, Missouri and its 66th season in the National League. The Cardinals went 87–67 during the season and finished second in the National League, eight games behind the Milwaukee Braves.

== Offseason ==
- October 16, 1956: Hank Sauer was released by the Cardinals.
- November 27, 1956: Charlie Peete, 27, was killed in a plane crash, along with his wife and three children, while flying to Venezuela to play Winter League ball. He was projected to be the Cardinals' starting center fielder in 1957.
- December 3, 1956: Bob Smith was drafted by the Cardinals from the Boston Red Sox in the 1956 rule 5 draft.
- December 11, 1956: Tom Poholsky, Jackie Collum, Ray Katt, and Wally Lammers (minors) were traded by the Cardinals to the Chicago Cubs for Eddie Miksis, Jim Davis, Sam Jones, and Hobie Landrith.
- February 26, 1957: Whitey Lockman was traded by the Cardinals to the New York Giants for Hoyt Wilhelm.
- Prior to 1957 season: Cal Browning was signed as an amateur free agent by the Cardinals.

== Regular season ==
=== Season standings ===
National League
Team	W	L	Pct.	GB	Home	Road
Milwaukee Braves	95	59	.617	—	45‍–‍32	50‍–‍27
St. Louis Cardinals	87	67	.565	8	42‍–‍35	45‍–‍32
Brooklyn Dodgers	84	70	.545	11	43‍–‍34	41‍–‍36
Cincinnati Redlegs	80	74	.519	15	45‍–‍32	35‍–‍42
Philadelphia Phillies	77	77	.500	18	38‍–‍39	39‍–‍38
New York Giants	69	85	.448	26	37‍–‍40	32‍–‍45
Pittsburgh Pirates	62	92	.403	33	36‍–‍41	26‍–‍51
Chicago Cubs	62	92	.403	33	31‍–‍46	31‍–‍46

=== Record vs. opponents ===
1957 National League record Sources:
Team	BRO	CHC	CIN	MIL	NYG	PHI	PIT	STL
Brooklyn	—	17–5	12–10	10–12	12–10	9–13	12–10	12–10
Chicago	5–17	—	7–15	9–13	9–13	8–14–1	12–10–1	12–10
Cincinnati	10–12	15–7	—	4–18	12–10	16–6	14–8	9–13
Milwaukee	12–10	13–9	18–4	—	13–9	12–10–1	16–6	11–11
New York	10–12	13–9	10–12	9–13	—	10–12	9–13	8–14
Philadelphia	13–9	14–8–1	6–16	10–12–1	12–10	—	13–9	9–13
Pittsburgh	10–12	10–12–1	8–14	6–16	13–9	9–13	—	6–16
St. Louis	10–12	10–12	13–9	11–11	14–8	13–9	16–6	—

=== Notable transactions ===
- April 20, 1957: Ed Mayer and Bobby Del Greco were traded by the Cardinals to the Chicago Cubs for Jim King.
- May 14, 1957: Bob Smith was purchased from the Cardinals by the Pittsburgh Pirates.
- September 19, 1957: Eddie Miksis was selected off waivers from the Cardinals by the Baltimore Orioles
- September 19, 1957: Morrie Martin was purchased by the Cardinals from the Baltimore Orioles.
- September 21, 1957: Hoyt Wilhelm was selected off waivers from the Cardinals by the Cleveland Indians.

=== Roster ===
1957 St. Louis Cardinals
Roster
Pitchers: 27 Frank Barnes; 38 Tom Cheney; 26 Jim Davis; 36 Murry Dickson; 39 Larry Jackson; 23 Sam Jones; 46 Bob Kuzava; 40 Lynn Lovenguth; 25 Morrie Martin; 41 Lindy McDaniel; 45 Von McDaniel; 43 Lloyd Merritt; 26 Bob Miller; 17 Vinegar Bend Mizell; 38 Billy Muffett; 44 Willard Schmidt; 45 Bob Smith; 37 Herm Wehmeier; 25 Hoyt Wilhelm	Catchers: 30 Walker Cooper; 16 Hobie Landrith; 18 Hal Smith; Infielders: 22 Tom Alston; 3 Don Blasingame; 28 Joe Cunningham; 11 Al Dark; 10 Eddie Kasko; 6 Stan Musial; 19 Dick Schofield	Outfielders: 14 Ken Boyer; 7 Del Ennis; 24 Gene Green; 24 Chuck Harmon; 9 Jim King; 31,46 Don Lassetter; 4 Eddie Miksis; 20 Wally Moon; 8 Irv Noren; 15 Bobby Gene Smith	Manager: 29 Fred Hutchinson; Coaches: 30 Walker Cooper; 35 Stan Hack; 33 Al Hollingsworth; 34 Terry Moore; 33 Bill Posedel

== Player stats ==
=== Batting ===
= Indicates team leader

= Indicates league leader

==== Starters by position ====
Note: Pos = position; G = Games played; AB = At bats; H = Hits; Avg. = Batting average; HR = Home runs; RBI = Runs batted in

Pos	Player	G	AB	H	Avg.	HR	RBI
C	Hal Smith	100	333	93	.279	2	37
1B	Stan Musial	134	502	176	.351	29	102
2B	Don Blasingame	154	650	176	.271	8	58
SS	Al Dark	140	583	169	.290	4	64
3B	Eddie Kasko	134	479	131	.273	1	35
LF	Wally Moon	142	516	152	.295	24	73
CF	Ken Boyer	142	544	144	.265	19	62
RF	Del Ennis	136	490	140	.286	24	105

==== Other batters ====
Note: G = Games played; AB = At bats; H = Hits; Avg. = Batting average; HR = Home runs; RBI = Runs batted in

Player	G	AB	H	Avg.	HR	RBI
Joe Cunningham	122	261	83	.318	9	52
Hobie Landrith	75	214	52	.243	3	26
Bobby Smith	93	185	39	.211	3	18
Walker Cooper	48	78	21	.269	3	10
Ducky Schofield	65	56	9	.161	0	1
Eddie Miksis	49	38	8	.211	1	2
Jim King	22	35	11	.314	0	2
Irv Noren	17	30	11	.367	1	10
Tom Alston	9	17	5	.294	0	2
Gene Green	6	15	3	.200	0	2
Don Lassetter	4	13	2	.154	0	0
Chuck Harmon	9	3	1	.333	0	1

=== Pitching ===
==== Starting pitchers ====
Note: G = Games pitched; IP = Innings pitched; W = Wins; L = Losses; ERA = Earned run average; SO = Strikeouts

Player	G	IP	W	L	ERA	SO
Lindy McDaniel	30	191.0	15	9	3.49	75
Sam Jones	28	182.2	12	9	3.60	154
Von McDaniel	17	86.2	7	5	3.22	45
Murry Dickson	14	74.0	5	3	4.14	29

==== Other pitchers ====
Note: G = Games pitched; IP = Innings pitched; W = Wins; L = Losses; ERA = Earned run average; SO = Strikeouts

Player	G	IP	W	L	ERA	SO
Larry Jackson	41	210.1	15	9	3.47	96
Herm Wehmeier	36	165.0	10	7	4.31	91
Vinegar Bend Mizell	33	149.1	8	10	3.74	87
Willard Schmidt	40	116.2	10	3	4.78	63
Morrie Martin	4	10.2	0	0	2.53	7
Frank Barnes	3	10.0	0	1	4.50	5
Tom Cheney	4	9.0	0	1	5.00	10
Lynn Lovenguth	2	9.0	0	1	2.00	6

==== Relief pitchers ====
Note: G = Games pitched; W = Wins; L = Losses; SV = Saves; ERA = Earned run average; SO = Strikeouts

Player	G	W	L	SV	ERA	SO
Hoyt Wilhelm	40	1	4	11	4.25	29
Lloyd Merritt	44	1	2	7	3.31	35
Billy Muffett	23	3	2	8	2.25	21
Jim Davis	10	0	1	1	5.27	5
Bob Smith	6	0	0	1	4.66	11
Bob Miller	5	0	0	0	7.00	7
Bob Kuzava	3	0	0	0	3.86	2

== Farm system ==
Level	Team	League	Manager
AAA	Omaha Cardinals	American Association	Johnny Keane
AAA	Rochester Red Wings	International League	Cot Deal
AA	Houston Buffaloes	Texas League	Harry Walker
A	Columbus Foxes	Sally League	Skeeter Newsome
B	Winston-Salem Red Birds	Carolina League	George Kissell
C	Winnipeg Goldeyes	Northern League	Vern Benson
C	Billings Mustangs	Pioneer League	Ed Lyons
D	Wytheville Cardinals	Appalachian League	Johnny Grodzicki
D	Daytona Beach Islanders	Florida State League	Homer Ray Wilson
D	Albany Cardinals	Georgia–Florida League	Chase Riddle
D	Decatur Commodores	Midwest League	Al Unser
D	Ardmore Cardinals	Sooner State League	J. C. Dunn and Mike Ryba

LEAGUE CHAMPIONS: Houston, Winnipeg, Billings, Albany, Decatur, Ardmore
