= 1957 Brooklyn Dodgers season =

1957 Brooklyn Dodgers
- League: National League
- Ballpark: Ebbets Field; Roosevelt Stadium
- City: Brooklyn, New York; Jersey City, New Jersey
- Record: 84–70 (.545)
- Divisional place: 3rd
- Owners: Walter O'Malley, James & Dearie Mulvey, Mary Louise Smith
- President: Walter O'Malley
- General managers: Buzzie Bavasi
- Managers: Walter Alston
- Television: WOR-TV
- Radio: WMGM; Vin Scully, Jerry Doggett, Al Helfer; WHOM; Buck Canel

The 1957 Brooklyn Dodgers season was the 68th season for the Brooklyn Dodgers franchise in Major League Baseball's National League (NL). The season was overshadowed by Walter O'Malley's threat to move the Dodgers out of Brooklyn if the city did not build him a new stadium in that borough. When the best the mayor could promise was a stadium in Queens, O'Malley made good on his threats and moved the team to Los Angeles after the season ended. The Dodgers final game at Ebbets Field was on September 24 as they finished their 68th and last NL season, and their 75th overall, in Brooklyn in third place with an 84–70 record, 11 games behind the NL and World Series champion Milwaukee Braves.

== Offseason ==
- October 14, 1956: Connie Grob was purchased by the Dodgers from the Washington Senators.

== Regular season ==
During the season, the Dodgers played eight home games at Roosevelt Stadium in Jersey City, New Jersey, as part of owner Walter O'Malley's continued attempts to pressure Brooklyn to allow him to build a new stadium in his preferred location at Flatbush and Atlantic Avenues.

On July 20, 1957: Duke Snider hit the 300th home run of his career. The opposing pitcher was Dick Drott of the Chicago Cubs.

Danny McDevitt was the last pitcher to pitch for the Dodgers in a game at Ebbets Field. The game was contested on September 24, and McDevitt pitched a complete game. He had nine strikeouts while allowing only five hits.

=== Season standings ===
National League
Team	W	L	Pct.	GB	Home	Road
Milwaukee Braves	95	59	.617	—	45‍–‍32	50‍–‍27
St. Louis Cardinals	87	67	.565	8	42‍–‍35	45‍–‍32
Brooklyn Dodgers	84	70	.545	11	43‍–‍34	41‍–‍36
Cincinnati Redlegs	80	74	.519	15	45‍–‍32	35‍–‍42
Philadelphia Phillies	77	77	.500	18	38‍–‍39	39‍–‍38
New York Giants	69	85	.448	26	37‍–‍40	32‍–‍45
Pittsburgh Pirates	62	92	.403	33	36‍–‍41	26‍–‍51
Chicago Cubs	62	92	.403	33	31‍–‍46	31‍–‍46

=== Record vs. opponents ===
1957 National League record Sources:
Team	BRO	CHC	CIN	MIL	NYG	PHI	PIT	STL
Brooklyn	—	17–5	12–10	10–12	12–10	9–13	12–10	12–10
Chicago	5–17	—	7–15	9–13	9–13	8–14–1	12–10–1	12–10
Cincinnati	10–12	15–7	—	4–18	12–10	16–6	14–8	9–13
Milwaukee	12–10	13–9	18–4	—	13–9	12–10–1	16–6	11–11
New York	10–12	13–9	10–12	9–13	—	10–12	9–13	8–14
Philadelphia	13–9	14–8–1	6–16	10–12–1	12–10	—	13–9	9–13
Pittsburgh	10–12	10–12–1	8–14	6–16	13–9	9–13	—	6–16
St. Louis	10–12	10–12	13–9	11–11	14–8	13–9	16–6	—

=== Opening Day Lineup ===
Opening Day Lineup
#	Name	Position
19	Jim Gilliam	2B
9	Gino Cimoli	LF
4	Duke Snider	CF
6	Carl Furillo	RF
14	Gil Hodges	1B
2	Randy Jackson	3B
39	Roy Campanella	C
23	Don Zimmer	SS
36	Don Newcombe	P

=== Notable transactions ===
- April 5, 1957: Chico Fernández was traded by the Dodgers to the Philadelphia Phillies for Ron Negray, Tim Harkness, Elmer Valo, Mel Geho (minors), cash and a player to be named later. The Phillies completed the deal by sending Ben Flowers to the Dodgers on April 8.
- May 23: Don Elston was traded by the Dodgers to the Chicago Cubs for Vito Valentinetti and Jackie Collum.
- May 26: Tommy Lasorda was purchased by the Dodgers from the New York Yankees
- May 30: Jim Fridley was purchased by the Dodgers from the New York Yankees.
- June 14: Ken Lehman was purchased from the Dodgers by the Baltimore Orioles.
- June 15: Babe Birrer was purchased by the Dodgers from the Baltimore Orioles.
- August 24: Vito Valentinetti was purchased from the Dodgers by the Cleveland Indians.

=== Roster ===
1957 Brooklyn Dodgers
Roster
Pitchers: 46 Don Bessent; 55 Jackie Collum; 40 Roger Craig; 53 Don Drysdale; 50 Don Elston; 17 Carl Erskine; 21 Bill Harris; 26 Fred Kipp; 32 Sandy Koufax; 41 Clem Labine; 16 Ken Lehman; 35 Sal Maglie; 16 Danny McDevitt; 36 Don Newcombe; 45 Johnny Podres; 37 Ed Roebuck; 49 René Valdez	Catchers: 39 Roy Campanella; 58 Joe Pignatano; 8 John Roseboro; 10 Rube Walker; Infielders: 38 Jim Gentile; 19 Jim Gilliam; 14 Gil Hodges; 2 Randy Jackson; 43 Charlie Neal; 1 Pee Wee Reese; 23 Don Zimmer	Outfielders: 15 Sandy Amorós; 9 Gino Cimoli; 6 Carl Furillo; 49 Bob Kennedy; 4 Duke Snider; 3 Elmer Valo; Other batters: 50 Rod Miller	Manager: 24 Walter Alston; Coaches: 33 Joe Becker; 22 Billy Herman; 51 Greg Mulleavy; 31 Jake Pitler

== Player stats ==
=== Batting ===
==== Starters by position ====
Note: Pos = Position; G = Games played; AB = At bats; H = Hits; Avg. = Batting average; HR = Home runs; RBI = Runs batted in

Pos	Player	G	AB	H	Avg.	HR	RBI
C	Roy Campanella	103	330	80	.242	13	62
1B	Gil Hodges	150	579	173	.299	27	98
2B	Jim Gilliam	149	617	154	.250	2	37
SS	Charlie Neal	128	448	121	.270	12	62
3B	Pee Wee Reese	103	330	74	.224	1	29
LF	Gino Cimoli	142	532	156	.293	10	57
CF	Duke Snider	139	508	139	.274	40	92
RF	Carl Furillo	119	395	121	.306	12	66

==== Other batters ====
Note: G = Games played; AB = At bats; H = Hits; Avg. = Batting average; HR = Home runs; RBI = Runs batted in

Player	G	AB	H	Avg.	HR	RBI
Don Zimmer	84	269	59	.219	6	19
Sandy Amoros	106	238	66	.277	7	26
Rube Walker	60	166	30	.181	2	23
Elmer Valo	81	161	44	.273	4	26
Randy Jackson	48	131	26	.198	2	16
John Roseboro	35	69	10	.145	2	6
Bob Kennedy	19	31	4	.129	1	4
Joe Pignatano	8	14	3	.214	0	1
Jim Gentile	4	6	1	.167	1	1
Rod Miller	1	1	0	.000	0	0

=== Pitching ===
==== Starting pitchers ====
Note: G = Games pitched; IP = Innings pitched; W = Wins; L = Losses; ERA = Earned run average; SO = Strikeouts

Player	G	IP	W	L	ERA	SO
Don Drysdale	34	221.0	17	9	2.69	148
Don Newcombe	28	198.2	11	12	3.49	90
Johnny Podres	31	196.0	12	9	2.66	109
Danny McDevitt	22	119.0	7	4	3.25	90
Sal Maglie	9	101.1	6	6	2.93	50
Bill Harris	1	7.0	0	1	3.86	3

==== Other pitchers ====
Note: G = Games pitched; IP = Innings pitched; W = Wins; L = Losses; ERA = Earned run average; SO = Strikeouts

Player	G	IP	W	L	ERA	SO
Roger Craig	32	111.1	6	9	4.61	69
Sandy Koufax	34	104.1	5	4	3.88	122
Carl Erskine	15	66.0	5	3	3.55	26
René Valdés	5	13.0	1	1	5.54	10

==== Relief pitchers ====
Note: G = Games pitched; W = Wins; L = Losses; SV = Saves; ERA = Earned run average; SO = Strikeouts

Player	G	W	L	SV	ERA	SO
Clem Labine	58	5	7	17	3.44	67
Ed Roebuck	44	8	2	8	2.71	73
Don Bessent	27	1	3	0	5.73	24
Ken Lehman	3	0	0	0	0.00	3
Jackie Collum	3	0	0	0	8.31	3
Fred Kipp	1	0	0	0	9.00	3
Don Elston	1	0	0	0	0.00	1

== Awards and honors ==
- Gold Glove Award
  - Gil Hodges

=== All-Stars ===
- 1957 Major League Baseball All-Star Game
  - Gino Cimoli reserve
  - Gil Hodges reserve
  - Clem Labine reserve

== Farm system ==
Level	Team	League	Manager
Open	Los Angeles Angels	Pacific Coast League	Clay Bryant
AAA	Montreal Royals	International League	Greg Mulleavy; Al Campanis; Al Ronning; Tommy Holmes
AAA	St. Paul Saints	American Association	Max Macon
A	Macon Dodgers	South Atlantic League	Goldie Holt
A	Pueblo Dodgers	Western League	Ray Hathaway
B	Cedar Rapids Raiders	Illinois–Indiana–Iowa League	Danny Ozark
B	Victoria Rosebuds	Texas League	Lou Rochelli
C	Great Falls Electrics	Pioneer League	Jack Banta
C	Reno Silver Sox	California League	Ray Perry
D	Bluefield Dodgers	Appalachian League	Jim Bragan
D	Kokomo Dodgers	Midwest League	Pete Reiser
D	Shawnee Hawks	Sooner State League	Edward Serrano
D	Thomasville Dodgers	Georgia–Florida League	Rudy Rufer; Leon Hamilton; Roger Wright

League champions: Bluefield
