= Don Lassetter =

American baseball player (1933–2024)

- Outfielder
- Born: March 27, 1933; Newnan, Georgia, U.S.
- Died: January 22, 2024 (aged 90)
- Batted: Right Threw: Right

MLB debut
- September 21, 1957, for the St. Louis Cardinals

Last MLB appearance
- September 29, 1957, for the St. Louis Cardinals

MLB statistics
- Batting average: .154
- Home runs: 0
- Runs batted in: 0
- Stats at Baseball Reference

Teams
- St. Louis Cardinals (1957)

Donald O'Neal Lassetter (March 27, 1933 – January 22, 2024) was an American professional baseball player. The outfielder appeared in four Major League Baseball games as a member of the 1957 St. Louis Cardinals, but spent the remainder of his eight-season career in minor league baseball.

Lassetter attended the University of Georgia, threw and batted right-handed, stood 6 feet 3 inches (1.91 m) tall and weighed 200 pounds (91 kg). His 13-at-bat Major League trial with the 1957 Cardinals occurred after he hit 27 home runs and knocked home 84 runs batted in for Triple-A Omaha of the American Association. His two MLB hits included a triple off Dick Drott of the Chicago Cubs on September 27, 1957.

Lassetter died on January 22, 2024, at the age of 90.
