= 1957 Pittsburgh Pirates season =

1957 Pittsburgh Pirates
- League: National League
- Ballpark: Forbes Field
- City: Pittsburgh, Pennsylvania
- Owners: John W. Galbreath (majority shareholder); Bing Crosby, Thomas P. Johnson, Branch Rickey (minority shareholders)
- General managers: Joe L. Brown
- Managers: Bobby Bragan, Danny Murtaugh
- Television: KDKA-TV; Bob Prince, Paul Long
- Radio: KDKA; Bob Prince, Dick Bingham

The 1957 Pittsburgh Pirates season was the 76th season of the Pittsburgh Pirates franchise; the 71st in the National League. The Pirates finished tied with the Chicago Cubs for eighth and last in the league standings with a record of 62–92.

The first season to be broadcast on television, the games were aired on KDKA-TV, making them the last of the original MLB teams to debut television broadcasts of its home and away games.

== Regular season ==
The Pittsburgh Pirates played the Brooklyn Dodgers in the final game at Ebbets Field. The game was contested on September 24, 1957, and Brooklyn pitcher Danny McDevitt pitched a complete-game shutout, winning 2–0. He had nine strikeouts while allowing just five hits.

=== Season standings ===
National League
Team	W	L	Pct.	GB	Home	Road
Milwaukee Braves	95	59	.617	—	45‍–‍32	50‍–‍27
St. Louis Cardinals	87	67	.565	8	42‍–‍35	45‍–‍32
Brooklyn Dodgers	84	70	.545	11	43‍–‍34	41‍–‍36
Cincinnati Redlegs	80	74	.519	15	45‍–‍32	35‍–‍42
Philadelphia Phillies	77	77	.500	18	38‍–‍39	39‍–‍38
New York Giants	69	85	.448	26	37‍–‍40	32‍–‍45
Pittsburgh Pirates	62	92	.403	33	36‍–‍41	26‍–‍51
Chicago Cubs	62	92	.403	33	31‍–‍46	31‍–‍46

=== Record vs. opponents ===
1957 National League record Sources:
Team	BRO	CHC	CIN	MIL	NYG	PHI	PIT	STL
Brooklyn	—	17–5	12–10	10–12	12–10	9–13	12–10	12–10
Chicago	5–17	—	7–15	9–13	9–13	8–14–1	12–10–1	12–10
Cincinnati	10–12	15–7	—	4–18	12–10	16–6	14–8	9–13
Milwaukee	12–10	13–9	18–4	—	13–9	12–10–1	16–6	11–11
New York	10–12	13–9	10–12	9–13	—	10–12	9–13	8–14
Philadelphia	13–9	14–8–1	6–16	10–12–1	12–10	—	13–9	9–13
Pittsburgh	10–12	10–12–1	8–14	6–16	13–9	9–13	—	6–16
St. Louis	10–12	10–12	13–9	11–11	14–8	13–9	16–6	—

=== Game log ===
1957 Game Log: 62–92 (Home: 36–41; Away: 26–51)
April: 4–8 (Home: 3–2; Away: 1–6)

#	Date	Opponent	Score	Win	Loss	Save	Attendance	Record
1	April 16	Giants	9–2	**Friend** (1–0)	Antonelli	—	33,405	1–0
2	April 18	@ Dodgers	1–6	Maglie	**Arroyo** (0–1)	—	11,202	1–1
3	April 20	@ Dodgers	0–2	Podres	**Friend** (1–1)	—	11,083	1–2
4	April 21	@ Dodgers	6–3	**Purkey** (1–0)	Newcombe	**Face** (1)		2–2
5	April 21	@ Dodgers	4–7	Drysdale	**Kline** (0–1)	Labine	19,635	2–3
6	April 22	@ Giants	1–3	Gomez	**Arroyo** (0–2)	—	5,403	2–4
7	April 23	@ Giants	0–1	Burnside	**Kline** (0–2)	—	3,445	2–5
8	April 24	@ Phillies	5–8	Simmons	**Friend** (1–2)	Miller	15,849	2–6
9	April 26	Dodgers	7–1	**Purkey** (2–0)	Podres	—	26,918	3–6
10	April 27	Dodgers	2–6	Newcombe	**Kline** (0–3)	—	12,926	3–7
11	April 28	Dodgers	3–0	**Friend** (2–2)	Craig	—	17,317	4–7
12	April 30	Cardinals	5–6 (13)	Jackson	**Face** (0–1)	—	19,291	4–8

May: 7–19 (Home: 4–13; Away: 3–6)

#	Date	Opponent	Score	Win	Loss	Save	Attendance	Record
13	May 1	Cardinals	2–9	Schmidt	**Purkey** (2–1)	Smith	4,919	4–9
14	May 2	Braves	5–8 (10)	Burdette	**Face** (0–2)	Murff	14,131	4–10
15	May 3	Braves	7–8 (11)	Murff	**Face** (0–3)	Spahn	16,621	4–11
16	May 4	Braves	1–0	**Law** (1–0)	Pizarro	—	6,398	5–11
17	May 5	Redlegs	2–6	Lawrence	**Arroyo** (0–3)	—		5–12
18	May 5	Redlegs	3–7	Gross	**Purkey** (2–2)	—	23,629	5–13
19	May 7	Cubs	8–10 (14)	Lown	**Pepper** (0–1)	Collum	9,957	5–14
20	May 8	Cubs	1–7	Drott	**Law** (1–1)	—	7,896	5–15
21	May 10	Phillies	1–3	Sanford	**Kline** (0–4)	—	10,027	5–16
22	May 11	Phillies	2–7	Haddix	**Friend** (2–3)	—	4,994	5–17
23	May 12	Phillies	2–6	Simmons	**Arroyo** (0–4)	Miller		5–18
24	May 12	Phillies	6–1	**Law** (2–1)	Roberts	—	10,457	6–18
25	May 14	@ Cubs	8–6	**Arroyo** (1–4)	Drott	**Face** (2)	2,478	7–18
26	May 16	@ Braves	2–1	**Friend** (3–3)	Pizarro	—	15,622	8–18
27	May 18	@ Braves	5–6	Burdette	**Smith** (0–1)	—	18,850	8–19
28	May 19	@ Redlegs	7–8	Acker	**Purkey** (2–3)	—		8–20
29	May 19	@ Redlegs	4–5	Acker	**Kline** (0–5)	—	24,564	8–21
30	May 24	@ Phillies	3–7	Sanford	**Friend** (3–4)	Farrell	17,340	8–22
31	May 25	@ Phillies	6–8	Haddix	**Kline** (0–6)	Farrell	6,445	8–23
32	May 26	@ Phillies	13–5	**Face** (1–3)	Simmons	—		9–23
33	May 26	@ Phillies	3–6	Cardwell	**Arroyo** (1–5)	—	13,557	9–24
34	May 28	Dodgers	3–2 (11)	**Face** (2–3)	Newcombe	—	13,259	10–24
35	May 29	Dodgers	0–1	Podres	**Kline** (0–7)	—	3,610	10–25
36	May 30	Dodgers	3–4	Maglie	**Law** (2–2)	Labine		10–26
37	May 30	Dodgers	2–1	**Purkey** (3–3)	Koufax	—	24,263	11–26
38	May 31	Giants	2–3	Worthington	**Face** (2–4)	—	13,070	11–27

June: 15–19 (Home: 10–8; Away: 5–11)

#	Date	Opponent	Score	Win	Loss	Save	Attendance	Record
39	June 1	Giants	2–3	Worthington	**Friend** (3–5)	—	5,301	11–28
40	June 2	Giants	3–2	**Kline** (1–7)	Barclay	**Arroyo** (1)		12–28
41	June 2	Giants	2–0	**Purkey** (4–3)	Burnside	—	12,792	13–28
42	June 3	Giants	6–5	**King** (1–0)	Margoneri	**Face** (3)	7,504	14–28
43	June 4	Cardinals	5–4	**Arroyo** (2–5)	Wilhelm	**Face** (4)	12,178	15–28
44	June 5	Cardinals	1–5	McDaniel	**Friend** (3–6)	—	12,570	15–29
45	June 6	Cardinals	0–6	Dickson	**Kline** (1–8)	—	4,017	15–30
46	June 7	Braves	0–5	Spahn	**Purkey** (4–4)	—	21,762	15–31
47	June 9	Braves	1–2 (11)	Trowbridge	**Friend** (3–7)	Johnson		15–32
48	June 9	Braves	5–3	**Kline** (2–8)	Pizarro	**Face** (5)	21,888	16–32
49	June 10	Redlegs	5–2	**Law** (3–2)	Nuxhall	—	11,471	17–32
50	June 11	Redlegs	8–1	**Purkey** (5–4)	Gross	—	10,653	18–32
51	June 12	Redlegs	4–3 (10)	**Face** (3–4)	Acker	—	14,920	19–32
52	June 13	Redlegs	3–2	**Friend** (4–7)	Jeffcoat	—	7,346	20–32
53	June 14	Cubs	5–11	Drott	**Kline** (2–9)	Elston	17,088	20–33
54	June 15	Cubs	1–5	Drabowsky	**Law** (3–3)	—	7,495	20–34
55	June 16	Cubs	1–4	Kaiser	**Arroyo** (2–6)	Lown		20–35
56	June 16	Cubs	5–4	**Law** (4–3)	Brosnan	—	18,525	21–35
57	June 17	@ Braves	7–5	**Purkey** (6–4)	Jolly	**Law** (1)	26,664	22–35
58	June 18	@ Cardinals	8–1	**Swanson** (1–0)	Jackson	—	17,694	23–35
59	June 19	@ Cardinals	2–5	Jones	**Kline** (2–10)	—		23–36
60	June 19	@ Cardinals	1–5	McDaniel	**Purkey** (6–5)	Wilhelm	25,880	23–37
61	June 20	@ Cardinals	4–7	Dickson	**Arroyo** (2–7)	Merritt	11,223	23–38
62	June 21	@ Redlegs	3–2 (11)	**Purkey** (7–5)	Jeffcoat	—	19,648	24–38
63	June 22	@ Redlegs	3–6 (11)	Lawrence	**Purkey** (7–6)	—	9,299	24–39
64	June 23	@ Redlegs	3–5	Jeffcoat	**Swanson** (1–1)	—		24–40
65	June 23	@ Redlegs	2–5	Acker	**Kline** (2–11)	Sanchez	22,188	24–41
66	June 25	@ Cubs	3–5	Hillman	**Friend** (4–8)	Lown	5,002	24–42
67	June 26	@ Cubs	15–5	**Law** (5–3)	Poholsky	—		25–42
68	June 26	@ Cubs	5–5 (11)			—	7,460	25–42
69	June 27	@ Cubs	5–4 (10)	**King** (2–0)	Lown	—	4,900	26–42
70	June 28	@ Braves	2–4	Spahn	**Friend** (4–9)	—	27,087	26–43
71	June 29	@ Braves	6–13	Pizarro	**O'Brien** (0–1)	—	22,383	26–44
72	June 30	@ Braves	4–7	Johnson	**Law** (5–4)	—		26–45
73	June 30	@ Braves	5–6 (13)	Jolly	**Arroyo** (2–8)	—	36,283	26–46

July: 10–20 (Home: 4–10; Away: 6–10)

#	Date	Opponent	Score	Win	Loss	Save	Attendance	Record
74	July 1	Phillies	4–5	Hearn	**Smith** (0–2)	Morehead	14,680	26–47
75	July 4	@ Dodgers	5–1	**Friend** (5–9)	Erskine	—		27–47
76	July 4	@ Dodgers	2–8	Newcombe	**Purkey** (7–7)	—	20,664	27–48
77	July 5	@ Giants	6–11	Antonelli	**Trimble** (0–1)	Grissom	4,998	27–49
78	July 6	@ Giants	3–2 (13)	**Purkey** (8–7)	Miller	—	5,334	28–49
79	July 7	@ Giants	10–6	**Swanson** (2–1)	Worthington	**King** (1)		29–49
80	July 7	@ Giants	8–1	**Friend** (6–9)	Gomez	—	10,825	30–49
81	July 10	Braves	5–2	**Purkey** (9–7)	Buhl	—	18,731	31–49
82	July 11	Braves	2–7	Trowbridge	**Friend** (6–10)	—	17,278	31–50
83	July 12	Braves	4–5	Spahn	**Face** (3–5)	McMahon	20,078	31–51
84	July 13	Braves	3–4	Burdette	**Kline** (2–12)	—	9,330	31–52
85	July 14	Redlegs	6–9	Freeman	**Friend** (6–11)	—		31–53
86	July 14	Redlegs	4–12	Nuxhall	**Trimble** (0–2)	—	24,540	31–54
87	July 16	Cubs	5–3	**Friend** (7–11)	Rush	—	11,300	32–54
88	July 17	Cubs	3–4	Drabowsky	**Kline** (2–13)	Littlefield	8,534	32–55
89	July 18	Cubs	6–5	**Arroyo** (3–8)	Lown	—	3,877	33–55
90	July 19	Cardinals	7–0	**Law** (6–4)	McDaniel	—	25,774	34–55
91	July 20	Cardinals	4–9	Dickson	**Friend** (7–12)	Merritt	9,230	34–56
92	July 21	Cardinals	3–7 (10)	Schmidt	**Arroyo** (3–9)	Wilhelm		34–57
93	July 21	Cardinals	2–11	McDaniel	**Purkey** (9–8)	—	20,280	34–58
94	July 23	@ Redlegs	6–3 (15)	**Law** (7–4)	Lawrence	**Purkey** (1)	17,551	35–58
95	July 24	@ Redlegs	0–2	Nuxhall	**Friend** (7–13)	—	11,961	35–59
96	July 25	@ Redlegs	1–9	Fowler	**Kline** (2–14)	—	10,997	35–60
97	July 26	@ Cardinals	3–4 (10)	Schmidt	**Kline** (2–15)	—	15,352	35–61
98	July 27	@ Cardinals	4–2	**Purkey** (10–8)	Dickson	—	9,633	36–61
99	July 28	@ Cardinals	0–4	McDaniel	**Law** (7–5)	—		36–62
100	July 28	@ Cardinals	8–9 (11)	Wilhelm	**King** (2–1)	—	21,319	36–63
101	July 29	@ Cardinals	0–4	Mizell	**Douglas** (0–1)	—	10,302	36–64
102	July 30	@ Braves	2–5	Burdette	**Swanson** (2–2)	—	23,670	36–65
103	July 31	@ Braves	2–4	Buhl	**Purkey** (10–9)	—	24,522	36–66

August: 12–13 (Home: 8–6; Away: 4–7)

#	Date	Opponent	Score	Win	Loss	Save	Attendance	Record
104	August 2	@ Cubs	4–6	Hillman	**Law** (7–6)	—	5,414	36–67
105	August 4	@ Cubs	0–6	Drabowsky	**Friend** (7–14)	—		36–68
106	August 4	@ Cubs	2–3 (11)	Hillman	**Arroyo** (3–10)	—	14,757	36–69
107	August 6	Phillies	5–3	**Kline** (3–15)	Sanford	—	11,136	37–69
108	August 8	Phillies	3–6	Simmons	**Law** (7–7)	Miller	5,238	37–70
109	August 9	Dodgers	2–4	McDevitt	**Friend** (7–15)	Labine	14,100	37–71
110	August 10	Dodgers	0–3	Drysdale	**Purkey** (10–10)	—	7,751	37–72
111	August 11	Dodgers	4–3 (10)	**Law** (8–7)	Labine	—		38–72
112	August 11	Dodgers	6–2	**Douglas** (1–1)	Craig	**Face** (6)	18,350	39–72
113	August 13	@ Phillies	6–0	**Friend** (8–15)	Hacker	—	14,129	40–72
114	August 14	@ Phillies	10–3	**Law** (9–7)	Simmons	—	8,641	41–72
115	August 16	@ Dodgers	1–4	Podres	**Purkey** (10–11)	Roebuck	9,592	41–73
116	August 17	@ Dodgers	7–3	**Kline** (4–15)	Koufax	—	6,830	42–73
117	August 18	@ Dodgers	1–2	Maglie	**Friend** (8–16)	—	14,416	42–74
118	August 18	@ Dodgers	8–6	**Face** (4–5)	Labine	**Purkey** (2)	14,416	43–74
119	August 20	Braves	1–3	Spahn	**Arroyo** (3–11)	—	21,328	43–75
120	August 22	Redlegs	8–3	**Friend** (9–16)	Gross	—	10,027	44–75
121	August 23	Redlegs	0–6	Nuxhall	**Purkey** (10–12)	—	13,223	44–76
122	August 24	Redlegs	4–1	**Kline** (5–15)	Lawrence	—	7,037	45–76
123	August 25	Cubs	3–0	**Law** (10–7)	Drabowsky	—		46–76
124	August 25	Cubs	2–8	Elston	**Douglas** (1–2)	Lown	11,770	46–77
125	August 27	Cardinals	2–1	**Friend** (10–16)	McDaniel	—	12,845	47–77
126	August 28	Cardinals	2–0	**Kline** (6–15)	Jackson	—	10,367	48–77
127	August 30	@ Phillies	3–4	Sanford	**Law** (10–8)	—	8,157	48–78
128	August 31	@ Phillies	1–7	Cardwell	**Friend** (10–17)	—	5,141	48–79

September: 14–13 (Home: 7–2; Away: 7–11)

#	Date	Opponent	Score	Win	Loss	Save	Attendance	Record
129	September 1	@ Phillies	3–11	Roberts	**Purkey** (10–13)	—		48–80
130	September 1	@ Phillies	6–3	**Douglas** (2–2)	Simmons	**Face** (7)	11,294	49–80
131	September 2	@ Giants	5–11	Monzant	**Face** (4–6)	—		49–81
132	September 2	@ Giants	3–4	Antonelli	**O'Brien** (0–2)	Grissom	10,310	49–82
133	September 3	@ Giants	5–6 (12)	Miller	**Smith** (0–3)	—		49–83
134	September 4	Giants	2–0	**Friend** (11–17)	McCormick	—	8,909	50–83
135	September 5	Giants	4–2	**Douglas** (3–2)	Worthington	**Face** (8)	5,189	51–83
136	September 6	Phillies	3–2	**Kline** (7–15)	Haddix	—	6,915	52–83
137	September 7	Phillies	6–3	**Swanson** (3–2)	Sanford	**Face** (9)	4,612	53–83
138	September 8	Phillies	4–7	Farrell	**Purkey** (10–14)	Roberts		53–84
139	September 8	Phillies	6–2	**Smith** (1–3)	Hacker	—	12,021	54–84
140	September 10	@ Braves	3–4	Burdette	**Douglas** (3–3)	—	22,257	54–85
141	September 11	@ Braves	2–1	**Kline** (8–15)	Spahn	—	14,713	55–85
142	September 13	@ Cubs	4–1	**Friend** (12–17)	Elston	—		56–85
143	September 13	@ Cubs	2–1	**Smith** (2–3)	Drabowsky	**Face** (10)	2,197	57–85
144	September 14	@ Cubs	3–1	**O'Brien** (1–2)	Brosnan	—		58–85
145	September 14	@ Cubs	3–7	Brosnan	**O'Brien** (1–3)	Lown	6,170	58–86
146	September 15	@ Cardinals	6–9	Wehmeier	**Kline** (8–16)	Muffett		58–87
147	September 15	@ Cardinals	3–11	Jones	**Swanson** (3–3)	Muffett	24,577	58–88
148	September 17	@ Redlegs	5–9	Nuxhall	**Friend** (12–18)	Kennedy	3,676	58–89
149	September 18	@ Redlegs	1–2	Lawrence	**Smith** (2–4)	—	3,607	58–90
150	September 21	Giants	5–4	**Purkey** (11–14)	Worthington	—		59–90
151	September 21	Giants	5–9	Gomez	**Witt** (0–1)	Grissom	8,110	59–91
152	September 22	Giants	5–1	**Friend** (13–18)	Monzant	—	19,574	60–91
153	September 24	@ Dodgers	0–2	McDevitt	**Daniels** (0–1)	—	6,702	60–92
154	September 28	@ Giants	1–0	**Kline** (9–16)	Gomez	—		61–92
155	September 29	@ Giants	9–1	**Friend** (14–18)	Antonelli	—	11,606	62–92

Legend: = Win = Loss = Tie
Bold = Pirates team member

=== Notable transactions ===
- May 1, 1957: Dale Long and Lee Walls were traded by the Pirates to the Chicago Cubs for Dee Fondy and Gene Baker.
- May 14, 1957: Bob Smith was purchased by the Pirates from the St. Louis Cardinals.

=== Roster ===
1957 Pittsburgh Pirates
**Roster**
**Pitchers**: 39 Luis Arroyo; 28 Chuck Churn; 30 Bennie Daniels; 31 Whammy Douglas; 26 Roy Face; 19 Bob Friend; 30 Dick Hall; 29 Nellie King; 22 Ron Kline; 37 Bob Kuzava; 32 Vern Law; 16 Eddie O'Brien; 6 Johnny O'Brien; 31 Laurin Pepper; 34 Bob Purkey; 37 Bob Smith; 35 Red Swanson; 36 Joe Trimble; 38,52 George Witt	**Catchers**: 20 Hank Foiles; 17,28 Danny Kravitz; 17 Hardy Peterson; 10 Dick Rand; **Infielders**: 23 Gene Baker; 3 Dee Fondy; 8 Gene Freese; 24 Dick Groat; 31 Ken Hamlin; 3 Dale Long; 9 Bill Mazeroski; 5 Buddy Pritchard; 15 Frank Thomas	**Outfielders**: 21 Roberto Clemente; 25 Román Mejías; 12 Jim Pendleton; 14 John Powers; 4 Bob Skinner; 11 Paul Smith; 18 Bill Virdon; 16 Lee Walls	**Manager**: 2 Bobby Bragan; 40 Danny Murtaugh; **Coaches**: 42 Lenny Levy; 40 Danny Murtaugh; 43 Sam Narron; 41 Clyde Sukeforth

== Player stats ==
=== Batting ===
==== Starters by position ====
Note: Pos = Position; G = Games played; AB = At bats; H = Hits; Avg. = Batting average; HR = Home runs; RBI = Runs batted in

Pos	Player	G	AB	H	Avg.	HR	RBI
C	Hank Foiles	109	281	76	.270	9	36
1B	Dee Fondy	95	323	101	.313	2	35
2B	Bill Mazeroski	148	526	149	.283	8	54
SS	Dick Groat	125	501	158	.315	7	54
3B	Gene Freese	114	346	98	.283	6	31
LF	Bob Skinner	126	387	118	.305	13	45
CF	Bill Virdon	144	561	141	.251	8	50
RF	Roberto Clemente	111	451	114	.253	4	30

==== Other batters ====
Note: G = Games played; AB = At bats; H = Hits; Avg. = Batting average; HR = Home runs; RBI = Runs batted in

Player	G	AB	H	Avg.	HR	RBI
Frank Thomas	151	594	172	.290	23	89
Gene Baker	111	365	97	.266	2	36
Paul Smith	81	150	38	.253	3	11
Román Mejías	58	142	39	.275	2	15
Dick Rand	60	105	23	.219	1	9
Hardy Peterson	30	73	22	.301	2	11
Jim Pendleton	46	59	18	.305	0	9
Danny Kravitz	19	41	6	.146	0	4
Johnny O'Brien	34	35	11	.314	0	1
John Powers	20	35	10	.286	2	8
Dale Long	7	22	4	.182	0	5
Lee Walls	8	22	4	.182	0	0
Buddy Pritchard	23	11	1	.091	0	0
Ken Hamlin	2	1	0	.000	0	0

=== Pitching ===
==== Starting pitchers ====
Note: G = Games pitched; IP = Innings pitched; W = Wins; L = Losses; ERA = Earned run average; SO = Strikeouts

Player	G	IP	W	L	ERA	SO
Bob Friend	40	277.0	14	18	3.38	143
Ron Kline	40	205.0	9	16	4.04	88
Vern Law	31	172.2	10	8	2.87	55
Whammy Douglas	11	47.0	3	3	3.26	28
Bennie Daniels	1	7.0	0	1	1.29	101
George Witt	1	1.1	0	1	40.50	1

==== Other pitchers ====
Note: G = Games pitched; IP = Innings pitched; W = Wins; L = Losses; ERA = Earned run average; SO = Strikeouts

Player	G	IP	W	L	ERA	SO
Bob Purkey	48	179.2	11	14	3.86	51
Luis Arroyo	54	130.2	3	11	4.68	2
Red Swanson	32	72.2	3	3	3.72	29
Joe Trimble	5	19.2	0	2	8.24	9
Eddie O'Brien	3	12.1	1	0	2.19	10
Laurin Pepper	5	9.0	0	0	8.00	4

==== Relief pitchers ====
Note: G = Games pitched; W = Wins; L = Losses; SV = Saves; ERA = Earned run average; SO = Strikeouts

Player	G	W	L	SV	ERA	SO
Roy Face	59	4	6	10	3.07	53
Nellie King	36	2	1	1	4.50	23
Bob Smith	20	2	4	0	3.11	35
Johnny O'Brien	16	0	3	0	6.08	19
Dick Hall	8	0	0	0	10.80	7
Chuck Churn	5	0	0	0	4.32	4
Bob Kuzava	4	0	0	0	9.00	1

== Farm system ==
Level	Team	League	Manager
Open	Hollywood Stars	Pacific Coast League	Clyde King
AAA	Columbus Jets	International League	Frank Oceak
A	Lincoln Chiefs	Western League	Larry Shepard
B	Beaumont Pirates	Big State League	Monty Basgall
C	Douglas Copper Kings	Arizona–Mexico League	Bob Clear
C	San Jose JoSox	California League	Dick Whitman
C	Grand Forks Chiefs	Northern League	Al Kubski and Jack Paepke
D	Salem Rebels	Appalachian League	Lamar Dorton
D	Clinton Pirates	Midwest League	Stan Wentzel
D	Jamestown Falcons	New York–Penn League	Jack Paepke

LEAGUE CHAMPIONS: Lincoln
Jamestown club folded, June 25, 1957
