= Skaugstad =

Skaugstad is a Norwegian surname. Notable people with the surname include:

- Daryle Skaugstad (born 1957), American football player
- Dave Skaugstad (1940–2023), American baseball player
