= 1957 New York Giants (MLB) season =

1957 New York Giants
- League: National League
- Ballpark: Polo Grounds
- City: New York City
- Record: 69–85 (.448)
- League place: 6th
- Owners: Horace Stoneham
- General managers: Chub Feeney
- Managers: Bill Rigney
- Television: WPIX (Russ Hodges, Bob DeLaney, Jim Woods)
- Radio: WMCA (Russ Hodges, Bob DeLaney, Jim Woods)

The 1957 New York Giants Season involved the team finishing in sixth place in the National League with a 69–85 record, 26 games behind the NL and World Champion Milwaukee Braves. It was the team's 75th and final season in New York City before its relocation to San Francisco, California for the following season. Their last game at their stadium, the Polo Grounds and as a New York-based franchise was a 9–1 loss to the Pittsburgh Pirates on September 29.

== Offseason ==
- October 26, 1956: Hank Sauer was signed as a free agent by the Giants.
- February 21, 1957: Manny Mota was signed as an amateur free agent by the Giants.
- February 26, 1957: Hoyt Wilhelm was traded by the Giants to the St. Louis Cardinals for Whitey Lockman.
- March 27, 1957: Bill Sarni was released by the Giants.
- Prior to 1957 season: John Orsino was signed as an amateur free agent by the Giants.

== Regular season ==
=== Relocation to San Francisco ===
While seeking a new stadium to replace the crumbling Polo Grounds, the Giants began to contemplate a move from New York, initially considering Metropolitan Stadium in Minneapolis–St. Paul, which was home to their top farm team, the Minneapolis Millers. Under the rules of the time, the Giants' ownership of the Millers gave them priority rights to a major league team in the area.

At this time, the Giants were approached by San Francisco mayor George Christopher. Despite objections from shareholders such as Joan Whitney Payson (who later owned the expansion Mets), majority owner Horace Stoneham entered into negotiations with San Francisco officials around the same time that Dodgers' owner Walter O'Malley was courting the city of Los Angeles. O'Malley had been told that the Dodgers would not be allowed to move to Los Angeles unless a second team moved to California as well. He pushed Stoneham toward relocation. In the summer of 1957, both the New York Giants and the Brooklyn Dodgers announced their moves to California, and the golden age of baseball in the New York area ended.

=== Season standings ===
National League
Team	W	L	Pct.	GB	Home	Road
Milwaukee Braves	95	59	.617	—	45‍–‍32	50‍–‍27
St. Louis Cardinals	87	67	.565	8	42‍–‍35	45‍–‍32
Brooklyn Dodgers	84	70	.545	11	43‍–‍34	41‍–‍36
Cincinnati Redlegs	80	74	.519	15	45‍–‍32	35‍–‍42
Philadelphia Phillies	77	77	.500	18	38‍–‍39	39‍–‍38
New York Giants	69	85	.448	26	37‍–‍40	32‍–‍45
Pittsburgh Pirates	62	92	.403	33	36‍–‍41	26‍–‍51
Chicago Cubs	62	92	.403	33	31‍–‍46	31‍–‍46

=== Record vs. opponents ===
1957 National League record Sources:
Team	BRO	CHC	CIN	MIL	NYG	PHI	PIT	STL
Brooklyn	—	17–5	12–10	10–12	12–10	9–13	12–10	12–10
Chicago	5–17	—	7–15	9–13	9–13	8–14–1	12–10–1	12–10
Cincinnati	10–12	15–7	—	4–18	12–10	16–6	14–8	9–13
Milwaukee	12–10	13–9	18–4	—	13–9	12–10–1	16–6	11–11
New York	10–12	13–9	10–12	9–13	—	10–12	9–13	8–14
Philadelphia	13–9	14–8–1	6–16	10–12–1	12–10	—	13–9	9–13
Pittsburgh	10–12	10–12–1	8–14	6–16	13–9	9–13	—	6–16
St. Louis	10–12	10–12	13–9	11–11	14–8	13–9	16–6	—

=== Notable transactions ===
- April 16, 1957: Dick Littlefield and Bob Lennon were traded by the Giants to the Chicago Cubs for Ray Katt and Ray Jablonski.
- June 15, 1957: Red Schoendienst was traded by the Giants to the Milwaukee Braves for Danny O'Connell, Ray Crone, and Bobby Thomson.

=== Roster ===
1957 New York Giants
Roster
Pitchers: 43 Johnny Antonelli; 39 Curt Barclay; 35 Pete Burnside; 46 Jim Constable; 49 Sandy Consuegra; 44 Ray Crone; 38 Jim Davis; 28 Rubén Gómez; 42 Marv Grissom; 47 Gordon Jones; 38 Joe Margoneri; 40 Windy McCall; 29 Mike McCormick; 23 Stu Miller; 41 Ramón Monzant; 44 Steve Ridzik; 36 Max Surkont; 32 Al Worthington	Catchers: 5 Ray Katt; 16 Valmy Thomas; 9 Wes Westrum; Infielders: 15 Ed Bressoud; 12 Foster Castleman; 14 Gail Harris; 10,46 Ray Jablonski; 25 Whitey Lockman; 2 Danny O'Connell; 15 Andre Rodgers; 7 Red Schoendienst; 20 Daryl Spencer; 17 Ozzie Virgil	Outfielders: 24 Willie Mays; 22 Don Mueller; 26 Dusty Rhodes; 6 Hank Sauer; 21 Bobby Thomson; Other batters: 23 Bobby Hofman; 21 Bill Taylor	Manager: 18 Bill Rigney; Coaches: 2,7 Tommy Henrich; -- Bill Sarni; 3 Bucky Walters; 1 Davey Williams

== Player stats ==
=== Batting ===
==== Starters by position ====
Note: Pos = Position; G = Games played; AB = At bats; H = Hits; Avg. = Batting average; HR = Home runs; RBI = Runs batted in

Pos	Player	G	AB	H	Avg.	HR	RBI
C	Valmy Thomas	88	241	60	.249	6	31
1B	Whitey Lockman	133	456	113	.248	7	30
2B	Danny O'Connell	95	364	97	.266	7	28
SS	Daryl Spencer	148	534	133	.249	11	50
3B	Ray Jablonski	107	305	88	.289	9	57
LF	Hank Sauer	127	378	98	.259	26	76
CF	Willie Mays	152	585	195	.333	35	97
RF	Don Mueller	135	450	116	.258	6	37

==== Other batters ====
Note: G = Games played; AB = At bats; H = Hits; Avg. = Batting average; HR = Home runs; RBI = Runs batted in

Player	G	AB	H	Avg.	HR	RBI
Red Schoendienst	57	254	78	.307	9	33
Ozzie Virgil Sr.	96	226	53	.235	4	24
Gail Harris	90	225	54	.240	9	31
Bobby Thomson	81	215	52	.242	8	38
Dusty Rhodes	92	190	39	.205	4	19
Ray Katt	72	165	38	.230	2	17
Ed Bressoud	49	127	34	.268	5	10
Wes Westrum	63	91	15	.165	1	2
Andre Rodgers	32	86	21	.244	3	9
Foster Castleman	14	37	6	.162	1	1
Bill Taylor	11	9	0	.000	0	0
Bobby Hofman	2	2	0	.000	0	0

=== Pitching ===
==== Starting pitchers ====
Note: G = Games pitched; IP = Innings pitched; W = Wins; L = Losses; ERA = Earned run average; SO = Strikeouts

Player	G	IP	W	L	ERA	SO
Rubén Gómez	38	238.1	15	13	3.78	92
Johnny Antonelli	40	212.1	12	18	3.77	144
Curt Barclay	37	183.0	9	9	3.44	67
Ray Crone	25	120.2	4	8	4.33	56
Pete Burnside	10	30.2	1	4	8.80	18

==== Other pitchers ====
Note: G = Games pitched; IP = Innings pitched; W = Wins; L = Losses; ERA = Earned run average; SO = Strikeouts

Player	G	IP	W	L	ERA	SO
Al Worthington	55	157.2	8	11	4.22	90
Stu Miller	38	124.0	7	9	3.63	60
Mike McCormick	24	74.2	3	1	4.10	50
Joe Margoneri	13	34.1	1	1	5.24	18

==== Relief pitchers ====
Note: G = Games pitched; W = Wins; L = Losses; SV = Saves; ERA = Earned run average; SO = Strikeouts

Player	G	W	L	SV	ERA	SO
Marv Grissom	55	4	4	14	2.61	51
Ramón Monzant	24	3	2	0	3.99	37
Jim Constable	16	1	1	0	2.86	13
Steve Ridzik	15	0	2	0	4.73	13
Gordon Jones	10	0	1	0	6.17	5
Jim Davis	10	1	0	0	6.55	6
Max Surkont	5	0	1	0	9.95	8
Windy McCall	5	0	0	0	15.00	2
Sandy Consuegra	4	0	0	0	2.45	1

== Awards and honors ==
=== League leaders ===
- Willie Mays, National League leader, triples, (20).

== Farm system ==
Level	Team	League	Manager
AAA	Minneapolis Millers	American Association	Red Davis
AA	Dallas Eagles	Texas League	Salty Parker
A	Springfield Giants	Eastern League	Mike McCormick and Ray Murray
B	Danville Leafs	Carolina League	Dave Garcia and Mike McCormick
C	St. Cloud Rox	Northern League	Pete Pavlick
D	Selma Cloverleafs	Alabama–Florida League	Buddy Kerr
D	Michigan City White Caps	Midwest League	Richie Klaus
D	Hastings Giants	Nebraska State League	Leo Schrall
D	Muskogee Giants	Sooner State League	Andy Gilbert
