= 1957 Milwaukee Braves season =

Major League Baseball season

1957 Milwaukee Braves
- World Series champions National League champions
- League: National League
- Ballpark: Milwaukee County Stadium
- City: Milwaukee, Wisconsin
- Record: 95–59 (.617)
- League place: 1st
- Owners: Louis R. Perini
- General managers: John J. Quinn
- Managers: Fred Haney
- Radio: WEMP; WTMJ (Earl Gillespie, Blaine Walsh)

The 1957 Milwaukee Braves season was the 87th season of the Braves franchise and their fifth in Milwaukee. It was the year that the team won its first and only World Series championship while based in Milwaukee. The Braves had a record of 95-59, winning the National League pennant by eight games over the second-place St. Louis Cardinals. It would be their best season during the duration of their 13-year tenure in Wisconsin. In the World Series, the Braves defeated the New York Yankees in seven games, with Milwaukee pitcher Lew Burdette being named Series MVP after winning all three of his starts.

The 1957 Braves were the only Milwaukee-based club to win the World Series for 69 years, until the Milwaukee Brewers won their first championship in franchise history in 2026.

== Offseason ==
- October 15, 1956: Jack Daniels and cash were traded by the Braves to the Toronto Maple Leafs for Carl Sawatski.
- December 3, 1956: Roger McCardell was drafted from the Braves by the New York Giants in the 1956 minor league draft.
- Prior to 1957 season (exact date unknown)
  - Marshall Bridges was acquired from the Braves by the Sacramento Solons.
  - Merritt Ranew was signed as an amateur free agent by the Braves.

== Regular season ==
=== Season summary ===
The Braves finished the regular season with a 95–59 record, and they scored 772 runs while giving up 613. They played their home games in Milwaukee County Stadium, where they sold just over 2,220,000 tickets, the highest in the National League.

==== Offense ====
The Braves were led on offense by right fielder Hank Aaron, who won the National League Most Valuable Player award in just his fourth year in the majors. Fielding well in 151 games in right field, Aaron also led the National League with 118 runs scored, 44 home runs, a career high of 132 runs batted in, and 369 total bases. He also struck out just 58 times. Aaron also finished high in the league standings with 198 hits, a .322 batting average, and a .600 slugging percentage.

Another offensive star was third baseman Eddie Mathews. On June 12, Mathews hit the 200th home run of his career. For the season, Matthews was second on the team with 167 hits, 109 runs scored, 32 home runs, 94 runs batted in, and 148 games played.

In addition, the Braves' new second baseman, Red Schoendienst, was acquired in a trade on June 15, and he played in 93 games. Given up in this trade were Bobby Thomson (who was batting just .236) and Danny O'Connell (who was batting just .235). Wes Covington was the main replacement for Thomson in left field. Covington played in 96 games, batted .284, and batted in 65 runs, third on the team.

Del Crandall was the Braves' catcher in 118 of the 154 games. Del Rice was his primary backup, and he played in 54 games, including pinch-hitting.

==== Pitching ====
Starting pitcher Warren Spahn was the Cy Young Award winner as the best pitcher in Major League Baseball, the first left-handed pitcher to win the award. Spahn finished with 35 games started with a 21–11 record. He also relieved in four games, saving three of those. Spahn led the National League with 21 wins and 18 complete games, and he had a 2.69 earned-run average in 271 innings pitched. Spahn was backed up by starters Bob Buhl (18–7) and Lew Burdette (17–9).

==== Manager ====
Fred Haney, coming off his good performance in 1956, managed the Braves for the entire season in 1957. Haney also led the Braves to the top of the regular-season standings in 1958 and 1959, including the 1958 World Series, but after 1959, he never managed another Major League team again, although he did become the general manager of the Los Angeles Angels.

==== Injuries ====
The Braves overcame two serious injuries during the 1957 season that caused some players to miss large parts of the year. First baseman Joe Adcock was injured in mid-season, and only played in 65 games, in which he batted in 38 runs. Frank Torre filled in for him and batted .272 in 129 games. Center fielder Bill Bruton injured his knee after playing in just 79 games, missing the rest of the season. He was replaced by Andy Pafko, who played in 83 games.

=== Opening Day lineup ===
Danny O'Connell	2B
Hank Aaron	RF
Eddie Mathews	3B
Joe Adcock	1B
Bobby Thomson	LF
Johnny Logan	SS
Bill Bruton	CF
Del Crandall	C
Warren Spahn	P

=== Notable transactions ===
- June 15, 1957: Danny O'Connell, Ray Crone, and Bobby Thomson were traded by the Braves to the New York Giants for Red Schoendienst.

=== Season standings ===
National League
Team	W	L	Pct.	GB	Home	Road
Milwaukee Braves	95	59	.617	—	45‍–‍32	50‍–‍27
St. Louis Cardinals	87	67	.565	8	42‍–‍35	45‍–‍32
Brooklyn Dodgers	84	70	.545	11	43‍–‍34	41‍–‍36
Cincinnati Redlegs	80	74	.519	15	45‍–‍32	35‍–‍42
Philadelphia Phillies	77	77	.500	18	38‍–‍39	39‍–‍38
New York Giants	69	85	.448	26	37‍–‍40	32‍–‍45
Pittsburgh Pirates	62	92	.403	33	36‍–‍41	26‍–‍51
Chicago Cubs	62	92	.403	33	31‍–‍46	31‍–‍46

=== Record vs. opponents ===
1957 National League record Sources:
Team	BRO	CHC	CIN	MIL	NYG	PHI	PIT	STL
Brooklyn	—	17–5	12–10	10–12	12–10	9–13	12–10	12–10
Chicago	5–17	—	7–15	9–13	9–13	8–14–1	12–10–1	12–10
Cincinnati	10–12	15–7	—	4–18	12–10	16–6	14–8	9–13
Milwaukee	12–10	13–9	18–4	—	13–9	12–10–1	16–6	11–11
New York	10–12	13–9	10–12	9–13	—	10–12	9–13	8–14
Philadelphia	13–9	14–8–1	6–16	10–12–1	12–10	—	13–9	9–13
Pittsburgh	10–12	10–12–1	8–14	6–16	13–9	9–13	—	6–16
St. Louis	10–12	10–12	13–9	11–11	14–8	13–9	16–6	—

=== Roster ===
1957 Milwaukee Braves
Roster
Pitchers: 10 Bob Buhl; 33 Lew Burdette; 22 Gene Conley; 20 Ray Crone; 42 Joey Jay; 32 Ernie Johnson; 16 Dave Jolly; 20 Don McMahon; 19 Red Murff; 24 Phil Paine; 17 Taylor Phillips; 34 Juan Pizarro; 21 Warren Spahn; 30 Bob Trowbridge	Catchers: 1 Del Crandall; 7 Del Rice; 15 Carl Sawatski; 19 Hawk Taylor; Infielders: 9 Joe Adcock; 12 Dick Cole; 6 Harry Hanebrink; 25 Nippy Jones; 23 Johnny Logan; 29 Bobby Malkmus; 5 Félix Mantilla; 41 Eddie Mathews; 4 Danny O'Connell; 12,29 Mel Roach; 4 Red Schoendienst; 14 Frank Torre	Outfielders: 44 Hank Aaron; 38 Bill Bruton; 43 Wes Covington; 18 John DeMerit; 29,12 Bob Hazle; 48 Andy Pafko; 56 Ray Shearer; 18 Chuck Tanner; 25 Bobby Thomson	Manager: 2 Fred Haney; Coaches: 35 Bob Keely; 3 Johnny Riddle; 31 Charlie Root; 8 Connie Ryan

== Player stats ==
= Indicates team leader

= Indicates league leader

=== Batting ===
==== Starters by position ====
Note: Pos = Position; G = Games played; AB = At bats; H = Hits; Avg. = Batting average; HR = Home runs; RBI = Runs batted in

Pos	Player	G	AB	H	Avg.	HR	RBI
C	Del Crandall	118	383	97	.253	15	46
1B	Frank Torre	129	364	99	.272	5	40
2B	Red Schoendienst	93	394	122	.310	6	32
3B	Eddie Mathews	148	572	167	.292	32	94
SS	Johnny Logan	129	494	135	.273	10	49
LF	Wes Covington	96	328	93	.284	21	65
CF	Bill Bruton	79	306	85	.278	5	30
RF	Hank Aaron	151	615	198	.322	44	132

==== Other batters ====
Note: G = Games played; AB = At bats; H = Hits; Avg. = Batting average; HR = Home runs; RBI = Runs batted in

Player	G	AB	H	Avg.	HR	RBI
Andy Pafko	83	220	61	.277	8	27
Joe Adcock	65	209	60	.287	12	38
Danny O'Connell	48	183	43	.235	1	8
Félix Mantilla	71	182	43	.236	4	21
Bobby Thomson	41	148	35	.236	4	23
Del Rice	54	144	33	.229	9	20
Bob Hazle	41	134	54	.403	7	27
Carl Sawatski	58	105	25	.238	2	17
Nippy Jones	30	79	21	.266	2	8
Chuck Tanner	22	69	17	.246	2	6
John DeMerit	33	34	5	.147	0	1
Bobby Malkmus	13	22	2	.091	0	0
Dick Cole	15	14	1	.077	0	0
Harry Hanebrink	6	7	2	.286	0	0
Mel Roach	7	6	1	.167	0	0
Ray Shearer	2	2	1	.500	0	0
Hawk Taylor	7	1	0	.000	0	0

=== Pitching ===
==== Starting pitchers ====
Note: G = Games pitched; IP = Innings pitched; W = Wins; L = Losses; ERA = Earned run average; SO = Strikeouts

Player	G	IP	W	L	ERA	SO
Warren Spahn	39	271.0	21	11	2.69	78
Lew Burdette	37	256.2	17	9	3.71	111
Bob Buhl	34	216.2	18	7	2.74	117

==== Other pitchers ====
Note: G = Games pitched; IP = Innings pitched; W = Wins; L = Losses; ERA = Earned run average; SO = Strikeouts

Player	G	IP	W	L	ERA	SO
Gene Conley	35	148.0	9	9	3.16	61
Bob Trowbridge	32	126.0	7	5	3.64	75
Juan Pizarro	24	99.1	5	6	4.62	68
Ray Crone	11	42.1	3	1	4.46	15

==== Relief pitchers ====
Note: G = Games pitched; W = Wins; L = Losses; SV = Saves; ERA = Earned run average; SO = Strikeouts

Player	G	W	L	SV	ERA	SO
Don McMahon	32	2	3	8	1.54	46
Ernie Johnson	30	7	3	4	3.88	44
Taylor Phillips	27	3	2	2	5.55	36
Dave Jolly	23	1	1	1	5.02	27
Red Murff	12	2	2	2	4.85	13
Phil Paine	1	0	0	0	0.00	2
Joey Jay	1	0	0	0	0.00	0

== 1957 World Series ==
This was the Braves' first World Championship since the "Miracle Braves" of 1914, and their only one while based in Milwaukee (out of two chances). To date, the Braves' have won two World Championships: one in the 1995 World Series, when the now-Atlanta Braves defeated the Cleveland Indians, and the second in the 2021 World Series, when Atlanta defeated the Houston Astros.

World Series MVP Lew Burdette won two games in Yankee Stadium and one game in Milwaukee County Stadium. Warren Spahn had the other Braves's victory.

=== Summary ===
NL Milwaukee Braves (4) vs. AL New York Yankees (3)

Game	Score	Date	Location	Attendance
1	Braves – 1, Yankees – 3	October 2	Yankee Stadium	69,476
2	Braves – 4, Yankees – 2	October 3	Yankee Stadium	65,202
3	Yankees – 12, Braves – 3	October 5	Milwaukee County Stadium	45,804
4	Yankees – 5, Braves – 7 (10 innings)	October 6	Milwaukee County Stadium	45,804
5	Yankees – 0, Braves – 1	October 7	Milwaukee County Stadium	45,811
6	Braves – 2, Yankees – 3	October 9	Yankee Stadium	61,408
7	Braves – 5, Yankees – 0	October 10	Yankee Stadium	61,207

=== Composite line score ===
1957 World Series (4–3): Milwaukee Braves (N.L.) over New York Yankees (A.L.)

Team	1	2	3	4	5	6	7	8	9	10	R	H	E
Milwaukee Braves	0	2	5	6	3	1	2	1	0	3	23	47	3
New York Yankees	4	1	5	2	1	2	6	0	3	1	25	57	6
Total Attendance: 394,712 Average Attendance: 56,387
Winning Player's Share: – $8,924 Losing Player's Share – $5,606

== Awards and honors ==
- Hank Aaron, National League Most Valuable Player
- Warren Spahn, starting pitcher, the Major League Baseball Cy Young Award

=== World Series awards ===
- Lew Burdette, World Series Most Valuable Player
- Lew Burdette, Babe Ruth Award

=== All-Stars ===
1957 Major League Baseball All-Star Game

- Hank Aaron, OF, starter
- Lew Burdette, P, reserve
- Johnny Logan, IF, reserve
- Eddie Mathews, IF, reserve
- Red Schoendienst, IF, reserve
- Warren Spahn, P, reserve

== Farm system ==
Level	Team	League	Manager
AAA	Wichita Braves	American Association	Ben Geraghty
AA	Atlanta Crackers	Southern Association	Bud Bates
AA	Austin Senators	Texas League	Sibby Sisti
A	Jacksonville Braves	Sally League	Mickey Owen, Grady Wilson and Joe Just
A	Topeka Hawks	Western League	Red Smith and Bill Dossey
B	Corpus Christi Clippers	Big State League	Joe Just and Jack Wilkinson
B	Evansville Braves	Illinois–Indiana–Iowa League	Bob Coleman
C	Salinas Packers	California League	Leo Thomas and Bill Krueger
C	Eau Claire Braves	Northern League	Gordon Maltzberger
C	Boise Braves	Pioneer League	George McQuinn
D	Leesburg Braves	Florida State League	Tommy Giordano
D	Waycross Braves	Georgia–Florida League	Mike Fandozzi
D	McCook Braves	Nebraska State League	Bill Steinecke
D	Wellsville Braves	New York–Penn League	Alex Monchak
D	Lawton Braves	Sooner State League	Travis Jackson

LEAGUE CHAMPIONS: Atlanta, Evansville, Salinas
