= Glen Gorbous =

Canadian baseball player (1930-1990)

- Outfielder
- Born: July 8, 1930; Drumheller, Alberta, Canada
- Died: June 12, 1990 (aged 59); Calgary, Alberta, Canada
- Batted: Left Threw: Right

MLB debut
- April 11, 1955, for the Cincinnati Redlegs

Last MLB appearance
- May 5, 1957, for the Philadelphia Phillies

MLB statistics
- Batting average: .238
- Home runs: 4
- Runs batted in: 29
- Stats at Baseball Reference

Teams
- Cincinnati Redlegs (1955); Philadelphia Phillies (1955–1957)

Glen Edward Gorbous (July 8, 1930 – June 12, 1990) was a Canadian professional baseball outfielder, who played in Major League Baseball (MLB) for the Cincinnati Redlegs, in early 1955, and the Philadelphia Phillies, from mid-1955 to May, 1957.

Gorbous holds the current world record for longest throw of a baseball, 135.89m (445 feet, 10 inches). The feat took place on August 1, 1957, while he was playing for the Omaha Cardinals of the American Association. In an exhibition he was given a six-step running start and threw the ball from the far right field corner of the stadium to the far left field corner. (Gorbous' world record was set after his brief major league baseball career had already ended.)
