= Rod Miller (baseball) =

American baseball player (1940–2013)

- Pinch hitter
- Born: January 16, 1940; Portland, Oregon, U.S.
- Died: November 8, 2013 (aged 73); Cascade, Idaho, U.S.
- Batted: Left Threw: Right

MLB debut
- September 28, 1957, for the Brooklyn Dodgers

Last MLB appearance
- September 28, 1957, for the Brooklyn Dodgers

MLB statistics
- Batting average: .000
- Home runs: 0
- Runs scored: 0
- Stats at Baseball Reference

Teams
- Brooklyn Dodgers (1957)

Rodney Carter Miller (January 16, 1940 – November 8, 2013) was an American professional baseball player who played in one game in Major League Baseball for the 1957 Brooklyn Dodgers when he was 17 years old. Born in Portland, Oregon, he signed with Brooklyn after graduating from high school in Lynwood, California. A second baseman and third baseman by trade, he batted left-handed and threw right-handed, stood 5 feet 10 inches (1.78 m) tall and weighed 160 pounds (73 kg).

Miller had spent 1957 in the Class C Illinois–Indiana–Iowa League before his recall to the Dodgers after rosters were expanded to 40 men post-September 1. In his one MLB game, on September 28, 1957, he pinch hit for Randy Jackson in the top of the ninth inning against relief pitcher Jack Meyer of the Philadelphia Phillies, and struck out. The game, played at Connie Mack Stadium, was won by the Dodgers 8–4. It was the second-to-last game in Brooklyn Dodger history. Weeks after the 1957 regular season ended on September 29, the team moved to Los Angeles for the 1958 campaign.

Although the Dodgers' new home was minutes from Miller's high school alma mater, he never again appeared for them after 1957. Miller played three more years in the lower reaches of the Dodgers' farm system, leaving baseball after the 1960 campaign to join the United States Marine Corps, where he served for four years. He lived for 21 years in Reno, Nevada, before retiring to Cascade, Idaho, in 2009.
