= Bobby Durnbaugh =

American baseball player (1933–2023)

- Shortstop
- Born: January 15, 1933; Dayton, Ohio, U.S.
- Died: September 20, 2023 (aged 90); Dayton, Ohio, U.S.
- Batted: Right Threw: Right

MLB debut
- September 22, 1957, for the Cincinnati Redlegs

Last MLB appearance
- September 27, 1957, for the Cincinnati Redlegs

MLB statistics
- Batting average: .000
- Games played: 2
- At bats: 1
- Stats at Baseball Reference

Teams
- Cincinnati Redlegs (1957)

Robert Eugene Durnbaugh (January 15, 1933 – September 20, 2023) was an American Major League Baseball player. He played in two games at shortstop for the Cincinnati Redlegs in 1957, and grounded out in his only major league at-bat.

== Early life ==
Bobby Durnbaugh was born in Dayton, Ohio, on January 15, 1933 to Ray and Helen Durnbaugh. They lived in Knollwood on Central Drive. His siblings were Marilyn and Jack He graduated from Beavercreek High School. in nearby now Beavercreek, Ohio.

== Later life and death ==
Following baseball Durnbaugh spent 40 years in sporting goods sales. He died in Dayton on September 20, 2023, at the age of 90.
