= Gordon Massa =

American baseball player (1935–2016)

- Catcher
- Born: September 2, 1935; Cincinnati, Ohio, U.S.
- Died: July 16, 2016 (aged 80); Cincinnati, Ohio, U.S.
- Batted: Left Threw: Right

MLB debut
- September 24, 1957, for the Chicago Cubs

Last MLB appearance
- September 14, 1958, for the Chicago Cubs

MLB statistics
- Batting average: .417
- Home runs: 0
- Runs batted in: 3
- Stats at Baseball Reference

Teams
- Chicago Cubs (1957–1958)

Gordon Richard Massa (September 2, 1935 – July 16, 2016) was an American professional baseball player who appeared in eight games as a catcher and pinch hitter for the 1957–1958 Chicago Cubs of Major League Baseball. A left-handed batter who threw right-handed, he stood 6 feet 3 inches (1.91 m) tall and weighed 210 pounds (95 kg).

After graduating from Elder High School in Cincinnati, Massa attended The College of the Holy Cross, where he starred in baseball and football. In 1955 he led the Crusaders in home runs and runs batted in as the team posted a 13–4 record and qualified for the NCAA Division I College baseball tournament. Overall, Holy Cross won 42 of 53 games during Massa's time on the varsity. In football, he played center and linebacker and was selected by the New York Giants in the tenth round of the 1957 National Football League Draft.

But Massa chose professional baseball as his destination and signed with the Cubs on June 24, 1957. Three months later, after prepping with the Des Moines Bruins of the Class A Western League, Massa made his MLB debut, starting at catcher and notching two hits, both singles, in four at bats with one run batted in against Hal Jeffcoat of the Cincinnati Redlegs. All told, Massa collected seven hits in 15 at-bats with three RBI during his first trial with the Cubs. The following year, he was sent to the Class B Illinois–Indiana–Iowa League for further minor league seasoning, and he batted .316 to earn his second late-season call-up to the Cubs. He went hitless in two at-bats.

Massa returned to the minors for good in 1959, and retired in late 1963 after seven seasons in the Cub farm system, pitching in 24 games as well as handling catching chores.

He was elected to the Holy Cross Athletic Hall of Fame in 2005.

Massa died July 16, 2016, aged 80, in Cincinnati.
