= Frank Ernaga =

American baseball player (1930–2018)

- Outfielder
- Born: August 22, 1930; Susanville, California, U.S.
- Died: April 30, 2018 (aged 87); Susanville, California, U.S.
- Batted: Right Threw: Right

MLB debut
- May 24, 1957, for the Chicago Cubs

Last MLB appearance
- September 21, 1958, for the Chicago Cubs

MLB statistics
- Batting average: .279
- Home runs: 2
- Runs batted in: 7
- Stats at Baseball Reference

Teams
- Chicago Cubs (1957–1958)

Frank John Ernaga (August 22, 1930 – April 30, 2018) was an American professional baseball player. An outfielder, he played in 29 games in Major League Baseball during portions of the 1957 and 1958 seasons for the Chicago Cubs. The native of Susanville, California, had a seven-season (1953–1959) pro career.

Ernaga threw and batted right-handed, stood 6 feet 1 inch (1.85 m) tall and weighed 195 pounds (88 kg). He attended Lassen Community College and the University of California, Los Angeles. In his MLB debut for the Cubs on May 24, 1957, Ernaga hit a home run against Baseball Hall of Fame pitcher Warren Spahn in his first Major League at-bat. Then, in his second plate appearance, he tripled off Spahn, as the Cubs won, 5–1, at Wrigley Field. In his first 11 at bats with the Cubs, through May 28, Ernaga had six hits (.545). However, he leveled off, and by June 11, his average had dropped to .320. He returned to the minor leagues until after September 1. But he collected only four more hits in 18 at bats during the remainder of his career with the Cubs, from late-season 1957 through the early weeks of 1958.

All told, as a major leaguer, Ernaga collected 12 hits (with three doubles, two triples and two homers) and seven runs batted in. He batted .279.
