= Curt Barclay =

American baseball player (1931-1985)

- Pitcher
- Born: August 22, 1931; Chicago, Illinois, U.S.
- Died: March 25, 1985 (aged 53); Missoula, Montana, U.S.
- Batted: Right Threw: Right

MLB debut
- April 21, 1957, for the New York Giants

Last MLB appearance
- April 16, 1959, for the San Francisco Giants

MLB statistics
- Win–loss record: 10–9
- Earned run average: 3.48
- Strikeouts: 73
- Stats at Baseball Reference

Teams
- New York / San Francisco Giants (1957–1959)

Curtis Cordell Barclay (August 22, 1931 – March 25, 1985) was an American professional baseball player. A right-handed pitcher, Barclay appeared in 44 games in Major League Baseball for the New York / San Francisco Giants between 1957 and 1959. In his only full season in MLB, in 1957, he was a member of the pitching staff of the final Giants team to represent New York, working in 37 games, 28 as a starting pitcher, and posting a 9–9 won–lost record. His 3.44 earned run average led Giants' starters and he pitched two shutouts, back-to-back blankings of the Brooklyn Dodgers (August 6) and Philadelphia Phillies (August 11). They would be the only shutouts of Barclay's MLB career.

A native of Chicago, the 6 ft 3 in (1.91 m), 210 pounds (95 kg) Barclay signed with the Giants in 1952 after attending the University of Oregon, where he played baseball and basketball. He posted 19, 16, and 15-win seasons in three seasons of minor league baseball, losing 11 games as well each year, before joining the Giants as a rookie in 1957.

However, that would be Barclay's only full year with the Giants. Hampered by a sore shoulder, he split the 1958 and 1959 seasons between San Francisco and its top farm club, the Phoenix Giants, and he retired after the 1960 minor league campaign. Barclay's final Major League record was 10–9 (3.48) with 73 strikeouts and 55 bases on balls in 1991/3 innings, allowing 214 hits. He registered five complete games and one save.

Barclay died from cancer at age 53 in Missoula, Montana.
