= Buddy Pritchard =

American baseball player (born 1936)

- Shortstop / Second baseman
- Born: January 25, 1936 (age 90); South Gate, California, U.S.
- Batted: Right Threw: Right

MLB debut
- April 21, 1957, for the Pittsburgh Pirates

Last MLB appearance
- September 21, 1957, for the Pittsburgh Pirates

MLB statistics
- Batting average: .091
- Home runs: 0
- Runs batted in: 0
- Stats at Baseball Reference

Teams
- Pittsburgh Pirates (1957)

Harold William "Buddy" Pritchard (born January 25, 1936) is an American former professional baseball player and manager. A shortstop and second baseman, he was signed by the Pittsburgh Pirates as a $30,000 "bonus baby" after college baseball stardom at the University of Southern California, but the Bonus Rule then in effect in Major League Baseball kept him on the Pirate roster for his entire rookie season, 1957. Pritchard appeared in only 23 games, with 11 at bats and one hit, a single, for an .091 batting average. Pritchard's lone safety came on May 28 against Don Newcombe of the Brooklyn Dodgers at Forbes Field; it would be his only hit and his only year in the Major Leagues.

Pritchard was born in South Gate, California. He threw and batted right-handed and had a powerful build for a 1950s shortstop, standing 6 feet 1 inch (1.85 m) tall and weighing 195 pounds (88 kg). He had been a batting star for the USC Trojans — batting .385 in 1956 to lead the team and being named a third team All-American and a member of the All-Pacific Coast and California Collegiate Baseball Association all-star teams. The Pirates outbid 11 of the other 16 Major League teams then in existence for his services.

But the inactivity forced by the Bonus Rule may have damaged Pritchard's chances of becoming a Major League star, or everyday player. He was sent to minor league baseball in 1958, and played eight seasons in the Pirate farm system, batting .256, then managed Rookie-level affiliates in the Pittsburgh minor-league organization through the late 1960s. He later scouted for the Pirates, Chicago Cubs and the Major League Scouting Bureau.

In July 1957, Pritchard enlisted with fellow player Bill Mazeroski in the U.S. Army Reserve, serving in the 773rd Artillery Battalion.

== See also ==
- List of baseball players who went directly to Major League Baseball
