= Ed Mayer (pitcher) =

American baseball player (1931–2015)

- Pitcher
- Born: November 30, 1931; San Francisco, California, U.S.
- Died: December 29, 2015 (aged 84); Corte Madera, California, U.S.
- Batted: Left Threw: Left

MLB debut
- September 15, 1957, for the Chicago Cubs

Last MLB appearance
- June 5, 1958, for the Chicago Cubs

MLB statistics
- Win–loss record: 2–2
- Earned run average: 4.31
- Strikeouts: 17
- Stats at Baseball Reference

Teams
- Chicago Cubs (1957–1958)

Edwin David Mayer (November 30, 1931 – December 29, 2015) was an American professional baseball pitcher. A 6 ft 2 in (1.88 m) left-hander, Mayer was Jewish. He played parts of two seasons in Major League Baseball for the Chicago Cubs in 1957 and 1958. He also pitched in the minor leagues from 1952 to 1959.

== Early life ==
Prior to playing professionally, he attended Lowell High School in San Francisco. After graduating from Lowell in 1950, Ed attended the University of California at Berkeley, where he played baseball for two seasons. An all-around athlete, Ed peaked with a one-hitter against Santa Clara on May 4, 1952, and he went 2-for-4 to help Cal-Berkeley win, 1–0. After his college experience, Mayer signed with the Boston Red Sox.

== Baseball career ==
Mayer spent six seasons in the minor leagues, and he split the 1952 season between San Jose of the California League and Yuma of the Southwest International League, winning one game for each team. The Red Sox kept him at San Jose in 1953, and Mayer produced a 17–8 record. In 1954 he won 17 games for Greensboro of the Class B Carolina League, and in 1955 he went 11–7 for Montgomery of the Class A Sally League. Drafted by the St. Louis Cardinals after the season, Mayer split the 1956 season between Omaha of the American Association, where he was 6–5, and Rochester of the International League, where he won one game in five decisions. After two games at Omaha in 1957, Mayer spent the rest of the season at Double-A Fort Worth of the Texas League, where he started 26 times, pitched nine complete games, posted three shutouts, and finished with an 8–13 record with a 4.04 ERA.

Mayer was called up by the Cubs, and he made his major league debut at Wrigley Field against the New York Giants on September 15, 1957. Ed pitched five innings, leaving with the score 5–3 in favor of the Giants after Hank Sauer belted a three-run homer in the fifth. Mayer got no decision. Instead, the Cubs scored four more runs, Don Elston racked up the 7–6 win in relief, and Turk Lown got a save. Mayer appeared in relief in two more games that September, going 0–0 with a 5.87 ERA.

In 1958 Mayer pitched in relief in 19 games for the Cubs, and he was 2–2 with a 3.80 ERA. Relying on his sinking fastball, he pitched 23.2 innings, allowed 15 hits and 12 runs, 10 of them earned. On June 5, 1958, in his final big league appearance against the Philadelphia Phillies, he faced two batters, hitting the first and yielding a three-run double in what became a 7–6 loss. Mayer's arm was sore, he lost some of the zip on his fastball, and he was sent to Omaha, where he posted no record. Overall, Mayer went 2–2 with a 4.31 ERA in 22 big league games. He pitched at Portland of the Pacific Coast League in 1958, posting a 2–6 mark in 21 games, and in 1959 he was 0–4 at Denver of the American Association in 10 games.

Mayer fashioned a 64–59 record in 202 games in his eight-year minor league career. In both 1953 and 1954, he produced records of 17–8.

Mayer died of cancer in Corte Madera, California on December 29, 2015.
