= Brooks Lawrence =

American baseball player (1925–2000)

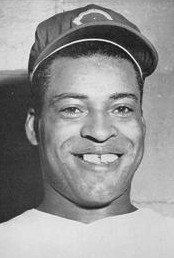
- Lawrence in 1957
- Pitcher
- Born: January 30, 1925; Springfield, Ohio, U.S.
- Died: April 27, 2000 (aged 75); Springfield, Ohio, U.S.
- Batted: Right Threw: Right

MLB debut
- June 24, 1954, for the St. Louis Cardinals

Last MLB appearance
- May 1, 1960, for the Cincinnati Reds

MLB statistics
- Win–loss record: 69–62
- Earned run average: 4.25
- Strikeouts: 481
- Stats at Baseball Reference

Teams
- St. Louis Cardinals (1954–1955); Cincinnati Redlegs / Reds (1956–1960)

Career highlights and awards
- All-Star (1956); Cincinnati Reds Hall of Fame

Brooks Ulysses Lawrence (January 30, 1925 – April 27, 2000) was an American Major League Baseball All-Star pitcher for the St. Louis Cardinals (1954–1955), Cincinnati Redlegs (1956–1959), and Cincinnati Reds (1960).

Lawrence was born in Springfield, Ohio, and served in the US Army during World War II. He enrolled at Miami University in Oxford, Ohio in 1947, and played two seasons of college baseball before being signed to a professional contract by the Cleveland Indians.

Lawrence's Major League debut came in 1954. As a 29-year-old rookie, Lawrence went 15–6 with a 3.74 ERA while starting and relieving for the St. Louis Cardinals. He struggled in 1955 and was demoted to Oakland (in the Pacific Coast League), but he went 5–1 down the stretch and earned a second chance with the big-league club.

Lawrence's best season came in 1956. Before that year, St. Louis sent Lawrence and Sonny Senerchia to the Cincinnati Reds in exchange for Jackie Collum. With the Reds that season, Lawrence posted a 19–10 record and a 3.99 ERA. He opened the season with 13 consecutive wins and earned a spot on the National League All-Star team. That year he led the Reds in wins, innings pitched and shutouts.

Lawrence's career came to a close in 1960, and he retired with an overall record of 69–62 with a 4.25 ERA in 1,040 2/3 innings pitched. Due largely to his 13-game winning streak and his association with the surprisingly successful 1956 Reds club, Lawrence earned induction into the Cincinnati Reds Hall of Fame in 1976.

After he retired from baseball, Lawrence worked for International Harvester in his hometown of Springfield, Ohio. He later worked for the Reds in scouting, minor-league player development, and radio and television.

Lawrence died on April 27, 2000.
