= Raúl Sánchez (baseball) =

Cuban baseball player (1930–2002)

- Pitcher
- Born: December 12, 1930; Marianao, Cuba
- Died: June 30, 2002 (aged 71); Pembroke Pines, Florida, U.S.
- Batted: Switch Threw: Right

MLB debut
- April 17, 1952, for the Washington Senators

Last MLB appearance
- May 17, 1960, for the Cincinnati Reds

MLB statistics
- Win–loss record: 5–3
- Strikeouts: 48
- Earned run average: 4.62
- Stats at Baseball Reference

Teams
- Washington Senators (1952); Cincinnati Redlegs (1957); Cincinnati Reds (1960)

Raúl Guadalupe Sánchez Rodríguez (December 12, 1930 – June 30, 2002) was a Cuban middle relief pitcher in Major League Baseball who played for two different teams between the 1952 and 1960 seasons. Listed at 6' 0", 150 lb., Sánchez batted and threw right-handed. He was born in Marianao, Cuba.

The skinny, hard thrower Sánchez was 21 years old when he entered the majors in 1952 with the Washington Senators, playing for them one year before joining the Cincinnati Redlegs/Reds (1957/1960). His most productive season came in 1957, when he posted career-highs in games (38), wins (3), saves (5), strikeouts (37) and innings pitched (62.1). He also pitched for the 1954 Havana Sugar Kings of the International League.

His nickname in Spanish was "Salivita", which translates roughly as "a little saliva", a reference to Sanchez's reputation for throwing a spitball.

In a three-season career, Sánchez posted a 5–3 record with a 4.62 ERA and five saves in 49 appearances, including two starts and one shutout, giving up 46 earned runs on 86 hits and 43 walks while striking out 48 in 89 2/3 innings of work.

Sánchez died in Pembroke Pines, Florida, at the age of 71.

== See also ==
- List of Major League Baseball players from Cuba
