= Dave Skaugstad =

American baseball player (born 1940)

- Pitcher
- Born: January 10, 1940; Algona, Iowa, U.S.
- Died: July 16, 2023 (aged 83); Desert Hot Springs, California, U.S.
- Batted: Left Threw: Left

MLB debut
- September 25, 1957, for the Cincinnati Redlegs

Last MLB appearance
- September 29, 1957, for the Cincinnati Redlegs

MLB statistics
- Win–loss record: 0–0
- Earned run average: 1.59
- Strikeouts: 4
- Stats at Baseball Reference

Teams
- Cincinnati Redlegs (1957)

David Wendell Skaugstad (January 10, 1940 – July 16, 2023) was an American Major League Baseball pitcher. The left-hander appeared in two games for the Cincinnati Redlegs during the 1957 season. He was listed as 6 feet 1 inch (1.85 m) tall and 179 pounds (81 kg). He was also the first person born in the 1940s to make his MLB debut.

Born in Algona, Iowa, and a graduate of Compton High School in Southern California, Skaugstad was signed by the Redlegs on September 7, 1957, at the age of 17. His first MLB appearance came just 18 days later, on September 25, at Crosley Field in Cincinnati. He entered the game in the top of the sixth inning with the Reds trailing the Chicago Cubs, 7–2. He pitched four shutout innings, giving up three hits and three walks while striking out four batters.

Four days later, he made his second and last appearance in the majors, facing the Milwaukee Braves at County Stadium. He entered the game in the bottom of the sixth inning in a scoreless game. He pitched a flawless sixth inning, but ran into trouble in the next frame, giving up one hit, three bases on balls, and one run. In the 5 2/3 innings that he pitched in the major leagues, Skaugstad faced four future Hall of Famers: Ernie Banks, Eddie Mathews, Red Schoendienst and Hank Aaron.

After that game, Skaugstad never pitched in another MLB game. In his 5 2/3 MLB innings pitched, he faced 27 hitters, allowed four hits, six bases on balls, and one earned run; he struck out four.

In 1958, he was assigned to the minors, where he pitched for the Visalia Redlegs and Wenatchee Chiefs. He continued to pitch professionally until 1965, although he missed the 1961–63 seasons while in the military. After debuting at age 17, Skaugstad's career was finished at the age of just 25.
