= Von McDaniel =

American baseball player (1939–1995)

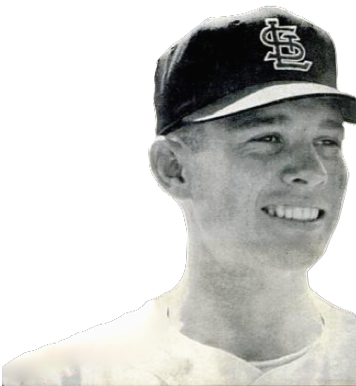
- McDaniel in 1958
- Pitcher
- Born: April 18, 1939; Hollis, Oklahoma, U.S.
- Died: August 20, 1995 (aged 56); Lawton, Oklahoma, U.S.
- Batted: Right Threw: Right

MLB debut
- June 13, 1957, for the St. Louis Cardinals

Last MLB appearance
- May 11, 1958, for the St. Louis Cardinals

MLB statistics
- Win–loss record: 7–5
- Earned run average: 3.45
- Strikeouts: 45
- Stats at Baseball Reference

Teams
- St. Louis Cardinals (1957–1958)

Max Von McDaniel (April 18, 1939 – August 20, 1995) was an American professional baseball player. Initially a right-handed pitcher, he was a rookie sensation at age 18 when, just days out of high school, he pitched a complete game, two-hit shutout for the St. Louis Cardinals in his first Major League (MLB) start against the defending National League champion Brooklyn Dodgers on June 21, 1957.

McDaniel went on to have a sparkling debut season in the Majors. Winning his first four decisions, he pitched 19 consecutive scoreless innings, bested his first start by recording a one-hitter, and posted a 7–5 win–loss record and a 3.22 earned run average in 17 games and 86 2/3 innings pitched. But a breakdown in his pitching mechanics resulted in severe control problems that curtailed both his mound and MLB careers and caused him to eventually become a third baseman in minor league baseball.

== Major League debut ==
The younger brother of Lindy McDaniel, Von was born in Hollis, Oklahoma; he threw and batted right-handed, stood 6 feet 2 inches (1.88 m) tall and weighed 180 pounds (82 kg).

Upon his 1957 graduation from Arnett High School, he signed with the St. Louis Cardinals for a $50,000 bonus and was placed on the Redbirds' Major League roster per the bonus rules of the era. Lindy, then 21, was in his third season with the Cardinals; he was an established big leaguer who would win 15 games for St. Louis that season, and go on to pitch for 21 years in Major League Baseball.

Von McDaniel joined the Cardinals and pitched effectively in relief, gaining his first Major League Baseball win against the Dodgers at Ebbets Field with four innings of shutout relief five days prior to his June 21 debut as a starter. In his two-hitter on June 21 at Busch Stadium, he allowed only an infield single to Jim Gilliam and a bunt single to Duke Snider, both of them in the sixth inning. But he worked out of a bases-loaded, no out jam to preserve his shutout. He issued three bases on balls and struck out four.

With the McDaniels winning six games between them, the Cardinals won 18 of 24 games between May 31 and June 23, rising to second place in the National League standings, where they finished at year's end. Von's one-hitter took place on July 28, also at Busch Stadium; he allowed only a second-inning double to Gene Baker, blanking the Pittsburgh Pirates, 4–0, striking out four and issuing no bases on balls.

== Control problems ==
However, when the 1958 season began, McDaniel became inexplicably wild. He appeared in only two games for the Cardinals, and in two innings issued five walks, gave up three hits and three earned runs, and was dispatched to the Class B Carolina League to try to regain his effectiveness. Although McDaniel rebounded somewhat in 1959, in Class D, then the minors' lowest classification, he never conquered his control problems. As events turned out, his final appearance in Major League Baseball occurred on May 11, 1958.

"He lost his coordination and his mechanics", Lindy McDaniel told author Pat Jordan, himself a former professional baseball pitcher, in 2001. "There was no real explanation. Some people thought it was psychological. But who knew about those things then? They sent Von down to the minors, but he couldn't get anyone out. He kept sinking further and further until he couldn't pitch anymore."

== Conversion to third baseman ==
During the 1960 season, with the Canadian Winnipeg Goldeyes of the Class C Northern League, McDaniel became a third baseman to take advantage of his batting prowess and to try to return to the Major Leagues. He slugged 14 home runs and batted in 79 runs in Triple-A with the 1962 Oklahoma City 89ers of the American Association, but failed to make the parent team, the expansion Houston Colt .45s. His professional career ended after the 1966 season.

Von McDaniel died at age 56 in Lawton, Oklahoma, after suffering a heart attack and a stroke.
