= Lloyd Merritt =

American baseball player (born 1933)

- Pitcher
- Born: April 8, 1933 (age 92); St. Louis, Missouri, U.S.
- Batted: Right Threw: Right

MLB debut
- April 22, 1957, for the St. Louis Cardinals

Last MLB appearance
- September 28, 1957, for the St. Louis Cardinals

MLB statistics
- Win–loss record: 1–2
- Earned run average: 3.31
- Strikeouts: 35
- Stats at Baseball Reference

Teams
- St. Louis Cardinals (1957)

Lloyd Wesley Merritt (born April 8, 1933) is an American former professional baseball player. He was a right-handed pitcher for one season (1957) with the St. Louis Cardinals. For his career, he compiled a 1–2 record, with a 3.31 earned run average, and 35 strikeouts in 65⅓ innings pitched.

An alumnus of Washington University in St. Louis, he was born in St. Louis, Missouri and played baseball for the Washington University Bears.
