= Dick Drott =

American baseball player (1936–1985)

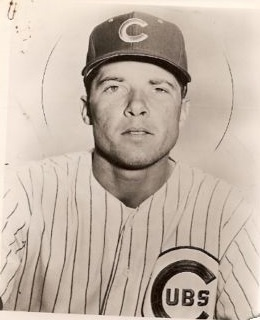
- Drott in 1961
- Pitcher
- Born: July 1, 1936; Cincinnati, Ohio, U.S.
- Died: August 16, 1985 (aged 49); Glendale Heights, Illinois, U.S.
- Batted: Right Threw: Right

MLB debut
- April 16, 1957, for the Chicago Cubs

Last MLB appearance
- September 27, 1963, for the Houston Colt .45s

MLB statistics
- Win–loss record: 27–46
- Earned run average: 4.78
- Strikeouts: 460
- Stats at Baseball Reference

Teams
- Chicago Cubs (1957–1961); Houston Colt .45s (1962–1963)

Richard Fred Drott (July 1, 1936 – August 16, 1985) was an American Major League Baseball player who pitched for the Chicago Cubs and the Houston Colt .45s. Drott, nicknamed "Hummer", started his major league career in 1957 with the Cubs. He won 15 games as a rookie, led the league in walks allowed, and finished third in balloting for Rookie of the Year. He graduated from Western Hills High School in Cincinnati, Ohio.

On April 24, 1957, Drott was ejected from a game for using a wheelchair to wheel Moe Drabowsky to first base after Drabowsky claimed he was hit on the foot by a pitch.

Arm injuries limited Drott's effectiveness after 1957. He was drafted during the regular phase of the 1961 MLB Expansion Draft by the Houston Colt .45s. After posting a 2–12 record in 1963, Drott was sent back to the minor leagues. By 1965 he was finished playing professional baseball. Drott finished his career with a record of 27–46 with a lifetime 4.78 ERA in 176 games played.

Dick Drott died of stomach cancer at age 49.
