= 1958 Philadelphia Phillies season =

Major League Baseball season

1958 Philadelphia Phillies
- League: National League
- Ballpark: Connie Mack Stadium
- City: Philadelphia
- Owners: R. R. M. Carpenter Jr.
- General managers: Roy Hamey
- Managers: Mayo Smith, Eddie Sawyer
- Television: WRCV; WVUE
- Radio: WIP (By Saam, Gene Kelly, Claude Haring)

The 1958 Philadelphia Phillies season was the 76th in franchise history. The Phillies finished the season in last place in the National League. It was the Phillies third losing season in five seasons, and their fourth losing season during the 1950s.

== Offseason ==
- December 11, 1957: Dave Philley was purchased by the Phillies from the Detroit Tigers.

=== Spring training ===
Following their off-season move from Brooklyn to Los Angeles, the Dodgers played their first game as the Los Angeles Dodgers against the Phillies at Miami Stadium in the 1958 spring training opener on March 8, 1958. The Phillies won 7 to 4.

== Regular season ==
With the move of the Brooklyn Dodgers and New York Giants to California prior to the 1958 season, the Phillies became the closest National League club to New York City, and in response, contracted to broadcast 78 games into the New York metropolitan television market to fill the void in National League games on TV in New York. Al Helfer and Rex Barney called the games for New York's WOR-TV. However, due to competition with games at Yankee Stadium, Phillies games were not able to match the audience for Yankee broadcasts, and thus, they stopped broadcasting games in the New York television market in the 1959 season.

On July 22 with the team sporting a 39–44 record General Manager Roy Hamey fired Manager Mayo Smith rehiring Eddie Sawyer, who led the team to the 1950 World Series.

=== Season standings ===
National League
Team	W	L	Pct.	GB	Home	Road
Milwaukee Braves	92	62	.597	—	48‍–‍29	44‍–‍33
Pittsburgh Pirates	84	70	.545	8	49‍–‍28	35‍–‍42
San Francisco Giants	80	74	.519	12	44‍–‍33	36‍–‍41
Cincinnati Redlegs	76	78	.494	16	40‍–‍37	36‍–‍41
Chicago Cubs	72	82	.468	20	35‍–‍42	37‍–‍40
St. Louis Cardinals	72	82	.468	20	39‍–‍38	33‍–‍44
Los Angeles Dodgers	71	83	.461	21	39‍–‍38	32‍–‍45
Philadelphia Phillies	69	85	.448	23	35‍–‍42	34‍–‍43

=== Record vs. opponents ===
1958 National League record Sources:
Team	CHC	CIN	LAD	MIL	PHI	PIT	SF	STL
Chicago	—	10–12	11–11	10–12	13–9	9–13	12–10	7–15
Cincinnati	12–10	—	11–11	5–17	15–7	10–12	11–11	12–10
Los Angeles	11–11	11–11	—	14–8	10–12	8–14	6–16	11–11
Milwaukee	12–10	17–5	8–14	—	13–9	11–11	16–6	15–7
Philadelphia	9–13	7–15	12–10	9–13	—	12–10	8–14	12–10
Pittsburgh	13–9	12–10	14–8	11–11	10–12	—	12–10	12–10
San Francisco	10–12	11–11	16–6	6–16	14–8	10–12	—	13–9
St. Louis	15–7	10–12	11–11	7–15	10–12	10–12	9–13	—

=== Notable transactions ===
- April 15, 1958: Ramón Conde was acquired by the Phillies from the Kansas City Athletics.
- June 8, 1958: Danny Cater was signed as an amateur free agent by the Phillies.
- June 13, 1958: Joe Lonnett was traded by the Phillies to the Milwaukee Braves for Carl Sawatski.
- July 9, 1958: John Boozer was signed as an amateur free agent by the Phillies.
- July 21, 1958: Dwight Siebler was signed as an amateur free agent by the Phillies.
- August 15, 1958: Ramón Conde was purchased from the Phillies by the Los Angeles Dodgers.
- September 29, 1958: Solly Hemus was traded by the Phillies to the St. Louis Cardinals for Gene Freese.

=== Game log ===
Legend
	Phillies win
	Phillies loss
	Postponement
**Bold**	Phillies team member

1958 Game Log
Overall Record: 69–85
April (5–7)

#	Date	Opponent	Score	Win	Loss	Save	Attendance	Record
1	April 15	@ Redlegs	5–4	**Ray Semproch** (1–0)	Bill Wight (0–1)	None	32,849	1–0
2	April 18	Braves	2–4	Bob Buhl (1–0)	**Jack Sanford** (0–1)	Don McMahon (1)	31,624	1–1
3	April 19	Braves	0–5	Warren Spahn (1–0)	**Curt Simmons** (0–1)	None	8,579	1–2
4	April 20	Braves	3–2	**Robin Roberts** (1–0)	Bob Rush (0–1)	None	16,366	2–2
5	April 21	Redlegs	2–4 (14)	Hal Jeffcoat (1–0)	**Jim Hearn** (0–1)	Johnny Klippstein (1)	11,764	2–3
6	April 23	Pirates	8–1	**Jack Sanford** (1–1)	Ron Blackburn (1–1)	None	7,668	3–3
7	April 24	Pirates	4–7	Bob Friend (2–0)	**Curt Simmons** (0–2)	Roy Face (1)	7,456	3–4
8	April 25	@ Braves	0–4	Bob Rush (1–1)	**Robin Roberts** (1–1)	None	15,891	3–5
9	April 26	@ Braves	2–4	Bob Buhl (3–0)	**Ray Semproch** (1–1)	None	15,391	3–6
10	April 27	@ Braves	6–2	**Jack Sanford** (2–1)	Lew Burdette (1–2)	None	18,408	4–6
11	April 29	@ Giants	7–4	**Curt Simmons** (1–2)	Ramón Monzant (2–2)	**Turk Farrell** (1)	6,801	5–6
12	April 30	@ Giants	1–10	Johnny Antonelli (2–1)	**Robin Roberts** (1–2)	None	7,886	5–7

May (13–15)

#	Date	Opponent	Score	Win	Loss	Save	Attendance	Record
13	May 1	@ Giants	7–0	**Ray Semproch** (2–1)	Rubén Gómez (2–1)	None	6,728	6–7
14	May 2	@ Giants	2–4	Mike McCormick (1–0)	**Jack Sanford** (2–2)	Marv Grissom (2)	13,486	6–8
15	May 3	@ Giants	4–2	**Curt Simmons** (2–2)	Ramón Monzant (2–3)	**Turk Farrell** (2)	13,073	7–8
16	May 4 (1)	@ Dodgers	7–8	Don Bessent (1–0)	**Robin Roberts** (1–3)	Ed Roebuck (2)	see 2nd game	7–9
17	May 4 (2)	@ Dodgers	2–15	Danny McDevitt (1–2)	**Warren Hacker** (0–1)	None	38,453	7–10
18	May 5	@ Dodgers	8–3	**Ray Semproch** (3–1)	Don Drysdale (0–5)	None	18,075	8–10
19	May 6	@ Dodgers	6–7 (14)	Don Drysdale (1–5)	**Turk Farrell** (0–1)	None	15,799	8–11
20	May 7	@ Dodgers	9–3	**Curt Simmons** (3–2)	Fred Kipp (1–2)	None	8,192	9–11
21	May 9	@ Pirates	0–1 (12)	Ron Kline (3–2)	**Robin Roberts** (1–4)	None	21,304	9–12
22	May 10	@ Pirates	4–14	Vern Law (4–1)	**Ray Semproch** (3–2)	None	11,807	9–13
23	May 11 (1)	@ Pirates	4–10	Bob Friend (5–1)	**Jack Sanford** (2–3)	None	see 2nd game	9–14
24	May 11 (2)	@ Pirates	0–1 (11)	Bob Porterfield (1–0)	**Curt Simmons** (3–3)	None	20,544	9–15
25	May 13	Braves	5–2	**Robin Roberts** (2–4)	Bob Buhl (4–2)	None	13,906	10–15
26	May 14	Braves	1–4	Warren Spahn (6–0)	**Ray Semproch** (3–3)	None	13,803	10–16
–	May 15	Braves	Postponed (rain); Makeup: August 10 as a traditional double-header					
27	May 16	Pirates	6–2	**Curt Simmons** (4–3)	Bob Porterfield (1–1)	None	12,401	11–16
28	May 17	Pirates	4–3	**Robin Roberts** (3–4)	Bennie Daniels (0–2)	None	6,262	12–16
29	May 18 (1)	Pirates	6–4	**Jack Sanford** (3–3)	Ron Kline (4–3)	**Turk Farrell** (3)	see 2nd game	13–16
30	May 18 (2)	Pirates	6–2	**Ray Semproch** (4–3)	Vern Law (5–2)	None	19,068	14–16
31	May 20	Cardinals	0–5	Lindy McDaniel (3–3)	**Curt Simmons** (4–4)	None	14,669	14–17
32	May 21	Cardinals	1–0	**Robin Roberts** (4–4)	Sam Jones (3–4)	None	16,621	15–17
33	May 22	Cubs	4–7	Moe Drabowsky (2–4)	**Jack Sanford** (3–4)	Don Elston (2)	5,819	15–18
34	May 23	Cubs	4–11	Glen Hobbie (3–4)	**Ray Semproch** (4–4)	None	10,664	15–19
35	May 24	Cubs	5–4	**Turk Farrell** (1–1)	Don Elston (5–1)	None	5,210	16–19
–	May 25	Dodgers	Postponed (rain); Makeup: July 27 as a traditional double-header					
36	May 26	Dodgers	1–2	Carl Erskine (3–2)	**Robin Roberts** (4–5)	None	12,807	16–20
37	May 27	Giants	5–1	**Jack Sanford** (4–4)	Stu Miller (1–1)	None	15,718	17–20
38	May 28	Giants	6–7	Marv Grissom (4–1)	**Turk Farrell** (1–2)	None	10,561	17–21
39	May 30	Redlegs	1–10	Harvey Haddix (3–3)	**Curt Simmons** (4–5)	None	11,129	17–22
40	May 31	Redlegs	5–4	**Robin Roberts** (5–5)	Joe Nuxhall (1–2)	None	6,641	18–22

June (13–14)

#	Date	Opponent	Score	Win	Loss	Save	Attendance	Record
41	June 1 (1)	Redlegs	1–2	Bob Purkey (6–1)	**Jack Sanford** (4–5)	None	see 2nd game	18–23
42	June 1 (2)	Redlegs	11–12 (13)^{^{[a]}}	Joe Nuxhall (2–2)	**Turk Farrell** (1–3)	None	20,028	18–24
43	June 3	@ Cubs	4–12	Taylor Phillips (4–0)	**Curt Simmons** (4–6)	None	5,071	18–25
44	June 4	@ Cubs	5–11	Moe Drabowsky (3–5)	**Robin Roberts** (5–6)	None	5,289	18–26
45	June 5	@ Cubs	7–6	**Ray Semproch** (5–4)	Don Elston (6–3)	**Turk Farrell** (4)	3,046	19–26
46	June 6	@ Cardinals	1–3	Sam Jones (4–6)	**Seth Morehead** (0–1)	None	17,559	19–27
47	June 7	@ Cardinals	15–6	**Curt Simmons** (5–6)	Lindy McDaniel (3–5)	None	10,839	20–27
48	June 8 (1)	@ Cardinals	5–6 (10)	Billy Muffett (3–1)	**Jack Meyer** (0–1)	None	see 2nd game	20–28
49	June 8 (2)	@ Cardinals	6–4 (14)	**Turk Farrell** (2–3)	Lindy McDaniel (3–6)	None	22,022	21–28
50	June 10	@ Dodgers	3–2	**Ray Semproch** (6–4)	Don Newcombe (0–5)	None	19,671	22–28
51	June 11	@ Dodgers	4–7	Don Drysdale (3–8)	**Jim Hearn** (0–2)	None	16,236	22–29
52	June 12	@ Dodgers	4–3	**Turk Farrell** (3–3)	Stan Williams (1–1)	None	9,899	23–29
53	June 13	@ Giants	1–6	Johnny Antonelli (6–4)	**Robin Roberts** (5–7)	None	18,068	23–30
54	June 14	@ Giants	3–2	**Ray Semproch** (7–4)	Ramón Monzant (4–6)	None	16,363	24–30
55	June 15	@ Giants	1–3	Al Worthington (5–2)	**Curt Simmons** (5–7)	None	22,462	24–31
56	June 17	Dodgers	9–6	**Jack Sanford** (5–5)	Clem Labine (3–2)	**Turk Farrell** (5)	16,823	25–31
57	June 18	Dodgers	0–3	Stan Williams (2–1)	**Robin Roberts** (5–8)	None	11,399	25–32
58	June 19	Dodgers	9–3	**Ray Semproch** (8–4)	Johnny Podres (7–5)	None	13,506	26–32
59	June 20	Giants	5–4	**Jim Hearn** (1–2)	Rubén Gómez (5–6)	None	14,877	27–32
–	June 21	Giants	Postponed (rain); Makeup: July 24 as a traditional double-header					
60	June 22 (1)	Giants	4–5 (14)	Johnny Antonelli (7–5)	**Ray Semproch** (8–5)	None	see 2nd game	27–33
61	June 22 (2)	Giants	3–2^{^{[b]}}	**Robin Roberts** (6–8)	Rubén Gómez (5–7)	None	30,454	28–33
62	June 24	Cubs	0–3	John Briggs (1–0)	**Jack Sanford** (5–6)	None	21,656	28–34
63	June 25	Cubs	5–4 (10)	**Turk Farrell** (4–3)	Don Elston (6–5)	None	11,796	29–34
64	June 27	Cardinals	5–4 (11)	**Turk Farrell** (5–3)	Billy Muffett (3–2)	None	24,918	30–34
65	June 28	Cardinals	1–8	Sal Maglie (3–1)	**Curt Simmons** (5–8)	None	11,010	30–35
66	June 29 (1)	Cardinals	5–4 (13)	**Jack Meyer** (1–1)	Larry Jackson (5–4)	None	see 2nd game	31–35
67	June 29 (2)	Cardinals	3–4^{^{[c]}}	Vinegar Bend Mizell (6–6)	**Jack Sanford** (5–7)	Jim Brosnan (1)	27,554	31–36

July (15–14)

#	Date	Opponent	Score	Win	Loss	Save	Attendance	Record
68	July 1	@ Pirates	4–2	**Ray Semproch** (9–5)	Bob Friend (9–9)	None	17,990	32–36
69	July 3	@ Braves	3–1	**Robin Roberts** (7–8)	Carl Willey (2–1)	None	17,624	33–36
70	July 4 (1)	@ Braves	5–1	**Curt Simmons** (6–8)	Bob Rush (6–4)	**Turk Farrell** (6)	see 2nd game	34–36
71	July 4 (2)	@ Braves	4–0	**Jack Sanford** (6–7)	Warren Spahn (10–5)	None	23,706	35–36
72	July 5	@ Redlegs	8–5 (12)	**Turk Farrell** (6–3)	Willard Schmidt (2–3)	None	6,954	36–36
73	July 6 (1)	@ Redlegs	7–1	**Ray Semproch** (10–5)	Brooks Lawrence (6–4)	None	see 2nd game	37–36
74	July 6 (2)	@ Redlegs	4–11	Joe Nuxhall (6–4)	**Seth Morehead** (0–2)	Hal Jeffcoat (8)	14,851	37–37
–	July 8	**1958 Major League Baseball All-Star Game at Memorial Stadium in Baltimore**						
75	July 10	@ Cardinals	13–3	**Robin Roberts** (8–8)	Sal Maglie (3–3)	None	17,619	38–37
76	July 11	@ Cardinals	2–6	Sam Jones (6–7)	**Jack Sanford** (6–8)	None	16,095	38–38
77	July 12	@ Cubs	12–2	**Ray Semproch** (11–5)	Dick Drott (4–7)	None	17,114	39–38
78	July 13 (1)	@ Cubs	2–3	John Briggs (3–0)	**Jack Meyer** (1–2)	None	see 2nd game	39–39
79	July 13 (2)	@ Cubs	1–2	Dave Hillman (2–0)	**Curt Simmons** (6–9)	None	30,415	39–40
80	July 14	@ Cubs	10–11 (11)	Glen Hobbie (7–6)	**Ray Semproch** (11–6)	None	5,610	39–41
81	July 15	@ Giants	0–1	Mike McCormick (7–1)	**Robin Roberts** (8–9)	None	14,523	39–42
82	July 16	@ Giants	2–9	Johnny Antonelli (10–7)	**Jack Sanford** (6–9)	None	10,250	39–43
83	July 17	@ Giants	7–8	Marv Grissom (6–3)	**Turk Farrell** (6–4)	None	10,259	39–44
84	July 18	@ Dodgers	6–8	Carl Erskine (4–3)	**Jack Sanford** (6–10)	Clem Labine (9)	24,533	39–45
85	July 19	@ Dodgers	6–2	**Robin Roberts** (9–9)	Sandy Koufax (7–4)	None	30,962	40–45
86	July 20	@ Dodgers	0–6	Johnny Podres (10–8)	**Curt Simmons** (6–10)	None	17,506	40–46
–	July 22	Giants	Postponed (rain, wet grounds); Makeup: September 12 as a traditional double-header					
87	July 23	Giants	2–0	**Ray Semproch** (12–6)	Mike McCormick (7–2)	None	23,050	41–46
–	July 24 (1)	Giants	Postponed (rain); Makeup: July 28 as a traditional double-header					
–	July 24 (2)	Giants	Postponed (rain); Makeup: July 28 as a traditional double-header					
88	July 25	Dodgers	3–7	Clem Labine (4–3)	**Jim Hearn** (1–3)	Fred Kipp (1)	19,171	41–47
89	July 26	Dodgers	4–10	Sandy Koufax (8–4)	**Jack Sanford** (6–11)	None	18,117	41–48
90	July 27 (1)	Dodgers	7–4	**Robin Roberts** (10–9)	Stan Williams (6–6)	None	see 2nd game	42–48
91	July 27 (2)	Dodgers	6–2 (10)^{^{[d]}}	**Jim Hearn** (2–3)	Fred Kipp (4–5)	None	17,666	43–48
92	July 28 (1)	Giants	2–3	Mike McCormick (8–2)	**Turk Farrell** (6–5)	None	see 2nd game	43–49
93	July 28 (2)	Giants	1–2	Rubén Gómez (6–7)	**Jack Meyer** (1–3)	None	29,805	43–50
94	July 29	Cardinals	3–2 (11)	**Bob Miller** (1–0)	Phil Paine (4–1)	None	20,894	44–50
95	July 30	Cardinals	5–1	**Jack Sanford** (7–11)	Billy Muffett (3–3)	**Turk Farrell** (7)	14,706	45–50
96	July 31	Cardinals	4–3	**Jim Hearn** (3–3)	Larry Jackson (7–9)	**Turk Farrell** (8)	16,695	46–50

August (12–19)

#	Date	Opponent	Score	Win	Loss	Save	Attendance	Record
97	August 1	Cubs	3–1	**Robin Roberts** (11–9)	Dave Hillman (2–3)	None	16,258	47–50
98	August 2	Cubs	5–6	Bill Henry (4–1)	**Bob Miller** (1–1)	Don Elston (6)	8,821	47–51
99	August 3 (1)	Cubs	8–2	**Ray Semproch** (13–6)	Taylor Phillips (6–6)	None	see 2nd game	48–51
100	August 3 (2)	Cubs	10–12	Marcelino Solis (2–1)	**Jack Meyer** (1–4)	Bill Henry (5)	16,211	48–52
101	August 5	@ Redlegs	5–6	Joe Nuxhall (9–7)	**Turk Farrell** (6–6)	None	9,107	48–53
102	August 6	@ Redlegs	8–5	**Robin Roberts** (12–9)	Harvey Haddix (7–6)	**Turk Farrell** (9)	8,646	49–53
103	August 7	@ Redlegs	3–2	**Don Cardwell** (1–0)	Bob Purkey (13–7)	None	7,341	50–53
104	August 8	Braves	7–6	**Turk Farrell** (7–6)	Don McMahon (6–2)	None	25,842	51–53
105	August 9	Braves	5–4	**Jim Hearn** (4–3)	Lew Burdette (11–9)	None	24,943	52–53
106	August 10 (1)	Braves	7–8	Humberto Robinson (2–3)	**Jack Meyer** (1–5)	None	see 2nd game	52–54
107	August 10 (2)	Braves	3–14	Carl Willey (7–3)	**Robin Roberts** (12–10)	Juan Pizarro (1)	32,117	52–55
108	August 11	Redlegs	5–4 (10)	**Don Cardwell** (2–0)	Willard Schmidt (2–5)	None	14,247	53–55
109	August 12	Redlegs	4–12	Tom Acker (1–2)	**Ray Semproch** (13–7)	None	12,926	53–56
110	August 13	Pirates	9–10	Bob Smith (1–2)	**Jack Meyer** (1–6)	Vern Law (2)	19,132	53–57
111	August 15	@ Braves	0–1	Carl Willey (8–3)	**Robin Roberts** (12–11)	None	35,552	53–58
112	August 16	@ Braves	1–2	Warren Spahn (16–8)	**Curt Simmons** (6–11)	None	31,869	53–59
113	August 17 (1)	@ Braves	1–5	Juan Pizarro (4–1)	**Don Cardwell** (2–1)	None	see 2nd game	53–60
114	August 17 (2)	@ Braves	1–4	Lew Burdette (13–9)	**Ray Semproch** (13–8)	None	39,807	53–61
115	August 19	@ Cardinals	4–5	Bill Wight (3–1)	**Turk Farrell** (7–7)	None	17,851	53–62
116	August 20	@ Cardinals	12–2	**Robin Roberts** (13–11)	Billy Muffett (4–5)	None	11,928	54–62
117	August 21	@ Cardinals	1–2	Larry Jackson (10–10)	**Curt Simmons** (6–12)	None	10,314	54–63
118	August 22	@ Cardinals	1–9	Sam Jones (11–9)	**Don Cardwell** (2–2)	None	15,592	54–64
119	August 23	@ Cardinals	4–2	**Seth Morehead** (1–2)	Sal Maglie (3–7)	**Turk Farrell** (10)	14,639	55–64
120	August 24 (1)	@ Cubs	13–8	**Jim Hearn** (5–3)	Bill Henry (4–3)	**Jack Meyer** (1)	see 2nd game	56–64
121	August 24 (2)	@ Cubs	5–3 (8)	**Jack Sanford** (8–11)	Dave Hillman (3–6)	**Curt Simmons** (1)	24,572	57–64
122	August 26	@ Cubs	10–3	**Robin Roberts** (14–11)	Moe Drabowsky (9–11)	None	9,967	58–64
123	August 27	@ Cubs	2–5	Bob Anderson (1–0)	**Curt Simmons** (6–13)	None	9,451	58–65
124	August 29	@ Redlegs	3–5	Bob Purkey (15–8)	**Don Cardwell** (2–3)	None	10,283	58–66
125	August 30	@ Redlegs	3–12	Tom Acker (3–2)	**Seth Morehead** (1–3)	Brooks Lawrence (3)	5,083	58–67
126	August 31 (1)	@ Redlegs	2–6	Harvey Haddix (8–7)	**Ray Semproch** (13–9)	None	see 2nd game	58–68
127	August 31 (2)	@ Redlegs	3–7	Don Newcombe (5–11)	**Robin Roberts** (14–12)	None	13,290	58–69

September (11–16)

#	Date	Opponent	Score	Win	Loss	Save	Attendance	Record
128	September 1 (1)	@ Pirates	2–5	Vern Law (11–11)	**Jack Sanford** (8–12)	None	see 2nd game	58–70
129	September 1 (2)	@ Pirates	9–0	**Curt Simmons** (7–13)	Bob Porterfield (3–6)	None	25,438	59–70
130	September 2	@ Pirates	2–3	Bob Friend (19–13)	**Don Cardwell** (2–4)	None	9,911	59–71
131	September 3	Braves	5–11	Warren Spahn (18–10)	**Seth Morehead** (1–4)	None	14,829	59–72
132	September 4	Braves	5–9 (10)	Juan Pizarro (5–2)	**Turk Farrell** (7–8)	None	14,989	59–73
133	September 5	Redlegs	4–8	Don Newcombe (6–11)	**Robin Roberts** (14–13)	Brooks Lawrence (4)	10,530	59–74
134	September 6	Redlegs	2–10	Bob Purkey (16–9)	**Curt Simmons** (7–14)	None	5,559	59–75
135	September 7 (1)	Redlegs	4–6	Hal Jeffcoat (6–8)	**Turk Farrell** (7–9)	None	see 2nd game	59–76
136	September 7 (2)	Redlegs	2–9	Joe Nuxhall (12–10)	**Seth Morehead** (1–5)	Orlando Peña (2)	12,081	59–77
137	September 9	Dodgers	4–3	**Jack Sanford** (9–12)	Sandy Koufax (10–10)	**Jack Meyer** (2)	8,359	60–77
138	September 10	Dodgers	8–6	**Robin Roberts** (15–13)	Don Drysdale (11–13)	**Don Erickson** (1)	5,106	61–77
139	September 11	Dodgers	4–3	**Turk Farrell** (8–9)	Johnny Podres (13–13)	None	4,382	62–77
140	September 12 (1)	Giants	2–5	Rubén Gómez (9–12)	**Don Cardwell** (2–5)	Al Worthington (4)	see 2nd game	62–78
141	September 12 (2)	Giants	2–19	Johnny Antonelli (15–12)	**Ray Semproch** (13–10)	None	16,560	62–79
142	September 13	Giants	5–6	Gordon Jones (3–1)	**Seth Morehead** (1–6)	Don Johnson (1)	6,502	62–80
143	September 14	Cardinals	3–6	Sam Jones (13–11)	**Jack Sanford** (9–13)	Jim Brosnan (4)	7,802	62–81
144	September 15	Cardinals	6–2	**Robin Roberts** (16–13)	Vinegar Bend Mizell (10–13)	None	5,988	63–81
145	September 16	Cubs	8–10 (10)	John Buzhardt (1–0)	**Don Erickson** (0–1)	Dave Hillman (1)	4,300	63–82
146	September 17	Cubs	2–6 (7)	Bob Anderson (3–1)	**Ray Semproch** (13–11)	None	2,845	63–83
147	September 19	Pirates	2–4	Bob Friend (22–13)	**Don Cardwell** (2–6)	None	8,498	63–84
148	September 20	Pirates	3–4	Vern Law (14–11)	**Robin Roberts** (16–14)	Bob Smith (2)	4,217	63–85
–	September 21 (1)	Pirates	Postponed (rain); Makeup: September 22 as a traditional double-header					
–	September 21 (2)	Pirates	Postponed (rain); Makeup: September 22 as a traditional double-header					
149	September 22 (1)	Pirates	3–2 (14)	**Jack Meyer** (2–6)	Ron Kline (13–16)	None	see 2nd game	64–85
150	September 22 (2)	Pirates	1–0	**Jack Sanford** (10–13)	Bennie Daniels (0–3)	None	5,605	65–85
151	September 23	@ Braves	6–5	**Jim Owens** (1–0)	Juan Pizarro (6–4)	**Turk Farrell** (11)	18,639	66–85
152	September 26	@ Pirates	3–2	**Robin Roberts** (17–14)	Bob Friend (22–14)	None	12,000	67–85
153	September 27	@ Pirates	7–3	**Don Cardwell** (3–6)	Vern Law (14–12)	None	9,104	68–85
154	September 28	@ Pirates	6–4 (10)	**Jack Meyer** (3–6)	Don Gross (5–7)	None	33,109	69–85

^{^[a]}The second game on June 1 was suspended (Sunday curfew) in the top of the ninth inning with the score 11–11 and was completed August 11, 1958.
^{^[b]}The second game on June 22 was suspended (Sunday curfew) in the bottom of the sixth inning with the score 0–1 and was completed July 23, 1958. (The initial completion date of July 22 was postponed by rain.)
^{^[c]}The second game on June 29 was suspended (Sunday curfew) in the bottom of the eighth inning with the score 3–4 and was completed July 29, 1958.
^{^[d]}The second game on July 27 was suspended (Sunday curfew) in the bottom of the sixth inning with the score 2–1 and was completed September 9, 1958.

=== Roster ===
1958 Philadelphia Phillies
**Roster**
**Pitchers**: 3 John Anderson; 46 Don Cardwell; 41 Bob Conley; 25 Don Erickson; 43 Turk Farrell; 38 Johnny Gray; 49 Warren Hacker; 22 Jim Hearn; 50 Angelo LiPetri; 19 Hank Mason; 42 Jack Meyer; 19 Bob Miller; 44 Seth Morehead; 49 Jim Owens; 33 Tom Qualters; 36 Robin Roberts; 39 Jack Sanford; 48 Ray Semproch; 28 Curt Simmons	**Catchers**: 27 Jimmie Coker; 38 Jim Hegan; 8 Joe Lonnett; 29 Stan Lopata; 58 Carl Sawatski; **Infielders**: 5 Ed Bouchee; 16,17 Chico Fernández; 2 Granny Hamner; 4 Solly Hemus; 18 Pancho Herrera; 6 Willie Jones; 7 Ted Kazanski; 17 Roy Smalley Jr.; 37 Bobby Young	**Outfielders**: 9 Harry Anderson; 1 Richie Ashburn; 10 Bob Bowman; 37 Chuck Essegian; 12 Dave Philley; 14 Wally Post; 15 Rip Repulski; **Other batters**: 34 Mack Burk	**Manager**: 24 Mayo Smith; 24 Eddie Sawyer; **Coaches**: 11 Benny Bengough; 32 Wally Moses; 31 Bill Posedel; 21 Andy Seminick

== Player stats ==
= Indicates team leader

= Indicates league leader

=== Batting ===
==== Starters by position ====
Note: Pos = Position; G = Games played; AB = At bats; H = Hits; Avg. = Batting average; HR = Home runs; RBI = Runs batted in

Pos	Player	G	AB	H	Avg.	HR	RBI
C	Stan Lopata	86	258	64	.248	9	33
1B	Ed Bouchee	89	334	86	.257	9	39
2B	Solly Hemus	105	334	95	.284	8	36
SS	Chico Fernández	146	522	120	.230	6	51
3B	Willie Jones	118	398	108	.271	14	60
LF	Harry Anderson	140	515	155	.301	23	97
CF	Richie Ashburn	152	615	215	.350	2	33
RF	Wally Post	110	379	107	.282	12	62

==== Other batters ====
Note: G = Games played; AB = At bats; H = Hits; Avg. = Batting average; HR = Home runs; RBI = Runs batted in

Player	G	AB	H	Avg.	HR	RBI
Ted Kazanski	95	289	66	.228	3	35
Rip Repulski	85	238	58	.244	13	40
Dave Philley	91	207	64	.309	3	31
Bob Bowman	91	184	53	.288	8	24
Carl Sawatski	60	183	42	.230	5	12
Granny Hamner	35	133	40	.301	2	18
Chuck Essegian	39	114	28	.246	5	16
Pancho Herrera	29	63	17	.270	1	6
Bobby Young	32	60	14	.233	1	4
Jim Hegan	25	59	13	.220	0	6
Joe Lonnett	17	50	7	.140	0	2
Jimmie Coker	2	6	1	.167	0	0
Roy Smalley Jr.	1	2	0	.000	0	0
Mack Burk	1	1	0	.000	0	0

=== Pitching ===
==== Starting pitchers ====
Note: G = Games pitched; IP = Innings pitched; W = Wins; L = Losses; ERA = Earned run average; SO = Strikeouts

Player	G	IP	W	L	ERA	SO
Robin Roberts	35	269.2	17	14	3.24	130
Ray Semproch	36	204.1	13	11	3.92	92
Jack Sanford	38	186.1	10	13	4.44	106
Curt Simmons	29	168.1	7	14	4.38	78
Don Cardwell	16	107.2	3	6	4.51	77
Bob Conley	2	8.1	0	0	7.56	0
Jim Owens	1	7.0	1	0	2.57	3

==== Other pitchers ====
Note: G = Games pitched; IP = Innings pitched; W = Wins; L = Losses; ERA = Earned run average; SO = Strikeouts

Player	G	IP	W	L	ERA	SO
Seth Morehead	27	92.1	1	6	5.85	54
Jack Meyer	37	90.1	3	6	7.88	9
Warren Hacker	9	17.0	0	1	7.41	4
John Anderson	5	16.0	0	0	7.88	9

==== Relief pitchers ====
Note: G = Games pitched; W = Wins; L = Losses; SV = Saves; ERA = Earned run average; SO = Strikeouts

Player	G	W	L	SV	ERA	SO
Turk Farrell	54	8	9	11	3.35	73
Jim Hearn	39	5	3	0	4.17	33
Bob Miller	17	1	1	0	11.69	9
Johnny Gray	15	0	0	0	4.15	10
Don Erickson	9	0	1	1	4.63	9
Angelo LiPetri	4	0	0	0	11.25	1
Hank Mason	1	0	0	0	10.80	3
Tom Qualters	1	0	0	0	4.50	0

== Awards and honors ==
All-Star Game

- Richie Ashburn, starter, outfield
- Turk Farrell, reserve

== Farm system ==
Level	Team	League	Manager
AAA	Miami Marlins	International League	Kerby Farrell
AA	Tulsa Oilers	Texas League	Al Widmar and Jim Fanning
A	Williamsport Grays	Eastern League	Dick Carter
B	High Point-Thomasville Hi-Toms	Carolina League	Frank Lucchesi
C	Bakersfield Bears	California League	Paul Owens
D	Johnson City Phillies	Appalachian League	Eddie Lyons
D	Tampa Tarpons	Florida State League	Charlie Gassaway
D	Brunswick Phillies	Georgia–Florida League	Cart Howerton
D	Olean Oilers	New York–Penn League	Benny Zientara

LEAGUE CHAMPIONS: Johnson City
