= 1958 Chicago Cubs season =

1958 Chicago Cubs
- League: National League
- Ballpark: Wrigley Field
- City: Chicago
- Record: 72–82 (.468)
- League place: 5th
- Owners: Philip K. Wrigley
- General managers: John Holland
- Managers: Bob Scheffing
- Television: WGN-TV (Jack Brickhouse, Vince Lloyd)
- Radio: WGN (Jack Quinlan, Lou Boudreau)

The 1958 Chicago Cubs season was the 87th season of the Chicago Cubs franchise, the 83rd in the National League and the 43rd at Wrigley Field. The Cubs finished fifth in the National League with a record of 72–82.

== Offseason ==
- October 8, 1957: Steve Bilko was purchased from the Cubs by the Cincinnati Redlegs.
- November 16, 1957: Casey Wise was traded by the Cubs to the Milwaukee Braves for Chick King, Ben Johnson, Leonard Williams (minors) and cash.
- December 2, 1957: Tony Taylor was drafted by the Cubs from the San Francisco Giants in the 1957 rule 5 draft.
- December 10, 1957: Tom Poholsky was traded by the Cubs to the San Francisco Giants for Freddy Rodríguez.

== Regular season ==
=== Season standings ===
National League
Team	W	L	Pct.	GB	Home	Road
Milwaukee Braves	92	62	.597	—	48‍–‍29	44‍–‍33
Pittsburgh Pirates	84	70	.545	8	49‍–‍28	35‍–‍42
San Francisco Giants	80	74	.519	12	44‍–‍33	36‍–‍41
Cincinnati Redlegs	76	78	.494	16	40‍–‍37	36‍–‍41
Chicago Cubs	72	82	.468	20	35‍–‍42	37‍–‍40
St. Louis Cardinals	72	82	.468	20	39‍–‍38	33‍–‍44
Los Angeles Dodgers	71	83	.461	21	39‍–‍38	32‍–‍45
Philadelphia Phillies	69	85	.448	23	35‍–‍42	34‍–‍43

=== Record vs. opponents ===
1958 National League record Sources:
Team	CHC	CIN	LAD	MIL	PHI	PIT	SF	STL
Chicago	—	10–12	11–11	10–12	13–9	9–13	12–10	7–15
Cincinnati	12–10	—	11–11	5–17	15–7	10–12	11–11	12–10
Los Angeles	11–11	11–11	—	14–8	10–12	8–14	6–16	11–11
Milwaukee	12–10	17–5	8–14	—	13–9	11–11	16–6	15–7
Philadelphia	9–13	7–15	12–10	9–13	—	12–10	8–14	12–10
Pittsburgh	13–9	12–10	14–8	11–11	10–12	—	12–10	12–10
San Francisco	10–12	11–11	16–6	6–16	14–8	10–12	—	13–9
St. Louis	15–7	10–12	11–11	7–15	10–12	10–12	9–13	—

=== Notable transactions ===
- April 3, 1958: Bob Speake and cash were traded by the Cubs to the San Francisco Giants for Bobby Thomson.
- May 20, 1958: Jim Brosnan was traded by the Cubs to the St. Louis Cardinals for Alvin Dark.

=== Roster ===
1958 Chicago Cubs
Roster
Pitchers: 32 Bob Anderson; 30 John Briggs; 23 Jim Brosnan; 26 Moe Drabowsky; 18 Dick Drott; 31 Dick Ellsworth; 36 Don Elston; 24 Gene Fodge; 32 Hersh Freeman; 19 Bill Henry; 21 Dave Hillman; 28 Glen Hobbie; 31 Turk Lown; 20 Ed Mayer; 27 Dolan Nichols; 29 Taylor Phillips; 22 Freddy Rodríguez; 42 Elmer Singleton; 20 Marcelino Solis	Catchers: 11 Cal Neeman; 10 El Tappe; 15 Sammy Taylor; 19,23 Moe Thacker; Infielders: 16 Bobby Adams; 14 Ernie Banks; 17 Alvin Dark; 4 Johnny Goryl; 23 Jerry Kindall; 8 Dale Long; 27 Jim Marshall; 19 Paul Smith; 5 Tony Taylor	Outfielders: 3 Jim Bolger; 22 Lou Jackson; 20 Chick King; 7 Walt Moryn; 6 Chuck Tanner; 9 Bobby Thomson; 2 Lee Walls; 16 Bob Will; Other batters: 17 Frank Ernaga; 24 Gabe Gabler; 12 Footer Johnson; 22 Gordon Massa; 12 Bobby Morgan	Manager: 25 Bob Scheffing; Coaches: 33 Fred Fitzsimmons; 35 Rogers Hornsby; 34 George Myatt

== Player stats ==
=== Batting ===
==== Starters by position ====
Note: Pos = Position; G = Games played; AB = At bats; H = Hits; Avg. = Batting average; HR = Home runs; RBI = Runs batted in

Pos	Player	G	AB	H	Avg.	HR	RBI
C	Sammy Taylor	96	301	78	.259	6	36
1B	Dale Long	142	480	130	.271	20	75
2B	Tony Taylor	140	497	117	.235	6	27
SS	Ernie Banks	154	617	193	.313	47	129
3B	Alvin Dark	114	464	137	.295	3	43
LF	Walt Moryn	143	512	135	.264	26	77
CF	Bobby Thomson	152	547	155	.283	21	82
RF	Lee Walls	136	513	156	.304	24	72

==== Other batters ====
Note: G = Games played; AB = At bats; H = Hits; Avg. = Batting average; HR = Home runs; RBI = Runs batted in

Player	G	AB	H	Avg.	HR	RBI
Johnny Goryl	83	219	53	.242	4	14
Cal Neeman	76	201	52	.259	12	29
Jim Bolger	84	120	27	.225	1	11
Chuck Tanner	73	103	27	.262	4	17
Bobby Adams	62	96	27	.281	0	4
Jim Marshall	26	81	22	.272	5	11
Lou Jackson	24	35	6	.171	1	6
El Tappe	17	28	6	.214	0	4
Moe Thacker	11	24	6	.250	2	3
Paul Smith	18	20	3	.150	0	1
Frank Ernaga	9	8	1	.125	0	0
Chick King	8	8	2	.250	0	1
Jerry Kindall	3	6	1	.167	0	0
Footer Johnson	8	5	0	.000	0	0
Bob Will	6	4	1	.250	0	0
Gabe Gabler	3	3	0	.000	0	0
Gordon Massa	2	2	0	.000	0	0
Bobby Morgan	1	1	0	.000	0	0

=== Pitching ===
==== Starting pitchers ====
Note: G = Games pitched; IP = Innings pitched; W = Wins; L = Losses; ERA = Earned run average; SO = Strikeouts

Player	G	IP	W	L	ERA	SO
Dick Drott	39	167.1	7	11	5.43	127
Moe Drabowski	22	125.2	9	11	4.51	77
John Briggs	20	95.2	5	5	4.52	46
Jim Brosnan	8	51.2	3	4	3.14	24
Dick Ellsworth	1	2.1	0	1	15.43	0

==== Other pitchers ====
Note: G = Games pitched; IP = Innings pitched; W = Wins; L = Losses; ERA = Earned run average; SO = Strikeouts

Player	G	IP	W	L	ERA	SO
Taylor Phillips	39	170.1	7	10	4.76	102
Glen Hobbie	55	168.1	10	6	3.74	91
Dave Hillman	31	125.2	4	8	3.15	65
Bob Anderson	17	65.2	3	3	3.97	51
Marcelino Solis	15	52.0	3	3	6.06	15
Gene Fodge	16	39.2	1	1	4.76	15
John Buzhardt	6	24.1	3	0	1.85	9

==== Relief pitchers ====
Note: G = Games pitched; W = Wins; L = Losses; SV = Saves; ERA = Earned run average; SO = Strikeouts

Player	G	W	L	SV	ERA	SO
Don Elston	69	9	8	11	2.88	84
Bill Henry	44	5	4	6	2.88	58
Dolan Nichols	24	0	4	1	5.01	9
Ed Mayer	19	2	2	1	3.80	14
Hersh Freeman	9	0	1	0	8.31	7
Freddy Rodríguez	7	0	0	2	7.36	5
Turk Lown	4	0	0	0	4.50	4
Elmer Singleton	2	1	0	0	0.00	2

== Farm system ==
Level	Team	League	Manager
AAA	Portland Beavers	Pacific Coast League	Tommy Heath and Larry Jansen
AA	Fort Worth Cats	Texas League	Lou Klein
A	Pueblo Bruins	Western League	Ray Mueller
B	Burlington Bees	Illinois–Indiana–Iowa League	Walt Dixon
C	Magic Valley Cowboys	Pioneer League	Dick Wilson
D	Pulaski Cubs	Appalachian League	Hersh Martin
D	Paris Lakers	Midwest League	Verlon Walker
D	Carlsbad Potashers	Sophomore League	Tony York
