= 1958 San Francisco Giants season =

1958 San Francisco Giants
- League: National League
- Ballpark: Seals Stadium
- City: San Francisco, California
- Record: 80–74 (.519)
- League place: 3rd
- Owners: Horace Stoneham
- General managers: Chub Feeney
- Managers: Bill Rigney
- Television: KTVU (Russ Hodges, Lon Simmons)
- Radio: KSFO (Russ Hodges, Lon Simmons, Bill King)

The 1958 San Francisco Giants season was the franchise's first season in San Francisco, California, and 76th season overall. The Giants' home ballpark was Seals Stadium. The team had a record of 80–74 finishing in third place in the National League standings, twelve games behind the NL Champion Milwaukee Braves.

Of the broadcast team, Russ Hodges left his former broadcasting partners in New York and for that season was joined on both KTVU and KSFO by Lon Simmons.

== Offseason ==
- December 2, 1957: Tony Taylor was drafted from the Giants by the Chicago Cubs in the 1957 rule 5 draft.
- December 2, 1957: 1957 minor league draft
  - Lee Tate was drafted from the Giants by the St. Louis Cardinals.
  - Ramón Conde was drafted from the Giants by the Kansas City Athletics.
- December 10, 1957: Freddy Rodríguez was traded by the Giants to the Chicago Cubs for Tom Poholsky.
- March 24, 1958: Foster Castleman was purchased from the Giants by the Baltimore Orioles for $30,000.
- Prior to 1958 season:
  - Dick LeMay was signed as an amateur free agent by the Giants.
  - Eddie Fisher was signed by the San Francisco Giants as an amateur free agent.

== Regular season ==
=== Opening day ===
The Giants and the now-Los Angeles Dodgers, arch-rivals for 68 years in New York, faced each other in their respective first-ever game on the West Coast. On Tuesday afternoon, April 15, 1958, at Seals Stadium, the Giants' temporary home park, San Francisco blanked Los Angeles, 8–0, behind Rubén Gómez' complete game, six-hit shutout. Gómez fanned six, issued no bases on balls, and went two for four at the plate. Daryl Spencer hit the first home run in San Francisco's MLB history with a solo shot in the fourth inning, and rookie Orlando Cepeda followed with another solo blast one inning later. Willie Mays had two runs batted in. Don Drysdale took the loss for the Dodgers. Attendance at the longtime minor league stadium was a sellout, 23,448.

==== Starting lineup ====
12	Jim Davenport	3B
22	Jim King	LF
24	Willie Mays	CF
29	Willie Kirkland	RF
30	Orlando Cepeda	1B
20	Daryl Spencer	SS
19	Danny O'Connell	2B
7	Valmy Thomas	C
28	Rubén Gómez	P

=== Season standings ===
National League
Team	W	L	Pct.	GB	Home	Road
Milwaukee Braves	92	62	.597	—	48‍–‍29	44‍–‍33
Pittsburgh Pirates	84	70	.545	8	49‍–‍28	35‍–‍42
San Francisco Giants	80	74	.519	12	44‍–‍33	36‍–‍41
Cincinnati Redlegs	76	78	.494	16	40‍–‍37	36‍–‍41
Chicago Cubs	72	82	.468	20	35‍–‍42	37‍–‍40
St. Louis Cardinals	72	82	.468	20	39‍–‍38	33‍–‍44
Los Angeles Dodgers	71	83	.461	21	39‍–‍38	32‍–‍45
Philadelphia Phillies	69	85	.448	23	35‍–‍42	34‍–‍43

=== Record vs. opponents ===
1958 National League record Sources:
Team	CHC	CIN	LAD	MIL	PHI	PIT	SF	STL
Chicago	—	10–12	11–11	10–12	13–9	9–13	12–10	7–15
Cincinnati	12–10	—	11–11	5–17	15–7	10–12	11–11	12–10
Los Angeles	11–11	11–11	—	14–8	10–12	8–14	6–16	11–11
Milwaukee	12–10	17–5	8–14	—	13–9	11–11	16–6	15–7
Philadelphia	9–13	7–15	12–10	9–13	—	12–10	8–14	12–10
Pittsburgh	13–9	12–10	14–8	11–11	10–12	—	12–10	12–10
San Francisco	10–12	11–11	16–6	6–16	14–8	10–12	—	13–9
St. Louis	15–7	10–12	11–11	7–15	10–12	10–12	9–13	—

=== Notable transactions ===
- April 2, 1958: Ray Katt was traded by the Giants to the St. Louis Cardinals for Jim King.
- April 3, 1958: Bobby Thomson was traded by the Giants to the Chicago Cubs for Bob Speake and cash.
- May 17, 1958: Nick Testa was released by the Giants.
- June 3, 1958: Gaylord Perry was signed as an amateur free agent by the Giants.
- July 15, 1958: Jim King was acquired from the Giants by the Toronto Maple Leafs.
- August 25, 1958: Jesús Alou was signed as an amateur free agent by the Giants.

=== Roster ===
1958 San Francisco Giants
Roster
Pitchers: 43 Johnny Antonelli; 39 Curt Barclay; 35 Pete Burnside; 48 Jim Constable; 44 Ray Crone; 35 John Fitzgerald; 31 Paul Giel; 28 Rubén Gómez; 42 Marv Grissom; 44 Don Johnson; 38 Gordon Jones; 40 Mike McCormick; 37 Stu Miller; 41 Ramón Monzant; 38 Joe Shipley; 32 Al Worthington; 48 Dom Zanni	Catchers: 27 Bob Schmidt; 45,47 Nick Testa; 7 Valmy Thomas; Infielders: 16 Ed Bressoud; 30 Orlando Cepeda; 12 Jim Davenport; 17 Jim Finigan; 10 Ray Jablonski; 19,22 Danny O'Connell; 15 Andre Rodgers; 20 Daryl Spencer; 17 Bill White	Outfielders: 49 Felipe Alou; 22 Jackie Brandt; 22 Jim King; 29 Willie Kirkland; 25 Whitey Lockman; 24 Willie Mays; 6 Hank Sauer; 23 Bob Speake; 14 Don Taussig; 39 Leon Wagner	Manager: 18 Bill Rigney; Coaches: 3 Herman Franks; Lefty O'Doul; 2 Salty Parker; 45 Nick Testa; 9 Wes Westrum

== Player stats ==
= Indicates team leader

= Indicates league leader

=== Batting ===
==== Starters by position ====
Note: Pos = Position; G = Games played; AB = At bats; H = Hits; Avg. = Batting average; HR = Home runs; RBI = Runs batted in; SB = Stolen bases

Pos.	Player	G	AB	H	Avg.	HR	RBI	SB
C	Bob Schmidt	127	393	96	.244	14	54	0
1B	Orlando Cepeda	148	603	188	.312	25	96	15
2B	Danny O'Connell	107	306	71	.232	3	23	2
SS	Daryl Spencer	148	539	138	.256	17	74	1
3B	Jim Davenport	134	434	111	.256	12	41	1
LF	Hank Sauer	88	236	59	.250	12	46	0
CF	Willie Mays	152	600	208	.347	29	96	31
RF	Willie Kirkland	122	418	108	.258	14	56	3

==== Other batters ====
Note: G = Games played; AB = At bats; H = Hits; Avg. = Batting average; HR = Home runs; RBI = Runs batted in

Player	G	AB	H	Avg.	HR	RBI
Ray Jablonski	86	230	53	.230	12	46
Leon Wagner	74	221	70	.317	13	35
Felipe Alou	75	182	46	.253	4	16
Valmy Thomas	63	143	37	.259	3	16
Ed Bressoud	66	137	36	.263	0	8
Whitey Lockman	92	122	29	.238	2	7
Bob Speake	66	71	15	.211	3	10
Andre Rodgers	22	63	13	.206	2	11
Jim King	34	56	12	.214	2	8
Jackie Brandt	18	52	13	.250	0	3
Don Taussig	39	50	10	.200	1	4
Bill White	26	29	7	.241	1	4
Jim Finigan	23	25	5	.200	0	1
Nick Testa	1	0	0	----	0	0

=== Pitching ===
==== Starting pitchers ====
Note: G = Games pitched; IP = Innings pitched; W = Wins; L = Losses; ERA = Earned run average; SO = Strikeouts

Player	G	IP	W	L	ERA	SO
Johnny Antonelli	41	241.2	16	13	3.28	143
Rubén Gómez	42	207.2	10	12	4.38	112
Mike McCormick	42	178.1	11	8	4.59	82
John Fitzgerald	1	3.0	0	0	3.00	3

==== Other pitchers ====
Note: G = Games pitched; IP = Innings pitched; W = Wins; L = Losses; ERA = Earned run average; SO = Strikeouts

Player	G	IP	W	L	ERA	SO
Stu Miller	41	182.0	6	9	2.47	119
Al Worthington	54	151.1	11	7	3.63	76
Ramón Monzant	43	150.2	8	11	4.72	93
Paul Giel	29	92.0	4	5	4.70	55
Curt Barclay	6	16.0	0	1	2.81	6
Pete Burnside	6	10.2	0	0	6.75	4

==== Relief pitchers ====
Note: G = Games pitched; W = Wins; L = Losses; SV = Saves; ERA = Earned run average; SO = Strikeouts

Player	G	W	L	SV	ERA	SO
Marv Grissom	51	7	5	11	3.99	46
Don Johnson	17	0	1	1	6.26	14
Ray Crone	14	1	2	0	6.75	7
Gordon Jones	11	3	1	1	2.37	8
Jim Constable	9	1	0	1	5.63	4
Dom Zanni	1	1	0	0	2.25	3
Joe Shipley	1	0	0	0	33.75	0

== Awards and honors ==
- Orlando Cepeda – National League Rookie of the Year

All-Star Game

== Farm system ==
Level	Team	League	Manager
AAA	Phoenix Giants	Pacific Coast League	Red Davis
AA	Corpus Christi Giants	Texas League	Ray Murray
A	Springfield Giants	Eastern League	Andy Gilbert
B	Danville Leafs	Carolina League	Bobby Hofman
C	Fresno Giants	California League	Mike McCormick
C	St. Cloud Rox	Northern League	Richie Klaus
D	Panama City Fliers	Alabama–Florida League	Bill Brightwell, Charles Clark, Joe Tipton and Charley Grant
D	Michigan City White Caps	Midwest League	Buddy Kerr
D	Hastings Giants	Nebraska State League	Leo Schrall
D	Artesia Giants	Sophomore League	Jodie Phipps

LEAGUE CHAMPIONS: Phoenix, Corpus Christi, Fresno
