= 1958 St. Louis Cardinals season =

Major League Baseball season

1958 St. Louis Cardinals
- League: National League
- Ballpark: Busch Stadium I
- City: St. Louis, Missouri
- Record: 72–82 (.468)
- League place: 5th
- Owners: August "Gussie" Busch
- General managers: Bing Devine
- Managers: Fred Hutchinson, Stan Hack
- Television: KTVI
- Radio: KMOX (Harry Caray, Jack Buck, Joe Garagiola)
- Stats: ESPN.com; Baseball Reference

The 1958 St. Louis Cardinals season was the team's 77th season in St. Louis, Missouri and its 67th season in the National League. The Cardinals went 72–82 during the season and finished sixth in the National League.

== Offseason ==
- December 2, 1957: 1957 minor league draft
  - Ellis Burton was drafted by the Cardinals from the Pittsburgh Pirates.
  - Lee Tate was drafted by the Cardinals from the San Francisco Giants.
- December 5, 1957: Marty Kutyna, Ted Wieand, and Willard Schmidt were traded by the Cardinals to the Cincinnati Redlegs for Curt Flood and Joe Taylor.

== Regular season ==
Third baseman Ken Boyer won a Gold Glove this year.

=== Season standings ===
National League
Team	W	L	Pct.	GB	Home	Road
Milwaukee Braves	92	62	.597	—	48‍–‍29	44‍–‍33
Pittsburgh Pirates	84	70	.545	8	49‍–‍28	35‍–‍42
San Francisco Giants	80	74	.519	12	44‍–‍33	36‍–‍41
Cincinnati Redlegs	76	78	.494	16	40‍–‍37	36‍–‍41
Chicago Cubs	72	82	.468	20	35‍–‍42	37‍–‍40
St. Louis Cardinals	72	82	.468	20	39‍–‍38	33‍–‍44
Los Angeles Dodgers	71	83	.461	21	39‍–‍38	32‍–‍45
Philadelphia Phillies	69	85	.448	23	35‍–‍42	34‍–‍43

=== Record vs. opponents ===
1958 National League record Sources:
Team	CHC	CIN	LAD	MIL	PHI	PIT	SF	STL
Chicago	—	10–12	11–11	10–12	13–9	9–13	12–10	7–15
Cincinnati	12–10	—	11–11	5–17	15–7	10–12	11–11	12–10
Los Angeles	11–11	11–11	—	14–8	10–12	8–14	6–16	11–11
Milwaukee	12–10	17–5	8–14	—	13–9	11–11	16–6	15–7
Philadelphia	9–13	7–15	12–10	9–13	—	12–10	8–14	12–10
Pittsburgh	13–9	12–10	14–8	11–11	10–12	—	12–10	12–10
San Francisco	10–12	11–11	16–6	6–16	14–8	10–12	—	13–9
St. Louis	15–7	10–12	11–11	7–15	10–12	10–12	9–13	—

=== Notable transactions ===
- April 2, 1958: Jim King was traded by the Cardinals to the San Francisco Giants for Ray Katt.
- April 19, 1958: Phil Paine was selected off waivers by the Cardinals from the Milwaukee Braves.
- May 20, 1958: Alvin Dark was traded by the Cardinals to the Chicago Cubs for Jim Brosnan.
- June 15, 1958: Dick Schofield and cash were traded by the Cardinals to the Pittsburgh Pirates for Johnny O'Brien and Gene Freese.
- July 2, 1958: Morrie Martin was selected off waivers from the Cardinals by the Cleveland Indians.
- September 29, 1958: Gene Freese was traded by the Cardinals to the Philadelphia Phillies for Solly Hemus.

=== Roster ===
1958 St. Louis Cardinals
Roster
Pitchers: 27 Frank Barnes; 37 Jim Brosnan; 27 Nelson Chittum; 22 Phil Clark; 44 Tom Flanigan; 39 Larry Jackson; 23 Sam Jones; 32 Bob Mabe; 43 Sal Maglie; 25 Morrie Martin; 41 Lindy McDaniel; 45 Von McDaniel; 17 Vinegar Bend Mizell; 22 Billy Muffett; 44 Phil Paine; 30 Bill Smith; 38 Chuck Stobbs; 37 Herm Wehmeier; 45 Bill Wight	Catchers: 21 Ray Katt; 16 Hobie Landrith; 18 Hal Smith; Infielders: 19 Rubén Amaro; 3 Don Blasingame; 14 Ken Boyer; 28 Joe Cunningham; 11 Alvin Dark; 24 Gene Freese; 10 Eddie Kasko; 6 Stan Musial; 19 Johnny O'Brien; 19 Dick Schofield; 19 Lee Tate; 24 Benny Valenzuela	Outfielders: 11 Ellis Burton; 7 Del Ennis; 42 Curt Flood; 12 Gene Green; 20 Wally Moon; 8 Irv Noren; 15 Bobby Gene Smith; 21 Joe Taylor	Manager: 35 Stan Hack; 29 Fred Hutchinson; Coaches: 35 Stan Hack; 33 Al Hollingsworth; 34 Terry Moore

== Player stats ==
=== Batting ===
==== Starters by position ====
Note: Pos = Position; G = Games played; AB = At bats; H = Hits; Avg. = Batting average; HR = Home runs; RBI = Runs batted in

Pos	Player	G	AB	H	Avg.	HR	RBI
C	Hal R. Smith	77	220	50	.227	1	24
1B	Stan Musial	135	472	159	.337	17	62
2B	Don Blasingame	143	547	150	.274	2	36
SS	Eddie Kasko	104	259	57	.220	2	22
3B	Ken Boyer	150	570	175	.307	23	90
LF	Del Ennis	106	329	86	.261	3	47
CF	Curt Flood	121	422	110	.261	10	41
RF	Gene Green	137	442	124	.281	13	55

==== Other batters ====
Note: G = Games played; AB = At bats; H = Hits; Avg. = Batting average; HR = Home runs; RBI = Runs batted in

Player	G	AB	H	Avg.	HR	RBI
Joe Cunningham	131	337	105	.312	12	57
Wally Moon	108	290	69	.238	7	38
Gene Freese	62	191	49	.257	6	16
Irv Noren	117	178	47	.264	4	22
Hobie Landrith	70	144	31	.215	3	13
Dick Schofield	39	108	23	.213	1	8
Bobby Smith	28	88	25	.284	2	5
Rubén Amaro	40	76	17	.224	0	0
Alvin Dark	18	64	19	.297	1	5
Ray Katt	19	41	7	.171	1	4
Lee Tate	10	35	7	.200	0	1
Ellis Burton	8	30	7	.233	2	4
Joe Taylor	18	23	7	.304	1	3
Benny Valenzuela	10	14	3	.214	0	0
Johnny O'Brien	12	2	0	.000	0	0

=== Pitching ===
==== Starting pitchers ====
Note: G = Games pitched; IP = Innings pitched; W = Wins; L = Losses; ERA = Earned run average; SO = Strikeouts

Player	G	IP	W	L	ERA	SO
Sam Jones	35	250.0	14	13	2.88	225
Vinegar Bend Mizell	30	189.2	10	14	3.42	80
Sal Maglie	10	53.0	2	6	4.75	21
Herm Wehmeier	3	6.0	0	1	13.50	4

==== Other pitchers ====
Note: G = Games pitched; IP = Innings pitched; W = Wins; L = Losses; ERA = Earned run average; SO = Strikeouts

Player	G	IP	W	L	ERA	SO
Larry Jackson	49	198.0	13	13	3.68	124
Jim Brosnan	33	115.0	8	4	3.44	65
Bob Mabe	31	111.2	3	9	4.51	74
Lindy McDaniel	26	108.2	5	7	5.80	47
Billy Muffett	35	84.0	4	6	4.93	41
Nelson Chittum	13	29.1	0	1	6.44	13
Frank Barnes	8	19.0	1	1	7.58	17
Bill Smith	2	9.2	0	1	6.52	4
Von McDaniel	2	2.0	0	0	13.50	0

==== Relief pitchers ====
Note: G = Games pitched; W = Wins; L = Losses; SV = Saves; ERA = Earned run average; SO = Strikeouts

Player	G	W	L	SV	ERA	SO
Phil Paine	46	5	1	1	3.56	45
Bill Wight	28	3	0	2	5.02	18
Chuck Stobbs	17	1	3	1	3.63	25
Morrie Martin	17	3	1	0	4.74	16
Phil Clark	7	0	1	1	3.52	1
Johnny O'Brien	1	0	0	0	22.50	2
Tom Flanigan	1	0	0	0	9.00	0

== Farm system ==
Level	Team	League	Manager
AAA	Omaha Cardinals	American Association	Johnny Keane
AAA	Rochester Red Wings	International League	Cot Deal
AA	Tecolotes de Nuevo Laredo	Mexican League	Jose Ramos
AA	Houston Buffaloes	Texas League	Harry Walker
A	York White Roses	Eastern League	Joe Schultz
B	Winston-Salem Red Birds	Carolina League	Vern Benson
C	Stockton Ports	California League	Don Pries
C	Winnipeg Goldeyes	Northern League	Al Unser
C	Billings Mustangs	Pioneer League	Chase Riddle
D	Dothan Cardinals	Alabama–Florida League	J. C. Dunn
D	Wytheville Cardinals	Appalachian League	Whitey Kurowski
D	Daytona Beach Islanders	Florida State League	Homer Ray Wilson
D	Albany Cardinals	Georgia–Florida League	Mo Mozzali
D	Keokuk Cardinals	Midwest League	Frank Calo
D	Hobbs Cardinals	Sophomore League	Wayne Wallace

LEAGUE CHAMPIONS: Nuevo Laredo, Dothan
