= 1958 Milwaukee Braves season =

1958 Milwaukee Braves
- National League champions
- League: National League
- Ballpark: Milwaukee County Stadium
- City: Milwaukee, Wisconsin
- Record: 92–62 (.597)
- League place: 1st
- Owners: Louis R. Perini
- General managers: John J. Quinn
- Managers: Fred Haney
- Radio: WEMP; WTMJ (Earl Gillespie, Blaine Walsh)

The 1958 Milwaukee Braves season was the sixth in Milwaukee and the 88th overall season of the franchise. The Braves finished first in the National League with a 92–62 record and returned to the World Series for the second consecutive year, losing to the New York Yankees in seven games. The Braves set a Major League record which still stands for the fewest players caught stealing in a season, with 8.

== Offseason ==
- December 1, 1958: Claude Raymond was drafted from the Braves by the Chicago White Sox in the 1958 rule 5 draft.
- Prior to 1958 season: Manny Jiménez was acquired by the Braves from Ciudad Juárez.
- Prior to 1958 season: In an unusual turn of events for a World Series champion, Braves' manager Fred Haney replaced all four members of his 1957 coaching staff after the Fall Classic triumph: third-base coach Connie Ryan, first-base coach Johnny Riddle, pitching coach Charlie Root, and bullpen coach Bob Keely. Root and Keely were holdovers from Charlie Grimm's staff, while Ryan was a former infielder and minor league manager for the Braves. Haney replaced them with Billy Herman, John Fitzpatrick, Whit Wyatt and George Susce. Herman and Wyatt were recruited from the Dodgers and Phillies respectively, and Susce was a veteran bullpen coach from the American League. Fitzpatrick had previously coached for Haney with the Pirates and in the Pacific Coast League.

== Regular season ==
=== Season summary ===
The core of the Braves team was once again Hank Aaron, Eddie Mathews, Joe Adcock, Warren Spahn, and Lew Burdette. Also, outfielder Bill Bruton came back from his season-ending injury in 1957 to play in 100 games. Aaron led the team with 196 hits, 109 runs scored, .326 batting average and 95 runs batted in, and Mathews led the team with 31 home runs.

However, in 1958 the Braves' third starting pitcher, Bob Buhl, was injured after pitching in just 11 games (winning five), which put even more pressure on Spahn, Burdette, and their manager Fred Haney to be able to win. Also, because of injuries, Adcock played in only 105 games, and Wes Covington played in just 90. Red Schoendienst played in just 106 games, including many as just a pinch hitter, and it was discovered the next year that he had tuberculosis. In this difficult situation, Spahn posted a 22–11 record in 290 innings pitched and 23 complete games, and Burdette had a 20–10 record in 275.1 innings.

The Braves repeated as the National League champions, this time by a margin of eight games over the Pittsburgh Pirates. The New York Yankees again won the American League, hence the two teams faced off against each other again in the World Series. The Braves roared ahead by winning three of the first four games for a 3–1 lead in the series. However, the Yankees regrouped and won games five, six, and seven—the final two in Milwaukee County Stadium, the Braves' home stadium—to win the World Championship.

=== Season standings ===
National League
| Team | W | L | Pct. | GB | Home | Road |
|---|---|---|---|---|---|---|
| Milwaukee Braves | 92 | 62 | .597 | — | 48‍–‍29 | 44‍–‍33 |
| Pittsburgh Pirates | 84 | 70 | .545 | 8 | 49‍–‍28 | 35‍–‍42 |
| San Francisco Giants | 80 | 74 | .519 | 12 | 44‍–‍33 | 36‍–‍41 |
| Cincinnati Redlegs | 76 | 78 | .494 | 16 | 40‍–‍37 | 36‍–‍41 |
| Chicago Cubs | 72 | 82 | .468 | 20 | 35‍–‍42 | 37‍–‍40 |
| St. Louis Cardinals | 72 | 82 | .468 | 20 | 39‍–‍38 | 33‍–‍44 |
| Los Angeles Dodgers | 71 | 83 | .461 | 21 | 39‍–‍38 | 32‍–‍45 |
| Philadelphia Phillies | 69 | 85 | .448 | 23 | 35‍–‍42 | 34‍–‍43 |

=== Record vs. opponents ===
1958 National League record Sources:
| Team | CHC | CIN | LAD | MIL | PHI | PIT | SF | STL |
|---|---|---|---|---|---|---|---|---|
| Chicago | — | 10–12 | 11–11 | 10–12 | 13–9 | 9–13 | 12–10 | 7–15 |
| Cincinnati | 12–10 | — | 11–11 | 5–17 | 15–7 | 10–12 | 11–11 | 12–10 |
| Los Angeles | 11–11 | 11–11 | — | 14–8 | 10–12 | 8–14 | 6–16 | 11–11 |
| Milwaukee | 12–10 | 17–5 | 8–14 | — | 13–9 | 11–11 | 16–6 | 15–7 |
| Philadelphia | 9–13 | 7–15 | 12–10 | 9–13 | — | 12–10 | 8–14 | 12–10 |
| Pittsburgh | 13–9 | 12–10 | 14–8 | 11–11 | 10–12 | — | 12–10 | 12–10 |
| San Francisco | 10–12 | 11–11 | 16–6 | 6–16 | 14–8 | 10–12 | — | 13–9 |
| St. Louis | 15–7 | 10–12 | 11–11 | 7–15 | 10–12 | 10–12 | 9–13 | — |

=== Opening Day lineup ===
| Red Schoendienst | 2B |
| Bob Hazle | RF |
| Eddie Mathews | 3B |
| Hank Aaron | CF |
| Frank Torre | 1B |
| Harry Hanebrink | LF |
| Johnny Logan | SS |
| Del Crandall | C |
| Warren Spahn | P |

=== Notable transactions ===
- June 13, 1958: Carl Sawatski was traded by the Braves to the Philadelphia Phillies for Joe Lonnett.

=== Roster ===
1958 Milwaukee Braves
Roster
| Pitchers: 10 Bob Buhl; 33 Lew Burdette; 22 Gene Conley; 47 Joey Jay; 32 Ernie Johnson; 25 Dick Littlefield; 20 Don McMahon; 34 Juan Pizarro; 49 Humberto Robinson; 17 Bob Rush; 21 Warren Spahn; 30 Bob Trowbridge; 16 Carl Willey | Catchers: 1 Del Crandall; 7 Del Rice; 15 Carl Sawatski; Infielders: 9 Joe Adcock; 11 Joe Koppe; 23 Johnny Logan; 41 Eddie Mathews; 12 Mel Roach; 4 Red Schoendienst; 14 Frank Torre; 27 Casey Wise | Outfielders: 44 Hank Aaron; 38 Bill Bruton; 43 Wes Covington; 18 John DeMerit; 11 Eddie Haas; 6,26 Harry Hanebrink; 12 Bob Hazle; 5 Félix Mantilla; 48 Andy Pafko; 19 Hawk Taylor; Other batters: 24 Bob Roselli | Manager: 2 Fred Haney; Coaches: 3 John Fitzpatrick; 8 Billy Herman; 35 George Susce; 31 Whit Wyatt |

== Player stats ==
| = Indicates team leader |

| = Indicates league leader |

=== Batting ===
==== Starters by position ====
Note: Pos = Position; G = Games played; AB = At bats; H = Hits; Avg. = Batting average; HR = Home runs; RBI = Runs batted in

| Pos | Player | G | AB | H | Avg. | HR | RBI |
|---|---|---|---|---|---|---|---|
| C | Del Crandall | 131 | 427 | 116 | .272 | 18 | 63 |
| 1B | Frank Torre | 138 | 372 | 115 | .309 | 6 | 55 |
| 2B | Red Schoendienst | 106 | 427 | 112 | .262 | 1 | 24 |
| SS | Johnny Logan | 145 | 530 | 120 | .226 | 11 | 53 |
| 3B | Eddie Mathews | 149 | 536 | 137 | .251 | 31 | 77 |
| LF | Wes Covington | 90 | 294 | 97 | .330 | 24 | 74 |
| CF | Bill Bruton | 100 | 325 | 91 | .280 | 3 | 28 |
| RF | Hank Aaron | 153 | 601 | 196 | .326 | 30 | 95 |

==== Other batters ====
Note: G = Games played; AB = At bats; H = Hits; Avg. = Batting average; HR = Home runs; RBI = Runs batted in

| Player | G | AB | H | Avg. | HR | RBI |
|---|---|---|---|---|---|---|
| Joe Adcock | 105 | 320 | 88 | .275 | 19 | 54 |
| Félix Mantilla | 85 | 226 | 50 | .221 | 7 | 19 |
| Andy Pafko | 95 | 164 | 39 | .238 | 3 | 23 |
| Mel Roach | 44 | 136 | 42 | .309 | 3 | 10 |
| Harry Hanebrink | 63 | 133 | 25 | .188 | 4 | 10 |
| Del Rice | 43 | 121 | 27 | .223 | 1 | 8 |
| Casey Wise | 31 | 71 | 14 | .197 | 0 | 0 |
| Bob Hazle | 20 | 56 | 10 | .179 | 0 | 5 |
| Eddie Haas | 9 | 14 | 5 | .357 | 0 | 1 |
| Carl Sawatski | 10 | 10 | 1 | .100 | 0 | 1 |
| Joe Koppe | 16 | 9 | 4 | .444 | 0 | 0 |
| Hawk Taylor | 4 | 8 | 1 | .125 | 0 | 0 |
| John DeMerit | 3 | 3 | 2 | .667 | 0 | 0 |
| Bob Roselli | 1 | 1 | 0 | .000 | 0 | 0 |

=== Pitching ===
==== Starting pitchers ====
Note: G = Games pitched; IP = Innings pitched; W = Wins; L = Losses; ERA = Earned run average; SO = Strikeouts

| Player | G | IP | W | L | ERA | SO |
|---|---|---|---|---|---|---|
| Warren Spahn | 38 | 290.0 | 22 | 11 | 3.07 | 150 |
| Lew Burdette | 40 | 275.1 | 20 | 10 | 2.91 | 113 |
| Bob Buhl | 11 | 73.0 | 5 | 2 | 3.45 | 27 |

==== Other pitchers ====
Note: G = Games pitched; IP = Innings pitched; W = Wins; L = Losses; ERA = Earned run average; SO = Strikeouts

| Player | G | IP | W | L | ERA | SO |
|---|---|---|---|---|---|---|
| Bob Rush | 28 | 147.1 | 10 | 6 | 3.42 | 84 |
| Carl Willey | 23 | 140.0 | 9 | 7 | 2.70 | 74 |
| Juan Pizarro | 16 | 96.2 | 6 | 4 | 2.70 | 84 |
| Joey Jay | 18 | 96.2 | 7 | 5 | 2.14 | 74 |
| Gene Conley | 26 | 72.0 | 0 | 6 | 4.88 | 53 |
| Bob Trowbridge | 27 | 55.0 | 1 | 3 | 3.93 | 31 |

==== Relief pitchers ====
Note: G = Games pitched; W = Wins; L = Losses; SV = Saves; ERA = Earned run average; SO = Strikeouts

| Player | G | W | L | SV | ERA | SO |
|---|---|---|---|---|---|---|
| Don McMahon | 38 | 7 | 2 | 8 | 3.68 | 37 |
| Humberto Robinson | 19 | 2 | 4 | 1 | 3.02 | 26 |
| Ernie Johnson | 15 | 3 | 1 | 1 | 8.10 | 13 |
| Dick Littlefield | 4 | 0 | 1 | 1 | 4.26 | 7 |

== 1958 World Series ==
=== Game 1 ===
October 1, 1958, at Milwaukee County Stadium in Milwaukee, Wisconsin

| Team | 1 | 2 | 3 | 4 | 5 | 6 | 7 | 8 | 9 | 10 | R | H | E |
|---|---|---|---|---|---|---|---|---|---|---|---|---|---|
| New York (A) | 0 | 0 | 0 | 1 | 2 | 0 | 0 | 0 | 0 | 0 | 3 | 8 | 1 |
| Milwaukee (N) | 0 | 0 | 0 | 2 | 0 | 0 | 0 | 1 | 0 | 1 | 4 | 10 | 0 |
W: Warren Spahn (1–0) L: Ryne Duren (0–1)
HR: NYY – Bill Skowron (1), Hank Bauer (1)

=== Game 2 ===
October 2, 1958, at Milwaukee County Stadium in Milwaukee, Wisconsin

| Team | 1 | 2 | 3 | 4 | 5 | 6 | 7 | 8 | 9 | R | H | E |
|---|---|---|---|---|---|---|---|---|---|---|---|---|
| New York (A) | 1 | 0 | 0 | 1 | 0 | 0 | 0 | 0 | 3 | 5 | 7 | 0 |
| Milwaukee (N) | 7 | 1 | 0 | 0 | 0 | 0 | 2 | 3 | x | 13 | 15 | 1 |
W: Lew Burdette (1–0) L: Bob Turley (0–1)
HR: NYY – Mickey Mantle (1, 2), Hank Bauer (2) MIL – Bill Bruton (1), Lew Burdette (1)

=== Game 3 ===
October 4, 1958, at Yankee Stadium in New York City

| Team | 1 | 2 | 3 | 4 | 5 | 6 | 7 | 8 | 9 | R | H | E |
|---|---|---|---|---|---|---|---|---|---|---|---|---|
| Milwaukee (N) | 0 | 0 | 0 | 0 | 0 | 0 | 0 | 0 | 0 | 0 | 6 | 0 |
| New York (A) | 0 | 0 | 0 | 0 | 2 | 0 | 2 | 0 | x | 4 | 4 | 0 |
W: Don Larsen (1–0) L: Bob Rush (0–1)
HR: NYY – Hank Bauer (3)

=== Game 4 ===
October 5, 1958, at Yankee Stadium in New York City

| Team | 1 | 2 | 3 | 4 | 5 | 6 | 7 | 8 | 9 | R | H | E |
|---|---|---|---|---|---|---|---|---|---|---|---|---|
| Milwaukee (N) | 0 | 0 | 0 | 0 | 0 | 1 | 1 | 1 | 0 | 3 | 9 | 0 |
| New York (A) | 0 | 0 | 0 | 0 | 0 | 0 | 0 | 0 | 0 | 0 | 2 | 1 |
W: Warren Spahn (2–0) L: Whitey Ford (0–1)

=== Game 5 ===
October 6, 1958, at Yankee Stadium in New York City

| Team | 1 | 2 | 3 | 4 | 5 | 6 | 7 | 8 | 9 | R | H | E |
|---|---|---|---|---|---|---|---|---|---|---|---|---|
| Milwaukee (N) | 0 | 0 | 0 | 0 | 0 | 0 | 0 | 0 | 0 | 0 | 5 | 0 |
| New York (A) | 0 | 0 | 1 | 0 | 0 | 6 | 0 | 0 | x | 7 | 10 | 0 |
W: Bob Turley (1–1) L: Lew Burdette (1–1)
HR: NYY – Gil McDougald (1)

=== Game 6 ===
October 8, 1958, at Milwaukee County Stadium in Milwaukee, Wisconsin

| Team | 1 | 2 | 3 | 4 | 5 | 6 | 7 | 8 | 9 | 10 | R | H | E |
|---|---|---|---|---|---|---|---|---|---|---|---|---|---|
| New York (A) | 1 | 0 | 0 | 0 | 0 | 1 | 0 | 0 | 0 | 2 | 4 | 10 | 1 |
| Milwaukee (N) | 1 | 1 | 0 | 0 | 0 | 0 | 0 | 0 | 0 | 1 | 3 | 10 | 4 |
W: Ryne Duren (1–1) L: Warren Spahn (2–1) S: Bob Turley (1)
HR: NYY – Hank Bauer (4), Gil McDougald (2)

=== Game 7 ===
October 9, 1958, at Milwaukee County Stadium in Milwaukee, Wisconsin

| Team | 1 | 2 | 3 | 4 | 5 | 6 | 7 | 8 | 9 | R | H | E |
|---|---|---|---|---|---|---|---|---|---|---|---|---|
| New York (A) | 0 | 2 | 0 | 0 | 0 | 0 | 0 | 4 | 0 | 6 | 8 | 0 |
| Milwaukee (N) | 1 | 0 | 0 | 0 | 0 | 1 | 0 | 0 | 0 | 2 | 5 | 2 |
W: Bob Turley (2–1) L: Lew Burdette (1–2)
HR: NYY – Bill Skowron (2) MIL – Del Crandall (1)

== Awards and honors ==
1958 Major League Baseball All-Star Game
Starters: Hank Aaron, Del Crandall, and Warren Spahn
Reserves: Eddie Mathews, Don McMahon

== Farm system ==
| Level | Team | League | Manager |
|---|---|---|---|
| AAA | Wichita Braves | American Association | Ben Geraghty |
| AAA | Sacramento Solons | Pacific Coast League | Sibby Sisti |
| AA | Atlanta Crackers | Southern Association | Bud Bates |
| AA | Austin Senators | Texas League | Peanuts Lowrey |
| A | Jacksonville Braves | Sally League | Joe Just and Chuck Buheller |
| A | Topeka Hawks | Western League | George McQuinn |
| B | Cedar Rapids Braves | Illinois–Indiana–Iowa League | Alex Monchak |
| B | Yakima Bears | Northwest League | Hub Kittle |
| C | Salinas Packers | California League | Vic Marasco and Al Forthmann |
| C | Eau Claire Braves | Northern League | Gordon Maltzberger |
| C | Boise Braves | Pioneer League | Billy Smith |
| D | Waycross Braves | Georgia–Florida League | Everett Robinson |
| D | McCook Braves | Nebraska State League | Bill Steinecke |
| D | Wellsville Braves | New York–Penn League | Harry Minor |
| D | Midland Braves | Sophomore League | Travis Jackson, Earle Halstead and Ernie White |

LEAGUE CHAMPIONS: Cedar Rapids, Yakima, Boise, Midland
