= LiPetri =

LiPetri is a surname. Notable people with the surname include:

- Angelo LiPetri (1929–2016), American baseball player
- Mike LiPetri (born 1990), American attorney and politician
