= Phil Clark (pitcher) =

American baseball player (1931–2018)

- Pitcher
- Born: October 3, 1931; Albany, Georgia, U.S.
- Died: September 14, 2018 (aged 86); Nashville, Tennessee, U.S.
- Batted: Right Threw: Right

MLB debut
- April 15, 1958, for the St. Louis Cardinals

Last MLB appearance
- April 29, 1959, for the St. Louis Cardinals

MLB statistics
- Win–loss record: 0–2
- Earned run average: 7.98
- Innings pitched: 14 2/3
- Stats at Baseball Reference

Teams
- St. Louis Cardinals (1958–1959)

Philip James Clark III (October 3, 1931 – September 14, 2018) was an American professional baseball player. The right-handed pitcher stood 6 feet 3 inches (1.91 m) tall and weighed 210 pounds (95 kg) during his active career (1951; 1953–61). Born in Albany, Georgia, he attended Georgia Southern University and was a United States Navy veteran of the Korean War.

Clark appeared in 14 games (all in relief) over two Major League seasons with the 1958–59 St. Louis Cardinals, dropping his only two decisions, allowing 19 hits, issuing 11 bases on balls and striking out six in 14 2/3 innings. He earned one save. However, he was a memorable and sympathetic figure in The Long Season, the breakthrough memoir of the 1959 baseball season written by his teammate Jim Brosnan. Clark and his family were neighbors of the Brosnan family during spring training in St. Petersburg, Florida, and the two pitchers became friends. While Brosnan was an established Major League pitcher, Clark was a fringe player constantly worried about being sent back to the minor leagues. As it turned out, both players were cast off by the Cardinals that season: Clark was sent to Triple-A Omaha at the May cutdown and later traded to the Los Angeles Dodgers; Brosnan was traded to the Cincinnati Reds in early June.

Clark was a successful minor league pitcher, going 81–58 over his career and posting 18 and 16-victory seasons, the latter in the Double-A Texas League. After leaving baseball, he was a teacher, coach and assistant school principal in his native Albany, retiring in 1988. Clark died in Nashville, Tennessee, at the age of 86.
