= Ted Kazanski =

American baseball player

- Shortstop
- Born: January 25, 1934 (age 92); Hamtramck, Michigan, U.S.
- Batted: Right Threw: Right

MLB debut
- September 28, 1953, for the Philadelphia Phillies

Last MLB appearance
- September 28, 1958, for the Philadelphia Phillies

MLB statistics
- Batting average: .217
- Home runs: 14
- Runs batted in: 116
- Games played: 417
- Stats at Baseball Reference

Teams
- Philadelphia Phillies (1953–1958)

Theodore Stanley Kazanski (born January 25, 1934) is an American former shortstop in Major League Baseball who played from 1953 through 1958 for the Philadelphia Phillies. Listed at 6 ft 1 in (1.85 m), 175 lb., he batted and threw right-handed.

A native of Hamtramck, Michigan, Kazanski was a classic slick fielder, slap-hitter, who used the entire field to his advantage. One of the most highly rated schoolboy ballplayers of his time, he was given a reported $100,000 bonus to sign with the Phillies in 1951. He spent two and a half seasons in the Philadelphia Minor League system before joining the big club in the 1953 midseason, at nineteen years of age.

In his majors debut, Kazanski went 3-for-6 and drove in four runs from the top of the order, to lead the Phillies to a 13–2 victory over the Chicago Cubs at Wrigley Field. Kazanski became the first player since 1920 – the first season runs batted in was recorded as an official statistic – to drive in at least four runs as a shortstop in his major league debut, according to the Elias Sports Bureau. He finished the season with a .217 batting average in 95 games.

In 1954 Kazanski was relegated to backup and platoon infield duties, splitting time with Bobby Morgan and Granny Hamner. He spent most of 1955 at Triple-A. His most productive season came in 1956, when he posted career-highs in games (117), home runs (4), RBI (34) and hits (80), while hitting .211. In that season, he belted a three-run home run (on April 22 ) and an inside-the-park grand slam (on August 8), to provide two of the 19 victories of Phillies pitching ace Robin Roberts. He also started a triple play in the same game as his inside the park grand slam, a feat that would not be duplicated until Ángel Pagán did so on May 19, 2010

From 1957 to 1958, he divided his playing time between Triple-A and the Phillies.

In a six-season major league career, Kazanski was a .217 hitter (288-for-1329) with 14 home runs and 116 RBI in 417 games, including 118 runs, 49 doubles, nine triples and four stolen bases.

In 1959, Kazanski was sent by Philadelphia along with Stan Lopata to the Milwaukee Braves in the same transaction that brought Gene Conley, Harry Hanebrink and Joe Koppe to the Phillies. He played in the Braves minor league system until 1963, when was traded to Detroit in exchange for Ozzie Virgil.

Kazanski also saw action in the minors with the Kansas City Athletics, Cleveland Indians, Los Angeles Angels, Washington Senators and New York Yankees organizations, hitting .253 with 70 home runs and 244 RBI in 1183 games until he retired after the 1964 season. He was through by the age of thirty years.

Following his playing career, Kazanski coached in the Detroit Tigers organization and also worked as an assistant for the baseball team at the University of Detroit Mercy, which he attended.
