= 1958 Cincinnati Redlegs season =

1958 Cincinnati Redlegs
- League: National League
- Ballpark: Crosley Field
- City: Cincinnati
- Owners: Powel Crosley Jr.
- General managers: Gabe Paul
- Managers: Birdie Tebbetts, Jimmy Dykes
- Television: WLW (George Bryson, Frank McCormick)
- Radio: WKRC (Waite Hoyt, Jack Moran)

The 1958 Cincinnati Redlegs season consisted of the Redlegs finishing in fourth place in the National League (NL) standings with a record of 76–78, 16 games behind the Milwaukee Braves. The Redlegs played their home games at Crosley Field, and drew 788,582 fans, eighth and last in the NL. The season started with Birdie Tebbetts managing the club, but after the Redlegs went 52–61, Tebbetts was replaced in August by Jimmy Dykes, who went 24–17 the rest of the way. This was the final season the team was known as the "Redlegs." The club reverted to its traditional "Reds" nickname the following year.

== Offseason ==
- October 8, 1957: Steve Bilko was purchased by the Redlegs from the Chicago Cubs.
- December 5, 1957: Curt Flood and Joe Taylor were traded by the Redlegs to the St. Louis Cardinals for Marty Kutyna, Ted Wieand, and Willard Schmidt.
- December 28, 1957: Ted Kluszewski was traded by the Redlegs to the Pittsburgh Pirates for Dee Fondy.

== Regular season ==
=== Season standings ===
National League
Team	W	L	Pct.	GB	Home	Road
Milwaukee Braves	92	62	.597	—	48‍–‍29	44‍–‍33
Pittsburgh Pirates	84	70	.545	8	49‍–‍28	35‍–‍42
San Francisco Giants	80	74	.519	12	44‍–‍33	36‍–‍41
Cincinnati Redlegs	76	78	.494	16	40‍–‍37	36‍–‍41
Chicago Cubs	72	82	.468	20	35‍–‍42	37‍–‍40
St. Louis Cardinals	72	82	.468	20	39‍–‍38	33‍–‍44
Los Angeles Dodgers	71	83	.461	21	39‍–‍38	32‍–‍45
Philadelphia Phillies	69	85	.448	23	35‍–‍42	34‍–‍43

=== Record vs. opponents ===
1958 National League record Sources:
Team	CHC	CIN	LAD	MIL	PHI	PIT	SF	STL
Chicago	—	10–12	11–11	10–12	13–9	9–13	12–10	7–15
Cincinnati	12–10	—	11–11	5–17	15–7	10–12	11–11	12–10
Los Angeles	11–11	11–11	—	14–8	10–12	8–14	6–16	11–11
Milwaukee	12–10	17–5	8–14	—	13–9	11–11	16–6	15–7
Philadelphia	9–13	7–15	12–10	9–13	—	12–10	8–14	12–10
Pittsburgh	13–9	12–10	14–8	11–11	10–12	—	12–10	12–10
San Francisco	10–12	11–11	16–6	6–16	14–8	10–12	—	13–9
St. Louis	15–7	10–12	11–11	7–15	10–12	10–12	9–13	—

=== Notable transactions ===
- April 21, 1958: Diego Seguí was released by the Redlegs.
- May 17, 1958: Eddie Miksis was signed as a free agent by the Redlegs.
- June 15, 1958: Steve Bilko, Johnny Klippstein and players to be named later were traded by the Redlegs to the Los Angeles Dodgers for Don Newcombe. The Redlegs completed the deal by sending Art Fowler and Charlie Rabe to the Dodgers on June 23.
- June 24, 1958: Walt Dropo was selected off waivers by the Redlegs from the Chicago White Sox.

=== Roster ===
1958 Cincinnati Redlegs
Roster
Pitchers: 40 Tom Acker; 30 Hersh Freeman; 32 Harvey Haddix; 31 Gene Hayden; 47 Jay Hook; 42 Hal Jeffcoat; 34,41 Alex Kellner; 45 Bob Kelly; 35 Johnny Klippstein; 46 Brooks Lawrence; 43 Turk Lown; 30,36 Don Newcombe; 39 Joe Nuxhall; 31 Jim O'Toole; 43 Orlando Peña; 37 Bob Purkey; 31 Charlie Rabe; 44 Willard Schmidt; 33 Ted Wieand; 47 Bill Wight	Catchers: 6 Ed Bailey; 7 Smoky Burgess; 9 Dutch Dotterer; Infielders: 18 Steve Bilko; 15 George Crowe; 18 Walt Dropo; 19 Dee Fondy; 10 Alex Grammas; 33 Fred Hatfield; 17 Bobby Henrich; 12 Don Hoak; 11 Roy McMillan; 16 Johnny Temple	Outfielders: 25 Gus Bell; 23 Chuck Coles; 26 Jim Fridley; 24 Jerry Lynch; 28 Eddie Miksis; 45 Danny Morejón; 5 Vada Pinson; 20 Frank Robinson; 22 Bob Thurman; 29 Pete Whisenant	Manager: 1 Birdie Tebbetts; 4 Jimmy Dykes; Coaches: 4 Jimmy Dykes; 3 Tom Ferrick; 2 Johnny Riddle

== Player stats ==
= Indicates team leader

=== Batting ===
==== Starters by position ====
Note: Pos = Position; G = Games played; AB = At bats; H = Hits; Avg. = Batting average; HR = Home runs; RBI = Runs batted in

Pos	Player	G	AB	H	Avg.	HR	RBI
C	Ed Bailey	112	360	90	.250	11	59
1B	George Crowe	111	345	95	.275	7	61
2B	Johnny Temple	141	542	166	.306	3	47
SS	Roy McMillan	145	393	90	.229	1	25
3B	Don Hoak	114	417	109	.261	6	50
LF	Frank Robinson	148	554	149	.269	31	83
CF	Gus Bell	112	385	97	.252	10	46
RF	Jerry Lynch	122	420	131	.312	16	68

==== Other batters ====
Note: G = Games played; AB = At bats; H = Hits; Avg. = Batting average; HR = Home runs; RBI = Runs batted in

Player	G	AB	H	Avg.	HR	RBI
Smoky Burgess	99	251	71	.283	6	31
Alex Grammas	105	216	47	.218	0	12
Pete Whisenant	85	203	48	.236	11	40
Bob Thurman	94	178	41	.230	4	20
Walt Dropo	63	162	47	.290	7	31
Dee Fondy	89	124	27	.218	1	11
Vada Pinson	27	96	26	.271	1	8
Steve Bilko	31	87	23	.264	4	17
Eddie Miksis	69	50	7	.140	0	4
Dutch Dotterer	11	28	7	.250	1	2
Danny Morejón	12	26	5	.192	0	1
Chuck Coles	9	11	2	.182	0	2
Jim Fridley	5	9	2	.222	0	1
Bobby Henrich	5	3	0	.000	0	0
Fred Hatfield	3	1	0	.000	0	0

=== Pitching ===
==== Starting pitchers ====
Note: G = Games pitched; IP = Innings pitched; W = Wins; L = Losses; ERA = Earned run average; SO = Strikeouts

Player	G	IP	W	L	ERA	SO
Bob Purkey	37	250.0	17	11	3.60	70
Harvey Haddix	29	184.0	8	7	3.52	110
Joe Nuxhall	36	175.2	12	11	3.79	111
Don Newcombe	20	133.1	7	7	3.85	53
Jim O'Toole	1	7.0	0	1	1.29	4
Jay Hook	1	3.0	0	1	12.00	5

==== Other pitchers ====
Note: G = Games pitched; IP = Innings pitched; W = Wins; L = Losses; ERA = Earned run average; SO = Strikeouts

Player	G	IP	W	L	ERA	SO
Brooks Lawrence	46	181.0	8	13	4.13	74
Tom Acker	38	124.2	4	3	4.55	90
Alex Kellner	18	82.0	7	3	2.30	42
Johnny Klippstein	12	33.0	3	2	4.91	22
Charlie Rabe	9	18.2	0	3	4.34	10
Bob Kelly	2	2.0	0	0	4.50	1

==== Relief pitchers ====
Note: G = Games pitched; W = Wins; L = Losses; SV = Saves; ERA = Earned run average; SO = Strikeouts

Player	G	W	L	SV	ERA	SO
Hal Jeffcoat	49	6	8	9	3.72	35
Willard Schmidt	41	3	5	0	2.86	41
Turk Lown	11	0	2	0	5.40	9
Orlando Peña	9	1	0	3	0.60	11
Bill Wight	7	0	1	0	4.05	5
Hersh Freeman	3	0	0	0	3.52	7
Gene Hayden	3	0	0	0	4.91	3
Ted Wieand	1	0	0	0	9.00	2

== Farm system ==
Level	Team	League	Manager
AAA	Havana Sugar Kings	International League	Nap Reyes and Tony Pacheco
AAA	Seattle Rainiers	Pacific Coast League	Connie Ryan
AA	Nashville Vols	Southern Association	Dick Sisler
A	Savannah Redlegs	Sally League	Bob Wellman
A	Albuquerque Dukes	Western League	Jimmy Brown
B	Wenatchee Chiefs	Northwest League	Bert Haas
C	Visalia Redlegs	California League	Bruce Edwards, Bobby Mattick and Larry Taylor
D	Graceville Oilers	Alabama–Florida League	Mike Fandozzi
D	Palatka Redlegs	Florida State League	Johnny Vander Meer
D	Geneva Redlegs	New York–Penn League	Dave Bristol

LEAGUE CHAMPIONS: Geneva
