= Mack Burk =

American baseball player (born 1935)

- Pinch runner / Pinch hitter / Catcher
- Born: April 21, 1935 (age 91); Nacogdoches, Texas, U.S.
- Batted: Right Threw: Right

MLB debut
- May 25, 1956, for the Philadelphia Phillies

Last MLB appearance
- June 22, 1958, for the Philadelphia Phillies

MLB statistics
- Games played: 16
- At bats: 2
- Hits: 1
- Runs scored: 3
- Stats at Baseball Reference

Teams
- Philadelphia Phillies (1956; 1958)

Mack Edwin Burk (born April 21, 1935) is an American former professional baseball catcher, who played in Major League Baseball (MLB) for the 1956 and 1958 Philadelphia Phillies. Of his 16 big league game appearances, 13 were as a pinch runner, two as a pinch hitter, and only one inning as a catcher.

Burk stood 6 feet 4 inches (1.93 m) tall, weighed 180 pounds (82 kg) and threw and batted right-handed. He attended the University of Texas at Austin and signed a $40,000 bonus contract with the Phillies in September 1955. Under the rules of the day, a "bonus baby" such as Burk was compelled to spend his first two years as a professional baseball player on a Major League roster. In his pro debut, on May 25, 1956, Burk pinch-ran for catcher Andy Seminick, in a home game against the Pittsburgh Pirates at Connie Mack Stadium. In Burk’s third game, on June 5, he pinch hit for pitcher Curt Simmons in the fifth inning and singled off left-hander Joe Nuxhall of the Cincinnati Redlegs. Burk came around to score his first big-league run that inning on a sacrifice fly by Stan Lopata. Burk scored two more runs during the 1956 season, both as a pinch runner. In his lone appearance in the field, Burk caught one inning, the bottom of the eighth, in relief of Lopata on July 15 against the St. Louis Cardinals, and handled one chance flawlessly.

Burk missed the entire 1957 season due to military service. But in 1958, he returned to baseball and was able to gain much-needed playing time in minor league baseball. Burk also played in one game with the Phillies. In his second big-league plate appearance and at bat, Burk was called upon to pinch hit for Phils' pitcher Ray Semproch in the 14th inning of a game against the San Francisco Giants, and he was called out on strikes against veteran Johnny Antonelli. It would be Burk's final MLB appearance. All told, he collected three runs scored, and one single in his two at bats for a career batting average of .500.

Burk continued his career in the minors through 1960 in the Phillies' farm system before leaving pro baseball.
