= Jim Owens (baseball) =

American baseball player and coach (1934–2020)

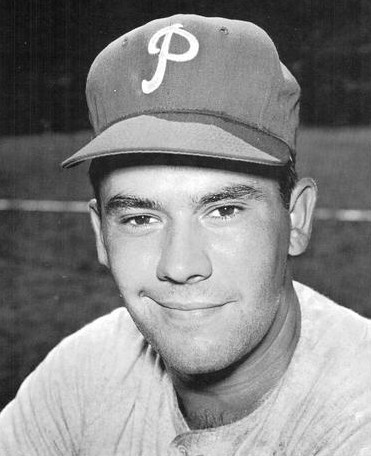
- Owens in 1961
- Pitcher
- Born: January 16, 1934; Gifford, Pennsylvania, U.S.
- Died: September 8, 2020 (aged 86); Houston, Texas, U.S.
- Batted: Right Threw: Right

MLB debut
- April 19, 1955, for the Philadelphia Phillies

Last MLB appearance
- June 20, 1967, for the Houston Astros

MLB statistics
- Win–loss record: 42–68
- Earned run average: 4.31
- Strikeouts: 516
- Stats at Baseball Reference

Teams
- Philadelphia Phillies (1955–1956, 1958–1962); Cincinnati Reds (1963); Houston Colt .45s / Astros (1964–1967)

James Philip Owens (January 16, 1934 – September 8, 2020), nicknamed "Bear", was an American professional baseball right-handed pitcher and pitching coach, who played in Major League Baseball (MLB) between 1955 and 1967 for the Philadelphia Phillies, Cincinnati Reds and Houston Colt .45s / Astros. He appeared in 286 big league games. During his playing days, Owens stood 5 feet 11 inches (1.80 m) tall, weighing 190 pounds (86 kg).

== Early baseball career ==
Originally signed by the Philadelphia Phillies in 1951 as an amateur free agent out of Bradford Area High School. Owens racked up impressive win totals in minor league baseball, with 22, 22 and 17 victories posted in levels ranging from Class D to Triple-A from 1952 to 1954.

In 1955, he made the Phillies' Opening Day roster and started two April games. In his debut April 19 against the eventual 1955 world champion Brooklyn Dodgers, Owens was effective for his first five innings pitched, allowing only two runs to the powerful Dodgers. But in the sixth, after a 36-minute rain delay, Owens surrendered home runs to Carl Furillo and Roy Campanella and was chased from the mound with the Phillies trailing, 5–0. Five days later, starting against 1955's cellar-dwellers, the Pittsburgh Pirates, he lasted only 1 2/3 innings before, struggling with his control, he was removed from the game. Philadelphia lost the game 6–1 and Owens absorbed his second straight loss. Owens was sent back to the Triple-A Syracuse Chiefs, where he had another banner year, winning 15 games before his recall in September 1955.

The 1956 season began in similar fashion, as Owens was treated harshly in two early-season starts (against the Pirates and the Cincinnati Redlegs). He worked in ten MLB games that year (five in relief), and got into 15 games at Triple-A. He was winless in four decisions for the 1956 Phillies, and his record in his first two years in the National League was poor: 0–6, with an earned run average of 7.51.

== One stellar season for the Phillies ==
Owens then spent all of 1957, and all but one game in 1958, in military service. In his one game pitched in 1958, on September 23 against the pennant-bound Milwaukee Braves, he hurled seven strong innings for the win, allowing two earned runs.

His best season was 1959: to complement a solid ERA of 3.21, Owens went 12–12 for a last-place team, with 11 complete games and 135 strikeouts in 221 1/3 innings of work. But in 1960, he went 4–14 (5.04) and in 1961 his record was 5–10 (4.47). The Phillies finished in the NL basement each season, and Owens received notoriety for his off-field carousing as a member (with fellow pitchers Turk Farrell, Jack Meyer and Seth Morehead) of the "Dalton Gang," a group of hard-drinking players in frequent conflict with the Phillies' management. After Owens' poor 1962 season—a 2–4 record with a 6.33 ERA—the Phillies traded him to Cincinnati for second baseman Cookie Rojas.

He was used almost entirely as a reliever in a partial season with the 1963 Reds. On April 21 of that year, he set a National League record by balking three times in one inning. (Bob Shaw broke that record less than a month later when he balked five times in a game.)

Overall, Owens posted an ERA of 5.31 in 19 games that year, including three starting assignments. He was sent to Triple-A San Diego, where he appeared in eight games. Then, in December, the Astros (then nicknamed the Colt .45s) took him in the 1963 Rule 5 draft.

== Reliever and coach for the Astros ==
Owens spent the final four seasons of his career with the Astros, reunited with Farrell until May 8, 1967, when Farrell was traded. Owens was used almost entirely as a reliever for Houston, pitching in a total of 148 games and starting only 11 (all in 1964). Owens led the team in relief appearances in 1965 with 50. He played his final big league game on June 20, 1967.

Eighteen days later, on July 8, Owens retired from the field to become the Astros' pitching coach, succeeding the fired Gordon Jones. He held that job through the end of the 1972 season, working with hurlers such as Mike Cuellar, Larry Dierker and Don Wilson.

Overall, Owens' pitching record was 42–68 with a 4.31 ERA. Of the 286 games he appeared in, he started 103 of them, completing 21 of the starts and tossing one shutout. In 885 1/3 innings, he gave up 84 home runs, walked 340 batters and struck out 516.

In 218 at-bats, Owens collected only 22 hits for a .101 batting average and struck out 102 times. He had a .954 fielding percentage.

Preceded by Gordon Jones	Houston Astros pitching coach 1967–1972	Succeeded by Hub Kittle
