= Gabe Gabler =

American baseball player (1930–2014)

- Pinch hitter
- Born: August 4, 1930; St. Louis, Missouri, U.S.
- Died: January 4, 2014 (aged 83); St. Louis, Missouri, U.S.
- Batted: Left Threw: Right

MLB debut
- September 16, 1958, for the Chicago Cubs

Last MLB appearance
- September 21, 1958, for the Chicago Cubs

MLB statistics
- Games played: 3
- At bats: 3
- Hits: 0
- Stats at Baseball Reference

Teams
- Chicago Cubs (1958)

William Louis "Gabe" Gabler (August 4, 1930 – January 4, 2014) was an American professional baseball first baseman who appeared in three games in Major League Baseball (MLB) for the Chicago Cubs in 1958. Appearing exclusively as a pinch hitter for the Cubs, he struck out three times in three at-bats. The native of St. Louis, Missouri, batted left-handed and threw right-handed and was listed as 6 feet 1 inch (1.85 m) tall and 190 pounds (86 kg).

== Education and career in baseball ==
Gabler attended Central High School in St. Louis. His 11-season pro career began in 1950, when he signed with the Brooklyn Dodgers as an amateur free agent. He played in the Dodgers' farm system through 1955, and eventually was acquired by the Cubs the following year after he bounced around two other MLB organizations. Gabler was a power hitter in the minor leagues, posting double-digit home run totals in all 11 seasons in which he played. In 1961—Gabler's last year as an active player—his 30 home runs led the Double-A Southern Association.

During Gabler's only MLB trial, in September 1958, he fanned against the Philadelphia Phillies' Don Erickson (on the 16th), then against the Los Angeles Dodgers' Ralph Mauriello (on the 19th) and Johnny Klippstein (on the 21st).

== Death ==
Gabler died in St. Louis in 2014.
