= Chick King =

American baseball player (1930–2012)

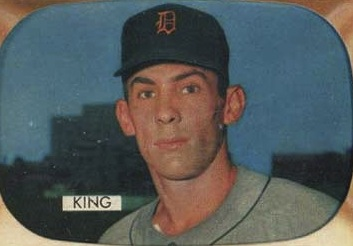
- Outfielder
- Born: November 10, 1930; Paris, Tennessee, U.S.
- Died: July 9, 2012 (aged 81); Paris, Tennessee, U.S.
- Batted: Right Threw: Right

MLB debut
- August 27, 1954, for the Detroit Tigers

Last MLB appearance
- May 30, 1959, for the St. Louis Cardinals

MLB statistics
- Batting average: .237
- Home runs: 0
- Runs batted in: 5
- Stats at Baseball Reference

Teams
- Detroit Tigers (1954–1956); Chicago Cubs (1958–1959); St. Louis Cardinals (1959)

Charles Gilbert "Chick" King (November 10, 1930 – July 9, 2012) was an American Major League Baseball outfielder who played for the Detroit Tigers (1954–1956), Chicago Cubs (1958–1959), and St. Louis Cardinals (1959).

== Biography ==
Born in Paris, Tennessee, King was the youngest of seven sons. He played football, basketball, baseball, and ran track at Grove High School. He obtained the nickname "Chick" as a boy. Years later, he told a reporter, "I don't know how I got it, but I was young. And it has been with me ever since." As a senior, he was named to the All-American high school football team. In August 1950, King appeared in the All-American high school football game and ran 91 yards for a touchdown on the opening play of the second half. He initially signed to attend the University of Georgia, but he was ruled ineligible by the Southeastern Conference after an investigation of "scholarship inducements." He opted instead to attend Memphis State College where he was a star football player in 1950. He also competed in basketball, baseball and track at Memphis State.

In April 1951, he signed with the Detroit Tigers to play professional baseball. Memphis State football coach Ralph Hately complained at the time, "It's a terrible condition when guys can come on your campus and lure your athletes away from their college educations. It isn't fair for major league clubs to pull a stunt like this."

King played in Detroit's farm system from 1951 to 1954. In late August 1954, he was playing for the Buffalo Bisons, the International League team affiliated with the Detroit Tigers when two Detroit outfielders, Bill Tuttle and Al Kaline were injured. King was called up to the Tigers and made his Major League Baseball debut on August 27, 1954. Following his debut against the New York Yankees, The Sporting News called King "a towering 190-pounder" and a "swift outfielder" who had stolen 31 bases for Buffalo. He appeared in 25 games for the Tigers between 1954 and 1956.

In February 1957, the Tigers traded King and a player to be named later to the Milwaukee Braves in exchange for Jack Dittmer. He was immediately assigned to the Braves' American Association farm club in Wichita, Kansas. King remained in the minor leagues for the 1957 season before he was sent from Wichita to the Cubs farm club in Fort Worth, Texas in December, 1957.

King briefly returned to the majors, appearing in eight games for the Chicago Cubs in 1958. He spent most of the 1958 season with the minor league team in Fort Worth, Texas. In May 1959, he was traded by the Cubs to the St. Louis Cardinals in exchange for Irv Noren. He played in five games for the Cardinals, the last on May 30, 1959.

Over five seasons in the big leagues, King played in 45 games, 29 as an outfielder and the rest as a pinch hitter. He hit .237 with a .306 on-base percentage.

King continued to play minor league baseball until 1961.
