= Bob Trowbridge =

American baseball player (1930-1980)

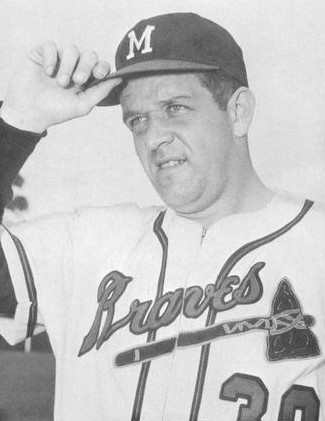
- Pitcher
- Born: June 27, 1930; Hudson, New York, U.S.
- Died: April 3, 1980 (aged 49); Hudson, New York, U.S.
- Batted: Right Threw: Right

MLB debut
- April 22, 1956, for the Milwaukee Braves

Last MLB appearance
- July 24, 1960, for the Kansas City Athletics

MLB statistics
- Win–loss record: 13–13
- Earned run average: 3.95
- Strikeouts: 201
- Stats at Baseball Reference

Teams
- Milwaukee Braves (1956–1959); Kansas City Athletics (1960)

Career highlights and awards
- World Series champion (1957)

Robert Trowbridge (June 27, 1930 – April 3, 1980) was an American professional baseball player, a pitcher who appeared in all or parts of five seasons (1956–60) for the Milwaukee Braves and Kansas City Athletics. A right-hander, he was listed as 6 feet 1 inch (1.85 m) tall and 180 pounds (82 kg). He was a member of the 1957 World Series champion Braves.

== Playing career ==
=== Minor leagues ===
Born in Hudson, New York, Trowbridge was signed in 1950 by the Boston Braves, and won 16 games in his debut season in the Class C Northern League. He then spent three full seasons (1951–53) in the United States Air Force during the Korean War. Trowbridge resumed his baseball career in 1954, winning 18 games in the Class A Sally League.

=== Major League Baseball ===
After he followed that by posting a 13–8 record in Triple-A in 1955, Trowbridge made the Braves' MLB roster in 1956 out of spring training. He was used sparingly as a relief pitcher in the season's early weeks and sent back to Triple-A in May to get more work. Recalled at the end of June, he became a "swing man" on the Milwaukee pitching staff, getting four starts and 13 relief assignments over the rest of the season. He notched his first MLB complete game on August 8 in a six-hit, 10–1 triumph over the St. Louis Cardinals at Milwaukee County Stadium. As a rookie, he posted a career-best 2.66 earned run average in 502/3 innings pitched.

In 1957, Trowbridge worked in 32 games as a member of the Brave staff, sandwiched around a three-game stint at Triple-A. He won an MLB-career-high seven games and worked in 126 innings, another career mark. Trowbridge again was a swing man, with 16 starts and 16 relief appearances. On September 2, he threw a complete game shutout, a three-hitter against the Chicago Cubs at Wrigley Field, striking out nine. It would be the only shutout of his big-league career. But his seven victories contributed to the Braves' 1957 National League pennant, their first title in nine years and their first in Milwaukee. In the 1957 World Series, he appeared in one inning in relief of Game 3. Inheriting a 7–3 deficit to the New York Yankees, Trowbridge allowed only two hits, but he issued three bases on balls and surrendered five earned runs, three of them coming on a home run by Tony Kubek. It would be his only Fall Classic appearance, but the Braves triumphed in seven games to become world champions.

His first two major league seasons would prove to be Trowbridge's best. He spent all of both 1958 and 1959 with Milwaukee, but worked in only 43 total games (with four starts), and was not called upon when the Braves made a return trip to the World Series in 1958. His final appearance in 1959, and as a Brave, occurred on August 18, five weeks before Milwaukee met the Los Angeles Dodgers in the 1959 National League tie-breaker series. The Braves sold Trowbridge's contract during the 1959–60 off-season to the Kansas City Athletics, a second-division team in the American League, and he finished his MLB career there in 1960, making one start and relieving in 21 other games before being sent to Triple-A. He ended his pro career in 1961.

As a major leaguer, Trowbridge compiled a 13–13 record with a 3.95 earned run average and 201 strikeouts in 116 appearances and 3301/3 innings pitched, allowing 324 hits and 156 bases on balls. He had four complete games, one shutout and five saves.

Trowbridge died in Hudson at the age of 49 from a fatal blood clot in 1980.
