= John Fitzgerald (1950s pitcher) =

American baseball player (born 1933)

- Pitcher
- Born: September 15, 1933 (age 92); Brooklyn, New York, U.S.
- Batted: Left Threw: Left

MLB debut
- September 28, 1958, for the San Francisco Giants

Last MLB appearance
- September 28, 1958, for the San Francisco Giants

MLB statistics
- Games pitched: 1
- Innings pitched: 3
- Earned run average: 3.00
- Stats at Baseball Reference

Teams
- San Francisco Giants (1958)

John Francis Fitzgerald (born September 15, 1933) is an American former professional baseball player who pitched one game in Major League Baseball with the 1958 San Francisco Giants. Born in Brooklyn, he threw and batted left-handed, stood 6 feet 3 inches (1.91 m) tall and weighed 190 pounds (86 kg).

Fitzgerald was playing American Legion Baseball in New York City in 1952 when he was signed by the New York Giants and assigned to the Northern League.

On September 28, 1958, at Seals Stadium — in the last game of the 1958 MLB season — he pitched in one games for the Giants, started it, and threw three innings against the St. Louis Cardinals. He struck out three batters, and gave up just one hit, a home run to Joe Cunningham. His three strikeouts came in the second inning when he fanned the side, setting down Ken Boyer (an 11-time All-Star and future National League MVP), Gene Green, and Bobby Gene Smith. The Giants then defeated the Cardinals, 7–2, with relief pitcher Dom Zanni getting credit for the win.

Fitzgerald returned to the minor leagues in 1959 and left baseball in 1960.
