= Nick Testa =

American baseball player (1928-2018)

- Catcher
- Born: June 29, 1928; New York City, New York, U.S.
- Died: November 16, 2018 (aged 90); Hastings-on-Hudson, New York, U.S.
- Batted: Right Threw: Right

Professional debut
- MLB: April 23, 1958, for the San Francisco Giants
- NPB: April 8, 1962, for the Damai Orions

Last appearance
- MLB: April 23, 1958, for the San Francisco Giants
- NPB: September 20, 1962, for the Damai Orions

MLB statistics
- Games played: 1
- At bats: 0
- hits: 0

NPB statistics
- Batting average: .136
- Home runs: 0
- Runs batted in: 5
- Stats at Baseball Reference

Teams
- San Francisco Giants (1958); Daimai Orions (1962)

Nicholas Testa (June 29, 1928 – November 16, 2018) was an American professional baseball catcher and coach. He played briefly in both Major League Baseball and Nippon Professional Baseball.

== Biography ==
Testa was born in New York City to Italian immigrants, and was raised in the Bronx. He began his professional career in 1946 at the age of 17 with the Newburgh Hummingbirds. He threw and batted right-handed, stood 5 feet 8 inches (1.73 m) tall and weighed 180 pounds (82 kg).

Testa had one of the briefest major league careers ever. He played just one inning of one game for the San Francisco Giants in 1958, never coming to bat in the major leagues. In his one chance on defense, he committed an error. Later that season, Testa was named the team's bullpen coach.

Testa played for several more seasons in the minor leagues, eventually making his way to Japan in 1962. That year, he played in 57 games for the Daimai Orions, batting .136 with five RBI. Testa later served as a coach for the St. Lucie Legends in the Senior Professional Baseball Association during their lone year of existence in 1989. He also coached baseball at Lehman College.

After retiring from Lehman, Testa joined the New York Yankees as their batting practice coach, serving on five World Championship Teams. Testa died in 2018 at his home in Hastings-on-Hudson, New York, at the age of 90.

== See also ==
- List of Florida Gators baseball players
