= Angelo LiPetri =

American baseball player (1929-2016)

- Pitcher
- Born: July 6, 1929; Brooklyn, New York, U.S.
- Died: November 17, 2016 (aged 87); Farmingdale, New York, U.S.
- Batted: Right Threw: Right

MLB debut
- April 25, 1956, for the Philadelphia Phillies

Last MLB appearance
- May 10, 1958, for the Philadelphia Phillies

MLB statistics
- Win–loss record: 0–0
- Earned run average: 5.40
- Innings pitched: 15
- Stats at Baseball Reference

Teams
- Philadelphia Phillies (1956, 1958)

Michael Angelo LiPetri (July 6, 1929 – November 17, 2016) was an American professional baseball player. A right-handed pitcher who stood 6 feet 1 inch (1.85 m) tall and weighed 180 pounds (82 kg), he appeared in ten Major League Baseball games for the 1956 and 1958 Philadelphia Phillies.

LiPetri graduated from Bushwick High School in Brooklyn before beginning a professional baseball career in 1950. After his first season in the minors, he spent fourteen months in the United States Army.

LiPetri won 15 of 17 decisions for the Granby Phillies of the Class C Provincial League in 1953 and he compiled a .628 winning percentage in 78 decisions during his seven-year minor league baseball career, which stretched from 1953 to 1959. In parts of two MLB seasons, he allowed nine earned runs and 13 hits over 15 innings of work, striking out nine and walking three.

LiPetri died on November 17, 2016, and is buried at Cemetery of the Holy Rood in Westbury, New York.
