= Carl Sawatski =

American baseball player (1927–1991)

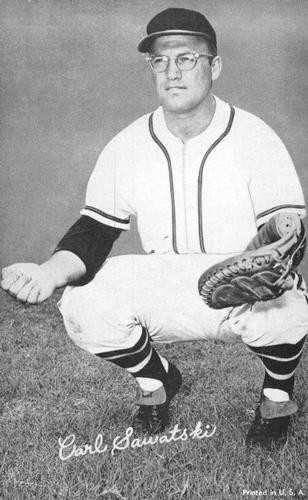
- Catcher
- Born: November 4, 1927; Shickshinny, Pennsylvania, U.S.
- Died: November 24, 1991 (aged 64); Little Rock, Arkansas, U.S.
- Batted: Left Threw: Right

MLB debut
- September 29, 1948, for the Chicago Cubs

Last MLB appearance
- September 29, 1963, for the St. Louis Cardinals

MLB statistics
- Batting average: .242
- Home runs: 58
- Runs batted in: 213
- Stats at Baseball Reference

Teams
- Chicago Cubs (1948, 1950, 1953); Chicago White Sox (1954); Milwaukee Braves (1957–1958); Philadelphia Phillies (1958–1959); St. Louis Cardinals (1960–1963)

Career highlights and awards
- World Series champion (1957)

Carl Ernest Sawatski (November 4, 1927 – November 24, 1991) was an American professional baseball player and executive. In the Major Leagues, he was a catcher for the Chicago Cubs (1948, 1950 and 1953), Chicago White Sox (1954), Milwaukee Braves (1957–1958), Philadelphia Phillies (1958–1959) and St. Louis Cardinals (1960–1963). He also was an influential figure in minor league baseball.

A native of Shickshinny, Pennsylvania, Sawatski grew up in the Mountain View section of Wayne, New Jersey. He attended Pompton Lakes High School in Pompton Lakes, New Jersey, where he played football and basketball, in addition to baseball.

A left-handed batter who threw right-handed, Sawatski the player stood 5 ft 10 in (1.78 m) (178 cm) tall and weighed 210 pounds (95 kg). He played 11 seasons in MLB, appearing in 633 games. His career totals include 1,449 at bats, 133 runs, 351 hits, 46 doubles, five triples, 58 home runs, 213 runs batted in, two stolen bases and 191 walks, and batted .242.

Sawatski helped the Braves win the 1957 National League pennant, appearing in 58 games, 19 as a catcher (third-most among the club's backstops), and contributing six home runs to the Milwaukee cause. During the 1957 World Series against the New York Yankees, Sawatski had two appearances as a pinch hitter (Games 3 and 6) and struck out each time, but the Braves prevailed in seven games to win the world title.

Sawatski was a prodigious minor league hitter. He batted .352 and slugged 34 homers in the Class D North Atlantic League in 1947. Then, two seasons later, he led the Double-A Southern Association with 45 homers and batted .360, second in the league, while playing for the Nashville Vols.. After his playing career ended, Sawatski served as the general manager of the Arkansas Travelers of the Double-A Texas League, a Cardinal affiliate, from 1967 to 1975. He then was elected president of the Texas League itself and served in the post from 1976 until his 1991 death in Little Rock at the age of 64. During his presidency, the league prospered as part of the renaissance of minor league baseball that began in the 1980s.

Preceded by Bobby Bragan	Texas League president 1976–1991	Succeeded by Tom Kayser
