= Don Erickson =

American baseball player (1931-2012)

- Pitcher
- Born: December 13, 1931; Springfield, Illinois, U.S.
- Died: August 1, 2012 (aged 80); Springfield, Illinois, U.S.
- Batted: Right Threw: Right

MLB debut
- September 1, 1958, for the Philadelphia Phillies

Last MLB appearance
- September 19, 1958, for the Philadelphia Phillies

MLB statistics
- Win–loss record: 0–1
- Earned run average: 4.63
- Strikeouts: 9
- Stats at Baseball Reference

Teams
- Philadelphia Phillies (1958)

Donald Lee Erickson (December 13, 1931 – August 1, 2012) was an American professional baseball pitcher who appeared in nine games Major League Baseball (MLB) as a relief pitcher for the Philadelphia Phillies in September of 1958. Erickson was a native of Springfield, Illinois, and served his country with the United States Army, during the Korean War. He threw and batted right-handed and was listed as 6 feet (1.8 m) tall and 170 pounds (77 kg).

Erickson signed with the Phillies in 1951, and missed the 1952 and 1953 seasons while performing military service. Returning to the minor leagues in 1954, he spent most of the 1955 through 1957 seasons with the Class A Schenectady Blue Jays. In 1958, a strong season in the Double-A Texas League earned him a promotion to Philadelphia in September, when big-league rosters grew from 25 to 40 players. In his nine relief appearances, Erickson hurled 112/3 innings, allowing six earned runs on 11 hits and nine bases on balls, striking out nine. His lone decision, a loss, came on September 16 against the Chicago Cubs, and he was credited with his only save on September 10 against the Los Angeles Dodgers.

Erickson returned to the minors in 1959 and pitched in the Phillies' organization through 1962, his tenth and final professional season. He died in Springfield on August 1, 2012. A nephew, Roger Erickson, also a right-handed pitcher, had a six-year career in the American League (1978–1983), mostly with the Minnesota Twins.
