= Marcelino Solis =

Mexican baseball player (1930–2001)

- Pitcher
- Born: July 19, 1930; Real de Catorce, San Luis Potosí, Mexico
- Died: June 15, 2001 (aged 70); Monterrey, Nuevo León, Mexico
- Batted: Left Threw: Left

MLB debut
- July 16, 1958, for the Chicago Cubs

Last MLB appearance
- September 13, 1958, for the Chicago Cubs

MLB statistics
- Win–loss record: 3–3
- Earned run average: 6.06
- Inning pitched: 52
- Stats at Baseball Reference

Teams
- Chicago Cubs (1958)

Marcelino Solis (July 19, 1930 – June 15, 2001) was a Mexican professional baseball player, a left-handed pitcher who appeared in 15 Major League games in 1958 for the Chicago Cubs. The native of Real de Catorce, San Luis Potosí, stood 6 feet 1 inch (1.85 m) tall and weighed 185 pounds (84 kg).

Solis' professional career extended from 1952 through 1963, but the 1958 campaign was his most noteworthy. Starting the year with the Fort Worth Cats, Solis fashioned a 15–2 won–lost record and a 2.44 earned run average in the Double-A Texas League then was called up to the Cubs in July. In his MLB debut on July 16 at Wrigley Field, Solis gave up nine hits and five runs, all earned, in 6 1/3 innings against the Cincinnati Redlegs, but gained a no-decision as the Cubs came back to win the game, 7–5. Solis would make three other starting pitcher assignments, but his finest outings came in relief. On July 26, he relieved starter Dick Drott in the third inning and then worked 6 1/3 scoreless frames to earn his first MLB victory over the Milwaukee Braves, the defending world champions. Then, on August 10, Solis turned in another lengthy relief effort, replacing John Briggs in the first inning in a game against the St. Louis Cardinals and lasting the final 8 2/3 innings while giving up only two earned runs to gain another victory. He was aided by four double plays in that contest.

In 52 Major League innings pitched, Solis surrendered 74 hits and 20 bases on balls; he struck out 15. He resumed his minor league career in 1959.
