= Lee Tate =

American baseball player (born 1932)

- Shortstop
- Born: March 18, 1932 (age 94); Black Rock, Arkansas, U.S.
- Batted: Right Threw: Right

MLB debut
- September 12, 1958, for the St. Louis Cardinals

Last MLB appearance
- July 3, 1959, for the St. Louis Cardinals

MLB statistics
- Batting average: .165
- Home runs: 1
- Runs batted in: 5
- Stats at Baseball Reference

Teams
- St. Louis Cardinals (1958–1959)

Lee Willie Tate (born March 18, 1932) is an American former professional baseball player. The shortstop had a 15-year (1951–1965) career in minor league baseball, appearing briefly in the Major Leagues for parts of the 1958 and 1959 seasons for the St. Louis Cardinals. Tate was born in Black Rock, Arkansas; he stood 5 feet 10 inches (1.78 m) tall, weighed 165 pounds (75 kg) and batted and threw right-handed.

Tate played in 51 games for the Cardinals: ten (eight as a starting shortstop) at the end of the 1958 season, and 41 during the first three months of the 1959 campaign. He started 12 games in relief of regular shortstop Alex Grammas between May 23 and June 6, 1959, and collected half of his 14 Major League hits over that time, including his only Major League home run, off Johnny Antonelli of the San Francisco Giants on May 27. Overall, he batted .165 (14 for 85) in the Major Leagues, with three doubles and one triple his other extra-base hits.

As a minor leaguer, he appeared in over 1,600 games.
