= Harry Hanebrink =

American baseball player (1927-1996)

- Second baseman/Left fielder
- Born: November 12, 1927; Saint Louis, Missouri, U.S.
- Died: September 9, 1996 (aged 68); Bridgeton, Missouri, U.S.
- Batted: Left Threw: Right

MLB debut
- May 3, 1953, for the Milwaukee Braves

Last MLB appearance
- September 27, 1959, for the Philadelphia Phillies

MLB statistics
- Batting average: .224
- Runs scored: 32
- Home runs: 6
- Runs batted in: 25
- Games played: 177
- Stats at Baseball Reference

Teams
- Milwaukee Braves (1953, 1957–1958); Philadelphia Phillies (1959)

Harry Aloysius Hanebrink (November 12, 1927 – September 9, 1996) was an American professional baseball backup second baseman/left fielder, who played in Major League Baseball (MLB) for the Milwaukee Braves (1953, 1957–1958) and Philadelphia Phillies (1959). Listed at 6 ft 0 in (1.83 m), 165 lb., Hanebrink batted left-handed and threw right-handed.

== Career ==
In a four-season big league career, Hanebrink was a .224 hitter (71-for-317), with six home runs, and 25 runs batted in (RBI), in 177 games, including seven doubles, two triples, and one stolen base.

Hanebrink made his MLB debut on May 3, 1953. He was a member of the Braves team that lost the 1958 World Series to the New York Yankees.

== After baseball ==
Hanebrink, a native of St. Louis, Missouri, was a United States Navy World War II veteran. He was a real estate broker for about 20 years with Dolan Realtors in St. Louis and a shuttle bus driver for QuickPark at Lambert Field, from 1992 until his death. On September 9, 1996, Hanebrink died in Bridgeton, Missouri, at the age of 68 from an aneurysm.
