= Dave Hillman =

American baseball player (1927–2022)

- Pitcher
- Born: September 14, 1927; Dungannon, Virginia, U.S.
- Died: November 20, 2022 (aged 95); Kingsport, Tennessee, U.S.
- Batted: Right Threw: Right

MLB debut
- April 30, 1955, for the Chicago Cubs

Last MLB appearance
- June 22, 1962, for the New York Mets

MLB statistics
- Win–loss record: 21–37
- Earned run average: 3.87
- Strikeouts: 296
- Stats at Baseball Reference

Teams
- Chicago Cubs (1955–1959); Boston Red Sox (1960–1961); Cincinnati Reds (1962); New York Mets (1962)

Darius Dutton Hillman (September 14, 1927 – November 20, 2022) was an American professional baseball player. A pitcher, he played in Major League Baseball between the 1955 and 1962 seasons. Listed at 5 feet 11 inches (1.80 m) and 168 pounds (76 kg), he batted and threw right-handed. At the time of his death, he was the oldest surviving former Cincinnati Reds player and he was the oldest living member of the 1962 New York Mets.

== Pro baseball career ==
Hillman entered the majors in 1955 with the Chicago Cubs, playing for them five years before joining the Boston Red Sox (1960–61), Cincinnati Reds (1962) and New York Mets (1962). In 1956 he had a 21–7 record with a 3.38 earned run average while playing most of the season for the PCL Los Angeles Angels. On September 14, 1957, in the second game of a double-header against the Pittsburgh Pirates, Hillman pitched to Cub catcher Jim Fanning, playing on their shared 30th birthdays.

In 1959 with the Cubs, he posted career-numbers in appearances (39), wins (8), starts (24), complete games (4), strikeouts (88), and innings pitched (191). On May 6, 1959, at Forbes Field, he threw his only big-league shutout against Harvey Haddix and the Pittsburgh Pirates, 3–0, giving up two hits, walking one and striking out two. Strictly a reliever for the 1961 Red Sox, he went 3–2 with a 2.77 ERA in 78 innings and 28 games.

In an eight-season career, Hillman posted a 21–37 record with 296 strikeouts and a 3.87 ERA in 188 games pitched, including 64 starts, eight complete games, one shutout, 42 games finished, three saves, 185 walks, and 624 innings pitched. Along with his Cubs teammate Jim Marshall, Hillman was part of the first inter-league trade without waivers in MLB history, when he went to the Boston Red Sox in return for Dick Gernert. The November 21, 1959, transaction was the first during a three-week period of unrestricted trading permitted by a change in both leagues' rules.

== Personal life and death ==
Hillman retired after many years of working in a clothing store and lived in Kingsport, Tennessee. He died on November 20, 2022, at the age of 95.
