= Seth Morehead =

American baseball player (1934–2006)

- 1960 Leaf baseball card
- Pitcher
- Born: August 15, 1934; Houston, Texas, U.S.
- Died: January 17, 2006 (aged 71); Shreveport, Louisiana, U.S.
- Batted: Left Threw: Left

MLB debut
- April 27, 1957, for the Philadelphia Phillies

Last MLB appearance
- September 15, 1961, for the Milwaukee Braves

MLB statistics
- Win–loss record: 5–19
- Earned run average: 4.81
- Strikeouts: 184
- Stats at Baseball Reference

Teams
- Philadelphia Phillies (1957–1959); Chicago Cubs (1959–1960); Milwaukee Braves (1961)

Seth Marvin "Moe" Morehead (August 15, 1934 – January 17, 2006) was a left-handed specialist reliever in Major League Baseball. He was born in Houston, Texas.

Morehead was signed by the Philadelphia Phillies as an amateur free agent in 1952 out of C. E. Byrd High School in Shreveport, LA. He spent five seasons in the major leagues pitching in parts of three seasons with the Phillies (1957–59), two seasons with the Chicago Cubs (1959–60) and one season with the Milwaukee Braves (1961).

Morehead posted a 5–19 record with a 4.81 ERA and five saves in 132 games pitched (24 as a starter). Among his career highlights was being the last pitcher to face Roy Campanella and also the last pitcher to face the Brooklyn Dodgers before the team moved to Los Angeles after the 1957 season.

Following his baseball career, Morehead graduated from Baylor University with a degree in business. He worked in banking for 36 years before retiring in 1999.

Morehead died in Shreveport, Louisiana, at the age of 71.
