= Gordon Jones (baseball) =

American baseball player (1930–1994)

- Pitcher
- Born: April 2, 1930; Portland, Oregon, U.S.
- Died: April 25, 1994 (aged 64); Lodi, California, U.S.
- Batted: Right Threw: Right

MLB debut
- August 6, 1954, for the St. Louis Cardinals

Last MLB appearance
- September 11, 1965, for the Houston Astros

MLB statistics
- Win–loss record: 15–18
- Earned run average: 4.14
- Strikeouts: 232
- Stats at Baseball Reference

Teams
- St. Louis Cardinals (1954–1956); New York / San Francisco Giants (1957–1959); Baltimore Orioles (1960–1961); Kansas City Athletics (1962); Houston Colt .45s / Astros (1964–1965)

Gordon Bassett Jones (April 2, 1930 – April 25, 1994) was an American Major League Baseball pitcher. The 6 feet (1.83 m), 190 pounds (86 kg) right-hander was a native of Portland, Oregon. He was signed by the St. Louis Cardinals as an amateur free agent before the 1949 season, and played for the Cardinals (1954–56), New York / San Francisco Giants (1957–59), Baltimore Orioles (1960–61), Kansas City Athletics (1962), Houston Colt .45s / Astros (1964–65).

== Playing career ==
Jones made his major league debut on August 6, 1954, starting game one of a doubleheader against the Pittsburgh Pirates at Forbes Field. The Cardinals lost by a score of 7–3. His rookie year of 1954 turned out to be his most successful season, as he was 4–4 with an earned run average of 2.00. Jones pitched two shutouts (August 25 against the Pirates and September 18 against the Milwaukee Braves) and allowed 18 earned runs in 81 innings.

In 1955 he started in 9 of his 15 appearances for St. Louis, but with much less success. His record was 1–4 with a 5.84 ERA. After that season, he pitched almost exclusively in relief. His best season after 1954 was for the original San Francisco Giants of 1958, going 3–1 with a 2.37 ERA in 11 games.

Career totals for 171 games include a record of 15–18, 21 games started, 4 complete games, 2 shutouts, 63 games finished, 12 saves, and an earned run average of 4.16. He had exceptional control during his MLB career, with a strikeout to walk ratio of almost 2-to-1, exceptional for his era. He walked only 120 batters in 378.2 innings for a BB/9IP of 2.85.

Jones handled 72 of 74 chances successfully for a fielding percentage of .973, and participating in 4 double plays. He made no errors during his last six major league seasons (119 games).

== Coaching career ==
After his playing career, Jones served for 1 1/2 seasons as the Major League pitching coach of the Astros—the full 1966 season and the first three months of the 1967 campaign. He was fired on July 8, 1967, by manager Grady Hatton after a rift developed between Jones and some members of his pitching staff. Veteran relief pitcher Jim Owens took Jones' place and remained the Astros' mound tutor through 1972.

Preceded by Howie Pollet	Houston Astros pitching coach 1966–1967	Succeeded by Jim Owens
