= Ray Semproch =

American baseball player (1931–2024)

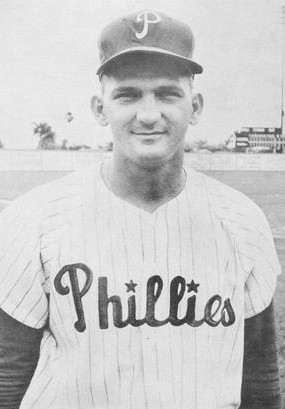
- Semproch in 1959
- Pitcher
- Born: January 7, 1931; Cleveland, Ohio, U.S.
- Died: October 27, 2024 (aged 93); Cleveland, Ohio, U.S.
- Batted: Right Threw: Right

MLB debut
- April 15, 1958, for the Philadelphia Phillies

Last MLB appearance
- May 2, 1961, for the Los Angeles Angels

MLB statistics
- Win–loss record: 19–21
- Earned run average: 4.42
- Strikeouts: 156
- Stats at Baseball Reference

Teams
- Philadelphia Phillies (1958–1959); Detroit Tigers (1960); Los Angeles Angels (1961)

Roman Anthony Semproch (January 7, 1931 – October 27, 2024), also known as Baby and Ray, was an American right-handed Major League Baseball pitcher who played from 1958 to 1961 for the Philadelphia Phillies, Detroit Tigers and Los Angeles Angels.

== Biography ==
Semproch was signed by the Phillies as an amateur free agent in 1951, but he did not make his big league debut until many years later – on April 15, 1958, against the Cincinnati Reds. The year prior, he had gone 12–4 with a 2.64 ERA for the Triple-A Miami Marlins. In his first major league game, he gave up a hit and a walk, struck out two, and earned the win in a three inning relief appearance. Overall, he went 13–11 with a 3.92 ERA in 36 big league games (30 starts) that season. Although he was leading the league in wins at mid-season, his success tapered off and he finished with a winning percentage slightly higher than .500.

Asthmatic, Semproch never lived up to his rookie season's success. In 1959, he went only 3–10 with a 5.40 ERA in 30 games (18 starts). He was traded to the Tigers on December 5, 1959 with Chico Fernandez for Ken Walters, Ted Lepcio, and minor leaguer Alex Cosmidis. In 17 relief appearances for the Tigers in 1960, he had an ERA of 4.00 and a record of 3–0. Despite that moderate success, he was traded on June 15, 1960 to the Los Angeles Dodgers with cash for Clem Labine. He would never play in a Dodgers uniform.

On November 28, 1960, he was drafted by the Washington Senators in the Rule 5 draft (he and John Gabler were the first two players acquired by the "new" Washington Senators of 1961). On April 7, 1961, the Angels purchased him from the Senators. He would appear in only two games for the Angels, posting a 9.00 ERA. He played his final major league game on May 2, 1961.

Overall, Semproch went 19–21 with a 4.42 ERA in 85 games (48 starts). In 344 innings, he walked 136 batters and struck out 156. He hit .116 at the plate and had a .965 fielding percentage.

Following his big league career, he worked as a bar manager at his brother's Italian restaurant. He died on October 27, 2024, at the age of 93.
