= Jim King (baseball) =

American baseball player (1932–2015)

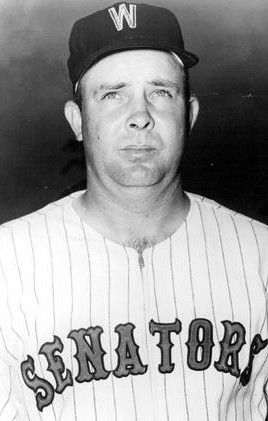
- King with the Senators in 1961
- Right fielder
- Born: August 27, 1932; Elkins, Arkansas, U.S.
- Died: February 23, 2015 (aged 82); Elkins, Arkansas, U.S.
- Batted: Left Threw: Right

MLB debut
- April 17, 1955, for the Chicago Cubs

Last MLB appearance
- September 24, 1967, for the Cleveland Indians

MLB statistics
- Batting average: .240
- Home runs: 117
- Runs batted in: 401
- Stats at Baseball Reference

Teams
- Chicago Cubs (1955–1956); St. Louis Cardinals (1957); San Francisco Giants (1958); Washington Senators (1961–1967); Chicago White Sox (1967); Cleveland Indians (1967)

James Hubert King (August 27, 1932 – February 23, 2015) was an American professional baseball outfielder. He played in Major League Baseball (MLB) for 11 seasons between 1955 and 1967, mostly with the Washington Senators. He also was a member of the Chicago Cubs, St. Louis Cardinals, San Francisco Giants, Chicago White Sox and Cleveland Indians. He batted left-handed, threw right-handed, and was listed as 6 feet (1.8 m) tall and 185 pounds (84 kg).

== Career ==
King began his professional career in 1950 in the Cardinals' farm system, from which he was drafted by the Cubs as a Rule 5 selection in 1954. After spending 1955 and 1956 on the Cubs' big-league roster, he was traded back to the Cardinals (1957) and then dealt to the Giants (1958), but spent most of the next four seasons in the minor leagues, getting into only 56 total MLB games between 1957 and 1960. In the latter year, he was named the International League Most Valuable Player. That December, King was taken by the brand-new, replacement Washington franchise with the 50th overall selection in the 1960 Major League Baseball expansion draft.

During his major league career, King played in 1,125 games (796 as a Senator), batting .240 with 699 hits, 112 doubles, 19 triples, 117 home runs and 401 runs batted in. Notable games during his career include;

- On April 15, 1958, King played in the first major league game ever contested in California, as a member of the Giants against the Los Angeles Dodgers.
- On May 26, 1964, King hit for the cycle, playing for the Senators against the Boston Red Sox.
- On June 8, 1964, King had a three home run game, playing for the Senators against the Kansas City Athletics.

== Personal life ==
King was born in Elkins, Arkansas. After his retirement from baseball, he returned to Arkansas and worked for a telephone company. He died in Elkins at the age of 82..

== See also ==
- List of Major League Baseball players to hit for the cycle

Achievements
Preceded by Jim Hickman	Hitting for the cycle May 26, 1964	Succeeded by Ken Boyer
