= Phil Paine =

American baseball player (1930–1978)

- Pitcher
- Born: June 8, 1930; Chepachet, Rhode Island, U.S.
- Died: February 19, 1978 (aged 47); Lebanon, Pennsylvania, U.S.
- Batted: Right Threw: Right

MLB debut
- July 14, 1951, for the Boston Braves

Last MLB appearance
- September 19, 1958, for the St. Louis Cardinals

MLB statistics
- Win–loss record: 10–1
- Earned run average: 3.36
- Strikeouts: 101

NPB statistics
- Win–loss record: 4–3
- Earned run average: 1.77
- Strikeouts: 38
- Stats at Baseball Reference

Teams
- Boston Braves (1951); Nishitetsu Lions (1953); Milwaukee Braves (1954–1957); St. Louis Cardinals (1958)

Phillips Steere Paine (June 8, 1930 – February 19, 1978) was an American Major League Baseball relief pitcher who appeared in all or part of six MLB seasons between 1951 and 1958. In 1953, while serving in the military, Paine pitched in nine games for the Nishitetsu Lions, becoming the first major leaguer to play in Nippon Professional Baseball. He threw and batted right-handed, and was listed as 6 feet 2 inches (1.88 m) tall and 180 pounds (82 kg).

Paine was born in Chepachet, Rhode Island. At nearby Burrillville High School, he bested Chet Nichols Jr., of Pawtucket East, to win the 1948 Rhode Island State Championship, and upon graduation signed with the Philadelphia Phillies. After two years in the Phillies' farm system, he was drafted by the Boston Braves.

== Career in Japan and MLB ==
Recalled by Boston from the Class A Hartford Chiefs in the middle of the 1951, he worked in 21 games out of the bullpen. As a rookie, Paine won his only two decisions; he allowed 36 hits and 20 bases on balls in 351/3 innings pitched, but only 12 earned runs, for an ERA of 3.06.

He then entered the United States Army for military service during the Korean War. When his unit was sent to Japan, Paine was allowed to pitch for the Nishitetsu Lions, making his NPB debut on August 23, 1953. Unlike in the major leagues, Paine was a starting pitcher for the Lions, making eight starts among his nine appearances, and posting five complete games and one shutout. Overall, his NPB record was 4–3, with a 1.77 earned run average in 61 innings pitched.

In 1954, Paine rejoined the Braves — now in Milwaukee — upon completion of his military service. He would continue his winning skein in a Brave uniform by posting a 3–0 record through 1957. But his inconsistent performance resulted in assignments to the minor leagues for parts of four consecutive seasons. Finally, in April of 1958, he was claimed off waivers by the St. Louis Cardinals. The 1958 campaign was Paine's only full year in the major leagues. He worked in a career-high 46 games, and won another four consecutive decisions (to go 9–0 for his career) before losing his first MLB game on July 29 against his original organization, the Phillies. As late as August 9, his earned run average was below the 2.00 mark. But two ineffective appearances over the season's final two months inflated Paine's ERA to 3.56. He was traded to the Los Angeles Dodgers during the off-season, played at the Triple-A level for three years, and never returned to the majors.

All told, in 95 MLB career games pitched, all in relief, Paine posted a 10–1 win–loss record (for a winning percentage of .909) with one save. In 150 total innings pitched he surrendered 144 hits and 80 bases on balls, with 101 strikeouts.

== Personal life ==
Paine married Jeannette Orsini of Hummelstown, Pennsylvania, after meeting her while he was posted nearby during his U.S. Army basic training. They settled in Hummelstown to raise their family, with Paine helping to operate his in-laws' hotel and restaurant. On February 19, 1978, at age 47, he died from a brain tumor at the Veterans Hospital near Lebanon, Pennsylvania, and was survived by his wife and three children.

== See also ==
- American expatriate baseball players in Japan
