= Billy Muffett =

American baseball player (1930–2008)

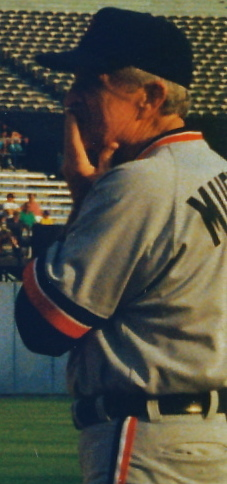
- Muffett with the Detroit Tigers in 1992
- Pitcher
- Born: September 21, 1930; Hammond, Indiana, U.S.
- Died: June 15, 2008 (aged 77); Monroe, Louisiana, U.S.
- Batted: Right Threw: Right

MLB debut
- August 3, 1957, for the St. Louis Cardinals

Last MLB appearance
- April 28, 1962, for the Boston Red Sox

MLB statistics
- Win–loss record: 16–23
- Earned run average: 4.33
- Strikeouts: 188
- Stats at Baseball Reference

Teams
- St. Louis Cardinals (1957–1958); San Francisco Giants (1959); Boston Red Sox (1960–1962)

Career highlights and awards
- World Series champion (1967)

Billy Arnold Muffett (September 21, 1930 – June 15, 2008) was an American professional baseball player and coach. He pitched in the Major Leagues for all or parts of six seasons (1957–1962) for the St. Louis Cardinals, San Francisco Giants and Boston Red Sox. In his playing days, he stood 6 feet 1 inch (1.85 m) tall, weighed 198 pounds (90 kg), and threw and batted right-handed. He was born in Hammond, Indiana.

Beginning his professional career in 1949, Muffett missed the 1952 and 1953 seasons due to military service. He returned to minor league baseball in 1954.

Muffett came to the major leagues with St. Louis in 1957 and fashioned his best overall season, winning three of five decisions, posting an earned run average of 2.25 and notching eight saves. Over his career, he won 16 and lost 23 (.410) with a 4.33 ERA in 125 games. He threw seven complete games and one shutout and was credited with 15 career saves.

After retiring as a player, Muffett was a longtime MLB pitching coach for the Cardinals, California Angels and Detroit Tigers between 1967 and 1994, as well a minor league instructor. He coached on the Cardinals' 1967–68 National League pennant-winning clubs, and their 1967 World Series champion edition. He survived a bout with cancer in 1987, but continued in his role as Tiger pitching coach during his recovery.

Billy Muffett died June 15, 2008, at his home in Monroe, Louisiana.

== See also ==
- List of St. Louis Cardinals coaches

Preceded by Joe Becker	St. Louis Cardinals pitching coach 1967–1970	Succeeded by Barney Schultz
Preceded by Tom Morgan	California Angels pitching coach 1974–1977	Succeeded by Marv Grissom
Preceded by Roger Craig	Detroit Tigers pitching coach 1985–1994	Succeeded by Ralph Treuel
