= Jim Brosnan =

American baseball player (1929–2014)

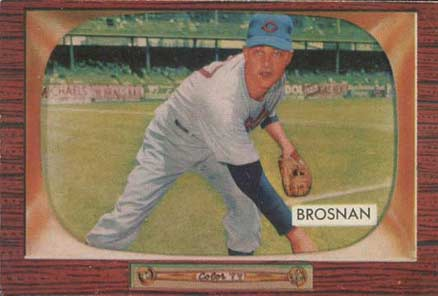
- Pitcher
- Born: October 24, 1929; Cincinnati, Ohio, U.S.
- Died: June 28, 2014 (aged 84); Morton Grove, Illinois, U.S.
- Batted: Right Threw: Right

MLB debut
- April 15, 1954, for the Chicago Cubs

Last MLB appearance
- September 21, 1963, for the Chicago White Sox

MLB statistics
- Win–loss record: 55–47
- Earned run average: 3.54
- Strikeouts: 507
- Saves: 68
- Stats at Baseball Reference

Teams
- Chicago Cubs (1954–1958); St. Louis Cardinals (1958–1959); Cincinnati Reds (1959–1963); Chicago White Sox (1963)

James Patrick Brosnan (October 24, 1929 – June 28, 2014) was an American professional baseball player and author who played in Major League Baseball in 1954 and from 1956 through 1963. A right-handed pitcher, he appeared in 385 games, largely in relief, for the Chicago Cubs, St. Louis Cardinals, Cincinnati Reds and Chicago White Sox. Brosnan was listed as 6 feet 4 inches (1.93 m) tall and 197 pounds (89 kg).

During his career, Brosnan was known as an intellectual, for keeping books in his locker to read and for his personal habits of puffing on a pipe while wearing his glasses, reading books during games. His teammates often referred to him as "The Professor". He attended Xavier University.

== Early life ==
Brosnan was born on October 24, 1929, in Cincinnati. His father worked as a lathe operator for a milling company. His mother encouraged the pursuit of education and the arts and Brosnan spent little time engaged in athletics. He graduated from Elder High School, located in the Price Hill neighborhood of Cincinnati. Eventually, his height led him to sports and he played for the local American Legion baseball team. By the age of 17 Brosnan had joined the Chicago Cubs minor league baseball organization. His time there was interrupted by a two-year enlistment in the Army where he pitched for the military baseball team on Fort Meade, Maryland. After his enlistment was over, Brosnan returned to the Cubs organization.

== Baseball career ==
In 1954, the Cubs brought Brosnan to the major leagues, where he pitched poorly. As a result, he was returned to the Cubs' minor league affiliate in Los Angeles where he won 17 games and had a 2.38 ERA. In 1956, the Cubs brought him back to the major leagues, where he stayed until his retirement. Brosnan pitched with mixed success in Chicago, where his record was 14−18 before he was traded to St Louis Cardinals and then to the Cincinnati Reds, for whom he enjoyed success as a relief pitcher. Relying on a good fastball and slider, Brosnan enjoyed a career best season with the Reds in 1960, when he compiled an 8–3 record and a 2.36 ERA. In 1961, the Reds won the National League pennant and played the New York Yankees in the World Series, Brosnan's only post-season appearance. The Reds, facing a formidable Yankees team led by Mickey Mantle and Roger Maris, lost in five games. Brosnan was traded to the Chicago White Sox in 1963, where he finished his career. By then, he had published his first book, The Long Season, which led to considerable controversy, and the White Sox, not wanting any more distractions, wrote a clause in his contract forbidding him to write any more books. Brosnan declined the contract and retired from baseball instead.

== Author ==
While known as a moderately effective pitcher, both as a starter and a reliever, Brosnan gained greater fame by becoming one of the first athletes to publish a candid personal diary. Up to that time, such books were "sanitized" for the general public and used ghostwriters. Instead, Brosnan's self-penned book, The Long Season, a season which found him being traded from St. Louis to Cincinnati at approximately the halfway point of the 1959 baseball season, touched on the subjects of racial awareness, boredom, fatigue, and skirt-chasing by players, as well as the never-ending stress of trying to maintain a position on the big league roster.

Two years later, Brosnan again kept a diary, a fortuitous circumstance as the Reds would win the National League championship in 1961, before falling to the New York Yankees in the World Series. Brosnan's book was published under the appropriate title Pennant Race.

Brosnan's books garnered both praise and criticism. Pulitzer-prize winning columnist Red Smith praised The Long Season as "...caustic and candid, and, in a way, courageous." Others, such as Joe Garagiola, famously called Brosnan a "kooky beatnik."

Writing in the Chicago Tribune in July 1960, then-White Sox president Bill Veeck acknowledged that The Long Season was "delightful", but that "Brosnan has his say about many who may have, in times past, had their say about him. This just doesn't seem to come off so well, and tends to lessen the impact and enjoyment of his undeniably colorful material".

== Post career ==
After his playing days, Brosnan continued writing and also became a sportscaster. He worked for several years as a sports anchor in the Chicago area and delivered sportscasts for the Chicago-area radio station WFYR. Brosnan also wrote for a broad range of publications, including Boys' Life, Sport, Sports Illustrated, Playboy, Esquire and the Chicago Tribune Magazine. Brosnan's subjects extended far beyond baseball. In a December 1966 article in the Tribune magazine titled "Lo, the Impudent Bird!" Brosnan wrote a story about his resistance to hunting, a sport enjoyed by many of his friends.

Brosnan also wrote books for boys, including Little League to Big League, Great Baseball Pitchers and Great Rookies of the Major Leagues.

During the June 13, 1966 episode of To Tell The Truth, Brosnan appeared as himself; none of the panelists correctly picked him as the contestant.

== Death and legacy ==
Brosnan died at the age of 84 while in hospice in Park Ridge, Illinois. At the time of his death he was recovering from a stroke when sepsis set in. His survivors include three children, Jamie Kruidenier of Champaign, Illinois, Tim Brosnan of Morton Grove, Illinois, and Kimberly Brosnan-Myers, of Philadelphia, as well as a brother and four grandchildren.

Brosnan's first book, The Long Season, was named by Sports Illustrated as the 19th best sports book of all time and credited the work as serving as a model for Jim Bouton's book Ball Four, Jerry Kramer's book Instant Replay, and many other first-person sports memoirs.

"The Long Season not merely changed everything, it remains, decades later, the best of its kind." -- Washington Post book critic Jonathan Yardley

Brosnan was inducted into the Baseball Reliquary's Shrine of the Eternals in 2007.
