= 1963 Baltimore Orioles season =

Major League Baseball season

1963 Baltimore Orioles
- League: American League
- Ballpark: Memorial Stadium
- City: Baltimore, Maryland
- Record: 86–76 (.531)
- League place: 4th
- Owners: Jerold Hoffberger, Joseph Iglehart
- General managers: Lee MacPhail
- Managers: Billy Hitchcock
- Television: WBAL-TV
- Radio: WBAL (AM) (Chuck Thompson, Joe Croghan)

The 1963 Baltimore Orioles season involved the Orioles finishing fourth in the American League with a record of 86 wins and 76 losses.

== Offseason ==
- November 21, 1962: Jimmie Coker purchased by the Orioles from the Philadelphia Phillies.
- November 26, 1962: Paul Blair was drafted by the Orioles from the New York Mets in the 1962 first-year draft.
- November 26, 1962: Curt Motton was drafted by the Orioles from the Chicago Cubs in the 1962 minor league draft.
- November 26, 1962: Gus Triandos and Whitey Herzog were traded by the Orioles to the Detroit Tigers for Dick Brown.
- December 15, 1962: Jack Fisher, Jimmie Coker and Billy Hoeft were traded by the Orioles to the San Francisco Giants for Stu Miller, Mike McCormick, and John Orsino.
- January 14, 1963: Hoyt Wilhelm, Ron Hansen, Dave Nicholson, and Pete Ward were traded by the Orioles to the Chicago White Sox for Luis Aparicio and Al Smith.
- Prior to 1963 season: Ron Stone was signed as an amateur free agent by the Orioles.

== Regular season ==
=== Season standings ===
American League
| Team | W | L | Pct. | GB | Home | Road |
|---|---|---|---|---|---|---|
| New York Yankees | 104 | 57 | .646 | — | 58‍–‍22 | 46‍–‍35 |
| Chicago White Sox | 94 | 68 | .580 | 10½ | 49‍–‍33 | 45‍–‍35 |
| Minnesota Twins | 91 | 70 | .565 | 13 | 48‍–‍33 | 43‍–‍37 |
| Baltimore Orioles | 86 | 76 | .531 | 18½ | 48‍–‍33 | 38‍–‍43 |
| Cleveland Indians | 79 | 83 | .488 | 25½ | 41‍–‍40 | 38‍–‍43 |
| Detroit Tigers | 79 | 83 | .488 | 25½ | 47‍–‍34 | 32‍–‍49 |
| Boston Red Sox | 76 | 85 | .472 | 28 | 44‍–‍36 | 32‍–‍49 |
| Kansas City Athletics | 73 | 89 | .451 | 31½ | 36‍–‍45 | 37‍–‍44 |
| Los Angeles Angels | 70 | 91 | .435 | 34 | 39‍–‍42 | 31‍–‍49 |
| Washington Senators | 56 | 106 | .346 | 48½ | 31‍–‍49 | 25‍–‍57 |

=== Record vs. opponents ===
1963 American League record Sources:
| Team | BAL | BOS | CWS | CLE | DET | KCA | LAA | MIN | NYY | WAS |
|---|---|---|---|---|---|---|---|---|---|---|
| Baltimore | — | 7–11 | 7–11 | 10–8 | 13–5 | 9–9 | 9–9 | 9–9 | 7–11 | 15–3 |
| Boston | 11–7 | — | 8–10 | 10–8 | 9–9 | 7–11 | 9–8 | 7–11 | 6–12 | 9–9 |
| Chicago | 11–7 | 10–8 | — | 11–7 | 11–7 | 12–6 | 10–8 | 8–10 | 8–10 | 13–5 |
| Cleveland | 8–10 | 8–10 | 7–11 | — | 10–8 | 11–7 | 10–8 | 5–13 | 7–11 | 13–5 |
| Detroit | 5–13 | 9–9 | 7–11 | 8–10 | — | 13–5 | 12–6 | 8–10 | 8–10 | 9–9 |
| Kansas City | 9–9 | 11–7 | 6–12 | 7–11 | 5–13 | — | 10–8 | 9–9 | 6–12 | 10–8 |
| Los Angeles | 9–9 | 8–9 | 8–10 | 8–10 | 6–12 | 8–10 | — | 9–9 | 5–13 | 9–9 |
| Minnesota | 9–9 | 11–7 | 10–8 | 13–5 | 10–8 | 9–9 | 9–9 | — | 6–11 | 14–4 |
| New York | 11–7 | 12–6 | 10–8 | 11–7 | 10–8 | 12–6 | 13–5 | 11–6 | — | 14–4 |
| Washington | 3–15 | 9–9 | 5–13 | 5–13 | 9–9 | 8–10 | 9–9 | 4–14 | 4–14 | — |

=== Notable transactions ===
- April 29, 1963: Curt Blefary was selected off waivers by the Orioles from the New York Yankees as a first-year waiver pick.
- May 8, 1963: Hobie Landrith was purchased from the Orioles by the Washington Senators.
- May 15, 1963: Bobby Darwin was selected off waivers by the Orioles from the Los Angeles Angels as a first-year waiver pick.

=== Roster ===
1963 Baltimore Orioles
Roster
| Pitchers: 13 Steve Barber; 28 George Brunet; 27 Wally Bunker; 20 Pete Burnside; 14 Ike Delock; 23 Chuck Estrada; 29 Dick Hall; 40 Mike McCormick; 19 Dave McNally; 17 John Miller; 37 Stu Miller; 35 Buster Narum; 32 Milt Pappas; 38 Robin Roberts; 24 Herm Starrette; 18 Wes Stock; 22 Dean Stone | Catchers: 10 Dick Brown; 30 Hobie Landrith; 44 Charley Lau; 12 John Orsino; Infielders: 7 Jerry Adair; 11 Luis Aparicio; 4 Jim Gentile; 2 Bob Johnson; 5 Brooks Robinson; 1 Bob Saverine | Outfielders: 14 Sam Bowens; 25 Jackie Brandt; 6 Joe Gaines; 16,26 Boog Powell; 3,16 Al Smith; 9 Russ Snyder; 20 Fred Valentine | Manager: 45 Billy Hitchcock; Coaches: 41 Luke Appling; 42 Hank Bauer; 31 Harry Brecheen |

== Player stats ==
=== Batting ===
==== Starters by position ====
Note: Pos = Position; G = Games played; AB = At bats; H = Hits; Avg. = Batting average; HR = Home runs; RBI = Runs batted in

| Pos | Player | G | AB | H | Avg. | HR | RBI |
|---|---|---|---|---|---|---|---|
| C | John Orsino | 116 | 379 | 103 | .272 | 19 | 56 |
| 1B | Jim Gentile | 145 | 496 | 123 | .248 | 24 | 72 |
| 2B | Jerry Adair | 109 | 382 | 87 | .228 | 6 | 30 |
| 3B | Brooks Robinson | 161 | 589 | 148 | .251 | 11 | 67 |
| SS | Luis Aparicio | 146 | 601 | 150 | .250 | 5 | 45 |
| LF | Boog Powell | 140 | 491 | 130 | .265 | 25 | 82 |
| CF | Jackie Brandt | 142 | 451 | 112 | .248 | 15 | 61 |
| RF | Al Smith | 120 | 368 | 100 | .272 | 10 | 39 |

==== Other batters ====
Note: G = Games played; AB = At bats; H = Hits; Avg. = Batting average; HR = Home runs; RBI = Runs batted in

| Player | G | AB | H | Avg. | HR | RBI |
|---|---|---|---|---|---|---|
| Russ Snyder | 148 | 429 | 110 | .256 | 7 | 36 |
| Bob Johnson | 82 | 254 | 75 | .295 | 8 | 32 |
| Dick Brown | 59 | 171 | 42 | .246 | 2 | 13 |
| Bob Saverine | 115 | 167 | 39 | .234 | 1 | 12 |
| Joe Gaines | 66 | 126 | 36 | .286 | 6 | 20 |
| Sam Bowens | 15 | 48 | 16 | .333 | 1 | 9 |
| Charley Lau | 29 | 48 | 9 | .188 | 0 | 6 |
| Fred Valentine | 26 | 41 | 11 | .268 | 0 | 1 |
| Hobie Landrith | 2 | 1 | 0 | .000 | 0 | 0 |

=== Pitching ===
==== Starting pitchers ====
Note: G = Games pitched; IP = Innings pitched; W = Wins; L = Losses; ERA = Earned run average; SO = Strikeouts

| Player | G | IP | W | L | ERA | SO |
|---|---|---|---|---|---|---|
| Steve Barber | 39 | 258.2 | 20 | 13 | 2.75 | 180 |
| Robin Roberts | 35 | 251.1 | 14 | 13 | 3.33 | 124 |
| Milt Pappas | 34 | 216.2 | 16 | 9 | 3.03 | 120 |
| Mike McCormick | 25 | 136.0 | 6 | 8 | 4.30 | 75 |
| Dave McNally | 29 | 125.2 | 7 | 8 | 4.58 | 78 |
| Chuck Estrada | 8 | 31.1 | 3 | 2 | 4.60 | 16 |
| Ike Delock | 7 | 30.1 | 1 | 3 | 5.04 | 11 |
| Wally Bunker | 1 | 4.0 | 0 | 1 | 13.50 | 1 |

==== Other pitchers ====
Note: G = Games pitched; IP = Innings pitched; W = Wins; L = Losses; ERA = Earned run average; SO = Strikeouts

| Player | G | IP | W | L | ERA | SO |
|---|---|---|---|---|---|---|
| John Miller | 3 | 17.0 | 1 | 1 | 3.18 | 16 |

==== Relief pitchers ====
Note: G = Games pitched; W = Wins; L = Losses; SV = Saves; ERA = Earned run average; SO = Strikeouts

| Player | G | W | L | SV | ERA | SO |
|---|---|---|---|---|---|---|
| Stu Miller | 71 | 5 | 8 | 27 | 2.24 | 118 |
| Dick Hall | 47 | 5 | 5 | 12 | 2.98 | 74 |
| Wes Stock | 47 | 7 | 0 | 1 | 3.94 | 55 |
| Herm Starrette | 18 | 0 | 1 | 0 | 3.46 | 13 |
| George Brunet | 16 | 0 | 1 | 1 | 5.40 | 13 |
| Buster Narum | 7 | 0 | 0 | 0 | 3.00 | 5 |
| Pete Burnside | 6 | 0 | 1 | 0 | 4.91 | 6 |

== Awards and honors ==
All-Star Game

- Luis Aparicio, shortstop, starter
- Steve Barber, reserve
- Brooks Robinson, reserve

== Farm system ==
| Level | Team | League | Manager |
|---|---|---|---|
| AAA | Rochester Red Wings | International League | Darrell Johnson |
| AA | Elmira Pioneers | Eastern League | Earl Weaver |
| A | Stockton Ports | California League | Harry Dunlop |
| A | Fox Cities Foxes | Midwest League | Billy DeMars |
| A | Aberdeen Pheasants | Northern League | Cal Ripken Sr. |
| Rookie | Bluefield Orioles | Appalachian League | Billy Hunter |

LEAGUE CHAMPIONS: Stockton, Bluefield
