= Hobie Landrith =

American baseball player (1930–2023)

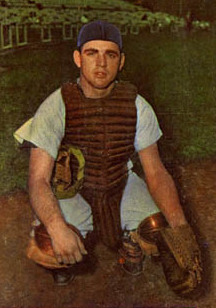
- Landrith in 1954
- Catcher
- Born: March 16, 1930; Decatur, Illinois, U.S.
- Died: April 6, 2023 (aged 93); Sunnyvale, California, U.S.
- Batted: Left Threw: Right

MLB debut
- July 30, 1950, for the Cincinnati Reds

Last MLB appearance
- August 7, 1963, for the Washington Senators

MLB statistics
- Batting average: .233
- Home runs: 34
- Runs batted in: 203
- Stats at Baseball Reference

Teams
- As player: Cincinnati Reds (1950–1955); Chicago Cubs (1956); St. Louis Cardinals (1957–1958); San Francisco Giants (1959–1961); New York Mets (1962); Baltimore Orioles (1962–1963); Washington Senators (1963); As coach: Washington Senators (1964)

Hobert Neal Landrith (March 16, 1930 – April 6, 2023) was an American professional baseball player. He played in Major League Baseball as a catcher from 1950 through 1963 for the Cincinnati Reds/Redlegs, Chicago Cubs, St. Louis Cardinals, San Francisco Giants, New York Mets, Baltimore Orioles, and Washington Senators. He batted left-handed, threw right-handed, stood 5 feet 10 inches (1.78 m) tall and weighed 170 pounds (77 kg).

For most of his career, Landrith was a second- or third-string catcher. He was a backup catcher for Andy Seminick and Smoky Burgess in Cincinnati, and later a regular with the Cubs in 1956. The following two years he backed up All-Stars Hal Smith and Walker Cooper with the Cardinals. He then had a three-season tenure in San Francisco, including his most successful season in 1959. He was the first pick of the New York Mets in the 1961 expansion draft. Landrith closed out his career with short stints with the Mets, Orioles, and expansion Senators. In a career that spanned 14 seasons, Landrith had a career .233 batting average with 34 home runs, 203 runs batted in, and 450 hits in 772 games played.

== Early life ==
Originally from Decatur, Illinois, Landrith from age 10 to 14 played for the "Firemen's Midgets" team in the Detroit Amateur Baseball Federation. From 15 to 18, he played with a Class D advanced simon-pure group and as a catcher for Northwestern High School in Detroit, Michigan. At 15, he went to Briggs Stadium and helped warmup starting pitchers for the Detroit Tigers and get Hank Greenberg into shape after he returned from military service. Landrith was discovered by the Cincinnati Reds after leading his Detroit team to a second-place finish in the 1948 National Junior Amateur Federation Tournament. That year he also participated in the annual East-West all-star game in New York City, being voted the city's most outstanding amateur player by the Detroit Sports Guild.

Landrith attended Michigan State University, where he played one season before turning professional.

== Playing career ==
=== Cincinnati Reds ===
On February 8, 1949, the Cincinnati Reds signed Landrith. This angered Spartans coach John Kobs, who was quoted as saying, "They ought to leave these young players alone and give them a chance to finish college." Reds general manager Warren Giles agreed with the coach's sentiment, but cited that he could not wait any longer to sign Landrith as eight other major league ball clubs were all interested in signing him. The Big Ten Conference made a brief effort to stop the "raid" of the conference of their star players, but nonetheless, the 18-year-old catcher out of Detroit agreed to a four-year contract with the Reds.

At the Reds spring training camp in late March, murmurs started to surface that he was the "hottest thing" in camp. Landrith was a star in the sandlots of Detroit and at Michigan State University. He desperately wanted to play professional baseball with the Detroit Tigers, crying when his father convinced him to sign with Cincinnati. The Tigers offered Landrith a two-year minor league deal worth $8,000. However, Cincinnati offered him a four-year major league contract at $6,000 per year, totaling $24,000. Landrith learned that the Tigers had paid a $75,000 bonus to catcher Frank House, so he thought the Tigers had too much money tied up in House that he would never be given much of a chance. Landrith played in spring training games for the Reds before being assigned to the minor league baseball Class A Charleston Senators of the Central League. He had a .250 batting average with 111 total bases in 110 games played.

In January 1950, Landrith signed a new deal with the Cincinnati Reds. On March 10, he was assigned to the Tulsa Oilers of the Class AA Texas League. In the opening game for Tulsa against the Dallas Eagles on April 11 at the Cotton Bowl, Landrith went 1-for-2 with a double before breaking his left ankle as he slid into home plate.

While Landrith was still recovering from his ankle injury, the Cincinnati Reds brought him up the Major Leagues and placed him on the disabled list. Landrith joined the Reds squad when they played an exhibition game in Detroit, his hometown, on June 12. He worked out with the team from there on out, traveling with the team on all road trips, catching in batting practice and pulling bullpen duty. On July 30, the top three catchers on the Reds' depth chart were all recovering from ailing injuries. Johnny Pramesa had a sprained ankle sustained the day before on July 29, Bob Scheffing was having problems with his left elbow, and Dixie Howell's throwing hand had been sore. Reds Manager Luke Sewell made the decision to finally give Landrith his first major league start that day at the Boston Braves, singling in his first at bat off Braves starter Vern Bickford and driving in a run. Landrith played in three more games through August 8 before he was no longer used in games and resumed his duty of working solely in practice roles.

Landrith signed his new contract to play with the Reds in late January 1951. He attended spring training with the Reds, but at the end of March became the first player cut from the roster, being optioned to the Buffalo Bisons of the Class AAA International League. Offensively, Hobie struggled at Buffalo, putting up a .191 average in 98 games. He suffered another injury in early August, but in mid-September he received another call-up to the majors for the Reds. Landrith again only played in four games, but collected one or more hits in each game, including three runs scored.

Landrith again joined the Reds in the Grapefruit League for spring training in 1952, and again was optioned to the minor leagues in late March for more seasoning. This time he was sent back to Class AA Tulsa of the Texas League. This time, however, Landrith had the best season of his short professional career yet, hitting for a .300 batting average with 114 hits in 118 games played. His batting average was good enough for 13th in the Texas League. On September 4, Landrith was rewarded for his great play by being called upon once more to join the Reds squad. This time, however, he was given many more opportunities to show what he was made of. Landrith started the majority of the Reds' final 17 games, hitting .260 with four RBIs over that span, including a four hit day against the Boston Braves on September 10 and a three hit day on the last game of the season against the Pittsburgh Pirates on September 28, both contributing to a Reds victory. Even though he played in only 16 games, Landrith was awarded the distinction of being one of only three catchers in the entire National League to not have been charged a passed ball.

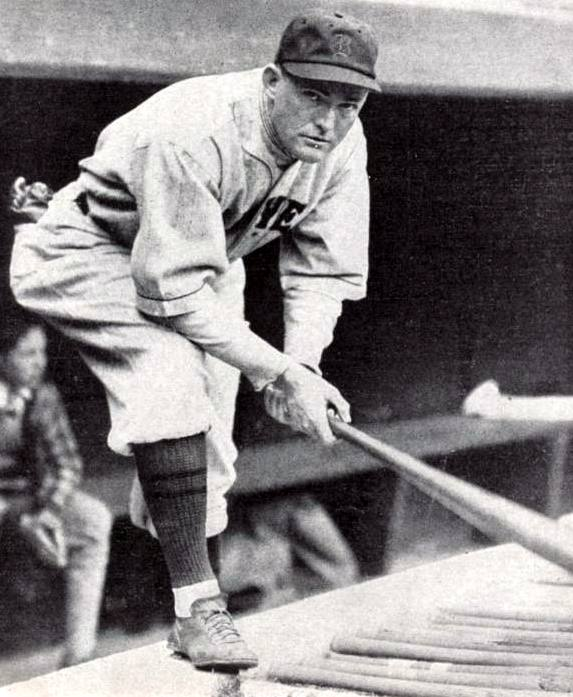
Cincinnati Redlegs manager Rogers Hornsby, who said that Landrith would be a key to the success of the 1953 club.

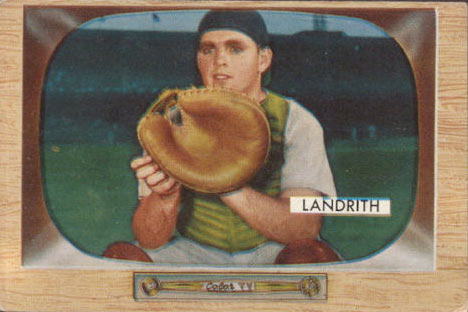
Landrith in his final season as Redlegs catcher in 1955

On January 25, 1953, Landrith signed his newest contract to play with Cincinnati for the upcoming season. Going into the season, manager Rogers Hornsby was optimistic that they would have a better club with more power overall, citing Landrith as one of the new players that could help the 1953 Reds be a success. Hornsby made it clear that veteran Andy Seminick would be the number one catcher on the depth chart for the Reds, but also said that Landrith would get a "good look" after witnessing his performance with the Reds at the end of the 1952 season, praising that he liked his "hustle". Landrith impressed during spring training, capping off the exhibition season with five RBIs against the Detroit Tigers with a three-run home run in a 10–9 winning effort on April 12. Although Seminick was the definite starting catcher for the Reds, Landrith was the opening day catcher on April 13. He did not play another game until April 29, when despite going 2-for-4 with two RBIs, he allowed a passed ball against the Brooklyn Dodgers with the bases loaded and two outs in the bottom of the ninth inning against hitter Duke Snider, scoring Carl Furillo from third base and losing the game 6–5.

Landrith soon emerged as the number two catcher on the depth chart behind Seminick, splitting many starts between the two from the end of May through July. In June and July, he started in 26 games to Seminick's 37. With the Reds' hopes of a successful season dying and Landrith struggling to keep his batting average above .220, the veteran Seminick, hitting .219, took over the vast majority of the Reds' catching duties from August 1 through the end of the season. Landrith ended the season with a .240 batting average to go with three home runs and 16 RBIs in 52 games. Although he never played in a Major League Baseball All-Star Game, Landrith was assigned the role of being the National League All-Stars' batting practice catcher for the 1953 All-Star Game by Dodgers manager Charlie Dressen.

At the height of anti-Communism sentiment in the United States, the Reds officially changed their name to the Cincinnati Redlegs to remove any potential "confusion" between the baseball team and Communists. Five catchers entered the 1954 Redlegs training camp in Tampa, with Landrith and Ed Bailey the early favorites to back up Seminick, but by the end of March, Landrith was fighting with Frank Baldwin to hold on to the number three spot on the catcher depth chart. By April 8, however, Baldwin was optioned to the minors, leaving Landrith in sole possession of the Reds' third and final catcher roster spot. Landrith had little offense that season, hitting .198 with five home runs and 14 RBIs in 48 games. He did, however, have one dramatic game-winning walk-off home run against the New York Giants' reliever Al Corwin in the bottom of the 12th inning on July 19 to give the Reds a 1–0 victory. Trade talks arose after the conclusion of the 1954 season. One potential deal had Landrith along with outfielder Wally Post going to the Brooklyn Dodgers for second baseman Junior Gilliam. The proposed deal was later amended to add Dodgers pitcher Bob Milliken and Reds hurler Fred Baczewski. The deal later fizzled out, with the Dodgers determined to keep Gilliam. Landrith participated in the Puerto Rican Winter Leagues after the 1954 season, hitting an average of .342. The mark was good enough for third in the league, just behind Willie Mays and Roberto Clemente.

Landrith started the 1955 season as backup for Bailey. On April 30, Seminick was traded to the Philadelphia Phillies for Smoky Burgess, who immediately became the Reds' starting catcher. Bailey was optioned to the San Diego Padres of the Pacific Coast League, leaving Landrith as the direct backup behind Burgess. Landrith had the only multi-home run game of his career on the second game of a doubleheader on May 8 against the Chicago Cubs, hitting a home run in the 6th inning and then a walk-off, game-winning home run in the bottom of the 9th, giving the Redlegs a 4–3 win. On June 27, Landrith broke his collarbone after being struck by a foul tip during an exhibition game. He would not return until August 23, almost two full months later. Landrith hit .253 with four home runs and seven RBIs in 43 games. He had the seventh-highest on-base plus slugging (OPS) percentage out of all NL catchers with a mark of .755.

=== Chicago Cubs ===
On November 28, 1955, Landrith was traded to the Chicago Cubs for centerfielder turned pitcher Hal Jeffcoat. Originally, the move sparked eight-year Cub veteran Jeffcoat to announce his retirement from baseball on November 29 and go into the insurance business. Hal later reconsidered, playing four more years of pro ball, but nonetheless, Landrith was now officially a Cub. He officially signed a contract to play with Chicago for the upcoming season on February 10, 1956.

Throughout spring training, Landrith competed with Harry Chiti for the starting role at catcher for the Cubs. Chiti carried the load behind the backstop for Chicago in 1955, playing in 113 games with 11 home runs and 41 RBI. By coincidence, both Landrith and Chiti played as catchers for exactly the same high school, Northwestern High School in Detroit, Michigan. Landrith was the third brother of three to recently catch for Northwestern High, and as Landrith graduated and briefly went to Michigan State before being signed by the Cincinnati Reds, his high school successor was Harry Chiti. Chiti broke a nine-year streak of a Landrith catching behind the plate for the school.

By opening day, Landrith had won the starting role for the Cubs from Chiti. He played in a major league career-high 111 games, but only had a .222 average to go with 4 home runs and 32 RBI to show for it. He was 1st in the National League in gunning down runners attempting to steal a base with 23 and was 2nd in the league with assists as a catcher. However, Landrith was also 3rd in the National League with 10 passed balls and led all the majors in errors committed as a catcher with 14. He grounded into only 2 double plays, having a ratio of 181 plate appearances per double play, good enough for 3rd in the majors. Landrith had a streak of not grounding into a double play that lasted exactly one year, from May 2, 1956, to May 2, 1957.

Chicago ended the 1956 season with an atrocious 60–94 record. In September, general manager Stan Hack was set to be fired at the end of the season. Bob Scheffing was hired as new GM on October 12, and the new Cubs regime made it clear that they were not satisfied with the current platoon of Landrith and Chiti working behind the plate with a combined 50 RBI, also implying that defensively the teams catching "left something to be desired." There was reportedly a deal in the works to send Landrith back to the Cincinnati Reds in exchange for former teammate and fellow catcher Smoky Burgess, but it fell through as Landrith was officially dealt to his new team.

=== St. Louis Cardinals ===
On December 11, 1956, Landrith, along with Jim Davis, Sam Jones, and Eddie Miksis was traded to the St. Louis Cardinals for Wally Lamers, Jackie Collum, Ray Katt, and Tom Poholsky. Landrith locked his in contract for the 1957 season by signing his pact with the Cardinals on December 18. When general manager Fred Hutchinson commented on all the acquisitions the Cards had for the upcoming season, he said that Landrith would be a good backup catcher for current starter Hal Smith, just coming off a successful rookie season.

As planned, Landrith started the season as the Cardinals' number two catcher behind Hal Smith. However, Smith suffered a split index finger on just the third game of the season on April 21 after a foul tip from Cubs hitter Ernie Banks hit Smith's finger and gave him an inch-long cut. It required four stitches to close. Landrith took over in the 3rd inning and closed the game out, then played the full second game of the doubleheader. Landrith took over as starting catcher for most of the week with the newly activated Walker Cooper his backup until Smith returned to action on April 30. In the later months of the season, Landrith started replacing Hal whenever they were up against a right-handed pitcher. His most active month was July, where he hit .279 with 2 home runs and 11 RBI in 21 games for the Cards. He had a better season overall than his one-year stint with the Cubs, hitting .243 with 52 hits and 26 RBI in 75 games.

Landrith was the final Cardinals player to sign his contract for the upcoming 1958 season. He had declined the Cards' first offer, but came to terms on February 5, 1958, for a raise in salary to an estimated $12,000. The Cardinals needed help at the catcher position, but only because they lacked a third catcher that would serve as a suitable backup to Hal and Landrith after last year's third stringer, Walker Cooper, retired from active playing to become a minor league manager. The role would later go to newly reacquired Ray Katt from the San Francisco Giants.

By April, the catching depth chart for St. Louis was no longer set in stone. Hal Smith was in an extended slump during the Cardinals spring training, so Landrith was the opening day starting catcher on April 15 against the Chicago Cubs in a 4–0 defeat. After batting .125 in his first three games, Hal Smith and Ray Katt alternated starting at catcher through May 11 before Smith finally began to work his way out of his hitting funk and once again became the team's number one catcher. Landrith did not see much playing time through the first three months of the season, but carried most of the workload behind the plate in the month of June. Although he played in about the same number of games he did in the previous season, his offensive numbers were way down, putting up only a .215 batting average and 13 RBI in 70 games.

=== San Francisco Giants ===
Landrith was traded to the San Francisco Giants along with teammates Billy Muffett and Benny Valenzuela for Ernie Broglio and Marv Grissom on October 8, 1958. Landrith was originally considered to be a throw-in player for this five player deal. The Giants announced in late February they would only be keeping two catchers on the roster. Bob Schmidt already had a foothold on the starting job, so the battle for Schmidt's backup came down to Landrith and Albert Stieglitz. Stieglitz was optioned to the AAA Phoenix Giants at the beginning of April, removing all doubt that Landrith would serve as Schmidt's backup to begin the 1959 season. For the first two months, Schmidt pulled most of the duty behind the plate for the Giants. However, in June Landrith began to get more starts, and before the month was out Hobie had become the Giants new number 1 catcher.

On one of his first starts on June 5 after becoming the Giants' new starting catcher, Landrith was involved in a bizarre play against Cincinnati Reds runner Pete Whisenant. Whisenant was caught in a rundown between Giants second baseman Daryl Spencer and third baseman Jim Davenport, with the fielders continually playing a game of catch in an effort to tag the runner out. Unknown to Whisenant, Landrith had suddenly rushed up all the way from behind home plate, chest protector and all. Davenport flipped the ball to Landrith and he tagged the runner out. Giants beat writers with combined experience of over 100 years covering the club remarked that it was a dazzling play they had never seen before in professional baseball. Landrith had the best season of his career in 1959. Although he only hit .251 with 29 RBI and 71 hits in 109 games, Giant management was very pleased with Landrith's performance for the season. What was once considered a throw-in player in a trade that was centered on reliever Billy Muffett for the Giants, club president Horace Stoneham said it was a very lucky deal for them, referring to Landrith. He threw out 24 runners attempting to steal a base, which ranked 5th in the National League. Landrith was also 5th in assists and 4th in putouts for National League catchers.

On February 10, 1960, Landrith came to contract terms with the Giants for the upcoming season, reportedly earning between $10,500 and $15,000. On March 2, there was a special clubhouse meeting where the players elected Landrith as the Giants official player representative, succeeding Daryl Spencer after he was traded to the Cardinals. Landrith joked that he won with a platform of, "more pay, shorter hours, fewer umpires and more base-hits." In mid-March, Giants manager Bill Rigney brought in former all-star hitter Lefty O'Doul for hitting drills and learning sessions with some of the team's lighter hitters, including Landrith. Landrith responded the next day by hitting a game-winning home run in the 11th inning of a spring training game off rookie Jim Brewer to help the Giants beat the Chicago Cubs 7–6.

By late March sports writers were already penciling in Landrith as the definite opening day starter behind home plate for San Francisco, but on April 3, Landrith had a freak accident with his hand in an exhibition game against the Cubs, suffering a hair-line fracture on the back of his index finger. He hit the bat or helmet of Cubs hitter Lou Johnson when Lou got out in front of the plate after a swinging strike out in the 4th inning. Landrith attempted to throw the ball to second base as Johnson swung his bat, causing the injury. Frank Bowman, trainer for the Giants, expected him to miss 10 days and opening day. He returned to batting practice on April 19 and pinch hit for the Giants on April 22 against the Cubs, but did not return to full action until almost a full month later on May 2.

On his return game against the Milwaukee Braves, his teammates joked that he had a "perfect" night, as he went 1-for-1 with a single, two walks, and a successful squeeze play. On May 25, there was a play at the plate with the Giants up 2–1 against the Philadelphia Phillies where Phillies pitcher Robin Roberts attempted to run for home off a ground ball in the third inning. He collided with Landrith, knocking Landrith unconscious as he rolled over onto his back. Despite being knocked out, he held onto the ball, saving the Giants lead. At the end of May, Landrith lost his starting role back to Bob Schmidt. He only had a .208 batting average combined with a .221 slugging percentage. Landrith hit very well in July and August, hitting .305 over the two-month stretch.

On July 19, Landrith caught for the historical debut game of legendary Dominican Hall of Fame pitcher Juan Marichal. Marichal just missed being the first pitcher since 1898 to hurl a no-hitter in his first major league start. He settled for being the first National League rookie to ever throw a one-hitter in his debut. Landrith said of the young 21-year-old: "The kid showed a lot of poise. He's got good control and he doesn't scare." On August 16 against the Cardinals, Landrith hit 4 for 5 with 3 doubles and 3 RBI, helping the Giants beat St. Louis 7–3. He finished the season with a .242 average and 20 RBI in 71 games.

In October, the Giants toured Japan. Landrith was looking forward to his first trip to the Orient after just missing out on a tour after the 1958 season with the St. Louis Cardinals. He had gotten all of his shots and inoculations, all ready to make the trip to Japan, and just three days before the Cards went to Japan he was traded to the Giants. He was greatly disappointed that he didn't receive the chance to play against the greats in Japan. "I wanted to make that trip more than anything else." He didn't miss this trip, playing behind the plate for the Giants against all challengers in Japan. To further United States-Japan good will, Landrith and the Giants placed flowers at the Atomic Bomb Memorial Shrine in Hiroshima. After the ceremony, the Giants played the final game of their 16-game tour of Japan, beating the Japanese All-Stars 4 to 1 before a crowd of 12,000. Landrith hit .348 for the series.

Landrith signed his contract for the 1961 season on February 11. New manager Alvin Dark warned veteran regulars that there would be battles for spots on the depth chart at every position for the upcoming season, and the catcher position was no exception. In February, Schmidt and Landrith had two new competitors thrown into the foray. Tom Haller and John Orsino were originally considered threats to shake up the depth chart order. Haller was the strongest threat, going getting 10 hits, including 4 home runs, 2 doubles, and 2 triples in just his first 20 at-bats for spring training. Tom's impressive play continued through mid-April, earning him the opening day starting job over Schmidt and Landrith. Hobie retained his spot as the number two catcher, with Schmidt dropping all the way from first to third. Landrith played in only three games in April, but made the most of his season debut game against the Pittsburgh Pirates. The Pirates were up 1–0 with 1 out in the bottom of the 11th when Landrith hit a game tying home run to deep right field off reliever Roy Face.

Haller quickly fell out of favor with Giants management. The team got off to a fair 7–5 start, but the once hot bat cooled off considerably, hitting just .133 in 30 at-bats. This sparked the Giants to go looking elsewhere for a catcher that could provide significant offense for the team, and they found it in Cincinnati on April 27 when they traded Schmidt, Don Blasingame, and Sherman Jones to the Reds for catcher and noteworthy slugger Ed Bailey. Bailey immediately took over as starting catcher for the Giants, with Landrith remaining the second-string catcher and Haller demoted to third. Landrith's playing time was severely limited for the season, playing in only 43 games. He got occasional starts in August to catch for starting pitcher Mike McCormick after manager Dark thought Landrith's catching was likely a major factor in McCormick winning 15 games in 1960, but that was about all. Landrith hit .239 with just 10 RBI in 71 at-bats.

=== New York Mets ===
On October 10, 1961, the New York Mets, an expansion team used their first pick in the 1961 Major League Baseball expansion draft to select Landrith second overall. New York manager Casey Stengel justified the choice by explaining that, "You gotta have a catcher or you're gonna have a lot of passed balls." When Landrith was sent a contract offer by Weiss, he turned it down as Landrith said it was at least a $3,000 pay cut. He told Weiss that the offer was "totally unacceptable." Weiss sent exactly the same contract three times, eventually leading to Landrith giving up and signing the deal. He signed his official contract to play in the inaugural season of the New York Mets on February 11, 1962. Landrith was slated to be the first-string catcher, with young players Chris Cannizzaro and Choo-Choo Coleman as his backups. Before opening day, Landrith had a brief scare against the Chicago White Sox on April 4. Chicago outfielder Floyd Robinson fouled off a pitch with a hard swing. In the follow-through, the bat hit the right side of Landrith's head, knocking him to the ground. Landrith was led off to the dressing room, but was in good enough shape to play in the fast approaching regular season.

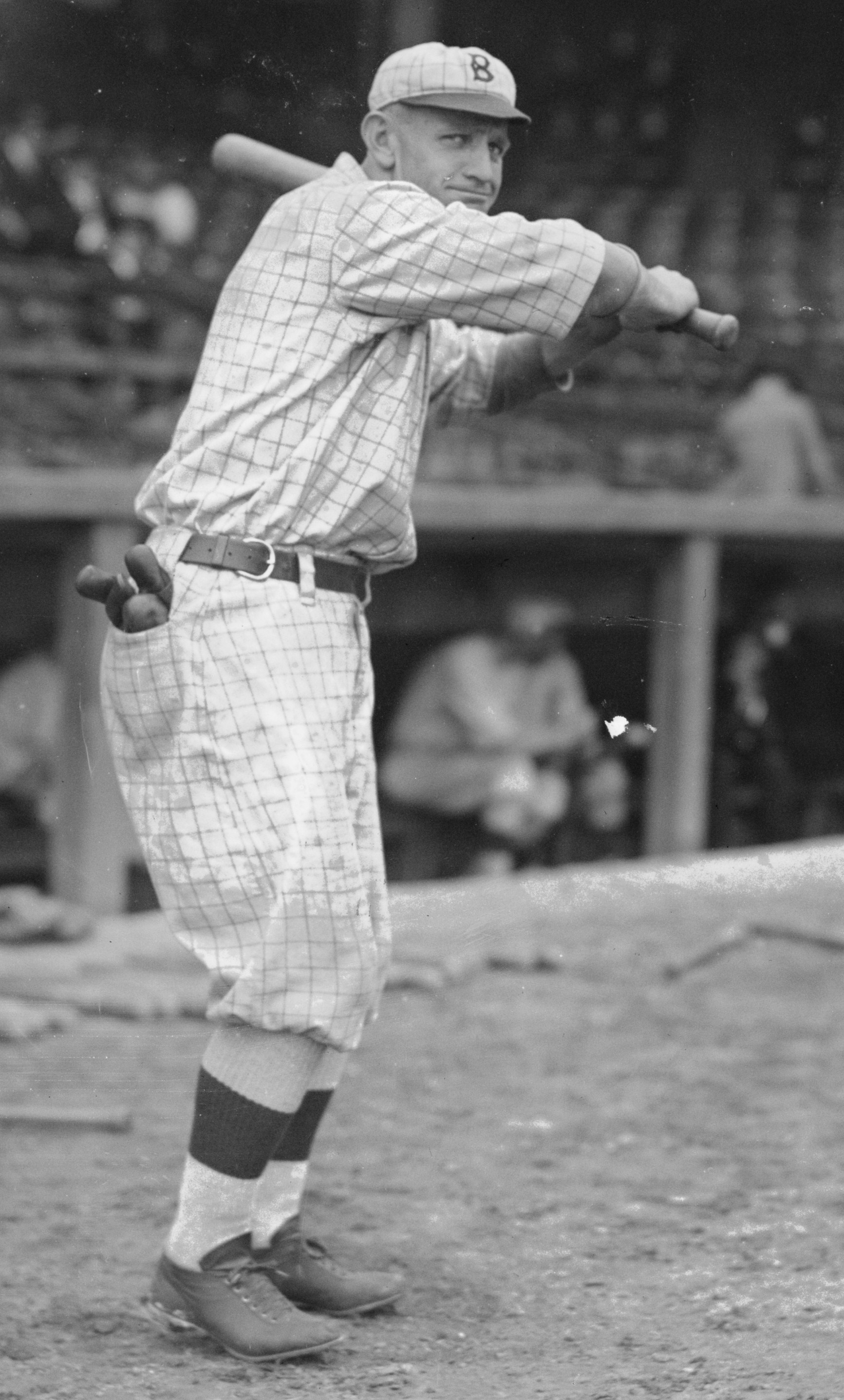
Landrith was the first draft choice in the 1961 Expansion Draft by Casey Stengel (pictured).

Landrith played at catcher in the New York Mets very first regular season game on April 11, 1962, against the St. Louis Cardinals, batting eighth in the order and going 0-for-4 in an 11–4 loss. The Cardinals stole three bases with Landrith behind the plate. Centerfielder Curt Flood stole two bases and second baseman Julián Javier also stole a base. Landrith was also charged with an error, one of three Mets errors on the day. Stengel gave up on Landrith after one game, giving the starting job to Joe Ginsberg. After Ginsberg had an 0 for 4 day in the Mets' second game, he then gave the job to Cannizaro. A round robin of catchers played for the Mets that season; the Mets used seven different catchers, with none playing in more than 70 games.

Landrith's only home run as a Met came when he pinch hit in the bottom of the ninth inning with the Mets down 2–1 against the Milwaukee Braves and all-time pitching great Warren Spahn. When Landrith reached the batter's box, Stengel called time out, going to the batter's box and whispering something in Landrith's ear. On the first pitch, Landrith hit a game-winning two-run home run. After the game, Stengel remarked, "I told him to hit a home run." In typical Mets form for the inaugural season, the win was almost voided when Rod Kanehl, pinch runner for Gil Hodges, failed to touch third base after the home run. Third base coach Solly Hemus gave Landrith a sign to slow down, then escorted Kanehl back to third base. If Landrith touched third base before Kanehl, Rod would have been called out and the Braves would have gained a win on a walk-off home run by the opposing team. After Landrith's game-winning blast, he had raised his average all the way to .421, including a one-month stint between April 21 and May 19 where he hit .391 with a 1.169 OPS.

=== Baltimore Orioles ===
On June 7, 1962, the Mets traded Landrith to the Baltimore Orioles as the player to be named later in the earlier trade in which the Mets acquired Marv Throneberry. With Orioles starting catcher Gus Triandos injured with a fractured knuckle, Landrith took over the starting role for almost all games in the month of June. In his first two weeks, Landrith was batting just above .100, although he made the most of his first five hits, slamming three home runs in three separate Baltimore victories, including a walk-off two-run home run on June 22 against the Boston Red Sox.

Landrith made immediate headlines when he was involved in a scuffle against the New York Yankees on June 11. Rookie Oriole outfielder Boog Powell was hospitalized after Yankees pitcher Bud Daley beaned Powell in the head with a pitch in the top of the 4th. In the bottom of the 4th, Baltimore pitcher Robin Roberts immediately threw a fastball over the head of Yankees star Roger Maris. Maris started walking toward the mound, bat in hand. Roberts was afraid that if things got physical he would break his hand. Landrith jumped on Maris' back, clearing the benches. No punches were thrown in the incident, nor were any suspensions or fines levied by American League president Joe Cronin. The Orioles won 5-3.

Journalists that covered the Mets claimed that Landrith was incapable of throwing out runners that attempted to steal bases off him. The Orioles ignored the claim, insisting that they sought after him because he could indeed throw well. Based on the New York scouting report, American League teams aggressively tried to steal bases against the Orioles when Landrith joined the team. In his first week, 11 runners tried to steal a base off Landrith. He threw out six runners, immediately removing the stigma that he could not throw. The blame for the high stolen base count against the Mets was promptly shifted away from Landrith and onto the New York Mets pitching.

Landrith's hot bat cooled off in the final three months of the season. Split between the Mets and the Orioles, he hit .236 with five home runs and 24 RBIs in 83 games. He threw out 43.9% of runners that tried to steal a base off him, good enough for fourth-best among all AL catchers.

For the 1963 season, former Giants teammate John Orsino was slated to continue being the Orioles starter at catcher, with Landrith, Charley Lau, and Dick Brown competing for roster spots on the probable three deep catcher depth chart. Landrith did make the roster, but only had one at bat in two games before being sold to the Washington Senators.

=== Washington Senators ===
On May 8, 1963, the Baltimore Orioles sold Landrith to the Washington Senators for a reported $20,000, with his salary estimated to be around $14,000. He struggled with the Senators, hitting .173 with one home run and seven RBIs in 42 games before breaking his hand on a foul tip off a pitch from Steve Ridzik of the New York Yankees on August 7. He was given his unconditional release from Washington on December 6.

Landrith rejoined the Senators on February 15, 1964 as a coach, with the possible option that he would return as an active player should the Senators trade away one of their current catchers. However, the opportunity never arose. Landrith brought his playing career to a close in an AL-NL benefit game on February 14, 1965, for the widow of Red Adams, a deceased custodian at Candlestick Park, helping to raise over $8,000.

== Playing style ==
Although Landrith was small for his position, standing at 5 feet 10 inches (1.78 m) and weighing 170 pounds (77 kg), he made his presence known on the field with his loud voice. Barely a month after his first call-up to the majors with the Cincinnati Reds, he made national news for being a "Holler Guy", bringing to the league what was referred to as "a brand of on-the-field chatter which hasn't been heard since the days of Leo (Gabby) Hartnett." His shrill "holler" was heard throughout the whole ballpark.

Aside from being the loudest catcher in the majors, Landrith also had a philosophy of talking things over with his pitcher face to face on the mound, early and often. It is normal for catchers to occasionally call a timeout and go the mound to talk with his pitcher, especially in crucial situations, but Hobie took this facet of the game to new extremes. It was not unusual for Hobie to make many as five visits to the mound in an inning. He once visited the mound ten times in a single inning to chat with Giants pitcher Sam Jones. Landrith was once described as a "legendary chatterbox". He was inspired to have his frequent consultations at the mound by Birdie Tebbetts and Yogi Berra. He insisted that he did not commit this practice to stall for time, but because he believed "there should be a closer relationship between pitcher and catcher. [...] I run out to the mound to eliminate any indecision on the pitcher's part and mine. Some batsmen have to be pitched to very carefully."

== Coaching career ==
As early as 1948, Hobie Landrith expressed great interest in becoming a baseball general manager. At the Chicago Cubs training camp in Mesa, Arizona, Landrith said that his main ambition was to become a manager, and that he was preparing himself daily for when the time came.

Landrith was in line to become the manager of Leones de Ponce of the Puerto Rico Baseball League in the winter of 1955, but a newer regulation prevented him from being allowed to take the position. In November 1963, Hobie was one of two candidates to become the new bullpen coach for the Baltimore Orioles, but it fell through.

On February 15, 1964, the Washington Senators announced that they hired Landrith as a coach. After the Senators compiled a 62–100 record for the 1964 season, he and Danny O'Connell surprised Senator management when they quit as coaches of the team on January 19, 1965 to each pursue careers in private businesses. Hobie became a public relations worker for Volkswagen in the California, Nevada, and Utah tri-state territory.

In 1998, Landrith, along with Willie Mays, Mike McCormick, Orlando Cepeda, and Dave Righetti were invited to the San Francisco Giants spring training camp as guest instructors.

== Personal life ==
Landrith met his wife, Peggy, at Estabrook Grammar School in tenth grade. They had six children: Gary, Carol, Randy, Beth, David and Linda. While Landrith was playing winter ball in Puerto Rico, his wife gave birth to Randy on November 18, 1954. With the team owner's approval, he flew home on Christmas day to see his new son at his own expense. The downside to this was after paying to fly back and playing in just one game, his team released him despite having the 3rd highest batting average in the league.

Four days after Landrith was drafted by the Mets, his son David was born at Mills Hospital in San Mateo, California, on October 14, 1961. David Landrith played two seasons in the minor leagues from 1983 to 1984 in the Kansas City Royals farm system for the Butte Copper Kings and Charleston Royals after being drafted in the 12th round, 309th overall by Kansas City in the 1983 MLB draft. He had previously turned down an offer to play professional baseball after being drafted in the sixth round of the 1979 MLB draft by the Cleveland Indians. A year later, David was part of the Arizona Wildcats baseball team becoming national champions in winning the 1980 College World Series. David was the head coach of the Flowing Wells High School baseball team in Tucson, Arizona, for twenty years.

After being traded to the Chicago Cubs, Landrith took a winter job as an auto salesman in Detroit, Michigan. When his career in baseball was over, Landrith joined the auto business full-time in January 1965 as a public relations agent. He was the director of sales for 45 Volkswagen dealerships in northern California. Landrith died on April 6, 2023, at home in Sunnyvale, California, at age 93.
