= Canadian lakes =

Canadian lakes can refer to:

- List of lakes of Canada
- Canadian Lakes, Ballarat Victoria
- Canadian Lakes, Michigan
