= 1961 Major League Baseball All-Star Game (first game) =

1961 American baseball competition

| | 1 | 2 | 3 | 4 | 5 | 6 | 7 | 8 | 9 | 10 | R | H | E |
|---|---|---|---|---|---|---|---|---|---|---|---|---|---|
| American League | 0 | 0 | 0 | 0 | 0 | 1 | 0 | 0 | 2 | 1 | 4 | 4 | 2 |
| National League | 0 | 1 | 0 | 1 | 0 | 0 | 0 | 1 | 0 | 2 | 5 | 11 | 5 |
- Date: July 11, 1961
- Venue: Candlestick Park
- City: San Francisco, California
- Managers: Paul Richards (BAL); Danny Murtaugh (PIT)
- Attendance: 44,115
- Television: NBC
- TV announcers: Mel Allen and Russ Hodges
- Radio: NBC
- Radio announcers: Jimmy Dudley and Jerry Doggett

The first 1961 Major League Baseball All-Star Game was played in Candlestick Park in San Francisco on July 11, 1961. The National League scored two runs in the bottom of the tenth inning to win 5–4. Stu Miller was the winning pitcher and Hoyt Wilhelm was charged with the loss.

This was the first of two all-star games in 1961. From 1959 to 1962, two such were held each season to increase the money going to the players' pension fund. This practice ended after the owners agreed to give the players a larger share of the income from a single game.

== Rosters ==
Players in italics have since been inducted into the National Baseball Hall of Fame.

=== American League ===
Starters
| Position | Player | Team | All-Star Games |
|---|---|---|---|
| P | Whitey Ford | Yankees | 8 |
| C | Johnny Romano | Indians | 1 |
| 1B | Norm Cash | Tigers | 1 |
| 2B | Johnny Temple | Indians | 5 |
| 3B | Brooks Robinson | Orioles | 3 |
| SS | Tony Kubek | Yankees | 3 |
| OF | Rocky Colavito | Tigers | 3 |
| OF | Mickey Mantle | Yankees | 12 |
| OF | Roger Maris | Yankees | 4 |

Pitchers
| Position | Player | Team | All-Star Games |
|---|---|---|---|
| P | Jim Bunning | Tigers | 3 |
| P | Dick Donovan | Senators | 2 |
| P | Ryne Duren | Angels | 4 |
| P | Mike Fornieles | Red Sox | 1 |
| P | Frank Lary | Tigers | 3 |
| P | Jim Perry | Indians | 1 |
| P | Billy Pierce | White Sox | 7 |
| P | Hoyt Wilhelm | Orioles | 4 |

Reserves
| Position | Player | Team | All-Star Games |
|---|---|---|---|
| C | Elston Howard | Yankees | 6 |
| 1B | Jim Gentile | Orioles | 3 |
| 1B | Harmon Killebrew | Twins | 3 |
| 2B | Nellie Fox | White Sox | 13 |
| SS | Dick Howser | Athletics | 1 |
| OF | Yogi Berra | Yankees | 16 |
| OF | Jackie Brandt | Orioles | 1 |
| OF | Al Kaline | Tigers | 9 |

=== National League ===
Starters
| Position | Player | Team | All-Star Games |
|---|---|---|---|
| P | Warren Spahn | Braves | 13 |
| C | Smoky Burgess | Pirates | 7 |
| 1B | Bill White | Cardinals | 4 |
| 2B | Frank Bolling | Braves | 1 |
| 3B | Eddie Mathews | Braves | 10 |
| SS | Maury Wills | Dodgers | 1 |
| OF | Orlando Cepeda | Giants | 5 |
| OF | Roberto Clemente | Pirates | 3 |
| OF | Willie Mays | Giants | 10 |

Pitchers
| Position | Player | Team | All-Star Games |
|---|---|---|---|
| P | Roy Face | Pirates | 5 |
| P | Joey Jay | Reds | 1 |
| P | Sandy Koufax | Dodgers | 1 |
| P | Art Mahaffey | Phillies | 1 |
| P | Mike McCormick | Giants | 3 |
| P | Stu Miller | Giants | 1 |
| P | Bob Purkey | Reds | 2 |

Reserves
| Position | Player | Team | All-Star Games |
|---|---|---|---|
| C | John Roseboro | Dodgers | 2 |
| 1B | Dick Stuart | Pirates | 1 |
| 2B | Don Zimmer | Cubs | 1 |
| 3B | Ken Boyer | Cardinals | 6 |
| SS | Eddie Kasko | Reds | 1 |
| OF | Hank Aaron | Braves | 9 |
| OF | George Altman | Cubs | 1 |
| OF | Stan Musial | Cardinals | 20 |
| OF | Frank Robinson | Reds | 5 |

== Game ==
Umpires: Stan Landes, Home Plate (NL); Frank Umont, First Base (AL); Shag Crawford, Second Base (NL); Ed Runge, Third Base (AL); Ed Vargo, Left Field (NL); Cal Drummond, Right Field (AL)

=== Starting lineups ===
| American League | | | | National League | | | |
| Order | Player | Team | Position | Order | Player | Team | Position |
| 1 | Johnny Temple | Indians | 2B | 1 | Maury Wills | Dodgers | SS |
| 2 | Norm Cash | Tigers | 1B | 2 | Eddie Mathews | Braves | 3B |
| 3 | Mickey Mantle | Yankees | OF | 3 | Willie Mays | Giants | OF |
| 4 | Roger Maris | Yankees | OF | 4 | Orlando Cepeda | Giants | OF |
| 5 | Rocky Colavito | Tigers | OF | 5 | Roberto Clemente | Pirates | OF |
| 6 | Tony Kubek | Yankees | SS | 6 | Bill White | Cardinals | 1B |
| 7 | Johnny Romano | Tigers | C | 7 | Frank Bolling | Braves | 2B |
| 8 | Brooks Robinson | Orioles | 3B | 8 | Smoky Burgess | Pirates | C |
| 9 | Whitey Ford | Yankees | P | 9 | Warren Spahn | Braves | P |

=== Game summary ===
Tuesday, July 11, 1961 1:00 pm (PT) at Candlestick Park in San Francisco, California
| Team | 1 | 2 | 3 | 4 | 5 | 6 | 7 | 8 | 9 | 10 | R | H | E |
|---|---|---|---|---|---|---|---|---|---|---|---|---|---|
| American League | 0 | 0 | 0 | 0 | 0 | 1 | 0 | 0 | 2 | 1 | 4 | 4 | 2 |
| National League | 0 | 1 | 0 | 1 | 0 | 0 | 0 | 1 | 0 | 2 | 5 | 11 | 5 |
WP: Stu Miller (1–0) LP: Hoyt Wilhelm (0–1); Home runs: AL: Harmon Killebrew (1); NL: George Altman (1)
