= George Altman =

American baseball player (1933–2025)

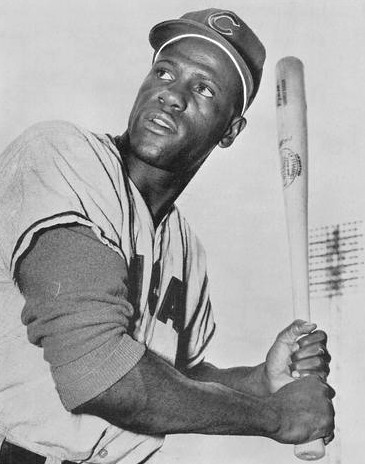
- Altman in 1961
- Outfielder
- Born: March 20, 1933; Goldsboro, North Carolina, U.S.
- Died: November 24, 2025 (aged 92); O'Fallon, Missouri, U.S.
- Batted: Left Threw: Right

Professional debut
- MLB: April 11, 1959, for the Chicago Cubs
- NPB: April 6, 1968, for the Tokyo Orions

Last appearance
- MLB: October 1, 1967, for the Chicago Cubs
- NPB: October 16, 1975, for the Hanshin Tigers

MLB statistics
- Batting average: .269
- Home runs: 101
- Runs batted in: 403

NPB statistics
- Batting average: .309
- Home runs: 205
- Runs batted in: 656
- Stats at Baseball Reference

Teams
- Chicago Cubs (1959–1962); St. Louis Cardinals (1963); New York Mets (1964); Chicago Cubs (1965–1967); Tokyo / Lotte Orions (1968–1974); Hanshin Tigers (1975)

Career highlights and awards
- 3× All-Star (1961, 1961², 1962²)

George Lee Altman (March 20, 1933 – November 24, 2025) was an American professional baseball outfielder who had a lengthy career in both Major League Baseball (MLB) and Nippon Professional Baseball. A three-time National League (NL) All-Star, he appeared in 991 games over nine full seasons in the major leagues. Then, at age 35, he began an eight-year tenure in Japanese baseball, where he would hit 205 home runs and bat .309 with 985 hits.

Altman batted left-handed and threw right-handed; he was listed as 6 feet 4 inches (1.93 m) tall and 200 pounds (91 kg).

== Early life and college ==
Altman was born on March 20, 1933, in Goldsboro, North Carolina. Altman's mother died when he was four years old. He attended Dillard High School in Goldsboro, where he was captain of the school's basketball team (1950–51), and was a sharpshooting center. He worked in tobacco fields as a youth. As a high school sophomore Altman decided to get serious about his studies so he could go to college, and not be limited to a future of either working in the tobacco fields or a factory in his hometown.

An assistant athletics coach at Altman's high school recommended he attend Tennessee State University (then known as Tennessee Agricultural and Industrial College), a historically black college (HBCU) in Nashville, where he played baseball and basketball, graduating with honors in 1955. He achieved honor roll status and was a member of the sports fraternity Alpha Phi Alpha.

He originally only played basketball at Tennessee State, as the school did not have a baseball team until his junior year. In his junior year, Naismith Memorial Hall of Fame coach John McClendon (who had actually played basketball under James Naismith) became the team's coach. Even before McClendon came on, Altman's Tennessee State team became the first HBCU school to participate in the National Association of Intercollegiate Athletics (NAIA) national basketball tournament.

Altman began playing baseball at Tennessee State in his junior year. Among his teammates was future major league player Fred Valentine. In addition to competing against other college teams, they played against Army base teams and Negro League teams.

== Baseball career ==
=== In North America ===
==== Monarchs and Cubs ====
Altman's original plan after graduating from college was to become a basketball coach, and he had been offered a position at Memphis’ Lemoyne College. But a Tennessee A & I official recommended him to the Kansas City Monarchs of the Negro American League. When he went for a tryout, he was immediately included on the team and his first professional baseball experience came with the Monarchs, where he played three months for the team in 1955. He then was signed by the Chicago Cubs in August 1955, on the recommendation of future Hall of Famer Buck O'Neil, the Monarchs player-manager who later became a Cubs scout in 1956.

The Cubs purchased his contract rights from the Monarchs, along with Joe Hartman and Louis Johnson. He made the Cubs' roster in 1959 after two years in the minor leagues (all of 1956 and part of 1958) and two in the United States Army (all of 1957 and part of 1958, where he played baseball and basketball for the Fort Carson team). He also played winter league baseball (1958–59) for Marlboro of the Panama Winter League. Altman would also play winter ball in Cuba during his career.

In 1959, Altman started 102 games in center field, including on Opening Day, when he went two for three against Don Drysdale in a 6–1 Chicago victory. He batted only .245 as a rookie, but had 12 home runs, 47 runs batted in (RBI), and 54 runs scored, and was selected the team's rookie-of-the-year by the city's sportswriters. Altman's first major league hitting coach was Rogers Hornsby, who has the second highest lifetime batting average in MLB history, and who helped Altman as a hitter.

Altman's playing time diminished slightly in 1960, playing on an injured ankle, and suffering from the lingering effects of having mononucleosis for which he had been hospitalized in March. He started at all three outfield positions, as well as at first base. However, in 95 less plate appearances, Altman raised his batting average (.266), home runs (13) and RBIs (51). His slugging percentage jumped from .383 in 1959 to .455 in 1960.

In 1961, he claimed the Cubs' starting right field job. He was hitting .349 by the All-Star break, only behind Roberto Clemente's .357 batting average in the National League. Altman was named an All-Star in 1961, and played in both All-Star games that year (MLB played two such games from 1959 through 1962). In his first All-Star at bat, during that season's first midsummer classic at Candlestick Park on July 11, Altman hit a pinch hit home run off Mike Fornieles in the eighth inning. Altman was familiar with Fornieles as they had played against each other in Cuban winter league baseball. The National League ultimately prevailed in the wind-blown contest, 5–4 (in which the winning pitcher Stu Miller was literally blown off the mound while pitching).

For the year, Altman batted .303 in 138 games, smashed 27 home runs, and led the National League in triples with 12. He was in the NL top-ten hitters for home runs, batting average, slugging percentage, on-base plus slugging (OPS), total bases and RBIs. He was 14th in NL Most Valuable Player voting. He won player of the month honors over Willie Mays, during a period in which he had hits in 26 of 30 games played. Altman was also known for his defensive skills, and led NL right fielders in fielding percentage in 1961 (.981).

He followed his 1961 season with another strong showing in 1962. Once again making the All-Star team for that year's second game, Altman set personal bests in games played (147), hits (170), batting average (.318) and stolen bases (19). He was sixth in the NL in batting average, fourth in on-base percentage, seventh in OPS, ninth in slugging percentage, and sixth in stolen bases. He also slugged 22 homers, and was in the top three in fielding percentage among NL right fielders (.976).

But the Cubs suffered through an embarrassing, ninth-place season, losing over 100 games. In the 1962–1963 offseason, Altman became a major piece in a six-player trade with the St. Louis Cardinals that brought pitchers Larry Jackson and Lindy McDaniel to Chicago. It was considered a big trade, as the Cubs were giving up their best hitter to bolster their pitching. However, Altman would not again reach the hitting prowess he achieved in 1961–62.

==== St. Louis Cardinals, New York Mets, Cubs ====
Altman became the 1963 Cardinals' starting right fielder and played a role in a pennant race that saw the Redbirds challenge the eventual world champion Los Angeles Dodgers into late September before a six-game losing streak from September 16–24 took them from one game out of first place to 6.5 games back, and doomed their chances. They finished in second place, six games behind the Dodgers. Altman started 111 games in right field, principally splitting time in right field with Gary Kolb (19 starts) and Charlie James (21 starts).

But Altman's production declined, as he was platooned and started only against right-handed pitching; his average fell 44 points to .274, and he hit only nine home runs. He still had the fifth best fielding percentage among NL right fielders.

Again, he was traded in the off-season, sent to the last-place New York Mets for pitcher Roger Craig in November. Altman played four more years in the majors. Only in 1964, his sole season with the Mets, did he play regularly. But he suffered a shoulder injury in spring training, and struggled offensively, hitting .230 in 124 games, again hitting only nine homers, and was traded back to the Cubs in January 1965. Playing three years for the Cubs as a spare outfielder, he appeared in 90 games in 1965, 88 games in 1966, and only 15 in 1967, his final MLB season.

Altman spent most of the 1967 season with the Triple-A Tacoma Cubs of the Pacific Coast League, where at age 34 he played regularly and regained his batting stroke. He hit .280, with 15 home runs, 70 RBIs, 65 runs and a .838 OPS in only 108 games and 378 at bats.

=== In Japan ===
Altman's revival at Tacoma served him well the following season, when he began his career in Japanese baseball. He played from 1968 through 1975 for the Tokyo/Lotte Orions of the Japan Pacific League (1968–74) and the Hanshin Tigers of the Japan Central League (1975), and enjoyed seasons of 39, 34 and 30 home runs—and four more years with 20 or more home runs—and batted over .300 six times. Highlights from his NPB career included leading the Pacific League in hits (170), runs (84), and RBIs (100) in 1968; and being named to the "Best Nine" Pacific League team in 1968, 1970, and 1971. He credited martial arts training for baseball success in Japan.

=== MLB totals ===
In his nine-year major league career with the Cubs, Cardinals and Mets, Altman batted .269; his 832 hits included 132 doubles, 34 triples, and 101 home runs. He had 403 RBIs in 991 games played. He recorded a .981 fielding percentage playing at all three outfield positions and first base. In three All-Star Game appearances, his 1961 homer was his only hit in three at bats; he played errorless ball in the field over three innings as the National League's right fielder in 1961's second midsummer classic, played July 31 at Fenway Park.

Altman was the first of only three players, along with Hall of Fame Cub Ernie Banks and three-time All-Star Felipe Alou, to hit two home runs in a game against Hall of Fame pitcher Sandy Koufax.

== Legacy and honors ==
In February 1960, Goldsboro celebrated George Altman Day. In 1961, he was inducted into the National Association of Intercollegiate Athletics Hall of Fame. In 1983, he was inducted into the Tennessee State University Hall of Fame.

Altman believed his career was diminished by injury, saying "I could have had a much better career if I didn’t get hurt. At that time, there were no trainers or agents to look out for you". He played hurt instead of resting in the Major Leagues because that was the expectation of his managers at the time. He was healthiest when he played in Japan because of a superior training regimen.

== Personal life and death ==
During the baseball offseason, he worked as a substitute elementary school teacher.

Altman overcame colon cancer at age 42, while playing baseball in Japan.

After retiring from professional baseball, Altman became a commodities trader at the Chicago Board of Trade.

Altman retired with his wife Etta to O'Fallon, Missouri, near the National Horseshoe Pitchers Association Hall of Fame and Museum. He became involved with horseshoe competitions, and was on a team that won a nationally sanctioned event in 2012.

In 2013, Altman co-authored his autobiography, George Altman: My Baseball Journey from the Negro Leagues to the Majors and Beyond.

Altman died in O'Fallon on November 24, 2025, at the age of 92.

== See also ==
- List of Major League Baseball annual triples leaders
- List of Negro league baseball players who played in Major League Baseball

Preceded by Joey Jay	Major League Player of the Month; June, 1961	Succeeded by Frank Robinson
