= Eddie Kasko =

American baseball player (1931–2020)

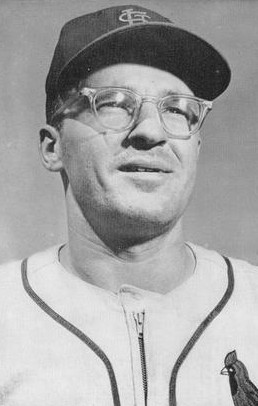
- Kasko in 1957
- Shortstop / Third baseman / Manager
- Born: June 27, 1931; Elizabeth, New Jersey, U.S.
- Died: June 24, 2020 (aged 88); Richmond, Virginia, U.S.
- Batted: Right Threw: Right

MLB debut
- April 18, 1957, for the St. Louis Cardinals

Last MLB appearance
- September 10, 1966, for the Boston Red Sox

MLB statistics
- Batting average: .264
- Home runs: 22
- Runs batted in: 261
- Managerial record: 345–295
- Winning %: .539
- Stats at Baseball Reference
- Managerial record at Baseball Reference

Teams
- As player: St. Louis Cardinals (1957–1958); Cincinnati Reds (1959–1963); Houston Colt .45s / Astros (1964–1965); Boston Red Sox (1966); As manager: Boston Red Sox (1970–1973)

Career highlights and awards
- 2× All-Star (1961, 1961²); Boston Red Sox Hall of Fame

Edward Michael Kasko (June 27, 1931 – June 24, 2020) was an American infielder, manager, scout and front office executive in Major League Baseball (MLB).

Kasko was born in Elizabeth, New Jersey, and raised in nearby Linden. He graduated from Linden High School in 1949.

== Standout defensive player ==
Kasko stood 6 feet (1.83 m) tall and weighed 180 pounds (82 kg). A standout defensive player as a shortstop and third baseman, he began his professional career in 1949. After six years in minor league baseball and two in the military at the time of the Korean War, Kasko played for ten MLB seasons (1957–66) with the St. Louis Cardinals, Cincinnati Reds, Houston Colt .45s / Astros and Boston Red Sox. He led National League third basemen in fielding percentage in 1960 and NL shortstops in that category four years later.

A right-handed batter, Kasko had a career batting average of .264 in 1,077 games and 3,546 at bats. His 935 Major League hits included 146 doubles and 13 triples, as well as 22 home runs. Selected to the 1961 National League All-Star team, he appeared in that year's second all-star classic, played July 31 at Fenway Park. In the contest, a 1–1 tie shortened by rain, Kasko replaced starter Maury Wills at shortstop in the fourth inning and singled off Don Schwall of the Red Sox in the sixth frame to help the Senior Circuit score the tying run. Hall of Fame shortstop Ernie Banks pinch-hit for Kasko in the eighth inning and replaced him in the field.

Kasko appeared in one World Series—also in 1961, with Cincinnati. He started all five games (the New York Yankees defeated the Reds, four games to one) at shortstop, led the Reds with seven hits (all singles), scored one run, and batted .318. Defensively, he made one error in 27 chances in the field and participated in five double plays.

== Managing career ==
After the 1966 season, his only campaign with Boston, Kasko retired as an active player and managed the Red Sox' Triple-A clubs, the Toronto Maple Leafs (1967) and Louisville Colonels (1968–69), to a cumulative 213–213 record and one playoff berth.

He succeeded the popular Dick Williams as Red Sox manager in 1970, and guided the club through 1973. The Red Sox finished above the .500 mark each season, but only contended in 1972 when they finished a half-game out of first place, behind the Detroit Tigers, in the American League East Division. The half-game differential was due to the brief players' strike that spring: between six and eight games were lopped off each club's schedule and it was agreed that lost games would not be "made up" to resolve pennant races.

During Kasko's four-year managerial term, he incorporated young players such as Carlton Fisk and Dwight Evans into the Red Sox lineup, converted relief pitcher Bill Lee into a successful starter, and showed patience with sore-armed veteran Luis Tiant as he returned to form. But when the 1973 Red Sox again could not measure up to the powerful Baltimore Orioles of the era, Kasko was reassigned to an executive scouting position within the organization and replaced as manager by Darrell Johnson upon season's end on September 30. His final record with Boston, over four seasons, was 345–295 (.539).

=== Managerial record ===
Team	Year	Regular season					Postseason			
Team	Year	Games	Won	Lost	Win %	Finish	Won	Lost	Win %	Result
BOS	1970	162	87	75	.537	3rd in AL East	–	–	–	–
BOS	1971	162	85	77	.525	3rd in AL East	–	–	–	–
BOS	1972	155	85	70	.548	2nd in AL East	–	–	–	–
BOS	1973	161	88	73	.547	2nd in AL East	–	–	–	–
Total		640	345	295	.539		0	0	–	

== Scouting director ==
Kasko remained with the Red Sox for another two decades as a scout (1974–77), director of scouting (1977–92) and vice president, baseball development (1992–94). While he was scouting director, the Red Sox drafted and signed impactful players like Roger Clemens, Marty Barrett, Ellis Burks, Mike Greenwell, John Valentin, Tim Naehring, Jeff Bagwell, Curt Schilling, Brady Anderson and Mo Vaughn, although Bagwell, Anderson and Schilling became stars for other teams after Boston traded them for veteran talent. Kasko was named to the Boston Red Sox Hall of Fame in 2010.

He died in Richmond, Virginia, his longtime adopted home city, at age 88 on June 24, 2020.

Preceded by Dick Williams	Toronto Maple Leafs manager 1967	Succeeded by Franchise relocated
Preceded by Franchise re-established	Louisville Colonels manager 1968–1969	Succeeded by Billy Gardner
