= 1961 Major League Baseball All-Star Game (second game) =

1961 American baseball competition

	1	2	3	4	5	6	7	8	9	R	H	E
National League	0	0	0	0	0	1	0	0	0	1	5	1
American League	1	0	0	0	0	0	0	0	0	1	4	0
- Date: July 31, 1961
- Venue: Fenway Park
- City: Boston, Massachusetts
- Managers: Danny Murtaugh (PIT); Paul Richards (BAL)
- Attendance: 31,851
- Television: NBC
- TV announcers: Curt Gowdy and Joe Garagiola
- Radio: NBC
- Radio announcers: Blaine Walsh and Ernie Harwell

The second 1961 Major League Baseball All-Star Game was played in Fenway Park in Boston on July 31, 1961. It was the first MLB All-Star Game to end in a tie. The game in 2002 also ended in a tie.

Rocky Colavito's one-out home run in the bottom of the first off National League starter Bob Purkey gave the American League a 1–0 lead, but Purkey only allowed two walks in the second before Art Mahaffey pitched a scoreless third and fourth, allowing only a leadoff walk to Mickey Mantle in the fourth. The Americans only got three more hits versus Sandy Koufax and Stu Miller.

American starter Jim Bunning pitched three perfect innings, but Don Schwall allowed a bases-loaded single to Bill White that tied the game in the sixth. All five hits the Nationals got were charged to Schwall. Camilo Pascual pitched three shutout innings before the game was called due to rain after nine innings with the score 1–1.

This was the first of two all-star games in 1961. From 1959 to 1962, two such were held each season to increase the money going to the players' pension fund. This practice ended after the owners agreed to give the players a larger share of the income from a single game.

== Rosters ==
Players in italics have since been inducted into the National Baseball Hall of Fame.

=== National League ===
Starters
Position	Player	Team	All-Star Games
P	Bob Purkey	Reds	3
C	Smoky Burgess	Pirates	8
1B	Bill White	Cardinals	5
2B	Frank Bolling	Braves	2
3B	Eddie Mathews	Braves	11
SS	Maury Wills	Dodgers	2
OF	Orlando Cepeda	Giants	6
OF	Roberto Clemente	Pirates	4
OF	Willie Mays	Giants	11

Pitchers
Position	Player	Team	All-Star Games
P	Don Drysdale	Dodgers	3
P	Roy Face	Pirates	6
P	Joey Jay	Reds	2
P	Sandy Koufax	Dodgers	2
P	Art Mahaffey	Phillies	2
P	Mike McCormick	Giants	4
P	Stu Miller	Giants	2
P	Warren Spahn	Braves	14

Reserves
Position	Player	Team	All-Star Games
C	Ed Bailey	Giants	5
C	John Roseboro	Dodgers	3
1B	Dick Stuart	Pirates	2
2B	Don Zimmer	Cubs	2
3B	Ken Boyer	Cardinals	7
SS	Ernie Banks	Cubs	9
SS	Eddie Kasko	Reds	2
OF	Hank Aaron	Braves	10
OF	George Altman	Cubs	2
OF	Stan Musial	Cardinals	21
OF	Frank Robinson	Reds	6

=== American League ===
Starters
Position	Player	Team	All-Star Games
P	Jim Bunning	Tigers	4
C	Johnny Romano	Indians	2
1B	Norm Cash	Tigers	2
2B	Johnny Temple	Indians	6
3B	Brooks Robinson	Orioles	4
SS	Luis Aparicio	White Sox	6
OF	Rocky Colavito	Tigers	4
OF	Mickey Mantle	Yankees	13
OF	Al Kaline	Tigers	10

Pitchers
Position	Player	Team	All-Star Games
P	Luis Arroyo	Yankees	2
P	Dick Donovan	Senators	3
P	Whitey Ford	Yankees	9
P	Barry Latman	Indians	1
P	Ken McBride	Angels	1
P	Camilo Pascual	Twins	4
P	Don Schwall	Red Sox	1
P	Hoyt Wilhelm	Orioles	5

Reserves
Position	Player	Team	All-Star Games
C	Elston Howard	Yankees	7
1B	Jim Gentile	Orioles	4
1B	Harmon Killebrew	Twins	4
1B	Roy Sievers	White Sox	5
1B	Bill Skowron	Yankees	6
2B	Nellie Fox	White Sox	14
SS	Dick Howser	Athletics	2
SS	Tony Kubek	Yankees	4
OF	Yogi Berra	Yankees	17
OF	Jackie Brandt	Orioles	2
OF	Roger Maris	Yankees	5

== Game ==
Umpires: Larry Napp, Home Plate (AL); Frank Secory, First Base (NL); Red Flaherty, Second Base (AL); Ed Sudol, Third Base (NL); Al Smith, Left Field (AL); Chris Pelekoudas, Right Field (NL)

=== Starting lineups ===
National League				American League			
Order	Player	Team	Position	Order	Player	Team	Position
1	Maury Wills	Dodgers	SS	1	Norm Cash	Tigers	1B
2	Eddie Mathews	Braves	3B	2	Rocky Colavito	Tigers	OF
3	Willie Mays	Giants	OF	3	Al Kaline	Tigers	OF
4	Orlando Cepeda	Giants	OF	4	Mickey Mantle	Yankees	OF
5	Roberto Clemente	Pirates	OF	5	Johnny Romano	Indians	C
6	Bill White	Cardinals	1B	6	Luis Aparicio	White Sox	SS
7	Frank Bolling	Braves	2B	7	Johnny Temple	Indians	2B
8	Smoky Burgess	Pirates	C	8	Brooks Robinson	Orioles	3B
9	Bob Purkey	Reds	P	9	Jim Bunning	Tigers	P

=== Game summary ===
Monday, July 31, 1961 2:00 pm (ET) at Fenway Park in Boston, Massachusetts
Team	1	2	3	4	5	6	7	8	9	R	H	E
National League	0	0	0	0	0	1	0	0	0	1	5	1
American League	1	0	0	0	0	0	0	0	0	1	4	0
WP: None LP: None; Home runs: NL: None; AL: Rocky Colavito (1)

== Sources ==
- "All-Star Results – 1961: Game 31, July 31, 1961", MLB.com
- July 31, 1961 All-Star Game Play-By-Play and Box Score, Baseball-Reference.com
