= Billy Hoeft =

American baseball player (1932–2010)

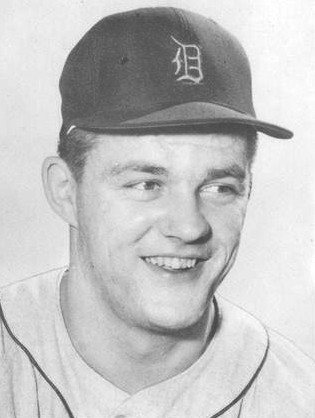
- Hoeft with the Tigers
- Pitcher
- Born: May 17, 1932; Oshkosh, Wisconsin, U.S.
- Died: March 16, 2010 (aged 77); Canadian Lakes, Michigan, U.S.
- Batted: Left Threw: Left

MLB debut
- April 18, 1952, for the Detroit Tigers

Last MLB appearance
- September 25, 1966, for the San Francisco Giants

MLB statistics
- Win–loss record: 97–101
- Earned run average: 3.94
- Strikeouts: 1,140
- Stats at Baseball Reference

Teams
- Detroit Tigers (1952–1959); Boston Red Sox (1959); Baltimore Orioles (1959–1962); San Francisco Giants (1963); Milwaukee Braves (1964); Chicago Cubs (1965–1966); San Francisco Giants (1966)

Career highlights and awards
- All-Star (1955)

William Frederick Hoeft (/hɛft/ HEFT; May 17, 1932 – March 16, 2010) was an American pitcher in Major League Baseball (MLB) whose career spanned 15 seasons with the Detroit Tigers, Boston Red Sox, Baltimore Orioles, Milwaukee Braves, Chicago Cubs and San Francisco Giants. Born in Oshkosh, Wisconsin, Hoeft threw and batted left-handed, stood 6 feet 3 inches (1.91 m) tall and weighed 180 pounds (82 kg).

== Early life ==
Hoeft was born on May 17, 1932, in Oshkosh, Wisconsin. He played baseball at Oshkosh High School and for American Legion teams. In a 1949 American Legion game he struck out all 27 batters that he faced. One of his high school teammates was Dutch Rennert, a future major league baseball umpire. Area press observed he put Oshkosh baseball "on the map", and when major league scouts came to see Hoeft, they would also sign other local players. As a high school pitcher, his team won a state championship and he won over thirty games in a row, with three no-hitters.

== Detroit Tigers (1952–1959) ==
Hoeft was signed by the Detroit Tigers out of high school as an amateur free agent in 1950. MLB had adopted rules in the 1940s and 1950s, in effect at the time Hoeft signed, that limited a team's ability to place players receiving a signing bonus in its minor league system. This prevented wealthier teams from hoarding the most talented players or losing the rights to the player; but it also could affect the player's ability to develop their skills in the minor leagues if they were not ready to play in the major leagues. Hoeft intentionally decided not to sign for a bonus, believing the bonus rules would inhibit his development, and found the most suitable non-bonus offer and circumstances with the Tigers.

In 1950, he was assigned to the Class-D Richmond Tigers, where he had a 10–1 win-loss record, and 1.71 earned run average (ERA). In 1951, he was promoted to the Triple-A Toledo Mud Hens, where he went 9–14, with a 5.43 ERA. This did not stop him from being called up to the Tigers in 1952.

He made his major league debut on April 18, 1952, for the Tigers, pitching two innings as a relief pitcher. Hoeft went on to pitch seven full seasons in Detroit.

On September 7, 1953, Hoeft became the eighth pitcher in major-league history to pitch an immaculate inning, striking out all three batters on nine total pitches in the seventh inning of a game against the Chicago White Sox; it was the first time the feat had been accomplished since 1928. On June 24, 1955, Hoeft surrendered the first home run in the career of Harmon Killebrew, who would eventually hit 573 home runs in his career.

In 1955, Hoeft had a 16–7 record and a 2.99 ERA. He led all MLB pitchers in shutouts with seven. He was third in the AL in winning percentage (.696) and WHIP (walks plus hits per innings pitched), sixth in WAR (wins above replacement), ERA and wins, and fifth in strikeouts per nine innings while sixth in fewest walks per nine innings. Hoeft was selected to the American League squad in the 1955 MLB All-Star Game, although he was not called upon to pitch in the game.

His best season came in 1956 (the same year he met his wife) when he won 20 games and pitched 18 complete games. Toward the end of the season, Hoeft had a 19–10 record, but lost four close games as a starter, keeping him from a 20th win. His manager, Bucky Harris, engineered a relief pitching appearance for Hoeft in the fifth inning of the season's penultimate game, that allowed Hoeft to achieve 20 victories.

In 1957-58, he had a combined record of 19–20 for the Tigers, and fell out of favor with his managers. He would be traded early the next season, even though he was one of only two pitchers on the team who had won a game in 1959 before the trade. Hoeft had great promise in his early days with the Tigers and finally peaked in 1955-56, but the team was down on him in his last two years for his easygoing nature and light-hearted antics, as well as a decrease in pitching velocity and possible sore arm. In early May 1959, Hoeft was dealt to the Boston Red Sox for Dave Sisler and Ted Lepcio.

In a little over seven seasons with the Tigers, Hoeft was primarily used as a starting pitcher, starting in 176 games out of 239, with an overall record of 74–78, with 11 saves and 4.02 ERA during his time there. Hoeft also showed occasional potential as a power hitter, once tying an American League record for consecutive home runs by a pitcher with two to begin a game.

== Boston Red Sox and Baltimore Orioles (1959–1962) ==
Hoeft was the losing pitcher in three of his five appearances for Boston and was traded to Baltimore for Jack Harshman after a little more than a month after coming from Detroit.

Hoeft remained in Baltimore through the 1962 season, where he was primarily used as a relief pitcher, although he did start 19 games out of 127 for the Orioles. During the 1961 season, Hoeft posted a career-best ERA of 2.02 in 12 starts and 23 relief appearances, with a 7–4 record, one shutout and three saves. Hoeft only pitched 138 innings, which did not qualify him for the league ERA lead, but his ERA was nearly 40 points lower than the AL leader that year, Dick Donovan (2.40).

== San Francisco, Milwaukee and Chicago (1963–1966) ==
Hoeft was traded along with Jack Fisher and Jimmie Coker from the Orioles to the Giants for Stu Miller, John Orsino and Mike McCormick on December 15, 1962.

In 23 appearances for San Francisco during the 1963 season, Hoeft saved four games and posted a 4.44 ERA in 24.1 innings pitched. After the season ended, he was dealt to the Milwaukee Braves, along with Felipe Alou, Ed Bailey and a player to be named later for Del Crandall, Bob Shaw and Bob Hendley. San Francisco ended up sending Ernie Bowman to Milwaukee to complete the deal.

In Milwaukee, Hoeft appeared in 42 games posting a 3.80 ERA in 73.1 innings pitched, and saving four games to go along with a 4–0 record.

After the 1964 season, Hoeft entered free agency, and was re-signed by his original team, the Detroit Tigers. He was released during spring training for the 1965 season. Shortly afterward, the Chicago Cubs signed Hoeft to a contract for the 1965 season, where he posted an ERA of 2.81 in two starts and 29 appearances for the Cubs, with a 2–2 record and one save.

Hoeft's last season in Major League Baseball was 1966, as he appeared in 36 games for the Cubs, before being released in August. In August, he was signed by the San Francisco Giants initially as a coach and batting practice pitcher before being activated in September when playing rosters increased to 40 men. He pitched only 3.2 innings, and posted a 0–2 win–loss record in four games pitched during his second tour with the Giants, before announcing his retirement at the end of the 1966 season.

Hoeft often entered games as a pinch runner, he had a career .202 batting average (107-for-531) with 73 runs, 18 doubles, 3 home runs, 47 RBI and 67 bases on balls. During his career, he struck out Hall of Fame New York Yankee Mickey Mantle 24 times; though he also gave up an historically long home run to Mantle at Briggs Stadium in 1956.

== Death ==
Hoeft died from cancer in Canadian Lakes, Michigan, at the age of 77.
