= Jimmy Dudley =

American sportscaster (1909–1999)

Dudley

James Randolph Dudley (September 27, 1909 – February 12, 1999) was an American sportscaster, best known as the radio play-by-play voice of Major League Baseball's Cleveland Indians for nearly two decades.

== Biography ==
A native of Alexandria, Virginia, Dudley majored in chemistry at the University of Virginia. He turned to broadcasting in the late 1930s, starting out at a Charlottesville radio station. He moved up to calling Pittsburgh Pirates games in 1937 and Chicago Cubs and Chicago White Sox games from 1938–1941 before serving as a pilot in the U.S. Army Air Forces during World War II.

Dudley was the Indians' lead radio announcer from 1948 until his dismissal by the club in January 1968. In 1969, Dudley broadcast for the expansion Seattle Pilots; when the club moved to Milwaukee and became the Brewers the following year, he did not join them. Dudley broadcast for a number of minor league teams in the 1970s before retiring. As an announcer, Dudley was known for his friendly, homespun style and his signature catchphrases: "Hello, baseball fans everywhere" (to start a broadcast), "The string is out" (describing a full count on a hitter), "A swing and a miss, he struck him out," "That ball is going...going...gone!" (to describe a home run), "Mighty close, mistah ump!" (describing an umpire call that he found questionable) and "So long and lots of good luck, you hear?" (signing off at the game's end – "you hear" sounded more like "ya he-ah?" in Dudley's vocal inflection).

Dudley was also a popular advertising pitchman in Cleveland, remembered primarily for his radio and television commercials for the Aluminum Siding Corporation (Garfield 1–2323) and Kahn's Hot Dogs – "the wien-ah the world awaited," in Dudley's unique parlance.

Dudley called the 1954 World Series and All-Star Game for the Mutual network, and 1961's first All-Star Game for NBC Radio.

In addition to baseball, Dudley also broadcast football at various times for the Ohio State University, the University of Washington, and the NFL's Cleveland Browns, Detroit Lions and Baltimore Colts.

Dudley was presented with the Ford C. Frick Award from the Baseball Hall of Fame in 1997. He died at age 89 in Tucson, Arizona.
