= Jackie Brandt =

American baseball player (born 1934)

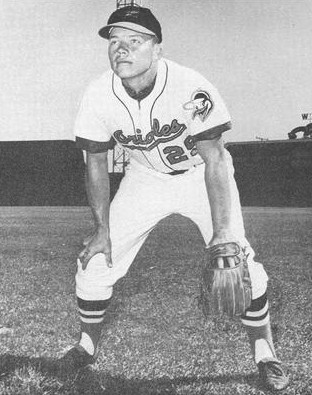
- Outfielder
- Born: April 28, 1934 (age 92); Omaha, Nebraska, U.S.
- Batted: Right Threw: Right

MLB debut
- April 21, 1956, for the St. Louis Cardinals

Last MLB appearance
- September 2, 1967, for the Houston Astros

MLB statistics
- Batting average: .262
- Home runs: 112
- Runs batted in: 485
- Stats at Baseball Reference

Teams
- St. Louis Cardinals (1956); New York / San Francisco Giants (1956–1959); Baltimore Orioles (1960–1965); Philadelphia Phillies (1966–1967); Houston Astros (1967)

Career highlights and awards
- 2× All-Star (1961, 1961²); Gold Glove Award (1959)

John George Brandt Jr. (born April 28, 1934) is an American former professional baseball outfielder, who played in the major leagues for the St. Louis Cardinals (1956), New York / San Francisco Giants (1956–1959), Baltimore Orioles (1960–1965), Philadelphia Phillies (1966–1967), and Houston Astros (1967). Born in Omaha, Nebraska, where he attended Omaha Benson High School, he threw and batted right-handed, stood 5 feet 11 inches (1.80 m) tall and weighed 165 pounds (75 kg). He was originally signed by the Cardinals as an amateur free agent before the 1953 season.

Brandt made his big league debut on April 21, 1956, against the Milwaukee Braves at Sportsman's Park, then was traded to the New York Giants almost two months later. In a noteworthy rookie season, he posted a .298 batting average, 125 games played, 12 home runs, and 50 runs batted in. In 1959, he won a Gold Glove for his play as the San Francisco Giants' regular left fielder, then was traded to Baltimore, where he would have his most productive years.

Brandt's best season was 1961, when he was named to the American League All-Star team. He finished ninth in the American League batting race, with a .297 batting average, and he had several career highs, including 153 hits, 516 at bats, 73 runs batted in, 93 runs scored, and a .371 on-base percentage. The Orioles had a great year, winning 95 games and losing only 67.

One of Brandt's most memorable games took place at Baltimore Memorial Stadium, on September 12, 1964. He drove in the only run in a rare battle of complete game one-hitters between Orioles left-hander Frank Bertaina and Kansas City Athletics southpaw Bob Meyer. Teammate Bob Saverine entered the 0–0 game in the bottom of the 8th inning, as a pinch runner for John Orsino, who had doubled. Saverine advanced to third on a Bertaina sacrifice bunt, then scored when Brandt hit a sacrifice fly to right field.

Brandt was traded with Darold Knowles from the Orioles to the Phillies for Jack Baldschun on December 6, 1965. As a Phillie, he was the last player to bat against Sandy Koufax during a regular-season game, striking out for the final out of the 1966 regular season finale.

Brandt career statistics included 1,221 games, 1,020 hits, 112 home runs, 485 runs batted in, 540 runs, a .262 batting average, and a .412 slugging percentage.
