= Buster Narum =

American baseball player (1940-2004)

- Pitcher
- Born: November 16, 1940; Philadelphia, Pennsylvania, U.S.
- Died: May 17, 2004 (aged 63); Clearwater, Florida, U.S.
- Batted: Right Threw: Right

MLB debut
- April 14, 1963, for the Baltimore Orioles

Last MLB appearance
- September 26, 1967, for the Washington Senators

MLB statistics
- Win–loss record: 14–27
- Earned run average: 4.45
- Strikeouts: 220
- Stats at Baseball Reference

Teams
- Baltimore Orioles (1963); Washington Senators (1964–1967)

Leslie Ferdinand "Buster" Narum (November 16, 1940 – May 17, 2004) was an American professional baseball player. Listed as 6 feet 1 inch (1.85 m) tall and 194 pounds (88 kg), he was a right-handed starting pitcher in Major League Baseball for the Baltimore Orioles (1963) and Washington Senators (1964–1967).

Born in Philadelphia, Narum graduated from high school in Clearwater, Florida. He signed with Baltimore at age 17 in 1958 and debuted with the Orioles early in the 1963 season, finishing with no decisions in nine innings of work. The next year, he was sent to the Senators in the same trade that brought Lou Piniella to Baltimore. On May 3, 1963, Narum became the first-ever Orioles player to hit a home run in his first Major League at-bat, connecting off Don Mossi of the Detroit Tigers in an 8–5 Baltimore triumph.

Narum had a career batting average of .059 (7-for-118), though three of his seven lifetime hits were home runs.

In 96 career games, Narum compiled a 14–27 record, with 220 strikeouts, a 4.45 ERA, tossed two shutouts, and pitched nine complete games in 396 innings pitched. He allowed 398 hits and 177 bases on balls.

Buster Narum died in Clearwater at the age of 63.

== See also ==
- Home run in first Major League at-bat
