= Jack Fisher =

American baseball player (born 1939)

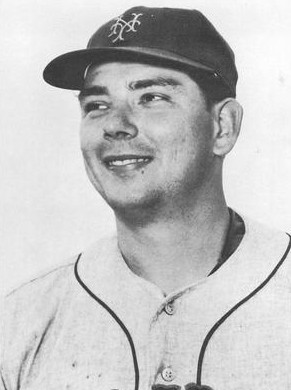
- Pitcher
- Born: March 4, 1939 (age 87); Frostburg, Maryland, U.S.
- Batted: Right Threw: Right

MLB debut
- April 14, 1959, for the Baltimore Orioles

Last MLB appearance
- September 26, 1969, for the Cincinnati Reds

MLB statistics
- Win–loss record: 86–139
- Earned run average: 4.06
- Strikeouts: 1,017
- Stats at Baseball Reference

Teams
- Baltimore Orioles (1959–1962); San Francisco Giants (1963); New York Mets (1964–1967); Chicago White Sox (1968); Cincinnati Reds (1969)

John Howard "Fat Jack" Fisher (born March 4, 1939) is an American former professional baseball player. He played in Major League Baseball as a right-handed pitcher from 1959 through 1969 for the Baltimore Orioles, San Francisco Giants, New York Mets, Chicago White Sox and the Cincinnati Reds. Fisher was a member of the 1960s Baltimore Orioles Kiddie Korps.

== Baseball career ==
Fisher was born in Frostburg, Maryland. He attended high school at Richmond Academy in Augusta, Georgia, graduating in 1957. He then enrolled in the University of Georgia. He was used primarily as a starting pitcher during his 11-year MLB career. He is known for giving up a few historic home runs. One was Ted Williams's 521st in his final major league at bat (September 28, 1960). Another was Roger Maris's 60th home run of the 1961 season (September 26, 1961). Also, he gave up the first home run in Shea Stadium history, to Willie Stargell (April 17, 1964).

Fisher made his major league debut in relief on April 14, 1959 against the New York Yankees at Memorial Stadium. He pitched three innings in the 13–3 loss, giving up seven hits, two walks, four runs (two earned), and striking out five. His first strikeout victim was All-Star catcher Elston Howard, the second batter he faced.

Fisher's best season was 1960, when he had his only winning record (12–11) and was tied for fourth in the American League with three shutouts. From August 24 to September 14 he pitched 29.2 consecutive scoreless innings and ended the year with a 3.41 earned run average, one of his lowest.

He was traded along with Billy Hoeft and Jimmie Coker from the Orioles to the Giants for Stu Miller, John Orsino and Mike McCormick on December 15, 1962.

Fisher's busiest seasons were with the early New York Mets. In four seasons (1964–1967) with the perennial losers he won 38 games, lost 73, and had an ERA of 4.58 in 931.2 innings pitched. (The Mets played .355 ball during this time.) Fisher led the National League twice in losses (1965 and 1967) and three times in earned runs allowed (1964, 1965, and 1967). In 1965 he lost 24 games, still tied with Roger Craig for the most since 1935. In 1967, however, Fisher pitched the lowest-hit complete game of his career, a two-hit shutout over the Philadelphia Phillies (June 21 at Connie Mack Stadium).

The home starting pitcher in the first game ever at Shea Stadium, Fisher received the honor of throwing the stadium's first official pitch in 1964. Overwhelmed by the crowd noise and pre-game pomp, Fisher recounts that he asked Mets manager Casey Stengel if he could warm up in the bullpen rather than on the field's pitcher's mound, and credits himself with starting that day the big league custom of starting pitchers warming up in the bullpen before the game.

Pitching for the White Sox in 1968, Fisher had a record of 8–13 with a 2.99 ERA, the lowest of his career. In 1969 he was 4–4 with Cincinnati and was traded to the California Angels in the off-season. He was released by the Angels on April 7, 1970 (Opening Day), and his big league career was over at the age of 31.

Tommy John described Fisher as "a good, not great, journeyman pitcher...He could give you 200 to 250 innings, and pitch around .500 ball."

== Career statistics ==
In an eleven-season major league career, Fisher posted an 86–139 record with 1,017 strikeouts and a 4.06 ERA in 1,975.2 innings pitched, including 9 shutouts and 62 complete games. He had a batting average of .125 in 594 at bats with one home run, hit against Bobby Locke of the Cleveland Indians on August 7, 1960.

== Later life ==
Following his retirement from baseball, Fisher settled in Easton, Pennsylvania, where he lives five blocks from former world heavyweight boxing champion Larry Holmes. He once owned Fat Jack's, an Easton sports bar he sold in 1998. Fisher was inducted into the Richmond Academy (his high school) Hall of Fame in October 2017. ARC won seven consecutive state championships from 1951 to 1957. Fisher played on four of those teams. Jack Fisher Way on the school's campus is named for him.

== Sources ==
- 1968 Baseball Register published by The Sporting News
