= Stu Miller =

American baseball player (1927–2015)

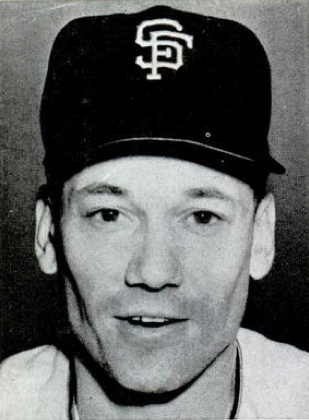
- Pitcher
- Born: December 26, 1927; Northampton, Massachusetts, U.S.
- Died: January 4, 2015 (aged 87); Cameron Park, California, U.S.
- Batted: Right Threw: Right

MLB debut
- August 12, 1952, for the St. Louis Cardinals

Last MLB appearance
- April 23, 1968, for the Atlanta Braves

MLB statistics
- Win–loss record: 105–103
- Earned run average: 3.24
- Strikeouts: 1,164
- Saves: 154
- Stats at Baseball Reference

Teams
- St. Louis Cardinals (1952–1954, 1956); Philadelphia Phillies (1956); New York / San Francisco Giants (1957–1962); Baltimore Orioles (1963–1967); Atlanta Braves (1968)

Career highlights and awards
- 2× All-Star (1961, 1961²); World Series champion (1966); NL ERA leader (1958); Pitched combined no-hitter on April 30, 1967; San Francisco Giants Wall of Fame; Baltimore Orioles Hall of Fame

Stuart Leonard Miller (December 26, 1927 – January 4, 2015), nicknamed "the Butterfly Man", was an American pitcher in Major League Baseball who played for the St. Louis Cardinals (1952–56), Philadelphia Phillies (1956), New York/San Francisco Giants (1957–62), Baltimore Orioles (1963–67) and Atlanta Braves (1968). He batted and threw right-handed. In a 16-season career, Miller posted a 105–103 record with a 3.24 earned run average, 1164 strikeouts, and 154 saves in 704 games pitched (93 as a starter).

== Early life ==
Miller was born on December 26, 1927, in Northampton, Massachusetts. He did not participate in high school sports, but played for local baseball and basketball teams. He served in the Navy, returning to Northampton in 1949. In 1949, he attended a St. Louis Cardinals tryout held in Northampton, and was signed by Cardinals' scout Joe Cusick.

== Playing career ==
=== Minor leagues ===
Miller was assigned to the Class-D Salisbury Cardinals in 1949, where he had an 8–13 won–loss record with a 4.29 earned run average (ERA) as a starter. He played Class-D baseball again in 1950, with an improved 16–13 record, in 244 innings pitched with 3.21 ERA. He spent 1951 playing Class-B and Single-A baseball in the Cardinals minor league system.

He began the 1952 season with the Triple-A Columbus Red Birds, going 11–5, with a 2.34 ERA, throwing four shutouts in 13 starts.

=== Major leagues ===
==== St. Louis Cardinals ====
In August 1952, Miller was called up by the Cardinals. He had a 6–3 record, 2.05 ERA and two shutouts in 11 starts, striking out 64 batters in 88 innings pitched with only 26 bases on balls. He regressed in 1953 with the Cardinals, with a 5.56 ERA, with over half of his appearances coming as a relief pitcher. He split the 1954 season between Columbus (where he was mostly a starting pitcher) and the Cardinals (where he pitched the vast majority of his games in relief).

He spent all of 1955 with the Cardinals new Triple-A affiliate the Omaha Cardinals, going 17–14 with a 3.02 ERA as a starter. Miller pitched in only three games for the Cardinals in 1956, when he was traded to the Philadelphia Phillies in early May with Harvey Haddix and Ben Flowers for Murry Dickson and Herm Wehmeier.

==== New York/San Francisco Giants ====
Miller finished out the 1956 season with the Phillies, still pitching the majority of his games as a starter. After the season ended, the Phillies traded Miller to the New York Giants for Jim Hearn. He split the 1957 season between the Giants and their Triple-A affiliate the Minneapolis Millers. He was used solely as a starter in Minneapolis, going 3–3 with a 2.29 ERA; but with the Giants, he started only 13 of the 38 games in which he appeared, with a 7–9 record and 3.63 ERA. At 29 years old, this would be his last year in the minor leagues until the end of his career.

In 1958, with the Giants now in San Francisco, Miller started 20 of 41 games he appeared in, with a 6–9 record and 2.47 ERA. His ERA led the National League. In 1959, he appeared in 50 games as a relief pitcher, with only 9 starts, with a 8–7 record, eight saves and 2.84 ERA. In 1960 he started only three of 47 games in which he appeared, which would be the last starts of his career.

At age 33 in 1961, Miller was now solely a relief pitcher. He had a 14–5 record, with a 2.66 ERA and 17 saves. His 17 saves tied Roy Face for the National League lead. Miller was named an All-Star for the Giants in 1961, and played in both All-Star games that year. He was the winning pitcher in the July 11 All-Star game, defeating Hall of Fame reliever Hoyt Wilhelm. He pitched the final three innings of the July 31 All-Star game, with five strikeouts, the game ending in a tie. Manager Alvin Dark thought Miller's 1961 season was the best of any relief pitcher who ever played for Dark. "It got so the starters would work seven innings and look to the bullpen expecting to see him running in." The Sporting News named Miller the National League's Fireman of the Year. Miller was 12th in NL most valuable player voting that year. In September, the Giants held a Stu Miller Night.

==== 1961 All star game ====
He was involved in one of the more memorable moments in All Star Game history, albeit for an exaggeration of the event in question. In the ninth inning of the first of two 1961 All Star Games (two were played between 1959 and 1962), which was played at Candlestick Park, a gust of wind caused Miller to sway slightly, resulting in a balk, which advanced Roger Maris to second and Al Kaline to third. In the embellished version, it is reported that the wind gust blew the 165-pound Miller off the pitcher's mound.

Kaline later scored on an error by Ken Boyer on Rocky Colavito's ground ball, which tied the score at 3–3. One batter later, the wind caused catcher Smoky Burgess to drop Tony Kubek's foul pop-up for an error. Miller bailed Burgess out by striking out Kubek, and after Yogi Berra reached base on Don Zimmer's error, Miller got Hoyt Wilhelm to fly out to left to end the inning. In the top of the 10th inning, the defense behind Miller almost did him in; Nellie Fox walked and scored all the way from first on Boyer's three-base throwing error (the second by Boyer in as many innings) on Kaline's ground ball. Miller's teammates bailed him out in the bottom of the inning and made him the winning pitcher; Hank Aaron singled and scored on a double by Miller's Giant teammate Willie Mays to tie the score, then Mays scored the winning run on Roberto Clemente's single.

In 1962, although the Giants went to the World Series, Miller had his highest ERA since 1956, posting a 4.12 mark in 59 games (107 innings pitched), going 5–8 with 19 saves. He pitched in two games in the World Series, going 1.1 innings with one hit, two bases on balls and no runs allowed. Thinking he was washed up, the Giants traded him along with John Orsino and Mike McCormick to the Baltimore Orioles for Jack Fisher, Billy Hoeft and Jimmie Coker on December 15, 1962.

==== Baltimore Orioles ====
He responded with a strong 1963 season in which the Associated Press reported, "Little Stuart has never been better." His record on the year was only 5–8, identical to his numbers from a season ago, but Miller led the American League (AL) and all major league pitchers in games (71), games finished (59), and saves (27) now serving as the Oriole closer; his ERA was 2.24, lowest since his rookie season. He and Leon Wagner were tied for 19th in AL MVP voting after the season. The Sporting News named him the AL Fireman of the Year, joining Lindy McDaniel as the first players to win the award twice; and becoming the first player to win it in both leagues.

In 1964, the Orioles were in a pennant race with the New York Yankees and Chicago White Sox, ultimately finishing 97–65, two games behind the pennant winning Yankees. Miller pitched 66 games in relief (5th in the AL) with 22 saves (3rd in the league) and a 3.06 ERA. Miller finished seventh in MVP voting in 1965, a year in which he had a 14–7 record and 24 saves (tied for 2nd in the AL) in 67 appearances (5th in the AL). His 1.89 ERA that season was the Orioles record for pitchers who worked at least 100 innings in a season until it was surpassed by Trevor Rogers' 1.81 in 2025.

In 1966, the 38-year-old Miller was a key pitcher for the world champion Orioles. He pitched in relief in 51 games, with a 9-4 record, 18 saves, and a 2.25 ERA over 92 innings. Miller did not appear in the World Series, a 4–0 Orioles sweep, as their starting pitchers completed Games 2-4, and Moe Drabowsky was the only reliever needed in Game 1.

On April 30, 1967, Steve Barber and Miller combined to pitch a no-hitter for the Orioles against the Detroit Tigers, but would lose 2–1. Miller entered after Barber, who walked ten batters, gave up the tying run on a wild pitch with two outs. A ground ball to shortstop Luis Aparicio should have ended it for Miller, but when Aparicio threw the ball to second baseman Mark Belanger, Belanger misplayed it, his error allowing the winning run to score. Ironically, Belanger, who went on to replace Aparicio as the Orioles' shortstop, is considered one of baseball's greatest defensive players with the second highest Defensive WAR (wins above replacement) of any player in baseball history.

On May 14, 1967, he gave up Mickey Mantle's 500th career home run.

=== Pitching style ===
Miller's "Butterfly Man" nickname came around as a result of his ability to fool hitters with a slow curveball. He was also known as "Mr. Shoulders" and "Mr. Head" because of his deceptive body motions. Manager and former all-star catcher Birdie Tebbetts attributed Miller's success to being the slowest of all slow-ball pitchers.

His fastball only topped out in the 80-mph range, but Miller relied on a deceptive delivery to get batters out. "He was the epitome of an off-speed pitcher, but he could get people out," teammate Eddie Watt said of Miller. "He had just tremendous deception and no fear at all." According to Miller, a catcher told him he could catch his pitches with pliers. "Really, my fastball was in the mid-80s, at most, and the changeup was a good 8 mph less. But both pitches looked the same, which was the secret to my deception," Miller said.

== Legacy and honors ==
Miller was among the top relief pitchers of his era, and is a member of the Giants Wall of Fame and Orioles Hall of Fame. Miller was named the Sporting News Reliever of the Year in 1961 and 1963.

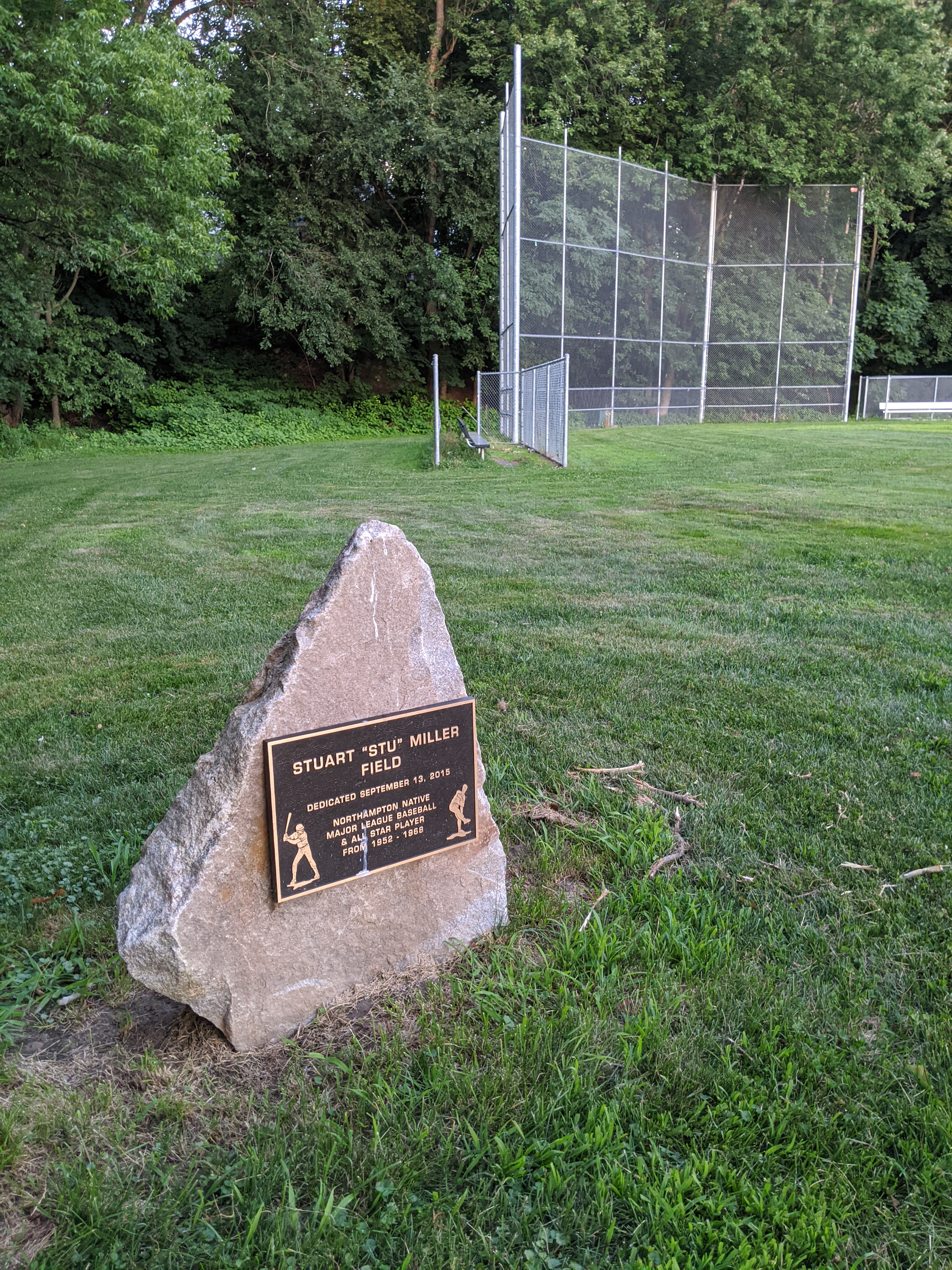
Stu Miller Field in Northampton, Massachusetts

Over 16 major league seasons, Miller had a 105–103 record with 153 saves and a lifetime ERA of 3.24. He started 93 of the 704 games in which he appeared, and averaged 6.2 strikeouts per nine innings and 3.2 bases on balls per nine innings.

Hall of Fame Oriole pitcher Jim Palmer credited Miller for helping him become a better pitcher. "I learned from guys like Stu Miller. I sat out in the bullpen with him when I was nineteen and watched and listened. It was like graduate school." Baseball Hall of Famer Harmon Killebrew said Miller was the most difficult pitcher he ever faced.

In September 2015, Veterans Field in Northampton, Massachusetts was dedicated as Stu Miller Baseball Field.

== Death ==
Miller died January 4, 2015, at his home in Cameron Park, California, aged 87 after a brief illness.

== See also ==
- List of Major League Baseball annual ERA leaders
- List of Major League Baseball annual saves leaders

Preceded by Lindy McDaniel	Sporting News National League Reliever of the Year; 1961	Succeeded by Roy Face
Preceded by Sonny Siebert	No-hit game April 30, 1967 with Steve Barber	Succeeded by Don Wilson
