= Jimmie Coker =

American baseball player (1936–1991)

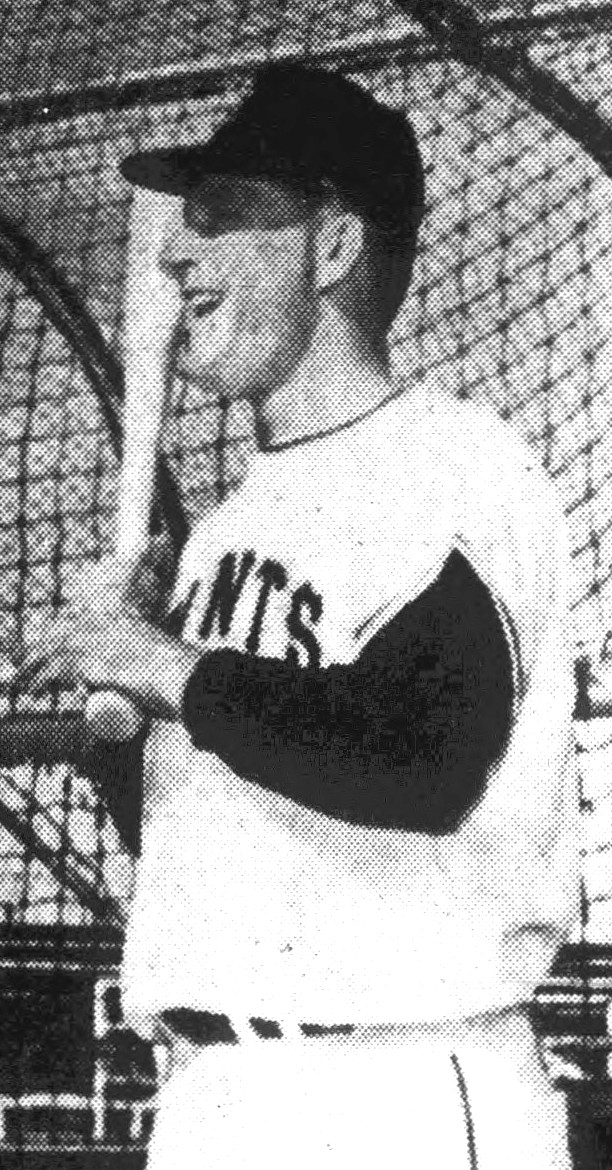
- Coker, circa 1963
- Catcher
- Born: March 28, 1936; Holly Hill, South Carolina, U.S.
- Died: October 29, 1991 (aged 55); Throckmorton, Texas, U.S.
- Batted: Right Threw: Right

MLB debut
- September 11, 1958, for the Philadelphia Phillies

Last MLB appearance
- September 12, 1967, for the Cincinnati Reds

MLB statistics
- Batting average: .231
- Home runs: 16
- Runs batted in: 70
- Stats at Baseball Reference

Teams
- Philadelphia Phillies (1958, 1960–1962); San Francisco Giants (1963); Cincinnati Reds (1964–1967)

Jimmie Goodwin Coker (March 28, 1936 – October 29, 1991) was an American professional baseball catcher, who played in Major League Baseball (MLB) for the Philadelphia Phillies (1958, 1960–1962), San Francisco Giants (1963), and Cincinnati Reds (1964–1967).

A native of Holly Hill, South Carolina, Coker was the son of David and Leola Coker. He played football and basketball for Furman University in Greenville, South Carolina, before signing as an amateur free agent in February 1955, with the Phillies. Coker spent all or parts of nine years in the National League (NL).

Coker made his big league debut, at age 22, on September 11, 1958, as the Phillies’ starting catcher, batting eighth, in Philadelphia’s 4–3 win over the Los Angeles Dodgers, at Connie Mack Stadium. In his second at-bat of the game, in the fifth inning, he singled for his first career hit, off Johnny Podres.

During most of the 1962 season Coker served in the U.S. Military. After playing four seasons with the Phillies, his contract was purchased by the Baltimore Orioles. He was traded along with Jack Fisher and Billy Hoeft from the Orioles to the Giants for Stu Miller, John Orsino and Mike McCormick on December 15, 1962. Coker played one season with the Giants. In August 1964, the Reds purchased his contract from the Milwaukee Braves, where he played parts of his last four seasons. Coker made his last MLB start, on August 26, 1967; two days later Baseball Hall of Famer Johnny Bench made his Reds' debut.

In all, Coker played in 233 games, had 592 at bats, 137 hits, 16 home runs, 70 runs batted in, and a .231 batting average.

After baseball, Coker was a rancher in Texas, where he was on the board of directors of the Texas and Southwestern Cattle Raisers Association, in Throckmorton, Texas, where he died from a heart attack, on October 29, 1991, at age 55.
