= Charley Lau =

American baseball player (1933–1984)

- Catcher
- Born: April 12, 1933; Romulus, Michigan, U.S.
- Died: March 18, 1984 (aged 50); Key Colony Beach, Florida, U.S.
- Batted: Left Threw: Right

MLB debut
- September 12, 1956, for the Detroit Tigers

Last MLB appearance
- September 29, 1967, for the Atlanta Braves

MLB statistics
- Batting average: .255
- Home runs: 16
- Runs batted in: 140
- Stats at Baseball Reference

Teams
- As player: Detroit Tigers (1956, 1958–1959); Milwaukee / Atlanta Braves (1960–1961, 1967); Baltimore Orioles (1961–1963, 1964–1967); Kansas City Athletics (1963–1964); As coach: Baltimore Orioles (1969); Oakland Athletics (1970); Kansas City Royals (1971–1974, 1975–1978); New York Yankees (1979–1981); Chicago White Sox (1982–1983)

Career highlights and awards
- World Series champion (1966)

Charles Richard Lau (April 12, 1933 – March 18, 1984) was an American professional baseball player and a highly influential hitting coach. During his playing career in Major League Baseball, Lau appeared in 527 games as a catcher and pinch hitter over all or portions of 11 seasons for four clubs. Then, beginning in 1969, he spent 15 years as a coach for five American League teams, most notably the Kansas City Royals. He was the incumbent hitting coach of the Chicago White Sox when he died, aged 50, from colorectal cancer in 1984.

== Early life ==
Lau was born on April 12, 1933, in Romulus, Michigan, in the Metro Detroit region. He attended Romulus Senior High School, where he was a standout in baseball, basketball and football. He was originally an outfielder in baseball, but switched to catching, with a three year .450 batting average. Lau was also a star halfback on the football team. The University of Michigan awarded him a combined football-baseball scholarship.

In 1952, he was signed by the nearby Detroit Tigers as an amateur free agent after graduating from high school, without ever playing for Michigan. He did attend Michigan State Normal School (now Eastern Michigan University) for a year.

== As a player ==
=== Detroit Tigers ===
Lau batted left-handed, threw right-handed, and was listed as 6 feet (1.8 m) tall and 190 pounds (86 kg). He was assigned to the Class-D Jamestown Falcons in 1952, where he had a .332 batting average and .959 OPS (on-base plus slugging).

He missed the 1953–1954 seasons, because he served in the military during the Korean War. Lau was stationed at Fort Lewis, Washington, where he did have the opportunity to play organized baseball. He left the military as a sergeant.

In 1955, Lau was assigned to the Class-B Durham Bulls, where he had 18 home runs and a .293 batting average. In 1956, he moved up to the Triple-A Charleston Senators, hitting .258 with 12 home runs. Lau was called up for his first major league audition in September 1956, playing in three games.

However, Lau could not nail down a regular job with Detroit; he got into only 35 total games over parts of three seasons (1956, 1958–1959), and collected 13 total hits, batting .157. He spent the entire 1957 season with Charleston, and split between Charleston (39 games) and the Tigers (30 games but only 68 at bats) in 1958.

In the winter of 1958–59, he played for Marianao in the Cuban Winter League.

=== Milwaukee Braves ===
In October 1959, former Tiger executive John McHale, now general manager of the Milwaukee Braves, acquired Lau and pitcher Don Lee from Detroit for infielder Casey Wise, pitcher Don Kaiser and catcher Mike Roarke. Lau spent all of 1960 with the Braves as the primary backup catcher to veteran Del Crandall, but he hit only .189 in 21 games. In 1961, with Crandall sidelined by a sore shoulder, Lau appeared in 28 early-season games, 24 as starting catcher, into June. On April 28, he caught the second of Warren Spahn's two career no-hitters. But again he struggled offensively, batting .207, and was sent to Triple-A Vancouver, where he hit .294; but then his contract rights were sold to the Baltimore Orioles on August 21.

=== Baltimore Orioles, Kansas City Athletics and Atlanta Braves ===
His offensive problems continued, though, with Lau batting only .170 in limited duty for Baltimore in 1961.

Lau had shown flashes of power in the Tigers' farm system, reaching double figures in home runs three times between 1955 and 1959. But, in 1962, he adopted a contact hitter's batting stance: feet wide apart, his bat held almost parallel to the ground. The result was a dramatic upturn in his major-league fortunes. He played in 81 games and posted a .294 batting average, with 58 hits, six home runs and 37 runs batted in. He hit .367 (11 for 30) in pinch-hitting roles. On July 13, 1962, he hit four doubles in a game, tying a major league record.

In 1963, Lau started slowly, and after hitting .194 in 23 games, the Orioles sold his contract to the Kansas City Athletics on July 1. Given more playing time as a left-handed-hitting platoon catcher, starting 49 games over the 1963 season's final three months, he batted .294 in a Kansas City uniform.

On June 15, 1964, after an injury to starting catcher John Orsino, the pennant-contending Orioles reacquired Lau in exchange for relief pitcher Wes Stock. Splitting receiving duties with right-handed-hitting Dick Brown and Orsino (who returned to play after the trade), Lau appeared in 62 games (starting 42) as Baltimore finished three games behind the New York Yankees in the American League race. He batted .259 as an Oriole, and .264 overall.

In 1965, Lau began the transition to full-time pinch hitter, working in 35 games as a catcher, and collecting eight hits and seven bases on balls in 36 appearances as an emergency batsman; he batted a career-best .295. Then, in 1966, he underwent right elbow surgery and missed almost four full months of the regular season. Appearing in only 18 games, all in the pinch, he collected six hits and four bases on balls as Baltimore won its first pennant and World Series championship. Lau did not play in the Fall Classic; the Orioles used no pinch hitters in their four-game sweep over the Los Angeles Dodgers.

He spent one more season in the majors as a pinch hitter in 1967; after only one hit in eight at-bats with the Orioles, he was sold back to the Braves, now in Atlanta, where he closed his MLB career with nine hits and four walks in 49 plate appearances. On November 27, 1967, the Braves released him.

As a major leaguer, Lau batted .255 over the course of his career. His 298 career hits included 63 doubles, nine triples, 16 home runs and 140 runs batted in. He had 47 pinch hits.

== Manager ==
After releasing Lau, the Braves appointed him manager of their Double-A Shreveport affiliate in the Texas League, where the team had a 78–62 won–loss record. His roster included future hitting coach Walt Hriniak, future National League batting champion and lifetime .306 hitter Ralph Garr, and future major league player and manager Cito Gaston.

== As a hitting coach ==
In the 1970s and 1980s, Lau was considered baseball's leading batting instructor.

Lau spent only the 1968 season as a minor-league skipper before returning to the majors as a coach. He began as bullpen coach on Earl Weaver's staff in Baltimore (1969), then became the first-base coach of the 1970 Oakland Athletics, gradually assuming the extra duties of hitting coach during his early coaching career. He had acted as a hitting coach with the Orioles and A's, and worked extensively with A's outfielder Joe Rudi in 1970, who wound up hitting .309 that year, crediting Lau with turning his career around. In 1968–69, Rudi never hit above .189 in over 300 at bats.

In 1971, Lau became the hitting coach (often doubling as first-base coach) for the Kansas City Royals. He held the post through 1978, with the exception of the early part of the 1975 season, when he was the team's roving minor-league hitting instructor after his temporary ouster from the Royals' staff by then-skipper Jack McKeon. He worked with Hal McRae, Amos Otis, Willie Wilson and George Brett. He is also credited for reviving Cookie Rojas' career. Lou Piniella, who played for the Royals from 1969 to 1973, called Lau "the greatest batting instructor of them all."

Hall of Fame third baseman Brett is likely Lau's most famous student. Brett said of Lau "'Charlie (Lau) made me a hitter. My rookie year I was hitting around .200 when he started working with me. All of a sudden, I started to hit.'" In his 21-year career, Brett had over 3,000 hits, 300 home runs and a .305 lifetime batting average. He led the American League in hitting in 1976, 1980, and 1990, including a .390 batting average in 1980, the highest batting average in a season since 1941, and 121 points over the league average .269. He hit over .300 11 times in his career.

Lau spent three seasons (1979–1981) with the New York Yankees, reunited with Piniella. One of the players he tutored was future Hall of Fame outfielder Reggie Jackson, who had one of his best hitting years in 1980. In 1980, Jackson led the American League in home runs (41, second highest in his career), had 111 RBI, and for the only time in his career had a .300 batting average. In 1979, Jackson hit .297 for the Yankees, second highest in his career. Years earlier, when Jackson was 18-years old, he was playing for a local semi-pro team in Baltimore sponsored by the Orioles, the Orioles brought him in for a workout. Lau was one of the Orioles present watching Jackson bat, and when told Jackson was a freshman college student and not even in the Orioles farm system, Lau told team executives they had better lock the gates and sign Jackson.

Lau became the Chicago White Sox' hitting instructor in 1982, where his pupils included Greg Luzinski, Carlton Fisk, Steve Kemp, Harold Baines and Ron Kittle. Future Hall of Fame White Sox manager Tony La Russa, who considered Lau a genius, credited Lau with developing Kittle's swing in his becoming the 1983 rookie of the year. Lau's six-year contract with the White Sox was the longest ever given to a non-manager coach.

Contrary to popular belief, Lau did not emphasize releasing the top hand after making contact with the pitch and following through with only the lower hand on the bat. He did, however, suggest this measure to hitters who—for whatever reason—could not fully extend their arms during their swings.

Lau developed a list of "Absolutes" about hitting, which included:

- A balanced, workable stance
- Rhythm and movement in the stance (as opposed to standing still)
- A good weight shift from a firm rigid backside to a firm rigid frontside
- Striding with the front toe closed
- Having the bat in the launching position as soon as the front foot touches down
- Making the stride a positive, aggressive motion toward the pitcher
- A tension-free swing
- Hitting through the ball
- Hitting the ball where it is pitched, rather than trying to direct it

== Legacy ==
Since his death, only one White Sox player or coach — Lau's friend and disciple Walt Hriniak, the Chisox' hitting coach from 1989 to 1995 — has worn his number 6 jersey, although it has not been officially retired. In 1984, the baseball field at his alma mater, Romulus Senior High School, was renamed Charlie Lau Memorial Field.

== Death ==
While still serving as the White Sox' hitting coach, Lau died in 1984 in Key Colony Beach, Florida at the age of 50 after a year-long bout with cancer.

== Author and actor ==
Lau was an author to two books on hitting: The highly successful The Art of Hitting .300 and the posthumously released The Winning Hitter.

Lau also appeared in the film Max Dugan Returns as himself. The title character (played by Jason Robards) pays Lau to teach his grandson (Matthew Broderick's character) how to hit.
