= John Orsino =

American baseball player (1938-2016)

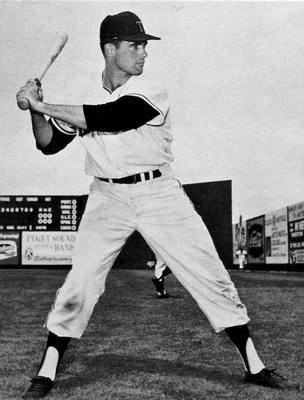
- Catcher
- Born: April 22, 1938; Teaneck, New Jersey, U.S.
- Died: November 1, 2016 (aged 78); Sunny Isles Beach, Florida, U.S.
- Batted: Right Threw: Right

MLB debut
- July 14, 1961, for the San Francisco Giants

Last MLB appearance
- September 10, 1967, for the Washington Senators

MLB statistics
- Batting average: .249
- Home runs: 40
- Runs batted in: 123
- Stats at Baseball Reference

Teams
- San Francisco Giants (1961–1962); Baltimore Orioles (1963–1965); Washington Senators (1966–1967)

John Joseph Orsino (April 22, 1938 – November 1, 2016) was an American Major League Baseball catcher. He was signed by the New York Giants as an amateur free agent before the 1957 season, and played for the San Francisco Giants (1961–1962), Baltimore Orioles (1963–1965), and Washington Senators (1966–1967). After a career year in 1963, he career was later cut short by chronic arm problems.

== Early life ==
Orsino was born on April 22, 1938, in Teaneck, New Jersey, the only child of John and Helen (Higgins) Orsino. He grew up in nearby Fort Lee, where he attended Fort Lee High School. Orsino played on the school's baseball and basketball teams. He was named to the Bergen County Scholastic League second-team All-League in basketball, at center.

He attended the University of Bridgeport on a full tuition scholarship. The New York Giants Willard Marshall helped get him into Bridgeport, and then when Orsino decided to leave the school during his first year, it was Marshall that signed him to a professional baseball contract with the Giants.

== Playing career ==
The New York Giants signed Orsino as an amateur free agent in 1957.

=== Minor leagues ===
In 1957, he was assigned to the Class-D Michigan City White Caps, where he played over 100 games at catcher, with a .223 batting average and 20 home runs. From 1958-60, he played at various levels in the now San Francisco Giants minor league system. In 1960, he hit .296 with a .970 OPS (on-base plus slugging) for the Double-A Rio Grande Valley Giants, with 21 home runs and 63 runs batted in (RBI) in only 314 at bats. Orsino had been called for military service during the off-season. He began the 1961 season with the Triple-A Tacoma Giants, when he was called up by the major league Giants on July 14, 1961.

=== Major leagues ===
==== San Francisco Giants ====
Orsino made his major league debut on July 14, 1961, against the Pittsburgh Pirates at Candlestick Park. He was the starting catcher and went 0-for-3 with 3 putouts, 2 assists, an error, and a passed ball. The Giants lost, 6–4. The next day was a lot better; he was in the starting lineup again and went 1-for-3 with a walk, a run batted in, a run scored, and no errors in the field as the Giants crushed the Pirates 8–3. His first major league hit was against Harvey Haddix. He finished out the 1961 season with the Giants, hitting .277 in 83 at bats, with four home runs, starting 22 games.

He was called up again to serve in the Army shortly after the season ended because of the Berlin crisis, and would miss considerable playing time the following season before returning to the Giants. The Giants went to the World Series in 1962, but Orsino only played in 18 games for the Giants that year. The Army did not release him until mid-season, and teammates Tom Haller and Ed Bailey were established as the team's catchers by then. He had one at bat in the World Series.

==== Baltimore Orioles ====
On December 15, 1962, Orsino was acquired along with Stu Miller and Mike McCormick by the Orioles from the Giants for Jack Fisher, Billy Hoeft and Jimmie Coker. His best major league season was 1963, when he had career highs in games played (116), hits (103), at bats (379), home runs (19), runs batted in (56), runs scored (53), and on-base percentage (.349). The Orioles had a good year, winning 86 games and losing 76.

In 1964, Orsino split time as starting catcher with Dick Brown and Charlie Lau (for whom the Orioles traded in June after Orsino was injured). Orsino suffered a broken hand in late May that required surgery. Orsino did come back in the 1964 season, but he never again matched his 1963 numbers during his career.

At Memorial Stadium on September 12, 1964, Orsino was the Orioles starting catcher in a rare battle of complete game one-hitters, between Baltimore's Frank Bertaina and Bob Meyer of the Kansas City Athletics. Orsino doubled to lead off the bottom of the eighth inning of the scoreless game, and teammate Bob Saverine came in to pinch run for him. Saverine advanced to third on a Bertaina sacrifice bunt, and then scored when Jackie Brandt hit a sacrifice fly.

==== Final playing years ====
In 1965, Orsino started 60 games for the Orioles, batting .233, with nine home runs in 232 at bats, with Brown and Lau starting the majority of games at catcher. He started the season well, but he developed problems with his throwing arm, and he could not make the throws required of him as a catcher.

In October 1965, the Orioles traded him to the Senators for Woodie Held. Orsino was injured again in 1966, suffering an elbow injury that required surgery. He tried coming back but was placed on the disabled list multiple times. He played in only 14 games for the Senators that year. He had surgery to remove a cyst from his elbow after the season ended. He would only play one more game for the Senators (1967), that would be his last in major league baseball.

With his ongoing elbow troubles, Orsino was assigned to the Senators Triple-A affiliate the Hawaii Islanders in 1967, but only played in 16 games. Treating doctors could not determine the cause of his problems, and he described his inability to throw as "like living in hell". In 1968, he played a total of 95 games combined for the Senators Double-A and Triple-A minor league teams, hitting .278 with 10 home runs.

His contract rights were sold to the New York Yankees in January 1969, and he played 32 games for the Yankees Triple-A affiliate Syracuse Chiefs, before being traded to the Cleveland Indians on June 12 for Rob Gardner. His finished his professional career with the Triple-A Portland Beavers. Overall in 1969 playing Triple-A baseball, he again hit .278 with 10 home runs to end his professional baseball playing career.

Orsino's career major league totals for 332 games include 252 hits, 40 home runs, 123 runs batted in, 114 runs scored, a .249 batting average, and a slugging percentage of .420. Orsino hit a combined .324 (22-for-68) against All-Star pitchers Jim Bouton, Harvey Haddix, Tommy John, Gary Peters and Stan Williams, and a combined .323 (10-for-31) against Hall of Fame pitchers Jim Bunning and Whitey Ford.

== Baseball coaching ==
After his career ended, Orsino moved back to Fort Lee. He became the baseball coach at Fairleigh Dickinson University (FDU) from 1970 to 1976 and again in 1980. He had a 119–91 record during his first stint at FDU, and led the team to its first appearance in the NCAA tournament.

Orsino left FDU to become a minor league manager in the Cleveland Indians farm system. He was originally hired to manage the Williamsport Tomahawks, but that team ceased to exist after the 1976 season, and Orsino instead became manager of the Double-A Jersey City Indians of the Eastern League. In 1978, he managed the Double-A Cleveland affiliate in the Southern League, the Chattanooga Loukouts. He rejoined FDU as coach in 1980, but resigned after one year to give his attention to other business commitments.

== Personal life and post-retirement ==
As his injury problems worsened during his career, Orsino realized he might have to prematurely retire, and began taking classes at Fairleigh Dickinson University (FDU) to prepare for his future, where he was studying to become a teacher.

He went on to coach Florida Atlantic University's men's golf team in 2004-2006. He had two children from his first marriage, Jeryl, a fitness professional, and John (Jay) Orsino, a golf pro, and three grandchildren. Charlie, Wyatt and Oliver Orsino.

== Death ==
John Orsino died on November 1, 2016, in Sunny Isles Beach, Florida, at age 78.
