= Canadian Lakes, Michigan =

- Census-designated place (CDP) & unincorporated community
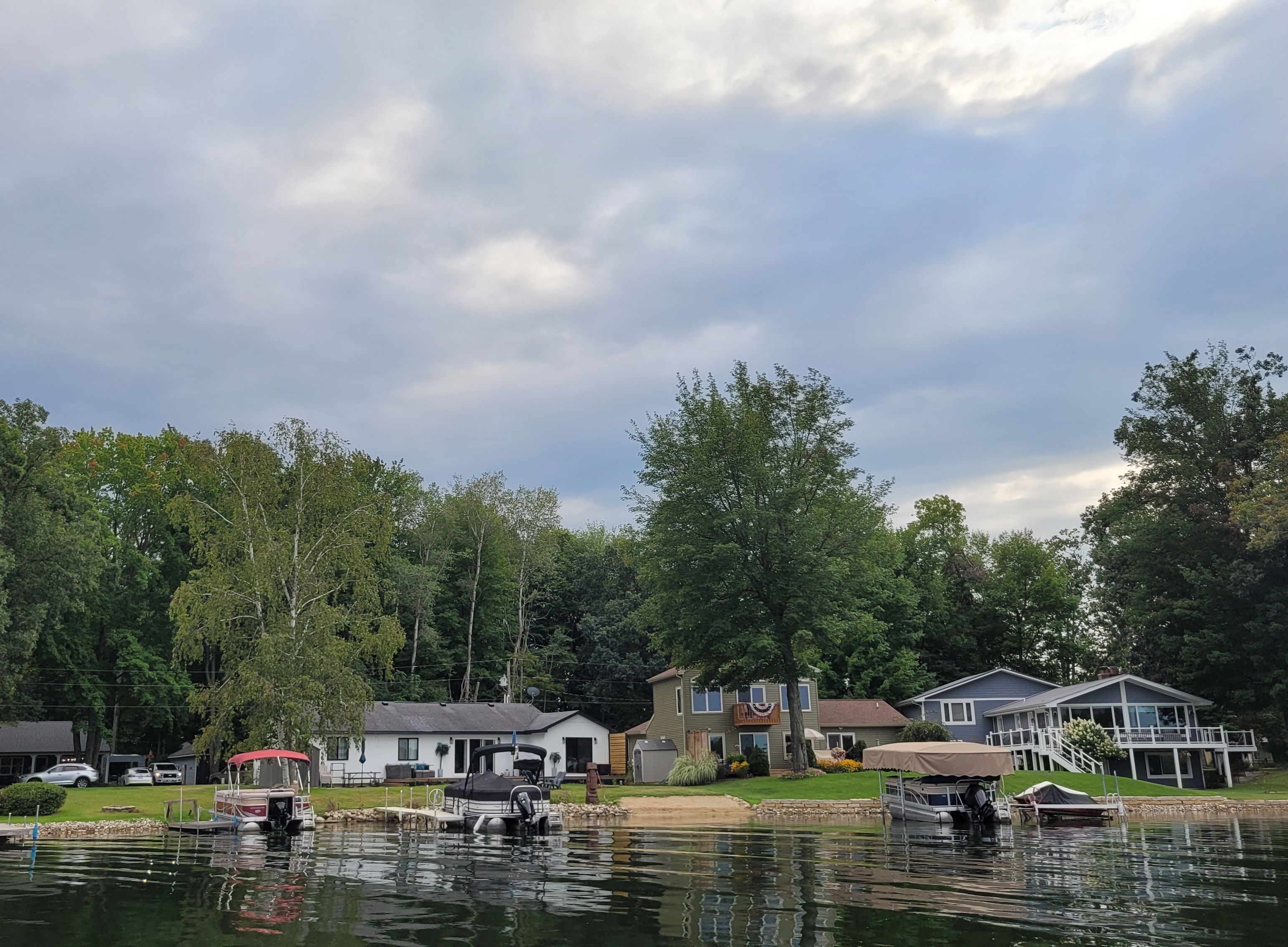
- Houses in Canadian Lakes

- Location within Mecosta County

- Location within the state of Michigan Location within the United States
- Coordinates: 43°34′45″N 85°18′06″W
- Country: United States
- State: Michigan
- County: Mecosta
- Townships: Austin and Morton

Area
  - Total: 11.58 sq mi (30.00 km^{2})
  - Land: 10.33 sq mi (26.76 km^{2})
  - Water: 1.25 sq mi (3.25 km^{2})
- Elevation: 965 ft (294 m)

Population (2020)
  - Total: 3,202
  - Density: 309.97/sq mi (119.68/km^{2})
- Time zone: UTC-5 (Eastern (EST))
  - Summer (DST): UTC-4 (EDT)
- ZIP code(s): 49346 (Stanwood)
- Area code: 231
- FIPS code: 26-13010
- GNIS feature ID: 1852242

Canadian Lakes is an unincorporated community and census-designated place (CDP) in Mecosta County in the U.S. state of Michigan. The area is mostly within the southwest portion of Morton Township, southwest of Mecosta and east of Stanwood. As of the 2020 census, the CDP population was 3,202, up from 2,756 in 2010. The area defined by the CDP includes small portions in eastern Austin Township.

== Geography ==
Most of the area is served by the Stanwood ZIP code 49346, although "Canadian Lakes, Michigan", is an acceptable name for mail delivery by the post office. The village of Stanwood is 7 miles (11 km) west of the community. Small portions of the CDP are served by other postal delivery areas. A small portion in the southern area of the CDP along the Little Muskegon River is served by the Lakeview ZIP code, 48850, and a small area in the eastern part of the CDP is served by the Mecosta ZIP code, 49332. Lakeview is 9 miles (14 km) to the south, and Mecosta is 5 miles (8 km) to the northeast.

According to the United States Census Bureau, the community has a total area of 11.6 square miles (30 km^{2}), of which 10.3 square miles (27 km^{2}) are land and 1.3 square miles (3.4 km^{2}), or 10.82%, are water. The community is named for a collection of lakes in the valley of the Little Muskegon River.

== Demographics ==
Historical population
Census	Pop.	Note	%±
2000	1,922		—
2010	2,756		43.4%
2020	3,202		16.2%
U.S. Decennial Census

=== 2020 census ===
As of the 2020 census, Canadian Lakes had a population of 3,202. The median age was 60.0 years. 13.7% of residents were under the age of 18 and 40.6% of residents were 65 years of age or older. For every 100 females there were 92.7 males, and for every 100 females age 18 and over there were 93.0 males age 18 and over.

0.0% of residents lived in urban areas, while 100.0% lived in rural areas.

There were 1,505 households in Canadian Lakes, of which 17.0% had children under the age of 18 living in them. Of all households, 64.0% were married-couple households, 14.1% were households with a male householder and no spouse or partner present, and 17.5% were households with a female householder and no spouse or partner present. About 23.8% of all households were made up of individuals and 14.1% had someone living alone who was 65 years of age or older.

There were 2,267 housing units, of which 33.6% were vacant. The homeowner vacancy rate was 1.0% and the rental vacancy rate was 15.9%.

Racial composition as of the 2020 census
Race	Number	Percent
White	2,992	93.4%
Black or African American	18	0.6%
American Indian and Alaska Native	18	0.6%
Asian	17	0.5%
Native Hawaiian and Other Pacific Islander	2	0.1%
Some other race	19	0.6%
Two or more races	136	4.2%
Hispanic or Latino (of any race)	46	1.4%

=== 2000 census ===
As of the 2000 census, there were 1,922 people, 923 households, and 726 families residing in the community. The population density was 202.3 inhabitants per square mile (78.1/km^{2}). There were 1,624 housing units at an average density of 171.0 per square mile (66.0/km^{2}). The racial makeup of the community was 97.81% White, 0.52% African American, 0.21% Native American, 0.21% Asian, 0.21% from other races, and 1.04% from two or more races. Hispanic or Latino of any race were 0.73% of the population.

There were 923 households, out of which 10.7% had children under the age of 18 living with them, 75.2% were married couples living together, 2.3% had a female householder with no husband present, and 21.3% were non-families. 18.7% of all households were made up of individuals, and 11.2% had someone living alone who was 65 years of age or older. The average household size was 2.08 and the average family size was 2.32.

In the community, the population was spread out, with 10.1% under the age of 18, 2.8% from 18 to 24, 13.0% from 25 to 44, 36.4% from 45 to 64, and 37.8% who were 65 years of age or older. The median age was 61 years. For every 100 females, there were 97.7 males. For every 100 females age 18 and over, there were 95.0 males.

The median income for a household in the community was $51,595, and the median income for a family was $56,595. Males had a median income of $45,000 versus $31,842 for females. The per capita income for the community was $30,770. About 3.1% of families and 5.1% of the population were below the poverty line, including 15.5% of those under age 18 and 1.8% of those age 65 or over.
