= Mike McCormick (pitcher) =

American baseball player (1938–2020)

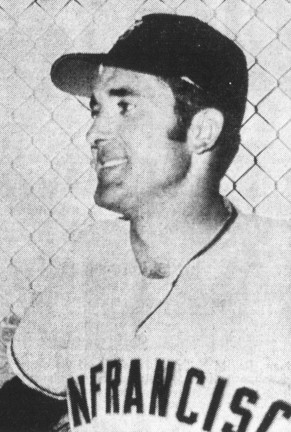
- Pitcher
- Born: September 29, 1938; Pasadena, California, U.S.
- Died: June 13, 2020 (aged 81); Cornelius, North Carolina, U.S.
- Batted: Left Threw: Left

MLB debut
- September 3, 1956, for the New York Giants

Last MLB appearance
- May 22, 1971, for the Kansas City Royals

MLB statistics
- Win–loss record: 134–128
- Earned run average: 3.73
- Strikeouts: 1,321
- Stats at Baseball Reference

Teams
- New York / San Francisco Giants (1956–1962); Baltimore Orioles (1963–1964); Washington Senators (1965–1966); San Francisco Giants (1967–1970); New York Yankees (1970); Kansas City Royals (1971)

Career highlights and awards
- 4× All-Star (1960–1961²); NL Cy Young Award (1967); NL wins leader (1967); NL ERA leader (1960); San Francisco Giants Wall of Fame

Michael Francis McCormick (September 29, 1938 – June 13, 2020) was an American professional baseball pitcher who played 16 seasons in Major League Baseball (MLB). He played for the New York/San Francisco Giants, Baltimore Orioles, Washington Senators, New York Yankees and Kansas City Royals from 1956 to 1971. He batted and threw left-handed and served primarily as a starting pitcher.

Signed by the Giants as a bonus baby, McCormick went directly to the major leagues and made his debut on September 3, 1956. After spending seven seasons with the organization, he was traded to the Baltimore Orioles and played two years there before being dealt again, this time to the Washington Senators. He returned to the Giants in 1967 and in his first season back with the team, he became the first pitcher in Giants franchise history to win the Cy Young Award (from 1956 to 1966, the Award was only given out to one pitcher rather than one from each of the two leagues). In the middle of the 1970 season, he was traded to the New York Yankees, who released him before the start of the next season. He then signed with the Kansas City Royals, with whom he played his last game on May 22, 1971.

== Early life ==
McCormick was born on September 29, 1938, in Pasadena, California. He studied at Mark Keppel High School in Alhambra, California. During this time, he played in American Legion Baseball, where he won 49 out of the 53 games he pitched, threw four no-hitters and struck out 26 batters in a game.

After he graduated from high school, he married Carolyn Koehler on August 2, 1956. Several weeks later, on August 31, the New York Giants signed him as an amateur free agent. Although McCormick was committed to attending college at the University of Southern California, the Giants offered him a signing bonus of $50,000 to forego university and join the organization. Because of the Bonus Rule, he could not be placed in the minor leagues for two years. As a result, he went directly to the major leagues and immediately began training with the first team the day after he signed.

== Professional career ==
McCormick made his major league debut for the Giants on September 3, 1956, at the age of 17, relieving Rubén Gómez in the ninth inning and retiring all three batters he faced in a 5–1 loss against the Philadelphia Phillies. He made two starts later in the season, and finished with a 0–1 win–loss record and a 9.45 earned run average (ERA) in 6 2/3 innings pitched.

McCormick threw a five-inning rain-shortened no-hitter against the Phillies on June 12, 1959, allowing one walk. The Phillies were able to secure 1 hit (and 1 run) in the bottom of the 6th inning, but the game was called because of the rain. As the 6th inning was never finished, the game statistics reverted to the completion of the last full inning, securing his no-hitter. However, due to a statistical rule change in 1991, no-hitters must last at least nine innings to count. As a result of the retroactive application of the new rule, this game and thirty-five others are no longer considered no-hitters.

He was acquired along with Stu Miller and John Orsino by the Orioles from the Giants for Jack Fisher, Billy Hoeft and Jimmie Coker on December 15, 1962.

At the end of the 1966 season, McCormick returned to the Giants in a trade that brought Cap Peterson and Bob Priddy to the Senators.

The 1967 season saw McCormick churn out one of the best statistical years in his career. He led the National League (NL) in wins with 22, and defeated every NL team other than the Giants that year. At the end of the season, McCormick won the Cy Young Award, garnering 90% of the vote and 18 out of 20 first place votes. In doing so, he became the first Giants pitcher to win the award, and was the only one to do so for 41 years until Tim Lincecum won it in 2008.

McCormick was described, apparently in good faith, as the player who hit the 500th home run by an MLB pitcher. However, it is unclear how this was calculated, in an age without baseball encyclopedias, and it appears to have been a considerable under-estimate. In contrast, the claim that he was responsible for giving up Hank Aaron's 500th home run is undoubtedly correct. Because of these two reports, he personalized his license plate with the words "Mr. 500".

== Personal life ==
After retiring from baseball, McCormick went on to pursue a career in securities business that he himself established over several MLB offseasons.

After three years in that field, he switched to office machines and copiers, working for Ricoh and then Danka, before retiring in 2002.

He served annually as a guest instructor for the San Francisco Giants during spring training. He also conducted the team's fantasy camps and occasionally commentated on Giants' games.

McCormick's Cy Young Award plaque was damaged in the 1989 Loma Prieta earthquake after it fell off the wall of his Cupertino condominium. Although he was initially going to get the crack at the back repaired, he decided against it, noting how "it had more character now." He then housed it in a special room along with other memorabilia from his career.

== Family ==
McCormick had four children from his first marriage to Carolyn. He was married to wife Dierdre for 34 years. They had one daughter, Tara.

After retiring from Danka, they moved from Sunnyvale, California and settled in Pinehurst, North Carolina. At the O'Neal School in Southern Pines, North Carolina, McCormick assisted the school's baseball program and donated his baseball memorabilia to the school to help them with their auctions.

== Death ==
McCormick died on June 13, 2020, at his home in North Carolina. He was 81, and had been suffering from Parkinson's disease in the years leading up to his death.

== See also ==
- List of Major League Baseball annual ERA leaders
- List of Major League Baseball annual wins leaders
