= 1959 Philadelphia Phillies season =

Major League Baseball season

1959 Philadelphia Phillies
- League: National League
- Ballpark: Connie Mack Stadium
- City: Philadelphia
- Owners: R. R. M. Carpenter, Jr.
- General managers: John J. Quinn
- Managers: Eddie Sawyer
- Television: WFIL
- Radio: WIP (By Saam, Gene Kelly, Claude Haring)

The 1959 Philadelphia Phillies season was the 77th season in the history of the franchise. During spring training, manager Eddie Sawyer told the press, "We're definitely not a last place club... I think the biggest thing we've accomplished is getting rid of the losing complex. That alone makes us not a last place club." The Phillies finished in last place in 1959, seven games behind seventh-place St. Louis and 23 games behind the pennant and World Series winning Dodgers. They attracted 802,515 fans to Connie Mack Stadium, seventh in the eight-team league.

== Offseason ==
In early 1959, Phillies owner Bob Carpenter proposed building a new ballpark for the Phillies on 72 acres (290,000 m^{2}) adjacent to the Garden State Park Racetrack in Cherry Hill, New Jersey. Connie Mack Stadium was 50 years old, did not have sufficient parking, and the sale of alcohol was banned at sports venues in Pennsylvania. Beer sales were legal in New Jersey. The proposed ballpark would have seated 45,000 fans, been expandable to 60,000, and would have had 15,000 parking spaces. On January 13, Carpenter also changed general_managers, replacing Roy Hamey with John J. Quinn, recruited from the defending two-time National League champion Milwaukee Braves. Quinn would run the Phils' front office for almost 14 full seasons.

=== Notable transactions ===
- December 1, 1958: Johnny O'Brien was drafted by the Phillies from the St. Louis Cardinals in the 1958 rule 5 draft.
- December 2, 1958: John Herrnstein was signed as an amateur free agent by the Phillies.
- December 3, 1958: Chuck Essegian was traded by the Phillies to the St. Louis Cardinals for Rubén Amaro.
- December 3, 1958: Jack Sanford was traded by the Phillies to the San Francisco Giants for Rubén Gómez and Valmy Thomas.
- December 23, 1958: Rip Repulski, Jim Golden and Gene Snyder were traded by the Phillies to the Los Angeles Dodgers for Sparky Anderson.
- March 31, 1959: Johnny O'Brien, Ted Kazanski and Stan Lopata were traded by the Phillies to the Milwaukee Braves for Gene Conley, Harry Hanebrink and Joe Koppe.
- Prior to 1959 season: John Anderson was returned by the Phillies to the Miami Marlins after expiration of their minor league working agreement.

== Regular season ==
On April 11, coach Benny Bengough was removed from the coaching staff and reassigned to the front office where he worked in team public relations.

=== Season standings ===
National League
Team	W	L	Pct.	GB	Home	Road
Los Angeles Dodgers	88	68	.564	—	46‍–‍32	42‍–‍36
Milwaukee Braves	86	70	.551	2	49‍–‍29	37‍–‍41
San Francisco Giants	83	71	.539	4	42‍–‍35	41‍–‍36
Pittsburgh Pirates	78	76	.506	9	47‍–‍30	31‍–‍46
Chicago Cubs	74	80	.481	13	38‍–‍39	36‍–‍41
Cincinnati Reds	74	80	.481	13	43‍–‍34	31‍–‍46
St. Louis Cardinals	71	83	.461	16	42‍–‍35	29‍–‍48
Philadelphia Phillies	64	90	.416	23	37‍–‍40	27‍–‍50

=== Record vs. opponents ===
1959 National League record Sources:
Team	CHC	CIN	LAD	MIL	PHI	PIT	SF	STL
Chicago	—	9–13	11–11	10–12	10–12–1	12–10	12–10	10–12
Cincinnati	13–9	—	13–9	11–11	9–13	9–13	8–14	11–11
Los Angeles	11–11	9–13	—	14–10	17–5	11–11	14–8	12–10
Milwaukee	12–10	11–11	10–14	—	13–9	15–7–1	12–10	13–9
Philadelphia	12–10–1	13–9	5–17	9–13	—	9–13	9–13	7–15
Pittsburgh	10–12	13–9	11–11	7–15–1	13–9	—	10–12	14–8
San Francisco	10–12	14–8	8–14	10–12	13–9	12–10	—	16–6
St. Louis	12–10	11–11	10–12	9–13	15–7	8–14	6–16	—

=== Notable transactions ===
- April 13, 1959: Bobby Del Greco was purchased by the Phillies from the New York Yankees.
- June 5, 1959: Gary Kroll was signed as an amateur free agent by the Phillies.
- June 6, 1959: Willie Jones was traded by the Phillies to the Cleveland Indians for Jim Bolger and cash.

=== Game log ===
1959 game log (Overall Record: 64–90–1)
April (6–8)

#	Date	Opponent	Score	Win	Loss	Save	Attendance	Record
1	April 10	Reds	2–1	**Robin Roberts** (1–0)	Don Newcombe (0–1)	None	22,189	1–0
–	April 11	Reds	Postponed (rain); Makeup: July 2 as a traditional double-header					
–	April 12 (1)	Reds	Postponed (rain); Makeup: August 14 as a traditional double-header					
–	April 12 (2)	Reds	Postponed (rain); Makeup: September 22 as a traditional double-header					
2	April 14	@ Braves	3–4 (10)	Don McMahon (1–0)	**Turk Farrell** (0–1)	None	42,081	1–1
3	April 16	@ Braves	3–7	Lew Burdette (2–0)	**Jack Meyer** (0–1)	None	11,186	1–2
4	April 17	@ Reds	5–1	**Ray Semproch** (1–0)	Brooks Lawrence (0–1)	None	8,376	2–2
5	April 18	@ Reds	14–9	**Al Schroll** (1–0)	Don Newcombe (0–2)	None	2,890	3–2
6	April 19	@ Reds	5–12	Bob Mabe (1–0)	**Jim Owens** (0–1)	None	8,091	3–3
–	April 20	@ Pirates	Postponed (rain, wet grounds); Makeup: May 7					
7	April 22	Braves	0–2	Lew Burdette (3–0)	**Robin Roberts** (1–1)	None	14,228	3–4
8	April 23	Braves	4–3	**Ray Semproch** (2–0)	Juan Pizarro (0–1)	None	8,689	4–4
9	April 24	Pirates	5–8	Roy Face (2–0)	**Al Schroll** (1–1)	None	15,675	4–5
10	April 25	Pirates	2–4	Harvey Haddix (1–0)	**Seth Morehead** (0–1)	None	6,678	4–6
11	April 26 (1)	Pirates	2–9	Vern Law (2–1)	**Don Cardwell** (0–1)	None	see 2nd game	4–7
12	April 26 (2)	Pirates	10–5^{^{[a]}}	**Jack Meyer** (1–1)	Bob Friend (0–3)	None	19,266	5–7
–	April 27	Giants	Postponed (rain); Makeup: June 14 as a traditional double-header					
–	April 28	Giants	Postponed (rain, cold weather); Makeup: July 14 as a traditional double-header					
13	April 29	Dodgers	5–4	**Jack Meyer** (2–1)	Johnny Podres (2–2)	None	13,775	6–7
14	April 30	Dodgers	4–6	Johnny Klippstein (3–0)	**Ray Semproch** (2–1)	Art Fowler (1)	11,547	6–8

May (11–21)

#	Date	Opponent	Score	Win	Loss	Save	Attendance	Record
15	May 1	Cubs	4–2	**Jim Owens** (1–1)	Glen Hobbie (2–2)	None	9,054	7–8
16	May 2	Cubs	3–4	Joe Schaffernoth (1–0)	**Seth Morehead** (0–2)	Don Elston (5)	4,171	7–9
17	May 3 (1)	Cubs	3–4	John Buzhardt (1–2)	**Turk Farrell** (0–2)	Don Elston (6)	see 2nd game	7–10
18	May 3 (2)	Cubs	5–4	**Jack Meyer** (3–1)	Bill Henry (2–1)	None	13,660	8–10
19	May 5	Cardinals	8–7	**Turk Farrell** (1–2)	Larry Jackson (0–4)	None	12,023	9–10
20	May 6	Cardinals	7–8	Howie Nunn (1–1)	**Jack Meyer** (3–2)	Jim Brosnan (2)	12,005	9–11
21	May 7	@ Pirates	4–5 (10)	Roy Face (4–0)	**Jim Owens** (1–2)	None	10,358	9–12
22	May 8	@ Pirates	8–1	**Gene Conley** (1–0)	Red Witt (0–4)	**Turk Farrell** (1)	17,691	10–12
23	May 9	@ Pirates	1–9	Ron Kline (3–1)	**Rubén Gómez** (0–1)	None	9,633	10–13
24	May 10 (1)	@ Pirates	6–3	**Robin Roberts** (2–1)	Bob Friend (0–6)	**Turk Farrell** (2)	see 2nd game	11–13
25	May 10 (2)	@ Pirates	6–7^{^{[b]}}	Harvey Haddix (3–1)	**Jim Hearn** (0–1)	Roy Face (2)	23,549	11–14
26	May 11	@ Dodgers	10–11	Art Fowler (3–2)	**Jim Hearn** (0–2)	None	13,524	11–15
27	May 12	@ Dodgers	1–3	Danny McDevitt (2–1)	**Gene Conley** (1–1)	None	12,562	11–16
28	May 13	@ Giants	0–6	Sam Jones (3–4)	**Rubén Gómez** (0–2)	None	5,128	11–17
29	May 14	@ Giants	0–8	Mike McCormick (1–2)	**Ray Semproch** (2–2)	None	6,235	11–18
30	May 15	@ Cardinals	2–8	Vinegar Bend Mizell (4–1)	**Robin Roberts** (2–2)	None	6,003	11–19
31	May 16	@ Cardinals	2–8	Gary Blaylock (3–1)	**Jim Owens** (1–3)	None	6,609	11–20
–	May 17 (1)	@ Cardinals	Postponed (rain); Makeup: June 16 as a traditional double-header					
–	May 17 (2)	@ Cardinals	Postponed (rain); Makeup: August 8 as a traditional double-header					
32	May 19	@ Cubs	7–8	Don Elston (3–1)	**Taylor Phillips** (0–3)	None	2,436	11–21
33	May 20	@ Cubs	5–7	Moe Drabowsky (2–3)	**Don Cardwell** (0–2)	Don Elston (7)	4,825	11–22
34	May 21	@ Cubs	3–0	**Rubén Gómez** (1–2)	Bob Anderson (2–3)	None	3,725	12–22
35	May 22	Braves	5–10	Lew Burdette (7–2)	**Robin Roberts** (2–3)	None	24,043	12–23
36	May 23	Braves	4–2	**Jim Owens** (2–3)	Warren Spahn (5–5)	None	8,346	13–23
37	May 24 (1)	Braves	6–0	**Gene Conley** (2–1)	Joey Jay (2–2)	None	see 2nd game	14–23
38	May 24 (2)	Braves	3–8	Carl Willey (2–1)	**Taylor Phillips** (0–4)	None	26,646	14–24
39	May 25	Braves	7–3	**Don Cardwell** (1–2)	Bob Buhl (2–3)	**Ray Semproch** (1)	16,681	15–24
40	May 26	@ Reds	1–2	Don Newcombe (4–4)	**Rubén Gómez** (1–3)	None	7,312	15–25
41	May 27	@ Reds	4–10	Bob Purkey (5–5)	**Robin Roberts** (2–4)	None	5,348	15–26
42	May 28	@ Reds	4–3	**Jim Owens** (3–3)	Joe Nuxhall (2–3)	**Ray Semproch** (2)	6,819	16–26
43	May 29	@ Braves	5–6	Don McMahon (2–0)	**Gene Conley** (2–2)	None	20,334	16–27
44	May 30	@ Braves	2–4	Bob Buhl (3–3)	**Don Cardwell** (1–3)	None	18,945	16–28
45	May 31 (1)	@ Braves	6–0	**Robin Roberts** (3–4)	Lew Burdette (8–3)	None	see 2nd game	17–28
46	May 31 (2)	@ Braves	1–2	Warren Spahn (7–5)	**Ray Semproch** (2–3)	None	28,590	17–29

June (9–17)

#	Date	Opponent	Score	Win	Loss	Save	Attendance	Record
–	June 2	Cubs	Postponed (rain); Makeup: August 19 as a traditional double-header					
47	June 3	Cubs	4–3	**Jim Owens** (4–3)	Dave Hillman (3–4)	None	7,883	18–29
48	June 4	Cubs	2–3 (10)	Don Elston (4–1)	**Gene Conley** (2–3)	None	7,445	18–30
–	June 5	Cardinals	Postponed (rain); Makeup: July 9 as a traditional double-header					
49	June 6	Cardinals	4–3 (10)	**Robin Roberts** (4–4)	Lindy McDaniel (3–8)	None	5,940	19–30
50	June 7 (1)	Cardinals	11–9	**Jack Meyer** (4–2)	Ernie Broglio (0–5)	**Gene Conley** (1)	see 2nd game	20–30
51	June 7 (2)	Cardinals	0–2	Vinegar Bend Mizell (7–2)	**Don Cardwell** (1–4)	None	15,742	20–31
52	June 9	Dodgers	2–3	Stan Williams (3–1)	**Ray Semproch** (2–4)	Sandy Koufax (1)	16,575	20–32
53	June 10	Dodgers	2–1	**Gene Conley** (3–3)	Danny McDevitt (3–6)	None	11,079	21–32
54	June 11	Dodgers	0–11	Johnny Podres (7–2)	**Robin Roberts** (4–5)	None	15,819	21–33
55	June 12	Giants	0–3 (5)	Mike McCormick (4–5)	**Jack Meyer** (4–3)	None	20,595	21–34
56	June 13	Giants	1–2	Johnny Antonelli (9–3)	**Ray Semproch** (2–5)	None	18,941	21–35
57	June 14 (1)	Giants	7–5	**Humberto Robinson** (2–0)	Sam Jones (7–6)	None	see 2nd game	22–35
58	June 14 (2)	Giants	6–3	**Robin Roberts** (5–5)	Stu Miller (3–3)	None	21,562	23–35
59	June 16 (1)	@ Cardinals	1–8	Vinegar Bend Mizell (8–3)	**Rubén Gómez** (1–4)	None	see 2nd game	23–36
60	June 16 (2)	@ Cardinals	2–5	Ernie Broglio (1–5)	**Jim Owens** (4–4)	Lindy McDaniel (4)	17,068	23–37
61	June 17	@ Cardinals	4–10	Marshall Bridges (1–0)	**Humberto Robinson** (2–1)	None	16,765	23–38
62	June 19	@ Cubs	8–7	**Gene Conley** (4–3)	Bob Anderson (3–6)	**Jim Owens** (1)	8,516	24–38
63	June 20	@ Cubs	6–3	**Robin Roberts** (6–5)	Dick Drott (1–1)	None	13,557	25–38
64	June 21	@ Cubs	0–4	John Buzhardt (4–2)	**Rubén Gómez** (1–5)	None	17,995	25–39
65	June 22	@ Dodgers	2–6	Sandy Koufax (4–1)	**Jim Owens** (4–5)	None	10,290	25–40
66	June 23	@ Dodgers	3–4	Danny McDevitt (6–6)	**Gene Conley** (4–4)	None	11,978	25–41
67	June 24	@ Dodgers	6–9	Roger Craig (2–0)	**Don Cardwell** (1–5)	Clem Labine (7)	17,315	25–42
68	June 25	@ Dodgers	2–5	Don Drysdale (8–5)	**Robin Roberts** (6–6)	None	14,662	25–43
69	June 26	@ Giants	0–8	Mike McCormick (6–7)	**Jim Owens** (4–6)	None	15,816	25–44
70	June 27	@ Giants	7–4	**Gene Conley** (5–4)	Sam Jones (8–8)	None	16,194	26–44
71	June 28	@ Giants	0–6	Johnny Antonelli (11–4)	**Ray Semproch** (2–6)	None	20,793	26–45
72	June 30	Pirates	3–4	Harvey Haddix (6–6)	**Robin Roberts** (6–7)	Roy Face (8)	11,149	26–46

July (16–12)

#	Date	Opponent	Score	Win	Loss	Save	Attendance	Record
73	July 1	Pirates	1–0	**Gene Conley** (6–4)	Ron Kline (6–6)	None	7,897	27–46
74	July 2 (1)	Reds	7–6	**Don Cardwell** (2–5)	Jim Brosnan (3–4)	**Turk Farrell** (3)	see 2nd game	28–46
75	July 2 (2)	Reds	4–8	Don Newcombe (9–4)	**Rubén Gómez** (1–6)	None	15,428	28–47
76	July 3	Reds	1–6	Jim O'Toole (1–2)	**Jim Owens** (4–7)	Brooks Lawrence (1)	7,184	28–48
77	July 4	Braves	2–1	**Robin Roberts** (7–7)	Lew Burdette (11–8)	None	16,775	29–48
78	July 5	Braves	0–5	Carl Willey (4–2)	**Gene Conley** (6–5)	None	9,768	29–49
–	July 7	**1959 Major League Baseball All-Star Game at Forbes Field in Pittsburgh**						
79	July 9 (1)	Cardinals	11–0	**Gene Conley** (7–5)	Ernie Broglio (3–6)	None	see 2nd game	30–49
80	July 9 (2)	Cardinals	2–6	Larry Jackson (8–7)	**Robin Roberts** (7–8)	None	20,282	30–50
81	July 10	Cardinals	7–9	Vinegar Bend Mizell (10–3)	**Jim Owens** (4–8)	Lindy McDaniel (10)	6,946	30–51
82	July 11	Cardinals	3–4	Marshall Bridges (3–0)	**Don Cardwell** (2–6)	Dean Stone (1)	4,815	30–52
83	July 12 (1)	Cubs	6–7	Art Ceccarelli (1–0)	**Rubén Gómez** (1–7)	Bill Henry (7)	see 2nd game	30–53
84	July 12 (2)	Cubs	4–1	**Ray Semproch** (3–6)	Moe Drabowsky (4–7)	None	6,519	31–53
–	July 14 (1)	Giants	Postponed (rain, wet grounds); Makeup: July 16 as a traditional double-header					
–	July 14 (2)	Giants	Postponed (rain, wet grounds); Makeup: August 21 as a traditional double-header					
–	July 15	Giants	Postponed (rain); Makeup: August 23 as a traditional double-header					
85	July 16 (1)	Giants	6–4	**Robin Roberts** (8–8)	Jack Sanford (7–9)	None	see 2nd game	32–53
86	July 16 (2)	Giants	0–1	Johnny Antonelli (14–4)	**Gene Conley** (7–6)	None	22,159	32–54
87	July 17	Dodgers	3–2	**Jim Owens** (5–8)	Roger Craig (4–1)	None	16,686	33–54
88	July 18	Dodgers	5–2	**Don Cardwell** (3–6)	Danny McDevitt (8–7)	None	8,132	34–54
89	July 19 (1)	Dodgers	4–8	Clem Labine (4–8)	**Ray Semproch** (3–7)	None	see 2nd game	34–55
90	July 19 (2)	Dodgers	3–2 (6)	**Taylor Phillips** (1–4)	Johnny Podres (8–6)	None	25,114	35–55
91	July 21	@ Pirates	4–2	**Robin Roberts** (9–8)	Bob Friend (4–12)	None	25,960	36–55
92	July 22	@ Pirates	11–4	**Gene Conley** (8–6)	Ron Kline (7–9)	None	17,024	37–55
93	July 24	@ Reds	2–1	**Jim Owens** (6–8)	Jay Hook (1–1)	**Ray Semproch** (3)	11,497	38–55
94	July 25	@ Reds	6–3	**Don Cardwell** (4–6)	Joe Nuxhall (3–9)	**Rubén Gómez** (1)	5,068	39–55
95	July 26 (1)	@ Reds	2–4	Brooks Lawrence (6–9)	**Robin Roberts** (9–9)	None	see 2nd game	39–56
96	July 26 (2)	@ Reds	6–3	**Gene Conley** (9–6)	Jim O'Toole (2–4)	None	15,557	40–56
97	July 28	@ Giants	3–2	**Jim Owens** (7–8)	Stu Miller (4–6)	None	15,350	41–56
98	July 29	@ Giants	3–1	**Don Cardwell** (5–6)	Johnny Antonelli (14–6)	None	10,865	42–56
99	July 30	@ Giants	2–7	Mike McCormick (10–8)	**Robin Roberts** (9–10)	None	10,114	42–57
100	July 31	@ Dodgers	4–5	Don Drysdale (14–6)	**Gene Conley** (9–7)	None	21,900	42–58

August (12–21–1)

#	Date	Opponent	Score	Win	Loss	Save	Attendance	Record
101	August 1	@ Dodgers	3–5	Clem Labine (5–8)	**Jim Owens** (7–9)	None	30,536	42–59
102	August 2	@ Dodgers	3–4	Larry Sherry (2–2)	**Don Cardwell** (5–7)	None	10,201	42–60
–	August 3	**1959 Major League Baseball All-Star Game at the Los Angeles Memorial Coliseum in Los Angeles**						
103	August 4	@ Cubs	2–1	**Robin Roberts** (10–10)	Bob Anderson (7–8)	None	8,348	43–60
104	August 5	@ Cubs	6–4	**Gene Conley** (10–7)	Bill Henry (6–5)	**Taylor Phillips** (1)	9,128	44–60
105	August 6	@ Cubs	2–4	Don Elston (6–4)	**Humberto Robinson** (2–2)	None	6,477	44–61
106	August 7	@ Cardinals	1–3	Lindy McDaniel (11–10)	**Rubén Gómez** (1–8)	None	8,764	44–62
107	August 8 (1)	@ Cardinals	3–4	Bob Miller (1–0)	**Robin Roberts** (10–11)	None	see 2nd game	44–63
108	August 8 (2)	@ Cardinals	4–5 (11)	Lindy McDaniel (12–10)	**Turk Farrell** (1–3)	None	11,296	44–64
109	August 9 (1)	@ Cardinals	8–3	**Gene Conley** (11–7)	Ernie Broglio (6–8)	None	see 2nd game	45–64
110	August 9 (2)	@ Cardinals	4–2	**Jim Owens** (8–9)	Marshall Bridges (4–3)	**Turk Farrell** (4)	20,129	46–64
111	August 11	Pirates	6–4	**Don Cardwell** (6–7)	Bob Friend (4–15)	**Turk Farrell** (5)	12,127	47–64
112	August 12	Pirates	2–6	Harvey Haddix (9–9)	**Robin Roberts** (10–12)	None	11,163	47–65
113	August 14 (1)	Reds	13–15	Brooks Lawrence (7–10)	**Turk Farrell** (1–4)	Jim Brosnan (4)	see 2nd game	47–66
114	August 14 (2)	Reds	4–5	Willard Schmidt (3–2)	**Jim Owens** (8–10)	Don Newcombe (1)	16,922	47–67
115	August 15	Reds	3–8	Joe Nuxhall (7–9)	**Ray Semproch** (3–8)	Orlando Peña (4)	3,886	47–68
116	August 16 (1)	Reds	8–5	**Robin Roberts** (11–12)	Bob Purkey (10–12)	None	see 2nd game	48–68
117	August 16 (2)	Reds	6–0	**Don Cardwell** (7–7)	Jay Hook (2–3)	None	10,921	49–68
118	August 17	Cardinals	4–5	Vinegar Bend Mizell (12–7)	**Ray Semproch** (3–9)	Lindy McDaniel (13)	6,178	49–69
119	August 18	Cardinals	2–1	**Jim Owens** (9–10)	Bob Miller (1–2)	None	8,641	50–69
120	August 19 (1)	Cubs	4–1	**Gene Conley** (12–7)	Glen Hobbie (12–10)	None	see 2nd game	51–69
121	August 19 (2)	Cubs	7–7 (12)	None	None	None	13,611	51–69–1
122	August 20 (1)	Cubs	8–5	**Rubén Gómez** (2–8)	Moe Drabowsky (5–10)	None	see 2nd game	52–69–1
123	August 20 (2)	Cubs	4–6	Bob Anderson (10–8)	**Taylor Phillips** (1–5)	Bill Henry (11)	7,929	52–70–1
124	August 21 (1)	Giants	0–6	Johnny Antonelli (17–7)	**Robin Roberts** (11–13)	None	see 2nd game	52–71–1
125	August 21 (2)	Giants	6–10	Mike McCormick (11–10)	**Ray Semproch** (3–10)	Stu Miller (7)	28,164	52–72–1
126	August 22	Giants	1–8	Al Worthington (2–2)	**Jim Owens** (9–11)	Gordon Jones (2)	9,888	52–73–1
–	August 23 (1)	Giants	Postponed (rain); Makeup: August 27 as a traditional double-header					
–	August 23 (2)	Giants	Postponed (rain); Makeup: August 27 as a traditional double-header					
127	August 24	Dodgers	2–8	Sandy Koufax (7–4)	**Ed Keegan** (0–1)	None	10,832	52–74–1
128	August 25	Dodgers	2–5	Johnny Podres (12–7)	**Robin Roberts** (11–14)	Larry Sherry (2)	18,140	52–75–1
129	August 27 (1)	Giants	7–2	**Jim Owens** (10–11)	Mike McCormick (11–11)	None	see 2nd game	53–75–1
130	August 27 (2)	Giants	2–1	**Don Cardwell** (8–7)	Al Worthington (2–3)	**Turk Farrell** (6)	14,538	54–75–1
131	August 28	@ Pirates	0–9	Vern Law (15–7)	**Ed Keegan** (0–2)	None	20,926	54–76–1
132	August 29	@ Pirates	1–11	Bob Friend (8–15)	**Robin Roberts** (11–15)	None	9,714	54–77–1
133	August 30 (1)	@ Pirates	1–2	Harvey Haddix (11–9)	**Humberto Robinson** (2–3)	None	see 2nd game	54–78–1
134	August 30 (2)	@ Pirates	6–7 (10)	Roy Face (17–0)	**Turk Farrell** (1–5)	None	20,015	54–79–1

September (10–11)

#	Date	Opponent	Score	Win	Loss	Save	Attendance	Record
135	September 1	@ Braves	5–3	**Don Cardwell** (9–7)	Bob Buhl (11–9)	None	20,522	55–79–1
136	September 2	@ Braves	11–5	**Robin Roberts** (12–15)	Lew Burdette (18–14)	None	18,047	56–79–1
137	September 4	Pirates	3–0	**Jim Owens** (11–11)	Harvey Haddix (11–10)	None	13,136	57–79–1
138	September 5	Pirates	6–7	Bob Porterfield (1–2)	**Turk Farrell** (1–6)	Bennie Daniels (1)	5,993	57–80–1
139	September 6	Pirates	2–1	**Robin Roberts** (13–15)	Vern Law (15–9)	None	9,684	58–80–1
140	September 7	@ Reds	6–4	**Rubén Gómez** (3–8)	Orlando Peña (4–8)	None	5,624	59–80–1
141	September 9	@ Dodgers	0–1	Don Drysdale (16–12)	**Taylor Phillips** (1–6)	None	13,877	59–81–1
142	September 10	@ Dodgers	0–5	Roger Craig (8–5)	**Don Cardwell** (9–8)	None	15,434	59–82–1
143	September 11	@ Giants	1–0	**Robin Roberts** (14–15)	Mike McCormick (11–14)	None	22,222	60–82–1
144	September 12	@ Giants	1–9	Sam Jones (20–12)	**Humberto Robinson** (2–4)	None	21,133	60–83–1
145	September 13	@ Giants	0–1	Jack Sanford (14–12)	**Don Cardwell** (9–9)	Mike McCormick (4)	21,841	60–84–1
146	September 15	@ Cardinals	4–6	Ernie Broglio (7–12)	**Ed Keegan** (0–3)	None	5,327	60–85–1
147	September 17	@ Cubs	5–2	**Robin Roberts** (15–15)	Glen Hobbie (15–13)	None	598	61–85–1
148	September 18	@ Cubs	4–5 (13)	Dave Hillman (7–11)	**Bob Bowman** (0–1)	None	971	61–86–1
149	September 19	Braves	3–9	Bob Buhl (14–9)	**Don Cardwell** (9–10)	None	17,216	61–87–1
150	September 20	Braves	5–8	Joey Jay (6–10)	**Robin Roberts** (15–16)	None	13,202	61–88–1
151	September 22 (1)	Reds	3–1	**Jim Owens** (12–11)	Orlando Peña (5–9)	None	see 2nd game	62–88–1
152	September 22 (2)	Reds	3–2	**Humberto Robinson** (3–4)	Bob Purkey (12–18)	**Jack Meyer** (1)	8,533	63–88–1
153	September 25	@ Braves	6–3	**Jack Meyer** (5–3)	Lew Burdette (21–15)	None	24,912	64–88–1
154	September 26	@ Braves	2–3	Warren Spahn (21–15)	**Robin Roberts** (15–17)	None	23,763	64–89–1
155	September 27	@ Braves	2–5	Bob Buhl (15–9)	**Jim Owens** (12–12)	Don McMahon (15)	48,642	64–90–1

^{^[a]}The second game on April 26 was protested by the Pirates in the top of the first inning. The protest was later denied.
^{^[b]}The second game on May 10 was suspended (Sunday curfew) in the bottom of the eighth inning with the score 4–6 and was completed July 21, 1959.

- Phillies win
- Phillies loss
- Phillies tie
- Postponement
- Bold: Phillies team member

=== Roster ===
1959 Philadelphia Phillies
**Roster**
**Pitchers**: 46 Don Cardwell; 29 Gene Conley; 43 Turk Farrell; 40,22 Rubén Gómez; 22 Jim Hearn; 50 Ed Keegan; 42 Jack Meyer; 44 Seth Morehead; 49 Jim Owens; 44 Taylor Phillips; 36 Robin Roberts; 34 Humberto Robinson; 41 Freddy Rodríguez; 33 Al Schroll; 48 Ray Semproch; 41 Chris Short; 28 Curt Simmons	**Catchers**: 38 Jim Hegan; 7 Joe Lonnett; 58,47 Carl Sawatski; 8 Valmy Thomas; **Infielders**: 45,2 Sparky Anderson; 5 Ed Bouchee; 17 Chico Fernández; 4 Gene Freese; 2 Granny Hamner; 20 Harry Hanebrink; 6 Willie Jones; 15 Joe Koppe	**Outfielders**: 9 Harry Anderson; 1 Richie Ashburn; 6 Jim Bolger; 10 Bob Bowman; 35 Solly Drake; 12 Dave Philley; 14 Wally Post; **Other batters**: 16 John Easton	**Manager**: 24 Eddie Sawyer; **Coaches**: 11 Benny Bengough; 21 Dick Carter; 51 Tom Ferrick; 39 Johnny Riddle; 31 Ken Silvestri

== Player stats ==
=== Batting ===
==== Starters by position ====
Note: Pos = Position; G = Games played; AB = At bats; H = Hits; Avg. = Batting average; HR = Home runs; RBI = Runs batted in

Pos	Player	G	AB	H	Avg.	HR	RBI
C	Carl Sawatski	74	198	58	.293	9	43
1B	Ed Bouchee	136	499	142	.285	15	74
2B	Sparky Anderson	152	477	104	.218	0	34
SS	Joe Koppe	126	422	110	.261	7	28
3B	Gene Freese	132	400	107	.268	23	70
LF	Harry Anderson	142	508	122	.240	14	63
CF	Richie Ashburn	153	564	150	.266	1	20
RF	Wally Post	132	468	119	.254	22	94

==== Other batters ====
Note: G = Games played; AB = At bats; H = Hits; Avg. = Batting average; HR = Home runs; RBI = Runs batted in

Player	G	AB	H	Avg.	HR	RBI
Dave Philley	99	254	74	.291	7	37
Willie Jones	47	160	43	.269	7	24
Valmy Thomas	66	140	28	.200	1	7
Chico Fernández	45	123	26	.211	0	3
Harry Hanebrink	57	97	25	.258	1	7
Joe Lonnett	43	93	16	.172	1	10
Bob Bowman	57	79	10	.127	2	5
Granny Hamner	21	64	19	.297	2	6
Solly Drake	67	62	9	.145	0	3
Jim Hegan	25	51	10	.196	0	8
Jim Bolger	35	48	4	.083	0	1
John Easton	3	3	0	.000	0	0

=== Pitching ===
==== Starting pitchers ====
Note: G = Games pitched; IP = Innings pitched; W = Wins; L = Losses; ERA = Earned run average; SO = Strikeouts

Player	G	IP	W	L	ERA	SO
Robin Roberts	35	257.1	15	17	4.27	137
Jim Owens	31	221.1	12	12	3.21	135
Gene Conley	25	180.0	12	7	3.00	102
Don Cardwell	25	153.0	9	10	4.06	106

==== Other pitchers ====
Note: G = Games pitched; IP = Innings pitched; W = Wins; L = Losses; ERA = Earned run average; SO = Strikeouts

Player	G	IP	W	L	ERA	SO
Ray Semproch	30	111.2	3	10	5.40	54
Rubén Gómez	20	72.1	3	8	6.10	37
Chris Short	3	14.1	0	0	8.16	8
Seth Morehead	3	10.0	0	2	9.90	8
Ed Keegan	3	9.0	0	3	18.00	3

==== Relief pitchers ====
Note: G = Games pitched; W = Wins; L = Losses; SV = Saves; ERA = Earned run average; SO = Strikeouts

Player	G	W	L	SV	ERA	SO
Turk Farrell	38	1	6	6	4.74	31
Jack Meyer	47	5	3	1	3.36	71
Taylor Phillips	32	1	4	1	5.00	35
Humberto Robinson	31	2	4	0	3.33	32
Curt Simmons	7	0	0	0	4.50	4
Jim Hearn	6	0	2	0	5.73	1
Bob Bowman	5	0	1	0	6.00	0
Al Schroll	3	1	1	0	8.68	4
Freddy Rodríguez	1	0	0	0	13.50	1

== Farm system ==
Level	Team	League	Manager
AAA	Buffalo Bisons	International League	Kerby Farrell
A	Williamsport Grays	Eastern League	Frank Lucchesi
A	Asheville Tourists	Sally League	Clyde McCullough
B	Des Moines Demons	Illinois–Indiana–Iowa League	Chuck Kress
C	Bakersfield Bears	California League	Paul Owens
D	Johnson City Phillies	Appalachian League	Eddie Lyons
D	Tampa Tarpons	Florida State League	Charlie Gassaway
D	Elmira Pioneers	New York–Penn League	Andy Seminick
