= 1959 St. Louis Cardinals season =

Major League Baseball season

1959 St. Louis Cardinals
- League: National League
- Ballpark: Busch Stadium I
- City: St. Louis, Missouri
- Record: 71–83 (.461)
- League place: 7th
- Owners: August "Gussie" Busch
- General managers: Bing Devine
- Managers: Solly Hemus
- Television: KPLR
- Radio: KMOX (Harry Caray, Jack Buck, Joe Garagiola)

The 1959 St. Louis Cardinals season was the team's 78th season in St. Louis, Missouri and its 68th season in the National League. The Cardinals went 71–83 during the season and finished seventh in the National League, 16 games behind the NL pennant winner and World Champion Los Angeles Dodgers. They attracted 929,953 paying fans to Busch Stadium, fifth in the eight-team league.

== Offseason ==
- September 29, 1958: One day after the end of the 1958 National League regular season, Gene Freese was traded by the Cardinals to the Philadelphia Phillies for Solly Hemus. The 35-year-old Hemus, a ten-year MLB veteran, had begun his career as a Cardinal, playing in 684 games between 1949 and 1956. He had appeared in 85 games as a second baseman for the 1958 Phillies, but was immediately named the Redbirds' player-manager for 1959, succeeding interim skipper Stan Hack.
- October 8, 1958: Hobie Landrith, Billy Muffett and Benny Valenzuela were traded by the Cardinals to the San Francisco Giants for Marv Grissom and Ernie Broglio.
- October 15, 1958: Marshall Bridges was purchased by the Cardinals from the Sacramento Solons.
- December 1, 1958: Johnny O'Brien was drafted from the Cardinals by the Philadelphia Phillies in the 1958 rule 5 draft.
- December 3, 1958: Rubén Amaro was traded by the Cardinals to the Philadelphia Phillies for Chuck Essegian.
- December 4, 1958: Wally Moon and Phil Paine were traded by the Cardinals to the Los Angeles Dodgers for Gino Cimoli.
- March 25, 1959: Sam Jones and Don Choate were traded by the Cardinals to the San Francisco Giants for Ray Jablonski and Bill White.
- Prior to 1959 season (exact date unknown)
  - Lee Gregory was signed as an amateur free agent by the Cardinals.

== Regular season ==
=== Season summary ===
The Cardinals played the league's best baseball from early May into late July, during which time they went 40–30. In the end, pitching failed the Redbirds. Their 4.34 ERA was ranked worst in the National League.

There were some bright spots to the season. Larry Jackson and Lindy McDaniel, who found success and saved 15 games after an early-season move to the bullpen, each won a team-high 14 games. Also, third baseman Ken Boyer won a Gold Glove this year.

Right fielder Joe Cunningham led the National League in on-base percentage at .453 and batted .345 to finish second to Hank Aaron for the National League batting title.

=== Season standings ===
National League
Team	W	L	Pct.	GB	Home	Road
Los Angeles Dodgers	88	68	.564	—	46‍–‍32	42‍–‍36
Milwaukee Braves	86	70	.551	2	49‍–‍29	37‍–‍41
San Francisco Giants	83	71	.539	4	42‍–‍35	41‍–‍36
Pittsburgh Pirates	78	76	.506	9	47‍–‍30	31‍–‍46
Chicago Cubs	74	80	.481	13	38‍–‍39	36‍–‍41
Cincinnati Reds	74	80	.481	13	43‍–‍34	31‍–‍46
St. Louis Cardinals	71	83	.461	16	42‍–‍35	29‍–‍48
Philadelphia Phillies	64	90	.416	23	37‍–‍40	27‍–‍50

=== Record vs. opponents ===
1959 National League record Sources:
Team	CHC	CIN	LAD	MIL	PHI	PIT	SF	STL
Chicago	—	9–13	11–11	10–12	10–12–1	12–10	12–10	10–12
Cincinnati	13–9	—	13–9	11–11	9–13	9–13	8–14	11–11
Los Angeles	11–11	9–13	—	14–10	17–5	11–11	14–8	12–10
Milwaukee	12–10	11–11	10–14	—	13–9	15–7–1	12–10	13–9
Philadelphia	12–10–1	13–9	5–17	9–13	—	9–13	9–13	7–15
Pittsburgh	10–12	13–9	11–11	7–15–1	13–9	—	10–12	14–8
San Francisco	10–12	14–8	8–14	10–12	13–9	12–10	—	16–6
St. Louis	12–10	11–11	10–12	9–13	15–7	8–14	6–16	—

=== Notable transactions ===
- June 8, 1959: Jim Brosnan was traded by the Cardinals to the Cincinnati Reds for Hal Jeffcoat.
- June 19, 1959: Solly Hemus was released by the Cardinals as an active player; he remained the team's manager.
- July 25, 1959: Jay Porter was selected off waivers by the Cardinals from the Washington Senators.
- August 4, 1959: Ray Katt was released by the Cardinals.
- August 20, 1959: Ray Jablonski was selected off waivers from the Cardinals by the Kansas City Athletics.
- September 6, 1959: Phil Gagliano was signed as an amateur free agent by the Cardinals.

=== Roster ===
1959 St. Louis Cardinals
Roster
Pitchers: 24 Bob Blaylock; 44 Gary Blaylock; 30 Marshall Bridges; 32 Ernie Broglio; 37 Jim Brosnan; 38 Tom Cheney; 36 Phil Clark; 24 Bob Duliba; 58 Bob Gibson; 42 Marv Grissom; 38 Tom Hughes; 39 Larry Jackson; 36 Hal Jeffcoat; 34 Alex Kellner; 41 Lindy McDaniel; 49 Bob Miller; 33 Vinegar Bend Mizell; 57 Howie Nunn; 47 Dick Ricketts; 30 Bill Smith; 45 Dean Stone; 24 Jack Urban	Catchers: 9 Ray Katt; 51 Tim McCarver; 44 J. W. Porter; 2 Hal Smith; Infielders: 11 Don Blasingame; 14 Ken Boyer; 18 George Crowe; 10 Alex Grammas; 27 Dick Gray; 7 Solly Hemus; 16 Ray Jablonski; 6 Stan Musial; 25 Wally Shannon; 19 Lee Tate	Outfielders: 20 Duke Carmel; 22 Gino Cimoli; 15 Joe Cunningham; 20 Joe Durham; 29 Chuck Essegian; 21 Curt Flood; 1 Gene Green; 25 Chick King; 25 Irv Noren; 29 Gene Oliver; 24 Bobby Gene Smith; 12,26 Bill White; Other batters: 25 Charlie O'Rourke	Manager: 7 Solly Hemus; Coaches: 9 Ray Katt; 5 Johnny Keane; 4 Howie Pollet; 3 Harry Walker

== Player stats ==
=== Batting ===
==== Starters by position ====
Note: Pos = Position; G = Games played; AB = At bats; H = Hits; Avg. = Batting average; HR = Home runs; RBI = Runs batted in

Pos	Player	G	AB	H	Avg.	HR	RBI
C	Hal R. Smith	142	452	122	.270	13	50
1B	Stan Musial	115	341	87	.255	14	44
2B	Don Blasingame	150	615	178	.289	1	24
SS	Alex Grammas	131	368	99	.269	3	30
3B	Ken Boyer	149	563	174	.309	28	94
LF	Bill White	138	517	156	.302	12	72
CF	Gino Cimoli	143	519	145	.279	8	72
RF	Joe Cunningham	144	458	158	.345	7	60

==== Other batters ====
Note: G = Games played; AB = At bats; H = Hits; Avg. = Batting average; HR = Home runs; RBI = Runs batted in

Player	G	AB	H	Avg.	HR	RBI
Curt Flood	121	208	53	.255	7	26
Gene Oliver	68	172	42	.244	6	28
George Crowe	77	103	31	.301	8	29
Wally Shannon	47	95	27	.284	0	5
Ray Jablonski	60	87	22	.253	3	14
Gene Green	30	74	14	.189	1	3
Bobby Smith	43	60	13	.217	1	7
Dick Gray	36	51	16	.314	1	6
Lee Tate	41	50	7	.140	1	4
Chuck Essegian	17	39	7	.179	0	5
Jay Porter	23	33	7	.212	1	2
Tim McCarver	8	24	4	.167	0	0
Ray Katt	15	24	7	.292	0	2
Duke Carmel	10	23	3	.130	0	3
Solly Hemus	24	17	4	.235	0	1
Irv Noren	8	8	1	.125	0	0
Chick King	5	7	3	.429	0	1
Joe Durham	6	5	0	.000	0	0
Charlie O'Rourke	2	2	0	.000	0	0

=== Pitching ===
==== Starting pitchers ====
Note: G = Games pitched; IP = Innings pitched; W = Wins; L = Losses; ERA = Earned run average; SO = Strikeouts

Player	G	IP	W	L	ERA	SO
Larry Jackson	40	256.0	14	13	3.30	145
Vinegar Bend Mizell	31	201.1	13	10	4.20	108
Ernie Broglio	35	181.1	7	12	4.72	133
Bob Gibson	13	75.2	3	5	3.33	48
Bob Miller	11	70.2	4	3	3.31	43
Tom Hughes	2	4.0	0	2	15.75	2

==== Other pitchers ====
Note: G = Games pitched; IP = Innings pitched; W = Wins; L = Losses; ERA = Earned run average; SO = Strikeouts

Player	G	IP	W	L	ERA	SO
Gary Blaylock	26	100.0	4	5	5.13	61
Dick Ricketts	12	55.2	1	6	5.82	25
Alex Kellner	12	37.0	2	1	3.16	19
Tom Cheney	11	11.2	0	1	6.94	8
Bob Blaylock	3	9.0	0	1	4.00	3

==== Relief pitchers ====
Note: G = Games pitched; W = Wins; L = Losses; SV = Saves; ERA = Earned run average; SO = Strikeouts

Player	G	W	L	SV	ERA	SO
Lindy McDaniel	62	14	12	16	3.82	86
Marshall Bridges	27	6	3	1	4.26	76
Jim Brosnan	20	1	3	2	4.91	18
Dean Stone	18	0	1	1	4.20	17
Howie Nunn	16	2	2	0	7.59	20
Bob Duliba	11	0	1	1	2.78	14
Hal Jeffcoat	11	0	1	0	9.17	7
Jack Urban	8	0	0	0	9.28	4
Phil Clark	7	0	1	0	12.86	5
Bill Smith	6	0	0	1	1.08	4
Marv Grissom	3	0	0	0	22.50	0

== Farm system ==
Level	Team	League	Manager
AAA	Omaha Cardinals	American Association	Joe Schultz
AAA	Rochester Red Wings	International League	Cot Deal and Clyde King
AA	Tulsa Oilers	Texas League	Vern Benson
A	York White Roses	Eastern League	Mike Ryba and Ed Lyons
B	Winston-Salem Red Birds	Carolina League	Al Unser
C	Winnipeg Goldeyes	Northern League	Chase Riddle
C	Billings Mustangs	Pioneer League	Whitey Kurowski
D	Dothan Cardinals	Alabama–Florida League	J. C. Dunn
D	Wytheville Cardinals	Appalachian League	Don Pries
D	Daytona Beach Islanders	Florida State League	Homer Ray Wilson
D	Keokuk Cardinals	Midwest League	Frank Calo
D	Hobbs Cardinals	Sophomore League	Thurman Tucker

LEAGUE CHAMPIONS: Winnipeg, Billings
