= 1959 San Francisco Giants season =

1959 San Francisco Giants
- League: National League
- Ballpark: Seals Stadium
- City: San Francisco, California
- Record: 83–71 (.539)
- League place: 3rd
- Owners: Horace Stoneham
- General managers: Chub Feeney
- Managers: Bill Rigney
- Television: KTVU (Russ Hodges, Lon Simmons)
- Radio: KSFO (Russ Hodges, Lon Simmons, Bill King)

The 1959 San Francisco Giants season was the Giants' 77th year in Major League Baseball and their second season in San Francisco since their move from New York following the 1957 season. The team finished in third place in the National League with an 83–71 record, 4 games behind the World Champion Los Angeles Dodgers. It was the team's second and final season at Seals Stadium before moving their games to Candlestick Park the following season.

== Offseason ==
- October 8, 1958: Marv Grissom and Ernie Broglio were traded by the Giants to the St. Louis Cardinals for Hobie Landrith, Billy Muffett and Benny Valenzuela.
- December 3, 1958: Rubén Gómez and Valmy Thomas were traded by the Giants to the Philadelphia Phillies for Jack Sanford.
- December 5, 1958: Joey Amalfitano was released by the Giants.
- March 25, 1959: Ray Jablonski and Bill White were traded by the Giants to the St. Louis Cardinals for Sam Jones and Don Choate.

== Regular season ==
In his major league debut on July 30, Willie McCovey went four-for-four against future Hall-of-Famer Robin Roberts en route to a .354 batting average. McCovey went on to win National League Rookie of the Year honors while playing in just 52 games.

=== Season standings ===
National League
Team	W	L	Pct.	GB	Home	Road
Los Angeles Dodgers	88	68	.564	—	46‍–‍32	42‍–‍36
Milwaukee Braves	86	70	.551	2	49‍–‍29	37‍–‍41
San Francisco Giants	83	71	.539	4	42‍–‍35	41‍–‍36
Pittsburgh Pirates	78	76	.506	9	47‍–‍30	31‍–‍46
Chicago Cubs	74	80	.481	13	38‍–‍39	36‍–‍41
Cincinnati Reds	74	80	.481	13	43‍–‍34	31‍–‍46
St. Louis Cardinals	71	83	.461	16	42‍–‍35	29‍–‍48
Philadelphia Phillies	64	90	.416	23	37‍–‍40	27‍–‍50

=== Record vs. opponents ===
1959 National League record Sources:
Team	CHC	CIN	LAD	MIL	PHI	PIT	SF	STL
Chicago	—	9–13	11–11	10–12	10–12–1	12–10	12–10	10–12
Cincinnati	13–9	—	13–9	11–11	9–13	9–13	8–14	11–11
Los Angeles	11–11	9–13	—	14–10	17–5	11–11	14–8	12–10
Milwaukee	12–10	11–11	10–14	—	13–9	15–7–1	12–10	13–9
Philadelphia	12–10–1	13–9	5–17	9–13	—	9–13	9–13	7–15
Pittsburgh	10–12	13–9	11–11	7–15–1	13–9	—	10–12	14–8
San Francisco	10–12	14–8	8–14	10–12	13–9	12–10	—	16–6
St. Louis	12–10	11–11	10–12	9–13	15–7	8–14	6–16	—

=== Opening Day starters ===
- Johnny Antonelli
- Jackie Brandt
- Orlando Cepeda
- Jim Davenport
- Willie Kirkland
- Willie Mays
- Andre Rodgers
- Bob Schmidt
- Daryl Spencer

=== Notable transactions ===
- July 26, 1959: Billy Muffett and cash were traded by the Giants to the Boston Red Sox for Bud Byerly.
- August 25, 1959: Hank Sauer was released by the Giants.

=== Roster ===
1959 San Francisco Giants
Roster
Pitchers: 43 Johnny Antonelli; 39 Curt Barclay; 36 Bud Byerly; 39 Eddie Fisher; 38 Gordon Jones; 19 Sam Jones; 40 Mike McCormick; 37 Stu Miller; 36 Billy Muffett; 28 Marshall Renfroe; 33 Jack Sanford; 42 Joe Shipley; 32 Al Worthington; 34 Dom Zanni	Catchers: 27 Jim Hegan; 5 Hobie Landrith; 8 Roger McCardell; 9 Bob Schmidt; Infielders: 16 Ed Bressoud; 30 Orlando Cepeda; 12 Jim Davenport; 44 Willie McCovey; 22 Danny O'Connell; 10 José Pagán; 15,17 Andre Rodgers; 20 Daryl Spencer	Outfielders: 23 Felipe Alou; 25 Jackie Brandt; 28 Willie Kirkland; 24 Willie Mays; 6 Hank Sauer; 39 Leon Wagner; Other batters: 26 Dusty Rhodes; 26 Bob Speake	Manager: 18 Bill Rigney; Coaches: 2 Salty Parker; 1 Bill Posedel; 6 Hank Sauer; 3 Wes Westrum

== Player stats ==
=== Batting ===
==== Starters by position ====
Note: Pos = Position; G = Games played; AB = At bats; H = Hits; Avg. = Batting average; HR = Home runs; RBI = Runs batted in

Pos	Player	G	AB	H	Avg.	HR	RBI
C	Hobie Landrith	109	283	71	.251	3	29
1B	Orlando Cepeda	151	605	192	.317	27	105
2B	Daryl Spencer	152	555	147	.265	12	62
SS	Ed Bressoud	104	315	79	.251	9	26
3B	Jim Davenport	123	469	121	.258	6	38
LF	Jackie Brandt	137	429	116	.270	12	57
CF	Willie Mays	151	575	180	.313	34	104
RF	Willie Kirkland	126	463	126	.272	22	68

==== Other batters ====
Note: G = Games played; AB = At bats; H = Hits; Avg. = Batting average; HR = Home runs; RBI = Runs batted in

Player	G	AB	H	Avg.	HR	RBI
Felipe Alou	95	247	68	.275	10	33
Andre Rodgers	71	228	57	.250	6	24
Willie McCovey	52	192	68	.354	13	38
Bob Schmidt	71	181	44	.243	5	20
Leon Wagner	87	129	29	.225	5	22
Danny O'Connell	34	58	11	.190	0	0
Dusty Rhodes	54	48	9	.188	0	7
José Pagán	31	46	8	.174	0	1
Jim Hegan	21	30	4	.133	0	0
Hank Sauer	13	15	1	.067	1	1
Bob Speake	15	11	1	.091	0	1
Roger McCardell	4	4	0	.000	0	0

=== Pitching ===
==== Starting pitchers ====
Note: G = Games pitched; IP = Innings pitched; W = Wins; L = Losses; ERA = Earned run average; SO = Strikeouts

Player	G	IP	W	L	ERA	SO
Johnny Antonelli	40	282.0	19	10	3.10	165
Sam Jones	50	270.2	21	15	2.83	209
Jack Sanford	36	222.1	15	12	3.16	132
Marshall Renfroe	1	2.0	0	0	27.00	3

==== Other pitchers ====
Note: G = Games pitched; IP = Innings pitched; W = Wins; L = Losses; ERA = Earned run average; SO = Strikeouts

Player	G	IP	W	L	ERA	SO
Mike McCormick	47	225.2	12	16	3.99	151
Stu Miller	59	167.2	8	7	2.84	95
Eddie Fisher	17	40.0	2	6	7.88	15

==== Relief pitchers ====
Note: G = Games pitched; W = Wins; L = Losses; SV = Saves; ERA = Earned run average; SO = Strikeouts

Player	G	W	L	SV	ERA	SO
Al Worthington	42	2	3	3	3.68	45
Gordon Jones	31	3	2	2	4.33	29
Bud Byerly	11	1	0	0	1.38	4
Joe Shipley	10	0	0	0	4.50	11
Dom Zanni	9	0	0	0	6.55	11
Billy Muffett	5	0	0	0	5.40	3
Curt Barclay	1	0	0	0	54.00	0

== Awards and honors ==
- Willie McCovey – National League Rookie of the Year

All-Star Game (first game) All-Star Game (second game)

== Farm system ==
Level	Team	League	Manager
AAA	Phoenix Giants	Pacific Coast League	Red Davis
AA	Corpus Christi Giants	Texas League	Ray Murray
A	Springfield Giants	Eastern League	Andy Gilbert
B	Eugene Emeralds	Northwest League	Roy Partee
C	Fresno Giants	California League	Mike McCormick
C	St. Cloud Rox	Northern League	Richie Klaus
D	Michigan City White Caps	Midwest League	Buddy Kerr
D	Hastings Giants	Nebraska State League	Leo Schrall
D	Artesia Giants	Sophomore League	Jodie Phipps

LEAGUE CHAMPIONS: Springfield
