= Gomez incident =

The Gomez incident may refer to:

- A 1953 incident in which Rubén Gómez (baseball) hit batter Carl Furillo with a pitch
- An assault by Sultan Iskandar of Johor in November 1992
