= 1959 Milwaukee Braves season =

1959 Milwaukee Braves
- League: National League
- Ballpark: Milwaukee County Stadium
- City: Milwaukee, Wisconsin
- Record: 86–70 (.551)
- League place: 2nd
- Owners: Lou Perini
- General managers: John McHale
- Managers: Fred Haney
- Radio: WEMP; WTMJ (Earl Gillespie, Blaine Walsh)

The 1959 Milwaukee Braves season was the seventh season for the franchise in Milwaukee and its 89th season overall. The season's home attendance was 1,749,112, second in the majors and the eight-team National League, but the lowest to date in Milwaukee and the last over 1.5 million.

The Braves ended the National League regular season in a first-place tie with the Los Angeles Dodgers at 86–68 (.558), a special best-of-three tie-breaking series was played to decide the NL championship for the World Series. The Braves lost both games by one run, and finished at 86–70, two games behind the Dodgers, who won the World Series in six games over the Chicago White Sox.

== Offseason ==
- December 1, 1958: Claude Raymond was drafted from the Braves by the Chicago White Sox in the 1958 rule 5 draft.
- March 31, 1959: Gene Conley, Harry Hanebrink and Joe Koppe were traded by the Braves to the Philadelphia Phillies for Johnny O'Brien, Ted Kazanski, and Stan Lopata.

=== Front-office turnover ===
Three days after the conclusion of the World Series in 1958, which the Braves lost in seven games to the New York Yankees, the club announced a reorganization of its front office. Team president Joseph Cairnes stepped aside, and was succeeded by former Cincinnati Redlegs manager Birdie Tebbetts, 46. Named executive vice president, and ranked just below owner Louis Perini on the Braves' organizational chart, Tebbetts had never before served in a front-office capacity in baseball.

The repercussions of Tebbetts' appointment to a senior management post were felt three months later when general manager John J. Quinn, 50, a member of the team's front office since 1936 (as well as the son of former owner J. A. Robert Quinn) and the Braves' GM since 1945, resigned on January 14, 1959, to take the reins of the Philadelphia Phillies. Quinn was replaced in Milwaukee by Tebbetts' former teammate with the Detroit Tigers, 37-year-old John McHale, GM of the Tigers since 1957. McHale would serve as the Braves' general manager and, later, team president, through the club's final years in Milwaukee and its 1966 move to Atlanta, before his dismissal that year.

== Regular season ==
=== Batting ===
Right fielder Hank Aaron won the National League batting championship with a career-high .355 batting average. He also led the league in hits with 223, total bases with 400—both also career highs—and slugging percentage at .636. Aaron finished third in the voting for the National League Most Valuable Player award. Aaron also led the Braves with 154 games played, 629 at bats, and 123 runs batted in.

Third baseman Eddie Mathews led the NL with 46 home runs and had a career-high 182 hits, and he led the National League. He also led the team with 118 runs scored, had 182 hits and drove in 114 runs. Mathews finished second to Ernie Banks of the Chicago Cubs in the voting for the league's Most Valuable Player, who hit 47 home runs and lead the league in runs batted in. The choice was controversial, as the Cubs finished in last place, but Aaron and Mathews split the voting among Braves players, allowing Banks to claim the award.

=== Pitching ===
Warren Spahn and Lew Burdette led the National League pitchers with 21 wins apiece, and they had identical 21–15 win–loss records in carrying the Braves on their backs for most of the season. Spahn, who was the starting pitcher in the All-Star Game, pitched 292 innings, and Burdette pitched 289.2 innings. Third starter Bob Buhl returned from a season full of injuries to pitch 198 innings and finish with a good 15–9 record.

The star of the bullpen was relief pitcher Don McMahon, who pitched in 60 games (finishing 49), had a 5–3 record, a 2.57 earned run average, and saved 15 games. McMahon was also chosen for the All-Star Game.

=== Season highlights ===
On May 26, Harvey Haddix of the Pittsburgh Pirates pitched a perfect game through 12 innings of a game against the Braves. Haddix retired the first 36 consecutive batters, but lost the game 1–0 in the 13th inning. Félix Mantilla broke up the perfect game in the 13th inning. Braves pitcher Lew Burdette also pitched a shutout for all thirteen innings, giving up 12 hits and no walks.

=== Season standings ===
National League
Team	W	L	Pct.	GB	Home	Road
Los Angeles Dodgers	88	68	.564	—	46‍–‍32	42‍–‍36
Milwaukee Braves	86	70	.551	2	49‍–‍29	37‍–‍41
San Francisco Giants	83	71	.539	4	42‍–‍35	41‍–‍36
Pittsburgh Pirates	78	76	.506	9	47‍–‍30	31‍–‍46
Chicago Cubs	74	80	.481	13	38‍–‍39	36‍–‍41
Cincinnati Reds	74	80	.481	13	43‍–‍34	31‍–‍46
St. Louis Cardinals	71	83	.461	16	42‍–‍35	29‍–‍48
Philadelphia Phillies	64	90	.416	23	37‍–‍40	27‍–‍50

- Includes best-of-three tie-breaking series

=== Record vs. opponents ===
1959 National League record Sources:
Team	CHC	CIN	LAD	MIL	PHI	PIT	SF	STL
Chicago	—	9–13	11–11	10–12	10–12–1	12–10	12–10	10–12
Cincinnati	13–9	—	13–9	11–11	9–13	9–13	8–14	11–11
Los Angeles	11–11	9–13	—	14–10	17–5	11–11	14–8	12–10
Milwaukee	12–10	11–11	10–14	—	13–9	15–7–1	12–10	13–9
Philadelphia	12–10–1	13–9	5–17	9–13	—	9–13	9–13	7–15
Pittsburgh	10–12	13–9	11–11	7–15–1	13–9	—	10–12	14–8
San Francisco	10–12	14–8	8–14	10–12	13–9	12–10	—	16–6
St. Louis	12–10	11–11	10–12	9–13	15–7	8–14	6–16	—

=== Notable transactions ===
- April 11, 1959: Humberto Robinson was traded by the Braves to the Cleveland Indians for Mickey Vernon.
- May 11, 1959: Claude Raymond was returned to the Braves by the Chicago White Sox.
- May 26, 1959: Phil Roof was signed as an amateur free agent by the Braves.
- July 19, 1959: Len Gabrielson was signed as an amateur free agent by the Braves.
- August 20, 1959: Ray Boone was selected off waivers by the Braves from the Kansas City Athletics.
- August 26, 1959: Del Rice was released by the Braves as an active player and signed as a coach.
- September 11, 1959: Enos Slaughter was selected off waivers by the Braves from the New York Yankees.
- October 24, 1959: Rico Carty was signed by the Braves as an amateur free agent.

=== Roster ===
1959 Milwaukee Braves
Roster
Pitchers: 10 Bob Buhl; 33 Lew Burdette; 32 Bob Giggie; 31 Bob Hartman; 47 Joey Jay; 20 Don McMahon; 34 Juan Pizarro; 17 Bob Rush; 21 Warren Spahn; 30 Bob Trowbridge; 16 Carl Willey	Catchers: 1 Del Crandall; 6 Stan Lopata; 7 Del Rice; Infielders: 9 Joe Adcock; 11 Bobby Ávila; 19 Ray Boone; 13 Chuck Cottier; 23 Johnny Logan; 18 Félix Mantilla; 41 Eddie Mathews; 19 Joe Morgan; 11 Johnny O'Brien; 12 Mel Roach; 4 Red Schoendienst; 14 Frank Torre; 15 Mickey Vernon; 19 Casey Wise	Outfielders: 44 Hank Aaron; 38 Bill Bruton; 43 Wes Covington; 29 John DeMerit; 24 Lee Maye; 48 Andy Pafko; 24 Jim Pisoni; 25 Enos Slaughter; 25 Al Spangler	Manager: 2 Fred Haney; Coaches: 3 John Fitzpatrick; 8 Billy Herman; 7 Del Rice; 35 George Susce; 5 Whit Wyatt

== Player stats ==
=== Batting ===
==== Starters by position ====
Note: Pos = Position; G = Games played; AB = At bats; H = Hits; Avg. = Batting average; HR = Home runs; RBI = Runs batted in

Pos	Player	G	AB	H	Avg.	HR	RBI
C	Del Crandall	150	518	133	.257	21	72
1B	Joe Adcock	115	404	118	.292	25	76
2B	Bobby Ávila	51	172	41	.238	3	19
SS	Johnny Logan	138	470	137	.291	13	50
3B	Eddie Mathews	148	594	182	.306	46	114
LF	Wes Covington	103	373	104	.279	7	45
CF	Bill Bruton	133	478	138	.289	6	41
RF	Hank Aaron	154	629	223	.355	39	123

==== Other batters ====
Note: G = Games played; AB = At bats; H = Hits; Avg. = Batting average; HR = Home runs; RBI = Runs batted in

Player	G	AB	H	Avg.	HR	RBI
Frank Torre	115	263	60	.228	1	33
Félix Mantilla	103	251	54	.215	3	19
Andy Pafko	71	142	31	.218	1	15
Lee Maye	51	140	42	.300	4	16
Johnny O'Brien	44	116	23	.198	1	8
Mickey Vernon	74	91	20	.220	3	14
Casey Wise	22	76	13	.171	1	5
Stan Lopata	25	48	5	.104	0	4
Mel Roach	19	31	3	.097	0	0
Del Rice	13	29	6	.207	0	1
Chuck Cottier	10	24	3	.125	0	1
Jim Pisoni	9	24	4	.167	0	0
Joe Morgan	13	23	5	.217	0	1
Enos Slaughter	11	18	3	.167	0	1
Ray Boone	13	15	3	.200	1	2
Al Spangler	6	12	5	.417	0	0
John DeMerit	11	5	1	.200	0	0
Red Schoendienst	5	3	0	.000	0	0

=== Pitching ===
==== Starting pitchers ====
Note: G = Games pitched; IP = Innings pitched; W = Wins; L = Losses; ERA = Earned run average; SO = Strikeouts

Player	G	IP	W	L	ERA	SO
Warren Spahn	40	292.0	21	15	2.96	111
Lew Burdette	41	289.2	21	15	4.07	105
Bob Buhl	31	198.0	15	9	2.86	105

==== Other pitchers ====
Note: G = Games pitched; IP = Innings pitched; W = Wins; L = Losses; ERA = Earned run average; SO = Strikeouts

Player	G	IP	W	L	ERA	SO
Joey Jay	34	136.1	6	11	4.09	88
Juan Pizarro	29	133.2	6	2	3.77	126
Carl Willey	26	117.0	5	9	4.15	51
Bob Rush	31	101.1	5	6	2.40	64

==== Relief pitchers ====
Note: G = Games pitched; W = Wins; L = Losses; SV = Saves; ERA = Earned run average; SO = Strikeouts

Player	G	W	L	SV	ERA	SO
Don McMahon	60	5	3	15	2.57	55
Bob Trowbridge	16	1	0	1	5.93	22
Bob Giggie	13	1	0	1	4.05	15
Bob Hartman	3	0	0	0	27.00	1

== Farm system ==
Level	Team	League	Manager
AAA	Louisville Colonels	American Association	Ben Geraghty
AAA	Sacramento Solons	Pacific Coast League	Bob Elliott
AA	Atlanta Crackers	Southern Association	Bud Bates and Bob Montag
AA	Austin Senators	Texas League	Ernie White
A	Jacksonville Braves	Sally League	Sibby Sisti
B	Cedar Rapids Braves	Illinois–Indiana–Iowa League	Alex Monchak
B	Yakima Bears	Northwest League	Hub Kittle
C	Eau Claire Braves	Northern League	Travis Jackson, Bobby Dudley and Gordon Maltzberger
C	Boise Braves	Pioneer League	Billy Smith
D	McCook Braves	Nebraska State League	Bill Steinecke
D	Wellsville Braves	New York–Penn League	Harry Minor
D	Midland Braves	Sophomore League	Jimmy Brown

LEAGUE CHAMPIONS: Austin, Yakima, McCook, Wellsville
