= 1959 Pittsburgh Pirates season =

1959 Pittsburgh Pirates
- League: National League
- Ballpark: Forbes Field
- City: Pittsburgh, Pennsylvania
- Owners: John W. Galbreath (majority shareholder); Bing Crosby, Thomas P. Johnson (minority shareholders)
- General managers: Joe L. Brown
- Managers: Danny Murtaugh
- Television: KDKA-TV; Bob Prince, Jim Woods
- Radio: KDKA; Bob Prince, Paul Long, Jim Woods

The 1959 Major League Baseball season saw the Pittsburgh Pirates finish in fourth place in the National League at 78–76, nine games behind the NL and World Series Champion Los Angeles Dodgers. The Pirates set the record for most extra innings victories in a season, winning 19 of their 21 extra inning games.

== Offseason ==
- January 30, 1959: Whammy Douglas, Jim Pendleton, Frank Thomas, and John Powers were traded by the Pirates to the Cincinnati Reds for Smoky Burgess, Harvey Haddix and Don Hoak.
- Prior to 1959 season: Dick Rand was traded by the Pirates to the St. Louis Cardinals for Tom Burgess.

== Regular season ==
- May 26, 1959: Harvey Haddix took a perfect game into the 13th inning of a game against the Milwaukee Braves. Haddix retired 36 consecutive batters in 12 innings, but lost the game 1–0. Braves pitcher Lew Burdette also pitched a shutout for 13 full innings, giving up 12 hits. NOTE: On September 4, 1991, MLB redefined no-hitters to no longer include games in which the first hit was surrendered in extra innings. Until then, Haddix had been credited with a perfect game.

=== Season standings ===
National League
Team	W	L	Pct.	GB	Home	Road
Los Angeles Dodgers	88	68	.564	—	46‍–‍32	42‍–‍36
Milwaukee Braves	86	70	.551	2	49‍–‍29	37‍–‍41
San Francisco Giants	83	71	.539	4	42‍–‍35	41‍–‍36
Pittsburgh Pirates	78	76	.506	9	47‍–‍30	31‍–‍46
Chicago Cubs	74	80	.481	13	38‍–‍39	36‍–‍41
Cincinnati Reds	74	80	.481	13	43‍–‍34	31‍–‍46
St. Louis Cardinals	71	83	.461	16	42‍–‍35	29‍–‍48
Philadelphia Phillies	64	90	.416	23	37‍–‍40	27‍–‍50

=== Record vs. opponents ===
1959 National League record Sources:
Team	CHC	CIN	LAD	MIL	PHI	PIT	SF	STL
Chicago	—	9–13	11–11	10–12	10–12–1	12–10	12–10	10–12
Cincinnati	13–9	—	13–9	11–11	9–13	9–13	8–14	11–11
Los Angeles	11–11	9–13	—	14–10	17–5	11–11	14–8	12–10
Milwaukee	12–10	11–11	10–14	—	13–9	15–7–1	12–10	13–9
Philadelphia	12–10–1	13–9	5–17	9–13	—	9–13	9–13	7–15
Pittsburgh	10–12	13–9	11–11	7–15–1	13–9	—	10–12	14–8
San Francisco	10–12	14–8	8–14	10–12	13–9	12–10	—	16–6
St. Louis	12–10	11–11	10–12	9–13	15–7	8–14	6–16	—

=== Game log ===
1959 Game Log: 78–76 (Home: 47–30; Away: 31–46)
April: 6–8 (Home: 2–4; Away: 4–4)

#	Date	Opponent	Score	Win	Loss	Save	Attendance	Record
1	April 9	@ Reds	1–4	Purkey	**Kline** (0–1)	—	32,190	0–1
2	April 10	Braves	0–8	Spahn	**Friend** (0–1)	—	33,317	0–2
3	April 11	Braves	3–4	Burdette	**Law** (0–1)	—	11,800	0–3
4	April 14	@ Reds	2–3	Purkey	**Witt** (0–1)	—	7,631	0–4
5	April 15	@ Reds	5–10	Nuxhall	**Friend** (0–2)	Mabe	3,228	0–5
6	April 17	@ Braves	2–2			—	8,562	0–5
7	April 18	@ Braves	11–5	**Law** (1–1)	Buhl	—	15,703	1–5
8	April 22	Reds	9–8	**Face** (1–0)	Pena	—	16,038	2–5
9	April 23	Reds	2–5	Lawrence	**Witt** (0–2)	—	18,819	2–6
10	April 24	@ Phillies	8–5	**Face** (2–0)	Schroll	—	15,675	3–6
11	April 25	@ Phillies	4–2	**Haddix** (1–0)	Morehead	—	6,678	4–6
12	April 26	@ Phillies	9–2	**Law** (2–1)	Cardwell	—		5–6
13	April 26	@ Phillies	5–10	Meyer	**Friend** (0–3)	—	19,266	5–7
14	April 27	Dodgers	3–9	Drysdale	**Witt** (0–3)	—	10,689	5–8
15	April 29	Giants	3–2	**Kline** (1–1)	Antonelli	—	19,799	6–8

May: 19–14 (Home: 10–6; Away: 9–8)

#	Date	Opponent	Score	Win	Loss	Save	Attendance	Record
16	May 1	Cardinals	6–7	Mizell	**Friend** (0–4)	Brosnan	18,950	6–9
17	May 2	Cardinals	2–1	**Haddix** (2–0)	McDaniel	—	10,758	7–9
18	May 3	Cardinals	4–3 (10)	**Face** (3–0)	Brosnan	—		8–9
19	May 3	Cardinals	1–3	Blaylock	**Daniels** (0–1)	McDaniel	26,080	8–10
20	May 4	Cubs	2–1	**Kline** (2–1)	Anderson	**Face** (1)	14,421	9–10
21	May 5	Cubs	3–6	Hobbie	**Friend** (0–5)	—	17,429	9–11
22	May 6	Cubs	0–3	Hillman	**Haddix** (2–1)	—	5,860	9–12
23	May 7	Phillies	5–4 (10)	**Face** (4–0)	Owens	—	10,358	10–12
24	May 8	Phillies	1–8	Conley	**Witt** (0–4)	Farrell	17,691	10–13
25	May 9	Phillies	9–1	**Kline** (3–1)	Gomez	—	9,633	11–13
26	May 10	Phillies	3–6	Roberts	**Friend** (0–6)	Farrell		11–14
27	May 10	Phillies	7–6	**Haddix** (3–1)	Hearn	**Face** (2)	23,549	12–14
28	May 11	@ Giants	4–14	Sanford	**Daniels** (0–2)	—	13,789	12–15
29	May 12	@ Giants	6–5 (12)	**Daniels** (1–2)	Jones	—	8,084	13–15
30	May 13	@ Dodgers	6–4	**Face** (5–0)	Drysdale	—	16,718	14–15
31	May 14	@ Dodgers	7–6	**Face** (6–0)	Labine	—	15,416	15–15
32	May 16	@ Cubs	2–3	Elston	**Haddix** (3–2)	—	10,496	15–16
33	May 17	@ Cubs	5–4	**Law** (3–1)	Anderson	**Face** (3)		16–16
34	May 17	@ Cubs	6–7	Hobbie	**Daniels** (1–3)	Henry	32,017	16–17
35	May 19	@ Cardinals	2–8	Jackson	**Kline** (3–2)	—	8,470	16–18
36	May 20	@ Cardinals	1–11	Mizell	**Friend** (0–7)	—	8,555	16–19
37	May 21	@ Cardinals	7–2	**Haddix** (4–2)	McDaniel	—	8,141	17–19
38	May 22	Reds	4–3	**Law** (4–1)	Jeffcoat	—	27,675	18–19
39	May 23	Reds	6–5	**Daniels** (2–3)	Pena	**Blackburn** (1)	13,119	19–19
40	May 24	Reds	2–1	**Kline** (4–2)	Lawrence	—		20–19
41	May 24	Reds	5–4 (10)	**Blackburn** (1–0)	Purkey	—	32,273	21–19
42	May 26	@ Braves	0–1 (13)	Burdette	**Haddix** (4–3)	—	19,194	21–20
43	May 27	@ Braves	3–4	Spahn	**Law** (4–2)	McMahon	17,721	21–21
44	May 28	@ Braves	3–0	**Friend** (1–7)	Jay	—	12,635	22–21
45	May 29	@ Reds	5–8	Mabe	**Kline** (4–3)	Acker	18,958	22–22
46	May 30	@ Reds	3–1	**Daniels** (3–3)	O'Toole	**Face** (4)	8,613	23–22
47	May 31	@ Reds	6–2	**Law** (5–2)	Purkey	—		24–22
48	May 31	@ Reds	14–11	**Face** (7–0)	Mabe	—	17,847	25–22

June: 15–15 (Home: 8–7; Away: 7–8)

#	Date	Opponent	Score	Win	Loss	Save	Attendance	Record
49	June 2	Cardinals	3–0	**Haddix** (5–3)	Jackson	—	28,644	26–22
50	June 3	Cardinals	5–3	**Friend** (2–7)	Mizell	**Face** (5)	16,857	27–22
51	June 4	Cardinals	9–3	**Kline** (5–3)	Broglio	—	7,555	28–22
52	June 5	Cubs	5–10	Hobbie	**Law** (5–3)	Elston	27,335	28–23
53	June 6	Cubs	2–8	Drabowsky	**Daniels** (3–4)	—	12,953	28–24
54	June 7	Cubs	2–4	Buzhardt	**Haddix** (5–4)	Henry		28–25
55	June 7	Cubs	0–1	Singleton	**Friend** (2–8)	Elston	32,078	28–26
56	June 8	Giants	12–9 (11)	**Face** (8–0)	McCormick	—	19,080	29–26
57	June 9	Giants	2–6	Antonelli	**Law** (5–4)	—	24,272	29–27
58	June 10	Giants	7–11	Jones	**Witt** (0–5)	Miller	24,317	29–28
59	June 11	Giants	12–9	**Face** (9–0)	Miller	**Law** (1)	9,444	30–28
60	June 12	Dodgers	6–9	McDevitt	**Daniels** (3–5)	Erskine	27,970	30–29
61	June 13	Dodgers	5–3	**Kline** (6–3)	Fowler	—	11,944	31–29
62	June 14	Dodgers	6–3	**Face** (10–0)	Labine	—		32–29
63	June 14	Dodgers	5–2	**Law** (6–4)	Erskine	—	30,082	33–29
64	June 16	@ Cubs	5–2	**Friend** (3–8)	Hillman	**Face** (6)	10,391	34–29
65	June 17	@ Cubs	2–5	Henry	**Haddix** (5–5)	—	10,230	34–30
66	June 18	@ Cubs	4–2 (13)	**Face** (11–0)	Henry	—	7,562	35–30
67	June 19	@ Cardinals	6–0	**Law** (7–4)	Ricketts	—	17,461	36–30
68	June 20	@ Cardinals	2–5	Mizell	**Friend** (3–9)	McDaniel	10,698	36–31
69	June 21	@ Cardinals	1–5	Jackson	**Haddix** (5–6)	McDaniel		36–32
70	June 21	@ Cardinals	10–8	**Daniels** (4–5)	Blaylock	**Face** (7)	23,731	37–32
71	June 22	@ Giants	1–4	Fisher	**Kline** (6–4)	Worthington	11,002	37–33
72	June 23	@ Giants	5–1	**Law** (8–4)	Jones	—	22,706	38–33
73	June 24	@ Giants	3–4	McCormick	**Daniels** (4–6)	—	12,643	38–34
74	June 25	@ Giants	3–1 (12)	**Face** (12–0)	Fisher	—	11,487	39–34
75	June 26	@ Dodgers	5–6	Podres	**Kline** (6–5)	McDevitt	22,719	39–35
76	June 27	@ Dodgers	0–3	Koufax	**Law** (8–5)	—	31,649	39–36
77	June 28	@ Dodgers	4–9	McDevitt	**Friend** (3–10)	Drysdale	27,785	39–37
78	June 30	@ Phillies	4–3	**Haddix** (6–6)	Roberts	**Face** (8)	11,149	40–37

July: 10–17 (Home: 9–8; Away: 1–9)

#	Date	Opponent	Score	Win	Loss	Save	Attendance	Record
79	July 1	@ Phillies	0–1	Conley	**Kline** (6–6)	—	7,897	40–38
80	July 2	Braves	4–3 (10)	**Law** (9–5)	McMahon	—	28,282	41–38
81	July 3	Braves	0–6	Pizarro	**Witt** (0–6)	—	34,093	41–39
82	July 4	Reds	4–3	**Friend** (4–10)	Nuxhall	—	16,548	42–39
83	July 5	Reds	7–5	**Haddix** (7–6)	Lawrence	**Face** (9)		43–39
84	July 5	Reds	3–2 (11)	**Kline** (7–6)	Pena	—	22,622	44–39
85	July 9	Cubs	4–3 (10)	**Face** (13–0)	Henry	—	22,080	45–39
86	July 10	Cubs	7–6 (11)	**Daniels** (5–6)	Elston	—	25,360	46–39
87	July 11	Cubs	1–5	Hillman	**Kline** (7–7)	—	15,110	46–40
88	July 12	Cardinals	6–5 (10)	**Face** (14–0)	McDaniel	—		47–40
89	July 12	Cardinals	6–8 (10)	McDaniel	**Porterfield** (0–1)	—	25,530	47–41
90	July 14	Dodgers	9–1	**Law** (10–5)	Podres	—	30,199	48–41
91	July 15	Dodgers	0–3	Drysdale	**Friend** (4–11)	—	28,268	48–42
92	July 17	Giants	1–4	Jones	**Kline** (7–8)	—	33,220	48–43
93	July 18	Giants	3–4	Fisher	**Haddix** (7–7)	McCormick	20,577	48–44
94	July 19	Giants	3–2	**Law** (11–5)	Miller	—	27,992	49–44
95	July 21	Phillies	2–4	Roberts	**Friend** (4–12)	—	25,960	49–45
96	July 22	Phillies	4–11	Conley	**Kline** (7–9)	—	17,024	49–46
97	July 24	@ Braves	0–8	Pizarro	**Haddix** (7–8)	—	27,708	49–47
98	July 25	@ Braves	0–3	Burdette	**Law** (11–6)	—	25,295	49–48
99	July 26	@ Braves	0–4	Spahn	**Friend** (4–13)	—		49–49
100	July 26	@ Braves	1–2	Buhl	**Witt** (0–7)	McMahon	39,420	49–50
101	July 27	@ Braves	2–5	Jay	**Kline** (7–10)	—	15,817	49–51
102	July 28	@ Dodgers	4–9	Williams	**Blackburn** (1–1)	—	23,493	49–52
103	July 29	@ Dodgers	0–2	Craig	**Law** (11–7)	—	24,324	49–53
104	July 30	@ Dodgers	5–4 (12)	**Daniels** (6–6)	Williams	**Gross** (1)	24,221	50–53
105	July 31	@ Giants	3–4	Sanford	**Haddix** (7–9)	—	22,371	50–54

August: 20–8 (Home: 15–3; Away: 5–5)

#	Date	Opponent	Score	Win	Loss	Save	Attendance	Record
106	August 1	@ Giants	5–9	Byerly	**Daniels** (6–7)	Miller	21,567	50–55
107	August 2	@ Giants	3–5	Antonelli	**Porterfield** (0–2)	—	22,653	50–56
108	August 4	@ Cardinals	7–3	**Law** (12–7)	Gibson	—	10,971	51–56
109	August 5	@ Cardinals	0–3	Broglio	**Friend** (4–14)	—	8,079	51–57
110	August 6	@ Cardinals	18–2	**Haddix** (8–9)	Jackson	—	8,503	52–57
111	August 7	@ Cubs	0–4	Drabowsky	**Kline** (7–11)	—	7,434	52–58
112	August 8	@ Cubs	4–3 (14)	**Gross** (1–0)	Donnelly	—	5,693	53–58
113	August 9	@ Cubs	5–3 (10)	**Face** (15–0)	Elston	—	19,138	54–58
114	August 11	@ Phillies	4–6	Cardwell	**Friend** (4–15)	Farrell	12,127	54–59
115	August 12	@ Phillies	6–2	**Haddix** (9–9)	Roberts	—	11,163	55–59
116	August 14	Braves	2–1	**Law** (13–7)	Jay	—	26,873	56–59
117	August 15	Braves	10–8	**Kline** (8–11)	Burdette	**Green** (1)	34,478	57–59
118	August 16	Braves	2–1	**Friend** (5–15)	Pizarro	**Porterfield** (1)		58–59
119	August 16	Braves	2–5	Spahn	**Daniels** (6–8)	—	24,518	58–60
120	August 17	Cubs	7–6	**Green** (1–0)	Henry	—	12,815	59–60
121	August 19	Cardinals	4–2	**Law** (14–7)	Gibson	—	19,075	60–60
122	August 20	Cardinals	3–1	**Friend** (6–15)	Broglio	—	8,059	61–60
123	August 21	Dodgers	5–6	Podres	**Kline** (8–12)	Koufax	24,678	61–61
124	August 22	Dodgers	2–0	**Daniels** (7–8)	Craig	**Gross** (2)	10,260	62–61
125	August 23	Dodgers	9–2	**Haddix** (10–9)	Drysdale	—		63–61
126	August 23	Dodgers	4–3 (10)	**Face** (16–0)	Drysdale	—	25,173	64–61
127	August 24	Giants	6–0	**Friend** (7–15)	Jones	—	23,617	65–61
128	August 25	Giants	5–12	Antonelli	**Kline** (8–13)	—	29,927	65–62
129	August 26	Giants	5–4 (10)	**Kline** (9–13)	Miller	—	20,244	66–62
130	August 28	Phillies	9–0	**Law** (15–7)	Keegan	—	20,926	67–62
131	August 29	Phillies	11–1	**Friend** (8–15)	Roberts	—	9,714	68–62
132	August 30	Phillies	2–1	**Haddix** (11–9)	Robinson	—		69–62
133	August 30	Phillies	7–6 (10)	**Face** (17–0)	Farrell	—	20,015	70–62

September: 8–14 (Home: 3–2; Away: 5–12)

#	Date	Opponent	Score	Win	Loss	Save	Attendance	Record
134	September 2	@ Reds	3–6	O'Toole	**Law** (15–8)	—		70–63
135	September 2	@ Reds	1–2	Newcombe	**Friend** (8–16)	—	13,014	70–64
136	September 4	@ Phillies	0–3	Owens	**Haddix** (11–10)	—	13,136	70–65
137	September 5	@ Phillies	7–6	**Porterfield** (1–2)	Farrell	**Daniels** (1)	5,993	71–65
138	September 6	@ Phillies	1–2	Roberts	**Law** (15–9)	—	9,684	71–66
139	September 7	@ Braves	1–5	Burdette	**Friend** (8–17)	—		71–67
140	September 7	@ Braves	1–4	Buhl	**Daniels** (7–9)	—	26,910	71–68
141	September 9	@ Giants	2–7	Sanford	**Haddix** (11–11)	Miller	22,768	71–69
142	September 10	@ Giants	5–3	**Law** (16–9)	Antonelli	—	14,130	72–69
143	September 11	@ Dodgers	4–5	Churn	**Face** (17–1)	—		72–70
144	September 11	@ Dodgers	0–4	Sherry	**Green** (1–1)	—	48,526	72–71
145	September 13	@ Dodgers	4–3	**Kline** (10–13)	Churn	—	20,176	73–71
146	September 16	@ Cubs	3–2	**Law** (17–9)	Anderson	—		74–71
147	September 16	@ Cubs	2–4	Elston	**Friend** (8–18)	—	1,366	74–72
148	September 17	@ Cardinals	7–0	**Haddix** (12–11)	Jackson	—	4,970	75–72
149	September 19	Reds	4–3 (12)	**Face** (18–1)	Lawrence	—	8,406	76–72
150	September 20	Reds	10–1	**Law** (18–9)	Brosnan	—	21,068	77–72
151	September 21	Braves	6–8	Spahn	**Friend** (8–19)	McMahon	17,205	77–73
152	September 22	Braves	3–5	Pizarro	**Haddix** (12–12)	McMahon	17,658	77–74
153	September 23	Braves	5–4	**Kline** (11–13)	Jay	**Face** (10)	20,502	78–74
154	September 26	@ Reds	6–7	Purkey	**Gross** (1–1)	—	4,703	78–75
155	September 27	@ Reds	7–9	Nuxhall	**Green** (1–2)	Purkey	15,522	78–76

Legend: = Win = Loss = Tie
Bold = Pirates team member

=== Notable transactions ===
- May 29, 1959: Gene Baker was released by the Pirates.
- June 13, 1959: Bob Smith was selected off waivers from the Pirates by the Detroit Tigers.

=== Roster ===
1959 Pittsburgh Pirates
**Roster**
**Pitchers**: 36 Ron Blackburn; 39 Bennie Daniels; 26 Roy Face; 19 Bob Friend; 34 Paul Giel; 35 Fred Green; 37 Don Gross; 31 Harvey Haddix; 38 Dick Hall; 38 Al Jackson; 22 Ron Kline; 32 Vern Law; 16 Bob Porterfield; 37 Bob Smith; 34 Jim Umbricht; 35 Don Williams; 30 George Witt	**Catchers**: 6 Smoky Burgess; 20 Hank Foiles; 10 Danny Kravitz; 20 Hardy Peterson; **Infielders**: 24 Dick Groat; 48 Ken Hamlin; 12 Don Hoak; 3 Ted Kluszewski; 9 Bill Mazeroski; 14 Rocky Nelson; 11 Dick Schofield; 28 R. C. Stevens; 7 Dick Stuart	**Outfielders**: 8 Harry Bright; 23 Joe Christopher; 21 Roberto Clemente; 15 Román Mejías; 2 Harry Simpson; 4 Bob Skinner; 18 Bill Virdon	**Manager**: 40 Danny Murtaugh; **Coaches**: 41 Bill Burwell (Pitching); 42 George Detore (First Base, 5/3 - 9/27); 42 Jimmy Dykes (First Base, 4/9 - 5/2); 45 Lenny Levy (Hitting); 43 Sam Narron (Bullpen); 44 Frank Oceak (Third Base)

== Player stats ==
=== Batting ===
==== Starters by position ====
Note: Pos = Position; G = Games played; AB = At bats; H = Hits; Avg. = Batting average; HR = Home runs; RBI = Runs batted in

Pos	Player	G	AB	H	Avg.	HR	RBI
C	Smoky Burgess	114	377	112	.297	11	59
1B	Dick Stuart	118	397	118	.297	27	78
2B	Bill Mazeroski	135	493	119	.241	7	59
SS	Dick Groat	147	593	163	.275	5	51
3B	Don Hoak	155	564	166	.294	8	65
LF	Bob Skinner	143	547	153	.280	13	61
CF	Bill Virdon	144	519	132	.254	8	41
RF	Roberto Clemente	105	432	128	.296	4	50

==== Other batters ====
Note: G = Games played; AB = At bats; H = Hits; Avg. = Batting average; HR = Home runs; RBI = Runs batted in

Player	G	AB	H	Avg.	HR	RBI
Román Mejías	96	276	65	.236	7	28
Rocky Nelson	98	175	51	.291	6	32
Danny Kravitz	52	162	41	.253	3	21
Dick Schofield	81	145	31	.234	1	9
Ted Kluszewski	60	122	32	.262	2	17
Hank Foiles	53	80	18	.225	3	4
Harry Bright	40	48	12	.250	3	8
Harry Simpson	9	15	4	.267	0	2
Joe Christopher	15	12	0	.000	0	0
Ken Hamlin	3	8	1	.125	0	2
R.C. Stevens	3	7	2	.286	1	1
Hardy Peterson	2	1	0	.000	0	0

=== Pitching ===
==== Starting pitchers ====
Note: G = Games pitched; IP = Innings pitched; W = Wins; L = Losses; ERA = Earned run average; SO = Strikeouts

Player	G	IP	W	L	ERA	SO
Vern Law	34	266.0	18	9	2.98	110
Bob Friend	35	234.2	8	19	4.03	104
Harvey Haddix	31	224.1	12	12	3.13	149
Ron Kline	33	186.0	11	13	4.26	91
George Witt	15	50.2	0	7	6.93	30
Jim Umbricht	1	7.0	0	0	6.43	3

==== Other pitchers ====
Note: G = Games pitched; IP = Innings pitched; W = Wins; L = Losses; ERA = Earned run average; SO = Strikeouts

Player	G	IP	W	L	ERA	SO
Bennie Daniels	34	100.2	7	9	5.45	67
Al Jackson	8	18.0	0	0	6.50	13
Dick Hall	2	8.2	0	0	3.12	3

==== Relief pitchers ====
Note: G = Games pitched; W = Wins; L = Losses; SV = Saves; ERA = Earned run average; SO = Strikeouts

Player	G	W	L	SV	ERA	SO
Roy Face	57	18	1	10	2.70	69
Bob Porterfield	36	1	2	1	4.35	19
Ron Blackburn	26	1	1	1	3.65	19
Don Gross	21	1	1	2	3.55	15
Bob Smith	20	0	0	0	3.49	12
Fred Green	17	1	2	1	3.13	20
Don Williams	6	0	0	0	6.75	3
Paul Giel	4	0	0	0	14.09	3

== Awards and honors ==
=== Records ===
- Roy Face, major league record, most wins in one season by a relief pitcher (18)
- Harvey Haddix, major league record, Most consecutive batters retired in one game (36)

== Farm system ==
Level	Team	League	Manager
AAA	Columbus Jets	International League	Cal Ermer
AAA	Salt Lake City Bees	Pacific Coast League	Larry Shepard
A	Columbus/Gastonia Pirates	Sally League	Ray Hathaway
B	Wilson Tobs	Carolina League	Harding "Pete" Peterson and Don Osborn
C	Grand Forks Chiefs	Northern League	James Adlam
C	Idaho Falls Russets	Pioneer League	Bob Clear
D	Salem Rebels	Appalachian League	Lamar Dorton
D	Dubuque Packers	Midwest League	Wally Millies, John Armstrong, Syd Thrift and Al Kubski
D	San Angelo/Roswell Pirates	Sophomore League	Al Kubski, Joe Bauman and Wally Millies

LEAGUE CHAMPIONS: Salt Lake City, Gastonia, Wilson
Columbus (GA) franchise transferred to Gastonia, May 26, 1959; San Angelo franchise transferred to Roswell, June 9, 1959
