= 1959 Los Angeles Dodgers season =

Major League Baseball season

1959 Los Angeles Dodgers
- World Series champions National League champions
- League: National League
- Ballpark: Los Angeles Memorial Coliseum
- City: Los Angeles
- Record: 86–68 (.558)
- Divisional place: 1st
- Owners: Walter O'Malley, James & Dearie Mulvey
- President: Walter O'Malley
- General managers: Buzzie Bavasi
- Managers: Walter Alston
- Television: KTTV (11)
- Radio: KMPC; Vin Scully, Jerry Doggett; KWKW; René Cárdenas, Jaime Jarrín, Miguel Alonzo

The 1959 Los Angeles Dodgers season was the 70th season for the Los Angeles Dodgers franchise in Major League Baseball (MLB), their 2nd season in Los Angeles, California, and their 2nd season playing their home games at Los Angeles Memorial Coliseum in Los Angeles California. The Dodgers finished in a first-place tie with the Milwaukee Braves, with each team going 86–68. The Dodgers won the pennant as they swept the Braves in a best-of-three tie-breaker series. They went on to defeat the Chicago White Sox in the World Series in just their second season since leaving Brooklyn. The Dodgers led all 16 Major League Baseball clubs in home attendance, drawing 2,071,045 fans to Los Angeles Memorial Coliseum.

== Offseason ==
- December 4, 1958: Gino Cimoli was traded by the Dodgers to the St. Louis Cardinals for Wally Moon and Phil Paine.
- December 23, 1958: Sparky Anderson was traded by the Dodgers to the Philadelphia Phillies for Rip Repulski, Jim Golden and Gene Snyder.

While training in Vero Beach, the Dodgers played their home spring training games at Payne Park in Sarasota, Florida in 1959.

== Regular season ==
=== Season standings ===
National League
Team	W	L	Pct.	GB	Home	Road
Los Angeles Dodgers	88	68	.564	—	46‍–‍32	42‍–‍36
Milwaukee Braves	86	70	.551	2	49‍–‍29	37‍–‍41
San Francisco Giants	83	71	.539	4	42‍–‍35	41‍–‍36
Pittsburgh Pirates	78	76	.506	9	47‍–‍30	31‍–‍46
Chicago Cubs	74	80	.481	13	38‍–‍39	36‍–‍41
Cincinnati Reds	74	80	.481	13	43‍–‍34	31‍–‍46
St. Louis Cardinals	71	83	.461	16	42‍–‍35	29‍–‍48
Philadelphia Phillies	64	90	.416	23	37‍–‍40	27‍–‍50

=== Record vs. opponents ===
1959 National League record Sources:
Team	CHC	CIN	LAD	MIL	PHI	PIT	SF	STL
Chicago	—	9–13	11–11	10–12	10–12–1	12–10	12–10	10–12
Cincinnati	13–9	—	13–9	11–11	9–13	9–13	8–14	11–11
Los Angeles	11–11	9–13	—	14–10	17–5	11–11	14–8	12–10
Milwaukee	12–10	11–11	10–14	—	13–9	15–7–1	12–10	13–9
Philadelphia	12–10–1	13–9	5–17	9–13	—	9–13	9–13	7–15
Pittsburgh	10–12	13–9	11–11	7–15–1	13–9	—	10–12	14–8
San Francisco	10–12	14–8	8–14	10–12	13–9	12–10	—	16–6
St. Louis	12–10	11–11	10–12	9–13	15–7	8–14	6–16	—

=== Opening Day lineup ===
Opening Day starters
Name	Position
Ron Fairly	Right fielder
Wally Moon	Left fielder
John Roseboro	Catcher
Duke Snider	Center fielder
Charlie Neal	Second baseman
Gil Hodges	First baseman
Don Zimmer	Shortstop
Jim Baxes	Third baseman
Don Drysdale	Starting pitcher

=== Notable transactions ===
- June 15, 1959: Dick Gray was traded by the Dodgers to the St. Louis Cardinals for Chuck Essegian and Lloyd Merritt.

=== Roster ===
1959 Los Angeles Dodgers
Roster
Pitchers: 45 Chuck Churn; 38 Roger Craig; 53 Don Drysdale; 17 Carl Erskine; 45 Art Fowler; 21 Bill Harris; 26 Fred Kipp; 35 Johnny Klippstein; 32 Sandy Koufax; 41 Clem Labine; 16 Danny McDevitt; 22 Johnny Podres; 51 Larry Sherry; 37 Gene Snyder; 40 Stan Williams	Catchers: 58 Joe Pignatano; 44 John Roseboro; 34 Norm Sherry; Infielders: 29 Jim Baxes; 19 Jim Gilliam; 11 Dick Gray; 14 Gil Hodges; 5 Norm Larker; 30 Bob Lillis; 43 Charlie Neal; 30 Maury Wills; 23 Don Zimmer	Outfielders: 18 Sandy Amorós; 12 Tommy Davis; 2 Don Demeter; 18 Solly Drake; 29 Chuck Essegian; 8 Ron Fairly; 6 Carl Furillo; 25 Frank Howard; 9 Wally Moon; 20 Rip Repulski; 4 Duke Snider	Manager: 24 Walter Alston; Coaches: 33 Joe Becker; 7 Charlie Dressen; 31 Greg Mulleavy; 1 Pee Wee Reese

== Player stats ==
= Indicates team leader

= Indicates league leader

=== Batting ===
==== Starters by position ====
Note: Pos = Position; G = Games played; AB = At bats; H = Hits; Avg. = Batting average; HR = Home runs; RBI = Runs batted in

Pos	Player	G	AB	H	Avg.	HR	RBI
C	John Roseboro	118	397	92	.232	10	38
1B	Gil Hodges	124	413	114	.276	25	80
2B	Charlie Neal	151	616	177	.287	19	83
SS	Don Zimmer	97	249	41	.165	4	28
3B	Jim Gilliam	145	553	156	.282	3	34
LF	Wally Moon	145	543	164	.302	19	74
CF	Don Demeter	139	371	95	.256	18	70
RF	Duke Snider	126	370	114	.308	23	88

==== Other batters ====
Note: G = Games played; AB = At bats; H = Hits; Avg. = Batting average; HR = Home runs; RBI = Runs batted in

Player	G	AB	H	Avg.	HR	RBI
Norm Larker	108	311	90	.289	8	49
Ron Fairly	118	244	58	.238	4	23
Maury Wills	83	242	63	.260	0	7
Joe Pignatano	52	139	33	.237	1	11
Rip Repulski	53	94	24	.255	2	14
Carl Furillo	50	93	27	.290	0	13
Dick Gray	21	52	8	.154	2	4
Bob Lillis	30	48	11	.229	0	2
Chuck Essegian	24	46	14	.304	1	5
Jim Baxes	11	33	10	.303	2	5
Frank Howard	9	21	3	.143	1	6
Solly Drake	9	8	2	.250	0	0
Sandy Amoros	5	5	1	.200	0	1
Norm Sherry	2	3	1	.333	0	2
Tommy Davis	1	1	0	.000	0	0

=== Pitching ===
==== Starting pitchers ====
Note: G = Games pitched; IP = Innings pitched; W = Wins; L = Losses; ERA = Earned run average; SO = Strikeouts

Player	G	IP	W	L	ERA	SO
Don Drysdale	44	270.2	17	13	3.46	242
Johnny Podres	34	195.0	14	9	4.11	145
Sandy Koufax	35	153.1	8	6	4.05	173
Roger Craig	29	152.2	11	5	2.06	76

==== Other pitchers ====
Note: G = Games pitched; IP = Innings pitched; W = Wins; L = Losses; ERA = Earned run average; SO = Strikeouts

Player	G	IP	W	L	ERA	SO
Danny McDevitt	39	145.0	10	8	3.97	106
Stan Williams	35	124.2	5	5	3.97	89
Larry Sherry	23	94.1	7	2	2.19	72
Gene Snyder	11	26.1	1	1	5.47	20
Carl Erskine	10	23.1	0	3	7.71	15

==== Relief pitchers ====
Note: G = Games pitched; W = Wins; L = Losses; SV = Saves; ERA = Earned run average; SO = Strikeouts

Player	G	W	L	SV	ERA	SO
Clem Labine	56	5	10	8	3.93	37
Art Fowler	36	3	4	2	5.31	47
Johnny Klippstein	28	4	0	2	5.91	30
Chuck Churn	14	3	2	1	4.99	24
Fred Kipp	2	0	0	0	0.00	1
Bill Harris	1	0	0	0	0.00	0

== 1959 World Series ==
=== Game 1 ===
October 1, 1959, at Comiskey Park I in Chicago

Team	1	2	3	4	5	6	7	8	9	R	H	E
Los Angeles (N)	0	0	0	0	0	0	0	0	0	0	8	3
Chicago (A)	2	0	7	2	0	0	0	0	x	11	11	0
W: Early Wynn (1–0) L: Roger Craig (0–1) S: Gerry Staley (1)
HR: CWS – Ted Kluszewski (1, 2)

=== Game 2 ===
October 2, 1959, at Comiskey Park I in Chicago

Team	1	2	3	4	5	6	7	8	9	R	H	E
Los Angeles (N)	0	0	0	0	1	0	3	0	0	4	9	1
Chicago (A)	2	0	0	0	0	0	0	1	0	3	8	0
W: Johnny Podres (1–0) L: Bob Shaw (0–1) S: Larry Sherry (1)
HR: LAD – Charlie Neal (1, 2), Chuck Essegian (1)

=== Game 3 ===
October 4, 1959, at Los Angeles Memorial Coliseum in Los Angeles

Team	1	2	3	4	5	6	7	8	9	R	H	E
Chicago (A)	0	0	0	0	0	0	0	1	0	1	12	0
Los Angeles (N)	0	0	0	0	0	0	2	1	x	3	5	0
W: Don Drysdale (1–0) L: Dick Donovan (0–1) S: Larry Sherry (1)

=== Game 4 ===
October 5, 1959, at Los Angeles Memorial Coliseum in Los Angeles

Team	1	2	3	4	5	6	7	8	9	R	H	E
Chicago (A)	0	0	0	0	0	0	4	0	0	4	10	3
Los Angeles (N)	0	0	4	0	0	0	0	1	x	5	9	0
W: Larry Sherry (1–0) L: Gerry Staley (0–1)
HR: CWS – Sherm Lollar (1) LAD – Gil Hodges (1)

=== Game 5 ===
October 6, 1959, at Los Angeles Memorial Coliseum in Los Angeles

Team	1	2	3	4	5	6	7	8	9	R	H	E
Chicago (A)	0	0	0	1	0	0	0	0	0	1	5	0
Los Angeles (N)	0	0	0	0	0	0	0	0	0	0	9	0
W: Bob Shaw (1–1) L: Sandy Koufax (0–1) S: Dick Donovan (1)

=== Game 6 ===
October 8, 1959, at Comiskey Park I in Chicago

Team	1	2	3	4	5	6	7	8	9	R	H	E
Los Angeles (N)	0	0	2	6	0	0	0	0	1	9	13	0
Chicago (A)	0	0	0	3	0	0	0	0	0	3	6	1
W: Larry Sherry (2–0) L: Early Wynn (1–1)
HR: LAD – Duke Snider (1), Wally Moon (1), Chuck Essegian (2) CWS – Ted Kluszewski (3)

== Awards and honors ==
- World Series Most Valuable Player
  - Larry Sherry
- Gold Glove Award
  - Charlie Neal
  - Gil Hodges
- TSN Manager of the Year
  - Walter Alston
- TSN Executive of the Year Award
  - Buzzie Bavasi
- NL Player of the Month
  - Don Drysdale (July 1959)

=== All-Stars ===
- 1959 Major League Baseball All-Star Game – Game 1
  - Don Drysdale starter
  - Wally Moon starter
- 1959 Major League Baseball All-Star Game – Game 2
  - Don Drysdale starter
  - Wally Moon starter
  - Jim Gilliam reserve
  - Charlie Neal reserve

== Farm system ==
Level	Team	League	Manager
AAA	Montreal Royals	International League	Clay Bryant
AAA	Spokane Indians	Pacific Coast League	Bobby Bragan
AAA	St. Paul Saints	American Association	Max Macon
AA	Victoria Rosebuds	Texas League	Pete Reiser
A	Macon Dodgers	South Atlantic League	Danny Ozark
B	Green Bay Bluejays	Illinois–Indiana–Iowa League	Stan Wasiak
C	Great Falls Electrics	Pioneer League	Brandy Davis
C	Reno Silver Sox	California League	Ray Perry
D	Kokomo Dodgers	Midwest League	Edward Serrano
D	Odessa Dodgers	Sophomore League	Roy Hartsfield
D	Orlando Dodgers	Florida State League	Martin Devlin
D	Panama City Fliers	Alabama–Florida League	Al Ronning

LEAGUE CHAMPIONS: Green Bay
