= 1959 Cincinnati Reds season =

1959 Cincinnati Reds
- League: National League
- Ballpark: Crosley Field
- City: Cincinnati
- Owners: Powel Crosley Jr.
- General managers: Gabe Paul
- Managers: Mayo Smith, Fred Hutchinson
- Television: WLW (George Bryson, Frank McCormick)
- Radio: WKRC (Waite Hoyt, Jack Moran)

The 1959 Cincinnati Reds season consisted of the Reds finishing in a fifth-place tie with the Chicago Cubs in the National League standings, with a record of 74–80, 13 games behind the NL and World Champion Los Angeles Dodgers.

Prior to the season the club, after calling themselves the Cincinnati Redlegs for the past six seasons, changed its nickname back to the Reds. The Reds played their home games at Crosley Field, where they attracted 801,298 fans, eighth and last in the Senior Circuit.

== Offseason ==
- January 30, 1959: Smoky Burgess, Harvey Haddix and Don Hoak were traded by the Reds to the Pittsburgh Pirates for Whammy Douglas, Jim Pendleton, Frank Thomas, and John Powers.
- March 20, 1959: Eddie Miksis was released by the Reds.

== Regular season ==
For the second consecutive season, the Reds played under two managers. Mayo Smith, hired during the previous off-season, managed the Reds to a 35–45 start, seventh in the eight-team league. He was replaced during the first All-Star break by Fred Hutchinson, manager of their Triple-A Seattle Rainiers affiliate, on July 9. Hutchinson then led Cincinnati to a 39–35 record the rest of the way.

=== Season standings ===
National League
Team	W	L	Pct.	GB	Home	Road
Los Angeles Dodgers	88	68	.564	—	46‍–‍32	42‍–‍36
Milwaukee Braves	86	70	.551	2	49‍–‍29	37‍–‍41
San Francisco Giants	83	71	.539	4	42‍–‍35	41‍–‍36
Pittsburgh Pirates	78	76	.506	9	47‍–‍30	31‍–‍46
Chicago Cubs	74	80	.481	13	38‍–‍39	36‍–‍41
Cincinnati Reds	74	80	.481	13	43‍–‍34	31‍–‍46
St. Louis Cardinals	71	83	.461	16	42‍–‍35	29‍–‍48
Philadelphia Phillies	64	90	.416	23	37‍–‍40	27‍–‍50

=== Record vs. opponents ===
1959 National League record Sources:
Team	CHC	CIN	LAD	MIL	PHI	PIT	SF	STL
Chicago	—	9–13	11–11	10–12	10–12–1	12–10	12–10	10–12
Cincinnati	13–9	—	13–9	11–11	9–13	9–13	8–14	11–11
Los Angeles	11–11	9–13	—	14–10	17–5	11–11	14–8	12–10
Milwaukee	12–10	11–11	10–14	—	13–9	15–7–1	12–10	13–9
Philadelphia	12–10–1	13–9	5–17	9–13	—	9–13	9–13	7–15
Pittsburgh	10–12	13–9	11–11	7–15–1	13–9	—	10–12	14–8
San Francisco	10–12	14–8	8–14	10–12	13–9	12–10	—	16–6
St. Louis	12–10	11–11	10–12	9–13	15–7	8–14	6–16	—

=== Notable transactions ===
- May 1, 1959: Del Ennis was traded by the Reds to the Chicago White Sox for Lou Skizas and Don Rudolph.
- June 8, 1959: Hal Jeffcoat was traded by the Reds to the St. Louis Cardinals for Jim Brosnan.
- June 23, 1959: Walt Dropo was traded by the Reds to the Baltimore Orioles for Whitey Lockman.

=== Roster ===
1959 Cincinnati Reds
Roster
Pitchers: 40 Tom Acker; 47 Luis Arroyo; 41 Jim Bailey; 42 Jim Brosnan; 32 Mike Cuellar; 47 Jay Hook; 42 Hal Jeffcoat; 46 Brooks Lawrence; 35 Bob Mabe; 36 Don Newcombe; 39 Joe Nuxhall; 31 Jim O'Toole; 32 Claude Osteen; 43 Orlando Peña; 37 Bob Purkey; 47 Don Rudolph; 44 Willard Schmidt	Catchers: 6 Ed Bailey; 9 Dutch Dotterer; Infielders: 18 Cliff Cook; 18 Walt Dropo; 17 Bobby Henrich; 14,23 Willie Jones; 10 Eddie Kasko; 19 Whitey Lockman; 11 Roy McMillan; 20 Frank Robinson; 16 Johnny Temple; 15 Frank Thomas	Outfielders: 25 Gus Bell; 23 Del Ennis; 22 Buddy Gilbert; 24 Jerry Lynch; 12 Jim Pendleton; 28 Vada Pinson; 27 John Powers; 29 Pete Whisenant; Other batters: 8 Don Pavletich; 22 Bob Thurman	Manager: 1 Fred Hutchinson; 1 Mayo Smith; Coaches: 2 Cot Deal (Pitching; after 8/4); 2 Clyde King (Pitching; through 8/3); 3 Wally Moses (Hitting & first base); 4 Reggie Otero (Third base)

== Player stats ==
= Indicates team leader

=== Batting ===
==== Starters by position ====
Note: Pos = Position; G = Games played; AB = At bats; H = Hits; Avg. = Batting average; HR = Home runs; RBI = Runs batted in

Pos	Player	G	AB	H	Avg.	HR	RBI
C	Ed Bailey	121	379	100	.264	12	40
1B	Frank Robinson	146	540	168	.311	36	125
2B	Johnny Temple	149	598	186	.311	8	67
SS	Eddie Kasko	118	329	93	.283	2	31
3B	Willie Jones	72	233	58	.249	7	31
LF	Jerry Lynch	117	379	102	.269	17	58
CF	Vada Pinson	154	648	205	.316	20	84
RF	Gus Bell	148	580	170	.293	19	115

==== Other batters ====
Note: G = Games played; AB = At bats; H = Hits; Avg. = Batting average; HR = Home runs; RBI = Runs batted in

Player	G	AB	H	Avg.	HR	RBI
Frank Thomas	108	374	84	.225	12	47
Roy McMillan	79	246	65	.264	9	24
Dutch Dotterer	52	161	43	.267	2	17
Jim Pendleton	65	113	29	.257	3	9
Whitey Lockman	52	84	22	.262	0	7
Pete Whisenant	36	71	17	.239	5	11
John Powers	43	43	11	.256	2	4
Walt Dropo	26	39	4	.103	1	2
Cliff Cook	9	21	8	.381	0	5
Buddy Gilbert	7	20	3	.150	2	2
Del Ennis	5	12	4	.333	0	1
Bob Thurman	4	4	1	.250	0	2
Bobby Henrich	14	3	0	.000	0	0
Don Pavletich	1	0	0	----	0	0

=== Pitching ===
==== Starting pitchers ====
Note: G = Games pitched; IP = Innings pitched; W = Wins; L = Losses; ERA = Earned run average; SO = Strikeouts

Player	G	IP	W	L	ERA	SO
Don Newcombe	30	222.0	13	8	3.16	100
Bob Purkey	38	218.0	13	18	4.25	78
Joe Nuxhall	28	131.2	9	9	4.24	75
Jim O'Toole	28	129.1	5	8	5.15	68
Jay Hook	17	79.0	5	5	5.13	37

==== Other pitchers ====
Note: G = Games pitched; IP = Innings pitched; W = Wins; L = Losses; ERA = Earned run average; SO = Strikeouts

Player	G	IP	W	L	ERA	SO
Orlando Peña	46	136.0	5	9	4.76	76
Brooks Lawrence	43	128.1	7	12	4.77	64
Jim Brosnan	26	83.1	8	3	3.35	56
Jim Bailey	3	11.2	0	1	6.17	7

==== Relief pitchers ====
Note: G = Games pitched; W = Wins; L = Losses; SV = Saves; ERA = Earned run average; SO = Strikeouts

Player	G	W	L	SV	ERA	SO
Tom Acker	37	1	2	2	4.12	45
Willard Schmidt	36	3	2	0	3.95	40
Bob Mabe	18	4	2	3	5.46	8
Hal Jeffcoat	17	0	1	1	3.32	12
Luis Arroyo	10	1	0	0	3.95	8
Don Rudolph	5	0	0	0	4.91	8
Claude Osteen	2	0	0	0	7.04	3
Mike Cuellar	2	0	0	0	15.75	5

== Farm system ==
Level	Team	League	Manager
AAA	Havana Sugar Kings	International League	Preston Gómez
AAA	Seattle Rainiers	Pacific Coast League	Fred Hutchinson and Alan Strange
AA	Nashville Vols	Southern Association	Dick Sisler
A	Savannah Reds	Sally League	Bob Wellman and Jack Cassini
B	Topeka Hawks	Illinois–Indiana–Iowa League	Johnny Vander Meer
C	Visalia Redlegs	California League	Dave Bristol
D	Palatka Redlegs	Florida State League	Clem Koshorek and Tony Pacheco
D	Geneva Redlegs	New York–Penn League	Reno DeBenedetti

LEAGUE CHAMPIONS: Havana
