= Dick Carter =

American baseball player

- Coach
- Born: August 31, 1916; Philadelphia, Pennsylvania, U.S.
- Died: September 11, 1969 (aged 53); Ocean City, New Jersey, U.S.
- Batted: Right Threw: Right
- Stats at Baseball Reference

Teams
- Philadelphia Phillies (1959–1960)

Richard Joseph Carter (August 31, 1916 – September 11, 1969) was an American professional baseball pitcher, outfielder, coach, and manager. Born in Philadelphia, Pennsylvania, he was a graduate of Olney High School. He threw and batted right-handed, stood 5 feet 11 inches (1.80 m) tall and weighed 190 pounds (86 kg).

Carter's minor league playing career occurred during the World War II manpower shortage, and immediately after the war as a playing manager. He spent 1959 and part of 1960 in Major League Baseball as a coach for the Philadelphia Phillies, resigning on May 30, 1960, because of poor health.

Carter managed in the Phils' minor league system from 1947–52 and 1956–58, and also served as a scout for the team. His 1956 Schenectady Blue Jays won the championship of the Class A Eastern League.

He died in Ocean City, New Jersey, at the age of 53.

Preceded by Benny Bengough	Philadelphia Phillies third base coach 1959–1960	Succeeded by Peanuts Lowrey
