= Bob Hartman (baseball) =

American baseball player (1937–2010)

- Pitcher
- Born: August 28, 1937; Kenosha, Wisconsin, U.S.
- Died: June 16, 2010 (aged 72); Kenosha, Wisconsin, U.S.
- Batted: Right Threw: Left

MLB debut
- April 26, 1959, for the Milwaukee Braves

Last MLB appearance
- July 18, 1962, for the Cleveland Indians

MLB statistics
- Win–loss record: 0–1
- Earned run average: 5.21
- Strikeouts: 12
- Innings pitched: 19
- Stats at Baseball Reference

Teams
- Milwaukee Braves (1959); Cleveland Indians (1962)

Robert Louis Hartman (August 28, 1937 – June 16, 2010) was an American professional baseball player. He was a left-handed pitcher who appeared in 11 Major League games over two seasons, pitching in three games for the Milwaukee Braves in 1959 and eight games for the Cleveland Indians in 1962. The native of Kenosha, Wisconsin, stood 5 feet 11 inches (1.80 m) tall and weighed 185 pounds (84 kg).

Hartman signed with his home-state Braves after graduation from Kenosha High School and began his minor league career in 1955. Three years later, he won 20 of 30 decisions for the Double-A Atlanta Crackers, tying for the Southern Association lead in wins and making the league's All-Star team. The following season, with the Triple-A Louisville Colonels, Hartman had another fine season, with a 10–3 win–loss record, and was recalled to the Braves for one game in April and two more in June. He worked in three losing efforts in middle relief and was ineffective in two of them, allowing six hits, five earned runs and two bases on balls in only 12/3 innings pitched.

He returned to the Braves' farm system until June 24, 1962, when he was recalled from Louisville and traded to the Indians for infielder Ken Aspromonte. Two days later, he made his first Major League start against the Detroit Tigers in the second game of a twi-night doubleheader. Hartman lasted ten innings, allowed only three hits and one earned run with seven strikeouts, but left for a pinch hitter with the game tied, 1–1. Relief pitcher Gary Bell worked the next two innings and got credit for a 3–1 Cleveland win.

Later against the Chicago White Sox, Hartman started well with one run allowed in four innings, but in the fifth, he faced four batters and could not record an out, as Chicago scored three earned runs. Hartman made six more appearances as a relief pitcher for Cleveland in July 1962 before returning to the minor leagues, retiring in 1963 after nine professional seasons.

As a Major Leaguer, he allowed 20 hits and ten bases on balls, with 12 strikeouts, in 19 innings pitched.
