= Taylor Phillips =

American baseball player (born 1933)

- Pitcher
- Born: June 18, 1933 (age 93); Atlanta, Georgia, U.S.
- Batted: Left Threw: Left

MLB debut
- June 8, 1956, for the Milwaukee Braves

Last MLB appearance
- September 6, 1963, for the Chicago White Sox

MLB statistics
- Win–loss record: 16–22
- Earned run average: 4.82
- Strikeouts: 233
- Stats at Baseball Reference

Teams
- Milwaukee Braves (1956–1957); Chicago Cubs (1958–1959); Philadelphia Phillies (1959–1960); Chicago White Sox (1963)

Career highlights and awards
- World Series champion (1957)

William Taylor Phillips (born June 18, 1933), nicknamed "T-Bone", is an American former professional baseball left-handed pitcher, who played in Major League Baseball (MLB) for the Milwaukee Braves, Chicago Cubs, Philadelphia Phillies, and Chicago White Sox, from 1956 to 1960 and 1963. During his playing days, Phillips stood 5 feet 11 inches (1.80 m) tall, weighing 185 pounds (84 kg).

== Playing career ==
=== Early years ===
Taylor attended Douglas County High School (Douglasville, Georgia) and earned letters in baseball for three years, graduating in 1950. He attended the University of Georgia on a baseball scholarship for one semester.

=== Milwaukee Braves ===
Phillips entered pro baseball in 1951 and joined the Braves' organization in 1953. After spending 1954–55 in military service, he was recalled from Triple-A Wichita in June 1956, pitched effectively in relief, and then was added to the Milwaukee starting rotation in August. In five starts for the contending Braves, Phillips won three, lost two, and threw three complete games. He then moved back into the bullpen for the stretch drive, which saw the Braves finish just short of the National League (NL) pennant, one game behind the Brooklyn Dodgers. Phillips' rookie season would be his best: he posted his only over-.500 win–loss record (5–3) and his lowest earned run average (ERA) (2.26).

The 1957 Braves would bring home Milwaukee's first NL pennant and World Series triumph, but Phillips slumped badly during the year. In 27 games and 73 innings pitched, he allowed 82 hits, 40 bases on balls, and 45 earned runs; his ERA jumped to 5.55. Phillips did not pitch in the World Series, won by the Braves in seven games over the New York Yankees.

=== Cubs, Phillies, and White Sox ===
Then, in December 1957, Phillips was part of a five-player trade with the Chicago Cubs that netted the Braves starting pitcher Bob Rush. The deal set the stage for Phillips' two busiest seasons in the major leagues. In 1958, he worked in 39 games for the Cubs, with a career-high 27 starts. Phillips threw five complete games, and in his only MLB shutout, Phillips blanked his old Milwaukee teammates, 1–0, on six hits May 25 at County Stadium. But he lost ten of 17 decisions and posted a mediocre 4.76 earned run average. When Phillips got off to a poor start in 1959, with a 7.56 ERA and 0–2 record through seven games, he was traded to the Philadelphia Phillies on May 12, even-up, for another left-hander, Seth Morehead. Pitching largely in relief, Phillips continued to scuffle with the Phils, losing four of five decisions and putting up a 5.00 ERA in 72 innings pitched. As in 1958, he worked in 39 games, but made only five starts, with one complete game, for the two clubs. It would be Phillips‘ last full year in the major leagues.

Sent to the minors at the beginning of 1960, Phillips was recalled from Triple-A to make a June 2 start against the Braves at Connie Mack Stadium, but he lasted only two innings, allowing six hits, four bases on balls, and four earned runs. Phillips was tagged with the 9–8 defeat, in what was his final MLB decision. In ten games and 14 innings through July 8, Phillips struggled to an 8.36 ERA.

Phillips then returned to the minor leagues and would pitch at Triple-A for three years before his final big-league audition, which came in July 1963 for the Chicago White Sox. In his American League (AL) debut on July 23, Phillips surrendered an eighth-inning grand slam home run to Norm Cash of the Detroit Tigers. It was the game-winning blow, although the loss was charged to Phillips’ predecessor on the mound, Eddie Fisher, who had put the winning run on base before Phillips entered the game. In later appearances against the New York Yankees (August 18) and Boston Red Sox (August 22), Phillips was treated roughly, and he finished his White Sox tenure with a 10.29 earned run average in ten games. He spent 1964 at Triple-A before retiring as an active player.

In 147 big league games, 102 in relief, Phillips posted a 16–22 record and 4.82 earned run average, allowing 460 hits and 211 bases on balls in 4382/3 innings pitched. He struck out 233, earned six career saves, and threw nine complete games.
