= Bob Mabe =

American baseball player (1929–2005)

- Pitcher
- Born: October 8, 1929; Danville, Virginia, U.S.
- Died: January 9, 2005 (aged 75); Danville, Virginia, U.S.
- Batted: Right Threw: Right

MLB debut
- April 18, 1958, for the St. Louis Cardinals

Last MLB appearance
- May 5, 1960, for the Baltimore Orioles

MLB statistics
- Win–loss record: 7–11
- Earned run average: 4.82
- Strikeouts: 82
- Stats at Baseball Reference

Teams
- St. Louis Cardinals (1958); Cincinnati Reds (1959); Baltimore Orioles (1960)

Robert Lee Mabe (October 8, 1929 – January 9, 2005) was an American professional baseball player, a right-handed pitcher who appeared in all or parts of three Major League Baseball seasons with the 1958 St. Louis Cardinals, 1959 Cincinnati Reds and the 1960 Baltimore Orioles. He batted right-handed, stood 5 feet 11 inches (1.80 m) tall and weighed 165 pounds (75 kg).

Mabe was a 28-year-old veteran of minor league baseball when he made his MLB debut for the Cardinals in 1958. He had won 37 games for the 1955–1956 Houston Buffaloes of the Class AA Texas League. All told, he won 93 games during a ten-year minor league career.

As a Major Leaguer, Mabe appeared in 51 games played, including 14 as a starting pitcher. He won seven, lost 11 (.389) with 82 strikeouts in 142 innings pitched.

He died at age 75 in his hometown of Danville, Virginia.
