= Ed Keegan =

American baseball player (1939–2014)

- Pitcher
- Born: July 8, 1939; Camden, New Jersey, U.S.
- Died: October 19, 2014 (aged 75); Franklinville, New Jersey, U.S.
- Batted: Right Threw: Right

MLB debut
- August 24, 1959, for the Philadelphia Phillies

Last MLB appearance
- April 29, 1962, for the Philadelphia Phillies

MLB statistics
- Win–loss record: 0–3
- Earned run average: 9.00
- Strikeouts: 11
- Innings pitched: 23
- Stats at Baseball Reference

Teams
- Philadelphia Phillies (1959); Kansas City Athletics (1961); Philadelphia Phillies (1962)

Edward Charles Keegan (July 8, 1939 – October 19, 2014) was an American professional baseball player. The right-handed pitcher appeared in 13 games, three as a starter, in the Major Leagues for the Philadelphia Phillies (1959; 1962) and Kansas City Athletics (1961). He was listed as 6 feet 3 inches (1.91 m) tall and 165 pounds (75 kg) and was born in Camden, New Jersey.

Keegan's professional career extended from 1957 to 1962. He was signed by his hometown team, the Phillies, in 1957 after attending Haddonfield Memorial High School in Haddonfield, New Jersey. At the conclusion of his third minor league season, he was recalled by the Phillies in August 1959, given starting assignments against the Los Angeles Dodgers, Pittsburgh Pirates and St. Louis Cardinals, and dropped all three decisions. He spent all of 1960 in the minors, then was accorded a six-game trial as a relief pitcher by the Athletics in 1961 after they selected him in the Rule 5 draft. He recorded his only big-league save April 22 against the Cleveland Indians, but was returned to the Phillie system at the May cutdown. His MLB career concluded with four early-season relief appearances for the 1962 Phillies.

Keegan played his final big-league game on April 29, 1962, and retired from baseball after that season.

In 23 innings pitched in the Majors, he allowed 31 hits and 23 bases on balls, posting an ERA of 9.00 and an 0–3 record. He struck out 11.

A resident of the Malaga section of Franklin Township, Gloucester County, New Jersey, Keegan was active in local youth sports organizations.
