= Charlie O'Rourke (baseball) =

American baseball player (born 1937)

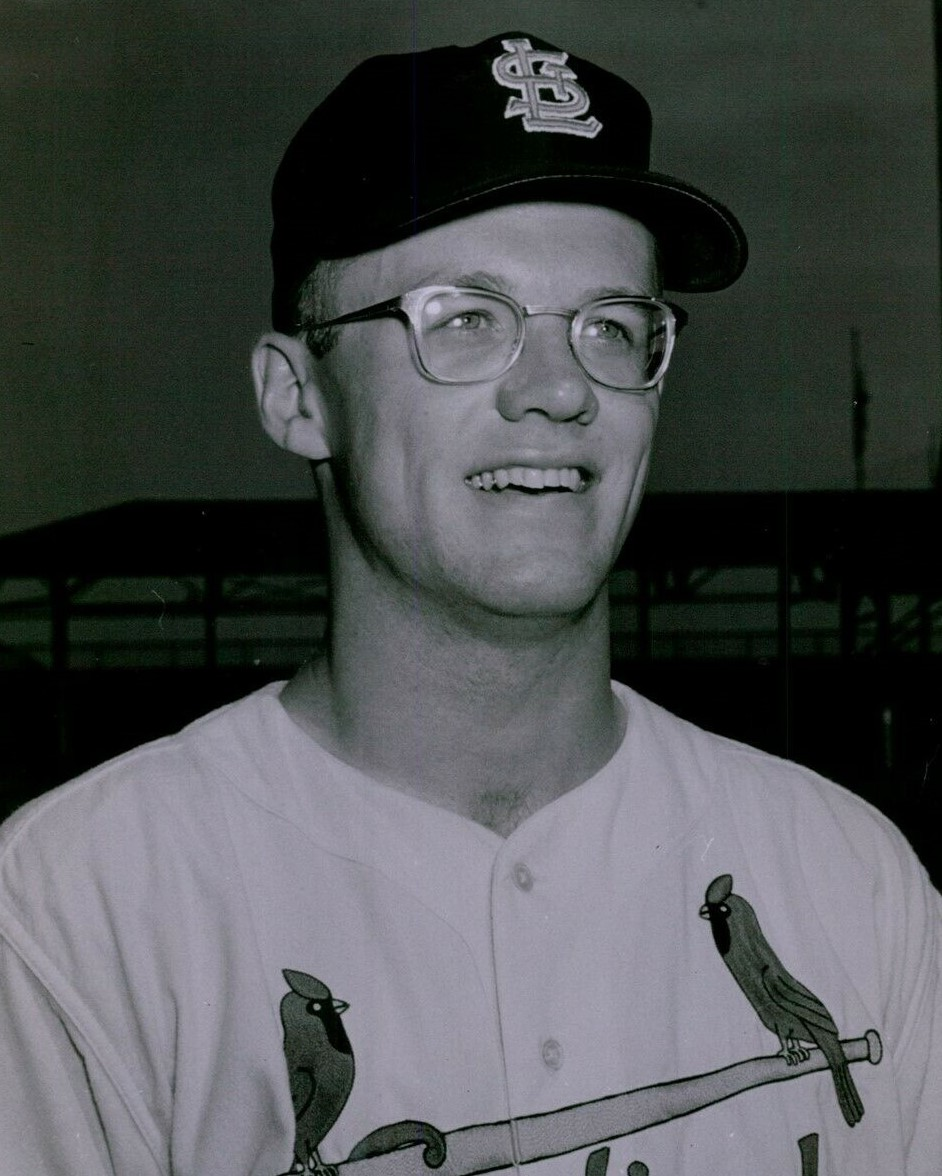
- Pinch hitter
- Born: June 22, 1937 (age 89); Walla Walla, Washington, U.S.
- Batted: Right Threw: Right

MLB debut
- June 16, 1959, for the St. Louis Cardinals

Last MLB appearance
- June 16, 1959, for the St. Louis Cardinals

MLB statistics
- Games played: 2
- At bats: 2
- Hits: 0
- Stats at Baseball Reference

Teams
- St. Louis Cardinals (1959)

James Patrick O'Rourke, identified as both Charlie and Jim (born June 22, 1937) is an American former professional baseball player. An outfielder by trade, O'Rourke played two games of Major League Baseball as a pinch hitter for the 1959 St. Louis Cardinals. He threw and batted right-handed, stood 6 feet 2 inches (1.88 m) tall and weighed 195 pounds (88 kg). He was born in Walla Walla, Washington, where he graduated from St. Patrick High School, and matriculated at Santa Clara University.

O'Rourke signed with the Cardinals in June 1959 for a $60,000 bonus and began his professional career on June 16, 1959, in a Major League uniform. He appeared in both ends of a twi-night doubleheader against the Philadelphia Phillies at Busch Stadium. In the opener, he batted for Cardinal shortstop Alex Grammas in the seventh inning; in the nightcap, also in the seventh, he hit for Redbird starting pitcher Ernie Broglio. In each case, O'Rourke bounced out to Phillie shortstop Joe Koppe. O'Rourke did not play in another Major League game. After his debut, he was sent to the minor leagues for more experience, but struggled as a hitter and retired after the 1962 season.
