= Bob Bowman (outfielder) =

American baseball player (1930-2017)

- Outfielder
- Born: May 10, 1930; Laytonville, California, U.S.
- Died: January 27, 2017 (aged 86); San Jose, California, U.S.
- Batted: Right Threw: Right

MLB debut
- April 16, 1955, for the Philadelphia Phillies

Last MLB appearance
- September 18, 1959, for the Philadelphia Phillies

MLB statistics
- Batting average: .249
- Home runs: 17
- Runs batted in: 54
- Stats at Baseball Reference

Teams
- Philadelphia Phillies (1955–1959)

Robert Leroy Bowman (May 10, 1930 – January 27, 2017) was an American professional baseball right fielder and pinch hitter, who played all or part of five seasons in Major League Baseball (MLB) for the Philadelphia Phillies (1955–1959). Late in his career, Bowman saw action as a relief pitcher, as well. He batted and threw right-handed, standing 6 ft 1 in (1.85 m) and weighing 195 lb (88 kg), during his playing days.

Bowman attended Abraham Lincoln High School (San Jose, California) and played right field for the Phillies from 1955 to 1958 and was noted for his strong throwing arm. The Phillies briefly tried converting Bowman to pitcher in 1959 when they were short arms in the bull pen. He made his first appearance pitching against the Pittsburgh Pirates on August 28. Bowman's first pitch was hit out by Smoky Burgess, but Bowman went on to pitch the rest of the game with two scoreless innings. He appeared six times overall in the majors. His only decision came on September 18, his final appearance in the major leagues, losing to the Chicago Cubs, 5–4, with Alvin Dark hitting a RBI double to score the winning run in the bottom of the 13th inning. When he returned to the minor leagues in 1960, he also returned to the outfield, pitching just four more times. Bowman holds two major league records with the highest pinch hitting batting average in 1958 and most pitching appearances as a position player with six appearances in 1959.

Bowman died in 2017 in San Jose, California, at the age of 86.
