= Al Schroll =

American baseball player (1932–1999)

- Pitcher
- Born: March 22, 1932; New Orleans, Louisiana, U.S.
- Died: November 30, 1999 (aged 67); Alexandria, Louisiana, U.S.
- Batted: Right Threw: Right

MLB debut
- April 20, 1958, for the Boston Red Sox

Last MLB appearance
- October 1, 1961, for the Minnesota Twins

MLB statistics
- Win–loss record: 6–9
- Earned run average: 5.34
- Strikeouts: 63
- Innings pitched: 118
- Stats at Baseball Reference

Teams
- Boston Red Sox (1958); Philadelphia Phillies (1959); Boston Red Sox (1959); Chicago Cubs (1960); Minnesota Twins (1961)

Albert Bringhurst Schroll (March 22, 1932 – November 30, 1999) was an American pitcher in Major League Baseball. Schroll played from 1958 through 1961 for the Boston Red Sox (1958–59), Philadelphia Phillies (1959), Chicago Cubs (1960) and Minnesota Twins (1961). Nicknamed "Bull" and listed at 6 feet 2 inches (1.88 m), 210 pounds (95 kg), he batted and threw right-handed. He was born in New Orleans and attended Tulane University.

Schroll signed with the Red Sox in 1951 and spent seven full years in minor league baseball before getting an opportunity to pitch for Boston. He debuted in April 1958 with five relief appearances, but spent the bulk of the year at Triple-A Minneapolis. Traded "conditionally" to the Philadelphia Phillies in October, he worked in three April 1959 games out of the bullpen, earning his first big-league win with a seven-inning relief effort to defeat the Cincinnati Reds on April 18. But six days later, Schroll was tagged with his first MLB defeat when he allowed three ninth-inning runs to the Pittsburgh Pirates, wiping out a 5–4 Phillie lead. He was returned to the Red Sox on May 7, and split the rest of the year between Minneapolis and Boston. On July 29, he threw his first complete game in the majors, holding the Cleveland Indians to six hits in a 4–1 triumph. It was his only win in a Red Sox uniform.

That December, he was traded to the Chicago Cubs for 36-year-old outfielder Bobby Thomson, the 1951 New York Giant hero entering the final year of his MLB career. Schroll made the 28-man Cub roster coming out of spring training, but worked only 22/3 innings before being sent to Triple-A Houston. He did not return to the majors until August 1961, as a member of the Twins, in their first season in Minnesota. The former Minneapolis Miller got his most sustained trial as a starting pitcher, with eight starts in August and September. He threw two complete games, and split eight decisions, but posted a poor 5.22 earned run average. He pitched two more years in the Twins' farm system in 1962–63, but never returned to the majors.

In a four-season MLB career, Schroll posted a 6–9 record with a 5.34 ERA in 35 appearances, including 13 starts, three complete games, 63 strikeouts, 64 walks. He allowed 121 hits in 118 innings of work.

Schroll was of German-Dutch ethnicity. He died in Alexandria, Louisiana from prostate cancer at the age of 67.
