= Roger McCardell =

American baseball player (1932-1996)

- Catcher
- Born: August 29, 1932; Baltimore County, Maryland, U.S.
- Died: November 13, 1996 (aged 64); Wilmington, Delaware, U.S.
- Batted: Right Threw: Right

MLB debut
- May 8, 1959, for the San Francisco Giants

Last MLB appearance
- June 8, 1959, for the San Francisco Giants

MLB statistics
- At bats: 4
- RBI: 0
- Home runs: 0
- Batting average: .000
- Stats at Baseball Reference

Teams
- San Francisco Giants (1959)

Roger Morton McCardell (August 29, 1932 – November 13, 1996) was an American professional baseball player. He played in Major League Baseball as a catcher for the San Francisco Giants in 1959.

== Baseball career ==
McCardell was born in Gorsuch Mills in Baltimore County, Maryland, and attended Boston University. He threw and batted right-handed and was listed at 6 feet (1.8 m) tall and 200 pounds (91 kg).

McCardell's professional career began in 1950 and he spent 11 seasons (and played in 911 games) in minor league baseball. His lone big-league trial occurred at the outset of the 1959 season. McCardell was the starting catcher in his MLB debut on May 8, and went hitless in two at bats against Danny McDevitt of the Los Angeles Dodgers before being removed for a pinch hitter. He went hitless in his two subsequent MLB at-bats as well.

He was traded by the Giants to the Baltimore Orioles on November 30, 1959 in a transaction headlined by Billy O'Dell and Jackie Brandt, but never appeared in a Major League game with his hometown club.

McCardell retired from baseball after the 1962 season and died in Wilmington, Delaware, at the age of 64.
