= Wally Shannon =

American baseball player (1933–1992)

- Second baseman / Shortstop
- Born: January 23, 1933; Cleveland, Ohio, U.S.
- Died: February 8, 1992 (aged 59); Creve Coeur, Missouri, U.S.
- Batted: Left Threw: Right

MLB debut
- July 9, 1959, for the St. Louis Cardinals

Last MLB appearance
- May 26, 1960, for the St. Louis Cardinals

MLB statistics
- Batting average: .263
- Home runs: 0
- Runs batted in: 6
- Stats at Baseball Reference

Teams
- St. Louis Cardinals (1959–1960)

Walter Charles Shannon (January 23, 1933 – February 8, 1992) was an American professional baseball player, a second baseman and shortstop who appeared in parts of two seasons for the 1959–1960 St. Louis Cardinals of Major League Baseball. Born in Cleveland, Ohio, he batted left-handed, threw right-handed, stood 6 feet (1.8 m) tall and weighed 178 pounds (81 kg). He was the son of Walter G. Shannon (1907–1994), a longtime scout, director of scouting, and front office executive for the Cardinals, Cleveland Indians, Baltimore Orioles, California Angels and Milwaukee Brewers.

Wally Shannon attended Washington University in St. Louis where he played college baseball for the Washington University Bears. He signed with the Cardinals in 1951 and was called to the Major Leagues in July 1959 after batting .291 with 13 home runs for the Rochester Red Wings of the Triple-A International League. In 47 MLB games as a pinch hitter and backup infielder, Shannon collected 27 hits, including five doubles. But in 1960 Shannon was sent back to the minor leagues for good in May after only 18 games with the Cards, three as a starter, and he played the rest of his ten-season career in the minors.

In 65 Major League games, Shannon had 31 hits and a lifetime batting average of .263. After his retirement as a player, Shannon was a scout for the New York Mets during Bing Devine's tenure as the team's president. Shannon died at Creve Coeur, Missouri, from a heart attack at the age of 59.
