= Don Choate =

American baseball player (1938–2018)

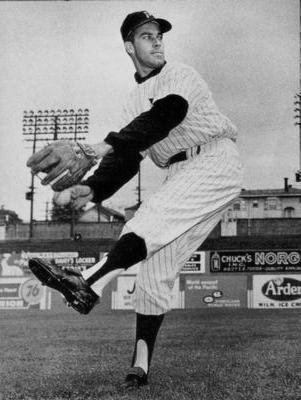
- Pitcher
- Born: July 2, 1938; Potosi, Missouri, U.S.
- Died: February 4, 2018 (aged 79); Fairview Heights, Illinois, U.S.
- Batted: Right Threw: Right

MLB debut
- September 12, 1960, for the San Francisco Giants

Last MLB appearance
- September 28, 1960, for the San Francisco Giants

MLB statistics
- Win–loss record: 0–0
- Earned run average: 2.25
- Innings pitched: 8
- Stats at Baseball Reference

Teams
- San Francisco Giants (1960)

Donald Leon Choate (July 2, 1938 – February 4, 2018) was an American professional baseball player. The right-handed pitcher appeared in four Major League games, all in relief, for the San Francisco Giants in 1960. He stood 6 feet (1.8 m) tall and weighed 185 pounds (84 kg).

Choate was originally signed by the St. Louis Cardinals, and posted a 19–8 record in his second professional season with the Class C Billings Mustangs in 1957. After splitting the next year between Double-A and Triple-A Cardinal affiliates he was traded to Giants as a prospect as part of a major off-season trade that netted first baseman Bill White, future National League president, for the Redbirds. White became a star player — a five-time NL All Star and seven-time Gold Glove winner — as well as a team leader of the 1964 world champion Cardinals.

Choate's only Major League service came in September 1960 when he was recalled from the Triple-A Tacoma Giants. In eight MLB innings pitched, he gave up two earned runs, seven hits and four bases on balls, with seven strikeouts. He hurt his shoulder moving a cabinet out of spring training in 1961. The cabinet opened and caught him on his shoulder.

== Personal life and death ==
Choate had four children with his wife, Norma, who preceded him in death in 1995.

Choate attended East St. Louis Senior High School.

After his professional career in baseball ended, due to an injury to his pitching arm, Choate became a firefighter in East St. Louis, Illinois, retiring after 27 years.

Choate died at his home on February 4, 2018, of lung cancer, at the age of 79.
