= Rubén Gómez (baseball) =

Puerto Rican baseball player (1927–2004)

- Gómez with the Giants
- Pitcher
- Born: July 13, 1927; Arroyo, Puerto Rico
- Died: July 26, 2004 (aged 77); Carolina, Puerto Rico
- Batted: Right Threw: Right

MLB debut
- April 17, 1953, for the New York Giants

Last MLB appearance
- May 2, 1967, for the Philadelphia Phillies

MLB statistics
- Win–loss record: 76–86
- Earned run average: 4.09
- Strikeouts: 677
- Stats at Baseball Reference

Teams
- New York / San Francisco Giants (1953–1958); Philadelphia Phillies (1959–1960); Cleveland Indians (1962); Minnesota Twins (1962); Philadelphia Phillies (1967)

Career highlights and awards
- World Series champion (1954)

Member of the Caribbean

Baseball Hall of Fame
- Induction: 1999

Rubén Gómez (July 13, 1927 – July 26, 2004) was a Puerto Rican professional right-handed starting pitcher who became the first Puerto Rican to pitch in a World Series game. He was also the winning pitcher in the first Major League Baseball game played west of Kansas City. In 1954, Gómez became the first black Latino to win a World Series game. Afterwards, he played in Canada, the Dominican Republic, Mexico and Cuba. In his homeland, Gómez was nicknamed El Divino Loco ("the Divine Madman"), on account of his willingness to pitch in tough situations and #22.

== Major league career ==
Gómez (birth name: Rubén Gómez Colón (Note: Gómez's birth name follows Spanish naming customs: the first or paternal family name is "Gómez" and the second or maternal family name is "Colón".)) was born in Arroyo, Puerto Rico. He debuted with the New York Giants on April 17, 1953. He finished his rookie season with a 13–11 record. Gómez created some controversy when, on the order of Giants' manager Leo Durocher, he hit Brooklyn Dodgers player Carl Furillo with a pitch. Gómez would hit other notables with pitches in his career, including Joe Adcock and Frank Robinson.

After going 17–9 in his second season, Gómez pitched and won Game 3 of the 1954 World Series in the Giants sweep of the Cleveland Indians. He thus became the first Puerto Rican player to be a member of a World Series championship team, becoming a hero in his native country (schools closed the day he pitched in the World Series so students could watch the game). When Gómez returned to Puerto Rico, he was greeted by thousands of fans at the San Juan airport and a holiday was declared.

After the 1957 season, the Dodgers and Giants moved to Los Angeles and San Francisco, respectively. On April 15, 1958, Gómez made baseball history when he pitched an 8–0 shutout against the Dodgers at San Francisco's Seals Stadium in the first Major League Baseball game played on the West Coast. He thus became the first pitcher to win a game played on the West Coast; the losing pitcher was future Hall of Famer Don Drysdale.

In 1958, Gómez was traded to the Phillies. In the 1959 season he was only 3–8 in 72 innings, and went 0–3 in 1960. He was out of the major leagues in 1961 and returned in 1962 to pitch for both the Indians and the Twins, compiling a combined 2–3 record. Five years later he returned to finish his major league career with 11 1/3 innings for the Phillies.

== Other professional leagues ==
Gómez later went to the Mexican League, where he pitched with Veracruz, Mexico. One day a young boy begged Gómez to buy a lottery ticket that he was selling to make some badly needed money. The boy insisted that Gómez buy the ticket because his uniform number matched that of the ticket, and Gómez, who did not normally buy such tickets, agreed. To his great surprise the ticket was a winner of a $35,000 prize. Gómez attempted to share the money with the boy's family and when they refused, he went to a local bank and set up a trust fund for the lad, to be given to him at age 18. In 1967, Gómez was 39 years old and still playing with Veracruz, when the Phillies gave him another shot. He pitched only 11 1/3 innings that season in seven games, making his last appearance on May 2, 1967.

Between 1947 and 1977, Gómez played 28 winter seasons with the Cangrejeros de Santurce and Vaqueros de Bayamón of the Puerto Rican league, setting league marks for a pitcher in wins (174) and ERA (2.97). In 1947, Rubén Gómez won the LBPPR's Rookie of the Year in his debut for the Cangrejeros de Santurce. He led the league in wins in 1949–50 (14), 1951–52 (14) and 1958–59 (12). As part of a series between Santurce and San Juan, he threw 17 no score games against the Senadores. Gómez was the first LBPPR pitcher to reach 1,000 strikeouts and finished with 1,390. He also led in innings played with 2,486, wins with 174 (ERA 2.97) and games pitched 417. His longevity of 29 years also made him the pitcher with most losses with 119. In addition, his six victories in the Caribbean World Series ties him with José Bracho and Camilo Pascual for the most all-time wins in the tournament.

Gómez also pitched in the Venezuelan league for the Navegantes del Magallanes during the 1965–1966 season, and from 1968 to 1970 in the Saguenay senior league for the Chicoutimi Bombardiers. He was the star of the league. His first year with Chicoutimi he got a perfect record of 12–0 and an earned run average of 1.20. Next year, 1969, he went 9–1 with a 0.82 ERA. Two other former MLB players also played in that league: Art Ditmar and Wayne Granger.

Baseball historians Bill James and Rob Neyer have ranked Gómez's screwball the tenth-best of all time.

== Later years ==
Gómez retired at the age of 50 and was inducted into the Puerto Rico Sports Hall of Fame in 1985 and the Puerto Rican Baseball Hall of Fame in 1991 and the Caribbean Series Hall of Fame in 1999. He was also inducted in the regional hall of Santurce. In 1999, Gómez was included in the LBPPR's 20th century team.

In 2001, Gómez was hospitalized after a lengthy fight against cancer, and was about to receive surgery. A doctor from Mexico requested permission to attend the operation. When Gómez asked the doctor why he had come, he replied, "I was that little boy, the money that you left in trust was enough to pay for my medical school."

Rubén Gómez Colón died in Carolina, Puerto Rico, at the age of 77. Among those who attended his funeral services was his best friend and countryman, former big leaguer Luis Rodríguez Olmo. Gómez was buried in the Guayama Municipal Cemetery in Guayama, Puerto Rico.

== See also ==
- List of Puerto Ricans
- Players from Puerto Rico in MLB
