= Don Larsen's perfect game =

Perfect game pitched in the 1956 World Series

- The "everlasting image" of Yogi Berra leaping into Larsen's arms upon the completion of the perfect game
Brooklyn Dodgers	New York Yankees
0	2
	1	2	3	4	5	6	7	8	9	R	H	E
Brooklyn Dodgers	0	0	0	0	0	0	0	0	0	0	0	0
New York Yankees	0	0	0	1	0	1	0	0	X	2	5	0
- Date: October 8, 1956; 1956 World Series Game 5
- Venue: Yankee Stadium
- City: The Bronx, New York City, New York
- Managers: Walter Alston (Brooklyn Dodgers); Casey Stengel (New York Yankees)
- Umpires: HP: Babe Pinelli (National League); 1B: Hank Soar (American League); 2B: Dusty Boggess (NL); 3B: Larry Napp (AL); LF: Tom Gorman (NL); RF: Ed Runge (AL)
- Attendance: 64,519
- Time of game: 2:06
- Television: NBC
- TV announcers: Mel Allen, Vin Scully
- Radio: Mutual Broadcasting System
- Radio announcers: Bob Neal, Bob Wolff

On October 8, 1956, in Game 5 of the 1956 World Series, pitcher Don Larsen of the New York Yankees threw a perfect game against the Brooklyn Dodgers at Yankee Stadium. It was the only no-hitter in World Series history until the Houston Astros pitching staff of Cristian Javier, Bryan Abreu, Rafael Montero and Ryan Pressly threw a combined no-hitter in Game 4 of the 2022 World Series against the Philadelphia Phillies. It remains the only perfect game in the history of the World Series.

== Background ==
Don Larsen of the New York Yankees made his first start in a World Series in Game 4 of the 1955 World Series against the Brooklyn Dodgers. Larsen pitched four innings, allowing five runs on five hits and losing the game 8–3. The Dodgers won the series in seven games for their first world championship.

The Yankees and Dodgers faced each other again in the 1956 World Series. Behind Sal Maglie, the Dodgers defeated the Yankees in Game 1. Casey Stengel, the manager of the Yankees, selected Larsen to start Game 2 against the Dodgers' Don Newcombe. Despite being given a 6–0 lead by the Yankees' batters, he lasted only 1 2/3 innings against the Dodgers in a 13–8 loss. He gave up only one hit, a single by Gil Hodges, but walked four batters, which led to four runs in the process, but none of them were earned because of an error by first baseman Joe Collins. The Yankees won Games 3 and 4 to tie the series at two games apiece.

== Game 5 ==
With the series tied at two games apiece, Larsen started Game 5 for the Yankees. Yogi Berra was catching and calling the pitches. Larsen's opponent in the game was Maglie. The Yankees scored two runs off Maglie, as Mickey Mantle hit a home run in the fourth inning and Hank Bauer hit a single for a run batted in two innings later. Larsen retired all 27 batters he faced to complete the perfect game.

Larsen needed just 97 pitches to complete the game, and only one Dodger batter (Pee Wee Reese in the first inning) was able to get a three-ball count. In 1998, Larsen recalled, "I had great control. I never had that kind of control in my life."

The closest the Dodgers came to a hit was in the second inning, when Jackie Robinson hit a line drive off third baseman Andy Carey's glove, the ball caroming to shortstop Gil McDougald, who threw Robinson out by a step, and in the fifth, when Mickey Mantle ran down Gil Hodges' deep fly ball in left center, making a spectacular backhanded catch.

Yankees fielders recorded three more lineouts: Duke Snider hit a ball to Hank Bauer in right field in the first, Mantle made another catch playing in on a hard-hit ball by Maglie in the third, and third baseman Carey caught a low liner by Hodges in the eighth.

In addition to these balls put into play by the Dodgers, the half-inning that featured Mantle's catch on Hodges was bookended by hard-hit foul balls by Jackie Robinson, who "gave it a ride" on a 1–2 pitch and Sandy Amoros, whose ball reached the upper deck with home-run distance.

Maglie gave up only two runs on five hits in eight innings and was perfect himself until Mantle's homer broke the scoreless tie. The Yankees added an insurance run in the sixth as Hank Bauer's single scored Carey, who had opened the inning with a single and was sacrificed to second by Larsen.

In the Dodgers' ninth, Larsen retired Carl Furillo on a flyout to Bauer, then Roy Campanella on a grounder to second baseman Billy Martin. Finally, Larsen faced pinch hitter Dale Mitchell, a .312 career hitter. Throwing fastballs, Larsen got ahead in the count at 1–2. On his 97th pitch, Larsen struck out Mitchell for the 27th consecutive and final out. Mitchell tried to check his swing on the final pitch, but home plate umpire Babe Pinelli, who would retire at the end of this World Series, called it a strike. Mitchell, who struck out only 119 times in 3,984 at-bats (or once every 34 at-bats) during his career, always maintained that the third strike he took was really a ball. Examination of footage of the pitch appears to show Mitchell's check swing going past the halfway "plane" and nowadays would normally be called a swinging strike.

The Yankees went on to win the series in seven games.

At the end of the game, catcher Yogi Berra leaped into Larsen's arms after the final out. With the death of Berra on September 22, 2015, Larsen was the last living player for either team who played in this game, until his death on January 1, 2020, at the age of 90.

=== Linescore ===
Team	1	2	3	4	5	6	7	8	9	R	H	E
Brooklyn	0	0	0	0	0	0	0	0	0	0	0	0
New York	0	0	0	1	0	1	0	0	X	2	5	0
WP: Don Larsen (1–0) LP: Sal Maglie (1–1); Home runs: BKN: None; NYY: Mickey Mantle (3)

== Broadcast ==
=== Television ===
NBC televised the game, with announcers Mel Allen for the Yankees and Vin Scully for the Dodgers. In 2006, it was announced that a nearly-complete kinescope recording of the telecast had been preserved and discovered by a collector. That black and white kinescope recording aired during the MLB Network's first night on the air on January 1, 2009, supplemented with an interview of both Larsen and Yogi Berra by Bob Costas. The first inning of the telecast is still considered lost and was not aired by the MLB Network or included in a subsequent DVD release of the game.

However, parts of the first inning appear in one of the two known color films of the game, an 8 mm color film shot by Saul Terry. This includes a backpedaling, tumbling catch by second baseman Billy Martin in the top of the inning. Terry and his wife, Elissa, attended the game after driving across the country from Los Angeles on their honeymoon. Instead of receiving tickets to My Fair Lady on Broadway, they were given tickets to Game 5 of the World Series. His film also includes footage of Mickey Mantle's catch in center field; Whitey Ford warming up in the bullpen in the 9th inning; Duke Snider making a tumbling catch; and Larsen's last pitch and bear hug from Yogi Berra, as the Yankees and stadium security guards come running out of the dugout before the crowd runs across the field. Elissa Terry said in 2020 that it remains the only Major League Baseball game she has ever attended.

The film was lost for 50 years, until Terry found it on a canister entitled "New York Trip" in 2006, while making a family film for his 50th wedding anniversary. The film was shown to Larsen, Berra, Tony Kubek, Frank Howard, Bucky Dent, Moose Skowron, and several other former Yankees at a dinner in Palm Beach Gardens, Florida in 2007. Terry's family now owns the film. Terry, who died in 2006, also shot footage of the first Dodgers game in Los Angeles at the L.A. Coliseum in 1958, which appears later on the same canister, and was identified several years after the Larsen film by his family.

In 2020, Tim Rowland wrote about Saul Terry's color film of Don Larsen's Perfect Game for the Herald Mail: "The Lesson of Don Larsen: Who Knows When Greatness will Strike?"

The other color film of the perfect game is 16 mm and was shot by Professional Golfers' Association member Al Mengert, who played in the Masters Tournament with Sam Snead.

Terry and Mengert's stories were reported in The New York Times in a 2007 article by Richard Sandomir.

=== Radio ===
The entire 1956 World Series was broadcast on the radio by the Mutual Broadcasting System, with Bob Wolff and Bob Neal teaming up as the announcers. Handling the play-by-play duties for the latter part of Don Larsen's perfect game, Bob Wolff strictly adhered to the tradition of not talking about a no-hitter or perfect game while it is still in progress. Wolff never explicitly used either term but instead referred to these circumstances implicitly at several points late in the game.

At the end of the seventh inning, for instance, he said, "That's 21 in a row retired by Larsen." Moreover, he eloquently contributed to the drama that was unfolding by remarking later in the game that "there's a hum of expectancy here as the 8th inning gets under way" or addressing his viewers with comments like, "You who are listening are well-informed of the drama that Larsen holds right within his pitching hand."

== Aftermath ==
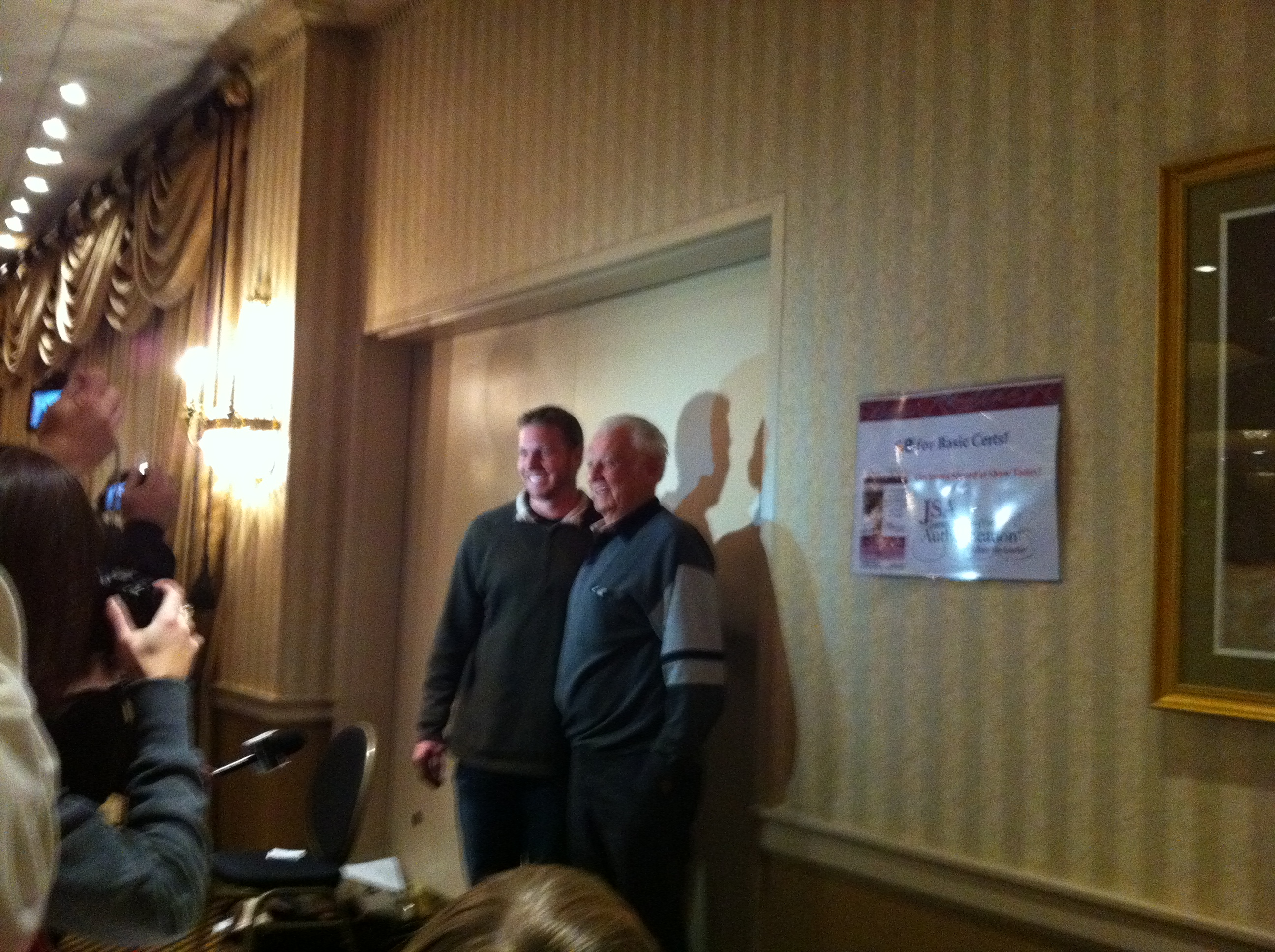
Roy Halladay and Don Larsen (right), the only pitchers to throw individual postseason nine inning no-hitters in MLB history

The Dodgers won Game 6 of the series 1–0 in 10 innings, but the Yankees won the decisive Game 7 by a 9–0 score. Larsen's performance earned him the World Series Most Valuable Player Award and the Babe Ruth Award. When the World Series ended, Larsen did a round of endorsements and promotional work around the United States, but he stopped soon after because it was "disrupting his routine".

During an MLB Network interview about the game, Larsen admitted that while he knew he had pitched a no-hitter with no one reaching base, he was unaware that this achievement was classified as a perfect game. Because there had not been a perfect game since Charlie Robertson's in 1922, he thought he had simply accomplished an "extra good no-hitter" until someone in the clubhouse informed him afterward.

== See also ==
- List of Major League Baseball perfect games
- List of Major League Baseball no-hitters
