= Sal Maglie =

American baseball player (1917–1992)

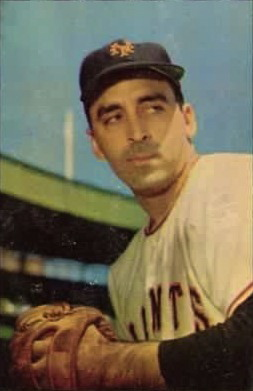
- Maglie's 1953 Bowman Gum card
- Pitcher
- Born: April 26, 1917; Niagara Falls, New York, U.S.
- Died: December 28, 1992 (aged 75); Niagara Falls, New York, U.S.
- Batted: Right Threw: Right

MLB debut
- August 9, 1945, for the New York Giants

Last MLB appearance
- August 31, 1958, for the St. Louis Cardinals

MLB statistics
- Win–loss record: 119–62
- Earned run average: 3.15
- Strikeouts: 862
- Stats at Baseball Reference

Teams
- New York Giants (1945, 1950–1955); Cleveland Indians (1955–1956); Brooklyn Dodgers (1956–1957); New York Yankees (1957–1958); St. Louis Cardinals (1958)

Career highlights and awards
- 2× All-Star (1951, 1952); World Series champion (1954); NL wins leader (1951); NL ERA leader (1950); Pitched a No-hitter on September 25, 1956

Salvatore Anthony Maglie (April 26, 1917 – December 28, 1992) was an American pitcher in Major League Baseball (MLB), and later a scout and a pitching coach. He played from 1945 to 1958 for the New York Giants, Cleveland Indians, Brooklyn Dodgers, New York Yankees, and St. Louis Cardinals. Maglie was known as "Sal the Barber", because he gave close shaves—that is, pitched inside to hitters. A gentle personality off the field went unnoticed during games, his foreboding physical appearance contributing to his menacing presence on a pitcher's mound. He was the last of 14 players to play for the Giants, Dodgers and Yankees at a time when all three teams were in New York City. During a 10-year major league baseball career, Maglie compiled 119 wins, 862 strikeouts, and a 3.15 earned run average.

Born and raised in Niagara Falls, New York, Maglie had to play ball secretly growing up because his parents discouraged it. Signed by the Buffalo Bisons of the International League in 1938, he pitched in the minor leagues for five years, then took two years off during World War II to work at a Niagara Falls defense plant. He started pitching again with the Jersey City Giants in 1945, then made his major league debut with the Giants later that year at the age of 28, starting 10 games for the Giants. It would be five years before he returned to the major leagues, as he joined the upstart Mexican League in 1946 and was subsequently blacklisted from Major League Baseball (MLB) for five years by Commissioner Happy Chandler. Not until he was 33 in 1950 did Maglie become a full-time pitcher in the major leagues.

For the first part of the 1950 season, Maglie pitched out of the bullpen for the Giants. Moved into the starting rotation midseason, he threw shutouts in four straight starts and pitched 45 consecutive scoreless innings. Emerging as the Giants' ace in 1951, he led the National League (NL) with 23 wins as the Giants reached the 1951 World Series. Maglie followed this with an 18-win performance in 1952, but back trouble threatened his career in 1953. Inserting a lift into one of his shoes to correct a tilted pelvis, he returned in 1954, winning the game which clinched the NL pennant for the Giants as the team won the 1954 World Series. Maglie spent one more season with the Giants in 1955 before being claimed off waivers by the Indians on July 31. Seldom used with Cleveland, Maglie joined the Dodgers in May 1956 and went on to finish second in NL Most Valuable Player (MVP) and MLB Cy Young Award voting. He threw a no-hitter against the Philadelphia Phillies on September 25 and pitched in the 1956 World Series. Maglie spent three more seasons with the Dodgers, Yankees, and Cardinals before retiring in 1959. During his career, he had a 1–2 record in four World Series starts and also appeared in two of baseball's most famous games, Bobby Thomson's Shot Heard 'Round the World game in 1951 and Don Larsen's perfect game in 1956.

After his playing career, Maglie served one year (1959) as a scout for the Cardinals, two stints (1960–62; 1966–67) with the Boston Red Sox as a pitching coach, and one season (1969) with the Seattle Pilots as a pitching coach. He held a variety of jobs in Niagara Falls before retiring in 1979. In 1983, Hyde Park Stadium in his hometown was renamed Sal Maglie Stadium. Maglie died on December 28, 1992, due to bronchial pneumonia complications.

== Early life ==
Salvatore Anthony Maglie was born on April 26, 1917, in Niagara Falls, New York, the youngest of three children of Giuseppe Maglie and Maria Breve. His father, an Italian immigrant from Taranto, worked blue collar jobs around town. Sal showed an interest in baseball from an early age, but his parents discouraged it, and he tried to keep his playing a secret from them. When he played sandlot ball, he was not initially good at pitching and usually played other positions. Niagara Falls High School did not have a baseball team, though he did become a basketball star for them. He was offered a basketball scholarship by Niagara University but turned it down because baseball was his favorite sport.

After high school, Maglie worked for Union Carbide, pitching on the company team as well as for local semipro teams. In 1937, he tried out as a pitcher for the Rochester Red Wings but was rejected after just three pitches. However, while pitching for the Niagara Cataracts (a local semipro team) in 1938, he caught the attention of Steve O'Neill. The manager of the Double-A Buffalo Bisons of the International League, he was impressed enough with Maglie's skills to sign the pitcher to a contract.

== Playing career ==
=== Minor leagues (1938–45) ===
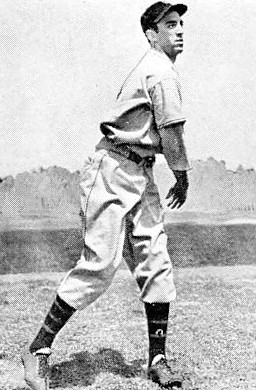
Sal Maglie as a member of the Buffalo Bisons in 1940

Maglie began his professional career with Buffalo in 1938, appearing in five games and posting a 3.75 earned run average (ERA) while losing his only decision. He spent a full season with Buffalo in 1939, pitching in 39 games (eight starts) but posting a 4.99 ERA and a 3–7 record. In 1940, he struggled to an 0–7 record and a 7.17 ERA in 23 games (five starts) before asking to be sent to a lower-level minor league circuit in order to hone his skills.

For the rest of the 1940 season, Maglie pitched for the Class D Jamestown Falcons of the Pennsylvania–Ontario–New York League (PONY League), where he had a lower ERA (2.74) and a 3–4 record in seven starts. In 1941, Maglie pitched for the Single-A Elmira Pioneers of the Eastern League. He credited team owner and former major league pitcher Jack Ogden with teaching him one of the most important lessons he learned in his whole baseball career. "Sal, when you pitch," Ogden said, "pitch to that man that's at the plate. Don't worry about the man that's up next." Maglie led the league in games pitched (43) and innings pitched (270) and ranked among the leaders in wins (20, second only to Red Embree's 21) and losses (15, fourth) His ERA was 2.67.

The United States became involved in World War II that December, but Maglie was spared from having enlist in military service when he failed his physical; a chronic sinus condition kept him from enlisting. Since many players were unavailable, the New York Giants signed him and assigned him to their Double-A affiliate, the Jersey City Giants of the International League. Maglie was used mainly out of the bullpen, making only seven starts among his 50 games, but he had a 9–6 record and a 2.78 ERA. However, he resigned after the season to serve the war effort domestically, by working in a defense plant in Niagara Falls for two years.

Maglie returned to Jersey City at the beginning of the 1945 season, where he was this time used as a starter. Through August, he had a 3–7 record and a 4.09 ERA in 13 games (nine starts). That month, he was promoted to the major league Giants.

=== Rookie season (1945) ===
On August 9, 1945, Maglie made his major league debut, relieving Harry Feldman in the fourth inning and pitching 2/3 innings without allowing any runs to score in a 5–3 loss to the St. Louis Cardinals. He made his first major league start on August 14, throwing a complete game and allowing just two runs in a 5–2 victory over the Cincinnati Reds. In his next start, he threw a shutout against the Pittsburgh Pirates, allowing only three hits. On September 3 and September 7, he threw two more shutouts in back-to-back outings. In 13 games (10 starts) during his rookie season, he had a 5–4 record, a 2.35 ERA, 32 strikeouts, 22 walks, and 72 hits allowed in 84 1/3 innings pitched.

=== Mexican League, suspension (1946–1949) ===
A candidate to rejoin the Giants' rotation in 1946, Maglie attended spring training with the ballclub but was not happy with how he was treated by Mel Ott, the Giants' manager. Mexican League president Jorge Pasquel, whom Maglie had met while playing winter ball in Cuba during the 1945-46 offseason, was offering large contracts to players who would leave the major leagues to come play in the Mexican League, and Maglie accepted the offer. Because of this, Maglie was banned from organized baseball by Commissioner Happy Chandler along with other players who left. For the next two seasons, he pitched for the Pericos de Puebla, managed by Dolf Luque, who had been Maglie's pitching coach with the Giants and his Cuban winter league team. It was from Luque that Maglie learned the art of throwing high, inside pitches that just missed the batters' heads, diminishing their confidence. In 1946, he had a 20–12 record and a 3.19 ERA for Puebla. His win–loss record was very similar in 1947, as he had a 20–13 record, this time with a 3.92 ERA.

Several other major leaguers, such as Max Lanier, Danny Gardella, and Mickey Owen, had also made the jump to the Mexican League, but the presence of these players failed to generate enough revenue to justify expenses. With the Mexican League in disarray, Maglie stopped pitching for Puebla after 1947, but he could not rejoin the Giants because he was still banned. He joined a barnstorming team in 1948 that Lanier had organized; however, the team's earnings failed to cover expenses, and they folded in August 1948. Maglie went back to Niagara Falls and purchased a house and a gas station, but he still wanted to play baseball and joined the Drummondville Cubs of the independent Provincial League in 1949, leading the team to a league championship. On June 5 of that year, Chandler lifted the ban on the players who had jumped to the Mexican League, but Maglie chose to spend the entire season with Drummondville. He returned to the Giants in 1950.

=== New York Giants (1950–1955) ===
After his return to the majors, Maglie was integral to the success of the New York Giants teams of the early 1950s, gaining a reputation as one of the game's best pitchers despite being 33 before he ever pitched a full season in the majors. He made the team out of spring training in 1950, but manager Leo Durocher used him sparingly the first part of the year, unimpressed right away with his new pitcher. Maglie emerged as the mainstay of the Giants' bullpen in the first part of the 1950 season. On July 21, he got a chance to start and worked 11 innings, emerging the victor in a 5–4 triumph over the Cardinals. After that, he became part of the starting rotation. From August 16 through September 4, he threw 45 consecutive scoreless innings, narrowly missing the National League (NL) record of 45 1/3 straight scoreless innings set by Hall of Famer Carl Hubbell, also of the Giants, in 1933. Included in the streak were four straight shutouts, the most by a major leaguer since Doc White threw five straight in 1904. Hubbell congratulated Maglie after the game, and as of 2020, the streak was still the eighth-longest in major league history (tied with Cy Young's 1904 streak and White's 1904 streak). After losing a game on July 16, Maglie won 11 decisions in a row, not losing again until September 21, his final loss of the season. Though not used as a starter regularly until July 21 and making just 16 starts, he led the NL in winning percentage (.818), ERA (2.71), and shutouts (five). He had an 18–4 record (his 18 wins were the eighth-most in the NL), and he gave up 169 hits in 206 innings pitched. He finished 10th in NL Most Valuable Player (MVP) voting after the season.

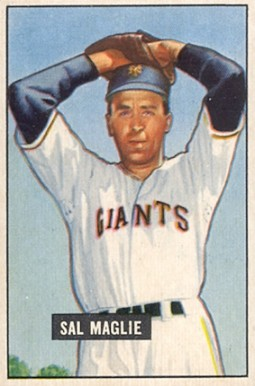
1951 Bowman Gum baseball card of Maglie with the New York Giants

By the 1951 season, Maglie had emerged as the ace of the Giants' staff. After back-to-back losses in April, he won nine games in a row from April 30 through June 5. After allowing a leadoff triple to Pete Castiglione on May 4, he allowed no further hits in a complete game, 5–1 victory over the Pirates. On May 27, he gave up just two hits in a 2–0 shutout victory over the Philadelphia Phillies. Three hits were all he allowed on June 26 in a 4–0, shutout victory over the Brooklyn Dodgers. He was named to the All-Star Game, the first of two consecutive selections. Though he allowed two runs in three innings, he was credited with the victory in the NL's 8–3 triumph. In the thick of a pennant race with the Dodgers, the Giants trailed by 11 games on August 11. Beginning August 12, Maglie won five decisions in a row and only lost one more game the full season, posting an 8–1 record and a 2.50 ERA down the stretch as the Giants forced a tie with the Dodgers at the end of the season. Against the Boston Braves on September 29, Maglie outpitched future Hall of Famer Warren Spahn, allowing five hits and no runs in a 3–0 shutout victory. Maglie and teammate Larry Jansen tied for the NL lead with 23 wins, and Maglie lost just six games while ranking among the league leaders in win percentage (.793, topped only by Preacher Roe's .880), ERA (2.93, topped only by Chet Nichols's 2.88), strikeouts (146, topped only by Don Newcombe's and Spahn's 164), and innings pitched (298, topped only by Robin Roberts's 315 and Spahn's 310 2/3). He finished fourth in NL MVP voting.

The Dodgers played the Giants in a best-of-three tie-breaker series at the end of the year, and Maglie started the deciding third game on October 3. He allowed a run in the first but settled down after that, retiring 11 batters in a row at one point. He allowed three more runs in the eighth and was pinch-hit for by Hank Thompson in the bottom of the inning with the Giants trailing 4–1. However, the Giants rallied in the ninth, ultimately winning on Bobby Thomson's Shot Heard 'Round the World home run. The Giants faced the New York Yankees in the 1951 World Series, and Maglie started Game 4 but took the loss after giving up four runs in five innings, including a fifth-inning home run to Joe DiMaggio that reporter James Hirsch called "the turning point of the game." The Giants lost the series in six games.

After his stellar 1951 season, Maglie wanted a $40,000 contract from the Giants, but the team only wanted to pay him $32,500 for the season. The parties agreed to a compromise of $35,000 on February 21, 1952. Maglie started the 1952 season with a nine-game winning streak, including three shutouts. After Willie Mays left to serve a term in the United States Army on May 29, however, Maglie struggled in his next five starts, attributing part of the problem to the loss of Mays. "You didn't have to worry about striking guys out all the time...you knew that somehow Willie would get [balls hit to centerfield]. That takes a lot of pressure off the pitcher and gives him a chance to save his best stuff for the real tight spots." On June 26, he held the Dodgers to three hits in a 3–0 shutout. He also threw a shutout on August 9, allowing eight hits in the first game of a doubleheader against the Chicago Cubs. At season's end, Maglie was again among the league leaders in several statistics, including wins (18, topped only by Roberts's 28), winning percentage (.692, sixth), ERA (2.92, tenth), strikeouts (112, tied with Murry Dickson for tenth), and shutouts (five, tied with three others for third). He finished 23rd in NL MVP voting.

On April 30, 1953, Maglie threw a six-hit shutout in a 1–0 victory over the Milwaukee Braves. In the first game of a doubleheader against Pittsburgh on May 10, he gave up just three hits in a 4–0 shutout victory. On June 24, he picked up his third shutout of the season in a 3–0 victory over the Cardinals. However, he suffered from back problems that year and never pitched more than 4 2/3 innings in a game after July 16, posting an 8.88 ERA and losing all five of his decisions after that date. In 27 games (24 starts), he had an 8–9 record, a 4.15 ERA, 80 strikeouts, 47 walks, and 158 hits allowed in 145 1/3 innings.

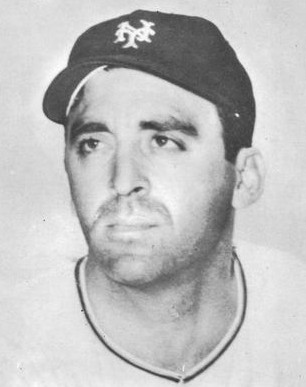
Jay Publishing image from a 1955 card of Maglie with the Giants

Maglie's career seemed to be over, but a chiropractor prescribed him an eighth-inch thick lift for one of his shoes to correct a tilted pelvis. In the first game of a doubleheader against Philadelphia on April 25, 1954, he threw a five-hit shutout in a 3–0 victory. On April 30 against the Cubs, he gave up two runs in 14 innings, winning the game after Mays hit a go-ahead run against Warren Hacker in the top of the 14th. He also beat the Cubs on July 21, allowing four hits and one run in a complete game, 2–1 victory. Against Cincinnati on July 31, he threw 7 1/3 shutout innings and picked up the win. He allowed five hits and one run on August 27 in a complete game, 3–1 victory over the Braves. On September 20, 1954, he faced the Dodgers in a game that would clinch the pennant for the Giants if they prevailed. Despite a sore back, Maglie held them to one run in a complete game, 7–1 victory. The last out was a ground ball hit by Roy Campanella to the mound that Maglie tossed to first baseman Whitey Lockman; once the out was recorded, Lockman rushed to meet his pitcher and jumped in his arms in celebration. Even after throwing his no-hitter in 1956, Maglie still considered his September 20 start the best game he had ever pitched. Maglie finished the season with a 14–6 record and a 3.26 ERA in 34 games (32 starts). That season, Maglie, Johnny Antonelli, and Ruben Gomez combined to win 52 games, complete 37 starts, and help the Giants pitchers post an ERA of 3.09, the lowest in the National League. Maglie ranked among the league leaders in wins (14, tied with Gene Conley and Curt Simmons for ninth), winning percentage (.700, 6), ERA (3.26, eighth), and strikeouts (117, eighth). He finished 22nd in NL MVP voting.

Maglie started Game 1 of the 1954 World Series against the Cleveland Indians, allowing two runs in seven innings. After the first two batters of the eighth reached, Maglie was replaced with Don Liddle, who gave up the fly ball to Vic Wertz that Willie Mays caught in one of baseball's most storied plays. He got a no-decision as the Giants won the game in 10 innings on a pinch-hit home run by Dusty Rhodes. The Giants went on to sweep the Indians and claim the Word Series title.

In 1955, Maglie's back continued to bother him. He got off to a disappointing start to the year, losing all three of his April starts. On April 23, against the Dodgers at Ebbets Field, Maglie had been throwing brushback pitches past the heads of several Brooklyn hitters. In the fourth inning, Jackie Robinson dropped down a bunt, intending to retaliate for the knockdown pitch by crashing into Maglie as he fielded the ball. But Maglie did not come off the pitching mound and Robinson instead collided with Davey Williams, who was covering first base. Williams was knocked to the ground in pain and had to leave the game, and Alvin Dark attempted to fight Robinson. Both benches cleared, but umpire Tom Gorman kept Dark from doing anything more than yelling. Dark got revenge in the fifth by running hard into Robinson at third base. The two exchanged words again, but umpire Babe Pinelli kept things from getting out of hand. The Dodgers went on to win 3–1.

Following the game in Brooklyn, Maglie won eight decisions in a row, and nine out of ten through July 2. After July 2, though, he only once made it past the fifth inning and posted an 8.49 ERA in seven games, bothered some by the hot 1955 summer. He was placed on waivers in July and claimed by the Cleveland Indians on July 31.

=== Later years (1955–1958) ===
With the Indians, Maglie made a start on August 5 but gave up five runs (three earned) in two innings and took the loss in a 7–5 defeat by the Washington Senators. He made only one more start all year (also a loss), used mainly out of the bullpen and not making an appearance after September 8. In 23 games (21 starts) with the Giants in 1955, Maglie had a 9–5 record, a 3.75 ERA, 71 strikeouts, 48 walks, and 142 hits allowed in 129 2/3 innings. In 10 games (two starts) for the Indians, he had an 0–2 record, a 3.86 ERA, 11 strikeouts, seven walks, and 26 hits allowed in 25 2/3 innings. His combined totals with both teams were a 9–7 record, a 3.77 ERA, 82 strikeouts, 55 walks, and 168 hits allowed in 155 1/3 innings pitched.

Used sparingly by the Indians to begin the 1956 season, Maglie was purchased by the Brooklyn Dodgers on May 15, a "surprise" according to The New York Times. Maglie had pitched only two games for Cleveland all year, both in relief, and it seemed that his career was "all through," according to Robert Creamer of Sports Illustrated. Without a win since July 9 of the previous year, on June 4, he allowed only three hits against the Braves, whom the Dodgers were in a pennant race against. From that point on, he served as a starter the rest of the year for the Dodgers. In the first game of a doubleheader against the Cardinals on August 5, he allowed just four hits in a 7–0 shutout victory. He allowed just one hit to the Giants in Game 2 of a doubleheader on September 1 but had to leave the game with one out in the sixth after he threw his glove to the ground in disgust over Artie Gore calling four straight balls on Foster Castleman; throwing the glove to the ground out of anger results in an automatic ejection. Though he got a no-decision, the Dodgers triumphed 5–0. On September 25, he threw a no-hitter against the Phillies in a 5–0 Dodger triumph at Ebbets Field. He had a sterling comeback season for the Dodgers in 1956 (who won the NL pennant by one game over the Milwaukee Braves and two games over the Cincinnati Reds), going 13–5 with 2.89 ERA (2.87 not counting his two Cleveland appearances), 110 strikeouts, 54 walks, and 160 hits allowed in 196 innings pitched. His 2.87 ERA in the NL ranked fourth, behind Lew Burdette's 2.70, Spahn's 2.78, and Johnny Antonelli's 2.87. He finished second to teammate Don Newcombe in balloting for the first ever Cy Young Award, and was also second to Newcombe in MVP balloting.

Maglie was expected to be the Dodgers' Game 1 starter in the 1956 World Series on October 3, but an upset stomach and a stiff shoulder experienced a couple days before left his status in doubt. Ultimately, Maglie did make the start, allowing three runs in a complete game and outpitching future Hall of Famer Whitey Ford as the Dodgers beat the Yankees 6–3. Maglie said after the game: "This was my greatest thrill. Yes, even more of a thrill than my no-hitter. They claim you can't have everything you want in life, but believe me, with this series victory, I have close to all I ever wished for." Maglie appeared on the game show What's My Line? the night before he started Game 5 of the Series as one of the panel members, along with former Yankee Phil Rizzuto. He held the Yankees to two runs in another complete game effort in Game 5 but suffered the loss because Don Larsen threw a perfect game for the Yankees, who won the series in seven games. In recognition of Maglie's performance in 1956, the Chicago Chapter of the Baseball Writers Association honored him with the William Wrigley Jr. Award for "'comeback' of the year."

In an article released during 1957 spring training, Dodger manager Walter Alston previewed his team: "Sal Maglie showed me he makes up for his years with a wise head and strong arm. He's good for several more years yet." In his first start of the year, on April 18, he allowed just four hits and one unearned run in a 6–1 victory over the Pirates. Through May 30, he had a 3.16 ERA, but Maglie was inactive from that date until July 2, bothered by a sore thumb. In his July 2 return, he threw a four-hit shutout against the Giants. Over the next two months, he posted a 2.83 ERA. That August, the Dodgers placed Maglie on waivers hoping to trade him to the Yankees. The first time they put him on waivers, the Chicago White Sox claimed him, but the Dodgers withdrew him. The second time, the White Sox opted not to claim him, hoping instead to make a trade offer if he passed through waivers. No one did claim him, and the Yankees acquired him for $37,500 and two Triple-A players that the Dodgers could pick. However, since the trade was not finalized until September 1, Maglie was not eligible to pitch in the World Series for New York that year, as players acquired after the August 31 deadline were ineligible. Cheered during his first game at Yankee Stadium, Maglie tipped his hat to the crowd. He only made three starts for the Yankees but won two of them, including a game against the Indians on September 11 when he held Cleveland to three hits and outpitched future Hall of Famer Early Wynn in a 5–0 shutout victory. Though he was playing for the Yankees at the time, Maglie attended the final Giants game at the Polo Grounds, honored in pregame festivities on September 29, 1957. In 19 games (17 starts) for Brooklyn, he had a 6–6 record, a 2.93 ERA, 50 strikeouts, 26 walks, and 94 hits allowed in 101 1/3 innings pitched. With the Yankees in six games (three starts), he had a 2–0 record, a 1.73 ERA, nine strikeouts, seven walks, and 22 hits allowed in 26 innings pitched. His combined numbers between the two ballclubs were an 8–6 record, a 2.69 ERA, 59 strikeouts, 33 walks, and 116 hits allowed in 127 1/3 innings. Though he was ineligible for the 1957 World Series, Maglie attended the contests, sharing his observations with Creamer as the Braves defeated the Yankees in seven games.

A part of the Yankees roster in 1958, the 41-year-old Maglie was not used until May 18, the 23rd game of the year for New York, though there were no reports of this being due to injury. In the first game of a doubleheader against the Senators that day, he picked up the victory, allowing two runs over eight innings and hitting a three-run home run against Pedro Ramos in a 5–2 triumph. Maglie only made two more starts for the Yankees after that and posted a 4.63 ERA in his first seven games. On June 14, his contract was sold to the St. Louis Cardinals for just over $20,000.

With the Cardinals, Maglie joined the starting rotation and won his first two starts, allowing one run in seven innings against the Braves on June 22 and allowing one run in a complete game against the Phillies on June 28. After that, he never won a game again. He made his last major league appearance on August 31, allowing five runs (two earned) in three innings and taking the loss in an 8–5 defeat to the Cubs. In 10 starts with St. Louis, he had a 2–6 record, a 4.75 ERA, 21 strikeouts, 25 walks, and 46 hits allowed in 53 innings pitched. His combined totals between the Cardinals and Yankees were a 3–7 record, a 4.72 ERA, 28 strikeouts, 34 walks, and 73 hits allowed in 76 1/3 innings pitched. Maglie attempted to return to the Cardinals for the 1959 season, but the team handed him his unconditional release at the end of spring training.

== Legacy and career statistics ==
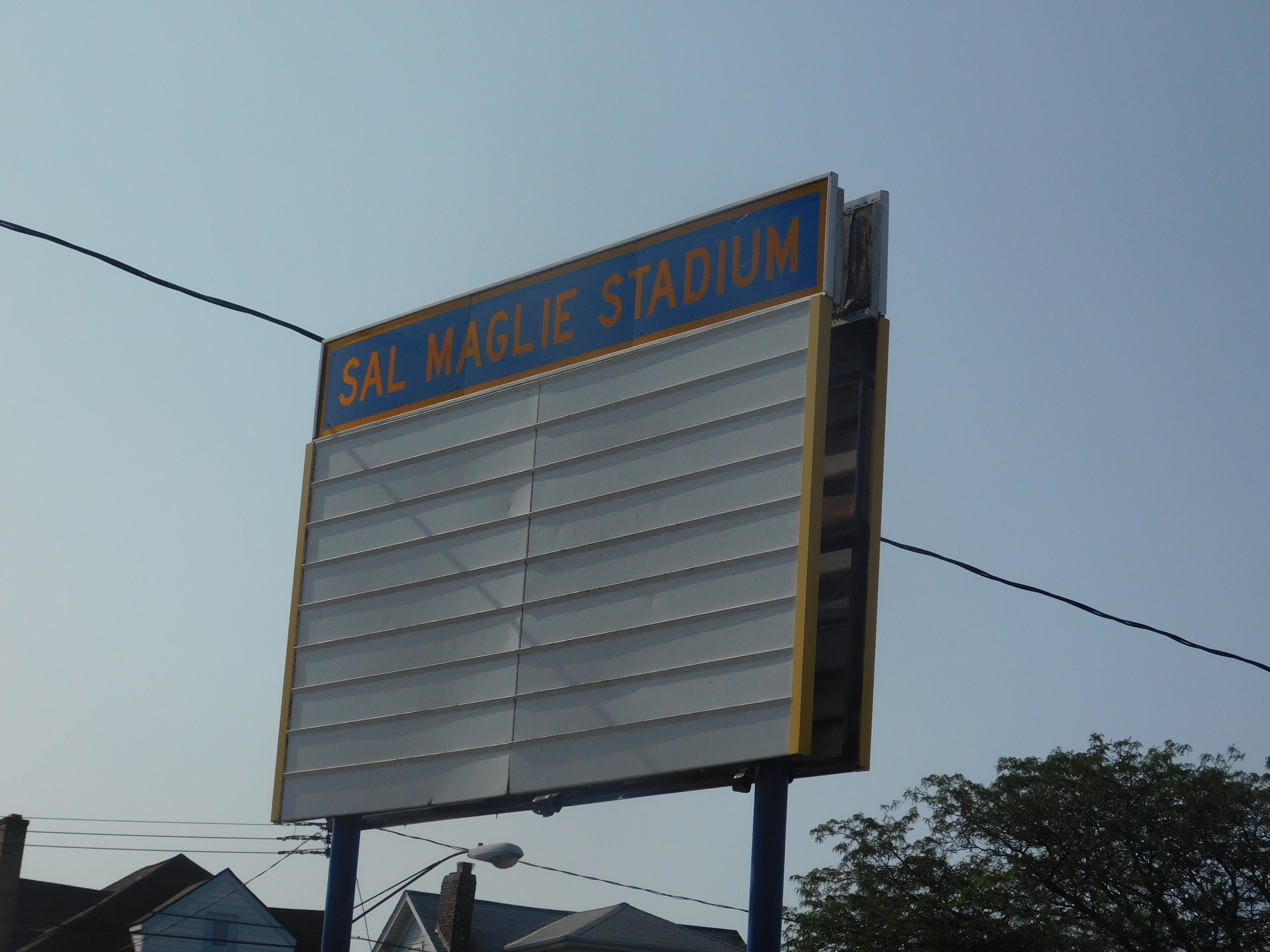
Sign from Sal Maglie Stadium in Maglie's hometown of Niagara Falls

Bill Madden, sportswriter for the New York Daily News, wrote that Maglie would never be a Hall of Famer unless "there’s a Hall of Fame just for pitchers whom you wanted to have the ball in a game you had to win." Maglie did appear on the Hall of Fame ballot in 1964 and 1968, but he never got more than 6.5% of the vote. In spite of a slow start in the minor leagues and the four years he was banned for pitching in the Mexican League, Maglie became "one of the most accomplished pitchers of his era," according to Joseph Durso of the New York Times. His .657 career winning percentage ranked 22nd among major leaguers as of August 2020, and he had a 23–11 record against the Dodgers, archrival of the Giants, including a streak at Ebbets Field where he won 11 of 12 decisions. From a sabermetric analysis, Maglie's 5.9 Wins Above Replacement (WAR) was the NL's 10th best, and he had a career WAR of 34.2, according to Baseball-Reference.com. In The New Bill James Historical Baseball Abstract (2001), sabermetrician Bill James ranks Maglie as the best pitcher in baseball for 1951 and says that Maglie probably would have won the Cy Young Award in 1951 had it been in existence at the time. During his 10-season career, Maglie pitched in three World Series (winning in 1954 with the Giants), and he was twice a member of the NL All-Star team. He was the last of 14 players to play for the Giants, Dodgers, and Yankees at a time when all three teams were in New York City.

During his time with the Giants, Maglie developed a rivalry with Dodger hitter Carl Furillo. Once, after surviving one of Maglie's close shave pitches, Furillo threw his bat at the pitcher. However, after Maglie was acquired by the Dodgers in 1956, the two became friends and even roommates at times. Hall of Fame pitcher Don Drysdale credited Maglie with teaching him the art of brushing back batters while the two were teammates in Brooklyn. Maglie had special advice for when Mays was batting. "You have to throw at him twice," he told Drysdale, observing that Mays would not expect a second brushback pitch.

Willie Mays told a story in his autobiography of hitting a home run against Maglie after Maglie went to the Dodgers. However, the only home run Maglie gave up to the Giants while wearing a Dodger uniform was to Ray Jablonski, not Mays.

In June 1983, Hyde Park Stadium in Niagara Falls was renamed Sal Maglie Stadium. The ceremony featured an extremely short baseball bus excursion, as a bus loaded with friends and family of Maglie left the Stadium Grill located about two hundred yards across the street and drove into Sal Maglie Stadium. As of August 2020, Sal Maglie Stadium is the home of the Niagara University Purple Eagles and the Niagara Power of the New York Collegiate Baseball League.

W	L	PCT	ERA	G	GS	CG	SHO	SV	IP	H	R	ER	HR	BB	SO	HBP	WP	BF	WHIP
119	62	.657	3.15	303	232	93	25	14	1723	1591	684	603	169	562	862	44	18	7182	1.250

== Coaching career ==
In September 1958, the Associated Press wrote that Maglie was a candidate to be St. Louis's pitching coach in 1959. Instead, the Cardinals hired him to scout and serve as a minor league coach. Not enjoying the arrangement, Maglie did not renew his contract for the 1960 season.

The Boston Red Sox hired Maglie to be their pitching coach before the 1960 season, and he served in that capacity for the next three years. Under his tutelage, Bill Monbouquette had 17 strikeouts in a game in 1961 and quoted Maglie after the feat. "Sal talked about stuff like ‘move this guy off the plate, move his feet, move his legs,’ and oh, he did preach: ‘throw that ball inside!’ And he didn't mean pitch to get a strike on the inside corner. He meant you've got to set that hitter up with a pitch way inside!" When Monbouquette and Earl Wilson threw no-hitters in 1962, they credited Maglie with their improvement. "He taught me how to use the lower part of my body," Dick Radatz said, crediting the advice with adding four or five miles an hour to his pitches' velocity. "I think he was a fine pitching coach. What he taught me helped me for the rest of my career. Without that, I don’t think I’d have been the pitcher I was." When Johnny Pesky replaced Pinky Higgins as Boston's manager after the 1962 season, Pesky chose not to bring back Maglie for 1963, preferring instead to pick new coaches.

Maglie did not initially pursue another coaching job because his wife, Kay, was diagnosed with cancer in 1963. He invested in local businesses around Niagara Falls, engaged in public speaking, and joined the New York State Athletic Commission (NYSAC) in 1965. The NYSAC post forced him to turn down an offer to return to the Red Sox in 1965, but he signed a two-year contract to become their pitching coach again in 1966. He was the pitching coach for the "Impossible Dream" Red Sox that went all the way to the 1967 World Series before losing in seven games to the Cardinals. Jim Lonborg, the AL Cy Young Award winner that season, credited his effectiveness that year to Maglie's lessons on pitching inside. The Red Sox later fired Maglie after losing the 1967 World Series, and Maglie criticized manager Dick Williams in an interview a week later. "Dick Williams gave me the biggest disappointment I ever got in baseball," Maglie said. "Williams never even had the courage or decency to tell me himself that I was fired...I don’t like being stepped on." Maglie also criticized Williams for his handling of Lonborg, who got the loss after Williams started him on two days' rest in Game 7 of the series. "It was obvious Lonborg didn't have it. Williams should have gotten him out sooner, and I told him so." Williams had wanted to choose his own pitching coach when he became Boston's manager in 1967, but he was unable to since Maglie was still under contract for one year.

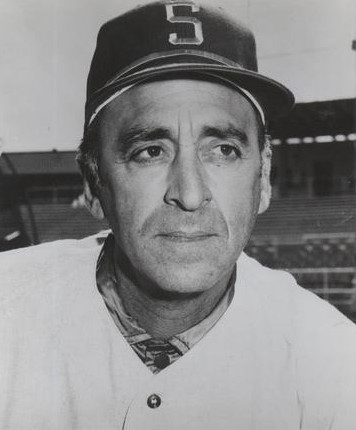
Maglie as pitching coach for the Seattle Pilots

Maglie was not unemployed long, as he was hired as a scout for the expansion Seattle Pilots in 1968. The franchise began play in 1969, and Maglie was their first pitching coach. He was profiled unflatteringly in Jim Bouton's book Ball Four, despite the fact that he was Bouton's boyhood hero. Bouton commented that Maglie rarely gave useful advice to the pitchers, and frequently second-guessed their choice of pitches, often contradicting his previous second guessing. In one such instance, Bouton related:

[Maglie] had quite an adventure tonight. Darrell Brandon pitching, and with Rod Carew on third base he's using a full wind-up. At the last moment he decides to take a look over at Carew, who's taking a pretty good lead. So he backs off the rubber and Sal yells at him, "For crissakes, get the hitter. The runner isn't going anyplace."

So Darrell winds up and lets fly. And Carew steals home.

When Darrell comes into the dugout at the end of the inning, Maglie lets him have it. "Dammit", he says. "You know you've got to pitch from the stretch in that situation."

Bouton and Maglie clashed over the knuckleball, which Bouton wanted to throw exclusively; Maglie preferred that he throw other pitches as well. The Pilots filed for bankruptcy after the season and moved to Milwaukee, where they became the Brewers; Maglie was not retained as the organization's pitching coach for 1970. He served as the general manager of his hometown Niagara Falls Pirates that season, his final baseball-related job.

== Description and pitching style ==
At 6 feet 2 inches (1.88 m) and 180 pounds (82 kg), Maglie maintained a "menacing" appearance on the mound, according to the New York Times. This was partly due to his five o'clock shadow look, accentuated by the fact that he never shaved before games. Bouton said of him in 1969, "He still looks like he'd knock down his grandmother. He's got those big evil-looking black eyes." Despite the intimidating appearance, the New York Times wrote that in person, he "had a gentle, polite manner with a voice as soft as that of a priest in a confessional."

However, there was nothing gentle about Maglie's pitching. His "Sal the Barber" nickname came from his propensity to give close shaves—that is, pitch inside to hitters. Another writer referred to him as "God's Gift to Gillette." Hirsch wrote that he had "a reputation for knocking hitters down." Willie Mays summarized his reason for throwing inside: "He always liked to be in complete control of a game, and the way he did this, or thought he had to do it, was by pitching batters close. You always had to worry about a brushback pitch from him. You knew he would throw it, but you didn't know how close he would make it." "You could catch Sal sitting in a rocking chair," said Wes Westrum, who caught him with the Giants. "Perfect control." The curveball was his specialty pitch. "Sal had three curveballs," Westrum said. "One acted like a slider. Another was a slow sweeping curve, almost a changeup. The third broke quickly." Maglie developed the curveball while pitching in the Mexican League. When throwing his fastball, he would grip the ball by the seams, with his fingers spread out. Before he threw, Maglie had a routine of, as he described it, "wiping my hand on my shirt, tugging at my cap, then licking my fingers, wiping my hand off again, rubbing it on my leg and then picking up the resin bag." He did this to get hitters fidgety and to relax himself before throwing. His habit of wiping his hands led, as Robert Creamer reported, to accusations that he threw a spitball.

In 1958, Maglie wrote an article about pitching for Sports Illustrated, where he listed three characteristics of a successful major league pitcher: "1) control, both of his pitches and of himself; 2) confidence and determination; [and] 3) knowledge and experience." By control, he meant the ability "to put the ball exactly where [the pitcher] wants it every time." By confidence and determination, he meant "the kind that keeps a pitcher going when everything says to him that he is beaten, the kind that just won't permit him to quit." By knowledge, he meant "deep inside knowledge" gained both through experience and "an awful lot of study and experimentation."

== Personal life ==
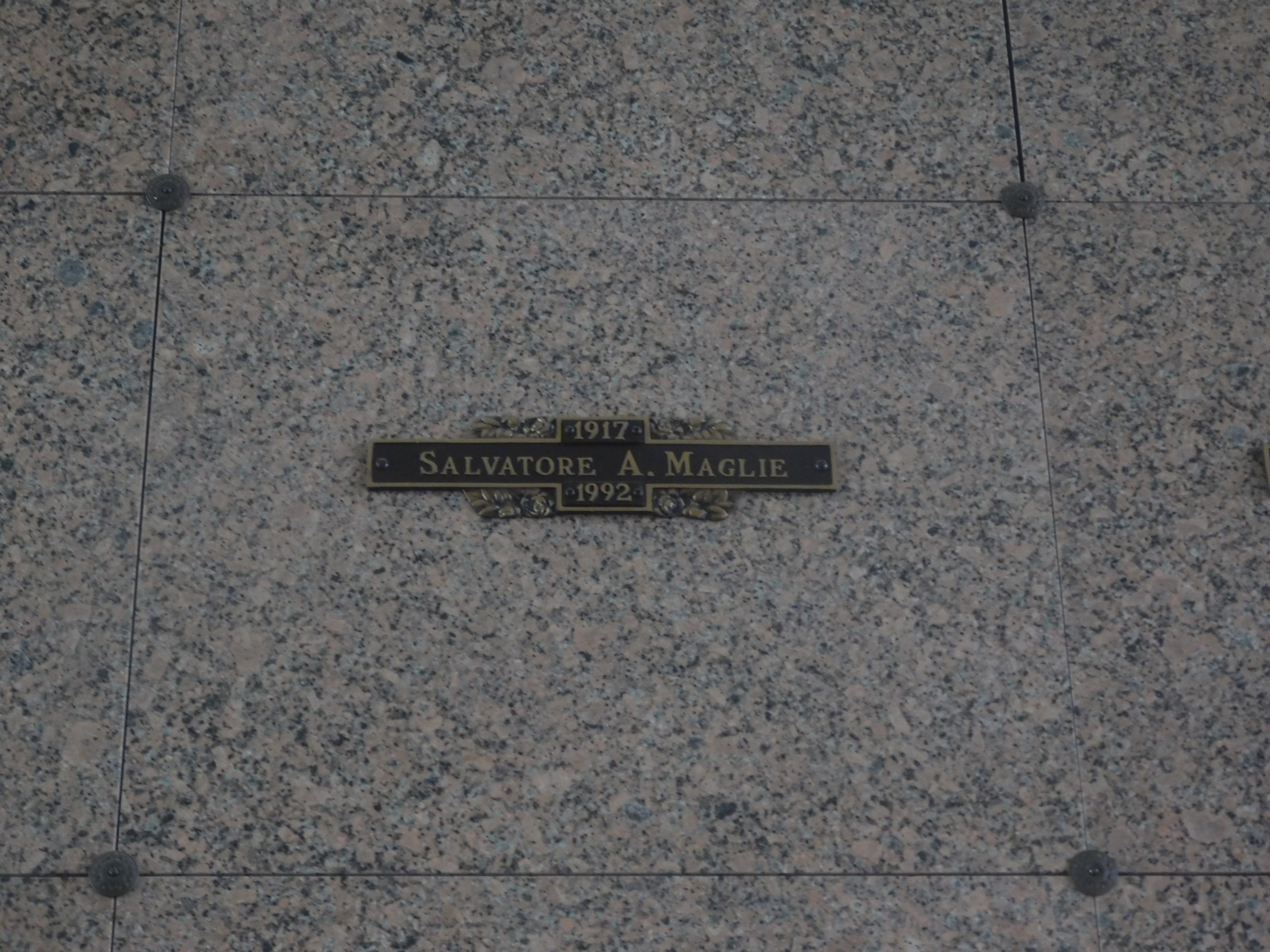
Maglie's grave at St. Joseph's Cemetery in Niagara Falls

In March 1941, Maglie eloped with Kay Pileggi, whom he had dated for a while; the couple was married in a Catholic ceremony in May of that year. They adopted a boy, Sal Jr., in 1955, and another son, Joseph, in 1963, after Sal Sr. had finished his first coaching stint with the Red Sox. Kay suffered a return of cancer that year (she had undergone surgery to treat it in 1958) and died four years later, in 1967. The pitcher remarried in 1971, to Doris, becoming the stepfather of her daughter Holly. During the 1950s, Maglie lived in Riverdale, The Bronx.

Maglie appeared as a special guest on the CBS television show, I've Got a Secret, on the September 22, 1954 episode.

During the 1970s, Maglie was employed by a wholesale liquor distributor as a salesman. Later in the decade, he worked for the Niagara Falls Convention Bureau as their membership coordinator. He retired in 1979. A lover of Italian food, Maglie's favorite restaurant in Niagara Falls was the Como Restaurant, where he was a frequent customer. Golf was a hobby of his in retirement, and he would sign autographs at card shows and pitch in old-timers' games. Joseph, his second son, was a member of the United States Air Force.

Following Maglie's first wife's death, his son, Sal Jr., struggled with drug addiction and depression. When the younger Sal died in 1985, his adoptive father's health suffered. Sal Sr. had recovered from a near-fatal brain aneurysm suffered in 1982, but following a 1987 stroke, he moved into the Niagara Falls Memorial Nursing Home. He lived for five more years before dying on December 28, 1992, due to bronchial pneumonia complications.

== See also ==
- List of Major League Baseball annual ERA leaders
- List of Major League Baseball annual wins leaders
- List of Major League Baseball no-hitters

== Bibliography ==
- Bouton, Jim (1970). Ball Four. New York: Wiley Publishing, Inc. ISBN 978-0440004158.
- Hirsch, James S. (2010). Willie Mays: The Life, the Legend. New York: Scribner. ISBN 978-1-4165-4790-7.
- James, Bill (2003). The New Bill James Historical Baseball Abstract. New York: Free Press. ISBN 978-0743227223.
- Mays, Willie; Sahadi, Lou (1988). Say Hey: The Autobiography of Willie Mays. New York: Simon and Schuster. ISBN 0671632922.

Achievements
Preceded by Mel Parnell	No-hitter pitcher September 25, 1956	Succeeded by Don Larsen
Sporting positions
Preceded by Dave Ferriss; Mace Brown	Boston Red Sox pitching coach 1960–1962; 1966–1967	Succeeded by Harry Dorish; Darrell Johnson
Preceded by Franchise established	Seattle Pilots pitching coach 1969	Succeeded by Wes Stock (Milwaukee Brewers)
