= Enos Slaughter =

American baseball player (1916–2002)

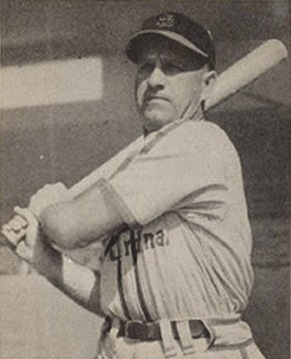
- Slaughter with the St. Louis Cardinals in 1948
- Right fielder
- Born: April 27, 1916; Roxboro, North Carolina, U.S.
- Died: August 12, 2002 (aged 86); Durham, North Carolina, U.S.
- Batted: Left Threw: Right

MLB debut
- April 19, 1938, for the St. Louis Cardinals

Last MLB appearance
- September 29, 1959, for the Milwaukee Braves

MLB statistics
- Batting average: .300
- Hits: 2,383
- Home runs: 169
- Runs batted in: 1,304
- Stats at Baseball Reference

Teams
- St. Louis Cardinals (1938–1942, 1946–1953); New York Yankees (1954–1955); Kansas City Athletics (1955–1956); New York Yankees (1956–1959); Milwaukee Braves (1959)

Career highlights and awards
- 10× All-Star (1941, 1942, 1946–1953); 4× World Series champion (1942, 1946, 1956, 1958); NL RBI leader (1946); St. Louis Cardinals No. 9 retired; St. Louis Cardinals Hall of Fame

Member of the National

Baseball Hall of Fame
- Induction: 1985
- Election method: Veterans Committee

Enos Bradsher Slaughter (April 27, 1916 – August 12, 2002), nicknamed "Country", was an American professional baseball right fielder. He played 19 seasons in Major League Baseball (MLB) for the St. Louis Cardinals, New York Yankees, Kansas City Athletics, and Milwaukee Braves from 1938 to 1959. He is best known for scoring the winning run in Game 7 of the 1946 World Series for the Cardinals. A ten-time All-Star, he has been elected to both the National Baseball Hall of Fame and St. Louis Cardinals Hall of Fame.

== Early life ==
Slaughter was born in Roxboro, North Carolina, where he earned the nickname "Country". In 1935, scout Billy Southworth signed him for the St. Louis Cardinals.

== Career ==
=== Minor leagues ===
The Martinsville Manufacturers were Slaughter's first professional team, in 1935. When Slaughter was a minor leaguer in Columbus, Georgia, he went running towards the dugout from his position in the outfield, slowed down near the infield, and began walking the rest of the way. Manager Eddie Dyer told him, "Son, if you're tired, we'll try to get you some help." During the remainder of his major-league career, Slaughter ran everywhere he went on a baseball field. In 1937, he had 245 hits and 147 runs scored for Columbus.

=== Major leagues ===
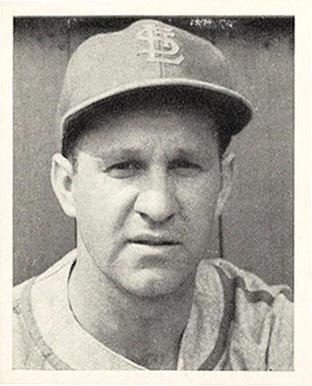
Slaughter with the Cardinals

Slaughter batted left-handed and threw right-handed. He was renowned for his smooth swing that made him a reliable "contact" hitter. Slaughter had 2,383 hits in his major league career, including 169 home runs, and 1,304 RBI in 2,380 games. Slaughter played 19 seasons with the St. Louis Cardinals, New York Yankees, Kansas City Athletics, and Milwaukee Braves. During that period, he was a ten-time All-Star and played in five World Series. His 1,820 games played ranks fifth in Cardinals' history behind Yadier Molina, Ozzie Smith, Lou Brock, and Stan Musial. He presently ranks third in RBI with 1,148; sixth in ABs with 6,775; and seventh in doubles with 366.

After debuting with the Cardinals in 1938, Slaughter became an everyday outfielder for them in 1939.

Slaughter served for three years in the Army Air Corps during World War II. He was a sergeant who taught physical education. Slaughter helped set up baseball teams in Tinian and Saipan, and their games inspired the troops while drawing upwards of 20,000 spectators. Immediately upon return from his military service in 1946, Slaughter led the National League with 130 RBI and led the Cardinals to a World Series win over the Boston Red Sox. In the decisive seventh game of that series, Slaughter, running with the pitch, made a famous "Mad Dash" for home from first base on Harry Walker's hit in the eighth inning, scoring the winning run that beat the throw of Johnny Pesky from the outfield. Walker's hit was ruled a double, although some observers felt it should have been ruled a single, with the throw home allowing Walker to advance to second base. This play was named No. 10 on the Sporting News list of Baseball's 25 Greatest Moments in 1999.

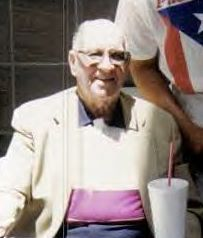
Slaughter in 1996 during his number 9 retirement ceremony

Slaughter was known for his hustle, especially for running hard to first base on walks, a habit later imitated by Pete Rose and David Eckstein.

Slaughter was reported at the time as being one of the leaders in racial taunting against the first black major league player, Jackie Robinson, and was accused of conspiring with teammate Terry Moore in an attempt to get the Cardinals to refuse to play Brooklyn with Robinson on the field. Sportswriter Bob Broeg, who covered the team at that time, refutes this claim and says that NL president Ford C. Frick considered the Cardinals fairer towards Robinson than any of the other teams. Slaughter later injured Robinson during a game by inflicting a seven-inch gash from his shoe spikes on Robinson's leg. Slaughter denied that he had any animosity towards Robinson, claiming that such allegations had been made against him because he was "a Southern boy", and that the injury suffered by Robinson had been typical of Slaughter's rough playing style. The August 21, 1947 edition of St. Louis Star and Times quoted Dodgers' second-baseman Eddie Stanky as saying, "Slaughter deliberately spiked Robinson. I always had the highest regard for Slaughter. He is one of the keenest competitors I know, and I admire him for it. But that was the first time he spiked someone deliberately. I've lost all my respect for him." In the Ken Burns Baseball documentary, it was claimed that Slaughter, despite easily being out, ran and jumped at Robinson, cutting his thigh open. Most other accounts state that the cut was on Robinson's calf, and it was non-intentional, that Slaughter's spike caught Robinson while he was trying to beat the throw to first and Robinson was just not able to pull his leg away in time.

With the Yankees, Slaughter did not play as much, but he excelled as a pinch hitter for the ballclub. He batted fifth and played in left field in Game 5 of the 1956 World Series in which teammate Don Larsen pitched the only perfect game in World Series history, a 2–0 Yankees win. At age 40, he was the oldest player for either team in the game.

== Post-MLB career ==
Slaughter retired from major league baseball in 1959. He was a player-manager for the Houston Buffs of the Texas League in 1960 and for Raleigh Capitals of the Carolina League in 1961. Slaughter coached baseball for Duke University from 1971 to 1977. He provided aid to causes such as the Duke Children's Classic, the Person County Museum of History, and Piedmont Community College.

== Personal life ==
Slaughter had five wives, each of whom he divorced. He had four daughters: Gaye, Patricia, Rhonda, and Sharon. Henry Slaughter, his cousin, was a well-known southern gospel musician. Slaughter also mentored Lou Brock when he joined the Cardinals.

== Death ==
Slaughter died at age 86 on August 12, 2002. He had battled non-Hodgkin lymphoma, and two weeks before his death, he had undergone colon surgery to fix torn stomach ulcers. He was buried at Allensville United Methodist Church in Person County, North Carolina.

== Personal honors ==
Enos Slaughter's number 9 was retired by the St. Louis Cardinals in 1996.

Slaughter was elected to the Baseball Hall of Fame in 1985.

His jersey number 9 was retired by the Cardinals on September 6, 1996.

The Cardinals dedicated a statue depicting his famous Mad Dash in 1999. Slaughter was a fixture at statue dedications at Busch Stadium II for other Cardinal Hall of Famers during the last years of his life.

In 2013, the Bob Feller Act of Valor Award honored Slaughter as one of 37 Baseball Hall of Fame members for his service in the United States Army Air Force during World War II.

In January, 2014, the Cardinals announced Slaughter among 22 former players and personnel to be inducted into the St. Louis Cardinals Hall of Fame and Museum for the inaugural class of 2014.

== See also ==
- List of Major League Baseball career hits leaders
- List of Major League Baseball career doubles leaders
- List of Major League Baseball career triples leaders
- List of Major League Baseball career runs scored leaders
- List of Major League Baseball career runs batted in leaders
- List of Major League Baseball annual runs batted in leaders
- List of Major League Baseball annual doubles leaders
- List of Major League Baseball annual triples leaders
