= Dale Mitchell (baseball) =

American baseball player (1921–1987)

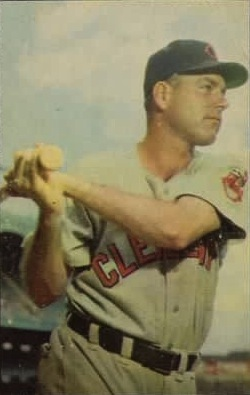
- Mitchell in about 1953
- Left fielder
- Born: August 23, 1921; Colony, Oklahoma, U.S.
- Died: January 5, 1987 (aged 65); Tulsa, Oklahoma, U.S.
- Batted: Left Threw: Left

MLB debut
- September 15, 1946, for the Cleveland Indians

Last MLB appearance
- September 26, 1956, for the Brooklyn Dodgers

MLB statistics
- Batting average: .312
- Home runs: 41
- Runs batted in: 403
- Stats at Baseball Reference

Teams
- Cleveland Indians (1946–1956); Brooklyn Dodgers (1956)

Career highlights and awards
- 2× All-Star (1949, 1952); World Series champion (1948); Cleveland Guardians Hall of Fame

Loren Dale Mitchell (August 23, 1921 – January 5, 1987) was an American professional baseball left fielder. He played 11 seasons in Major League Baseball (MLB) from 1946 to 1956 for the Cleveland Indians and Brooklyn Dodgers. A native of Colony, Oklahoma, he threw and batted left-handed, and was listed as 6 feet 1 inch (1.85 m) tall and 195 pounds (88 kg).

== Career ==
Mitchell was a standout at Cloud Chief High School, where he lettered in various sports besides baseball. While still a teenager, he agreed to a contract offered by Cleveland Indians' scout Hugh Alexander to sign with ballclub. However, an agreement to grant monthly payments until he graduated high school fell through when the front office reneged, leading to a long standoff where he elected to not report to the minors but also not negotiate with another team. As such, he applied to the University of Oklahoma in 1940. He played from 1942 to 1946 (while missing some time as he served in the Army Air Force during World War II) with a career batting average of .467 and a senior season average of .507. Both marks are still Sooner records. After graduation, seeking money to help out his family, he noticed that a minor league team that was affiliated with the Indians was playing in Oklahoma City in the Double-A Texas League. He explained his situation and was signed to play there in June of 1946. By September, he was in the major leagues.

Mainly a line drive hitter to all parts of the field, Mitchell hit .432 in 11 games for the Indians in his rookie season in 1946. He became a regular in 1947, and hit .300 or better six of the next seven seasons.

In 1948, Mitchell hit for a career-high .336 average, had 203 hits, led the league in singles (162), and led the Indians to victory in the 1948 World Series. He finished third in the 1948 American League batting race behind Ted Williams (.369) and Lou Boudreau (.355).

In 1949, Mitchell led the AL in hits (203), singles (161) and triples (23), struck out only 11 times in 640 at-bats, and made his first appearance in the All-Star Game. He received his second All-Star nod in 1952, and in 1954 led the Indians to an AL record 111 wins in a 154-game season and the American League pennant.

Mitchell posted a career .312 batting average, 41 home runs and 403 RBIs in 11 seasons in major league baseball. For the period between 1943 and 1960, only Williams and Stan Musial hit for higher averages. A good contact hitter, he struck out only 119 times in 3,984 at-bats and received 346 walks, for an outstanding 2.91 walk-to-strikeout ratio, the eighth best ratio in major league history. He compiled a .985 fielding percentage in the majors.

Mitchell played for the Cleveland Indians in all but 19 of the 1,127 regular-season games in which he appeared. Near the end of the 1956 season, the Brooklyn Dodgers purchased Mitchell's contract from Cleveland.

Mitchell made the final out in Don Larsen's perfect game during Game 5 of the 1956 World Series for the New York Yankees against Mitchell's new team, the Dodgers. Mitchell, pinch-hitting for Brooklyn pitcher Sal Maglie, took a called third strike to end the only perfect game in Series history. Mitchell always maintained that the third strike he took was really a ball. The Dodgers would go on to lose the series in seven games (with Mitchell appearing as a pinch hitter in Game 7), after which Mitchell retired from baseball. He then worked in oil, and then for the Martin Marietta Corporation as president of its cement division in Denver, all while maintaining farmland that he had purchased with the proceeds of making the World Series in 1948.

== Later life ==
Mitchell died from a heart attack in Tulsa, Oklahoma, on January 5, 1987 at the age of 65. The L. Dale Mitchell Baseball Park at the University of Oklahoma is named in his honor, one that he called the biggest of his life. Dale Berra, son of Yankee Legend Yogi Berra is named after Mitchell; Yogi Berra called Larsen's perfect game.

== See also ==
- List of Major League Baseball annual triples leaders
