= 1956 Major League Baseball season =

1956 MLB season
- League: American League (AL); National League (NL)
- Sport: Baseball
- Duration: Regular season: April 17 – September 30, 1956; World Series: October 3–10, 1956
- Games: 154
- Teams: 16 (8 per league)
- TV partner(s): NBC, CBS

Regular season
- Season MVP: AL: Mickey Mantle (NYY); NL: Don Newcombe (BRO)
- AL champions: New York Yankees
- AL runners-up: Cleveland Indians
- NL champions: Brooklyn Dodgers
- NL runners-up: Milwaukee Braves

World Series
- Champions: New York Yankees
- Runners-up: Brooklyn Dodgers
- World Series MVP: Don Larsen (NYY)

MLB seasons
- ← 1955 1957 →

Locations of teams for the 1955–1960 American League seasons
American League
Locations of teams for the 1953–1957 National League seasons
National League

The 1956 major league baseball season began on April 17, 1956. The regular season ended on September 30, with the Brooklyn Dodgers and New York Yankees as the regular season champions of the National League and American League, respectively. In a rematch of the previous season, the postseason began with Game 1 of the 53rd World Series on October 3 and ended with Game 7 on October 10. The series is notable for Yankees pitcher Don Larsen's perfect game in Game 5. In the seventh iteration of this Subway Series World Series matchup (and a rematch of the previous year), the Yankees defeated the Dodgers, four games to three, capturing their 17th championship in franchise history, since their previous in 1953. This would be the final Subway Series matchup between the two teams, as the next World Series between the two in 1963 would see a relocated Dodgers franchise in Los Angeles, California. Going into the season, the defending World Series champions were the Brooklyn Dodgers from the 1955 season.

The 23rd All-Star Game was held on July 10 at Griffith Stadium in Washington, D.C., home of the Washington Senators. The National League won, 7–3.

== Schedule ==
The 1956 schedule consisted of 154 games for all teams in the American League and National League, each of which had eight teams. Each team was scheduled to play 22 games against the other seven teams of their respective league. This continued the format put in place since the 1904 season (except for 1919) and would be used until 1961 in the American League and 1962 in the National League.

Opening Day took place on April 17, featuring all sixteen teams, the first time since 1954. The final day of the regular season was on September 30, which also saw all sixteen teams play, continuing the trend from the previous season. This was the first time since 1950 that all sixteen teams played their first and last games on the same days. The World Series took place between October 3 and October 10.

== Rule changes ==
The 1956 season saw the following rule changes:

- In an effort to speed up the pace of play, the American League limited the number of times a nonplayer (such as the manager or coaches) could visit the pitcher's mound to one, per each pitcher. A second visit would necessitate the removal of the pitcher.
- The National League required that batting helmets must be worn by all hitters.

== Teams ==
An asterisk (*) denotes the ballpark a team played the minority of their home games at

League	Team	City	Ballpark	Capacity	Manager
American League	Baltimore Orioles	Baltimore, Maryland	Baltimore Memorial Stadium	47,866	Paul Richards
American League	Boston Red Sox	Boston, Massachusetts	Fenway Park	34,824	Pinky Higgins
American League	Chicago White Sox	Chicago, Illinois	Comiskey Park	46,550	Marty Marion
American League	Cleveland Indians	Cleveland, Ohio	Cleveland Stadium	73,811	Al López
American League	Detroit Tigers	Detroit, Michigan	Briggs Stadium	58,000	Bucky Harris
American League	Kansas City Athletics	Kansas City, Missouri	Municipal Stadium	30,296	Lou Boudreau
American League	New York Yankees	New York, New York	Yankee Stadium	67,000	Casey Stengel
American League	Washington Senators	Washington, D.C.	Griffith Stadium	29,023	Chuck Dressen
National League	Brooklyn Dodgers	New York, New York	Ebbets Field	31,902	Walter Alston
National League	Brooklyn Dodgers	Jersey City, New Jersey	Roosevelt Stadium*	24,167*	Walter Alston
National League	Chicago Cubs	Chicago, Illinois	Wrigley Field	36,755	Stan Hack
National League	Cincinnati Redlegs	Cincinnati, Ohio	Crosley Field	29,584	Birdie Tebbetts
National League	Milwaukee Braves	Milwaukee, Wisconsin	Milwaukee County Stadium	43,117	Charlie Grimm
National League	Milwaukee Braves	Milwaukee, Wisconsin	Milwaukee County Stadium	43,117	Fred Haney
National League	New York Giants	New York, New York	Polo Grounds	54,500	Bill Rigney
National League	Philadelphia Phillies	Philadelphia, Pennsylvania	Connie Mack Stadium	33,359	Mayo Smith
National League	Pittsburgh Pirates	Pittsburgh, Pennsylvania	Forbes Field	34,249	Bobby Bragan
National League	St. Louis Cardinals	St. Louis, Missouri	Busch Stadium	30,500	Fred Hutchinson

== Standings ==
=== American League ===
American League
Team	W	L	Pct.	GB	Home	Road
New York Yankees	97	57	.630	—	49‍–‍28	48‍–‍29
Cleveland Indians	88	66	.571	9	46‍–‍31	42‍–‍35
Chicago White Sox	85	69	.552	12	46‍–‍31	39‍–‍38
Boston Red Sox	84	70	.545	13	43‍–‍34	41‍–‍36
Detroit Tigers	82	72	.532	15	37‍–‍40	45‍–‍32
Baltimore Orioles	69	85	.448	28	41‍–‍36	28‍–‍49
Washington Senators	59	95	.383	38	32‍–‍45	27‍–‍50
Kansas City Athletics	52	102	.338	45	22‍–‍55	30‍–‍47

=== National League ===
National League
Team	W	L	Pct.	GB	Home	Road
Brooklyn Dodgers	93	61	.604	—	52‍–‍25	41‍–‍36
Milwaukee Braves	92	62	.597	1	47‍–‍29	45‍–‍33
Cincinnati Redlegs	91	63	.591	2	51‍–‍26	40‍–‍37
St. Louis Cardinals	76	78	.494	17	43‍–‍34	33‍–‍44
Philadelphia Phillies	71	83	.461	22	40‍–‍37	31‍–‍46
New York Giants	67	87	.435	26	37‍–‍40	30‍–‍47
Pittsburgh Pirates	66	88	.429	27	35‍–‍43	31‍–‍45
Chicago Cubs	60	94	.390	33	39‍–‍38	21‍–‍56

=== Tie games ===
7 tie games (2 in AL, 5 in NL), which are not factored into winning percentage or games behind (and were often replayed again) occurred throughout the season.

==== American League ====
The Boston Red Sox, Cleveland Indians, Detroit Tigers, and Washington Senators had one tie game each.

- June 13, Cleveland Indians vs. Boston Red Sox, tied at 8 after 11 innings following a 33 minute rain delay.
- June 26, Washington Senators vs. Detroit Tigers, tied at 2 after a shortened game of five innings due to rain. Game was also protested by the Tigers, but disallowed.

==== National League ====
The Chicago Cubs and Pittsburgh Pirates had three tie games each. The St. Louis Cardinals had two tie games. The Cincinnati Redlegs and Milwaukee Braves had one tie game each.

- April 22, Cincinnati Redlegs vs. Chicago Cubs, tied at 1 after a shortened game of seven innings on account of darkness.
- May 6 (game 2), Pittsburgh Pirates vs. Chicago Cubs, tied at 6 after a shortened game of seven innings on account of darkness.
- July 18, Pittsburgh Pirates vs. St. Louis Cardinals, tied at 1 after nine innings due to rain. Pirate Vern Law had struck out in the 10th but this was negated, as well as Cardinal Hal R. Smith's entry at catcher.
- August 12, St. Louis Cardinals vs. Chicago Cubs, scoreless tie after nine innings on account of darkness. Game was made up on September 25.
- August 30, Pittsburgh Pirates vs. Milwaukee Braves, tied at 1 after a walk and a flyout in the top of the 9th inning due to rain.

== Postseason ==
The postseason began on October 3 and ended on October 10 with the New York Yankees defeating the Brooklyn Dodgers in the 1956 World Series in seven games.

=== Bracket ===
World Series
AL	New York Yankees	4
NL	Brooklyn Dodgers	3

== Managerial changes ==
=== Off-season ===
Team	Former Manager	New Manager
New York Giants	Leo Durocher	Bill Rigney
Pittsburgh Pirates	Fred Haney	Bobby Bragan
St. Louis Cardinals	Harry Walker	Fred Hutchinson

=== In-season ===
Team	Former Manager	New Manager
Milwaukee Braves	Charlie Grimm	Fred Haney

== League leaders ==
=== American League ===
Hitting leaders
Stat	Player	Total
AVG	Mickey Mantle^{1} (NYY)	.353
OPS	Mickey Mantle (NYY)	1.169
HR	Mickey Mantle^{1} (NYY)	52
RBI	Mickey Mantle^{1} (NYY)	130
R	Mickey Mantle (NYY)	132
H	Harvey Kuenn (DET)	196
SB	Luis Aparicio (CWS)	21

^{1} Major League Triple Crown batting winner

Pitching leaders
Stat	Player	Total
W	Frank Lary (DET)	21
L	Art Ditmar (KCA)	22
ERA	Whitey Ford (NYY)	2.47
K	Herb Score (CLE)	263
IP	Frank Lary (DET)	294.0
SV	George Zuverink (BAL)	16
WHIP	Dick Donovan (CWS)	1.155

=== National League ===
Hitting leaders
Stat	Player	Total
AVG	Hank Aaron (MIL)	.328
OPS	Duke Snider (BRO)	.997
HR	Duke Snider (BRO)	43
RBI	Stan Musial (STL)	109
R	Frank Robinson (CIN)	122
H	Hank Aaron (MIL)	200
SB	Willie Mays (NYG)	40

Pitching leaders
Stat	Player	Total
W	Don Newcombe (BRO)	27
L	Ron Kline (PIT); Robin Roberts (PHI)	18
ERA	Lew Burdette (MIL)	2.70
K	Sam Jones (CHC)	176
IP	Bob Friend (PIT)	314.1
SV	Clem Labine (BRO)	19
WHIP	Don Newcombe (BRO)	0.989

== Milestones ==
=== Batters ===
- Mickey Mantle (NYY):
  - Won the Major League Triple Crown by leading both leagues in batting average (.353), home runs (52), and runs batted in (130).
- Dale Long (PIT):
  - Set a Major League record by hitting home runs in eight consecutive games between May 19 and 28.
- Ted Williams (BOS):
  - Became the fifth player in Major League history to hit 400 home runs in the sixth inning against the Kansas City Athletics in game two of a doubleheader on July 17.

=== Pitchers ===
==== Perfect games ====
- Don Larsen (NYY)
  - Pitched the sixth perfect game in major league history and the first in franchise history on October 8, in Game 5 of the 1956 World Series against the Brooklyn Dodgers. It remains the only perfect game in World Series history. Larsen threw 97 pitches, 71 for strikes, and struck out seven in the 2–0 victory.

==== No-hitters ====
- Carl Erskine (BRO):
  - Erskine threw his second career no-hitter and the 12th no-hitter in franchise history, by defeating the New York Giants 3–0 on May 12. He walked two and struck out three, throwing 66 strikes on 102 pitches.
- Mel Parnell (BOS):
  - Parnell threw his first career no-hitter and the 11th no-hitter in franchise history, by defeating the Chicago White Sox 4–0 on July 14. Parnell walked two and struck out four.
- Sal Maglie (BRO/CLE):
  - Maglie threw his first career no-hitter and the 13th no-hitter in franchise history as a member of the Brooklyn Dodgers, by defeating the Philadelphia Phillies 5–0 on September 25. Maglie walked two and struck out three, throwing 71 strikes on 110 pitches.

==== Other pitching accomplishments ====
- Jack Harshman (CWS) / Connie Johnson (BAL):
  - The White Sox defeat the Orioles 1–0 at Comiskey Park in a game in which both pitchers throw matching one-hitters on June 21. This game was only the third double one-hitter thrown in the modern era (since 1901).

=== Miscellaneous ===
- Ed Rommel:
  - Was the first umpire to wear glasses in a Major League game on April 18. The game was played between the New York Yankees and the Washington Senators.
- New York Yankees:
  - Set a Major League record by leaving 20 players on base on September 21 against the Boston Red Sox at Fenway Park.

== Awards and honors ==
=== Regular season ===
Baseball Writers' Association of America Awards
BBWAA Award	National League	American League
Rookie of the Year	Frank Robinson (CIN)	Luis Aparicio (CWS)
Cy Young Award	—	Don Newcombe (BRO)
Most Valuable Player	Don Newcombe (BRO)	Mickey Mantle (NYY)
Babe Ruth Award (World Series MVP)	—	Don Larsen (NYY)

=== Other awards ===
- Sport Magazine's World Series Most Valuable Player Award: Don Larsen (NYY)

The Sporting News Awards
Award	National League	American League
Player of the Year	—	Mickey Mantle (NYY)
Pitcher of the Year	Don Newcombe (BRO)	Billy Pierce (CWS)
Rookie of the Year	Frank Robinson (CIN)	Luis Aparicio (CWS)
Manager of the Year	Birdie Tebbetts (CIN)	—
Executive of the Year	Gabe Paul (CIN)	—

=== Baseball Hall of Fame ===
- Hank Greenberg
- Joe Cronin

== Home field attendance ==
Team name	Wins	%±	Home attendance	%±	Per game
Milwaukee Braves	92	8.2%	2,046,331	2.0%	26,576
New York Yankees	97	1.0%	1,491,784	0.1%	19,374
Brooklyn Dodgers	93	−5.1%	1,213,562	17.4%	15,761
Boston Red Sox	84	0.0%	1,137,158	−5.5%	14,579
Cincinnati Redlegs	91	21.3%	1,125,928	62.3%	14,622
Detroit Tigers	82	3.8%	1,051,182	−11.1%	13,477
St. Louis Cardinals	76	11.8%	1,029,773	21.3%	13,202
Kansas City Athletics	52	−17.5%	1,015,154	−27.1%	13,184
Chicago White Sox	85	−6.6%	1,000,090	−14.9%	12,988
Pittsburgh Pirates	66	10.0%	949,878	102.4%	12,178
Philadelphia Phillies	71	−7.8%	934,798	1.3%	12,140
Baltimore Orioles	69	21.1%	901,201	5.8%	11,704
Cleveland Indians	88	−5.4%	865,467	−29.2%	11,240
Chicago Cubs	60	−16.7%	720,118	−17.8%	9,001
New York Giants	67	−16.3%	629,179	−23.7%	8,171
Washington Senators	59	11.3%	431,647	1.5%	5,606

== Venues ==
The Brooklyn Dodgers began playing several home games in Jersey City, New Jersey, playing seven games on April 19, May 16, June 25, July 25, 31, August 7 and 15.

== Media ==
=== Television ===
CBS aired the Saturday Game of the Week for the second consecutive year. The All-Star Game and World Series aired on NBC.

== Retired numbers ==
- Bob Feller had his No. 19 retired by the Cleveland Indians on December 28. This was the first number retired by the team.

== See also ==
- 1956 in baseball (Events, Births, Deaths)
- 1956 Nippon Professional Baseball season
