= 1956 World Series =

1956 Major League Baseball championship series

Team (Wins)	Managers	Season
New York Yankees (4)	Casey Stengel	97–57, .630, GA: 9
Brooklyn Dodgers (3)	Walter Alston	93–61, .604, GA: 1
- Dates: October 3–10
- Venue(s): Ebbets Field (Brooklyn); Yankee Stadium (New York)
- MVP: Don Larsen (New York)
- Umpires: Babe Pinelli (NL), Hank Soar (AL), Dusty Boggess (NL), Larry Napp (AL), Tom Gorman (NL: outfield only), Ed Runge (AL: outfield only)
- Hall of Famers: Yankees: Casey Stengel (manager); Yogi Berra; Whitey Ford; Mickey Mantle; Enos Slaughter; Dodgers: Walt Alston (manager); Roy Campanella; Don Drysdale; Gil Hodges; Sandy Koufax (DNP); Pee Wee Reese; Jackie Robinson; Duke Snider

Broadcast
- Television: NBC
- TV announcers: Vin Scully and Mel Allen
- Radio: Mutual
- Radio announcers: Bob Wolff and Bob Neal

The 1956 World Series was the championship series of Major League Baseball's (MLB) 1956 season. The 53rd edition of the World Series, it was a best-of-seven playoff that matched the American League (AL) champion New York Yankees against the National League (NL) champion and defending World Series champion Brooklyn Dodgers. A rematch of the 1955 series, it was also the last World Series between two teams from the same state until 1974, the last between two teams from the same metropolitan area until 1989, and the final Subway Series until 2000, as the Dodgers and the New York Giants moved to California following the 1957 season.

The Yankees won the series in seven games, capturing their 17th championship. Brooklyn won Games 1 and 2, but New York pitchers threw five consecutive complete games (Games 3–7) to cap off the comeback. The highlight was Don Larsen's perfect game in Game 5, during which he struck out seven batters. Despite his shaky start in Game 2, in which he allowed four unearned runs off one hit, Larsen was named the Series MVP for his perfect game. The Dodgers scored 19 runs in the first two games, but only six in the remaining five games, with just one in the final three games.

This was the last World Series to date not to have scheduled off days (although Game 2 was postponed a day due to rain).

As of March 2020, four original television broadcasts from this series (Game 2 partial, Games 3 and 5 complete, Game 7 partial) had been released on DVD.

== Summary ==
AL New York Yankees (4) vs. NL Brooklyn Dodgers (3)

Game	Date	Score	Location	Time	Attendance
1	October 3	New York Yankees – 3, Brooklyn Dodgers – 6	Ebbets Field	2:32	34,479
2	October 5†	New York Yankees – 8, Brooklyn Dodgers – 13	Ebbets Field	3:26	36,217
3	October 6	Brooklyn Dodgers – 3, New York Yankees – 5	Yankee Stadium	2:17	73,977
4	October 7	Brooklyn Dodgers – 2, New York Yankees – 6	Yankee Stadium	2:43	69,705
5	October 8	Brooklyn Dodgers – 0, New York Yankees – 2	Yankee Stadium	2:06	64,519
6	October 9	New York Yankees – 0, Brooklyn Dodgers – 1 (10)	Ebbets Field	2:37	33,224
7	October 10	New York Yankees – 9, Brooklyn Dodgers – 0	Ebbets Field	2:19	33,782

†: postponed from October 4 due to rain

== Matchups ==
=== Game 1 ===
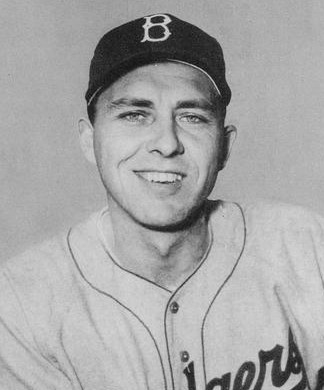
Gil Hodges

October 3, 1956 1:00 pm (ET) at Ebbets Field in Brooklyn, New York
Team	1	2	3	4	5	6	7	8	9	R	H	E
New York	2	0	0	1	0	0	0	0	0	3	9	1
Brooklyn	0	2	3	1	0	0	0	0	X	6	9	0
WP: Sal Maglie (1–0) LP: Whitey Ford (0–1); Home runs: NYY: Mickey Mantle (1), Billy Martin (1); BRO: Jackie Robinson (1), Gil Hodges (1)

Three batters into the game, the Yankees led 2–0 on a Mickey Mantle home run. Brooklyn struck back with a Jackie Robinson homer in the second inning and a three-run Gil Hodges shot in the third, then won behind Sal Maglie's complete game.

=== Game 2 ===
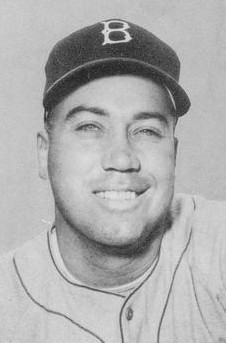
Duke Snider

October 5, 1956 1:00 pm (ET) at Ebbets Field in Brooklyn, New York
Team	1	2	3	4	5	6	7	8	9	R	H	E
New York	1	5	0	1	0	0	0	0	1	8	12	2
Brooklyn	0	6	1	2	2	0	0	2	X	13	12	0
WP: Don Bessent (1–0) LP: Tom Morgan (0–1); Home runs: NYY: Yogi Berra (1); BRO: Duke Snider (1)

Neither starting pitcher survived the second inning, Don Newcombe giving up a Yogi Berra grand slam, and Don Larsen giving up four unearned runs. Little-known pitcher Don Bessent worked the final seven innings for the win.

Game 2 set a number of peculiar records in World Series history, which are either matched or comparable with similar World Series records and performances, in limited instances:

- Game 2 is the first of three World Series games in history in which a grand slam-hitting team failed to win the game. The 1988 Oakland Athletics would produce a grand slam in Game 1, lose that game, and furthermore lose that series. The 2021 Atlanta Braves benefited from a first-inning grand slam in Game 5 but lost the game; the Braves recovered to clinch the series in six games.
- The number of Yankee runs put up in the game, eight, is the largest number of runs accumulated in a World Series game, by a team which lost the game, yet went on to win the series. This record is shared in common only with Game 3 of 1947, also a Yankee/Dodgers series.
- The combined run count of both teams in the game (21) was the most since Game 2 of the 1936 Series, in which the Yankees and Giants combined for 22. Both were not eclipsed until Game 4 of the 1993 Series.

=== Game 3 ===
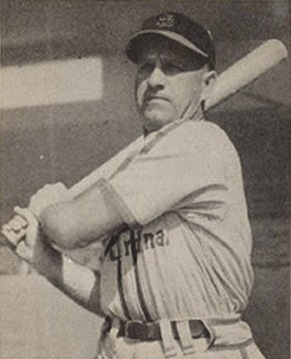
Enos Slaughter

October 6, 1956 1:00 pm (ET) at Yankee Stadium in Bronx, New York
Team	1	2	3	4	5	6	7	8	9	R	H	E
Brooklyn	0	1	0	0	0	1	1	0	0	3	8	1
New York	0	1	0	0	0	3	0	1	X	5	8	1
WP: Whitey Ford (1–1) LP: Roger Craig (0–1); Home runs: BRO: None; NYY: Billy Martin (2), Enos Slaughter (1)

Whitey Ford pitched a complete game, scattering eight hits, and got the support he needed from an Enos Slaughter three-run homer in the sixth that gave the Yankees a 4–2 lead; they never trailed in the game afterwards.

=== Game 4 ===
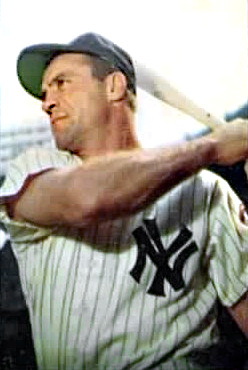
Hank Bauer

October 7, 1956 2:00 pm (ET) at Yankee Stadium in Bronx, New York
Team	1	2	3	4	5	6	7	8	9	R	H	E
Brooklyn	0	0	0	1	0	0	0	0	1	2	6	0
New York	1	0	0	2	0	1	2	0	X	6	7	2
WP: Tom Sturdivant (1–0) LP: Carl Erskine (0–1); Home runs: BRO: None; NYY: Mickey Mantle (2), Hank Bauer (1)

Hank Bauer's two-run homer in the seventh off Don Drysdale, pitching in relief, put the game away for the Yankees, who got a complete-game six-hitter from Tom Sturdivant. Mantle hit a home run off Ed Roebuck in the previous inning.

=== Game 5 ===
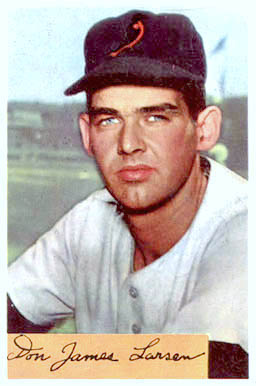
Don Larsen

October 8, 1956 1:00 pm (ET) at Yankee Stadium in Bronx, New York
Team	1	2	3	4	5	6	7	8	9	R	H	E
Brooklyn	0	0	0	0	0	0	0	0	0	0	0	0
New York	0	0	0	1	0	1	0	0	X	2	5	0
WP: Don Larsen (1–0) LP: Sal Maglie (1–1); Home runs: BRO: None; NYY: Mickey Mantle (3)

In Game 5, Don Larsen, displaying an unusual "no-windup" style and "working the curveball beautifully", pitched the first postseason perfect game (a mark that would be matched in the 2007 Japan Series Game 5, in an era of globalisation of baseball by the World Baseball Softball Confederation), and the only World Series no-hitter until 2022. While striking out seven Dodgers, Larsen had only one at-bat reach a three-ball count (against Pee Wee Reese, in the first inning).

Of several close moments, the best remembered is Gil Hodges' fifth-inning line drive toward Yankee Stadium's famed "Death Valley" in left-center, snared by center fielder Mickey Mantle with a spectacular running catch. In addition to that, Yankees fielders had to record three more lineouts, and shortstop Gil McDougald had to make a play on a ball that caromed off third baseman Andy Carey’s glove.

Brooklyn's Sal Maglie gave up only two runs on five hits and was perfect himself until a fourth-inning home run by Mantle broke the scoreless tie. The Yankees added an insurance run in the sixth as Hank Bauer's single scored Carey, who had opened the inning with a single and was sacrificed to second by Larsen.

The final out of the game came on a called third strike against Dale Mitchell and generated one of the most iconic images in sports history, when catcher Yogi Berra leaped into Larsen's arms.

When a reporter asked Yankees manager Casey Stengel afterward if this was the best game Larsen had ever pitched, Stengel diplomatically answered, "So far!" For Larsen, it was an especially satisfying performance, as he had acquired perhaps a better reputation as a night owl than as a pitcher. Stengel once said of Larsen, "The only thing he fears is sleep!" Larsen's perfect game was also the last game that umpire Babe Pinelli called behind the plate.

Sports cartoonist Willard Mullin drew an illustration of a happy Larsen painting a canvas titled The Master Piece, observed by a group of fawning art critics and Mullin's classic "Brooklyn Bum". Referencing the old saw "I don't know much about art, but I know what I like", the disgusted-looking Bum came up with a variation: "It may be art...but I don't like it!"

Brooklyn starter Sal Maglie appeared on the game show What's My Line? the night before the game, with former Yankee Phil Rizzuto as one of the panel members.

=== Game 6 ===
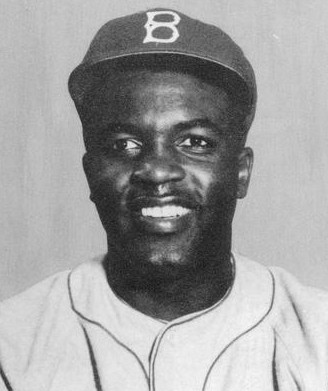
Jackie Robinson

October 9, 1956 1:00 pm (ET) at Ebbets Field in Brooklyn, New York
Team	1	2	3	4	5	6	7	8	9	10	R	H	E
New York	0	0	0	0	0	0	0	0	0	0	0	7	0
Brooklyn	0	0	0	0	0	0	0	0	0	1	1	4	0
WP: Clem Labine (1–0) LP: Bob Turley (0–1)

In a 10-inning scoreless pitching duel with both starters going all the way, Jackie Robinson's walk-off single to left in the bottom of the 10th won the game for Clem Labine and kept the Dodgers' championship hopes alive. Tough-luck loser Bob Turley gave up a 10th-inning walk to Jim Gilliam, a sacrifice bunt by Pee Wee Reese and intentional pass to Duke Snider before the decisive hit. Game 6 is one of only three games in World Series history to be scoreless through nine innings, the others being Game 2 in 1913 and Game 7 in 1991.

=== Game 7 ===
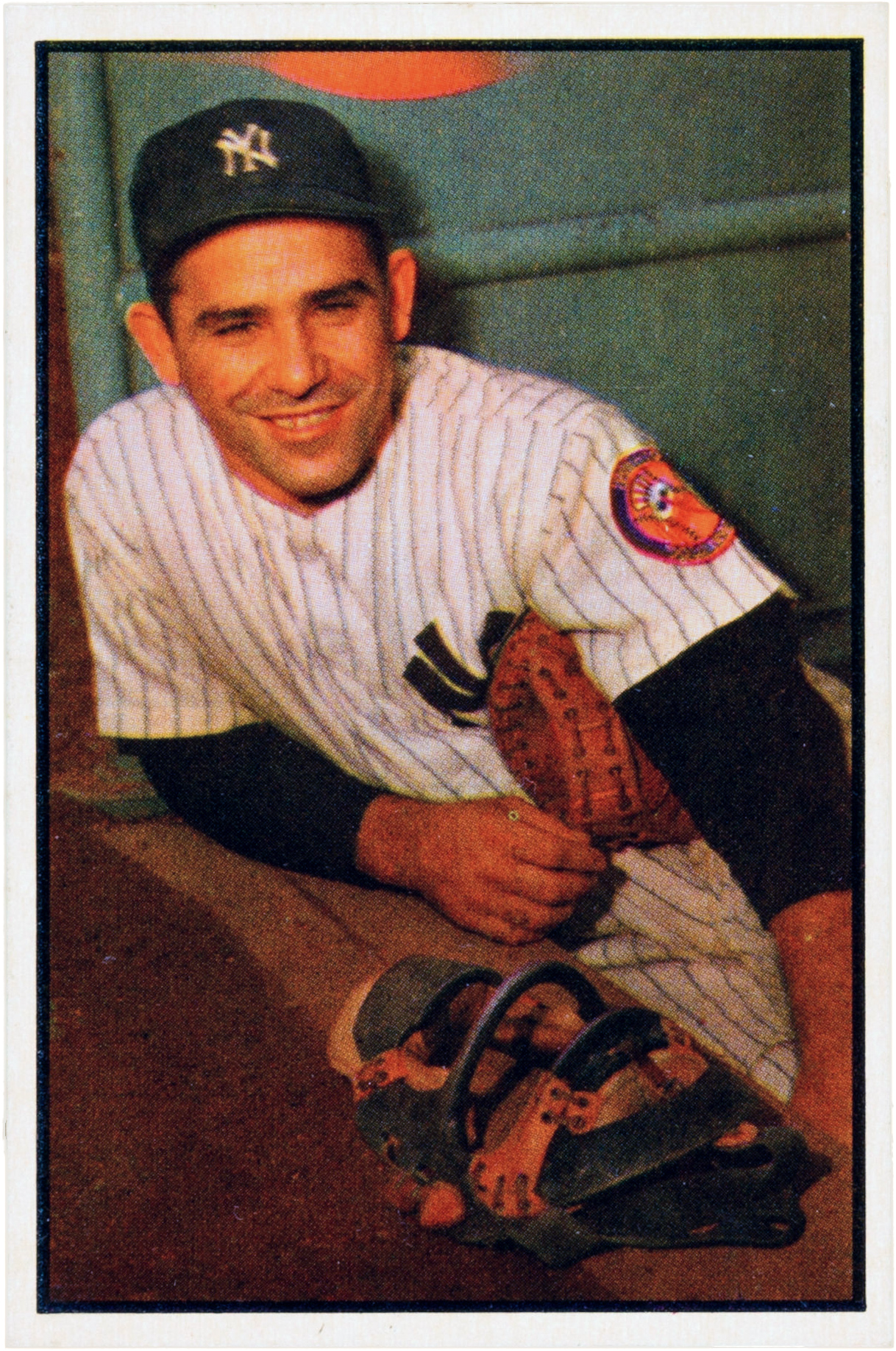
Yogi Berra

October 10, 1956 1:00 pm (ET) at Ebbets Field in Brooklyn, New York
Team	1	2	3	4	5	6	7	8	9	R	H	E
New York	2	0	2	1	0	0	4	0	0	9	10	0
Brooklyn	0	0	0	0	0	0	0	0	0	0	3	1
WP: Johnny Kucks (1–0) LP: Don Newcombe (0–1); Home runs: NYY: Yogi Berra 2 (3), Elston Howard (1), Bill Skowron (1); BRO: None

Yogi Berra's two homers led New York to an unexpectedly easy 9–0 title-clinching victory. Yankee pitcher Johnny Kucks struck out Jackie Robinson to end the Series. It would be Robinson's final at-bat, as he retired at the season's end.

After belting the Yankee pitching staff for 19 runs and 21 hits in the first two games, the Dodger bats went silent in the next five games, scoring only six runs on 21 hits, batting only .142 (21–for–148). New York outscored Brooklyn 22–6 in Games 3–7, the Yankees winning their 17th World Series.

== Composite line score ==
1956 World Series (4–3): New York Yankees (A.L.) over Brooklyn Dodgers (N.L.)

Team	1	2	3	4	5	6	7	8	9	10	R	H	E
New York Yankees	6	6	2	6	0	5	6	1	1	0	33	58	6
Brooklyn Dodgers	0	9	4	4	2	1	1	2	1	1	25	42	2
Total attendance: 345,903 Average attendance: 49,415; Winning player's share: $8,715 Losing player's share: $6,934

== Broadcasting ==
NBC televised the Series, with announcers Mel Allen (for the Yankees) and Vin Scully (for the Dodgers). In 2006, it was announced that a nearly-complete kinescope recording of the Game 5 telecast (featuring Larsen's perfect game) had been discovered by a collector. That kinescope recording aired during the MLB Network's inaugural night on the air on January 1, 2009, supplemented with interviews of both Larsen and Yogi Berra by Bob Costas. The first inning of the telecast is still considered lost and was not aired by the MLB Network or included in a subsequent DVD release of the game.

The Mutual network aired the Series on radio, with Bob Wolff and Bob Neal announcing. This was the final World Series broadcast for Mutual, which had covered the event since 1935; NBC's radio network would gain exclusive national rights to baseball the following season.

== See also ==
- 1956 Japan Series
- 1956 Global World Series
- Subway Series / Dodgers–Yankees rivalry
