= 1956 New York Yankees season =

Season for the Major League Baseball team the New York Yankees

1956 New York Yankees
- World Series champions American League champions
- League: American League
- Ballpark: Yankee Stadium
- City: New York City
- Record: 97–57 (.630)
- League place: 1st
- Owners: Dan Topping and Del Webb
- General managers: George Weiss
- Managers: Casey Stengel
- Television: WPIX
- Radio: WINS (AM) (Mel Allen, Jim Woods, Red Barber)

The 1956 New York Yankees season was the 54th season for the team. The team finished with a record of 97–57, winning their 22nd pennant, finishing nine games ahead of the Cleveland Indians. New York was managed by Casey Stengel. The Yankees played their home games at Yankee Stadium. In the World Series, they defeated the Brooklyn Dodgers in seven games. The Series featured the first no-hitter in Series play and only World Series perfect game, delivered by the Yankees' Don Larsen in Game 5.

== Offseason ==
- February 8, 1956: Lou Berberet, Bob Wiesler, Herb Plews, Dick Tettelbach, and a player to be named later were traded by the Yankees to the Washington Senators for Mickey McDermott and Bobby Kline. The Yankees completed the deal by sending Whitey Herzog to the Senators on April 2.

== Regular season ==
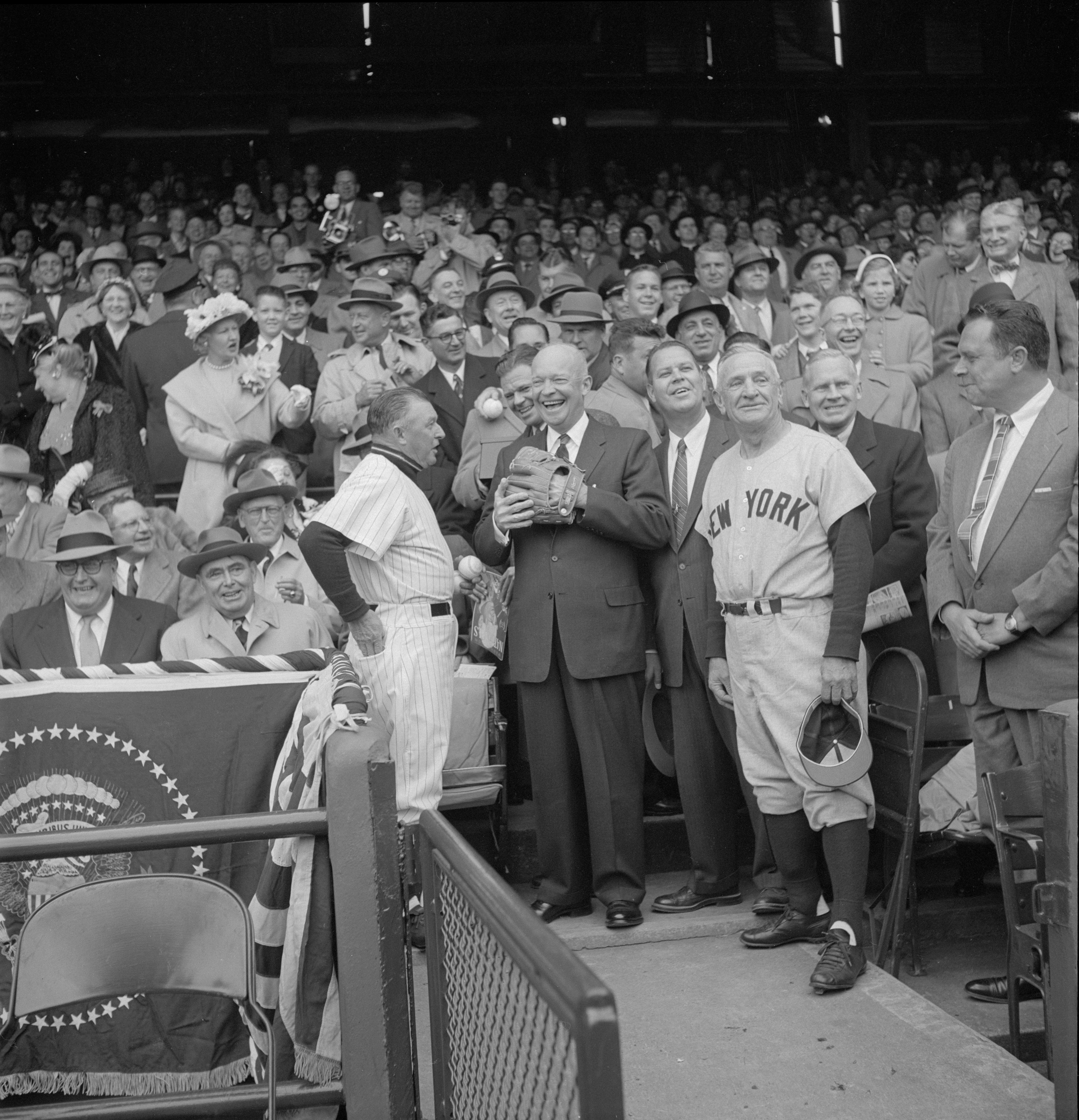
Opening Day on April 17, 1956

- April 17, 1956: Opening Day at Washington D.C. With president Dwight D. Eisenhower in attendance, Mickey Mantle began his triple crown year with two mammoth home runs in a 10–4 Yankees win over The Senators.
- April 18, 1956: Umpire Eddie Rommel was the first umpire to wear glasses in a major league game. The game was played between the Yankees and the Washington Senators.
- September 18, 1956: In a historic day for the Yankees. Mickey Mantle hit a game-winning home run in the 11th inning to give the Yankees a 3–2 win over The Chicago White Sox in Chicago. It was Mickey's 50th homer this season becoming the first Yankee since Babe Ruth in 1928 to hit 50 home runs in a season. This win also clinched the Yankees as American League champions.

=== Season standings ===
American League
Team	W	L	Pct.	GB	Home	Road
New York Yankees	97	57	.630	—	49‍–‍28	48‍–‍29
Cleveland Indians	88	66	.571	9	46‍–‍31	42‍–‍35
Chicago White Sox	85	69	.552	12	46‍–‍31	39‍–‍38
Boston Red Sox	84	70	.545	13	43‍–‍34	41‍–‍36
Detroit Tigers	82	72	.532	15	37‍–‍40	45‍–‍32
Baltimore Orioles	69	85	.448	28	41‍–‍36	28‍–‍49
Washington Senators	59	95	.383	38	32‍–‍45	27‍–‍50
Kansas City Athletics	52	102	.338	45	22‍–‍55	30‍–‍47

=== Record vs. opponents ===
1956 American League record Sources:
Team	BAL	BOS	CWS	CLE	DET	KCA	NYY	WSH
Baltimore	—	6–16	9–13	5–17	13–9	15–7	9–13	12–10
Boston	16–6	—	14–8	13–9–1	12–10	12–10	8–14	9–13
Chicago	13–9	8–14	—	15–7	13–9	14–8	9–13	13–9
Cleveland	17–5	9–13–1	7–15	—	11–11	17–5	10–12	17–5
Detroit	9–13	10–12	9–13	11–11	—	16–6	12–10	15–7–1
Kansas City	7–15	10–12	8–14	5–17	6–16	—	4–18	12–10
New York	13–9	14–8	13–9	12–10	10–12	18–4	—	17–5
Washington	10–12	13–9	9–13	5–17	7–15–1	10–12	5–17	—

=== Notable transactions ===
- May 28, 1956: Gerry Staley was selected off waivers from the Yankees by the Chicago White Sox.
- June 14, 1956: Lou Skizas and Eddie Robinson were traded by the Yankees to the Kansas City Athletics for Moe Burtschy, Bill Renna and cash.
- July 11, 1956: Wally Burnette was traded by the Yankees to the Kansas City Athletics for Tommy Lasorda.
- August 25, 1956: Enos Slaughter was selected off waivers by the Yankees from the Kansas City Athletics.

=== Roster ===
1956 New York Yankees
Roster
Pitchers: 23 Tommy Byrne; 52 Jim Coates; 30 Rip Coleman; 21 Sonny Dixon; 16 Whitey Ford; 55 Bob Grim; 21 Jim Konstanty; 53 Johnny Kucks; 18 Don Larsen; 22 Mickey McDermott; 28 Tom Morgan; 24 Gerry Staley; 47 Tom Sturdivant; 21 Ralph Terry; 19 Bob Turley	Catchers: 8 Yogi Berra; 29 Charlie Silvera; Infielders: 6 Andy Carey; 40 Tom Carroll; 42 Jerry Coleman; 20 Billy Hunter; 11 Jerry Lumpe; 1 Billy Martin; 12 Gil McDougald; 17 Bobby Richardson; 10 Phil Rizzuto; 36 Eddie Robinson; 14 Bill Skowron	Outfielders: 9 Hank Bauer; 41 Bob Cerv; 15 Joe Collins; 32 Elston Howard; 7 Mickey Mantle; 25 Irv Noren; 36 Norm Siebern; 17 Enos Slaughter; 39 George Wilson; Other batters: 45 Lou Skizas	Manager: 37 Casey Stengel; Coaches: 2 Frankie Crosetti; 33 Bill Dickey; 31 Jim Turner

== Player stats ==
= Indicates team leader

= Indicates league leader

=== Batting ===
==== Starters by position ====
Note: Pos = Position; G = Games played; AB = At bats; H = Hits; Avg. = Batting average; HR = Home runs; RBI = Runs batted in

Pos	Player	G	AB	H	Avg.	HR	RBI
C	Yogi Berra	140	521	155	.298	30	105
1B	Bill Skowron	134	464	143	.308	23	90
2B	Billy Martin	121	458	121	.264	9	49
3B	Andy Carey	132	422	100	.238	7	50
SS	Gil McDougald	120	438	136	.311	13	56
LF	Elston Howard	98	290	76	.262	5	34
CF	Mickey Mantle	150	533	188	.353	52	130
RF	Hank Bauer	147	539	130	.241	26	84

==== Other batters ====
Note: G = Games played; AB = At bats; H = Hits; Avg. = Batting average; HR = Home runs; RBI = Runs batted in

Player	G	AB	H	Avg.	HR	RBI
Joe Collins	100	262	59	.225	7	43
Jerry Coleman	80	183	47	.257	0	18
Norm Siebern	54	162	33	.204	4	21
Bob Cerv	54	115	35	.304	3	25
Enos Slaughter	24	83	24	.289	0	4
Billy Hunter	39	75	21	.280	0	11
Jerry Lumpe	20	62	16	.258	0	4
Eddie Robinson	26	54	12	.222	5	11
Phil Rizzuto	31	52	12	.231	0	6
Irv Noren	29	37	8	.216	0	6
Tom Carroll	36	17	6	.353	0	0
George Wilson	11	12	2	.167	0	0
Charlie Silvera	7	9	2	.222	0	2
Bobby Richardson	5	7	1	.143	0	0
Lou Skizas	6	6	1	.167	0	1

=== Pitching ===
==== Starting pitchers ====
Note: G = Games pitched; IP = Innings pitched; W = Wins; L = Losses; ERA = Earned run average; SO = Strikeouts

Player	G	IP	W	L	ERA	SO
Whitey Ford	31	225.2	19	6	2.47	141
Johnny Kucks	34	224.1	18	9	3.85	67
Bob Turley	27	132.0	8	4	5.05	91
Ralph Terry	3	13.1	1	2	9.45	8

==== Other pitchers ====
Note: G = Games pitched; IP = Innings pitched; W = Wins; L = Losses; ERA = Earned run average; SO = Strikeouts

Player	G	IP	W	L	ERA	SO
Don Larsen	38	179.2	11	5	3.26	107
Tom Sturdivant	32	158.1	16	8	3.30	110
Rip Coleman	29	88.1	3	5	3.67	42
Mickey McDermott	23	87.0	2	6	4.24	38
Bob Grim	26	74.2	6	1	2.77	48

==== Relief pitchers ====
Note: G = Games pitched; W = Wins; L = Losses; SV = Saves; ERA = Earned run average; SO = Strikeouts

Player	G	W	L	SV	ERA	SO
Tom Morgan	41	6	7	11	4.16	20
Tommy Byrne	37	7	3	6	3.36	52
Jim Konstanty	8	0	0	2	4.91	6
Sonny Dixon	3	0	1	1	2.08	1
Jim Coates	2	0	0	0	13.50	0
Gerry Staley	1	0	0	0	108.00	1

== 1956 World Series ==
AL New York Yankees (4) vs. NL Brooklyn Dodgers (3)

Game	Score	Date	Location	Attendance
1	Yankees – 3, Dodgers – 6	October 3	Ebbets Field	34,479
2	Yankees – 8, Dodgers – 13	October 5	Ebbets Field	36,217
3	Dodgers – 3, Yankees – 5	October 6	Yankee Stadium	73,977
4	Dodgers – 2, Yankees – 6	October 7	Yankee Stadium	69,705
5	Dodgers – 0, Yankees – 2	October 8	Yankee Stadium	64,519
6	Yankees – 0, Dodgers – 1 (10 innings)	October 9	Ebbets Field	33,224
7	Yankees – 9, Dodgers – 0	October 10	Ebbets Field	33,782

== Awards and honors ==
- Don Larsen, Babe Ruth Award
- Mickey Mantle, American League MVP
- Mickey Mantle, Associated Press Athlete of the Year

All-Star Game

== Farm system ==
Level	Team	League	Manager
AAA	Denver Bears	American Association	Ralph Houk
AAA	Richmond Virginians	International League	Eddie Lopat
AA	Birmingham Barons	Southern Association	Phil Page
A	Binghamton Triplets	Eastern League	Fred Fitzsimmons
B	Winston-Salem Twins	Carolina League	George Hausmann and Lee "Pete" Peterson
B	Quincy Gems	Illinois–Indiana–Iowa League	Vern Hoscheit
C	Modesto Reds	California League	Al Lyons
C	Monroe Sports	Evangeline League	Ed Head
D	St. Petersburg Saints	Florida State League	Ken Silvestri
D	Kearney Yankees	Nebraska State League	Randy Gumpert
D	Bradford Yankees	PONY League	Randy Gumpert
D	McAlester Rockets	Sooner State League	Marvin Crater

Bradford club folded, May 18, 1956
