= Babe Pinelli =

American baseball player and umpire (1895–1984)

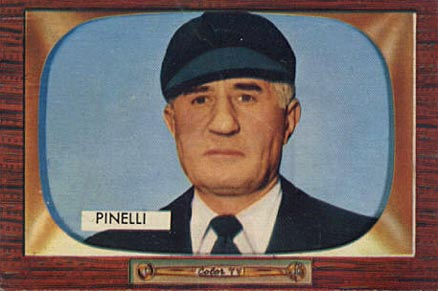
- Third baseman
- Born: October 18, 1895; San Francisco, California, U.S.
- Died: October 22, 1984 (aged 89); Daly City, California, U.S.
- Batted: Right Threw: Right

MLB debut
- August 3, 1918, for the Chicago White Sox

Last MLB appearance
- June 17, 1927, for the Cincinnati Reds

MLB statistics
- Batting average: .276
- Home runs: 5
- Runs batted in: 298
- Stats at Baseball Reference

Teams
- Chicago White Sox (1918); Detroit Tigers (1920); Cincinnati Reds (1922–1927)

Ralph Arthur "Babe" Pinelli, born Rinaldo Angelo Paolinelli (October 18, 1895 – October 22, 1984), was an American third baseman and umpire in Major League Baseball. Born in San Francisco, his playing career was mostly with the Cincinnati Reds from 1922 to 1927. He also played with the Chicago White Sox (1918) and Detroit Tigers (1920). After that he became a highly regarded National League umpire from 1935 to 1956, officiating in 6 World Series: 1939, 1941, 1947, 1948 (outfield only), 1952 and 1956; he was crew chief for the final two Series. He also umpired in the All-Star game in 1937, 1941, 1950 and 1956, working behind home plate for the second half of the last three games, and he worked in the 3-game series to determine the NL champion in 1946.

Pinelli wrote an article for The Second Fireside Book of Baseball, titled "Kill the Umpire? Don't Make Me Laugh!" in which he told about his rookie year of 1935, when he was told that he should not call a strike on Babe Ruth, who was winding up his career with the Boston Braves. Pinelli did not see it that way. When he was behind the plate and Ruth came to bat, and a close pitch went by at which Ruth did not swing, Pinelli deemed it a strike and so called it. Ruth turned to the umpire and bellowed, "There's forty thousand people in this park that know that was a ball, tomato-head!" Pinelli did not lose his cool. He replied calmly, "Perhaps—but mine is the only opinion that counts." Ruth had no answer for that.

His final game as a home plate umpire provided an extraordinary capstone to his career. He was behind the plate for Don Larsen's perfect Game 5 in the 1956 World Series. His final call as a plate ump presumably was "Strike 3! You're out!" to pinch-hitter Dale Mitchell. Pinelli later recalled that after the game, he returned to the umpires' room and burst into tears. It has often been reported that that was Pinelli's final game as an umpire, but that is incorrect; Pinelli was a field umpire for the final two games of the Series, and then called it a career.

In his book The Game of Baseball, Gil Hodges recounted a story of how, while dressing for a game, he and several other Brooklyn Dodgers debated which umpires were most likely and least likely to eject a player from a game. Hodges recalled that Pee Wee Reese expressed the opinion that Pinelli was the umpire least likely to throw a player out. Reese was indeed ejected from that day's game—by Pinelli.

Pinelli died at age 89 in Daly City, California. He was elected to the National Italian American Sports Hall of Fame in 2000.
