= Tom Gorman (umpire) =

American baseball umpire (1919–1986)

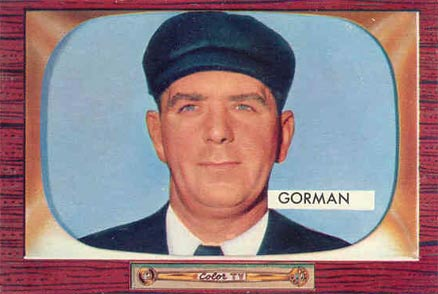
- Pitcher/Umpire
- Born: March 16, 1919; New York City, New York, U.S.
- Died: August 11, 1986 (aged 67); Closter, New Jersey, U.S.
- Batted: Right Threw: Left

MLB debut
- September 14, 1939, for the New York Giants

Last MLB appearance
- September 18, 1939, for the New York Giants

MLB statistics
- Win–loss record: 0–0
- Earned run average: 7.20
- Strikeouts: 2
- Stats at Baseball Reference

Teams
- New York Giants (1939)

Thomas David Gorman (March 16, 1919 – August 11, 1986) was an American pitcher and umpire in Major League Baseball who pitched five innings in four games with the New York Giants in 1939, then went on to serve as a National League umpire from 1951 to 1976, and afterward as a league supervisor.

His son Brian was a major league umpire from 1991 to 2021 and wore the same uniform number 9 the elder Gorman wore after the National League began adding numbers to umpire uniforms in 1970. He was promoted to be a crew chief in 2010.

== Early life ==
Gorman was born in New York City and grew up in the Hell's Kitchen neighborhood. He attended high school at the now-defunct Power Memorial Academy. After pitching in the minor leagues for three years, he served in the Army in Europe as a member of the 16th Infantry Regiment ("New York's Own") during World War II. An injury in 1946 ended his playing career; faced with the choice of returning to New York City and becoming a plumber, he became aware of an umpiring position in the New England League, and although he felt he was not cut out to be an umpire, his wife persuaded him to take the position for the 1947 season for $180 per month. He later moved up to the International League in 1949. He also coached baseball at Rice High School in Manhattan, a Christian Brothers school.

== Career ==
After joining the NL staff, he umpired in the World Series in 1956, 1958, 1963, 1968 and 1974, serving as crew chief in the last two Series. In 1956, he was in left field for Don Larsen's perfect game. In Game 1 of the 1968 Series, he called balls and strikes as Bob Gibson of the St. Louis Cardinals struck out a Series-record 17 Detroit Tigers.

He also officiated in the National League Championship Series in 1971 and 1975, serving as crew chief in 1971, and in the three-game playoff to determine the NL champion in 1959. He also worked in the All-Star Game in 1954, 1958, 1960 (both games) and 1969, calling balls and strikes for the second half of the second 1960 game. During a game in the 1962 season, he discovered the Giants (by now in San Francisco) were having their groundskeepers water down the Candlestick Park infield to slow down the Los Angeles Dodgers' Maury Wills; Gorman stopped the game for an hour and a half to allow the field to dry out.

Among the notable games in which he umpired were nine no-hitters, tying a record for NL umpires shared by Frank Secory and Augie Donatelli; he tied the mark on July 9, 1976, working second base in Larry Dierker's 6–0 win. Paul Pryor, who also officiated in that game, tied the mark himself later that year, and broke it upon working in his 10th no-hitter in 1978. Gorman was the home plate umpire for two no-hitters – Warren Spahn's first on September 16, 1960, and Bill Stoneman's first on April 17, 1969. He was the left field umpire for Don Larsen's perfect game in the 1956 World Series. He was the home plate umpire on June 15, 1952, when the St. Louis Cardinals set an NL record by overcoming an 11–0 deficit to beat the Giants 14–12, and again two weeks later on June 29 when the Chicago Cubs scored seven runs with two out in the ninth inning to beat the Cincinnati Reds 9–8. Two years later, on August 8, 1954, he was again the home plate umpire when the Reds gave up a record 12 runs (all of them unearned) after there were two out and no one on base in the eighth inning of a 20–7 loss to the Brooklyn Dodgers; the inning ended only when Gil Hodges' bid for a grand slam was caught high off the center field wall. And on May 2, 1956, he was again behind the plate as the Giants and Cubs used 48 players in a 6–5, 17-inning New York victory; Cub Don Hoak struck out a record six times against six different pitchers. On April 17, 1964, he was the home plate umpire for the inaugural game at Shea Stadium between the New York Mets and the Pittsburgh Pirates.

In 1975 he was honored by the Al Somers Umpire School as the Outstanding Umpire of 1974. In his acceptance remarks, he said of umpiring, "It's a hard road but a good road. Sometimes you'll ask yourself if it's worth it. If you've got the guts and the skills, the answer is bound to be yes." He added, "People may come to see ballplayers, but there'd be no baseball without good umpires."

Mad magazine ran an article presenting hypothetical magazines from other planets. In the interplanetary version of Sports Illustrated, umpire Tom Gorman explains why he threw out a player from Venus: "He opened up ten mouths to me!"

== Personal life ==
Gorman married Margaret Fay on October 7, 1944, and they had three sons and a daughter before her death c. 1968; they resided in Whitestone, Queens until c. 1965, when they moved to Closter, New Jersey, where he would live until his death. Prior to moving to Closter, he and Margaret were invited to the White House by John F. Kennedy. Kennedy had met Gorman at a banquet where Gorman was the guest speaker. Gorman went home and told his wife to buy a new dress and she replied, "What for?" and he said, "For our trip to the White House." Margaret just ignored him until a White House staff member called their home and asked about their travel plans. Gorman was personal friends with Bob Hope. Gorman's autobiography Three and Two!, co-written with Hall of Fame sportswriter Jerome Holtzman, was published in 1979. Gorman died of a heart attack in Closter at age 67, and was buried in George Washington Memorial Park in Paramus, in his umpire's uniform with the ball-strike counter set at 3–2 in his hand.

== See also ==
- List of Major League Baseball umpires (disambiguation)
