= Don Larsen =

American baseball player (1929–2020)

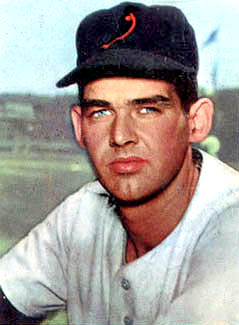
- Larsen with the Baltimore Orioles in 1954
- Pitcher
- Born: August 7, 1929; Michigan City, Indiana, U.S.
- Died: January 1, 2020 (aged 90); Hayden, Idaho, U.S.
- Batted: Right Threw: Right

MLB debut
- April 18, 1953, for the St. Louis Browns

Last MLB appearance
- July 7, 1967, for the Chicago Cubs

MLB statistics
- Win–loss record: 81–91
- Earned run average: 3.78
- Strikeouts: 849
- Stats at Baseball Reference

Teams
- St. Louis Browns / Baltimore Orioles (1953–1954); New York Yankees (1955–1959); Kansas City Athletics (1960–1961); Chicago White Sox (1961); San Francisco Giants (1962–1964); Houston Colt .45's / Astros (1964–1965); Baltimore Orioles (1965); Chicago Cubs (1967)

Career highlights and awards
- 2× World Series champion (1956, 1958); World Series MVP (1956); Pitched a perfect game in Game 5 of the 1956 World Series

Donald James Larsen (August 7, 1929 – January 1, 2020) was an American professional baseball pitcher. During a 15-year Major League Baseball (MLB) career, he pitched from 1953 to 1967 for seven different teams: the St. Louis Browns / Baltimore Orioles (1953–1954; 1965), New York Yankees (1955–1959), Kansas City Athletics (1960–1961), Chicago White Sox (1961), San Francisco Giants (1962–1964), Houston Colt .45's / Astros (1964–1965), and Chicago Cubs (1967).

Larsen pitched the sixth perfect game in MLB history, doing so in Game 5 of the 1956 World Series. It is the only solo no-hitter and perfect game in World Series history and is one of only three no-hitters in MLB postseason history. He won the World Series Most Valuable Player Award and Babe Ruth Award in recognition of his 1956 postseason.

== Early life ==
Larsen was born in Michigan City, Indiana. Larsen's family moved to San Diego, California, in 1944, where his mother became a housekeeper and his father worked as a department store salesman. Larsen attended Point Loma High School where he was a member of the basketball and baseball teams. He was selected for the All-Metro Conference team as a basketball player, and was offered several college scholarships to play basketball.

In baseball, Larsen's ability for the local American Legion team caught the attention of St. Louis Browns scout Art Schwartz. Schwartz signed Larsen to a contract to play for one of the Browns' minor league teams in 1947, with Larsen receiving an $850 signing bonus (about $11,652 as of September 2023). Larsen, on why he signed with the Browns over attending college, later said that he was "never much with the studies."

== Professional career ==
=== Minor leagues and military career ===
Larsen started his career with the Aberdeen Pheasants of the Class-C Northern League in 1947, appearing in 16 games. He had a 4–3 win–loss record and a 3.42 earned run average (ERA). The next season with Aberdeen, he won 17 games and had a 3.75 ERA in 34 games. Larsen started the 1949 season pitching for the Globe-Miami Browns of the Class-C Arizona–Texas League, before he moved up the minor league hierarchy, playing for the Springfield Browns in the Class-B Illinois–Indiana–Iowa League, and the Wichita Falls Spudders of the Class-B Big State League for the first half of the 1950 season. Larsen was promoted to the Wichita Indians of the Class-A Western League in the second half of the 1950 season. With the Indians, Larsen had a 6–4 record with a 3.14 ERA in 21 games. In 1951, Larsen was drafted to the United States Army for the Korean War. He spent the next two years in the Army, working in a variety of non-combat jobs. He was discharged from the Army in 1953 and made the St. Louis Browns roster prior to the beginning of the season.

=== St. Louis Browns / Baltimore Orioles (1953–1954) ===
Larsen made his Major League Baseball (MLB) debut with a start against the Detroit Tigers on April 17, 1953. He pitched five innings, giving up three earned runs, while striking out three in a no decision in an 8–7 Browns win. He had his first career win a little less than a month later, on May 12, against the Philadelphia Athletics, pitching 7 2/3 innings and giving up one earned run in a 7–3 win. For his rookie season, Larsen finished with a 7–12 record, 4.16 ERA and 96 strikeouts in 38 games, 22 of them starts. He finished first on the team in innings pitched (192 2/3) and complete games (7) and second on the team in strikeouts. Larsen also allowed the most hits with 202, and earned runs (89) on the squad. He also broke a major league record for pitchers by having seven consecutive hits at one point. He batted .284 with 3 home runs in 81 at bats in his rookie year.

The Browns relocated to Baltimore for the 1954 season, becoming the Baltimore Orioles. In 1954, Larsen went 3–21 with a 4.37 earned run average and 80 strikeouts in 29 games. It was the fewest wins by a pitcher with at least 20 losses since 1916; and no 20-loss pitcher has had as few wins since then, a span of 110 years. He led the major leagues in losses and finished third in the league in earned runs allowed (98). The Orioles won only 54 games that season, while having 100 losses, and finished the season in seventh place. Two of Larsen's three wins were against the New York Yankees, including a 10–0 shutout on July 30, his last win of the season. His other victory was against the Chicago White Sox on May 30.

=== New York Yankees (1955–1959) ===
In 1954, the New York Yankees, despite winning 103 games, finished second behind the Cleveland Indians in the American League. Yankees general manager George Weiss blamed the age of their pitching staff for their performance. The Yankees’ “Big Three” pitching staff of the late 1940s and early 1950s, Vic Raschi, Ed Lopat and Allie Reynolds, were in their late thirties, and wearing down. Raschi was traded to the Cardinals prior to the season, Reynolds retired because of a back injury and Lopat was ineffective and retired within a year. Two other pitchers in the staff, Johnny Sain and Tommy Byrne were also near the end of their careers. Desperate for young starting pitching behind staff ace Whitey Ford and promising starter Bob Grim, Weiss managed to find a trade partner with the Orioles. At the end of the season, Larsen was traded by the Baltimore Orioles as part of a 17-player trade, with Billy Hunter, Bob Turley and players to be named later to the Yankees for, most prominently, catcher Gus Triandos, and outfielder Gene Woodling. When the trade was announced Turley was considered the key player in the trade. During the 1954 season, Turley had a 14–15 record, and some observers considered Turley to have the "liveliest fastball" in the league. However, Weiss and Yankees manager Casey Stengel thought that Larsen had the most potential out of the two, having been impressed with Larsen's performance against the Yankees and demanded that he be included in the trade.

As a member of the New York Yankees from 1955 through 1959, Larsen was used by manager Casey Stengel as a backup starter and occasional reliever. He went 45–24 during his five seasons in New York, making 90 starts in 128 appearances.

=== 1955 season ===
Larsen reported to spring training with a sore shoulder and pitched ineffectively to start the year. He was quickly demoted to the Denver Bears, and Larsen, visibly upset, decided to "take my sweet time" reporting to the Bears. After staying in St. Louis for a week, Larsen had a change of heart and reported to the team. Larsen spent most of the first four months of the season with the Bears, only pitching in five games for the Yankees during that timespan. During the 1955 season, Larsen participated in nineteen games, starting 13 of them. He had a 9–2 record with a 3.07 ERA and 44 strikeouts in 97 innings pitched. Larsen pitched a shutout against Jim Bunning and the Detroit Tigers on August 5, 1955.

=== 1956 season ===
In 1956 Larsen achieved an 11–5 record, with a career best 107 strikeouts and a 3.26 ERA. Larsen was used in between the bullpen and the starting rotation for most of the season, participating in 38 games, starting 20. Larsen had a rough start to the season, and by the end of May he had a 5.64 ERA. He gradually improved and by the beginning of August, Larsen lowered his ERA below 4.00. In a seven start stretch to finish the season, Larsen had five complete games, and pitched 10 innings in another. He pitched a four-hit shutout against his former team (Orioles) in the second game of a doubleheader on September 3. He finished the season with a 7–3 victory against the Boston Red Sox on September 28.

==== 1956 World Series ====
The "everlasting image" of Yogi Berra leaping into Larsen's arms upon the completion of the perfect game

Larsen's most notable accomplishment was pitching the only perfect game in World Series history; it is one of only 24 perfect games in MLB history. He was pitching for the New York Yankees in Game 5 of the 1956 World Series against the Brooklyn Dodgers on October 8, 1956. His perfect game remained the only no-hitter of any type pitched in postseason play until Philadelphia Phillies pitcher Roy Halladay threw a no-hitter against the Cincinnati Reds on October 6, 2010, in Game 1 of the National League Division Series and the only World Series no-hitter until the combined no-hitter in Game 4 of the 2022 World Series thrown by the Houston Astros against the Philadelphia Phillies.

Stengel selected Larsen to start Game 2 of the Series. Despite being given a 6–0 lead by the Yankee batters, he lasted only 1 2/3 innings in a 13–8 loss. He gave up only one hit, a single by Gil Hodges. He walked four batters and allowed four runs in the process but, because of an error by first baseman Joe Collins, none of the runs were earned.

Larsen started Game 5 for the Yankees. His opponent in the game was Brooklyn's Sal Maglie. Larsen needed just 97 pitches to complete the perfect game, and only one Dodger batter (Pee Wee Reese in the first inning) was able to get a three-ball count. In 1998, Larsen recalled, "I had great control. I never had that kind of control in my life." Brooklyn's Maglie gave up only two runs on five hits. Mickey Mantle's fourth-inning home run broke the scoreless tie. The Yankees added an insurance run in the sixth. After Roy Campanella grounded out to Billy Martin for the second out of the 9th inning, Larsen faced pinch hitter Dale Mitchell, a .312 career hitter. Throwing fastballs, Larsen got ahead in the count at 1–2. On his 97th pitch, a called third strike by home plate umpire Babe Pinelli, Larsen caught Mitchell looking for the 27th and last out. After the pitch, catcher Yogi Berra leaped into Larsen's arms in celebration, setting up the "everlasting image". Larsen's unparalleled game earned him the World Series Most Valuable Player Award and Babe Ruth Award.

When the World Series ended, Larsen did a round of endorsements and promotional work around the United States, but he stopped soon after because it was "disrupting his routine".

=== 1957–1960 ===
In 1957, Larsen had a 10–4 record with 3.74 ERA in 27 games, 20 of them starts. Larsen again had a bad start to the season, giving out four earned runs in 1 1/3 innings pitched in his opening start against the Boston Red Sox. He gave up three consecutive hits to Gene Stephens, Gene Mauch and Sammy White to start the second inning, and after a sacrifice fly by pitcher Bob Porterfield, he gave up a double to Frank Malzone, and was taken out of the game. On May 26, Larsen gave up four earned runs in less than one inning in a start against the Washington Senators. He started another game two days later against the Red Sox and by the end of the month his ERA was over 6. He improved by the end of the season, hurling a 3-hit shutout against the Kansas City Athletics on September 15. In the 1957 World Series against the Milwaukee Braves, he pitched seven innings in relief in Game 3, getting the win in a 12–3 blowout. He started the seventh game of the Series, lasting 2 1/3 innings in a 5–0 loss as the Braves won the Series.

Larsen won the third game in the 1958 World Series. Like the 1957 World Series, it went to a seventh game, and Larsen was New York's starting pitcher. He lasted just 2 1/3 innings, taking a no-decision. Both the Yankees' and Don Larsen's fortunes would dip in 1959. New York slipped to third place and Don Larsen dropped below .500 for the first time in his Yankee career, going 6–7.

=== Kansas City Athletics (1960–1961) ===
Larsen was traded to the Kansas City Athletics with Hank Bauer, Norm Siebern and Marv Throneberry for Roger Maris, Joe DeMaestri, and Kent Hadley. In July 1960, the Athletics sent Larsen back to the minors.

=== Chicago White Sox (1961) ===
In 1961, Larsen went 8–2 while playing for both the Athletics and the Chicago White Sox, to whom he was traded in June 1961 with Andy Carey, Ray Herbert and Al Pilarcik for Wes Covington, Stan Johnson, Bob Shaw and Gerry Staley.

=== San Francisco Giants (1962–1964) ===
After the 1961 season, Larsen was traded to the San Francisco Giants with Billy Pierce for Bob Farley, Eddie Fisher and Dom Zanni and a player to be named later (Verle Tiefenthaler). Larsen became a full-time relief pitcher, anchoring a strong bullpen that included Bobby Bolin and Stu Miller. He had five wins with 11 saves for the pennant-winning Giants. Larsen won the deciding game of the three-game playoff series against the Los Angeles Dodgers, relieving Juan Marichal in the eighth inning. In the 1962 World Series, Larsen won Game 4 pitching in relief, giving him a career World Series record of 4–2 with a 2.75 ERA. During his time with the Giants, Larsen earned the nickname of "Froggy" due to his hobby of hunting frogs and serving marinated frog legs to his Giants teammates.

=== Houston Colt .45's / Astros (1964–1965) ===
In 1964, the Giants sold Larsen to the Houston Colt .45s, who pressed Larsen back into a starting role. He responded with a 4–8 record and a 2.27 ERA.

=== Baltimore Orioles (1965) ===
In 1965, Larsen was traded to the Orioles for Bob Saverine and cash. The Orioles released him prior to the 1966 season, and he pitched the year for the Phoenix Giants of the Class-AAA Pacific Coast League (PCL) in the San Francisco minor league organization.

=== Chicago Cubs (1967) ===
Larsen was on the Chicago Cubs roster for two weeks of the 1967 season, pitching only four innings in what would be his final stint in the major leagues. He spent the rest of the season with the Dallas-Fort Worth Spurs of the Class-AA Texas League. Larsen started the 1968 season in the Cubs' minor league system, pitching for the San Antonio Missions of the Texas League and Tacoma Cubs of the PCL, before retiring in the summer.

Larsen hit well for a pitcher, finishing his career with a .242 average, 14 home runs and 72 runs batted in. One of his four-baggers matched his famous achievement on the mound, and in the same season, as he stroked a grand slam against the Boston Red Sox on April 22, 1956, in a game in which he pitched 4 innings. He was regarded well enough by his managers that he was used as a pinch hitter 66 times.

== Pitching style ==
In his prime, Larsen was an athletically built (6'4", 215 lb), right-handed overhand power pitcher, who admitted to having poorer control than most pitchers in his era, but he trusted the framing by Yogi Berra to set him to aim low and outside batters, and mostly across the body. He was also known to have no windup or leg kick, a technique usually used by modern pitchers when there are runners on base. Because his action was so compact and he did not throw many changeups or breaking balls, runners could not easily steal on him.

== Life after playing ==
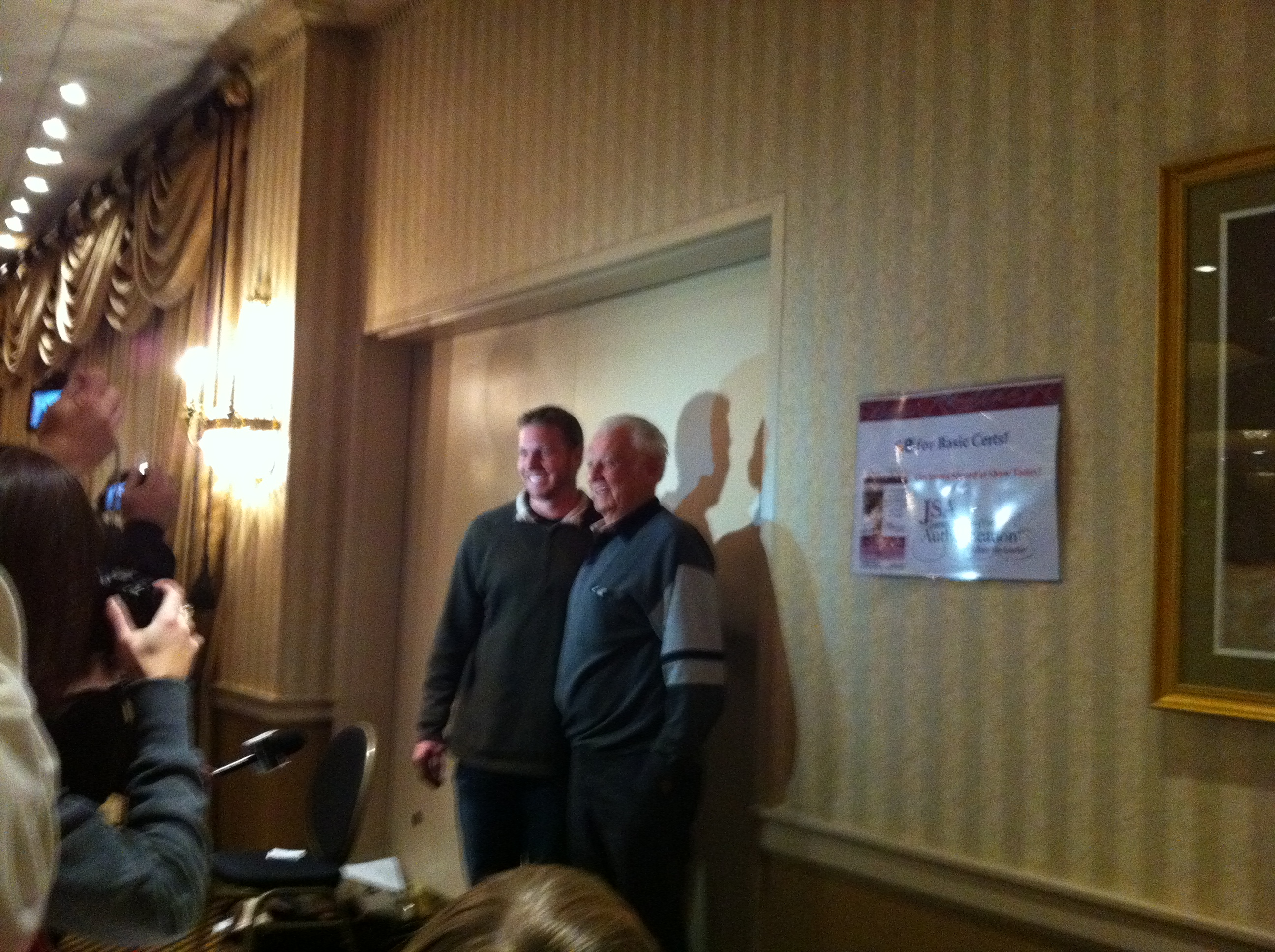
Roy Halladay and Don Larsen, the only two pitchers to throw solo postseason no-hitters in MLB history

After retiring from baseball, Larsen attempted to work in the front office of a major league organization (it is not known which one), and as a liquor salesman; neither career worked out. He became an executive for a paper company, working with farmers who worked in California's Salinas Valley.

In 1964, Larsen was inducted by the San Diego Hall of Champions into the Breitbard Hall of Fame honoring San Diego's finest athletes both on and off the playing surface.

Larsen, with writer Mark Shaw, released an autobiography, The Perfect Yankee: The Incredible Story of the Greatest Miracle in Baseball History that was published in 1996.

Larsen was also at David Cone's perfect game in 1999. Cone's game took place on Yogi Berra Day; Larsen threw out the ceremonial first pitch to Berra before the game. Larsen said it was the first game he had seen in person from start to finish since his retirement.

== Personal life and death ==
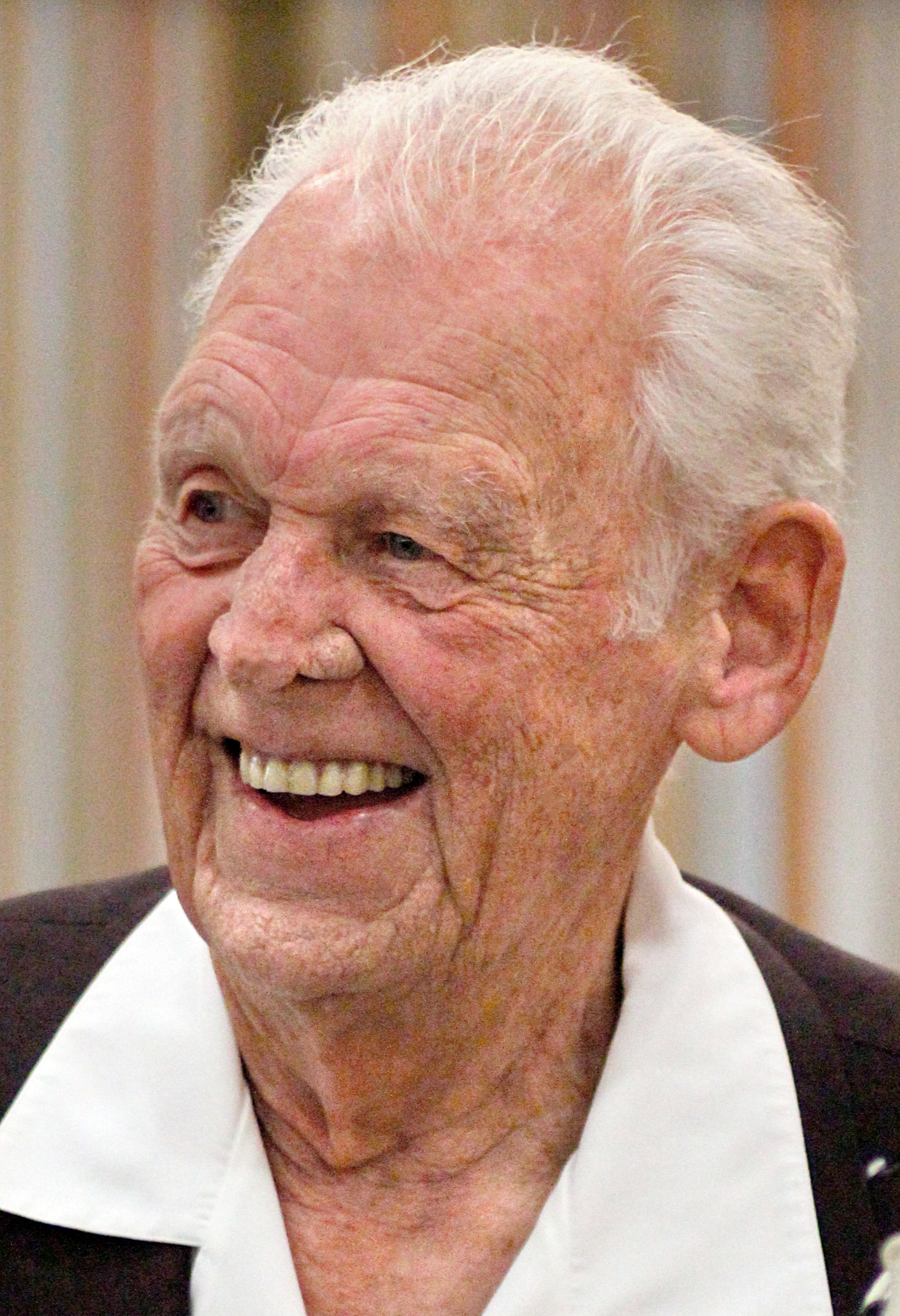
Larsen at age 84.

Larsen married his first wife, Vivian, in 1955, out of a sense of duty after she became pregnant with his child. The day of his perfect game, they were estranged, and she was in court, obtaining a show-cause order demanding that MLB Commissioner Ford Frick withhold her husband's World Series share and apply it to $420 that she owed in support payments. They were divorced in 1957. Larsen and his second wife, Corrine, were married for over 60 years. They lived in Hayden Lake, Idaho. It was reported in 2012 that he put up for auction the uniform he had worn to pitch his perfect game to pay for expenses of his grandchildren's college education.

Larsen died on January 1, 2020, from esophageal cancer at the age of 90 in Hayden Lake, Idaho.

== Personality ==
Larsen was known for his personality and his enjoyment of the nightlife, especially in New York City. During his time in minor-league baseball, Larsen first developed a reputation as a "fun-loving guy" who liked to go out to bars and have a drink, according to teammate Bob Turley. When he broke into the Majors with the St. Louis Browns, Larsen started violating a time-limit curfew that was set by managers Marty Marion and then Jimmy Dykes. He was nicknamed "Gooneybird" for his antics.

Awards and achievements
Preceded by Charlie Robertson	Perfect game pitcher October 8, 1956	Succeeded by Jim Bunning
Preceded by Sal Maglie	No-hitter pitcher October 8, 1956	Succeeded by Bob Keegan
