= Jack Urban =

American baseball player (1928–2006)

- Pitcher
- Born: December 5, 1928; Omaha, Nebraska, U.S.
- Died: June 26, 2006 (aged 77); Omaha, Nebraska, U.S.
- Batted: Right Threw: Right

MLB debut
- June 13, 1957, for the Kansas City Athletics

Last MLB appearance
- August 6, 1959, for the St. Louis Cardinals

MLB statistics
- Win–loss record: 15–15
- Earned run average: 4.83
- Strikeouts: 113
- Stats at Baseball Reference

Teams
- Kansas City Athletics (1957–1958); St. Louis Cardinals (1959)

Jack Elmer Urban (December 5, 1928 – June 26, 2006) was an American professional baseball pitcher who appeared in 69 games in the Major Leagues, 37 as a starter, for the Kansas City Athletics (1957–1958) and St. Louis Cardinals (1959). Listed as 5 feet 8 inches (1.73 m) tall and 155 pounds (70 kg), he threw and batted right-handed.

Urban was born in Omaha, Nebraska, where he attended Technical High School. Originally signed by the New York Yankees before the 1949 season, he spent six full years in the Bronx Bombers' organization (as well as two years in the military) before his 1957 trade to the Athletics in a 13-player blockbuster. The Yankees sent Irv Noren, Milt Graff, Mickey McDermott, Tom Morgan, Rip Coleman, Billy Hunter and Urban (as a player to be named later) to the Athletics for Art Ditmar. Bobby Shantz, Jack McMahan, Wayne Belardi and two players to be named later, who would end up being Curt Roberts and Clete Boyer.

In the minors, Urban won 23 games in the Class D Sooner State League (1950), followed by a 17-win season in the Class B Illinois-Indiana-Iowa League (1950). In 1954, Urban tossed a no-hitter for the Birmingham Barons of the Double-A Southern Association.

He made a successful big league debut on June 13, 1957, at the age of 28. Facing the Washington Senators, he tossed a complete game, allowing only two runs and five hits. Although the team as a whole finished 59–94 on the year, Urban did exceptionally well compared to that, compiling a 7–4 record and a 3.34 earned run average in 1291/3 innings pitched, he allowed only 111 hits and 45 walks.

Experiencing a sophomore slump, his 1958 season was not so impressive, however. In 30 games – 24 of which were starts – he went 8–11 with a 5.93 ERA. In 132 innings of work, he allowed 150 hits and 51 walks.

He was traded back to the Yankees on April 8, 1959 for Mark Freeman. Urban never appeared in a Yankees uniform, however; he was purchased by the Cardinals in May of that year. Appearing in only eight games for St. Louis, Urban allowed 18 hits, seven walks and 11 earned runs in 102/3 innings for a 9.28 ERA. He played his final game on August 6, 1959 against the Pittsburgh Pirates. Although he entered the majors with a bang, he left them with a bust – in only one-third of an inning, he allowed a total of five runs.

Overall, in his three-year MLB career, Urban went 15–15 with a 4.83 ERA. In 272 innings, he allowed 279 hits, 103 walks, and he also had 113 strikeouts. He threw one shutout, a four-hitter on July 14, 1958, also against Washington. A respectable hitter (for a pitcher), he hit .209 in 86 career at-bats. In the minor leagues he won 89 games, lost 56 games for a winning percentage of .614. As a minor league hitter, in 698 at bats he had 187 hits for an average of .269, with 27 doubles, 10 triples and 14 homeruns, and 88 RBI.
