= Rip Coleman =

American baseball player (1931–2004)

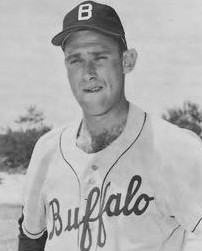
- Pitcher
- Born: July 31, 1931; Troy, New York, U.S.
- Died: May 14, 2004 (aged 72); Wolfeboro, New Hampshire, U.S.
- Batted: Left Threw: Left

MLB debut
- August 15, 1955, for the New York Yankees

Last MLB appearance
- May 5, 1960, for the Baltimore Orioles

MLB statistics
- Win–loss record: 7–25
- Earned run average: 4.58
- Strikeouts: 130

Teams
- New York Yankees (1955–1956); Kansas City Athletics (1957, 1959); Baltimore Orioles (1959–1960)

Career highlights and awards
- World Series champion (1956)

Walter Gary "Rip" Coleman (July 31, 1931 – May 14, 2004) was an American professional baseball player, a left-handed pitcher who played from 1955 to 1957 and 1959 to 1960 for the New York Yankees, Kansas City Athletics and Baltimore Orioles of Major League Baseball.

== Early life and education ==
A native of Troy, New York he attended Syracuse University and Wake Forest University.

== Professional baseball career ==
Before the 1952 season, Coleman was signed by the Yankees. He made his big league debut with them about three years later, on August 15, 1955. He went 2–1 in 10 games in his rookie season. In 29 innings of work, he allowed 40 hits and 17 earned runs for a 5.28 ERA. He also walked 16 batters and struck out only 15. He appeared in one game in the 1955 World Series, giving up five hits in one inning of work. In 1956 he lowered his ERA to 3.67. In 29 games (nine starts), he posted a 3–5 record with 42 walks and 42 strikeouts in 88 1/3 innings of work. On February 19, 1957, Coleman was involved in a multi-player trade between the Yankees and Athletics. The Yankees sent Coleman, Milt Graff, Billy Hunter, Mickey McDermott, Tom Morgan and Irv Noren to the Athletics for Art Ditmar, Bobby Shantz, Jack McMahan and Wayne Belardi. As players to be named later, the Yankees sent Jack Urban to the Athletics and the Athletics sent Curt Roberts and Clete Boyer to the Yankees to complete the trade. Coleman went 0–7 with a 5.93 ERA in 41 innings of work in 1957. He walked 25 batters, struck out 15 and allowed 53 hits.

He did not appear in the majors in 1958. In 1959, he found his way back into the majors. Overall, in 32 games (11 starts), he went 2–10 with a 4.34 ERA in 85 innings of work. On September 6 of that year he was selected off waivers by the Orioles. With them, he allowed no runs in four innings of work. 1960 would end up being Coleman's final season in the majors. He went 0–2 with an 11.25 ERA in five games, which included one start. Although he started a game, he pitched in only four innings total that year, walking five batters and striking out none.

Overall, Rip Coleman went 7–25 in his career. Of the 95 games he pitched, 33 of them were starts, three of those starts were complete games and one of those complete games was a shutout. In 247 1/3 innings, he saved five games, allowed 287 hits, 144 runs, 126 earned runs, 21 home runs and 124 walks. He struck out 130 batters and his ERA was 4.58. He was a poor hitter, collecting five hits in 69 at-bats for a .072 batting average.

== Death ==
After his death at age 72 in Wolfeboro, New Hampshire, he was buried in Oakwood Cemetery in Troy, New York.
