= Jack McMahan =

American baseball player (1932–2020)

- Pitcher
- Born: July 25, 1932; Hot Springs, Arkansas, U.S.
- Died: October 16, 2020 (aged 88); Hot Springs, Arkansas, U.S.
- Batted: Right Threw: Left

MLB debut
- April 18, 1956, for the Pittsburgh Pirates

Last MLB appearance
- September 23, 1956, for the Kansas City Athletics

MLB statistics
- Win–loss record: 0–5
- Earned run average: 5.04
- Strikeouts: 22
- Stats at Baseball Reference

Teams
- Pittsburgh Pirates (1956); Kansas City Athletics (1956)

Jack Wally McMahan (July 25, 1932 – October 16, 2020) was an American right-handed batting, left-handed throwing Major League Baseball pitcher who played in 1956 for the Pittsburgh Pirates and Kansas City Athletics.

McMahan attended University of Arkansas at Little Rock.

Originally signed by the New York Yankees prior to the 1952 season, McMahan was drafted by the Pirates from the Yankees in the 1955 Rule 5 draft.

McMahan made his big league debut on April 18, 1956. In eleven games with the Pirates, he posted a 6.08 ERA after allowing eighteen hits and nine earned runs in 13 1/3 innings of work. On June 23, he was traded by the Pirates with Curt Roberts to the Athletics for Spook Jacobs. Although he lowered his ERA with the Athletics to 4.82, he still went 0–5 in 23 games (nine starts) with them. In 61 2/3 innings, he walked 31 batters and struck out only 13. Between the two teams, he went 0–5 with a 5.04 ERA in 34 games (nine started). In exactly 75 innings of work, he allowed 87 hits and 40 walks. He had only 22 strikeouts. He was also an 0-fer as a batter as well — in 15 at bats, he collected zero hits (but he did strikeout 8 times). He played his final big league game on September 23.

Although he never appeared in the majors after 1956, McMahan was still active in the minors, and he was involved in a big trade that took place between the Athletics and Yankees while in the minors. On February 19, 1957, the Athletics — with players to be named later, Wayne Belardi, Art Ditmar, and Bobby Shantz — sent McMahan to the Yankees for a player to be named later, Irv Noren, Milt Graff, Mickey McDermott, Tom Morgan, Rip Coleman, and Billy Hunter. The Yankees sent Jack Urban to the Athletics to complete the trade. The Athletics sent Curt Roberts and Clete Boyer to the Yankees to complete the trade.

McMahan died on October 16, 2020.
