= Milt Graff =

American baseball player (1930-2005)

- Second baseman
- Born: December 30, 1930; Jefferson Center, Pennsylvania, U.S.
- Died: August 2, 2005 (aged 74); Rockdale, Texas, U.S.
- Batted: Left Threw: Right

MLB debut
- April 16, 1957, for the Kansas City Athletics

Last MLB appearance
- September 21, 1958, for the Kansas City Athletics

MLB statistics
- Batting average: .179
- Home runs: 0
- Runs batted in: 10
- Stats at Baseball Reference

Teams
- Kansas City Athletics (1957–1958)

Milton Edward Graff (December 30, 1930 - August 2, 2005) was an American Major League Baseball second baseman. He was born on Tuesday, December 30, 1930 in Jefferson Center, Pennsylvania. He was listed at a height of 5 ft 7 in (1.70 m) and a weight of 158 pounds. Graff attended Butler Senior High School and then attended Pennsylvania State University and Lycoming College. At Lycoming, he got a degree in accounting. He batted left-handed and threw right-handed.

== Playing career ==
Around 1949, Graff was signed by the Pittsburgh Pirates as an amateur free agent. Around eight years later, during which his baseball career was interrupted when he enlisted in the Army to fight in the Korean War, Graff made his major league debut on April 16, 1957 at the age of 26 with the Kansas City Athletics (he was sent to the Athletics from the New York Yankees, by whom he'd been drafted in 1955). He wore the number 4.

In 61 major league games, Graff batted .179 with 4 doubles, 3 triples and 0 home runs. He showed a good eye at the plate by walking 15 times and striking out only 10 times. In the field, Graff committed 3 errors for a .988 fielding percentage. He also was involved in 36 double plays.

Graff played his final game on September 21, 1958.

- On February 19, 1957, the New York Yankees sent Graff, Rip Coleman, Billy Hunter, Mickey McDermott, Tom Morgan and Irv Noren to the Kansas City Athletics for Art Ditmar, Bobby Shantz, Jack McMahan and Wayne Belardi.

== Life after baseball ==
After baseball, Graff held several jobs in the field of accounting and was involved in baseball as scouting director and infield coach for the Pirates and director of stadium operations for Three Rivers Stadium. He was involved in the building of Three Rivers Stadium. He also was a scout for the Pirates, San Francisco Giants and Cincinnati Reds. He also held multiple front office jobs.

In 1987, Lycoming honored Graff with a distinguished alumni award.

On August 2, 2005, Graff died in Rockdale, Texas of complications from Alzheimers. He chose to be cremated.
