= Billy Hunter (baseball) =

American baseball player (1928–2025)

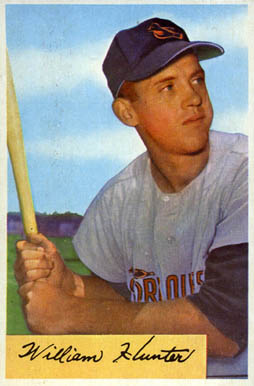
- Hunter on a 1954 baseball card
- Shortstop
- Born: June 4, 1928; Punxsutawney, Pennsylvania, U.S.
- Died: July 3, 2025 (aged 97); Lutherville, Maryland, U.S.
- Batted: Right Threw: Right

MLB debut
- April 14, 1953, for the St. Louis Browns

Last MLB appearance
- September 27, 1958, for the Cleveland Indians

MLB statistics
- Batting average: .219
- Home runs: 16
- Runs batted in: 144
- Managerial record: 146–108
- Winning %: .575
- Stats at Baseball Reference

Teams
- As player: St. Louis Browns / Baltimore Orioles (1953–1954); New York Yankees (1955–1956); Kansas City Athletics (1957–1958); Cleveland Indians (1958); As manager: Texas Rangers (1977–1978); As coach: Baltimore Orioles (1964–1977)

Career highlights and awards
- All-Star (1953); Baltimore Orioles Hall of Fame

Gordon William Hunter (June 4, 1928 – July 3, 2025) was an American baseball player, coach and manager in Major League Baseball (MLB). A shortstop, he was the last surviving player of the St. Louis Browns and the 1954 inaugural season of the modern Baltimore Orioles. Hunter was a reserve shortstop on the 1956 World Series winning New York Yankees, and third base coach on Baltimore Orioles teams that won the World Series in 1966 and 1970.

== Early life and education ==
Hunter was born in Punxsutawney, Pennsylvania, on June 4, 1928. He grew up in Indiana, Pennsylvania and attended Indiana High School. In 1947, Hunter attended Indiana State Teachers College (now Indiana University of Pennsylvania). In 1948, he transferred to Pennsylvania State University (Penn State) on a baseball and football scholarship, where he played as a T-formation quarterback.

== Playing career ==
Hunter was listed as 6 feet (1.83 m) tall and 180 pounds (82 kg). He threw and batted right-handed. After attending college, Hunter was signed by the Brooklyn Dodgers in 1948. He spent five years in Brooklyn's minor league system, with his best year coming in 1952 with the Fort Worth Cats of the Double-A Texas League. Hunter hit for a .285 batting average, had 75 runs batted in and 24 stolen bases, and led the Texas League in double plays (135) and stolen bases. He was chosen the Texas League's Most Valuable Player.

The Dodgers had Pee Wee Reese at shortstop, however, and it was unlikely Hunter would move up to replace Reese. He was traded to the St. Louis Browns of the American League (AL) on October 14, 1952, for three players (Ray Coleman, Stan Rojek, and Bob Mahoney), along with a $95,000 payment to the Dodgers. It was also reported at the time that the Browns paid the equivalent of $150,000. Hunter's manager with the Browns was Marty Marion, who had been the National League's premier fielding shortstop with the St. Louis Cardinals in the 1940s, and had been Hunter's boyhood idol; and Hunter impressed Marion with his fielding for the Browns. Hunter was the starting shortstop for the last Browns club in 1953 (and hit the team's final home run). He also made the American League All Star team that year. His lone Browns all-star teammate was Satchel Paige, and while he did not play the field or bat in the game, he was a pinch-runner for Mickey Mantle. He played 152 games at shortstop, leading all AL shortstops in assists with 512, as well as in errors with 25; and was fourth among shortstops in fielding percentage (.970). With the death of Ed Mickelson on June 27, 2025, Hunter became the last living St. Louis Brown.

Hunter was the first shortstop on the modern Baltimore Orioles team when the Browns moved to Maryland in 1954; he was the last living player from the 1954 Orioles prior to his death in 2025. He started a majority of the Orioles games at shortstop, and hit a career high .243. He was part of a multi-player trade between the Orioles and New York Yankees in November 1954. Among others, the Yankees also received pitchers Bob Turley (who would pitch in 15 World Series games for the Yankees) and Don Larsen (who pitched a perfect game for the Yankees in the 1956 World Series), and the Orioles received Gene Woodling, Gus Triandos (who became the Orioles starting catcher for the next seven years), and Willy Miranda (who replaced Hunter at shortstop). For the remainder of his career, however, Hunter was a second-string infielder for the Yankees, Kansas City Athletics, and Cleveland Indians.

Hunter played 98 games at shortstop for the Yankees in 1955, hitting .228 in 255 at bats. He was assigned to the Yankees' Triple-A affiliate Denver Bears in August, where he played in only 12 games before suffering a fractured leg. He was a member of the 1956 Yankees championship team for the season, but played in only 39 games and did not get into any of the seven world series games.

Before the 1957 season, the Yankees traded Hunter, along with Irv Noren, Milt Graff, Mickey McDermott, Tom Morgan, Rip Coleman, and a player to be named later to the Kansas City Athletics for Art Ditmar, Bobby Shantz, Jack McMahan, Wayne Belardi, and two players to be named later, one of whom was Clete Boyer. The Athletics and New York Yankees were frequent trading partners in the late 1950s, after a business friend of Yankees' owner Dan Topping bought the A's from Connie Mack's family in 1954. In 1957, Hunter started at second base for the A's, but hit only .191 in 116 games. In June 1958, the A's traded Hunter to the Cleveland Indians for Chico Carrasquel. In this, his final major league season, his combined batting average was .186 in 98 games played.

Hunter batted .219 with 16 home runs, and 144 RBI in 630 games over his six-year (1953–58) AL career. His final year of professional baseball was with the San Diego Padres of the Pacific Coast League in 1959.

== Scout and coach ==
When Hunter finished his playing career, he scouted for the Indians and Orioles. He managed the Bluefield Orioles to Appalachian League championships in 1962 and 1963. Hunter was promoted to third base coach for Baltimore on November 20, 1963, by his former Yankees teammate Hank Bauer, who had become the team's manager one day earlier. Bauer was fired in 1968, but new Orioles manager Earl Weaver kept Hunter on as his third base coach. He performed that role for almost 14 seasons for four AL champions and two World Series winners (1966 and 1970). When Weaver was ejected in game 4 of the 1969 World Series, Hunter filled in as manager. Hunter declined an offer from former Orioles general manager Harry Dalton to manage the California Angels on November 23, 1971.

== MLB manager and college head coach ==
Hunter departed from the Orioles on June 27, 1977, to become the Texas Rangers' fourth manager that season, succeeding Connie Ryan, who had served in the interim for six games. His appointment ended the Rangers' search for a new manager, which had begun five days prior with Frank Lucchesi's dismissal, followed by Eddie Stanky's one-game stint. Despite the team trailing by 5 1/2 games in fifth place in the AL West, he stated upon his arrival, "I am accepting this job because I think the Texas Rangers have a contending team." Under Hunter, the Rangers won 60 of their final 93 games and climbed from fifth to second place. He lost out in manager of the year voting to Earl Weaver.

In 1978, the Rangers finished tied for second, five games behind the division-winning Kansas City Royals. During the season, Hunter had a confrontation with pitcher Dock Ellis on a team bus. Ellis was later quoted saying Hunter "may be Hitler, but he ain't making no lampshade out of me." After turning down a five-year contract extension in midseason, offered by Rangers' owner Brad Corbett, Hunter was fired with one day left in the campaign due to his poor relationship with his team. When asked if he was sorry he took the manager's job, Hunter replied "yes." Just one year earlier, first baseman Mike Hargrove had called Hunter "'a perfect blend of knowing how to handle people, plus knowing the game.'"

Hunter's record over his one-and-a-half seasons was 146–108 (.575), but he never returned to the Major Leagues as a coach or manager, though he claimed to have received a half dozen job offers in the winter of 1978. He became head baseball coach (1979–1988) and athletic director (1984–1995) at Maryland's Towson State University, retiring in 1995. During his time as athletic director the men's lacrosse team went to the NCAA championship game and the men's basketball team twice reached the NCAA tournament. Also while athletic director, he served as president of the East Coast Conference and Big South Conference.

== Death ==
Hunter died in Lutherville, Maryland on July 3, 2025, at age 97. At the time of his death, Hunter was the last living member of the St. Louis Browns and the 1954 Baltimore Orioles.

== Honors ==
Hunter was a 1996 honoree into the Orioles Hall of Fame, inducted with Jerry Hoffberger and Cal Ripken, Sr. These three men were so well thought of in Baltimore that a crowd of 400 showed up at the luncheon at the Sheraton Inner Harbor Hotel. In 1998, he was inducted into the Towson University Hall of Fame.

Preceded by Luke Appling	Baltimore Orioles third-base coach 1964–1977	Succeeded by Cal Ripken, Sr.
