= Bobby Shantz =

American baseball player (born 1925)

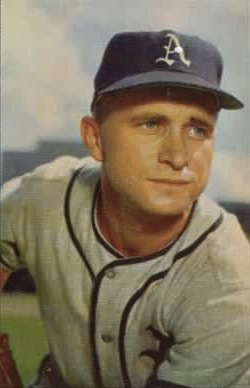
- Shantz in 1953
- Pitcher
- Born: September 26, 1925 (age 101); Pottstown, Pennsylvania, U.S.
- Batted: Right Threw: Left

MLB debut
- May 1, 1949, for the Philadelphia Athletics

Last MLB appearance
- September 29, 1964, for the Philadelphia Phillies

MLB statistics
- Win–loss record: 119–99
- Earned run average: 3.38
- Strikeouts: 1,072
- Stats at Baseball Reference

Teams
- Philadelphia / Kansas City Athletics (1949–1956); New York Yankees (1957–1960); Pittsburgh Pirates (1961); Houston Colt .45's (1962); St. Louis Cardinals (1962–1964); Chicago Cubs (1964); Philadelphia Phillies (1964)

Career highlights and awards
- 3× All-Star (1951, 1952, 1957); World Series champion (1958); AL MVP (1952); 8× Gold Glove Award (1957–1964); AL wins leader (1952); MLB ERA leader (1957); Philadelphia Baseball Wall of Fame

Robert Clayton Shantz (born September 26, 1925) is an American former professional baseball left-handed pitcher. He played in Major League Baseball (MLB) from 1949 through 1964, and won the 1952 American League Most Valuable Player Award as a member of the Philadelphia Athletics. A three-time All-Star, Shantz won eight consecutive Gold Glove Awards and won a World Series championship with the 1958 New York Yankees. As of 2026, he is the last living Philadelphia Athletics player, the oldest living MLB MVP, and the last surviving MLB player who played in the 1940s.

He also played for the Pittsburgh Pirates, Houston Colt .45s, St. Louis Cardinals, Chicago Cubs, and the Philadelphia Phillies. Shantz began his career as a starting pitcher, but about halfway through he converted to a competent relief pitcher. In 1951, he added the knuckleball to his repertoire. Standing 5 ft 6 in (1.68 m), Shantz had a career record of 119 games won, 99 games lost, and an earned run average (ERA) of 3.38.

== Early life ==
Shantz was born on September 26, 1925, in Pottstown, Pennsylvania, to Wilmer A. and Ruth E. (Ebert) Shantz. His father was a semi-pro baseball player in the 1920s. During the Great Depression, Wilmer found the means to take Shantz and his younger brother Bill (Wilmer Jr.) to baseball games in Philadelphia. Shantz attended Pottstown High School, where he starred in multiple sports (including at least baseball, basketball and swimming), graduating in 1943. Shantz played semi-pro and sandlot baseball during and after high school, with his father's encouragement. Shantz also worked at an aircraft plant and then at a saw company in Philadelphia. He was drafted during World War II and assigned to serve in the Philippines toward the war's end. He played baseball on military teams, some of which included major league players.

== Professional career ==
=== Philadelphia/Kansas City Athletics ===
He signed with the Philadelphia Athletics as a free agent in 1948. He played one year of minor league baseball, for the Class A Lincoln A's in 1948. He was a starting pitcher, with an 18–7 win–loss record, 2.82 earned run average (ERA), 212 strikeouts in 214 innings pitched, 19 complete games, and two shutouts. He had a 3.85 strikeout-to-walk ratio.

Shantz made his MLB debut on May 1, 1949, with the Athletics, pitching .2 innings in relief. He pitched in 33 games for the 1949 A's, starting seven; with a 6–8 record and 3.40 ERA. The next season he started 23 of the 36 games in which he appeared, with an 8–14 record and 4.61 ERA.

Shantz was a control pitcher who relied on keeping hitters off balance with a variety of curveballs, fastballs and changeups. As his pitching career progressed, Shantz learned the value of studying each batter's unique weaknesses in determining how to pitch to them. In 1951, Shantz added a knuckleball to his pitching repertoire. His record improved to 18–10, with 25 starts and a 3.94 ERA on a team that only won 70 games.

In 1952, Shantz led the American League (AL) in wins (24) and won the AL Most Valuable Player Award. In the process, he led the A's to a 79–75 record and fourth-place finish in the American League, their last winning season in Philadelphia. His 9.4 WAR (wins above replacement) led all major league players, and his 8.8 WAR for pitchers led all major league pitchers. His 2.48 ERA was fourth best among all major league pitchers.

On August 5, 1952, 35,000 A's fans came to Shibe Park to watch Shantz win his 20th game, their highest game attendance in four years. It was the earliest an A's pitcher had won 20 games since Hall of Fame pitcher Lefty Grove in 1931. The financially distressed A's averaged nearly 18,000 attendees per game when Shantz pitched that year, but fewer than 8,000 for their other games.

In a late September 1952 game, Shantz's left wrist was broken by a pitch thrown by Walt Masterson of the Senators. The following season, Shantz injured his shoulder in a game against the Boston Red Sox. Shantz saw only limited action for the rest of 1953 and pitched only eight innings in 1954. At the end of the 1954 season the Athletics were sold and moved to Kansas City for the 1955 season. In his first season in Kansas City, Shantz started 17 of the 23 games in which he pitched, with a 5–10 record and 5.10 ERA. Shantz's brother Bill played on the Philadelphia A's in 1954 and the Kansas City A's in 1955.

In late April 1956, Shantz pulled a back muscle. Based on Shantz's injury history, A's manager Lou Boudreau concluded it was best to use Shantz as a late inning relief pitcher. Shantz pitched 43 of his 45 games in relief that season, pitching 101.1 innings. He had a 2–7 record, nine saves and a 4.35 ERA.

=== New York Yankees ===
On February 19, 1957, the Athletics traded Shantz, Art Ditmar, Wayne Belardi, Jack McMahan, and a player to be named later to the New York Yankees for Rip Coleman, Milt Graff, Billy Hunter, Mickey McDermott, Irv Noren, Tom Morgan, and a player to be named later. The Yankees sent Jack Urban to the Athletics and the Athletics sent Curt Roberts and future Gold Glove third baseman Clete Boyer to the Yankees to complete the trade. In 1957, the Yankees used Shantz as a starter again in 21 of his 30 appearances. Shantz led the league and all major league pitchers in ERA in his first year with the Yankees (2.45), and had an 11–5 record with five saves.

After the 1957 season, however, he was never a regular starting pitcher for the remainder of his career. He started 13 games out of 36 appearances for the 1958 World Champion Yankees, going 7–6 with a 3.36 ERA. He pitched almost entirely in relief the next season with a 7–3 record and 2.38 ERA for the 1959 Yankees; and entirely in relief with a 5–4 record and 11 saves with a 2.79 ERA for the 1960 Yankees. Shantz appeared in relief three games each in the 1957 and 1960 World Series with the Casey Stengel managed New York Yankees.

=== Later years (1961–1964) ===
Shantz was selected in the December 1960 MLB expansion draft by the Washington Senators. Two days later, the Senators traded Shantz to the Pittsburgh Pirates for Bennie Daniels, Harry Bright, and R. C. Stevens. The Houston Colt .45s selected Shantz from the Pirates in the 1961 MLB expansion draft. As the Colt .45s Opening Day starting pitcher during their inaugural season of 1962, he became the first pitcher in franchise history, and tossed a complete game as Houston defeated the Chicago Cubs, 11–2. On May 7, 1962, the Colt .45s traded Shantz to the St. Louis Cardinals for John Anderson and Carl Warwick. In 1962, he had a career-low ERA of 1.95 in 78.1 innings pitched (1.31 with Houston, and 2.18 with the Cardinals).

He had another good year with the Cardinals in 1963, going 6–4 with 11 saves and a 2.61 ERA. On June 15, 1964, the Cardinals traded Shantz, recent NL wins leader Ernie Broglio, and Doug Clemens to the Chicago Cubs for then undistinguished but future Baseball Hall of Fame outfielder Lou Brock, Jack Spring, and Paul Toth. The centerpiece of the trade was Brock for Broglio, and it is considered one of the most lopsided trades in MLB history (in the Cardinals favor). The Cubs sold Shantz's contract rights to the Philadelphia Phillies in August 1964. He retired after the 1964 season.

Shantz pitched well for the 1964 Phillies over the final month-and-a-half of his 16-year career, only giving up eight runs in 32 innings pitched (2.25 ERA), and played an important role in the team's pursuit of the National League pennant. Among other things, in a September 17 game against the Los Angeles Dodgers, he came into the game with one out in the first inning, and pitched 7.2 innings of 3-hit baseball to defeat future Hall of Fame pitcher Don Drysdale. However, he also played a part in that team's notorious collapse at the end of the season.

On September 20, the Phillies were in first place with a 6 1/2-game lead in the National League with just 12 games remaining in the season. The Phillies then lost 10 consecutive games and the pennant. On September 26 (Shantz's 39th birthday), manager Gene Mauch brought Shantz in to relieve in the eighth inning with the Phillies holding a 4–3 lead in a game against the Milwaukee Braves. Mauch sent the left-handed Shantz back out in the ninth inning, and he loaded the bases after two singles and an error. Braves' rookie Rico Carty then hit a bases-loaded triple off of Shantz, making him the losing pitcher in what was the last appearance of Shantz's career. One of the questions raised about the Phillies collapse was why Mauch used the left-handed Shantz against the right-handed Carty (who had a .330 batting average that season).

In his 16-year major league career, he was 119–99, with a 3.38 ERA and 34.6 WAR. Shantz recorded a .195 batting average (107-for-548) with 60 runs, 20 doubles, one home run, 46 runs batted in and 47 walks. Defensively, he posted a .976 fielding percentage which was 19 points higher than the league average at his position. Regarding batters who gave him fits, in a later in life interview during a "roast" given for him by Philadelphia baseball writers, Shantz said that while Mickey Mantle and Ted Williams were tough outs, the batter who gave him the most career trouble was Roy Sievers. At the roast too he remarked that he was in awe at how fast pitchers throw today and not just the fast ball but also hard on the arm breaking pitches.

== Legacy and honors ==
A highly skilled fielder, Shantz won eight consecutive Gold Glove Awards from 1957 to 1964 (American League, 1957–60; National League, 1961–64). In 1957, he was the inaugural Gold Glove winner as a pitcher, when only a single award was given for both leagues. Jim Kaat, who won 16 consecutive Gold Glove Awards as a pitcher, considered Shantz to be the superior fielder. Kaat has stated that if the award had existed for Shantz's entire career he would have won as many, or more, than Kaat. In 1956, A's manager Lou Boudreau, a Hall of Fame shortstop who had been an excellent fielder, called Shantz the best fielding pitcher in baseball. Bobby Richardson, who was Shantz's teammate on the Yankees and won five consecutive American League Gold Glove Awards as a second baseman, said Shantz could probably field better than most infielders.

Shantz also was selected for the All-Star Game in 1951, 1952 and 1957. In the fifth and final inning of the 1952 All Star Game, the left–handed Shantz exhibited his distinctive sidearm delivery and sharp curve and control and struck out three consecutive National League hitters, Whitey Lockman, Jackie Robinson and Stan Musial.

Shantz played in the major leagues at 5 ft 6 in (1.68 m) or 5 ft 6.5 in (1.69 m) 139 lb. (63 kg). In his best season (1952), Shantz was the smallest MLB pitcher. His size was frequently mentioned in describing him as a player, with such phrases as "little Bobby Shantz", "bitsy Bobby Shantz", "mighty little southpaw", "mighty mite" or worse commonly used when describing Shantz. More insulting language about his size was used by other teams’ bench jockeys to taunt Shantz, but he did not let this affect him. Other than Shantz, no pitcher 5 ft 6 in or shorter has pitched over 200 innings in a season during his lifetime, which he did three times. After his stellar 1952 All-Star Game performance, and league leading 14–3 record, one sports editor said Shantz was the best pitcher of such short stature ever, with the only challenger being the 5 ft 8 in (1.73 m) Dickey Kerr of the early 1920s Chicago White Sox.

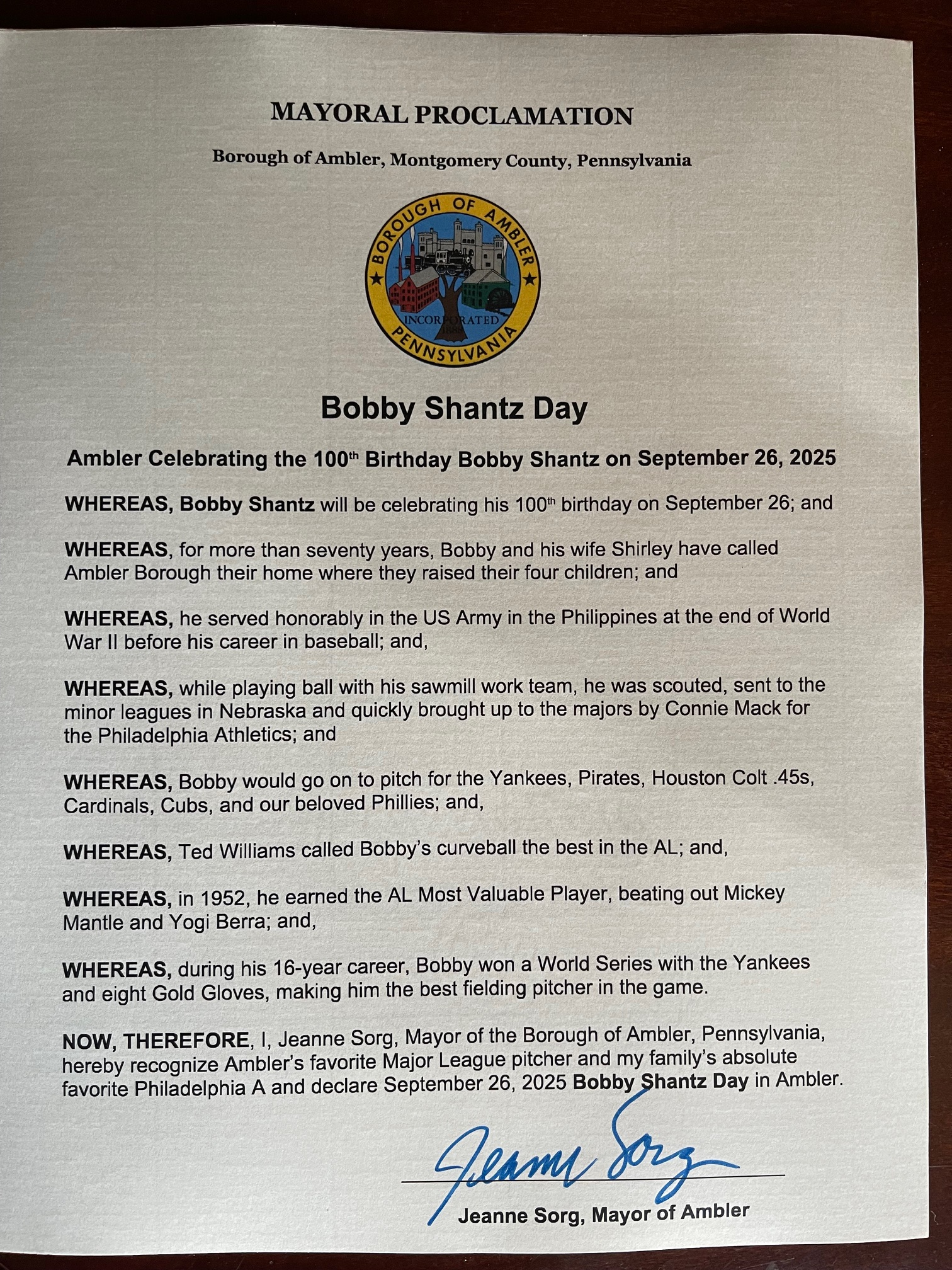
Ambler Mayoral Proclamation of Bobby Shantz Day, September 26, 2025

Ambler, Pennsylvania proclaimed September 26, 2025, as "Bobby Shantz Day" in honor of Shantz's 100th birthday.

== Personal life ==
His younger brother Billy Shantz also became a professional baseball player, at catcher, and later a coach with the New York Yankees. Even after becoming professional baseball players, both sons kept in regular contact with their father to let him know how they were doing. Shantz's father Wilmer died while attending a 1964 exhibition basketball game in which Shantz was playing.

Shantz was married to Shirley Vogel, and they had four children, Bobby, born in 1954, followed by Kathy, Teddy, and Danny, born in 1965. Shirley died on May 11, 2026, following 76 years of marriage.

Shantz became the last surviving player who played for the Philadelphia Athletics after the death of Bill Harrington in 2022, and the last living player to debut in MLB in the 1940s after the death of Tommy Brown in 2025. Shantz is the last living player to have played for long-time MLB manager Connie Mack. Following the death of Art Schallock on March 6, 2025, Shantz became the second-oldest living MLB player after Bill Greason, and the oldest living World Series champion.

According to an interview with The Athletic, as of August 2025, Shantz lives in Ambler, Pennsylvania with his wife Shirley. They own a dog named Jake. He formerly operated a bowling alley and a dairy bar in nearby Chalfont, Pennsylvania, with his former Athletics teammate, Joe Astroth. In his younger years, he enjoyed playing golf. Health limitations include a bad hip, and he can no longer travel, but overall, he "feels good". He frequently watches baseball on television.

== See also ==
- List of Major League Baseball annual ERA leaders
- List of Major League Baseball annual wins leaders
- Sporting News Pitcher of the Year Award
- List of centenarians (Major League Baseball players)
- List of centenarians (sportspeople)
