= List of Gold Glove Award winners at pitcher =

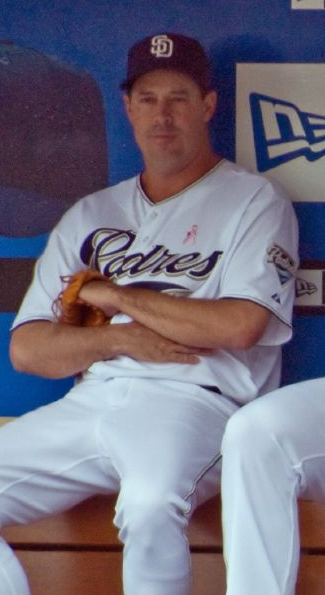
Greg Maddux has won 18 Gold Gloves, the most in Major League Baseball history.

The Gold Glove Award is the award given annually to the Major League Baseball players judged to have exhibited superior individual fielding performances at each fielding position in both the National League (NL) and the American League (AL), as voted by the managers and coaches in each league. Managers are not permitted to vote for their own players. Eighteen Gold Gloves are awarded each year (with the exception of 1957, 1985, 2007 and 2018), one at each of the nine positions in each league. In 1957, the baseball glove manufacturer Rawlings created the Gold Glove Award to commemorate the best fielding performance at each position. The award was created from a glove made from gold lamé-tanned leather and affixed to a walnut base. Initially, only one Gold Glove per position was awarded to the top fielder at each position in the entire league; however, separate awards were given for the National and American Leagues beginning in 1958.

Greg Maddux has won the most Gold Glove Awards among all players, including pitchers, in Major League Baseball history. He won 18 awards, all in the National League; his streak of wins was consecutive from 1990 through 2002 until interrupted by Mike Hampton in 2003. Maddux won five more awards from 2004 to 2008, after which he retired. Jim Kaat is second and held the record for most wins (16) until he was displaced by Maddux in 2007. He won 14 awards in the American League and 2 in the National League; his 16 consecutive awards is a record among winners. Bob Gibson won nine Gold Gloves with the St. Louis Cardinals, and the inaugural winner Bobby Shantz won four awards in each league, for a total of eight. Mark Langston and Mike Mussina are tied for the fifth-highest total, with seven wins each. Zack Greinke currently ranks seventh with six wins. Gold Glove winners at pitcher who have been inducted into the Baseball Hall of Fame include Gibson, Kaat, Mussina, Maddux, Steve Carlton, Jim Palmer, and Phil Niekro.

Maddux made the most putouts in a season (39) three times in his career (1990, 1991, and 1993). The American League leader is Frank Lary, who made 32 putouts for the Detroit Tigers in 1961. Kaat is the leader in assists; he made 72 with the Minnesota Twins in 1962. The National League leader, Maddux, trails him by one (71 assists in 1996). Many pitchers have posted errorless seasons and 1.000 fielding percentages in their winning seasons; Mussina is the leader with four perfect seasons in the field. Ron Guidry (1982–1984) and Mussina (1996–1998) both accomplished the feat in three consecutive seasons. The most double plays turned by a winning pitcher is nine, accomplished by Maddux in 2006. Four pitchers have also thrown no wild pitches in a winning season: Maddux (1997, 2006), Kaat (1975), Shantz (1961, 1962), and Kenny Rogers (2005). In contrast, the most wild pitches in a winning season is 18, by the knuckleballing Niekro. The fewest balks in a winning season is zero, achieved many times, but Maddux accomplished the feat the most time in his wins (12 balk-free seasons in 18 years). The most balks in a winning season is five, by Mike Norris in 1981, Orel Hershiser in 1988 and Mark Buehrle in 2010. Buehrle picked off the most runners from the pitcher's mound in a winning season, with 11 in 2010; Clayton Kershaw leads the National League with 9 pickoffs in 2011. Rogers posted both the highest (100% in 2002) and lowest (0% in 2005) caught stealing percentage in a winning season; the latter also tied with Dallas Keuchel (2015 and 2018) in the American League. Shantz' 1961 season tied Rogers' 0% mark for lowest percentage caught, and Greinke leads the National League (80% caught).

== Key ==
Year	Links to the corresponding Major League Baseball season
PO	Putout
A	Assist
E	Error
DP	Double play
FPct	Fielding percentage
WP	Wild pitches
BK	Balks
CS%	Caught stealing percentage^{[a]}
PkO	Pickoffs
!	Indicates a partially/possibly incomplete statistical record
* or **	Winner of the most Gold Glove Awards at his position (** indicates tie)
†	Member of the National Baseball Hall of Fame and Museum

== American League winners ==
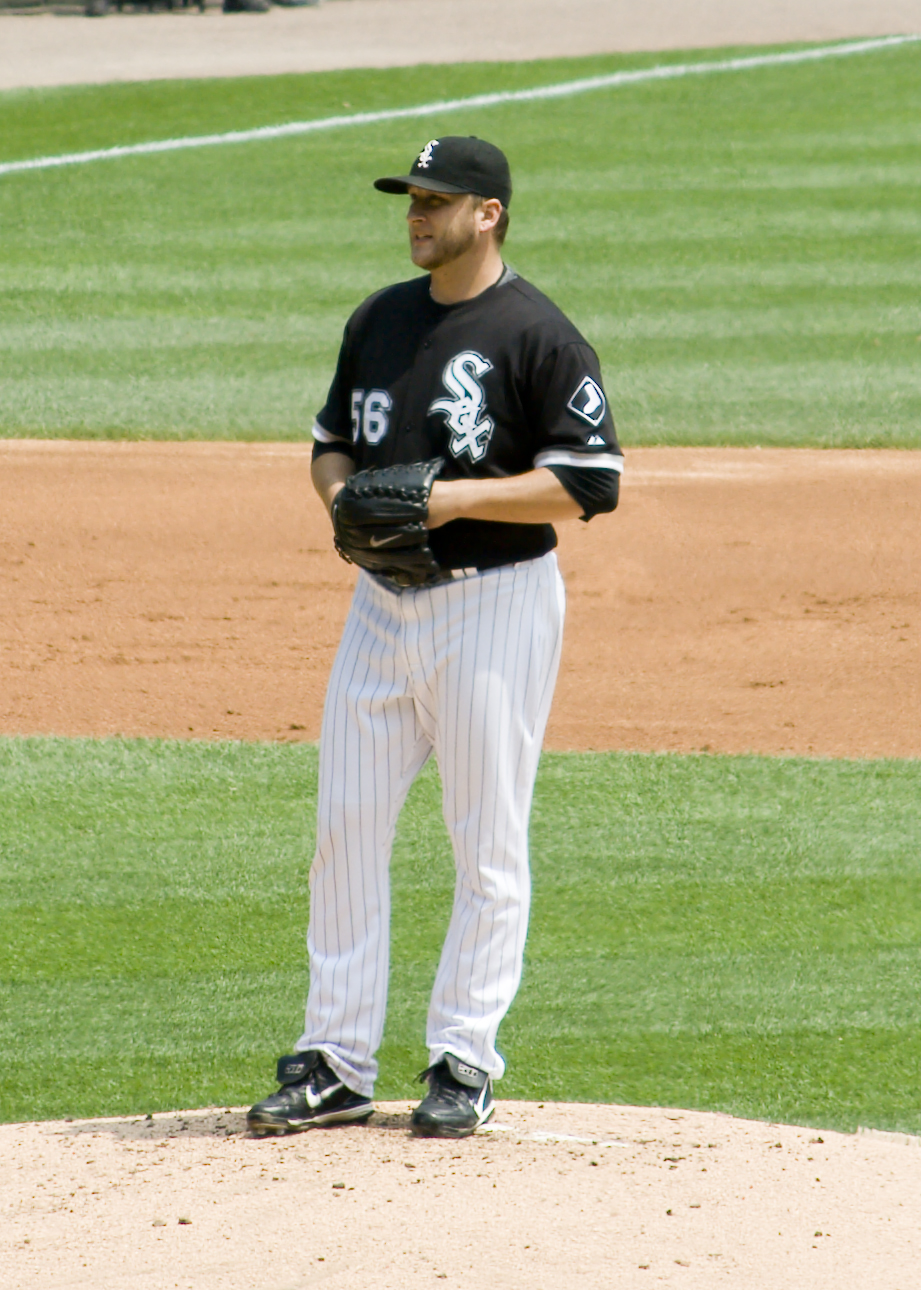
Mark Buehrle (AL Gold Glove winner, 2009–2011, NL Gold Glove winner, 2012)

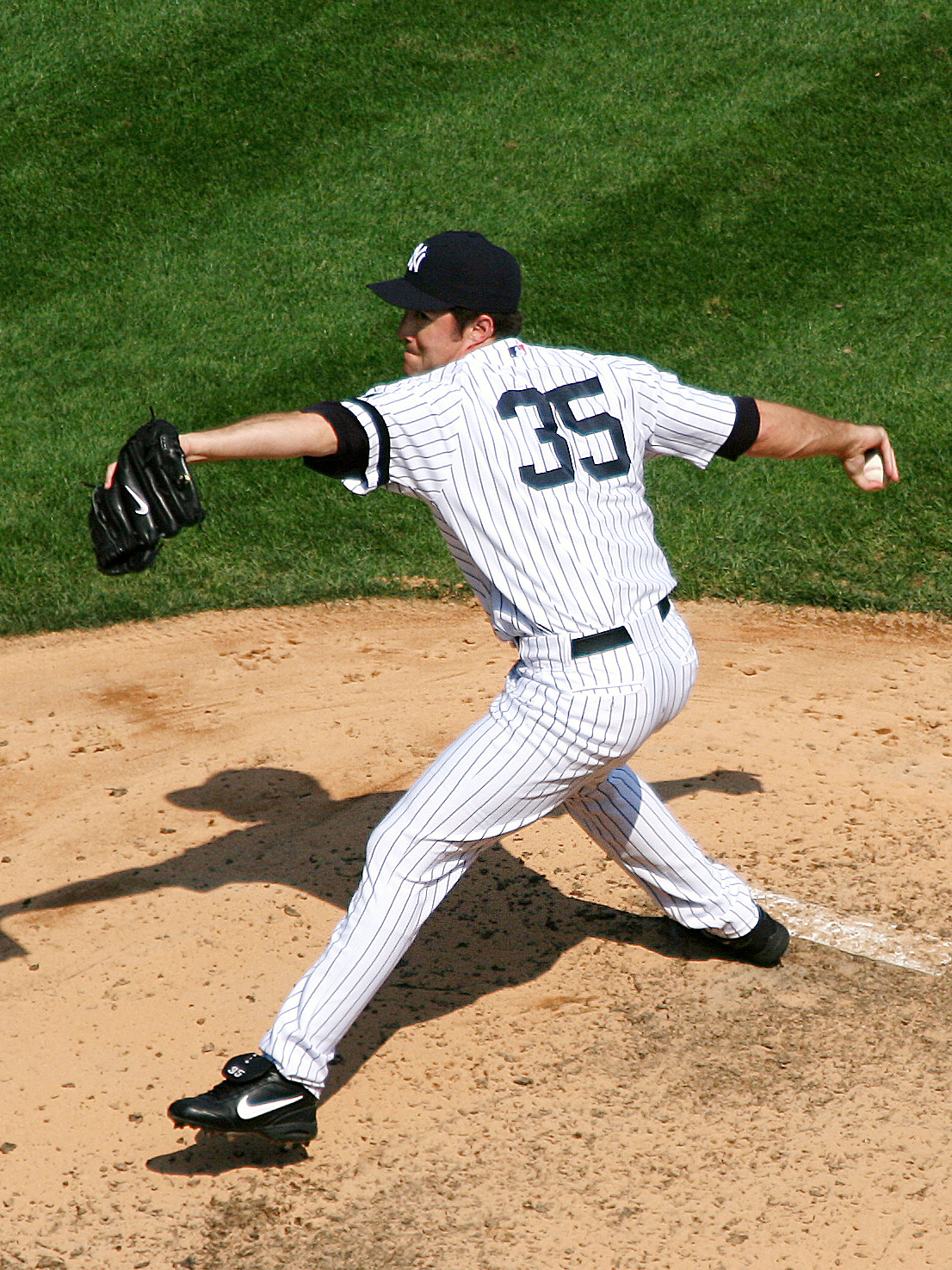
Mike Mussina (AL Gold Glove winner, 1996–1999, 2001, 2003, 2008)

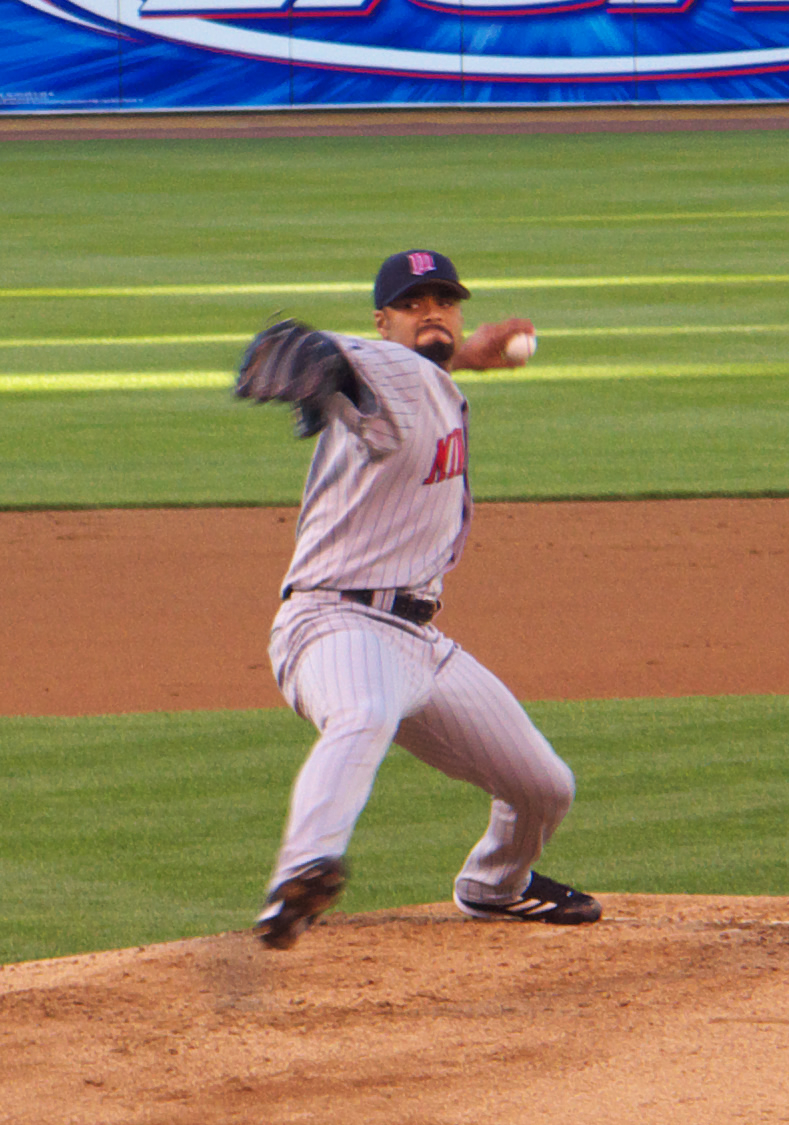
Johan Santana (AL Gold Glove winner, 2007)

Year	Player	Team	PO	A	E	DP	FPct	WP	BK	CS%	PkO	Ref
1957^{[b]}	Bobby Shantz	New York Yankees	14	57	1	8	.986	3	1	40%	2	
1958	Bobby Shantz	New York Yankees	6	35	0	4	1.000	3	1	67%	0	
1959	Bobby Shantz	New York Yankees	8	20	2	1	.933	3	0	50%	1	
1960	Bobby Shantz	New York Yankees	4	13	0	1	1.000	3	0	50%	0	
1961	Frank Lary	Detroit Tigers	32	55	1	5	.989	6	0	64%	2	
1962	Jim Kaat^{†}	Minnesota Twins	16	72	3	6	.967	13	0	75%	1	
1963	Jim Kaat^{†}	Minnesota Twins	19	43	1	5	.984	6	0	20%	2	
1964	Jim Kaat^{†}	Minnesota Twins	16	48	5	6	.928	13	1	39%	1	
1965	Jim Kaat^{†}	Minnesota Twins	15	64	6	3	.929	3	0	27%	0	
1966	Jim Kaat^{†}	Minnesota Twins	19	46	3	5	.956	12	0	38%	3	
1967	Jim Kaat^{†}	Minnesota Twins	13	46	3	0	.952	9	1	30%	0	
1968	Jim Kaat^{†}	Minnesota Twins	10	31	1	0	.976	5	0	67%	1	
1969	Jim Kaat^{†}	Minnesota Twins	9	29	8	4	.826	9	0	15%	0	
1970	Jim Kaat^{†}	Minnesota Twins	15	43	4	5	.935	11	0	20%	1	
1971	Jim Kaat^{†}	Minnesota Twins	13	41	1	4	.982	8	0	22%	2	
1972	Jim Kaat^{†}	Minnesota Twins	5	19	2	0	.923	2	0	33%	3	
1973	Jim Kaat^{†}	Minnesota Twins; Chicago White Sox	10	26	1	2	.973	3	0	20%	0	
1974	Jim Kaat^{†}	Chicago White Sox	14	33	2	3	.959	4	0	69%	3	
1975	Jim Kaat^{†}	Chicago White Sox	15	39	1	2	.982	0	2	75%	2	
1976	Jim Palmer^{†}	Baltimore Orioles	27	49	1	2	.987	5	0	31%	3	
1977	Jim Palmer^{†}	Baltimore Orioles	20	48	2	5	.971	7	0	67%	1	
1978	Jim Palmer^{†}	Baltimore Orioles	27	43	2	5	.972	5	1	49%	1	
1979	Jim Palmer^{†}	Baltimore Orioles	10	23	0	1	1.000	1	0	40%	0	
1980	Mike Norris	Oakland Athletics	25	52	3	3	.963	9	4	43%	1	
1981	Mike Norris	Oakland Athletics	16	25	1	0	.976	14	5	27%	1	
1982	Ron Guidry	New York Yankees	7	19	0	1	1.000	6	1	40%	1	
1983	Ron Guidry	New York Yankees	9	33	0	2	1.000	4	2	34%	4	
1984	Ron Guidry	New York Yankees	8	24	0	3	1.000	1	0	45%	1	
1985	Ron Guidry	New York Yankees	6	34	1	3	.976	3	1	59%	0	
1986	Ron Guidry	New York Yankees	9	21	1	0	.968	3	0	28%	1	
1987	Mark Langston	Seattle Mariners	8	41	2	3	.961	9	2	41%	5	
1988	Mark Langston	Seattle Mariners	11	45	4	6	.933	7	4	48%	5	
1989	Bret Saberhagen	Kansas City Royals	21	36	4	1	.934	8	1	64%	3	
1990	Mike Boddicker	Boston Red Sox	29	27	2	6	.966	10	0	43%	1	
1991	Mark Langston	California Angels	15	34	3	2	.942	6	0	60%	4	
1992	Mark Langston	California Angels	7	41	3	1	.941	5	0	32%	5	
1993	Mark Langston	California Angels	10	47	2	4	.966	10	2	55%	10	
1994	Mark Langston	California Angels	3	27	2	1	.938	6	0	50%	9	
1995	Mark Langston	California Angels	2	43	3	2	.938	5	1	75%	4	
1996	Mike Mussina^{†}	Baltimore Orioles	14	34	0	3	1.000	3	0	57%	0	
1997	Mike Mussina^{†}	Baltimore Orioles	18	25	0	0	1.000	5	0	40%	0	
1998	Mike Mussina^{†}	Baltimore Orioles	12	38	0	1	1.000	10	0	26%	0	
1999	Mike Mussina^{†}	Baltimore Orioles	14	46	1	3	.984	2	0	56%	0	
2000	Kenny Rogers	Texas Rangers	18	46	2	6	.970	1	1	55%	9	
2001	Mike Mussina^{†}	New York Yankees	18	25	1	4	.977	6	0	59%	2	
2002	Kenny Rogers	Texas Rangers	22	40	3	5	.954	5	1	100%	1	
2003	Mike Mussina^{†}	New York Yankees	14	35	0	2	1.000	4	0	63%	0	
2004	Kenny Rogers	Texas Rangers	16	49	1	2	.985	2	1	71%	6	
2005	Kenny Rogers	Texas Rangers	18	47	1	7	.985	0	0	0%	0	
2006	Kenny Rogers	Detroit Tigers	14	38	5	2	.912	5	0	86%	0	
2007	Johan Santana	Minnesota Twins	14	26	0	1	1.000	7	1	45%	4	
2008	Mike Mussina^{†}	New York Yankees	18	23	1	4	.976	4	0	37%	0	
2009	Mark Buehrle	Chicago White Sox	13	41	1	5	.982	2	1	50%	8	
2010	Mark Buehrle	Chicago White Sox	4	46	0	4	1.000	3	5	50%	11	
2011	Mark Buehrle	Chicago White Sox	15	40	1	4	.982	1	0	70%	6	
2012	Jeremy Hellickson	Tampa Bay Rays	17	21	2	2	.950	5	0	30%	1	
2012	Jake Peavy	Chicago White Sox	14	22	1	3	.967	3	2	47%	1	
2013	R. A. Dickey	Toronto Blue Jays	11	40	2	1	.962	7	1	27%	2	
2014	Dallas Keuchel	Houston Astros	18	47	1	3	.985	7	0	25%	0	
2015	Dallas Keuchel	Houston Astros	18	53	1	1	.986	9	0	0%	0	
2016	Dallas Keuchel	Houston Astros	5	27	0	2	1.000	9	0	50%	0	
2017	Marcus Stroman	Toronto Blue Jays	9	37	1	6	.979	3	1	33%	1	
2018	Dallas Keuchel	Houston Astros	14	27	0	1	1.000	9	0	0%	0	
2019	Mike Leake^{[d]}	Seattle Mariners	11	17	1	2	.966	2	0	56%	0	
2020	Griffin Canning	Los Angeles Angels	7	8	1	1	.938	5	0	56%	2	
2021	Dallas Keuchel	Chicago White Sox	7	41	1	3	.980	5	0	67%	1	
2022	Shane Bieber	Cleveland Guardians	15	16	1	1	.969	5	1	31%	0	
2023	José Berríos	Toronto Blue Jays	15	26	2	2	.953	4	1	25%	2	
2024	Seth Lugo	Kansas City Royals	14	29	0	3	1.000	4	0	50%	0	
2025	Max Fried	New York Yankees	10	39	4	1	.925	8	1	46%	7	
2026	Tanner Bibee	Cleveland Guardians	11	18	3	1	.906	4	0	11%	4	

== National League winners ==
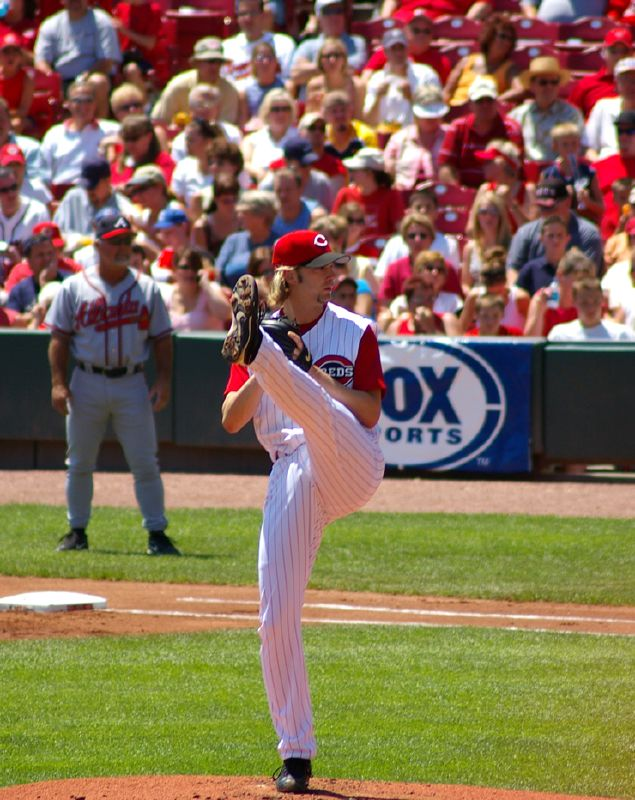
Bronson Arroyo (NL Gold Glove winner, 2010)

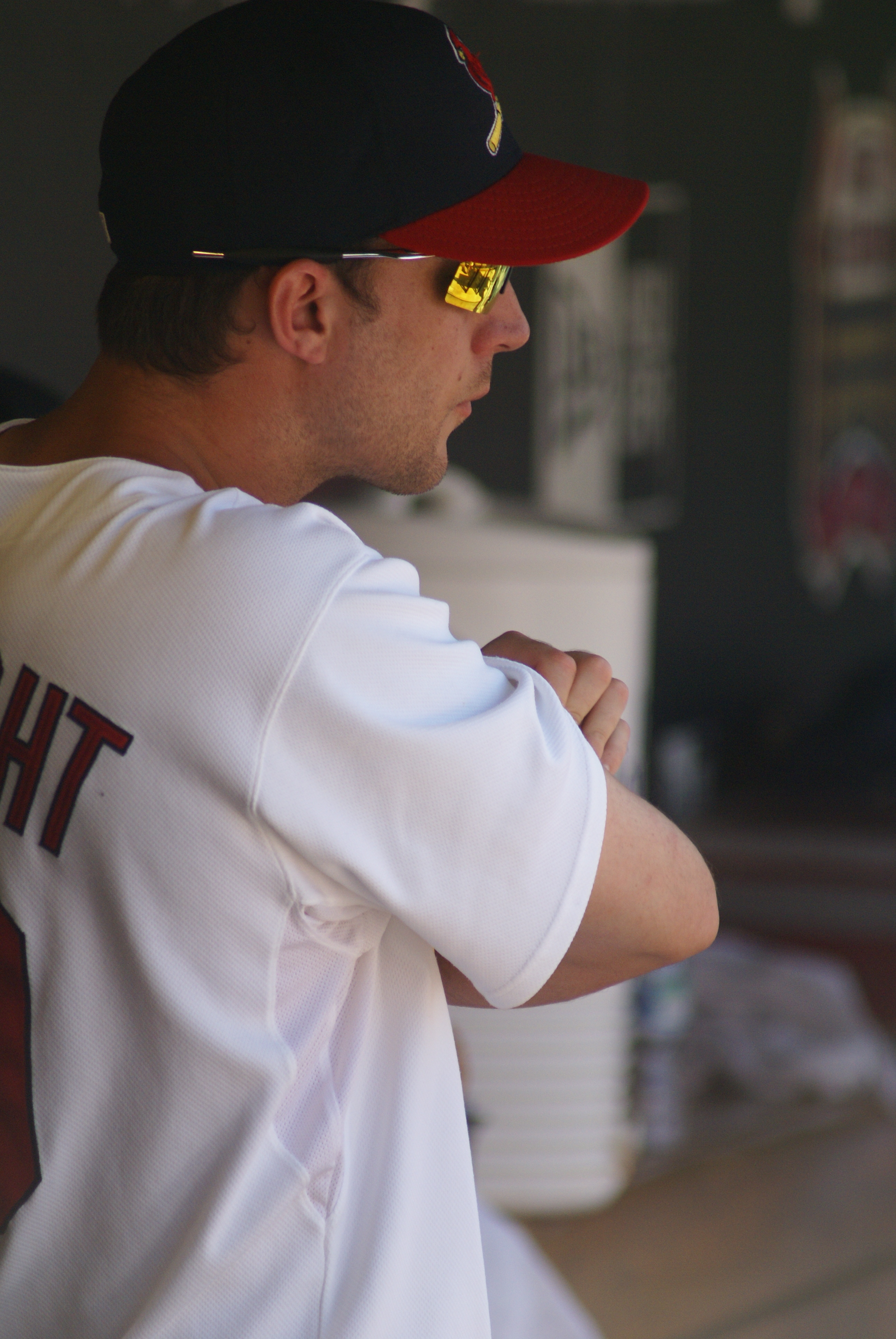
Adam Wainwright (NL Gold Glove winner, 2009, 2013)

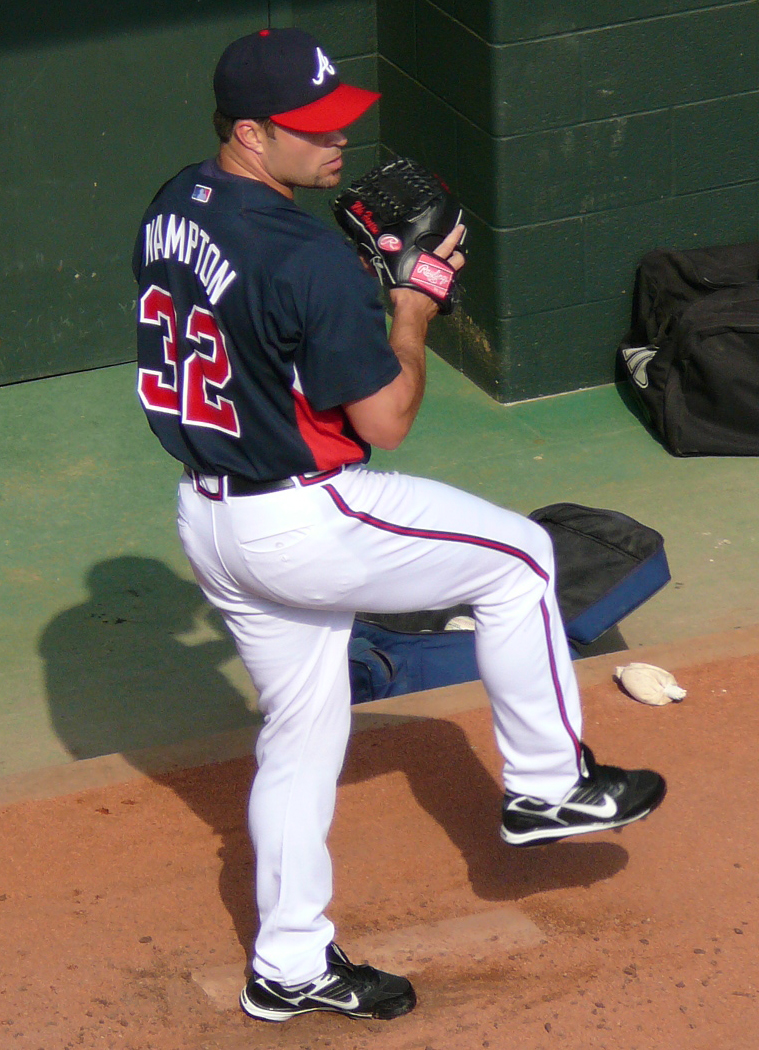
Mike Hampton (NL Gold Glove winner, 2003)

Year	Player	Team	PO	A	E	DP	FPct	WP	BK	CS%	PkO	Ref
1957^{[c]}	Bobby Shantz	New York Yankees (AL)	14	57	1	8	.986	3	1	40%	2	
1958	Harvey Haddix	Cincinnati Reds	10	15	2	0	.926	6	0	25%	0	
1959	Harvey Haddix	Pittsburgh Pirates	10	26	1	1	.973	1	0	33%	0^{!}	
1960	Harvey Haddix	Pittsburgh Pirates	8	35	0	3	1.000	4	0	25%	0^{!}	
1961	Bobby Shantz	Pittsburgh Pirates	13	18	0	2	1.000	0	0	0%	0	
1962	Bobby Shantz	Houston Colt .45's St. Louis Cardinals	10	25	1	2	.972	0	0	50%	1	
1963	Bobby Shantz	St. Louis Cardinals	9	22	1	2	.969	5	0	25%	0	
1964	Bobby Shantz	St. Louis Cardinals; Chicago Cubs; Philadelphia Phillies	6	28	1	0	.971	2	0	50%	0	
1965	Bob Gibson^{†}	St. Louis Cardinals	27	33	3	1	.952	8	1	20%	0	
1966	Bob Gibson^{†}	St. Louis Cardinals	26	28	2	4	.964	12	0	50%	0	
1967	Bob Gibson^{†}	St. Louis Cardinals	19	23	0	0	1.000	3	1	67%	1	
1968	Bob Gibson^{†}	St. Louis Cardinals	21	28	1	2	.980	4	0	45%	0	
1969	Bob Gibson^{†}	St. Louis Cardinals	21	32	3	5	.946	4	2	33%	0	
1970	Bob Gibson^{†}	St. Louis Cardinals	22	32	4	3	.931	5	1	23%	0	
1971	Bob Gibson^{†}	St. Louis Cardinals	10	39	3	1	.942	10	0	23%	0	
1972	Bob Gibson^{†}	St. Louis Cardinals	12	46	1	3	.983	10	2	36%	0	
1973	Bob Gibson^{†}	St. Louis Cardinals	11	24	2	2	.946	6	1	40%	0	
1974	Andy Messersmith	Los Angeles Dodgers	18	44	9	3	.873	6	3	46%	3	
1975	Andy Messersmith	Los Angeles Dodgers	11	43	5	1	.915	8	0	33%	2	
1976	Jim Kaat^{†}	Philadelphia Phillies	18	19	2	3	.949	1	0	33%	0	
1977	Jim Kaat^{†}	Philadelphia Phillies	7	19	3	1	.897	2	0	50%	1	
1978	Phil Niekro^{†}	Atlanta Braves	17	65	2	4	.976	11	3	26%	4	
1979	Phil Niekro^{†}	Atlanta Braves	31	56	1	3	.989	18	4	22%	2	
1980	Phil Niekro^{†}	Atlanta Braves	18	40	1	6	.983	9	1	43%	2	
1981	Steve Carlton^{†}	Philadelphia Phillies	3	22	0	0	1.000	9	4	60%	5	
1982	Phil Niekro^{†}	Atlanta Braves	18	38	1	4	.982	4	1	48%	3	
1983	Phil Niekro^{†}	Atlanta Braves	15	27	2	6	.955	6	3	29%	2	
1984	Joaquín Andújar	St. Louis Cardinals	15	54	3	2	.958	6	4	22%	5	
1985	Rick Reuschel	Pittsburgh Pirates	24	40	0	2	1.000	4	0	47%	1	
1986	Fernando Valenzuela	Los Angeles Dodgers	29	47	1	2	.987	13	0	42%	1	
1987	Rick Reuschel	Pittsburgh Pirates; San Francisco Giants	25	38	2	2	.969	7	0	67%	1	
1988	Orel Hershiser	Los Angeles Dodgers	32	60	6	6	.939	6	5	43%	5	
1989	Ron Darling	New York Mets	15	37	4	5	.929	12	4	30%	2	
1990	Greg Maddux*^{†}	Chicago Cubs	39	55	0	6	1.000	3	3	24%	1	
1991	Greg Maddux*^{†}	Chicago Cubs	39	50	2	5	.978	6	3	22%	5	
1992	Greg Maddux*^{†}	Chicago Cubs	30	64	3	1	.969	5	0	33%	1	
1993	Greg Maddux*^{†}	Atlanta Braves	39	59	7	5	.933	5	1	18%	3	
1994	Greg Maddux*^{†}	Atlanta Braves	20	38	4	4	.935	3	1	21%	2	
1995	Greg Maddux*^{†}	Atlanta Braves	18	53	0	3	1.000	1	0	19%	2	
1996	Greg Maddux*^{†}	Atlanta Braves	37	71	1	6	.991	4	0	19%	0	
1997	Greg Maddux*^{†}	Atlanta Braves	16	49	3	3	.956	0	0	29%	1	
1998	Greg Maddux*^{†}	Atlanta Braves	31	63	4	5	.959	4	0	28%	0	
1999	Greg Maddux*^{†}	Atlanta Braves	29	58	4	3	.956	1	0	32%	1	
2000	Greg Maddux*^{†}	Atlanta Braves	25	68	2	5	.979	1	2	18%	0	
2001	Greg Maddux*^{†}	Atlanta Braves	19	54	1	3	.986	2	0	37%	2	
2002	Greg Maddux*^{†}	Atlanta Braves	21	48	1	3	.986	1	0	14%	2	
2003	Mike Hampton	Atlanta Braves	12	41	3	4	.946	10	1	67%	1	
2004	Greg Maddux*^{†}	Chicago Cubs	21	55	1	3	.987	2	0	32%	0	
2005	Greg Maddux*^{†}	Chicago Cubs	19	49	3	6	.958	8	0	20%	0	
2006	Greg Maddux*^{†}	Chicago Cubs; Los Angeles Dodgers	14	52	0	9	1.000	0	0	19%	1	
2007	Greg Maddux*^{†}	San Diego Padres	19	51	1	5	.986	5	0	5%	1	
2008	Greg Maddux*^{†}	San Diego Padres; Los Angeles Dodgers	17	57	3	4	.961	2	2	17%	0	
2009	Adam Wainwright	St. Louis Cardinals	27	29	0	0	1.000	7	0	29%	0	
2010	Bronson Arroyo	Cincinnati Reds	18	31	0	5	1.000	1	1	25%	0	
2011	Clayton Kershaw	Los Angeles Dodgers	9	38	0	2	1.000	5	1	39%	9	
2012	Mark Buehrle	Miami Marlins	13	47	0	5	1.000	2	0	38%	4	
2013	Adam Wainwright	St. Louis Cardinals	25	36	0	6	1.000	5	0	50%	0	
2014	Zack Greinke	Los Angeles Dodgers	28	30	1	8	.983	12	0	25%	0	
2015	Zack Greinke	Los Angeles Dodgers	19	41	2	2	.968	7	0	46%	2	
2016	Zack Greinke	Arizona Diamondbacks	20	28	1	4	.980	1	0	57%	0	
2017	Zack Greinke	Arizona Diamondbacks	26	30	0	5	1.000	12	0	64%	1	
2018	Zack Greinke	Arizona Diamondbacks	27	30	0	0	1.000	4	0	71%	0	
2019	Zack Greinke^{[e]}	Arizona Diamondbacks	26	25	1	8	.981	1	0	80%	2	
2020	Max Fried	Atlanta Braves	1	15	1	1	.941	1	1	25%	4	
2021	Max Fried	Atlanta Braves	8	37	1	3	.978	7	0	27%	6	
2022	Max Fried	Atlanta Braves	15	26	1	0	.976	9	0	57%	3	
2023	Zack Wheeler	Philadelphia Phillies	16	15	1	1	.969	1	0	57%	0	
2024	Chris Sale	Atlanta Braves	9	22	0	1	1.000	4	1	25%	2	
2025	Logan Webb	San Francisco Giants	7	34	1	3	.976	2	0	44%	2	
2026	Nolan McLean	New York Mets	16	24	3	2	.930	2	0	25%	3	

== Footnotes ==
- ^{a} "Caught stealing percentage" is calculated as CS/SBA, where CS is the number of baserunners caught stealing and SBA is stolen bases attempted (stolen bases + caught stealing).
- ^{b} ^{c} In 1957, Gold Gloves were given to the top fielders in Major League Baseball, instead of separate awards for the National and American Leagues; therefore, the winners are the same in each table.
- ^{d} Statistics only count Leake's time in the American League. Leake pitched 22 games with the Mariners before being traded to the National League's Arizona Diamondbacks on July 31, 2019.
- ^{e} Statistics only count Greinke's time in the National League. Greinke pitched 23 games with the Diamondbacks before being traded to the American League's Houston Astros on July 31, 2019.

== See also ==
- Gold Glove-winning batterymates
