= Billy Shantz =

American baseball player and manager (1927-1993)

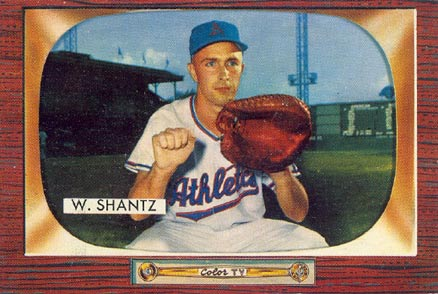
- Catcher
- Born: July 31, 1927; Pottstown, Pennsylvania, U.S.
- Died: December 13, 1993 (aged 66); Lauderhill, Florida, U.S.
- Batted: Right Threw: Right

MLB debut
- April 13, 1954, for the Philadelphia Athletics

Last MLB appearance
- June 29, 1960, for the New York Yankees

MLB statistics
- Batting average: .257
- Home runs: 2
- Runs batted in: 29
- Stats at Baseball Reference

Teams
- Philadelphia / Kansas City Athletics (1954–1955); New York Yankees (1960)

Wilmer Ebert Shantz (July 31, 1927 – December 13, 1993) was an American professional baseball catcher and manager. He appeared in 131 Major League Baseball (MLB) games, 130 of them for the 1954–55 Philadelphia/Kansas City Athletics and one for the 1960 New York Yankees. His older brother, Bobby, a left-handed pitcher, played in the Majors for 16 seasons (1949–64) and was the Most Valuable Player in the American League in 1952. In contrast to his diminutive brother Bobby, who stood 5 feet 6 inches (1.68 m) tall, Billy Shantz was listed as 6 feet 1 inch (1.85 m) tall and weighed 160 pounds (73 kg). He batted and threw right-handed.

Born in Pottstown, Pennsylvania, Shantz began his pro career in 1948 in the Athletics' farm system and played continuously through 1962, including his two full seasons in MLB. He was the second-string catcher and a teammate of his elder brother's during the Athletics' last season in Philadelphia and their first year in Kansas City, hitting .256 and .258 and collecting two home runs among his 98 total hits. In 1959, he followed Bobby to the Yankees' organization, where he played at the Triple-A level and appeared in one big-league game, on June 29, 1960, against the Athletics, as a defensive replacement. In relief of Yogi Berra, he caught the final inning of Jim Coates' 10–0 shutout victory and did not have a plate appearance.

Shantz served as a player-manager in Panama.

Billy Shantz played 1,181 minor league games over 16 total seasons, including a stint as a playing coach in 1966. He also managed in the Yankee farm system for four seasons (1963; 1967–69). He died at age 66 in Lauderhill, Florida.
