= 1952 World Series =

1952 Major League Baseball championship series

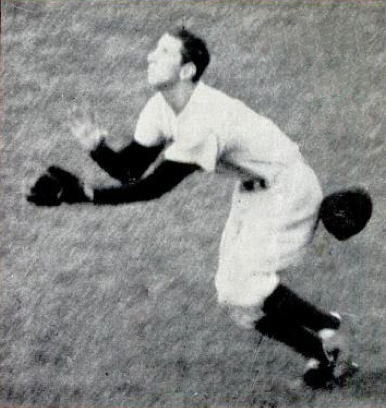
- Billy Martin making a game-saving catch in Game 7 of the 1952 World Series.
| Team (Wins) | Managers | Season |
|---|---|---|
| New York Yankees (4) | Casey Stengel | 95–59, .617, GA: 2 |
| Brooklyn Dodgers (3) | Chuck Dressen | 96–57, .627, GA: 4 1/2 |
- Dates: October 1–7
- Venue(s): Ebbets Field (Brooklyn); Yankee Stadium (New York)
- Umpires: Babe Pinelli (NL), Art Passarella (AL), Larry Goetz (NL), Bill McKinley (AL), Dusty Boggess (NL: outfield only), Jim Honochick (AL: outfield only)
- Hall of Famers: Yankees: Casey Stengel (manager); Yogi Berra; Mickey Mantle; Johnny Mize; Phil Rizzuto; Dodgers: Roy Campanella; Gil Hodges; Pee Wee Reese; Jackie Robinson; Duke Snider

Broadcast
- Television: NBC
- TV announcers: Red Barber and Mel Allen
- Radio: Mutual
- Radio announcers: Al Helfer and Jack Brickhouse

The 1952 World Series featured the three-time defending champion New York Yankees beating the Brooklyn Dodgers in seven games. The Yankees won their fourth consecutive title, tying the mark they set in 1936–1939 under manager Joe McCarthy, and Casey Stengel became the second manager in Major League history with four consecutive World Series championships. This was the Yankees' 15th World Series championship win and the third time they defeated the Dodgers in six years.

In Game 7, the Yankees' second baseman Billy Martin made a great catch, preserving the Yankees' two-run lead. Also, the home run hit by Mickey Mantle during the eighth inning of Game 6 was significant because it was the first of his record 18 career World Series home runs.

== Summary ==
AL New York Yankees (4) vs. NL Brooklyn Dodgers (3)

| Game | Date | Score | Location | Time | Attendance |
|---|---|---|---|---|---|
| 1 | October 1 | New York Yankees – 2, Brooklyn Dodgers – 4 | Ebbets Field | 2:21 | 34,861 |
| 2 | October 2 | New York Yankees – 7, Brooklyn Dodgers – 1 | Ebbets Field | 2:47 | 33,792 |
| 3 | October 3 | Brooklyn Dodgers – 5, New York Yankees – 3 | Yankee Stadium | 2:56 | 66,698 |
| 4 | October 4 | Brooklyn Dodgers – 0, New York Yankees – 2 | Yankee Stadium | 2:33 | 71,787 |
| 5 | October 5 | Brooklyn Dodgers – 6, New York Yankees – 5 (11) | Yankee Stadium | 3:00 | 70,536 |
| 6 | October 6 | New York Yankees – 3, Brooklyn Dodgers – 2 | Ebbets Field | 2:56 | 30,037 |
| 7 | October 7 | New York Yankees – 4, Brooklyn Dodgers – 2 | Ebbets Field | 2:54 | 33,195 |

== Matchups ==
In 1952 the Dodgers, led by manager Chuck Dressen, paced the NL in runs scored (775), home runs (153) and stolen bases (90). Duke Snider, Jackie Robinson and George Shuba batted over .300, while Roy Campanella (97) and Gil Hodges (102) paced the team in RBIs. The Dodgers had no dominant pitchers with Carl Erskine (206 2/3) the lone pitcher with over 200 innings and rookie Joe Black leading the team with 15 wins. Manager Dressen used 14 starting pitchers on the year, but as a unit, the pitchers combined to finish second in the NL in team ERA. Defensively, the Dodgers led the NL with a .982 fielding percentage, and Campanella gunned down 29 of 52 (56%) would-be base stealers.

The Yankees, led by the effusive Casey Stengel, recovered from the retirement of Joe DiMaggio, and the loss of Bobby Brown, Jerry Coleman and Tom Morgan to the service. The Yankees matched the Dodgers in hitting as they finished first or second in the AL in runs scored, home runs, batting average, and slugging percentage. Mickey Mantle had a breakout season leading the Yankees in batting (.311), and slugging (.530). Yogi Berra led the Yanks in runs (97), HRs (30) and RBIs (98). The Yankees had a pitching staff that led the AL in ERA (3.14). Allie Reynolds led the team with 20 wins and led the league with 2.08 ERA. Casey Stengel rotated his pitchers all year with seven having at least 12 starts, but none working more than 35 games. Defensive standout Phil Rizzuto led AL shortstops with 458 assists and made only 19 errors.

=== Game 1 ===
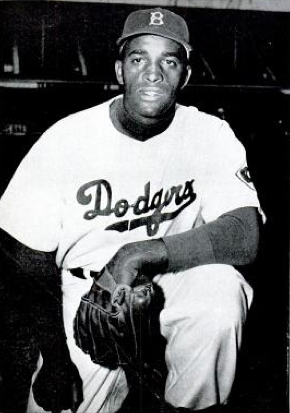
Joe Black

October 1, 1952 1:00 pm (ET) at Ebbets Field in Brooklyn, New York
| Team | 1 | 2 | 3 | 4 | 5 | 6 | 7 | 8 | 9 | R | H | E |
|---|---|---|---|---|---|---|---|---|---|---|---|---|
| New York | 0 | 0 | 1 | 0 | 0 | 0 | 0 | 1 | 0 | 2 | 6 | 2 |
| Brooklyn | 0 | 1 | 0 | 0 | 0 | 2 | 0 | 1 | X | 4 | 6 | 0 |
WP: Joe Black (1–0) LP: Allie Reynolds (0–1); Home runs: NYY: Gil McDougald (1); BRO: Jackie Robinson (1), Duke Snider (1), Pee Wee Reese (1)

Joe Black pitched a complete game and became the first African-American pitcher to win a World Series game. Jackie Robinson's lead off home run in the second off of Allie Reynolds put the Dodgers up 1–0, but Gil McDougald tied the game with a lead off home run of his own in the third. Duke Snider's two-run home run in the sixth put the Dodgers back in front 3–1. The Yankees cut the lead to 3–2 on a Gene Woodling triple and Hank Bauer sacrifice fly in the top of the eighth, but Pee Wee Reese gave the Dodgers that run back with a two-out home run in the eighth off Ray Scarborough as Brooklyn won 4–2 to take a 1–0 series lead.

=== Game 2 ===
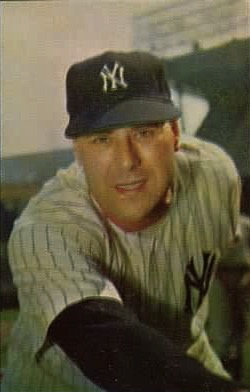
Vic Raschi

October 2, 1952 1:00 pm (ET) at Ebbets Field in Brooklyn, New York
| Team | 1 | 2 | 3 | 4 | 5 | 6 | 7 | 8 | 9 | R | H | E |
|---|---|---|---|---|---|---|---|---|---|---|---|---|
| New York | 0 | 0 | 0 | 1 | 1 | 5 | 0 | 0 | 0 | 7 | 10 | 0 |
| Brooklyn | 0 | 0 | 1 | 0 | 0 | 0 | 0 | 0 | 0 | 1 | 3 | 1 |
WP: Vic Raschi (1–0) LP: Carl Erskine (0–1); Home runs: NYY: Billy Martin (1); BRO: None

Vic Raschi's complete-game three-hitter and nine strikeouts dominated this game. He was behind 1–0 after a Roy Campanella RBI single in the third, then in the fourth, the Yankees tied it when Mickey Mantle doubled, took third on a groundout and scored on a Yogi Berra sacrifice fly off Carl Erskine. Next inning, Gil McDougald drew a leadoff walk, stole second and scored on Billy Martin's single to put the Yankees up 2–1. A five-run Yankee sixth broke it open. Two singles and a walk loaded the bases before Billy Loes relieved Erskine and allowed an RBI groundout to Joe Collins, RBI single to McDougald, and three-run home run to Martin to put the Yankees up 7–1. The series was tied 1–1 shifting to the Bronx.

=== Game 3 ===
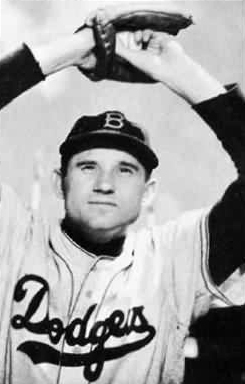
Preacher Roe

October 3, 1952 1:00 pm (ET) at Yankee Stadium in Bronx, New York
| Team | 1 | 2 | 3 | 4 | 5 | 6 | 7 | 8 | 9 | R | H | E |
|---|---|---|---|---|---|---|---|---|---|---|---|---|
| Brooklyn | 0 | 0 | 1 | 0 | 1 | 0 | 0 | 1 | 2 | 5 | 11 | 0 |
| New York | 0 | 1 | 0 | 0 | 0 | 0 | 0 | 1 | 1 | 3 | 6 | 2 |
WP: Preacher Roe (1–0) LP: Eddie Lopat (0–1); Home runs: BRO: None; NYY: Yogi Berra (1), Johnny Mize (1)

In Game 3, the Yankees struck first in the second on Eddie Lopat's RBI single with two on off Preacher Roe, but the Dodgers tied the game off Lopat in the third on Jackie Robinson's sacrifice fly with two on. In the fifth, Billy Cox singled, moved to second on a sacrifice bunt and scored on Pee Wee Reese's RBI single. In the eighth, after two leadoff singles, Andy Pafko's sacrifice fly made it 3–1 Dodgers. Yogi Berra's home run in the bottom of the inning cut the lead to 3–2, but in the ninth, Reese and Robinson singled, then (after Lopat was relieved by Tom Gorman) did a double steal. A passed ball allowed both to score to make it 5–2 Dodgers. Johnny Mize's home run in the bottom of the inning made it 5–3 Dodgers, but Roe retired the next two men to end the game and give the Dodgers a 2–1 series lead.

=== Game 4 ===
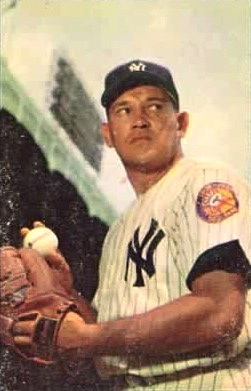
Allie Reynolds

October 4, 1952 1:00 pm (ET) at Yankee Stadium in Bronx, New York
| Team | 1 | 2 | 3 | 4 | 5 | 6 | 7 | 8 | 9 | R | H | E |
|---|---|---|---|---|---|---|---|---|---|---|---|---|
| Brooklyn | 0 | 0 | 0 | 0 | 0 | 0 | 0 | 0 | 0 | 0 | 4 | 1 |
| New York | 0 | 0 | 0 | 1 | 0 | 0 | 0 | 1 | X | 2 | 4 | 1 |
WP: Allie Reynolds (1–1) LP: Joe Black (1–1); Home runs: BRO: None; NYY: Johnny Mize (2)

In Game 4, the score was 1–0 in the eighth, a Johnny Mize home run in the fourth off Joe Black being the difference, when Dodgers reliever Johnny Rutherford came into the game. The first batter he faced was Mickey Mantle, who tripled to deep left-center, then kept coming home when the throw to third got away, scoring a key insurance run for the Yankees. Both sides got just four hits in the contest. Allie Reynolds pitched a complete-game shutout as the Yankees' 2–0 win tied the series at two games apiece.

=== Game 5 ===
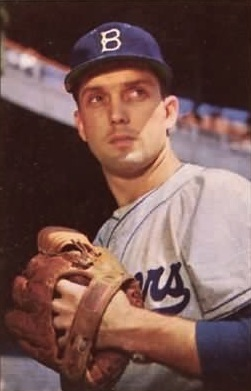
Carl Erskine

October 5, 1952 2:00 pm (ET) at Yankee Stadium in Bronx, New York
| Team | 1 | 2 | 3 | 4 | 5 | 6 | 7 | 8 | 9 | 10 | 11 | R | H | E |
|---|---|---|---|---|---|---|---|---|---|---|---|---|---|---|
| Brooklyn | 0 | 1 | 0 | 0 | 3 | 0 | 1 | 0 | 0 | 0 | 1 | 6 | 10 | 0 |
| New York | 0 | 0 | 0 | 0 | 5 | 0 | 0 | 0 | 0 | 0 | 0 | 5 | 5 | 1 |
WP: Carl Erskine (1–1) LP: Johnny Sain (0–1); Home runs: BRO: Duke Snider (2); NYY: Johnny Mize (3)

The Dodgers struck first in the second off Ewell Blackwell on Andy Pafko's RBI single with two on. In the fourth, with runners on second and third, Pee Wee Reese's sacrifice fly made it 2–0 Dodgers, then Duke Snider's two-run home run extended their lead to 4–0. Carl Erskine pitched four shutout innings before the Yankees torched him in the fifth. After a walk and single, Irv Noren's RBI single and Gil McDougald's forceout scored a run each. After a single and pop out, Johnny Mize's three-run home run put the Yankees ahead 5–4. In the seventh, Billy Cox singled, moved to second on a sacrifice bunt, and scored on Snider's RBI single, tying the game off Johnny Sain. The game went into extra innings and in the top of the 11th, Billy Cox got his third hit of the game, moved up on a Pee Wee Reese hit and scored on Duke Snider's double off reliever Johnny Sain for what turned out to be the winning run. Erskine pitched all 11 innings for Brooklyn, retiring the last 19 batters he faced, closing it out by retiring future Hall of Famers Mickey Mantle, Johnny Mize and Yogi Berra 1-2-3. The Dodgers were one win away from a championship as the series returned to Brooklyn.

=== Game 6 ===
October 6, 1952 1:00 pm (ET) at Ebbets Field in Brooklyn, New York
| Team | 1 | 2 | 3 | 4 | 5 | 6 | 7 | 8 | 9 | R | H | E |
|---|---|---|---|---|---|---|---|---|---|---|---|---|
| New York | 0 | 0 | 0 | 0 | 0 | 0 | 2 | 1 | 0 | 3 | 9 | 0 |
| Brooklyn | 0 | 0 | 0 | 0 | 0 | 1 | 0 | 1 | 0 | 2 | 8 | 1 |
WP: Vic Raschi (2–0) LP: Billy Loes (0–1) Sv: Allie Reynolds (1); Home runs: NYY: Yogi Berra (2), Mickey Mantle (1); BRO: Duke Snider 2 (4)

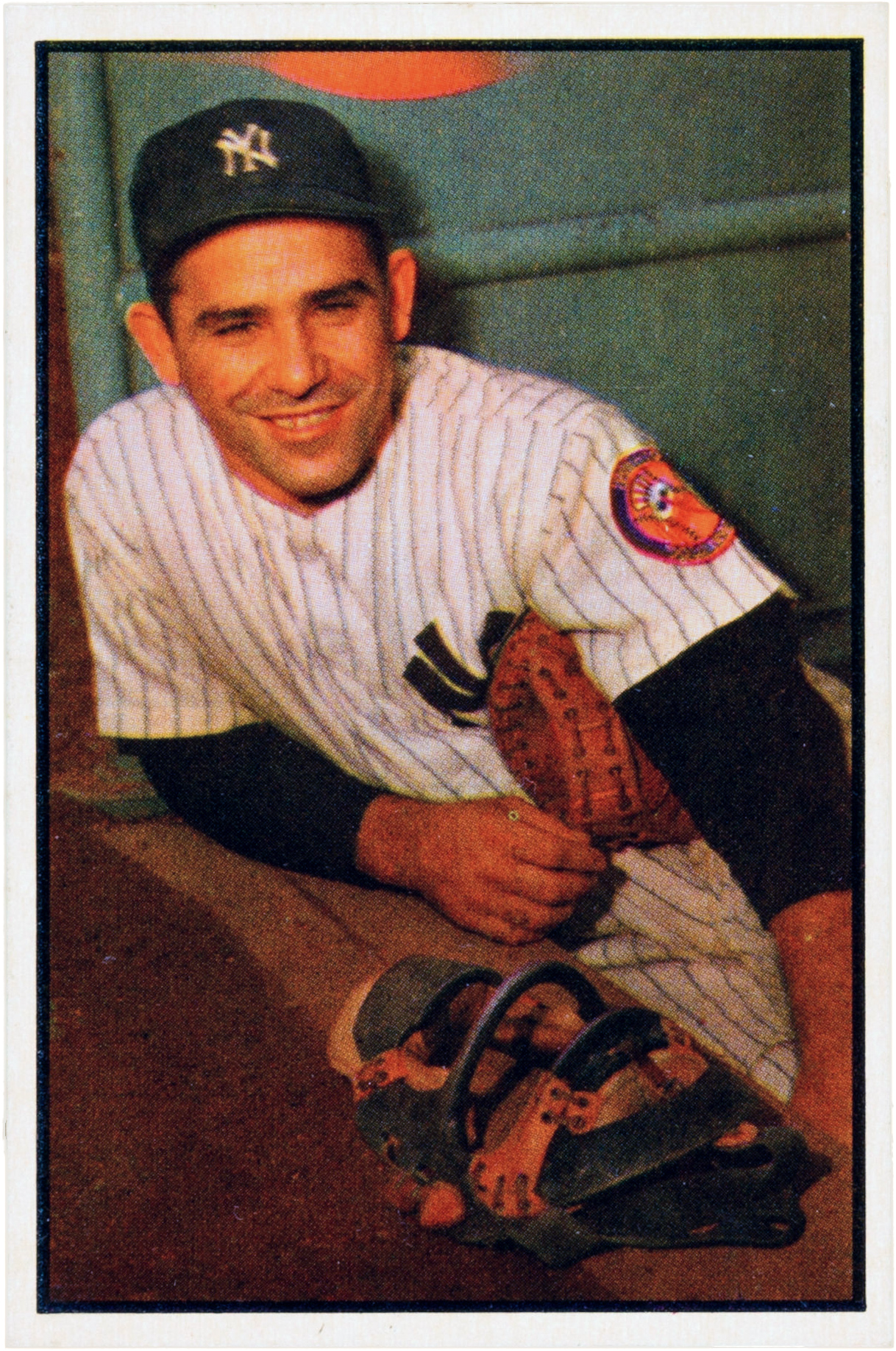
Yogi Berra

In Game 6, with a 3–2 Series lead and the final two at Ebbets Field, the Dodgers looked to chase away the demons of 1951. Billy Loes (13–8) faced Vic Raschi (16–6). Dodgers Manager Chuck Dressen made a curious lineup change with George Shuba batting fifth, replacing Andy Pafko. Dressen placed Roy Campanella in the sixth spot and left Gil Hodges to bat seventh.

In the Dodgers half of the first inning, with Duke Snider on second and Jackie Robinson on first, Shuba grounded out to Billy Martin to end the inning. In the Yankees fourth, Yogi Berra reached second base when Pee Wee Reese uncorked a wild throw on a double-play attempt, but the Yankees could not capitalize. In the fifth inning, the Dodgers turned a remarkable double play. Yankee Irv Noren led off with a single, followed by a Vic Raschi bunt. Gil Hodges picked up the bunt, turned and fired to Reese at second, who in lightning succession fired to Robinson covering first just in time to retire Raschi. In the Dodgers sixth, Snider sent Raschi's first pitch over the 40 feet (12 m) of screen in back of right field and onto Bedford Avenue for 1–0 lead. In the top of the seventh, Yogi Berra matched Snider's home run with one of his own, again onto Bedford Avenue. Gene Woodling followed with a single and Dodgers pitcher Billy Loes balked him to second. Raschi then made up for his bunt-turned-double-play by getting a hit, literally off Loes. The ball ricocheted off Loes and into right field bringing Woodling home for a 2–1 lead. In another curious move Dressen allowed pitcher Billy Loes to hit for himself in the seventh. Loes singled and promptly stole second. But Raschi struck out Billy Cox to end the inning. Mantle led off the Yankees eighth inning with the first of his 18 World Series home runs. Mantle's shot set a record for home runs by one team and for both teams in a single Series at 13. Snider continued the home run fest by launching another one in the bottom of the eighth. Jackie Robinson then sent left fielder Gene Woodling to the wall for an out and Shuba doubled to send Raschi to the showers. Allie Reynolds relieved and quickly ended the Dodgers eighth. Reynolds, known as "The Chief", again made quick work of the Dodgers in the ninth including striking out Rocky Nelson, who had pinch-hit for Hodges, preserving the 3–2 win.

=== Game 7 ===
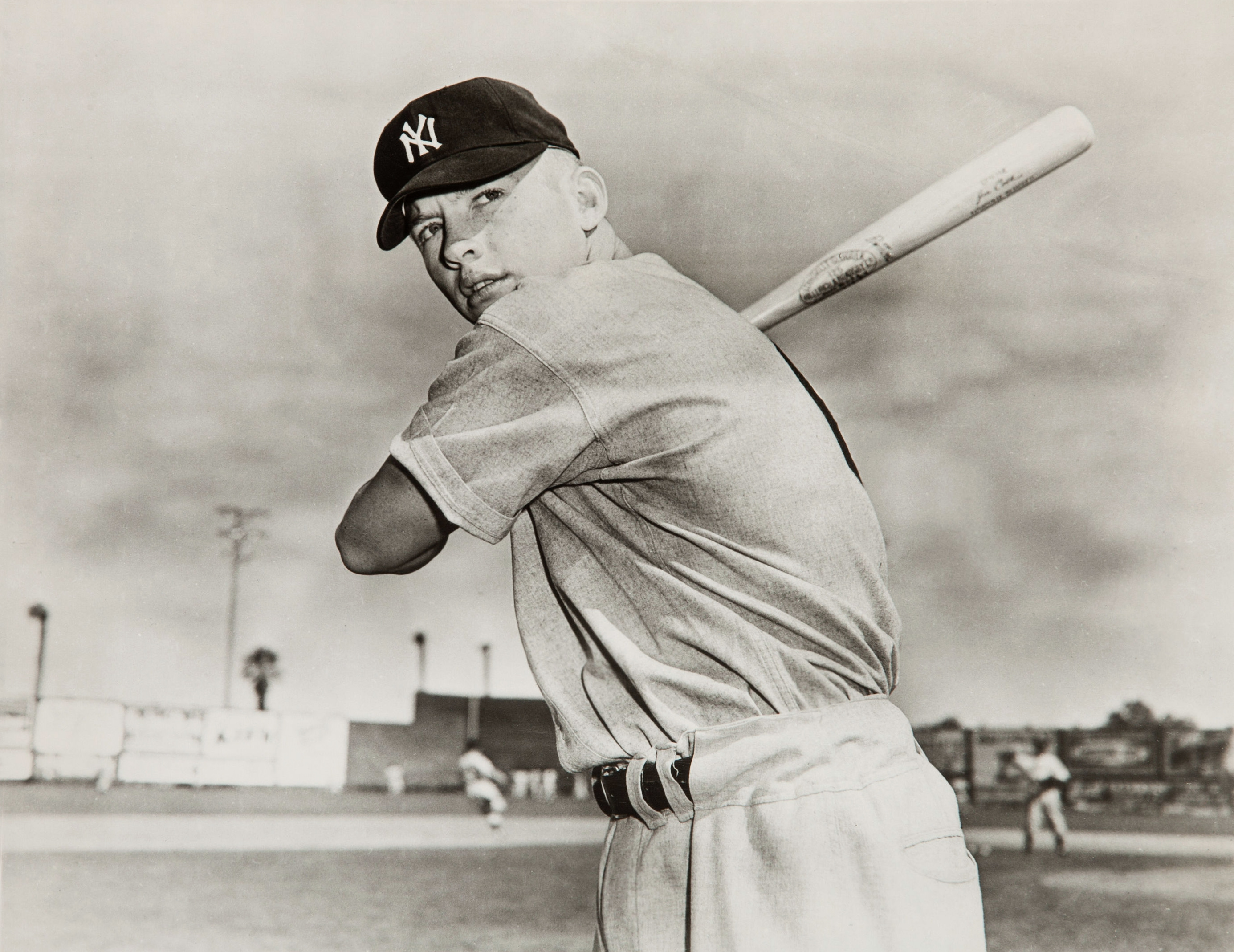
Mickey Mantle

October 7, 1952 1:00 pm (ET) at Ebbets Field in Brooklyn, New York
| Team | 1 | 2 | 3 | 4 | 5 | 6 | 7 | 8 | 9 | R | H | E |
|---|---|---|---|---|---|---|---|---|---|---|---|---|
| New York | 0 | 0 | 0 | 1 | 1 | 1 | 1 | 0 | 0 | 4 | 10 | 4 |
| Brooklyn | 0 | 0 | 0 | 1 | 1 | 0 | 0 | 0 | 0 | 2 | 8 | 1 |
WP: Allie Reynolds (2–1) LP: Joe Black (1–2) Sv: Bob Kuzava (1); Home runs: NYY: Gene Woodling (1), Mickey Mantle (2); BRO: None

Game 7 pitted Joe Black (15–4) vs Eddie Lopat (10–5). Black, who came out of the Negro leagues and was not even on the Dodgers spring training roster, had already pitched a complete game win in Game 1 of the Series, pitched seven innings in a 2–0 loss in Game 4 and would be starting his third game in seven days. At that time there were no days off between games as both teams played in New York. For the Yankees, Billy Martin continued his solid play. Martin sat on the bench for most of the season's first two months and took over second base duties when Casey Stengel moved Gil McDougald from second to third base to replace military-bound Bobby Brown.

Phil Rizzuto led off the Yankees fourth with a double and Johnny Mize singled him home for a 1–0 lead. In the Dodgers fourth, a single by Duke Snider followed by two consecutive sacrifice attempts by Jackie Robinson and Roy Campanella, intended to move runners over, loaded the bases instead. Allie Reynolds replaced Lopat and retired Gil Hodges with a fly to left scoring Snider. Reynolds struck out George Shuba, then induced Carl Furillo to ground out, leaving Robinson at third and the game tied 1–1. In the fifth inning, Gene Woodling homered for the Yankees, and the Dodgers' Billy Cox doubled followed by a Pee Wee Reese single which tied the game at 2–2. Mickey Mantle demonstrated his penchant for coming up big in World Series play with a home run in the sixth inning and RBI single in the seventh (off Preacher Roe) to give the Bronx Bombers a 4–2 lead. The Brooklyn boys loaded the bases again in the seventh, when Vic Raschi walked Furillo, Cox singled and Reese walked. Stengel called on Bob Kuzava, who retired Snider, setting the stage for Billy Martin. With two out and the runners moving, Jackie Robinson popped-up to the right of the mound. Kuzava hesitated, looking to his fielders. Martin charged hard from his position deep at second and caught the ball off his shoetops, to end the inning and save as many as 3 runs. Kuzava then quickly put the Dodgers down in the eighth and ninth to give the Yankees their fourth consecutive World Championship.

The Yankees batted .216 and the Dodgers only .215 in this tightly contested series.

== Composite line score ==
1952 World Series (4–3): New York Yankees (A.L.) over Brooklyn Dodgers (N.L.)

| Team | 1 | 2 | 3 | 4 | 5 | 6 | 7 | 8 | 9 | 10 | 11 | R | H | E |
|---|---|---|---|---|---|---|---|---|---|---|---|---|---|---|
| New York Yankees | 0 | 1 | 1 | 3 | 7 | 6 | 3 | 4 | 1 | 0 | 0 | 26 | 50 | 10 |
| Brooklyn Dodgers | 0 | 2 | 2 | 1 | 5 | 3 | 1 | 3 | 2 | 0 | 1 | 20 | 50 | 4 |
Total attendance: 340,906 Average attendance: 48,701; Winning player's share: $5,983 Losing player's share: $4,201

== See also ==
- Dodgers–Yankees rivalry
- 1952 Japan Series
