= Clete Boyer =

American baseball player (1937–2007)

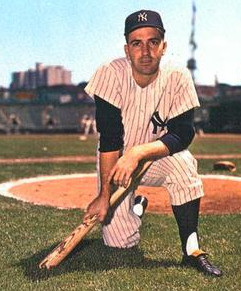
- Boyer, circa 1964–1966
- Third baseman
- Born: February 9, 1937; Cassville, Missouri, U.S.
- Died: June 4, 2007 (aged 70); Lawrenceville, Georgia, U.S.
- Batted: Right Threw: Right

Professional debut
- MLB: June 5, 1955, for the Kansas City Athletics
- NPB: April 11, 1972, for the Taiyo Whales

Last appearance
- MLB: May 23, 1971, for the Atlanta Braves
- NPB: October 16, 1975, for the Taiyo Whales

MLB statistics
- Batting average: .242
- Home runs: 162
- Runs batted in: 654

NPB statistics
- Batting average: .257
- Home runs: 71
- Runs batted in: 218
- Stats at Baseball Reference

Teams
- As player: Kansas City Athletics (1955–1957); New York Yankees (1959–1966); Atlanta Braves (1967–1971); Taiyo Whales (1972–1975); As coach: Oakland Athletics (1980–1985); New York Yankees (1988, 1992–1994)

Career highlights and awards
- 2× World Series champion (1961, 1962); Gold Glove Award (1969)

Cletis Leroy "Clete" Boyer (February 9, 1937 – June 4, 2007) was an American professional baseball third baseman—who occasionally played shortstop and second base—in Major League Baseball (MLB) for the Kansas City Athletics (1955–1957), New York Yankees (1959–1966), and Atlanta Braves (1967–1971). Boyer also spent four seasons with the Taiyō Whales of Nippon Professional Baseball (NPB). In his 16-year big league career, Boyer hit 162 home runs, with 654 runs batted in (RBI), and a .242 batting average, in 1,725 games played.

== Early life ==
Born in Cassville, Missouri, Boyer grew up in Alba, Missouri, as one of fourteen children. All seven boys in the family played professional baseball, with two of his older brothers also reaching the major leagues: Cloyd was a pitcher for the St. Louis Cardinals in the early 1950s, and Ken became an All-Star third baseman for the Cardinals.

== Early career ==
Boyer was originally scouted by the New York Yankees while he was still high school. But because the Yankees had already signed two other highly touted "bonus babies" (Frank Leja and Tommy Carroll) prior to scouting Boyer, the team decided that they could not sign him due to the rules in which bonus babies had to be on the Major League roster for their first two professional seasons. Knowing Boyer might become a potential star, the general manager of the Yankees, George Weiss contacted the general manager of the Kansas City Athletics, Parke Carroll, whom the Yankees had a friendly relationship with, to sign Boyer with the final intention of eventually acquiring him (by trade or sale of his contract). In 1955, Boyer broke into the major leagues as a utility infielder, at age 18. With no minor league experience, he played a total of 124 games for the Kansas City Athletics from 1955 to 1957.

On June 4, 1957, the Athletics traded Boyer to the Yankees to complete a deal that had been made prior to the start of the season. On February 19, the Athletics had dealt five players, including pitchers Bobby Shantz and Art Ditmar to the Yankees for seven players, most notably Irv Noren and Billy Hunter. The trade also involved three players to be named later, two going to the Yankees, and one to the Athletics. One of the players to be named was Boyer, fulfilling Weiss' original intent of making Boyer a Yankee.

== The Yankee years ==
After joining the Yankees, Boyer spent the better part of three seasons in their farm system until he was called up late in 1959. He became the Yankees' regular third baseman in 1960, beating out three others (including Gil McDougald, who had announced in spring training that this, his tenth season in the majors, would be his last) for the starting job. He batted .242 with 14 home runs and 46 RBIs as the Yankees won the pennant. However, he had a humbling moment in the first game of the World Series against the Pittsburgh Pirates. With two runners on base and the Yankees trailing 3–1 in the second inning, manager Casey Stengel, never confident in Boyer's hitting, replaced him with pinch-hitter Dale Long, who flied out to right fielder Roberto Clemente. The Yankees did not score in the inning and lost 6–4, ultimately losing the Series in Game 7 on Bill Mazeroski's home run off Ralph Terry in the bottom of the ninth. Boyer did not play in the Series again until Game Six.

After the Series, the Yankees fired Stengel. Ralph Houk replaced him as manager and had a confidence in Boyer which Stengel did not. Houk saw something special in Boyer's defensive prowess, and gave him the opportunity to play every day.

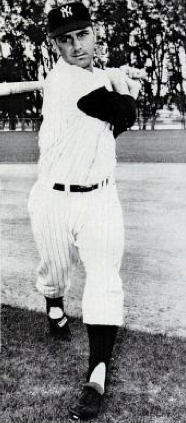
Boyer in 1962

The 1961 team (with Mickey Mantle, Whitey Ford, Roger Maris, Elston Howard, Yogi Berra and Moose Skowron), which defeated the Cincinnati Reds in the World Series, was considered by many as the best ever, with sluggers Mantle and Maris chasing Babe Ruth's 1927 record of 60 home runs (Maris eventually broke the record on the final day of a 162-game season) and Ford winning 25 games and losing four. Boyer batted only .224 during the regular season, but more than made up for it with his defense in an infield that also featured the double play duo of Tony Kubek at shortstop and Bobby Richardson at second base. In the first game of that World Series, Boyer displayed his defense by making two spectacular plays—one on a Gene Freese ground ball in the second inning, in which he backhanded the ball and threw Freese out from his knees, and another on a Dick Gernert ground ball in which he dove to his left and threw Gernert out, also from his knees.

Boyer's offensive numbers improved in 1962: career bests in batting average .272, home runs (18) and runs batted in (68). He also came within nine assists of the third base record of 405 set by Harlond Clift of the 1937 St. Louis Browns. Once again, the Yankees won the World Series, this time in seven games over the San Francisco Giants. In Game One of the Series, Boyer's seventh-inning home run off starter Billy O'Dell broke a 2–2 and gave the Yankees the lead for good; they won the game 6–2 in what would be the last of Whitey Ford's World Series-record 10 victories. The Series ended with Bobby Richardson catching Willie McCovey's line drive with runners on second and third. If just a few feet to either side, Richardson could not have gotten his hands on it, and the Giants would have scored two runs and won the Series. In 1963 Boyer batted .251 with 12 home runs and 54 RBIs as the Yankees won another pennant, however, they were swept in the World Series by the Los Angeles Dodgers, the first time this had ever been done to a Yankee team in a World Series. Dodger ace Sandy Koufax won the first and fourth games, striking out a series record 15 batters in the opener. Boyer was the only Yankee regular not to strike out against Koufax.

During each of Ralph Houk's first three seasons as Yankee manager (1961–1963), Boyer led all American League (AL) third basemen in putouts, assists, and double plays, finishing ahead of rival Brooks Robinson—yet Robinson, not Boyer, won the Gold Glove Award each year.

After the 1963 season, Houk was promoted to general manager and Yogi Berra replaced him as field manager. Early on, the 1964 team slumped under Berra, especially Boyer, who batted .218 on the season. As Berra's managing improved, the team improved with it and won its fifth straight pennant by one game over the Chicago White Sox and two over the third place Baltimore Orioles. The Yankees faced the St. Louis Cardinals in the World Series with Clete playing against his brother Ken. The Yankees lost in seven games, but not before Ken and Clete became the first brothers to hit home runs on opposing teams in a World Series game. In the 7th inning of that seventh game, Ken homered off Yankee pitcher Steve Hamilton and exchanged nods with Clete. Clete returned the favor in the 9th after homering off Cardinal ace Bob Gibson.

After the 1964 Series, Houk unceremoniously fired Berra (in mid-season the management, dissatisfied with Berra's work, made up their mind to fire him at the end of the season no matter what the Yankees did) and replaced him with Johnny Keane, who had managed the Cardinals to the World Series victory over the Yankees. In spring training of 1965 Boyer was involved in a fight in a Fort Lauderdale bar with a male model, Jerome Modzelewski. During the season, he batted .251 with a career-tying 18 home runs, but the Yankees slumped to sixth place, their lowest finish in 40 years. In 1966 the Yankees fired Keane two weeks into the season, and Houk returned as manager. However, Houk's second managerial stint was far less successful than his first. With their talent and farm system both depleted, the Yankees finished dead last—the first time they had done so since 1912. After a season in which he hit .240 with 14 home runs, Lee MacPhail, who replaced Houk as general manager, traded Boyer to the Atlanta Braves for Bill Robinson, that year's Minor League Player of the Year.

During the off-season in 1964, Boyer appeared on To Tell the Truth as an imposter for a sponge diver. Boyer received three of the four possible votes.

== Post-Yankee days ==
In 1967 Boyer had his best offensive season. Playing in hitter-friendly Atlanta Stadium, he established career highs in home runs (26) and RBIs (96) in a lineup that featured the likes of Hank Aaron, Joe Torre, Felipe Alou, and Mack Jones; Boyer batted cleanup behind Aaron. He also continued his mastery of the glove, leading National League (NL) third baseman in fielding both in 1967 and 1969. In the latter year, he finally won the Gold Glove Award that had eluded him in his Yankee years; with brother Ken having won the award five times, the Boyers became the first brothers to win a Gold Glove. On August 31 of that year, Clete fell victim to Morganna, the famed buxom "Kissing Bandit." Prior to the kiss, he had been mired in a 1-for-17 slump; in that very at-bat, Boyer drove in a run with a single. He got two more hits later in the game, then eight more hits in his next 15 at-bats. In the 1969 season the Braves won the Western Division title (both leagues now had Eastern and Western Divisions, after each expanded from 10 teams to 12) for their first post-season berth since losing to the Yankees in the 1958 World Series as the Milwaukee Braves. However, the team lost in the playoffs to the eventual World Champion New York Mets.

Boyer continued to sparkle at third base until he was released by the Braves on May 28, 1971, after a bitter feud with General Manager Paul Richards and manager Lum Harris over mismanagement. Boyer has complained that the organization did not teach the players the proper fundamentals. Richards countered that Boyer was a troublemaker. Pitcher and Player's Representative Steve Hamilton suggested in an interview with Studs Terkel that Boyer was blacklisted by the MLB for criticizing team management.

Boyer left Major League Baseball and resurfaced in Japan, where he played professionally for the Taiyō Whales, from 1972 to 1975. While playing in Japan, Boyer’ s roommate was Sadaharu Oh. After retiring following the 1975 season, he was the defensive coach for the Whales in 1976. Afterwards, Boyer returned to the Major Leagues as a third-base coach with the Yankees and the Oakland Athletics, mostly with former teammate Billy Martin as manager.

== Legacy ==
Boyer's teammates recognized his defensive ability. "When I think of Clete, I think of the outstanding defensive third basemen in baseball," Richardson said. "I know Brooks Robinson got all the Gold Gloves, and he's every bit deserving of the Hall of Fame, but Clete was as good as anyone who ever played the game." Richardson and Boyer remained friends after their careers ended. Kubek, also a lifelong friend of Boyer, thought he was as good at playing third base as Graig Nettles, Brooks Robinson, and Mike Schmidt.

In 1986, Cletus Seldin, who later became a champion boxer, was named after Clete Boyer, as Seldin's grandparents were close friends with Boyer.

In 2000, Boyer opened a restaurant named "Clete Boyer's Hamburger Hall of Fame" in Cooperstown, New York, just a few miles south of the Baseball Hall of Fame. The restaurant features sandwiches and hamburgers named after various Yankees' immortals such as: "Yogi's Special meatball sub", "the Mickey Mantle Cheeseburger Deluxe", "the Reggie Veggie Burger", "the Bobby Richardson Cheeseburger", "the Roger Maris Hamburger Deluxe", and "the Whitey Ford Blue Cheese Burger". Boyer could often be found at the restaurant chatting with visitors and graciously signing photos and other memorabilia.

== Death ==
Boyer died on June 4, 2007, in an Atlanta area hospital from complications following a brain hemorrhage. Brother Ken Boyer (1964 National League MVP), former St. Louis Cardinal, predeceased Clete in 1982. Boyer's family had his cremated remains placed in a New York Yankees urn.

== See also ==
- List of baseball players who went directly to Major League Baseball
