= Curt Roberts =

American baseball player (1929–1969)

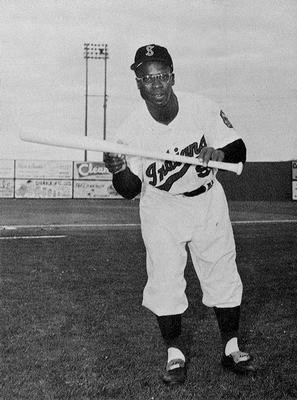
- Second baseman
- Born: August 16, 1929; Pineland, Texas, U.S.
- Died: November 14, 1969 (aged 40); Oakland, California, U.S.
- Batted: Right Threw: Right

Professional debut
- NgL: 1947, for the Kansas City Monarchs
- MLB: April 13, 1954, for the Pittsburgh Pirates

Last MLB appearance
- June 8, 1956, for the Pittsburgh Pirates

MLB statistics
- Batting average: .223
- Home runs: 1
- Runs batted in: 40
- Stats at Baseball Reference

Teams
- Negro leagues: Kansas City Monarchs (1947–1950); Major League Baseball: Pittsburgh Pirates (1954–1956)

Curtis Benjamin Roberts (August 16, 1929 – November 14, 1969) was an American baseball second baseman who played three seasons for the Pittsburgh Pirates in Major League Baseball from 1954 to 1956. He was signed by the Boston Braves as an amateur free agent before the 1951 season, and obtained by Pittsburgh a year later. After two seasons in the Pirates farm system, Major League Baseball recognizes Roberts as the first black player for the Pirates. After becoming the starting second baseman for the Pirates in his rookie year, Roberts' playing time decreased and he was out of the Majors within three seasons. He then played for multiple teams in the minor leagues before retiring from professional baseball in 1963.

A native of Pineland, Texas, but raised in Oakland, California, Roberts was considered short by Major League standards, standing 5 ft 8 in (1.73 m). Roberts was a skilled defensive player, but he could not hit with enough proficiency to remain in the major leagues. Roberts died when an automobile struck him while he was changing a tire on his car. His former Pirates teammates only learned of his death 20 years later when being interviewed for a newspaper article. Although Roberts' career was short, it paved the way for other black players to debut for the Pirates, the most notable of whom was future Baseball Hall of Famer Roberto Clemente.

== Early professional career ==
Roberts was born in Pineland, Texas but grew up in Oakland, California. He attended McClymonds High School in West Oakland, the same high school future professional athletes Frank Robinson, Vada Pinson, Bill Russell and Curt Flood all went to within a few years of each other. Soon after finishing high school at the age of 17, Roberts began his professional career with the Kansas City Monarchs in the Negro leagues. He played four seasons (1947–1950) with the Monarchs, where his teammates included Satchel Paige, Hilton Smith, Buck O'Neil and Elston Howard.

Roberts was signed by the Boston Braves in 1951 by the recommendation of scout Andy Cohen, who saw him play in the Mexican League during the 1950 off-season. They sent Roberts to their minor league affiliate in the Western League, the Denver Bears where Cohen was the manager. Prior to the 1952 season, the Bears became an affiliate of the Pittsburgh Pirates, and as part of a working agreement between the Braves and the Pirates, Roberts became a member of the Pirates organization for a $10,000 sum. Originally a shortstop in the Negro leagues, he became a second baseman during his tenure with the Bears, and started to build a reputation as an excellent fielder, leading all minor league second basemen in fielding percentage in 1953. He stayed with the Bears for the next two seasons, playing a combined total of 280 games with 15 home runs and a .285 batting average.

== Major League career ==
Prior to the 1954 Pittsburgh Pirates season, the local black community in Pittsburgh pressured the team to integrate their roster, as other teams such as the Brooklyn Dodgers and New York Giants had done. To speed up the integration, the black community began to protest against the Pirates and boycotted Pirate home games. The general manager of the Pirates at the time was Branch Rickey, who had signed the first black Major League Baseball player, Jackie Robinson, seven years earlier while general manager of the Brooklyn Dodgers. After playing two years in the Pirates minor league system, Roberts made his major league debut on April 13, 1954, against the Philadelphia Phillies at Forbes Field, to become recognized (Note: Major League Baseball recognizes Curt Roberts as the Pirates' first Black player; however, Carlos Bernier, a black Puerto Rican, debuted a season earlier on April 22, 1953.) as the first black player in Pirates' history. Prior to the game, Rickey gave a speech to Roberts and his wife that was similar to that he gave to Robinson before his first game in 1947. In the speech, Rickey explained to Roberts that he needed to have a "very even temper" in order to succeed in the major leagues, as racial abuse from the spectators was a common occurrence. Rickey later said that he selected Roberts to become the Pirates' first black player owing to his skills and calm demeanor.

In his first major league at bat, Roberts tripled against starting pitcher Robin Roberts. He also had a double in the game. Roberts hit his only career home run off St. Louis Cardinals starter Joe Presko in an 8–5 win on June 11. He scored three runs, including the game winner, in an August 6 game against the Cincinnati Reds. On September 8, Roberts' two errors against the Milwaukee Braves proved costly, as the Braves won their 10th game in a row. Roberts finished the 1954 season as the primary starter at second base, batting .232 with one home run and 36 runs batted in (RBI) in 134 games.

Roberts started the 1955 season in a slump. In his first six games, Roberts only had two hits in 18 at-bats for a batting average of .118. On April 17, in one of the few games he started that season, Roberts' wild throw to third base led to a Brooklyn Dodgers run, the decisive factor in a 3–2 Pirates loss. It was thought that the racial pressure on Roberts was affecting his ability, so to help him, Dodgers second baseman Jackie Robinson wrote a letter to Roberts discussing how to handle his emotions and offering words of encouragement. However, Roberts was soon demoted to the minor leagues and spent the rest of the 1955 season with the Hollywood Stars in the Pacific Coast League. While with the Stars, Roberts broke the Pacific Coast League record for most consecutive games without an error at second base with 40. He also missed playing time after suffering a concussion when he was hit by a pitch delivered by Bubba Church.

Roberts and teammate Johnny O'Brien competed for the second base job prior to the 1956 season. Roberts played 31 games at the beginning of the year, hitting .177 with four runs batted in, mostly in a backup role, before losing his job to future Baseball Hall of Famer Bill Mazeroski. On May 1, Roberts succeeded in getting a game-winning, two-RBI, ninth-inning double off "Vinegar Bend" Mitzell of the St. Louis Cardinals. Two days later, Roberts made his last career RBI, a double in the fourth inning in a 5–1 victory over the Cincinnati Reds.

== Later career ==
Roberts was traded to the Kansas City Athletics with pitcher Jack McMahan for Spook Jacobs and $5,000 cash. He never played a game with the Athletics, who soon sent him to the Columbus Jets of the International League in late June 1956. Neither Jacobs nor McMahan lasted beyond the 1956 season in the Majors. After being traded to the Athletics, Pittsburgh's main black newspaper, the Pittsburgh Courier, protested that Roberts never had a real chance in the Majors. However, Pirates general manager Joe L. Brown replied that Roberts was a "fine young man, but a marginal Major Leaguer," whose weak hitting was compounded by a lack of versatility: "He was really a one-position player. He didn't have the arm to play shortstop."

On August 27, as Columbus hosted the Havana Sugar Kings, Roberts became only the fifth player in International League history to hit four home runs in a game (and the first since Newark's Bob Seeds in 1938). (Note: The other three were Buffalo's Bill Bottenus against Wilkes Barre on May 12, 1895; future HOFer George Kelly of Rochester, against the Reading Coal Barons on June 24, 1919; and Baltimore's Buzz Arlett, who performed the feat twice against Reading, on June 1 and July 4, 1932.) It was also the first 4-home-run game in franchise history, as well as the first time a player on any team had performed the feat in Columbus. Roberts had struck only four home runs in 69 previous games with the Jets. Prior to the 1957 season, Roberts was traded to the New York Yankees as the player to be named later in a trade that sent former American League Most Valuable Player Bobby Shantz to the Yankees. In 1957 Roberts played with the New York Yankees minor league affiliate in Denver. At the end of the season, Roberts received several votes in the final tally for Most Valuable Player of the American Association, finishing behind Carl Willey of the Wichita Braves. Roberts never again reached the Majors, becoming a journeyman in the minor leagues and at one point played baseball in Nicaragua.

Roberts played with the Montreal Royals of the International League in 1959, where he led the league in fielding percentage with .987 and was named the Royals Most Valuable Player. He was also selected to the International League All-Star game that season. In 1960, Roberts was acquired by the Spokane Indians, a Dodger affiliate after he was made expandable by the Royals when they acquired Chico Carrasquel. He was selected to the Pacific Coast League All-Star squad in 1961. One week later Roberts suffered a broken leg after colliding with teammate Duke Carmel on the field during a game, practically ending his career. He played two more seasons in the minors, but his playing ability was diminished by the injury and Roberts retired from baseball after the 1963 season.

== Post-baseball and death ==
Roberts was married with six children. When his baseball career ended, he worked as a security guard for the University of California, Berkeley. He died at the age of 40 in Oakland, California when he was hit by a drunk driver while changing a flat tire on his car. A major piece written by Pittsburgh Post-Gazette journalist Ed Bouchette discussed Roberts' career and struggles, calling him a "forgotten pioneer". Prior to the piece, most of Roberts' old teammates were unaware that he had died nearly 20 years earlier. His son Curt Roberts Jr. supposedly was working on a book about his father's life in 1987.

== Playing style and statistics ==
Roberts was considered by critics to be an excellent fielder. By 1960, Roberts was considered to be one of the best second baseman in the minor leagues, primary because he was a "slick fielder". Former teammate Nellie King called Roberts the best handler of "chopper[s]" (a slang for a ground out) he had ever seen. According to King, the main reason why Roberts had a short career in the Majors is that the Pirates "didn't gave him enough time" to develop his skills.

Roberts could not hit with enough proficiency to remain in the Major Leagues. He had a reputation of not "hitting the big-league curve". In his three seasons with the Pirates, Roberts had a career .223 batting average (128-for-575) with one home run, forty runs batted in, 54 runs scored, and an on-base percentage of .299. In his 164 appearances at second base, he handled 856 out of 883 total chances successfully for a fielding percentage of .969, a little lower than the league average during his era.

== Legacy ==
Despite Roberts' short major league career, he paved the way for other black players to debut for the Pirates, the most notable of whom was future Baseball Hall of Famer Roberto Clemente. He befriended Clemente, teaching him how to handle the racial abuse and the huge pressure that Roberts had suffered with the Pirates. That helped Clemente ease his transition from the Dodgers minor league system, in which they had a decent number of black and Hispanic players, to the main roster of the Pittsburgh Pirates, in which only he, Roberts and third baseman Gene Baker were black. Journalist Tom Singer of MLB.com mentioned that Roberts' legacy arose mainly from his unsuccessful career with the Pirates. Singer claimed because Roberts was a "flop", it showed that the public perception of black players having to be a "superstar" to be a member of a Major League club was incorrect, thus making the integration process more "humanized" and easier for black players. With the eight previous players who broke the color barrier for their respective teams, four were later elected to the Hall of Fame, and the other four were stars in their own right.

In 1997, 28 years after his death, the Pittsburgh Pirates honored Roberts as part of the festivities for Jackie Robinson Day. Roberts was honored again in 2006 for the opening of the Pirates Highmark Legacy Square Negro League exhibit in PNC Park. The families of several Negro league players, including Roberts attended the ceremony. A park in his hometown of Pineland, Texas was dedicated in his honor in 2007.

== See also ==
- List of Negro league baseball players who played in Major League Baseball
- List of first black Major League Baseball players by team and date
