= Wayne Belardi =

American baseball player (1930–1993)

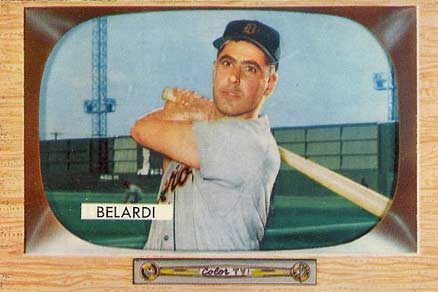
- Wayne Belardi – Detroit Tigers
- First baseman
- Born: September 5, 1930; St. Helena, California, U.S.
- Died: October 21, 1993 (aged 63); Santa Cruz, California, U.S.
- Batted: Left Threw: Left

MLB debut
- April 18, 1950, for the Brooklyn Dodgers

Last MLB appearance
- September 30, 1956, for the Detroit Tigers

MLB statistics
- Batting average: .242
- Home runs: 28
- Runs batted in: 74
- Stats at Baseball Reference

Teams
- Brooklyn Dodgers (1950–1951, 1953–1954); Detroit Tigers (1954–1956)

Carroll Wayne Belardi (September 5, 1930 – October 21, 1993) was an American professional baseball player. The first baseman and native of St. Helena, California, appeared in 263 games in Major League Baseball over all or parts of six seasons (1950–1951; 1953–1956) for the Brooklyn Dodgers and Detroit Tigers. He threw and batted left-handed, stood 6 feet 1 inch (1.85 m) tall and weighed 185 pounds (84 kg).

== Baseball career ==
=== Dodgers ===
Belardi played baseball at Bellarmine College Preparatory of San Jose, where he graduated in 1948. He also attended Santa Clara University. Big and powerful, he began his career in the Dodgers' farm system in 1949, playing part of that season for the Nashua Dodgers of the New England League, but due to economic hard times, the league was on shaky footing and Belardi was promoted to Triple-A before the New England circuit failed in midseason.

In Brooklyn, Belardi's path was blocked by the presence of eight-time National League All-Star first baseman Gil Hodges, then entering the prime of his career. Belardi played sparingly, getting into only 13 total games in 1950 and 1951, and spending much of 1951 and all of 1952 in the minor leagues. He saw the bulk of his MLB action during the 1953 and 1954 campaigns. In 1953, he appeared in 69 games, including 36 starts at first base, as the Dodgers won their second consecutive National League pennant. Belardi batted .239 over the regular season, with 11 home runs and 34 runs batted in. He came to bat twice in the 1953 World Series as a pinch hitter, going 0 for 2 as the Dodgers fell to the New York Yankees in six games.

=== Tigers ===
In 1954, Belardi was used strictly as a pinch hitter during the season's early months, collecting two hits and two bases on balls in 11 plate appearances, before Brooklyn traded him to the Tigers for three players and cash in a June 9 waiver deal. In Detroit, he received an extended opportunity to play, getting into 88 games, with 71 starts at first base. Again, he hit 11 home runs and set a personal best with 58 hits, but he batted only .232 with 24 runs batted in. Most of Belardi's 1955 season took place in the minor leagues, as he made only three appearances as a pinch hitter for the Tigers during April.

But he was able to bounce back and spend all of 1956 as the Tigers' backup first baseman, hitting a career high .279 with six home runs in 79 games and appearing in the starting lineup 26 times, including once as the Tigers' left fielder. It was his last season in the majors. In MLB, Belardi posted a .242 career batting average (143-for-592) with 71 runs, 13 doubles, 5 triples, 28 home runs, 74 RBIs and 66 bases on balls. Defensively, he recorded a .986 fielding percentage primarily as a first baseman and a few games as an outfielder.

=== Late career ===
During the 1956–1957 offseason, he was included in a couple of significant trades. On December 5, Detroit sent him to the Kansas City Athletics in an eight-player deal. Then, on February 19, 1957, he was a part of a transaction—which would include 13 players in all—he was sent to the Bombers along with pitchers Bobby Shantz and Art Ditmar and young third baseman.

Belardi and his family were on their way to Yankees camp in Spring Training on February 20, 1957 from their home in California. While heading east on U.S. Routes 60 and 70 in Indio, their car was struck by a 6-by-6-foot (1.8 m × 1.8 m) wooden bridge railing. The railing pierced the windshield and sent the car flipping into a 12-foot (3.7 m) deep dry wash. The family was sent to Coachella Valley Hospital for numerous non-fatal injuries. Wayne Belardi suffered a broken nose and various gashes and lacerations. His wife suffered a shoulder injury and bruises. Their three daughters all suffered bruises. California Highway Patrol officers stated that the Belardi family were lucky, noting that the dry washes were often the site of fatal crashes. Belardi told officers that they were going to continue on their way to Florida as soon as possible.

Belardi never made the Yankees roster. He spent the final year of his professional career by hitting .220 in 1957 with their Double-A farm team, the New Orleans Pelicans. Injuries tied to the accident would end his baseball career. Belardi died at Dominican Hospital in Santa Cruz, California on October 21, 1993 after suffering from chronic bouts of hepatitis and diabetes.
