= Tom Morgan (baseball) =

American baseball player (1930–1987)

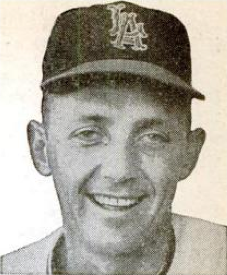
- Morgan in 1962.
- Pitcher
- Born: May 20, 1930; El Monte, California, U.S.
- Died: January 13, 1987 (aged 56); Anaheim, California, U.S.
- Batted: Right Threw: Right

MLB debut
- April 20, 1951, for the New York Yankees

Last MLB appearance
- June 8, 1963, for the Los Angeles Angels

MLB statistics
- Win–loss record: 67–47
- Earned run average: 3.61
- Strikeouts: 364
- Saves: 64
- Stats at Baseball Reference

Teams
- New York Yankees (1951–1952, 1954–1956); Kansas City Athletics (1957); Detroit Tigers (1958–1960); Washington Senators (1960); Los Angeles Angels (1961–1963)

Career highlights and awards
- 3× World Series champion (1951, 1952, 1956)

Tom Stephen Morgan (May 20, 1930 – January 13, 1987) was an American Major League Baseball pitcher. A native of El Monte, California, the 6 ft 2 in (1.88 m), 195 lb (88 kg) right-hander was signed by the New York Yankees as an amateur free agent before the 1949 season. He played for the Yankees (1951–52; 1954–56), Kansas City Athletics (1957), Detroit Tigers (1958–60), Washington Senators (1960) and Los Angeles Angels (1961–63).

A farmer in his native California, his nickname was "Plowboy."

== Playing career ==
Morgan was both as a starting pitcher and as a relief pitcher during his career. In his first five seasons he had a combined 38-22 record with 26 saves for the Yankees and appeared in three World Series (1952, 1955, and 1956). He started 46 games for New York and relieved in 110 others.

On June 30, 1954, Morgan tied a Major League Baseball record for most hit batsmen in an inning (3) vs. the Boston Red Sox.

From 1957 to 1960 he pitched mostly in relief for the A's, Tigers, and Senators, with a record of 16-21 and 18 saves in 167 games. He was then acquired by the expansion Los Angeles Angels from the Minnesota Twins on January 31, 1961.

In 1961 and 1962 Morgan teamed with Art Fowler to give the Angels a pair of closers. Morgan's combined record for those two seasons was 13-4 with 19 saves and a 2.57 earned run average in 107 relief appearances. He pitched poorly during the first half of the 1963 season and was eventually released.

Career totals include a 67-47 record in 443 games pitched, 61 games started, 18 complete games, 7 shutouts, 204 games finished, 64 saves, and an ERA of 3.61. He hit .186 with 5 home runs in 247 at bats. He made two errors in his last five seasons (202 games).

== Coaching career ==
After his player career was over, Morgan worked as a pitching coach for the California Angels from 1972–74 and 1981–83, the San Diego Padres in 1975, and the Yankees in 1979. Nolan Ryan cited him as the first one to teach him about pitching mechanics when he arrived with the Angels in 1972, and Ryan would go on to a Hall of Fame career

He also worked as a minor league instructor for the Angels and a scout for the Yankees and Atlanta Braves. In 1980, when Tommy John was struggling, Morgan gave him advice regarding his throwing motion after seeing the pitcher on TV. John said the mechanical correction helped him out of a slump. Morgan continued to help John when the pitcher joined the Angels in 1982, and he aided John again in 1984 even after being dismissed from the Angels. However, Morgan did not get along well with the younger pitchers on the staff, who considered the coach too abrasive.

== Death ==
Tom Morgan died on Thursday, January 15, 1987, at age 56 due to complications from a stroke he had suffered one week earlier.

Preceded by Norm Sherry; Larry Sherry	California Angels pitching coach 1972–1974; 1981–1983	Succeeded by Billy Muffett; Marcel Lachemann
Preceded by Bill Posedel	San Diego Padres pitching coach 1975	Succeeded by Roger Craig
Preceded by Clyde King	New York Yankees pitching coach 1979	Succeeded by Art Fowler
