= Irv Noren =

American baseball and basketball player (1924–2019)

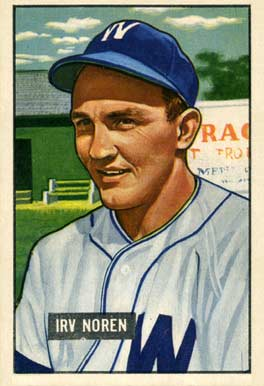
- Outfielder
- Born: November 29, 1924; Jamestown, New York, U.S.
- Died: November 15, 2019 (aged 94); Oceanside, California, U.S.
- Batted: Left Threw: Left

MLB debut
- April 18, 1950, for the Washington Senators

Last MLB appearance
- October 1, 1960, for the Los Angeles Dodgers

MLB statistics
- Batting average: .275
- Home runs: 65
- Runs batted in: 453
- Stats at Baseball Reference

Teams
- Washington Senators (1950–1952); New York Yankees (1952–1956); Kansas City Athletics (1957); St. Louis Cardinals (1957–1959); Chicago Cubs (1959–1960); Los Angeles Dodgers (1960)

Career highlights and awards
- All-Star (1954); 5× World Series champion (1952, 1953, 1956, 1972, 1973)

Irving Arnold Noren (November 29, 1924 – November 15, 2019) was an American professional baseball and basketball player. He was an outfielder in the Major Leagues from 1950 through 1960 for the Washington Senators, New York Yankees, Kansas City Athletics, St. Louis Cardinals, Chicago Cubs and Los Angeles Dodgers. He also played for the National Basketball League's Chicago American Gears in 1946–47. Later in his baseball career, Noren was a minor league manager and the third-base coach of the 1972–73 World Series champion Oakland Athletics. As a player and coach between 1950 and 1975, Noren was a member of five world championship teams. The last surviving member of the 1952 World Series champion Yankees, he died at his home in Oceanside, California, on November 15, 2019, at age 94.

Noren was born in Jamestown, New York, but grew up from the age of 12 in Pasadena, California, where he graduated from high school. Noren then attended Pasadena City College and played basketball as well as baseball. His collegiate career was interrupted by service in the United States Army during World War II.

== Playing career ==
The 6 ft (1.8 m), 190 lb (86 kg) Noren threw and batted left-handed. His pro baseball career began in 1946 when he was signed by the Dodgers while they were still in Brooklyn, but 14 years and the transfer of the team to Los Angeles would pass before he'd wear a Dodger uniform. During his four seasons in Brooklyn's farm system, he was named Most Valuable Player of the 1948 Double-A Texas League. Then, in 1949, playing for an earlier "hometown" franchise, the Hollywood Stars, Noren won the Triple-A Pacific Coast League's MVP Award, hitting .330 with 224 hits, 29 home runs and 130 runs batted in.

But the Dodgers had no room for Noren in their outfield in Brooklyn and sold his contract to the American League Washington Senators at the close of the 1949 campaign. Noren responded with a standout 1950 rookie season. He batted .295, established career highs in hits (160), home runs (14) and RBI (98), and finished 15th in the league's MVP race. His sophomore season, 1951, saw only a slight falloff to a .279 batting average and 86 RBI. But 12 games into his third campaign with the Senators, 1952, Noren was sent on May 3 to the Yankees in a six-player trade that brought Jackie Jensen to Washington.

For the next 41/2 seasons, Noren would be a valuable platoon outfielder for Casey Stengel's Yankees, appearing in three World Series (1952; 1953; 1955), all against his original organization, Brooklyn. He started four games as the Yankees' centerfielder in the 1955 World Series, filling in, along with right-handed-swinging Bob Cerv, for an injured Mickey Mantle. But Noren went only 1-for-16 as Brooklyn captured its first world championship. He would hit only .148 (4-for-27) in the three Series in which he appeared. (He was a member of the victorious 1956 Yankees but, hampered by injuries to both knees, did not get into that year's Fall Classic.) His best regular season as a Yankee came in 1954, when he batted a career-high .319 in 125 games played. New York won 103 games that season, but finished second to the Cleveland Indians. All told, Noren hit .272 with 31 homers during his 488-game tenure in the Bronx.

Noren was traded to the Kansas City Athletics in February 1957. He batted over .300 for both the 1957 Cardinals and the 1959 Cubs, before closing his career back in Southern California with the transplanted Dodgers in 1960.

Altogether, Noren played in 1,093 games over 11 MLB seasons. He collected 857 hits, including 157 doubles, 35 triples and 65 home runs, with 453 RBI. He batted .275 lifetime. Defensively, he recorded a .982 fielding percentage playing at all three outfield positions and first base.

In addition to his baseball career, Noren played briefly with the Chicago American Gears of the National Basketball League in the 1946–47 season. He played in three games for the team that season.

== Coaching career ==
After his playing days were over, Noren managed the Triple-A Hawaii Islanders in 1962–63. The Islanders went 158–153 during those two seasons, but did not qualify for the Pacific Coast League playoffs. He scouted for the expansion Senators in 1964, spent 1965–69 out of professional baseball, then managed in the Pittsburgh Pirates' farm system in 1970.

From 1971 through 1973, Noren served on the coaching staff of Oakland A's manager Dick Williams, a fellow Pasadena High School alumnus and former minor league teammate. He was a member of the 1971 American League West Division champions, and then worked with two consecutive AL pennant-winners and World Series champions in 1972–73. When Williams resigned after the 1973 title, Noren remained on the Oakland staff of new manager Alvin Dark. But he and Dark clashed and on July 8, 1974, Noren was replaced as third-base coach by Bobby Winkles—denying Noren a third consecutive World Series title when the Athletics went on to defeat the Dodgers in that year's Fall Classic.

Noren then spent one more season in the big leagues as a coach with the 1975 Cubs.

Sporting positions
Preceded by Bill Werle	Hawaii Islanders manager 1962–1963	Succeeded by Bob Lemon
Preceded by Bobby Hofman	Oakland Athletics third base coach 1971–1974	Succeeded by Bobby Winkles
Preceded by Pete Reiser	Chicago Cubs third base coach 1975	Succeeded by Harry Dunlop
