= Art Ditmar =

American baseball player (1929–2021)

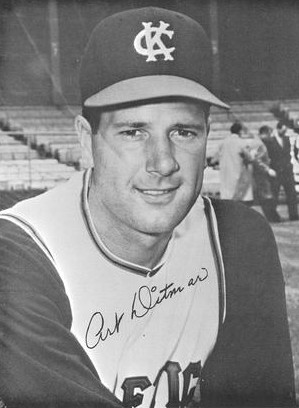
- Pitcher
- Born: April 3, 1929; Winthrop, Massachusetts, U.S.
- Died: June 11, 2021 (aged 92); Myrtle Beach, South Carolina, U.S.
- Batted: Right Threw: Right

MLB debut
- April 19, 1954, for the Philadelphia Athletics

Last MLB appearance
- May 19, 1962, for the Kansas City Athletics

MLB statistics
- Win–loss record: 72–77
- Earned run average: 3.98
- Strikeouts: 552
- Stats at Baseball Reference

Teams
- Philadelphia / Kansas City Athletics (1954–1956); New York Yankees (1957–1961); Kansas City Athletics (1961–1962)

Career highlights and awards
- World Series champion (1958)

Arthur John Ditmar (April 3, 1929 – June 11, 2021) was an American starting pitcher in Major League Baseball who played with the Philadelphia / Kansas City Athletics (1954–56, 1961–62) and the New York Yankees (1957–61).

Ditmar batted and threw right-handed and was listed at 6 feet 2 inches (1.88 m) tall and 185 pounds (84 kg).

Born in Winthrop, Massachusetts, Ditmar grew up in the Berkshire County city of Pittsfield, where he graduated from high school.

A finesse control pitcher, Ditmar divided his career between the Athletics and Yankees. Ditmar won 47 games for the Yankees in a span of five years, with a career-high 15 in 1960, despite not getting to pitch on a regular basis in a rotation which included Whitey Ford, Bobby Shantz, Don Larsen and Bob Turley. In a nine-season career, Ditmar compiled a 72–77 record with 552 strikeouts and a 3.98 ERA in 1,268 innings.

Ditmar defeated the Yankees 8–6 on September 26, 1954, in the Athletics' final game at Shibe Park in Philadelphia before moving to Kansas City. In the same game, Yankees regular catcher Yogi Berra played his only game at third base in his career, and teammate Mickey Mantle appeared at shortstop. Ditmar started and lost both Game 1 and Game 5 of the 1960 World Series for the Yankees, lasting only 1/3 of an inning in Game 1 and 1 1/3 inning in Game 5.

After a Budweiser television commercial of the 1980s incorporated the original radio broadcast of the 1960 World Series Game 7, with announcer Chuck Thompson incorrectly naming Ditmar instead of Ralph Terry as the pitcher off whom Bill Mazeroski hit a home run, Ditmar sued Anheuser-Busch for $500,000, contending his reputation was tarnished.

Ditmar died on June 11, 2021, at the age of 92.
