= Yogi Berra =

American baseball player, manager, and coach (1925–2015)

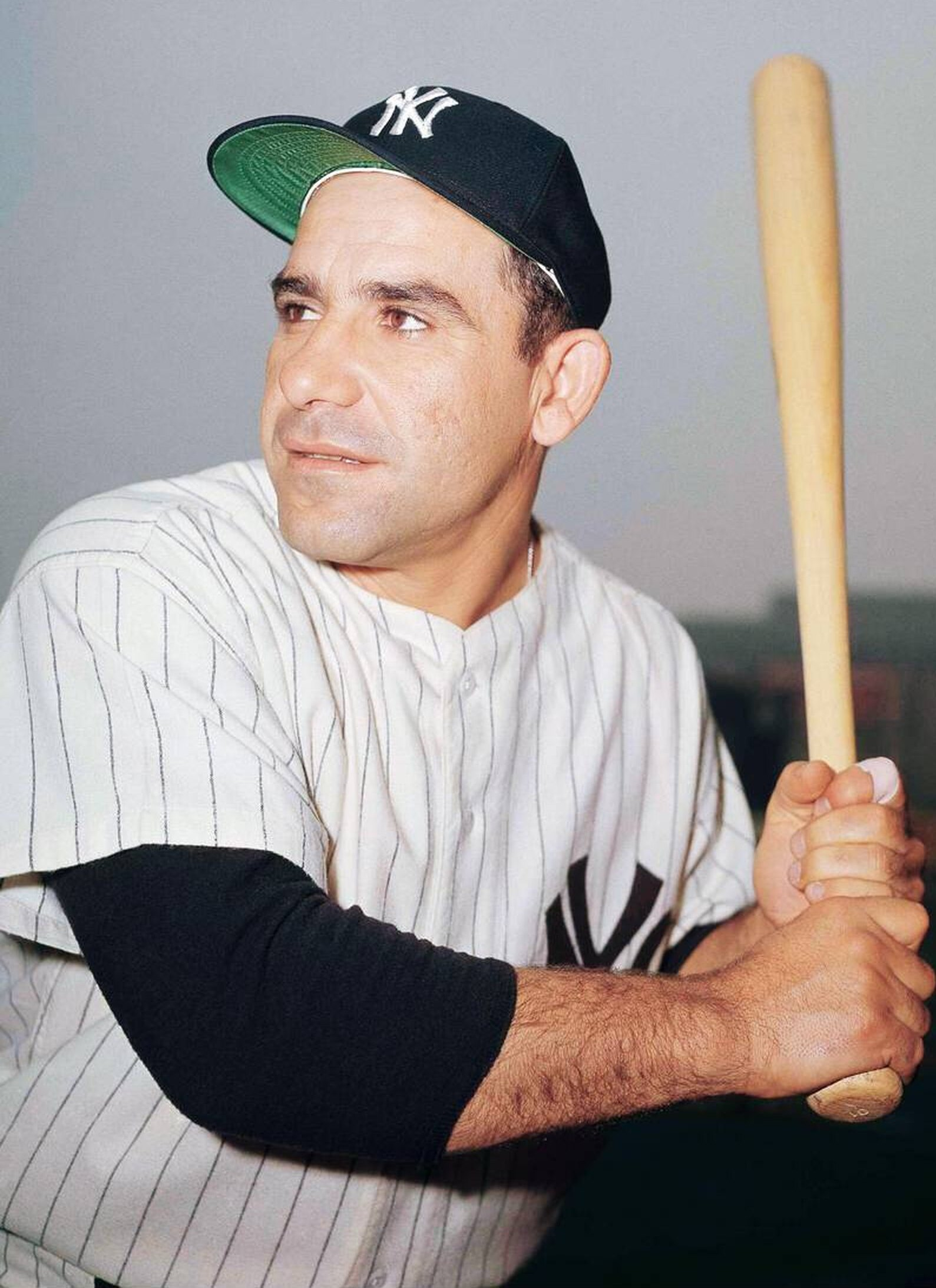
- Berra with the New York Yankees in 1957
- Catcher / Manager
- Born: May 12, 1925; St. Louis, Missouri, U.S.
- Died: September 22, 2015 (aged 90); West Caldwell, New Jersey, U.S.
- Batted: Left Threw: Right

MLB debut
- September 22, 1946, for the New York Yankees

Last MLB appearance
- May 9, 1965, for the New York Mets

MLB statistics
- Batting average: .285
- Hits: 2,150
- Home runs: 358
- Runs batted in: 1,430
- Managerial record: 484–444
- Winning %: .522
- Stats at Baseball Reference
- Managerial record at Baseball Reference

Teams
- As player: New York Yankees (1946–1963); New York Mets (1965); As manager: New York Yankees (1964); New York Mets (1972–1975); New York Yankees (1984–1985); As coach: New York Mets (1965–1971); New York Yankees (1976–1983); Houston Astros (1986–1989)

Career highlights and awards
- 18× All-Star (1948–1961², 1962²); 13× World Series champion (1947, 1949–1953, 1956, 1958, 1961, 1962, 1969, 1977, 1978); 3× AL MVP (1951, 1954, 1955); New York Yankees No. 8 retired; Monument Park honoree; Major League Baseball All-Century Team

Member of the National

Baseball Hall of Fame
- Induction: 1972
- Vote: 85.6% (second ballot)
Military career
Branch	United States Navy
Service years	1943–1945
Rank	Seaman second class
Unit	Landing Craft Support gunner
Conflicts	World War II; Normandy landings
Awards	Purple Heart; Distinguished Unit Citation; World War II Victory Medal; American Campaign Medal; European–African–Middle Eastern Campaign Medal

Lawrence Peter "Yogi" Berra (born Lorenzo Pietro Berra; May 12, 1925 – September 22, 2015) was an American professional baseball catcher who later took on the roles of manager and coach. He played 19 seasons in Major League Baseball (MLB) (1946–1963, 1965), all but the last for the New York Yankees. He was an 18-time All-Star and won 10 World Series championships as a player—more than any other player in MLB history. Berra had a career batting average of .285, while hitting 358 home runs and 1,430 runs batted in. He is one of only six players to win the American League (AL) Most Valuable Player Award three times. He is widely regarded as one of the greatest catchers in baseball history, and was elected to the Baseball Hall of Fame in 1972.

Berra was born in St. Louis, in an Italian community, and signed with the Yankees in 1943 before serving in the United States Navy as a gunner's mate in the Normandy landings during World War II. He made his major-league debut at age 21 in 1946 and was a mainstay in the Yankees' lineup during the team's championship years beginning in 1949 and continuing through 1962. Berra was a power hitter and strong defensive catcher, despite being shorter than most in the league at 5 feet 7 inches [1.70 m] tall. Berra played 18 seasons with the Yankees before retiring after the 1963 season. He spent the next year as their manager, then joined the New York Mets in 1965 as coach (and briefly a player again). Berra remained with the Mets for the next decade, serving the last four years as their manager. He returned to the Yankees in 1976, coaching them for eight seasons and managing for two, before coaching the Houston Astros. Berra appeared as a player, coach or manager in 13 of 15 World Series that New York baseball teams won from 1947 through 1981. Overall, he played or coached in 21 World Series, 13 on the winning side. Berra caught Don Larsen's perfect game in game five of the 1956 World Series. He also holds the all-time record for shutouts caught with 173.

The Yankees retired his uniform number 8 in 1972; Bill Dickey had previously worn number 8, and both catchers had that number retired by the Yankees. The club honored him with a plaque in Monument Park in 1988. Berra was named to the MLB All-Century Team in a vote by fans in 1999. For the remainder of his life, he was closely involved with the Yogi Berra Museum and Learning Center, which he opened on the campus of Montclair State University in 1998. Berra quit school after the eighth grade. He was known for his malapropisms as well as pithy and paradoxical statements, such as "It ain't over 'til it's over" and "I really didn't say everything I said."

== Early life ==
Berra was born Lorenzo Pietro Berra in a primarily Italian neighborhood of St. Louis called The Hill on May 12, 1925. His parents were Italian immigrants Pietro and Paolina (née Longoni) Berra. Pietro was originally from Malvaglio near Milan; he arrived at Ellis Island on October 18, 1909, at the age of 23. In a 2005 interview for the Baseball Hall of Fame, Berra said, "My father came over first. He came from the old country. And he didn't know what baseball was. He was ready to go to work. And then I had three other brothers and a sister. My brother and my mother came over later on. My two oldest brothers, they were born there—Mike and Tony. John and I and my sister Josie were born in St. Louis."

Berra's parents originally gave him the nickname "Lawdie", which was derived from his mother's difficulty pronouncing "Lawrence" or "Larry" correctly. He grew up on Elizabeth Avenue, across the street from boyhood friend and later competitor Joe Garagiola. That block was also home to Jack Buck early in his Cardinals broadcasting career, and it was later renamed "Hall of Fame Place". Berra was a Catholic, and he attended South Side Catholic in south St. Louis with Garagiola. Berra left school after the eighth grade due to a desire to work and assist the family's finances. He has been inducted into the St. Louis Walk of Fame.

He began playing baseball in local American Legion Baseball leagues, where he learned the basics of catching while playing both outfield and infield positions. While playing in American Legion Baseball, he received the nickname "Yogi" from his friend Jack Maguire, who, after seeing a newsreel about India, said that he resembled a yogi from India whenever he sat around with arms and legs crossed waiting to bat or while looking sad after a losing game.

== Professional baseball career ==
=== Minor leagues ===
In 1942, the St. Louis Cardinals overlooked Berra in favor of his boyhood best friend, Joe Garagiola. On the surface, the Cardinals seemed to think that Garagiola was the superior prospect, but team president Branch Rickey actually had an ulterior motive. Rickey already knew that he was going to leave St. Louis to take over the operation of the Brooklyn Dodgers and was more impressed with Berra than he let on; he apparently had planned to hold Berra off until he could sign him for the Dodgers. However, the Yankees signed Berra for the same $500 bonus ($9,900 in current dollar terms) the Cardinals offered Garagiola before Rickey could sign Berra to the Dodgers. Berra played for the Norfolk Tars in 1943.

==== World War II and subsequent return to baseball ====
Berra joined the United States Navy in 1943, and served as a gunner's mate on the attack transport USS Bayfield during the Normandy landings. A seaman second class, Berra was one of a six-man crew on a Navy rocket boat, firing machine guns and launching rockets at the German defenses on Omaha Beach. He was wounded and awarded a Purple Heart medal. During an interview on the 65th Anniversary of D-Day, Berra confirmed that he was sent to Utah Beach during the D-Day invasion as well. His military records were burned in the St. Louis Archives fire in 1973.

Following Operation Dragoon, he was sent to Tunisia before returning to the United States in January 1945 and being stationed at Naval Submarine Base New London. While there, he played for the base's semi-pro baseball team. He also bribed guards to allow him to sneak off base and play for the Cranston, Rhode Island Chiefs for $50 a game under an assumed name, as he was already signed with the Yankees. He was honorably discharged in May 1946.

Following his military service, Berra played minor-league baseball with the Newark Bears, surprising the team's manager with his talent despite his short stature. He was mentored by Hall of Famer Bill Dickey, whose uniform number Berra took. He later said, "I owe everything I did in baseball to Bill Dickey."

=== Major leagues ===
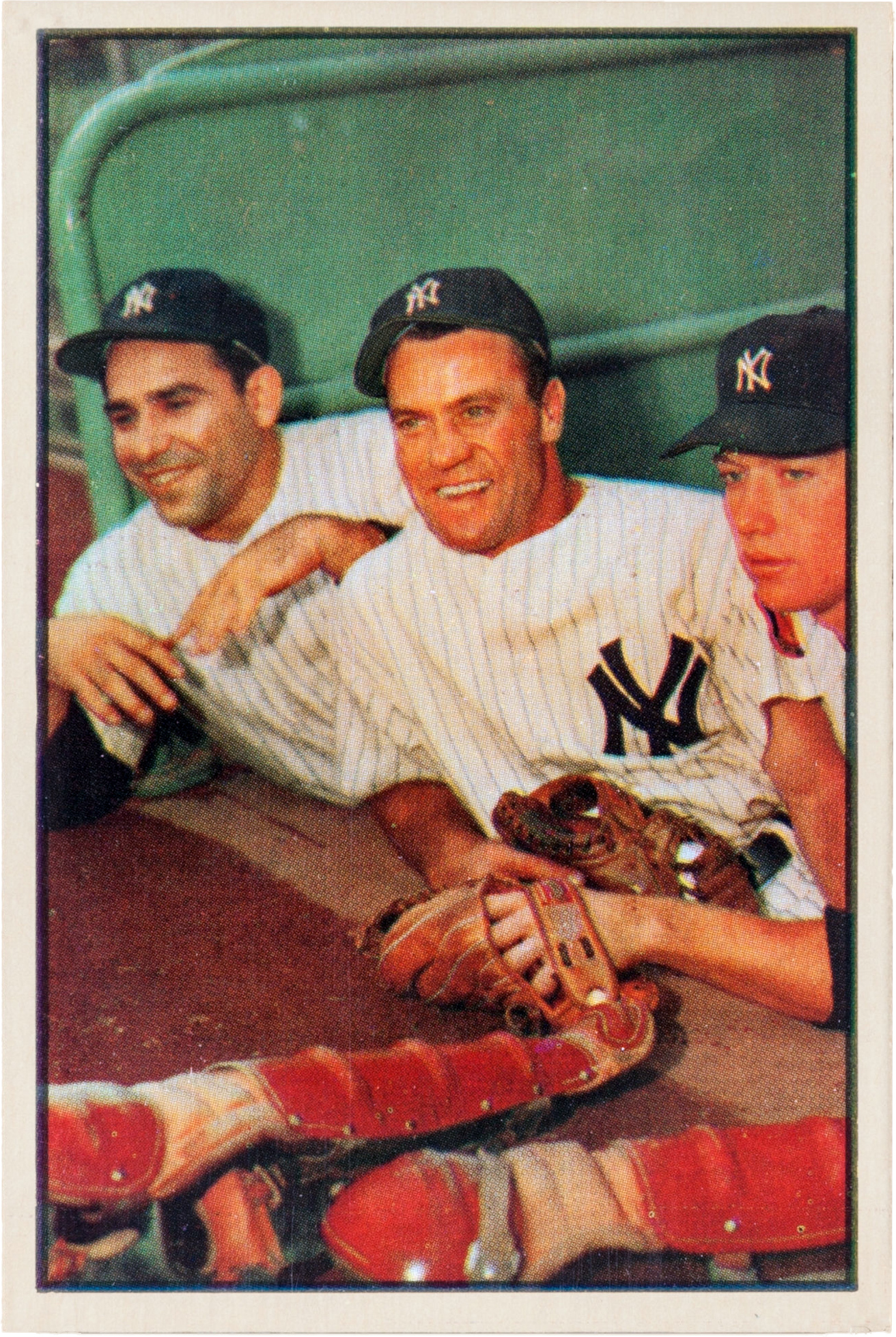
Berra with Hank Bauer and Mickey Mantle, 1953

Berra was called up to the Yankees and played his first game on September 22, 1946; he played 7 games that season and 83 games in 1947. He played in more than a hundred games in each of the following 14 years. Berra appeared in 14 World Series, including 10 World Series championships, both of which are records. In part because Berra's playing career coincided with the Yankees' most consistent period of World Series participation, he established Series records for the most games (75), at bats (259), hits (71), doubles (10), singles (49), games caught (63), and catcher putouts (457). In Game 3 of the 1947 World Series, Berra hit the first pinch-hit home run in World Series history, off Brooklyn Dodgers pitcher Ralph Branca (who later gave up Bobby Thomson's famous Shot Heard 'Round the World in 1951). In Game 7 of the 1956 World Series, he became the first player to hit two home runs in Game 7, doing so in a 9–0 shutout; he is still the only player to accomplish the feat in World Series history. He shares the record with Bill Skowron for the most home runs hit for a career in Game 7 of a World Series with three.

Berra was an All-Star for 15 seasons, and was selected to 18 All-Star Games (MLB held two All-Star Games in 1959 through 1962). He won the American League (AL) MVP award in 1951, 1954, and 1955; Berra never finished lower than fourth in the MVP voting from 1950 to 1957. He received MVP votes in 15 consecutive seasons, tied with Barry Bonds and second only to Hank Aaron's 19 straight seasons with MVP support. From 1949 to 1955, on a team filled with stars such as Mickey Mantle and Joe DiMaggio, it was Berra who led the Yankees in RBI for seven consecutive seasons. Probably the most notable game of Berra's playing career came when he caught Don Larsen's perfect game in the 1956 World Series, the first of only three no-hitters, and lone "perfecto" ever thrown in MLB postseason play. The picture of Berra leaping into Larsen's arms following Dale Mitchell's called third strike to end the game is one of the sport's most memorable images.

==== Playing style ====
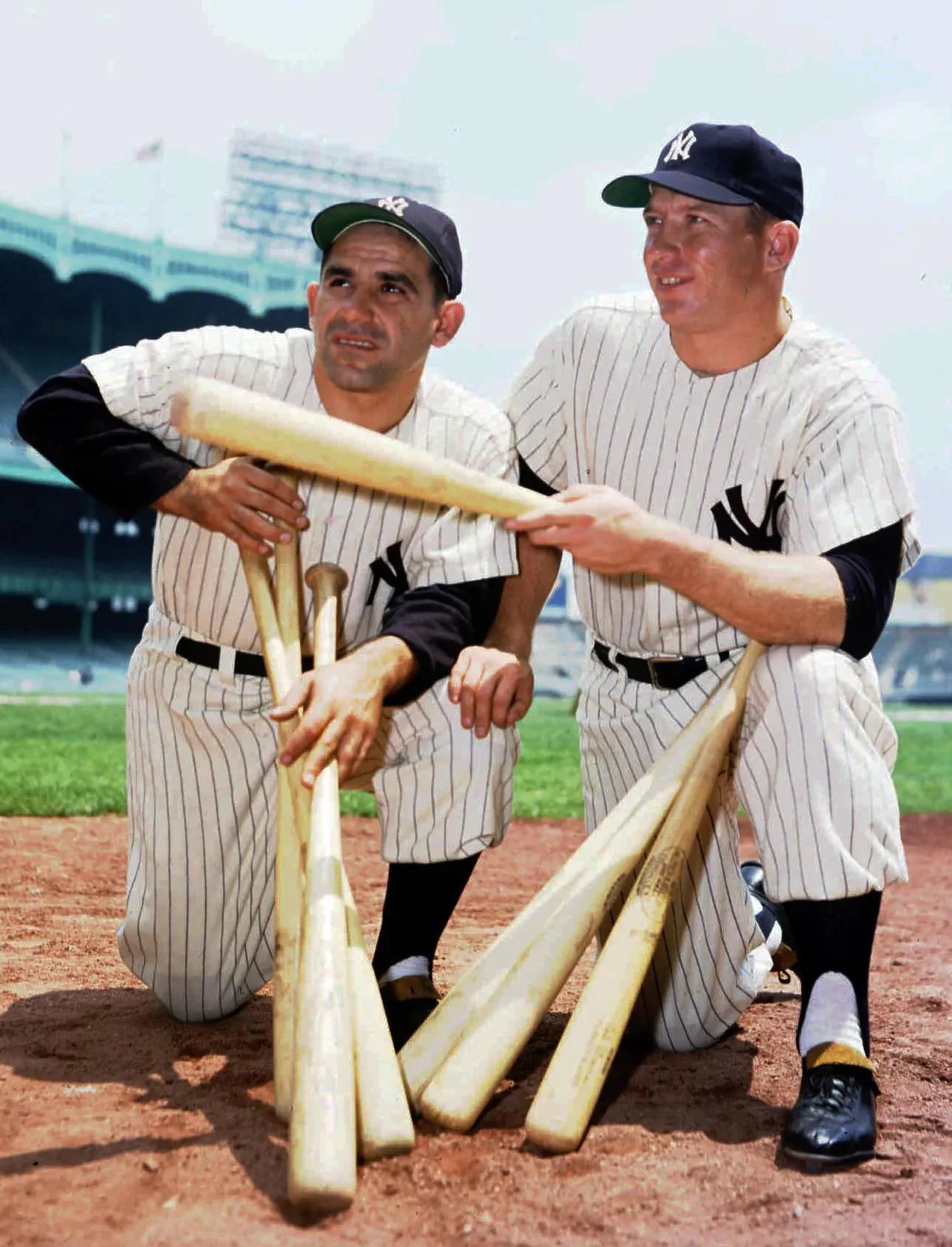
Berra with Mickey Mantle in 1956

Berra was excellent at hitting pitches outside the strike zone, covering all areas of the strike zone (as well as beyond) with great extension. In addition to this wide plate coverage, he also had great bat control. He was able both to swing the bat like a golf club to hit low pitches for deep home runs and to chop at high pitches for line drives. Whether changing speeds or location, pitcher Early Wynn soon discovered that "Berra moves right with you." Five times, Berra had more home runs than strikeouts in a season, striking out just twelve times in 597 at-bats in 1950. The combination of bat control and plate coverage made Berra a feared "clutch hitter", proclaimed by rival manager Paul Richards "the toughest man in the league in the last three innings". Contrasting him with teammate Mickey Mantle, Wynn declared Berra "the real toughest clutch hitter", grouping him with Cleveland slugger Al Rosen as "the two best clutch hitters in the game".

As a catcher, Berra was outstanding: quick, mobile, and a great handler of pitchers, Berra led all American League catchers eight times in games caught and in chances accepted, six times in double plays (a major-league record), eight times in putouts, three times in assists, and once in fielding percentage. Berra left the game with the AL records for catcher putouts (8,723) and chances accepted (9,520). He was also one of only four catchers ever to field 1.000 in a season, playing 88 errorless games in 1958. He was the first catcher to leave one finger outside his glove, a style that most other catchers eventually emulated. Tom Sturdivant, who pitched for the Yankees from 1955 to 1959, said "I can't say enough for Yogi Berra. It gives a young pitcher a lot of confidence to have a fellow like Berra calling the pitches. No one could set up the hitters better."

At age 37 in June 1962, Berra showed his superb physical endurance by catching an entire 22-inning, seven-hour game against the Detroit Tigers. Casey Stengel, Berra's manager during most of his playing career with the Yankees and with the Mets in 1965, once said, "I never play a game without my man." Later in his career, Berra became a good defensive outfielder in Yankee Stadium's notoriously difficult left field.

==== Yankee manager and harmonica incident ====
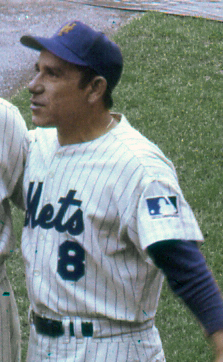
Berra as the Mets' first base coach, 1969

After spending 1963 as a player-coach—he appeared in 64 games (35 as a catcher and 29 as a pinch hitter, batting .293 in 164 at bats), and held down the Yankee's first-base coaching job otherwise—Berra retired as an active player after the 1963 World Series and was immediately named to succeed Ralph Houk as manager of the Yankees.

The so-called Harmonica Incident occurred aboard the team bus in August 1964. Following a loss, infielder Phil Linz was playing his harmonica, and Berra ordered him to stop. Seated on the other end of the bus, Linz could not hear what Berra had said, and Mickey Mantle impishly informed Linz, "He said to play it louder." When Linz did so, an angry Berra slapped the harmonica out of his hands.

All was apparently forgotten when the Yankees rode a September surge to return to the World Series, but the team lost to the St. Louis Cardinals in seven games, after which Berra was fired. Houk, who was general manager at the time, later said the decision to fire Berra was made in late August and that the incident with Linz had nothing to do with it. Although he did not elaborate, Houk said that he and the rest of the Yankee brain trust did not feel Berra was ready to manage. Players, however, said the incident actually solidified his managerial authority and helped him lead them to the Series.

==== Coach of the New York Mets and Houston Astros ====
1973 photo headshot of Berra as manager of the Mets

Berra was immediately signed by the crosstown New York Mets as a coach. He also put in four cameo appearances as a catcher early in the season. His last at-bat came on May 9, 1965, three days shy of his 40th birthday. Berra stayed with the Mets as a coach under Stengel, Wes Westrum, Salty Parker, and Gil Hodges for the next seven seasons, including their 1969 World Series championship season. He then became the team's manager in 1972, following Hodges' unexpected death in spring training.

The following season looked like a disappointment at first. Injuries plagued the Mets throughout the season. Midway through the 1973 season, the Mets were stuck in last place but in a very tight divisional race. In July, when a reporter asked Yogi if the season was over, he replied, "It ain't over 'til it's over."

As the Mets' key players came back to the lineup, a late surge allowed them to win the NL East despite an 82–79 record, making it the only time from 1970 through 1980 that the NL East was not won by either their rival Philadelphia Phillies or the Pittsburgh Pirates. When the Mets faced the 99-win Cincinnati Reds in the 1973 National League Championship Series, a memorable fight erupted between Bud Harrelson and Pete Rose in the top of the fifth inning of game three. After the incident and the ensuing bench-clearing brawl had subsided, fans began throwing objects at Rose when he returned to his position in left field in the bottom half of the inning. Sparky Anderson pulled Rose and his Reds off the field until order was restored. When National League president Chub Feeney threatened the Mets with a forfeit, Berra walked out to left field with Willie Mays, Tom Seaver, Rusty Staub, and Cleon Jones to plead with the fans to desist. Yogi's Mets went on to defeat the highly favored "Big Red Machine" in five games to capture the NL pennant. It was Berra's second as a manager, one in each league. The Mets fell to the Oakland Athletics in the 1973 World Series, but they went the distance in a close, seven-game, series.

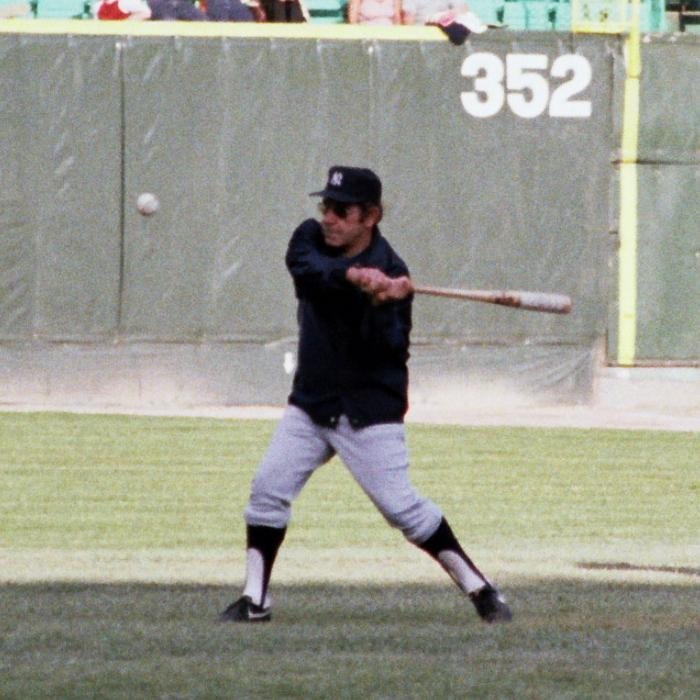
Berra hitting with a fungo bat prior to a game in 1981

Berra's tenure as Mets manager ended with his firing on August 5, 1975. He had a record of 298 wins and 302 losses, which included the 1973 postseason. In 1976, he rejoined the Yankees as a coach. The team won its first of three consecutive AL titles, as well as the 1977 World Series and 1978 World Series, and (as had been the case throughout his playing days) Berra's reputation as a lucky charm was reinforced. Casey Stengel once said of his catcher, "He'd fall in a sewer and come up with a gold watch." Berra was named Yankees manager before the 1984 season. Berra agreed to stay in the job for 1985 after receiving assurances that he would not be terminated, but impatient George Steinbrenner reneged, firing Berra anyway after the 16th game of the season. Moreover, instead of firing him personally, Steinbrenner dispatched Clyde King to deliver the news for him. The incident caused a rift between Berra and Steinbrenner that was not mended for almost 15 years.

Berra joined the Houston Astros as bench coach in 1985, where he again made it to the NLCS in 1986. The Astros lost the series in six games to the Mets. Berra remained a coach in Houston for three more years, retiring after the 1989 season. He finished his managerial career with a regular-season record of 484–444 and a playoff record of 9–10.

After George Steinbrenner ventured to Berra's home in New Jersey to apologize in person for having mishandled Berra's firing as Yankee manager, Berra ended his 14-year estrangement from the Yankee organization in 1999 and worked in spring-training camp with catcher Jorge Posada.

==== Managerial record ====
Team	Year	Regular season					Postseason			
Team	Year	Games	Won	Lost	Win %	Finish	Won	Lost	Win %	Result
NYY	1964	162	99	63	.611	1st in AL	3	4	.429	Lost World Series (STL)
NYM	1972	156	83	73	.532	3rd in NL East	–	–	–	–
NYM	1973	161	82	79	.509	1st in NL East	6	6	.500	Lost World Series (OAK)
NYM	1974	162	71	91	.438	5th in NL East	–	–	–	–
NYM	1975	109	56	53	.514	fired	–	–	–	–
NYM total		588	292	296	.497		6	6	.500	
NYY	1984	162	87	75	.537	3rd in AL East	–	–	–	–
NYY	1985	16	6	10	.375	fired	–	–	–	–
NYY total		340	192	148	.565		3	4	.429	
Total		928	484	444	.522		9	10	.474	

=== Career statistics ===
G	AB	R	H	2B	3B	HR	RBI	TB	BB	SO	AVG	OBP	SLG	OPS	FLD
2120	7555	1175	2150	321	49	358	1430	3643	704	414	.285	.348	.482	.830	.988

In 75 World Series games, Berra batted .274 (71-for-259) with 41 runs, 10 doubles, 12 home runs, 39 RBI, and 32 walks. He has accumulated the most hits (71) and plate appearances (295) of any MLB player in World Series history.

Source:Baseball Reference

== Honors ==
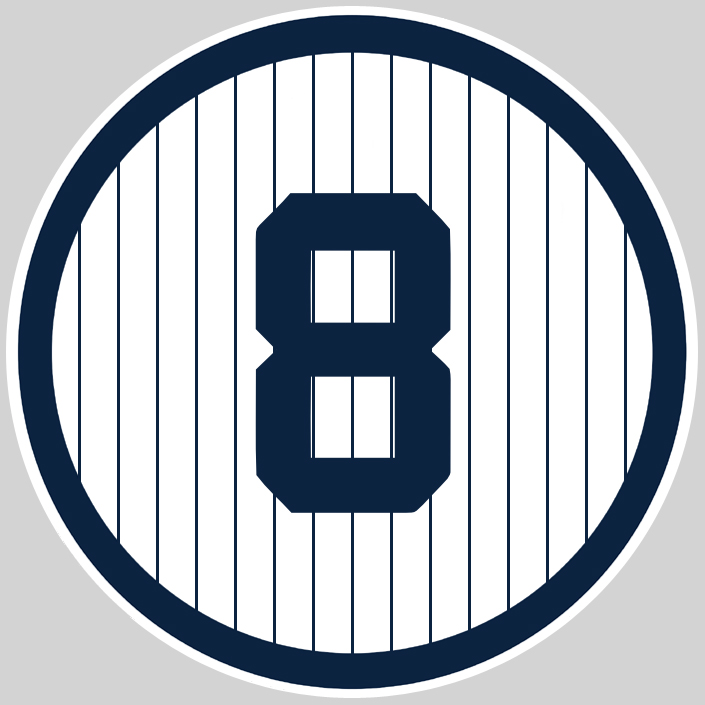
Yogi Berra's number 8 was retired by the New York Yankees in 1972.

=== Military ===
During World War II, Berra served in the Navy as machine gunner participating in the D-Day invasion and earned a Purple Heart, Distinguished Unit Citation, two battle stars, an American Campaign Medal, and a European–African–Middle Eastern Campaign Medal. In 2009, he received the Lone Sailor Award and, in 2010, he was honored with the Audie Murphy Award for his Navy service.

=== Major League Baseball ===
Berra was elected to the Baseball Hall of Fame in 1972, on his second ballot. That same year, his No. 8 was retired in 1972 by the Yankees, jointly honoring both Berra and Bill Dickey, his predecessor as the Yankees' star catcher.

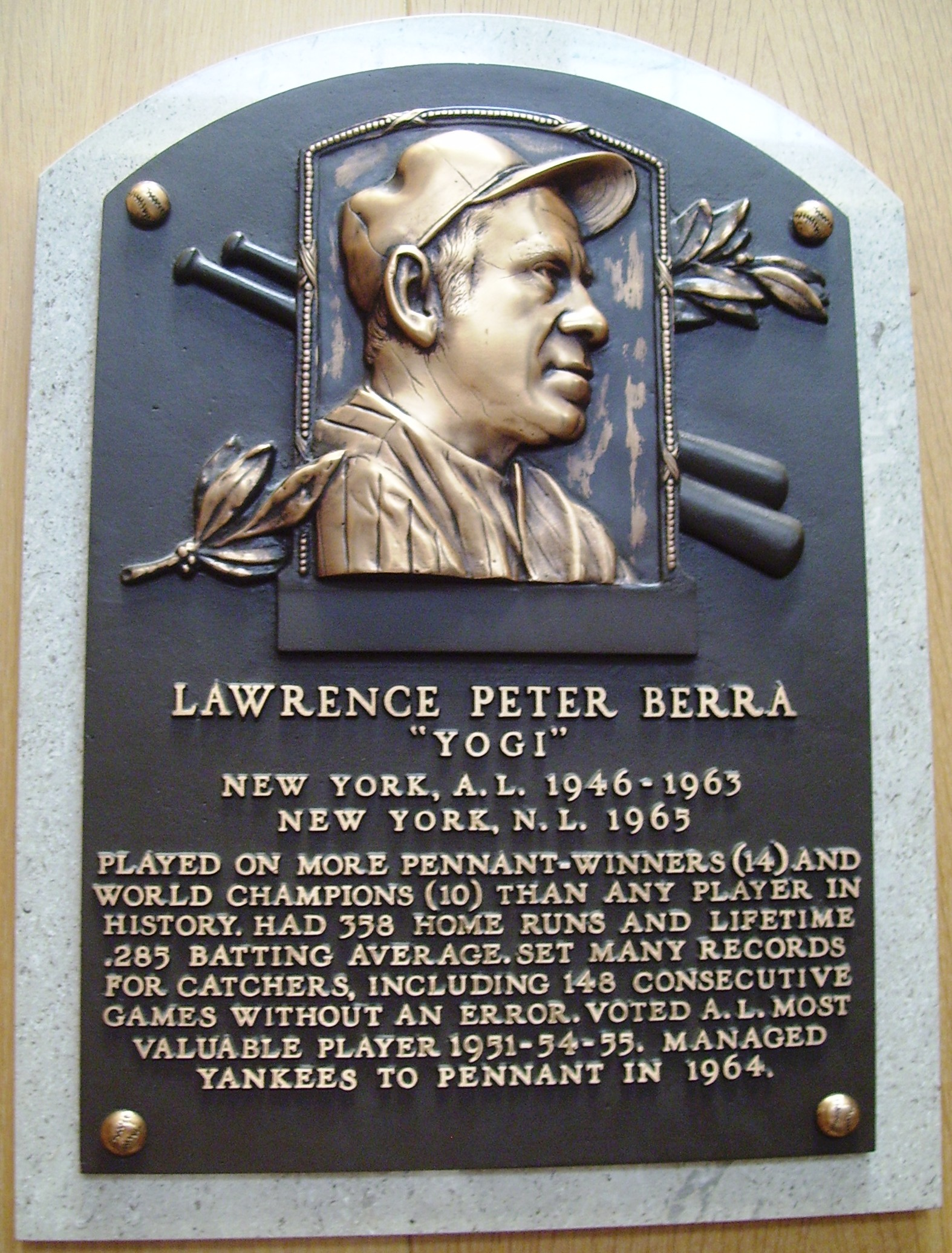
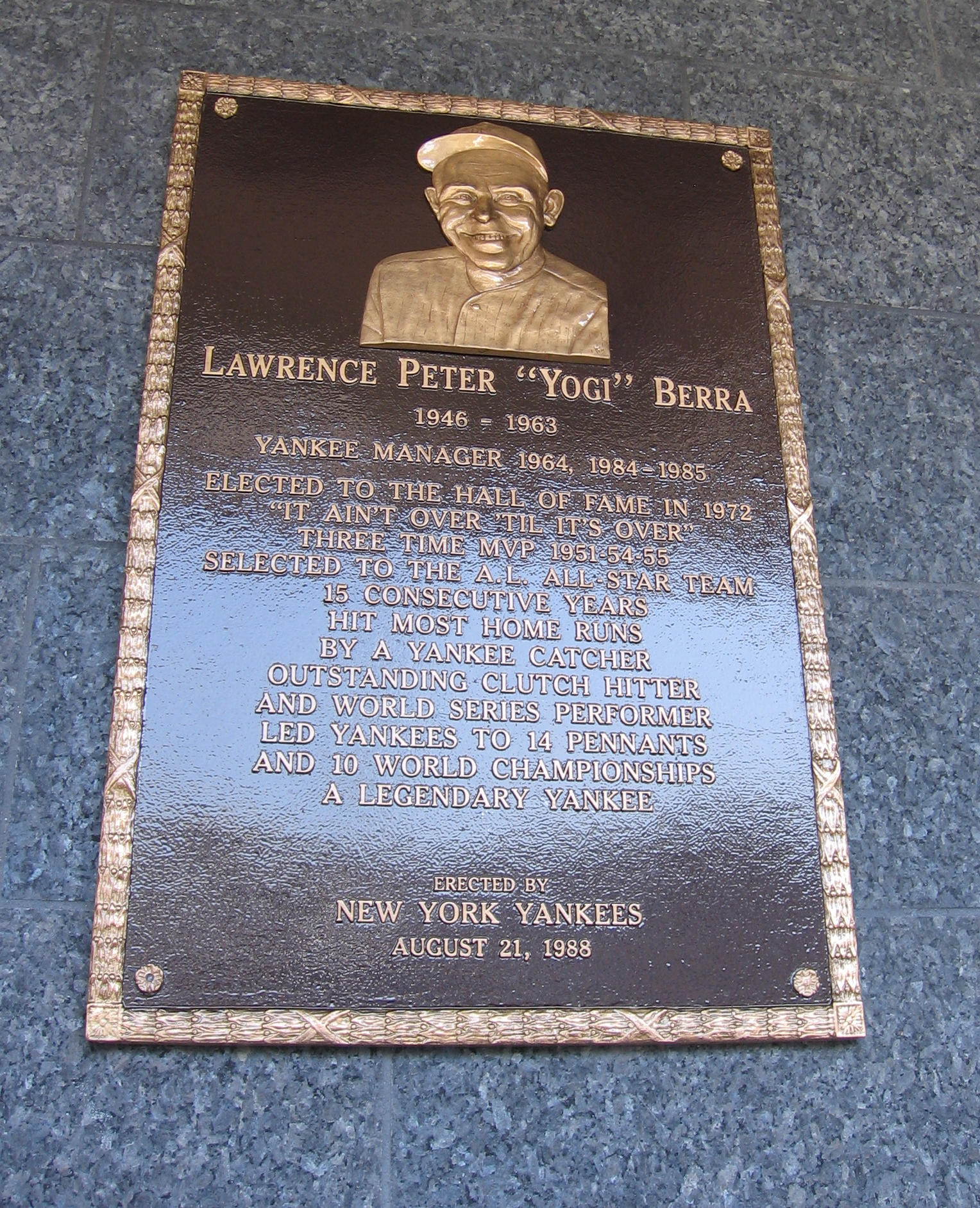
Yogi Berra's plaques at the Baseball Hall of Fame (top) and in Monument Park. (bottom)

On August 22, 1988, Berra and Dickey were honored with plaques to be hung in Monument Park at Yankee Stadium. Berra's plaque calls him "A legendary Yankee" and cites his most frequent quote, "It ain't over till it's over". However, the honor was not enough to shake Berra's conviction that Steinbrenner had broken their personal agreement; Berra did not set foot in the stadium for another decade, until Steinbrenner publicly apologized to Berra.

In 1996, Berra received an honorary doctorate from Montclair State University, which also named its own campus stadium Yogi Berra Stadium, opened in 1998, in his honor. The stadium is also used by the New Jersey Jackals, an independent minor league baseball team that has also paid homage to Berra by never issuing his jersey number, 8, to anyone.

In 1998, Berra appeared at No. 40 on The Sporting News list of the 100 Greatest Baseball Players, and fan balloting elected him to the Major League Baseball All-Century Team. In 2020, The Athletic ranked Berra at number 43 on its "Baseball 100" list, compiled by sportswriter Joe Posnanski.

On July 18, 1999, Berra was honored with "Yogi Berra Day" at Yankee Stadium. Don Larsen threw the ceremonial first pitch to Berra to honor the perfect game of the 1956 World Series. The celebration marked the return of Berra to the stadium. On that day, Yankees pitcher David Cone threw a perfect game against the Montreal Expos, only the 16th time it had ever been done in Major League history.

In 2005, Berra received the Golden Plate Award of the American Academy of Achievement. In 2008, Berra was inducted into the New Jersey Hall of Fame.

Berra was the inaugural recipient of the Bob Feller Act of Valor Award in 2013.

=== Yogi Berra Museum and Learning Center and Yogi Berra Stadium ===
In 1998, the Yogi Berra Museum and Learning Center and Yogi Berra Stadium (home of the Montclair State University baseball team and formerly home to the New Jersey Jackals) opened on the campus of Montclair State University in Upper Montclair, New Jersey. The museum is the home of various artifacts, including the mitt with which Yogi caught the only perfect game in World Series history, several autographed and "game-used" items, and nine of Yogi's championship rings.

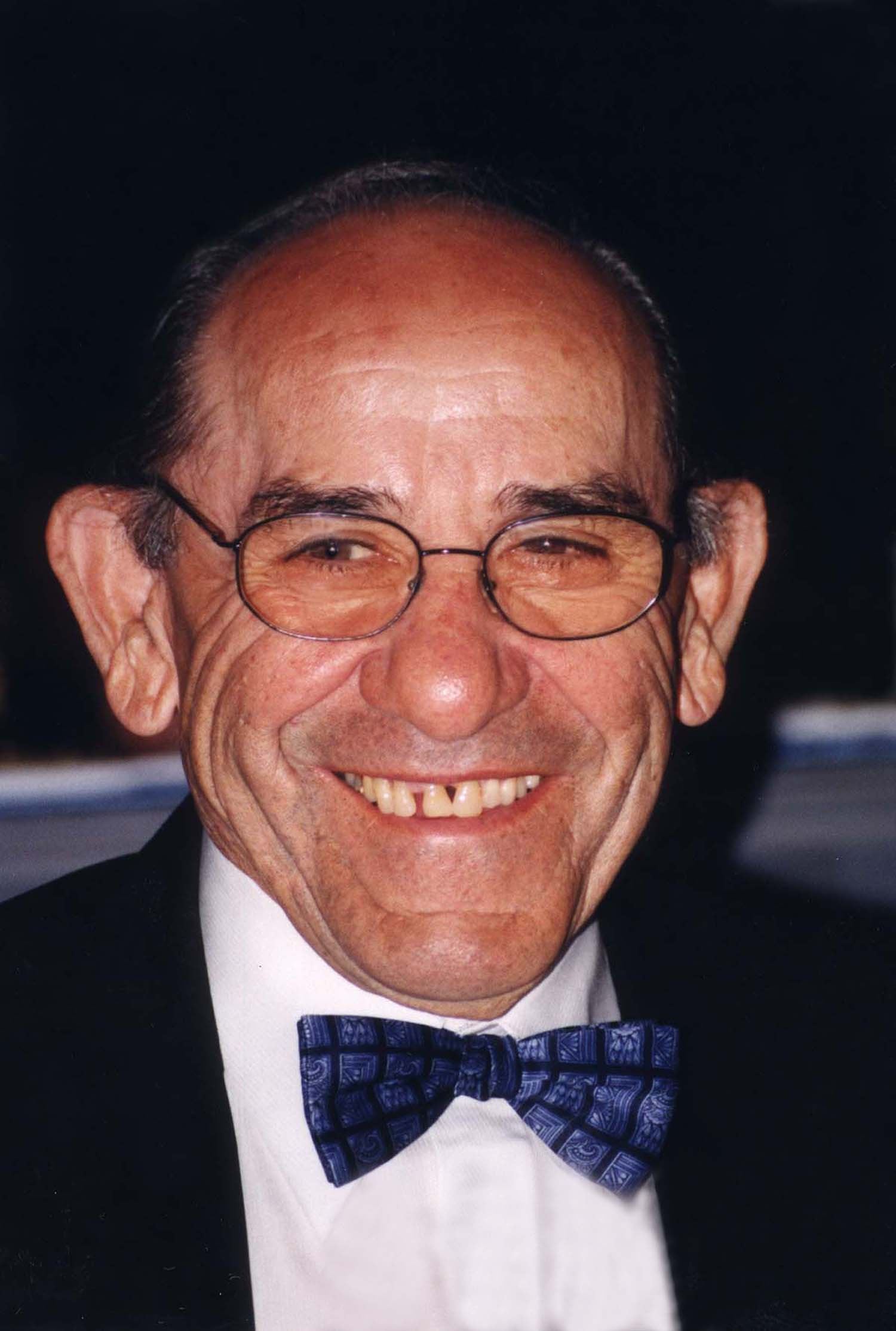
Berra in 2000

Berra was involved with the project and frequently visited the museum for signings, discussions, and other events. It was his intention to teach children values such as sportsmanship and dedication on and off the baseball diamond.

On October 8, 2014, a break-in and theft occurred at the museum, and several of Berra's World Series rings and other memorabilia were stolen. Three members of the burglary ring responsible for the theft were convicted in February 2025, while five others pleaded guilty to charges; it is believed that Berra's rings were melted down and sold by the perpetrators.

=== Presidential Medal of Freedom ===
On November 24, 2015, Berra was awarded the Presidential Medal of Freedom posthumously by President Barack Obama in a ceremony at the White House attended by members of Berra's family, who accepted the award on his behalf. At the ceremony, the President said: "Today we celebrate some extraordinary people. Innovators, artists and leaders who contribute to America's strength as a nation." Celebrating Berra's military service and remarkable baseball career, Obama used one of Berra's famous "Yogi-isms", saying, "One thing we know for sure: If you can't imitate him, don't copy him."

=== USPS stamp ===
On July 1, 2021, the United States Postal Service officially issued its Yogi Berra commemorative stamp outside Berra's museum. Berra is only the 30th baseball player to have his picture on a stamp, and he is the first player to appear on a USPS stamp in nine years. Berra is also the first player since Lou Gehrig in 1989 to receive an issuance all his own, where a great majority of those stamps have been part of multiplayer issuances.

== Other activities ==
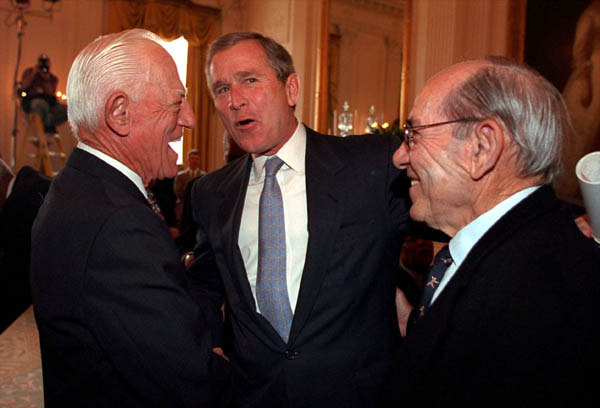
Sparky Anderson, George W. Bush, and Yogi Berra in the East Room of the White House, 2001

Berra and former teammate Phil Rizzuto were partners in a bowling alley venture in Clifton, New Jersey, originally called Rizzuto-Berra Lanes. The two eventually sold their stakes to new owners, who changed the name to Astro Bowl before selling the property to a developer who closed the bowling alley in 1999 and converted it into retail space. Yogi Berra's Fitness & Racquetball Club in Fairfield, New Jersey, was popular in the 1980s.

Berra was also involved in causes related to his Italian American heritage. He was a longtime supporter of the National Italian American Foundation (NIAF) and helped fund raise for the Foundation. He was inducted into the Italian American Hall of Fame in 2004.

Berra was a recipient of the Boy Scouts of America's highest adult award, the Silver Buffalo Award.

Based on his style of speaking, Yogi was named "Wisest Fool of the Past 50 Years" by The Economist magazine in January 2005.

In the 2007 television miniseries The Bronx Is Burning, Berra was portrayed by actor Joe Grifasi. In the HBO sports docudrama 61*, Berra was portrayed by actor Paul Borghese, and Hank Steinberg's script included more than one of Berra's famous "Yogi-isms". In 2009, Berra appeared in the documentary film A Time for Champions, recounting his childhood memories of soccer in his native St. Louis. The 2022 documentary It Ain't Over focuses on Berra's life and career.

Yogi and his wife Carmen were played by real-life newly married actors Peter Scolari and Tracey Shayne in the 2013 Broadway play Bronx Bombers.

Yogi joined Athlete Ally as a champion for inclusion in sports and as an Athlete Ally Pro Ambassador in 2013. The Yogi Berra Museum and Learning Center also collaborated with Athlete Ally on the innovative "Championing Respect" museum exhibit, which charted how sports has contributed to social change.

== Personal life ==
Berra married Carmen Short on January 26, 1949. They had three sons and were longtime residents of Montclair, New Jersey, until Carmen's declining health caused them to move into a nearby assisted living facility in West Caldwell. Each of their sons played professional sports: Dale Berra played shortstop for the Pittsburgh Pirates, the New York Yankees (managed by Yogi in 1984–85), and the Houston Astros; Tim Berra played for the Baltimore Colts in the 1974 NFL season; and Larry Berra played for three minor league teams in the New York Mets organization. Carmen Berra died on March 6, 2014, of complications from a stroke, at age 85; the couple had recently celebrated their 65th anniversary. Following Carmen's death, the house in Montclair was listed for sale at $888,000, a reference to Yogi's uniform number.

== Death ==
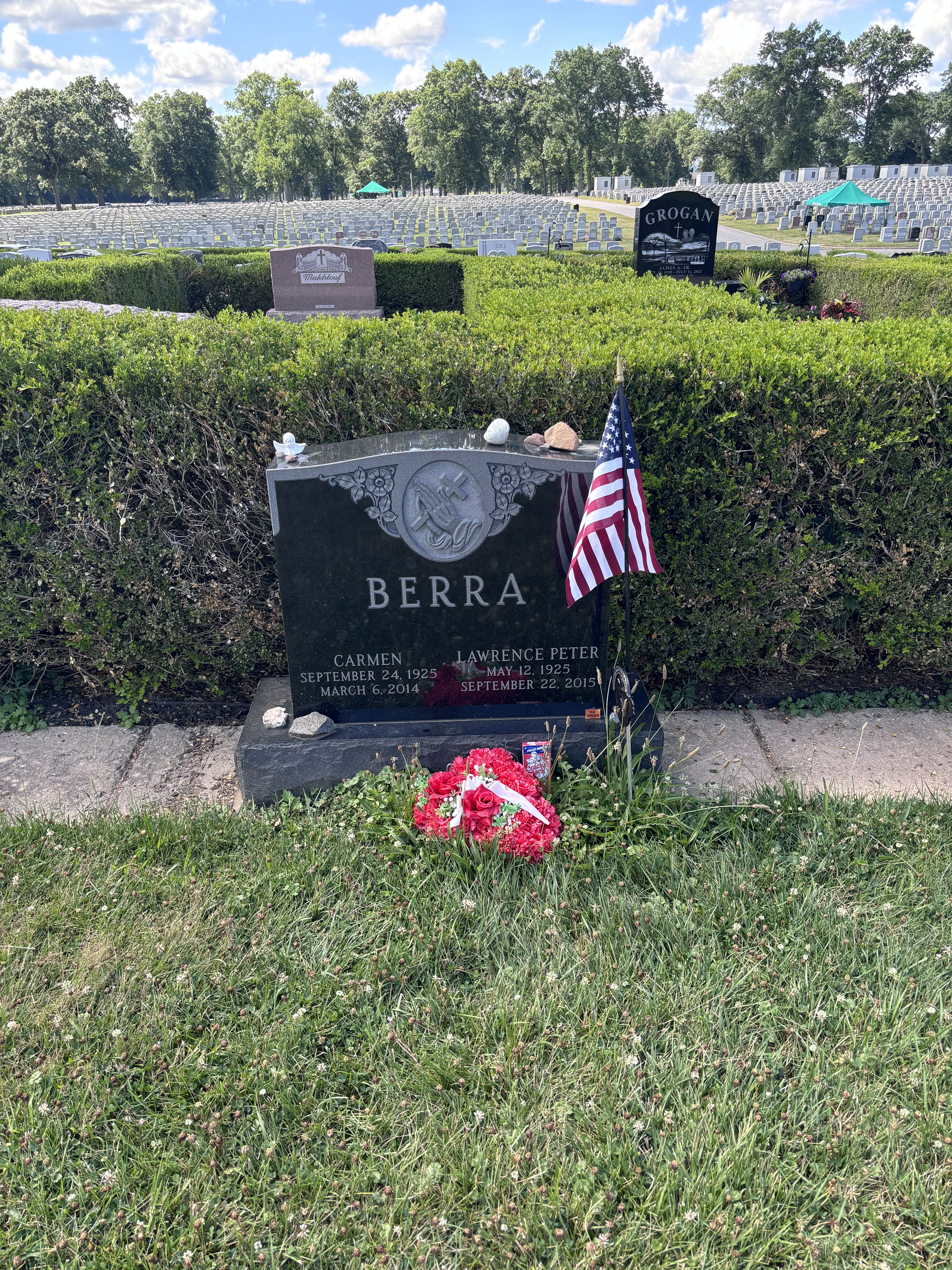
The Final Resting Place of Yogi Berra (1925–2015), Gate of Heaven Cemetery, East Hanover, NJ

Berra died in his sleep at age 90 of natural causes in West Caldwell, New Jersey, on September 22, 2015.

The Yankees added a number "8" patch to their uniforms in honor of Berra, and the Empire State Building was lit with vertical blue and white Yankee "pinstripes" on September 23. New York City lowered all flags in the city to half-staff for a day in tribute. A moment of silence was held before the September 23 games of the Yankees, Dodgers, Astros, Mets, Nationals, Tigers, Pirates, and his hometown St. Louis Cardinals, as well as the ALPB's Long Island Ducks. The Yogi Berra Museum held a tribute on October 4.

Berra's funeral services were held on September 29, and were broadcast by the YES Network. His ashes were interred next to his wife, Carmen, at the Gate of Heaven Cemetery in East Hanover, New Jersey. Berra's longtime friend, Joe Garagiola, who lived directly across the street from Berra when they were young, died six months later on March 23, 2016. Berra's Yankee teammate Don Larsen, who pitched the only perfect game in World Series history and was the only surviving member of the 1956 game at the time of Berra's death, died on January 1, 2020.

== "Yogi-isms" ==
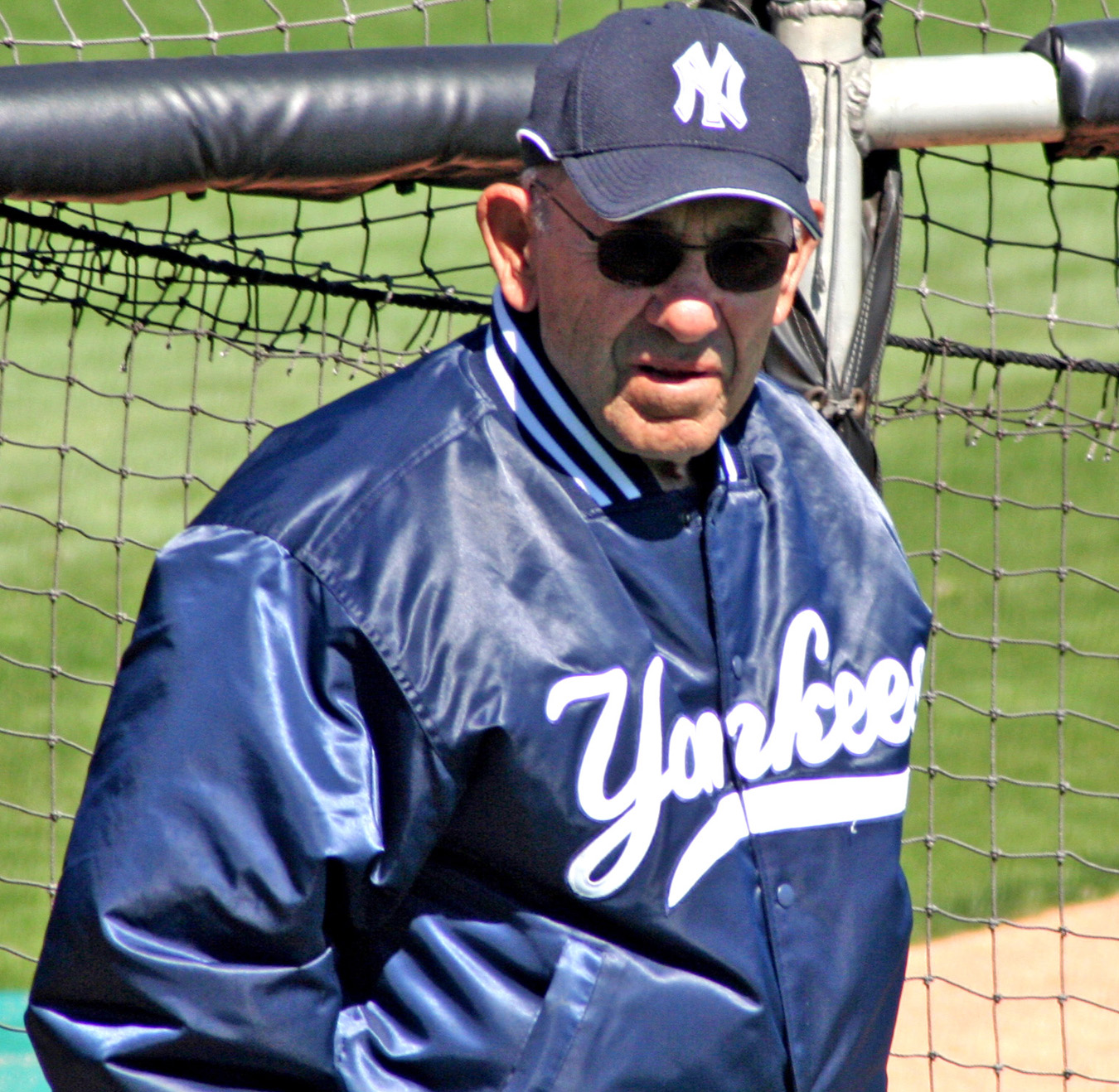
Berra in 2007

Berra was known for his impromptu pithy comments, malapropisms, and seemingly unintentional witticisms, known as "Yogi-isms". These often took the form of either an apparent tautology or a contradiction, but often with underlying humor and wisdom. Allen Barra has described them as "distilled bits of wisdom which, like good country songs and old John Wayne movies, get to the truth in a hurry."

=== Examples ===
- "It ain't over 'til it's over." The Mets trailed the Chicago Cubs by 9½ games in the National League East in July 1973. They rallied to clinch the division title and eventually reached the World Series. This line inspired the song "It Ain't Over 'til It's Over" by Lenny Kravitz. Though widely attributed to Berra and becoming the title of a film about him, there is doubt he said the words in the first place.
- "It's déjà vu all over again." Berra explained that this originated when he witnessed Mickey Mantle and Roger Maris repeatedly hitting back-to-back home runs in the Yankees' seasons in the early 1960s.
- "You can observe a lot by watching."
- When giving directions to Joe Garagiola to his New Jersey home, which was accessible by two routes: "When you come to a fork in the road, take it."
- On why he no longer went to Ruggeri's, a St. Louis restaurant: "Nobody goes there anymore. It's too crowded."
- At Yogi Berra Day at Sportsman Park in St. Louis: "Thank you for making this day necessary."
- When complimented by a woman in the grandstands at Wrigley Field on how he seemed to be enduring the heat well on a hot summer's day: "Thanks, ma'am. You don't look so hot yourself."
- "Always go to other people's funerals; otherwise they won't go to yours."
- On declining attendance in Kansas City: "If people don't want to come to the ballpark, how the hell are you gonna stop them?"
- "Texas has a lot of electrical votes."
- "The future ain't what it used to be."
- "A nickel ain't worth a dime anymore."
- "If you can't imitate him, don't copy him."
- "Ninety percent of the game is half mental." (This is sometimes rendered as "Baseball is 90 percent mental. The other half is physical.")
- "I really didn't say everything I said."

Berra is often incorrectly credited with the saying "It ain't over till the fat lady sings," which was first attributed to Texas Tech University sports information director Ralph Carpenter in 1976. When asked about the quotation in 1998, Berra told a New York Times reporter, "That's one of the things that I said that I never said."

== In popular culture ==
In the 1950s, Berra hired Frank Scott as his agent for off-the-field appearances and endorsements. Scott was the first sports agent to focus on an athlete's off-the-field earnings. Berra appeared in advertisements for products and companies including Yoo-Hoo, Visa, Pringles, Stove Top stuffing, Aflac, Camel cigarettes, Ballantine Beer, Kraft Italian salad dressing, Prest-O-Lite batteries, Wheaties, Shelby bicycles, Diamond Chemicals, Spencer Chemicals, AMF Bowling, Miller Lite, Kinney Shoes, Pepsi, Jockey underwear, wristwatches, orange juice, foot spray, and cat food.

The cartoon character Yogi Bear first appeared in 1958. The name was similar enough to Berra's name that he considered suing Hanna-Barbera, but Hanna-Barbera claimed that the similarity was just a coincidence. Berra's obituary by the Associated Press initially said that Yogi Bear had died.

== Books ==
- Yogi: The Autobiography of a Professional Baseball Player, Yogi Berra and Ed Fitzgerald (1961) LOC: 61-6504 OCLC 937429264
- Behind the Plate, Lawrence Yogi Berra and Til Ferdenzi (1962) ISBN 978-1-258-11403-9
- Yogi: It Ain't Over (1989) ISBN 0-07-096947-7
- The Yogi Book: I Really Didn't Say Everything I Said (1998) ISBN 0-7611-1090-9
- When You Come to a Fork in the Road, Take It! Inspiration and Wisdom from One of Baseball's Greatest Heroes (2001) ISBN 0-7868-6775-2
- What Time Is It? You Mean Now?: Advice for Life from the Zennest Master of Them All (2002) ISBN 0-7432-3768-4
- Ten Rings: My Championship Seasons (2003) ISBN 0-06-051381-0
- Let's Go, Yankees! (2006) ISBN 1-932888-81-0
- You Can Observe a Lot by Watching (2009) ISBN 978-0-470-45404-6
- The Wit and Wisdom of Yogi Berra (2014) ISBN 0312917600

== See also ==
- List of Major League Baseball career hits leaders
- List of Major League Baseball career home run leaders
- List of Major League Baseball career putouts as a catcher leaders
- List of Major League Baseball career runs scored leaders
- List of Major League Baseball career runs batted in leaders
- List of Presidential Medal of Freedom recipients
