= Harmonica Incident =

1964 dispute between New York Yankees' manager Yogi Berra and a backup player

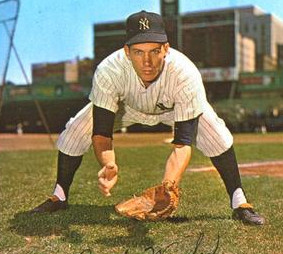
Phil Linz, whose playing of a harmonica instigated the incident

The Harmonica Incident took place on a New York Yankees team bus on August 20, 1964, en route to O'Hare International Airport. Infielder Phil Linz, slightly resentful at not being played during a four-game sweep by the Chicago White Sox that was believed at the time to have seriously set back the Yankees' chances at that year's American League pennant, began playing a harmonica in the back of the bus. Manager Yogi Berra, feeling that Linz's behavior was inappropriate given the team's recent poor performance, angrily called on him to stop, whereupon Linz threw the harmonica and loudly complained about being singled out despite not having been at fault for the losses.

Journalists on the bus following the team reported the incident in the next day's newspapers, and it became national news. Although Linz was fined for the incident, he received an endorsement contract from harmonica manufacturer Hohner after the company saw an increase in sales. The contract more than made up for Linz's lost money from the fine. Radio stations in Boston urged fans of the Red Sox, whom the Yankees played immediately afterward, to greet Linz at the plate in Fenway Park with a harmonica and kazoo serenade. At an exhibition game against the crosstown New York Mets, Mets players tossed harmonicas onto the field.

The incident had divergent effects on the team. For the players, it ended well: Berra's authority as their manager was decisively established and they went 30–11 through the end of the season, clinching the pennant that had seemed out of reach. For the team's management, which had been dogged all season by reports that Berra could not control his former teammates, it confirmed that impression, and efforts to find a replacement for Berra (that had reportedly already been underway) succeeded shortly afterwards, with Johnny Keane, who was considered likely to be fired from his position as St. Louis Cardinals' manager after the season concluded, secretly agreeing to become the Yankees' manager. Keane's team also came back from deep in the standings to win the National League pennant, and then defeated the Yankees in that year's World Series. The day afterwards, Berra was fired and Keane shocked his superiors by resigning instead of accepting a contract extension. Keane took over from Berra a few days later.

Despite its role in catalyzing the team that season, the incident has been seen as the beginning of the end of the Yankees' 15-year postwar dynasty, since it also coincided with the announcement that the CBS television network was buying the team. Keane was never able to fully earn the respect of either the aging, injury-plagued stars or the few promising younger players, The 1965 Yankees not only failed to win the pennant, they recorded the team's first losing season in 40 years. When the subsequent season started with even worse results, Keane was fired, although that did not prevent the Yankees from finishing in last place. They did not return to the World Series until 1976, nearly four years after CBS had sold the team to George Steinbrenner.

== Background ==
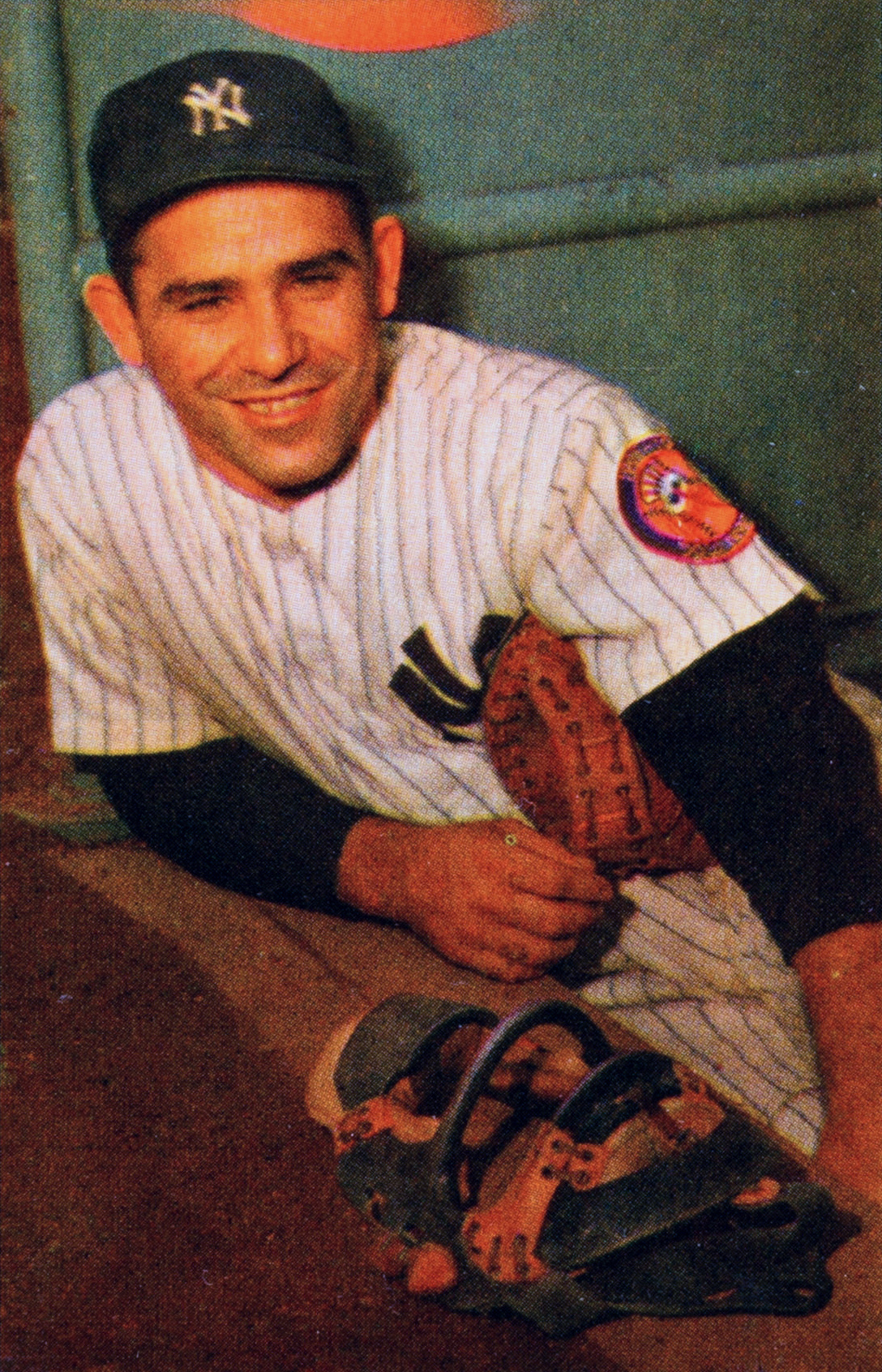
Yogi Berra, c. 1953

=== Yogi Berra and the Yankees ===
In the years after World War II, the Yankees had come to dominate Major League Baseball in a way that no team had done before or since. Between 1947 and 1963, the team appeared in the World Series 14 times, winning ten. Rooting for the Yankees, as Peter Golenbock, the author of several books about the Yankees, some in collaboration with players, wrote, "became like rooting for U.S. Steel". Stars of the earlier era like Joe DiMaggio had been almost seamlessly replaced by younger players like Mickey Mantle. One of those, former catcher Lawrence "Yogi" Berra, had been a constant on the team.

Berra had accumulated considerable baseball knowledge during his career. Casey Stengel, the Yankees' manager throughout the 1950s, had considered him the most important player on the team, sometimes describing Berra as his assistant manager. When he published his own memoirs in 1961, a blurb on the back cover by well-regarded Baltimore Orioles manager Paul Richards suggested that Berra would be an excellent manager himself. Since Berra was nearing the end of his playing career, the Orioles and other teams made indications that they would be interested in hiring him for that position.

Berra explained later that he had turned down the other clubs' offers because many of them were not regular contenders for the pennant and he did not believe it likely that a new manager would last more than two seasons. During 1962, the Yankees' management noticed that Stengel, whom they had fired due to his advancing age a few seasons earlier, was becoming a big draw for the expansion New York Mets of the National League as the manager during their inaugural season. Despite the Mets' poor performance, the team regularly filled the aging Polo Grounds, and the Yankees only barely outdrew them even though they wound up winning the World Series. The executives worried that Berra, popular with the fans and the media, might be lured over to the Mets after his playing days were done (he would in fact join as player-coach in 1965), and with that team expected to move to the newer, larger Shea Stadium within two seasons, the possibility existed that the Mets' attendance figures could exceed those of the Yankees.

So, before the start of the 1963 season, manager Ralph Houk took Berra on a yachting trip with several of the team's executives. Out on the ocean, general manager Roy Hamey told Berra that, at the end of the season, he would be leaving that position to become a scout. He in turn would be replaced by Houk, leaving the field manager's position open. Hamey asked Berra if he was interested in that job. The catcher was incredulous at first, but then accepted the offer.

Not all the executives on board were enthusiastic about the prospect of Berra taking over as the Yankees' manager. Team president Dan Topping Jr., son of co-owner Dan Topping, who saw the chief benefit of hiring Berra as manager to be counteracting Stengel's force as a draw for the Mets, was not sure about the wisdom of the decision otherwise. Co-owner Del Webb had more serious doubts: Berra, unlike most other major league managers of the era, had no experience managing in the minor leagues; he also thought it inadvisable to go from being a teammate one season to a manager the next. Berra visited him in California to reassure him on both points, and Webb said he would support him as manager.

Berra was made a player-coach that season, although he fulfilled the latter role primarily by fungo hitting to his teammates during pregame warmups. The promotion to manager was not made public (Note: The reasons for the secrecy are not known, but it has been reported that Hamey had been having trouble selling his Upper East Side apartment and did not want it known that he had to leave town, which would likely have driven down the price he could expect even further.) until after the Yankees had ended the season with a four-game loss to the Los Angeles Dodgers in the World Series. Reporters greeted the news with some of the skepticism that Webb had expressed privately. Berra reassured them that he had learned much from Stengel and Houk in his years with the team. "You can observe a lot by watching", he said, adding to the stock of "Yogi-isms", the pithy, sometimes apparently self-contradictory remarks that had endeared him to the press over the years. "If you ask me a question I don't know", he continued, "I'm not going to answer".

As the next season drew near, Berra himself seemed to express some doubts about his own capabilities as manager. "If we win, they'll say Mickey Mouse could have managed this team to the pennant. If we lose, they'll say it's my fault", he observed at one point. "Maybe I'll quit even if we win".

=== The 1964 season ===
Berra faced challenges almost from the start of the season. The team, which had not played well during spring training, lost its first three games in extra innings. Pitcher Jim Bouton, seen as the Yankees' next ace after winning 21 games in his rookie season the previous year, had sat out part of the preseason due to a contract dispute and got off to an uneven start when he returned. Within weeks of Opening Day, all three of the team's starting outfielders—Mickey Mantle, Roger Maris, and Tom Tresh—were out with injuries, forcing Berra to play Johnny Blanchard, the team's backup catcher, in that position for some games.

Fortunately for Berra, the team's pitchers made up for the injuries. Ace Whitey Ford performed consistently well, and Bouton had improved to his previous season's form by the end of April, to the point where he finished the season with more wins than Ford. Al Downing, another younger player and the first African American Yankee on the mound, also pitched well in the early months, striking out an average of one batter per inning. But then Bouton and Downing were sidelined with strained muscles. The relief pitchers also had their share of injuries, keeping Steve Hamilton and Hal Reniff from replicating their combined 23 saves in 82 appearances of the previous season.

Berra was also having issues with the healthy players. Concerns about his capability to manage former teammates were, in the eyes of some media observers, proving justified. Reports began to circulate about late-night carousing by certain players, Mantle in particular. "He ran wild on Yogi", said sportswriter Maury Allen, "staying out late and carrying on".

This was in large part a matter of perception. Mantle and other players had done the same thing under Houk, who had never felt it necessary to impose a curfew on them. "After racking up yet another win under the lights", writes baseball historian Philip Bashe, "[Houk']s clubs were known to wind up under tables". Phil Pepe, who covered the team for the World-Telegram and Sun, noted that under Berra, the Yankees "weren't doing anything differently than before—except not winning".

Berra's exercise of managerial authority did create some friction between him and his former teammates. He benched third baseman Clete Boyer when his late night antics began affecting his play. "Our relationship at that time wasn't too good", Boyer said later, adding that he only appreciated the move when he himself became a coach after his playing career. Berra's relationship with the pitching staff was rocky as well. He often criticized them in front of their teammates, something Houk had never done.

The relievers in particular began complaining to Houk about Berra having had them warm up in the bullpen only to leave his current pitcher in. This was consistent with a general pattern of indecisiveness some other players also noted. Hamilton recalled that Berra often wondered aloud about strategic decisions, asking, "Should I bunt? Should I steal?"

Despite these difficulties, the Yankees were still contenders. Mantle came back from his early injury and, while still suffering from it (in addition to continuing pain from older injuries), continued to play well, leading the team in home runs and runs batted in with 35 and 111, respectively. Those numbers were impressive in an off year for hitters following recent pitcher-friendly rule changes; it was Mantle's last good season. Elston Howard, the team's first African American player, also avoided injury and put up the team's best batting average, .313. Despite their complaints of overwork, the relievers combined for a record of 20–7, with 15 saves during the summer months. By early August, the Yankees, despite winning fewer games and winning less overwhelmingly than they had in recent years, were in a tight battle for the pennant with the Baltimore Orioles and Chicago White Sox.

==== Efforts to replace Berra ====
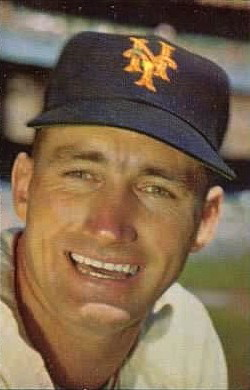
Alvin Dark, c. 1953

By that time, the team's management had heard the players' complaints and the stories about the lack of discipline. The American League had queried the other nine teams about whether they would approve the sale of the Yankees to the CBS television network, the first word outside the two parties about a transaction that had been in the works since around the time Berra had been offered the manager's position; Topping and Webb did not want any negative publicity to disrupt the deal. According to sportswriter Joe Trimble, around August 12 Houk discreetly contacted Alvin Dark, then manager of the San Francisco Giants, about taking over from Berra after the season.

Dark was respected as a manager, and popular in New York from his days as a player when the Giants had been in that city, but he had also been involved in a recent controversy over a remark one accuser claimed he had made suggesting that the team's African-American and Latino players were not as "mentally alert" as their white counterparts. Dark insisted he had been misquoted, and many of his players defended him, but the publicity reportedly prevented the Yankees from offering him the job. Since any such negotiations before the end of the season would have violated baseball's strict anti-tampering rules, no records exist and thus it is also uncertain if, at that time, the team had definitely decided to replace Berra.

With Dark out of the picture, the team reportedly made another effort to line up a replacement. Houk supposedly took advantage of a road trip to Kansas City late in the month to travel across Missouri and secretly meet with St. Louis Cardinals manager Johnny Keane, who was also reportedly having difficulty with some of his team's stars and seemed to be likely to be replaced himself after Gussie Busch, CEO of team owner Anheuser–Busch and team president, had fired general manager Bing Devine earlier in the month; word that Busch had already talked to onetime New York Giants manager Leo Durocher about taking over had leaked, alienating Keane. The Cardinals were floundering, and seemed unlikely at that time to win the National League pennant. It is not known what the outcome of this meeting was or even if it actually took place.

The Yankees were also playing poorly by this point. On August 17, they arrived in Comiskey Park for a four-game series with the White Sox which had the potential to give either team the upper hand in the pennant race, at least in regard to one another. The Yankees had lost 6 of the 11 preceding games. Chicago won all four games in this series, including the final game on August 20, holding the Yankees scoreless as they got five runs off Ford in three innings.

== Incident ==
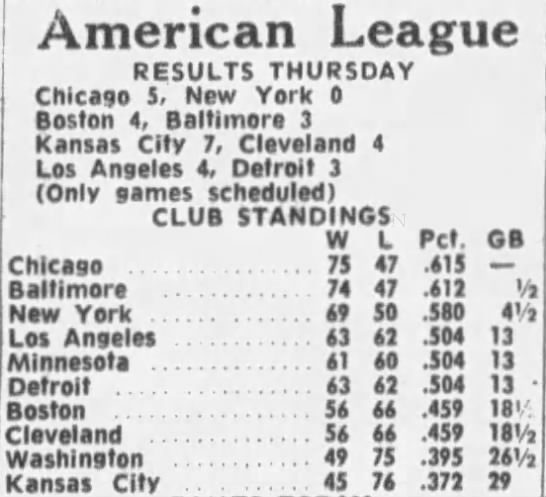
American League baseball standings following games of August 20, 1964

After the last game, the Yankees dressed and got on the team bus to travel to O'Hare International Airport, from where they flew to Boston for another four-game series against their archrivals, the Red Sox. The mood on board was generally subdued, almost somber. The sweep had dropped the Yankees to 4 1/2 games behind the White Sox, down into third place behind Baltimore. It did not seem likely that the Yankees could make up for the lost ground in the remaining weeks of the season no matter how well they played. "It looked like we were out of it", Clete Boyer recalled. "We figured Chicago and Baltimore couldn't both go into slumps".

The discomfort was further increased when the bus became stuck in traffic in hot weather. At the back, utility infielder Phil Linz was particularly upset, not only by the team's dire situation but because he had not played. Earlier in the season, he had played third when Berra had benched Boyer, shortstop while Tony Kubek had been injured, and briefly in the outfield when the starters were injured. He had hit very well against the White Sox pitchers, particularly their left-handers, and had taken a 10-game hitting streak into the series that had just concluded, yet he had remained on the bench during all four losses, with Berra declining to use him even as a pinch hitter.

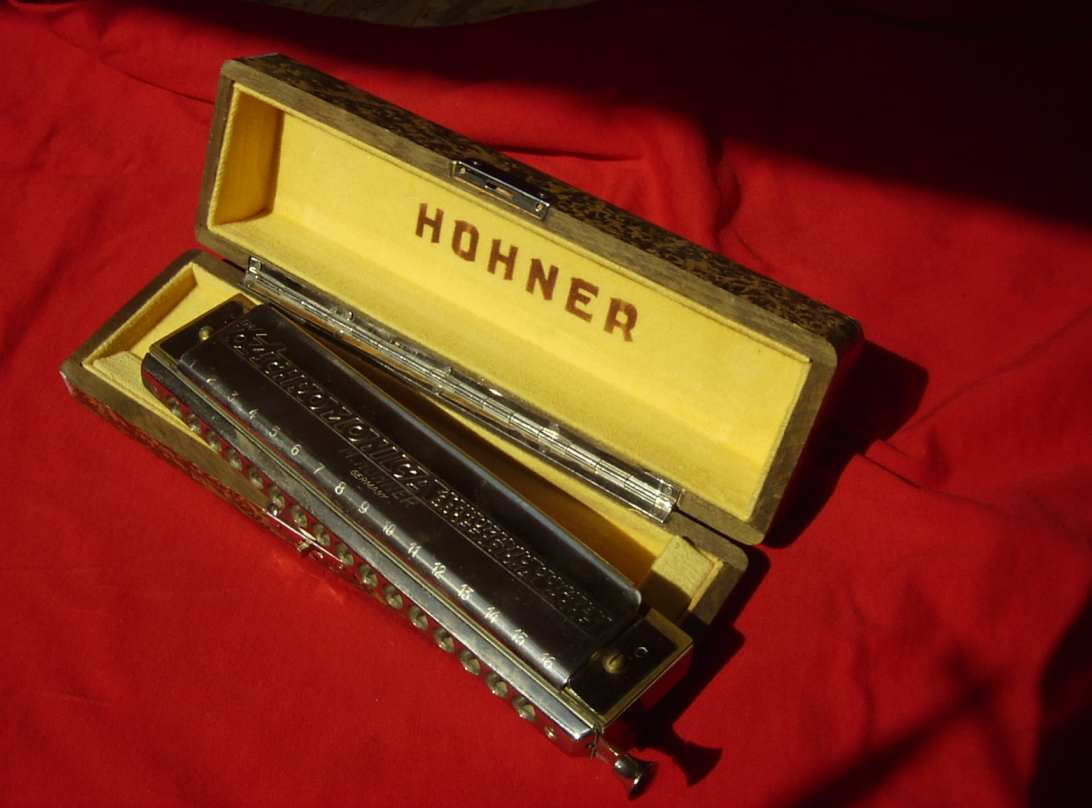
A Hohner hamonica

"If there was any team you would play me against, it would be the White Sox", Linz said later. By his own account, into which he admits he has incorporated others' reminiscences over the years, he was "resentful", but he was also aware that despite his hitting success, his fielding had been deficient, and he believes the pitchers had complained to the manager. "Yogi started getting pressure to put Tony Kubek back in. Somebody—maybe Whitey Ford—said 'You've got to get Phil out of there'".

Two hours after the game, the bus was making little progress, and Linz was still visibly upset, according to Jim Bouton, who often sat near him. To take his mind off his resentment, he pulled out a Hohner harmonica he had bought the day before when he ran into Tom Tresh and Kubek doing the same at Marshall Field's department store. (Note: Linz has changed his story about what he was doing there when he ran into his teammates. At the time, they said they had been inspired by a recent visit to the Billy Graham Center outside Chicago to learn some hymns. However, Linz later admitted he was at the store because he and his teammates had found department stores were a good place to meet women.) Not knowing how to play the instrument, he also took out its by-the-numbers instruction booklet and began attempting to play the easiest song in it, "Mary Had a Little Lamb".

He played very slowly, following the directions in the booklet. He also tried to play it quietly, which Bouton suggested may have complicated matters given the team's mood. "If 'Mary Had a Little Lamb' can sound like a dirge, it did", he wrote later.

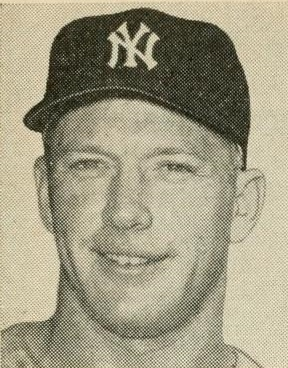
Mickey Mantle, c. 1962

In the front of the otherwise quiet bus, Berra, seated with the team's other coaches, heard the harmonica playing, although he did not know who the player was. He did not think it was in any way appropriate behavior, especially after such a serious setback to the team's pennant chances. Accounts differ as to whether he knew at the time it was Linz, but it is agreed that Berra eventually said something in the general direction of the rear demanding that the harmonica playing stop.

Linz claims he did not hear exactly what his manager said, and asked Mickey Mantle, seated a few rows further forward, to repeat it. Mantle, who often played little jokes on his teammates, told Linz that Berra had asked him to play it louder, which Linz did. This in turn led Berra to get out of his seat and go to the back of the bus, supposedly yelling at Linz to "shove [it] up your ass! You'd think you just won four straight!"

As Berra confronted Linz, the harmonica for some reason—either Linz threw it to Berra or at him, or Berra knocked it out of his hand—became airborne. It struck first baseman Joe Pepitone in the knee strongly enough to cut him. When it did, Pepitone humorously began feigning a more serious injury and yelling "Corpsman! Corpsman!" among other things.

With Berra now standing over him and, Linz believed, about to strike him, Linz stood up and shouted at him. "What are you getting on me for?" he said. "I give one hundred percent! Why don't you talk to some of these guys who aren't hustling?" "I was really an asshole", he later admitted.

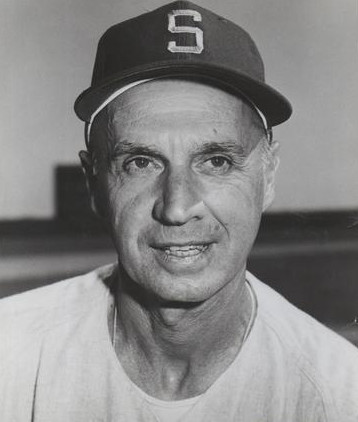
Frank Crosetti, c. 1969

All the passengers on the bus were now laughing, except for Berra and Frank Crosetti, the third baseman on the 1930s Yankees teams who was now a coach himself. As Berra returned to his seat promising to deal with Linz later, Crosetti raised his high-pitched voice and told Linz he was acting like a child. Linz, who admitted to disliking Crosetti, first because he was "kind of an old-timer and a little cranky" and second because he often was hard on backup players like Linz while avoiding confrontations with stars, shouted, "Fuck you, Crow!" in response, further amusing the bus. Soon afterwards, Crosetti told the reporters who were traveling with the team that this insubordination was the worst thing he had ever seen in 33 years with the Yankees. "It was hard not to laugh", Bouton, who heard the remark, recalled to Rob Neyer 50 years later. "This was really the worst thing ever? In the history of the franchise?"

Mantle picked up the harmonica and turned to Whitey Ford, who was sitting across the aisle. "It looks like I'm going to be managing this club pretty soon", he said, continuing his playful mood. "You can be my third base coach". He demonstrated how they would use the harmonica to relay signals to batters and runners. "One toot, that's a bunt. Two toots, that's a hit and run".

== Aftermath ==
The incident had very different effects on Berra's relationship with the players and team management.

=== Effect on players ===
Either on the plane or after the Yankees reached Boston, Linz went to Berra and apologized. "Forget about it", the manager said, but the two nevertheless shook hands and embraced. However, Berra knew from his experience of the 1957 incident at the Copacabana nightclub, where teammate Billy Martin's birthday party had led to a brawl with some other patrons over racial slurs some non-Yankees had directed at Sammy Davis Jr. and (ultimately) to Martin being traded, that any player who brought negative publicity to the team had to be fined, regardless of blame. "Phil", he said, "with all the writers there, I have to fine you. How much do you think it should be?" Linz replied that Berra was the manager and should set the amount. He suggested $250 ($3,000 in modern dollars) and Linz agreed. "We were friends after that", the infielder recalled.

By the time the Yankees reached Boston, the reporters on the bus had gotten the story out, and it had received national attention. The Yankees' sale to CBS had been announced, and writers jokingly asked if Linz would get a record contract as well. A radio station sent each Yankees player a harmonica; Linz got ten mailed to him, plus checks totaling $65 to help cover the fine. Hohner, which reported a sharp increase in sales, signed Linz to a $5,000 ($52,000 in modern dollars) endorsement deal, more than offsetting his fine. Joe Pepitone later joked that Linz should have brought a piano along on the bus so he would have made even more money. In the earliest known preserved segment of color video from The Tonight Show starring Johnny Carson, Carson devotes a significant portion his monologue to the incident, including a direct jab at CBS.

"That would be funny, wouldn't it?" Houk commented in the press on reports that one Boston radio station was urging fans to bring harmonicas and kazoos to the games at Fenway Park to taunt Linz. He added, however, that he did not think Linz should have played the harmonica when he did. When the Yankees played the Mets in the Mayor's Trophy Game, an annual exhibition contest between the two teams, some of the Mets threw harmonicas onto the field. Linz suspected the action had been organized by one Met in particular, Tracy Stallard, his roommate at the time.

On the field, at first the incident seemed to be a distraction as the Yankees continued as they had in Chicago, being shut out again in the first game and losing the next by a 5–3 margin, extending their losing streak to six. In the third game, rookie pitcher Mel Stottlemyre, who had snapped two other Yankee losing streaks in his August starts, held the Sox scoreless as Mantle, Maris, and Blanchard hit home runs en route to an 8–0 victory. Another Mantle home run helped Jim Bouton split the series for the Yankees the next day.

These two wins were the start of a 22–6 run over the next four weeks. The White Sox lost three of four to Baltimore following their sweep of the Yankees, evening up the pennant race, but the Orioles were unable to build momentum from this; during a game in Boston before that, their star first baseman, Boog Powell, had chipped a bone after running into a wall at Fenway, putting him on the disabled list for three weeks. The Orioles slumped to 10–9 without him.

The following weekend, the Yankees swept the Red Sox at home, while the White Sox and the Orioles split a series of their own. "That's when we knew we had a chance", Clete Boyer later recalled. At the end of August, the Orioles' lead was only three games.

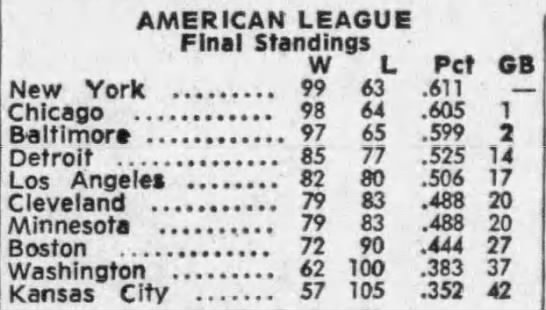
Final standings of the American League's 1964 season

By the end of the season, the Yankees were 30–11 since the end of the White Sox' sweep. The surge was enough to put them in first place, one game ahead of Chicago, thus becoming league champions once again. Players and writers credited the Harmonica Incident with sparking the team's turnaround. "It will be told over and over for years to come how the 'dead' Yankees were revived and the 1964 pennant won because the manager, Yogi Berra, got mad at Phil Linz's harmonica playing on a bus", Leonard Koppett predicted. Linz has speculated that his implicit criticism of his teammates' lack of effort when he responded to Berra on the bus "may have hit home with some of those guys".

It also helped establish Berra's role as the team manager with his players. "Out of that came the realization that Yogi was in charge", said second baseman Bobby Richardson. Years later, Mantle agreed: "In our eyes, that was the first time Yogi showed us all his leadership qualities ... From then on the players showed more respect for [him]. They had seen his temper and believed he had drawn a line". Whitey Ford agreed that "this incident showed us he could be tough when he had to". For his part, Berra repeatedly reassured the players when things seemed tough during September that "the world ain't come to an end yet", an early version of the more frequently quoted "It ain't over till it's over" that he told his Mets team during a similarly tight race in 1973.

=== Effect on management ===
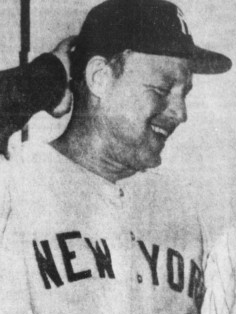
Ralph Houk in 1962

Although Houk did his part to assist the Yankees' surge by making a late trade with the Cleveland Indians early in September for Pedro Ramos, bringing some badly needed help to the bullpen, he and the other front-office executives did not share the players' newfound respect for Berra. The Harmonica Incident had dominated the sports pages just as news of the team's proposed sale to CBS had broken, a sale which was both controversial in and of itself, as not only was it the first time a major corporation had taken a majority stake in a Major League Baseball team, but there were also issues with the potential conflict of interest with a television network having a vote on the sport's lucrative television contract. White Sox owner Arthur Allyn Jr. had voted against the deal because he said he had been given only three hours in the middle of the night to consider it before voting; while his vote (along with that of the Kansas City A's Charlie Finley, who had a longtime grudge against the Yankees) was not enough to stop the deal, the negative publicity convinced the league to hold another vote later in the month, with the result remaining the same.

The Yankees did not need the additional negative publicity the incident brought, especially in light of the doubts it raised about Berra's ability to manage his former teammates effectively. Houk decided sometime in early September, before it was evident that the team had united behind their manager and was turning its season around, that Berra had to be replaced. Through an intermediary, he let Keane know he could manage the Yankees the next season. The Cardinals' manager, who had never forgiven Busch for talking to Durocher, accepted.

The planned management changeover became more awkward during September. Not only did the Yankees come back and win the pennant, but the Cardinals, 11 games out of first place in early August, also managed to do the same thing as the Philadelphia Phillies, who, in first place for much of the year, blew a 6 1/2-game lead with two weeks remaining, the final act in that team's infamous "Phold". On the last day of the season, the Cards clinched the National League pennant, averting a possible three-way playoff.

=== Replacement of Berra by Keane ===
The Cardinals won the 1964 World Series, defeating the Yankees in seven games. Afterwards, the two teams held end-of-season news conferences. In St. Louis, Busch, who had changed his mind about letting Keane go after the Series win and was prepared to offer him a raise and a two-year extension, instead had to announce to reporters that Keane had handed in a letter of resignation immediately beforehand. The letter was backdated to the end of the regular season, and Keane explained that he had been talking over this decision with his wife shortly before then. He said he had no immediate plans beyond going fishing.

Shortly afterwards, New York reporters, who assumed that the team would announce that Berra was being rehired for at least the next season, were taken by surprise when Houk instead announced that Berra had been fired. Asked who would replace him, Houk admitted that Dark was under consideration, and appeared surprised when he learned that Keane had abruptly resigned, saying that now that he was aware Keane was available, he too would be under consideration.

Houk denied that losing the Series had led to Berra's dismissal. He declined to elaborate on the reasons for the firing, saying only that "it was better for all concerned". Berra remained with the team as a "special field consultant", primarily doing scouting work on other teams and prospective trades during the regular season. He was free to leave if another team offered him a position. "I don't mind", Berra said, when reached at a New Jersey golf course and told of the events. "I'll be spending the year at home. Where can you get a job like this? I don't have to sign in or punch a clock. And the pay is good".

Reports immediately circulated that Keane would be hired, and that he had, in fact, already accepted the position before the season ended. Four days later, Keane was formally announced as the Yankees' new manager. According to Houk, he was signed to a one-year contract; his salary was not disclosed but reportedly was better than what the Cardinals had offered him. Some reporters found the circumstances suspicious and did not believe that Keane's sudden availability was a coincidence; Newsday columnist Stan Isaacs called Houk "the number-one charlatan, mountebank, quack, fop, fraud and ass of the sporting panorama". Fan reaction was overwhelmingly negative; some even wrote to Commissioner Ford C. Frick to complain.

It has been speculated in the subsequent years that Houk had more to do with Berra's firing than anyone above him, and that his reasons were more personal. "Houk didn't think Yogi was a good manager. Houk never backed Yogi up. Also, Yogi had not been Houk's choice", said Jim Bouton, who adds that Houk's biggest mistake was listening to the players who went to his office to complain, something that neither of his predecessors as manager nor general manager would have tolerated. "He never said, 'Mind your own business, and get the hell out of here'".

Clete Boyer was even more critical. "The truth was that Houk was jealous of Yogi", he said. "Houk had been nothing but a scrub, a backup for years, and he resented the fact that Yogi was a much greater player and much more popular. And, in my opinion, just as good a manager".

As spring training began for the Yankees' next season, Houk spoke at some length about the turn of events at the end of the previous season. He called hiring Berra "his biggest mistake" as general manager. "The plain truth is that he was not ready to manage ... Nobody was more disappointed than I was". While he admitted that the decision to fire Berra had been made in late August, he denied the Harmonica Incident had anything to do with it. He would not discuss the actual reasons either, except to say that "they were very good ones".

Not everyone believed him then, or even now. Jim Bouton told Rob Neyer in 2014 that he believed the decision to fire Berra had been made "maybe right after Phil Linz decided to play his harmonica in Chicago". Linz has said that he felt "partially responsible" for some time afterwards, but by 2013 he no longer believed it had been his fault. "I'm pretty sure from what I've heard that the Yankees had made a decision before that had happened".

=== 1965 season ===
There were no changes to the Yankees' roster in the offseason as significant as the management change, and many of the players believed they had a good chance at becoming league champions again and winning another Series. Looking over the team in spring training, Keane told a fellow coach that he had "never had so many good ballplayers" and should not have to change anything they did. Nonetheless, he installed rules which ended up antagonizing a number of players. A career minor leaguer who had never played in the majors before managing there, Keane tried to instill the same work ethic and practice habits that had kept him playing. Many of the Yankees, who felt they had already established themselves and had never been treated that way by Berra, Houk, or Stengel, resented him as an outsider.

The cultural clash between Keane and the Yankees was even deeper when it came to off-field activities. "Johnny Keane was the wrong guy for so many reasons", Bouton recalled in his 2014 interview. "[We] were a party team. We out-drank, out-ate everybody, would be out carousing". Keane, on the other hand, was devoutly religious and imposed curfews and other strict rules on the team. Said Bouton, "I don't remember if I said this first or someone else did, but hiring Johnny Keane was like putting Billy Graham in charge of the Hells Angels". At one point he attempted to make an example of a hungover Mickey Mantle by making him shag fly balls endlessly until Mantle retaliated by throwing the ball toward Keane's head. "When we did talk, there were no arguments", Mantle recalled. "More often than not, we had staring contests".

Injuries plagued the team as they had the year before, but Keane, who Bouton said "thought the players were babying themselves too much", made some play anyway. In conjunction with upper management, he concealed from Roger Maris the information that he had broken his hand until late in the season, an injury that left him unable to grip a bat as tightly as he had before. Elston Howard had to keep playing despite an arm injury, and the stress on Tony Kubek's bad back forced him into retirement at the end of the season. Bouton also pitched most of the season with a sore arm, which he later realized had led to permanent damage.

The effect of the injuries on the team made some of Berra's moves the year before more understandable. He had played Mantle at first, and rested him regularly to keep him at his healthiest when he did play; Keane's decision to play Mantle in the outfield without a break clearly had a deleterious effect on the star. Kubek and Boyer's injuries were also aggravated by their lack of rest.

The Yankees ultimately finished the season in sixth place at 77–85, the first time in 40 years they had a losing record. After the team started the next season with only 4 wins in its first 20 games, Keane was fired. Houk returned to the dugout to manage but was unable to turn the season around, and the Yankees finished 70–89, in last place for the first time since 1912.

The Yankees did not win the pennant again until 1976, three years after CBS sold the team to George Steinbrenner at a loss. Berra, who had coached and managed the New York Mets to the 1973 World Series in the interim, returned to the Yankees as a coach that season under manager Billy Martin, a teammate on the 1950s Yankees teams. In 1983, he succeeded Martin as manager.

== Legacy ==
In the years since the Harmonica Incident, it has been remembered both as the beginning of the Yankees' 1964 comeback and the harbinger of the team's collapse over the next two seasons. In 2005, Bobby Richardson recalled that there were some ways during that season in which "the team concept was eroding a bit". When it came to dividing World Series shares, he notes, the players did not give as much to younger players and the team's clubhouse attendants as they had in previous years. Even Berra, he says, was not immune—on the way home from St. Louis after the Series loss, he asked Richardson and Richardson's wife if he should ask for a two-year contract, and they agreed.

Berra never did the scouting his post-managerial contract called for. Within a week of his firing, he was contacted by the Mets and offered a coaching position with them, which he accepted, reuniting him and Stengel. He also returned to the lineup for four games; after performing poorly, he retired as a player for good.

Linz, who appeared in a Hohner ad with the line "Play it again, Phil" on the back of the Yankees' 1965 yearbook, was traded to the Phillies after the 1965 season. That team eventually traded him to the Mets in 1968, where he was reunited with Berra. The two posed for a humorous picture with Linz playing the harmonica and Berra covering his ears and smiling; Linz later used the picture on his business cards.

That season was Linz's last. "If people remember me at all", he recalled in 2013, "they remember me as a harmonica player, because I sure wasn't too good of a baseball player". As of 2015, he still had the harmonica and could play "Mary Had a Little Lamb" more expertly.

Ralph Houk managed the Yankees through the end of the 1973 season, never having done better than a second-place finish in the American League East in 1970. He later managed the Detroit Tigers and Boston Red Sox during transitional periods that did not see either team reach the postseason. Upon Houk's death in 2010, Berra biographer Allen Barra reminded readers of Houk's role in Berra's 1964 firing. "Yes, Ralph Houk was a brave man and risked his life for his country at Normandy", he wrote. "But that doesn't excuse his complicity in a moment in Yankee history more shameful than anything perpetrated by George Steinbrenner".

=== Berra's later career ===
Berra stayed with the Mets as a coach through several other managerial changes, sharing in that team's 1969 World Series victory under manager Gil Hodges. After Hodges' death during spring training in 1972, Berra was named his successor. Despite significant injuries to some of the team's best position players, the Mets finished the season in third place, with a record of 83–73 in a strike-shortened season, an improvement upon their 83-79 record in Gil Hodges's final campaign. Also in 1972, Yogi was inducted into the Hall of Fame. The following season, he oversaw another comeback much like the 1964 Yankees, only more impressive. With the Mets 10 games under .500 and seemingly out of it on August 30, the team rebounded by going 21–8 the rest of the way, winning the division, then upsetting the heavily favored Cincinnati Reds in the National League Championship Series, before losing to the Oakland A's in a close seven game World Series.

Clete Boyer has said that that achievement should put to rest any of the doubts about Berra's managerial acumen which were used to justify his dismissal. He told Berra biographer Allan Barra:

I'm going to tell you something that should have been said a long time ago, and I mean no disrespect to any of the guys I played with. We weren't the best team in the league in 1964. We got to the World Series and damn near won it because, in the end, Yogi had faith in us and we had faith in him. And you know what? He did the same thing with the New York Mets in 1973, and no one's going to tell me that they were the best team in the National League that year. Now don't tell me it's just a coincidence that he did that twice.

In 1974, shortly before his death, former Yankees' co-owner Del Webb relayed a message through his doctor, who also occasionally saw Berra, that he had made a mistake in firing Yogi.

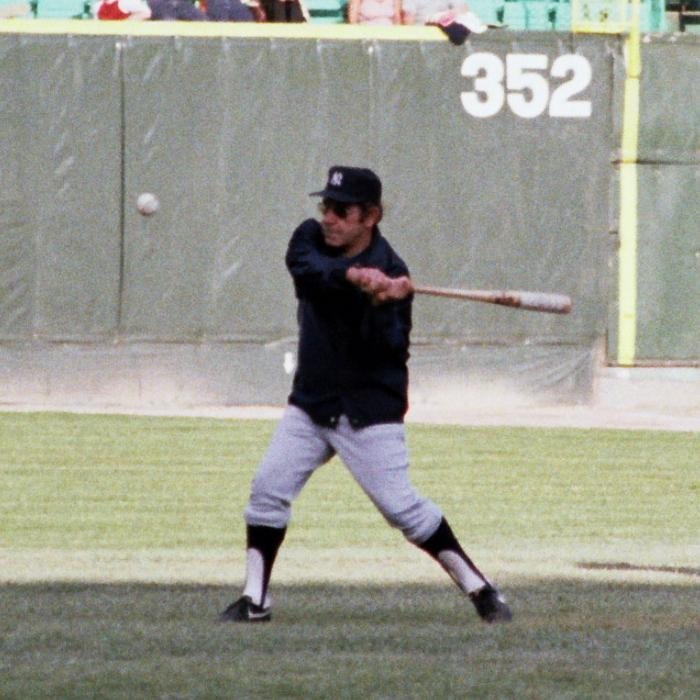
Berra as a Yankees coach in 1981

After overachieving with the Mets in 1973, Yogi received a three-year extension from the club. The 1974 Mets finished 71-91, good for fifth place in the six-team National League East. The Mets struggled in 1975. On August 5 of that year, after a number of players complained to the front office about Yogi, and just days after a major blowup with declining outfielder Cleon Jones, Yogi was let go, with the team's record at 56-53. Yogi's replacement, Roy McMillan, guided the club to a 26–27 record the rest of the way.

Yogi returned to the Yankees as a coach the next season under former teammate Billy Martin to win the pennant again and return to the World Series, albeit to be swept by the Cincinnati Reds (the coincidence of those two occurrences has been noted). The Yankees then won both the 1977 and 1978 World Series, the first with Martin as manager, the next after Bob Lemon replaced Martin during the 1978 season. Berra remained as a coach throughout that time, as well as through the team's numerous managerial changes of the early 1980s.

After the Martin-led Yankees finished with 91 wins in 1983, Martin was again dismissed by George Steinbrenner, who had bought the team from CBS ten years earlier; he then promoted Berra to the manager's position. The fans were happy to see Berra at long last given a second chance; the players liked him as much as their 1964 counterparts had, while many had tired of Martin's intensity and erratic behavior. The 1984 season followed the same pattern as 1964 and 1973 had under Yogi: A slow start, followed by the best record in baseball after the All-Star break. The team finished 87–75 in 1984, 17 games behind the first-place Detroit Tigers, which had dominated all year and went on to win the World Series.

Despite the second-place finish, the Yankees had never been in contention, and Berra was concerned that the mercurial Steinbrenner might decide to make a change. Before the next season, Berra sought assurances that he would be allowed to manage the season out, and Steinbrenner responded by publicly guaranteeing that "Yogi is the manager, win or lose". Notwithstanding that promise, he fired Berra 16 games into the season, rehiring Martin. The players reacted angrily, so much so that when Martin hired former Tigers outfielder Willie Horton as a coach, insiders said Horton's real purpose was to be Martin's bodyguard should he and player Don Baylor fight.

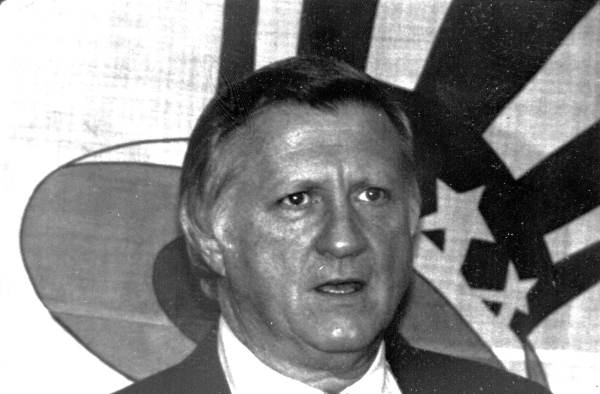
George Steinbrenner, c. 1980

Steinbrenner did not personally inform Berra that he had been fired, instead leaving that task to general manager Clyde King. The GM broke the news to Berra in the visiting manager's office at Comiskey Park, where the Yankees had once again been swept by the White Sox. Players, who had heard the news, were nevertheless surprised to find Berra seated in the front of the team bus, which let him off at O'Hare where he flew back to New York.

In 1964, Berra had reportedly taken the firing personally, but knew better than to be angry about it publicly. While Berra's initial comments were extremely conciliatory, he ended up even angrier than he had been after the 1964 situation, since Steinbrenner had sent King to do the job rather than face Yogi as Topping and Webb had. He publicly vowed never to set foot in Yankee Stadium again as long as Steinbrenner owned the team.

That lasted until 1999, when Steinbrenner traveled from Florida to Berra's home in New Jersey to personally apologize for having not fired him in person 14 years before. Berra's return to the stadium shortly afterwards was celebrated as "Yogi Berra Day". Don Larsen, whose perfect game in the 1956 World Series he had caught, threw out the ceremonial first pitch to Berra. It was followed by Yankee pitcher David Cone throwing his own perfect game against the Montreal Expos.

== See also ==
- History of the New York Yankees
