= Yogi Berra Museum and Learning Center =

Museum at Montclair State University, NJ to honor Yogi Berra

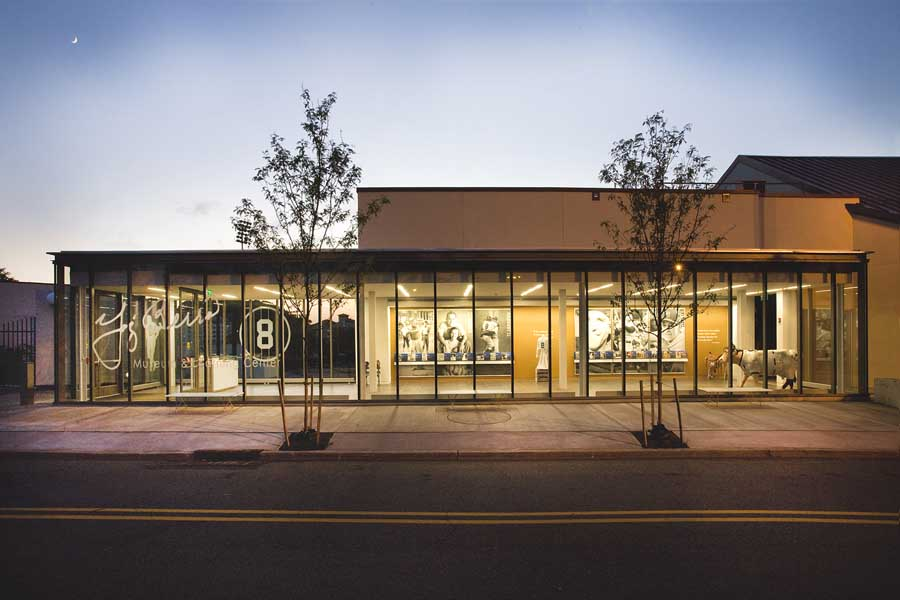
- Entrance to the Yogi Berra Museum and Learning Center
- Established: December 4, 1998
- Location: 8 Yogi Berra Drive; Little Falls, NJ 07424
- Architects: Terry H. Parker, AIA; Parker Associates
- Website: yogiberramuseum.org

The Yogi Berra Museum and Learning Center is a museum on the campus of Montclair State University in Little Falls, New Jersey. It serves to honor the career of Yogi Berra, who played for the New York Yankees and the New York Mets of Major League Baseball and was inducted into the National Baseball Hall of Fame. The museum, which contains artifacts from Berra's career, opened on December 4, 1998. It is adjacent to Yogi Berra Stadium.

== History ==
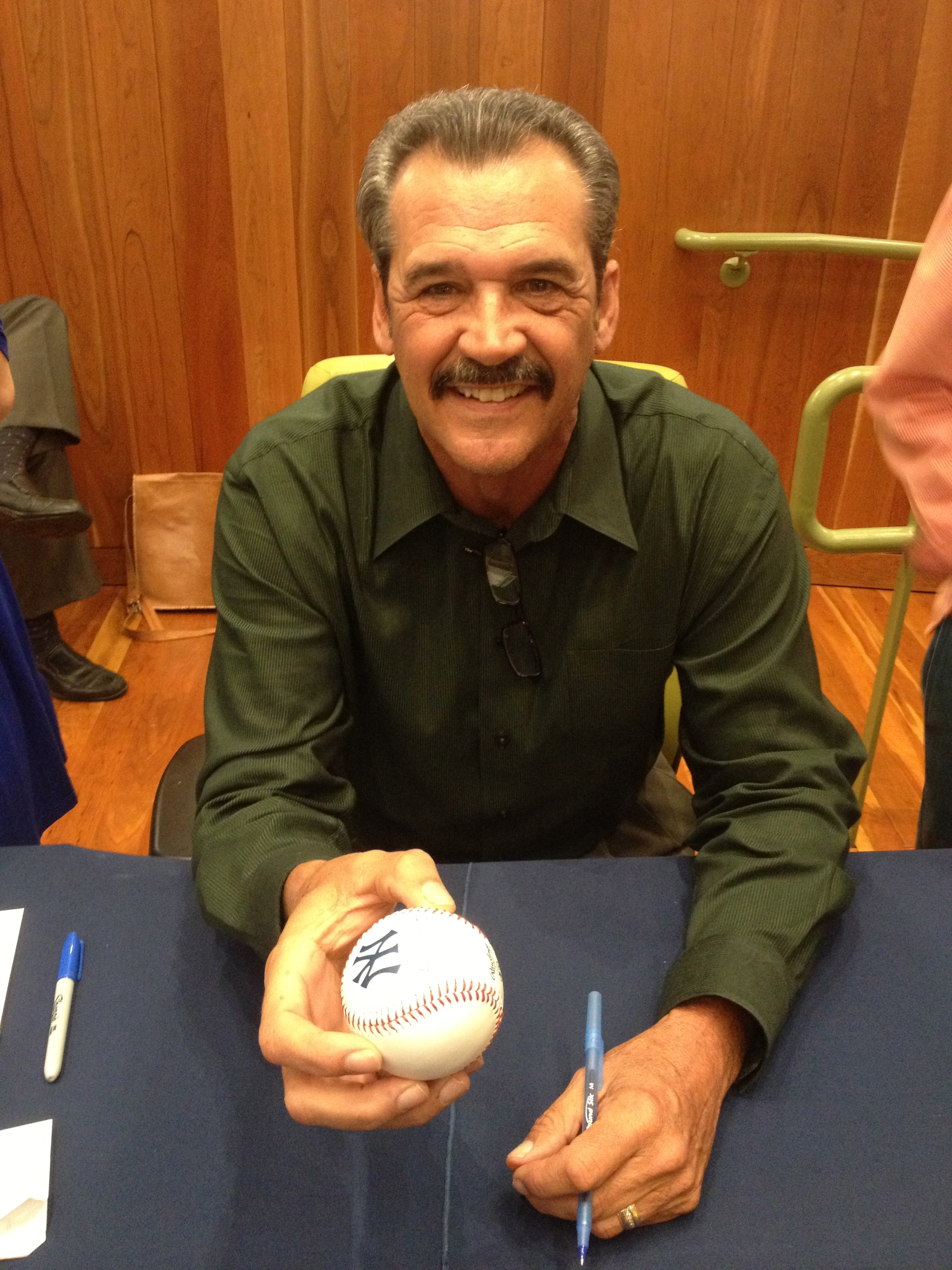
Ron Guidry autographing a baseball at the Yogi Berra Museum and Learning Center on May 12, 2013

"The Friends of Yogi Inc.", a nonprofit organization, raised $2 million through donations to build the museum to honor Yogi Berra, who played almost his entire Major League Baseball career for the New York Yankees. John McMullen, the owner of the New Jersey Devils of the National Hockey League, was among the museum's benefactors. The museum was built adjacent to Yogi Berra Stadium, which hosted the New Jersey Jackals, a Minor League Baseball team in the Frontier League, from 1998 to 2022 and is the home field of the Montclair State Red Hawks baseball team. The museum was dedicated in October 1998, with fellow Baseball Hall of Famers Ted Williams and Larry Doby in attendance. It opened to the public on December 4 later that year. In 2010, IKON 5 Architects redesigned the museum and world-renowned sculptor Brian Hanlon of Toms River, New Jersey sculpted a statue of Berra that was placed in front of the museum.

Berra had feuded with Yankees' owner George Steinbrenner since Steinbrenner fired him 16 games into the 1985 season. Berra refused to be involved in Yankees events, including Yankees games. In January 1999, Berra and Steinbrenner resolved their feud with a public event at the Yogi Berra Museum.

Berra frequently visited the museum for signings, discussions, and other events. It was his intention to teach children important values such as sportsmanship and dedication, both on and off the baseball diamond.

On October 8, 2014, a burglary occurred at the museum, in which a team of "professional" thieves stole specific pieces of Berra's memorabilia.

== Exhibits ==
The museum contains items from Berra's career, including baseball cards, a jacket worn by Berra while throwing out the first pitch of Game 1 of the 2009 World Series, two of his MLB MVP awards, and all 10 World Series rings he received as a player. Following the resolution of Berra's feud with Steinbrenner, the Yankees loaned the Commissioner's Trophy from the 1998 World Series to the museum.

In 2013, the museum teamed up with Athlete Ally to develop an exhibit called "Championing Respect", which aims to support the inclusion of LGBT athletes in sports. An exhibit in 2014 celebrated the 75th anniversary of Lou Gehrig's farewell speech.

The Museum offers a wide range of school and public programs on all aspects of sports and society. It conducts guided school tours and education programs, provides off-site assemblies on anti-bullying and sportsmanship, and also collaborates with Montclair State University on programs examining topical issues in media and sports.

In promoting the values of respect and sportsmanship, the Museum, in partnership with Investors Bank and the Super Essex Conference, developed a Best Teammate Award program in 2013, recognizing outstanding leadership by student-athletes.

The Museum also offers an array of summer camps, including youth baseball and softball camps.
