= Phil Linz =

American baseball player (1939–2020)

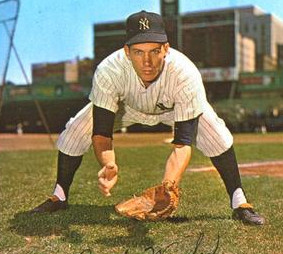
- Linz, circa 1964–65
- Infielder
- Born: June 4, 1939; Baltimore, Maryland, U.S.
- Died: December 9, 2020 (aged 81); Leesburg, Virginia, U.S.
- Batted: Right Threw: Right

MLB debut
- April 13, 1962, for the New York Yankees

Last MLB appearance
- September 29, 1968, for the New York Mets

MLB statistics
- Batting average: .235
- Home runs: 11
- Runs batted in: 96
- Stats at Baseball Reference

Teams
- New York Yankees (1962–1965); Philadelphia Phillies (1966–1967); New York Mets (1967–1968)

Career highlights and awards
- World Series champion (1962)

Philip Francis Linz (June 4, 1939 – December 9, 2020) was an American professional baseball player. Linz played in Major League Baseball for the New York Yankees (1962–65), Philadelphia Phillies (1966–67), and New York Mets (1967–68). He batted and threw right-handed, and was listed at 6 feet (72 in) and 180 pounds (82 kg), during his playing days.

The utility player was more likely remembered for the infamous (Yankees) "Harmonica Incident" than anything he accomplished in his seven-year major league career.

== New York Yankees ==
After five years in the New York Yankees' farm system, in which he batted .304 with fifteen home runs mostly at shortstop, Linz made the big league club out of Spring training 1962. Used exclusively as a pinch hitter or pinch runner up to that point, he made his first appearance on the field on May 23 at third base after Clete Boyer was hit by a pitch, and taken out of the game. In his second at bat, with the Yankees trailing 7–2, Linz hit a two-run home run. He also singled in two runs and scored a run in the Yankees' nine run eighth inning that saw them take the lead, and win the game.

This performance earned Linz the start the next day, and he remained at third until Boyer returned on May 27. For the season, Linz batted .287 with one home run and fourteen runs batted in. He did not appear in the Yankees' World Series victory over the San Francisco Giants.

He became more of a utility player in 1963, making twelve appearances in the outfield. This increased versatility earned Linz a semi-regular position in the Yankees' line-up for 1964, when he made a career high 417 plate appearances. He also appeared in all seven games of the 1964 World Series, filling in for an injured Tony Kubek at short (David Halberstam, describing the series in his book October 1964, attributes the Yankee loss in part to the ineffectiveness of the Linz-Bobby Richardson combination in the middle of the Yankee infield.). He homered off Barney Schultz in game two, and Bob Gibson in the ninth inning of game seven, as the Yankees attempted a late comeback.

=== Harmonica incident ===
Following the 1963 season, Yankees General Manager Roy Hamey retired. Manager Ralph Houk moved into the GM position, while Yankees legend Yogi Berra assumed managerial responsibilities.

As recounted in Jim Bouton's book, Ball Four, following a Yankee road loss to the Chicago White Sox on August 20, 1964, Linz was playing a plaintive version of "Mary Had a Little Lamb" on his harmonica in the back of the team bus. Berra found the sad cowboy style mixed with a children's nursery rhyme a bit mocking of the team, and told Linz to pipe down. Linz didn't hear and kept playing. Berra became infuriated and called back from the front of the bus, "If you don't knock that off, I'm going to come back there and kick your ass." Linz couldn't hear the words over the music, so he asked Mickey Mantle, "What he say?" Mantle responded, "He said to play it louder." Berra walked to the back of the bus to confront Linz. By different accounts, Linz threw the harmonica to Berra or at him, or Berra knocked it out of his hand. Regardless, it became airborne, striking first baseman Joe Pepitone in the knee strongly enough to cut him.

This altercation convinced the Yankees' front office that Berra had lost control of the team, and could not command respect from his players. As a result, the decision was made to fire Berra at the end of the season regardless of the fact that the Yankees eventually won the American League pennant.

== Phillies and Mets ==
Linz played one season for new Yankees manager Johnny Keane. Following the 1965 season, he was traded to the Philadelphia Phillies for fellow utility player Ruben Amaro. He played very sparingly in Philadelphia, appearing in only 63 games over a season and a half. On July 11, 1967, he was traded to the New York Mets for second baseman Chuck Hiller. Linz's finest game as a Met came on May 25, 1968. Entering the game 0 for 25 for the season, Linz went three for four with two runs scored in a 9–1 drubbing of the Atlanta Braves.

== Career stats ==
Seasons	Games	PA	AB	Runs	Hits	2B	3B	HR	RBI	SB	BB	HBP	SO	Avg.	OBP	Slg.	Fld%
7	519	1518	1372	185	322	64	4	11	96	13	112	7	195	.235	.295	.311	.958

== Death ==
Linz died December 9, 2020, at a nursing home in Virginia. He was 81.
