= 1957 in baseball =

The following are the baseball events of the year 1957 throughout the world.

== Champions ==
=== Major League Baseball ===
- World Series: Milwaukee Braves over New York Yankees (4–3); Lew Burdette, MVP
- All-Star Game, July 9 at Busch Stadium: American League, 6–5

=== Other champions ===
- College World Series: California
- Japan Series: Nishitetsu Lions over Yomiuri Giants (4–0–1)
- Little League World Series: Monterrey Industrial, Monterrey, Mexico

Winter Leagues

- 1957 Caribbean Series: Tigres de Marianao
- Cuban League: Tigres de Marianao
- Dominican Republic League: Leones del Escogido
- Mexican Pacific League: Naranjeros de Hermosillo
- Panamanian League: Cerveza Balboa
- Puerto Rican League: Indios de Mayagüez
- Venezuelan League: Leones del Caracas
- Global World Series: Japan

== Awards and honors ==
- Baseball Hall of Fame
  - Sam Crawford
  - Joe McCarthy
- MLB Most Valuable Player Award
  - Hank Aaron (MIL, National)
  - Mickey Mantle (NYY, American)
- MLB Rookie of the Year Award
  - Jack Sanford (PHI, National)
  - Tony Kubek (NYY, American)
- Cy Young Award
  - Warren Spahn (MIL)
- The Sporting News Player of the Year Award
  - Ted Williams (BOS)
- The Sporting News Pitcher of the Year Award
  - Warren Spahn (MIL, National)
  - Billy Pierce (CWS, American)
- The Sporting News Rookie of the Year Award
  - Ed Bouchee (PHI, National player)
  - Tony Kubek (NYY, American player)
  - Jack Sanford (PHI, pitcher)
- The Sporting News Manager of the Year Award
  - Fred Hutchinson (STL)
- Gold Glove Award
  - (P) Bobby Shantz (NYY, AL)
  - (C) Sherm Lollar (CWS, AL)
  - (1B) Gil Hodges (BRO, NL)
  - (2B) Nellie Fox (CWS, AL)
  - (3B) Frank Malzone (BOS, AL)
  - (SS) Roy McMillan (CIN, NL)
  - (LF) Minnie Miñoso (CWS, AL)
  - (CF) Willie Mays (NYG, NL)
  - (RF) Al Kaline (DET, AL)

== Statistical leaders ==
| | American League | | National League | |
| Stat | Player | Total | Player | Total |
|---|---|---|---|---|
| AVG | Ted Williams (BOS) | .388 | Stan Musial (STL) | .351 |
| HR | Roy Sievers (WSH) | 42 | Hank Aaron (MIL) | 44 |
| RBI | Roy Sievers (WSH) | 114 | Hank Aaron (MIL) | 132 |
| W | Jim Bunning (DET); Billy Pierce (CWS) | 20 | Warren Spahn (MIL) | 21 |
| ERA | Bobby Shantz (NYY) | 2.45 | Johnny Podres (BRO) | 2.66 |
| K | Early Wynn (CLE) | 184 | Jack Sanford (PHI) | 188 |

== Major league baseball final standings ==
=== American League final standings ===
American League
| Team | W | L | Pct. | GB | Home | Road |
|---|---|---|---|---|---|---|
| New York Yankees | 98 | 56 | .636 | — | 48‍–‍29 | 50‍–‍27 |
| Chicago White Sox | 90 | 64 | .584 | 8 | 45‍–‍32 | 45‍–‍32 |
| Boston Red Sox | 82 | 72 | .532 | 16 | 44‍–‍33 | 38‍–‍39 |
| Detroit Tigers | 78 | 76 | .506 | 20 | 45‍–‍32 | 33‍–‍44 |
| Baltimore Orioles | 76 | 76 | .500 | 21 | 42‍–‍33 | 34‍–‍43 |
| Cleveland Indians | 76 | 77 | .497 | 21½ | 40‍–‍37 | 36‍–‍40 |
| Kansas City Athletics | 59 | 94 | .386 | 38½ | 37‍–‍40 | 22‍–‍54 |
| Washington Senators | 55 | 99 | .357 | 43 | 28‍–‍49 | 27‍–‍50 |

Locations of teams for the 1955–1960 American League seasons
American League

=== National League final standings ===
National League
| Team | W | L | Pct. | GB | Home | Road |
|---|---|---|---|---|---|---|
| Milwaukee Braves | 95 | 59 | .617 | — | 45‍–‍32 | 50‍–‍27 |
| St. Louis Cardinals | 87 | 67 | .565 | 8 | 42‍–‍35 | 45‍–‍32 |
| Brooklyn Dodgers | 84 | 70 | .545 | 11 | 43‍–‍34 | 41‍–‍36 |
| Cincinnati Redlegs | 80 | 74 | .519 | 15 | 45‍–‍32 | 35‍–‍42 |
| Philadelphia Phillies | 77 | 77 | .500 | 18 | 38‍–‍39 | 39‍–‍38 |
| New York Giants | 69 | 85 | .448 | 26 | 37‍–‍40 | 32‍–‍45 |
| Pittsburgh Pirates | 62 | 92 | .403 | 33 | 36‍–‍41 | 26‍–‍51 |
| Chicago Cubs | 62 | 92 | .403 | 33 | 31‍–‍46 | 31‍–‍46 |

Locations of teams for the 1953–1957 National League seasons
National League

== Nippon Professional Baseball final standings ==
=== Central League final standings ===
| Central League | G | W | L | T | Pct. | GB |
|---|---|---|---|---|---|---|
| Yomiuri Giants | 130 | 74 | 53 | 3 | .581 | — |
| Osaka Tigers | 130 | 73 | 54 | 3 | .573 | 1.0 |
| Chunichi Dragons | 130 | 70 | 57 | 3 | .569 | 4.0 |
| Kokutetsu Swallows | 130 | 58 | 68 | 4 | .462 | 15.5 |
| Hiroshima Carp | 130 | 54 | 75 | 1 | .419 | 21.0 |
| Taiyo Whales | 130 | 52 | 74 | 4 | .415 | 21.5 |

=== Pacific League final standings ===
| Pacific League | G | W | L | T | Pct. | GB |
|---|---|---|---|---|---|---|
| Nishitetsu Lions | 132 | 83 | 44 | 5 | .648 | — |
| Nankai Hawks | 132 | 78 | 53 | 1 | .595 | 7.0 |
| Mainichi Orions | 132 | 75 | 52 | 5 | .587 | 8.0 |
| Hankyu Braves | 132 | 71 | 55 | 6 | .561 | 11.5 |
| Toei Flyers | 132 | 56 | 73 | 3 | .436 | 28.0 |
| Kintetsu Pearls | 132 | 44 | 82 | 6 | .356 | 38.5 |
| Daiei Unions | 132 | 41 | 89 | 2 | .318 | 43.5 |

== Events ==
=== January ===
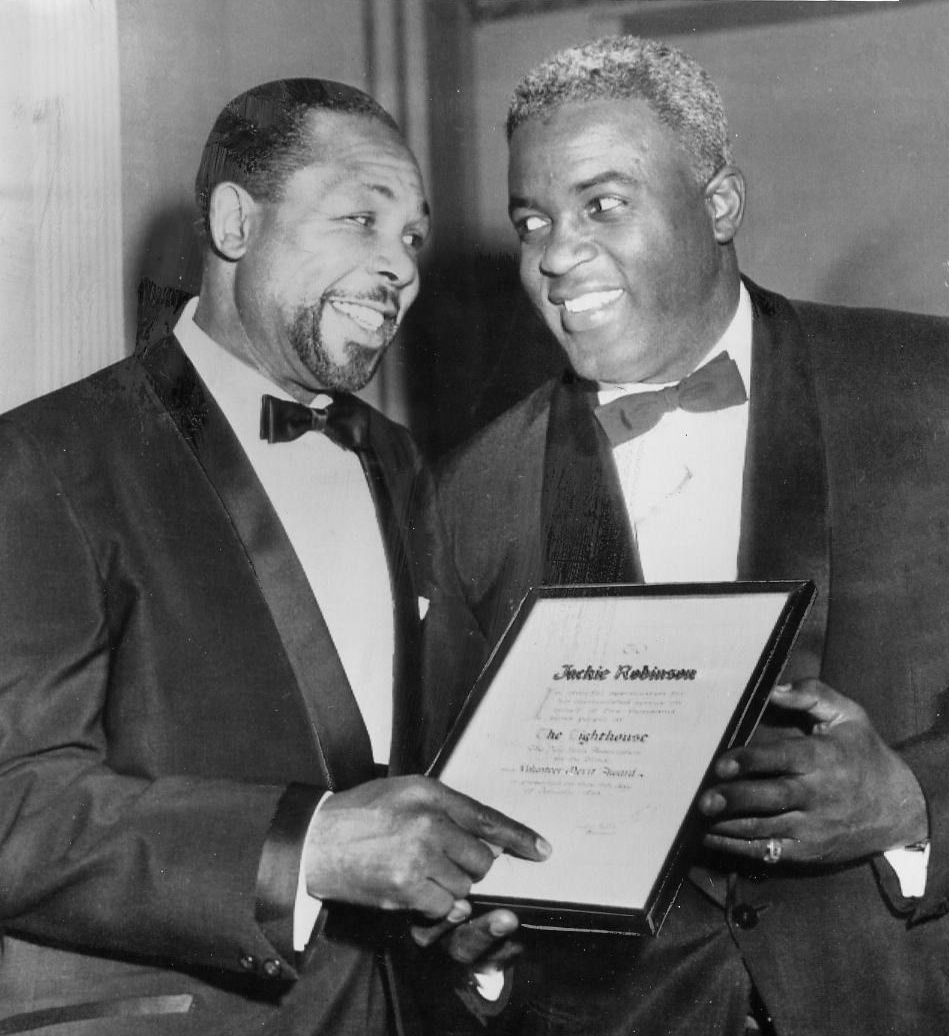
Jackie Robinson (right) two years after his retirement, with boxer Archie Moore

- January 2 – Centerfielder Willie Mays agrees to terms on his 1957 New York Giants contract for a reported $35,000 annual salary (valued at about $415,000 in 2026 dollars). Mays, 25, led the National League with 40 stolen bases in 1956 and slugged 38 homers, fifth in the league.
- January 6 – Newspaper headlines report that future Hall of Famer Jackie Robinson, who broke the baseball color line as the 20th century's first acknowledged Black player in "Organized Baseball" (1946) and Major League Baseball (1947), is retiring from the game at age 36, and will explain his decision in a Look Magazine article later this month. The seven-time All-Star and 1947 Major League Baseball Rookie of the Year, 1949 National League Valuable Player, and 1955 World Series champion had been traded from the Brooklyn Dodgers, for whom he starred for a decade, to the arch-rival New York Giants on December 13, 1956. On January 14, Robinson will officially notify Giants president Horace Stoneham in writing of his retirement, which nullifies the trade. He will enter private business as an executive with Chock Full o'Nuts, a coffee manufacturer.
- January 8 – The American Association of College Baseball Coaches votes to ban professional scouts from their campuses, in response to Organized Baseball's recent rescinding of the 11-year-old "college rule" that prohibited pro teams from "poaching" college talent.
- January 9 – The Cleveland Indians release eight-time American League All-Star pitcher Bob Feller. Feller, now 38, first joined Cleveland in 1936 as a 17-year-old. He would go on to post a 266–162 record with 2,581 strikeouts over 18 years with the team, losing 3½ years due to military service in World War II. His uniform #19 will be retired this coming season. Like Jackie Robinson, Feller will be enshrined in the Baseball Hall of Fame in 1962, his first year of eligibility.
- January 19 – General manager Frank Lane gives up on his controversial 1956 re-design of the St. Louis Cardinals' uniforms, announcing that the "two red birds on a gold bat" motif will return to the front of the club's home and road shirts this coming season. Lane claims that he underestimated fans' affection for the traditional uniforms, which were introduced during the 1920s.
- January 31 – Saying "I just can't do the job anymore," Al Rosen retires as an active player after ten seasons with the Cleveland Indians, four All-Star selections, two home run titles, and the 1953 AL Most Valuable Player Award. Third baseman Rosen, 32, smashed 192 home runs from 1950 through last season. He'll return to the game as a front-office executive in the 1970s.

=== February ===
- February 1 – The 16 MLB club owners vote to increase pension payments for retired players. The five-year agreement, funded by the sale of network radio and television rights to the World Series and All-Star Game, will pay $88 monthly to five-year veterans, $175/month to ten-year vets, and $275/month for players with 20 years of service, upon reaching age 50.
  - Tomorrow, MLB magnates will reject raising active players' minimum salary from $6,000 to $7,500 annually.
- February 3 – The Baseball Hall of Fame will welcome its 82nd and 83rd members this year, after its Veterans Committee elects retired outfielder "Wahoo Sam" Crawford, 76, and former manager "Marse Joe" McCarthy, 69, to the Cooperstown shrine. Crawford collected 2,961 hits during his early-century (1899–1917) career for the Cincinnati Reds and Detroit Tigers; McCarthy won nine pennants and seven World Series between 1926 and 1946 as skipper of the Chicago Cubs and New York Yankees.
- February 14 – Cuba (5–1) wins the ninth annual Caribbean Series, defeating runner-up Puerto Rico (3–3) by an 8–3 score. The Tigres de Marianao capture the championship for Cuba; outfielder Solly Drake is elected the series' Most Valuable Player.
- February 19 – The New York Yankees and Kansas City Athletics—destined to be frequent and often controversial trading partners during Arnold Johnson's tenure as owner of the Athletics—consummate a 13-player transaction. The Bombers deal pitchers Rip Coleman, Mickey McDermott, Tom Morgan and Jack Urban (player to be named later, or PTBNL), infielders Milt Graff and Billy Hunter, and outfielder Irv Noren to Kansas City for pitchers Art Ditmar, Bobby Shantz and Jack McMahan, first baseman Wayne Belardi, and infielders Clete Boyer (PTBNL) and Curt Roberts (PTBNL). Ditmar, Shantz and Boyer will have a hand in a combined seven AL pennants (1957–1958, 1960–1964) and three World Series (1958, 1961, 1962) titles. The players Kansas City receives make no material contributions to the Athletics' futile attempts to climb out of the second division.

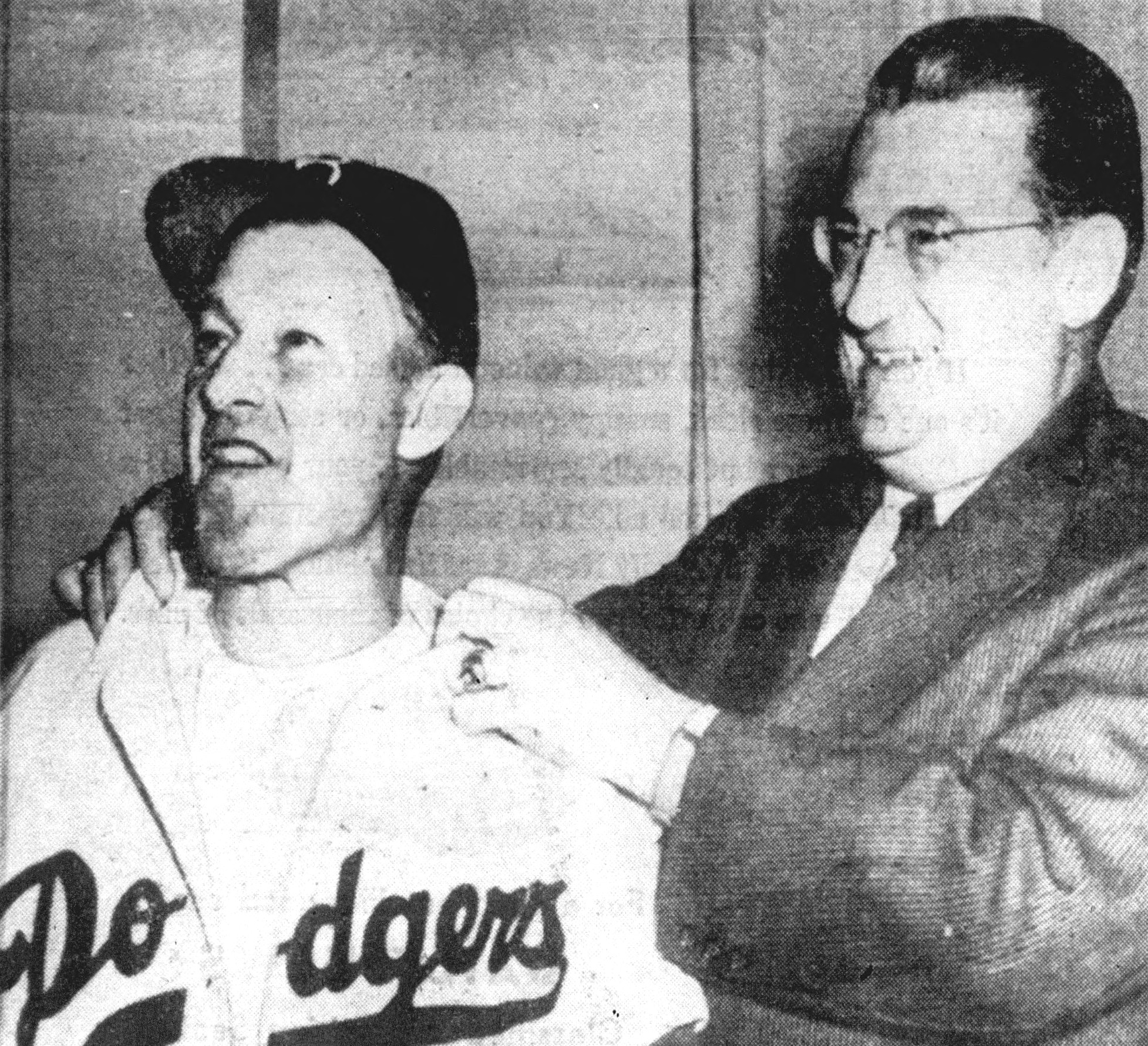
Walter O'Malley (right) with Chuck Dressen in November 1950

- February 21
  - Owners Walter O'Malley of the Brooklyn Dodgers and Philip K. Wrigley of the Chicago Cubs make an industry-changing "trade" of minor-league franchises. In the transaction, O'Malley acquires the Los Angeles Angels of the Pacific Coast League and the Angels' ballpark, Los Angeles' Wrigley Field, in exchange for the Dodgers' Fort Worth Cats farm club in the Texas League and $3 million. The swap enables O'Malley to lay claim to at least 50 percent of the booming Los Angeles market as a potential new home for his Dodgers. (The PCL's Hollywood Stars also have territorial rights.) The franchise swap not only paves the way for the Dodgers' groundbreaking move to California, but it pays more dividends when O'Malley trades ownership of the Angels' old minor-league facility to the city for land in Chavez Ravine, where he will eventually build Dodger Stadium.
  - The New York Giants, who are pioneering scouting young players in the Dominican Republic, sign 19-year-old amateur free agent and future record-setting pinch hitter Manny Mota.
- February 25 – In a 6–3 decision, the U.S. Supreme Court rules that professional football is subject to antitrust law—a year after a similar ruling concerning professional boxing. However, "Organized Baseball" remains exempt from antitrust statutes, based on the high court's 1922 decision in Federal Baseball Club v. National League.
- February 26
  - Bill Sarni, expected to be the Giants' starting catcher in 1957, is hospitalized after experiencing chest pain during spring training workouts in Phoenix. Diagnosed with a moderate heart attack, Sarni is forced to end his playing career at age 29; upon his recovery, he will serve as a New York coach in 1957 to protect his pension rights. Virgin Islander Valmy Thomas, a 31-year-old rookie, and light-hitting veteran Wes Westrum, 34, are the prime candidates to succeed to Sarni's role.
  - The Giants reacquire first baseman Whitey Lockman from the St. Louis Cardinals in exchange for knuckleballer Hoyt Wilhelm.
  - New Congressional hearings into Organized Baseball's exemption from U.S. antitrust laws are threatened by a California lawmaker who charges that a "horsehide cartel" may try to keep Major League Baseball out of his state.

=== March ===
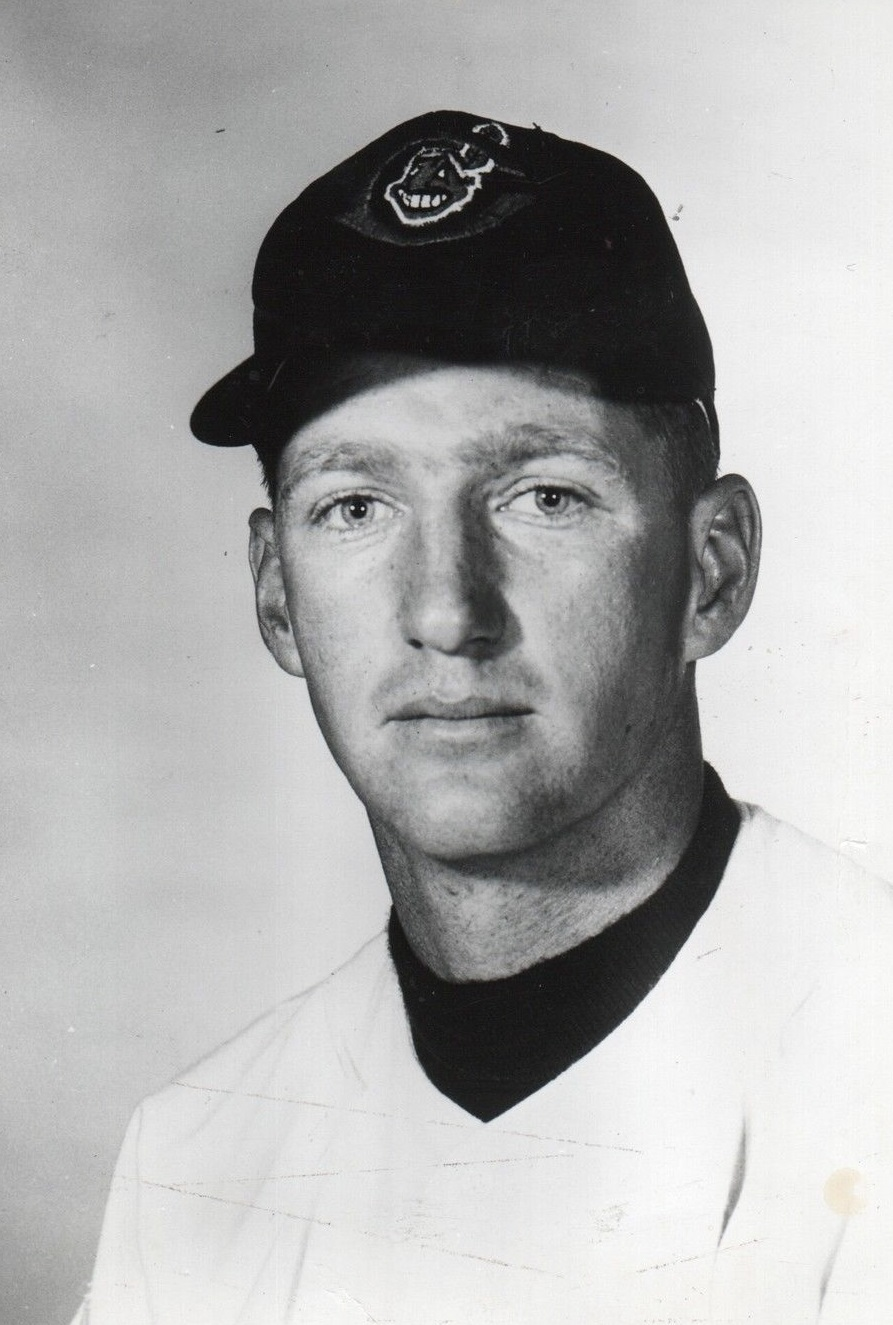
Herb Score

- March 10 – A newly elected member of the Washington Senators' board of directors, prominent D.C. tax attorney C. Leo DeOrsey, creates a brief firestorm among the baseball establishment when he tells a United Press reporter that baseball is not a hobby or a mere sport, but "a business, and a big business." He says antitrust laws should apply to "Organized Baseball" as in other U.S. professional sports, the perpetual reserve clause should be replaced, and the traditional structure of two, eight-team leagues should be realigned geographically. He is quickly rebuffed by multiple MLB officials, including Commissioner Ford Frick and the Senators' president and principal owner, Calvin Griffith.
- March 14 – The New York Yankees and Boston Red Sox make one of their infrequent trades in which the Yankees obtain right-hander Eli Grba and outfielder Gordie Windhorn from Boston for outfielder Bill Renna.
- March 18 – The Cleveland Indians say they've turned down a $1 million offer from wealthy Boston owner Tom Yawkey for the contract of their brilliant, 23-year-old left-hander, Herb Score, who has won 36 games and struck out 508 hitters in his first two seasons in a Cleveland uniform.
- March 21 – The St. Louis Cardinals trade colorful, legendary minor-league slugger Rocky Nelson to the Toronto Maple Leafs of the Triple-A International League to complete an earlier transaction that netted the Redbirds pitcher Frank Barnes. Nelson, 32, is known for "terrorizing" minor-league hurlers but is chronically incapable of holding down a big-league job. The sale to Toronto turns out in Nelson's favor, however, when he wins his third International League Most Valuable Player Award of the 1950s and second Triple Crown with the 1958 Leafs—and merits one more MLB chance, when he will win a roster spot with the 1959–1961 Pittsburgh Pirates and a 1960 World Series ring as a platoon first baseman.

=== April ===
- April 5 – The Philadelphia Phillies acquire slick-fielding shortstop Humberto "Chico" Fernández from the Brooklyn Dodgers for $75,000 and five players, including pitchers Ron Negray and Ben Flowers (PTBNL), first baseman Tim Harkness, and veteran outfielder/pinch hitter Elmer Valo. Fernández starts 145 games during 1957, becoming the Phils' first Latin American regular player.
- April 16 – On Opening Day of the National League season, the New York Giants reacquire catcher Ray Katt, along with third baseman Ray Jablonski, from the Chicago Cubs for journeyman southpaw Dick Littlefield and outfielder Bob Lennon. Katt will join the Giants' three-man catching corps.
- April 18 – New York City parks commissioner Robert Moses proposes a new 78-acre (320,000 m^{2}) tract in Flushing Meadows as a site for a new National League baseball stadium. The plan, submitted to mayor Robert F. Wagner Jr., includes a 50,000-seat stadium with a plastic dome to be built by the parks department. Shea Stadium—minus a dome—will eventually be erected on the site; it opens in 1964.
- April 20 – The St. Louis Cardinals atone for an ill-advised 1956 Frank Lane trade, sending weak-hitting outfielder Bobby Del Greco and left-handed pitcher Ed Mayer to the Chicago Cubs for outfielder Jim King. The Cards had obtained Del Greco from the Pittsburgh Pirates even up for outfielder Bill Virdon 11 months earlier, but he had batted only .215 in a St. Louis uniform.
- April 21 – In the first inning of a 3–1 loss to the Milwaukee Braves at Milwaukee County Stadium, the Cincinnati Redlegs are involved in a bizarre play. With Don Hoak on second and Gus Bell on first, Wally Post hits a ground ball to Milwaukee shortstop Johnny Logan. Hoak breaks up a potential double play by fielding the ball himself and flipping it to Logan. Hoak is called out for interference (contact with a batted ball before a fielder touched it), but Post is given a single on the play. The day before, Johnny Temple let Bell's ground ball hit him with the same result, with Temple called out for interference and Bell awarded a single. The two incidents prompt league presidents Warren Giles and Will Harridge to jointly announce a rule change that declares that both the runner and batter are out, and no runners are allowed to advance, if a runner intentionally interferes with a batted ball.
- April 22 – John Irvin Kennedy becomes the first black player in Philadelphia Phillies history, entering the game in the top of the eighth inning as a pinch runner for Solly Hemus. All eight NL teams have now integrated their playing rosters.
- April 24
  - The New York City Board of Estimate fails to act on Robert Moses' Flushing Meadows stadium plan as outlined by mayor Robert Wagner less than a week ago. It's reported that the board "needs more time" to study the plan.
  - In the fourth inning of a Chicago Cubs 9–5 loss to the Cincinnati Redlegs at Crosley Field, Cubs pitcher Moe Drabowsky claims to be hit on the foot by a Joe Nuxhall pitch. Afterwards, teammate Dick Drott borrows a wheelchair from a fan and wheels Drabowsky to first base, and immediately is ejected by home plate umpire Stan Landes. Drabowsky is eventually called out on strikes.
- April 26 – Former team owner Walter Briggs Jr. resigns as general manager of the Detroit Tigers after disagreements with the Tigers' new board of directors. He is replaced by John McHale, 35, the club's farm system director.
- April 27 – Latin American baseball mourns at the funeral for all-time great player and manager Lázaro Salazar in Mexico City. The roster of the Diablos Rojos del México, decked out in full uniform, act as pall bearers for their late manager, who died suddenly two days earlier at age 45 after being stricken in the club's dugout. (See Deaths entry for April 25.) Salazar will be honored by membership in the national baseball halls of fame in Mexico, Venezuela and his native Cuba. A commemorative plaque in Monterrey will call Salazar "the greatest manager there has ever been in Mexico. The first to conquer seven pennants in a row. An extraordinary pitcher, first baseman and outfielder."
- April 29 – The Washington Senators trade pitchers Bob Chakales and Dean Stone to the Boston Red Sox for pitcher Russ Kemmerer, shortstop Milt Bolling and outfielder Faye Throneberry.

=== May ===
- May 1
  - The Pittsburgh Pirates deal 1956 All-Star first baseman Dale Long and outfielder Lee Walls to the Chicago Cubs for first baseman Dee Fondy and second baseman Gene Baker. Long had set an MLB record in May 1956 by smashing home runs in eight consecutive games.
  - Wally Post's two-run single is decisive as the visiting Cincinnati Redlegs defeat the Philadelphia Phillies, 8–6, in 16 innings at Connie Mack Stadium.
- May 2 – In another 16-inning affair, this time at Ebbets Field, Don Blasingame's single plates the winning run and Larry Jackson fires four scoreless innings in relief, lifting the St. Louis Cardinals to a 3–2 victory over the Brooklyn Dodgers.
- May 7
  - Two batters into the game at Cleveland Stadium, Indians' pitcher Herb Score is hit in the face by a line drive by New York Yankee Gil McDougald, the ball breaking numerous bones and leaving him bloodied. McDougald vows to quit if Score is blinded as a result. Score regains his 20/20 vision, but will miss the remainder of the 1957 season. With Bob Lemon pitching the rest of the way, the Indians defeat the Yankees 2–1.
  - The 4–16 Washington Senators make the year's first managerial change, dismissing Chuck Dressen and replacing him with 1947 World Series hero Cookie Lavagetto.

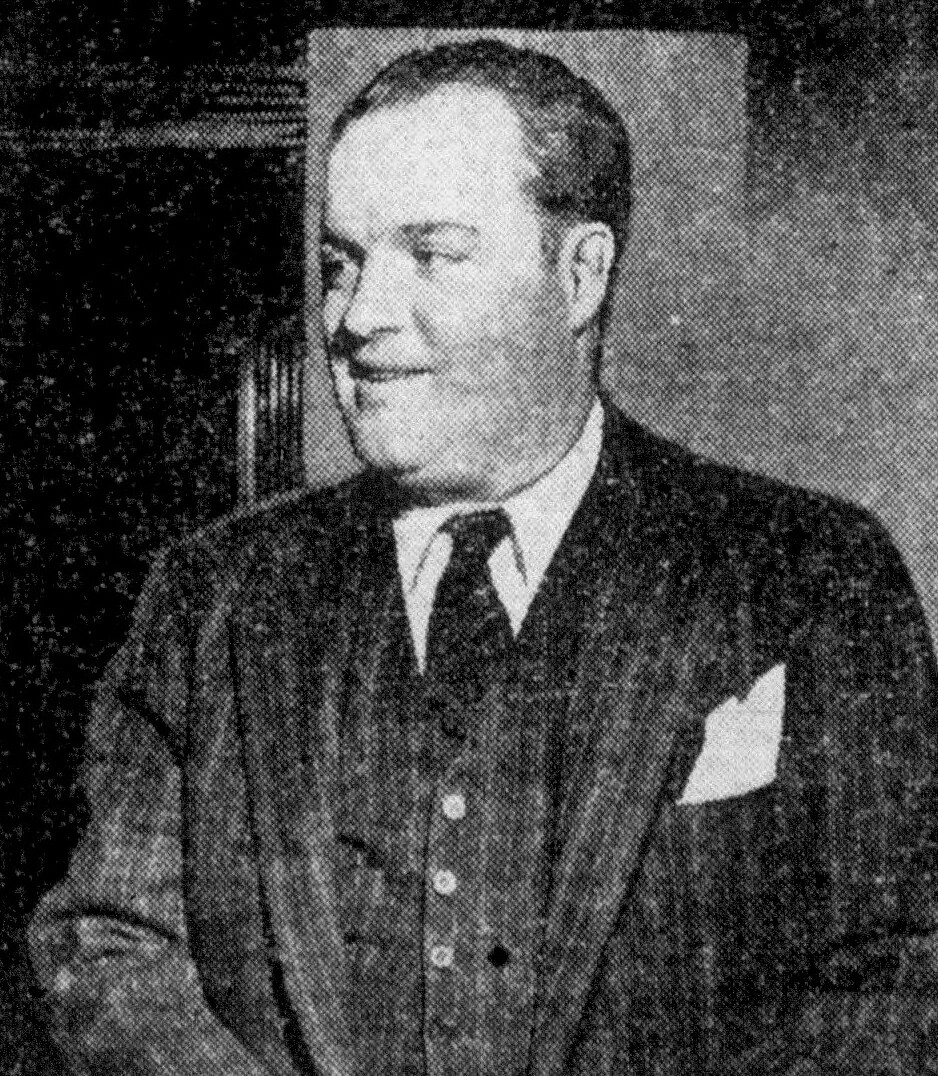
Horace Stoneham

- May 10 – Mayor George Christopher of San Francisco confers with Horace Stoneham on a possible shift of the New York Giants franchise to the West Coast.
- May 15 – The Cleveland Indians erupt for three runs in the top of the 16th inning to defeat the Baltimore Orioles, 11–8, at Memorial Stadium. Cal McLish, Cleveland's seventh pitcher of the day, gets the win.
- May 21
  - Hosting, and dropping, another 16-inning game, the Baltimore Orioles waste a 15-frame, one-run-allowed effort from starter Ray Moore, when the Detroit Tigers' Reno Bertoia knocks in Paul Foytack with the tie-breaking run off reliever Mike Fornieles, giving Detroit a 2–1 victory. Moore had furnished the Baltimore run with a third-inning homer, his second long ball in two games and third of 1957.
  - Citing it as a "Men Only" room, the Boston Red Sox deny Doris O'Donnell a seat in the press room. O'Donnell is a reporter covering the Cleveland Indians on their road trip to Boston.
- May 23 – The Chicago Cubs reacquire pitcher Don Elston from the Brooklyn Dodgers for pitchers Jackie Collum and Vito Valentinetti. Elston will become the Cubs' ace relief pitcher beginning in 1958 and an NL All-Star in 1959.
- May 28 – The National League approves the proposed moves of the Giants and Dodgers to the West Coast, provided both clubs make their request before October 1 and move at the same time.
- May 29 – New York City mayor Robert Wagner says he plans to speak with the Giants and Dodgers about the proposed moves, but warns that the city will not be "blackjacked" into anything.
- May 30 – Walter O'Malley rejects an offer from a Queens group to buy the Dodgers.

=== June ===
- June 1 – The slugging Cincinnati Redlegs, who tied an MLB record for team homers in a season in 1956, overwhelm the Chicago Cubs at Crosley Field, 22–2. Among Cincinnati's 22 hits are seven home runs, including two from future Hall-of-Famer Frank Robinson and one from winning pitcher Hal Jeffcoat, a former Cub and former outfielder.
- June 9 – Ernie Banks belts his 100th career home run, helping the Chicago Cubs beat the Philadelphia Phillies, 7–3.
- June 13
  - For the second time in 1957, Ted Williams slugs three home runs in a game, connecting today off fellow future Hall-of-Famers Early Wynn and Bob Lemon in the Boston Red Sox' 9–3 victory over the Indians at Cleveland Stadium. Early this year, on May 8, the 38-year-old slugger had belted three long balls at Chicago's Comiskey Park against the White Sox. While Williams will hit 521 career homers, he'll have only three three-home-run games; these two and one on July 14, 1946.
  - A donnybrook breaks out at Ebbets Field in the second inning. After the Milwaukee Braves' Bill Bruton hits his second home run of the day, Don Drysdale of the Brooklyn Dodgers plunks Johnny Logan. The enraged Braves shortstop charges the mound, but it's the on-deck hitter, Eddie Mathews, who catches up to Drysdale and punches him in the ensuing melee. Logan and Drysdale are ejected, Mathews stays in the game, and the Braves win 8–5.
  - The American League has a beanball-induced brawl of its own. In the second inning at Comiskey Park, the Chicago White Sox' Larry Doby takes exception when a wild pitch from the New York Yankees' Art Ditmar sails over his head. The benches clear and a 28-minute melee ensues; the White Sox' Doby and Walt Dropo are ejected for fighting, along with the Yankees' Billy Martin and Enos Slaughter. Ditmar stays in the game and goes eight innings, gaining credit for the Bombers' 4–3 win. Martin's ejection comes in his penultimate appearance as a player in a Yankee uniform; he'll be traded away two days later.
  - The Baltimore Orioles trade third baseman/outfielder Dick Williams to the Cleveland Indians for outfielder Jim Busby.
- June 14
  - The Detroit Tigers deal first baseman Earl Torgeson to the Chicago White Sox for outfielder Dave Philley.
  - The Boston Red Sox trade infielder and 1950 batting champion Billy Goodman to the Baltimore Orioles for relief pitcher Mike Fornieles.
- June 15
  - The Milwaukee Braves add the final missing piece to their lineup, acquiring future Baseball Hall of Fame second baseman Red Schoendienst from the New York Giants for three players: pitcher Ray Crone, second baseman Danny O'Connell and outfielder Bobby Thomson, the erstwhile (1951) Giant hero. Schoendienst, 34, bats .310 in 93 games as a Brave, and helps them win the 1957 World Series. He also contributes to their 1958 NL pennant.
  - A month after the highly publicized "Copacabana incident" at the Manhattan nightclub, the New York Yankees trade second baseman Billy Martin, along with pitcher Ralph Terry, infielder Woodie Held and outfielder Bob Martyn, to the Kansas City Athletics in exchange for pitcher Ryne Duren and outfielders Harry Simpson and Jim Pisoni. Press coverage has implicated Martin and Yankee stars Mickey Mantle, Whitey Ford, Yogi Berra and Hank Bauer in a May 15 brawl involving other customers at the club, but only Martin will be punished via the trade to the lowly Athletics. The banishment will cause Martin to hold a grudge against his former mentor and father figure, Casey Stengel.
- June 17 – The Washington Senators sign teenaged amateur free agent Jim Kaat, a freshman at Hope College of Holland, Michigan. The left-hander will win 283 games and 16 Gold Glove Awards over 25 MLB seasons and a 2022 berth in the Baseball Hall of Fame.

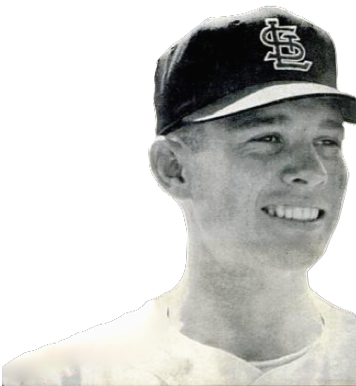
Von McDaniel

- June 21 – At Busch Stadium, St. Louis Cardinals rookie phenom Von McDaniel—making his first MLB start—allows only two hits and throws a complete game, 2–0 shutout against the defending league champion Brooklyn Dodgers. Von, 18, is the younger brother of the Cardinals' Lindy McDaniel. Today's game is his third big-league appearance since he signed as a bonus baby out of an Oklahoma high school in May. His season so far: three games pitched, a 2–0 won–lost mark, 17 innings pitched, four hits and no runs (earned or unearned) allowed, three bases on balls and 13 strikeouts.
- June 26 – The Baltimore Orioles sign 18-year-old amateur free agent pitcher Milt Pappas, a recent graduate of Cooley High School, Detroit.
- June 28 – Veteran right-hander Ray Moore throws the Orioles' fourth straight shutout, blanking the Cleveland Indians on three hits, 6–0, at Memorial Stadium. His "CG SO" follows similar efforts from Hal Brown, Billy Loes and Connie Johnson. The Baltimore staff's scoreless streak will reach 46 innings—longest in MLB in 1957—until it's broken with two out in the fifth inning the following day, also against Cleveland.

=== July ===
- July 2 – Left-fielder Lee Walls hits for the cycle and drives in four runs, but his Chicago Cubs drop an 8–6 decision to the Cincinnati Redlegs at Wrigley Field.
- July 4 – At the season's unofficial half-way point, there's a five-team race in the National League: Cincinnati (44–32) holds the lead, but St. Louis, Milwaukee, Brooklyn and Philadelphia are all within three games from first place. In the American League, the New York Yankees (48–26) boast a three-game edge over the Chicago White Sox. The Bombers went 21–9 during the month of June.
- July 6
  - Seeking a right-handed hitting first baseman to temporarily replace the sidelined Joe Adcock, the Milwaukee Braves purchase the contract of Vernal "Nippy" Jones from Sacramento of the Pacific Coast League. Former big-leaguer Jones, 32, who's been playing in the high minors since May 1952, will stick with the Braves all season and "make his mark" during a pinch-hitting appearance in Game 4 of the 1957 World Series exactly three months from today.
  - Claude Osteen makes his major league debut. He appears in mop up duty, going only two-thirds of an inning in relief for the Cincinnati Redlegs in a 17–3 loss to the St. Louis Cardinals.

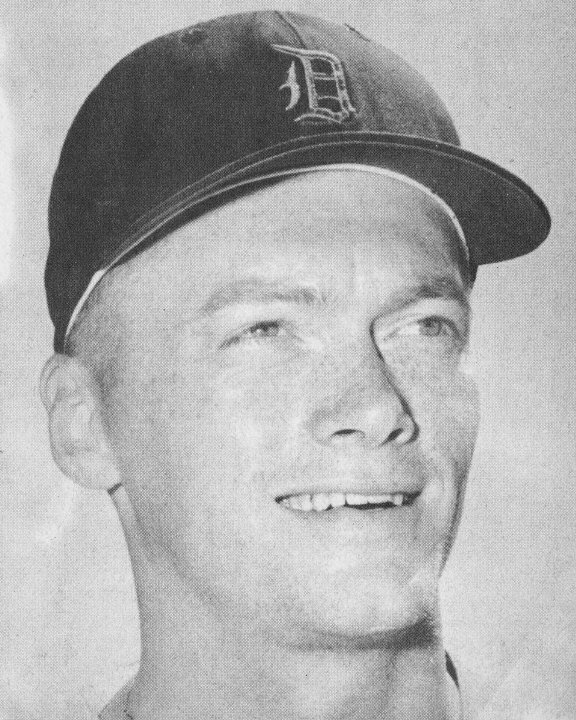
Jim Bunning

- July 9 – At Busch Stadium (formerly Sportsman's Park), home of the St. Louis Cardinals, the American League defeats the National League, 6–5, in the All-Star Game. Jim Bunning of the Detroit Tigers—the future Hall of Famer and United States Senator—goes three perfect innings to gain the win.
  - The run-up to the game is marked by the ballot stuffing campaign by fans of the Cincinnati Redlegs, which results in the election of seven Cincinnati regulars — catcher Ed Bailey, second baseman Johnny Temple, third baseman Don Hoak, shortstop Roy McMillan, and the entire starting outfield of Frank Robinson (left), Gus Bell (center) and Wally Post (right) — to the NL's starting lineup. The only exception, first baseman George Crowe, is beaten out by St. Louis icon Stan Musial. After an investigation, Commissioner Ford Frick replaces Bell and Post with Willie Mays (center field) and Hank Aaron (right field); Bell remains on the NL team as a reserve, while an injury keeps Post on the sidelines.
- July 11 – The season's unofficial second half begins with another brushback pitch and another bench-clearing brawl. Today, in the seventh at Ebbets Field, Raúl Sánchez of the Redlegs knocks down Jim Gilliam of the Dodgers and the full-scale melee commences. When the dust clears, umpire Jocko Conlan tosses Gilliam and Sánchez, plus Brooklyn's Charlie Neal and Cincinnati's Don Hoak. Two batters later, Duke Snider slugs a two-run homer off the Redlegs reliever Tom Acker, the difference-maker in a 5–4 Dodger victory.
- July 18 – New York Giants owner Horace Stoneham says his team will quit New York City after the season, adding that he's not heard anything more from San Francisco and that his move is not contingent on the Dodgers' fate. He sees a new stadium or joint occupancy of Yankee Stadium as the only reason for the Giants to stay in New York.
- July 20 – Before 6,758 fans at Ebbets Field, the Brooklyn Dodgers defeat the Chicago Cubs, 7–5. Duke Snider belts his 300th career home run; it's his 24th long ball of the season, and his eighth in ten games since the All-Star break.
- July 23 – New York Yankees superstar Mickey Mantle hits for the cycle in a 10–6 triumph over the visiting Chicago White Sox; it will be the only "cycle" of Mantle's 18-season career. His home run, a 465 ft (142 m) blast off Bob Keegan, almost "leaves Yankee Stadium" according to a newspaper headline.
- July 26 – Only three days after his big day against the White Sox, Mickey Mantle hits his 200th career home run. A solo shot, it comes at Yankee Stadium in the ninth inning of a loss to the Detroit Tigers' Jim Bunning, like Mantle a future Hall of Famer.
- July 28 – In his seventh MLB start, teenager Von McDaniel of the St. Louis Cardinals again makes headlines when he throws a one-hit, 4–0 shutout against the visiting Pittsburgh Pirates, improving his record to 5–2 and lowering his earned run average to 2.67. A second-inning double by Gene Baker ultimately deprives McDaniel of both a no-hitter and perfect game. The 18-year-old Oklahoman will post a 7–5 (3.22 ERA) record for this season, but in 1958 he will experience severe control problems that will end his pitching career.

=== August ===
- August 1 – Gil Hodges belts his 13th career grand slam to establish a new National League record. It also proves to be the last grand slam in the history of the Brooklyn Dodgers.
- August 2 – Having just lost the sixth of what will be an eight-game losing streak, the Pittsburgh Pirates (36–67 and seventh in the NL) replace manager Bobby Bragan with coach Danny Murtaugh, 39, a former Pirate second baseman. The Bucs will go 26–25 under Murtaugh, and he'll manage them for the next seven full seasons, leading them to the 1960 World Series title.
- August 3 – Lou Boudreau is fired as manager of the Kansas City Athletics, losers of 11 of their last 13 games and eighth in the American League. Coach Harry Craft takes the reins.
- August 19 – With Horace Stoneham citing poor attendance and San Francisco promising to build a new stadium in the Bayview area, the New York Giants' board of directors votes 8–1 to move to California in 1958. The only dissenting vote is by M. Donald Grant, who would go on to be one of the founders of the New York Mets.
- August 20 – Bob Keegan of the Chicago White Sox no-hits the Washington Senators 6–0 in the second game of a doubleheader at Comiskey Park. The no-hitter is the first by a White Sox pitcher since Bill Dietrich in 1937.
- August 23 – Ambidextrous Ángel Maciás, pitching exclusively right-handed, hurls a perfect game in the championship match of the 1957 Little League World Series at Williamsport, enabling Monterrey, Mexico, to become the first team from outside the U.S. to win the LLWS. The Monterrey squad, comprising boys from the factory town, will be fêted by the presidents of both Mexico and the United States.

=== September ===
- September 1 – The New York Yankees are awarded pitcher Sal Maglie, 40, via a waiver claim from the Brooklyn Dodgers.
- September 2 – In the first game of a doubleheader at Wrigley Field, Frank Torre of the Milwaukee Braves ties a National League record by scoring six runs in the Braves' 23–10 victory over the Chicago Cubs. The Braves' 26 hits are the most by a team in one game in 1957.
- September 5 & 6 – In consecutive days, pitchers hit walk-off home runs—the only time this occurs in MLB history. On September 5 in The Bronx, Bob Grim slugs a three-run homer with two out in the ninth, enabling the New York Yankees to beat the Boston Red Sox, 5–2; then, the next night, Chicago White Sox reliever Dixie Howell follows suit, hitting a solo blast against the Kansas City Athletics with one out in the ninth for a 4–3 victory at Comiskey Park.
- September 8 – The Brooklyn Dodgers and New York Giants battle one last time before each team heads to California. The Giants defeat the Dodgers 3–2 at the Polo Grounds, behind starter Curt Barclay and closer Marv Grissom. Hank Sauer has the key hit, a two-run homer off losing hurler Don Drysdale.
- September 14 – Ernie Banks hits three home runs, helping Chicago Cubs beat the visiting Pittsburgh Pirates, 7–3. It's the second time in Banks' career he's hit three homers in a game.
- September 21 – The Baltimore Orioles purchase the contract of future Hall-of-Famer Hoyt Wilhelm from the St. Louis Cardinals. Knuckle-baller Wilhelm, 35, has 15 years, a no-hitter, and seven All-Star team selections remaining in his 21-season MLB career.
- September 23 – In their fifth season since leaving Boston, the Milwaukee Braves clinch the National League pennant at County Stadium after Braves slugger (and eventual 1957 NL MVP) Hank Aaron clubs a two-run walk-off home run off Billy Muffett in the bottom of the 11th inning to give Milwaukee a 4–2 victory over the St. Louis Cardinals. The clincher is witnessed by 40,926 fans during a season in which the Braves draw 2.21 million fans, most-ever in the 82-year-long history of the Senior Circuit.
- September 24 – In the last game at Brooklyn's Ebbets Field, 6,702 fans watch Dodgers' lefty Danny McDevitt prevail over the Pittsburgh Pirates, 2–0. Gil Hodges has Brooklyn's last RBI.
- September 29
  - With 1895 New York Giants manager Jack Doyle, now age 87, among the 11,606 looking on, the Giants lose their final game at the Polo Grounds, 9–1 to the Pittsburgh Pirates. Pirates pitcher Bob Friend defeats Johnny Antonelli in the historic contest, and fans storm the field for souvenirs as soon as Dusty Rhodes grounds to Pittsburgh shortstop Dick Groat for the final out.
  - Ted Williams goes two for two against the New York Yankees at Fenway Park, raising his batting average to .388 before leaving for a pinch runner. Williams, 39 years old and the last man to bat over .400 (.406 in 1941), captures his fifth AL batting championship and first since 1948. Sidelined for two weeks and 14 games by pneumonia in September, he manages to end the season with 38 home runs, second in the Junior Circuit, four fewer than the Washington Senators' Roy Sievers.
  - The Cleveland Indians fire Kerby Farrell after his rookie season as their manager, which sees Cleveland (76–77, sixth in the American League) fall under .500 for the first time since 1946. Bobby Bragan, fired by the Pittsburgh Pirates in August, is named Farrell's successor.

=== October ===
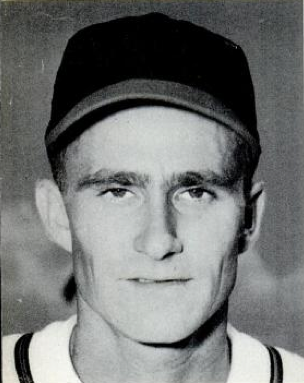
1957 World Series MVP Lew Burdette of the Braves

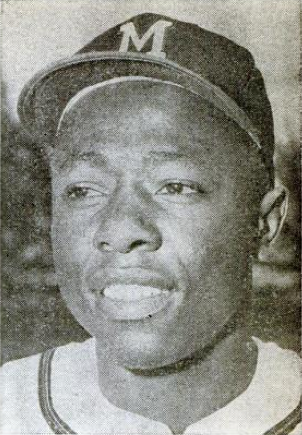
1957 NL MVP Hank Aaron of the Braves

- October 6 – The New York Yankees are poised to take a three-games-to-one lead over the Milwaukee Braves in the 1957 World Series, ahead 5–4 in the tenth inning of Game 4 at County Stadium, when the Braves send up Nippy Jones to pinch-hit for Warren Spahn leading off the home half of the frame. A low, inside pitch from Tommy Byrne skids past Yankee catcher Yogi Berra and rolls to the backstop, seemingly Ball 1. However, Jones protests to umpire Augie Donatelli that he was hit on the foot by Byrne's offering and should be awarded first base. The polish from Jones' right shoe on the retrieved baseball proves his argument. Jones takes his base, and the "shoe polish incident" opens the floodgates. The Braves go on to score three runs, win 7–5 on Eddie Mathews' home run, and tie the Fall Classic at two games each. The incident is cited as the turning point when Milwaukee goes on to win the world championship in seven games. The Game 4 plate appearance is Jones' last as a big-leaguer.
- October 7 – The Los Angeles City Council approves the Chavez Ravine site for Dodger Stadium by a vote of ten to four.
- October 8 – Brooklyn Dodgers owner Walter O'Malley announces that the Dodgers will be moving to Los Angeles for the 1958 season. New York would not have a National League team again until the expansion New York Mets began play in 1962.
- October 10 – The Milwaukee Braves defeat the New York Yankees, 5–0, in Game 7 of the World Series to capture the franchise's second World Series, and the only Fall Classic it will win during its 13-year tenure in Milwaukee. This is the Braves' first title since the "Miracle" Boston Braves of 1914. They also become the first team to win a championship after relocating. Braves pitcher Lew Burdette, today's victor, is named MVP with three complete game victories, including two shutouts. He is the first pitcher to hurl two "calciminings" in a Series since Christy Mathewson in 1905.
- October 15 – A final potential roadblock to the New York Giants' relocation falls by the wayside, when the Giants and Boston Red Sox swap ownership of owned-and-operated minor-league franchises. When Boston exchanges its San Francisco Seals of the Pacific Coast League for the Giants' Minneapolis Millers of the American Association, Horace Stoneham gains territorial rights to San Francisco.
- October 16 – Hank Greenberg, general manager of the Cleveland Indians for eight seasons, is notified by the Tribe's board of directors that his contract will not be renewed. The Hall of Fame slugger will remain a minority owner of the franchise through 1958.

=== November ===
- November 7 – Philadelphia Phillies right-hander Jack Sanford, who won 19 games (losing eight), led his league in strikeouts (188), and posted an earned run average of 3.08, wins 1957's National League Rookie of the Year Award.
- November 12 – "Trader" Frank Lane resigns as general manager of the St. Louis Cardinals and is replaced by Bing Devine. Lane, 62, is then hired to succeed Hank Greenberg as GM of the Cleveland Indians, where he will enhance his reputation as a compulsive wheeler-dealer through the end of the 1960 season.
- November 14 – The Milwaukee Braves' Hank Aaron, 23, who led the National League in runs scored, homers, RBI, and total bases, wins what will be the only NL MVP Award of a 23-year career. Batting champion Stan Musial of the St. Louis Cardinals, 36, finishes second in BBWAA balloting.
- November 20
  - After playing 73 games for the Kansas City Athletics since being acquired from the New York Yankees on June 15, second baseman Billy Martin is traded for the second time in five months as part of a 13-player deal between his Athletics and the Detroit Tigers. In the transaction, Kansas City sends Martin, pitchers Mickey McDermott and Tom Morgan, catcher Tim Thompson, and outfielders Lou Skizas and Gus Zernial to Detroit for pitchers Duke Maas and John Tsitouris, catcher Frank House, first basemen Kent Hadley and Jim McManus ("PTBNL"), and outfielders Jim Small and Bill Tuttle.
  - Shigeo Nagashima, a slugger star at Rikkyo University, signs with the Yomiuri Giants for a record bonus of $69,000.
- November 22:
  - Mickey Mantle barely edges Ted Williams, 233 to 209 votes, to win the American League MVP Award. Mantle batted .365 with 34 home runs for the first-place New York Yankees, while Williams, of the third-place Boston Red Sox, led the AL with a .388 average and a stunning .731 slugging percentage. Red Sox owner Tom Yawkey fumes at the news, noting that two Chicago writers listed the 39-year-old Williams in the ninth and tenth places on their ballots.
  - After 22 seasons of work, National League umpire Larry Goetz is unwillingly "retired" by league president Warren Giles. The discharged arbitrator had been critical of the Senior Circuit because of its refusal to include umpires in the players' pension fund.
- November 26 – Yoshio Tanaka, an American citizen of Japanese descent, is named manager of the Hanshin Tigers, becoming the first American to manage a NPB club.
- November 28 – Milwaukee Braves pitcher Warren Spahn, who posted a 21–11 record with 111 strikeouts and a 3.49 ERA, wins the 1957 MLB Cy Young Award almost unanimously. His only competition for the title is Dick Donovan of the Chicago White Sox (16–6, 88, 3.35), who receives one vote. Only one pitcher is selected each season for this prestigious pitching award until 1967, when each league will name a winner.
- November 29 – New York City mayor Robert F. Wagner Jr. forms a four-member committee to seek the relocation of existing National League teams to replace the departed Dodgers and Giants. The Cincinnati Redlegs, Philadelphia Phillies, and Pittsburgh Pirates all reject the city's overtures.

=== December ===
- December 2 – Three Pacific Coast League franchises are forced to relocate when the Brooklyn Dodgers confirm their long-rumored move to Los Angeles for the 1958 season and the New York Giants announce their move to San Francisco. The Hollywood Stars move from Los Angeles to Salt Lake City, the Los Angeles Angels transfer to Spokane, Washington, and the San Francisco Seals move to Phoenix, Arizona.
- December 3 – The Chicago White Sox deal future Hall-of-Famer Larry Doby, 33, to the Baltimore Orioles, along with pitchers Jack Harshman and Russ Heman and first baseman Jim Marshall, for pitcher Ray Moore, infielder Billy Goodman and outfielder Tito Francona.
- December 4 – In another seismic trade, the White Sox trade outfielder Minnie Miñoso, a future Hall-of-Famer and fan favorite, to the Cleveland Indians, along with journeyman infielder Fred Hatfield, for another Cooperstown-bound player, pitcher Early Wynn, and outfielder Al Smith.
- December 5
  - The Cincinnati Redlegs trade 19-year-old prospect Curt Flood and fellow outfielder Joe Taylor to the St. Louis Cardinals for pitchers Marty Kutyna, Willard Schmidt and Ted Wieand. Centerfielder Flood will become a three-time National League All-Star, a seven-time Gold Glove Award winner, and two-time World Series champion with St. Louis—then go on to roil the baseball establishment with his legal challenge of the reserve clause.
  - The Milwaukee Braves deal southpaw Taylor Phillips and catcher Sammy Taylor to the Chicago Cubs for pitchers Don Kaiser and Bob Rush and outfielder Eddie Haas. Veteran right-hander Rush is a two-time former NL All-Star.
- December 7 – The Associated Press and the BBWAA overwhelmingly vote the New York Yankees' versatile Tony Kubek as the American League's 1957 Rookie of the Year. Though he will become known primarily as a shortstop, Kubek has spent his rookie campaign playing outfield (50 games) and third base (38 games) as well as 41 games at short. Boston Red Sox third baseman Frank Malzone, the only other "ROTY" candidate, receives one vote.
- December 9
  - The Pittsburgh Pirates deal pitcher Bob Purkey to the Cincinnati Redlegs for southpaw Don Gross. Purkey will help Cincinnati win the 1961 NL pennant, then go 23–5 the following year.
  - The New York Yankees unconditionally release infielder and five-time World Series champion Jerry Coleman after nine seasons with the Bombers. Coleman, a 33-year-old United States Marine Corps combat veteran of both World War II and the Korean War, will serve three seasons in the Yankees' front office before beginning a long baseball broadcasting career that culminates with a Ford C. Frick Award.
- December 16 – The Cincinnati Redlegs keep dealing, acquiring left-handed starter Harvey Haddix from the Philadelphia Phillies for outfielder Wally Post.
- December 17 – The Boston Red Sox release second baseman Gene Mauch and name him manager of their new Triple-A farm club, the Minneapolis Millers. Mauch, 32, will enjoy two successful seasons in Minneapolis before beginning his MLB managing career in April 1960 with the Philadelphia Phillies.
- December 28 – After a Christmas hiatus, the Redlegs make their final major trade of 1957 by sending 11-year team veteran and slugger Ted Kluszewski to the Pittsburgh Pirates for another 33-year-old first baseman, Dee Fondy. Injured for much of 1957, "Big Klu" is still a popular, four-time All-Star and author of 251 homers in a Cincinnati uniform.
- December 30 – The only Louisiana-based team in the Texas League, the Shreveport Sports, withdraws from the Double-A circuit. The Sports have remained all-White since the league integrated in 1952, and a 1956 state law banning interracial athletic events in Louisiana has forced the seven other Texas League clubs to leave their Black players home while visiting Shreveport during 1957. The Sports will be inactive in 1958, then join the segregated Southern Association in 1959.

== Movies ==
- Fear Strikes Out

== Births ==
=== January ===
- January 5 – Bob Dernier
- January 13 – Mike Madden
- January 14 – Tony Brizzolara
- January 16
  - Steve Balboni
  - Marty Castillo
- January 19 – Brad Mills
- January 22 – Brian Dayett
- January 23 – Alfonso Pulido
- January 25 – John Flannery

=== February ===
- February 1 – Tom Wieghaus
- February 2 – Craig Chamberlain
- February 3
  - Larry Poncino
  - Don Welchel
- February 4 – Randy Gomez
- February 7
  - Dámaso García
  - Carney Lansford
- February 9 – Pat Underwood
- February 10 – Jeff Cornell
- February 12 – Steve Brown
- February 14 – Jaime Cocanower
- February 19 – Dave Stewart
- February 20 – Jesús Figueroa
- February 23 – Jim Anderson

=== March ===
- March 1 – Johnny Ray
- March 3 – Skeeter Barnes
- March 5 – Jerry Ujdur
- March 8
  - John Butcher
  - Bob Stoddard
- March 12 – Mike Quade
- March 13 – Duane Walker
- March 14
  - Steve Lake
  - Ty Waller
- March 15 – Freddie Martinez
- March 18
  - Rickey Keeton
  - Al Olmsted
- March 21 – Luis Leal
- March 27 – Dave Van Gorder

=== April ===
- April 1 – Manny Castillo
- April 7 – Rick Engle
- April 17 – Dave Huppert
- April 21 – Jesse Orosco
- April 22 – Dave Schmidt
- April 23 – Darryl Cias
- April 27 – Willie Upshaw

=== May ===
- May 1 – Allan Ramirez
- May 4 – Rick Leach
- May 6 – Kim Seaman
- May 9
  - Steve Hammond
  - John Stuper
- May 12 – Lou Whitaker
- May 14 – Fran Mullins
- May 16 – Mark Funderburk
- May 17 – Pascual Pérez
- May 19 – Ben Callahan
- May 28
  - Kirk Gibson
  - Tom Grant

=== June ===
- June 4 – Tony Peña
- June 6
  - Steve Fireovid
  - Max Venable
- June 7 – Marty Decker
- June 8 – Don Robinson
- June 14
  - Greg Brock
  - Tony Castillo
- June 15 – Brett Butler
- June 16 – Salomé Barojas
- June 19 – Bob Gibson
- June 21 – Jay Pettibone
- June 24 – Doug Jones
- June 26
  - Jose Barrios
  - Mike Griffin
- June 29 – Eddie Miller
- June 30 – Bud Black

=== July ===
- July 3 – Danny Heep
- July 6 – Rich Murray
- July 7 – Dan Gladden
- July 12 – Manabu Kitabeppu
- July 13 – Chris Jones
- July 18 – Chris Smith
- July 19 – Curt Kaufman
- July 22 – Dave Stieb
- July 27 – Floyd Rayford
- July 30
  - Clint Hurdle
  - Steve Trout
- July 31
  - Howard Bailey
  - Leon Durham

=== August ===
- August 1 – Myron White
- August 4 – Ben Hayes
- August 6 – Bob Horner
- August 8 – Ray Fontenot
- August 9 – John Moses
- August 17 – Bill Landrum
- August 19
  - Scott Meyer
  - David Palmer
- August 20 – DeWayne Buice
- August 21
  - Steve Eddy
  - Frank Pastore
- August 23
  - Mike Boddicker
  - Tim Welke
- August 24 – Butch Benton
- August 26 – Alex Treviño
- August 30 – Dave Smith
- August 31 – Tom Candiotti

=== September ===
- September 1 – Dave Rucker
- September 4 – Kelly Heath
- September 10 – Len Whitehouse
- September 12 – Mario Ramírez
- September 14
  - Jerry Don Gleaton
  - Tim Wallach
- September 18 – Roger Mason
- September 23 – Tony Fossas
- September 25 – Glenn Hubbard
- September 26
  - Kelvin Moore
  - Doug Sisk
- September 29
  - Tim Flannery
  - Craig Lefferts
- September 30 – Ed Rapuano

=== October ===
- October 2 – Andre Robertson
- October 5 – Onix Concepción
- October 6 – Alfredo Griffin
- October 8
  - Mike Chris
  - Bob Skube
- October 17 – Kelly Paris
- October 18 – Mike Walters
- October 20 – Rick Ownbey
- October 22 – Jeff Jones
- October 23 – Dwight Lowry
- October 24
  - Ron Gardenhire
  - Bill Hayes
  - Ed Jurak
- October 26 – Harry Chappas
- October 29
  - Terry Felton
  - George Stablein
- October 30 – Houston Jiménez

=== November ===
- November 1 – José Moreno
- November 9 – Teddy Higuera
- November 10 – Jeff Twitty
- November 11 – Wil Culmer
- November 25 – Tony Brewer
- November 28 – Pat Rooney
- November 29 – Dennis Burtt

=== December ===
- December 4
  - Mike Couchee
  - Pat Sheridan
  - Lee Smith
- December 6 – Steve Bedrosian
- December 9
  - Steve Christmas
  - Ed Romero
- December 16 – Tom Gorman
- December 17
  - Mark Dempsey
  - Bob Ojeda
- December 20 – Bill Laskey
- December 21 – Tom Henke
- December 24 – Víctor Cruz

== Deaths ==
=== January ===
- January 6
  - Ed Abbaticchio, 79, middle infielder who played with four teams in three different leagues over nine seasons between 1897 and 1910, most prominently for the 1909 World Champion Pittsburgh Pirates.
  - Gil Gallagher, 60, shortstop for the 1922 Boston Braves.
- January 7 – Ches Crist, 74, backup catcher who played in 1906 for the Philadelphia Phillies.
- January 9 – Billy Gleason, 62, second baseman who played with the Pittsburgh Pirates from 1916 to 1917 and for the St. Louis Browns in 1921.
- January 12 – Victor Starffin, 40, Hall of Fame Japanese Baseball League pitcher.
- January 17
  - Carl Sawyer, 66, middle infielder and third baseman who played from 1915 to 1916 for the Washington Senators.
  - Tom Stanton, 82, catcher for the 1904 Chicago Cubs.
- January 19
  - Slim Branham, 56, pitcher whose career included hurling for seven teams in the Negro National League and Eastern Colored League between 1920 and 1927.
  - Larry Strands, 71, outfielder who played for the Newark Pepper of the outlaw Federal League in 1915, and later spent six seasons in the Minor Leagues from 1911 through 1916.
- January 22 – Petie Behan, 69, pitcher who spent time with the Guelph Maple Leafs of the Ontario-based Intercounty Baseball League in the early 1910s, before joining the Philadelphia Phillies from 1921 to 1923.
- January 31 – Chick Maynard, 60, shortstop for the 1922 Boston Red Sox.

=== February ===
- February 8 – Lee McElwee, 62, third baseman for the 1916 Philadelphia Athletics.
- February 16 – Cap Clark, 60, backup catcher for the Philadelphia Phillies in the 1938 season.
- February 19 – Red Munson, 73, catcher who played for the Philadelphia Phillies in 1905.
- February 20 – Dixie Leverett, 62, pitcher whose major league career spanned five season from 1922 to 1929 for the Chicago White Sox and Boston Braves.
- February 22 – Jim Begley, 54, second baseman who made two game appearances for the Cincinnati Reds in the 1924 season.
- February 24 – Bugs Reisigl, 69, pitcher for the 1911 Cleveland Naps.

=== March ===
- March 2 – Frank Hafner, 89, 19th century pitched who played two games for the 1888 Kansas City Cowboys of the American Association.
- March 10 – Erskine Mayer, 67, left-handed pitcher for the 1912–1918 Philadelphia Phillies, 1918–1919 Pittsburgh Pirates and 1919 Chicago White Sox, who posted a 91–70 record and 2.96 ERA in 245 games, while collecting back-to-back 21-wins seasons for Philadelphia in 1914 and 1915; appeared in 1915 and 1919 Word Series.
- March 12 – Dick Niehaus, 64, pitcher who played from 1913 through 1915 with the St. Louis Cardinals and for the Cleveland Indians in 1920.
- March 20 – Ezra Midkiff, third baseman for the Cincinnati Reds in 1909 and New York Highlanders/Yankees from 1912 to 1913.
- March 22 – Charlie Babington, 61, backup outfielder for the New York Giants in the 1915 season.
- March 31 – Billy Meyer, 64, catcher and manager who played with the Chicago White Sox in 1913 and Philadelphia Athletics from 1916 to 1917; longtime, successful minor-league manager who helmed the Pittsburgh Pirates over five seasons from 1948 to 1952; his uniform #1 was retired by the Pirates in 1954.

=== April ===
- April 5 – Art Bader, 70, backup outfielder for the 1904 St. Louis Browns.
- April 7 – Jim Scott, nicknamed "Death Valley Jim", 68, two-time 20-game-winner for the Chicago White Sox who compiled 107 victories with a 2.30 earned run average in nine seasons from 1909 to 1917; member of the 1917 World Series champions who remains one of the leading pitchers in White Sox annals, with his career ERA ranking 19th all-time in MLB history as of 2019; spent 25 years in majors and minors as a pitcher and umpire.
- April 15
  - Jack Coombs, 74, key member of the Philadelphia Athletics pitching staff, along with Chief Bender and Eddie Plank, on the 1910–1911 World Series champions; posted a 31–6 record with 13 shutouts and 1.30 ERA in 1910, then defeated the Chicago Cubs three times in the 1910 World Series; in 1911, he went 28–12, then won two games (losing none) against the New York Giants in the 1911 World Series; in his rookie season, he hurled a 24-inning, 4–1 complete game victory over the Boston Americans on September 1, 1906; also hurled for the 1916 National League champion Brooklyn Robins and won his only decision, to raise his Fall Classic record to 5–0 (2.70) in six games; his 13 shutouts still stand as a single season record in American League; managed Philadelphia Phillies for first 63 games of the 1919 season.
  - Ernie Padgett, 58, third baseman and middle infielder for the Boston Braves and Cleveland Indians in parts of five seasons spanning 1923–1927, who is best known for turning the fourth unassisted triple play in Major League Baseball history on October 6, 1923.
  - Rube Schauer, 66, Russian pitcher who played for the New York Giants and Philadelphia Athletics over five seasons from 1913 through 1917.
  - George Watkins, 30, third baseman for the 1946 Philadelphia Stars of the Negro National League.
- April 18
  - Zearlee Maxwell, 54, third baseman for the 1937–1938 Memphis Red Sox of the Negro American League.
  - Wally Reinecker, 66, third baseman who played for the Baltimore Terrapins of the outlaw Federal League in 1915.
  - Bill Sweeney, 52, first baseman for the Detroit Tigers in 1928 and Boston Red Sox from 1930 to 1931, and coach for the Tigers in 1946–1947; managed for 19 seasons in the Pacific Coast League, winning pennants with the Portland Beavers in 1936 and the Los Angeles Angels in 1943 and 1944; incumbent manager of the Beavers at the time of his death; member, PCL Hall of Fame.
- April 22 – Joe Benz, 71, spitball and knuckleball specialist who pitched from 1911 through 1919 for the Chicago White Sox and was a member of two American League champion teams in 1917 and 1919; threw a no-hitter against the Cleveland Naps in 1914.
- April 25 – Lázaro Salazar, 45, Cuban outfielder, first baseman, southpaw pitcher, and manager; played in the Negro National League (Cuban Stars West, New York Cubans) and Eastern Colored League (Pollock's Cuban Stars) between 1930 and 1936; known especially as a legendary figure in Cuban Winter League, Venezuelan Winter League, and Mexican League baseball; member of the Baseball Halls of Fame of all three nations; manager of defending champion Mexico City Reds when he was stricken by a fatal cerebral hemorrhage in his team's dugout during a game; won four batting titles in three countries and, as a pitcher, over 150 games, and managed his teams to 14 titles in four countries.

=== May ===
- May 6 – Ralph Judd, 55, pitcher who played with the Washington Senators in 1927 and for the New York Giants from 1929 to 1930.
- May 12 – Fred Bennett, 55, right fielder who played with the St. Louis Browns in 1928 and for the Pittsburgh Pirates in 1931.
- May 17 – Dummy Deegan, 82, deaf-mute pitcher who posted a 0–1 record and 6.35 ERA in two appearances for the 1901 New York Giants.
- May 20 – Roy Hutson, 55, fourth outfielder for the Brooklyn Robins in 1925.

=== June ===
- June 1 – Pete Schneider, 61, hard-throwing pitcher who played for the Cincinnati Reds from 1914 to 1918 and the New York Yankees in 1919, whose best season was in 1917, when he won 20 games and finished sixth in the National League with a 2.10 ERA.
- June 4 – Paul Krichell, 74, French catcher for the St. Louis Browns in parts of two season from 1911 to 1912, who later became head scout for the New York Yankees for 37 years, signing over 200 players, including future Baseball Hall of Famers Lou Gehrig, Phil Rizzuto, Whitey Ford and Tony Lazzeri.
- June 5 – Pete Wilson, 71, pitcher for the New York Highlanders from 1908 to 1909.
- June 10
  - George Rohe, 82, reserve infielder for the Baltimore Orioles and Chicago White Sox over parts of four seasons spanning 1901–1907, who unexpectedly became a postseason hero after going 7-for-27 with two triples, a double and four RBI, helping the Hitless Wonders White Sox defeat the highly favored Chicago Cubs in six games of the 1906 World Series for one of the greatest upsets in Series history.
  - John Slappey, 58, pitcher for the 1920 Philadelphia Athletics.
- June 11 – Fred Raymer, 81, middle infielder and third baseman who played with the Chicago Orphans in 1901 and for the Boston Beaneaters from 1904 to 1905.
- June 15 – Rip Wade, 59, fourth outfielder for the 1923 Washington Senators.
- June 18 – Milo Allison, 66, backup outfielder who played for the Chicago Cubs and Cleveland Indians in a span of four seasons from 1913 to 1917.
- June 20 – Cy Warmoth, 64, pitcher who played with the St. Louis Cardinals in 1916 and for the Washington Senators from 1922 to 1923.
- June 24 – Jack Burns, 77, second baseman who played for the Detroit Tigers in 1903 and 1904.
- June 26 – Tom Whelan, 63, first baseman for the 1920 Boston Braves.
- June 28 – Johnny Ray, 45, outfielder for four Negro American League clubs (principally Cincinnati and Jacksonville) between 1937 and 1945.
- June 29 – Deacon Van Buren, 86, left fielder who played for the Brooklyn Superbas and Philadelphia Phillies during the 1904 season.

=== July ===
- July 3 – Dolf Luque, 66, Cuban pitcher whose Major League Baseball career included stints for the Boston Braves, Cincinnati Reds, Brooklyn Robins and New York Giants over twenty seasons from 1914 through 1935; posted a 194–179 record and 3.24 ERA in 550 pitching appearances, and led the National League with 27 wins in 1923 and twice in ERA in 1923 (1.93) and 1925 (2.63); won World Series rings with the Reds in 1919 and the Giants in 1933, and later became a successful manager in the Cuban Winter League, where he won eight pennant titles, and a coach for the New York Giants.
- July 11 – Red Bradley, 48, pitcher for the 1927 Baltimore Black Sox of the Eastern Colored League.
- July 12 – Farmer Brady, 67, southpaw who hurled for the Cleveland Tate Stars (1920), a barnstorming team, and the 1924 Cleveland Browns of the Negro National League.
- July 15 – Rip Wade, backup outfielder for the 1923 Washington Senators.
- July 16 – L. D. Livingston, 52, outfielder for the 1928–1930 Kansas City Monarchs of the Negro National League.
- July 25 – Frank Welch, 59, outfielder who played from 1919 through 1927 for the Philadelphia Athletics and Boston Red Sox.
- July 29 – Tommy Thevenow, 53, an elite defensive shortstop who played for five teams in 15 seasons from 1924 to 1938, compiling a solid .952 fielding average while hitting a subpar .247 average with just two inside-the-park home runs in 4,164 at-bats; most remembered as an unsung hero for hitting .417 (10-for-24) for the St. Louis Cardinals in the 1926 World Series, including an inside-the-park homer in Game 2 and the two winning RBI in the decisive Game 7 against the New York Yankees.

=== August ===
- August 14 – Tim Hendryx, 66, outfielder who played for the Cleveland Naps, New York Yankees, St. Louis Browns and Boston Red Sox over eight seasons spanning 1911–1921, whose most productive season came with the Red Sox in 1920 as a replacement for departed Babe Ruth at right field, when he posted a .328/.400/.413 batting line with 54 runs scored, 119 hits and 73 RBI, all career-highs, while appearing in 99 games.
- August 15 – Ed Baecht, 50, pitcher for the Philadelphia Phillies, Chicago Cubs and St. Louis Browns over all or parts of six seasons from 1926 to 1937.
- August 21 – Harry Damrau, 66, third baseman for the 1915 Philadelphia Athletics.
- August 25 – Ivy Griffin, 60, first baseman who played from 1919 through 1921 for the Philadelphia Athletics.

=== September ===
- September 2 – Don Hanski, 41, first baseman and left-handed pitcher who played for the Chicago White Sox from 1943 to 1944.
- September 9
  - Ed Karger, 74, pitcher for the Pittsburgh Pirates, St. Louis Cardinals, Cincinnati Reds and Boston Red Sox over six seasons spanning 1906–1911, who was given credit for a seven inning perfect game against the Boston Doves while pitching for St. Louis in 1907.
  - Bill Miller, 78, German outfielder who played for the Pittsburgh Pirates in its 1902 season.
- September 12 – Homer Thompson, 66, backup catcher for the 1912 New York Highlanders.
- September 15 – Max Butcher, 46, pitcher who played from 1936 through 1945 for the Brooklyn Dodgers, Philadelphia Phillies and Pittsburgh Pirates.
- September 25 – Marty Becker, 63, center fielder for the 1915 New York Giants.

=== October ===
- October 2 – Andy Harris, 61, infielder for the 1926 Newark Stars and 1927 New York Lincoln Giants of the Eastern Colored League; served as player-manager for Newark in 1926.
- October 6
  - Billy Campbell, 83, pitcher for the St. Louis Cardinals and Cincinnati Reds over parts of four seasons spanning 1905–1909.
  - Phil Cooney, 75, third baseman who made one game appearance for the 1905 New York Highlanders.
- October 8 – Paul Russell, 86, utility man who played with the St. Louis Browns in its 1894 season.
- October 9 – Butch Henline, 62, catcher and umpire; appeared in 740 games and batted .291 lifetime for the New York Giants, Philadelphia Phillies, Brooklyn Robins and Chicago White Sox from 1921 to 1931; began his umpiring career in the Southeastern League in 1939 and moved to the International League from 1940 to 1944; promoted to National League arbiter crew in 1945, where he worked in 606 league games and the 1947 All-Star Game through 1948.
- October 15 – Neal Ball, 76, shortstop for the New York Highlanders, Cleveland Naps and Boston Red Sox from 1907 through 1912, who was a member of the 1912 World Series Red Sox champion team and was the first player to turn an unassisted triple play in Major League Baseball history on July 19, 1909.
- October 22 – Larry Pezold, 64, third baseman for the 1914 Cleveland Naps.
- October 26 – Erwin Renfer, 65, pitcher who made a one-game appearance for the 1913 Detroit Tigers.
- October 30 – Fred Beebe, 77, pitcher whose career included stints for the Chicago Cubs, St. Louis Cardinals, Cincinnati Reds, Philadelphia Phillies and Cleveland Indians over seven seasons between 1906 and 1916, who as a rookie in 1906, posted 15 wins with a 2.93 ERA and led the National League with 171 strikeouts.

=== November ===
- November 1 – Charlie Caldwell, 56, pitcher for the 1925 New York Yankees, who later coached three sports at Williams College between 1925 and 1946, receiving AFCA Coach of the Year Award honors in 1950 and an induction to the College Football Hall of Fame in 1961.
- November 5 – Deke White, 85, 19th century pitcher who played for the Philadelphia Phillies in its 1895 season.
- November 8
  - Fred Anderson, 71, pitcher for the Boston Red Sox, Buffalo Blues and New York Giants over seven seasons spanning 1909–1918, posting a 53–57 record and 2.86 earned run average in 178 games, while leading the National League with a 1.44 ERA in 1917.
  - Joe Connor, 82, backup catcher for the St. Louis Browns, Boston Beaneaters, Milwaukee Brewers, Cleveland Blues and New York Highlanders in parts of four seasons between 1895 and 1905.
- November 19 – Frank Foreman, 94, well-traveled pitcher who was one of 19 men who played in four Major Leagues – the original Union Association, the American Association, the National League, and the American League in its inaugural season, pitching for 11 different clubs over eleven seasons from 1884 to 1902 while posting a 96–93 record and 3.97 ERA in 229 games, and whose Minor League career took him through seven leagues, primarily in the Northeast and Midwest circuits.
- November 21 – Bugs Bennett, 65, pitcher who played for the St. Louis Browns and Chicago White Sox during three seasons between 1918 and 1921.
- November 27 – Chuck Wolfe, 60, pitcher for the 1923 Philadelphia Athletics.
- November 28 – Ed Donnelly, 78, pitcher who played from 1911 to 1912 for the Boston Rustlers and Braves teams.

=== December ===
- December 3 – Jack Ness, 72, first baseman who had short stints with the Detroit Tigers in 1911 and the Chicago White Sox in 1916, whose career highlight came as a member of the Triple-A Oakland Oaks in 1915, while establishing a new standard for Organized Baseball when he hit safely in 49 consecutive Pacific Coast League games.
- December 4 – Jimmy Jordan, 49, middle infielder who played for the Brooklyn Dodgers over four seasons from 1933 to 1936.
- December 5 – Alex Ferson, 91, 19th century pitcher who played for the Washington Nationals, Buffalo Bisons and Baltimore Orioles in parts of three seasons spanning 1889–1892.
- December 10 – Hal Kleine, 34, pitcher who played from 1944 to 1945 for the Cleveland Indians.
- December 12 – George Daly, 70, pitcher who played for the New York Giants in its 1909 season.
- December 17 – Fritz Ostermueller, 50, pitcher whose 14-season career included stints with the Boston Red Sox, St. Louis Browns, Brooklyn Dodgers and Pittsburgh Pirates from 1934 to 1948, being portrayed in the 2013 film 42 as a pitcher who feared Jackie Robinson at the plate.
- December 21 – Marty Berghammer, 69, shortstop who played with the Chicago White Sox, Cincinnati Reds and Pittsburgh Rebels in a span of four seasons from 1911 to 1915.
- December 24 – Hal Reilly, 63, left fielder for the 1919 Chicago Cubs.
- December 26 – Tom Fleming, 84, center fielder who played for the New York Giants and Philadelphia Phillies in three seasons between 1899 and 1904.
