= 1982 Kansas City Royals season =

1982 Kansas City Royals
- League: American League
- Division: West
- Ballpark: Royals Stadium
- City: Kansas City, Missouri
- Record: 90–72 (.556)
- Divisional place: 2nd
- Owners: Ewing Kauffman
- General managers: John Schuerholz
- Managers: Dick Howser
- Television: WDAF-TV (Al Wisk, Denny Trease)
- Radio: WIBW (AM) (Denny Matthews, Fred White)

The 1982 Kansas City Royals season was their 14th in Major League Baseball. The Royals finished second in the American League West at 90–72, three games behind the California Angels in the first full season as manager for Dick Howser. Hal McRae led the team with 27 home runs and led the American League in runs batted in (133, a single-season franchise record) and doubles (46). Dan Quisenberry's 35 saves was also tops in the American League.

== Offseason ==
- October 23, 1981: Manny Castillo was traded by the Royals to the Seattle Mariners for a player to be named later. The Mariners completed the deal by sending Bud Black to the Royals on March 2, 1982.
- December 11, 1981: Clint Hurdle was traded by the Royals to the Cincinnati Reds for Scott Brown.
- December 11, 1981: Jerry Martin was traded by the San Francisco Giants to the Kansas City Royals for Rich Gale and Bill Laskey.
- January 14, 1982: Ken Phelps was traded by the Royals to the Montreal Expos for Grant Jackson.
- February 18, 1982: Dennis Littlejohn was traded by the San Francisco Giants to the Kansas City Royals for Jeff Cornell.
- March 23, 1982: Rance Mulliniks was traded by the Royals to the Toronto Blue Jays for Phil Huffman.
- March 30, 1982: Renie Martin, Craig Chamberlain, Atlee Hammaker, and Brad Wellman were traded by the Royals to the San Francisco Giants for Vida Blue and Bob Tufts.

== Regular season ==
=== Season standings ===
AL West
Team	W	L	Pct.	GB	Home	Road
California Angels	93	69	.574	—	52‍–‍29	41‍–‍40
Kansas City Royals	90	72	.556	3	56‍–‍25	34‍–‍47
Chicago White Sox	87	75	.537	6	49‍–‍31	38‍–‍44
Seattle Mariners	76	86	.469	17	42‍–‍39	34‍–‍47
Oakland Athletics	68	94	.420	25	36‍–‍45	32‍–‍49
Texas Rangers	64	98	.395	29	38‍–‍43	26‍–‍55
Minnesota Twins	60	102	.370	33	37‍–‍44	23‍–‍58

=== Record vs. opponents ===
1982 American League record Sources:
Team	BAL	BOS	CAL	CWS	CLE	DET	KC	MIL	MIN	NYY	OAK	SEA	TEX	TOR
Baltimore	—	4–9	7–5	5–7	6–7	7–6	4–8	9–4–1	8–4	11–2	7–5	7–5	9–3	10–3
Boston	9–4	—	7–5	4–8	6–7	8–5	6–6	4–9	6–6	7–6	8–4	7–5	10–2	7–6
California	5–7	5–7	—	8–5	8–4	5–7	7–6	6–6	7–6	7–5	9–4	10–3	8–5	8–4
Chicago	7–5	8–4	5–8	—	6–6	9–3	3–10	3–9	7–6	8–4	9–4	6–7	8–5	8–4
Cleveland	7–6	7–6	4–8	6–6	—	6–7	2–10	7–6	8–4	4–9	4–8	9–3	7–5	7–6
Detroit	6–7	5–8	7–5	3–9	7–6	—	6–6	3–10	9–3	8–5	9–3	6–6	8–4	6–7
Kansas City	8–4	6–6	6–7	10–3	10–2	6–6	—	7–5	7–6	5–7	7–6	7–6	7–6	4–8
Milwaukee	4–9–1	9–4	6–6	9–3	6–7	10–3	5–7	—	7–5	8–5	7–5	8–4	7–5	9–4
Minnesota	4–8	6–6	6–7	6–7	4–8	3–9	6–7	5–7	—	2–10	3–10	5–8	5–8	5–7
New York	2–11	6–7	5–7	4–8	9–4	5–8	7–5	5–8	10–2	—	7–5	6–6	7–5	6–7
Oakland	5–7	4–8	4–9	4–9	8–4	3–9	6–7	5–7	10–3	5–7	—	6–7	5–8	3–9
Seattle	5–7	5–7	3–10	7–6	3–9	6–6	6–7	4–8	8–5	6–6	7–6	—	9–4	7–5
Texas	3–9	2–10	5–8	5–8	5–7	4–8	6–7	5–7	8–5	5–7	8–5	4–9	—	4–8
Toronto	3–10	6–7	4–8	4–8	6–7	7–6	8–4	4–9	7–5	7–6	9–3	5–7	8–4	—

=== Notable transactions ===
==== Draft picks ====
- June 7, 1982: 1982 Major League Baseball draft
  - Will Clark was drafted by the Royals in the 4th round, but did not sign.
  - Bret Saberhagen was drafted by the Royals in the 19th round. Player signed July 26, 1982.
  - Andy Stankiewicz was drafted by the Royals in the 26th round, but did not sign.
  - Cecil Fielder was drafted by the Royals in the 4th round of the Secondary Phase. Player signed June 15, 1982.

=== Roster ===
1982 Kansas City Royals roster
Roster
Pitchers: 31 Mike Armstrong; 40 Bud Black; 33 Vida Blue; 37 Derek Botelho; 39 Bill Castro; 21 Keith Creel; 28 Dave Frost; 32 Larry Gura; 48 Don Hood; 36 Grant Jackson; 22 Dennis Leonard; 29 Dan Quisenberry; 34 Paul Splittorff; 27,36 Bob Tufts; 35 Jim Wright	Catchers: 9 Jamie Quirk; 7 Don Slaught; 12 John Wathan; Infielders: 24 Willie Aikens; 1 Buddy Biancalana; 5 George Brett; 2 Onix Concepción; 45 Kelly Heath; 17 Tim Ireland; 35 Ron Johnson; 14 Lee May; 4 Greg Pryor; 18 Rance Mulliniks; 30 U L Washington; 16 Dennis Werth; 20 Frank White	Outfielders: 23 César Gerónimo; 27 Steve Hammond; 25 Jerry Martin; 26 Amos Otis; 3 Tom Poquette; 38 Bombo Rivera; 57 Mark Ryal; 6 Willie Wilson; Other batters: 11 Hal McRae	Manager: 10 Dick Howser; Coaches: 43 Cloyd Boyer; 40 Rocky Colavito; 42 José Martínez; 41 Joe Nossek; 44 Jimmie Schaffer

== Player stats ==
= Indicates team leader

= Indicates league leader

=== Batting ===
==== Starters by position ====
Note: Pos = Position; G = Games played; AB = At bats; H = Hits; Avg. = Batting average; HR = Home runs; RBI = Runs batted in

Pos	Player	G	AB	H	Avg.	HR	RBI
C	John Wathan	121	448	121	.270	3	51
1B	Willie Aikens	134	466	131	.281	17	74
2B	Frank White	145	524	156	.298	11	56
SS	U L Washington	119	437	125	.286	10	60
3B	George Brett	144	552	166	.301	21	82
LF	Willie Wilson	136	585	194	.332	3	46
CF	Amos Otis	125	475	136	.286	11	88
RF	Jerry Martin	147	519	138	.266	15	65
DH	Hal McRae	159	613	189	.308	27	133

==== Other batters ====
Note: G = Games played; AB = At bats; H = Hits; Avg. = Batting average; HR = Home runs; RBI = Runs batted in

Player	G	AB	H	Avg.	HR	RBI
Onix Concepción	74	205	48	.234	0	15
Greg Pryor	73	152	41	.270	2	12
Steve Hammond	46	126	29	.230	1	11
César Gerónimo	53	119	32	.269	4	23
Don Slaught	43	115	32	.278	3	8
Lee May	42	91	28	.308	3	12
Jamie Quirk	36	78	18	.231	1	5
Tom Poquette	24	62	9	.145	0	3
Dennis Werth	41	15	2	.133	0	2
Ron Johnson	8	14	4	.286	0	0
Mark Ryal	6	13	1	.077	0	0
Bombo Rivera	5	10	1	.100	0	0
Tim Ireland	7	7	1	.143	0	0
Buddy Biancalana	3	2	1	.500	0	0
Kelly Heath	1	1	0	.000	0	0

=== Pitching ===
==== Starting pitchers ====
Note: G = Games pitched; IP = Innings pitched; W = Wins; L = Losses; ERA = Earned run average; SO = Strikeouts

Player	G	IP	W	L	ERA	SO
Larry Gura	37	248.0	18	12	4.03	98
Vida Blue	31	181.0	13	12	3.78	103
Paul Splittorff	29	162.0	10	10	4.28	74
Dennis Leonard	21	130.2	10	6	5.10	58

==== Other pitchers ====
Note: G = Games pitched; IP = Innings pitched; W = Wins; L = Losses; ERA = Earned run average; SO = Strikeouts

Player	G	IP	W	L	ERA	SO
Bud Black	22	88.1	4	6	4.58	40
Dave Frost	21	81.2	6	6	5.51	26
Bill Castro	21	75.2	3	2	3.45	37
Keith Creel	9	41.2	1	4	5.40	13
Derek Botelho	8	24.0	2	1	4.13	12

==== Relief pitchers ====
Note: G = Games pitched; W = Wins; L = Losses; SV = Saves; ERA = Earned run average; SO = Strikeouts

Player	G	W	L	SV	ERA	SO
Dan Quisenberry	72	9	7	35	2.57	46
Mike Armstrong	52	5	5	6	3.20	75
Don Hood	30	4	0	1	3.51	31
Grant Jackson	20	3	1	0	5.17	15
Bob Tufts	10	2	0	2	4.50	13
Jim Wright	7	0	0	0	5.32	9

== Farm system ==
Level	Team	League	Manager
AAA	Omaha Royals	American Association	Joe Sparks
AA	Jacksonville Suns	Southern League	Gene Lamont
A	Fort Myers Royals	Florida State League	Rick Mathews
A	Charleston Royals	South Atlantic League	Roy Tanner
Rookie	GCL Royals	Gulf Coast League	Joe Jones
Rookie	Butte Copper Kings	Pioneer League	Tommy Jones
