= Dennis Werth =

American baseball player (born 1952)

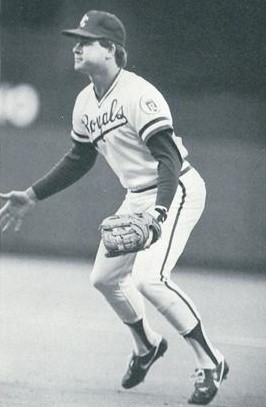
- First baseman
- Born: December 29, 1952 (age 73); Lincoln, Illinois, U.S.
- Batted: Right Threw: Right

MLB debut
- September 17, 1979, for the New York Yankees

Last MLB appearance
- September 27, 1982, for the Kansas City Royals

MLB statistics
- Batting average: .209
- Home runs: 3
- Runs batted in: 15
- Stats at Baseball Reference

Teams
- New York Yankees (1979–1981); Kansas City Royals (1982)

Dennis Dean Werth (born December 29, 1952) is an American former Major League Baseball catcher, first baseman, and outfielder.

== Career ==
Werth is an alumnus of Southern Illinois University Edwardsville and Lincoln College. Drafted by the New York Yankees in the 19th round of the 1974 Major League Baseball draft, Werth made his Major League debut with the New York Yankees on September 17, 1979, and appeared in his final game on September 27, 1982. During the baseball strike in 1981, Werth played for the Columbus Clippers. He was signed by Yankees scout Lou Maguolo. He was traded from the Yankees to the Royals for minor-league right-handed pitcher Scot Beahan during spring training on March 24, 1982.

== Personal ==
Werth is the stepfather of former Washington Nationals outfielder Jayson Werth, and the husband of former U.S. Olympic athlete Kim Schofield Werth.
