= Jim Wright (1980s pitcher) =

American baseball player and coach (born 1955)

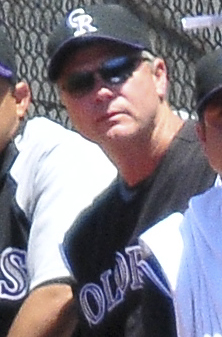
- Wright with the Colorado Rockies in 2009
- Pitcher/Bullpen coach
- Born: March 3, 1955 (age 71); St. Joseph, Missouri, U.S.
- Batted: Right Threw: Right

MLB debut
- April 22, 1981, for the Kansas City Royals

Last MLB appearance
- May 15, 1982, for the Kansas City Royals

MLB statistics
- Win–loss record: 2–3
- Earned run average: 4.04
- Strikeouts: 36
- Stats at Baseball Reference

Teams
- Kansas City Royals (1981–1982); As coach: Colorado Rockies (2002, 2009–2014)

James Leon Wright (born March 3, 1955) is an American former professional baseball pitcher. He played parts of two seasons in the major leagues for the Kansas City Royals, appearing in 17 games during the 1981 season and seven games during the 1982 season.

Wright transitioned to coaching after his playing days, and was employed as a minor league coach in the farm systems of both the Chicago Cubs and Philadelphia Phillies. He was with the Peoria Chiefs in 1985-1986, moved up to the (AA) Pittsfield Cubs in 1987, and in 1988-1989 served as pitching coach for the (AAA) Iowa Cubs. From 1990 through 1996, Wright was a pitching coach in the Phillies organization. In 1996, he spent part of the year on the Phillies big league coaching staff, filling in for ailing pitching coach Johnny Podres. On the major league level, Wright was the Colorado Rockies' pitching coach in 2002, and served as their bullpen coach from 2009 to 2012.
