= Dee Fondy =

American baseball player (1924–1999)

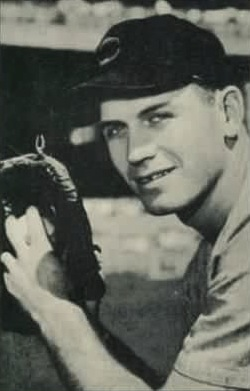
- Fondy in 1953.
- First baseman
- Born: October 31, 1924; Slaton, Texas, U.S.
- Died: August 19, 1999 (aged 74); Redlands, California, U.S.
- Batted: Left Threw: Left

MLB debut
- April 17, 1951, for the Chicago Cubs

Last MLB appearance
- September 21, 1958, for the Cincinnati Reds

MLB statistics
- Batting average: .286
- Home runs: 69
- Runs batted in: 373
- Stats at Baseball Reference

Teams
- Chicago Cubs (1951–1957); Pittsburgh Pirates (1957); Cincinnati Reds (1958)

Dee Virgil Fondy (October 31, 1924 – August 19, 1999) was an American professional baseball player who played first base in the Major Leagues from 1951 to 1958. He played for the Pittsburgh Pirates, Cincinnati Reds, and Chicago Cubs.

Fondy was 6 ft 3 in (1.91 m) and weighed 195 pounds. He spent a portion of his youth in San Bernardino, California.

Fondy was the last player to bat at Ebbets Field. The Pirates lost to the Dodgers 2–0 on September 24, 1957. He grounded out to shortstop Don Zimmer who threw to first baseman Jim Gentile for the final out of the game. He batted above .300 three times, twice for the Cubs and the Pirates during the 1950s.

== Soldier; minor league baseball ==
Fondy served in World War II in the U.S. Army and was among the forces which landed on Utah Beach, in Normandy, in 1944. This was three months after D-Day.

In the spring of 1949, Fondy played for the Fort Worth Cats in the Texas League. He homered off Mort Cooper in an exhibition game against the Chicago Cubs in Fort Worth. After hitting .328 for the Cats in 1948, he was promoted to the Montreal Royals of the International League, in April 1949. He played a total of 16 games with Montreal, 6 with Fort Worth, and 128 with the Mobile Bears of the Southern Association, in 1949. He hit .294 with Mobile. In 1950 Fondy hit .297 in 141 games with Fort Worth. He led the Texas League in stolen bases with 38 and played in the league's all-star game.

== Dodgers' prospect ==
Fondy came to the majors in the Brooklyn Dodgers organization as a huge slugging first baseman from Fort Worth. A 1949 New York Times article remarked on his speed for a big man. In spring training he scored from second on a fly ball to right fielder, Carl Furillo, who possessed a rifle arm. Unfortunately for him his path with the Dodgers was blocked by Gil Hodges, who was a mainstay at first base.

== Chicago Cubs (1951–1957) ==
On opening day in 1951, Fondy hit a bases-loaded triple in his first major league at bat to assist the Cubs to an 8–3 victory against the Cincinnati Reds at Wrigley Field. Fondy also had two singles and drove in four runs. He was sent down to the Los Angeles Angels of the Pacific Coast League in July, when Chuck Connors was recalled by the Cubs. At the time Fondy was hitting .293 with 3 home runs and 20 RBIs. In one memorable game with the Angels, Fondy came to the plate 6 times. He hit three singles and three home runs -- one to right, one to left, one to center.

Fondy hit his first homer of the 1953 season to score Eddie Miksis and beat the Dodgers, 6–4. The baseball landed in the left center field bleachers on the first day of a Cubs' home stand. He clouted his 5th and 6th home runs at Philadelphia, Pennsylvania against the Philadelphia Phillies on June 9. His 5 RBIs were wasted as the Cubs committed 5 errors and lost 10–9. He collected 4 hits against Pittsburgh at Forbes Field on July 25. The last one broke a 4–4 tie and gave the Cubs a 5–4 win. It was his 13th 1953 homer. In September Fondy's 9th inning steal of home won the opener of a doubleheader against Cincinnati. He had a solo home run as one of 6 hit by the Cubs in the game.

Fondy jammed his left hand against Cincinnati in July 1954 and missed several games. X-rays proved negative. During spring training in 1955 Fondy went on a tear of 13 hits in 16 times at bat. He knocked in 7 runs with a couple of home runs versus the San Antonio Missions on April 2. He hit his 5th home run of 1956 in the 10th inning of a July 19 game with Philadelphia. It earned Chicago a 4–3 victory.

== Pittsburgh Pirates, Cincinnati Reds (1957–1958) ==
In January 1957 Fondy was reported to be part of a 9 player trade which would have sent him along with second baseman Gene Baker to the Phillies, in return for center fielder Richie Ashburn. Instead Fondy and Baker were traded to Pittsburgh for first baseman Dale Long and outfielder Lee Walls. There was no cash involved. On May 12 Fondy batted two singles and a home run to help defeat Robin Roberts and the Phillies, 6–1. He took the lead in the National League batting race with three singles in five at-bats against the St. Louis Cardinals on June 4. The last hit gave the Pirates the win and boosted Fondy's batting average to .375.

Fondy was traded to the Cincinnati Reds for Ted Kluszewski in December 1957. It was an even deal of first baseman. Fondy averaged .313 in 106 games in 1957 despite being injured after being hit with a thrown ball in pre-game practice. Fondy had difficulty making the starting lineup for the Reds in 1958. He was moved to the outfield after George Crowe became the regular first baseman. Fondy smashed a 3-run homer against the Milwaukee Braves to send Lew Burdette to an early exit on May 18. On September 29 Cincinnati released Fondy to the Seattle Rainiers of the Pacific Coast League in exchange for pitcher Claude Osteen.

== Scout & baseball executive ==
Following his playing career he worked as a scout and front office official for the New York Mets and the Milwaukee Brewers. With the Brewers he signed Paul Molitor, who amassed more than 3,000 hits in his career in the majors. Fondy retired from baseball in 1995 after working as a special assistant to the Milwaukee general manager. He was promoted from director of scouting to special assistant to general manager, Harry Dalton, on December 5, 1977.

== Death ==
Fondy died at the Plymouth Village retirement center, age 74, in 1999. He was buried at Montecito Memorial Park, in Colton, California.
