= Steve Hammond =

American baseball player

- Outfielder
- Born: May 9, 1957 (age 68); Atlanta, Georgia, U.S.
- Batted: Left Threw: Right

MLB debut
- June 28, 1982, for the Kansas City Royals

Last MLB appearance
- October 3, 1982, for the Kansas City Royals

MLB statistics
- Batting average: .230
- Home runs: 1
- Runs batted in: 11

NPB statistics
- Batting average: .274
- Home runs: 9
- Runs batted in: 29
- Stats at Baseball Reference

Teams
- Kansas City Royals (1982); Nankai Hawks (1987)

Steven Benjamin Hammond (born May 9, 1957) is an American former Major League Baseball outfielder who played for one season. He played in 46 games for the Kansas City Royals during the 1982 Kansas City Royals season. He went on to a productive career with the Nankai Hawks, where he batted .274 with 9 home runs in 1987 season.
