= Zearlee Maxwell =

American baseball player (1902–1957)

- Third baseman
- Born: August 16, 1902; Cleburne, Texas, U.S.
- Died: April 18, 1957 (aged 54); Cleburne, Texas, U.S.
- Batted: Right Threw: Right

Negro league baseball debut
- 1937, for the Memphis Red Sox

Last appearance
- 1938, for the Memphis Red Sox

Teams
- Memphis Red Sox (1937–1938)

Zearlee Maxwell (August 16, 1902 – April 18, 1957), nicknamed "Jiggs", was an American Negro league third baseman in the 1930s.

A native of Cleburne, Texas, Maxwell made his Negro leagues debut in 1937 with the Memphis Red Sox, and played with Memphis again the following season. He died in his hometown of Cleburne in 1957 at age 54.
