= Lee Walls =

American baseball player (1933–1993)

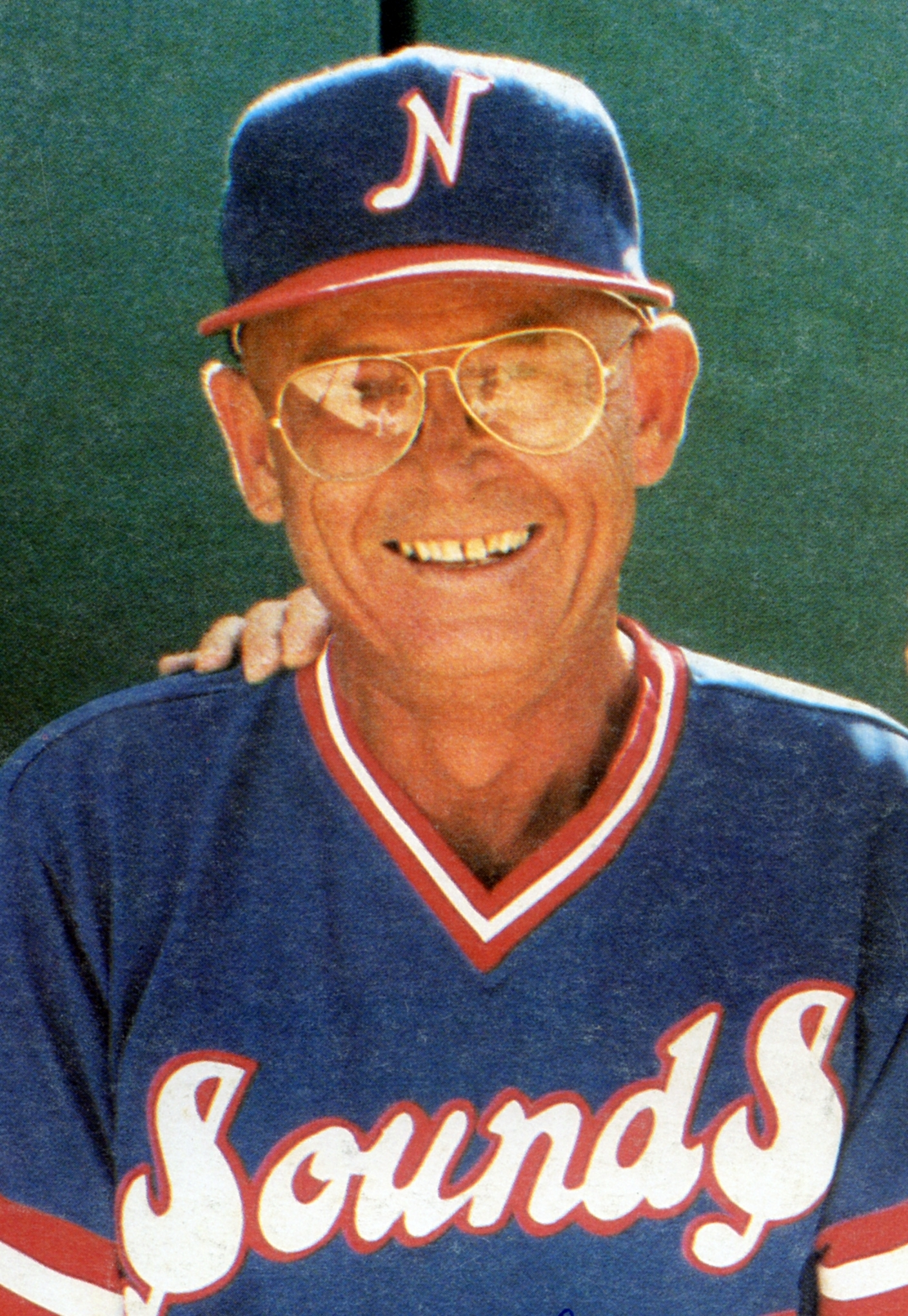
- Walls with the Nashville Sounds in 1985
- Outfielder
- Born: January 6, 1933; San Diego, California, U.S.
- Died: October 11, 1993 (aged 60); Los Angeles, California, U.S.
- Batted: Right Threw: Right

MLB debut
- April 21, 1952, for the Pittsburgh Pirates

Last MLB appearance
- October 4, 1964, for the Los Angeles Dodgers

MLB statistics
- Batting average: .262
- Home runs: 66
- Runs batted in: 284
- Stats at Baseball Reference

Teams
- As player: Pittsburgh Pirates (1952, 1956–1957); Chicago Cubs (1957–1959); Cincinnati Reds (1960); Philadelphia Phillies (1960–1961); Los Angeles Dodgers (1962–1964); Hankyu Braves (1965); As coach: Oakland Athletics (1979–1981); New York Yankees (1983)

Career highlights and awards
- All-Star (1958); World Series champion (1963)

Raymond Lee Walls Jr. (January 6, 1933 – October 11, 1993) was an American professional baseball player who was an outfielder in Major League Baseball (MLB) between 1952 and 1964 as a member of the Pittsburgh Pirates, Chicago Cubs, Cincinnati Reds, Philadelphia Phillies and Los Angeles Dodgers. He also played the 1965 season in Japan, for the Hankyu Braves. The native of San Diego threw and batted right-handed, stood 6 feet 3 inches (1.91 m) tall, and weighed 205 pounds (93 kg). Walls wore eyeglasses on the field during his active career — a rarity for players of his era — and was nicknamed "Captain Midnight" because of his eyewear.

== Early life ==
Walls was born on January 6, 1933, in San Diego, California. Walls graduated from Pasadena High School, where he starred on the baseball team. He attended Pasadena City College, where he was known as a great all-around athlete in basketball (as a leading scorer on the school's team), baseball and football. He played third base on the school's baseball team. He made the All-Southern California team two consecutive years. He also pitched in American Legion Baseball while in high school.

== Playing career ==
=== Pittsburgh Pirates ===
In February 1951, Pittsburgh Pirates scout Howie Haak signed Walls to play for the Pirates. Walls played in the Pirates' minor league farm system from 1951 to 1955, principally playing in the outfield or at third base. In a full season with the Class C Modesto Reds in 1951, he had a .342 batting average, with 14 home runs, 109 runs batted in (RBI), 100 runs scored and a .923 OPS (on-base plus slugging). He was second in the California League in batting average, and in the top ten in RBIs, runs and OPS. He was the California League's Rookie of the Year.

In 1952, he split the season between the Class B Waco Pirates and the MLB Pittsburgh Pirates. He began and finished the season with the Pittsburgh Pirates. He played 30 MLB games that year, batting only .188 in 80 at bats. He was sent down to Waco, where he played in 80 games between May 11 and August 9, with 10 home runs, 59 RBIs and 46 runs. He either had a .308 or .306 batting average in Waco. It was reported at the time in August 1952 that when Walls was called up to the Pittsburgh Pirates, he was hitting .306 for the Waco Pirates; while a modern source reports the numbers yield a .308 average.

Walls returned to the minor leagues for another three years before playing MLB baseball again. From 1953 to 1955, Walls played with the Hollywood Stars of the Pacific Coast League, batting .268, .290 and .283, respectively. In 1955, he had 24 home runs, 99 RBIs, 81 runs and an .801 OPS.

In 1956, his first full MLB season, Walls batted .274 with 11 triples (third in the National League), 11 home runs and 54 RBIs. He played the majority of his games in left field and right field, with an overall .967 fielding percentage in the outfield. He began the 1957 season with the Pirates, but on May 1, he was traded with Dale Long to the Chicago Cubs for Dee Fondy and Gene Baker.

=== Chicago Cubs ===
In 1957, he played in 117 games for the Cubs, starting 59 games in left field and 28 in center field. He batted .240, with six home runs, 33 RBIs and 42 runs scored. On July 2, 1957, Walls hit for the cycle in an 8–6 loss to the Cincinnati Reds at Wrigley Field. Overall on the season, he hit .237.

The next season,1958, proved to be Walls' best year. Playing as the Cubs' regular right fielder, Walls reached career highs in hits (156), home runs (24), RBIs (72), runs (80) and batting average (.304) in 136 games played. He was tied for ninth in home runs and had the 10th highest batting average and WAR (wins above replacement) in the National League. On April 24, against the newly relocated Dodgers at the Los Angeles Memorial Coliseum, minutes down the freeway from his hometown of Pasadena, Walls hit three home runs and had eight RBIs in a 15–2 Chicago rout. Selected to the National League All-Star team as a reserve, he pinch hit for the Pirates' Bob Skinner in the seventh inning and grounded out against Billy O'Dell. Walls stayed in the game to play left field, but that was his only plate appearance as the American League won, 4–3, at Baltimore's Memorial Stadium.

Walls' production declined in 1959. He appeared in 16 fewer games, with nearly 175 less plate appearances from a year earlier; and his OPS declined from .863 to .734 compared to 1958. His batting average fell to .257, and he had only eight home runs.

=== Cincinnati Reds and Philadelphia Phillies ===
In December 1959, the Cubs traded Walls, Lou Jackson and Bill Henry to Cincinnati Reds for Frank Thomas. After the 1959 season, Walls never played in over 100 games, or had 300 at bats, in a season. In 1960, he had started 23 of the 29 games in which he appeared for the Reds, almost all in the outfield, when he was traded to the Philadelphia Phillies along with Tony Gonzalez for Wally Post, Harry Anderson and Fred Hopke, on June 15. He was hitting .274 with one home run and seven RBIs at the time. He appeared in 65 games for the Phillies, and hit only .199. He started 29 games at third base, 11 in the outfield and two at third base for the Phillies in 1960.

In 1961, he started 24 games at third base, 24 games at first base and 15 games in the outfield for the Phillies. He hit .280 in 261 at bats, with eight home runs, 30 RBIs and 32 runs, along with a .754 OPS. He was left unprotected in the October 1961 expansion draft, and was the New York Mets' seventh overall selection in that draft's premium phase. In December 1961, the Mets traded Walls and $100,000 to the Los Angeles Dodgers for Charlie Neal and a player to be named later (Willard Hunter).

=== Los Angeles Dodgers and Hankyu Braves ===
Walls last three years (1962–64) in MLB were all with the Dodgers. He was used chiefly as a utility player, playing at third base, first base, left field, right field, catcher and pinch hitting. He started only 31 games over that three-year span. Walls was the Dodgers' player representative and a member of the player-owner executive council. In December 1963, he and teammate Don Drysdale spoke up against "the first year player rule", as taking jobs from veteran players in favor of unprepared younger players; and undermining the quality of Major League Baseball. He was also Drysdale's roommate with the Dodgers.

Walls was particularly effective in 1962, going 13-for-27 (.482) as a pinch hitter for the Dodgers. This is the second highest batting average ever for a pinch hitter in a single season (with at least 30 plate appearances). In 1962, the Dodgers ended the 162-game season in a tie with the San Francisco Giants, necessitating a best-of-three playoff round. Walls played all three games of the 1962 National League tie-breaker series, including a Game 1 start at first base, which the Dodgers lost. In Game 2, he contributed a pinch hit double (coincidentally, off Billy O'Dell), driving home three runs to spark a crucial, seven-run Los Angeles rally in the bottom of the sixth inning. Walls also scored a run in the sixth inning when Giants' catcher Tom Haller dropped the ball at home plate after a sliding Walls spiked Haller (also putting Haller out of action for five days).

Game 2 went four hours and 18 minutes, the longest nine-inning game in MLB history at that time. By winning, 8–7, the Dodgers staved off elimination and extended the series to a decisive third contest. The next day, however, the Dodgers fell to the Giants in the ninth and final inning, the Giants scoring four runs in the top of the ninth to win the game 6–4. Walls, pinch hitting for Larry Burright, made the final out of the game, lining to center fielder Willie Mays.

The following year, Walls was a member of the world champion Dodgers, hitting .233, with three home runs in 86 at bats. Walls did not appear in his club's four-game sweep of the New York Yankees in the 1963 World Series. In his final season with the Dodgers (1964), he appeared in only 37 games, with a .179 batting average in 28 at bats. The Dodgers released him in mid-October 1964. In 1965, he played in the Japan Pacific League for the Hankyu Braves, batting .302 with 14 home runs. Walls retired as an active player after that season.

In 902 total games played over ten National League seasons, Walls collected 670 hits, with 88 doubles, 31 triples and 66 home runs. Walls delivered 45 hits in 176 at bats (.256) during his career as a pinch hitter.

== Coaching and managing career ==
In February 1979, the Oakland Athletics hired Walls as their first base coach, under manager Jim Marshall. Marshall was replaced by Billy Martin in 1980, and Martin retained Walls through the 1982 season. Walls and Martin also had been teammates during Walls brief time with the 1960 Reds. In Oakland, he helped implement the "Billy-ball" style of play. The A's fired Martin after the 1982 season, and he was hired by the New York Yankees to manage the team in 1983. Martin brought Walls with him to the Yankees to serve as a special instructor. Martin was fired after the 1983 season, ending Walls' tenure with the Yankees as well.

In January 1985, the Detroit Tigers hired Walls to manage their Triple-A affiliate, the Nashville Sounds of the American Association. He was selected from among 150 applicants. Less than one month into the season, the 52-year old Walls underwent major surgery to address internal bleeding in his stomach, and was replaced by Gordy McKenzie.

== Personal life and death ==
After finishing his career as a player, Walls moved to Southern California and became an agent for professional athletes. Drysdale became one of his clients.

Walls had a liver transplant in 1993. He died on October 11, 1993, at the UCLA Medical Center in Los Angeles from complications after the surgery. He had been living in Palm Springs, California and Scottsdale, Arizona. He was survived by his wife Joanna Walls and three children.

== See also ==
- List of Major League Baseball players to hit for the cycle

Achievements
Preceded by Don Mueller	Hitting for the cycle July 2, 1957	Succeeded by Mickey Mantle
