= Kelly Heath =

American baseball player (born 1957)

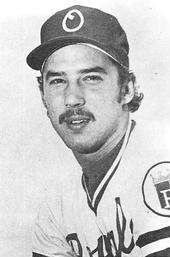
- Heath in 1980
- Second baseman
- Born: September 4, 1957 (age 68); Plattsburgh, New York, U.S.
- Batted: Right Threw: Right

MLB debut
- April 20, 1982, for the Kansas City Royals

Last MLB appearance
- April 20, 1982, for the Kansas City Royals

MLB statistics
- Batting average: .000
- At-bats: 1
- Stats at Baseball Reference

Teams
- Kansas City Royals (1982)

Kelly Mark Heath (born September 4, 1957) is an American professional baseball player and scout. A second baseman, Heath played in Major League Baseball for the Kansas City Royals in 1982, and played in minor league baseball for fourteen years. He currently scouts for the Royals, and previously scouted for the Oakland Athletics and Cincinnati Reds.

== Career ==
Born in Plattsburgh, New York, Heath attended Louisburg College, a junior college (JUCO) where he played college baseball. In 1977, he was named to the JUCO All-Tournament Team. The Kansas City Royals drafted Heath in the seventh round, with the 177th overall selection, of the 1977 Major League Baseball draft.

Heath spent 24 days with the Kansas City Royals in the major leagues in 1982, and appeared in one game. On April 20, Heath served as a defensive replacement for Frank White. White opted to leave the game due to a case of hemorrhoids. Heath lined out in his only at-bat.

After the 1983 season, in which he led the Omaha Royals, Kansas City's Class AAA minor league affiliate, in home runs (13) and runs batted in (65), Heath signed as a free agent with the New York Yankees organization. He played for the Atlanta Braves organization in 1986 and 1987, the Toronto Blue Jays organization in 1988 and 1989, and the Philadelphia Phillies organization in 1990.

Heath played for Milano in the Italian Baseball League.

After retiring as a player, Heath was a coach for the Reading Phillies of the Class AA Eastern League in 1992. He then coached for the Martinsville Phillies of the Rookie-level Appalachian League. He managed for Martinsville in the 1997 season.

Heath has been a scout for the Oakland Athletics. He joined the Cincinnati Reds as a scout in 2004 and joined the Royals in 2007.
